= The Walking Dead season 8 =

Television season

The Walking Dead
- Season 8
- Promotional poster art
- Showrunner: Scott M. Gimple
- Starring: Andrew Lincoln; Norman Reedus; Lauren Cohan; Chandler Riggs; Danai Gurira; Melissa McBride; Lennie James; Alanna Masterson; Josh McDermitt; Christian Serratos; Seth Gilliam; Ross Marquand; Jeffrey Dean Morgan; Austin Amelio; Tom Payne; Xander Berkeley; Khary Payton; Steven Ogg; Katelyn Nacon; Pollyanna McIntosh
- No. of episodes: 16

Release
- Original network: AMC
- Original release: October 22, 2017 – April 15, 2018

Season chronology
- ← Previous; Season 7 Next → Season 9

The eighth season of The Walking Dead, an American post-apocalyptic horror television series on AMC, premiered on October 22, 2017, and concluded on April 15, 2018, consisting of 16 episodes. Developed for television by Frank Darabont, the series is based on the eponymous series of comic books by Robert Kirkman, Tony Moore, and Charlie Adlard. The executive producers are Kirkman, David Alpert, Scott M. Gimple, Greg Nicotero, Tom Luse, and Gale Anne Hurd, with Gimple as showrunner for his fifth and final season. The eighth season received mixed reviews from critics. It was nominated for multiple awards and won two, including Best Horror Television Series for the third consecutive year, at the 44th Saturn Awards.

This season adapts material from issues #115–126 of the comic book series "All Out War Part I & II" and introduces notable comic book character Siddiq (Avi Nash). The season continues the story of Rick Grimes (Andrew Lincoln) and his group of survivors in their fight against Negan (Jeffrey Dean Morgan) and the Saviors. Rick, along with Maggie (Lauren Cohan), leading The Hilltop, and King Ezekiel (Khary Payton), leader of The Kingdom, unite forces to start a rebellion against the tyrant leader of the Saviors, initiating a war for the freedom of the communities.

== Cast ==
=== Main cast ===
The primary characters of the eighth season include (from left to right): Rick, Carol, Morgan, Daryl, Carl, Enid, Rosita, Tara, Michonne, Gabriel, Aaron, Maggie, Jesus, Gregory, Shiva, Ezekiel, Jadis, Eugene, Simon, Dwight, and Negan

The eighth season features twenty series regulars overall. For this season, Katelyn Nacon, Khary Payton, Steven Ogg, and Pollyanna McIntosh were promoted to series regular status, after previously having recurring roles, while Seth Gilliam and Ross Marquand were added to the opening credits.

==== Starring ====
- Andrew Lincoln as Rick Grimes, the series' protagonist, a former sheriff's deputy and the leader of Alexandria, who is leading a new alliance to fight Negan and the Saviors.
- Norman Reedus as Daryl Dixon, Rick's right-hand man, the group's primary hunter and a recruiter for Alexandria.
- Lauren Cohan as Maggie Greene, the pregnant widow of Glenn and a leading figure of the Hilltop.
- Chandler Riggs as Carl Grimes, Rick's bold and courageous teenage son.
- Danai Gurira as Michonne, Rick's katana-wielding girlfriend, who acts as a mother figure to Carl and Judith.
- Melissa McBride as Carol Peletier, a fierce survivor who is spurred into fighting the Saviors as revenge for the deaths of her friends.
- Lennie James as Morgan Jones, the first survivor Rick had ever encountered, who now resides in the Kingdom and fights for his sanity.
- Alanna Masterson as Tara Chambler, a caring, witty member of the group and supply runner for Alexandria who serves as a liaison with Oceanside.
- Josh McDermitt as Eugene Porter, a timorous former member of the group whose resourcefulness leads Negan to take him under his wing.
- Christian Serratos as Rosita Espinosa, an impulsive member of the group, who is motivated to avenge her ex-boyfriend Spencer and Abraham's death.
- Seth Gilliam as Gabriel Stokes, a priest who has become hardened from his experiences with Rick's group.
- Ross Marquand as Aaron, an Alexandrian recruiter who brought Rick's group to Alexandria and is currently in the fight against the Saviors.
- Jeffrey Dean Morgan as Negan, the leader of the Saviors who serves as the season's primary antagonist.

==== Also starring ====
- Austin Amelio as Dwight, a former subordinate of Negan who now works for Rick as a double agent against the Saviors.
- Tom Payne as Paul "Jesus" Rovia, a scout for the Hilltop, that fights for the moral balance of the group.
- Xander Berkeley as Gregory, the selfish and hypocritical leader of the Hilltop whose influence diminished with Maggie's prominence.
- Khary Payton as Ezekiel, the charismatic leader of the Kingdom who allies with Rick against the Saviors.
- Steven Ogg as Simon, a former mortgage broker and Negan's second-in-command, he does not hide his intentions to overthrow Negan.
- Katelyn Nacon as Enid, a former member of Alexandria who moved to Hilltop to be with Maggie, and has formed a relationship with Carl.
- Pollyanna McIntosh as Jadis / Anne, the deceptive leader of the Scavengers who betrayed Rick's group, and maintains a neutral stance in the war.

=== Supporting cast ===
==== Alexandria Safe-Zone ====
- Jason Douglas as Tobin, the foreman of Alexandria's construction crew and member of Rick's militia.
- Jordan Woods-Robinson as Eric Raleigh, Aaron's boyfriend and his former recruiting partner, who is now a member of Rick's militia.
- Kenric Green as Scott, a supply runner in Alexandria and member of Rick's militia.
- Dahlia Legault as Francine, a member of Alexandria's construction crew and member of Rick's militia.
- Mandi Christine Kerr as Barbara, resident of Alexandria.
- Ted Huckabee as Bruce, resident and member of Alexandria's construction and member of Rick's militia.

==== The Hilltop ====
- James Chen as Kal, a guard of the Hilltop and soldier of the Hilltop's militia.
- Peter Zimmerman as Eduardo, a guard of the Hilltop and soldier of the Hilltop's militia.
- Karen Ceesay as Bertie, a resident of the Hilltop and soldier of the Hilltop's militia.
- Jeremy Palko as Andy, a resident of the Hilltop and soldier of the Hilltop's militia.
- Brett Gentile as Freddie, a resident of the Hilltop and soldier of the Hilltop's militia.
- R. Keith Harris as Dr. Harlan Carson, the doctor at the Hilltop, who was captured by Simon in the previous season.
- Ilan Srulovicz as Wesley, a resident of the Hilltop and soldier of the Hilltop's militia.
- Anthony Lopez as Oscar, a resident of the Hilltop and a soldier of Hilltop's militia.

==== The Saviors ====
- Jayson Warner Smith as Gavin, one of Negan's top lieutenants, who leads the weapons base.
- Traci Dinwiddie as Regina, one of Negan's top lieutenants.
- Elizabeth Ludlow as Arat, one of Negan's top enforcers.
- Mike Seal as Gary, one of Negan's top lieutenants and accomplice of Simon in his plans to overthrow Negan.
- Lindsley Register as Laura, one of Negan's top lieutenants.
- Juan Pareja as Morales, a survivor from Rick's original Atlanta camp who joined the Saviors.
- Joshua Mikel as Jared, Benjamin's killer, and a hostile Savior in Gavin's crew who antagonizes Morgan.
- Callan McAuliffe as Alden, a member of the Saviors who willingly surrenders to Jesus at the satellite station outpost.
- Lindsey Garrett as Mara, a Savior who guards one of many outposts.
- Lee Norris as Todd, a timid member of the Saviors who works at the same outpost as Mara.
- Katy O'Brian as Katy, a member of the Saviors.
- Whitmer Thomas as Gunther, a member of the Saviors who tortures Ezekiel.
- Charles Halford as Yago, a Savior who manages Gavin's weapons base.
- Ciera L. Payton as Zia, a Savior whom Rosita and Michonne encounter at a supply warehouse.
- Adam Cronan as Leo, a Savior whom Rosita and Michonne encounter at a supply warehouse.
- Chloe Aktas as Tanya, one of Negan's wives.
- Elyse Dufour as Frankie, one of Negan's wives.
- Jon Eyez as Potter, a worker for the Saviors.
- Adam Fristoe as Dean, a Savior who tried to kill Jesus.
- Matt Mangum as D.J., one of Negan's top lieutenants and guardian of the Sanctuary.
- Aaron Farb as Norris, a member of the Saviors.
- Lane Miller as Reilly, a good-hearted member of the Saviors who begins to question his side in the war.

==== The Kingdom ====
- Cooper Andrews as Jerry, Ezekiel's loyal and good-natured bodyguard.
- Kerry Cahill as Dianne, one of Ezekiel's top soldiers and a skilled archer.
- Daniel Newman as Daniel, one of Ezekiel's top soldiers.
- Carlos Navarro as Alvaro, one of Ezekiel's top soldiers.
- Macsen Lintz as Henry, a resident of the Kingdom and younger brother of the deceased Benjamin, who wants revenge on the Saviors for the death of his brother.
- Jason Burkey as Kevin, a resident of the Kingdom.
- Nadine Marissa as Nabila, a resident and gardener of the Kingdom.
- Peggy Sheffield as Dana, a doctor for the Kingdom.

==== Oceanside ====
- Deborah May as Natania, the vigilant leader of Oceanside.
- Sydney Park as Cyndie, Natania's granddaughter.
- Briana Venskus as Beatrice, one of Oceanside's top soldiers.
- Nicole Barré as Kathy, one of Oceanside's top soldiers.
- Mimi Kirkland as Rachel, an aggressive young member of Oceanside.

==== The Scavengers ====
- Sabrina Gennarino as Tamiel, a leading member of the Scavengers.
- Thomas Francis Murphy as Brion, a leading member of the Scavengers.

==== Miscellaneous ====
- Avi Nash as Siddiq, a mysterious vagabond survivor who befriends Carl.
- Jayne Atkinson as Georgie, the leader of a mysterious humanitarian group.

== Production ==
The Walking Dead was renewed by AMC for a 16-episode eighth season on October 16, 2016. Production began on April 25, 2017, in Atlanta, Georgia. On July 12, 2017, production was shut down after stuntman John Bernecker was killed, after falling more than 20 feet onto a concrete floor. Production resumed on July 17. The season premiere, which also serves as the series' milestone 100th episode, was directed by executive producer Greg Nicotero.

In November 2017, it was announced that Lennie James who portrays Morgan Jones, would be leaving The Walking Dead after the conclusion of this season, and would join the cast of the spin-off series Fear the Walking Dead for its fourth season. The eighth season also features the departures of series regulars Chandler Riggs (Carl Grimes), Steven Ogg (Simon), and Austin Amelio (Dwight). Riggs' final episode is the mid-season premiere where his character is killed off, which is a deviation from the comic book, where his character is still alive. His death received negative reactions from critics and fans. Ogg's final episode is the penultimate episode of the season, where his character is killed by Negan. Amelio departed the series after the season finale, and in January 2019, it was confirmed he would join the cast of Fear the Walking Dead.

== Episodes ==
No. overall	No. in season	Title	Directed by	Written by	Original release date	U.S. viewers (millions)
100	1	"Mercy"	Greg Nicotero	Scott M. Gimple	October 22, 2017	11.44
Rick, Maggie, and Ezekiel rally their communities together to take down Negan. Gregory attempts to have the Hilltop residents side with Negan, but they all firmly stand behind Maggie. The group attacks the Sanctuary, taking down its fences and flooding the compound with walkers. With the Sanctuary overrun, everyone leaves except Gabriel, who reluctantly stays to save Gregory, but is left behind when Gregory abandons him. Surrounded by walkers, Gabriel hides in a trailer, where he is trapped inside with Negan.
101	2	"The Damned"	Rosemary Rodriguez	Matthew Negrete & Channing Powell	October 29, 2017	8.92
Rick's forces split into separate parties to attack several of the Saviors' outposts, during which many members of the group are killed; Eric is critically injured and rushed away by Aaron. Jesus stops Tara and Morgan from executing a group of surrendered Saviors. While clearing an outpost with Daryl, Rick is confronted and held at gunpoint by Morales, a survivor he met in the initial Atlanta camp, who is now with the Saviors.
102	3	"Monsters"	Greg Nicotero	Matthew Negrete & Channing Powell	November 5, 2017	8.52
Daryl finds Morales threatening Rick and kills him; the duo then pursue a group of Saviors who are transporting weapons to another outpost. Gregory returns to Hilltop, and after a heated argument, Maggie ultimately allows him back in the community. Eric dies from his injuries, leaving Aaron distraught. Despite Tara and Morgan's objections, Jesus leads the group of surrendered Saviors to Hilltop. Ezekiel's group attacks another Savior compound, during which Kingdom fighters are annihilated while protecting Ezekiel.
103	4	"Some Guy"	Dan Liu	David Leslie Johnson	November 12, 2017	8.69
Ezekiel's group is overwhelmed by the Saviors, who kill all of them except for Ezekiel himself and Jerry. Carol clears the inside of the compound, killing all but two Saviors, who almost escape but are eventually caught by Rick and Daryl. En route to the Kingdom, Ezekiel, Jerry, and Carol are surrounded by walkers, but Shiva sacrifices herself to save them. The trio returns to the Kingdom, where Ezekiel's confidence in himself as a leader has diminished.
104	5	"The Big Scary U"	Michael E. Satrazemis	Story by : Scott M. Gimple & David Leslie Johnson & Angela Kang; Teleplay by : David Leslie Johnson & Angela Kang	November 19, 2017	7.85
After confessing their sins to each other, Gabriel and Negan manage to escape from the trailer. Simon and the other lieutenants grow suspicious of each other, knowing that Rick’s forces must have inside information. The workers in the Sanctuary become increasingly frustrated with their living conditions, and a riot nearly ensues, until Negan returns and restores order. Gabriel is locked in a cell, where Eugene discovers him sick and suffering. Meanwhile, Rick and Daryl argue over how to take out the Saviors.
105	6	"The King, the Widow, and Rick"	John Polson	Angela Kang & Corey Reed	November 26, 2017	8.28
Rick visits Jadis in hopes of convincing her to turn against Negan; Jadis refuses, and locks Rick in a shipping container. Carl encounters Siddiq in the woods and recruits him to Alexandria. Daryl and Tara plot to deviate from Rick’s plans by destroying the Sanctuary. Ezekiel isolates himself at the Kingdom, where Carol tries to encourage him to be the leader his people need. Maggie has the group of captured Saviors placed in a holding area and forces Gregory to join them as punishment for betraying Hilltop.
106	7	"Time for After"	Larry Teng	Matthew Negrete & Corey Reed	December 3, 2017	7.47
After learning of Dwight's association with Rick's group, Eugene affirms his loyalty to Negan and outlines a plan to get rid of the walkers surrounding the Sanctuary. With help from Morgan and Tara, Daryl drives a truck through the Sanctuary’s walls, flooding its interior with walkers, killing many Saviors. Rick finally convinces Jadis and the Scavengers to align with him, and they plan to force the Saviors to surrender. However, when they arrive at the Sanctuary, Rick is horrified to see the breached walls and no sign of the walker herd.
107	8	"How It's Gotta Be"	Michael E. Satrazemis	David Leslie Johnson & Angela Kang	December 10, 2017	7.89
Eugene's plan allows the Saviors to escape the Sanctuary, and separately, the Saviors waylay the Alexandria, Hilltop, and Kingdom forces. The Scavengers abandon Rick, after which he returns to Alexandria. Aaron and Enid are ambushed by Oceanside soldiers, and Enid inadvertently kills Natania. Ezekiel ensures that the Kingdom residents are able to escape before locking himself in the community with the Saviors. Eugene aids Gabriel and Doctor Carson in escaping the Sanctuary in order to ease his conscience. Negan attacks Alexandria, but Carl devises a plan to allow the Alexandria residents to escape into the sewers. Carl reveals he was bitten by a walker while escorting Siddiq to Alexandria.
108	9	"Honor"	Greg Nicotero	Matthew Negrete & Channing Powell	February 25, 2018	8.28
Realizing his time alive is limited, Carl writes several letters to his loved ones. After the Saviors leave Alexandria, the survivors make for the Hilltop while Rick and Michonne stay behind to say their final goodbyes to a dying Carl, who pleads with Rick to build a better future alongside the Saviors. Morgan and Carol launch a rescue mission for Ezekiel and successfully retake the Kingdom from the invading Saviors; their lieutenant, Gavin, is killed by Benjamin's vengeful younger brother, Henry.
109	10	"The Lost and the Plunderers"	David Boyd	Angela Kang & Channing Powell & Corey Reed	March 4, 2018	6.82
Aaron and Enid try to convince Oceanside to join the fight against the Saviors, but they refuse; Enid returns to Hilltop while Aaron opts to stay at Oceanside until he can convince them to join. Upon learning of the Scavenger’s siding with Rick, Negan orders Simon to kill only one of Jadis’ people. Rick and Michonne travel to the junkyard to try to regain help from the Scavengers, but they are too late; Simon had ordered the Saviors to slaughter the entire group; Jadis, who managed to escape lures her reanimated comrades into a waste shredder to protect herself.
110	11	"Dead or Alive Or"	Michael E. Satrazemis	Eddie Guzelian	March 11, 2018	6.60
The Saviors hunt the surviving Alexandrians as they make their way to the Hilltop; Dwight affirms his loyalty to Rick's group as he distracts the Saviors and helps lead the group to safety. Eugene leads a crew of Saviors in crafting bullets at a new outpost while Negan plans to taint the Saviors' weapons with walker blood, in order to make the others "turn" instead of killing them. Doctor Carson tries to help a feverish and nearly blind Gabriel to safety, but the Saviors eventually catch up, killing Carson and recapturing Gabriel.
111	12	"The Key"	Greg Nicotero	Corey Reed & Channing Powell	March 18, 2018	6.66
Maggie, Enid, Michonne and Rosita encounter a seemingly benevolent woman named Georgie, who gives them food and documents in exchange for phonograph records; Georgie claims the documents to be "a key to the future". Negan leads the Saviors towards the Hilltop to send a warning via their newly tainted weapons; Rick pursues the Saviors and chases Negan into a building. Negan eventually escapes, only to be captured at gunpoint by Jadis. Unable to find Negan, Simon instructs the Saviors to attack the Hilltop and "expunge" the community for good.
112	13	"Do Not Send Us Astray"	Jeffrey F. January	Angela Kang & Matthew Negrete	March 25, 2018	6.77
The Saviors attack the Hilltop with their tainted weapons, leading to a battle in which both sides suffer heavy casualties. Tara is injured by Dwight in an effort to prevent Simon from killing her. Overnight, the injured die from their tainted wounds and attack the sleeping survivors after reanimating. Henry tries to take revenge for the murder of his brother, leading to the breakout of Jared and other Savior prisoners and the disappearance of Henry. Having seen the Saviors' callous attitude for themselves, Alden and several other Saviors choose to remain at the Hilltop rather than return to the Saviors.
113	14	"Still Gotta Mean Something"	Michael E. Satrazemis	Eddie Guzelian	April 1, 2018	6.30
Carol and Morgan search for Henry while Rick hunts the escaped Savior prisoners; Morgan abandons Carol and joins Rick. The prisoners help them fight off an attacking horde of walkers, but Rick and Morgan massacre them anyway. Jadis tortures Negan until he informs her that he had nothing to do with Simon massacring her people; a helicopter flies nearby, but Jadis fails to catch its attention. Daryl and Rosita plot to stop Eugene from crafting ammunition for the Saviors. Carol finds Henry alive in the woods and they return to Hilltop. Upon Rick and Morgan's return, Michonne encourages Rick to read Carl's letter to him.
114	15	"Worth"	Michael Slovis	David Leslie Johnson-McGoldrick & Corey Reed	April 8, 2018	6.67
Negan returns to the Sanctuary and regains control of the Saviors. Dwight secretly prepares notes to Rick about Negan's plans, and later sends Gregory to deliver the notes. Daryl and Rosita capture Eugene from his outpost, but he manages to escape and continues pushing his workers to craft bullets. Dwight lures Simon into a meeting where Negan accosts him for going against his orders with the Scavengers, and kills him in a fist fight. Negan then reveals that Laura informed him of Dwight's siding with Rick, and that his planning was a ruse upon knowing of Dwight's disloyalty. Negan is contacted by Michonne - who reads Carl's letter to him at the request of making peace; Negan remains intent on killing Rick and his allies once and for all.
115	16	"Wrath"	Greg Nicotero	Scott M. Gimple & Angela Kang & Matthew Negrete	April 15, 2018	7.92
Rick's group follows the false plans given to them by Gregory, leading them into a trap. As the Saviors fire, their weapons backfire due to their ammo being sabotaged by Eugene. The surviving Saviors surrender, while Rick chases down Negan; the two brawl and Rick manages to slice Negan's neck, but immediately has Siddiq tend to the wound, knowing that Carl wanted Negan to survive. Meanwhile, an attack at the Hilltop is stopped with help from Aaron and the Oceanside soldiers. The survivors regroup and rebuild their communities, but Rick's decision to spare Negan angers Maggie and she vows to take action against Rick in the future.

== Release ==
The first trailer for the season was released on July 21, 2017 at San Diego Comic-Con. The second trailer was released on February 1, 2018 for the second part of the season.

On March 15, 2018, it was announced that the season finale and the fourth season premiere of Fear the Walking Dead would be screened at AMC, Regal, and Cinemark theaters across the United States on April 15, the same day as the TV airing, for "Survival Sunday: The Walking Dead & Fear the Walking Dead". The episodes marked the first crossover between the two series. The cinema screening also included an extra half-hour of exclusive bonus content.

== Reception ==
=== Critical response ===
The eighth season of The Walking Dead received mixed reviews from critics. On Rotten Tomatoes, the season holds a score of 65% with an average rating of 6.65 out of 10 based on 447 reviews. The site's critical consensus reads: "The Walking Dead's eighth season energizes its characters with some much-needed angst and action, though it's still occasionally choppy and lacking forward-moving plot progression."

The Walking Dead season 8: Critical reception by episode
Season 8 (2017–18): Percentage of positive critics' reviews tracked by the website Rotten Tomatoes

=== Accolades ===
For the 44th Saturn Awards, the eighth season of The Walking Dead received seven nominations, winning two. It won Best Horror Television Series and Best Performance by a Younger Actor in a Television Series (Chandler Riggs). The nominations were for Best Actor on Television (Andrew Lincoln), Best Supporting Actor on Television (Khary Payton), Best Supporting Actress on Television (Danai Gurira and Melissa McBride), and Best Guest Starring Role on Television (Jeffrey Dean Morgan).

The first half of the season was nominated for Outstanding Performance by a Stunt Ensemble in a Television Series at the 24th Screen Actors Guild Awards.

=== Ratings ===
Viewership and ratings per episode of The Walking Dead season 8
No.	Title	Air date	Rating (18–49)	Viewers (millions)	DVR (18–49)	DVR viewers (millions)	Total (18–49)	Total viewers (millions)
1	"Mercy"	October 22, 2017	5.0	11.44	2.2	4.28	7.2	15.74
2	"The Damned"	October 29, 2017	4.0	8.92	2.0	4.16	6.0	13.10
3	"Monsters"	November 5, 2017	3.8	8.52	2.2	4.47	6.0	13.01
4	"Some Guy"	November 12, 2017	3.9	8.69	1.8	3.66	5.7	12.36^{1}
5	"The Big Scary U"	November 19, 2017	3.4	7.85	—N/a	—N/a	—N/a	—N/a
6	"The King, the Widow, and Rick"	November 26, 2017	3.6	8.28	2.1	4.44	5.7	12.73
7	"Time for After"	December 3, 2017	3.3	7.47	1.9	4.15	5.2	11.63
8	"How It's Gotta Be"	December 10, 2017	3.4	7.89	2.0	4.23	5.4	12.13
9	"Honor"	February 25, 2018	3.6	8.28	—N/a	—N/a	—N/a	—N/a
10	"The Lost and the Plunderers"	March 4, 2018	2.9	6.82	1.7	3.80	4.6	10.63
11	"Dead or Alive Or"	March 11, 2018	2.8	6.60	1.6	3.44	4.4	10.06
12	"The Key"	March 18, 2018	2.8	6.66	1.7	3.76	4.5	10.44
13	"Do Not Send Us Astray"	March 25, 2018	3.0	6.77	1.7	3.82	4.7	10.62
14	"Still Gotta Mean Something"	April 1, 2018	2.6	6.30	1.8	3.68	4.4	9.99
15	"Worth"	April 8, 2018	2.8	6.67	1.7	3.64	4.5	10.32
16	"Wrath"	April 15, 2018	3.4	7.92	1.6	3.30	5.0	11.24

^1 Live +7 ratings were not available, so Live +3 ratings have been used instead.

== Home media ==
The eighth season was released on Blu-ray and DVD on August 21, 2018. The set includes three audio commentaries and three featurettes.
