= Monsters (The Walking Dead) =

- The Walking Dead episode
- Morales holds Rick at gunpoint
- Episode no.: Season 8 Episode 3
- Directed by: Greg Nicotero
- Written by: Matthew Negrete; Channing Powell
- Cinematography by: Michael E. Satrazemis
- Editing by: Alan Cody
- Original air date: November 5, 2017
- Running time: 42 minutes

Guest appearances
- Juan Pareja as Morales; Jason Douglas as Tobin; Jordan Woods-Robinson as Eric Raleigh; Kenric Green as Scott; Peter Zimmerman as Eduardo; James Chen as Kal; Anthony Lopez as Oscar; Cooper Andrews as Jerry; Kerry Cahill as Dianne; Daniel Newman as Daniel; Carlos Navarro as Alvaro; Callan McAuliffe as Alden; Joshua Mikel as Jared; Adam Fristoe as Dean; Lee Norris as Todd

Episode chronology
← Previous "The Damned"	Next → "Some Guy"
- The Walking Dead season 8

"Monsters" is the third episode of the eighth season of the post-apocalyptic horror television series The Walking Dead, which aired on AMC on November 5, 2017. The episode was written by Matthew Negrete and Channing Powell, and directed by Greg Nicotero.

The episode continues to follow the different groups in their attack against several Savior outposts as well as the aftermath. It also features the final appearances of Morales (Juan Pareja) and Eric Raleigh (Jordan Woods-Robinson). Eric's death was partially adapted from Issue #118 of the comic book series.

== Plot ==
Inside the Savior office outpost, Morales, a former member of Rick's group, holds Rick at gunpoint after Daryl and Rick had been searching for a cache of heavy machine guns belonging to the Saviors. Rick and Morales discuss at length their tribulations since they parted; Morales lost his family while Rick admits he lost many. Morales swears his loyalty to Negan and insists that Rick is a "monster" for what he's done, but Rick tries to appeal to him. Suddenly, Daryl appears and kills Morales without any remorse despite having recognized him. Finding no guns elsewhere, the two take Gracie, the infant Rick found earlier, and leave to join with Aaron's forces.

Outside the stronghold, Aaron's forces have kept the Saviors confined, forcing them to deal with the reanimation of their dead colleagues rather than their attackers. Aaron drags his wounded partner Eric away from battle. Eric insists that Aaron leave him behind and gives him a final kiss before Aaron returns to the battle.

Meanwhile, Morgan, Jesus, and Tara lead a group of captive Saviors along a road. One Savior, Jared, who shot Morgan's protégé Benjamin, taunts Morgan, leading Morgan to turn his gun onto him. Just as Jesus tries to intervene a horde of walkers appears, allowing some of the Saviors (including Jared) to escape. Morgan attempts to give chase and fires on the escapees, killing one, before Jesus and Tara stop him. Morgan and Jesus fight about how to handle the remaining Saviors, before Tara breaks them up. Morgan walks away.

At the Hilltop, Gregory returns and begs to be let back in to Maggie, but she demands that he tells her what happened at the Sanctuary, seeing that he is driving the car assigned to Gabriel. Gregory falsely claims that he doesn't know who Gabriel is and says he was negotiating with Negan, trying to arrange for the best for the Hilltop. While Maggie is distrustful, she lets him in as she comments Gregory isn't worth killing. Jesus and Tara then arrive to deliver the remaining prisoners. Gregory attempts to discourage them from keeping the hostiles there. Maggie, though cautious of holding the prisoners, refuses to listen to Gregory.

Rick and Daryl arrive at the warehouse to help deal with the remaining Saviors. Outside, Aaron finds a re-animated Eric walking off into the woods. Aaron, in a state of shock, is pulled back in and volunteers to take Gracie back to the Hilltop. A lone Savior opens fire on Rick and Daryl from behind a tree. Rick gives his word that the man will live if he gives information. The man confesses that the guns have been transported to a new location. As soon as he says this, Daryl kills the man. Rick looks upset with Daryl’s actions, but says nothing. The two then set off to the location of the guns.

Elsewhere, Carol and King Ezekiel have led their army against a nearby Savior outpost. They are victorious with no apparent losses, but as they revel in their win, some hiding Saviors open fire on them with heavy machine guns, the same guns Rick had been looking for.

== Reception ==
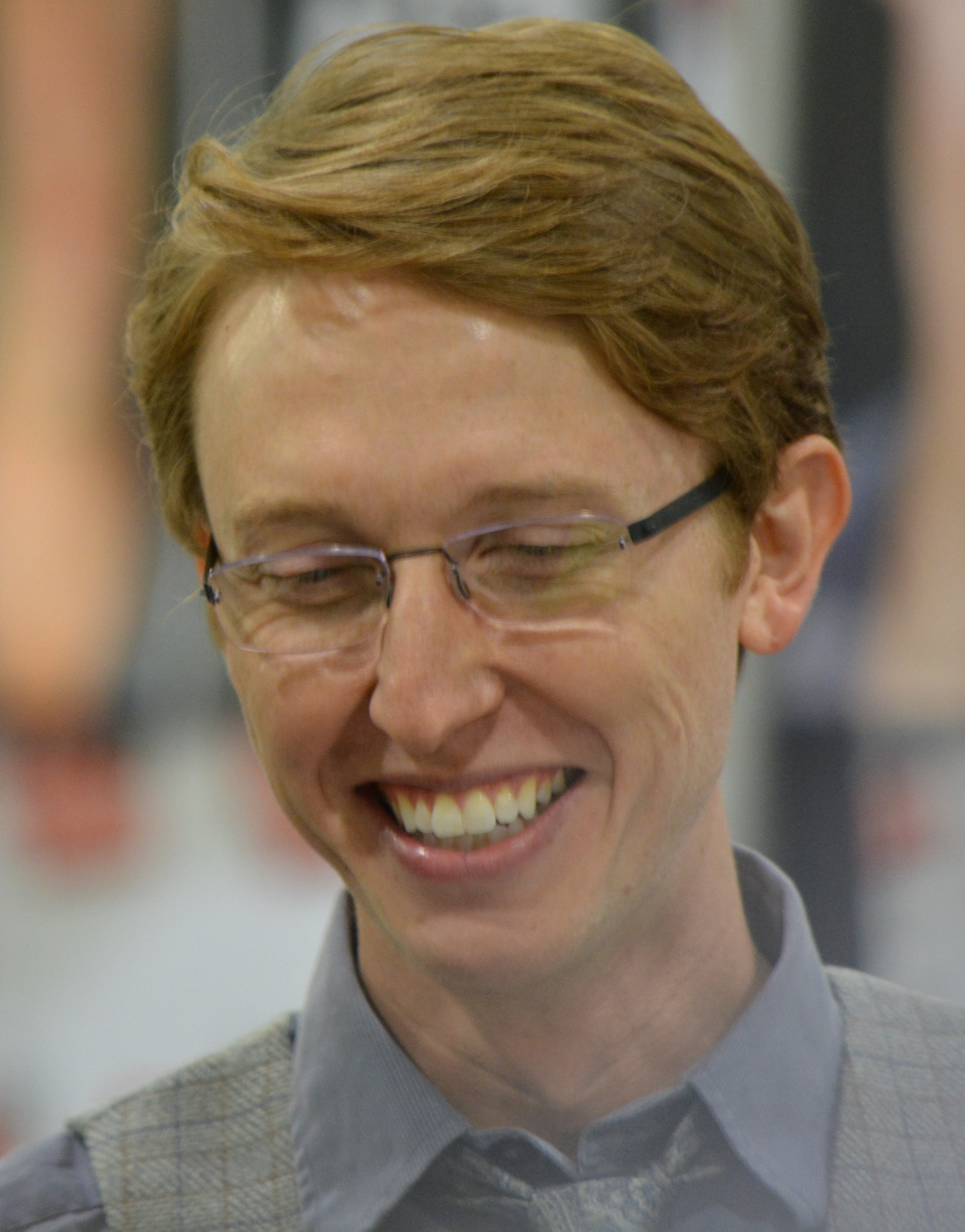
Jordan Woods-Robinson makes his final recurring appearance as Eric Raeligh in this episode

=== Critical reception ===
"Monsters" received mixed reviews from critics, with the action sequences and the deaths of Morales and Eric Raleigh being the subjects of praise, while it was criticized for its lack of impact on the season's overall story. On Rotten Tomatoes, it holds a 56% with an average rating of 6.23 out of 10, based on 25 reviews. The site's consensus reads: Despite featuring significant deaths and action sequences, "Monsters" struggles to make meaningful progress in the season's overall story.

Eric Kain of Forbes praised the episode, calling it the best of the season giving some “decent fight scenes and shoot-outs and raising the tension up a notch.”

Kelly Lawler of USA Today had a less favorable review of the episode, criticizing the rationality and reasoning with the characters and their actions, saying “Down to its on-the-nose title, this week's episode asks, "Who are the monsters now?" But The Walking Dead has asked that question many, many times, and with much better character work than the surface-level stuff done on Sunday.” She did, however, express hope in the cliffhanger, saying “Hopefully, the cliffhanger ending means next week's episode will move on because presenting the "all out war" from this perspective isn't working out too well so far.”

=== Ratings ===
The episode averaged a 3.8 rating among adults 18-49, and had a viewership of 8.52 million viewers, slightly down from the previous episode.
