= Some Guy =

- The Walking Dead episode
- Carol and King Ezekiel watch helplessly as Shiva is being devoured by walkers.
- Episode no.: Season 8 Episode 4
- Directed by: Dan Liu
- Written by: David Leslie Johnson
- Cinematography by: Michael E. Satrazemis
- Editing by: Sarah C. Reeves
- Original air date: November 12, 2017
- Running time: 42 minutes

Guest appearances
- Cooper Andrews as Jerry; Daniel Newman as Daniel; Carlos Navarro as Alvaro; Nadine Marissa as Nabila; Macsen Lintz as Henry; Jason Burkey as Kevin; Whitmer Thomas as Gunther; Charles Halford as Yago; Keith Hudson as Rudy

Episode chronology
← Previous "Monsters"	Next → "The Big Scary U"
- The Walking Dead season 8

"Some Guy" is the fourth episode of the eighth season of the post-apocalyptic horror television series The Walking Dead, which aired on AMC on November 12, 2017. The episode was written by David Leslie Johnson and directed by Dan Liu.

This episode is mainly centered on the character of King Ezekiel (Khary Payton). It also features the final appearances of Shiva (Ezekiel's pet Bengal tiger), Daniel (Daniel Newman) and Alvaro (Carlos Navarro). Shiva's death was adapted from Issue #118 of the comic book series.

== Plot ==
In a flashback, King Ezekiel prepares himself and his troops from the Kingdom to go to war alongside the Alexandria and Hilltop communities against the Saviors. He gives a rousing speech to boost morale before they depart.

In the present, Ezekiel crawls out from the pile of dead bodies of the Kingdom soldiers. His troops had sacrificed themselves to protect Ezekiel from a Savior assault; the enemy had used the machine guns Rick and Daryl had been searching for. With one leg wounded and the dead starting to re-animate, Ezekiel is rescued by a surviving Kingdom soldier, Alvaro. Ezekiel and Alvaro attempt to get to safety, but Alvaro is killed with a fatal gunshot through the chest by a Savior, Gunther (Whitmer Thomas). The Savior takes the King hostage and tells him that he plans to turn Ezekiel to Negan for a handsome reward. He forces Ezekiel forward at gunpoint, toward a fenced complex to escape the turned Kingdom walkers following them. Throughout, Gunther taunts Ezekiel, mocking that "even in death, [his men] still follow [him]". Reaching the complex's gate, they discover that it is locked. With Ezekiel unable to climb, Gunther prepares to decapitate him and carry the head. However, Jerry suddenly appears and uses his axe to bisect Gunther's body with one swing, killing him and saving his leader. Jerry then helps Ezekiel up, and the two defend themselves while trying to break the lock.

In the nearby outpost, Carol surprises the Saviors moving the machine guns, killing several. The remaining Saviors rush to transport the guns away by Humvee, resulting in a firefight outside the building, near where Ezekiel and Jerry are fighting. Carol is able to trick the Saviors into letting their guard down, killing all but two of them, but she then spots Ezekiel and Jerry close to being overrun by walkers. She goes to help them, allowing the Saviors to escape in the Humvee. Rescued, Ezekiel laments that Carol let the guns get away, but they then hear the roar of a nearby motorcycle. Outside the complex, Rick and Daryl show up, giving chase. The two force the Humvee off the road.

Back at the outpost, Carol and Jerry help escort Ezekiel through the growing walker horde with their ammo running low. They come to a shallow creek milling with walkers, which is difficult for Ezekiel to cross with his injury. Carol and Jerry insist Ezekiel continue walking, but decides he rather stay behind and sacrifice himself to fight off the walkers for them. He breaks down and says to Jerry that he is just "some guy" and not worthy of being a leader. Suddenly Shiva, Ezekiel's pet Bengal tiger, unexpectedly arrives and tears into the walkers. The tiger ultimately sacrifices herself in the process, much to Ezekiel's heartbreak and outrage. Carol and Jerry are then forced to take a tearful Ezekiel away. Eventually, the three make it back to the Kingdom gates. Families of the soldiers that Ezekiel spoke to at the start of the day rush in to hear the news. However, Ezekiel cannot bring himself to say anything and quietly walks away.

== Reception ==
=== Critical reception ===
"Some Guy" received positive reviews from critics, with many describing it as the best episode of the season. On Rotten Tomatoes, it holds an 89% with an average rating of 7.77 out of 10, based on 28 reviews. The site's consensus reads: By keeping its focus on a fan favorite, "Some Guy" delivers a compelling – though ultimately heartbreaking – episode.

Laura Bradley of Vanity Fair called it “the best episode this season has seen yet;” applauding the prosthetics and makeup saying “Nicotero’s best work to date;” and Khary Payton’s portrayal of Ezekiel’s breakdown. Noel Murray of Rolling Stone said that the episode “gets back to one of the series' core strengths: reducing a sprawling post-apocalyptic epic to a few pivotal moments in the lives of ordinary people.” Kelly Lawler of USA Today noted “Khary Payton does great work for the whole hour and is especially affecting at the moment Ezekiel has given up his Shakespearean dialect for slang out of pure terror and guilt.

=== Ratings ===
The episode averaged a 3.9 rating among adults 18-49, and had a viewership of 8.69 million viewers, which was an improvement from the previous week.
