= The Damned (The Walking Dead) =

- The Walking Dead episode
- King Ezekiel rallies his forces for battle.
- Episode no.: Season 8 Episode 2
- Directed by: Rosemary Rodriguez
- Written by: Matthew Negrete; Channing Powell
- Cinematography by: Michael E. Satrazemis
- Editing by: Evan Schrodek
- Original air date: October 29, 2017
- Running time: 42 minutes

Guest appearances
- Juan Pareja as Morales; Jason Douglas as Tobin; Jordan Woods-Robinson as Eric Raleigh; Kenric Green as Scott; Dahlia Legault as Francine; Peter Zimmerman as Eduardo; Jeremy Palko as Andy; Brett Gentile as Freddie; Anthony Lopez as Oscar; Cooper Andrews as Jerry; Kerry Cahill as Dianne; Daniel Newman as Daniel; Carlos Navarro as Alvaro; Lindsey Garrett as Mara; Callan McAuliffe as Alden; Joshua Mikel as Jared; Adam Fristoe as Dean; Lee Norris as Todd; Joshua Lamboy as Gracie's Father

Episode chronology
← Previous "Mercy"	Next → "Monsters"
- The Walking Dead season 8

"The Damned" is the second episode of the eighth season of the post-apocalyptic horror television series The Walking Dead, which aired on AMC on October 29, 2017. The episode was written by Matthew Negrete and Channing Powell, and directed by Rosemary Rodriguez.

The combined attack on Negan and the Saviors' compound has left the entire complex surrounded by a large horde of walkers, preventing the Saviors from leaving or entering the Sanctuary. The combined forces of Alexandria, the Hilltop and the Kingdom split up to deal with other Savior outposts, using information provided by Dwight.

This episode marks the return of Morales (Juan Pareja), who was last seen in the first season episode "Wildfire", and has the longest period of absence of any character on The Walking Dead; having been absent for six seasons and 95 episodes. The recurring characters Francine (Dahlia Legault), Andy (Jeremy Palko) and Freddie (Brett Gentile) make their final appearances after being killed by the Saviors.

== Plot ==
Morgan, Tara, and Jesus lead a silent coordinated surprise attack on the same radio telescope observatory they had previously cleared of Saviors; however, Morgan, along with Andy and Freddie, appear to be gunned down. Tara and Jesus find a man cowering in a closet claiming to be a worker from the Sanctuary, and while Tara is eager to kill him, Jesus insists they keep him alive. However, the man turns on them, threatening to shoot Jesus. Tara and Jesus overpower him and tie him up. They later find the remaining Saviors who voluntarily drop their guns. Morgan, who was only stunned unconscious in the attack, vengefully kills any remaining Saviors on his way out and is stopped by Jesus from killing the ones they have taken captive.

King Ezekiel and Carol command their forces to a Savior pharmacy lab. With only one Savior left, they try to shoot him but only wound him, giving the guard the chance to set off a smoke bomb and unleash walkers that had been trapped within the building. Ezekiel's group readily dispatches them, but the guard has escaped and they fear he might reach a nearby Savior stronghold to warn them. They find a trail of blood and surmise he is moving slowly; they also discover a walker with its skin ripped off and Ezekiel becomes curious as to its fate. They eventually catch up with the man and Shiva the tiger mauls him to death. Ezekiel enthusiastically rallies his troops to take the nearby Savior stronghold, despite the Saviors knowing they are coming.

Aaron and his boyfriend Eric lead the assault on a warehouse where many Saviors are holed up. Francine dies of a shot in the chest during the shooting. When some of the Saviors attempt to flank them, Eric takes a risky move to move around cover and stop them. The firefight is protracted and the Saviors realize too late that its goal was to wait out the deaths of the first victims to reanimate into walkers, as to attack the remaining Saviors within. As the fight dies down, Aaron finds Eric had been shot in the stomach and races him to safety.

Using Aaron's distraction, Rick and Daryl sneak into a town hall, where Dwight's info said that heavy machine guns are hidden; Rick desires to capture these to prevent the Saviors using them to clear the walker horde. Finding the place empty, the two split up. Rick encounters one man and gets into a fight, the man seemingly protecting a specific door. Rick impales him on a shelf bracket and then opens the door, only to find a sleeping infant, and Rick becomes devastated. He is distracted enough by his act that he is easily caught at gunpoint by Morales, one of the first survivors Rick met at Atlanta, and who is now loyal to the Saviors.

== Reception ==
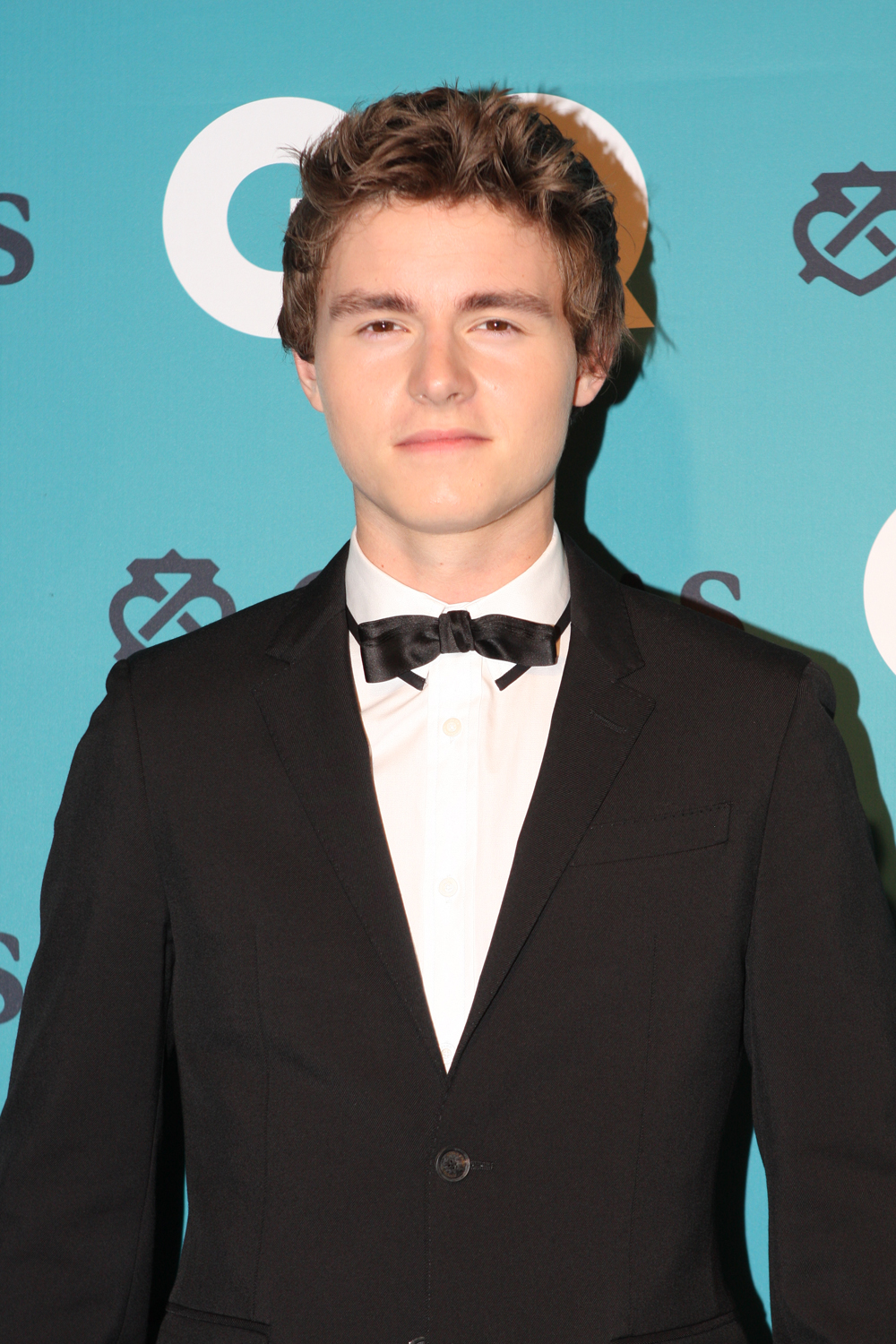
Callan McAuliffe makes his first appearance as Alden in this episode.

=== Critical reception ===
"The Damned" received mixed reviews, with many critics citing it as a step down from the season premiere. On Rotten Tomatoes, it holds a 50% with an average rating of 5.81 out of 10, based on 22 reviews. The site's consensus reads: "The Damned" stumbles after the season opener, with the unexpected return of a forgotten character, and a whole lot of action—but not a whole lot of thrills. Matt Fowler of IGN gave the episode a 7.6/10, pitting chaotic action, an interesting twist at the episode's end, and a refreshing soundtrack against questionable character choices, a confusing timeline, and a stale storyline. Forbes's Eric Kain gave "The Damned" an "F" and hammered the episode by saying, "I don't understand what's happening with The Walking Dead...This is how TV shows die, not with a bang but with a whimper. What we're watching isn't high-stakes drama, it's a slow-motion train wreck."

=== Ratings ===
The episode averaged a 4.0 rating among adults 18-49, the lowest for the series since the penultimate episode of season 2, "Better Angels". A total of 8.92 million viewers tuned in, the least since the season 2 finale, "Beside the Dying Fire".
