= The Big Scary U =

- The Walking Dead episode
- Negan and Father Gabriel make their way through the herd, located outside the Sanctuary courtyard, covered in walker guts.
- Episode no.: Season 8 Episode 5
- Directed by: Michael E. Satrazemis
- Story by: Scott M. Gimple; David Leslie Johnson; Angela Kang
- Teleplay by: David Leslie Johnson; Angela Kang
- Cinematography by: Paul Varrieur
- Editing by: Dan Liu
- Original air date: November 19, 2017
- Running time: 52 minutes

Guest appearances
- Jayson Warner Smith as Gavin; Traci Dinwiddie as Regina; Elizabeth Ludlow as Arat; Lindsley Register as Laura; Mike Seal as Gary; Charles Halford as Yago; Jon Eyez as Potter; Jose Miguel Vasquez as Jose; Brooke Jaye Taylor as Brooke

Episode chronology
← Previous "Some Guy"	Next → "The King, the Widow, and Rick"
- The Walking Dead season 8

"The Big Scary U" is the fifth episode of the eighth season of the post-apocalyptic horror television series The Walking Dead, which aired on AMC on November 19, 2017. The episode's teleplay was written by David Leslie Johnson and Angela Kang, from a story by Scott M. Gimple, Johnson and Kang, and directed by Michael E. Satrazemis.

This episode mainly focuses on the events at the Sanctuary right before and after the combined attack. For the first time, minor details about Negan's backstory are revealed.

== Plot ==
In a flashback, Gabriel prays for a sense of purpose in church, while at the sanctuary Gregory bargains with Negan and his Savior lieutenants—Dwight, Simon, Gavin, Regina, and Eugene - offering to expel any Hilltop resident that sides with Rick. Simon suggests they can just wipe out Hilltop if they do not comply, but Negan sternly reminds him that they are useful resources. The meeting is broken up by the start of Rick's militia attack on the Sanctuary.

In the present, Gabriel finds himself trapped with Negan in a box trailer outside the Sanctuary, surrounded by a group of walkers. Negan doesn't kill Gabriel, but instead lulls him into talking about his past, Negan talks of his own past to gain Gabriel's confidence and help. Elsewhere, Rick and Daryl go to a dying Yago to find out what happened in the past battle. Yago reveals that all the Kingdom militia were killed, except for King Ezekiel, Jerry, and Carol. Yago dies, and Rick puts him down before he can reanimate.

Meanwhile, the Savior lieutenants believe Negan to be dead and discuss how they will handle the power vacuum. Gavin raises the possibility that the militia's attack succeeded due to inside information from one of them. Dwight, who had provided Rick with that information, diverts the discussion to issues with the anxious workers on the floor below, knowing that if they do not assert a form of authority, they could rebel. Leaving matters be for the time being, they return to their quarters. Eugene comes by to drop a gift of appreciation to Dwight, and notices a freshly-painted chess set in his room.

As he pushes Negan to reveal more about himself and to confess his sins, Gabriel manages to grab Negan's gun and escape into an adjoining room in the trailer. Negan offers to work together, and as Gabriel reflects on the betrayal of his own congregation, he accepts on the condition that Negan make a true confession. Negan confesses to being an unfaithful husband. They then work together to pull in and dispatch a few walkers to cover themselves in their viscera to make their way through the herd. Eventually their cover is blown and they have to fight their way through.

Rick takes the weapons aboard the Saviors’ truck they had prevented from returning to Sanctuary. He and Daryl get into an argument on what to do with the weapons, Daryl believes they should use them against the Saviors, while Rick sees a more humane solution. The argument turns to a fist-fight, which inadvertently results in a bag of dynamite being thrown at the truck, destroying it and the weapons. Daryl refuses to give Rick a return ride to Alexandria, leaving Rick to walk to the Scavengers.

Back in the main compound, Simon decides to cut off the Sanctuary's power to conserve resources. Several workers come upstairs to protest the conditions and demand to see Negan. The lieutenants lose control when one worker tries to pull a gun, but he is quickly shot and killed. Before the situation can go further Negan and Gabriel arrive, having fought their way through the herd. Negan quickly reasserts his authority and the workers obediently return to the lower floor. Negan tells his lieutenants to gently lock up Gabriel in a cell. The Saviors discover weapon bags among the workers and evidence that they were stolen from their armory by a Savior, then Eugene discovers a spot of paint on one bag, the same color as from Dwight's chess set. Negan privately asks Eugene to figure out how to rid them of the walkers around the Sanctuary. Later, Eugene goes to visit Gabriel and finds him quite ill from using the walker guts, and quickly calls for medical attention.

== Production ==
"The Big Scary U" features the first details of Negan's backstory within the television series. In the case of the comic series, Negan had been present within the narrative for about 50 issues before Robert Kirkman wrote Negan's backstory in "Here's Negan". Kirkman said that he purposely held off on giving Negan's background as he felt "that story works best when Negan has been around for many years". Similarly, how the television series was treating Negan's backstory had been unclear since his introduction at the end of season 6; Jeffrey Dean Morgan, who plays Negan in the show, was not clear of the character's background initially. Kirkman has stated he would like to see Negan's story play out on television through Morgan, but could not speak for how long the show plans to keep the character around.

== Reception ==
=== Critical reception ===
"The Big Scary U" received positive reviews from critics. On Rotten Tomatoes, it holds an 81% with an average rating of 7.07 out of 10, based on 27 reviews. The site's consensus reads: "The Big Scary U" slows down the action to spend some quality time with—and thereby humanize—two of its much-maligned cast members.

Noel Murray of Rolling Stone called "The Big Scary U" one of the season's best episodes because it provided more nuances to Negan's character than had been shown before, and because it filled in some of the story gaps of earlier episodes. Joe Otterson of Variety likewise called the episode "one of the more satisfying episodes of the season thus far" for focusing on Negan.

=== Ratings ===
The episode averaged a 3.4 rating among adults 18-49, and had a viewership of 7.85 million viewers, which marked a six-year low for the series.
