= The Civil Dead =

2022 film by Clay Tatum and Whitmer Thomas

- Theatrical release poster
- Directed by: Clay Tatum
- Written by: Clay Tatum; Whitmer Thomas
- Produced by: Clay Tatum; Whitmer Thomas
- Starring: Clay Tatum; Whitmer Thomas; Whitney Weir; Budd Diaz; Robert Longstreet
- Cinematography: Joshua Hill
- Edited by: Clay Tatum
- Music by: Max Whipple
- Production companies: RAW Media House; Lunar Studios; Jouse
- Distributed by: Utopia
- Release dates: January 27, 2022 (Slamdance Film Festival); February 3, 2023 (United States)
- Running time: 104 minutes
- Country: United States
- Language: English
- Budget: $30,000
- Box office: $32,346

The Civil Dead is a 2022 American comedy film directed by Clay Tatum, from a screenplay by Tatum and Whitmer Thomas. The cast features Tatum, Thomas, Whitney Weir, Budd Diaz, Robert Longstreet, Christian Lee Hutson, and Teresa Lee.

The film had its world premiere at the Slamdance Film Festival on January 27, 2022. It was released in the United States by Utopia on February 3, 2023.

== Plot ==
Clay is an unemployed photographer, living in Los Angeles with his wife, Whitney. When she leaves town for a work trip, he promises he'll get out of the house and take some photos. Clay tries a get-rich-quick scheme to pay rent, staging a fake open house in his apartment.

While shooting photos of a mattress spray painted with the phrase "5G killed my dog", Clay notices a man in the background and is annoyed that he is ruining the shot. Whit is pleased that Clay sees him and he insists on tagging along. The two are old friends from high school, but Clay had ignored Whit's texts when they separately moved to LA. Whit fills Clay in on his success as an actor in small indie roles.

The two spend the night at Clay's house, where Whit feigns drinking alcohol and falling asleep. In the morning, Clay asks Whit to leave, but Whit insists that he cannot: he's dead, unable to open doors or hold anything, and Clay is the only person that has been able to see or hear him since becoming a ghost. Clay takes a Polaroid of Whit and becomes distressed when the photo develops and Whit is not pictured.

Clay allows Whit to spend time with him while Whitney is out of town. Clay convinces Budd to bring him to a private poker game hosted by Arnold. Whit looks at everyone's cards undetected and communicates their contents to Clay. As they return home, Clay is attacked in an alley by a man he scammed at the open house. The man disappears into dust.

When Whitney returns to LA, Clay asks Whit to give him a week to figure out how to integrate Whit into his life, since Whitney cannot see or hear Whit. Whit reluctantly agrees to give Clay space and follows Belle, who had been the hostess at Arnold's game, home with her date.

In the morning, Clay tells Whitney that he got a job through his friend. He drives out of LA with Whit, where the two rent a cabin and attempt to devise a plan for Whit's undetected presence in Clay's life.

Clay leaves the cabin door open so Whit can come and go as he pleases. During a power outage, Clay is convinced that Whit has the ability to shut the lights off and accuses him of killing the man in the alley and other poltergeist powers. In the morning, Clay hides a broken statue of the cabin owner's beloved horse in the attic. Whit expresses gratitude for Clay's friendship and confesses that he is not a successful actor: he was a street performer dressed like Heath Ledger's Joker who was beaten to death by fellow performers dressed as Pennywise and Deadpool.

Clay and Whit share an awkward apology and Clay encourages Whit to check out the attic. Clay closes the attic ladder behind him. Whit, unable to escape, screams and begs Clay to let him out. Clay collects his things, gets in his car, and drives away.

== Cast ==
- Clay Tatum as Clay
- Whitmer Thomas as Whit
- Whitney Weir as Whitney
- Budd Diaz as Budd
- Robert Longstreet as Arnold
- Teresa Lee as Belle
- Christian Lee Hutson as Belle's Date
- Anthony Oberbeck as Chucky
- DeMorge Brown as Hippie
- Anna Seregina as Cabin Couple
- Chris Thayer as Cabin Couple

Additional unnamed roles are played by Mitra Jouhari, Trinidad James, and Problem.

== Production ==
Tatum and Thomas wrote, produced, and shot the film during the COVID-19 pandemic. According to Tatum, the film was shot on a shoestring budget and was funded by an old friend of Tatum's from college. The producer had come across his shorts and offered Tatum $30,000 to shoot a feature. The pair previously attempted, unsuccessfully, to finance the project via gambling.

The cabin in the film was in Frazier Mountain, California, where the production team broke a family heirloom of the owner, which mirrors the breaking of the Blueberry horse statue in the movie.

== Release ==
The film had its world premiere at the Slamdance Film Festival on January 27, 2022, and was released in the United States by Utopia on February 3, 2023. Alamo Drafthouse Cinema hosted Q&A showings with Tatum and Thomas throughout the US. The film was released in the United Kingdom on January 19, 2024. It was released in France by Damned Distribution under the title Ghost Therapy.

=== Critical reception ===
On the review aggregator website Rotten Tomatoes, 100% of 32 critics' reviews are positive, with an average rating of 7.1/10. The website's consensus reads: "With a satisfying blend of humor and melancholy, The Civil Dead finds creative partners Clay Tatum and Whitmer Thomas taking a haunting look at the pitfalls of friendship." Metacritic, which uses a weighted average, assigned the film a score of 66 out of 100, based on 5 critics, indicating "generally favorable" reviews.

Jeannette Catsoulis of The New York Times noted, "The movie's lighting is warm and the soundtrack close to perfect, yet underneath lies a persistent melancholy, a pervasive sense of men not making it in a place where the true terror is loneliness" and Noel Murray of the Los Angeles Times wrote, "The movie's premise is clever; but what really makes it work is that these two use this ghost schtick as a way to examine the ways that friendship can be a hassle."

Regarding the chemistry of characters and overall tone, C.J. Prince of The Film Stage wrote, "The fact that both leads are real-life friends goes a long way, given the baggy pacing and some of the more uneven comedic moments, and Tatum's usage of long takes helps increase the awkward tension of both characters' forced arrangement."

In December 2023, Esquire named The Civil Dead as the 20th best movie of 2023, praising it as "enormously funny" and "a very promising debut."

=== Accolades ===
The Civil Dead won the Audience Award for Best Narrative Feature at the 2022 Slamdance Film Festival. It won the Jury Award for Best North American Narrative Feature at the 2022 Mammoth Lakes Film Festival. It won Best Film and Tatum won Best Director in the Shooting Star Feature category at Nòt Film Fest.
