= Whitmer Thomas =

American comedian, actor and musician

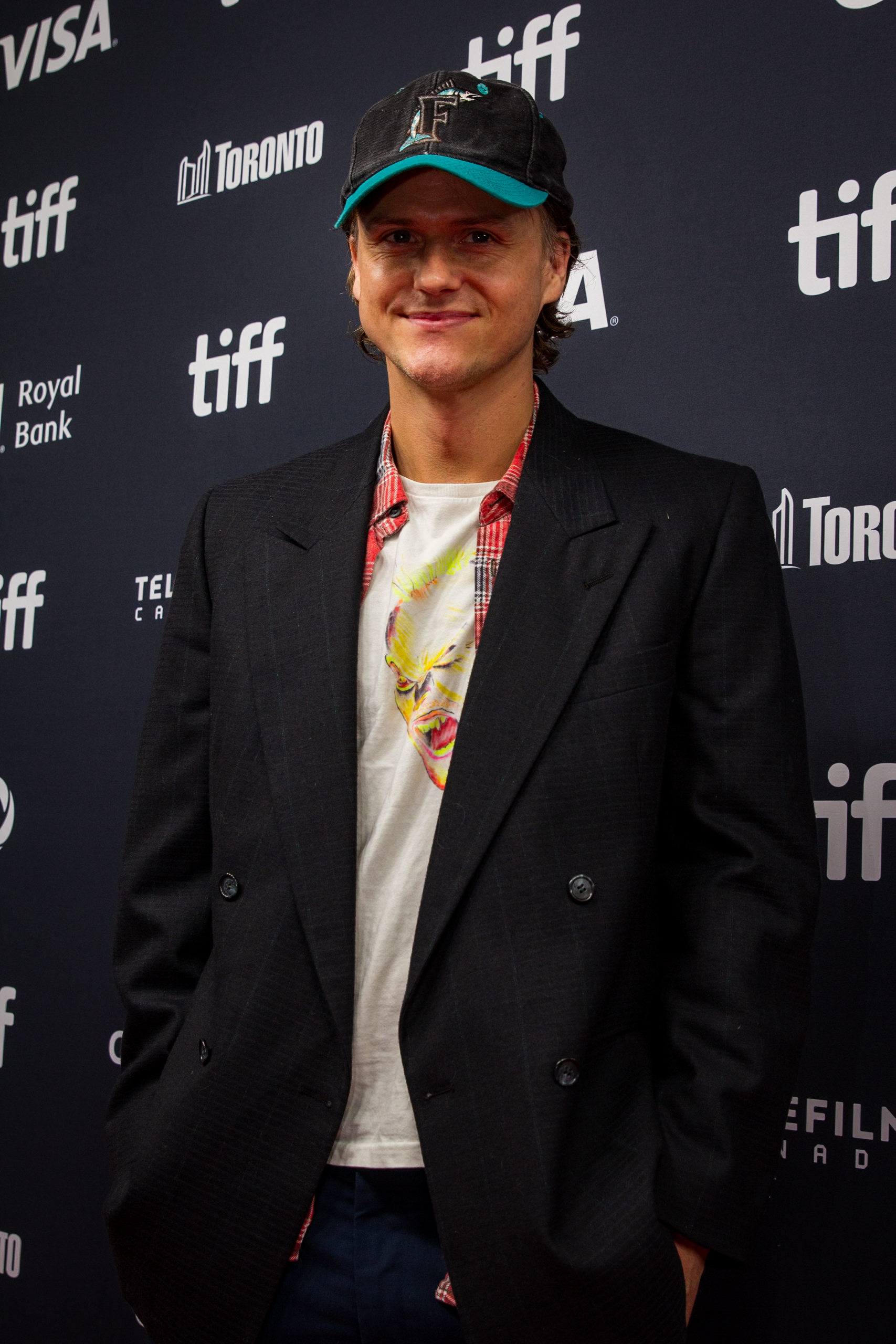
- Thomas in 2024
- Born: Whitmer Alexander Thomas
- Notable work: Stone Quackers; The Golden One; The Older I Get The Funnier I Was; Slip

Comedy career
- Years active: 2008–present
- Genres: Musical comedy, anecdotal comedy, observational comedy

Whitmer Alexander Thomas is an American comedian, actor, and musician.

He is best known for his voice role on FXX animated comedy Stone Quackers (2014–2015), and his work with LA-based comedy troupe Power Violence.

Thomas's hour-long comedy special, The Golden One, premiered on HBO on February 22, 2020. An accompanying album, Songs from the Golden One, was released via Hardly Art Records. Thomas's sophomore record, The Older I Get The Funnier I Was, was released on October 21, 2022.

== Early life ==
Whitmer Thomas was raised in Gulf Shores, Alabama. His mother, Jenny Henderson, founded the musical duo Syn Twister with her twin sister Jude Hammock. The previous occupation of Thomas's father, Whit Thomas, is unclear; as of 2020, he is employed as a paralegal. Thomas has one older brother, Johnny.

As a three-year-old, Thomas was abducted from his family home. The abduction was thwarted by Thomas's father; the perpetrator, who had been stalking Thomas since the day of his birth, subsequently died in prison.

Throughout his youth, Thomas was an avid skateboarder and avowed fan of Blink-182. He shared these interests with Clay Tatum: a childhood friend and future member of Power Violence. Tatum later directed The Golden One, a comedy special that details much of Thomas's early life.

Thomas's parents separated when he was enrolled in the fourth grade. Both his mother and father battled with substance addiction; whereas Whit ultimately achieved sobriety, Jenny died from complications arising from her alcoholism in 2009.

Thomas did not attend college. Instead, he relocated to Los Angeles to pursue an acting career shortly before his mother's death.

== Career ==
=== Career beginnings and Power Violence (2008–2014) ===
Thomas launched his comedy career at the age of eighteen in 2008. Having moved to Los Angeles, he was joined by his childhood friends from Gulf Shores, Alabama: Clay Tatum and Jeramy Ritchie. The trio joined forces with their new roommates, Budd Diaz and Rodney Berry, to form the comedy troupe Power Violence.

For over four years, Power Violence performed every Sunday night at Santa Monica Boulevard. Thomas and his associates screened self-produced comedy videos and performed original bits featuring elaborate props and stunts. These performances attracted coverage from Time Out LA and Vulture. The official Power Violence Facebook page has been defunct since 2018.

=== Solo comedy career and television acting (2014–2019) ===
In 2014, Thomas and former Power Violence collaborator Clay Tatum became the executive producers of Stone Quackers. This FXX animated series concerned the surreal misadventures of two ducks. Thomas and Tatum also voiced the co-protagonists, Whit and Clay, who were based on their teenage selves. Stone Quackers was created by Ben Jones and cancelled after one season.

Thomas also became a prolific television actor in the mid-2010s. Notably, he lent his voice to guest roles on Tuca & Bertie and Close Enough. Thomas also appeared in the critically acclaimed live-action series GLOW, The Walking Dead and The Good Place. In 2019, he played a major supporting role in Sword of Trust, Lynn Shelton's final film as director.

As a solo stand-up comedian, Thomas rose to prominence in 2015. Thomas's Tom DeLonge impression, an intrinsic part of his act, was featured on the Put Your Hands Together and the You Made It Weird with Pete Holmes podcasts. The bit caught the attention of Blink-182's bassist and co-vocalist Mark Hoppus; Thomas and Hoppus now play together in a semi-active comedic cover band, Snake Plissken and The I Thought You Were Deads.

Thomas found further viral success with "Big Baby" and its sequel, "Big Baby Christmas", in 2020. These musical skits see Thomas singing nonsensical lyrics while an Instagram filter de-ages his face. They were produced in response to Tom Papa's #LiveFromHome challenge for quarantined comedians; Thomas was nominated to participate by his friend Rory Scovel. Across YouTube, Twitter, and Instagram, the 'Big Baby' music videos have accrued over one million views.

Thomas has also toured the world with Sketchfest, and the New York and Melbourne International Comedy Festivals. In 2016, Thomas opened for Bo Burnham on the Make Happy tour. Burnham later executive-produced The Golden One, Thomas's autobiographical stand-up special, in 2020.

=== The Golden One and Songs From The Golden One (2020) ===
The Golden One, Thomas's debut comedy special, was filmed at the Flora-Bama Lounge in 2019. Thomas performed at the Lounge in honour of his aunt and late mother, whose new wave duo Syn Twister behaved as the house band and local celebrities. The resultant recording premiered on HBO on February 22, 2020.

The special concerns Thomas's early life in Alabama, the emotional arc of which centres on the redemption of his absent father Whit. Thomas also mines various childhood traumas for laughs, such as his failed abduction, the death of his mother, and the subsequent estrangement of his aunt. The jokes and autobiographical stories are interspersed with pre-recorded vignettes and original songs.

The Golden One's title originates from the last words Thomas's mother uttered before her premature death. Accordingly, the show encompasses themes of grief, loss, addiction, familial love and existential dread. "Hurts to Be Alive" and "The Golden One", the lyrics of which were directly lifted from Thomas's early hardships, have received particular critical attention.

The hour-long recording was co-directed by Thomas and Tatum; among its executive producers are Bo Burnham, Christopher Storer, Olivia Gerke, and Ravi Nandan and Inman Young for A24.

The special features nine original songs, all of which were written and performed by Thomas. The show concludes with a cover of Syn Twister's "He's Hot". An accompanying soundtrack, Songs from the Golden One, was released on CD and vinyl in February 2020. Individual music videos for "Partied to Death", "Dancing with My Dad" and "Dumb in Love" have been uploaded to Thomas's YouTube account.

The Golden One currently holds a 100% approval rating from review aggregator Rotten Tomatoes. Songs from the Golden One has also garnered critical acclaim and a 7.7/10 rating from music publication Pitchfork.

=== Can't Believe You're Happy Here and The Older I Get The Funnier I Was (2022–) ===
March 2022 saw the release of Thomas's EP, Can't Believe You're Happy Here, on Hardly Art Records. The six-track EP was produced by Melina Duterte (Jay Som), and features contributions from Christian Lee Hutson and Al Menne of Great Grandpa. The release of Can't Believe You're Happy Here coincided with a music video for "Don't Have A Cow", which was uploaded to YouTube. Raphael Helfand of The Fader noted that "the record sounds crisp and clean while maintaining a distinctly DIY undercurrent".

Can't Believe You're Happy Here is a folk record that engages with themes of toxic masculinity, self-doubt and existentialism. Thomas notes that the EP was informed by numerous influences, including self-reflection precipitated by the COVID-19 pandemic, YouTube countdown lists, and his friendship with Hutson.

Thomas's second album, The Older I Get The Funnier I Was, was released on October 21, 2022. As with the preceding Can't Believe You're Happy Here EP, the record was produced by Melina Duterte. Other contributors to the record include Al Menne, Christian Lee Hutson, and Harrison Whitford.

A music video was released for the lead single, "Rigmarole", in August 2022. Thomas has explained that the song is about "trying to shake depression with routine and ultimately accepting I've got no choice but to sink into it". According to Pitchfork, the remaining songs on the album explore themes like Thomas's people-pleasing tendencies and relationship with his father.

Thomas toured North America with Al Menne in support of The Older I Get The Funnier I Was. Thomas also performed a new stand-up routine, Big Baby, at the Elysian Theater in Los Angeles throughout the final quarter of 2022. The show featured stories and songs lifted from Thomas's youth, and also engaged with concepts of loneliness, insecurity and Christopher Nolan's The Dark Knight trilogy. Alternative comedian Conner O'Malley performed as Thomas's opening act.

Thomas also appeared in numerous films and television series in the early 2020s. He played substantive roles in Am I OK?, a comedy drama that premiered at the 2022 Sundance Film Festival, and Clay Tatum's supernatural comedy The Civil Dead. Thomas has been confirmed to appear in two 2023 television series: Slip and #1 Happy Family USA.

==== Whitmer Thomas: Terminal Crew of Dudes ====
HBO released Whitmer Thomas: Terminal Crew of Dudes to HBO Max on August 14th, 2026. He performs with the titular backing band consisting of his brother, Johnny, and his close friends with whom he grew up skateboarding. Along with original songs, Thomas delves into stories involving his bandmates and relates the experience of being a grown adult that still skateboards.

== Filmography ==
=== Film ===
Year	Title	Role	Notes
2009	Boulevard Zen	Elliott Anderson	Film debut
2009	Green Valley	Store Clerk 1	
2010	Suicide Dolls	Cameron	
2010	On Holiday	Peyton	
2011	Uncle Kent	Party Guest	
2011	0s & 1s	Corey	
2014	Jerked	Whit	
2015	Tooken	Joe	
2019	Sword of Trust	Jake	
2020	Deported	Ross	
2020	A Dim Valley	Albert	
2020	The Immortal Jellyfish	Denny	
2021	Homebody	Tom	
2021	Kendra and Beth	Robbie	
2022	The Civil Dead	Whit	
2022	Am I Ok?	Ben	
2022	Moon Manor	Forest	
2024	Friendship	Ian	
2025	Weapons	Mr. Lilly	
TBA	Untitled Arkasha Stevenson film		Post-production

=== Television ===
Year	Title	Role	Notes
2008	Palisades Pool Party	Josh	TV movie
2008–2011	Poor Paul	Patricia	13 episodes
2012	Ben and Kate	Toad	Episode: "21st Birthday"
2013–2014	Pound House	BBQ Guest / Skater Friend	2 episodes
2014	Workaholics	Stoner Kid	Episode: "Timechair"
2014	Crazy House	Whitmer Keaton	TV movie
2014–2015	Stone Quackers	Whit (voice)	12 episodes
2015	Gothball	Whit	Miniseries, 2 episodes
2015	Questionable Science	Matthew McConaughey	TV series
2016	Sing It!	Garrett McKinley	Episode: "Let's Sell Out!"
2016	Nuclear Family	Barista	Episode: "Underwritten Female Character: The Movie"
2017	Super Deluxe Digital	Jake	Episode: "RIP Friends"
2017	You're the Worst	Flynn	Episode: "Dad-Not-Dad"
2017	The Walking Dead	Gunther	Episode: "Some Guy"
2018	Ghosted	Lukas	Episode: "Hello Boys"
2018	Townies	The Meanest Boy in Town	Episode: "The Killer Instinct"
2018	GLOW	Justin	2 episodes
2018	The Good Place	Gatorbait	Episode: "Everything Is Bonzer!"
2019	Sunnyside	Brian	Episode: "Multicultural Tube of Meat"
2019, 2022	Tuca & Bertie	The Deli Guy (voice)	2 episodes
2020	Kwaczala	John Lennon	Episode: "You Know What, Guys"
2020	Close Enough	The Gooch (voice)	Episode: "Skate Dad/100% No Stress Day"
2021	Shrill	Joe	Episode: "Ribs"
2021	I Think You Should Leave with Tim Robinson	Brian	Episode: "They said that to me at a dinner."
2022	Search Party	Pat	Episode: "Song of Songs"
2022	Three Busy Debras	Radio DJ / Chompitos	2 episodes
2023	Slip	Elijah	5 episodes
2023	Big Mouth	Camus Boy / Camden / Sad Boy #1 (voice)	Episode: "A Finger in Time" / Season 8

== Discography ==
- Songs from the Golden One (2020, Hardly Art Records)
- Can't Believe You're Happy Here - EP (2022, Hardly Art Records)
- The Older I Get the Funnier I Was (2022, Hardly Art Records)
