= Lee Norris =

American actor (born 1981)

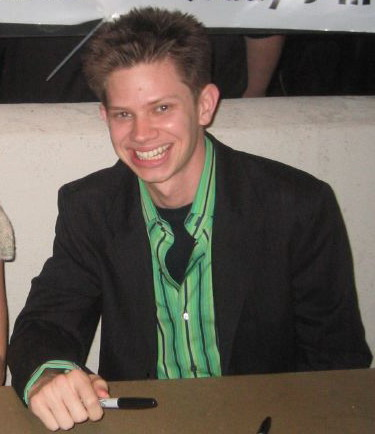
- Norris in 2006
- Born: Lee Michael Norris; September 25, 1981 (age 45); Greenville, North Carolina, U.S.
- Education: Wake Forest University (BA)
- Occupation: Actor
- Years active: 1991–present
- Spouse: Andrea Norris (m. 2011)
- Children: 1

Lee Michael Norris (born September 25, 1981) is an American actor, best known for his roles as Stuart Minkus on Boy Meets World and its spin-off Girl Meets World, as well as Marvin "Mouth" McFadden on One Tree Hill.

Norris appeared as a recurring character in the first two seasons of Boy Meets World spinoff series Girl Meets World, reprising his role as Stuart Minkus, in which he is now a billionaire and the father of a teenage son named Farkle Minkus (Corey Fogelmanis). The same year he starred as Todd in "The Damned" & "Monsters", two episodes of The Walking Dead.

== Filmography ==
=== Film ===
Year	Title	Role	Notes
1995	The Journey of August King	Silver Boy	
1996	A Step Toward Tomorrow	Perry	
2006	Surf School	Larry	
2007	Zodiac	Mike Mageau	
2010	Blood Done Sign My Name	Roger Oakley	
2014	Gone Girl	Officer	
2020	Greyhound	Messenger #2	

=== Television ===
Year	Title	Role	Notes
1991–1993	The Torkelsons	Chuckie Lee Torkelson	Main role
1993	The Young Indiana Jones Chronicles	Kid #1	Episode: "Transylvania, January 1918"
1993–1998	Boy Meets World	Stuart Minkus	Main role (season 1), guest (season 5)
1995	American Gothic	Benji Healy	Episode: "Dead to the World"
1996	A Mother's Instinct	Jeremy / Joey	TV movie
1997	Any Place But Home	John Wesley	TV movie
1997	Hope	Billy October	TV movie
2000	Dawson's Creek	Actor #2, Random Student #2	Episodes: "Barefoot at Capefest" & "To Green, with Love"
2003–2012	One Tree Hill	Marvin 'Mouth' McFadden	Recurring role (seasons 1 & 2), main (seasons 3–9)
2007	October Road	Ian	Episode: "Pilot"
2012	Paulilu Mixtape	Young Dad	Episode: "Anne Geddes: Beneath the Diaper"
2014–2017	Girl Meets World	Stuart Minkus	Recurring role
2017	The Walking Dead	Todd	Episodes: "The Damned" & "Monsters"
2019	A Christmas Wish	Ryan	TV movie
