= Rick Grimes =

Main protagonist in The Walking Dead

- The Walking Dead character
- Rick Grimes, the former deputy sheriff, as portrayed by Andrew Lincoln in the television series (left), and in the comic book series (right).
- First appearance: Comic: "Issue #1" (2003); Rick Grimes 2000: "Issue #75" (2010); Television: "Days Gone Bye" (2010); Literature: "The Fall of the Governor - Part One" (2013)
- Last appearance: Comic: "Issue #192" (2019); Rick Grimes 2000: Skybound X (2021); Television: "The Last Time" (2024); Literature: "The Fall of the Governor - Part Two" (2014)
- Created by: Robert Kirkman; Tony Moore
- Adapted by: Frank Darabont (The Walking Dead)
- Portrayed by: Andrew Lincoln
- Voiced by: Phil LaMarr (Motion comic); Keith Ferguson (Onslaught); Andrew Lincoln (Call of Duty: Modern Warfare III, Dead by Daylight, World War Z)

In-universe information
- Full name: Richie Grimes (comic); Richard D. Grimes (television)
- Occupation: Comic: Former Police Officer; Former Leader of The Survivors and the Alexandria Safe-Zone; Former Constable for the Alexandria Safe-Zone; Former Co-Leader of the Militia; Television: Deputy for King County Sheriff's Department; Former Co-Leader of the Atlanta Camp; Former Leader of the Prison community Former Constable for the Alexandria Safe-Zone; Former Leader of the Alexandria Safe-Zone; Former Co-Leader of the Militia; Former Consignee for the Civic Republic Military; Former Sergeant Major for the Civic Republic Military
- Affiliation: Atlanta Camp (formerly); The Survivors (formerly); Prison Community (formerly); Alexandria Safe-Zone (formerly); The Militia (formerly); Comic: The Commonwealth (formerly); Television: King County's Sheriff Department (formerly; pre-apocalypse); Civic Republic Military (formerly); The Coalition
- Weapon: Hatchet; Colt Python
- Family: Comic: Jeffrey Grimes (brother); Andrea Grimes II (granddaughter); Sophia Grimes (daughter-in-law)
- Spouses: Lori Grimes (late wife); Comic: Andrea Grimes; TV Series: Michonne Grimes
- Children: Carl Grimes (son); Judith Grimes (adopted daughter); TV Series: Rick Grimes Jr. (son)

Rick Grimes (full name in the television series: Richard D. Grimes; full name in the comic book series: Richie Grimes) is a fictional character and the protagonist of the post-apocalyptic comic book series The Walking Dead, the live-action television series of the same name and its franchise, in which he is portrayed by Andrew Lincoln. Created by writer Robert Kirkman and artist Tony Moore, the character made his debut in The Walking Dead #1 in 2003. Rick is a small town sheriff's deputy and is married to Lori. They have a son, Carl, and a daughter, Judith. He awakens from a coma after a life-threatening gunshot wound to find the world overrun by reanimated humans dubbed "walkers".

In the comic book series The Walking Dead, Rick served as the protagonist, with the series' epilogue taking place decades after his death. In both media, Rick awakens from a coma into the apocalypse and searches for Lori and Carl, finding them in the Atlanta camp where he becomes the group's leader. Although Rick quickly adapts to the notion of killing walkers, his morality towards the living is constantly tested against the safety of his family and friends. Over time, after multiple conflicts with other survivors, his morals diminish and he becomes "colder" towards his enemies. Rick struggles to keep his humanity intact throughout the series. He is tested by his own group when encountering non-group members, who believe his community should join them. Rick manages to rebuild his convictions through agreeing to join, and becoming a father once more, but antagonists' exploitation of his group ushers him to maintain a hardened stance. Ultimately, they succeed in rebuilding society. An alternate version of Rick, dubbed Rick Grimes 2000, is introduced in Issue 75 in 2010, from a reality where an alien invasion occurred in the midst of the "Alexandria" arc and Rick was rebuilt as a cyborg to face a resurrected Governor; a comic book limited series following the character, Skybound X: Rick Grimes 2000, was released from July 7 to August 4, 2021.

Rick has been described as an everyman character who emphasizes moral codes and values. Lincoln obtained the role in April 2010; Kirkman felt he was an "amazing find". In preparation for the role, Lincoln sought inspiration from Gary Cooper in his work in the American western film High Noon (1952), as well as the television drama series Breaking Bad. Lincoln has been well-received for his portrayal of the character, and has been nominated for several awards, winning the Saturn Award for Best Actor on Television in 2015 and 2017.

== Appearances ==
=== Comic book series ===
Before the zombie apocalypse, Rick was a police officer in Cynthiana, Kentucky. While in a shootout against an escaped convict with his partner and best friend, Shane Walsh, Rick is wounded and subsequently awakens from a coma some time later. After Duane Jones mistakes Rick for a zombie and hits him over the head with a shovel, Duane's father Morgan Jones takes Rick in and informs him about what unfolded during his coma. In search of his wife, Lori, and son, Carl, Rick heads to Atlanta, where he knew Lori had family and where he believes they may have escaped. Rick runs out of gas and stops at a farm. Rick finds the owners inside who have committed suicide. Rick then searches their barn where he finds a horse. Upon arrival, Rick is rescued from a large group of walkers by a fellow survivor named Glenn Rhee, who takes him to a camp where Rick is reunited with his wife Lori and son Carl, as well as Shane. Tension between Rick and Shane over leadership of the group and Lori's affections boils over in a confrontation which ends with Carl shooting Shane to protect his father. Afterwards, Rick leads the group away from Atlanta, trying to find shelter and safe haven from the undead. Rick's early settlement plan proves to be disastrous, as the abandoned planned community he thought to be safe is ultimately found to be zombie infested, resulting in a death of one of their own. Lori Grimes, Rick's wife, shamefully admits to Rick that she is pregnant (presumably with Shane's baby), but Rick plans to care for it. Carl Grimes, Rick's son, is accidentally shot in the back by a man named Otis, who escorts Rick and another survivor, Tyreese, a recently joined member of Rick's group to the farm of Hershel Greene and his family. The group stays there for a brief amount of time before Rick is held at gunpoint by Hershel and forced to move out. While on the road again, two other members of the survivors discover a prison, where everyone seeks refuge and settles down.

==== Prison arc (2004–2008) ====
Rick and the group settle into the prison where they meet the former prison inmates who hadn't managed to escape. Rick and Dale Horvath soon decide it is best to have as many people as possible at his new settlement, and decide to convince Hershel and his family to leave the farm and join him at the prison, as the farm grows increasingly precarious. The group's concept of the prison being a safe haven quickly diminishes when Rick and Tyreese find Tyreese's daughter, Julie, shot dead in a suicide pact with her boyfriend, who remained alive. Julie surprisingly reanimates as a roamer, which causes the revelation that everyone is infected with the mysterious virus, regardless of being bitten or not. After this event, the inmates try to assimilate with Rick's group with mostly disastrous results. This leads Rick into his first murder, that of the inmate Dexter, during an armed conflict with the other inmates. Weeks after their conflict with the prisoners, Rick, Glenn, and the mysterious, katana-wielding woman Michonne, search for a nearby crashed helicopter which leads them into the town of Woodbury, Georgia. At the town, they meet a man called The Governor, who leads Woodbury by extreme manipulation, cunningness, and ruthlessness. Fooled by The Governor's pseudo-hospitality, like most Woodbury inhabitants, Rick ultimately has his right hand severed in an attempt to get him to reveal the location of the prison. When The Governor sees Rick will never give up his family, he decides to torture both Glenn and Michonne instead, but yet again fails to find the location of the prison. Rick escapes the town with his group and new ally, Alice Warren, after Michonne exacts her revenge on The Governor, as she tortures and mutilates him. Rick happily reunites with his family after his captivity in Woodbury. Alice also begins updating Lori on her pregnancy. Alice delivers Lori's baby, whom the Grimes family name "Judith". However, their happiness is short-lived when The Governor, now horribly disfigured, finds the prison and captures Tyreese and Michonne. He manipulates his followers into believing Rick's group are marauders. During the final assault on the prison, Tyreese is executed in front of the group as an act of force to lure the group out of the prison, and both sides suffer significant losses. Lori and Judith are killed as they try to escape.

==== Post-prison (2008–2009) ====
Carl is enraged by Rick, claiming him responsible for their losses. Rick also begins to suffer hallucinations of his wife. The survivors of the prison assault — Rick, Michonne and Carl — return to Hershel's farm where they reunite with the remainder of the prison group who left before the assault. They meet a new group of survivors who are on a mission to Washington, D.C., which consist of Abraham Ford (the leader), Eugene Porter (a man who claims to have knowledge on the cure, requesting to go to D.C.) and Rosita Espinosa (Abraham's girlfriend). On the journey to D.C., the group face many threats. As Rick and Abraham take the interstate to Rick's hometown, they are confronted by a group of marauders who hold them at gunpoint, as one tries to sexually assault Carl. Rick, overcome with rage, bites one of the bandits' jugular vein, which distracts the other bandits. Abraham shoots the bandit holding him at gunpoint and comforts Carl as Rick proceeds to stab the remaining bandit to death. Rick later reunites with Morgan in his hometown, who has lost his sanity after his son's death. Rick, Abraham, Carl and Morgan encounter a large horde who follow them back to the survivors' camp. Later, after suffering several losses, the group meets a preacher named Gabriel Stokes and confronts a cannibalistic group of hunters.

==== Alexandria (2009–2011) ====
On the way to the capital, they find out that their mission is bogus as Eugene Porter has been lying to them about the cure. They decide to still push on to D.C. because of their close proximity, and they find out that the capital is just as infested as the other major cities. Despite these set backs, they are recruited by Aaron to stay in a secluded and secure township on the outskirts of Washington, called the Alexandria Safe-Zone. Each person tries to find a semblance of real life, but Rick doesn't trust the leader of the town, former U.S. Congressman Douglas Monroe. Rick soon becomes the Constable of the Safe-Zone, attempting to keep the peace in the town, but is eventually forced to kill Peter Anderson, a man who was abusing his wife and child and soon murdered Regina Monroe, Douglas' wife, during an assassination attempt on Rick's life. Rick having been through so much since the prison, slowly starts resuming more leadership-like roles until finally Rick assumes leadership of the Alexandria Safe-Zone, after Douglas soon finds himself losing his grip on life, and his leadership position exacerbating as a result of this. The town becomes endangered after a scavenging group's attack attracts a nearby horde of walkers that quickly breach the town's defensive walls. Morgan and Jessie are two of several casualties in the distress of the situation. As the survivors fight for their lives, several people are killed and Rick's son is grievously wounded by a gunshot to the head. Using the combined strength of all of those remaining in the community, the survivors fend off the horde and Rick tends to Carl, whose condition is very dire. Following the attack, Rick concludes that the undead can be beaten if the survivors put their differences aside and work together. Rick mentions that this is the first time in very long that he has hope for the future. Rick's mindset on survival changes and he gradually develops an optimistic outlook on the community and its true potential. Later, Carl wakes up from his coma with minor amnesia. Rick worries that the son he knew is gone, as he shows no grief over the loss of Lori. A small insurrection is later formed but defused without bloodshed and Rick forgives the transgressors. Rick and Andrea continue to become very close concerning Carl in his coma. Andrea develops feelings for Rick. Rick resists out of fear of what might happen to him in the event of her death.

==== Networking communities (2011–2012) ====
Paul Monroe, an ambassador from a community of two-hundred survivors called the Hilltop Colony, visits Alexandria to start a trading network with Rick's community. After some mistrust, Rick agrees to go to the Hilltop Colony and starts the trading network. At the Hilltop, Paul Monroe admits that the Hilltop Colony have enemies. He tells them of the infamous Negan, who some speculate may not even be a person. The group learn of the Saviors, the Hilltop's rival community who frequently terrorize them and threaten to damage their community if they are not brought half of their supplies. Rick agrees to defuse their conflict in exchange for half of their supplies. Rick's group are ambushed by a group of the Saviors after they leave the Hilltop Colony. Rick's group retaliates, killing them. He sends the lone survivor back to Negan with a warning to stop terrorizing the residents of the Hilltop and that Negan and his men can pay them half of everything they have in exchange for his protection. Rick and Andrea return to the Safe-Zone to discover Abraham has been murdered and Eugene is being held hostage. Residents of the Safe-Zone discover the Saviors are outside of the walls, quickly killing them. Rick and several others including Glenn and Maggie decide to go back to the Hilltop Colony where Glenn and Maggie plan to live. Negan appears to the survivors surrounded by his men, taunting them before brutally beating Glenn to death. Rick and the others watch in horror and Maggie and Sophia later leave Rick to go to the Hilltop. Now realizing the full scale of Negan's army, Rick intentionally gives in, allowing Negan to take all of Alexandria's supplies.

==== War against Negan (2012–2014) ====
Rick remains at conflict with Negan and the Saviors. Carl reveals to his father that the Saviors live in a factory. Paul Monroe tells Rick that they should see King Ezekiel, the leader of the Kingdom. Ezekiel, residing in a high school, greets Paul Monroe and welcomes Rick to his community. He agrees to work with Rick, and explains that he has another visitor, Dwight, a Savior secretly working against Negan. Rick, initially angry with Dwight's appearance, eventually forms an alliance with him, but remains wary of whether to trust Dwight or not. During the war, the Alexandria Safe-Zone, the Kingdom and the Sanctuary suffer many losses. Rick rescues Andrea and Carl when the Alexandria Safe-Zone is bombed by the Saviors. Maggie, now the de facto leader of the Hilltop Colony, relocates the residents to the Hilltop, where all three communities unite. Negan arrives at the Hilltop Colony as the Saviors break down the front gates and swarm the community. Rick orders the survivors to open fire, destroying the truck that smashed through, killing several Saviors in the process. During the firefight, Rick takes Nicholas and Aaron to box in the attackers. While they take cover, Rick unknowingly leaves himself vulnerable from behind. Negan, who separates from the other Saviors with Dwight, finds Rick at a close distance and demands that Dwight shoot him with his infected crossbow. Dwight shows some hesitation, but is ultimately forced to shoot Rick. An arrow pierces Rick's side, taking him down, but Dwight's loyalties are revealed to be on Rick's side as he has not succumbed to the infection. He confronts Negan, showing his perspective, and Negan finally understands Rick's view of rebuilding society. In response, Rick slashes Negan's throat before Negan breaks his leg. Negan passes out, before he is saved by a doctor. Rick chooses to imprison Negan, believing that watching the regrowth of civilization from behind a cell is a better punishment than killing him. Dwight takes over as leader of the Saviors, supporting Rick and the war is won.

==== Post-war/time skip (2014–2019) ====
An indefinite number of years later, Rick and the others have rebuilt Alexandria into a thriving sanctuary. He welcomes newcomers Magna and her group who are initially wary of the safe haven, but come to understand the running of it. Carl convinces his father to let him relocate to the Hilltop Colony to become a blacksmith apprentice. Rick reunites with Maggie Greene and her adoptive daughter Sophia when he brings Carl to the Hilltop. Rick leaves Carl under Maggie's care. Unaware that his son has joined Alpha and the Whisperers, a tribe of thousands who disguise themselves as walkers, Rick reunites with Michonne as a ship arrives revealing her presence. He is concerned by her behavior, telling her to sort out her issues and move on after the loss of her daughters. Later, as Michonne and Rick go to Alexandria to attend a fair that has been planned for months, they discover Carl is missing and decide to go after him. Alpha confronts them, marching Rick at gunpoint to an unknown building where he sees thousands of Whisperers. Michonne's sword is smeared with blood. Alpha decides to leave her daughter Lydia who has feelings for Carl, with Rick, believing her to be a weakness. She criticizes Rick's leadership and trying to re-establish society as it had been, before telling him she has marked a border. As Rick reaches the border, he is horrified to find many civilians from each of the four communities decapitated, including Ezekiel and the pregnant Rosita. Michonne begins to cry as Andrea solemnly asks him what they do next. Rick decides to tell the communities, who take it terribly. He is attacked by two of the citizens. One man made it out alive, the other, Morton Rose, the husband of one of the decapitated victims, did not. He starts training the people of the joined communities to fight against walkers as well as the Whisperers.

==== Skybound X ====
===== Issue 75: Bonus Ending (2010) =====
After being hit over the head by Michonne, Rick awakes in an exploding scientific infirmary, finding his missing hand to have been restored and replaced with a robotic one. Donning armor held in his room, he falls out of a sky ship onto the ground below, where he witnesses Glenn and Douglas be torn apart by walkers. Michonne arrives on the scene and informs Rick that he had suddenly disappeared three weeks previously, a few days after which aliens had invaded and revealed themselves responsible for the creation of walkers and the downfall of human civilization, planning to use the surviving humans to harvest water, used as a currency on their planet. Rick then witnesses a resurrected cyborg Governor attack Michonne, with an also-resurrected Lori standing by his side. After being told to either join him or die, Rick smiles and prepares for battle.

=== Television series ===
TV show	Seasons										
TV show	1	2	3	4	5	6	7	8	9	10	11
The Walking Dead	Main										Guest
Fear the Walking Dead				Guest							
The Walking Dead: The Ones Who Live	Main										

==== The Walking Dead ====
===== Season 1 =====
In the series premiere, "Days Gone Bye", sheriff's deputies Rick and his best friend, Shane Walsh (Jon Bernthal), are in a gun battle with escaped convicts. Having been shot, Rick lies in a coma while the zombie apocalypse begins. After awakening alone in the hospital, he walks through the neighborhood but is mistaken for a walker and hit over the head with a shovel by a child, Duane Jones (Adrian Kali Turner). Duane's father Morgan (Lennie James) takes Rick in and explains the sickness to him. Rick sets off in search of his wife, Lori (Sarah Wayne Callies), and young son, Carl (Chandler Riggs), along the way witnessing what has happened to the world. In downtown Atlanta, Rick is attacked by a horde of walkers and hides inside a tank. In the episode "Guts", a young man named Glenn Rhee (Steven Yeun) rescues Rick from the tank and leads him to a group of survivors scavenging for supplies. The group flees the city, forced to leave troublesome group member Merle Dixon (Michael Rooker), who was handcuffed by Rick, behind. In the episode "Tell It to the Frogs", the survivors lead Rick to their campsite where he happily reunites with Lori, Carl, and Shane. Merle's brother Daryl Dixon (Norman Reedus), however, demands that a group return to the city to find him; Rick also wants to retrieve a bag of guns. They discover that Merle cut off his hand to escape. In the episode "Vatos", they return to the campsite just in time to save the remaining survivors as a group of walkers overrun the camp. In the episode "Wildfire", after many losses the group leaves the unsecure campsite and travels to the Centers for Disease Control (CDC) in the hope of finding a cure. In the season finale, "TS-19", the group is hoping for a new home, but unfortunately finds no answers at the CDC. The last remaining employee, a medical doctor and researcher named Edwin Jenner (Noah Emmerich), reveals that the building will soon self-destruct, and whispers something in Rick's ear before the group escapes the doomed facility.

===== Season 2 =====
In the season premiere, "What Lies Ahead", Carl is accidentally shot during the group's search for Sophia Peletier (Madison Lintz), Carol's (Melissa McBride) daughter, who was chased away by walkers during the group's escape from Atlanta. In the episode "Bloodletting", the shooter, Otis, takes them to the isolated farm of Hershel Greene (Scott Wilson), a veterinarian who saves Carl's life. In the episode "Secrets", Lori tells Rick that she is pregnant and reveals that she and Shane had been together after she believed he died. In the mid-season finale, "Pretty Much Dead Already", the group discovers that Hershel has kept walkers in the barn, including his family, believing that he can save them. Despite Rick's objections, Shane opens the barn and kills the walkers inside, until one is revealed to be Sophia. Left with no other choice, Rick shoots the reanimated Sophia. In the mid-season premiere, "Nebraska", Rick is forced to kill two men in a bar to protect the group, but takes one of their group members, Randall Culver (Michael Zegen), as a prisoner in the episode "Triggerfinger". In the episode "Better Angels", Rick decides to keep Randall alive and the group is split on whether to free or execute him. Shane ultimately kills Randall, and then tries to kill Rick, who stabs him in the heart in self-defense. Shane comes back as a walker, but Carl kills him. In the season finale, "Beside the Dying Fire", a walker horde overruns the farm. Rick reveals to the escaped group that Jenner told him that everyone is infected. He tells Lori he killed Shane to protect himself as well as the group, but she recoils from him, horrified. Rick then coldly declares that anyone is free to leave, but affirms he is in charge and the group is no longer a democracy.

===== Season 3 =====
In the season premiere, "Seed", eight months have passed since the farm fell. Rick and Lori's relationship has further deteriorated. The group finds a prison; Rick decides they will clear it of walkers and settle it. Hershel is bit by a walker and Rick uses an axe to amputate his leg. The group then encounters surviving prisoners, who try to kill Rick and then unleash walkers into the facility, causing Lori's death. Rick falls into a downward spiral and begins hallucinating, imagining a series of phone calls and seeing visions of Lori. Rick soon comes into conflict with The Governor (David Morrissey), the leader of a small survivor town called Woodbury. Michonne (Danai Gurira), a mysterious katana-wielding survivor, arrives at the prison to reveal Glenn and Maggie Greene (Lauren Cohan) have been kidnapped by The Governor. Rick follows Michonne in the episode "Made to Suffer"; he rescues the couple by killing several soldiers and consequently causes a firefight in the streets. In retaliation, The Governor launches an assault on the prison in the episode "Home". A former member of Rick's group, Andrea (Laurie Holden), now The Governor's lover, unsuccessfully tries to negotiate peace terms between Rick and The Governor in the episodes "I Ain't a Judas" and "Arrow on the Doorpost". In the episode "Clear", Rick and Michonne journey to retrieve guns after the assault, where they find Morgan, who has lost his son and is now mentally unbalanced. Rick considers giving Michonne over to The Governor in the episode "This Sorrowful Life", asking Merle, The Governor's former ally, for assistance. Rick, unable to go through with it, calls the plan off. However, having anticipated this, Merle already abducted Michonne, but ultimately releases her before facing The Governor alone and is killed. In the season finale, "Welcome to the Tombs", Rick, Daryl and Michonne confront The Governor after he fails to take the prison and massacres his own troops. They discover a walker-bitten Andrea in The Governor's torture chamber. Rick reaffirms her as a member of his group before she uses his revolver to commit suicide. Rick brings the surviving residents of Woodbury—including Tyreese (Chad L. Coleman) and his sister, Sasha (Sonequa Martin-Green)—to the prison. He also confiscates Carl's pistol after hearing that his son killed an unarmed boy from Woodbury whom he believed to be a threat. Rick stops seeing visions of Lori.

===== Season 4 =====
In the season premiere, "30 Days Without an Accident", having relinquished leadership to a council, Rick tries to live a peaceful life as a farmer, growing crops and raising livestock for the growing prison community. However, in the episode "Infected", block D is attacked by walkers and Rick and Carl respond. They learn a mystery illness was caused by Rick's domestic pigs; it is spreading across the community and proving fatal for some. Shortly after, a crowd of walkers nearly tear down the prison fences, but Rick sacrifices the pigs to lure the walkers away. In the episode "Isolation", Carol admits that she killed two infected people to protect the others, so Rick exiles her. In the episode "Internment", Rick resolves the problems with walkers breaking through the fences, as the illness ends with Hershel's assistance. In the mid-season finale, "Too Far Gone", The Governor returns with a militia to take over the prison. Despite Rick's offer for peace, The Governor decapitates Hershel. The Governor's men then drive a tank through the prison fences, and a battle between the two sides ensues. The Governor tries to strangle a badly wounded Rick to death, but Michonne stabs him through the chest. Rick discovers Judith's empty cradle and believes that she has been killed by walkers; heartbroken, he escapes with Carl. After reuniting with Michonne in the episode "Claimed", Rick escapes from a dangerous group called the Claimers, before travelling towards Terminus, a supposed sanctuary. In the season finale, "A", Rick re-encounters the Claimers, who try to rape Carl and kill him and his friends. An enraged Rick kills their leader Joe (Jeff Kober), by biting him in the neck, as Michonne and the reunited Daryl (who had joined the Claimers), kill the remaining men. The four head to Terminus, but become suspicious as they discover the inhabitants wearing the clothes belonging to their former prison community members. The citizens of Terminus trap the group in a boxcar, where they find Glenn, Maggie, Sasha and Bob Stookey (Lawrence Gilliard Jr.) and new allies: Tara Chambler (Alanna Masterson), Abraham Ford (Michael Cudlitz), Eugene Porter (Josh McDermitt), and Rosita Espinosa (Christian Serratos).

===== Season 5 =====
In the season premiere, "No Sanctuary", Rick's group escapes Terminus as an explosion set off by Carol destroys the compound and infests it with walkers. He reunites with his daughter, Judith and graciously thanks Carol, who resettles into the group. In the episode "Strangers", the group meets Father Gabriel Stokes (Seth Gilliam) who brings them to his church to stay before going to Washington, DC in hopes of a cure. In the episode "Four Walls and a Roof", Gareth and five other Terminus survivors hunt down the group, capture a bitten Bob, eat his leg and leave him as bait, before the group lure them into the church to be trapped and slaughtered. In the episode "Crossed", a rescue mission in Atlanta for Beth Greene (Emily Kinney) ensues as Daryl informs the others of her whereabouts at Grady Memorial Hospital with escapee, Noah (Tyler James Williams). A rather peaceful resolution is ultimately decided with a hostage exchange, as the group captures several police officers for the exchange. In the mid-season finale, "Coda", leading officer Dawn Lerner (Christine Woods) demands Noah back as her ward after Beth's departure, fuelling Beth to try to kill her but she is reflexively shot in the head. Dawn is immediately killed by Daryl and a stand-off is defused by Officer Shepherd. In the mid-season premiere, "What Happened and What's Going On", Rick's group travels to Virginia where Noah's community is and eventually strive for Washington despite the cure being outed as false, in hopes of finding a safe haven, but suffer one more loss with Tyreese. In the episode "The Distance", the mournful group is encountered by a stranger named Aaron (Ross Marquand), claiming to be a recruiter for a community named Alexandria. While distrustful, they follow him as well as his boyfriend, Eric and discover he is telling the truth. In the episode "Remember", Deanna Monroe (Tovah Feldshuh), a former congresswoman from Ohio and leader of Alexandria interviews the group and assigns Rick as a constable in the community along with Michonne. In the episode "Try", Rick has a confrontation with Jessie's abusive husband Pete (Cory Brill), forcing Michonne to knock him unconscious. In the season finale, "Conquer", Deanna holds a meeting to potentially exile Rick, but Rick proves he is trying to ensure the community's protection from the living and the dead, before Pete shows up and tries to assassinate Rick with Michonne's katana, accidentally killing Deanna's husband in the process. With Deanna's approval, Rick shoots Pete in public as Morgan Jones arrives at the scene.

===== Season 6 =====
In the season premiere, "First Time Again", while getting reacquainted with Morgan, Rick discovers a quarry filled with hundreds of walkers held in by a barricade that is about to fail. He takes de facto command of Alexandria with Deanna's approval and recruits the native Alexandrians to help lure the herd away. In "Thank You", Rick and the rest of the groups follow the horn of the truck hurriedly and it separates of Glenn and Michonne, but when it tries to drive its vehicle it is attacked by a group of wolves to which Morgan let them go ahead but Rick he manages to knock down all the wolves that tried to kill him, while trying to restart the RV to go home, he discovers that the engine had been turned off, thanks to a shot fired by the blond wolf. Each failed attempt to light the RV sends Rick into a state of increasing panic, before he hears the pack's moans as they emerge from the forest beside him. The plan goes awry at several points and Rick returns to Alexandria pursued by half of the herd in the episode "Now". Deanna realizes she is no longer fit to lead the community, and officially makes Rick leader of Alexandria. The next morning ["Heads Up"], Rick continues guarding the premises of Alexandria to ensure that their situation was not compromised, and Rick also meets with Morgan to reproach him for letting the wolves escape, which had frustrated Rick's plan to drive away the walkers. Despite having received leadership of the community, Rick continues to believe that the Alexandrians are not ready to survive in the new world. This reason leads him to scold Tara when she risks her life to save Spencer, since he felt that the effort was not worth it. Later, while looking at the balloons that Glenn and Enid had released in the sky as a sign that they were still alive, Rick and all the residents of the community witness how the watchtower that was outside Alexandria collapse on the walls, allowing the entry of the horde of walkers. In the mid-season finale, "Start to Finish", the herd breaches Alexandria's walls and Rick takes shelter with Carl, Michonne, Gabriel, Deanna, Jessie, and her sons Ron and Sam in Jessie's house. Deanna is revealed to have been bitten and asks Rick to look out for the native Alexandrians as he does his own pre-Alexandria group before she dies. Rick prepares ponchos covered in walker innards for the group to sneak through the herd to safety.

Sam suffers a mental breakdown in the mid-season premiere "No Way Out". Sam is killed, followed by his mother, and Ron shoots Carl in the eye before being killed by Michonne. While Dr. Denise Cloyd treats Carl, an enraged Rick leads nearly all of Alexandria in battling and defeating the herd. Rick tells a comatose Carl that he now has hope for the future again and plans to rebuild the town, two months later, in the episode "The Next World", Rick and Daryl meet Paul "Jesus" Rovia on a supply run and after take him back to Alexandria. He later begins a relationship with Michonne. In the episode "Knots Untie", Jesus takes Rick to the Hilltop Colony, and when he learns they live in fear of Negan and his Saviors, offers to assassinate him in exchange for a trade of supplies. After a successful raid on the Saviors in the episode "Not Tomorrow Yet", Rick believes the threat of the Saviors to have been vanquished, only to be proven wrong when Denise is killed in the episode "Twice as Far". Rick makes preparations for an attack from the Saviors in the episode "East", but in the season finale, "Last Day on Earth", when Maggie has complications in her pregnancy, leads a team to seek Dr. Carson's aid at Hilltop. The group is herded into a trap by the Saviors, and Rick watches helplessly as Negan (Jeffrey Dean Morgan) kills two (unseen) members of the group.

===== Season 7 =====
In the season premiere, "The Day Will Come When You Won't Be", it is revealed that Negan's two victims were Abraham and Glenn. Negan torments Rick, saying that their deaths were his fault for crossing the Saviors, and threatens to kill them all unless Rick submits. In "Service", Rick is forced to abide by Negan's rules and the opposition of Spencer, whom he threatens. In "Go Getters", Rick plans an expedition to go find more supplies, knowing that the saviors will return for more offerings and Aaron offers to accompany him. Carl looks at his father reluctantly to see him too submissive to Negan's orders and began to treat him with indifference, rejecting even his offer to accompany him on the way out. Michonne gave him an intense kiss goodbye as a sign of support. In "Hearts Still Beating", Rick and Aaron return from a supply run to Negan killing Spencer. Negan explains that Spencer asked him to kill Rick so he could take over. With some prodding from Michonne, Rick agrees to stand up and fight, and goes to the Hilltop.

In "Rock in the Road", Rick attempts to gather an army to fight Negan; when Rick fails to rally enough people in Hilltop, Jesus brings them to a community known as the Kingdom. There, Rick meets with their leader King Ezekiel (Khary Payton), who decides not to fight. Rick and the group are able to procure wired explosives left by the Saviors. Later, Rick and the others are surrounded by a new junkyard group. In "New Best Friends", Rick negotiates with the leader Jadis (Pollyanna McIntosh), and she agrees on one-third of supplies once the war is over, but they need a large quantity of guns to make a formal alliance. In "Say Yes", Rick and Michonne look for guns. They bond, have sex, and have a deep conversation about whether he will die in the war, asking her to take over if he does. Jadis is dissatisfied with their offering, but Rick manages to convince her to let them keep some of the guns while they find more.

In "Something They Need", Tara leads Rick to Oceanside where they have guns, having kept it a secret. They huddle the community at gunpoint, but promise they will return them later. They fail to convince Oceanside to fight, however. In "The First Day of the Rest of Your Life", Negan's former lieutenant Dwight (Austin Amelio) offers to help Rick and delays Negan's imminent arrival, while Rick brings Jadis and the Scavengers to Alexandria to prepare for an attack. It backfires when it is revealed Jadis was already working with Negan. Negan threatens to kill Sasha, and Rick asks to see her. Sasha, having committed suicide to prevent herself from being used as bait, reanimates as a walker and attacks Negan, buying the Alexandrians a chance to open fire against the Scavengers and Saviors. Rick is shot by Jadis after he tries to re-negotiate, and later soldiers from the Kingdom and the Hilltop arrive to save the day. This prompts Negan to retreat. The episode and season ends with Rick, Maggie and Ezekiel uniting the three communities together.

===== Season 8 =====
In the season premiere, "Mercy", Rick stands before the assembled forces of the Kingdom, Alexandria and the Hilltop and declares the world to be theirs. He leads a large convoy of survivors with armored vehicles to the Sanctuary to confront the Saviors. Rick offers the Saviors the chance to surrender, but states that Negan has to die. The group then opens fire, ravaging the Sanctuary before a massive herd of walkers (led by Daryl) arrives. Rick uses an explosive-laden RV to blow open the gates. As walkers flood into the Sanctuary, Rick spots Negan taking cover and attempts to shoot him, but Gabriel stops him.

In the episode "The Damned", Rick and Daryl lead a group of survivors to take control of a Savior compound with the added goal of capturing a stash of guns housed inside. Rick finds where he believes them to be housed, but only gains access after killing a Savior in a brutal fight. He opens the door to find a nursery with a baby inside, forcing Rick to question the morality of his plan. This is compounded when he is confronted by former Atlanta survivor Morales (Juan Pareja), now a Savior, who informs him that reinforcements are on the way. "Monsters" opens with Rick talking to Morales, trying to convince him of Negan's evil to no effect. Their conversation is cut short when Daryl kills Morales from behind, despite Rick's protests. He is further disturbed when Daryl executes a Savior who Rick had promised to let go in exchange for information.

In "Some Guy", Rick and Daryl chase two Saviors while they make a hasty pursuit with weapons on their backs. One of the Saviors begins to shoot at them, forcing Daryl to deviate from the road. Rick stays in his way. One of the Saviors, Iago, evades the walkers on the road, pulling the other Savior's target and causing him to stumble. When he regains his position and continues shooting at the other truck, Rick veers off to the side, allowing Daryl to open fire on the Savior. Rick manages to reach Iago's truck and jumps on board, stabs Iago in the stomach and pushes him out of the vehicle before crashing into the side of the road. He and Daryl then find a cache of 50-calibre machine guns.

In "The Big Scary U", Rick and Daryl learn from a dying Iago that everyone in the Kingdom died except Ezekiel, Jerry and Carol. They enter into a discussion about what to do with the weapons; Daryl believes that they should use them against the Saviors, while Rick sees a more humane solution. The argument turns into a fist fight, which inadvertently results in a dynamite bag thrown at the truck, destroying it along with the weapons. Daryl heads back to Alexandria, and a resentful Rick heads off to another course.

In "The King, the Widow, and Rick", Rick, Maggie and Carol organize the next assault on the Saviors. Rick travels to the Scavenger base to meet Jadis, and offers to ally with them against the Saviors. Jadis refuses, however, and takes Rick captive. In the episode "Time for After", Rick tries to negotiate his release with Jadis, but she refuses again, and threatens to feed him to a walker. Rick manages to overpower Jadis, and she lets him go. Rick then makes a deal to allow the scavengers to share the Saviors' supplies if they join him. Jadis demands to see the situation in the Sanctuary before she or her people commit to Rick's plan. Rick guides them to the outer perimeter of the enclosure; upon entering, Rick finds one of his snipers dead, being devoured by walkers. Unable to eliminate the other snipers, Rick climbs a tower and watches the area from a higher ground, and escapes.

In the mid-season finale, "How It's Gotta Be", Rick marches with the Scavengers to the Sanctuary, but they are ambushed and the Scavengers flee, leaving Rick behind. Carol and Jerry rescue him, and the three decide to separate. Later in the night, Rick finds that the Saviors have set Alexandria on fire, which forces him to again confront Negan. After a brief struggle, Rick escapes with Michonne into the sewers, where the rest of their people are hiding, along with Siddiq, who was rescued by Carl. Rick then discovers, to his horror, that Carl has been bitten by a walker.

In the mid-season premiere, "Honor", Rick and Michonne organize an escape plan with the others, while the Saviors bomb Alexandria. As he lays dying, Carl gives Rick a letter in which he urges his father to make peace with Negan. Unable to watch his son die, a devastated Rick turns away as Carl commits suicide. As Rick mourns Carl's death, he contemplates making his son's vision of a peaceful future a reality.

In the season finale, "Wrath", Rick's group and the Saviors face off for a final battle. Rick cuts Negan's throat, but, inspired by Carl's last wishes, allows him to live, imprisoning him instead.

===== Season 9 =====
Rick begins the season as the de facto leader of all of the communities, with Maggie in charge of Hilltop, Daryl in charge of the Saviors, and Ezekiel in charge of the Kingdom. Rick strives for prosperity and cooperation among the communities, assuring the future that Carl had wished for. His choice to spare Negan has cost him his relationship with Maggie and Daryl, who both want Negan dead. Tensions rise between the groups to a small insurrection, led by a group of Saviors who oppose Rick's rule. This causes an even further rift between the communities, and ideologies clash as Maggie and Daryl begin to oppose Rick's leadership and vision of cooperation.

Rick learns that Maggie is going to kill Negan, and rides with Daryl to try and stop her; this results in a fight between the two in which they fall into a chasm, and have to fight their way out to avoid being swarmed by two incoming herds of walkers. Rick tries to salvage the bridge between the two communities, he is thrown from his horse and impaled on a rebar pipe. Crying in agony, Rick is left on the side of the road while he passes out, as hundreds of walkers approach him.

Seriously injured, Rick manages to free himself from the rebar and leads the herd away using his horse, haunted by hallucinations of his dead friends. Finding the camp overrun, Rick leads the massive combined herd onto the bridge, which he believes would collapse under the weight of the herd, but it holds. With his friends desperately trying to save him, Rick shoots fallen dynamite, blowing the bridge up and apparently killing himself in the process. Unknown to anyone, Rick survives the explosion and is found by Anne (Jadis) on the riverbank. Anne convinces her allies (the Civic Republic Military, CRM) who are in the helicopter to take Rick to safety and treat his injuries. Rick later awakens on the helicopter with Anne, who assures him that he is being taken to a safe place.

Six years after Rick's apparent death, Michonne has taken over Alexandria and still visits the destroyed bridge where Rick was last seen alive and talks to him. A nine-year old Judith has inherited Rick's revolver and sheriff's hat, but admits that she is starting to forget both Rick and Carl's voices. Michonne has also given birth to Rick's son, Rick "R.J" Grimes Jr. It's revealed that Michonne found Rick's gun on the riverbank while searching for him and that Daryl spent years searching for his friend's body without any success.

===== Season 10 =====
Years after Rick's disappearance, Michonne finds his boots on Bloodsworth Island while helping out a survivor named Virgil. Virgil reveals that the boots washed up on the island in an abandoned boat and Michonne finds an old iPhone with Rick's name on it and a drawing of herself and Judith scratched into the phone. Realizing that Rick is still alive out there somewhere, Michonne decides to depart the communities in order to search for him, finding a possible clue in the boat's logs to his location.

===== Season 11 =====
In the series finale, Judith reveals to Daryl and Carol the truth about Michonne's departure in search of Rick who is still alive. A year later, Daryl departs to "be out there" and also locate his friends.

On Rat Island, Rick, wearing an Alliance of the Three jacket, writes a message to Michonne that he throws into the water. Moments later, he is found by a CRM helicopter and tosses his belongings aboard the boat where they would eventually be found by Virgil and Michonne. The pilot, referring to Rick as Consignee Grimes, orders Rick to surrender, telling him that there's no escape for the living. Enraged, Rick drives a kill stick through the head of a walker buried in the mud and reluctantly surrenders. In The Walking Dead: The Ones Who Live, this is revealed to have been a flashback to Rick's third escape attempt and it occurred sometime within the first five years after Rick's departure in "What Comes After."

==== Fear the Walking Dead ====
Rick also appears in the fourth season premiere of the companion series Fear the Walking Dead with his appearance chronologically following the events of The Walking Dead season 8 finale. In the episode, Rick tries to convince Morgan Jones to come back with him before Morgan ultimately decides to go off on his own.

Rick also appears in flashbacks in the eighth season and is mentioned by Morgan several times, particularly after Morgan returns to Rick's hometown of King County, Georgia where the two men first met in order to put down his zombified son Duane. With the encouragement of his girlfriend Grace, Morgan is finally able to bring himself to shoot Duane using the rifle that Rick had given him when the two men had first parted ways in the attic of the house that Morgan and Rick had first met in. After finally making peace with himself, Morgan departs for Alexandria, intending to find Rick once again. Morgan makes an open broadcast to Rick, declaring his intention to find him again no matter where Rick is and promising to leave the radio open for a few minutes at dawn every day, echoing Morgan and Rick's promise to each other the first time that they parted ways.

==== The Walking Dead: World Beyond ====
Jadis reappears in season 2 of The Walking Dead: World Beyond, although there is no sign of Rick. Six years have passed since their departure from Virginia and the only possible clue that Jadis gives to Rick's current fate is her mentioning to Huck that she had traded "something very valuable" to the CRM in order to get her new life.

In the series finale, Jadis confirms to Huck that she had in fact traded Rick for her new life in the CRM. However, Jadis reveals that she had lied about Rick being a "B" and that he was really an "A." Jadis knew that if she had told the CRM that Rick was an "A," he would've ended up as one of the CRM's test subjects and Jadis owed Rick enough to spare him from such a terrible fate. Jadis later mentions Rick to Lieutenant Colonel Elizabeth Kublek, calling Rick the strongest man she ever knew. Jadis admits that she took advantage of the moment that Rick became entirely vulnerable and used it to her advantage.

==== The Walking Dead: The Ones Who Live ====
Five years after his departure in "What Comes After," Rick has become a consignee at the Civic Republic Military, based in Philadelphia, which has become a secret city whose occupants are not allowed to leave. Consignees must perform tasks to earn their citizenship in the CRM, but Rick has attempted escape 4 times, even cutting off his own left hand. Despite his attempts to escape, Lieutenant Colonel Donald Okafor still pushes him to join the CRM as a soldier. He laments after speaking with his friend, fellow Consignee Esteban, who was recently allowed citizenship as a water manager.

Rick joins the military and receives a prosthetic hand. Later, Okafor takes him and a fellow soldier, Pearl Thorne, to a private meeting in which he discusses his intentions for the CRM to change. Okafor also reveals that Rick and Thorne are classified as A's because they are both leaders willing to die for their causes, unlike B's who are ordinary people just trying to survive. Rick and Thorne had only been allowed to live once the CRM realized this because of Okafor's intervention. He tells them he wants them to rise through the ranks to the point they will be eligible for the Echelon briefing, a series of secrets only a select few in the military know and none of the city does. Rick initially doesn't intend to help with this, but Thorne, believing there is no escape from the CRM, does and threatens to shoot Rick if he attempts further escapes. Rick meets with Major General Beale, who tells him of the Alliance of the Three comprising Philadelphia, Omaha, and Portland, the latter two not knowing of the Civic Republic's existence. He explains that the CRM was originally the Pennsylvania National Guard and fought against the military when they attempted to bomb the city at the start of the outbreak. Okafor was one of the bombers, but defected and instead killed a base of 4,000 soldiers preparing to liquidate any survivors. He asks Rick if Okafor is planning something, although Rick lies that he isn't.

Later, during a mission at a chemical plant, Rick tries to escape only to encounter a little girl among the walkers, all of whom are killed by him and Thorne, who reveals that Okafor knows about Rick's family. Rick confronts him, who confirms he had found the letters he attempted to send to Michonne during his third attempt. A fight ensues, during which Okafor reveals his wife was among those killed during his bombing of the soldiers. He sends Rick and Thorne on an assignment to convert a college to a CRM base. At his apartment, Thorne shows him a news report of Omaha's destruction, stating that the CRM's secrecy keeps them safe, and it is all they have left; he considers suicide, but decides to fully commit to the CRM and burns his letters for Michonne.

In the present day, Rick and Okafor pilot a helicopter, and Rick announces his intention to help him change the CRM; however, their helicopter is attacked, and Okafor is killed. A woman begins executing soldiers, and after finding Rick, she pulls off her helmet revealing herself to be Michonne.

The CRM arrive, and Rick warns Michonne to create a cover story presenting her as weaker than she is in order to save being killed, her friend Nat is killed by a surviving CRM Frontliner, and Rick places her sword in his hand. As a helicopter arrives, Rick tells her to think of a new name for the dead other than ‘walkers’ as that's the same name he uses and would arouse suspicion. Michonne becomes a consignee and Rick promises the two of them will escape, but he refuses to fight back. Back at his apartment, Rick requests that Thorne vouch for Michonne, which she does. Hours later, Jadis arrives. She tells him she will kill all those in Alexandria if he attempts to leave with her, before asking what he is doing.

Jadis tells Rick that she placed a file among her possessions detailing Alexandria, and if she dies, the CRM will find it and destroy Alexandria hours later. Rick and Thorne meet with Beale, who gives Rick a martial arts book he gave to Okafor and promotes Thorne. After receiving the Echelon Briefing, she becomes more committed than ever to the CRM. Rick organizes an escape for Michonne involving a red canoe, and disguising a walker as a consignee, he leaves a note stating that he is not coming and if she loves him, she will go. He asks that Jadis help cover up Michonne's escape, but immediately discovers she has remained. He tells her that the only reason he was allowed to live despite his escape attempts was because of Okafor, and that the only way Michonne will be able to escape is if Rick remains and makes sure she lives.

While exploring a park in the city, Michonne finds an artist named Benjiro who uses old TVs and iPhones as his canvases and realizes that he was the one who had created the engraved iPhone that Michonne had found, which led her to discover Rick's survival. Recognizing Michonne, Benjiro explains that Rick would come several times a year for a new portrait of his family to help him remember them. However, Benjiro could never get Carl quite right for Rick. This gives Michonne renewed hope that Rick hasn't been taken in by the promise that the Civic Republic represents.

Thorne, suspicious of Michonne, brings her to the site where Okafor previously took her and Rick and questions her. Thorne secretly draws her knife which leads Rick to secretly draw his gun. Thorne decides to trust Michonne and has her accompany them on a mission to the university; however, Michonne breaks protocol and Rick helps her. Thorne aims her gun at an unsuspecting Michonne, but Rick intervenes. Thorne sends the two back home, and Rick tells Michonne to escape next time he gives her a chance. He ends their relationship in an attempt to make sure Michonne will leave. However, in the helicopter, Michonne grabs him and forces them both into the water below.

Taking shelter in a high-rise building called Greenwood that had once been home to a survivor community of innovators, the two discover that the storm had downed their helicopter, meaning that everyone will think that they're dead and Rick and Michonne can go home. However, Rick refuses to go, insisting upon finishing Okafor's work. Rick eventually reveals that his years of imprisonment have left him severely traumatized and unable to bear the thought of losing his family again if Rick allows Michonne to stay. Rick is no longer able to remember Carl's face, having lost the ability to see him in his dreams. Michonne gives Rick an iPhone that she had Benjiro engrave with Carl's picture and Rick finally agrees to return home. As Greenwood collapses following a CRM bombing to destroy any evidence of their presence, Rick and Michonne escape and take one of the community's hybrid vehicles that has enough ethanol to get them home to Alexandria.

While stopping in Yellowstone National Park for the night, Rick and Michonne are forced to fight off a group of bandits and they are found by Jadis who had deduced the couple's survival. Unable to just kill Jadis because of her dossier threatening Alexandria's safety, Rick and Michonne battle her throughout the park. Jadis reveals that, before their escape, Rick had finally earned Major General Beale's trust and Beale was going to promote him and give Rick the Echelon Briefing where he would reveal to Rick the true size and scope of the CRM's plans as well as all of their secrets. Rick agrees to return to the CRM with Jadis if Michonne can go home, but they double-cross each other and Jadis is fatally bitten by a walker in the melee. Dying, Jadis decides to go out as Anne, the artist who had lived in Alexandria and been their friend for a time rather than Jadis, the ruthless Warrant Officer of the CRM. Anne tells the couple where to find the dossier and implores them to destroy it and just go home, but Michonne states that they are going to return to the CRM so that Rick can get the Echelon Briefing and they can expose the CRM's crimes. Anne gives Rick a wedding ring that Gabriel had found for him, and Rick shoots Anne on her request. Before stealing Jadis' helicopter to fly back to Cascadia Forward Operating Base, Rick and Michonne officially exchange wedding vows using the ring.

Returning to base, Rick presents himself as the sole survivor of the helicopter crash, claiming that Michonne had pushed him out just before the helicopter went down. As Michonne uses Jadis' armor to sneak in and find and destroy the dossier, Rick is brought before Beale who is more impressed than ever by Rick, noting that Rick finally had the chance to escape after all of those years of trying, and he still came back which Beale believes to be a sign of Rick finally seeing the bigger picture. The two men discuss their pasts and Beale suggests that within the next decade, Rick himself could be the next leader of the CRM. Beale gives Rick the Echelon Briefing, noting that despite having given it more than 2,500 times, it was never to someone like Rick. Beale reveals that, according to the CRM's scientists, humanity only has around fourteen or so years left before they go extinct from a combination of the dead, starvation and disease. As a result, Beale plans to declare martial law over the Civic Republic and begin a genocidal march wiping out other communities and survivors and scavenging their resources to ensure the Civic Republic's survival, having already started with Omaha and its Campus Colony. Although Beale offers to ensure the safety of anyone that Rick cares about, Rick refuses the offer and attacks the Major General, ultimately killing Beale with his own sword.

With the CRM poised to destroy Portland the next day, Rick and Michonne rig up a makeshift bomb on the CRM's arsenal of chlorine gas, using a zombified Beale and a Frontliner that Rick was forced to kill as a makeshift fuse. Having deduced Michonne's true identity and now completely loyal to the CRM's cause, Thorne intercepts and stops them, but becomes distracted by the sight of the zombified Beale, allowing Rick and Michonne to escape. The explosion of the bomb and the released poison gas kills all of the Frontliners and the entire CRM Force Command while Michonne is forced to kill Thorne. With her last words, Thorne acknowledges that Okafor was right after all, but they just have to hope that Beale was wrong too. Escaping from the base as it's overrun with walkers, Rick and Michonne return to the Civic Republic and expose the CRM's atrocities to the civilian government who take emergency oversight of the military and reform it for the better as well as opening free travel to and from the city.

Rick and Michonne finally return home by helicopter where they are reunited with their kids in a field and Rick meets his son RJ for the first time.

=== In other media ===
Rick, alongside other The Walking Dead characters, appears in the adult comedy series Robot Chicken in the episode: "The Robot Chicken Walking Dead Special: Look Who's Walking", voiced again by Andrew Lincoln.

Rick appears as a skin in Fortnite Battle Royale, with two selectable styles based on his seasons 5 and 8 appearances. He was released alongside the survivors in arms set, alongside the Sheriff's Bag Back Bling, Walker Club Pickaxe, and Crashing Satellite Glider on October 10, 2021.

Rick is a playable character in The Walking Dead: Destinies, voiced by Ian Hanlin. He can appear as a boss fight during the final fight between him and Shane, and can be killed, changing events for the rest of the game.

Rick appears as an operator in Call of Duty: Modern Warfare III and Call of Duty: Warzone 2.0, voiced by Andrew Lincoln. He appears as part of the Season 02 content update in the Battle Pass. His appearance is based on season 5, but an alternative skin is available as part of the Black Cell feature, which gives him a gold and black color palette, a Sheriff's hat, and glowing purple eyes. His skin will also change into that of a zombie upon getting kills.

In August 2025, Rick and Michonne were added as playable survivors in Dead by Daylight. In the game, there is an unlockable character skin available for Rick, which converts him to Daryl Dixon.

== Development ==
=== Casting ===
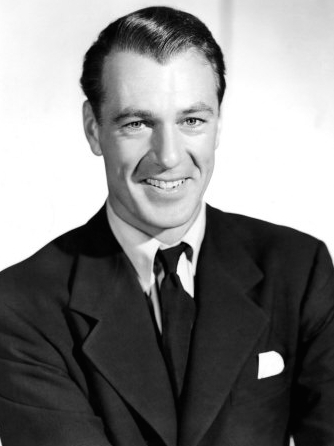
Lincoln alluded to several television shows and cinematic works in portraying Rick Grimes, including Gary Cooper's character, Will Kane, in the American western film High Noon (1952).

Rick Grimes is portrayed by Andrew Lincoln, who was cast as part of the television adaptation in April 2010. Prior to attaining the role, Lincoln had no prior knowledge of the comic book series. "I didn't even get a script the first time—I got sides, because it was so top-secret," he stated. "I was really intrigued and put myself on tape. They got back very quickly from Hollywood and gave me the script." Lincoln approached a bookstore (Mega City Comics) in the London Borough of Camden, where the owner introduced him to the comics. "That's when I went to a comic-book store in Camden, and said 'Have you heard of this comic book?'. The owner showed me this shrine they had to the comic, and said 'This is our most popular and successful comic, and in my opinion, one of the greatest graphic novels of the last ten years'. That's when I got into it."

In preparation for the role, Lincoln sought inspiration from the American drama series Breaking Bad, as well as western film High Noon (1952). Since he felt that The Walking Dead emulated western cinematic works, Lincoln found High Noon to be very useful in projecting a country-like character for Rick. The performance of Gary Cooper and the moral structure of his character was also cited as an influence; "He's a divided man, between his responsibilities and his marriage. He's not like the Clint Eastwood figure, the loner. It's more complicated than that. He's got a softer heart, so that was definitely an inspiration for me as well." Lincoln avouched that it was difficult to perfect a southern American accent. "I worked really hard on the accent," he stated. "I suppose if you're asked by one of the great channels in America to lead their show, you want to start off getting that right. I worked hard on not just the accent, but also on being American and getting into the feel of that." He traveled to Atlanta three weeks before production of the first season began, and worked with a dialect coach while there. Although weapon training was required, Lincoln had previous experience with weaponry training in the British six-part television series Strike Back (2010).

Executive producer Gale Anne Hurd initially didn't expect Lincoln to portray Grimes. Upon hearing the announcement, Writer Robert Kirkman felt that Lincoln was an "amazing find" and added that he accurately embodied the characteristics of Rick. "Writing Rick Grimes month after month in the comic series, I had no idea he was an actual living, breathing human being, and yet, here he is. I couldn't be more thrilled with how this show is coming together." Although he was initially shocked upon hearing of the concept of The Walking Dead, Lincoln thought that the script for "Days Gone Bye" was well written. He stated: "I read it and thought it was well written, and I put myself on tape just for one scene. I didn't know who was involved at this point." The following day, Lincoln's agent called him about the development of the pilot, to which Lincoln called it "kind of like a dream list".

Lincoln announced his plan to leave the show in mid-2018; he cited that due to spending at least half a year for filming in America while his family was in England, he felt it was time to end his role to spend more time with his children. Lincoln portrayed Grimes for six episodes of the ninth season prior to his departure. Lincoln said he had been talking as early as the show's fourth season about leaving the show with showrunner Scott M. Gimple, and had initially made plans to leave after season 8's conclusion. However, during the 2017 San Diego Comic-Con event, taking place during the middle of season 8's production, Lincoln realized he could not leave his fellow cast members at that point, and decided to wait and leave the next season, giving the showrunners enough screentime to set up Rick's departure from the show appropriately.

=== Characterization ===
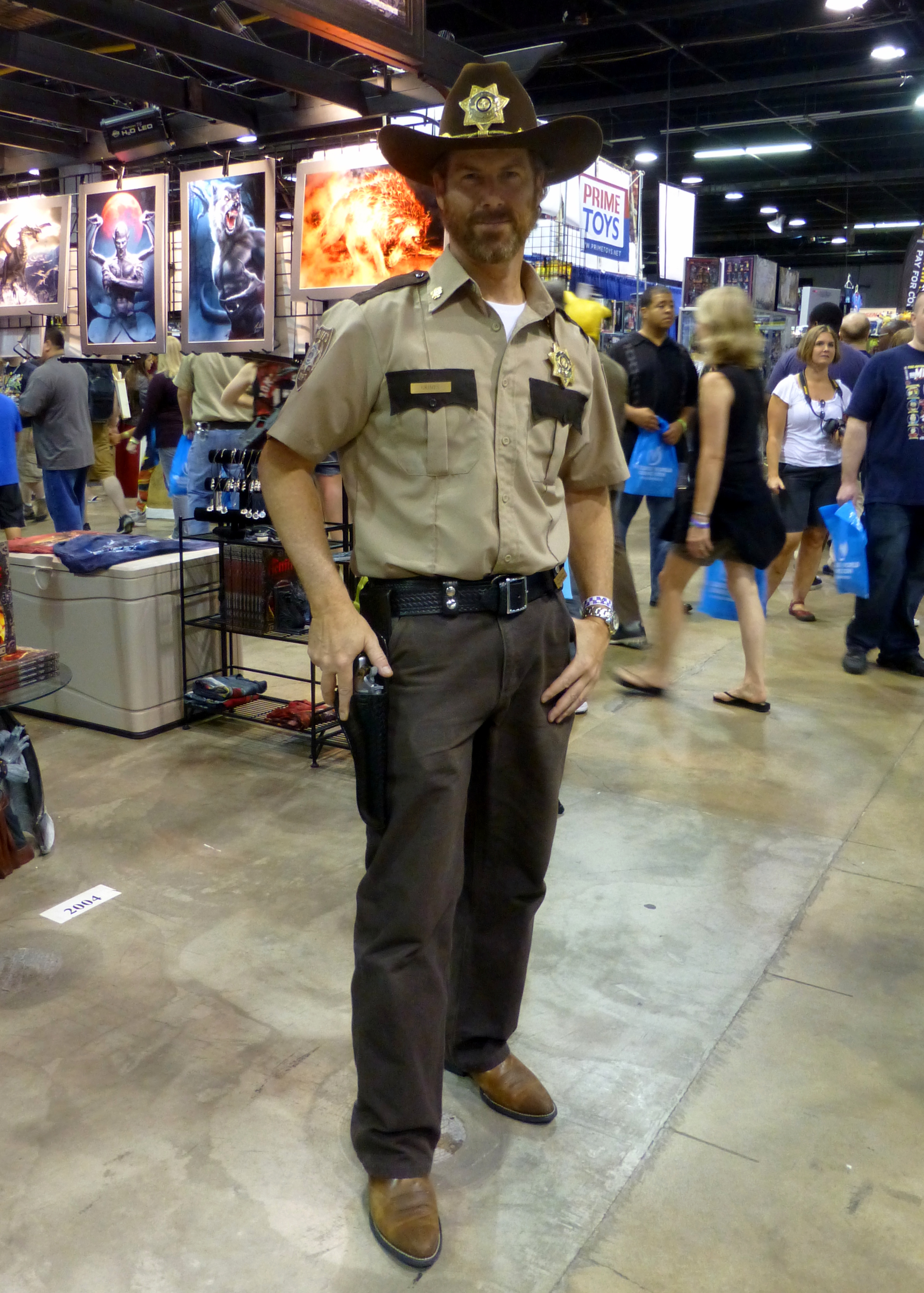
A cosplayer dressed up in Rick Grimes' police uniform at the Wizard World Chicago in 2015

Rick is a much more realistic police officer. I always kind of pictured that Rick Grimes was not a police officer that had used his gun very often. He was just one of those guys that basically just walks by the local malt shop and made sure the kids were getting home on time.

— Robert Kirkman

Rick Grimes has been described as a man that emphasizes moral standards. Lincoln summated: "His intentions are good, though his decisions may be bad many times. He's complicated and flawed, which I find fascinating because it makes him human. He sort of erodes over time because of the world he lives, and there's nothing more satisfying than playing a character that changes irrevocably, so I embrace all of that." Lincoln added that Rick was a somewhat inflexible leader, which he opined could potentially put Grimes' group in danger. Despite these assertions, he affirmed that the complexities have molded him into a decisive and peculiar character. "I also think Rick's inflexibility is both a part of his character and a reaction to what's happening around him. This situation [...] has brought qualities out in people that are both good and horrible. And certainly, as I was playing him, I felt Rick [consistently] needed to have a mission, otherwise he was just stagnating. You see this in several characters. They have to keep moving. Without a horizon, they flounder. And it was a big call for Rick to go to the CDC [...] in the fifth episode, but he was looking long-term. I find that admirable, because he's looking to the future for his family, for a cure, and for sanctity."

In both media, Rick adopts a more dark and assertive nature as the story progresses. In the comic, he is faced with dealing against a murderous sociopath that claims the life of two group members, as well as an attempted suicide indirectly provoked by his close and trusted friend. Perhaps the most significant moment, he is eventually put under physical and mental torture by The Governor as a result of vulnerability and mistaken trust, ultimately causing him to become crippled and causing the death of many within the group, including his wife and newborn child. The first hand witnessing of the savageness around him leads him to gradually adapt a more primal mindset, becoming less affected by violence and death (at times brutally murdering/mutilating people). Similarly, his perspective becomes increasingly deluded, as his decreased trust in people and decreased tolerance level leads him to take no issue in risking the life of an innocent. This is specifically shown as Rick struggles when eventually being given the chance to return to normalcy. He is however shown to be very protective of those who have suffered alongside him and most protective of his son, Carl, which leads to him being caring and considerate to them one moment and cold and detached the next. Later in the series, after his wife's death and his son suffering from amnesia after being shot, his long time friend Andrea helps him see a brighter future for the community they reside in called Alexandria and Rick begins to embrace his leadership position, as well as start a relationship with her. He then begins a trading network with other communities, which is threatened by the tyrannical Negan who is eventually subdued and imprisoned. He continues to grow and expand his community, and create safety perimeters around Washington, D.C. to travel to other communities.

As the second season of The Walking Dead progressed, Kirkman discerned that the sophomore season revolved around Rick's ability to emerge as a credible leader, proving to the group that he can adequately protect everyone in the group. He continued: "This is one more thing emerging where you see that this is a guy who can gun down people when they're a threat and can definitely handle himself when it comes to walkers but also cares about people. He's going to retain some of that humanity, and that's very important for these characters. It makes Rick stand head and shoulders above other people, like Shane, in this world." The gradual change is largely attributed to the death of Sophia Peletier, whom he shot after she had turned into a walker in "Pretty Much Dead Already". These characteristics become more prominent in "Nebraska", and again in "18 Miles Out". Robert Kirkman felt that "Nebraska" demonstrated that Rick was not delirious, as Shane accused him of being.

The end of this episode proves to Rick that that's not the case. This entire season has been leading up to the moment where he shot those two men. Shane has been beating it into his head that he isn't fit for this world and needs to be a harder man and be able to make the hard decisions. Over the last two episodes, we've seen Rick be the one that has to step up and shoot Sophia when no one else can. We've seen him in the blink of an eye take out two guys who are a clear threat to him and everyone else that's with him. This is really the beginning of Rick emerging as a clear leader and answering that thing that Shane's been saying all this time.

After the death of his wife in the television series, Rick faces a downward spiral to the point of relinquishing his leadership position in the prison community by the end of the third season. At the beginning of the fourth season, Lincoln described Rick as a man "repressing his brutality for the sake of his son". However, at the end of the fourth season after losing the prison and suffering more losses, he described Rick as "a man accepting brutality for the sake of his son", following closely to the comic in which he bites the throat of a marauder who threatens to assassinate him and assault his son. He further assessed that "Rick is a man who has made peace with the brutality within him that's inherent in him along with the moral sense that is just as valid a part of him. Rick is psychologically the strongest he's ever been. Because he's realized that the only way to stay alive – to keep his son alive in this new world – is by actively embracing all sides of his personality including darkness, fury and rage."

In the fifth season, Lincoln asserted that "Rick is [...] at the most complete place he's been ever since the apocalypse started. He's a man who doesn't doubt himself anymore, and he's accepted his brutality as much as his humanity. So I think he's in an incredibly powerful and dangerous place." He also described him as being a leader once again, who is much more uncompromising as he "[drags] a lot of [the group] into a place that is darker, more brutal." Entertainment Weekly assessed that "This is the Rick viewers most assuredly need after watching him mope around on-and-off for two seasons after having every bad thing in the world happen to him. And it's the Rick that the rest of the survivors need as well if they are going to continue to keep on keeping on."

== Reception ==
=== Critical reception ===
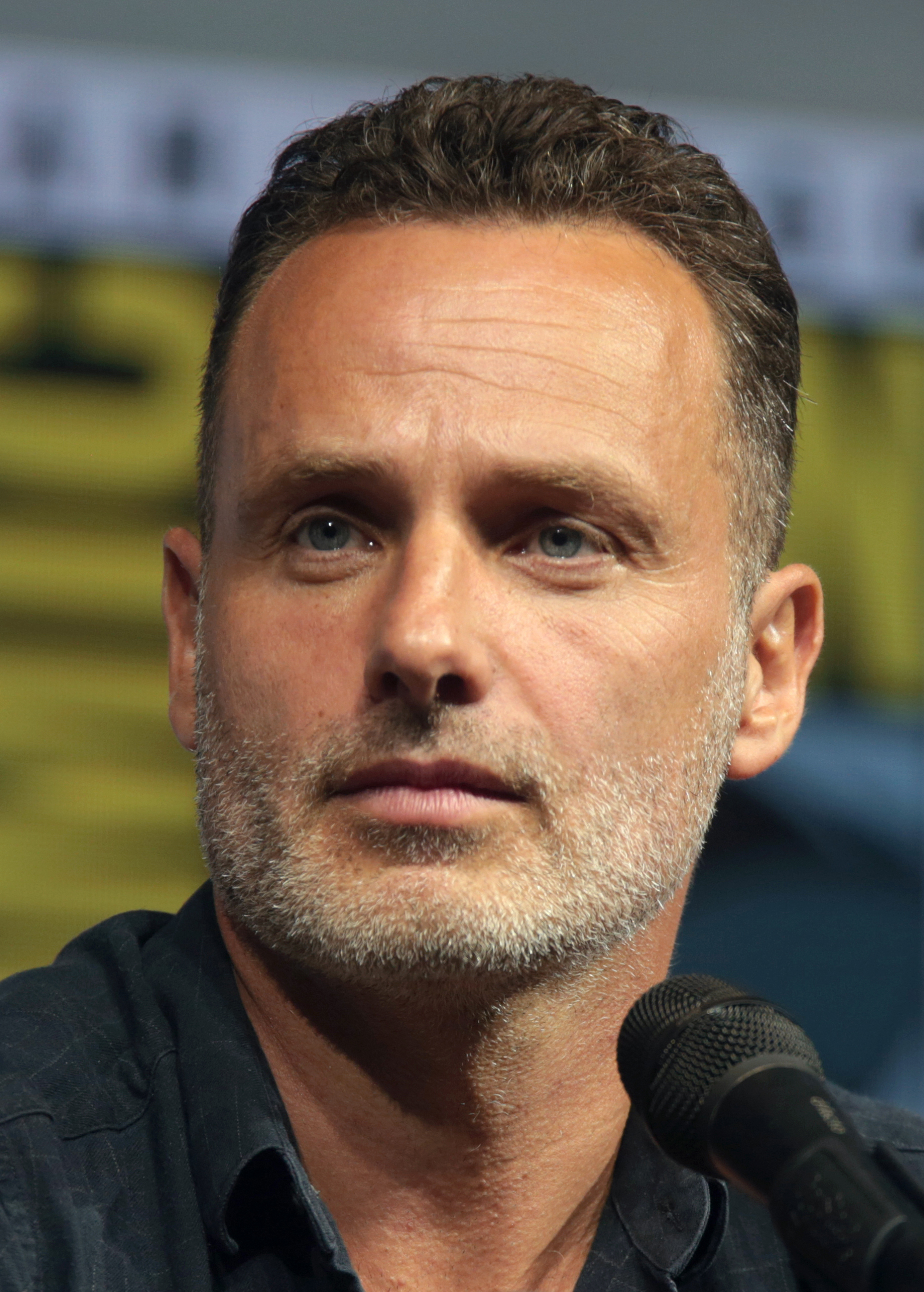
Andrew Lincoln's portrayal of Rick Grimes has been lauded by critics and audiences

Rick Grimes was named the 26th Top Comic Book Hero by IGN, and Lincoln's portrayal of Rick has been generally well received by television commentators and audiences. He was nominated for a Saturn Award in the category for Best Actor in Television. IGN's Eric Goldman stated that Lincoln fit into character very well; "For much of the pilot, he's on his own and exudes a lot of believable, shocked emotion, as Rick tries to process what he is seeing." Although he cited that his accent was "dodgy" in the pilot installment, Leonard Pierce of The A.V. Club observed that Lincoln became more relaxed as the series progressed. "His body language and expression here is totally different now than when we saw him before. He's a fast learner."

As the second season commenced, critics became keen to the character development of Grimes in several episodes, particularly in "Nebraska". Reviewing the episode, Los Angeles Times' Gina McIntyre felt that Rick emulated Justified character Raylan Givens, while Zach Handlen of The A.V. Club observed that Rick was morphing into "something of a badass." Handlen added that it marked a turning point for Grimes, which established his position "as a guy who can do what needs to be done." Scott Meslow of The Atlantic commented that "there's the surprisingly swift, violent dénouement, when Rick guns down Dave and Tony before they can do the same to him. It's a necessary action, given the circumstances, but it also rings in an honest-to-god character change for our hero, who, having dispatched zombie Sophia, seems to have developed a new recognition of the ruthlessness and self-centeredness it may take to survive in this new world order."

The growing tensions between Rick and Shane Walsh have been well received by television critics. In a review for "Bloodletting", Joe Oesterle of Mania.com commended the performances of Lincoln and Bernthal. Oesterle wrote, "Andrew Lincoln and Jon Bernthal [...] gave a fine bit of acting, and I found it interesting how the character Rick started looking and walking a little bit zombish after giving blood. The scenes between the two men were moving, and if you listened close you could decipher the main differences between these two cowboy cops. Rick is bound and determined to get back to his wife and let her know their son is in mortal danger, without ever doubting his own ability to successfully complete the mission, while Shane on the other hand is not quite as automatically selfless and heroic."

Several critics lauded Grimes' interactions with Walsh in "18 Miles Out". Writing for CNN, Henry Hanks said that "Rick made it clear to Shane that he had to respect his rules from now on." Alex Crumb of The Faster Times evaluated their physical confrontation as "wholly satisfying", while Entertainment Weekly writer Darren Franich appreciated the fight scene involving Grimes and Walsh; "The Shane/Rick fight was great, a brilliantly extended scuffle that started out with an air of boys-will-be-boys pettiness but quickly escalated into something genuinely homicidal." Berriman of SFX summated: "It's shocking when Shane hurls a wrench at Rick's head, but even more shocking that Rick is prepared to cut and run and leave him for dead. Rick's change of heart when he looks down at the two dead walkers on the floor and is reminded of the friendship between himself and his former partner is a beautifully played moment, which speaks volumes without a single line of dialogue being uttered. The fact that, come the end, he's willing to trust Shane again after all that has gone on between them is genuinely touching."

By the start of season three, Rick's character arc developed him into a more world-weary, cynical, ruthless, and hardened person. Erik Kain of Forbes said that Rick started out as "the voice of reason, a calm presence, and an earnest leader" in the first two seasons, but had developed into an "anti-hero" by season three. Tom Ward of Esquire noted that Rick was almost a completely different man by the end of the fifth season: "He may resemble the clean-cut law enforcer from the first season, but inside, 'stuff' and 'things' have changed the man with the highest zombie kill count in history...Has Rick become the show's villain? After Rick and his group slaughtered the members of Terminus, Andrew Lincoln voiced that "[i]n Seasons 1, 2, and 3, and half of 4, Rick was a man either restraining or denying a brutal part of his personality, in order that his children grow up and, hopefully, have a father that was morally sound. A father who could give a good value system to his children. The difference in [Season five] is that there is no safe haven."

In the seventh season, Zack Handlen for The A.V. Club was critical of the morality of Rick and Tara raiding Oceanside. He assessed, "...we are forcibly reminded of The Walking Dead's greatest weakness: Rick Must Always Be Right (except when he's trying to fight against his destiny as a leader). The people of Oceanside almost immediately lose what little distinctive identity they once had, falling in line like they were just waiting for some bearded dude to show up and start ordering them around, and there's no acknowledgement of the weirdness of this, of how close Rick's tactics are to the very man he's trying to destroy".

Noel Murray of Rolling Stone ranked Rick Grimes 5th in a list of 30 best Walking Dead characters, saying, "while former sheriff Rick Grimes has had plenty of stretches where he's been overwhelmed by his emotions or has made outright idiotic decisions, he's ultimately remained the compelling, charismatic character that he was when we first met him. He represents The Walking Dead's conflicted core, the conduit that writers use to explore both the hard choices a successful survivalist has to make and what it costs people when they become unfazed by death."

=== Awards and nominations ===
Accolades
Wins	IGN Summer Movie Award for Best TV Hero (2010); Satellite Award for Best Cast – Television Series (2012); People's Choice Award for Favorite TV Anti-Hero (2014); Saturn Award for Best Actor on Television (2015, 2017)
Nominations	Saturn Award for Best Actor on Television (2011, 2013, 2016, 2018–2019); Scream Award for Best Horror Actor (2011); Gold Derby TV Award for Best Drama Actor (2012); EWwy Award for Best Actor, Drama (2012, 2015–2016); Critics' Choice Television Award for Best Actor in a Drama Series (2013); TV Guide Award for Favorite Actor (2013–2014); People's Choice Award for Favorite Sci-Fi/Fantasy TV Actor (2014, 2017); Fangoria Chainsaw Award for Best TV Actor (2015); iHorror Award for Best Male Performance – Horror Series (2016); Teen Choice Award for Choice Sci-Fi/Fantasy TV Actor (2016); iHorror Award for Best Actor – Horror Series (2017); Kids' Choice Award for Favorite Male TV Star (2018); People's Choice Award for Favorite Male TV Star (2018); Online Film & Television Association Award for Best Guest Actor in a Drama Series (2019)
