= Carlos Navarro (American actor) =

American actor and radio personality (born 1980)

- Born: December 14, 1980 (age 45); Queens, New York, United States
- Occupations: Actor, Radio Personality
- Years active: 2005–present
- Known for: The Walking Dead, Monsters in the Morning
- Spouse: Megan Navarro (m. 2007)
- Children: 2

Carlos A. Navarro (born December 14, 1980) is an American actor and radio personality.

== Early life and career ==
Navarro was born in 1980 in Queens to a Peru-born father and a Cuba-born mother. He currently lives in Orlando, Florida and is a former co-host of the popular radio show, The Monsters in the Morning

He played the recurring character Alvaro in AMC's The Walking Dead. He also played the role of Enrique in Marvel's "Hawkeye" on Disney+. Navarro was laid off from WTKS Real Radio 104.1 in March 2024 as part of broader iHeartMedia cuts.

== Filmography ==
=== Film ===
| Year | Title | Role | Notes |
|---|---|---|---|
| 2006 | Kiss | Actor Carlos | Short film |
| 2006 | Altered Boy | Prison Guard #2 | |
| 2007 | Sydney White | Football Fan #2 | |
| 2011 | Cassadaga | Todd | |
| 2013 | Identity Thief | Luis the Gas Station Attendant | |
| 2013 | Homefront | Trooper | |
| 2014 | Frank vs God | Luis Castro | |

=== Television ===
| Year | Title | Role | Notes |
|---|---|---|---|
| 2007 | Prison Break | Police Captain | 1 episode |
| 2011 | Charlie's Angels | Goateed 20 Something | 1 episode |
| 2011 | Big Mike | Dr. Bahar | TV movie |
| 2013 | Graceland | Carlos | 1 episode |
| 2016 | Unbreakable Kimmy Schmidt | Coaster Head Joe | 1 episode |
| 2016–2017 | The Walking Dead | Alvaro | Recurring: (Seasons 7-8: 9 episodes) |
| 2017 | Bloodline | Mateo | 2 episodes |
| 2020 | The Outsider | Detective Healy | 3 episodes |
| 2021 | Hawkeye | Enrique | 5 episodes |

=== Video games ===
| Year | Title | Role | Notes |
|---|---|---|---|
| 2005 | Geist | Capt. Juliao | |
| 2018 | Red Dead Redemption 2 | The Local Pedestrian Population | |
| 2018 | Madden NFL 19: Longshot Homecoming | Mario Ortiz | |
| 2019 | Madden NFL 20 | Tony | |
| 2020 | Fallout New Vegas: Brave New World | Chavez | |
