= Coda (The Walking Dead) =

- The Walking Dead episode
- Beth confronts and stands up to Dawn.
- Episode no.: Season 5 Episode 8
- Directed by: Ernest Dickerson
- Written by: Angela Kang
- Cinematography by: Michael E. Satrazemis
- Editing by: Dan Liu
- Original air date: November 30, 2014

Guest appearances
- Lennie James as Morgan Jones (uncredited); Christine Woods as Officer Dawn Lerner; Tyler James Williams as Noah; Erik Jensen as Dr. Steven Edwards; Maximiliano Hernández as Bob Lamson; Rico Ball as Franco; Kyle Clements as McGinley; Christopher Matthew Cook as Licari; Marc Gowan as Percy; Ricky Wayne as Officer O'Donnell; Teri Wyble as Officer Shepherd

Episode chronology
← Previous "Crossed"	Next → "What Happened and What's Going On"
- The Walking Dead season 5

"Coda" is the eighth episode and mid-season finale of the fifth season of the post-apocalyptic horror television series The Walking Dead, which aired on AMC on November 30, 2014. The episode marks Lennie James's second uncredited post-credits appearance in the fifth season as Morgan Jones. The episode was written by Angela Kang and directed by Ernest Dickerson.

The episode primarily takes place in and around Grady Memorial Hospital in Atlanta, where Beth Greene finds herself as Dawn Lerner's ward, discovering her past and finding herself endangered by Officer O'Donnell. Meanwhile, Rick Grimes hunts down Officer Lamson, who has escaped. Father Gabriel Stokes also finds himself chased by walkers as Michonne and Carl Grimes reunite with the returning group, including Beth's sister Maggie Greene, who is informed of her sister's whereabouts. Rick and the others then attempt to arrange a hostage exchange for Beth.

The term "coda" is a musical term which refers to a concluding musical section that is formally distinct from the main structure. The episode title refers to Beth, the only character associated with music. The episode received mixed reviews from television commentators, with many praising aspects such as the opening, but others commenting that the climax is nonsensical or underwhelming. Others praised the performances of Norman Reedus, and Lauren Cohan, as well as the direction of Ernest Dickerson.

== Plot ==
Rick pursues Lamson in a police cruiser. Rick hits Lamson with the car for refusing to stop, crippling him. Despite Lamson's pleas for mercy, Rick kills him. Officers Shepherd and Licari help Rick concoct a story that walkers killed Lamson. Meanwhile, the officers at Grady Memorial lose faith in Dawn's leadership.

Gabriel flees from the church and goes to the school where the remaining Terminus members set up camp. He finds remnants of Bob's leg before being attacked by walkers. Gabriel returns to the church, where Carl and Michonne save him. Overwhelmed, they retreat to the church's refectory. With Judith, they escape through the hole Gabriel made and seal the walkers inside the church. Abraham, Rosita, Eugene, Maggie, and Glenn return, informing them that Eugene lied about his mission. Michonne tells Maggie they are planning to go to Atlanta, where Beth is.

Sergeant O'Donnell confronts Dawn over Beth's involvement in Gorman's death. (Note: As depicted in Slabtown.) O'Donnell and Dawn fight after O'Donnell threatens to oust her. Beth intervenes by shoving O'Donnell down the elevator shaft, killing him. Beth accuses Dawn of manipulating her into killing Gorman and O'Donnell to secure power. Dawn denies the accusation and promises to remember Beth's support. During their conversation, Carol begins to wake up.

Rick negotiates a trade of Shepherd and Licari for Beth and Carol. They agree, and Rick's group meets with Dawn at Grady. As Beth packs up, she hides a pair of scissors in her cast. During the trade, Dawn demands that Noah stays, which he agrees to do. Beth faces Dawn and stabs her with the scissors. Dawn shoots her pistol, killing Beth instantly. Enraged, Daryl kills Dawn. Shepherd defuses the standoff, stating that Dawn was the problem. Dr. Edwards offers to let Rick's group stay, but he declines. Noah accepts Rick's offer of membership to anyone who wishes to join them. As they exit the hospital, they encounter the rest of the group. Maggie collapses in agony when she sees Daryl carrying Beth's body.

In a post-credits scene, Morgan continues to follow the directions to Terminus, coming across the school and later the church. As he explores, he finds the map and written note Abraham had left for Rick, which has Rick's full name written on it. He is shocked to learn that he is following Rick's trail.

== Production ==
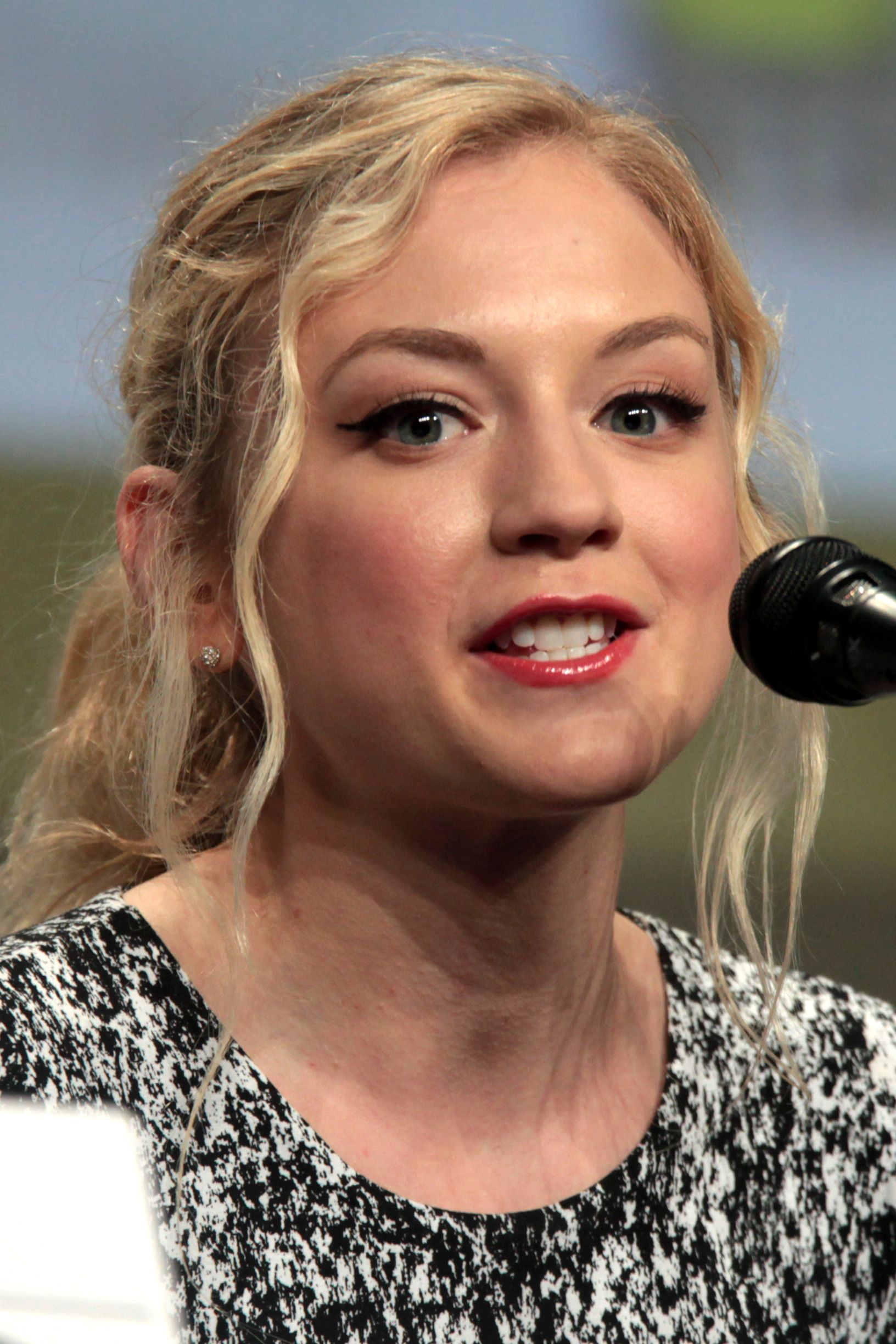
Emily Kinney's character Beth Greene is killed in this episode.

Scott Gimple confirmed the opening sequence — in which Rick chases down Lamson — is an homage to the comic book series in which similar events take place over the Prison-Woodbury conflict with Caesar Martinez, the loyal second-in-command to The Governor.

== Reception ==
Upon airing, the episode was watched by 14.807 million American viewers with an 18-49 rating of 7.6, an increase in viewership from the previous week which had 13.33 million viewers and an 18-49 rating of 7.0. In Australia, it received 0.080 million viewers, making it the highest-rated cable broadcast that day. In the United Kingdom, it garnered 0.885 million viewers, making it the most-watched broadcast that week.

The episode garnered mixed reviews from critics, with many praising the opening sequence and ending. IGN's Matt Fowler, who gave a lukewarm review of the episode, said that though Beth's death was predictable, it "felt like a big moment and it's always wrenching to see other characters react to the death of their loved ones. I liked Beth, but I still mostly felt bad about her death because Daryl and Maggie (who seemed to have to be reminded this week that Beth being gone at all was a topic she should care about) felt bad about it." Fowler ultimately gave the episode a 7.6 out of 10.

Laura Prudom of Variety commented positively on the episode's ending and praised the performances of Lauren Cohan (as Maggie Greene) and Norman Reedus (as Daryl Dixon), saying: "The episode’s final few moments did prove to be some of the series’ most powerful yet — both Lauren Cohan and Norman Reedus gave truly gut-wrenching performances after Beth’s death, and it was heartbreaking to see Maggie’s rapid transition from elation at learning her sister was alive to utter devastation at seeing her dead over the course of twenty minutes."

Zack Handlen of The A.V. Club gave the episode a B− grade, saying that the finale "reminds us that, whatever else it’s learned, the show still hasn't given up on its most beloved trick: killing people because it can. Beth's sudden death was a shock, no question, although I imagine some viewers were expecting just such a gut-punch. There were signs. [...] The result is a deflating conclusion to what had been a promising start."

Dalton Ross of Entertainment Weekly said of the episode as a whole "I've already gone on record as really liking season 5, but it needed a strong eighth episode to keep that momentum going and get people excited for the back half to air in 2015. The show has always delivered on its midseason finales — especially with the Barnageddon massacre (R.I.P. Sophia) of season 2 and last year’s beheading of Hershel — and while this year’s installment may not have equaled either of those examples in terms of pure shock value, it was an emotional and effective hour of television nonetheless."

Kelsea Stahler of Bustle felt that killing Dawn wasted "a perfectly good season 5 villain", which represented a "missed opportunity" to have a female character be the "big bad" and to have the narrative for the rest of the season be based on a conflict between two women (Dawn and Beth). Rob Bricken of io9, in addition to calling the plot one of the "worst of season 5" and the story "more laughable than moving", also criticised the deaths of Dawn and Beth as a "wasted opportunity". He cited the "childish, ridiculous logic" Dawn had for demanding Noah back even though she had "zero leverage" and Beth's "inexplicable, dumb decision" to stab Dawn in the shoulder.
