= Crossed (The Walking Dead) =

- The Walking Dead episode
- Rick, Sasha, Tyreese Williams, and Daryl take police officers of Grady Memorial Hospital as hostages.
- Episode no.: Season 5 Episode 7
- Directed by: Billy Gierhart
- Written by: Seth Hoffman
- Cinematography by: Michael E. Satrazemis
- Editing by: Avi Youabian; Dan Liu
- Original air date: November 23, 2014

Guest appearances
- Christine Woods as Officer Dawn Lerner; Tyler James Williams as Noah; Erik Jensen as Dr. Steven Edwards; Maximiliano Hernández as Bob Lamson; Ricky Wayne as Officer O'Donnell; Teri Wyble as Officer Shepherd; Christopher Matthew Cook as Licari; Marc Gowan as Percy

Episode chronology
← Previous "Consumed"	Next → "Coda"
- The Walking Dead season 5

"Crossed" is the seventh episode of the fifth season of the post-apocalyptic horror television series The Walking Dead, which aired on AMC on November 23, 2014. It was written by Seth Hoffman and directed by Billy Gierhart. In the episode, Michonne and Carl Grimes stay at the barricaded Church with Gabriel Stokes as Rick Grimes and the others go on a rescue mission for Beth Greene and Carol Peletier in Atlanta. The episode received generally positive reviews, though most noted the set up for the mid-season finale. This is the first episode to feature all credited series regulars for the fifth season.

The episode title refers to Rosita Espinosa explaining how she met Abraham Ford and Eugene Porter, crossing paths in Dallas. It also refers to Sasha being double-crossed by Sgt. Bob Lamson.

== Plot ==
Daryl returns to the church with Noah, informing the group that Beth and Carol are at Grady Memorial Hospital in Atlanta. Rick, Daryl, Noah, Tyreese, and Sasha agree to go. Carl attempts to teach Gabriel how to defend himself, but Gabriel refuses to learn. Guilt-ridden and traumatized by Terminus' slaughter, (Note: As depicted in Four Walls and a Roof.) Gabriel removes the floorboards in his office to sneak out of the church.

At Grady, Dawn argues with O'Donnell over their inability to find Noah. Beth listens as they consider letting Carol die. Beth intervenes, and Dawn instructs O'Donnell to take Carol off life support. After he leaves, Dawn chastises Beth but gives her keys to the drug locker so she can save Carol. Beth convinces Dr. Edwards to help her save Carol using epinephrine. Meanwhile, Glenn, Maggie, Tara, and Rosita debate returning to the church. Glenn, Tara, and Rosita search for water while Maggie looks after Eugene, who is still unconscious, and Abraham, who is non-responsive. Rosita tells Glenn and Tara she met Eugene and Abraham in Dallas when they helped her and her group fend off walkers. Eventually, Abraham tells Maggie he still wants to live, and Eugene regains consciousness.

Rick's group arrives in Atlanta, and Rick devises a plan to capture Dawn and force Grady to stand down. However, Tyreese successfully proposes they capture cops to trade for Beth and Carol. Noah lures Sgt. Lamson (Maximiliano Hernández) and Officer Shepherd into an ambush. Lamson and Shepherd briefly escape when a third officer, Officer Licari (Christopher Matthew Cook), arrives as backup, but all three are taken hostage.

The officers insist that Dawn won't trade for them, but vow to oust her and install Lamson in her place if they are let go. However, Lamson tells Rick that Dawn will ultimately make the trade. Still distraught over Bob's death, (Note: As depicted in Four Walls and a Roof.) Sasha converses with Lamson upon learning his name is also Bob. Lamson tells Sasha that his partner, who was killed in the bombings, returned as a walker and that he never had a chance to put him down. Sasha offers to kill his partner, and Lamson guides her shot. However, upon aiming, Lamson tackles Sasha and knocks her out before fleeing.

== Production ==
The melted walkers in Atlanta's streets were a combination of dummies and half-buried actors. The cast was unaware that some of them were real until they started moving. The walker's head that Daryl ripped off was rigged so that the spine would move afterward. There were finger controls for the spine inside of the eye sockets.

== Reception ==
Upon airing, the episode was watched by 13.33 million American viewers with an 18-49 rating of 7.0, a decrease in viewership from the previous week which had 14.07 million viewers and an 18-49 rating of 7.3.

In Australia, it received 0.101 million viewers, making it the highest-rated cable broadcast that day.

The episode received generally positive reviews. Matt Fowler of IGN rated it 8.2 out of 10 saying that the episode "had some cool, intense moments". Tim Surette of TV.com, in a mixed review, wrote, "The penultimate episode of Season 5A, "Crossed" wasn't a bad episode, but it immediately jumps to the front of the line for the title of worst—no, wait, that sounds bad, so let's say "least good"—episode of Season 5 so far." However, the reviewer also stated that "the episode did appropriately set things up for The Walking Dead's winter finale." Zack Handlen, writing for The A.V. Club, gave the episode a "B+", stating that "in short, The Walking Dead has gotten better at balancing hope against despair."

In a mixed review, Sean McKenna of TV Fanatic wrote that "[the episode] was necessary to pull everything that’s come in The Walking Dead Season 5 back together towards its new central focus, its new central direction," while also stating that "I wasn't wowed by this episode, but it wasn't abysmal." Jeff Stone of Indiewire gave the episode a "B−". Alex Straker, writing for The Independent, wrote that " 'Crossed' is an episode that highlights the strengths and flaws of the fifth series."
