= The Walking Dead season 5 =

Season of television series

The Walking Dead
- Season 5
- Promotional poster for the mid-season premiere. Also used as home media cover art.
- Showrunner: Scott M. Gimple
- Starring: Andrew Lincoln; Norman Reedus; Steven Yeun; Lauren Cohan; Chandler Riggs; Danai Gurira; Melissa McBride; Michael Cudlitz; Emily Kinney; Chad L. Coleman; Sonequa Martin-Green; Lawrence Gilliard Jr.; Josh McDermitt; Christian Serratos; Alanna Masterson; Andrew J. West; Seth Gilliam
- No. of episodes: 16

Release
- Original network: AMC
- Original release: October 12, 2014 – March 29, 2015

Season chronology
- ← Previous; Season 4 Next → Season 6

The fifth season of The Walking Dead, an American post-apocalyptic horror television series on AMC, premiered on October 12, 2014, and concluded on March 29, 2015, consisting of 16 episodes. Developed for television by Frank Darabont, the series is based on the eponymous series of comic books by Robert Kirkman, Tony Moore, and Charlie Adlard. The executive producers were Kirkman, David Alpert, Scott M. Gimple, Greg Nicotero, Tom Luse, and Gale Anne Hurd, with Gimple as showrunner for the second consecutive season. The fifth season received widespread critical acclaim. It was nominated for multiple awards and won three, including Best Syndicated/Cable Television Series for the third consecutive year, at the 41st Saturn Awards.

This season adapts material from issues #61–77 of the comic book series and introduces notable comic characters, including the cannibalistic hunters from Terminus, Father Gabriel Stokes (Seth Gilliam) and Aaron (Ross Marquand), as well as the Anderson and Monroe families. Now reunited, the season continues the story of Rick Grimes (Andrew Lincoln) and his group of survivors as they search for sanctuary, but face new threats from both walkers and other (hostile) human survivors. It also marks the return of Morgan Jones (Lennie James), who was last seen in the third-season episode "Clear."

The first half of the season focuses on the group's escape from Terminus, after finding themselves in a vulnerable situation, where they learn the true motives of the Terminans; as well as the rescue of Beth Greene (Emily Kinney) from Grady Memorial Hospital in Atlanta. In the midst of events, part of the group travels to Washington, D.C., in search of a possible cure for the walker virus. The second half of the season focuses on the group's addition and experience in a newfound sanctuary, Alexandria Safe-Zone, a walled-off community whose inhabitants have little experience dealing with external threats.

== Cast ==
The primary characters of the fifth season include (from left to right): Glenn, Maggie, Tara, Carol, Bob, Sasha, Tyreese, Rick, Daryl, Michonne, Carl, Beth, Abraham, Rosita, and Eugene; absent: Gabriel and Gareth

=== Main cast ===
The fifth season features seventeen series regulars, with ten actors receiving opening credits billing; the other seven are credited as "Also starring." Michael Cudlitz, who portrays Sgt. Abraham Ford, is added in the opening sequence, after being listed as recurring in the previous season, as are Emily Kinney and Chad L. Coleman, who portray Beth Greene and Tyreese Williams, respectively, after previously being credited as "Also starring." Credited as "Also starring" are Josh McDermitt, Christian Serratos, Alanna Masterson, and Andrew J. West, who were promoted to series regulars, after being listed as recurring in the previous season, and Seth Gilliam, who joins the main cast as Father Gabriel Stokes. Kinney and Coleman's names were removed from the opening credits after episode nine; they were added back in episode thirteen for a brief flashback scene.

==== Starring ====
- Andrew Lincoln as Rick Grimes, the series' protagonist, who has recently overcome a struggle to balance his brutality with humanity. Lincoln also voices the role of a radio broadcaster, using his natural accent in the episode "What Happened and What's Going On."
- Norman Reedus as Daryl Dixon, the group's primary hunter, who has overcome his past issues with abuse.
- Steven Yeun as Glenn Rhee, a former pizza delivery boy has undergone a maturation and is now Maggie's husband. He acts as one of the group's primary supply runners.
- Lauren Cohan as Maggie Greene, Glenn's strong-willed and determined wife, who has recently lost her father.
- Chandler Riggs as Carl Grimes, Rick's teenage son, whose recklessness clashes with his morality.
- Danai Gurira as Michonne, a fierce, katana-wielding survivor, who has overcome the trauma of the death of her son and boyfriend, forming a close relationship with the Grimes family.
- Melissa McBride as Carol Peletier, a resourceful and empowered former victim of domestic abuse, who is attempting to rebound from several tragedies.
- Michael Cudlitz as Sgt. Abraham Ford, a former military sergeant and boyfriend of Rosita. He pursues a mission to take Eugene to Washington, D.C., to find a cure for the walker virus.
- Emily Kinney as Beth Greene, Maggie's kidnapped younger sister, who has formed a close bond with Daryl since the assault on the prison.
- Chad L. Coleman as Tyreese Williams, Sasha's older brother, who is tough, compassionate, and optimistic and places an emphasis on moral reasoning. He struggles to cope with the immoral nature of some of the group's survival tactics and finds it difficult to kill in defense of the group.

==== Also starring ====
- Sonequa Martin-Green as Sasha Williams, Tyreese's fiery younger sister and a former firefighter, who has since developed a relationship with Bob.
- Lawrence Gilliard Jr. as Bob Stookey, a former army medic and recovering alcoholic, who has formed a close relationship with Sasha, and has developed a renewed sense of optimism.
- Josh McDermitt as Dr. Eugene Porter, a scientist rescued by Abraham, who insists on traveling to Washington, D.C., to locate a cure to the walker virus.
- Christian Serratos as Rosita Espinosa, Abraham's girlfriend, who helps escort Eugene to Washington, D.C., and is protective of Tara and Eugene.
- Alanna Masterson as Tara Chambler, a former police academy student and ally of The Governor's, the only surviving member of her family, who often tries to boost the group's morale.
- Andrew J. West as Gareth, the pragmatic leader of Terminus a group of cannibals, who captures and coerces Rick's group into submission, and the primary antagonist of the first three episodes of the season.
- Seth Gilliam as Gabriel Stokes, a cowardly priest, who lives alone in his church, whose encounter with Rick's group leads him to challenge his beliefs.

=== Supporting cast ===
==== Terminus ====
- Denise Crosby as Mary, one of Terminus residents; Gareth and Alex's mother.
- Tate Ellington as Alex, a Terminus resident; Mary's son, and Gareth's brother, killed by friendly fire aimed at Rick, in season 4; he appears alive in a flashback and as a corpse in the present.

==== The Hunters ====
- Chris Coy as Martin, a Terminus man, one of the Hunters; he has a score to settle with Tyreese and later appears in his hallucinations.
- Benjamin Papac as Albert, one of the Hunters, who tries to retaliate against Rick's group.
- Chris Burns as Mike, one of the Hunters, following leader Gareth to take revenge on Rick's group for the destruction of their home.
- April Billingsley as Theresa, a Terminus woman, one of the Hunters.
- Travis Young as Greg, a Terminus man, one of the Hunters.

==== Grady Memorial Hospital ====
- Tyler James Williams as Noah, a survivor Beth encounters, who originates from a walled community in Richmond, Virginia but was abducted and forced to stay in Grady. He is shown to be very resourceful but has minimal experience in the outside world. He initially feels distant from the group despite their having accepted him as part of the family, but he eventually becomes more settled in with them.
- Christine Woods as Dawn Lerner, a corrupt, manipulator, sadistic and violent police leader of Grady Memorial Hospital and the secondary antagonist of the first half of the season.
- Ricky Wayne as O'Donnell, a violent and cynical police officer fed up with Dawn's leadership style, despite their having been friends since they were rookies, and who seeks to eliminate her. O'Donnell and Dawn also disagree about how they should conserve their resources, which O'Donnell mainly schemes to use for his selfish uses.
- Erik Jensen as Dr. Steven Edwards, a scheming doctor secretly working for Lt. Lerner, who takes a liking to Beth. Ironically, he preserves his importance, as the only doctor at Grady, by killing captives ("patients").
- Teri Wyble as Amanda Shepherd, a police officer and subordinate of Dawn's, who greatly distrusts her and is aware of the paranoid monster Dawn has become. Amanda is far more reasonable than Dawn and will do whatever it takes to avoid bloodshed.
- Maximiliano Hernández as Bob Lamson, a police officer, subordinate, and old friend of Dawn's, who respects Rick and is one of the more compassionate cops at Grady, though he isn't unwilling to use brutality to ensure his own survival. Despite his resentment of Dawn's leadership, Bob is distrusting of strangers.
- Christopher Matthew Cook as Licari, a police officer and subordinate of Dawn's, who like Shepherd is aware of what she really is and knows how to work around her.
- Keisha Castle-Hughes as Joan, a survivor Beth encounters who'd been raped by the other cops at Grady and attempted to escape, only to have her arm bitten and forcibly amputated, despite her preference to die.
- Cullen Moss as Gorman, an abusive and manipulative police officer, who "rescued" Beth in the previous season; he rapes the women at Grady and quickly comes to antagonize Beth.

==== Alexandria Safe-Zone ====
- Ross Marquand as Aaron, a former NGO worker and now recruiter for the Alexandria Safe-Zone, who takes in Rick's group and forms a friendship with Daryl based on their both feeling like outsiders in their respective ways; Aaron's is attributable to his homosexuality.
- Tovah Feldshuh as Deanna Monroe, a fierce yet understanding former Congresswoman, who is now the leader of the Alexandria Safe-Zone. Though she is confident Rick's group can help them survive, she is somewhat leery about their increasingly prominent roles in the community.
- Alexandra Breckenridge as Jessie Anderson, a former hairstylist, who lives in Alexandria with her sons, Ron and Sam, and husband, Pete. She helps Rick adjust to the community, and Rick quickly becomes attracted to Jessie, which seems mutual, and they share moments of flirtation. It's later revealed that Pete is abusing her, leading to a brutal conflict between him and Rick.
- Corey Brill as Pete Anderson, Alexandria's resident surgeon and Jessie's abusive husband; his actions culminate in a conflict between himself and Rick. Because Pete has saved lives, Deanna turns a blind eye to his abusive tendencies towards Jessie, just as Jessie remains unwilling to report or leave Pete; both women hope he'll get better. He is the primary antagonist of the second half of the season.
- Jason Douglas as Tobin, the foreman of Alexandria's construction crew, who is willing to let some members of his crew die to preserve the lives of the others.
- Steve Coulter as Reg Monroe, Deanna's husband and an architect; he built Alexandria's walls and, unlike Deanna, understands Rick's brutality and desires to keep everyone together believing it's the only way to rebuild civilization.
- Michael Traynor as Nicholas, a supply runner for Alexandria, whose cowardly nature has led to other people's getting killed; he forms a bitter grudge against Glenn.
- Jordan Woods-Robinson as Eric Raleigh, a survivor, who lives in Alexandria, Aaron's boyfriend and former recruiting partner. He, like Aaron, is viewed as an outsider for his homosexuality. After Eric's leg injury Daryl replaces him as Aaron's recruiting partner.
- Major Dodson as Sam Anderson, Jessie and Pete's younger son, who forms an attachment with Carol. He is fully aware of his father's abusive tendencies towards his mother and desires a gun to protect her, much to Jessie's heartbreak.
- Austin Nichols as Spencer Monroe, Deanna and Reg's younger son and Aiden's brother; he takes a liking to Sasha. Despite having an ego, he is more level headed than Aiden.
- Austin Abrams as Ron Anderson, Jessie's older son, and a friend of Mikey and Carl's. He is in a relationship with Enid.
- Daniel Bonjour as Aiden Monroe, Alexandria's chief supply runner, and Deanna and Reg's egotistical elder son; he quickly comes to odds with Glenn over the nature of how to handle supply runs.
- Katelyn Nacon as Enid, an introverted teenager recruited to Alexandria eight months prior to the arrival of Rick's group; Carl has a crush on her, but she is dating Ron.
- Elijah Marcano as Mikey, a teenager in Alexandria and a friend of Ron, Carl, and Enid's.
- Ann Mahoney as Olivia, an Alexandria resident, who is in charge of the community's food and armory.
- Ted Huckabee as Bruce, a member of the construction crew, who looks up to Abraham.
- Dahlia Legault as Francine, a tough member of the construction crew, whom Tobin is willing to sacrifice, and thus she has a grudge against him.
- Mandi Christine Kerr as Barbara, resident of Alexandria.
- Tiffany Morgan as Erin, resident of Alexandria, who befriends Carol.
- Susie Spear Purcell as Shelly Neudermeyer, resident of Alexandria, that has an obsessive eagerness for the machines to make pastas.

==== Miscellaneous ====
- Lennie James as Morgan Jones, the first survivor Rick encountered, who had previously suffered mental problems following the loss of his son.
- David Morrissey as The Governor, the unstable and maniacal deceased former leader of Woodbury, whose actions destroyed the prison in season 4, appears as a hallucination.
- Benedict Samuel as Wolves Leader, the cold, greedy, uncaring leader of the Wolves, who kill people and take their supplies. They carve "W"s on people's foreheads and let them turn into walkers. Showrunner Scott M. Gimple revealed that "Owen" is one of possible names for the character.
- Jesse C. Boyd as Nick, the second-in-command of the Wolves.
- Brighton Sharbino and Kyla Kenedy as Lizzie and Mika Samuels, two deceased young sisters previously under the care of Tyreese and Carol. They appear in hallucinations.
- Robin Lord Taylor as Sam, an inexperienced yet positive minded survivor, whom Rick had previously encountered on a supply run but disappeared after his girlfriend Ana was killed by walkers.

== Production ==
The series was renewed for a fifth season on October 29, 2013. The season began filming on May 5, 2014, and finished on November 22, 2014. Scott M. Gimple continued the role of showrunner, a position he held since the fourth season. In January 2015, it was announced that Ross Marquand had been cast in a series regular role, to debut during the second half of the season. It was believed Marquand would be playing Aaron, a prominent character from the comic book series. The character debuted in the tenth episode, "Them", and his role as Aaron was officially confirmed. This season also introduces prominent characters from the graphic novels, besides Aaron, including Bruce, Eric, Nicholas, Olivia, and Tobin. The season finale aired in an expanded 90-minute time slot.

The titles of the final five episodes of the season ("Remember", "Forget", "Spend", "Try", and "Conquer"), which feature the characters in the Alexandria Safe-Zone, refer to William Faulkner's novel The Sound and the Fury, which Dale quotes from the first season episode "Vatos".

=== Writing ===
Scott M. Gimple remarked that the television series would be following its source material more than ever in the fifth season, with exceptions including original characters such as Daryl Dixon, and deceased characters from the comics alive in the television series and vice versa.

The fifth season adapted material from the comic books "Volume 10: What We Become", "Volume 11: Fear the Hunters", "Volume 12: Life Among Them", and "Volume 13: Too Far Gone". While the television series has remained faithful, the character of Beth Greene and her story arc have been largely made up for the television series. Despite this, the scenario in which Rick Grimes chases down a man who betrayed the group's trust was a moment from the source material, albeit with a different character.

== Episodes ==
No. overall	No. in season	Title	Directed by	Written by	Original release date	U.S. viewers (millions)
52	1	"No Sanctuary"	Greg Nicotero	Scott M. Gimple	October 12, 2014	17.29
Carol and Tyreese capture a Terminus ally, Martin, learning their friends have been captured and will likely be cannibalized by Gareth and the other Terminus survivors. While Tyreese stays back with Judith and Martin, Carol uses a herd of walkers as a distraction to free Rick and the others. Rick and Carl finally reunite with Judith. Once regrouped, the others convince Rick to forget attacking Terminus and instead head towards Washington, D.C.
53	2	"Strangers"	David Boyd	Robert Kirkman	October 19, 2014	15.14
Rick's group saves Father Gabriel Stokes from walkers, and he provides them shelter in his church; his motives are suspicious, leaving some anxious to continue on. Carol withdraws from the group, followed by Daryl, when they see a car with a white cross on its window, the same as the one Daryl saw abduct Beth, and the two follow it. Bob is captured by the remaining Terminus survivors led by Gareth, who proceed to amputate and consume his leg.
54	3	"Four Walls and a Roof"	Jeffrey F. January	Angela Kang & Corey Reed	October 26, 2014	13.80
Father Gabriel is forced to reveal he had let his congregation be consumed by walkers while he barricaded himself inside, and is now experiencing a crisis of faith. Gareth leaves Bob outside the church, and Rick leads a group to finish off Gareth in retribution. Gareth uses this opportunity to attack the church, but is ambushed and killed by Rick's group. Rick insists they wait for Daryl and Carol's return before leaving, but Abraham and Rosita decide to continue on escorting Eugene to D.C., with Glenn, Maggie, and Tara coming along. Abraham leaves a map for Rick to follow him once he is ready to leave.
55	4	"Slabtown"	Michael E. Satrazemis	Matthew Negrete & Channing Powell	November 2, 2014	14.52
Beth awakens in Grady Memorial Hospital in Atlanta, finding it run and protected by police officers led by Officer Dawn Lerner. Though they provide medical treatment, they force those in their care to help and forgo medical treatment on the weakest. When Beth goes against these policies, she is berated by Dawn. Beth befriends fellow patient, Noah, and the two attempt to escape together. Noah escapes, but Beth is caught, punished, and instructed to kill a corrupt doctor; just then, she sees an unconscious Carol being wheeled into the hospital.
56	5	"Self Help"	Ernest Dickerson	Heather Bellson & Seth Hoffman	November 9, 2014	13.53
Abraham's group heads north, where Eugene's insecurities lead to some conflict within the group. They come across a wide expanse of fields that are filled with walkers, and Abraham and Glenn get into an argument on what to do. During this, Eugene reveals that he lied about being a scientist or knowing a cure, only using that to inspire Abraham to help protect him when they first met. Abraham punches Eugene out, and then drops to knees in shock and disbelief.
57	6	"Consumed"	Seith Mann	Matthew Negrete & Corey Reed	November 16, 2014	14.07
Daryl and Carol follow the car to Atlanta, where they have their gear stolen by Noah. They discover the white cross vehicles are from Grady Memorial, and use a building across the street to study the hospital. There, they encounter Noah again, who apologizes and gives back their gear, as well as telling them about Beth. With the police from the hospital en route to their building, the three escape, but Carol is hit by a speeding police car and taken to the hospital.
58	7	"Crossed"	Billy Gierhart	Seth Hoffman	November 23, 2014	13.33
Though Dawn believes Carol is a lost cause and orders treatment to be denied, Beth is able to provide her with life-saving medicine. Daryl and Noah return to the church to recruit Rick and others to rescue Beth. The group returns to Atlanta and devise a plan to capture some of the police officers to use as a trade for Carol and Beth.
59	8	"Coda"	Ernest Dickerson	Angela Kang	November 30, 2014	14.81
At the church, Gabriel inadvertently leads a group of walkers to it, but Abraham and his group arrive in time to protect the others. They all agree to head to Atlanta to help. Rick negotiates to trade the captured officers for Carol and Beth. In the trade confrontation, Beth stabs Dawn, who instinctively shoots and kills Beth; Daryl reacts by killing Dawn. The groups stand down and Rick's group leaves the hospital with Beth's corpse, eventually meeting with Abraham's group.
60	9	"What Happened and What's Going On"	Greg Nicotero	Scott M. Gimple	February 8, 2015	15.64
Rick's group heads north, and a small group of Rick, Tyreese, Glenn, and Michonne take Noah to his hometown community, which he claims was protected. They find the community has been overrun with walkers, and Noah panics; Tyreese is bitten by a walker while protecting him. Tyreese has visions of several now-dead survivors, while Michonne amputates the bitten arm. Despite this, Tyreese dies as they race back to join the others.
61	10	"Them"	Julius Ramsay	Heather Bellson	February 15, 2015	12.27
The group's vehicle breaks down, forcing them to continue on foot towards D.C. After a run-in with a small horde of walkers and feral dogs, Daryl suggests the group take shelter in a small barn. They find a number of water bottles and jugs with a note saying they are from a "friend," but Rick is wary and orders them to avoid it. The next morning, the group is approached by Aaron, identifying himself as a "friend."
62	11	"The Distance"	Larysa Kondracki	Seth Hoffman	February 22, 2015	13.44
Aaron tells Rick's group about Alexandria, a walled-off and safe-zone community, and that he wants them to "audition" to join their community. Despite Aaron telling them truthfully of vehicles waiting nearby to take them to Alexandria, Rick remains distrustful, fearing a repeat of Woodbury and Terminus. Michonne convinces Rick that they should at least check it out; Aaron leads the group to Alexandria's gates.
63	12	"Remember"	Greg Nicotero	Channing Powell	March 1, 2015	14.43
Rick's group turn over their weapons before meeting with Alexandria's leader, Deanna Monroe. She gives them individual private interviews, and assigns them quarters to wait out their decision. The group starts to integrate with the other Alexandria survivors, finding they are generally ill-prepared for dealing with walkers. Deanna gives Rick and Michonne constable duties as a show of trust, but Rick confides to Carol and Daryl that they will take over if the community fails to protect itself.
64	13	"Forget"	David Boyd	Corey Reed	March 8, 2015	14.53
Though Rick's group is welcomed to the community, Rick, Daryl, and Carol meet privately to discuss how to recover and stash their weapons from the Alexandria armory as backup plans should they need to exert control.
65	14	"Spend"	Jennifer Lynch	Matthew Negrete	March 15, 2015	13.78
Abraham takes control of the Alexandria construction crew after rescuing them from walkers. Glenn, Noah, Deanna's son Aiden, and an Alexandrian named Nicholas search for equipment to repair the community's solar panels. They are ambushed by walkers, who kill Aiden and corner the others. Glenn almost saves Noah before a panicking Nicholas sacrifices him to the walkers to escape. Deanna observes that members of Rick's group seem to be taking charge of the community; Gabriel warns Deanna that Rick's group is dangerous. Carol determines that Pete, the town's surgeon, is abusing his wife Jessie and son Sam, and suggests to Rick he must kill Pete.
66	15	"Try"	Michael E. Satrazemis	Angela Kang	March 22, 2015	13.76
Nicholas falsely blames Glenn for the deaths of Aiden and Noah, leading Deanna to confiscate Rick's groups' firearms. Tensions escalate further after Deanna reveals she knows of Pete's abuse, but won't stop it as he is their only surgeon. Rick tries to approach Jessie privately to offer his protection against Pete, but Pete interrupts, leading to a physical fight between him and Rick, and a public confrontation between Rick and Deanna; Rick asserts Alexandria's residents have grown too complacent to survive. Michonne knocks Rick out before he can cause further damage.
67	16	"Conquer"	Greg Nicotero	Scott M. Gimple & Seth Hoffman	March 29, 2015	15.78
Deanna prepares to hold a meeting to discuss exiling Rick for his last outburst, and Rick prepares his group to move into action should they decide to do so. Glenn confronts and beats Nicholas until he begs for his life, and Glenn spares him. Daryl and Aaron discover that the Wolves, a group of scavengers camping near Alexandria, threaten the community, and come across Morgan Jones, who has been following Rick's trail. As the meeting starts, Rick discovers some walkers inside the community, allowed in inadvertently by Gabriel, and shows one of the bodies to the gathered Alexandrians, showing that they need his help to survive. Pete barges into the meeting to kill Rick, but accidentally kills Deanna's husband instead. Distraught, Deanna orders Rick to execute Pete, which he does just as Daryl, Aaron, and Morgan arrive.

== Reception ==
=== Critical response ===
The fifth season of The Walking Dead has received critical acclaim. On Metacritic, the season holds a score of 80 out of 100, indicating "generally favorable" reviews, based on 11 critics. On Rotten Tomatoes, the season holds an 90% with an average rating of 6.95 out of 10 based on 374 reviews. The site's critical consensus reads: "Thanks to a liberal dose of propulsive, bloody action and enough compelling character moments to reward longtime fans, The Walking Dead's fifth season continues to deliver top-notch entertainment." Brian Lowry of Variety gave the fifth-season premiere a positive review, saying: "After the (rather too) long and winding road to Terminus, 'The Walking Dead' opens its fifth season in spectacular fashion, a dazzling adrenaline rush filled with suspense, righteous violence and, before it's all over, genuine emotion. Imbued with cinematic touches, the only downside to this breathtaking episode is pondering what the creative brain trust can do for an encore. Still, AMC's megahit finds itself in a very good place, from the current makeup of its ever-evolving cast to the latitude it has earned to take unexpected detours. Given the hype surrounding the series, it's still impressive to see the producers deliver such a feast."

Several critics have felt the fifth season has been a huge improvement to its preceding seasons. Emily VanDerWerff for Vox, wrote: "...it's not unprecedented for a series to have its best season in its fifth year, but it's definitely strange for a show to make this big of a leap this late in its run." She praised all aspects of the storytelling and conception of the fifth season, singling out the action, themes, characters, advanced storylines, newly introduced anthology character-focused episodes, and overall improvements to the material the show has always worked with.

Similarly, writing for Grantland, Andy Greenwald praised Scott M. Gimple as showrunner, particularly noting him as an improvement to Glen Mazzara and Frank Darabont, as well as praising the increase in minorities and resulting racial diversity among the main cast. He further commented: "Gimple has also done wonders with the characters he inherited," and singled out characters such as Beth Greene and Tyreese, praising their newly established complexities and character evolution. The constantly shifting environments and surrounding threats were also noted and lauded. Zack Handlen of The A.V. Club in his review of "Consumed," summarized the season as a whole, saying: "This is a large part of why The Walking Dead has gotten so good this season: The writers have found a way to exploit subtext and history in compelling, haunting ways."

Laura Prudom of Variety on her review of "Conquer" commented that "...season five represents a marked improvement over the stagnation of previous years, with the promise of Alexandria breathing new life into the series, offering our group a form of opposition that isn't inherently wrong, unlike The Governor or the Termites." She assessed it as having "arguably been "The Walking Dead's" best yet, propelled by compulsive story threads and fascinating character dynamics."

The Walking Dead season 5: Critical reception by episode
Season 5 (2014–15): Percentage of positive critics' reviews tracked by the website Rotten Tomatoes

=== Accolades ===
For the 41st Saturn Awards, the fifth season of The Walking Dead received seven nominations and three wins. The wins were for Best Syndicated/Cable Television Series, Best Actor on Television (Andrew Lincoln), and Best Supporting Actress on Television (Melissa McBride). The nominations were for Best Supporting Actor on Television (Norman Reedus), Best Supporting Actress on Television (Emily Kinney), Best Performance by a Younger Actor in a Television Series (Chandler Riggs), and Best Guest Starring Role on Television (Andrew J. West).

The season also received four Primetime Emmy Award nominations, the most for an individual season of the series currently, for the 67th Primetime Creative Arts Emmy Awards, but failed to win any. The nominations were for Outstanding Prosthetic Make-up for a Series, Limited Series, Movie, or Special ("Strangers"), Outstanding Sound Editing for a Series ("Conquer"), Outstanding Special Visual Effects in a Supporting Role ("Conquer"), and Outstanding Stunt Coordination for a Drama Series, Limited Series, or Movie (Monty Simons). Additionally, the season was also nominated for Outstanding Performance by a Stunt Ensemble in a Television Series at the 21st and 22nd Screen Actors Guild Awards for both halves of the season, respectively.

=== Ratings ===
Viewership and ratings per episode of The Walking Dead season 5
No.	Title	Air date	Rating (18–49)	Viewers (millions)	DVR (18–49)	DVR viewers (millions)	Total (18–49)	Total viewers (millions)
1	"No Sanctuary"	October 12, 2014	8.7	17.29	2.7	5.09	11.4	22.37^{1}
2	"Strangers"	October 19, 2014	7.7	15.14	—N/a	—N/a	—N/a	—N/a
3	"Four Walls and a Roof"	October 26, 2014	7.0	13.80	—N/a	—N/a	—N/a	—N/a
4	"Slabtown"	November 2, 2014	7.6	14.52	—N/a	—N/a	—N/a	—N/a
5	"Self Help"	November 9, 2014	6.9	13.53	—N/a	—N/a	—N/a	—N/a
6	"Consumed"	November 16, 2014	7.3	14.07	—N/a	—N/a	—N/a	—N/a
7	"Crossed"	November 23, 2014	7.0	13.33	—N/a	—N/a	—N/a	—N/a
8	"Coda"	November 30, 2014	7.6	14.81	—N/a	—N/a	—N/a	—N/a
9	"What Happened and What’s Going On"	February 8, 2015	8.0	15.64	—N/a	—N/a	—N/a	—N/a
10	"Them"	February 15, 2015	6.2	12.27	—N/a	—N/a	—N/a	—N/a
11	"The Distance"	February 22, 2015	6.9	13.44	—N/a	—N/a	—N/a	—N/a
12	"Remember"	March 1, 2015	7.5	14.43	—N/a	—N/a	—N/a	—N/a
13	"Forget"	March 8, 2015	7.3	14.53	2.5	4.60	9.8	19.13^{1}
14	"Spend"	March 15, 2015	7.0	13.78	2.8	5.20	9.8	18.98^{1}
15	"Try"	March 22, 2015	7.0	13.76	2.4	4.41	9.4	18.17^{1}
16	"Conquer"	March 29, 2015	8.2	15.78	2.9	5.64	11.1	21.43

^1 Live +7 ratings were not available, so Live +3 ratings have been used instead.

== Broadcast ==
The first half of the season premiered on Fox International Channels on October 13, 2014. Episodes air a day later than in the United States. The second half debuted on February 9, 2015.

== Home media releases ==
The fifth season was released on DVD and Blu-ray in region 1/A on August 25, 2015. Special features include "Inside The Walking Dead" and "The Making of The Walking Dead" featurettes for every episode; eight other featurettes titled, "Beth's Journey," "Bob's Journey," "Noah's Journey," "Tyreese's Journey," "A Day in the Life of Michael Cudlitz," "A Day in the Life of Josh McDermitt," and "Rotters in the Flesh"; deleted scenes; and audio commentaries with cast and crew. A special limited edition Blu-ray packaging set, featuring the "asphalt" walker, designed by Greg Nicotero and sculpted by McFarlane Toys, was released on December 1, 2015.
