= Beth Greene =

Fictional character

- The Walking Dead character
- Beth Greene, as portrayed by Emily Kinney in the television series.
- First appearance: "Bloodletting" (2011)
- Last appearance: "Genesis" (2026)
- Created by: Glen Mazzara
- Portrayed by: Emily Kinney

In-universe information
- Occupation: High school student Farmhand; Dawn Lerner's Ward at Grady Memorial Hospital
- Family: Hershel Greene (father); Annette Greene (mother); Maggie Greene (half-sister); Shawn Greene (half-brother); Arnold Greene (cousin); Glenn Rhee (brother-in-law); Hershel Rhee (nephew)
- Significant others: Jimmy (first Boyfriend); Zach (second Boyfriend)

Beth Greene is a fictional character from the American horror drama television series The Walking Dead, created by season two showrunner Glen Mazzara, and was portrayed by Emily Kinney. She is the daughter of veterinarian and farmer Hershel Greene and the younger half-sister of Maggie. Unlike the majority of the series' cast of characters, Beth has no specific counterpart in the comic book series on which the show is based.

Described as a source of optimism and hope for the group, often singing to help boost morale, Beth is soft-spoken and a devout Christian teenager. After the loss of her mother, Beth attempts suicide but ultimately chooses to live. During the initial outbreak and beyond, Beth is a sheltered girl, but is eventually forced into hard laboring survival after the downfall of the prison, a place that had been a safe haven. She forms a close bond with fellow survivor and group member Daryl Dixon. Her final arc revolves around being held captive under the service of Officer Dawn Lerner in Grady Memorial Hospital in Atlanta, and the subsequent efforts of Rick's group to find and rescue her become the primary driving force behind the first half of the fifth season.

Beth's character arc in the series has garnered acclaim from television critics, who praised her strong characterization, colorful story arc, and relationship with Daryl Dixon. Numerous television journalists have cited Beth Greene as one of the series' best and finest characters. Emily Kinney received a nomination from the Saturn Awards for "Best Supporting Actress on Television" in 2015 for her performance during the show's fifth season, losing to fellow costar Melissa McBride.

== Appearances ==
=== Season 2 ===
Beth Greene is Hershel's (Scott Wilson) second daughter and Maggie's (Lauren Cohan) younger, half-sister. She is introduced in the second-season episode "Bloodletting", alongside her family and boyfriend, Jimmy (James Allen McCune) when Rick Grimes (Andrew Lincoln) and his group come to the family farm. Along with her family, she believes members of her now reanimated family to be sick, until the events of the mid-season finale "Pretty Much Dead Already" where she is forced to watch the undead her family kept in the barn get shot, and in the episode "Nebraska", her own reanimated mother being put down after attacking her. This event drives her nearly to suicide in the episode "18 Miles Out", but she decides to live. After the group are forced to leave the overrun farm in the second-season finale "Beside the Dying Fire", in which several of her loved ones, including her boyfriend are killed, she is forced to deal with the apocalyptic world.

=== Season 3 ===
Beth becomes more self-assured and becomes a contributing member to Rick's group. She sings to help boost morale and spreads optimism among her survivors upon finding a place to live at the prison in the third-season premiere "Seed". When Hershel's leg is amputated after a walker bite in the episode "Sick", Beth chides Maggie for being pessimistic about his chances of survival. Beth devotes much of her time to assisting Hershel throughout his recovery, and also becomes a caretaker for Judith after Lori Grimes (Sarah Wayne Callies)'s death in the episode "Killer Within".

=== Season 4 ===
Beth developed a relationship with one of the prison newcomers, Zach (Kyle Gallner). When he is killed in a walker attack in the season premiere "30 Days Without an Accident", she quietly accepts his fate. She opens up to fellow survivor Daryl Dixon (Norman Reedus) about this loss, and proclaims she doesn't cry anymore. In the episode "Isolation", Beth continues to attempt to suppress her sadness in front of Maggie when the deadly virus at the prison spreads. It infects Glenn (Steven Yeun) and endangers Hershel, who goes to the sick ward to help. During the Governor's (David Morrissey) attack on the prison in the episode "Too Far Gone", Beth and Maggie watch in horror as Hershel is decapitated during the battle. Subsequently, the sisters are separated and Beth flees with Daryl. In the episodes "Inmates" and "Still", Beth and Daryl travel alone together, where the two come into conflict over the likelihood of finding the other survivors. Beth confronts Daryl on his emotional detachment, forcing him to open up and show faith in the other people who could still be alive. He begins to teach her how to use a crossbow in the episode "Alone" where the two have found a mutual respect for one another. However, this newfound bond is quickly disrupted by walkers swarming the house, forcing her to escape outside where she gets kidnapped.

=== Season 5 ===
Beth spends her time at Grady Memorial Hospital in Atlanta, starting with the fifth-season episode "Slabtown". She has been taken in by a group of police officers led by Dawn Lerner (Christine Woods). Kept against her will in a dangerous environment where she is mistreated and abused along with the other patients and wards, Beth devises a plan with Noah (Tyler James Williams) to escape, which involves escaping through the elevator. While Noah is successful, she finds herself caught fighting walkers and is eventually disarmed by the officers who find her. Later, Dawn shows signs of respect for Beth once she takes Noah's place as her ward but Beth openly tells her that she will find another way to escape. As Carol Peletier (Melissa McBride) is wheeled into the hospital injured from a car accident in an attempt to rescue her along with Daryl, Beth devises another plan to retrieve medicine to save her life in the episode "Crossed". In the mid-season finale "Coda", a hostage exchange occurs when Rick's group, who have captured two officers, demand Beth and Carol back. The exchange runs smoothly until Dawn demands that she needs Noah back. However, the group protests. Dawn claims she needs Noah because Beth took his place and she needs him back. Noah reluctantly agrees as does the group until Beth hugs him goodbye before turning to Dawn. She tells Dawn she "[gets] it now", that her act of kindness was a masquerade in order to keep Beth under her subservient order. Beth defiantly plunges a concealed pair of surgical scissors into Dawn's shoulder, causing Dawn to reflexively shoot her in the head by accident, and in turn prompting Daryl to kill Dawn in retaliation. Daryl lifts Beth's corpse and brings her out in time to see that the other survivors have returned, which include Maggie who breaks down in tears seeing Beth killed after only finding out she was alive.

In the episode "What Happened and What's Going On," Beth is one of the few characters to appear in Tyreese's hallucinations, caused from a loss of blood from a walker bite. Sitting behind Lizzie and Mika Samuels, she plays a guitar while singing a song, assuring Tyreese that he will be okay. In his final hallucination, Tyreese notices Beth driving the vehicle he's in, who assures him once more that everything will be okay before he dies from blood loss. In the episode "Forget," Sasha revisits Beth's death in one of her flashbacks.

=== Season 7 ===
Beth is briefly remembered by Rick in several flashbacks when confronted with the idea that his friends could be killed by Negan's men, while also mourning the losses of Abraham Ford and Glenn Rhee.

=== Season 9 ===
In Rick's final episode "What Comes After", Beth's voice is heard asking Rick, “What’s your wound?” during a lucid dream state. In a later hallucination, Beth's corpse appears alongside the corpses of Rick's friends and allies, both living and dead.

=== Season 10 ===
Although Beth does not make a physical appearance in season 10, a painting of the character can be seen in the Barrington House as part of a shrine built by Maggie in the episode "Morning Star." In the episode "Home Sweet Home," Maggie comforts Kelly by telling her a story about her sister, and later Daryl.

=== Season 11 ===
In the episodes "A New Deal" and "Outpost 22," Beth is seen in the form of flashbacks while Judith recalls prominent stories from her friend's pasts. In the episode "Rest in Peace," Beth is remembered by both Rick and Michonne Grimes when recalling both the living and the dead.

=== The Walking Dead: Dead City ===
==== Season 1 ====
Beth appears in the form of photographs in The Walking Dead: Dead City. Several years after defeating the Commonwealth, Maggie and Negan reside in a deserted New York. At one point, Maggie goes through an old box consisting of photos of her family, with several of the photographs including Beth.

==== Season 3 ====
Beth appears in an alternate reality in the episode "Genesis." In this reality, the zombie apocalypse never happened, and Beth is still alive and well. Following the deaths of her parents and brother Shawn, Beth moved to Manhattan to pursue her dreams of becoming a singer, working at the farm, the bar owned by Mason Dillard and frequented by Negan in the apocalyptic world. Her neighbor is Luis, Maggie's friend and possible love interest in post-apocalyptic Manhattan.

Maggie visits Beth at Christmas, revealing a plan that she has to save their struggling family farm. In contrast, Beth encourages Maggie to sell the farm and pursue her dreams.

After meeting Negan, Maggie aborts her plans to fly back home that night and attends Beth's show. Beth dedicates one of her songs to Maggie and they later sing together. To Beth's delight, Maggie initially decides to sell the farm, but changes her mind after getting a call that her co-op plan is possible.

== In other media ==
Beth Greene has been featured in several spin-offs, video games, and other works outside The Walking Dead television universe. The character is featured in the 2015 mobile game The Walking Dead: No Man's Land as a playable character. Beth is also featured as a playable character in The Walking Dead: Our World, which utilities her appearance from season 4. Both video games use archive footage of Emily Kinney from the television series. In 2023, Beth was featured as a main character in The Walking Dead: Destinies, which focuses on a retelling of the show's first four seasons. In the game, Emily Kinney reprises her role as the character.

For merchandise, several trading cards depicting the character have been released over the years, manufactured by Topps, Crytpozoic, and Rittenhouse Archives. Based on her season 5 appearance, Beth received a collectible statue by Eaglemoss in 2015. In 2016, McFarlane Toys based an action figure on her appearance in the season 4 episode "Alone." A vinyl Mystery Mini figure by Funko depicting a hospitalized and scarred Beth was released in 2016, with a rarity ratio of 1/36.

== Development and reception ==
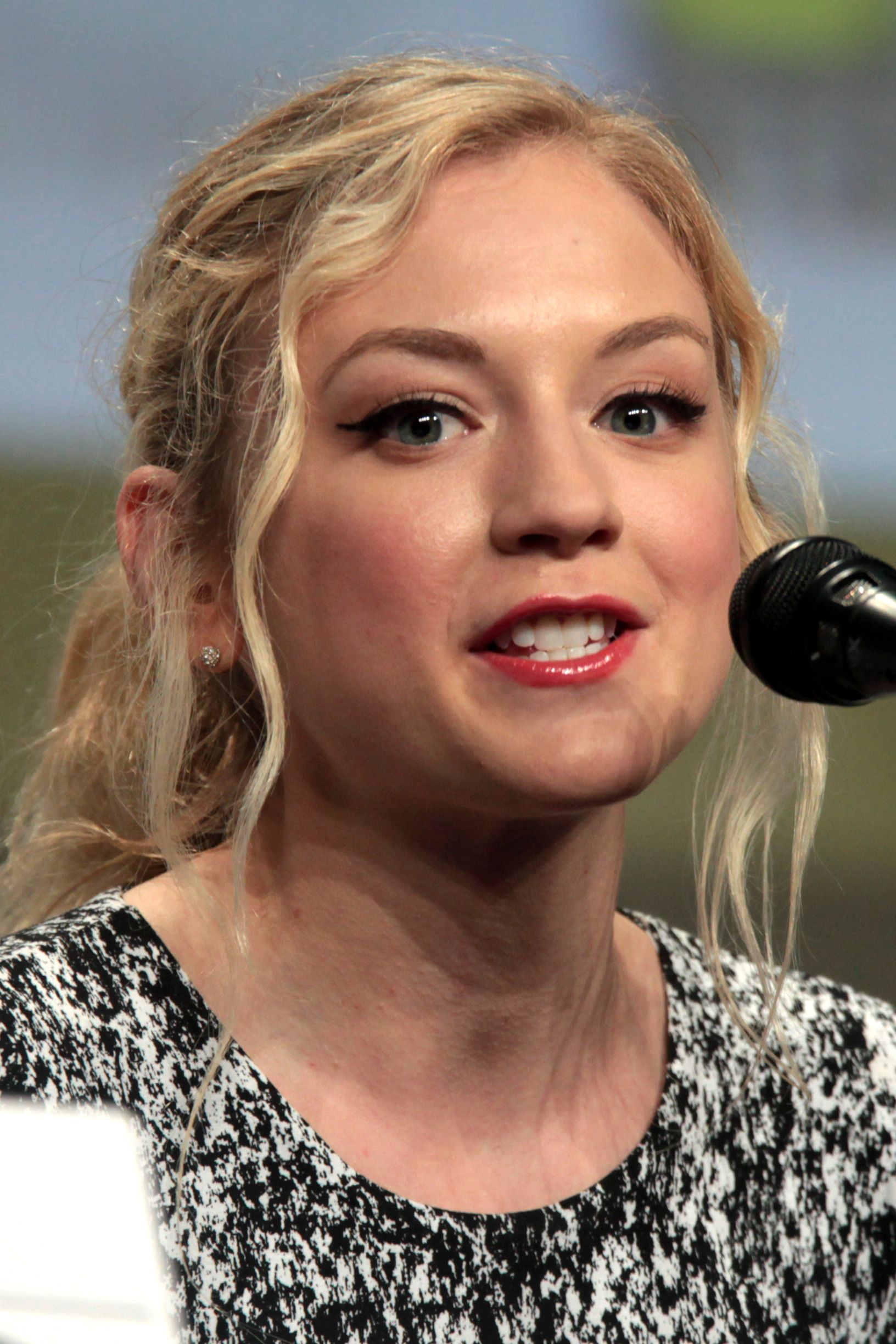
Emily Kinney (pictured in 2014) portrayed Beth in the TV series.

Emily Kinney was cast as a recurring character in Season 2 of The Walking Dead, where she portrayed Beth Greene. Beth is introduced as the 16-year-old sister of Maggie Greene, while Kinney was 25 years old at the time of casting. The second-season episode "18 Miles Out" deals with the aftermath of Beth's suicide attempt. IGN's Eric Goldman commended the development presented in the episode; "While there's no denying that Beth was pretty much a non-entity until this episode, I did like a lot of her material here with Maggie—especially when Maggie said she couldn't handle another funeral and Beth told her, 'You can't avoid it,' which is of course a very sad, very true statement, given the circumstances they're in." Gary Roszko of The Huffington Post affirmed that Beth's interactions with Lori were clichéd, comparing it to "an after school anti-suicide special". New York's Starlee Kine was much more pessimistic about the storyline than the general consensus and assailed the melodramatic nature of it. "We just aren’t going to care about the potential death of a character we don’t know," she iterated. "Or if it refused to learn that lesson, maybe it could’ve then learned this one: We are very tired of watching survivors of a still undefined and non-wondered-about apocalypse talk other survivors into not giving up."

After being on the show for two years, Kinney received a promotion to series regular for season 4, along with Chad Coleman and Sonequa Martin-Green. The fourth-season episode "Still," which focuses only on Beth and Daryl, garnered praise in particular from television commentators, with viewers of the series having shipped Beth and Daryl as a couple. Writing for IGN, Roth Cornet commended the "Still" episode, stating that "Daryl and Beth revealed themselves to be more perfect a fit than any of the other combinations" and that "[t]hey brought out a raw honesty in one another that yielded what were some of the most grounded and engaging character moments of the season. They are two sides of a coin, and that's not something that had been entirely clear prior to this entry." She additionally commented positively on Kinney's acting, saying it was: "...the strongest acting we've seen from Emily Kinney, particularly in that final exchange on the porch." Kinney said that the show was never clear on whether Beth and Daryl had a romantic or brother-sisterly connection, but that "it was a situation where they were getting to know each other. First, they were just trying to get along" because they did not see "each other's point of view very well" and, later, "as the story went along they maybe became friends" and "it started to sort of go, 'Oh, what more could this be? Could it keep going into something else?'" In his review for Grantland praising the fifth season as a whole, Andy Greenwald had particular praise for the characters of Beth and Tyreese, citing their newly established complexities and character evolution in the fifth season.

Regarding Beth's death, critics agree that Dawn did not intentionally shoot her, and that it was rather an accident or a matter of reflex, commenting on Dawn's surprised expression at the trigger having been activated. Alan Sepinwall of HitFix stated that because the season had mostly neglected that Maggie and Beth are sisters, Beth's death in "Coda" does not have the emotional impact it could have when Maggie breaks down in grief at the sight of Beth's lifeless body. Matt Fowler of IGN said that although Beth's death was predictable, it "felt like a big moment and it's always wrenching to see other characters react to the death of their loved ones" and that although he liked Beth, he "still mostly felt bad about her death because Daryl and Maggie (who seemed to have to be reminded this week that Beth being gone at all was a topic she should care about) felt bad about it." Fowler ultimately gave the episode a 7.6 out of 10. Kinney said she understood Maggie not expressing much concern about Beth's whereabouts because it is "a world where they're losing people a lot. And if you're going to survive, you can't sit around mourning for very long," and that Maggie likely had unseen moments where she worried about Beth. Zach Handlen of The A.V. Club stated that the episode ends in "a shocking finale which reminds us that, whatever else it's learned, the show still hasn't given up on its most beloved trick: killing people because it can. Beth's sudden death was a shock, no question, although I imagine some viewers were expecting just such a gut-punch."

Rob Bricken, writing for io9, commented negatively on Beth's death. He criticized the deaths of Dawn and Beth as a "wasted opportunity", citing the "childish, ridiculous logic" Dawn had for demanding Noah back even though she had "zero leverage", and Beth's "inexplicable, dumb decision" to stab Dawn in the shoulder. He wondered:

So what the hell was [Beth] trying to do? Get Dawn killed indirectly? Free the hospital from her idiotic non-control? Commit suicide by idiot? Whatever she was trying to accomplish — presumably getting rid of Dawn in some manner — weren't there many, many other ways to do it that didn't involve her almost certainly getting shot or potentially turning the hostage trade into a bloodbath? We'll never know, because Beth is dead.

For her performance as Beth in the fifth season, Kinney was nominated in 2015 for the Saturn Award for Best Supporting Actress on Television.

== Legacy ==
On 18 September 2026, Emily Kinney released the extended play, I Cried When You Died, which is based off her time on the show, and the character of Beth. It consists of five songs, four of which are covers from the show that she performed as the character. The EP is also named after responses Kinney gets from fans in regards to her character's death on the show.
