= Wyble =

Wyble is a surname. Notable people with the surname include:

- Jimmy Wyble (1922–2010), American guitarist
- Teri Wyble, American actress

== See also ==
- WIBL
- WYBL
