= Slabtown (The Walking Dead) =

- The Walking Dead episode
- Beth meets Officer Dawn Lerner after waking up in the hospital.
- Episode no.: Season 5 Episode 4
- Directed by: Michael E. Satrazemis
- Written by: Matthew Negrete; Channing Powell
- Cinematography by: Stephen Campbell
- Editing by: Avi Youabian
- Original air date: November 2, 2014

Guest appearances
- Christine Woods as Officer Dawn Lerner; Keisha Castle-Hughes as Joan; Tyler James Williams as Noah; Cullen Moss as Officer Gorman; Erik Jensen as Dr. Steven Edwards; Ricky Wayne as Officer O'Donnell; Teri Wyble as Officer Shepherd

Episode chronology
← Previous "Four Walls and a Roof"	Next → "Self Help"
- The Walking Dead season 5

"Slabtown" is the fourth episode of the fifth season of the post-apocalyptic horror television series The Walking Dead, which aired on AMC on November 2, 2014. The episode was written by Matthew Negrete and Channing Powell and directed by Michael E. Satrazemis, who is the series' director of photography. In the episode, Beth Greene (Emily Kinney) finds herself in an operational hospital in Atlanta after being abducted in the previous season. Beth discovers that the hospital is ruled by a brutally enforced system and slowly plans her escape. Emily Kinney and Melissa McBride are the only regulars to appear in this episode. McBride appears only in the final scene, whereas Kinney appears throughout the episode.

== Plot ==
Beth awakens at Grady Memorial Hospital and is greeted by former APD Lt. Dawn Lerner (Christine Woods) and Dr. Steven Edwards (Erik Jensen). They tell Beth they saved her from walkers and that she must repay them with labor. Beth is assigned to Dr. Edwards as a nurse. They tend to Gavin (Timothy Scott), whom Edwards writes off as a lost cause. Dawn insists that Edwards tries to save him, but he fails to regain consciousness. Dawn slaps Beth in a fit of rage.

Beth and Dr. Edwards treat Joan (Keisha Castle-Hughes), who was bitten while attempting to escape the hospital. They amputate Joan's arm despite her pleas to die. Beth meets Noah (Tyler James Williams), another ward who warns Beth that Dawn and her officers never allow wards to leave. He confides that he plans to escape and return to his community in Richmond. Joan warns Beth that Dawn allows her officers to rape the wards to keep their loyalty and morale high.

Edwards stops officer Gorman from sexually harassing Beth. He explains to Beth that, after the bombing of Atlanta, (Note: As depicted in Chupacabra.) the officers and staff took shelter in the hospital. When they ran out of food and were forced to scavenge, they began healing injured survivors for labor. Edwards has Beth inject Gavin, who is on life support, with Clozapine, which kills him. Dawn demands to know what happened, and Noah takes the blame, causing him to be beaten by the officers. Edwards reveals to Beth that he purposefully had her inject Gavin with a fatal dose of Clonazepam. Dawn warns Beth that she knew Noah was lying, but made an example of him, and that Beth isn't strong enough for this world.

The next day, Beth and Noah plan to escape the hospital via the elevator shaft to the basement. Beth retrieves a key from Dawn's office, where she finds Joan's corpse, having died by suicide. Gorman catches Beth and offers his silence in exchange for sex. Beth smashes a jar over Gorman's head, knocking him out and getting him devoured by a reanimated Joan. Beth and Noah tie blankets to rappel down the shaft. Noah goes first but is attacked by a walker, causing him to fall and injure his leg. Noah is able to escape, but Beth is recaptured by the officers.

Dawn confronts Beth about the deaths of Joan and Gorman. Beth tells Dawn that the two deaths were the result of the hospital's corrupt regime and that nobody is coming to rescue them. Dawn strikes Beth in anger. Later, while Dr. Edwards treats her injuries, Beth reveals that she discovered Gavin was a doctor. Dr. Edwards admits he knew Gavin, and he arranged his death in an attempt to remain indispensable to Dawn, ensuring his own survival. Appalled, Beth later obtains a pair of scissors with the intention of killing Dr. Edwards, but she is stopped in her tracks when a gurney carrying an unconscious Carol is brought into the hospital.

== Reception ==
Upon airing, the episode was watched by 14.518 million American viewers with an 18-49 rating of 7.6, an increase in viewership from the previous week, which had 13.801 million viewers and an 18-49 rating of 7.0.

In the United Kingdom, the episode was viewed by 1.218 million viewers, making it the highest-rated broadcast that week. It also received 0.102 million timeshift viewers. In Australia, it received 0.090 million viewers, making it the highest-rated cable broadcast that day.

The episode received generally positive reviews from critics. Matt Fowler of IGN gave the episode a 7.7 out of 10, saying: "As someone who actually enjoyed The Governor's two-episode diversion last season (while still realizing it was the show course-correcting in order to lead back to a legit prison battle), and also as someone who likes Beth, "Slabtown" was a bit of a drag. Not fully. There was some good stuff here. But it definitely was a hard comedown after the cannibal saga. So much so that it had me wondering (almost) the entire time what this new group's sinister secret was. And the truth, when revealed, wasn't really all that dark or exciting considering what we've already seen on this season."
