= Dawn Lerner =

Fictional character in The Walking Dead TV series; detective

- The Walking Dead character
- Dawn, as portrayed by Christine Woods in the television series.
- First appearance: "Slabtown" (2014)
- Last appearance: "Coda" (2014)
- Created by: Scott M. Gimple; Matthew Negrete; Channing Powell
- Portrayed by: Christine Woods

In-universe information
- Occupation: Police Officer; Leader of Grady Memorial Hospital

Lt. Dawn Lerner is a fictional character from the American television series The Walking Dead portrayed by Christine Woods. She is an original character to the show and has no counterpart in the comic book series of the same name.

== Television series ==
=== Fictional character biography ===
==== Season 5 ====
In the episode "Slabtown", officer Dawn Lerner and doctor Steven Edwards introduce themselves to Beth when she wakes up in Grady Memorial Hospital. Dawn explains that her officers found Beth unconscious on the side of a road, surrounded by "rotters", and they saved her life. Dawn tells Beth that as a rule of the hospital, she must repay them with labor, and assigns Beth to Dr. Edwards as a nurse. She and Dr. Edwards are called to tend to a new patient, Gavin. Dr. Edwards immediately writes Gavin off as a lost cause, but Dawn insists he try to save him. Later, Beth and Dr. Edwards must treat a worker, Joan, who was bitten while attempting to escape the hospital. Despite Joan's pleas to be allowed to die, Dawn orders Dr. Edwards to amputate Joan's arm to prevent the infection from spreading. Dr. Edwards tells Beth to give Gavin a dose of Clozapine, an atypical antipsychotic, which kills him. An angry Dawn demands to know what happened, and Noah lies and takes the blame. Dawn has Noah beaten as a punishment. Dawn later warns Beth that she knew Noah was lying, but was forced to make an example of him for the greater good. Dawn later confronts Beth after the escape of Noah and the deaths of Joan and Gorman. Beth tells Dawn that the two deaths were the result of the hospital's corrupt regime, and that nobody is coming to rescue them. Dawn strikes Beth in anger.

In the episode "Crossed", Dawn is in a heated discussion with officer O'Donnell over their inability to find Noah. Beth listens in as the subject turns to Carol, who had been hit by a car and brought to the hospital. O'Donnell feels she is a lost cause, and keeping her alive is waste of resources. Beth intervenes, and an angry Dawn instructs the O'Donnell to take Carol off life support. When O'Donnell leaves, Dawn chastises Beth for forcing her hand, but gives her the key to the drug locker so she can save Carol. Dawn admits that she respects her, as Beth shows a strength Dawn didn't think she possessed.

In the episode "Coda", order starts to break down when officers Lamson, Shepherd, and Licari (who have been taken captive by Rick's group) fail to respond to Dawn's attempts to communicate with them, and others soon begin to lose faith in Dawn's leadership. Officer O'Donnell confronts Dawn, threatening to remove her as leader. The two get into a fight, and Beth pushes O'Donnell into the elevator shaft to fall to his death. Beth later accuses Dawn of manipulating her into eliminating Gorman and O'Donnell, who were threats to Dawn's position, and again vows to escape. Dawn denies the accusation, and promises to remember Beth's support. After Rick proposes the trade of Shepherd and Licari for Beth and Carol to two other officers, Rick's group meets Dawn and her officers at the hospital. As Beth packs up, she hides a pair of scissors in her cast. The trade initially goes smoothly, but Dawn adds a condition at the last second, demanding Rick to hand over Noah. Rick and Beth are reluctant, but Noah agrees so as to prevent bloodshed. Beth goes to give him a hug, but as she does so, Dawn makes a gloating comment in reference to her earlier conversation with Beth. Angered, Beth faces Dawn and icily tells her "I get it now." With that, Beth stabs her in the shoulder using the scissors. Caught off guard, Dawn reflexively fires her gun straight into Beth's head, killing her instantly. Despite her own shock and pleas for mercy, a distraught Daryl immediately pulls out his own gun and shoots Dawn in the head, killing her as well.

== Development and reception ==
Zack Handlen of The A.V. Club found Dawn "irritating", and said, "nothing in the performance or script stops her from being a one-note irritant."

Kelsea Stahler of Bustle felt that killing Dawn in the episode "Coda" wasted "a perfectly good season 5 villain", which represented a "missed opportunity" to have a female character be the "big bad" and to have the narrative for the rest of the season be based on a conflict between two women (Dawn and Beth). Rob Bricken of io9, in addition to calling the plot one of the "worst of season 5" and the story "more laughable than moving", also criticized the deaths of Dawn and Beth as a "wasted opportunity". He cited the "childish, ridiculous logic" Dawn had for demanding Noah back even though she had "zero leverage" and Beth's "inexplicable, dumb decision" to stab Dawn in the shoulder. He wondered:

So what the hell was [Beth] trying to do? Get Dawn killed indirectly? Free the hospital from her idiotic non-control? Commit suicide by idiot? Whatever she was trying to accomplish — presumably getting rid of Dawn in some manner — weren't there many, many other ways to do it that didn't involve her almost certainly getting shot or potentially turning the hostage trade into a bloodbath? We'll never know, because Beth is dead.

Noel Murray of Rolling Stone ranked Dawn Lerner 30th in a list of 30 best Walking Dead characters, saying, "As played by Christine Woods, Officer Dawn was not outright evil – she was just ice-cold by necessity. If she hadn't reflexively shot poor Beth in the head, she might still be the Queen of Atlanta today."
