= Glenn Rhee =

Fictional character from The Walking Dead

Glenn
- The Walking Dead character
- From left to right: Glenn, as he appears in the comic book series, television series (portrayed by Steven Yeun) and video game series.
- First appearance: Comic: "Issue #1" (2003); Television: "Days Gone Bye" (2010); Video game: "A New Day" (2012)
- Last appearance: Comic: "Issue #101" (2012); Television: "Rest in Peace" (2022)
- Created by: Robert Kirkman; Tony Moore
- Adapted by: Frank Darabont (The Walking Dead)
- Portrayed by: Steven Yeun
- Voiced by: Nick Herman (video game)

In-universe information
- Occupation: Pizza delivery guy Supply Runner for the Atlanta Camp; Supply Runner for the Alexandria Safe-Zone; Comic: College student Car thief Television: Supply Runner for the prison Video game: Supply Runner of the Motel Survivors
- Family: Hershel Greene (father-in-law); Billy Greene (brother-in-law); Lacey Greene (sister-in-law); Arnold Greene (brother-in-law); Susie Green (sister-in-law); Rachel Greene (sister-in-law); Shawn Greene (brother-in-law); Hershel Rhee (son); Television: Josephine Greene (mother-in-law); Annette Greene (stepmother-in-law); Beth Greene (sister-in-law); Shawn Greene (stepbrother-in-law); Arnold Greene (cousin-in-law)
- Spouse: Maggie Greene (Girlfriend later wife)
- Children: Television: Hershel Rhee (son)‘ Enid Rhee (adoptive-daughter); Comic: Sophia (adopted daughter); Carl Grimes (adoptive son-in-law); Hershel (son)

Glenn (full name in the television series: Glenn Rhee) is a fictional character from the comic book series The Walking Dead. He was portrayed by Steven Yeun in the television series of the same name and voiced by Nick Herman in the video game of the same name.

In both forms of media, Glenn is a young pizza delivery boy from Atlanta who is separated from his family after the zombie outbreak and joins a group of survivors led by Rick Grimes. Glenn is known for being quick thinking and resourceful, which makes him the group's primary supply runner. As the group begins to move around the region looking for sanctuary, Glenn meets Maggie Greene and they fall in love. Their relationship is tested in numerous ways throughout the course of the series as their humanity is challenged in the face of numerous threats, including hostile survivors the group comes into contact with. They eventually marry and have a child, although Glenn is killed by Negan before the child is born.

The character of Glenn was acclaimed and a fan-favorite. Yeun's performance was praised, and many fans have expressed that Glenn's death was a turning point in the quality of the show.

== Appearances ==
=== Comic book series ===
Resourceful and clever, Glenn makes it out of Atlanta and comes up on the group of survivors on the outer limits of the city. Due to his knack for scavenging, he is often nominated to sneak into the city and find supplies. On one of these runs, he finds Rick Grimes and brings him back to the group, reuniting them with his family. His use of MacGyver-like tactics to outsmart and kill walkers enabled him to successfully recover guns for Jim, another of the group's members. Glenn develops a nascent crush on Maggie, but his shyness initially prevents him from acting on his feelings. Maggie eventually realizes this and confronts Glenn about his feelings and they start a relationship. After Maggie's father Hershel catches him in bed with Maggie, Glenn and Hershel have a brief argument. Despite the rocky start, Hershel understands that he cannot stop his daughter from wanting to be with Glenn. While Hershel kicks the majority of the survivors out, he accepts Glenn's decision to stay with Maggie.

Glenn tests a new idea of how to clear walkers on the fence: by attaching knives to plywood so it's easier to retrieve them after stabbing. When the group tries to make a permanent home at the prison, he moves into the same cell as Maggie. Later on, Hershel gives Maggie permission to be in a relationship with Glenn, and helps him settle into a prison-turned-refuge with Maggie and helps the group find fuel and supplies. Glenn is later imprisoned by the Governor, an encounter that leaves him with physical and mental scars; Glenn is beaten and forced to hear the Governor brutally rape Michonne in a neighboring cell. After his escape and return to the prison, Glenn grows to love Maggie and proposed to her with a ring stolen from a zombie's finger; Hershel marries the couple shortly after. Soon after their marriage, Glenn and Maggie volunteer to join the group that traveled to the Army Center to prevent enemies from Woodbury from using its fuel for their vehicles. The group is attacked by Bruce and his friends. Glenn, distracted, allows Andrea to snipe Bruce, and Michonne to kill the rest of the attackers. He fiercely defends the prison from a front gate sniper tower. With the group divided on what to do next, Glenn decides to leave with Dale and Andrea in the R.V. at the last minute, saving Sophia and Maggie's lives (at this point, Sophia saw him as a surrogate father). He, Maggie, and Sophia stay at Hershel's farm with Dale and Andrea.

When the group encounters survivors at the farm, Glenn immediately mistrusts Abraham Ford, Rosita Espinosa, and Eugene Porter. However, he agrees to accompany them to Washington for Eugene's mission rather than stay at the farm any longer. On the road, Maggie attempts to hang herself and Glenn fought with Abraham, who intended to shoot her. Glenn cuts Maggie down and performs CPR, saving her life. Glenn's focus shifts from scavenging to caring for his new family and supporting Maggie after the death of her entire family. With the rest of the group, he travels to the Alexandria Safe-Zone. Glenn is suspicious of the Safe-Zone's community but adapts more rapidly than Rick. Glenn's skills and agility make him a suitable applicant to once again be a scavenger and a replacement for the wounded Scott. While the survivors stay in Father Gabriel Stokes' church, Glenn is caught in the center of conflict again when one of the Hunters, Albert, shoots him in the leg while he carries a mutilated Dale to safety. Gabriel and Eugene patch up Glenn's leg using a few tea-leaves and hot candle wax. Like the rest of the group, Glenn is pinned down in the church and remains behind while Abraham and the other leaders take care of them. He is unharmed during and in the aftermath, and his leg wound heals a few days afterwards.

Rick asks Glenn, due to his loyalty, to steal back their guns and weapons, which were taken by Douglas Monroe, when they first came to the Safety-zone. Glenn creates a distraction for the Community's survivors while he looks for the weapons. Rick and Glenn find the armory, and Glenn sneaks in. Rick distributes the weapons amongst the members of their group.

After the issues with Douglas are solved, Glenn and Maggie live in Alexandria for some time and decide that Alexandria would be the best place to raise a child, something they had wanted to do for some time. After a few attempts, Maggie gets pregnant.

However their celebration is short-lived; a group called the Saviors attempt to break into the community numerous times. During one such invasion, Glenn helps Eugene escape. Glenn and others go out and take on walkers coming towards the Alexandria gates. After Abraham is killed by Dwight, one of the Saviors, Glenn convinces Maggie to leave the community with him and Sophia, and head toward the Hilltop Colony, which he believes to be a much safer place. As they are camped on the road resting for the night after driving halfway to the Hilltop, Rick says goodbye to Glenn, and states that he is happy for him. They are ambushed by the Saviors soon afterward. The leader of the Saviors, Negan, selects Glenn to die as "punishment" for the Saviors Rick's group killed; he then bludgeons Glenn to death with a baseball bat. Glenn dies while helplessly crying Maggie's name. Rick and everyone else are left with Glenn's mangled corpse as the Saviors drive away, with Rick swearing to avenge Glenn's death.

His death initially leaves the group shattered, with Maggie quickly descending into an emotional mess and Rick on the verge of yielding to Negan's power. Glenn's body is later driven by the group to the Hilltop, where it is buried in a matter of days. To honor Glenn's final wishes, Maggie chooses to remain at the Hilltop with Sophia and start a new life while awaiting their baby.

=== Television series ===
Glenn's parents were originally from Korea. Glenn grew up in Michigan with several sisters and moved to Atlanta. He worked as a pizza delivery boy, giving him in depth knowledge of Atlanta's layout. When the outbreak occurred, Glenn encountered another survivor named T-Dog (Theodore Douglas) and the two escaped Atlanta together and took refuge in a camp outside of the city led by Shane Walsh.

==== Season 1 ====
In the series premiere episode "Days Gone Bye", Glenn's voice is first heard using a radio to talk to Rick when Rick is hiding in a tank in the city of Atlanta. In the episode "Guts", Glenn uses the radio to rescue Rick from the horde of walkers surrounding the tank, and guides Rick to the location of his group, which consists of Andrea, T-Dog, Merle Dixon, Jacqui, and Morales, hiding in a department store. The noise made by Rick as he and Glenn flee the horde draws the walkers to the store and the group finds themselves trapped inside. As the walkers try to break through the plate glass doors of the store, Rick decides to try to reach a box truck at a nearby construction site. To reach the truck, he and Glenn cover themselves in the blood and viscera of a dispatched walker, allowing them to successfully pass among the walkers, until a brief rainstorm washes off enough of the blood scent that they begin to draw attention. They make a break for the construction site, and Rick is able to reach the box truck. Glenn drives a Dodge Challenger, its alarm blaring, to draw the attention of the walkers away from the store, while Rick drives the box truck to one of the store's cargo doors. The entire group (other than Merle, who is trapped on the roof of the store) is able to escape the city in the box truck, apart from Glenn, who drives away in the Challenger. Glenn races down the highway in his new Challenger and heads back to his group with Rick and his new group following behind in the box truck. In the episode "Tell It to the Frogs", they meet up with the rest of the survivors at the Atlanta campsite, where Glenn helps distribute supplies and assist others when needed. He later goes with Rick, Daryl, and T-Dog to find Merle in the city and help Rick regain the guns previously dropped near the tank. In the episode "Vatos", Glenn ends up getting kidnapped by a nursing home crew posing as gang bangers, who try to exchange him for weaponry. Glenn is released, but his group then finds out that the truck which they used to drive to the city is missing, leaving them with no choice but to return to the campsite on foot. Glenn and the rest of his teammates return to the camp just in time to witness a herd of walkers invade and kill many of the survivors. In the episode "Wildfire", in the wake of the massacre, he assists in dealing with the corpses and insists that the group bury their people instead of burning them as they did the walkers they previously killed. Ultimately, he and the rest of the group leave the campsite and head to the CDC. Along the way Jim, a survivor who was bitten during the attack and has been battling the fever, finally gives in and requests to be left to die by the trees nearby which Glenn tries to argue but the group ultimately goes with Jim's choice. In the episode "TS-19", for a brief time, they enjoy the luxuries the CDC offers. They are on the road again, however, following the self-destruction of the CDC building.

==== Season 2 ====
In the season premiere "What Lies Ahead," Glenn continues to be a valuable asset to the group, helping to repair the RV and scavenging items from abandoned cars on the highway. In the episode "Bloodletting," Glenn, Lori, Carol, Daryl, and Andrea continue to search near the highway for Carol's daughter Sophia. In the episode "Save the Last One," Glenn and T-Dog arrive at Hershel Greene's farm, where Carl is recovering from a gunshot wound. He sparks up a friendship with Hershel's daughter Maggie when she catches him praying for Carl. In the episode "Cherokee Rose," Glenn agrees to act as live bait to draw a trapped walker out of a well, but this goes badly and he almost falls into the well. Glenn and Maggie later decide to go into town to get supplies from a pharmacy, when Lori discreetly asks him to get her a pregnancy test as well. When Maggie asks him what he's looking for, he tries to make an excuse and accidentally grabs a box of condoms. Maggie then seduces him and they have sex. In the episode "Chupacabra," Glenn learns that Lori is pregnant, and she begs him not to tell Rick. Maggie expresses to Glenn that their fling was a one-time thing, but Glenn tries to convince her that their romance should continue. Later at dinner, Maggie slips Glenn a note under the table asking him where they can have another sexual encounter; Glenn writes an answer and returns the note. After the meal ends Maggie opens the note with Glenn's response saying that he will meet her in the barn outside. A horrified Maggie hurries outside and runs toward the barn, but she is unable to prevent Glenn from discovering that the locked building is full of walkers. In the episode "Secrets," Maggie begs Glenn not to tell the others about the barn, but he soon reveals this secret and Lori's pregnancy to Dale. Maggie feels frustrated and betrayed by Glenn when he does not keep his promise that he will not reveal that walkers are in the barn. She forgives him soon afterwards however, and they start to engage in a relationship. In the mid-season finale "Pretty Much Dead Already," Glenn tells the rest of the group about the barn, and Shane eventually breaks the barn open, leading Glenn and the other survivors to kill all of the walkers as they file out of the barn, including a now-zombified Sophia.

In the mid-season premiere "Nebraska," Hershel disappears after the incident at the barn. Before Glenn and Rick leave for town to find Maggie's father, Maggie tells Glenn she loves him. Glenn leaves before saying it back. They find Hershel in a bar and inform him that his youngest daughter, Beth, has collapsed and is in need of medical attention. They attempt to talk him into returning to the farm, but he refuses. Two men from another group, Dave and Tony, find them. An argument leads to a violent confrontation, and Rick kills the two men. In the episode "Triggerfinger," more armed men from Dave and Tony's group come looking for them, and they get into a shootout with Glenn, Rick, and Hershel. Glenn is wracked with embarrassment and guilt after freezing during the shootout with outsiders. They capture one of the attackers, named Randall, before they all return to the farm. Glenn blames his inaction in town on his deep love for Maggie, and apparently breaks up with her when they get back to the farm. In the episode "Judge, Jury, Executioner," Hershel gives Glenn a family heirloom, representing his approval of Glenn's relationship with Maggie. In the episode "Better Angels," when Randall apparently escapes, Rick, Shane, Daryl, and Glenn go on a manhunt for the fugitive; Shane leads Rick one direction while Daryl and Glenn comb another part of the woods. Glenn and Daryl find and kill Randall who has inexplicably reanimated from the dead as a walker despite no signs of a bite wound. In the season finale "Beside the Dying Fire," when the farm is overrun by walkers, Glenn plays a big part in its defense. During the chaos, he convinces Maggie to abandon the farmyard for the meantime so as to avoid any further danger. He later assures her that her family is safe, and seeing the right opportunity, confesses his love for her. The two eventually reunite with the other survivors at the highway. After discovering that Rick kept secret the fact that they are all infected, Glenn is among the survivors who grow wary of Rick. He and Maggie contemplate leaving camp and abandoning Rick's leadership. They, however, dismiss such thoughts after Rick taunts the group with the option of leaving on their own.

==== Season 3 ====
In the season premiere "Seed," six to seven months after leaving the farm, Glenn has become increasingly proficient at fighting walkers. He and Maggie continue to have a strong relationship. The group finds a prison and decides to make it their new home. While clearing out part of the prison, Glenn and Maggie get separated from Hershel and Hershel gets bitten by a walker, forcing Rick to cut Hershel's leg off below the knee to prevent the infection from spreading. In the episode "Sick," Glenn escorts Carol to the prison yard so that she can practice a C-section in preparation for Lori's delivery. In the episode "Killer Within," when Andrew lets walkers into the prison yard to attack the survivors, Glenn helps kill the walkers and stabilize the prison, but not before T-Dog and Lori are killed. In the episode "Say the Word," Glenn finds Rick losing control and pleads for him to stop, but Rick nearly assaults Glenn. In the episode "Hounded," while out on a supply run, Glenn and Maggie are ambushed and captured by Merle and brought to Woodbury for interrogation. In the episode "When the Dead Come Knocking," Merle brutally beats Glenn while trying to find the whereabouts of their camp. Despite this, as well as being forced to fight a walker while strapped to a chair and having the Governor threaten to shoot Maggie, Glenn remains unbroken. But when the Governor threatens to shoot Glenn, Maggie tells her about the prison and their group. In the mid-season finale "Made to Suffer," when Glenn and Maggie attempt to escape, the Governor orders Merle to execute them; they fight back and Merle's group is overwhelmed by Rick's group. Rick, Glenn, and Maggie escape over the wall, and meet up with Michonne.

In the mid-season premiere "The Suicide King," while Glenn remains behind, Rick and Maggie set off smoke grenades, killing several Woodbury residents and rescuing Merle and Daryl in the process. Glenn shows great frustration (at one point bludgeoning a walker pulled from a nearby vehicle) when he finds out that not only is Merle going with them, but Rick had not taken the opportunity to kill the Governor as well (still believing that he raped Maggie when they were held captive). They return to the prison without Merle and Daryl, but Glenn's relationship with Maggie begins to fall apart, despite her claims that the Governor threatened to cut off his hand if she refused to bow down to him. Rick has a breakdown while meeting Tyreese's group, and Glenn escorts them out of the room when Rick starts yelling. In the episode "Home," with Rick losing control of himself, Glenn decides to impose himself as leader of the group, thinking about killing the Governor when he will not be expecting it. As he leaves on a scouting mission, he misses an attack made on the prison by the Governor, which results in Axel's death and the destruction of the main security gates. In the episode "I Ain't a Judas," when Rick argues with Hershel about leaving the prison, Glenn agrees with Rick that they should stay and fight. In the episode "Arrow on the Doorpost," Merle wants to kill the Governor during his meeting with Rick, but Glenn gets into a brawl with Merle to keep him from leaving the prison. Glenn begins to let go of some of his anger, and his relationship with Maggie improves. In the episode "This Sorrowful Life," Glenn asks Hershel for his permission to marry Maggie, and Hershel gives Glenn his blessing. Glenn then asks Maggie to marry him, and she says yes. In the season finale "Welcome to the Tombs," the Governor launches his assault on the prison, but the group is prepared. Glenn and Maggie fight back while wearing riot gear. Later, when Rick returns with the survivors from Woodbury, and Glenn opens the prison gates for them.

==== Season 4 ====
In the season premiere "30 Days Without an Accident," Glenn and Maggie get a pregnancy scare and decides to go out on a run in her place. When he gets back to the prison, Maggie tells him she is not pregnant. In the episode "Infected," Glenn is seen shouting about walkers being in a cell block during an attack. He later meets with the rest of the prison council about what to do about a possible deadly viral outbreak, and they begin quarantining the sick. In the episode "Isolation," Glenn falls ill and is quarantined with the other sick prisoners. In the episode "Internment," despite their illness, Glenn and Sasha help Hershel treat the other survivors with the virus. Glenn falls unconscious and recovers after Hershel saves him. Bob returns from a supply run with antibiotics and administers them to Glenn. In the mid-season finale "Too Far Gone," when the Governor arrives and attacks the prison, Glenn is rescued by Maggie and gets separated from her once the bus leaves.

In the episode "Inmates," after the prison attack, Glenn wakes up and finds himself trapped in the prison after leaving the escape bus. He heads to his room and finds the photo he took of Maggie. He grabs his riot gear, assault rifle, and an alcohol bottle from a survivor and heads out. Along the way, he encounters Tara, a survivor of the attacking army. She explains that she was the reason behind this and has no need for living as she watched her sister and niece die. She also tells him about the death of Hershel, which leaves Glenn saddened. Glenn convinces her that they need each other to get out alive. Glenn throws the bottle at a nearby car to distract the walkers and he and Tara escape. Along the road, Tara mentions that The Governor told her that the prison group were bad people and she didn't believe him for one second. She then apologizes for everything. They both get attacked by walkers and Glenn passes out. As Tara kills the last zombie, a military truck pulls up and three people climb out: Abraham Ford, Eugene Porter, and Rosita Espinosa. In the episode "Claimed," Abraham convinces Tara to accompany them on their trek to Washington D.C. so Eugene can hopefully stop the virus and save the world, and they put an unconscious Glenn in the back of the truck. When Glenn wakes up, he bashes the back window until Abraham stops and gets out. Glenn insists on searching for Maggie, but when Abraham insists that Maggie is dead the two men brawl. The commotion draws walkers, and when Eugene tries to shoot them he accidentally cripples their vehicle. Glenn takes this as a sign that he should find Maggie and Tara decides to go with them, then Rosita follows and Eugene tells Abraham that they should go along until they can find a new vehicle. In the episode "Alone," Glenn discovers a sign leading to Terminus. In the episode "Us," the group begins to see signs from Maggie that they should go to Terminus and when the group comes to a tunnel, Abraham can't bring himself to risk Eugene's life and they part ways, leaving Glenn and Tara to go through the tunnel alone. They come across the dead wandering around an area in the tunnel that has collapsed and while sneaking around them, Tara falls down the debris and is trapped. Glenn refuses to leave her and begins beating off the walkers, when they are rescued by Maggie, Sasha, Bob, Eugene, Abraham and Rosita. Reunited with Maggie, they all decide to continue to Terminus where they meet with the refugees. In the season finale "A," it is revealed that they have been imprisoned in a railroad car when Rick and his group are also imprisoned in the same car.

==== Season 5 ====
In the season premiere "No Sanctuary," Glenn and the others create makeshift weapons to fight off their captors, but the Terminus guards instead drop a flashbang grenade into the boxcar, and drag Glenn, Rick, Daryl, and Bob out. They are taken to the slaughterhouse and lined up bending over a pig trough next where four other male survivors are brutally slaughtered over the pig trough but just as Glenn is next Gareth walks in and questions one of the guards about the survivors. An explosion caused by Carol distracts Gareth and allows Rick to break free from his cuffs, kill the guards, then set Glenn, Daryl and Bob free. The four soon discover that the people of Terminus are cannibals and Rick orders everyone shot on sight. They make their way back to the boxcar and free their friends as they fight their way out. As Glenn tries to oppose Rick's plan to go back they are reunited with Carol, Tyreese and Judith and move on. In the episode "Strangers," the group hear screams for help. They go and assist the man from a group of walkers. He introduces himself as Gabriel. He takes the survivors back to his church, which they quickly check is secure and not a trap. It's then decided that the group will need to go and fetch supplies. Glenn goes with Maggie and Tara to scavenge a weapons store, where he finds three silencers in a mini fridge. The group celebrate as Abraham makes a toast. In the episode "Four Walls and a Roof," the group discover Bob was captured by the cannibals of Terminus and is being used as bait, having been eaten on the leg. Bob reveals he is bitten, to which Glenn reminds to Rick that Jim had lasted two days before turning. When Abraham announces that he's taking Eugene and leaving to ensure his survival, an argument breaks out between him and Rick when he insists on taking the bus. Glenn manages to stop the argument by promising Abraham that if he stays for one more night to help deal with Gareth and the Hunters, then he and Maggie will leave with Abraham on the church bus the following morning. Abraham reluctantly agrees. Glenn says goodbye to Bob before he leaves to go to Washington with Maggie, Tara, Abraham, Eugene, and Rosita.

In the episode "Self Help," on their journey to DC, the bus crashes and the survivors face multiple walker problems including a herd consisting of thousands which Abraham tries to insist they go through despite Glenn attempting to reason with him. Eugene reveals he crashed the bus and admits that he lied about the cure, Glenn is stunned by the revelation and Abraham reacts in rage and violently punches Eugene and Glenn and Rosita try to stop him as they attempt to wake up Eugene. In the episode "Crossed," Glenn, Tara and Rosita bond as Maggie watches over Eugene and Abraham, as Eugene is unconscious after his beating and Abraham is unresponsive. In the mid-season finale "Coda," the group return to the church to discover Beth is alive and at Grady Memorial Hospital in Atlanta. The group travel to Atlanta, but are too late, as Beth has been killed and arrive in time to see a distraught Daryl carrying her body out and Glenn is left comforting a broken Maggie.

In the mid-season premiere "What Happened and What's Going On," two weeks after Beth's death the group is heading to Richmond, Virginia to find Noah's refuge following Rick's desire to fulfill Beth's last wish. However Glenn is doubtful that Noah's sanctuary is still there and his suspicions are proven true as they find the sanctuary in ruin and he and Rick start debating the logic in searching, and Beth's fate at Dawn's hand. Rick states he knew Dawn didn't mean to do it but would have killed her anyway if Daryl hadn't and Glenn noted that it wouldn't make a difference, making Michonne concerned about them debating killing someone makes her want to stop running and find a place to live. She later presses this when they find walker limbs, cut up, and insists on Washington again but Glenn is doubtful as Eugene was lying but Rick decides to take a chance. Later Glenn helps Michonne cut off Tyreese's arm when he is bitten and tries to haul him to safety, briefly being delayed by a truck opening and letting out numerous walker bodies with no arms and legs with "w"s cut into their foreheads, but Tyreese dies from blood loss and Glenn stands over his service. In the episode "Them," Glenn tries to comfort a grieving Maggie, still distraught over Beth's death, after she begins to doubt if she wants to live anymore. Glenn is also the sole member of the group with water during the drought and tries to make at least one member of the group drink some and later helps defend the barn they're staying in from a walker herd. In the episode "The Distance," when Maggie and Sasha bring in a stranger named Aaron who claims to have a community of good people nearby and wants them to join, Glenn leads a small group of Michonne, Maggie, Abraham and Rosita to investigate his claim of nearby cars. After learning he was telling to truth of the cars the group takes off at night to avoid suspicion but when they get paranoid about Aaron again they are forced to drive through a herd of walkers and escape on foot. However Glenn begins to trust Aaron again when they meet his boyfriend Eric, confirming his earlier claim there was only one person with him and begs Rick to do so as well. Later when the R.V. breaks down Glenn shows an angry Abraham where to find another battery to which he says" how'd you know those were there?" and Glenn just smiles, referencing Dale's teachings. Eventually the group arrives at Aaron's community the Alexandria Safe-Zone. In the episode "Remember," Glenn and the others are interviewed by Deanna Monroe, Alexandria's leader, and he admits the sense of brutality he has developed from being in the world for too long and how he needs to make it work and Deanna offers Glenn the job of supply runner. When the group is given two houses to divide among themselves they decide to sleep all together in one house to be cautious and the next day Glenn, Tara and Noah accompany Deanna's son Adien and his friend Nicholas on a run but learn they've strung a walker up as a warning and they try to reattach it which Glenn kills before it can kill Tara which enrages Adien. Once back at the safe zone Glenn provokes Aiden into fighting him until Rick and Deanna break it up and Deanna addresses the community to accept the group and personally thanks Glenn for knocking Aiden "on his ass."

In the episode "Forget," Glenn appears at the party at Deanna's house, where he assures Noah that he is family now. In the episode "Spend," Glenn, Noah, Tara, Eugene, Aiden, and Nicholas head to a warehouse to scavenge parts to repair Alexandria's solar power system. As they approach the warehouse, they find that the front area is infested with walkers, though a cage prevents them from being able to enter. As the group enters, they encounter a zombified soldier wearing body armor. Despite Glenn's pleas not to shoot it, Aiden fires at the walker several times and hits one of its grenades, causing an explosion. Tara is critically wounded, and Aiden is apparently killed. The explosion also weakens the cage, allowing walkers to enter the warehouse. The group falls back, only to discover Aiden is still alive, but impaled by two pieces of metal. As Glenn, Noah, and Nicholas go to save Aiden, Eugene carries Tara out of the warehouse. With the walkers closing in, Nicholas panics and flees, forcing Glenn and Noah to abandon Aiden, who is eaten alive by walkers. Glenn, Noah, and Nicholas take shelter inside a revolving door, but are trapped by walkers on both sides. Eugene arrives in the van and lures the walkers on the outside away. However, Nicholas pushes his way out, leaving Glenn and Noah vulnerable. The walkers grab Noah and tear him apart as Glenn watches in horror. Nicholas goes to the van and tells Eugene they must leave immediately. When Eugene refuses, Nicholas pulls him out of the van and tries to leave without him. Glenn arrives and knocks Nicholas out. Glenn then proceeds to put him in the van, instead of leaving him behind. In the episode "Try," Glenn relates the true series of events to Rick. Deanna bans Glenn and Nicholas from the armory and leaving the Safe-Zone while she investigates. Glenn confronts Nicholas and tells him men like him should have died to the walkers, but he was lucky Alexandria's walls came up. Glenn threatens Nicholas, warning him never to set foot outside of the walls again. In the season finale "Conquer," Glenn sees Nicholas climbing over the wall and grows suspicious and follows him out. While tracking him, Glenn is shot and wounded by Nicholas. Glenn manages to escape, and later attacks Nicholas when he is off-guard. A struggle ensues and Nicholas manages to escape, leaving Glenn to defend himself against walkers they attracted. As Nicholas tries to escape, Glenn tracks him down and holds him at gunpoint. Nicholas begs for his life, and Glenn spares him.

==== Season 6 ====
In the season premiere "First Time Again," Glenn first appears in a flashback. In a flashback Glenn and Nicholas show at the infirmary both bloody and bruised from their fight in the woods. Glenn is patched up by Rosita and Maggie asks him what happened. Glenn tells her that walkers attacked him and Nicholas in the woods and Glenn was accidentally hit by a bullet that ricocheted off of a tree and hit him in the shoulder. Glenn later appears at Rick's meeting where they discuss how to get rid of the walker herd in the quarry. Glenn tells Maggie that she should stay in Alexandria and watch over Deanna who is still devastated over the deaths of Aiden and Reg. Maggie tells Glenn that's not the only reason he wants her to stay and Glenn acknowledges this. Glenn notices Nicholas and looks at him in disapproval. Nicholas raises his hand and says he wants to help Rick with the plan as they are going to need all help he can get. After Glenn sees this he offers to go too likely to watch Nicholas. Glenn later appears with he and Nicholas helping to build the wall to lure the walkers away. Glenn notices Maggie and Tara hugging which he smiles at. Glenn and Nicholas are later seen at the hardware store they are assigned to clear out. Glenn tells Nicholas that he will be keeping a close eye on him from now on. Nicholas tells him he just wants to help which Glenn says he can. At a shop between Alexandria and the quarry, Glenn, Heath, and Nicholas are tasked with killing a group of walkers trapped inside, so the noise made by the trapped walkers won't distract the approaching herd to veer off course. Glenn initially refuses to let Nicholas help, but Nicholas insists, and he saves Heath from being bitten by a walker. Later in the episode "Thank You" Glenn volunteers to start a distraction fire. Going with Nicholas, they run from the herd into a dead end alleyway, where they kill as many walkers as they can, but get trapped on top of a dumpster. Nicholas has a panic attack, says "Thank you" to Glenn, and shoots himself in the head. His body falls against Glenn, knocking him off the dumpster and into the herd of walkers. He is last seen lying on the ground underneath Nicholas' body, as the walkers begin to eat it. In the episode "Now," Maggie reveals that she is pregnant with Glenn's child. In the episode "Heads Up," Glenn is seen escaping from underneath the dumpster. He is then found by Enid, whom he talks into returning with him to Alexandria. The two start to form an uneasy friendship despite having contrasting philosophies of survival. The two release balloons outside the walker-surrounded gates as a sign that they are alive. In the mid-season finale "Start to Finish," Glenn and Enid observe Maggie as she escapes from the herd that has invaded Alexandria, and they begin to formulate a plan to enter the city. In the episode "Not Tomorrow Yet," Glenn makes his first kill along with Heath and Tara and takes an active part in the gun battle with the Saviors. At the end of the episode he is distraught to learn that Maggie and Carol have been kidnapped by another group of Saviors. Maggie and Carol manage to escape and Glenn and Maggie are soon reunited. In "East," Glenn leaves Alexandria with Rosita and Michonne to go after Daryl, who wants to avenge Denise's death by killing Dwight. All four end up captured by Dwight, who shoots Daryl. In the finale "Last Day on Earth," the four are unloaded from the back of a truck by Dwight, where they discover Rick, Carl, Maggie, Abraham, Sasha, Eugene, and Aaron have already been captured. Negan announces his plan to beat one of them to death using his baseball bat called Lucille as punishment for the group having killed so many of his people. He initially offers to put the pregnant Maggie out of her misery then and there, causing Glenn to beg for her life; he is thrown back into the line by Dwight. After contemplating whom to kill, Negan decides to select at random by saying "eenie, meanie, minie, mo." The season ends with Negan beating an unknown target to death.

==== Season 7 ====
In the seventh-season premiere, "The Day Will Come When You Won't Be", Abraham is revealed to be Negan's chosen victim; Negan brutally beats him to death with Lucille as the rest of the group watches, horrified. When Daryl strikes Negan in the face in retaliation, Negan strikes Glenn with Lucille. After two blows to the head, Glenn sits up, severely brain damaged with a dislocated eye and caved in skull, and mutters "Maggie, I'll find you", before Negan repeatedly bludgeons Glenn's skull into a bloody pulp. After Negan and the Saviors leave Abraham and Glenn's corpses are loaded onto a truck Maggie and Sasha take to Hilltop. Rick then hallucinates an idealistic lifestyle in Alexandria with everyone, Abraham and Glenn included, eating dinner together. In "The Cell", Negan's henchman Dwight leaves a picture of Glenn's mangled corpse in Daryl's cell, where he is being held captive, to torment him. In "Go Getters", Glenn and Abraham are shown to be buried together at Hilltop.

=== Video games ===
Glenn's appearance in the first episode of The Walking Dead video game is his first chronological appearance in the franchise. The character is voiced by Nick Herman. Lee Everett works with Glenn in "A New Day," revealing that they are both from Macon, Georgia. Glenn volunteers to go out and scavenge for the survivors hiding out in Lee's family's pharmacy, but is pinned down by walkers at a local motel while trying to rescue a trapped girl, and the player must go out to save him. The girl, who has been infected, ends up killing herself before Glenn helps Lee's group escape. Glenn decides to leave the group at the end of the episode and return to Atlanta to find his friends, tying into his comic and television appearance.

In the same year, Glenn also appeared in the plug-and-play rail shooter TV game The Walking Dead: Zombie Hunter as a non-player character whom the player character encounters and defends in later levels.

== Development ==
=== Casting and characterization ===
Steven Yeun was announced to be part of the main cast in May 2010, along with Laurie Holden. Former showrunner and executive producer Glen Mazzara describes Glenn as "the heart of the show." He said that "everybody loves that character; everybody's rooting for that character. He may be tortured and sensitive, but he's always a hero." Robert Kirkman described Glenn as being "essential in keeping [the series] from being the unrelenting depressing thing that it definitely has the potential to be. Anything upbeat or uplifting usually comes from that character. I also think that Glenn's relationship with Maggie is one of the clearest senses of hope that you get from the story."

Glen Mazzara has confirmed that Glenn's last name is Rhee. Glenn's last name is also listed on his page on AMC's official The Walking Dead site. It had never been mentioned on-screen in the TV series until Season 7, Episode 5, "Go Getters," when Maggie says to Gregory, "My name is Maggie, Maggie Rhee."

=== Critical reception ===
Yeun's portrayal of Glenn has been praised, particularly for breaking on-screen stereotypes associated with Asian-American men, and the depth of the character's relationship with Maggie. In May 2011, he received a Saturn Award nomination for Best Supporting Actor in Television.

The episode "Cherokee Rose" marks Glenn and Maggie's first sexual encounter. Critics commended the development of the relationship between Maggie and Glenn. Andrew Conrad of The Baltimore Sun stated that the storyline epitomized a "steamy romance," while The Wall Street Journal's Aaron Rutkoff called it "the funniest moment of the series." Goldman opined that their sexual encounter felt genuine; "He's a nice guy, she seems like a cool gal, and it felt genuine when she noted she felt plenty lonely too and ready for some companionship." Nick Venable of Cinema Blend felt that the interactions between Maggie and Glenn were the highlight of the episode. "I'm glad the writers are introducing this comic book plot point, as this show seriously needs a couple without closets full of skeletons. When Glenn accidentally grabs a box of condoms for Maggie to see, I chuckled heartily. The ensuing conversation also made me smile, which makes me wonder why humor is paid the least amount of attention on the show." Jackson was surprised with the scene, and called it "unexpected." Polygon staff ranked him as one of their "69 biggest crushes of the last decade" and described him to be "shy cutie to Hot Dad".

In the comic book and television mediums, Glenn is murdered by Negan, who uses his infamous barbwire bat "Lucille" to repeatedly bash his head in to a pulp as his wife and friends watch horrified, and helplessly after being captured by the Saviors. There is a difference in how his death occurs: In the comic books, after being forced to their knees, Glenn was revealed to be the victim chosen outright to die. However, Abraham Ford received this fate on TV in the episode "The Day Will Come When You Won't Be." Glenn was still killed off in the same episode, with his demise being a result of Daryl Dixon disobeying Negan's rules. The deaths led to significant debate regarding the direction of the show. Some viewers and critics saw the deaths as too violent, with a number of them stating that the show had gone too far or that they would stop watching it; others felt that Glenn's death was needed because it reflects the comic book version and that both deaths show how brutal Negan can be.

Noel Murray of Rolling Stone ranked Glenn Rhee 6th in a list of 30 best Walking Dead characters, saying, "Prior to his murder, the ever-upbeat ex-delivery man had been in the series as long as Rick, and though he'd seemed to be dead multiple times before, our man Glenn somehow persevered each and every time … except the last time. His final fate appears to mark a turning point in the plot, signaling the end of the survivor's can-do spirit and the dawn of despair. For many, Steven Yeun's character was the heart and soul of the show. R.I.P."
