= Teri Wyble =

American actress

- Occupation: Actress
- Years active: 2009–present

Teri Wyble is an American actress who has appeared in the AMC drama The Walking Dead as Officer Shepherd and in Terminator Genisys as the human resistance soldier Mariam.

== Career ==
Wyble landed her first on-screen role as Dominic Cooper's character's doomed wife in Abraham Lincoln: Vampire Hunter. Wyble traveled to Seeboden, Austria where she was awarded Model of the Year at the 2010 World Bodypainting Festival. Wyble appeared on the AMC drama The Walking Dead as a character named Officer Shepherd, and in the film Terminator Genisys as a character named Mariam.

== Filmography ==
=== Film ===
Year	Title	Role	Notes
2012	Abraham Lincoln: Vampire Hunter	Henry's Wife	
2013	Bullet to the Head	Belle	
2013	Beautiful Creatures	Charlotte Duchannes	
2014	When the Game Stands Tall	Jenny Ladouceur	
2015	Self/less	Andrea	
2015	American Ultra	Tech #1	
2015	Terminator Genisys	Mariam	
2015	Mississippi Grind	Women Buyer	
2016	Jack Reacher: Never Go Back	Prud'homme's Wife	
2020	Lost Bayou	Gal	
2020	The Hunt	Liberty	
2020	Still Today	Jenny	
2022	Presence	Vivian	

=== Television ===
Year	Title	Role	Notes
2011	Ricochet	Redhead	Television film
2012	Common Law	Dance Partner	Episode: "Soul Mates"
2013	Nashville	Gwen	Episode: "I'll Never Get Out of This World Alive"
2014	The Originals	Clara Summerlin	2 episodes
2014	Drop Dead Diva	Rachel	Episode: "Life & Death"
2014	Reckless	Erica Tanner	Episode: "Parting Shots"
2014	The Walking Dead	Officer Shepherd	3 episodes
2015	Zoo	Amy Falco	Episode: "That Great Big Hill of Hope"
2017	Preacher	Sophie	Episode: "Puzzle Piece"
2018	Christmas Contract	Amy	Television film
