= Daryl Dixon =

Character from the television series The Walking Dead

- The Walking Dead character
- Daryl Dixon, as portrayed by Norman Reedus in the television series
- First appearance: "Tell It to the Frogs" (2010)
- Created by: Frank Darabont; Charles H. Eglee; Jack LoGiudice
- Portrayed by: Norman Reedus; Luis Coiduras (child)
- Voiced by: Norman Reedus (Survival Instinct, Onslaught, Call of Duty: Modern Warfare III, Dead by Daylight, World of Tanks, World War Z); Atticus Batacan (Destinies)

In-universe information
- Gender: Male
- Occupation: Hunter for the Atlanta Camp; Prison Council Member; Recruiter for the Alexandria Safe-Zone; Member of the Militia; Leader of the Saviors; Biofuel Producer
- Weapon: Stryker crossbow
- Family: Will Dixon (father); Merle Dixon (brother); Jess Collins (half-uncle); William T. Dixon (grandfather); Dog (pet dog)

Daryl Dixon is a fictional character from AMC's horror drama series The Walking Dead portrayed by actor Norman Reedus. He appears as a major character in The Walking Dead and as the titular character of its spin-off series The Walking Dead: Daryl Dixon. He also serves as the protagonist of the last three seasons of the original series, replacing Rick Grimes. The character was created for the television series by writers Frank Darabont, Charles H. Eglee and Jack LoGiudice specifically for Norman Reedus, and does not have a counterpart in the comics on which the series is based. The character was introduced in the first season as a southerner and expert tracker, living in the shadow of his older brother, Merle. Despite his initial bad temper and volatility, he is tolerated by the core group of survivors due to his survival skills and fearless efficiency in killing walkers. Following the events of Merle's disappearance, Daryl lets his guard down and starts to bond with the group, particularly Carol Peletier after her daughter's disappearance, and Beth Greene after the two split off together in the fourth season. The character becomes the cooperative right-hand man and protector of protagonist Rick Grimes and leads several supply runs. He is one of the longest surviving characters of the television series and one of the core members of the original Atlanta group. His origin is explored in the 2013 video game The Walking Dead: Survival Instinct, and he stars in the mobile game The Walking Dead: No Man's Land.

Daryl has been well received by fans and critics. Initially a member of the recurring cast, Reedus was upgraded to series regular after the first season. Following Andrew Lincoln's departure as Rick in the ninth season, Reedus got top billing and took over as the series' protagonist.

In September 2020, it was announced that Reedus and Melissa McBride (Carol) would lead their own spin-off series set for a 2023 premiere, following the conclusion of The Walking Dead's eleventh and final season. However, McBride exited the project prior to filming and it was reworked to focus on Daryl. The series, titled The Walking Dead: Daryl Dixon, premiered in September 2023 with its first season. Ultimately, McBride joined the main cast as Carol in Daryl Dixon's second season—with the sub-title The Book of Carol—in a return to the show's original concept.

== Appearances ==
In their childhood, Daryl and his older brother, Merle, lived with their abusive, alcoholic father, Will. He was raised by Merle, though Merle was often away (serving time in juvenile institutions). Daryl had significant periods of time alone and, throughout these lonely periods, learned to fend for himself and adopted a hard-boiled survivalist mindset. When the outbreak occurs he and Merle fend for themselves and drift around, avoiding walkers. Unlike his brother, Daryl has never been to prison (as an inmate), and was offended when Beth revealed to him that she had believed he had during a drinking game ("Still").

During the first season and for much of the second, Daryl rides his brother Merle's Triumph Bonneville chopper with the Nazi German ᛋᛋ (Schutzstaffel) insignia prominently displayed on the fuel tank. In the final episode of the second season, Daryl jokes that he could identify Glenn by his driving, due to Glenn being Korean. Daryl usually has a serious demeanor, but occasionally makes wry comments and jokes to break the tension. By the third season, he has become a responsible, trusted and loyal member of the group. His priorities are tested when he learns that his brother is still alive and working for an opposing group in Woodbury run by The Governor.

=== Season 1 ===
Daryl is first introduced in the episode "Tell It to the Frogs". Having been a hunter to secure wildlife for nourishment of the survivor group outside of Atlanta, he is furious to learn they left his brother Merle handcuffed to plumbing atop a skyscraper in the city, and puts most of his anger on Rick Grimes, the newcomer of the group. Daryl joins Rick and others to return to the city, finding that Merle escaped by cutting off his hand. Daryl becomes one of the group's key fighters, but falls in under Rick's orders as they abandon Atlanta, driving his brother's motorcycle.

=== Season 2 ===
The group settles onto Hershel Greene's farmstead as they look for Carol Peletier's missing daughter Sophia after a walker attack. Daryl aids in the search, and tries to help Carol cope with her feelings.

During one solo outing, he is knocked from a horse and suffers hallucinations of Merle, complaining that he is spending time searching for Sophia and not for him, before returning to the group. After Sophia is discovered to have already been turned into a walker and hidden away in Hershel's barn, Daryl helps Carol to cope with her loss. He helps protect the group as they deal with a potential threat of hostile survivors nearby, and to help evacuate the farm when it is overrun by walkers.

=== Season 3 ===
Rick's group find and secure a prison as a new shelter. In dealing with this, Rick's wife Lori dies after giving birth to her daughter, and Rick is devastated, having hallucinations of her and unable to make decisions. Daryl steps up to help lead the group alongside Hershel during Rick's lapse. His friendship with Carol strengthens after she was feared lost dealing with the walkers.

The group is forced to deal with the Governor from the nearby Woodbury community, who seeks to kill them and take their supplies for himself. In rescuing two of their allies kidnapped by the Governor, Daryl discovers Merle is still alive, having escaped Atlanta, but working for the Governor. After the Governor considers Merle a traitor, Daryl helps him to escape and returns with him to the prison. Rick's group knows the Governor seeks to capture Michonne or else attack the prison, but Rick's hallucinations leave him unable to make the decision, and Merle takes Michonne himself to the Governor, with Daryl following him after discovering his absence. Merle had a change of heart, lets Michonne go, and sacrificially ambushes the Governor's men. Daryl arrives to find the reanimated corpse of Merle, killed by the Governor, and cries as he is forced to put his brother down. Rick's group fends off a major attack by the Governor, driving him away, and bring the survivors of Woodbury to the prison.

=== Season 4 ===
Rick has recovered from Lori's death, and he, Daryl, and Hershel lead the growing population. A flu-like epidemic strikes the prison, killing many before a cure is found. Carol takes initiative to kill two who have shown signs of the flu in secret, and when Rick discovers this, evicts her from the group, upsetting Daryl.

The Governor, having obtained more men, launches a fatal assault on the prison, forcing the survivors to flee in separate groups. Daryl rescues Beth Greene, who is catatonic after watching the Governor behead her father Hershel. After days of traveling, Beth opens up to Daryl, and the two get drunk on moonshine as they talk about and let go of their pasts. A few days later, the two are briefly separated while fleeing walkers, and Daryl sees Beth kidnapped by men in a car with a white cross on it. He tries to follow them but is caught by Joe and a small group of bandits, the Claimers, and they force him to stay with them. The group later captures Rick, Carl, and Michonne, but Rick and Daryl fight back when they attempt to rape Carl and Michonne, killing all of the Claimers.

The four travel to Terminus, a safe haven according to signs along a railroad track. Though the community seems open, they find evidence that their friends have been captured. The four are taken prisoner and taken to the others, with Rick asserting they messed with the wrong group.

=== Season 5 ===
Rick's group escapes Terminus after discovering they engage in cannibalism with the help of Carol, who had launched a walker horde on the site. After meeting Gabriel Stokes at his church, the group makes plans to head to Washington D.C. While Daryl and Carol are catching up, they see a car drive by with a similar white cross on it, and they give chase. This leads them to find that Beth was taken to Grady Memorial Hospital in Atlanta, where she was forced to work on patients by corrupt cops. After Carol is captured, Daryl leads Rick's group to try to rescue them. Carol is saved but Beth is killed in a standoff with the cops, and Daryl returns her body to the church to bury her.

The group continues on, eventually meeting Aaron, a recruiter for the Alexandria Safe-Zone in Virginia, who offers them sanctuary there. Like Rick, Daryl remains skeptical given the lack of survival experience the residents have, but accepts Aaron's offer to assist them in finding more recruits. Daryl and Aaron find the community is being watched by the Wolves, exiles from Alexandria that seek revenge. After walking into a Wolves trap, they are rescued by Morgan Jones, Rick's friend before he met the rest of the group in Atlanta, and they bring him back to Alexandria.

=== Season 6 ===
Rick and the others of his group are put in charge of Alexandria after proving their survival skills. To get rid of a walker horde trapped in a nearby quarry, Rick plans to parade them far away from Alexandria. Daryl, along with Abraham and Sasha, leads the parade. However, the Wolves launch a surprise attack, breaking the parade, though Rick instructs Daryl to lead the remaining away. The attack breaches the walls of Alexandria, allowing walkers to swarm in. After leading the remaining walkers away, Daryl is briefly waylaid by Dwight and his wife Sherry. He finds a fuel truck, regroups with Abraham and Sasha, and quickly deals with a group of men working for Negan. They ignite the truck in Alexandria to lure the walkers away from the citizens to dispatch them.

As Alexandria is recovering, Carol opts to leave on her own, concerned about seeing others she cares for die, leaving Daryl upset. Rick and Daryl meet Paul "Jesus" Rovia and are introduced to the Hilltop community. They request help dealing with the Saviors, a brutal group that demands supplies as a periodic offering. Rick, Daryl and others launch an attack on a Savior outpost, appearing to kill Negan and all of the Saviors. Later, Daryl encounters Dwight again with other men who claim to be Saviors working for Negan. After reporting this to Rick and the others, Daryl patrols to track down the Saviors but is soon captured. He is brought to a clearing along with Rick and several others of the group that has been captured by the Saviors, and they meet the real Negan, who wields a baseball bat wrapped with barbed wired named "Lucille". Negan prepares to kill one of the group in retaliation for the attack on the Savior compound and force them to swear loyalty to him.

=== Season 7 ===
After Negan chooses Abraham to kill, Daryl punches him but he is tackled by the Saviors. In retribution for this attack, Negan proceeds to kill Glenn, and then cows Rick into submission. Daryl is taken prisoner by Dwight back to Sanctuary, the Saviors' base. Dwight attempts to convert him to join Negan, but Daryl refuses. Later, Sherry helps Daryl to escape, and he is escorted to Hilltop by Jesus, where Rick and others are meeting to discuss the situation with Negan. After a tearful reunion, they all agree Daryl is a fugitive from Negan, while Jesus suggests Daryl go to the Kingdom, run by King Ezekiel, for safety as well as to try to convince Ezekiel to help. There, Ezekiel remains uncommitted since his deal with Negan is amicable but offers Daryl shelter.

While there, one of Ezekiel's men, Richard, suggests a plan to lure Ezekiel into fighting the Saviors by having the Savior kill a woman whom Ezekiel has taken a liking to but who is staying outside of the Kingdom. Daryl realizes this is Carol and refuses to go along with the plan. He opts to return to Hilltop but stops to reunite with Carol on his way out. After debriefing the Hilltop community, he apologizes to Maggie for Glenn's death and she forgives him. Daryl then returns to Alexandria and helps prepare for a plan to attack Negan the next time he comes. However, they find Dwight has arrived, who swears that he wants to help them stop Negan despite Daryl's reservations. Negan does launch a surprise attack on Alexandria, but the timely arrival of the Hilltop and Kingdom communities allow them to overpower the Saviors and their allies, the Scavengers, and the three communities agree to go to war against Negan. Daryl finds a note from Dwight swearing he did not know what Negan had planned.

=== Season 8 ===
Daryl is first seen in the season premiere, "Mercy", where he is key to their plan to attack the Sanctuary by luring a massive walker herd using placed explosives and his motorcycle. After their plan succeeds, he splits off with Rick to attack a compound housing Savior weaponry. "Monsters" shows Daryl and Rick searching the compound for the guns to no avail; unlike Rick, who is beginning to question their decision to go to war, Daryl has no qualms about their mission, killing former Atlanta survivor Morales and executing a Savior to whom Rick showed mercy. He is still distrusting Dwight.

When Rick and Daryl have a misunderstanding, their newly acquired weapons are accidentally set ablaze as they fight. After Dwight is later exposed as a mole, one Savior gets away after the rest are shot, and then Dwight asks to be spared. As he is led away, Daryl takes back his vest. Despite this, Daryl remains hostile to Dwight and expressly states his intention of killing him once the war is over. Though Tara initially agrees with him on this, she changes her mind after Dwight saves her life twice.

In the season finale, Daryl takes part in the final battle with the Saviors and survives. Afterward, he drives Dwight out into the woods where Dwight expects Daryl to execute him. Instead, Daryl exiles Dwight on the threat of death if he ever returns and encourages his former enemy to seek out his wife, Sherry.

=== Season 9 ===
Eighteen months have passed since Rick defeated Negan. The communities of Alexandria, Hilltop, the Kingdom, Oceanside, and the Sanctuary have rebuilt what they can to make more viable societies. Daryl and Eugene oversee the remaining Saviors at the Sanctuary. Justin, a Savior, tries to take more than his share and pushes Henry. Daryl rushes in to subdue Justin before Rick can assert his control over the group. Rick and Daryl realize the Saviors are starting to get out of hand, due to Rick's hurry to finish the bridge and the lack of food. Later, they set off the dynamite, and track the nearby walker horde as it diverts towards the first siren. However, when the second siren, manned by Justin, fails to sound, Rick realizes the group of men at a logging site nearby are in trouble.

Maggie, Daryl, and the Oceanside group conspire to assassinate Negan. They know Rick will not let Maggie into Alexandria as she has made her intentions clear, and start to work out a plan to bring Maggie into Alexandria without Rick's knowledge. Jesus, who is hesitant about this course of action, covertly contacts Rick to warn him. Rick is overseeing the takedown of the bridge-construction camp. Eugene warns Rick of two large hordes seen in the area, but both are moving divergent to their routes. Rick gets Jesus' word and decides to head to Alexandria. He contacts one of the Alexandria watchpoints to tell them to be on the lookout for Maggie, unaware that the watchpoint is a member of Oceanside. When Rick prepares to go by horseback, Daryl offers to drive him there instead via motorcycle. Rick becomes concerned when Daryl purposely misses the turnoff for Alexandria. He demands Daryl stop the bike, and the two get into a fistfight. Both end up falling into a deep pit off the road that they cannot easily climb out of. The two eventually put aside their differences and work together to escape the pit.

At the construction camp, the remaining survivors are preparing to move out when a group of Saviors holds them at gunpoint. They demand the group turn over weapons for the Saviors to protect themselves since they know Oceanside has been killing off the other Saviors. A firefight breaks out, Rick and Daryl hear the sounds of gunfire and rush to escape. Just as they start clearing the edge, walkers from one of the approaching hordes, start falling into the pit, but both still manage to get out alive. Rick sees a loose horse nearby and offers to lead the walker horde away from the camp while Daryl drives off to warn them. Rick, on horseback, leads the horde along but is surprised when the other horde that Eugene warned him of is converging on the same point. The horse knocks Rick off its back, making him land hard on a concrete block and being impaled by a piece of rebar. Ultimately, Rick appears to sacrifice his life to destroy the bridge and the walkers with it. Daryl joins the others in mourning Rick, unaware that he was saved at the last minute by Jadis, the leader of the Scavengers group, who took him to parts unknown.

Six years later, Daryl has alienated himself from the group, living alone in the wilderness. However, he remains friends with Carol and her and Ezekiel's adopted son, Henry, taking on the latter as an apprentice blacksmith. Daryl takes Jesus and Aaron along with him to search for Eugene, who has gone missing; when they find Eugene, he warns them of walkers who have apparently evolved enough to speak to each other; these turn out to be the Whisperers, a group of survivors who wear masks made from walker skin and speak in hushed tones in order to blend in with real walkers and avoid attacks. Daryl and Michonne find and interrogate Lydia, the teenage daughter of the Whisperers' leader, Alpha. Daryl sees that Henry and Lydia have feelings for each other, and warns the boy that she is not to be trusted. Eventually, however, Daryl sees that Lydia is not like her ruthless, bloodthirsty mother, and becomes a mentor to her.

Alpha arrives at Hilltop with her followers, demanding Lydia's release. Daryl refuses at first, but relents when he sees that the Whisperers have captured two of their residents, Alden and Luke; he agrees to give her Lydia in return for them. Later, Henry leaves the Hilltop, suggesting he is going out to look for Lydia; Daryl sets off with Connie in pursuit. They disguise themselves as Whisperers and rescue Henry and Lydia, pursued by Alpha's right-hand man, Beta. They take shelter in an abandoned building, where Daryl fights Beta and pushes him down an elevator shaft. They join Michonne and Rick's now-preteen daughter Judith to go to the Kingdom, unaware that the Whisperers are following them. Alpha infiltrates the Kingdom and shows Daryl a massive horde of walkers that she threatens to unleash upon the communities if they cross into Whisperer territory again. Soon afterward, Alpha murders several Hilltop residents, including Henry, and leaves their severed, zombified heads on pikes as a warning. Siddiq, Michonne, Daryl, Carol and Yumiko reach the line marked by the pikes. Daryl shields a grief-stricken Carol from the sight of her beheaded son. When she and Ezekiel separate, she moves in with Daryl.

=== Season 10 ===
Months later, Daryl watches with growing concern how Carol obsesses over killing Alpha and avenging Henry; at one point, he is forced to stop her from attacking Alpha directly. Carol and Daryl set out to destroy Alpha's walker horde, but after Carol captures a Whisperer, Daryl suspects that she is motivated more by revenge than by protecting the community. He nevertheless helps her and several other Kingdom and Hilltop residents pursue Alpha, who lures them into a cave and traps them. Daryl and most of the others escape, and he saves Carol's life. Negan gets close to Alpha and kills her on Carol's orders; it is left ambiguous whether Daryl knew about it.

Beta rallies a huge herd of walkers to attack the community's new headquarters, an abandoned hospital, but Daryl sneaks through the horde and leads it away using a wagon and loud music. The Whisperers destroy the makeshift sound system, forcing Daryl's group to infiltrate the horde and kill the Whisperers one by one. Daryl wounds Beta, who is consumed by the walkers, while Lydia and Carol lead the horde over a cliff.

The episode "Find Me" establishes via flashbacks that, five years earlier, Daryl had gone to live by himself in the woods after Rick's apparent death. One day, Daryl found a dog in an empty cabin; the dog's owner, Leah, thought he was trying to rob her, and held him at gunpoint. She set him free eventually, and they had occasional, random meetings until they became a couple. They were together for 10 months, but Daryl could not decide whether to commit to her or his community, and she left after they had an argument. Daryl wrote Leah a note asking her to find him and put it in a secret compartment, and left to reunite with Carol and Henry.

In the present, Daryl returns to the cabin in hopes of finding Leah, and Carol follows him. The cabin is empty, but the secret compartment has been opened, giving Daryl hope that Leah read his note and is trying to find him. Carol tells Daryl to let Leah go, angering him; they get into an argument in which he blames her for the apparent death of Connie, one of their community members (he is unaware that she is still alive). The two wash their hands off each other and go their separate ways.

=== Season 11 ===
Daryl has lost some of his bitter rage and willingly works with Negan during the mission to take down the Reapers. Daryl's surprise reunion with Leah allows him to infiltrate the group with Daryl trying to both take them down and protect both his former lover and his adopted family, something that Daryl and Leah share in common. Nevertheless, the mission ends with Leah being forced on the run. With both Rick and Michonne gone, Daryl takes up the role of a parent towards Judith and R.J., something that he struggles with at times, although Daryl makes for a good father overall. Daryl also seems to have mended his relationship with Carol after Connie's return and moving to the Commonwealth, the two even planning to have lunch together at one point. Working as a soldier in the Commonwealth Army, Daryl maintains his loyalty to his friends and family, even threatening Lance Hornsby at gunpoint when he steps out of line. Commonwealth General Michael Mercer, who has to deal with corruption in his forces, is shown to have a great deal of respect and trust in Daryl despite them having a short relationship. During this period, while Daryl wears his armor often, he also discards it in situations where he's around his friends, such as the standoff at Hilltop and working with Gabriel and Aaron despite them being with a number of other Commonwealth soldiers. When Leah resurfaces, Daryl kills his former lover to protect Maggie and tells her that he feels he owes it to Glenn to protect her in the stead of Daryl's deceased friend.

After things go sideways at the Commonwealth, Daryl and Carol manage to escape together and break Lance out of prison to help them find where their missing friends have gone. After Lance reveals that there's a supply train that they can follow, Carol finally kills him when Lance tries to pull a gun on the pair rather than accepting their offer of an exile instead. Seeing Connie held prisoner on the train reminds Daryl of losing her previously and he is torn between rescuing Connie and risking their overall mission or continuing to follow the train. After linking up with the escaped Maggie, Gabriel and Rosita, the group attacks the train and rescues Connie, but the train engineer commits suicide rather than tell them where Outpost 22, the location that their friends have been taken to, is. Posing as one of the dead troopers on the radio, Rosita manages to trick a friendly trooper into revealing that Outpost 22 is actually a Commonwealth occupied and renamed Alexandria. Daryl's group sneaks in through the sewers, coinciding with a prisoner rebellion led by Ezekiel and Negan. As the sadistic Warden tries to escape with Kelly as a hostage, he is subdued by Daryl and then fed to a walker by Rosita. Assisted by General Mercer and sympathetic troops, Daryl and the others attempt to overthrow Governor Pamela Milton, only to have Judith be shot in the chaos and a massive herd of walkers overrun the Commonwealth, aided by the fact that there are variant walkers who display greater intelligence and skills than normal walkers. After rushing Judith to a doctor who manages to save her life with the help of a blood transfusion from Daryl, the group confronts Pamela, and Daryl and Gabriel persuade her troops to see that the dead are their real enemy, not each other. Pamela's forces stand down and she is imprisoned for her crimes while everyone comes together to save the Commonwealth from destruction.

At the end of the series, after learning from Judith that Rick is still alive and that Michonne is looking for him, Daryl departs from the Commonwealth a year later in search of his old friends, leaving Dog in Judith's care. Daryl and Carol part with a warm goodbye while Judith encourages Daryl to find a happy ending of his own.

=== The Walking Dead: Daryl Dixon ===
==== Season 1 ====
Following his departure from the Commonwealth, Daryl is captured under unknown circumstances by an enemy group and placed aboard a ship belonging to Pouvoir which is collecting live test subjects from around the world for their experimentation on walkers. In the Gulf of Cadiz, according to the ship's captain, Daryl manages to escape, instigate a mutiny and he flees overboard, but is stopped on the shore of France near Marseille. Daryl begins working his way across France seeking a way back to America. Following an encounter with a new walker variant dubbed "burners," Daryl has a run in with two thieves and two guerriers from Pouvoir, helping the thieves when the two men get rough with the young woman, Maribelle. During the fight, Maribelle kills one man, Michel Codron, something that she later pins on Daryl. Found by a nun named Isabelle, Daryl is taken to an abbey where his wounds are treated and Isabelle attempts to enlist Daryl's help to transport a young boy named Laurent to a community called the Nest up north as the nuns and the religious movement that they are a part of, the Union of Hope, believes that Laurent is destined to become the next Messiah who will lead humanity to a revival. Daryl refuses and leaves, but he comes back to help when Stephane Codron, Michel's vengeful older brother, launches an attack on the abbey, killing most of the nuns. After helping to fend off the attackers, Daryl agrees to take Isabelle, Sylvie and Laurent up north in exchange for help in reaching the still-active port of Le Havre which, unbeknownst to Daryl, is controlled by Pouvoir who are after Daryl for his escape and the trouble that he caused them.

The group sets out for Paris, only to lose their mule and encounter a group of children. Needing a horse, Daryl helps the children defeat a hostile American survivor named RJ Gaines who has been plaguing them, in the process rescuing one kid who was kidnapped and putting down another who had become a walker. After finally reaching Paris, Daryl's frustrations begin to boil over with the discovery that the friendly community there only uses homing pigeons for communication and the discovery that Isabelle's ex-boyfriend Quinn is actually Laurent's father. Daryl decides to set out on his own, blowing up at Isabelle about all of her secrets, only to have Codron and Pouvoir attacking them. Escaping from the attack, Daryl and Isabelle track Laurent to the ruins of the Eiffel Tower, only for Quinn's men to kidnap him as a way of getting at Isabelle. Rescuing Laurent from Quinn, Daryl agrees to take the boy the rest of the way to the Nest by himself, reluctantly leaving Isabelle to turn herself into Quinn in exchange for his help while Sylvie decides to stay in Paris after having fallen in love with another survivor named Emile.

Daryl, Laurent and Quinn are captured by guerriers. Genet pits Daryl in a gladiator fight against one of her enhanced walkers. Daryl manages to kill the walker. Daryl and Quinn, chained together, kill enhanced walkers in the arena before Fallou kills the guerrier Genet ordered to shoot them. In the ensuing chaos, the group escapes and, after an attack, reaches the Nest, where they settle in. Daryl becomes conflicted between staying in France and returning to America. Union of Hope leader Losang arranges passage to Newfoundland for Daryl, who chooses to leave despite Isabelle's comparing his abandoning Laurent to Daryl's abandonment by his own father. At Normandy, Daryl visits the grave of his grandfather William, who died on D-Day. On Omaha Beach, Daryl is preparing to board a boat when he notices that Laurent has followed him and has walkers closing in on him.

==== Season 2 − The Book of Carol ====
Two weeks later, Daryl, having decided to stay at the Nest, trains Laurent in fighting the undead and clashes with Losang about his more violent ways compared to the Union of Hope's pacifism. After Genet's troops capture Fallou and Emile, Daryl leads a raid and rescues them, although Genet escapes before he can shoot her. Meanwhile, Carol searches for Daryl in America and finds a trail of evidence pointing her to France. Carol eventually tricks pilot Ash Patel into flying her to France to rescue Daryl.

Daryl, Isabelle and Fallou are lured into a trap by Emile on the orders of Losang and his fanatical lieutenant, Jacinta, who see Daryl's influence as a threat to them. The three overcome the trap and kill Emile for his betrayal, learning that Losang intends to test Laurent's possible immunity to the zombie virus by having him bitten. Daryl is forced to kill a zombified Sylvie in order to save the boy, but he and Isabelle are captured. As Pouvoir attacks, Daryl manages to escape from his cell and reunites with Carol who had located Daryl with Codron's help. However, Losang fatally stabbed Isabelle who dies in Daryl's arms. In pursuit of Laurent, Daryl and Carol come up against Genet and her soldiers on a Normandy plantation. Working together, they overpower the guerriers and Carol kills Genet.

Returning to Paris, the two discover that Pouvoir has mostly fallen apart with the death of its leader, aside from a small faction that allied itself with Losang in pursuit of Laurent. Daryl and Carol rescue Ash from walkers and Daryl kills Losang in a brutal fight in the Catacombs of Paris with the help of Codron. After the battle, the two men make peace, and Daryl later reveals to Codron that he did not kill Codron's brother.

With the revelation that Ash's plane can only seat three people, Daryl decides to remain behind in France as Ash and Carol take Laurent to the Commonwealth for his safety. Under the command of Jacinta, a joint force from the Union and Pouvoir attacks the makeshift airfield, forcing Daryl, Codron and Fallou to fend them off. Carol decides to disembark from the plane and join them, ensuring Ash and Laurent's escape, but stranding her and Daryl in France once more. Having been bitten in the battle, Jacinta commits suicide. Daryl, Carol and Codron, accompanied by a Scottish couple, traverse the English Channel via the Channel Tunnel, but hallucinations cause the couple to betray them and Codron to run off in pursuit of a hallucination of his brother.

==== Season 3 ====
Daryl and Carol reach London, only to discover it and the entire country deserted. Trapped by thousands of walkers for days in an abandoned apartment building, Daryl and Carol meet Julian Chamberlain who believes himself to be the last survivor in the entire country. The three decide to use Julian's sailboat to reach America and set sail after Julian uses Big Ben to draw away the walkers. However, a storm wrecks the boat on the coast of Spain, killing Julian in the process.

Daryl forces a young couple, Roberto and Justina, to take them to Solaz del Mar for treatment for Carol's injuries. Unlike Carol, who develops a budding romance with Roberto's father Antonio, Daryl attempts to stay out of local affairs and focus on fixing the boat despite the extortion that El Alcázar forces upon Solaz and other communities. Having lost too many people that he cares about recently by getting involved in someone else's fight, Daryl would rather avoid that. In contrast, Carol is increasingly sympathetic and drawn in by the plight of Justina and the other girls traded as brides to El Alcázar. Regardless, Daryl helps to save Solaz from an attack by an army of Los Primitivos and goes reluctantly goes after Roberto with Carol and Antonio when the young man chases after Justina and El Alcázar.

After learning that Justina was traded to El Alcázar by her own uncle who did it and lied to protect his power, Daryl agrees to go after her by himself while Carol and Antonio return to Solaz with the badly injured Roberto. Crossing the Monegros Desert, Daryl comes up against a gang of bandits called the Buzzards and encounters a leper colony living in the ruins of Belchite who had their water stolen by the Buzzards. Sympathetic to the lepers' plight, Daryl helps them to ambush and kill the bandits and recover their water.

Daryl is joined in his pursuit of El Alcázar by Paz, the Solaz head of security who had lost her girlfriend to El Alcázar years before. In Barcelona, the two recruit a group of refugees who had fled El Alcázar to help them ambush the convoy outside of Ciutat Vella, but the ambush fails. Pushing on to Alcázar of Seville, Daryl and Paz infiltrate the palace as workers for the matching ceremony. Daryl unleashes walkers upon the nobles, killing several, including the king and queen of Spain. Daryl rescues Justina and the other girls while Paz rescues Elena and kills Guillermo Torres, the crown prince and the leader of El Alcázar. Daryl burns the palace to the ground, bringing an end to El Alcázar, and parts ways with Paz who takes Elena, her son and the other girls to the refugee community to build a new life. Daryl takes Justina back to Solaz, arriving just in time to interrupt the execution of Carol, Antonio and Roberto and to expose Fede's crimes.

During these events, Daryl is haunted by recurring dreams of running away as a young boy with Merle's encouragement due to their father's abuse. Daryl admits to Carol that he's been running all of his life as a result and it leaves him too restless to ever stay in one place. Daryl worries that when they get back to the Commonwealth, he'll feel the same instinct again despite wanting to stay.

The night before Daryl, Carol, Antonio, Roberto and Justina are to set sail, a vengeful Fede attacks. In the process, the boat is destroyed, stranding Daryl's group without a way home once again.

== Development and creation ==
Reedus read the script for the show and wanted to be a part of it so badly that he begged to audition even for a day role. He was asked to come in and read lines. They picked Merle's lines, which is why the rumor still abounds that he read for the role of Merle, but Rooker already had the part. They liked his audition and gave him the role of Daryl. Daryl was originally a recurring character but was upgraded to the main cast in season two. Reedus originally asked the writers and crew if Daryl could get a dog. His request was denied, and Daryl instead got a new crossbow. In season 9, Daryl does get a dog who is first introduced in "Stradivarius."

== Reception ==
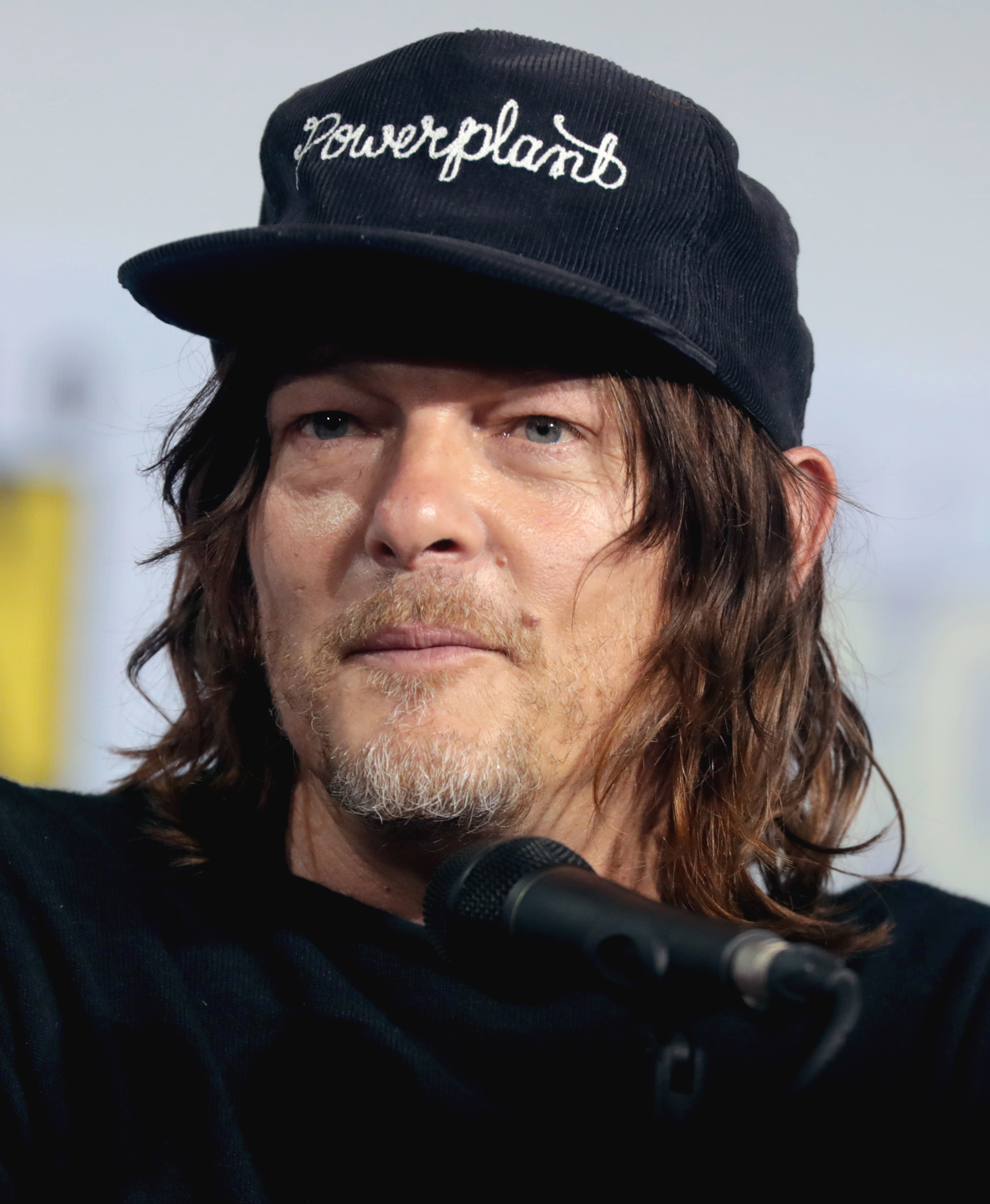
Norman Reedus' portrayal of Daryl Dixon has been lauded by critics and audiences.

After being fourth place in top billing for the third season, Daryl was promoted to second place in top billing for every season since the fourth, having become one of the lead characters of the series. He got top billing following the departure of Andrew Lincoln in season 9. Fans follow the character, and Reedus in other roles. They have debated Daryl's sexual orientation and sexuality, especially with regard to Caryl (Carol and Daryl) and Bethyl (Beth and Daryl) shippers. Addressing fan speculation that the character might be gay, bisexual, or asexual, The Walking Dead creator Robert Kirkman stated that Daryl is heterosexual, but that the show has portrayed him as "somewhat asexual": "I think that he's a very introverted character and I think that's somewhat his appeal."

Entertainment Weekly featured Reedus as Daryl on the cover of an issue previewing season three of The Walking Dead. Additionally, Daryl won IGN's "Best TV Hero" of 2012, and the character was featured in a Super Bowl XLVII commercial for Time Warner Cable. For his performance as Daryl, Reedus won the People's Choice Award for Favorite TV Hero in 2014 and was nominated for the Saturn Award for Best Supporting Actor on Television in 2011.

- TV Guide listed Daryl as the best character on The Walking Dead, ranking the top twenty four characters in the first five seasons. His transformation from a "selfish loner to an integral member of the survivors" was highlighted as well as being an "excellent hunter".
- The character holds the 2nd place in a list of "30 Best 'Walking Dead' Characters" by Rolling Stone.

Noel Murray of Rolling Stone ranked Daryl Dixon #2 in a list of 30 best Walking Dead characters, saying, "The Walking Dead is a show that traffics in iconography – and you do not get more iconographic than the show's scraggly-haired, crossbow-wielding, motorcycle-riding hunter. First introduced as an angry redneck and evolving into one of the series' most striking figures, Daryl has revealed more dimensions over time, and Norman Reedus' performance helping to expose an unsurpassed kindness and commitment to the hero's closest companions."
