= Christine Woods =

American actress (born 1983)

- Born: September 3, 1983 (age 42)
- Occupation: Actress
- Years active: 2005–present
- Children: 1

Christine Woods (born September 3, 1983) is an American actress who appeared in the HBO series Hello Ladies. She previously portrayed FBI Special Agent Janis Hawk in the ABC series FlashForward.

== Early life ==
Woods grew up in Lake Forest, California. She studied musical theater at the University of Arizona.

== Career ==
Woods starred in Perfect Couples, a half-hour romantic comedy that premiered in 2010. It was not renewed for a second season. She played police officer Dawn Lerner, in a major storyline, on three episodes in season 5 (2014) of the series The Walking Dead.

== Filmography ==
=== Film ===
Year	Title	Role	Notes
2007	The Haunting of Marsten Manor	Ericka	
2009	Sveener and the Shmiel	Traci	
2012	Franky and the Ant	Kare Bear	
2014	Hello Ladies: The Movie	Jessica	
2016	Dean	Michelle	
2017	I Don't Feel at Home in This World Anymore	Meredith	
2017	Handsome	Nora Vanderwheel	
2017	Home Again	Yoga Friend	
2018	Better Off Zed	Paige	
2019	Paddleton	Doctor Hagen	
2019	Imaginary Order	Gemma Jean	
2019	Stray	Murphy	

=== Television ===
Year	Title	Role	Notes
2005	CSI: Miami	Valerie Nelson	Episode: "Prey"
2006	The Game	Christine	Episode: "The Rules of the Game"
2007	How I Met Your Mother	Waitress	Episode: "Third Wheel"
2007	The Game	Sunbeam Girlfriend	Episode: "You Say You Want a Revolution"
2008	Welcome to The Captain	Claire	2 episodes
2008	House	Lou	Episode: "Dying Changes Everything"
2008	Cold Case	Cassie Michaels	Episode: "Street Money"
2008	NCIS	Rebecca Jennings	Episode: "Love & War"
2008	In Plain Sight	Gwen Jarvis	Episode: "One Night Stan"
2008	Mike Birbiglia's Secret Public Journal	Abby	Television film
2008	The Madness of Jane	Marie	Television film
2009–2010	FlashForward	Janis Hawk	18 episodes
2010–2011	Perfect Couples	Julia	13 episodes
2011	The Closer	Casey Watson	Episode: "You Have the Right to Remain Jolly"
2012	Castle	Leann West	Episode: "47 Seconds"
2012	How to Be a Gentleman	Melissa	Episode: "How to Be Shallow"
2012	Necessary Roughness	Lydia	Episode: "What's Eating You?"
2012–2013	Go On	Janie	5 episodes
2013	Hello Ladies	Jessica Vanderhoff	Main role
2014	Bad Teacher	Alex	Episode: "The Bottle"
2014	The Walking Dead	Officer Dawn Lerner	Season 5 (Recurring; 3 episodes)
2014	Hello Ladies: The Movie	Jessica Vanderhoff	TV movie finale of Hello Ladies
2015	Comedy Bang! Bang!	Diane	Episode: "Joseph Gordon-Levitt Wears a Heart T-Shirt and Blue Jeans"
2015	About a Boy	Liz	5 episodes
2015–2016	The Odd Couple	Ashley Unger	Recurring; 3 episodes
2016	The Catch	Rebecca Bloom	Episode: "The Real Killer"
2017	NCIS: New Orleans	SAT Com Specialist Bonnie Madigan	Episode: "Hell on the High Water"
2017	It's Always Sunny In Philadelphia	Mandy	Episode: "Dennis' Double Life"
2017	Life in Pieces	Alex	2 episodes "
2017–2018	Man with a Plan	Lisa McCaffrey	Recurring; 5 episodes
2018–2020	She-Ra and the Princesses of Power	Entrapta (voice)	Main role
2019	Brockmire	Maggie Nichols	4 episode
2019	Room 104	Roma	Episode: "The Plot"
2020–2022	Grace and Frankie	Jessica	10 episodes
2020	Stumptown	Claire Chesterfield	Episode: "Til Dex Do Us Part"
2020	Briarpatch	Lucretia Colder	5 episodes
2024	S.W.A.T.	Jenelle Wilson	Episode: "Hot Button"

== Awards and nominations ==
Year	Award	Category	Work	Result
2014	Maverick Movie Awards	Best Supporting Actress	Franky and the Ant	Nominated
2014	Claw Awards	Best Actress	Franky and the Ant	Nominated
2014	Wild Rose Independent Film Festival	Best Actress	Franky and the Ant	Nominated
2014	Zed Fest Film Festival	Outstanding Acting Performance	Franky and the Ant	Won
