= Midniters =

Midniters may refer to:

- Thee Midniters, an American Chicano rock group from the 1960s
- The Midnighters, an American rhythm and blues group from the 1950s, led by Hank Ballard

== See also ==
- Midnighters (disambiguation)
