= Homewrecker (disambiguation) =

A homewrecker is a person, object, or activity that causes the breakup of a marriage or similar relationship.

Homewrecker may also refer to:

== Film and television ==
=== Film ===
- Homewrecker, a 1992 American television film directed by Fred Walton
- Homewrecker, a 2009 American LGBTQ-related film
- Homewrecker, the "Best of NEXT" award-winner at the 2010 Sundance Film Festival
- Homewrecker (film), a 2020 Canadian comedy horror film directed by Zach Gayne
- Spider-Man: Home-Wrecker, an intentionally revealed false title for the 2021 film Spider-Man: No Way Home

=== Television ===
- Homewrecker (TV series), a 2005 American reality show

==== Episodes ====
- "Home Wrecker", a 2011 episode of American Dad!
- "Home Wreckers", a 2010 episode of How I Met Your Mother
- "Homewrecker" (The Closer), 2007
- "Homewrecker" (The Fairly OddParents), 2004
- "Homewrecker" (Lucifer), 2016
- "Homewrecker" (The Shield), 2003

== Food ==
- "Homewrecker Hot Dog", on the menu at Hillbilly Hot Dogs in Lesage, West Virginia
- "Homewrecker", a hot dog on the menu at Joseph P. Riley Jr. Park in Charleston, South Carolina, featured in season 2, episode 9 of Man v. Food

== Music ==
=== Albums ===
- Homewrecker, by Grey DeLisle, 2002
- Homewrecker, by Little Hurricane, 2011
- Homewrecker, an EP by Wires on Fire, 2004

=== Songs ===
- "Homewrecker" (Gretchen Wilson song), 2005
- "Homewrecker" (Sombr song), 2026
- "Homewrecker", by Converge from Jane Doe, 2001
- "Homewrecker", by hellogoodbye from Zombies! Aliens! Vampires! Dinosaurs!, 2006
- "Homewrecker!", by Jarvis Cocker from Further Complications, 2009
- "Homewrecker", by Marina and the Diamonds from Electra Heart, 2012
- "Homewrecker", by Nick Lowe from The Convincer, 2001
- "Homewrecker", by Sarge from The Glass Intact, 1998
- "Homewrecker", by Sisqó from Return of Dragon, 2001
- "Homewrecker", by Sophie Ellis-Bextor from Make a Scene, 2011
- "Homewrecker", by Styx from Edge of the Century, 1990
- "Homewrecker", by Thirsty Merc from First Work, 2003
