= Indican Pictures =

American entertainment company

- Type: Private
- Industry: Entertainment
- Founders: Randolph Kret; Shaun Hill
- Headquarters: Hollywood, California, United States
- Area served: Worldwide
- Key people: Randolph Kret
- Products: Films
- Website: www.indicanpictures.com

Indican Pictures is an American entertainment company and film distributor.

The company was founded by Randolph Kret and Shaun Hill.

Indican Pictures has distributed such films as The Boondock Saints, A Green Story, The Girl Next Door, Hybrid, Kill Me, Deadly, Unsullied, The Man Who Shook the Hand of Vicente Fernandez Man Underground, This Last Lonely Place, A Beginner's Guide to Snuff, Emoticon ;), The Grace of Jake, W.M.D. and Never.

== Movies ==
- The Boondock Saints (1999)
- The Brown Bunny (2003)
- Pink Zone (2014)
- Eternity: The Movie (2014)
- The Grace of Jake (2015)
- Just One More Kiss (2019)
- Perfect Skin (2018)
- A Very British Christmas (2019)
- Boiling Pot (2015)
- Sex and the Future (2020)
- Come Together (2008)
- The Lurker (2019)
- Shed of the Dead (2019)
- Who's Jenna...? (2018)
- American Terrorist (2020)
- Hollywould (2019)
- Terkel in Trouble (2004)
- Painless (2017)
- Blood Widow (2020)
- Intuitions (2019)
- Pure (2002)
- Lime Salted Love (2006)
- Six Hot Chicks in a Warehouse (2017)
- 100 Acres of Hell (2019)
- Jet Trash (2016)
- Sable (2017)
- Lost in America (2018)
- High on the Hog (2019)
- The Girl Next Door (1999)
- Before I Sleep (2013)
- Survivors Exposed (2001)
- Cruel World (2005)
- Massacre on Aisle 12 (2016)
- Infernum (2019)
- Crazy Lake (2016)
- Lore (2017)
- Strike (2018)
- Poor Boy (2016)
- Death Valley (2015)
- Jet Trash (2016)
- Kill Me, Deadly (2015)
- Virginia Minnesota (2018)
- A Beginner's Guide to Snuff (2016)
- Captain Sabertooth (2013)
- The Church (2018)
- On Line (2002)
- The Cabining (2014)
- 7 Witches (2017)
- The Samurai in Autumn (2016)
- Romeo & Juliet: Sealed with a Kiss (2006)
- Silver Star (2026)
- Swallowtail & Dragonfly (2026)
