= The Super (2017 film) =

American horror thriller film

- Film poster
- Directed by: Stephan Rick
- Written by: John J. McLaughlin
- Produced by: Brett Forbes; Patrick Rizzotti; Tom Thayer; Dick Wolf
- Starring: Val Kilmer
- Cinematography: Stefan Ciupek; Felix Cramer
- Edited by: Andrew Wesman
- Music by: Jens Grötzschel; Stefan Schulzki
- Production companies: Fortress Features; Wolf Films
- Distributed by: Saban Films
- Release date: October 14, 2017 (Sitges)
- Running time: 90 minutes
- Country: United States
- Language: English
- Budget: $2.3 million
- Box office: $19,513

The Super is a 2017 American horror thriller film directed by Stephan Rick and starring Patrick Flueger and Val Kilmer.

== Synopsis ==
Phil Lodge, a retired cop whose wife has recently died, takes a job in a large apartment building as one of three live-in superintendents. He has two daughters, 14-year-old Violet and 7-year-old Rose.

Prior to moving in, Violet's favorite teacher was murdered in the same apartment building. Soon after Phil begins work, a series of disappearances take place, and Rose develops a strange fascination with one of the other supers, Walter, who, in addition to being mysterious, also happens to dabble in black magic. Phil begins to suspect that Walter is behind the mysterious disappearances.

It is eventually revealed that Rose is Violet's twin sister, and she died alongside her mother. She appears to Phil as a ghost and leads him to commit the murders in the building; Phil's victims see Rose just before they die. Walter's experiments with black magic are attempts to get rid of Rose's ghost.

== Cast ==
- Patrick Flueger as Phil Lodge
- Taylor Richardson as Violet Lodge
- Mattea Conforti as Rose Lodge
- Val Kilmer as Walter
- Louisa Krause as Beverly
- Paul Ben-Victor as Mr. Johnson
- Yul Vazquez as Julio
- Alex Essoe as Ms. Daigle
- Luke Edwards as Brad
- Justine J. Hall as Sofia

== Production ==
On August 13, 2018, it was announced that Saban Films had acquired the rights to the film.

== Reception ==
On the review aggregator Rotten Tomatoes, the film holds an approval rating of 40%, based on 10 reviews, with an average rating of 4.9/10.

Noel Murray of the Los Angeles Times gave it a negative review but wrote, "Still, even bad horror movies can have their pleasures, and here it's Kilmer who gives The Super a kick." Maitland McDonagh of Film Journal International reviewed it positively, writing, "How surprising the story's twist ending turns out to be depends on how thoroughly steeped in horror moves the viewer is, but it's well executed down to small details like the creepy clown puzzle with which little Rose likes to play." Frank Scheck of The Hollywood Reporter also gave it a good review, writing that "it offers a few decent scares as well as the opportunity for Val Kilmer to once again display his unique brand of screen charisma."
