= Davis Rules =

- Genre: Sitcom
- Created by: Danny Jacobson; Norma Safford Vela
- Written by: Kim C. Friese; Danny Jacobson; Frank Mula; Fredi Towbin; Norma Safford Vela
- Directed by: John Bowab; Ellen Falcon; James Widdoes
- Starring: Randy Quaid; Patricia Clarkson; Tamayo Otsuki; Trevor Bullock; Luke Edwards; Nathan Watt; Jonathan Winters; Bonnie Hunt; Vonni Ribisi; Debra Mooney
- Composer: Mark Mothersbaugh
- Country of origin: United States
- Original language: English
- No. of seasons: 2
- No. of episodes: 29

Production
- Executive producers: Marcy Carsey; Danny Jacobson; Caryn Mandabach; Tom Werner; Norma Safford Vela; Douglas Wyman; Randy Quaid
- Producers: Dale McRaven; Frank Mula; Jon Spector; Fredi Towbin
- Camera setup: Multi-camera
- Running time: 22–24 minutes
- Production company: Carsey-Werner Productions

Original release
- Network: ABC
- Release: January 27 – April 9, 1991
- Network: CBS
- Release: December 30, 1991 – May 13, 1992

Davis Rules is an American sitcom broadcast on ABC in 1991 and on CBS in 1992. The series was produced by Carsey-Werner Productions.

== Synopsis ==
The series stars Randy Quaid as Dwight Davis, a widowed elementary school principal outside of Seattle, Washington who is raising his three sons (Robbie, Charlie, and Ben) with the help of his wacky father Gunny Davis (Jonathan Winters).

== Cast ==
=== Main ===
- Randy Quaid as Dwight Davis
- Patricia Clarkson as Cosmo Yeargin (season 1)
- Tamayo Otsuki as Mrs. Elaine Yamagami
- Trevor Bullock as Robbie Davis (season 1)
- Luke Edwards as Charlie Davis
- Nathan Watt as Ben Davis
- Jonathan Winters as Gunny Davis
- Bonnie Hunt as Gwen Davis (season 2)
- Vonni Ribisi as Skinner Buckley (season 2)
- Debra Mooney as Mrs. Rush (recurring: season 1; main: season 2)

=== Recurring ===
- Rigoberto Jimenez as Rigo Cordona (season 1)
- Debra Jo Rupp as Ms. Higgins (season 1)

== Production ==
Davis Rules was canceled by ABC after less than one season despite having premiered after Super Bowl XXV. ABC aired it as a midseason replacement. When the series wasn't used in ABC's fall lineup, CBS bought the series in November 1991.

CBS retooled the series, adding Bonnie Hunt and Giovanni Ribisi (credited as Vonni Ribisi), but canceled it after 16 episodes.

== Episodes ==
=== Series overview ===
| Season | Episodes | Originally released | | |
| Season | Episodes | First released | Last released | Network |
|---|---|---|---|---|
| 1 | 13 | January 27, 1991 | April 9, 1991 | ABC |
| 2 | 16 | December 30, 1991 | May 13, 1992 | CBS |

=== Season 1 (1991) ===
Every episode of season 1 was directed by Ellen Falcon.

List of Davis Rules season 1 episodes
| No. overall | No. in season | Title | Original release date | Prod. code | Viewers (millions) |
|---|---|---|---|---|---|
| 1 | 1 | "A Man for All Reasons" | January 27, 1991 | 101 | 26.7 |
| 2 | 2 | "Rules of the Game" | January 29, 1991 | 105 | 23.6 |
| 3 | 3 | "The Trouble with Women" | February 5, 1991 | 106 | 20.8 |
| 4 | 4 | "Guys and Dolls" | February 12, 1991 | 107 | 21.1 |
| 5 | 5 | "Pomahac Day Massacre" | February 19, 1991 | 108 | 22.0 |
| 6 | 6 | "Yes, I'm The Great Pretender" | February 26, 1991 | 109 | 21.2 |
| 7 | 7 | "Gimme The Ball" | March 5, 1991 | 110 | 22.0 |
| 8 | 8 | "Twisted Sister" | March 5, 1991 | 112 | 24.5 |
| 9 | 9 | "Take This Job and Love It" | March 12, 1991 | 102 | 24.4 |
| 10 | 10 | "Sign of the Times" | March 19, 1991 | 111 | 20.1 |
| 11 | 11 | "Habla Espanol?" | March 26, 1991 | 103 | 21.0 |
| 12 | 12 | "Mission: Improbable" | April 2, 1991 | 113 | 22.9 |
| 13 | 13 | "Soap" | April 9, 1991 | 104 | 18.4 |

=== Season 2 (1991–92) ===
The first thirteen episodes of season 2 were directed by James Widdoes, while the final three episodes were directed by John Bowab.

List of Davis Rules season 2 episodes
| No. overall | No. in season | Title | Original release date | Prod. code | Viewers (millions) |
|---|---|---|---|---|---|
| 14 | 1 | "They're Writing Songs of Love, But Nun for Me" | December 30, 1991 | 201 | 19.4 |
| 15 | 2 | "A Father Makes All the Difference" | January 1, 1992 | 204 | 22.2 |
| 16 | 3 | "Writing a Wrong" | January 8, 1992 | 202 | 16.9 |
| 17 | 4 | "The Moment of Youth" | January 15, 1992 | 211 | 15.3 |
| 18 | 5 | "Love at First Sighting (Part 1)" | January 22, 1992 | 207 | 14.1 |
| 19 | 6 | "Love at First Sighting (Part 2)" | January 29, 1992 | 208 | 15.9 |
| 20 | 7 | "Gunny's Ex" | February 5, 1992 | 205 | 14.8 |
| 21 | 8 | "Happy as a Clam" | February 26, 1992 | 209 | 13.4 |
| 22 | 9 | "Someone to Watch Over Them" | March 4, 1992 | 212 | 14.2 |
| 23 | 10 | "Bells, Bells, Bells" | March 11, 1992 | 206 | 13.2 |
| 24 | 11 | "Strike Down the Band" | March 18, 1992 | 210 | 13.9 |
| 25 | 12 | "Everybody Comes to Nick's" | March 25, 1992 | 213 | 13.8 |
| 26 | 13 | "A Foggy Day on Puget Sound" | April 8, 1992 | 203 | 12.7 |
| 27 | 14 | "Ferry Tale" | April 22, 1992 | 214 | 12.4 |
| 28 | 15 | "Brother Can You Spare a Dime" | May 6, 1992 | 215 | 10.9 |
| 29 | 16 | "The Girl with Someone Extra" | May 13, 1992 | 216 | 10.0 |

== Awards and nominations ==
Winters won an Emmy for his role as Gunny Davis, while Trevor Bullock and Robin Lynn Heath also won Young Artist Awards for their roles in the series.

| Year | Award | Category | Recipient | Result |
|---|---|---|---|---|
| 1991 | Emmy Award | Outstanding Supporting Actor in a Comedy Series | Jonathan Winters | Won |
| 1992 | Emmy Award | Outstanding Individual Achievement in Lighting Direction (Electronic) for a Comedy Series | Jo Mayer (Lighting designer) (for episode "A Foggy Day On Puget Sound") | Nominated |
| 1992 | Young Artist Award | Best New Family Television Series | Davis Rules | Nominated |
| 1992 | Young Artist Award | Best Young Actor Starring in a New Television Series | Trevor Bullock | Won |
| 1992 | Young Artist Award | Best Young Actor Co-starring in a Television Series | Rigoberto Jimenez | Nominated |
| 1992 | Young Artist Award | Best Young Actress Guest Starring or Recurring Role in a TV Series | Robin Lynn Heath | Won |
