= Melissa Bolona =

American actress and model

Melissa Boloña
- Born: December 28, 1989 (age 36); Greenwich, Connecticut, U.S.A.
- Occupations: Actress, Entrepreneur
- Years active: 2013–present
- Height: 175 cm (5 ft 9 in)

Melissa Boloña (born December 28, 1989) is an American actress and model. She starred in the films Acts of Violence, The Hurricane Heist, Malicious, and Dog Eat Dog.

== Early life and education ==
Boloña was born in Connecticut, and grew up in New Jersey; she went into acting at the age of twelve. Her mother took her to acting classes when she was young, but she took a hiatus in order to focus on her education. Boloña began taking acting more seriously while studying international marketing in Paris, enrolling in acting classes which she continued while studying for her degree. Upon graduation, she began pursuing acting as a profession.

== Career ==
Boloña's acting debut was in the movies of the week Grace of God and The Saint. In the summer of 2015 she had her feature film debut as the supporting female lead in the theatrical release of In Stereo. She has continued her acting career regularly appearing in films since, most recently as Lisa in The Final Wish.

Boloña has modeled for numerous magazines. She became a model for Beach Bunny Swimwear in 2013 after beating out 20,000 others in a model search. She appeared in campaigns for the brand which were shot alongside Irina Shayk. She has appeared on numerous magazine covers, most recently for Vanidades.

See is the founder of Beauty & the Broth, a line of bone broths and vegan broth.

== Filmography ==
=== Film ===
Year	Title	Role
2014	Grace of God	Cindy
2015	Unarmed Forces	Claire
2015	To Whom It May Concern	Jess
2015	Shark Lake	Sara
2015	In Stereo	Jennifer
2016	I'll Be Home for Christmas	Mrs. Ellis
2016	The Saint	Guest star
2016	Pair of Jacks	Mrs. Ellis
2016	The Neighbor	Sarah
2016	I Am Wrath	News Reporter
2016	Frat Pack	Amy
2016	Dog Eat Dog	Lina
2016	Cops and Robbers	News Reporter
2016	Billy Boy	Jules
2017	The Year of Spectacular Men	Amythyst Stone
2017	The Super	Dixie
2017	Juvenile	Jules
2017	The Institute	Trudy
2018	Malicious	Becky
2018	Acts of Violence	Mia
2018	The Hurricane Heist	Sasha Van Dietrich
2018	Mara	Carly
2019	The Final Wish	Lisa
2020	Becoming	Annie Hemming

=== Television ===
Year	Title	Role
2013	Two Sides of Me	Herself
2014	When Calls the Heart	Sarah
2014	Fox NFL Sunday	Herself
2016	Flower Shop Mystery: Snipped in the Bud	Poppy Kirvoy
2020	The Expanding Universe of Ashley Garcia	Date

=== Philanthropy ===
Bolona was recognized by The New York Observer as a leading young philanthropist in 2015.
