= Little Big League =

1994 film directed by Andrew Scheinman

- Theatrical release poster
- Directed by: Andrew Scheinman
- Written by: Gregory K. Pincus
- Produced by: Steven Nicolaides; Andrew Bergman; Mike Lobell
- Starring: Luke Edwards; Timothy Busfield; John Ashton; Ashley Crow; Kevin Dunn; Jason Robards
- Cinematography: Donald E. Thorin
- Edited by: Michael Jablow
- Music by: Stanley Clarke
- Production companies: Castle Rock Entertainment; Lobell/Bergman Productions
- Distributed by: Columbia Pictures
- Release date: June 29, 1994
- Running time: 119 minutes
- Country: United States
- Language: English
- Budget: $20 million (US)
- Box office: $12 million (US)

Little Big League is a 1994 American family sports comedy film about a 12-year-old who suddenly becomes the owner and then manager of the Minnesota Twins baseball team. It stars Luke Edwards, Timothy Busfield, and Ashley Crow. The film is director Andrew Scheinman's first and only feature film directorial project.

Little Big League was released by Columbia Pictures on June 29, 1994. The film received mixed to negative reviews from critics and underperformed at the box office, grossing $12 million against a $20 million budget.

== Plot ==
12-year-old Billy Heywood is a Little League Baseball player whose grandfather, Thomas Heywood, owns the Minnesota Twins. When Thomas dies, Billy learns that he is now the owner of the Twins. Thomas' will specifies that the team executives are to help Billy until he is old enough to run the team by himself.

Billy quickly runs afoul of the team manager, George O'Farrell. Billy believes O'Farrell is too hard on the players, while O'Farrell despises the idea of working for a kid. After O'Farrell repeatedly insults Billy, he fires him.

With no other managers willing to work for a kid, and with summer break starting in two days, Billy decides to name himself the new manager. He reaches out to the Commissioner of Baseball, who approves after consulting with Jenny, Billy's mother. The players are very skeptical, but Billy promises that if he does not improve the team's last-place position in the standings within a few weeks, he will resign. The team quickly moves up to division race contention. Unfortunately, not all is going smoothly for Billy, as his friend and star first baseman Lou Collins takes a romantic interest in his widowed mother Jenny.

Billy picks up bad habits on the road, especially when he gets ejected from a game and a one-game "suspension" by Jenny for swearing at an umpire because of a call he didn't like. He is troubled when he must release his personal favorite Twins player, Jerry Johnson, who is in the twilight of his career; Billy's awkward handling of the situation ends up making Jerry feel even worse.

Throughout the season, the pressures of managing the team begin to wear Billy down and consume his free time. His friends do not like how his managerial responsibilities are keeping him away from being with them. Even when he's physically present (as opposed to on the road with the team), he is typically distracted by team business.

After Jenny spends her birthday with Lou rather than Billy, Billy uses Lou's minor batting-slump as an excuse to bench him, sending the Twins into a losing skid. Billy later tells Jenny that he's tired of being a "grown-up" and decides to quit as manager after the end of the season, even reinstating Lou to starter on first base.

With four games left, the Twins trail the Seattle Mariners by four games in the wild card race. The Twins win their last four while the Mariners lose four straight, forcing a One-game playoff at the Twins' Hubert H. Humphrey Metrodome to determine who advances to the postseason.

The two teams trade three-run home runs during the course of the game, and extra innings are required. The Mariners eventually take the lead. Down to their final out, and Lou about to go up to bat, he tells Billy that he has asked Jenny to marry him, and that her reply was "Ask Billy". With a runner on base, Billy says if Lou hits the game-winning homer he will give his blessing, but quickly relents and gives Lou his consent whether or not he hits a homer. Facing Randy Johnson, Lou hits a long fly ball to center field, but Ken Griffey Jr. makes a leaping catch at the wall to rob Lou of a homer and end the game.

With their season over, Billy tells the players he is officially stepping down as manager, with pitching coach Mac MacNally taking his place, as well as bringing back Jerry to be the third base coach and new hitting instructor. The players object to losing Billy, but he reminds the team that he will still be present as the owner, and says that he might come back as manager if junior high doesn't work out. When being informed that none of the fans have left, Billy, along with the rest of the team, returns to the field to receive a standing ovation.

== Cast ==
- Luke Edwards as Billy Heywood (manager - #20)
- Timothy Busfield as Lou Collins (first base - #4)
- John Ashton as Mac Macnally (pitching coach - #56)
- Ashley Crow as Jenny Heywood
- Kevin Dunn as Arthur Goslin (general manager)
- Billy L. Sullivan as Chuck
- Miles Feulner as Joey
- Jonathan Silverman as Jim Bowers (relief pitcher - #49)
- Duane Davis as Jerry Johnson (right field/Designated Hitter - #31)
- Bradley Jay Lesley as John (Blackout) Gatling (relief pitcher - #38)
- Scott Patterson as Mike McGrevey (starting pitcher - #19)
- John Minch as Mark Hodges (catcher - #12)
- Antonio Lewis Todd as Mickey Scales (second base - #11)
- Joseph Latimore as Lonnie Ritter (left field - #24)
- Kevin Elster as Pat Corning (shortstop - #2)
- Michael Papajohn as Tucker Kain (right field - #5)
- Wolfgang Bodison as Spencer Hamilton (center field - #34)
- Leon "Bull" Durham as Leon Alexander (first base - #23)
- Troy Startoni as Larry Hilbert (third base - #15)
- Teddy Bergman as Lowell
- John Gordon as Wally Holland (play-by-play)
- Dennis Farina as George O'Farrell
- Jason Robards as Thomas Heywood

=== MLB personalities as themselves ===
- Ken Griffey Jr.
- Lou Piniella
- Mickey Tettleton
- Iván Rodríguez
- Sandy Alomar Jr.
- Eric Anthony
- Carlos Baerga
- Alex Fernandez
- Randy Johnson
- Wally Joyner
- Dave Magadan
- Lenny Webster
- Paul O'Neill
- Rafael Palmeiro
- Dean Palmer
- Tim Raines
- Chris Berman

Actor Kevin Elster was an active MLB player when the film was shot, while two of his fictional Twins teammates were played by former MLB players Leon Durham and Brad Lesley. John Gordon, who plays the fictional announcer Wally Holland, was the actual radio announcer for the Twins from 1987 through 2011, and was elected into the club's Hall of Fame in 2016.

Ashley Crow's son, Pete Crow-Armstrong, eventually became a major-leaguer himself for the Chicago Cubs.

Today's Major League Baseball rules prohibit a manager from having any ownership stake in a team. That had happened earlier, when Emil Fuchs owned the Boston Braves and tried to save money by managing the team himself, without any success. The best known example was Connie Mack, who was part-owner of the Philadelphia Athletics, but assumed sole ownership after the death of Ben Shibe. Mack served as the manager of the Athletics for fifty years. This record is now deemed unbeatable, since the ownership rule was passed after Mack died. The most recent example was an attempt by Atlanta Braves owner Ted Turner to manage the team in 1977. He did so for only one game (a 2–1 loss) before being informed that he was not eligible.

== Reception ==
The film has a score of 35% on Rotten Tomatoes, based on 20 reviews. On Metacritic, the film has a score of 57 out of 100 based on 20 reviews, indicating "mixed or average" reviews. In his three-and-a-half star review, Roger Ebert gave the film praise for being a family movie that doesn't dumb down for its audience or feel predictable.

== Year-end lists ==
- Honorable mention – David Elliott, The San Diego Union-Tribune

== Sexual abuse allegations ==
In 1996, Timothy Busfield settled a lawsuit for an undisclosed amount after it was alleged he sexually abused one of the film's 17-year-old extras.

== See also ==
- List of baseball films
