= Luke Edwards (actor) =

American actor

- Born: Nevada City, California, USA
- Occupations: Actor; filmmaker
- Years active: 1988–present
- Notable work: The Wizard (1989 film)|Little Big League|Newsies

Luke Edwards is an American actor and filmmaker. He began his career as a child actor, portraying Steven Stayner in the NBC television miniseries I Know My First Name is Steven (1989) before his breakout with a supporting role in the adventure film The Wizard (1989).

In the 1990s, Edwards had main roles as Jason Walker on the Fox sitcom Molloy (1990) and Charlie Davis on the ABC and CBS sitcom Davis Rules (1991–1992). He had the lead role in the sports film Little Big League (1994), which earned him a nomination for the Saturn Award for Best Performance by a Younger Actor, and supporting roles in the films Guilty by Suspicion (1991) and Newsies (1992). He had a starring role in the thriller film Mother's Boys (1993).

In later years, Edwards starred in the HBO television film Cheaters (2000) and had supporting roles in the horror films Jeepers Creepers 2 (2003) and The Super (2017). He had starring roles in the horror films The Neighbor (2016) and Malicious (2018), and produced and starred in A Beginner's Guide to Snuff (2016).

== Career ==
Edwards began his film career with an appearance on the ABC anthology television series ABC Afterschool Special (1988), in the episode "Tattle: When to Tell on a Friend." The next year, he had a supporting role opposite Fred Savage in the film The Wizard (1989). His next supporting film roles were in Guilty by Suspicion (1991) and Newsies (1992), along with main roles as Jason Walker on the Fox sitcom Molloy (1990) and Charlie Davis on the ABC and CBS sitcom Davis Rules (1991–1992).

Edwards had the lead role in the 1994 sports film Little Big League, which earned him a nomination for the Saturn Award for Best Performance by a Younger Actor. He had a recurring role as Mark on season 1 of the MTV anthology series Undressed (1999), and a supporting role in the film Jeepers Creepers 2 (2003). Edwards had a cameo role in American Pie 2 (2001).

In 2012, Edwards starred on the comedy web series The Stooges. He produced and starred in the film Little Paradise (2015). In July 2014, Edwards was honored at a Minnesota Twins game to celebrate the 20th anniversary of the release of Little Big League.

In September 2014, Edwards was cast in a lead role in the horror comedy film A Beginner's Guide to Snuff, which was released in 2016. He also produced the film, and his performance was praised by critics. Later, Edwards starred in the horror films The Neighbor (2016) and Malicious (2018). In October 2018, he was cast in a supporting role in the crime film Adverse, which was released in 2020.

In July 2024, Edwards was cast in the crime television series A Motel.

== Filmography ==
=== Film ===
Year	Title	Role	Notes
1989	The Wizard	Jimmy	
1991	Not of This World	Billy Fletcher	Television film
1991	Guilty by Suspicion	Paulie Merrell	
1992	Newsies	Les Jacobs	
1993	Mother's Boys	Kes	
1994	The Yarn Princess	Daniel Thomas	Television film
1994	Little Big League	Billy Heywood	
1996	The Little Riders	Paul Petersen	Television film
2000	Cheaters	Darius Bettus	Television film
2001	American Pie 2	High School Guy	
2002	Shadow Realm	Wes	Television film
2003	Jeepers Creepers 2	Jack Taggart Jr.	
2004	Debating Robert Lee	Michael Holland	
2010	Special Ops	Techie	
2013	Crosshairs	Grandie	
2014	Stranglehold	Frank Hardy	
2015	1st Date	Brian Adams	
2015	Little Paradise	Ken	Also producer
2016	A Beginner's Guide to Snuff	Dominic Winters	Also producer
2016	The Neighbor	Cooper	
2016	Quarries	Mitchell	
2017	A Deadly Affair	Trevor	Television film
2017	The Super	Brad	
2018	Malicious	James Harper	
2020	Adverse	Kyle	
2020	Serpent in the Bottle	Trent Harris	
2023	The Trip	Sam Watson	Also producer
2026	A Crime Story		

=== Television ===
Year	Title	Role	Notes
1988	ABC Afterschool Special	Jack	Episode: "Tattle: When to Tell on a Friend"
1989	21 Jump Street	Young Hanson	Episode: "Woolly Bullies"
1989	I Know My First Name is Steven	Steven Stayner (age 7)	Miniseries
1989	Roseanne	Lonnie Anderson	2 episodes
1990	Molloy	Jason Walker	7 episodes
1990	Parker Lewis Can't Lose	Young Jerry	Episode: "Science Fair"
1991–1992	Davis Rules	Charlie Davis	29 episodes
1992	Human Target	Sam	2 episodes
1999	Undressed	Mark	6 episodes
2000	Strange World		Episode: "Age of Reason"
2002	Night Visions	Wes	Episode: "The Maze / Harmony"
2007	Without a Trace	Ian Hewitt	Episode: "Primed"
2007	Close to Home	Matthew Simmons	Episode: "Protégé"
2008	Privileged	Sammy	Episode: "All About Overcompensating"
2010	Three Rivers	Bobby	Episode: "Case Histories"
2012	The Stooges	Mikhail	7 episodes; web series
2015	True Detective	Lenny Tyler	2 episodes
2019	NCIS	Tommy "Peaches" Mulligan	Episode: "The Last Link"
2020; 2022	Surf Guard	Hot Dog Hank	3 episodes; also producer (15 episodes) and director (2 episodes)
2023	Underdeveloped	Johnny Darrow	Episode: "Cowman"

== Awards and nominations ==
Year	Award	Category	Nominated work	Result
1990	Youth in Film Awards	Best Young Actor Supporting Role in a Motion Picture	The Wizard	Nominated
1993	Youth in Film Awards	Outstanding Young Ensemble Cast in a Motion Picture	Newsies	Nominated
1995	Youth in Film Awards	Best Performance by a Youth Ensemble in a Motion Picture	Little Big League	Nominated
1995	Saturn Awards	Best Performance by a Younger Actor	Little Big League	Nominated
