= Michael John Roberts =

Canadian television director, producer and animator (1977–2026)

- Born: December 20, 1977; Toronto, Ontario, Canada
- Died: November 11, 2026 (aged 48); Los Angeles, California, U.S.
- Education: Sheridan College
- Occupations: Director; producer; animator
- Years active: 2001–2026
- Spouse: Bree Williamson (m. 2008)

Michael John Roberts (December 20, 1977 – November 11, 2026) was a Canadian television director, producer and animator.

== Life and career ==
Michael John Roberts was born in Toronto, Canada, on December 20, 1977. He studied animation at Sheridan College. His first role was an animator on The Hoobs. He was known for his work on TripTank, F Is for Family, and BoJack Horseman.

Roberts was married to actress Bree Williamson, with whom he had one son. He died from glioblastoma in Los Angeles, on November 11, 2026, at the age of 48.
