= Guilty by Suspicion =

1991 film by Irwin Winkler

- Theatrical release poster
- Directed by: Irwin Winkler
- Written by: Irwin Winkler
- Produced by: Arnon Milchan
- Starring: Robert De Niro; Annette Bening; George Wendt; Patricia Wettig; Sam Wanamaker
- Cinematography: Michael Ballhaus
- Edited by: Priscilla Nedd
- Music by: James Newton Howard
- Production company: Fear No Evil Productions
- Distributed by: Warner Bros.
- Release date: March 15, 1991
- Running time: 105 minutes
- Country: United States
- Language: English
- Budget: $13 million
- Box office: $9.48 million

Guilty by Suspicion is a 1991 American period drama film about the Hollywood blacklist, McCarthyism and the activities of the House Un-American Activities Committee. Written and directed by Irwin Winkler in his directorial debut, the film stars Robert De Niro, Annette Bening and George Wendt. The character of David Merrill is inspired by the experiences of John Berry during the Hollywood blacklist era.

Guilty by Suspicion was released by Warner Bros. on March 15, 1991. The film received positive reviews from critics but underperformed at the box office, grossing $9.48 million against a $13 million budget. The film was entered into the 1991 Cannes Film Festival.

== Plot ==
David Merrill, a successful director in 1950s Hollywood, returns from film-location scouting abroad to find that a rising tide of McCarthyism and the Red Scare is creating havoc among his colleagues in the film industry.

His friend Larry Nolan is forced to name to the FBI and Congressional Oversight Committee the many people in Hollywood who are potentially associated with the communist movement. Nolan names several friends and colleagues such as Merrill as collaborators. Although most of them have tangential relations to the actual United States Communist Party, Washington, D.C., forces Hollywood executives such as mogul Darryl Zanuck to convince his directors and support staff to disavow communism, agree to perjure themselves in congressional hearings, and name other Hollywood influencers as communist agents.

Merrill is asked by Hollywood legal consultant Felix Graff to cooperate with FBI agents to cite four names, including screenwriter and childhood friend Bunny Baxter, as communists to Congress. If not, he will not be allowed to work again in the film industry. By refusing, Merrill is blacklisted from Hollywood and quickly loses his assets. Unable to pay alimony to his ex-wife Ruth and son, Merrill tries his luck across the country in New York City. He is initially well received by past colleagues, but is eventually convinced by FBI agents and Merrill's friends on Broadway to abandon him as well.

Merrill retreats to Los Angeles and rekindles his friendship with Ruth while he stays in her apartment. She has sold her home and has restarted her teaching career in elementary school. Despite losing all his money, the family dynamic improves with his constant presence in his son's life.

Meanwhile, Dorothy Nolan, actress and Larry's estranged wife, has a mental breakdown. Her refusal to cooperate with the FBI has led to her losing custody of her son. When she discovers that Merrill cannot offer her a job on Broadway because of his failed dealings with New York producers, a distraught Dorothy drives her car off a cliff to her death.

Things begin to improve when Merrill receives a phone call from a B-movie director to pick up the pieces of his failing Western. After successfully improving the film's direction and artistry, the FBI again tracks down Merrill and has him removed from the film.

Bunny Baxter is also in a situation because in his youth, he attended communist rallies but did not mention it to the FBI. That has put him in the position of perjury, and the inquiry board has threatened him with extensive jail time unless he also names Hollywood associates as Communists. Bunny begs Merrill to allow his name to be "thrown under the bus" because he is "already dead", but Ruth kicks him out of the house in disgust.

Merrill decides to contact Zanuck's lawyer Graff again after Zanuck begs him to concede to the Congressional requirements to name conspirators in the Communist party. Speaking to Graff, it is assumed that Merrill is broken and will cooperate with Congress in Washington, D.C., to resurrect his career. At the hearing, under much derision from the committee, Merrill again backtracks and refuses to discuss anyone aside from himself, which causes a fracas in the room. The committee cites him with contempt of Congress, which leads to others being sent to prison for years. As he leaves, Bunny takes his place at the witness stand and also refuses to cooperate with the demand that he name his colleagues as conspirators.

== Cast ==
- Robert De Niro as David Merrill
- Annette Bening as Ruth Merrill
- George Wendt as Bunny Baxter
- Patricia Wettig as Dorothy Nolan
- Sam Wanamaker as Felix Graff
- Luke Edwards as Paulie Merrill
- Chris Cooper as Larry Nolan
- Ben Piazza as Darryl F. Zanuck
- Martin Scorsese as Joe Lesser
- Barry Primus as Bert Alan
- Gailard Sartain as Chairman John Stephens Wood
- Robin Gammell as Frank S. Tavenner Jr.
- Brad Sullivan as Congressman Harold H. Velde
- Tom Sizemore as Ray Karlin
- Stuart Margolin as Abe Barron
- Roxann Biggs as Felicia Barron
- Barry Tubb as Jerry Cooper
- Adam Baldwin as FBI Agent #1

== Reception ==
The film opened to positive reviews and earned praise for Robert De Niro's performance.

Roger Ebert of the Chicago Sun-Times gave the film three-and-a-half stars out of four, and wrote that the film "teaches a lesson we are always in danger of forgetting: that the greatest service we can do our country is to be true to our conscience".

On Rotten Tomatoes, it holds a rating of 65% from 20 reviews. Metacritic gave the film a weighted average score of 64 out of 100, based on 23 critics, indicating "generally favorable" reviews.

Audiences polled by CinemaScore gave the film an average grade of "C+" on an A+ to F scale.
