= Acts of Violence =

2018 film by Brett Donowho

- Film poster
- Directed by: Brett Donowho
- Written by: Nicolas Aaron Mezzanatto
- Produced by: Randall Emmett; George Furla; Anthony Callie; Mark Stewart
- Starring: Bruce Willis; Cole Hauser; Shawn Ashmore; Ashton Holmes; Melissa Bolona; Sophia Bush; Mike Epps
- Cinematography: Edd Lukas
- Edited by: Ryan Easton; Frederick Wardell
- Production companies: Grindstone Entertainment Group; Emmett/Furla/Oasis Films
- Distributed by: Lionsgate Premiere
- Release date: January 12, 2018 (United States)
- Running time: 88 minutes
- Country: United States
- Language: English
- Box office: $386,790

Acts of Violence is a 2018 American action thriller film directed by Brett Donowho, starring Bruce Willis, Cole Hauser, Shawn Ashmore, Ashton Holmes, Melissa Bolona, Sophia Bush, and Mike Epps. It was written by Nicolas Aaron Mezzanatto.

The film was released in a limited theatrical engagement and on video-on-demand by Lionsgate Premiere on January 12, 2018, and received highly negative reviews from critics.

== Plot ==
The film focuses on the lives of the McGregor brothers in Cleveland. Two of the brothers, Deklan and Brandon, both served as U.S. Army Rangers and deployed overseas. The youngest of them, Roman, is engaged to his childhood girlfriend, Mia. While Deklan is traumatized by his past and Brandon has a family to look after, Mia and Roman party before their wedding. During her bachelorette party, Mia insults two thugs, Vince and Frank, who work as sex traffickers for a local kingpin named Max Livingston. They abduct her from the club and take her to their boss. In the meantime, Detective James Avery relentlessly tries to collect evidence against Max Livingston but fails to find anything legitimate. The existing corruption in the police department keeps his hands tied.

Before being abducted, Mia leaves a voice note for Roman explaining the situation. Roman calls Deklan and asks him for help. Deklan makes a 911 call. Because Mia's phone has Find My Phone technology, the brothers raid a home in which Deklan suspects Mia is being kept, but Mia is not there. They go to Avery, who promises to help them rescue her but warns them to stay out of the case but they refuse to comply with this request. Frank and Vince taunt Mia in the cell she is being held in. Mia kicks and bites them and runs down the corridor but is stopped by Livingston. He's displeased that Frank and Vince have taken someone who could be highlighted as a missing person. Livington forces a gun into Mia's hand and holds her finger on the trigger to kill Frank.

The three brothers equip themselves with military-grade vests and weapons and capture Vince who tells them where Mia is being held. After killing a number of Livington's men they arrive to find Mia has escaped through a window. Mia is later picked up again by the gang because of an implant tag. The brothers return to Brandon's home to find a ransacked house and his wife Jessa tied up dead. Further enraged, they head out to raid a warehouse in which Livington is hiding the trafficked women in trucks before sending them to Las Vegas. They rescue Mia, along with the other women. Settling back at the house, Livingston shows up with his men, attacking the brothers and Brandon is shot and dies as Livingston flees the scene before Deklan can take him down. Deklan and Roman are arrested by the police, but Livingston walks free. As a result Avery resigns from his job as a detective. He then heads over to Livingston's secret hideout and shoots him before he can leave town.

== Cast ==
- Bruce Willis as Detective James Avery
- Cole Hauser as Deklan MacGregor
- Shawn Ashmore as Brandon MacGregor
- Ashton Holmes as Roman MacGregor
- Melissa Bolona as Mia
- Sean Brosnan as Vince
- Sophia Bush as Detective Brooke Baker
- Mike Epps as Max Livington
- Tiffany Brouwer as Jessa MacGregor
- Jenna B. Kelly as Haley
- Patrick St. Esprit as Hemland
- Rotimi as Frank
- Matthew T. Metzler as Richard
- Kyle Stefanski as Davis
- Boyd Kestner as Stevens
- Brian Foster as young Brandon

== Production ==
Principal photography began in Cleveland, Ohio, in March 2017, including aerial shots of the Old Central Police Station.

== Release ==
Acts of Violence was released in a limited theatrical engagement and on video-on-demand by Lionsgate Premiere on January 12, 2018. The film grossed $386,790 in the United Arab Emirates and Portugal.

== Reception ==
On the review aggregator website Rotten Tomatoes, 0% of 13 critics' reviews are positive, with an average rating of 2.6/10. Metacritic, which uses a weighted average, assigned the film a score of 28 out of 100, based on 6 critics, indicating "generally unfavorable" reviews.
