= Still (The Walking Dead) =

- The Walking Dead episode
- Beth Greene attempts to find her first real drink of alcohol in the dark.
- Episode no.: Season 4 Episode 12
- Directed by: Julius Ramsay
- Written by: Angela Kang
- Cinematography by: Michael Satrazemis
- Editing by: Avi Youabian
- Original air date: March 2, 2014

Episode chronology
← Previous "Claimed"	Next → "Alone"
- The Walking Dead season 4

"Still" is the twelfth episode of the fourth season of the post-apocalyptic horror television series The Walking Dead, which aired on AMC on March 2, 2014. The episode was written by Angela Kang and directed by Julius Ramsay.

Daryl Dixon (Norman Reedus) and Beth Greene (Emily Kinney) explore the woods, coming across a country club and an old cabin Daryl had previously discovered, where they drink moonshine and learn more personal information about each other. It is the first episode of the series to feature only two of the main characters, both of whom happen to have no comic counterparts.

== Plot ==
Daryl and Beth have spent the night hiding in an abandoned car, some time after fleeing the prison. After some days of traveling, Beth tells Daryl she wants to take a drink of alcohol, something her father Hershel refused to allow her to do it. Daryl doesn't respond, and she storms off on her own but runs into a group of walkers. Daryl comes to rescue her and takes her back to camp, though Beth later says she could take care of herself. As they travel, they come to a country club. Defending themselves from walkers while working through the corpses in the pro shop and clubhouse, they eventually make it to the bar, where Beth finds a half-filled bottle of peach schnapps. She asks Daryl if it's good, and he says, "No." While Daryl plays darts with pictures of club members on the wall, Beth considers drinking but begins crying instead. Daryl then takes and smashes the bottle, telling her it is no good and that if she is going to have a first drink, it needs to be something better than that.

They leave the clubhouse for a rundown house Daryl had found earlier while with Michonne. After securing the area, he brings out a case of moonshine for Beth. She is hesitant, as her father had told her that the wrong kind of moonshine could make her go blind. Daryl tells her that there's "nothing worth seeing out there anyway." As she drinks, she tries to encourage Daryl to join her, but he refuses, desiring to stay sober to protect them. However, he eventually succumbs when Beth has him join in a game of "Never have I ever", during which Beth challenges Daryl in some painful ways. In his intoxication, he becomes upset and belligerent, revealing much about the hardship of growing up with his abusive father. He drags Beth out to where a walker is approaching and uses his crossbow to pin it to a tree; he then tries to teach Beth how to use the crossbow to kill it, but Beth insists on using her knife. The two begin to argue, Daryl calling Beth a "dumb college girl," while Beth accuses Daryl of not caring anymore. Daryl breaks down, believing himself responsible for Hershel's death, as he had failed to kill The Governor when he had a chance. Beth embraces Daryl as he cries.

After some time, a more sober Daryl tells Beth about the difficult times between himself and Merle as children. Beth gives him confidence that he will survive and that he needs to put his past behind him or it will kill him. Together they agree to burn down the house as a figurative way to move forward. They watch from a distance as the house goes up in flames, both laughing and flipping off the house before turning away and leaving.

== Production ==
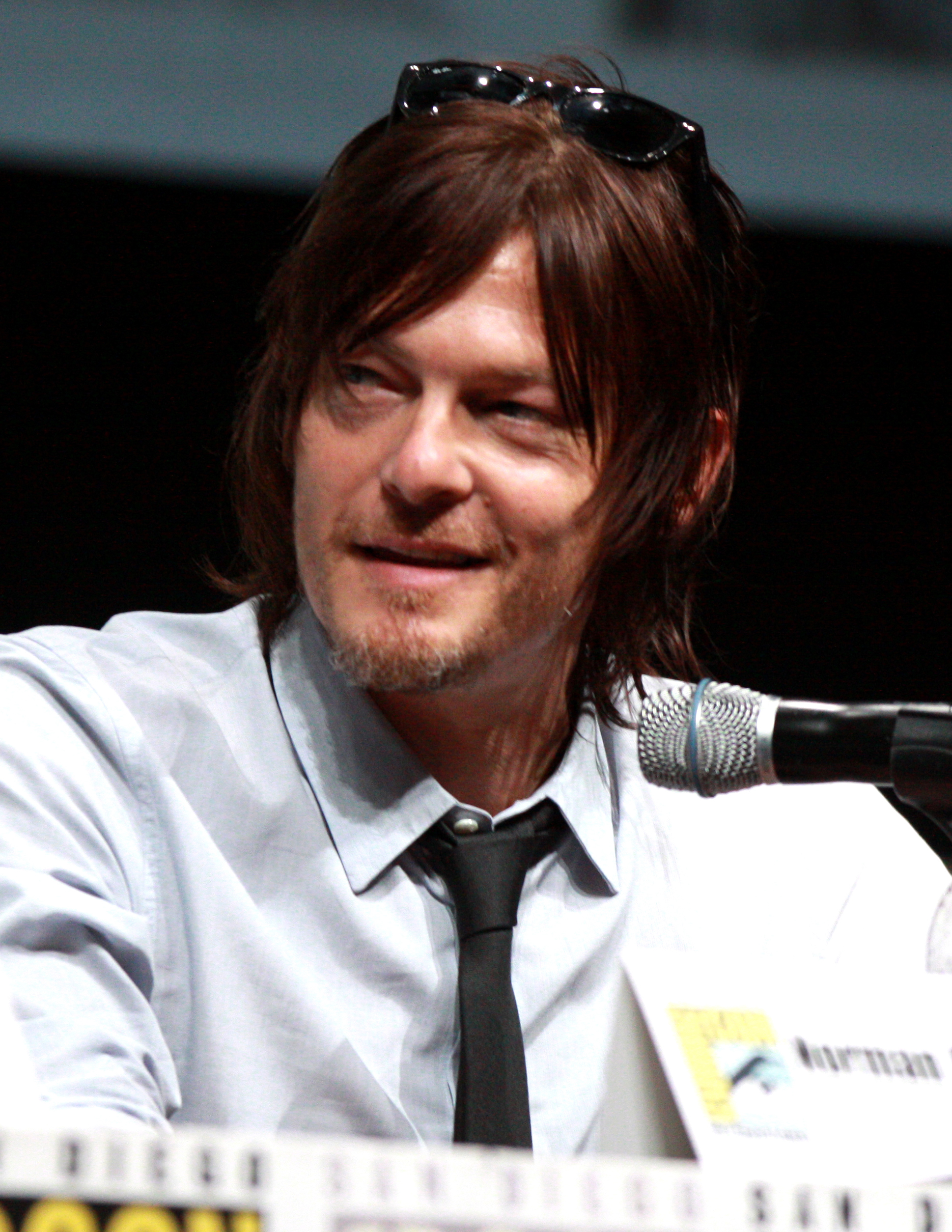
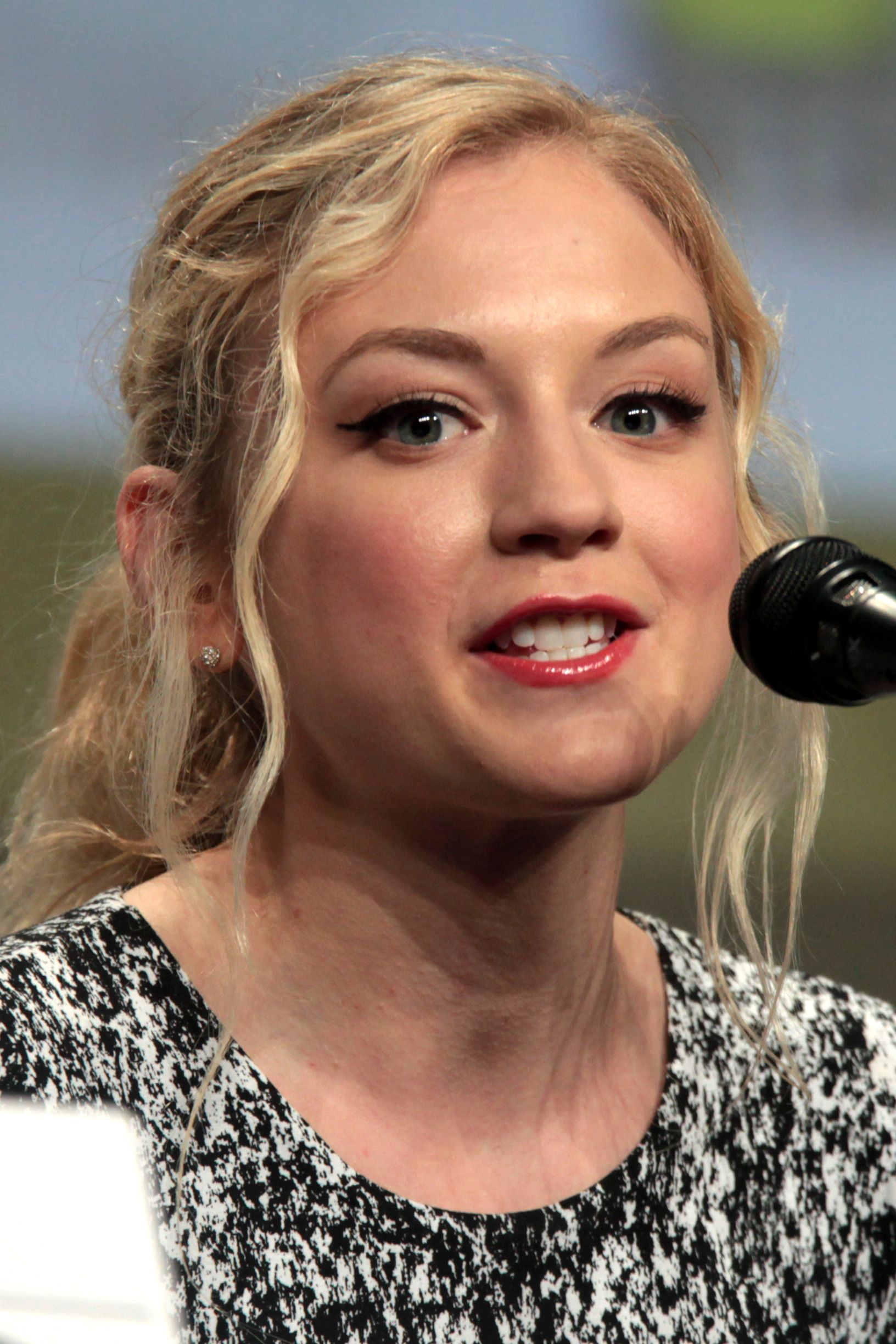
Reedus (left) and Kinney (right) were the only regular actors to appear in the episode.

"Still" was written by producer Angela Kang and directed by series editor Julius Ramsay, marking his directorial debut.

This episode focuses entirely on the characters of Daryl Dixon (Norman Reedus) and Beth Greene (Emily Kinney). This episode is the first to feature just two series regulars which both have no comic counterparts. Andrew Lincoln (Rick), Steven Yeun (Glenn), Lauren Cohan (Maggie), Danai Gurira (Michonne), Chandler Riggs (Carl), and Melissa McBride (Carol) are all credited but do not appear. Chad L. Coleman (Tyreese), Sonequa Martin-Green (Sasha) and Lawrence Gilliard Jr. (Bob) are also absent but are credited as "also starring".

== Reception ==
=== Viewership ===
Upon airing, the episode was watched by 12.61 million American viewers, receiving an 18-49 rating of 6.4. This presented a slight decrease in ratings from the previous episode, but still presented strong ratings against the 86th Academy Awards. The show placed first overall in cable television viewing.

=== Critical reception ===
Roth Cornet of IGN gave the episode a positive review, mainly praising the character development of Daryl and Beth, and gave the episode a score of 8.5 out of 10. She commented that the episode featured "some of the most grounded and engaging character moments of the season" and praised the horror elements, particularly the opening sequence, calling it "evocative" and "very satisfyingly, creepy."

Zack Handlen of The A.V. Club rated the episode a "B." He noted the episode's slower pace, with no advancement of plot, but enjoyed the character development. He positively commented on the opening sequence, as well as the concluding scene. Overall, he wrote, the episode "has its moments, but the lack of forward progress and the failure to turn authorly ambition into effective results keep it from being a success."
