= Escape the Field =

- Theatrical release poster
- Directed by: Emerson Moore
- Written by: Emerson Moore; Joshua Dobkin; Sean Wathen
- Produced by: Andrew Davies Gans; Michael Philip; Jason Moring; Emerson Moore
- Starring: Jordan Claire Robbins; Theo Rossi; Tahirah Sharif; Julian Feder; Elena Juatco; Shane West
- Cinematography: Stephen Whitehead
- Edited by: Mitchell Martin
- Music by: Will Musser
- Production company: Anacapa Pictures
- Distributed by: Lionsgate Films
- Release date: May 6, 2022
- Country: United States
- Language: English

Escape the Field is a 2022 American thriller film directed by Emerson Moore and starring Jordan Claire Robbins, Theo Rossi, and Shane West.

== Plot ==
Six kidnapped strangers wake up in an endless cornfield. Not knowing who abducted them, they must survive in a hostile environment by solving puzzles using their respective abilities and with provided objects including matches, a compass, a canteen, a single-bullet gun, a lantern, and a knife.

== Cast ==
- Jordan Claire Robbins as Sam
- Theo Rossi as Tyler
- Shane West as Ryan
- Elena Juatco as Denise
- Julian Feder as Ethan
- Tahirah Sharif as Cameron
- Emerson Moore as Business Man
- Jeff Kress as Creature

== Production ==
Crystal Reed was initially cast in the role played by Robbins.

Principal photography occurred in a Toronto cornfield in September 2020.

== Release ==
In February 2022, it was announced that Lionsgate acquired North American and UK distribution rights to the film, which was released in May 2022.

== Reception ==
The film has a 19% score on Rotten Tomatoes based on 27 reviews, with an average rating of 3.80/10. Nick Allen of RogerEbert.com awarded the film one star out of four.
