= A Beginner's Guide to Snuff =

- Directed by: Mitchell Altieri
- Written by: Cory Knauf; Adam Weis
- Starring: Joey Kern; Luke Edwards; Bree Williamson
- Distributed by: Indican Pictures
- Release date: March 4, 2016 (Cinequest Film Festival)
- Country: United States
- Language: English
- Box office: $21,031

A Beginner's Guide to Snuff is a 2016 horror comedy directed by Mitchell Altieri.

== Plot ==
Two brothers, Dresden and Dominic, are aspiring actors that enter a horror film contest and make a found footage horror film, a fake snuff film. The film starts where Dominic and Dresden take auditions for an actress without giving them much clue as to the project. Here they decide on Jennifer to be the most suitable actress for the role. Instead of informing her and hiring her, they decide to kidnap her and record all moments to capture genuine footage. Dresden believes this to be the best for his entry to the contest and that he is doing this for Cinema.

The brothers kidnap Jennifer and then record various torture on her while failing to scare her. She realises that her captors are not professionals and tries to escape. Things turn for the worse for the two brothers when they discover that Jennifer has freed herself and now has a gun on them. They shortly discover that she is a psychopath and a murderer who kills Kenneth Kennedy.

Jennifer now ties and records the emotions of the brothers in her scary games. Towards the end she kills them both and then the complete film is shown to be released on Christmas Eve as she promised to make them famous.

== Cast ==
- Joey Kern as Dresden Winters
- Luke Edwards as Dominic Winters
- Bree Williamson as Jennifer
- Brad Greenquist as Kenneth Kennedy
