= Julius Ramsay =

American director, editor, and producer

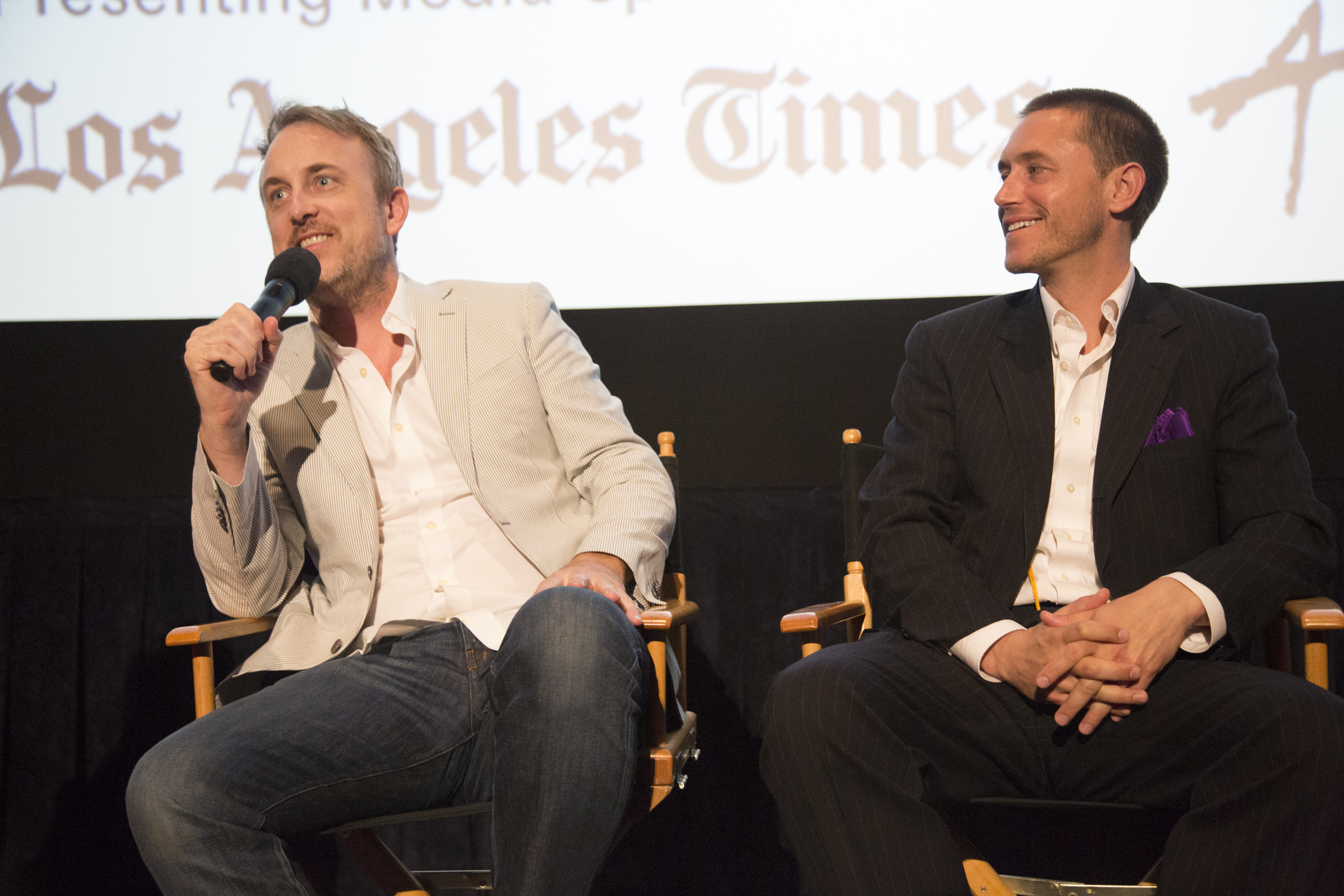
- Julius and Alston Ramsay
- Born: Asheboro, North Carolina
- Education: Dartmouth College
- Occupations: Director; Producer; Editor
- Years active: 2005–present

Julius Ramsay is an American film director, editor, and producer. He is known for directing two feature films and episodes of The Walking Dead, The Purge, and other television series. Ramsay has received multiple Emmy nominations. Ramsay's film debut Midnighters holds an 81% rating on Rotten Tomatoes. His second film, The Current Occupant, is a tech-noir horror film about the President of the United States. The film was produced by Blumhouse for the Into the Dark anthology series and released on Hulu in July 2020.

== Early life and education ==
Ramsay grew up in the small town of Asheboro North Carolina where his family worked in medical textiles. He began making short films at the age of 12 before attending Dartmouth College. During his sophomore year, he worked as a White House Intern in the Clinton Administration. He graduated with a B.A. in history with a focus on revolutionary movements in developing nations. He frequently works with his younger brother, writer/producer Alston Ramsay, who was a speechwriter and senior Pentagon communications official in the Bush and Obama administrations.

== Career ==
Ramsay started his career as an editor on documentary shows, such as VH1's Behind the Music and ESPN's SportsCentury and moved into reality television, like American Idol, The Bachelor and its spin-off The Bachelorette. In 2006, he began editing serials, such as Alias, Battlestar Galactica and FlashForward. From 2010 to 2015, he edited 23 episodes of The Walking Dead. His work as an editor has earned him three Emmy nominations, once for The Contender and twice for Battlestar Galactica ("He That Believeth in Me" and "Daybreak, Part 2").

Ramsay began his professional directing career by directing episodes of The Walking Dead. Ramsay directed episodes of other television series including The Purge, Scream, Outcast, and Krypton. In 2018, he directed and produced the feature film Midnighters, a noir thriller written by his brother Alston. Midnighters premiered at the Los Angeles Film Festival and was purchased for theatrical and digital distribution by IFC Films. It currently holds an 81% rating on Rotten Tomatoes.

Ramsay's second feature, The Current Occupant, is a psychedelic institutional horror film based on the Ramsay brothers' experiences working in politics. Actor Barry Watson stars as a patient in a mental asylum who believes that he is the President of the United States. The script was written by Alston Ramsay and produced by Blumhouse as a Hulu Original for Hulu. Julius and Alston worked as Executive Producers on the film. The Current Occupant is the Independence Day-themed installment of Hulu's anthology film series Into the Dark. Filming was completed two weeks before the COVID-19 pandemic suspended film production in the United States. Ramsay completed all of his post-production work on the film remotely and the release was delayed two weeks. A trailer was released on July 2, 2020 and the film premiered on Hulu on July 17, 2020, to favorable reviews.

On August 21, 2021, Amazon Studios announced that it was developing Infinite Thread, a television series created and written by Julius and Alston Ramsay. The series is a co-production between Amazon and Universal Television. It will be produced by the Ramsay brothers, Byron Balasco, and Justin Lin through his company Perfect Storm Entertainment. Deadline Hollywood describes Infinite Thread as a series that "blends true crime and science fiction in its depiction of one man’s epic investigation into a crime that breaks the boundaries of time and space."

== Filmography ==
Television

| Year | Title | Notes |
|---|---|---|
| 2014–2015 | The Walking Dead | Episodes "Still" and "Them" |
| 2015 | Scream | Episode "Betrayed" |
| 2016 | Outcast | Episode "A Wrath Unseen" |
| 2018 | The Purge | Episode "Rise Up" |
| 2018–2019 | Krypton | Episode "House of Zod", "Will to Power" and "Will to Power" |
| 2020 | Into the Dark | Episode "The Current Occupant" (Also executive producer) |

Film

- Midnighters (2017) (Also producer)
