= Alex Essoe =

Canadian actress

- Born: March 9, 1992 (age 34); Dhahran, Saudi Arabia
- Occupation: Actress
- Years active: 2008–present

Alexandra Essoe (born March 9, 1992) is a Canadian actress who has appeared predominantly in horror films. Essoe had her first lead role in the 2014 American horror film Starry Eyes, and she had a starring role in the 2017 American horror film Midnighters. She has collaborated several times with director Mike Flanagan, playing Wendy Torrance in the 2019 horror film Doctor Sleep and playing supporting roles in the series The Haunting of Bly Manor in 2020 and Midnight Mass in 2021.

== Career ==
Essoe's parents were Canadian and American immigrants living in Saudi Arabia when Essoe was born. When she was 12 years old, she and her family moved to Toronto. Essoe's mother was a stage actor, and Essoe watched rehearsals and productions. While she acted in high school, including playing the lead in Medea, she initially aspired to be a teacher. After a couple of years modeling, she took an acting workshop in Toronto, which led her to an acting school in Vancouver, and later, a school in Los Angeles. Prior to starring in Starry Eyes, she appeared in the TV series Reaper and various short films.

== Filmography ==
Film and television roles
Year	Title	Role	Notes
2008	Reaper	Young Bride	Episode: "The Leak"
2009	Crash	Alyssa	Episode: "No Matter What You Do"
2010	Passion Play	Audrey	
2011	Ecstasy	Helena	
2011	Boy Toy	Sofia	Direct-to-video film
2012	Dancing with Shadows	Amber	
2013	House of Lies	Model #1	Episode: "Damonschildren.org"
2014	Starry Eyes	Sarah	
2015	Tales of Halloween	Lynn	Segment: "Grim Grinning Ghost"
2015	Don't Wake Mommy	Susan	Television film; also known as Dark Intentions
2016	The Neighbor	Rosie	
2016	Fashionista	April	
2017	Midnighters	Lindsey	
2017	Polaris	Nurse Iris	also known as The Blessed Ones
2017	The Super	Ms. Daigle	
2017	Sisters	Lisa Young	
2018	The Maestro	Cyd Charisse	
2018	Red Island	Amy	
2019	The Drone	Rachel	
2019	Homewrecker	Michelle	Also writer and producer
2019	States	Grace Genet	
2019	Doctor Sleep	Wendy Torrance	
2020	Death of Me	Samantha	
2020	The Haunting of Bly Manor	Charlotte Wingrave	
2021	Midnight Mass	Mildred Gunning	
2022	The Midnight Club	Poppy Corn	Episode: "Road to Nowhere"
2023	Trim Season	Julia	
2023	The Pope's Exorcist	Julia Vasquez	
2023	The Fall of the House of Usher	Court Witness	Episode: "The Masque of Red Death"
2023	The Last Stop in Yuma County	Sarah	
2024	The Carnal Soul	Nurse	Short film
2024	Fall Risk	Dr. Benner	Short film
2025	Pitfall	Ashley	
TBA	Persephone: Pictures at the End of the World	Harper	
