= Bree Williamson =

Canadian actress

- Born: December 28, 1979 (age 46); Toronto, Ontario, Canada
- Other name: Bree Roberts
- Occupation: Actress
- Years active: 1999–present
- Spouses: Josh Evans (m. 2005; div. 2007) Michael Roberts (m. 2008; died 2026)
- Children: 1

Bree Williamson Roberts (born December 28, 1979) is a Canadian actress.

== Career ==
After graduating from Bayview Glen School, she completed her education at the University of Toronto. She played the role of Jessica Buchanan on the ABC soap opera One Life to Live from February 5, 2003 until the series cancelation in 2012. The character is the daughter of original character Viki Lord Buchanan (played by Daytime Emmy Award-winner Erika Slezak since 1971), and gave Williamson the opportunity to portray Jessica's alternate personalities "Tess", from 2005 to 2006 and again starting in 2008 and 2011.

Williamson had previously auditioned for the role of Jen Rappaport on One Life to Live, but was rejected because of her resemblance to actress Erin Torpey (the two looked nearly identical), who was playing Jessica Buchanan on the show at the time. When Torpey resigned in January 2003, Williamson was remembered by the casting department and offered the role of Jessica. She so closely resembled Torpey that many viewers did not notice the change.

In 2009, 2010 and 2011 Williamson was nominated for a Daytime Emmy Award for Outstanding Supporting Actress for the role of Jessica. In 2009, Williamson appeared as Brandeis on Gossip Girl in the episode "The Grandfather: Part II"; she reprised the role in the 2010 episode "The Empire Strikes Jack". In 2012, Williamson joined the cast of Haven as Dr. Claire Callahan for Season 3, which began airing in September 2012. In 2013, Williamson appeared in flashbacks as Vivian Bowers, the murder victim in the NBC TV series Deception.

In 2015, Williamson appeared as April Littleton, a photographer going back to her hometown, in Portrait of Love, which premiered on Hallmark Channel on March 7. On May 26, 2016, it was announced that Williamson would originate the role of Claudette Beaulieu on July 5, 2016, on General Hospital.

== Personal life ==
On December 29, 2005 Williamson married Josh Evans. In the July 3, 2007 edition of Soap Opera Digest, she announced that she and Evans had separated in June 2007; they later divorced. In the September 2006 issue of ABC Soaps in Depth, Williamson revealed she had just received her green card and proudly proclaimed, "Now you can't kick me out!"

In 2006 Williamson was a co-host for the Planned Parenthood Awards, which honor individuals and organizations for "their contributions to protecting women's rights." She also appeared in a public service announcement for breast cancer awareness.

In 2008, Williamson married Michael John Roberts. On September 21, 2010, Williamson and Roberts welcomed their first child, McGreggor Edward Roberts. Roberts died in November 2026 of glioblastoma.

== Filmography ==
Film and television roles
Year	Title	Role	Notes
1999	Twice in a Lifetime	Carol Anne	Episode: "School's Out"
2001	Doc	—N/a	Episode: "You Gotta Have Heart"
2001	Earth: Final Conflict	Victim	Episode: "Termination"
2002	Odyssey 5	Kid #2	Episode: "Kitten"
2002	Mutant X	Miranda Davis	Episode: "Crossroads of the Soul"
2002	National Lampoon's Adam & Eve	Andrea	Film
2003–12	One Life to Live	Jessica Buchanan	Regular role (667 episodes)
2009–10	Gossip Girl	Brandeis	Episodes: "The Grandfather: Part II", "The Empire Strikes Jack"
2010	Law & Order: Criminal Intent	Amber Donelli	Episode: "Gods & Insects"
2012–13	Haven	Claire Callahan and Arla Cogan	11 episodes
2013	Deception	Vivian Bowers	Recurring role (6 episodes)
2013	CSI: Crime Scene Investigation	Becca Sabin	Episode: "Dead of the Class"
2013	Sins of the Preacher	Debbie Martin	Television movie
2014	True Detective	Jennifer	Episode: "The Locked Room"
2014	Hell's Kitchen	Herself	Guest diner; Season 12 Episode 18: "5 Chefs Compete"
2015	A Mother Betrayed	Lisa	Television movie
2015	Chicago Fire	Beth Pridgen	Episodes: "Call It Paradise," "Headlong Toward Disaster"
2015	Portrait of Love	April Littleton	Television movie (Hallmark Channel)
2016–17	General Hospital	Claudette Beaulieu	Recurring role
2016	A Beginner's Guide to Snuff	Jennifer	Film
2016	Castle	Karla	Season 8 Episode 18: "Backstabber"
2017	Mommy's Little Boy	Briana Wilson	Television movie
2017	The Wrong Nanny	Meredith	Television movie
2017	Private Eyes	Melanie Parker	Recurring role
2018	Intensive Care	Monica Roberts	Television movie
2018	Deadly Patient	Dr. Hillary Spenser	
2020	Mommy Is A Murderer	Karina	

== Awards and nominations ==
List of acting awards and nominations
Year	Award	Category	Title	Result	Ref.
2009	Daytime Emmy Award	Outstanding Supporting Actress in a Drama Series	One Life to Live	Nominated	
2010	Daytime Emmy Award	Outstanding Supporting Actress in a Drama Series	One Life to Live	Nominated	
2011	Daytime Emmy Award	Outstanding Supporting Actress in a Drama Series	One Life to Live	Nominated	
2016	Fear Awards	Best Actress (Jury Prize)	A Beginner's Guide to Snuff	Won	
