= Midnighters =

Midnighters may refer to:

- The Midnighters, a rhythm and blues group from the 1950s, led by Hank Ballard
- Thee Midniters, a Chicano rock group from the 1960s
- The Midnighters trilogy, a novel series written by Scott Westerfeld
- Midnighters, a fictional intelligence organization from Scott Lynch's Gentleman Bastard novel series
- Midnighters (film), a 2017 American thriller film
- Midnighter, a comic book superhero
  - Midnighter (2006 comic book), published by Wildstorm
  - Midnighter (2015 comic book), published by DC Comics
