= Richard Harmon =

Canadian actor (born 1991)

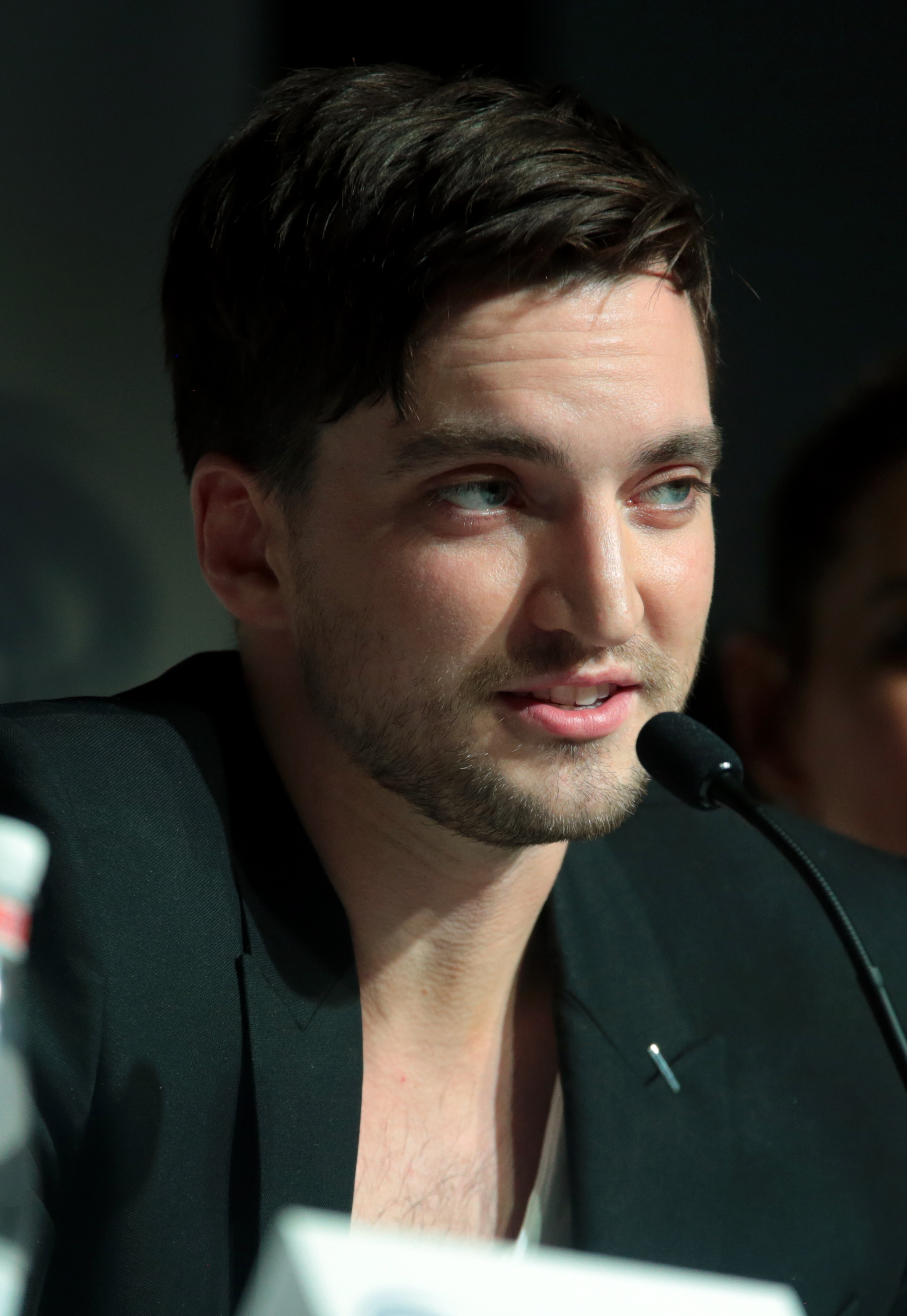
- Harmon in 2018
- Born: Richard Scott Harmon; August 18, 1991 (age 35); Mississauga, Ontario, Canada
- Occupation: Actor
- Years active: 2003–present
- Relatives: Jessica Harmon (sister)

Richard Scott Harmon (born August 18, 1991) is a Canadian actor. His roles on television include Jasper Ames in The Killing (2011–2012), Julian Randol on Continuum (2012–2015), John Murphy in The 100 (2014–2020), and Joe on Memory of a Killer (2026). Harmon received critical praise for his role in the 2013 film If I Had Wings and had a supporting role as Erik Campbell in the horror film Final Destination Bloodlines (2025).

== Early life ==
Richard Harmon was born in Mississauga, Ontario, Canada. His parents are director Allan Harmon and producer Cynde Harmon; his sister is actress Jessica Harmon.

== Career ==
Harmon made his acting debut in the 2002 television series Jeremiah.

In March 2024, Harmon was cast as Erik Campbell in Final Destination Bloodlines, the sixth installment in the Final Destination franchise. A lifelong fan of the franchise, Harmon did not receive an update on his audition for eight months due to the 2023 SAG-AFTRA strike. Harmon described Erik as "a bit of a dick" but recognized the immense love the character has for his family. During filming, Harmon often improvised his lines and filmed his own stunts. Following Bloodlines' release in May 2025, Harmon received positive reviews for his performance, with /Film's BJ Colangelo and Jacob Oller of The A.V. Club describing him as a scene stealer. Todd Gilchrist, writing for Variety, praised Harmon's performance as "surprisingly thoughtful", while Beatrice Loayza of The New York Times described him as a "comic standout".

== Filmography ==
=== Film ===
Key
†	Denotes films that have not yet been released

Year	Title	Role	Notes	Ref.
2007	Trick 'r Treat	Vampire kid		
2010	Percy Jackson & the Olympians: The Lightning Thief	Smart kid		
2010	Triple Dog	Stefan		
2011	Judas Kiss	Danny Reyes Jr.		
2012	Girl in Progress	Bad boy		
2012	Rufus	Clay		
2012	Grave Encounters 2	Alex Wright		
2013	Evangeline	Michael Konnor		
2013	If I Had Wings	Alex Taylor		
2014	Cruel and Unusual	William		
2015	The Age of Adaline	Tony		
2018	I Still See You	Kirk Lane		
2019	Crypto	Jake		
2020	Darkness Falls	Adam Witver		
2020	The Return	Roger		
2020	Woodland	Jake		
2021	A Cinderella Story: Starstruck	Kale		
2022	Margaux	Clay		
2024	Lowlifes	Vern		
2025	Final Destination Bloodlines	Erik Campbell		
2025	Pitfall	Lars		
2026	One Mile: Chapter One	Ray Dixon		
2027	Karoshi †	Markus Lam	Post-production	
TBA	Fu †	Jeremy		

=== Television ===
Year	Title	Role	Notes
2003	Jeremiah	Madison	Episode: "The Mysterious Mister Smith"
2005	School of Life	Timmy	Television film
2005	Painkiller Jane	Squeak	Television film
2006	Medium	Stephen Cambell	Episode: "The Boy Next Door"
2006	Da Vinci's City Hall	Andrew	2 episodes
2007	Flash Gordon	Tee-Jay's friend	Episode: "Ascension"
2007	Aliens in America	Junior #2	Episode: "Junior Prank"
2007	To Be Fat Like Me	Kyle	Television film
2008	Left Coast		Television film
2009	Smallville	Gaunt teenage addict	Episode: "Turbulence"
2009	Wolf Canyon	Intern	Television film
2010	Caprica	Tad/Heracles	2 episodes
2010	Riese: Kingdom Falling	Prototype	7 episodes
2010	Fringe	Teenager	Episode: "White Tulip"
2010	Shattered	Trevor Stanwood	Episode: "Sound of a Strap"
2010	Dear Mr. Gacy	Victim	
2010	Tower Prep	Ray Snider	Recurring role
2010	The Cult	Lucas	Television film
2011	Clue	Andrew	Episode: "School for Conspiracy"
2011	The Haunting Hour: The Series	Bobby/Caleb	2 episodes Won – Leo Award for Best Performance in a Youth or Children's Program or Series (2011)
2011	Time After Time	Ricky	Television film
2011–2012	The Killing	Jasper Ames	Recurring role (seasons 1–2)
2012	The Secret Circle	Ian	2 episodes
2012	The Pregnancy Project	Aaron	Television film
2012	The Wishing Tree	Andrew Breen	Television film
2012–2015	Continuum	Julian Randol	Recurring role Won – Leo Award for Best Supporting Performance by a Male in a Dramatic Series (2013)
2013	Rogue	Lee	2 episodes
2013	One Foot in Hell	Cory	Television film
2013	Forever 16	Jared	Television film
2013	Scarecrows	Tyler	Television film
2013–2014	Bates Motel	Richard Sylmore	4 episodes
2014	Intruders	Bix	Episode: "There Is No End"
2014	Christmas Icetastrophe	Tim Ratchet	Television film
2014–2020	The 100	John Murphy	Recurring role (seasons 1–2); main role (seasons 3–7); Won – Leo Award for Best Supporting Performance by a Male in a Dramatic Series (2014); Nominated – Leo Award for Best Guest Performance by a Male in a Dramatic Series (2015); Nominated – UBCP/ACTRA Award for Best Actor (2017); Nominated – Leo Award for Best Supporting Performance by a Male in a Dramatic Series (2018); Nominated – Leo Award for Best Supporting Performance by a Male in a Dramatic Series (2020)
2015	CSI: Crime Scene Investigation	Kyle Jessup	Episode: "Merchants of Menace"
2015	Garage Sale Mystery	William Carson	Episode: "The Deadly Room"
2015	A Mother's Instinct	Seth Durand	Television film Nominated – Leo Award for Best Lead Performance By A Male in a Television Movie (2016)
2015	The Hollow		Television film
2019	Van Helsing	Max Borman	Recurring role (season 4); Won – Leo Award for Best Guest Performance by a Male in a Dramatic Series (2020); Nominated – UBCP/ACTRA Award for Best Supporting Performance, Male (2020)
2021	Kung Fu	TJ	Episode: "Destiny"
2022	Fakes	Tryst	Main role
2022	Game, Set, Love	Will	Television film
2023	The Flash	Owen Mercer / Captain Boomerang	Recurring role (season 9)
2023	The Night Agent	Elliot Rome	Recurring role
2023	The Good Doctor	Eddie Richter	Episode: "Blessed"
2024	Tracker	Matt Winslow	Episode: "Springland"
2025	Alert: Missing Persons Unit	Jeffrey Evans	Episode: "April"
2025	Law & Order Toronto: Criminal Intent	Curtis Gibbons	Episode: "Disposable People"
2026	Memory of a Killer	Joe	Main role
