= Erik Campbell (Final Destination) =

- Final Destination character
- Richard Harmon as Erik Campbell
- First appearance: Final Destination Bloodlines (2025)
- Created by: Guy Busick; Lori Evans Taylor; Jon Watts
- Portrayed by: Richard Harmon

In-universe information
- Occupation: Tattoo artist
- Family: Iris Campbell (legal grandmother); Paul Campbell (legal grandfather); Jerry Fenbury (biological father); Howard Campbell (legal father); Brenda Campbell (mother); Julia Campbell (half-sister); Bobby Campbell (half-brother); Stefani Reyes (cousin); Charlie Reyes (cousin); Darlene Campbell (aunt); Marty Reyes (uncle)
- Home: Cloverdale, New York
- Status: Deceased
- Cause of death: Impaled and crushed inside an MRI machine by a wheelchair

Erik Campbell is a character from Final Destination Bloodlines (2025), the sixth installment in the Final Destination supernatural horror film franchise, directed by Zach Lipovsky and Adam Stein. He was created by Guy Busick, Lori Evans Taylor, and Jon Watts, and was portrayed by Richard Harmon. Erik is introduced as the son of Howard and Brenda Campbell, being the oldest of their three children. In the 1960s, his paternal grandmother Iris had a vision of a restaurant tower collapsing and prevented the disaster, saving herself and hundreds of others. As Erik and his family were not supposed to exist, Death itself targets Iris' bloodlines, killing them in order of lineage. When his younger sister is killed, seemingly out of order, Erik learns he is not a biological descendant of Iris, being the result of his mother's affair with another man. While attempting to help his brother Bobby nullify Death's list, Erik dies when he gets sucked into a malfunctioning magnetic resonance imaging (MRI) machine by a wheelchair that crushes and impales him.

In developing the cast of Bloodlines, Lipovsky stated that he and Stein wished to avoid creating one-dimensional characters, instead wanting to feature ones with layers to them. The reveal about Erik's parentage came from the crew wanting to subvert audience expectations regarding the order of the characters' deaths; one discarded concept involved twins whose birth order was uncertain. Initially, Erik was envisioned as an online streamer who died while livestreaming a virtual reality game. A longtime fan of the franchise, Harmon was cast as Erik eight months after his first audition, with a delay due to the 2023 SAG-AFTRA strike. Harmon helped influence many of his character's scenes and dialogue by either improvising his lines and actions or making suggestions to the production crew. From the beginning, Lipovsky and Stein hoped to feature a death scene involving an MRI machine, but were unsure where to place such a sequence in the film; they also questioned its ethical implications. In the end, they included the concept as it received a positive response from the production team.

Following the release of Bloodlines, Erik became a fan favorite. Critics often singled out Harmon's performance as among the best in the film, recognizing him as a "scene stealer" and praising him for adding comic relief. Erik's fake-out death scene at his tattoo parlor and his actual death involving an MRI machine were also commended by critics, with the latter deemed the best death scene in Bloodlines. Erik's death was further analyzed for its accuracy by scientific experts.

== Role ==
Erik is introduced as the son of Howard and Brenda Campbell, and the older brother of Julia and Bobby. His aunt is Darlene, whose children are his cousins Stefani and Charlie Reyes. All of them are descendants of Iris Campbell, Erik's paternal grandmother. In the late 1960s, she prevented the collapse of the Sky View tower after she foresaw it in a vision, saving hundreds in the process. Because the survivors were supposed to die in the disaster, Death itself came for them and their descendants, who would have not been begotten had Iris not intervened; siblings were killed in the order that they were born.

Erik and his family attend Iris's funeral after she let herself die in front of Stefani, who was being told by Iris that Death is after their bloodline. During a barbecue later that day, a chain reaction causes a lawnmower to shred Howard's head. Erik is warned by Stefani that he is the next Campbell to die, but he ignores her and goes to work at his tattoo parlor. While closing the parlor, cleaning fluid spills on the floor and causes a fire. Erik falls onto the blaze but is protected by his leather jacket.

The following day, Erik runs into Stefani and Charlie, who insist he is still next. When they fail to save Julia from being crushed by a garbage truck's compactor, they question why Death skipped Erik and instead pursued Julia. Brenda reveals Erik is not Howard's biological son; having had marital problems in the past, she had an affair with a neighbor named Jerry Fenbury, and Howard chose to raise Erik as his own. Stefani and the others realize that because Erik is not Iris' descendant, he was not targeted by Death.

With Bobby next, Erik, Stefani, Charlie, and Darlene take him to a hospital where they hope to get answers from "JB", a friend of Iris. There, they learn "JB" is William Bludworth, a forensic pathologist who has helped people try to cheat Death before. He informs them that the only way to escape Death is to have one's heart stop beating and then be resuscitated like in Kimberly Corman's case. However, he warns that interfering in Death's design can have dire consequences.

Following Bludworth's advice, Erik takes Bobby into a room with a magnetic resonance imaging (MRI) machine. He feeds Bobby a snack containing nuts, to which he is allergic, so that his heart can stop and doctors can revive him. Due to his attempted intervention to save Bobby, Death targets Erik as a result. Unbeknownst to them, the MRI machine gets turned on and rips Erik's piercings. The magnet's pull causes a wheelchair behind Erik to push him inside, which fatally impales and crushes him.

== Development ==
=== Background, creation, and casting ===
The horror franchise Final Destination began in 2000, with each film following a character who saves themselves and a few others from a mass-casualty disaster due to experiencing a vision, only for Death itself to kill them in elaborate accidents it stages. Final Destination Bloodlines (2025) is the sixth installment in the franchise and was directed by Zach Lipovsky and Adam Stein and written by Guy Busick and Lori Evans Taylor, based on a story by Busick, Taylor, and Jon Watts. According to Lipovsky, the intent with Bloodlines was to modify the formula and ensure that "even if [someone's] a massive fan of the franchise, [they] didn't know where things were going".

Erik Campbell, one of the main characters in Bloodlines, was central to the filmmakers' goal of subverting the audience's expectations, with Busick asserting that Erik's near-death experience in the tattoo parlor was always meant to be a fake-out. Concerning Erik's initial survival and parentage, producer Craig Perry stated that because Bloodlines follows a family and establishes the order of the characters' deaths early on, the crew considered various ideas to play around with the audience's assumptions. One initial idea was for two members of the Campbell family to be twins, with the characters being unsure which twin was born first until they both died. However, Perry viewed the concept as tonally "problematic" and it was discarded. Once the concept involving twins was abandoned, it was decided to have one of the characters be revealed as biologically unrelated to the rest of the Campbell family. Following the film's release, Stein clarified that during an early draft of Bloodlines, Erik was a live streamer and died while playing a virtual reality game during one of his live streams.

Richard Harmon found out about Bloodlines' production through his agent, who informed him via email that they had set up an audition for him. A longtime fan of the Final Destination franchise since seeing Final Destination 2 (2003) at a sleepover with his friends from elementary school, Harmon said in an interview with IndieWire that he felt like he had to be part of the film, auditioning for the roles of Erik and Paul, the character's grandfather. Due to the 2023 SAG-AFTRA strike, Harmon did not receive an update concerning his audition for eight months. After production resumed, Harmon was asked to audition for the role of Erik again, and the following day had an online meeting with Bloodlines' directors Lipovsky and Stein. A week after the meeting, Harmon was informed by his agent that he had obtained the role, which he described as one of the best experiences of his life. Harmon's involvement was officially announced along with the rest of the film's cast in March 2024.

=== Characterization ===
Erik was described as "a bit of a dick" by critics following the film's release, as noted by Harmon, who had fought to make his character more likeable. While recognizing that audiences would make negative assumptions about Erik based on his "alt-looking emo, punk-rock" appearance, Harmon believed that such perceptions were inaccurate, arguing that Erik is a misunderstood figure. Concerning Erik's layered personality, Lipovsky acknowledged that prior films in the franchise often featured flat characters, which ensured audiences enjoyed seeing them die; for Bloodlines, he and Stein wanted to use a similar starting point in having the characters seem stereotypical, but then reveal the cast as more layered than audiences expected.

Harmon realized his character was not as stereotypical as initially presented when he read the script and saw that Erik had a picture of himself with Howard as his phone lock screen; this helped him understand Erik's love for his family is his "driving force". According to Harmon's assessment, Erik's concern for his family is best displayed when he tells Stefani to stop confronting their family about Death's plan, as it is upsetting his mother, and when he decides to go to the hospital and help Bobby cheat Death, despite the reveal over his parentage. Busick similarly recognized Erik's love for his family and argued that his main flaw was that he "cared too much". However, Busick also described Erik as "kinda stupid", noting that his plan to help Bobby escape Death's list was not well-thought out, and argued that his "hubris" is what led to him being targeted by Death.

=== Filming ===
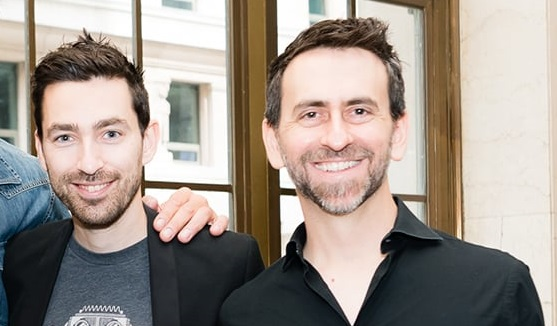
Directors Zach Lipovsky (left) and Adam Stein (right) asked Richard Harmon to improvise some of his lines, with Stein describing him as an "incredible improviser".

Because Stein and Lipovsky allowed the film's cast members to rehearse and improvise various scenes before shooting started, to help build chemistry between them, Erik underwent the most changes from the script to the finished movie out of all the characters. Stein and Lipovsky have both recognized that Harmon is well-known for his improvisational skills. Lipovsky noted that while many actors try to bring comedy into a role when asked to do improv, Harmon does it "from a character space and level" while managing to be "very dramatic but also incredibly hilarious".

For the scene where Erik discovers that Howard is not his biological father, but rather Jerry Fenbury, the directors asked Harmon to improvise his character's reaction. Harmon ad-libbed various reactions, using a different one for each take. One of his reactions ("Oh, God, is that why he always calls me Buckaroo?") could not be used because it caused his fellow castmates to break character and start laughing. Harmon clarified that the reaction of the characters to Erik's parentage was meant to indicate that Jerry is "a fucking loser". For one take, he decided to go against script directions and used the line "Fuck, mom. Fenbury got you too?!" instead.

The scene at the tattoo parlor involves Erik's nose piercing getting hooked to a chain. This took five days to shoot and occurred during the second week of filming. According to Harmon, the scene did not contain any computer-generated graphics, consisting only of practical effects, including the fire ignited by chemical fluid on the parlor's floor. To film the scene, Harmon had wires attached behind him to hold him in place. Although the chain that gets tangled in Erik's nose piercing was real, it had a "breakaway weight" to ensure Harmon's safety; if the wires holding him up were to break, so would the chain. Harmon performed his own stunts for the scene, with the exception of Erik falling off the chair and into the flames below him. Despite the difficulty of the stunts, he enjoyed filming the scene, describing it as one of his favorites in the film.

=== MRI machine death ===
According to Lipovsky, having a death scene involving an MRI machine is something the crew conceived early during Bloodlines' production; however, there was uncertainty over where in the film it should be placed. Lipovsky and the crew also "debated the ethics" of featuring such a scene in the film, recognizing that previous installments had impacted viewers and consumers regarding particular objects or activities. Despite these questions, Lipovsky and Stein decided in favor of including the MRI death scene in the film as it was "kind of everyone's favorite scene".

To prepare for the scene, Busick and Evans Taylor did research on accidents involving MRI machines. According to Stein, the crew discovered that while most accidents did not involve human injuries, there were several instances of objects such as "oxygen tanks or gurneys get[ting] sucked towards MRIs". According to Lipovsky, recognizing the need to "push reality beyond the scientific level [to] make a horror scene out of" an MRI machine, they intentionally chose to set Erik's death in a hospital that also functions as a research center; this helped justify the MRI machine in the movie reaching a magnetic level high enough to kill Erik and Bobby.

The MRI scene was the third one Harmon filmed with Owen Patrick Joyner (Bobby), during the first week of shooting. Harmon explained that while it was intended for the scene to include some comedy, it was also "important emotionally" to show that although Erik felt confident about his plan to kill and revive Bobby, he was still scared and unsure if it would actually work. Harmon believed that his chemistry with Joyner helped convey the familial love between their characters.

Erik having a penile piercing was Harmon's idea, arguing it made sense for the character to have one given "the way that he's tattooed and [...] pierced". Stein and Lipovsky had earlier considered the idea and decided to implement it at Harmon's suggestion. For Erik's death where the wheelchair begins to impale him, a torso duplicate of Harmon was created that was folded in reverse and had "breakaway tattooed skins and an elaborate rig to tear it apart". To film Erik's spine getting bent backwards in the machine, Harmon laid on a board with a stuntman underneath it; as the board and Harmon were pulled inside the machine, the stuntman's legs were sticking out of it.

== Reception ==
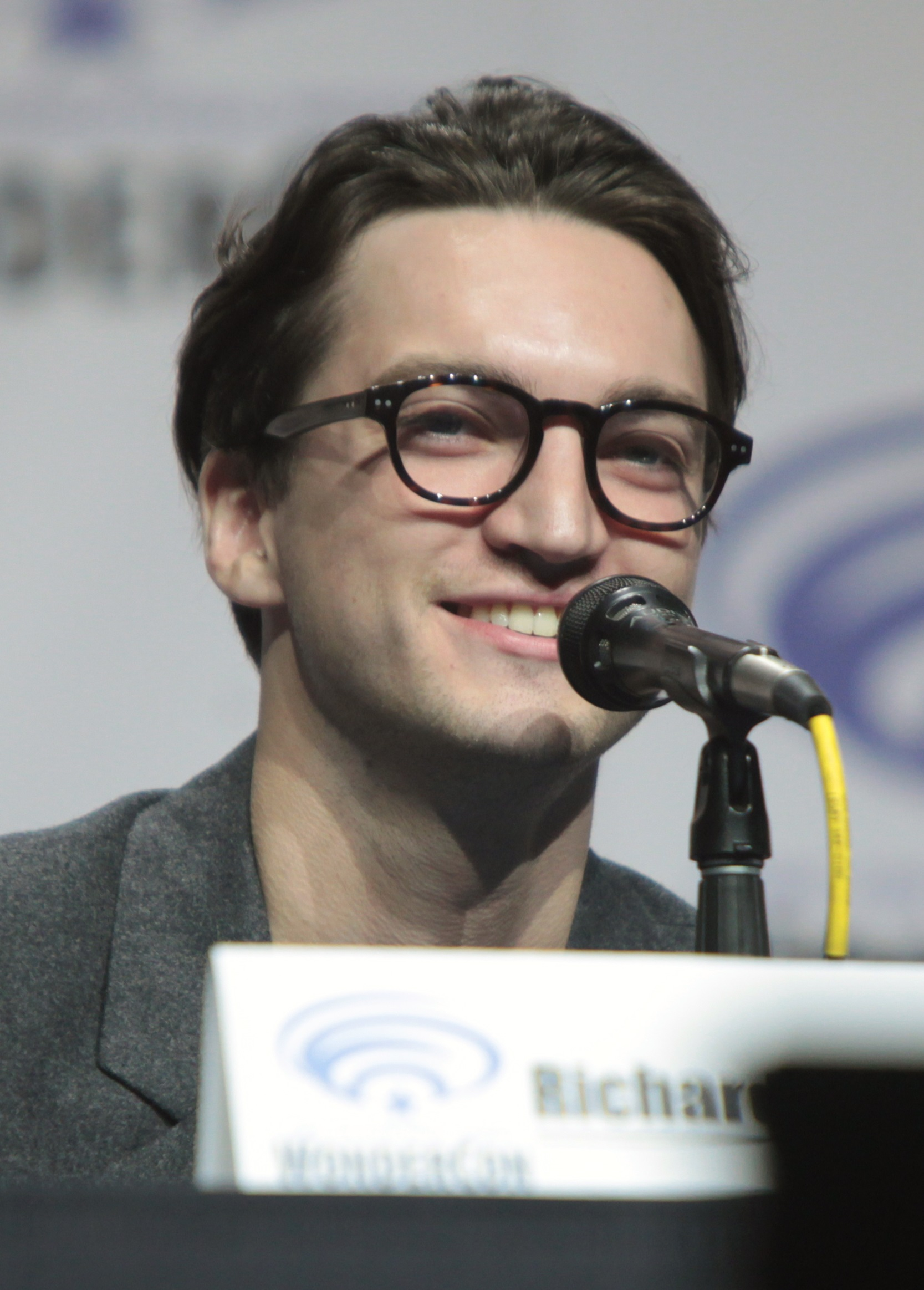
Richard Harmon (pictured 2016) received praise for his performance as Erik.

Erik received a positive response from both fans and critics. John Squires of Bloody Disgusting, IndieWire's Alison Foreman, and ComicBook.com writer Charlie Ridgely have referred to Erik as a fan favorite, with Ridgely additionally describing him as the film's breakout character. Also writing for ComicBook.com, Spencer Perry opined that Erik was the most interesting character in the film. Rafael Motamayor of /Film praised Bloodlines's focus on family for providing an "emotional undertone", highlighting Erik's attempt to save Bobby, despite the reveal Erik himself was not targeted by Death. Foreman also described Erik as a tragic figure in that he dies trying to help his family.

Harmon's performance was commended by critics. Perry and Jonathan Sim of ComingSoon.net both highlighted him as one of the best actors in the film. Todd Gilchrist, writing for Variety, praised Harmon's performance as "surprisingly thoughtful", with The Guardian's Radheyan Simonpillai, who commended the entire cast, also singling out Harmon's portrayal of Erik. Harmon was also described as a "scene stealer" by Ridgely, /Film's BJ Colangelo, and Jacob Oller of The A.V. Club, with Foreman describing him as "magnetic". Beatrice Loayza of The New York Times and The Hollywood Reporter writer Frank Scheck took notice of Harmon's comedic talent in the film.

Several critics highlighted Erik's near-death scene in the tattoo parlor. Katie Walsh of The Seattle Times praised the scene for its execution, with NME's Jordan Bassett describing it as a "fabulously nasty set-piece". Jesse Hassenger of Paste also recognized the scene for being humorous. Vulture writer Bilge Ebiri describes Erik's fake-out death scene as "hugely elaborate", also viewing his survival as surprising. Relating to this, Jamie Graham of Empire commended the reveal that Erik is not a descendant of Iris, and thus safe from Death, for effectively subverting audience expectations.

Erik's eventual death scene involving an MRI machine was praised. Scheck viewed Erik's death as the best one in Bloodlines. Foreman deemed it the best in the franchise, describing the scene as making her emotional and recognizing it for "intertwining humor, horror, and heart". Joe George of Den of Geek similarly described Erik's death — alongside Bobby's — as the sixth-best death scene in the franchise. George also viewed Erik and Bobby's love for each other as making their deaths "poignant". Relating to this, Oller praised Harmon's chemistry with Joyner, believing that they play well off each other.

His death was also analyzed by experts for its scientific accuracy. Ben Inglis, physicist and manager at the University of California Berkeley Brain Imaging Center, and Max Wintermark, chair of the Department of Neuroradiology at the University of Texas' MD Anderson Cancer Center, recognized that most MRI machines are incapable of increasing in magnetic power; whenever there is a change in the strength of an MRI machine's magnetic field, its magnetic pull will become weaker, rather than stronger. However, Inglis did acknowledge that the magnets within MRI machines are strong enough to pull various types of metallic objects into them; The Today Show writer Sarah Jacoby highlighted different instances of metallic objects — like oxygen tanks and wheelchairs — getting sucked into such machines, with some incidents leading to patients getting injured.
