= Alston Ramsay =

American journalist and screenwriter

- Born: Asheboro, North Carolina
- Education: Dartmouth College
- Occupations: Screenwriter, Film Producer, Journalist, Speechwriter
- Years active: 2006–present

Alston Ramsay is an American journalist, speechwriter, screenwriter, and film producer. He is known for his work as a Pentagon speechwriter in the Bush and Obama administrations and as a screenwriter for critically acclaimed feature films. Ramsay spent a year in Kabul, Afghanistan, on General David Petraeus’ senior staff. He wrote and produced the IFC film Midnighters which holds an 81% rating on Rotten Tomatoes. His second film, The Current Occupant, is a tech-noir horror film about the President of the United States. The film was produced by Blumhouse for the Into the Dark anthology series and released on Hulu in July 2020.

== Early life and education ==
Ramsay grew up in a small town in North Carolina where his family worked in medical textiles. He attended Dartmouth College, where he was editor-in-chief of a campus journal. He graduated summa cum laude with a B.A. in American Government. He also has an M.B.A. from UNC Kenan–Flagler Business School. He frequently works with his older brother, film and television director Julius Ramsay.

== Career ==
Ramsay began his career as a journalist and magazine editor before moving to Washington, D.C. He spent four years as the deputy chief speechwriter for Secretary of Defense Robert Gates. He then worked for Commanding General David Petraeus in Afghanistan as Petraeus' head writer and strategic analyst. Ramsay has also written speeches for former Secretary of Homeland Security Jeh Johnson, other four-star generals, presidential candidates, and Fortune 100 CEOs.

After receiving his MBA, Ramsay moved to Los Angeles and wrote and produced the independent thriller film Midnighters. Following its premiere at the Los Angeles Film Festival, the film was purchased and released by IFC in 2018.

Ramsay's second feature film, The Current Occupant, is a psychedelic institutional horror film based on his experiences working in politics. Actor Barry Watson stars as a patient in a mental asylum who believes that he is the President of the United States. Ramsay wrote the screenplay and worked as an Executive Producer on the film. The Current Occupant aired as an episode of the horror anthology web television series Into the Dark and served as the tenth episode of the show's second season. It was produced by Blumhouse as a Hulu Original for Hulu. Filming was completed two weeks before the COVID-19 pandemic suspended film production in the United States. A trailer was released on July 2, 2020 and the film premiered on July 17 on Hulu to favorable reviews.

== Filmography ==
Year	Film	Genre	Role	Notes
2017	Midnighters	Thriller	Writer, producer	
2020	Into the Dark	Horror	Writer, executive producer	Episode: "The Current Occupant"
