= The Neighbor (2016 film) =

- Theatrical release poster
- Directed by: Marcus Dunstan
- Written by: Marcus Dunstan; Patrick Melton
- Produced by: Brett Forbes; Patrick Rizzotti
- Starring: Josh Stewart; Alex Essoe; Melissa Bolona; Skipp Sudduth; Ronnie Gene Blevins; Luke Edwards; Bill Engvall
- Cinematography: Eric Leach
- Edited by: Andrew Wesman
- Music by: Charlie Clouser; Peter Freeman
- Production companies: Fortress Features; The Salt Company
- Distributed by: Anchor Bay Entertainment
- Release date: September 16, 2016
- Running time: 87 minutes
- Country: United States
- Language: English
- Budget: $1.5 million
- Box office: $164,348

The Neighbor is a 2016 American crime horror thriller film directed by Marcus Dunstan and starring Josh Stewart, Alex Essoe, Melissa Bolona, Skipp Sudduth, Ronnie Gene Blevins, Luke Edwards, and Bill Engvall.

== Cast ==
- Josh Stewart as John
- Alex Essoe as Rosie
- Bill Engvall as Troy
- Luke Edwards as Cooper
- Jaqueline Fleming as Officer Burns
- Skipp Sudduth as Uncle Neil
- Melissa Bolona as Sarah
- Ronnie Gene Blevins as Harley

== Release ==
The film was released on September 16, 2016.

== Reception ==
The film has a 67% rating on Rotten Tomatoes based on six reviews.

Kevin Maher of The Times awarded the film two stars out of five. Dave Aldridge of Radio Times also awarded the film two stars out of five.

Leslie Felperin of The Guardian awarded the film three stars out of five.
