= Pitfall (2025 film) =

- Directed by: James Kondelik
- Written by: Wai Sun Cheng; Victor Rose
- Produced by: Alex Bogomolov; Wai Sun Cheng
- Starring: Randy Couture; Richard Harmon; Marshall Williams; Alexandra Essoe; Jordan Claire Robbins; Matt Hamilton
- Cinematography: Rob Zawistowski
- Production company: Dragon Bear Pictures
- Distributed by: Voltage Pictures (international sales)
- Release dates: 15 October 2025 (Screamfest Horror Film Festival); 29 May 2026 (United States (theatrical))
- Running time: 108 minutes
- Country: Canada
- Language: English
- Box office: $71,935

Pitfall is a 2025 Canadian survival horror slasher film directed by James Kondelik and written by Wai Sun Cheng and Victor Rose. The film stars Randy Couture, Richard Harmon, Marshall Williams, Alexandra Essoe, Jordan Claire Robbins, and Matt Hamilton, and follows a group of friends and family whose wilderness camping trip turns into a hunt after one of them falls into a hidden spiked pit. It was produced by Alex Bogomolov and Wai Sun Cheng under their Dragon Bear Pictures banner and was shot in Vancouver, British Columbia.

Pitfall had its world premiere at the Screamfest Horror Film Festival in Los Angeles on October 15, 2025, and later screened at Panic Fest in Kansas City in April 2026. Voltage Pictures handled international sales starting with the November 2025 American Film Market. The film received a limited theatrical release in the United States on May 29, 2026, followed by a digital and video-on-demand release.

== Plot ==
Scott Williams joins his estranged sister Ashley and a group of friends, including Ashley's fiance Charlie, on a camping trip in the British Columbia wilderness. Following a night of tension among the group, Scott becomes separated from the others and falls roughly ten feet into a concealed pit lined with sharpened stakes, impaling his leg. As he struggles to free himself, Scott comes to realize the trap was not an accident but was deliberately set by a hunter stalking the group through the woods. Cut off from his friends and unable to move freely, Scott must find a way to survive his injury, warn the others, and outlast a pursuer who is picking off the group one by one. As the night wears on, buried tensions and secrets within the group resurface even as the body count rises, forcing Scott and Ashley to confront both the killer in the woods and their own strained relationship in order to make it out alive.

== Cast ==
- Randy Couture as Hunter, a ruthless killer stalking the group
- Richard Harmon as Lars
- Marshall Williams as Scott Williams
- Alexandra Essoe as Ashley Williams
- Jordan Claire Robbins as Gwen
- Matt Hamilton as Charlie
- Brenna Llewellyn as Monica
- Shanelle Connell as Katherine
- Teresa Laverty as Loraine Williams

== Production ==
Dragon Bear Pictures announced production of Pitfall, then described as an action thriller, in August 2024, with James Kondelik directing from a screenplay by Wai Sun Cheng and Victor Rose. The film was produced by Alex Bogomolov and Wai Sun Cheng under the Dragon Bear Pictures banner, with cinematography by Rob Zawistowski, stunt coordination by Brian Ho, and special effects makeup by Todd Masters. Principal photography took place in Vancouver, British Columbia, and the surrounding area, beginning in early August 2024 and wrapping on August 30, 2024. At the time of the production announcement, sales for the film were being handled by the Los Angeles-based agency The Exchange.

== Release ==
Pitfall had its world premiere at the Screamfest Horror Film Festival at the TCL Chinese Theatre in Los Angeles on October 15, 2025. The film was later selected for Panic Fest in Kansas City, Missouri, which ran April 9-15, 2026 with a virtual extension through April 19.

In November 2025, Voltage Pictures added Pitfall to its slate for the American Film Market, taking over international sales on the film following its Screamfest debut. A poster was released in May 2026 ahead of the film's theatrical debut. Pitfall received a limited theatrical release in the United States on May 29, 2026, playing in select AMC and Regal theaters on approximately 61 screens. The film became available digitally and on video-on-demand at the end of June 2026.

== Reception ==
As of September 2026, review aggregator Rotten Tomatoes reported a 52% approval rating based on 21 critic reviews.

Reviews were mixed. Aidan Kelley of Collider was positive, writing that the film "combines the slasher thrills of Friday the 13th with the survival suspense of 127 Hours". Mikkel Frederiksen of Film Threat also praised the film, writing that "Pitfall knows how to do one thing, and it does it well: letting you watch a psycho killer play whack-a-mole with hapless victims". Conversely, Phil Hoad of The Guardian gave the film two stars out of five, publishing his review under the headline "Pitfall review - big-hole survival horror is as if cast of Friends strayed into Deliverance". Joe Shearer of Midwest Film Journal was also unfavorable, concluding that the film's flaws made it "lean more toward disappointment than thrills".

Pitfall played in 61 screens domesticly, earning $28,495 domestiucly and $43,440 overseas, brigining its total worldwide gross to $71,935.
