= Cheaters (2000 film) =

2000 television film directed by John Stockwell

- DVD cover
- Genre: Drama
- Written by: John Stockwell
- Directed by: John Stockwell
- Starring: Jeff Daniels; Jena Malone; Blake Heron; Luke Edwards; Paul Sorvino
- Music by: Paul Haslinger
- Country of origin: United States
- Original language: English

Production
- Executive producers: Suzanne de Passe; Suzanne Coston
- Producers: Gloria Jean Sykes; Kevin Reidy
- Cinematography: David Hennings
- Editor: Eric Sears
- Running time: 108 minutes
- Production company: de Passe Entertainment

Original release
- Network: HBO
- Release: May 20, 2000

Cheaters is a 2000 American drama television film written and directed by John Stockwell and starring Jeff Daniels, Jena Malone, Blake Heron, Luke Edwards, and Paul Sorvino. It chronicles the true story of the 1994–1995 Steinmetz High School team that cheated in the United States Academic Decathlon (USAD). It aired on HBO on May 20, 2000. It was nominated for the Primetime Emmy Award for Outstanding Writing for a Limited Series, Movie, or Dramatic Special.

== Plot ==
In 1995 Chicago, Jolie Fitch is a junior at Steinmetz who enjoys Dr. Jerry Plecki's English class. Dr. Plecki is offered the position of Academic Decathlon coach, a job that all the other teachers consider a waste of time. Dr. Plecki holds an open call for students, but no one shows up. Jolie convinces him that he needs to look for the smarter students and recruit them. He recruits seven students (Darius, Matt, Paul, Dominik, Irwin, Agnieszka, and Jolie). They spend the next few months studying hard for the regional competition.

At regionals, the team faces its biggest competitor, Whitney M. Young, which has won for almost 10 years. As expected, Whitney M. Young wins, and Steinmetz places 5th overall but still qualifies for the state competition. The students are overwhelmed at the prospect of facing Whitney M. Young in the next round, but an opportunity arises when Matt receives a copy of the test. Irwin then brings it to Dr. Plecki, who believes that using the test is the team's best chance of winning.

After some persuasion, all seven members agree to copy the answers on various items (calculators, shoes, a piece of gum, etc.). Dr. Plecki then tells Irwin privately that because he had the lowest scores in the group, he will be out of the state competition; however, he will be guaranteed a spot in nationals. Though Irwin is upset, he agrees to go along with it.

At the state finals, Steinmetz meets Whitney M. Young again. The team successfully gets through the exams with the answers they secretly wrote down and with Jolie coaching them in the Super Quiz. At the end of the day, Steinmetz wins with an overall score of 49,000, raising the ire and suspicions of Whitney M. Young.

As Steinmetz celebrates, a spiteful Irwin writes an essay detailing how he feels betrayed by Dr. Plecki and how they received an advance copy of the test. Suspicions heighten when the principal questions Irwin. The Illinois Academic Decathlon board determines that the team will need to take a retest to validate their scores. If they refuse, they will lose their championship. Feeling betrayed by Irwin and angered by the board's ultimatum, the team refuses to cooperate and plans to seek an injunction to halt the state's retesting.

As the media siege escalates, Angela Lam, a student on last year's Academic Decathlon team, tells the press that Dr. Plecki gave her the answers to the Super Quiz at the state competition. She encourages the current team members to come clean if they cheated. Dr. Plecki is immediately suspended from his teaching duties, and the team members are interrogated individually at the Board of Education headquarters. Despite being pressured, they refuse to come clean and insist they did not cheat. However, Dominik ultimately confesses after a heart-to-heart talk with one of the investigators.

As a result, the state title is stripped from Steinmetz and awarded to Whitney M. Young. Dr. Plecki is fired from Steinmetz, and the team members are harassed by the other students for ruining their reputation. Dr. Plecki decides to leave Chicago in hopes that the media will disperse and leave the team members alone. He meets with his team one last time by Lake Michigan in downtown Chicago, where they present him with a gift: John Milton's book Paradise Lost signed by the team and the gold medal in Language and Literature that they didn't return to the board. With the team disbanded and Dr. Plecki gone, Jolie feels that she's lost a mentor who actually cared about her academic possibilities. In the end, Jolie gets accepted into college and recognizes the merit of her achievements without cheating.

In the epilogue, it is stated that Dominik, Agneiska, and Paul went off to college; Matt worked in a hardware store and was voted employee of the month; Darius' whereabouts are unknown; Irwin went to college to become a journalist; and Dr. Plecki got married and owns a business.

As a result of the 1995 cheating scandal, Steinmetz was banned from fielding an Academic Decathlon team for 10 years. They returned to the competition in 2006.

== Cast ==
- Jeff Daniels as Dr. Gerard Plecki
- Jena Malone as Jolie Fitch
- Blake Heron as Matt Kur
- Luke Edwards as Darius Bettus
- Paul Sorvino as Constantine Kiamos
- Dov Tiefenbach as Irwin Flickas
- Dan Warry-Smith as Paul Kurgan
- Anna Raj as Agnieska Maryniarczyk
- Dominik Podbielski as Dominik Wesolowski
- Karyn Dwyer as Angela Lam

== Production ==
Filming took place in Toronto and Chicago.
