= Malicious (2018 film) =

2018 horror thriller film

- Film poster
- Directed by: Michael Winnick
- Written by: Michael Winnick
- Produced by: Brett Forbes; Patrick Rizzotti
- Starring: Bojana Novakovic; Josh Stewart; Melissa Bolona; Yvette Yates; Luke Edwards; Delroy Lindo
- Cinematography: Felix Cramer
- Edited by: Michael Trent
- Music by: Jeff Cardoni
- Production companies: Impossible Dream Entertainment; Lost Hills Film Fund
- Release date: October 19, 2018
- Running time: 90 minutes
- Country: United States
- Language: English
- Budget: $3.5 million
- Box office: $1.2 million

Malicious is a 2018 American horror thriller film written and directed by Michael Winnick. It stars Bojana Novakovic, Josh Stewart, Melissa Bolona, Yvette Yates, Luke Edwards, and Delroy Lindo.

== Plot ==
A young university professor lives with his pregnant wife; they are in anticipation of their upcoming child who is a malevolent entity with murderous intentions.

== Cast ==
- Bojana Novakovic as Lisa
- Josh Stewart as Adam
- Delroy Lindo as Dr. Clark
- Melissa Bolona as Becky
- Luke Edwards as James Harper
- Yvette Yates as Emily Harper
