= Trim Season =

2023 film directed by Ariel Vida

- Film poster
- Directed by: Ariel Vida
- Written by: Ariel Vida; David Blair
- Story by: Sean E. DeMott; Cullen Poythress; Megan Sutherland
- Starring: Bethlehem Million; Alex Essoe; Jane Badler
- Cinematography: Luka Bazeli
- Edited by: Joseph Shahood
- Music by: Joseph Bishara
- Production companies: Paper Street Pictures; Execution Style Entertainment; HLBRK Entertainment; MeJane Productions
- Distributed by: Blue Harbor Entertainment
- Release date: March 31, 2023
- Running time: 100 minutes
- Country: United States
- Language: English

Trim Season is a 2023 American supernatural horror film directed by Ariel Vida and starring Bethlehem Million, Alex Essoe, and Jane Badler.

== Premise ==
A young woman named Emma gets fired from her job and struggles to pay her rent. While at a bar, Emma and her friend Julia meet a young man named James, who recruits them to work as trimmers for a marijuana farm.

== Cast ==
- Bethlehem Million as Emma
- Alex Essoe as Julia
- Ally Ioannides as Harriet
- Bex Taylor-Klaus as Dusty
- Jane Badler as Mona
- Juliette Kenn De Balinthazy as Lex
- Ryan Donowho as Malcolm
- Cory Hart as Christopher
- Marc Senter as James
- Paris Warner as Pua

== Release ==
Trim Season premiered in the United States on March 31, 2023, as part of the Overlook Film Festival, and it was given a limited release on June 7, 2024.

== Reception ==
On the review aggregator website Rotten Tomatoes, 88% of 16 critics' reviews are positive. Michelle Swope of Bloody Disgusting gave the film a positive review, praising its story, visuals, and practical effects, and calling it "a suspenseful, uniquely crafted story highlighting pain and sacrifice that should spark some powerful conversation around women and gender." Kyle Logan of ScreenAnarchy praised the film's "uneasy atmosphere", concluding that "Trim Season doesn’t succeed at every moment [...] but the highs are very high."
