= The Hurricane Heist =

2018 American film by Rob Cohen

- Theatrical release poster
- Directed by: Rob Cohen
- Screenplay by: Scott Windhauser; Jeff Dixon
- Story by: Anthony Fingleton; Carlos Davis
- Produced by: Karen Baldwin; Mark Damon; Moshe Diamant; Christopher Milburn; Danny Roth; Michael Tadross Jr; Damiano Tucci
- Starring: Toby Kebbell; Maggie Grace; Ryan Kwanten; Ralph Ineson; Melissa Bolona; James Cutler; Ben Cross
- Cinematography: Shelly Johnson
- Edited by: Niven Howie
- Music by: Lorne Balfe
- Production companies: Foresight Unlimited; Parkside Pictures; Windfall Productions; Tadross Media Group
- Distributed by: Entertainment Studios Motion Pictures; Lionsgate Films
- Release date: March 9, 2018
- Running time: 103 minutes
- Countries: United States; United Kingdom; Bulgaria
- Language: English
- Budget: $35–40 million
- Box office: $33.2 million

The Hurricane Heist is a 2018 American disaster heist action film directed by Rob Cohen, written by Jeff Dixon and Scott Windhauser, and starring Toby Kebbell, Maggie Grace, Ryan Kwanten, Ralph Ineson, Melissa Bolona, James Cutler, and Ben Cross. The film is about a maintenance worker, his meteorologist brother, and a treasury agent contending with a band of rogue treasury agents who plan to use a Category 5 hurricane to cover their tracks of a bank robbery. The film was released in theaters in the United States on March 9, 2018, by Entertainment Studios Motion Pictures. It received mixed reviews from critics and grossed $33 million against its estimated $35 million budget.

== Plot ==
In 1992, a category 5 hurricane named "Andrew" hits the town of Gulfport, Alabama. Will and Breeze Rutledge are evacuating from the destructive hurricane with their dad. However, their truck becomes stuck after avoiding the toppling tree in front of them, and they are forced to take refuge in a nearby house. While trying to save the truck from blowing away, strong winds blow a water tank and it crushes their father.

In 2018, another destructive category 5 hurricane named "Tammy" approaches Gulfport. Federal Reserve Treasury agent Casey Corbyn is ordered by fellow employee Randy Moreno to summon Breeze, who now works in maintenance and whose brother Will is a National Weather Service meteorologist, to fix the generator at a cash storage facility.

While she is out of the facility, rogue Treasury agents led by Connor Perkins infiltrate the facility and hold Moreno hostage. Their plan is to steal $600 million, and Perkins enlists computer hackers Sasha and Frears to crack the code of the vault. Failing to decrypt it, Perkins realizes that Corbyn may have changed it, so he has his men find her. Sasha and Frears have to use a brute-force attack using the town's transmission tower.

As Corbyn and Breeze drive back to the facility, they encounter the mercenaries, and Corbyn engages in a shootout with them. Will helps her escape with his Storm Research Vehicle called the Dominator, but Breeze is left behind and is captured and taken hostage, forced to repair the generator.

Will is upset when he learns that his brother is in danger. Determined to save him, he and Corbyn meet Sheriff Jimmy Dixon at his station. Unfortunately, Dixon reveals himself to be one of Perkins' cohorts and tries to take Will and Corbyn hostage. Corbyn shoots the sheriff, and they escape. When Dixon and one of his deputies chase them, Will manages to knock their car with his Dominator. Realizing that the tower is being used to crack the vault's code, Will and Corbyn manage to topple it moments before the decryption is completed. Perkins' men spot them and engage in a gunfight with them, but they escape. Dixon turns on Perkins, confronting him over a botched heist in the previous hurricane. When Dixon wants to claim all the money, Perkins shoots him dead and convinces Dixon's men to work together and find Corbyn.

While looting a mall, Corbyn calls Perkins and makes a deal for the release of Moreno and Breeze as long as she opens the vault and takes the money. When Perkins asks where the trade will be conducted, Corbyn tells him to meet them at the Gulfport mall. Meanwhile, Will and Corbyn make a plan to shoot the roof glass, causing Perkins's men to be sucked out through the roof. After Will talks to Breeze, who has arrived with the defecting Officers, Corbyn shoots the glass roof, sucking them out into the storm as planned. Corbyn, Will, and Breeze manage to hold on. After the storm surge, Corbyn gives herself up while Breeze rescues the stranded Will. Back at the Treasury facility as Corbyn and the remaining mercenaries arrive, Perkins breaks his deal to release Moreno and kills him as revenge for the death of his squadmates.

As the eye of the storm passes, Perkins and his men take the money, using three of the facility's truck trailers, along with Corbyn. Will and Breeze follow them. With the eye wall on their tail, Will and Breeze take over a truck. After a struggle with Perkins, the eye wall sucks the money out of one of the trucks and then the truck itself. Perkins is then killed after his own detached trailer crushes him. When Breeze's truck engine backfires and burns, Will and Corbyn transfer him to their truck. However, when they attempt to rescue Sasha and Frears, they are sucked into the storm.

Will, Breeze, and Corbyn manage to outrun the storm safely. Corbyn then jokingly suggests that they should flee to Mexico with the money as there is no witness, while the truck continues to drive off into the sunshine.

== Cast ==
- Toby Kebbell as William 'Will' Rutledge, a meteorologist
  - Leonardo Dickens as Young Will
- Maggie Grace as Casey Corbyn, a Treasury agent
- Ryan Kwanten as Breeze Rutledge, Will's older ex-US Army brother who works as a repairman
  - Patrick McAuley as Young Breeze
- Ralph Ineson as Connor Perkins, a corrupt Treasury agent
- Melissa Bolona as Sasha Van Dietrich, a computer hacker and Frears' girlfriend
- Ben Cross as Sheriff Jimmy Dixon, a corrupt local sheriff who is associated with Perkins
- Christian Contreras as Randy Moreno, a Treasury agent
- James Cutler as Clement Rice, Xander's brother
- Jimmy Walker as Xander, a minion of Perkins and Clement Rice's brother
- Ed Birch as Frears, another computer hacker and Sasha's boyfriend
- Moyo Akandé as Jaqi, Perkins' lover
- James Barriscale as Deputy Michaels, a deputy who works for Sheriff Dixon
- Mark Basnight as Deputy Gabriel, a deputy who works for Sheriff Dixon
- Keith D. Evans as Deputy Rothilsberg, a deputy who works for Sheriff Dixon
- Mark Rhino Smith as Deputy Baldwin, a deputy who works for Sheriff Dixon
- Brooke Johnston as Deputy Diamond, a deputy who works for Sheriff Dixon

== Production ==
In January 2016, it was announced that Rob Cohen had signed on to write and direct the film, then titled Category 5, with casting underway and a Summer 2016 principal production start set. In February 2016, it was announced that the film had been acquired for distribution in a large number of international locations via the European Film Market. In May 2016, it was revealed that Toby Kebbell had been set to star in the film. In June 2016, the rest of the cast was announced.

Principal photography on the film began in Bulgaria on August 29, 2016. In July 2017, the completed film, now titled The Hurricane Heist, was acquired for domestic distribution by Entertainment Studios with an early 2018 release date slated.

In the UK, the film was released by Altitude Film Distribution and was the second Sky Cinema Original Film.

== Reception ==
=== Box office ===
The Hurricane Heist grossed $6.1 million in the United States and Canada, and $27.1 million in other territories, for a worldwide total $33.2 million against a production budget of $35 million.

In the United States and Canada, The Hurricane Heist was released on March 9, 2018 alongside The Strangers: Prey at Night, Gringo, and A Wrinkle in Time, and was initially projected to gross around $7 million from 2,402 theaters in its opening weekend. However, after making just $950,000 on its first day, weekend estimates were lowered to $3 million. It ended up grossing $3 million, finishing ninth.

=== Critical response ===
On the review aggregator website Rotten Tomatoes, 47% of 60 critics' reviews are positive, with an average rating of 4.8/10. The website's consensus reads: "The Hurricane Heist is a throwback to the overblown action thrillers of yesteryear -- and a thoroughly middling example of why they don't make 'em like this anymore." Metacritic, which uses a weighted average, assigned the film a score of 35 out of 100, based on 12 critics, indicating "generally unfavorable" reviews. Audiences polled by CinemaScore gave the film an average grade of "B−" on an A+ to F scale.

Alonso Duralde of TheWrap criticized the film's direction, acting and overbearing musical score, saying, "Critics often lament that worthy films released early in the year are too often forgotten during awards season, so let's be very clear up front: For your Best of the Worst of 2018 consideration, in all categories, The Hurricane Heist." Andrew Barker, writing for Variety, gave the film an ironic recommendation, calling it the best worst movie of 2018 and saying: "All three of our heroes take time out in the middle of survival situations to discuss their undying love of football and the Second Amendment, but they also believe in climate change. If our divided country can't come together over a movie this wonderfully terrible, what hope do we really have?"
