= The Wizard (1989 film) =

1989 film by Todd Holland

- Theatrical release poster
- Directed by: Todd Holland
- Written by: David Chisholm
- Produced by: David Chisholm; Ken Topolsky
- Starring: Fred Savage; Luke Edwards; Jenny Lewis; Beau Bridges; Christian Slater
- Cinematography: Robert D. Yeoman
- Edited by: Tom Finan
- Music by: J. Peter Robinson
- Production company: The Finnegan/Pinchuk Company
- Distributed by: Universal Pictures (North America); Carolco Pictures (International)
- Release date: December 15, 1989
- Running time: 100 minutes
- Country: United States
- Language: English
- Budget: $6 million
- Box office: $14.3 million

The Wizard is a 1989 American adventure comedy-drama film directed by Todd Holland (in his directorial debut), written by David Chisholm, and starring Fred Savage, Jenny Lewis, Beau Bridges, Christian Slater, and Luke Edwards. It was Tobey Maguire's uncredited film debut.

The film follows three children, the youngest of whom is emotionally withdrawn but gifted at playing video games, as they travel to California to compete in a video game tournament. Known for its extensive product placement of Nintendo material, it officially introduced Super Mario Bros. 3 to North America, which then became the best-selling standalone video game. Despite receiving generally negative reviews upon its initial release, the film has garnered a cult following.

== Plot ==
Nine-year-old Jimmy Woods lives with PTSD after his twin sister, Jennifer, drowned two years earlier. Prone to wandering away from home, he perpetually carries around a lunchbox while frequently repeating the word "California".

Jennifer's death caused Jimmy's family to split: he lives with his mother Christine and stepfather Mr. Bateman while his older half-brothers Nick and Corey live with their father Sam. Exasperated by Jimmy's behavior, Christine and Mr. Bateman decide to commit Jimmy to an institution. Unwilling to allow it, Corey sneaks Jimmy out of the facility and they start traveling on foot for Los Angeles. Nick and Sam resolve to bring the boys back while competing with Mr. Putnam, a greedy bounty hunter hired by Mr. Bateman and Christine to find Jimmy but not Corey.

At a bus station, Jimmy and Corey meet Haley Brooks, a teenager on her way home to Reno. When they discover that Jimmy is innately talented at playing video games, Haley informs Corey of "Video Armageddon", a gaming tournament being held at Universal Studios Hollywood, with a grand prize of $50,000. Corey sees the tournament as an opportunity to avert Jimmy's institutionalization by showcasing his talent, and Haley agrees to help take Jimmy there in return for a share of the winnings.

The trio hitchhike cross-country, using Jimmy's skills to win bets on games. They eventually meet popular but snobbish gamer Lucas Barton, who demonstrates his ability to play Rad Racer with a Power Glove and informs Haley he will also be competing. Corey and Haley learn that Jimmy's lunchbox contains photos and mementos of Jennifer.

The trio arrive in Reno, gaining more money with help from Haley's trucker friend Spanky whom Haley coaches to success at a casino's craps table. Jimmy then begins training on arcade machines with help from the Nintendo Power Line. The children escape from Putnam to Haley's trailer where she reveals she wants her share of the prize money to help her father buy a proper house. Putnam finds Haley's trailer and captures Jimmy, but Haley summons several truckers who barricade Putnam on the road and rescue Jimmy.

After Spanky drives the children to the tournament, Jimmy enters and becomes a finalist after playing Ninja Gaiden. In between rounds, Putnam unsuccessfully attempts to re-apprehend the children. Jimmy, Lucas, and third finalist Mora Grissom compete in the tournament's final round – they have 10 minutes to score as many points as possible in Super Mario Bros. 3, a brand-new game not yet released in the United States. Cheered on by his family, Haley, and even Putnam, Jimmy wins at the last second, becoming the tournament champion and earning the cash prize.

As the entire family heads home, accompanied by Haley, Jimmy suddenly becomes restless upon spotting the Cabazon Dinosaurs, causing them to stop the car. They follow him inside, and Corey finds Jimmy looking at his photos of the family, one of which was taken at the tourist trap. They realize that Jimmy only sought closure where Jennifer was happy. Jimmy leaves his lunchbox at the site and the family resumes the car trip. Haley kisses Jimmy and Corey on the cheek. Jimmy then kisses Haley back on the cheek, who laughs along with Corey in the back of the truck as they ride off into the sunset.

== Cast ==
- Fred Savage as Corey Woods
- Luke Edwards as Jimmy "The Wizard" Woods
- Jenny Lewis as Haley Brooks
- Beau Bridges as Sam Woods
- Christian Slater as Nick Woods
- Will Seltzer as Mr. Putnam
- Wendy Phillips as Christine Bateman
- Sam McMurray as Mr. Bateman
- Frank McRae as Spanky
- Jackey Vinson as Lucas Barton
- Marisa DeSimone as Mora Grissom

In addition, Tobey Maguire has his first film role, an uncredited part as Lucas's Goon at Video Armageddon.

== Production ==
In 1988, a shortage of ROM chips and the preparation of a version of Super Mario Bros. 2 for the West delayed several of Nintendo's game releases in North America. One such product was Super Mario Bros. 3. The delay presented Nintendo with an opportunity to promote the game in a feature film. In 1989, Tom Pollock of Universal Studios approached Nintendo of America's marketing department about a video game film. Inspired by Nintendo video game competitions, Pollock envisioned a video game version of Tommy for younger audiences.

Nintendo licensed its products for inclusion in the film. During production, the filmmakers were granted approval from Nintendo regarding the script and portrayal of its games. Super Mario Bros. 3 was one of the products shown in the film and was used in a final scene involving a video game competition. Despite the film touting itself as featuring the first public reveal of Super Mario Bros. 3, the game had already been released in Japan during the previous year, with U.S. magazines such as Electronic Gaming Monthly and GamePro having already covered the Japanese version.

Filming took place between June 5 and July 25, 1989. In a 2008 reunion, and an interview in 2014, Todd Holland revealed that the original cut of the film was 2.5 hours long and included an extended backstory for Jimmy and Corey.

In an interview with Retro Gamer, director Holland admitted that he had some issues with the final script: "I argued with the studio that we were shooting way too much footage – more than we could ever possibly use [...] I lost the argument and was told flat out by Universal to shoot the entire script". According to Holland, the original cut of the film was over 2.5 hours long and that nearly an hour of footage needed to be deleted in order to make the film a suitable length for family viewing.

The deleted material was released in 2020 on the collector's edition Blu-ray of the film. Most of the deleted footage comes from the original cut of the opening act which explores Corey's home life in more detail, including deliberately antagonizing his older brother, his mother's emotional issues surrounding Jimmy and her divide from her former family. Nick's alcoholism is explored in more detail as well as additional clips from the road trip scenes. Trucker Spanky gets more screen time in the deleted scenes, explaining his role in more detail, and there are more clips from the final Video Game Armageddon contest.

== Music ==
- BoDeans – "You Don't Get Much"
- Patsy Cline – "Leavin' on Your Mind"
- BoDeans – "Red River"
- New Kids on the Block – "You Got It (The Right Stuff)"
- Real Life – "Send Me an Angel '89"
- New Kids on the Block – "Hangin' Tough"
- Martha & The Vandellas – "Nowhere to Run"
- Paul Carrack – "I Live by the Groove"
- Bobby Brown – "Don't Be Cruel"
- Paul Anka – "My Way"
- Sally Dworsky – "I Found My Way"

== Release ==
=== Box office ===
The Wizard debuted at No. 5, earning $2,142,525 in the domestic box office. At the end of its run, the film had grossed $14,278,900. Based on an estimated $6 million budget, the film was a moderate box office success, after which it became a cult film.

=== Critical reception ===
The film received negative reviews from critics. Multiple newspaper critics labeled it a feature-length commercial for Universal Studios Hollywood and Nintendo. Roger Ebert of the Chicago Sun-Times called the film "a cynical exploitation film with a lot of commercial plugs" and "insanely overwritten and ineptly filmed". He later called it one of the worst films of 1989. The Washington Post staff writer Rita Kempley wrote that the movie was "tacky and moribund", plagiarizing heavily from the 1988 film Rain Man. On Rotten Tomatoes, the film holds a 29% score, based on 24 reviews, with an average rating of 4.5/10. On Metacritic, the film has a weighted average score of 23 out of 100, based on 9 critics, indicating "generally unfavorable reviews".

David Sheff, in the book Game Over (1993), called it "less a piece of art than a one-hundred-minute advertisement for Nintendo that millions of families paid to see" especially for Super Mario Bros. 3. Levi Buchanan of IGN, in 2012, called it a "90-minute Super Mario Bros. 3 commercial".

Despite the negative reviews, the film was still popular enough to achieve cult film status and to receive a reunion screening from Ain't It Cool News at the Alamo Drafthouse Ritz in Austin, Texas, on February 8, 2008. Director Holland and stars Savage and Edwards were in attendance to take questions from fans.

== Home media ==
The Wizard was released on VHS and LaserDisc three times, in 1990, in 1992, and in 1997. By 1993, The Wizard grossed $6 million in video rentals.

It was first released on DVD in Region 2 in February 2001, and in the US and Canada (Region 1) in August 2006. The Blu-ray version was released in May 2018. A special edition Blu-ray was released by Shout! Factory in March 2020, with a new 4K remaster, audio commentary with director Todd Holland, never-before-seen deleted scenes, and more.

== Legacy ==
On September 6, 2016, PAX West 2016 concluded with a replica of the Super Mario Bros. 3 tournament from the film.

In Nintendo World Championships: NES Edition, the final Super Mario Bros. 3 speedrun challenge covering the first world is named "World One Wizard," referencing the film's tournament finale.
