= Jordan Claire Robbins =

Bermudian-Canadian actress and model (b. 1990)

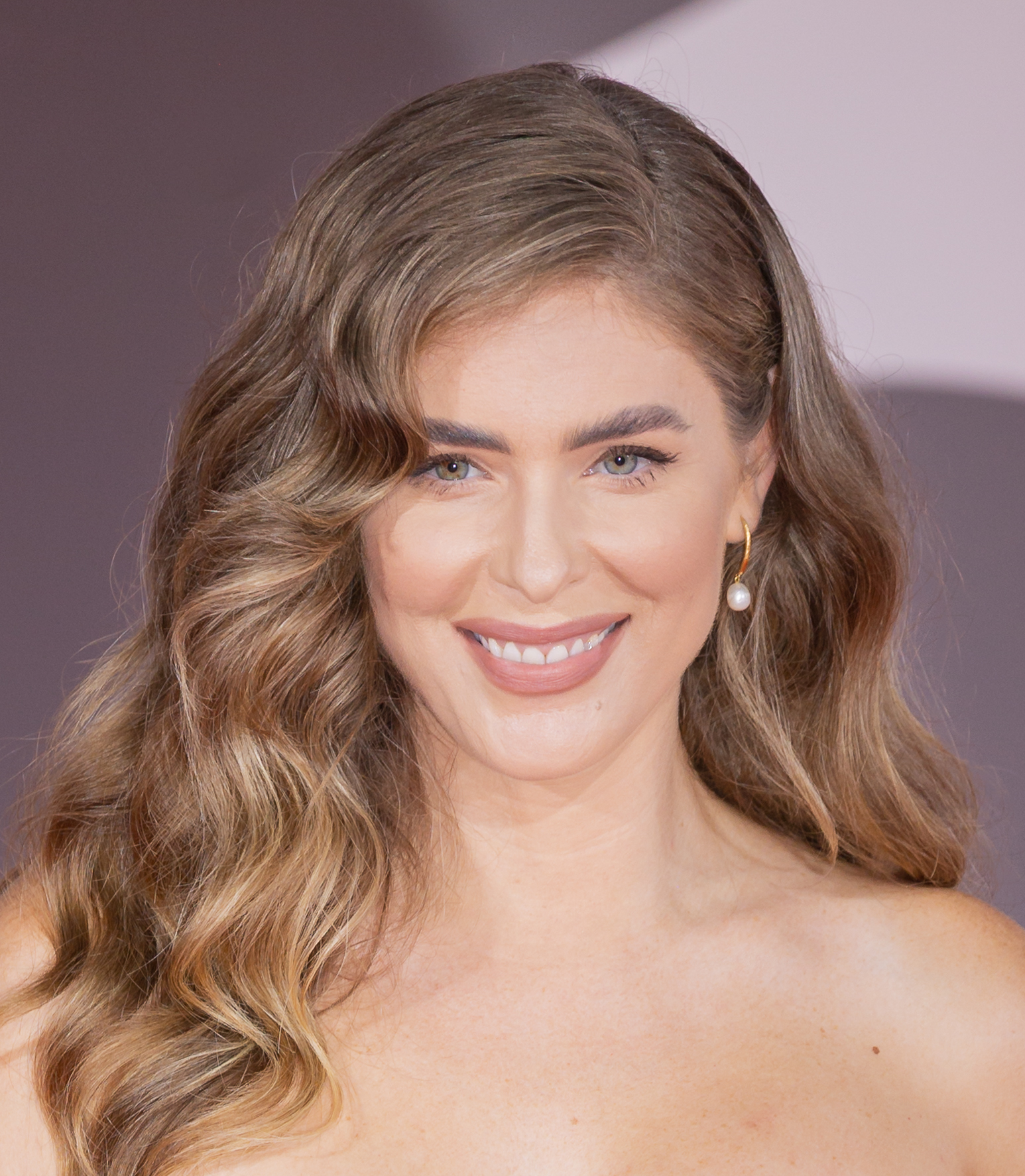
- Robbins in 2025
- Born: Jordan Claire Robbins; January 24, 1990 (age 36); Bermuda
- Education: University of Toronto
- Occupations: Actress; model
- Years active: 2015–present

Jordan Claire Robbins (born January 24, 1990) is a Bermudian-Canadian actress and model. Robbins is best known for her role as Grace in The Umbrella Academy television series.

== Acting ==
She began modeling and soon fell into acting while in Canada. She made her acting debut guest starring in the television series Man Seeking Woman, and thereafter had a recurring role in the series 12 Monkeys (both 2015). She continued appearing in various television series, including Supernatural. She had her breakthrough portraying Grace Hargreeves, a robot, in the Netflix series The Umbrella Academy (2019–2024), which has brought her widespread recognition.

== Filmography ==
=== Film ===
Year	Title	Role	Notes
2018	Anon	Elaine Selak	
2019	The Money Movie	Jackie	
2022	Escape the Field	Sam	
2025	Pitfall	Gwen	

=== Television ===
Year	Title	Role	Notes
2015	Man Seeking Woman	Julia	2 episodes
2015–2016	12 Monkeys	Assistant / Anita	3 episodes
2018	Supernatural	Jamie Plum	Episode: "Various & Sundry Villains"
2019	Christmas Under the Stars	Chelsea	Television film
2019	iZombie	Velma Charlet	Episode: "The Fresh Princess"
2019–2024	The Umbrella Academy	Grace	Recurring role; 24 episodes
2020	Fashionably Yours	Zoe	Television film
