= Mother's Boys =

1993 film by Yves Simoneau

- Theatrical release poster
- Directed by: Yves Simoneau
- Screenplay by: Barry Schneider; Richard Hawley
- Based on: the 1988 novel of the same name by Bernard Taylor
- Produced by: Jack E. Freedman; Patricia Herskovic; Wayne S. Williams
- Starring: Jamie Lee Curtis; Peter Gallagher; Joanne Whalley-Kilmer; Luke Edwards; Joss Ackland; Vanessa Redgrave
- Cinematography: Elliot Davis
- Edited by: Michael D. Ornstein
- Music by: George S. Clinton
- Production companies: Dimension Films; CBS Productions
- Distributed by: Miramax Films
- Release dates: October 1993 (MIFED (Mercato internazionale del film e del documentario)); March 18, 1994 (United States)
- Running time: 96 minutes
- Country: United States
- Language: English
- Budget: $8 million (estimated)
- Box office: $737,548 (USA)

Mother's Boys is a 1994 American psychological thriller film directed by Yves Simoneau starring Jamie Lee Curtis, Peter Gallagher, Joanne Whalley-Kilmer and Vanessa Redgrave.

Mother's Boys premiered at MIFED in October 1993 before being released by Miramax Films on March 18, 1994 in the United States. The film received negative reviews from critics and grossed $737,548 against an $8 million budget.

== Plot ==
Jude Madigan suddenly and inexplicably leaves her husband, Robert and three sons. Three years later, when Robert finally files for divorce, Jude returns and tries to reclaim her former life. Robert refuses and insists on the divorce. Jude does not accept Robert's decision. She tries, unsuccessfully, to seduce him and harasses Robert's new girlfriend, Callie. Eventually, Jude manipulates and convinces her eldest son, Kes that Callie is the only person standing in the way of their reunited family.

Influenced by Jude, Kes details a plan to his two brothers, Michael and Ben to scare off Callie, convincing them that it is just a game. As the boys debate the plan, Jude's estranged mother, Lydia overhears and confronts Kes and threatens to tell their father. Kes tries unsuccessfully to convince his grandmother that it was just a "game" and tries to stop her from calling his father. A brief struggle ensues and Lydia accidentally falls down the stairs.

While in the hospital, Lydia tells Jude she is not about to let her go through with her plans. She also tells Jude that her father "committed a great sin" against Jude, suggesting that Jude's father might have been molesting her from a young age (which might explain Jude's current erratic and sociopathic behavior). Lydia then goes on to say that she had planned on taking Jude away from her father (viewers are led to believe that this is the reason behind Jude's father's suicide). In a fit of rage, Jude then tries to murder her mother by asphyxiation but is interrupted by a nurse, Jude then flees the hospital. In a state of grief, Jude vandalizes her apartment by smashing the windows, furniture, and fixtures.

Meanwhile, the boys, under the guise of playing the game, handcuff Callie and put her on "trial" for destroying their family. They tie her to a chair but when Ben cuts himself on a broken glass, Callie convinces Michael to free her before his brother dies. She runs with him in an attempt to find a hospital.

Kes and Michael get in Callie's car and chase them, but the brakes have been cut by Jude and they go over a cliff, leaving them perched precariously on a tree on the side of the cliff. Callie manages to rescue Michael, but as she tries to rescue Kes, she slips and is left dangling from the car. Jude rushes to "help" by grabbing Callie's hand from Kes. Jude intentionally lets go of Callie's hand, who still manages to hang onto the car with her other hand. However, Jude loses her balance and falls to her death.

The film ends with Robert's emotional embrace of Kes, who is very shaken after having a nightmare of Jude coming back from the dead. Callie is right by Robert's side, comforting them both.

== Cast ==
- Jamie Lee Curtis as Judith "Jude" Madigan
- Peter Gallagher as Robert Madigan
- Joanne Whalley as Colleen "Callie" Harland (as Joanne Whalley-Kilmer)
- Vanessa Redgrave as Lydia
- Luke Edwards as Kes Madigan
- Colin Ward as Michael Madigan
- Joey Zimmerman as Ben Madigan
- Joss Ackland as Lansing, Jude's Attorney
- Paul Guilfoyle as Mark Kaplan, Robert's Attorney
- J.E. Freeman as Mr. Everett, Principal
- John C. McGinley as Mr. Fogel, Teacher

== Release ==
The film was released on VHS on September 14, 1994 and on DVD on March 16, 1999 by Buena Vista Home Entertainment (under the Miramax Home Entertainment label). The film debuted on the Blu-ray format for the first time on March 10, 2013 by Echo Bridge Entertainment. The disc has since gone out of print.

== Reception ==
Mother's Boys received generally negative reviews, with chief criticisms being that the film was a poor imitation of Fatal Attraction (1987). The film has a 43% on Rotten Tomatoes.
