= Homewrecker (film) =

- Directed by: Zach Gayne
- Written by: Precious Chong; Alex Essoe; Zach Gayne
- Starring: Precious Chong; Alex Essoe; Kris Siddiqi
- Release dates: July 26, 2019 (Fantasia Festival); June 26, 2020 (United States)
- Running time: 76 minutes
- Country: Canada
- Language: English

Homewrecker is a 2019 Canadian comedy horror film written by Precious Chong, Alex Essoe and Zach Gayne, directed by Gayne and starring Chong, Essoe and Kris Siddiqi.

== Cast ==
- Precious Chong as Linda
- Alex Essoe as Michelle
- Kris Siddiqi as Robert/Bobby

== Release ==
Homewrecker premiered at the 2019 Fantasia Festival. The film was released in select theaters in the United States on June 26, 2020.

== Reception ==
The film has a 74% rating on Rotten Tomatoes based on 34 reviews. Phil Hoad of The Guardian awarded the film two stars out of five. Alan Ng of Film Threat rated the film an 8 out of 10. Drew Tinnin of Dread Central awarded the film three and a half stars out of five.
