= Midnighters (film) =

2017 American film directed by Julius Ramsay

- Theatrical release poster
- Directed by: Julius Ramsay
- Written by: Alston Ramsay
- Produced by: Jarret Blinkhorn; Michael Bowes; Alston Ramsay; Burke H. Ramsay; Julius Ramsay
- Starring: Alexandra Essoe; Perla Haney-Jardine; Dylan McTee; Ward Horton; Andrew Rothenberg; Joseph Lee Anderson; K.C. Faldasz; William Bloomfield; David Spadora
- Cinematography: Alexander Alexandrov
- Music by: Chris Westlake
- Production company: Graystone Pictures
- Distributed by: IFC Midnight; Eagle Films
- Release dates: June 19, 2017 (LAFF); March 2, 2018 (United States)
- Running time: 94 minutes
- Country: United States
- Language: English

Midnighters is a 2017 American neo-noir thriller film directed by Julius Ramsay. It stars Alexandra Essoe, Perla Haney-Jardine, Dylan McTee, Ward Horton, Andrew Rothenberg and Joseph Lee Anderson.

The film had its world premiere at the LA Film Festival on June 19, 2017. The film was released on March 2, 2018.

== Plot ==
Midnight, New Year's Eve: when all the hopes of new beginnings come to life - except for Lindsey and Jeff Pittman, whose strained marriage faces the ultimate test after they cover up a terrible crime and find themselves entangled in a Hitchcockian web of deceit and madness.

== Cast ==
- Alexandra Essoe as Lindsey
- Perla Haney-Jardine as Hannah
- Dylan McTee as Jeff
- Ward Horton as Smith
- Andrew Rothenberg as Officer Verone
- Joseph Lee Anderson as Officer Campbell
- K.C. Faldasz as Vic
- William Bloomfield as Hotel Attendant
- David Spadora as Mike

== Reception ==
On review aggregator website Rotten Tomatoes, the film holds an approval rating of 81% based on 32 reviews, and an average rating of 6.18/10. The website's critical consensus reads, "Adding dashes of horror to a noir premise, Midnighters is a genre-bending chiller that delights as often as it scares." On Metacritic, the film has a weighted average score of 63 out of 100, based on 7 critics, indicating "generally favorable reviews".
