= The Grove (The Walking Dead) =

- The Walking Dead episode
- Carol prepares to shoot an unstable Lizzie after her sister's murder.
- Episode no.: Season 4 Episode 14
- Directed by: Michael E. Satrazemis
- Written by: Scott M. Gimple
- Cinematography by: Stephen Campbell
- Editing by: Julius Ramsay
- Original air date: March 16, 2014

Guest appearances
- Brighton Sharbino as Lizzie Samuels; Kyla Kenedy as Mika Samuels

Episode chronology
← Previous "Alone"	Next → "Us"
- The Walking Dead season 4

"The Grove" is the fourteenth episode of the fourth season of the post-apocalyptic horror television series The Walking Dead, which aired on AMC on March 16, 2014. The episode was written by Scott M. Gimple and directed by Michael E. Satrazemis.

Carol, Tyreese, Lizzie, Mika, and Judith come across a house in a pecan grove on their trek to Terminus and deal with the moralistic concepts of the world of walkers, an unstable Lizzie, and the admission by Carol of killing Karen to Tyreese. This is the final episode to feature two semi-regular cast members Brighton Sharbino and Kyla Kenedy.

"The Grove" received critical acclaim from television critics, who praised its "gut-wrenching" storytelling and the actors' performances. Upon airing, the episode was watched by 12.87 million American viewers and received an 18–49 rating of 6.4. This marks an increase in viewership and 18–49 ratings from the previous episode. Online television critics in later years have since generally ranked it as the best episode of The Walking Dead.

== Plot ==
Tyreese, Carol, and sisters Lizzie and Mika continue their journey to Terminus along the railroad tracks, while caring for Rick's young daughter Judith. Carol and Tyreese are concerned for the survival of the sisters, as Mika is too gentle and Lizzie appears to not understand what walkers are. They spot a walker get trapped by his legs on the train tracks, and Lizzie pleads with Tyreese to spare it, as it no longer represents a threat. Nearby, they find an abandoned home in a pecan grove, Carol suggesting they may want to rest there a few days. While Tyreese and Carol clear the house of walkers, a walker approaches the sisters; Mika is quick to shoot it in the head, while Lizzie looks on in tears. They secure the perimeter of the house and settle in.

The following day, Carol sees Lizzie attempting to play tag with a walker, and she runs out and kills it. Lizzie becomes upset and yells at Carol for having killed her "friend". Later, Carol takes Mika to hunt in the forest, but Mika finds she cannot bring herself to shoot a deer. When they return, they find Tyreese has managed to get the water pump working, and he suggests they may want to settle here permanently. Later that day, Lizzie and Mika go back to the train tracks, and Lizzie feeds the trapped walker a mouse; she moves in closer, preparing to let the walker bite her, telling Mika that the walkers "want me to change", but a group of walkers suddenly appear and the two flee back to the house. Their screams prompt Carol and Tyreese outside and all four use their guns to eliminate the walkers. Later that evening, Carol talks with Lizzie about why the walkers are dangerous and why it is necessary to kill them. Lizzie says she understands now what she needs to do. Mika says she does not want to "be mean" by killing people and Lizzie tells her you have to, but only sometimes.

Carol and Tyreese leave Judith in the care of the sisters as they go hunt. Upon their return, they find that Lizzie has stabbed Mika with a knife, killing her. Lizzie, looking happy, assures Carol and Tyreese that it's okay because "she'll come back." Lizzie tries to prevent them from interfering by holding a gun on them, insisting that Mika will be okay since she did not stab her brain. Carol calms Lizzie down enough to take the gun away, and asks her to take Judith and go inside with Tyreese while she ties Mika up so she doesn't wander away. Lizzie says she was about to do the same to Judith but Carol calmly points out that, as an infant, she can't even walk yet. Lizzie agrees and goes inside with Tyreese. Carol starts to cry as she mourns over Mika and slowly pulls out her knife to put her down for good. Later, Carol and Tyreese discuss what to do with Lizzie; he reveals Lizzie admitted to luring walkers to the prison fence using rats as bait. It was also Lizzie who made the bizarre splayed rabbit effigy back at the prison. Tyreese wonders if she was the one responsible for killing Karen and David but Carol reasons that Lizzie would have let them turn; however, her uncertain grasp on reality means she still poses a threat to Judith and others. Tyreese offers to take Judith and continue on to Terminus but Carol suggests that it would be unwise to divide their group. They both conclude Lizzie is too dangerous to be around other people. Tyreese says he cannot kill a child, leaving the onerous task to Carol.

The next day, Carol asks Lizzie to come outside to gather some flowers for Mika. Lizzie realizes Carol is upset and thinks it is because she'd pointed a gun at her. Lizzie starts crying and saying she was sorry but Carol, now crying also, insists she look at the flowers. She draws a revolver and shoots Lizzie in the back of the head, and buries the sisters' bodies. She returns to the house and gives the gun to Tyreese, admitting she had killed Karen and David to prevent the spread of an infection at the prison. She tells Tyreese to do whatever he feels he needs to do. Seeing that the taking of another life affects Carol deeply, he says he won't forget but he forgives her because it is not a decision she makes lightly. The next day, Carol, Tyreese and Judith leave the house and continue toward Terminus.

== Production ==
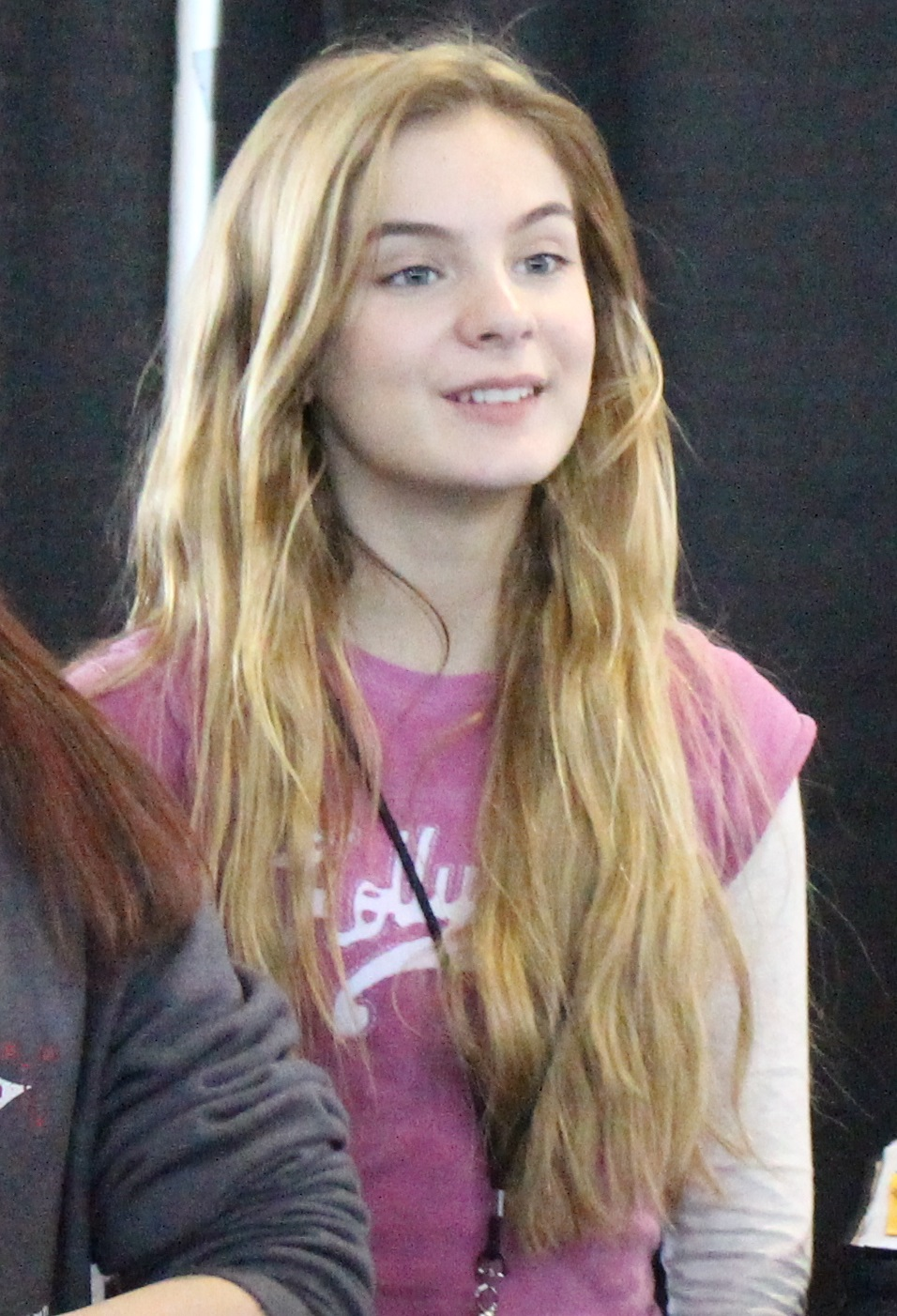
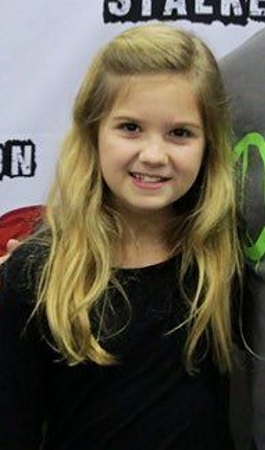
Brighton Sharbino (Lizzie Samuels) and Kyla Kenedy (Mika Samuels) made their last recurring appearances in "The Grove".

"The Grove" was written by executive producer and showrunner Scott M. Gimple, his eighth writing credit for the series, and second of the season after the premiere episode. It was directed by series cinematographer Michael E. Satrazemis, marking his directorial debut.

This episode focuses entirely on the characters of Carol Peletier (Melissa McBride), Tyreese (Chad L. Coleman), and recurring characters Lizzie Samuels (Brighton Sharbino), and Mika Samuels (Kyla Kenedy). On Carol's reasons for having to kill Lizzie (reminiscent to Of Mice and Men) and Carol's mindset in the episode, McBride explained:

No, I don't think there was really any other option. There's a lot of nature versus nurture going on in this episode to look at. As much as it broke Carol's heart to have to do this and to realize this had to be done. They were walking toward the flowers in that scene and Lizzie says, "You're mad at me and I'm sorry." You'd think she'd be sorry for stabbing her sister to death, but instead she's sorry for pointing gun at her, so she just doesn't get it. It's not a world that's safe for anyone. The ability to fight isn't a one-size fits all; everybody is different. Thematically, there's a lot said about change. Something I got out of this episode for Carol, too, is that you have to change. The world will change you -- you have to adapt or die. It's about hanging on to that part of yourself: You can change but don't lose yourself. That's what was happening to Carol -- her mindset -- she was so hell-bent on protecting these children that she lost a bit of something, and that was her nurturing aspect. She was missing a lot of stuff because her eyes were so set on survival.

On how the planned deaths of Lizzie and Mika would be shown on screen, Scott Gimple explained:

With Mika's death, that was something I wanted Carol and Tyreese to discover. I didn't want to see that happen. And I would love to take credit for an awesome idea, but basically that's how it happens in the book. It was discovered. It wasn't shown. It was very effective in the book. It worked on me when I read it and I knew that would be effective that way too. I don't think we needed to see that part of it. That's something where the audience's imagination will be far more horrible that anything we could have done. As far as the gunshot, we did wrestle with the cut of that. We played around with it in a variety of iterations. Initially it was about what we felt was tasteful to show and what we felt was not tasteful to show and figuring that out. I'd say the discovery along the way was the shot where we don't see it, but we see Carol pull the trigger and we stay on Carol. It's such a remarkable piece of acting that Melissa does in that moment that I wouldn't have wanted to cut away anyways, because really in that moment that is all about Carol. The die is kind of cast and this is Carol's story. This is fulfilling a big part of Carol's story in a very tragic way. And to see that character feel that moment and feel the gravity of that moment and the impact upon her and even just change her in that very moment — I actually felt Melissa's portrayal of that moment. I could feel it. So in the end it went towards storytelling anyways.

== Reception ==
=== Viewership ===
Upon airing, the episode was watched by 12.87 million American viewers, and received an 18-49 rating of 6.4. This marks a rise in total viewers and ratings from the previous episode, which received an 18-49 rating of 6.3 and 12.65 million viewers.

=== Critical reception ===
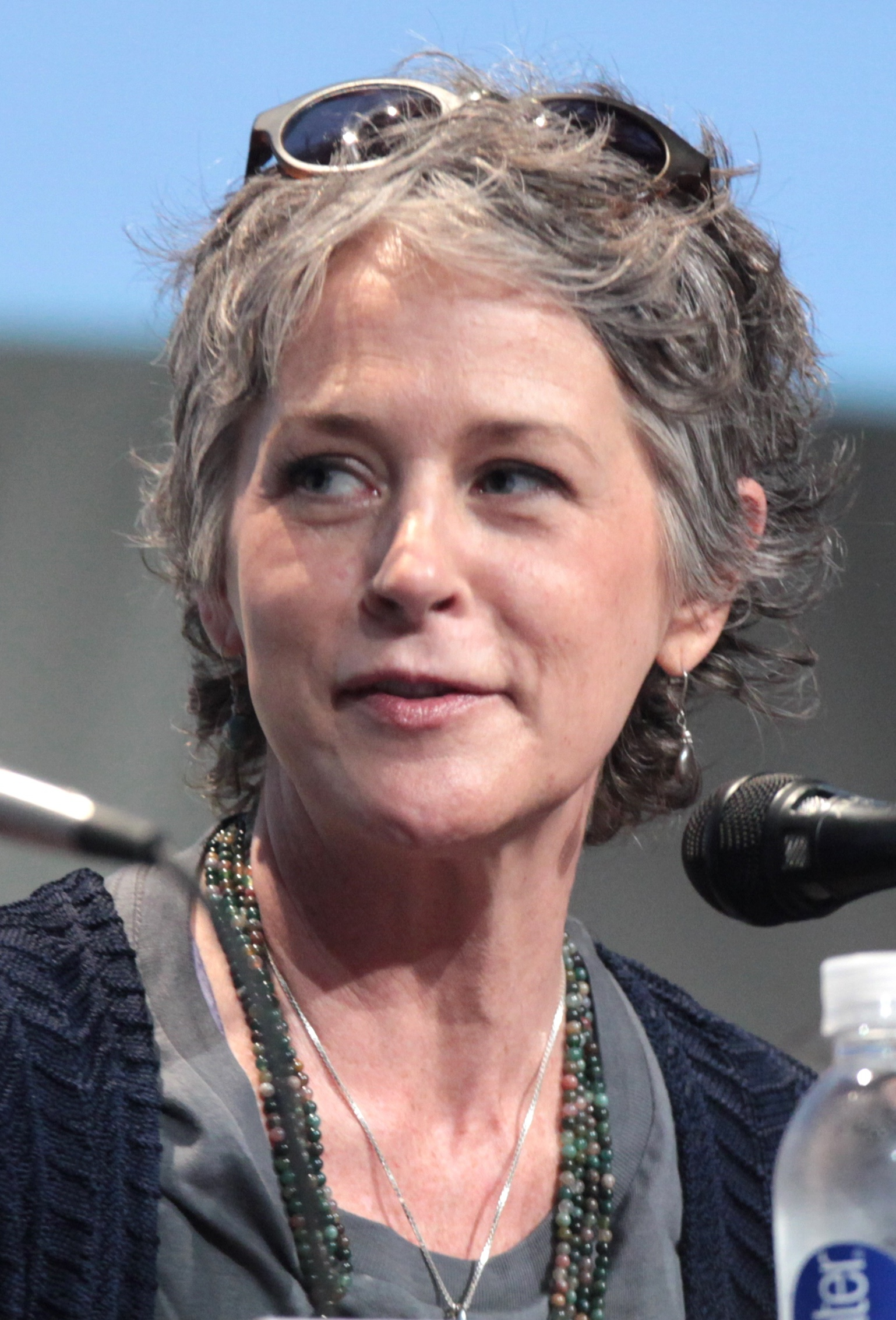
Melissa McBride received critical acclaim for her performance as Carol in this episode.

The episode received critical acclaim, with most reviews praising Melissa McBride's performance though some showed uncertainty in its ending. Lesley Goldberg of The Hollywood Reporter called the episode "one of its most gut-wrenching."

Matt Fowler of IGN gave the episode a 9.5 out of 10, saying "This week's Walking Dead took the post-prison group I least cared about and gave them the most surprisingly intense and emotional story of the bunch. Writer Scott Gimple and director Michael Satrazemis (the show's Director of Photography changing it up) brought us what the show does best - wrenching tales of loss both through the actions of others and that actions one commits themselves. And Gimple, being a huge fan of the Robert Kirkman comic series, lovingly lifted parts of this story from an arc in the books involving a couple of other characters, so those who've read up will have appreciated Lizzie's peculiar "tendencies."" He also listed it as the number one best episode on IGN's The Walking Dead: Top 10 Episodes list in 2015.

Allen St. John of Forbes gave the episode a positive review, calling it "a morality play. It comes down hard on one side of the nature versus nurture line." He then commented positively on the writing, saying

While much of the credit for "The Grove" goes to showrunner Scott Gimple, who also wrote this episode (with a nod, perhaps, to John Steinbeck's Of Mice and Men), there's a lot of credit to go around in an episode as strong as this one. As Mika, Kyla Kennedy was not only sweet but steadfast, and Brighton Sharbino (who also played Marty Hart's daughter in True Detective) played her confusion convincingly. Chad Coleman seemed like [he] had seen something he wishes he could un-see. As Carol, Melissa McBride drew on the deposits of strength and decency, that allowed her to do this without seeming like a monster. Indeed, when she pulled the trigger, her eyes brimming with tears, it reminded me of Jesse killing Gale in Breaking Bad. And first-time director Michael Satrazemis understood that less is more, and his cutaway to Carol's gun, and Tyreese's distant view, lent the scene the quiet dignity it deserved.

Paul Vigna of the Wall Street Journal commented on the cynicism of the episode, saying

Of all the sick, demented things that have happened in the zombie apocalypse on "The Walking Dead," it's hard to imagine any as shocking and sad as seeing insane little Lizzie standing over the sister she just stabbed to death, no concept of what she'd just done, fully expecting her to “come back.” Carol being forced to kill Lizzie was a close second. There's really no two ways about it, this was one of the sickest episodes of "The Walking Dead" in its entire run. All the darkest crevices of the human psyche come out in tonight's episode, “The Grove,” and while it's one thing when you see a character like the Governor do shocking, demented things, it's far more upsetting and uncomfortable to see a child, a little girl, doing them. But that's where this show went tonight. It's hard to imagine any other show on television would go that dark. You really have a build an audience up for it, because it's not an easy thing to swallow at all."

Zack Handlen of The A.V. Club gave the episode a C+, commenting negatively on the plot twists, saying "I laughed because it was just too much. The writers took a risk, and threw out another shock to catch us off guard: this time, it was a little girl so convinced that the zombies were her best friends that she murdered her sister. It should be horrifying, and if the episode worked for you, I'm sure it was. It didn't work for me, though, and the sight of Lizzie standing over that corpse made for a clean break in my mind. The whole situation became too ludicrously morbid, too absurdly grim to take seriously."

In later years, episode rankings made by online television critics have generally listed "The Grove" as the best episode of The Walking Dead. In his ranking of the top 40 episodes of the series before the finale, Matthew Chernov of Variety placed the episode at the highest position, stating that the episode is "a profoundly moving meditation on guilt, despair, remorse, and redemption", and is "a modern TV classic."
