= Inmates (The Walking Dead) =

- The Walking Dead episode
- Maggie Greene, Bob Stookey, and Sasha Williams put down the remaining prison newcomers, after they have been killed.
- Episode no.: Season 4 Episode 10
- Directed by: Tricia Brock
- Written by: Matthew Negrete; Channing Powell
- Cinematography by: Michael Satrazemis
- Editing by: Dan Liu
- Original air date: February 16, 2014

Guest appearances
- Alanna Masterson as Tara Chambler; Michael Cudlitz as Abraham Ford; Josh McDermitt as Eugene Porter; Christian Serratos as Rosita Espinosa; Brighton Sharbino as Lizzie Samuels; Kyla Kenedy as Mika Samuels; Cameron Deane Stewart as Christopher; Michael Harding as Older Man

Episode chronology
← Previous "After"	Next → "Claimed"
- The Walking Dead season 4

"Inmates" is the tenth episode of the fourth season of the post-apocalyptic horror television series The Walking Dead, which aired on AMC on February 16, 2014. The episode was written by Matthew Negrete and Channing Powell, and directed by Tricia Brock.

The other survivors of the prison assault deal with recent losses and decide whether or not to try reuniting with each other.

This episode marks the return of Carol Peletier (Melissa McBride), who has been absent since the fourth episode of season four. Scott Wilson and David Morrissey are no longer featured in the opening credits. This episode also marks the first appearances of Michael Cudlitz, Josh McDermitt, and Christian Serratos as Sgt. Abraham Ford, Dr. Eugene Porter and Rosita Espinosa, respectively.

Upon airing, the episode was watched by 13.34 million viewers, and received an 18–49 rating of 6.8.

== Plot ==
In a flashback, Beth narrates a diary entry discussing her hopes of a new life in the prison. In the present, she and Daryl are sitting around a campfire, having fled the prison. Beth insists that they must not be the only survivors of The Governor's attack, and demands Daryl help her look for the others. She then goes off on her own into the forest, with Daryl following in slow pursuit. They find some footprints, which Beth believes could be Luke or Molly's, and argues with Daryl that they're still alive. They also find human blood and signs of a walker attack, and are attacked by a walker who emerges from the trees. Eventually, the pair discover and kill several walkers feasting on human remains by some railroad tracks. Beth spots a small shoe, assuming it is young Luke and Molly amidst the remains and breaks down crying.

Lizzie and Mika are walking along in the woods, behind Tyreese. When they stop to ask a question, Tyreese turns around and is revealed to be carrying a still-alive baby Judith. As night falls, they find a clearing to rest in. Tyreese feeds Judith, while Lizzie sits on a nearby log, home to rabbits. She quietly removes her knife and kills them. The group is forced to flee after hearing walkers nearby.

The next morning the group finds a grapevine and begin picking the grapes. Mika is startled by a noise in the bush and runs off as Tyreese is changing Judith's diaper. Tyreese and Lizzie give chase, and find Mika hiding behind a tree. As the group recomposes themselves, they hear screaming in the distance. Tyreese leaves the girls, saying he has to go investigate and they need to keep an eye on a crying Judith. Lizzie covers Judith's mouth to muffle her cries. A pair of walkers nonetheless begins to close in. Mika attempts to warn her sister, but as Lizzie is quieting Judith she begins to slide her hand up over the baby's nose as well, becoming increasingly lost in the moment.

Tyreese comes upon a walker attack by a set of railroad tracks. Two men, Christopher (Cameron Deane Stewart) and another man (Michael Harding), are fighting off a group of walkers. Tyreese kills the walkers but is unable to prevent the men from being bitten. He then hears Mika's handgun fire off in the distance. As Tyreese begins to head back for the girls, the three of them, along with Carol, walk out of the bush. Tyreese welcomes her back, unaware of her exile by Rick. Before he dies, the older man (who attacks Daryl and Beth in the woods once zombified), tells Tyreese about a sanctuary up the tracks. The group follow the track, and come upon a sign promising "community for all" at a nearby place of safety.

Maggie, Bob, and Sasha are in the woods by a quarry. Maggie sharpens her knife on a rock, while Sasha bandages Bob's shoulder. Sasha tells Maggie they should camp there for the night. Maggie however sets off in search of Glenn, reluctantly followed by Bob and Sasha. Sasha is frustrated at what she sees as a waste of time; Bob, however, argues that the search gives their lives a purpose beyond mere survival. While walking, they come across the prison bus, which is shot up and filled with walkers who are prison survivors who either died in the shooting or were attacked and turned by those who did. Maggie insists on checking to see if Glenn is inside. After Bob says they'll do it together, and Sasha reluctantly agrees, Sasha opens the emergency door with the intention of allowing one walker to exit at a time. Eventually, the press of walkers trying to exit the bus proves too much, and Sasha can no longer hold the door. As the walkers attack, Bob and Sasha are forced to defend themselves. Maggie initially seems dazed, and is nearly killed by a walker before Bob intervenes. She then becomes enraged and begins to kill the walkers, repeatedly smashing a female walker's head into the bus before stabbing it. Maggie then goes onto the bus to see if Glenn is inside. After killing a walker that had been stuck inside, she sits down and begins to cry.

After awakening on a prison walkway that was destroyed by the tank, Glenn calls for Maggie. Despite his initial despair, he collects some clothes and supplies, including Bob's bottle of brandy, puts on riot gear, and then pushes his way through the walkers. After escaping the crush, he sees Tara, who has locked herself behind a fence. Glenn joins her and, after checking to see that her weapon was not fired during the attack on the prison, tells her they should go. Tara refuses, saying that she joined the prison attack and is thus responsible for its outcome. However, Glenn insists he needs her help. He grabs Bob's bottle of brandy and, using it to create a Molotov cocktail, throws it to ignite a car. While the walkers are distracted by the fire, Glenn and Tara escape the prison and reach the road near to the prison bus.

Tara describes seeing her sister Lilly being swarmed by walkers on the field outside the prison, and reveals Hershel's death to Glenn. She tells him "Brian" had told her the prison group were bad people. She'd believed him but sees now that wasn't true, and she cannot understand why Glenn would want her help. Glenn explains that he needs to find Maggie. After a small group of walkers attacks, Glenn collapses, wheezing, leaving Tara to kill a walker on her own. She looks up to see a military truck has pulled up. Tara yells at the truck for not helping, and three people climb out: Sgt. Abraham Ford (Michael Cudlitz), Dr. Eugene Porter (Josh McDermitt), and Rosita Espinosa (Christian Serratos). Abraham says to Tara, "You got a damn mouth on you, you know that? What else you got?"

== Production ==
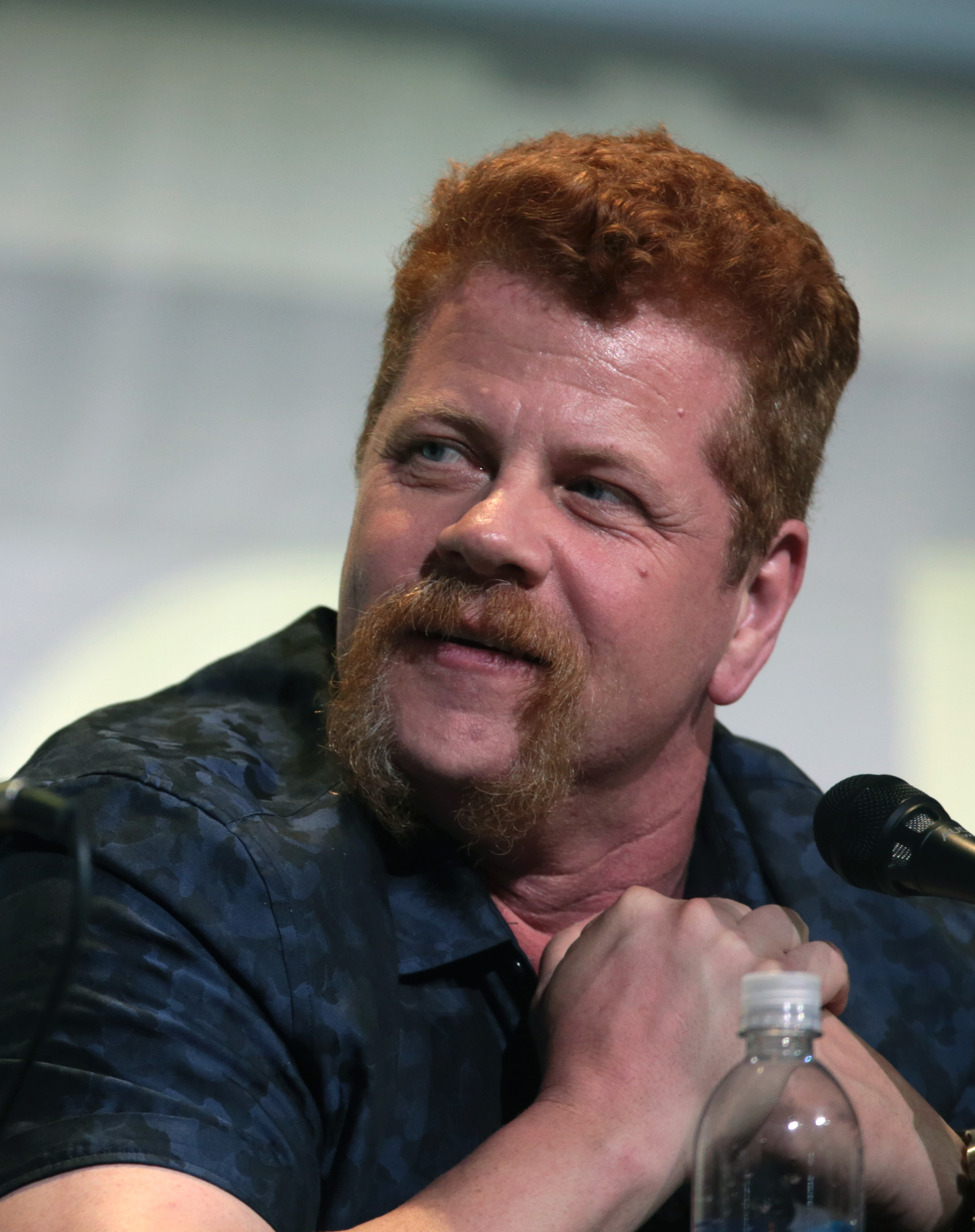
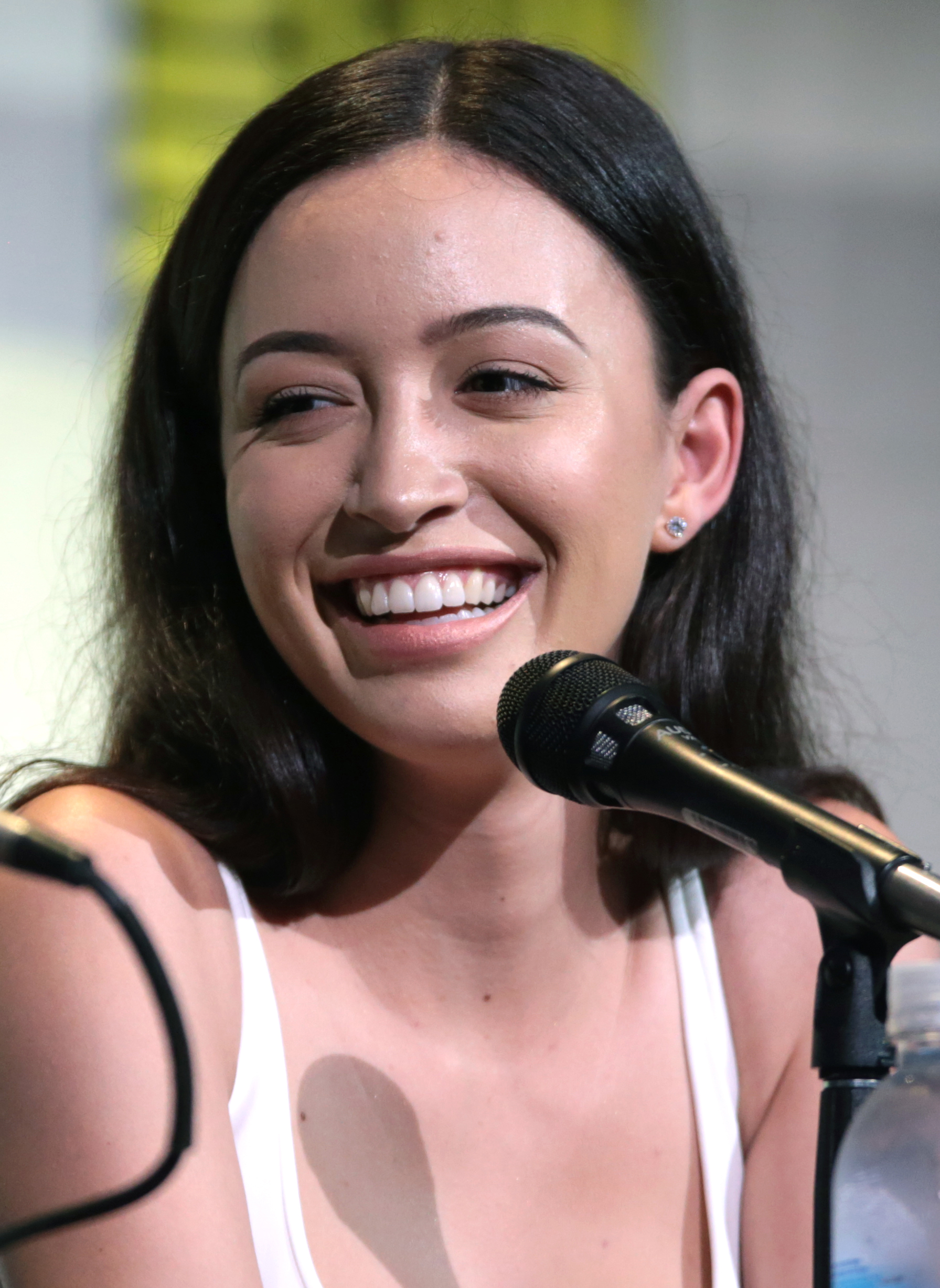
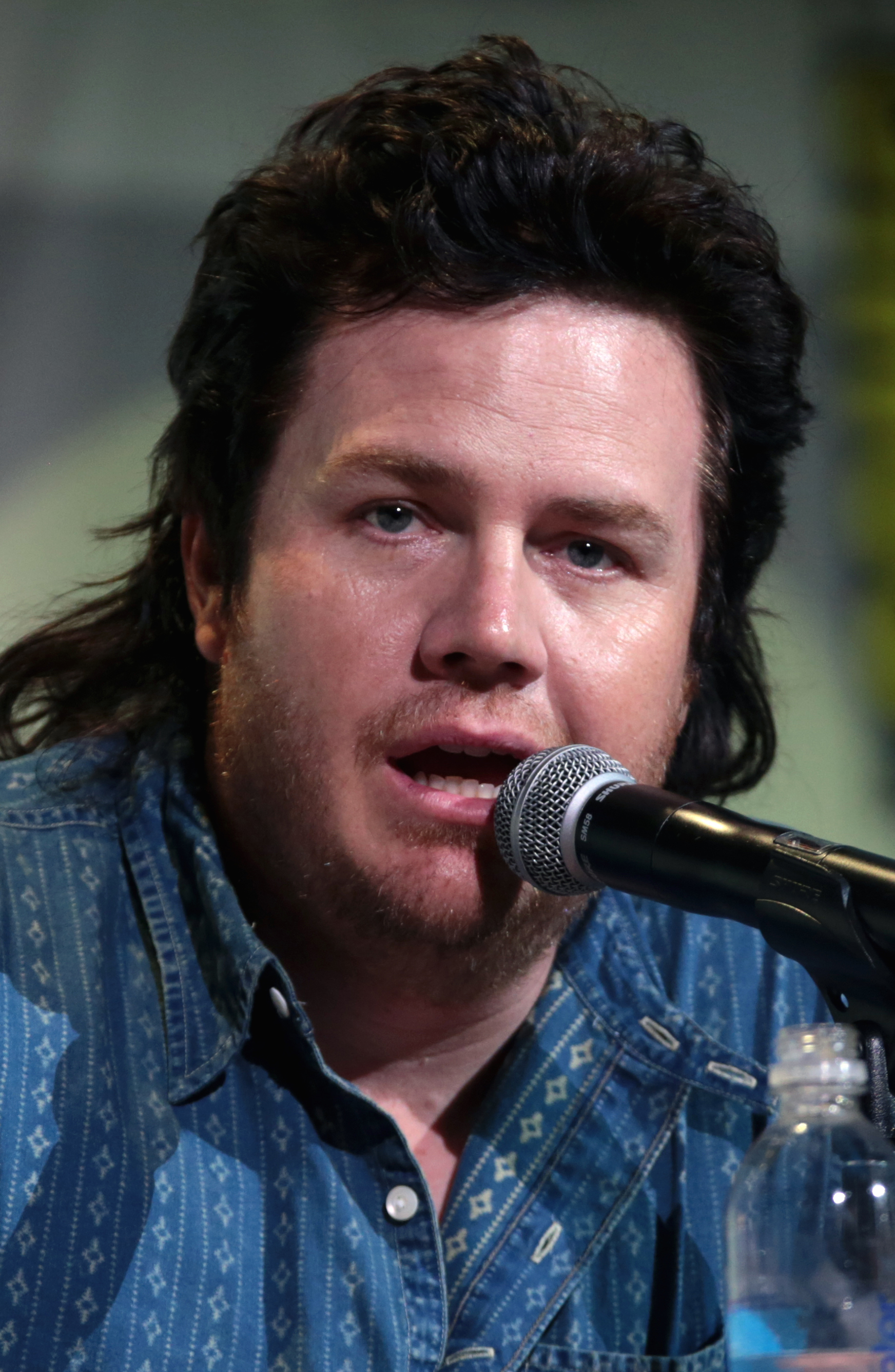
Michael Cudlitz, Christian Serratos, and Josh McDermitt made their first appearances as Sgt. Abraham Ford, Rosita Espinosa and Dr. Eugene Porter, respectively

"Inmates" was co-written by co-producers Matthew Negrete and Channing Powell and directed by Tricia Brock.

This episode marks the first appearances of Sgt. Abraham Ford (Michael Cudlitz), Dr. Eugene Porter (Josh McDermitt), and Rosita Espinosa (Christian Serratos), notable characters from the comic book series. On Abraham's character, Cudlitz said:

When we meet Abraham, one of the things that we realize most about him is that he's very mission-oriented at this point. You're not going to learn a lot about how he emotionally feels about things necessarily. He's very reactive. He keeps his eye on the target. He's not to be f---ed with. He will kill you.

On the difference between Abraham in the comic book series to the TV series and what to expect from Eugene and Rosita, Cudlitz said:

A lot of things happen in the comic that affect how he operates and how he moves through this world and the decisions he makes. A lot of that is ripped directly from the comics, as well as the whole chunk of time where the comic left off and where we meet them now. There are some elements that they've introduced that will make Abraham's back story that much more tragic. All three of those characters are going to seem extremely familiar to those who know the comics. They're almost exact up to the point where we meet them. Where they go from here, we'll all learn that together.

The final scene of this episode was intentionally shot and produced to look like the cover of "Volume 9", "Issue #53" of the comic book series.

This episode also features the return of Carol Peletier (Melissa McBride) after being absent for five consecutive episodes. She was last seen in "Indifference" when Rick Grimes (Andrew Lincoln) exiled her from the prison. Series regulars Andrew Lincoln (Rick), Chandler Riggs (Carl), and Danai Gurira (Michonne) are credited but do not appear.

== Reception ==
=== Viewership ===
Upon airing, the episode was watched by 13.34 million American viewers, receiving an 18-49 rating of 6.8. This presented a decrease in ratings from the previous episode, but still presented strong ratings. The show placed first overall in cable television viewing. The show also beat the 2014 Winter Olympics in 18-49 ratings for the night for a second week in a row.

=== Critical reception ===
The episode overall received mixed reviews from critics. Roth Cornet of IGN gave the episode an 8.3 out of 10, saying "On the whole, the pace felt better this week - though I enjoyed "After's" more focused-quality - and there were some decidedly juicy and tension-filled moments. A couple of factors prevented "Inmates" from really rising to the level of say an "Interment", though. There were a few moments where the series could have made a bold move, but chose not to, which deflated the momentum a bit, and some rocky exposition. The episode moved the plot forward with check ins on each of the prison survivors, the introduction and/or re-introduction of some key characters, and a path to a new, somewhat mysterious location. Ultimately, "Inmates" functioned mainly as a set-up for the remainder of the season."

Patrick Kevin Day of The Los Angeles Times commented positively on the episode's simplicity, saying "This episode wasn't full of compelling plot twists (well, maybe a couple) and it didn't do a deep dive into the psyches of the main characters. Instead, it was more of a housekeeping episode, doing the necessary taking stock of the large cast in the aftermath of the chaos of the prison's destruction." Marciela Gonzalez of Entertainment Weekly also commented positively on the series's characters, saying "I can only speak for myself, but I care. I probably care too much. The trials and tribulations of these characters are still captivating to watch — and recap. Therefore, while it's all nice and good that Rick, Carl, and Michonne are relatively okay, I still really, really want to know how the other survivors are doing."

Zach Handlen of The A.V. Club gave the episode a B−, commenting on the episode's inconsistent focus on the different characters, saying "the script's anthology-esque approach of spending a few scenes with several different groups of characters results in some stories lasting longer than they need to, while others barely register. Where last week's episode played like a cohesive unit from beginning to end, an hour in which, whether you liked them or not, every piece was designed to establish the struggle of survival and to answer the question of why it was so necessary to survive in the first place, "Inmates" continues these themes (just about everyone is trying to decide whether or not they should go look for other survivors; just about everyone is strung out with grief and fear and worry), but never becomes more than a collection of modestly interesting moments. That's always the challenge of serialization on television: trying to make table-setting hours into something like a full meal."

Erik Kain of Forbes gave the episode a negative review regarding the show's presentation of the characters, saying "All told, a decent but irritating episode of The Walking Dead, bogged down once again by the show's oldest problems. I know this is a TV series about zombies, but I'd really like to see the living, breathing, human characters start acting like real people at some point. I'm still enjoying The Walking Dead, but as a character drama it's coming up short of greatness. My high hopes for Season 4 have dropped, and the show struggles to push past the sort of cozy, entertaining mediocrity that defines an episode like this one."
