= Consumed (The Walking Dead) =

- The Walking Dead episode
- Surrounded by walkers, Carol and Daryl hold on tight as a van is tipping over a bridge.
- Episode no.: Season 5 Episode 6
- Directed by: Seith Mann
- Written by: Matthew Negrete; Corey Reed
- Cinematography by: Michael E. Satrazemis
- Editing by: Julius Ramsay; Dan Liu
- Original air date: November 16, 2014

Guest appearances
- Tyler James Williams as Noah; Ricky Wayne as Officer O'Donnell

Episode chronology
← Previous "Self Help"	Next → "Crossed"
- The Walking Dead season 5

"Consumed" is the sixth episode of the fifth season of the post-apocalyptic horror television series The Walking Dead which aired on AMC on November 16, 2014. The episode was written by Matthew Negrete and Corey Reed, and directed by Seith Mann. The episode primarily focuses on Carol Peletier (Melissa McBride) as she accompanies Daryl Dixon (Norman Reedus) in searching for Beth Greene (Emily Kinney). Several flashbacks in the episode explore the different stages in Carol's life, such as her rescue mission to save the group and several tragedies she is attempting to rebound from, including the deaths of her surrogate daughters, Lizzie Samuels and her sister, Mika, as well as the lasting effect of her banishment. The title of the episode refers to Carol's explaining to Daryl about the events in her life and how she has changed, saying that "everything now just... consumes you".

Such themes as domestic abuse, death, change, and hope are prevalent throughout "Consumed". The episode prominently conveys the background abuse that both characters share, which past episodes indicated was the basis of their intimate bonding. It also sheds light on their transformations in the apocalypse and how they adapted as a result. Through this, fire is also prevalent within the episode and used precisely 10 times in various ways of showing Carol, in particular, changing as a result of various events. The episode provides an explanation to several cliffhangers in preceding episodes with the heavily utilized nonlinear narrative. This includes the revelation of how Carol ended up in Grady Memorial Hospital from the cliffhanger in "Slabtown", and the mysterious person in the woods with Daryl at the end of "Four Walls and a Roof" is revealed to be Noah.

"Consumed" has garnered critical praise from television commentators, who lauded the exploration of the characters' compelling histories and subtext, the return to cityscape in Atlanta, a prominent location used in the first season, and the performances by Melissa McBride and Norman Reedus. Others noted the slow pacing as a highlight, allowing a more contemplative narrative and better character focus.

== Plot ==
In a flashback, after being exiled by Rick, (Note: As depicted in Indifference.) Carol finds the West Georgia Correctional Facility from smoke rising from the prison in the aftermath of the Governor's attack. (Note: As depicted in Too Far Gone.)

After the church feast, Carol and Daryl follow a car with a white cross deep into Atlanta. They discover that the driver is a police officer. Before they can continue following him, the car runs out of gas. Walkers attack, and they abandon the car to take shelter in a women's domestic abuse shelter, where Carol had previously been due to Ed's abuse.

The next morning, Daryl and Carol choose a tall office building to scout Atlanta. They move through a connected parking garage, unaware they are being followed. They enter an office, and Daryl spots a white van with white crosses hanging over an overpass. The stalker, revealed to be Noah, ambushes them. Noah takes their weapons before fleeing. Carol aims her revolver at Noah, but Daryl stops her from shooting. The pair reach the van, but attract a large group of walkers. They search the van for clues, finding a stretcher from Grady Memorial Hospital, and deduce that is where Beth is. Trapped by walkers, they use their body weight to push the van over the edge. They survive the crash, but Carol is left with a shoulder injury.

The two survey the hospital from a prominent building overlooking the area. They find a walker immobilized by a crossbow bolt. Knowing Noah is near, they move through the building and find Noah trapped beneath a bookcase with a walker on top of it. Daryl wishes to leave Noah behind, but Carol chooses to save him upon learning that Noah knows Beth. Noah warns them about incoming police officers, and the three leave together. Carol is struck by a police cruiser while Daryl lags to help an injured Noah. Noah tells Daryl to not interfere while Carol is taken away, as Carol can be treated at Grady.

Noah tells him the hospital will be difficult to infiltrate. Together, they commandeer a truck and escape Atlanta to enlist the help of Rick and the rest of the group.

== Reception ==
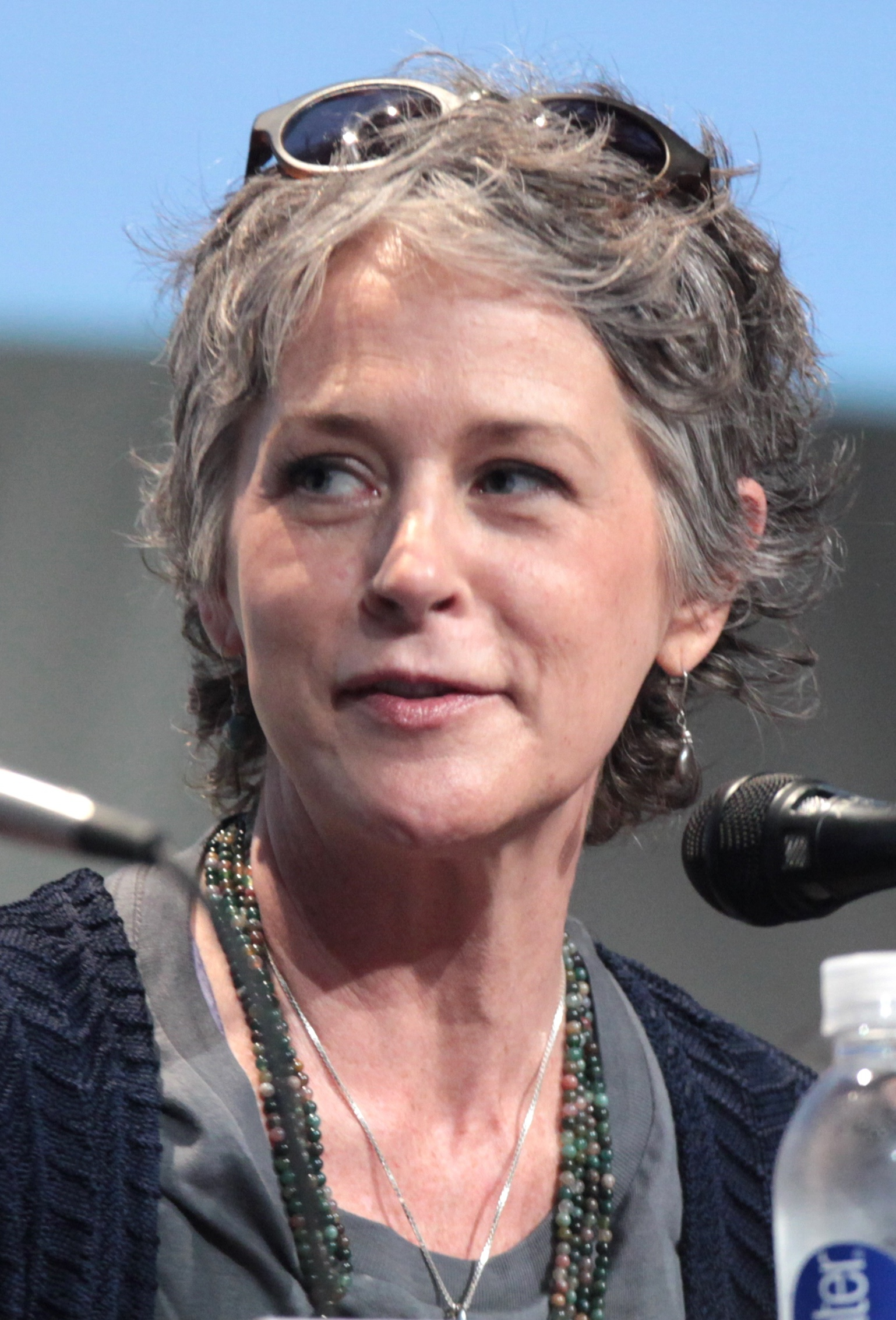
Melissa McBride's performance was particularly praised by television commentators.

Upon airing, the episode was watched by 14.07 million American viewers with an 18-49 rating of 7.3, an increase in viewership from the previous week which had 13.53 million viewers and an 18-49 rating of 6.9.

In the United Kingdom, the episode was viewed by 1.136 million viewers, making it the highest-rated broadcast that week. It also received 70 thousand timeshift viewers. In Australia, it received 90 thousand viewers, making it the highest-rated cable broadcast that day.

The episode received positive reviews by television critics.

Zack Handlen of The A.V. Club gave the episode an A− grade. He praised Melissa McBride's portrayal of Carol Peletier, saying, "McBride is especially great; while her character’s evolution came in fits and starts, the actress manages to pull all of that together into a consistent, and endlessly fascinating, persona." He also praised the scene of the burning bodies in the episode, saying:

"This is a large part of why The Walking Dead has gotten so good this season: The writers have found a way to exploit subtext and history in compelling, haunting ways. The constant threat of death keeps moments like Carol and Daryl’s encounter with the mom and daughter zombie pair (in another beautiful touch, Daryl takes care of the pair while Carol is sleeping; Carol and Daryl do a fair bit of talking through this episode, but the sight of him burning those bodies wrapped in blankets says more about their friendship than any words) from becoming completely stress free, but the real crisis is about trying to move on through an environment that seems to require you to be unthinkingly ruthless. Everyone has been thrown time and again into situations where the only way forward is to sacrifice some small part of your humanity—and yet those parts never really go away. And every walker is a reminder of what happens when you have no humanity left."

Matt Fowler of IGN rated it an 8.8 out of 10 and said, "For a terse Carol/Daryl adventure, "Consumed" triumphed in both landscape and tone, though it was hindered a bit by us knowing that nothing all that big was going to happen. It was, essentially, the final piece of the puzzle to fall into place after episodes three and four. It was mostly quiet, but rewarding nonetheless."

Rebecca Hawkes of The Daily Telegraph gave the episode 5 stars, writing that "while Consumed wasn’t a “big” episode in any sense, it was possibly one of this season’s most impressive: a reflective, rather melancholy two-hander that showed its actors at their best." In particular, she praised the performance of Melissa McBride, who she said was "in a league of her own, capable of quietly dominating every scene she’s in."
