= What Happened and What's Going On =

- The Walking Dead episode
- Tyreese hallucinates his past demons moments after being bitten by a walker.
- Episode no.: Season 5 Episode 9
- Directed by: Greg Nicotero
- Written by: Scott M. Gimple
- Cinematography by: Michael E. Satrazemis
- Editing by: Avi Youabian; Evan Schrodek
- Original air date: February 8, 2015

Guest appearances
- Tyler James Williams as Noah; David Morrissey as The Governor; Chris Coy as Martin; Brighton Sharbino as Lizzie Samuels; Kyla Kenedy as Mika Samuels

Episode chronology
← Previous "Coda"	Next → "Them"
- The Walking Dead season 5

"What Happened and What's Going On" is the ninth episode and mid-season premiere of the fifth season of the post-apocalyptic horror television series The Walking Dead, which aired on AMC on February 8, 2015. It marks Chad L. Coleman's final appearance as series regular Tyreese. It also features several appearances from deceased characters in Tyreese's hallucinations. The episode was written by series showrunner Scott M. Gimple and directed by Greg Nicotero.

The narrative takes place in Richmond, Virginia, marking the first time the series is not set in Georgia. It takes place 17 days after Beth Greene's (Emily Kinney) death as the group finds Noah's walled community known as "Shirewilt Estates", a nod to a similar location in the comic book series. The episode primarily focuses on Tyreese, his struggle accepting death, and the guilt he faces over the losses of other group members due to actions he believes he could have done differently. The opening montage intercuts among a funeral that appears to be Beth's and previous sanctuaries: Woodbury, the prison, and Shirewilt. The ending reveals the funeral is Tyreese's. Several deceased characters return as hallucinations such as Martin (Chris Coy), Bob Stookey (Lawrence Gilliard Jr.), The Governor (David Morrissey), Lizzie and Mika Samuels (Brighton Sharbino and Kyla Kenedy), and Beth Greene. This episode also includes an acoustic cover version of Jimmy Cliff's "Struggling Man" sung by Beth.

The episode was lauded by television commentators, who praised Coleman's performance, Nicotero's direction, and Gimple's script. Others noted Tyreese's death as shocking and well-handled.

== Plot ==
Still reeling from Beth's death, (Note: As depicted in Coda.) the group decides to honor her by helping Noah reunite with his family at the walled Shirewilt Estates community near Richmond. Rick, Michonne, Tyreese, Glenn and Noah scout Shirewilt. On a brick wall, they find graffiti stating "WOLVES NOT FAR". Noah breaks down and is comforted by Tyreese.

Tyreese tells Noah that he lost hope after Karen's death. However, his decision to continue living allowed him to keep Judith safe. Noah suddenly stands and sprints to his family home. They enter the house to confirm Noah's family's fate. While looking at photos of Noah's family, Tyreese is bitten by Noah's undead brother. Noah kills his brother and leaves to retrieve Rick and the others. Tyreese suffers from severe blood loss and hallucinates visits from Martin, Bob, the Governor, Lizzie and Mika, and Beth Greene. Tyreese is attacked by another walker, who bites Tyreese again.

Meanwhile, Michonne expresses a desire to settle in Shirewilt, but Rick argues that the town is indefensible. However, they agree to travel to DC. Tyreese battles with hallucinations of comfort from Bob, Beth, and the girls, as well as antagonizing insults from Martin and the Governor. Noah leads Rick and Michonne to Tyreese, and Michonne uses her katana to amputate Tyreese's arm. They fight through a horde of walkers, passing by quadruple amputee walkers with the letter W carved into their foreheads.

During the ride back, Tyreese accepts his death before passing away due to the infection. The group holds a funeral for him, which Gabriel presides over.

== Production ==
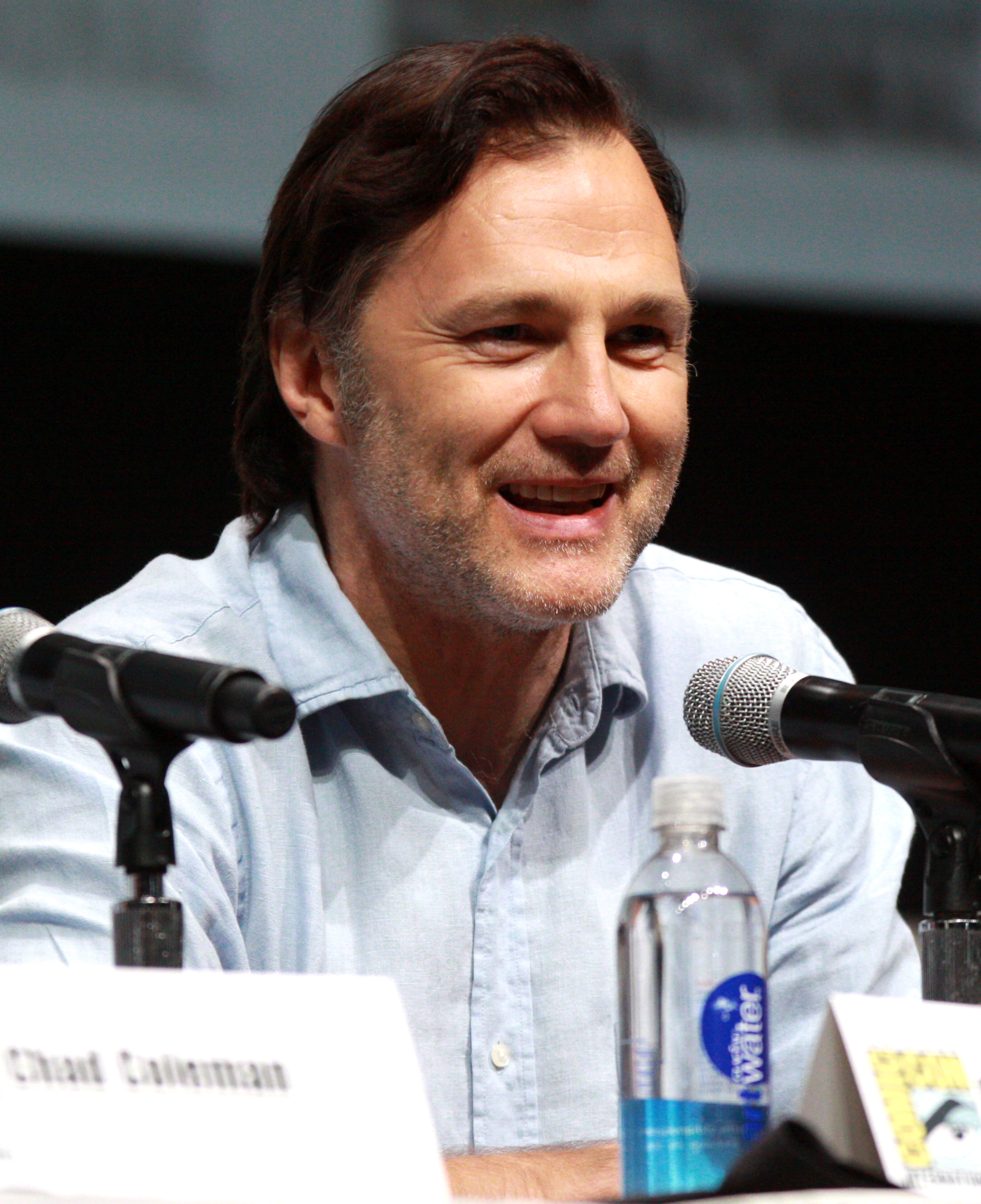
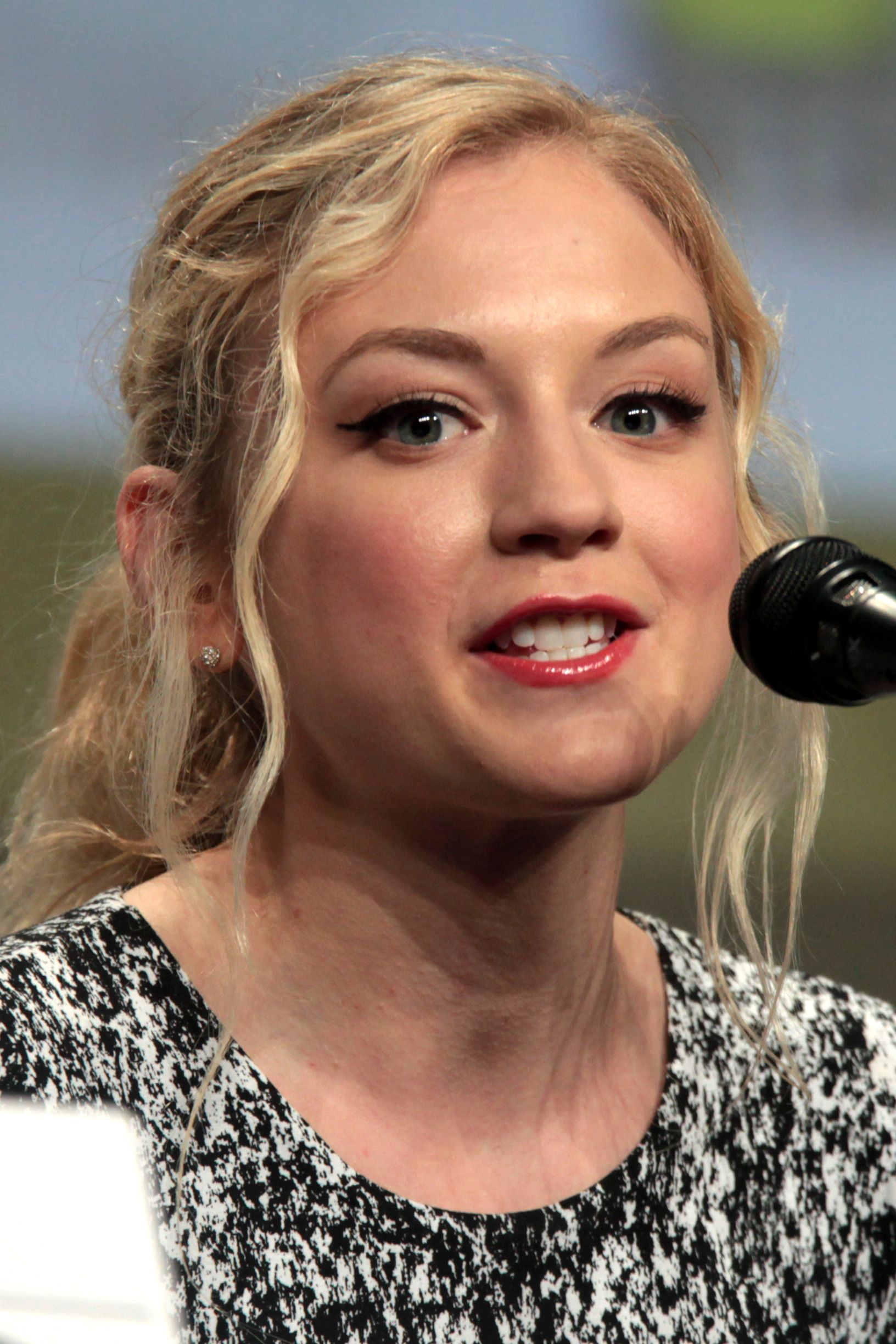
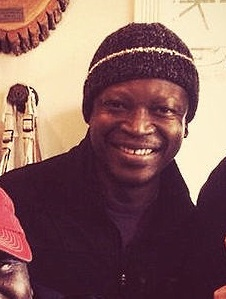
David Morrissey (The Governor) (left), Emily Kinney (Beth Greene) (center), and Lawrence Gilliard Jr. (Bob Stookey) (right) reprise their respective roles as Tyreese's hallucinations.

"What Happened and What's Going On" was written by executive producer and showrunner Gimple and directed by executive producer and special make-up effects supervisor Nicotero. The episode features several guest appearances by actors whose characters were killed off in previous episodes, including Kinney as Beth, Gilliard Jr. as Bob, Morrissey as The Governor, Sharbino as Lizzie, Kenedy as Mika, and Coy as Martin. Lincoln, in his natural accent, provided the voice of the radio broadcaster.

This episode marks Chad L. Coleman's final appearance as a series regular, as Tyreese was killed off in the episode. On the decision to kill Tyreese, Gimple explained:

"There is never a right time; this was the time the story seemed to dictate. Not just for this episode but for the story moving forward. The cumulative effect of the last eight episodes and then this ninth episode, moving into next few, it's all a cumulative effect of who these people are and the circumstances they eventually find themselves in. It's weird to say, "This was the time" because it's such a painful thing. It just seemed to be what the story dictated."

The episode features a homage to the comic book series as Noah's community of 20 people is known as "Shirewilt Estates". The name comes from the prominent location, "Wiltshire Estates" in "Miles Behind Us".

== Reception ==
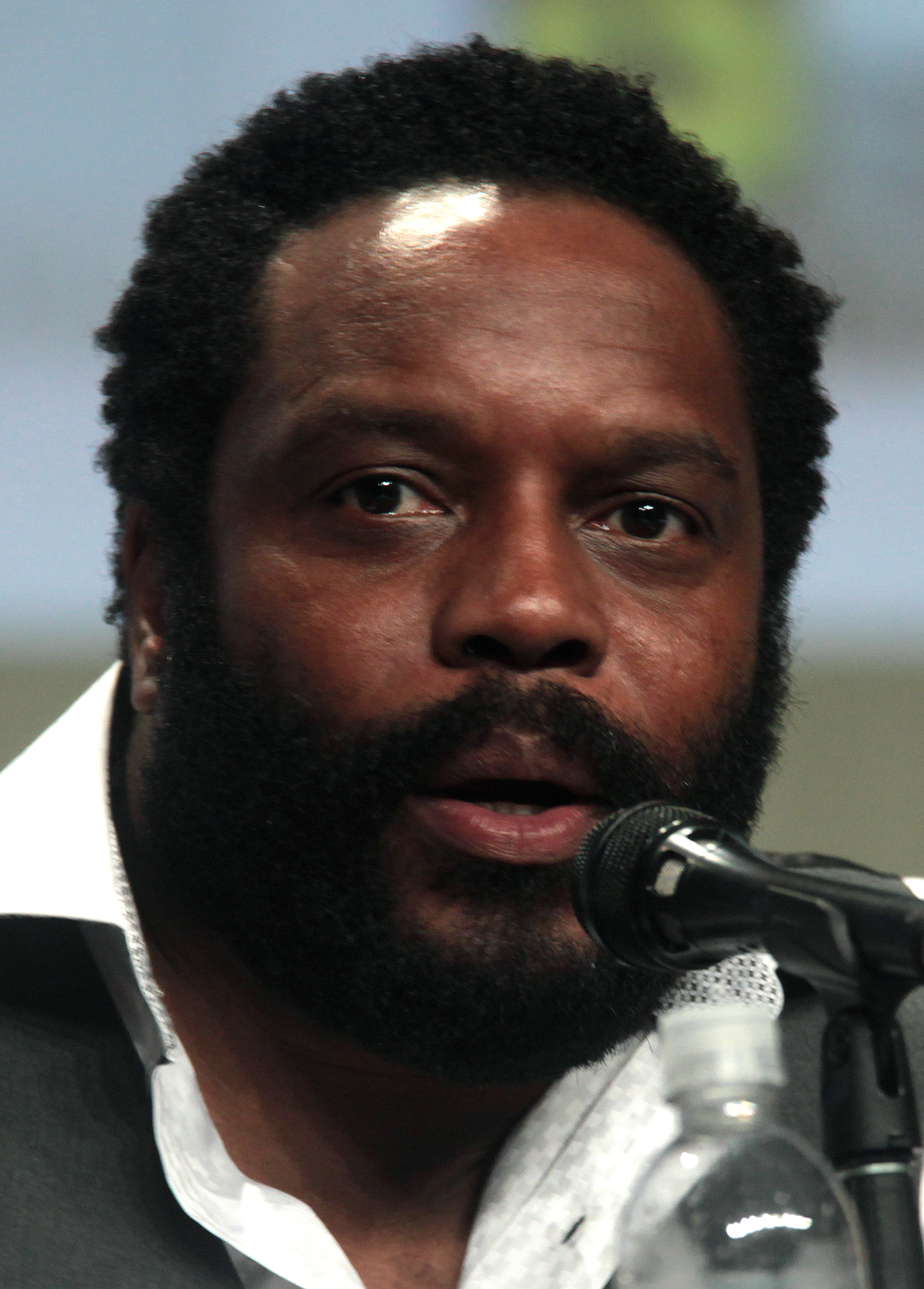
This episode marks the death of Tyreese, portrayed by Chad L. Coleman, whose performance was applauded by critics.

Upon airing, the episode was watched by 15.64 million American viewers with an 18-49 rating of 8.0, an increase in viewership from the previous episode which had 14.81 million viewers and an 18-49 rating of 7.6.

In Australia, it received 79,000 viewers, making it the most-watched broadcast on pay television that night. The British broadcast was the most-watched on the network that month, with 1.16 million viewers.

=== Critical reception ===
The episode received critical acclaim, with many praising the direction of Nicotero, the script of Gimple and the performance by Coleman. On Rotten Tomatoes, it holds a 100% with an average rating of 8.08 out of 10, based on 27 reviews. The critics' consensus reads: "A visually impressive episode of The Walking Dead, 'What Happened and What's Going On' artfully portrays the psychology of the characters, rather than focusing on its shocking moments." It is currently the highest rated episode of the show on the website.

Writing for Forbes, Erik Kain considered it to be the "best episode in years". He said, "It’s all of this attention to detail, whether just a terrific shot of the train tracks or a moment of explosive gore, that make this such a remarkable and memorable episode—an impressive cinematic achievement, and a tremendous hour of television.

IGN's Matt Fowler praised the episode's opening montage, which was revealed as foreshadowing to the end of the episode in a plot twist that the funeral taking place was Tyreese's and not Beth's, calling it a "great little trick". He praised the performance of Coleman, and the direction of Nicotero declaring it "gorgeously directed", the theme of hopelessness within the episode and the hallucinations of the deceased characters. Overall, he gave the episode a 9.0/10.
