= Infected (The Walking Dead) =

- The Walking Dead episode
- The members of the council address the illness that is spreading across the prison.
- Episode no.: Season 4 Episode 2
- Directed by: Guy Ferland
- Written by: Angela Kang
- Cinematography by: Michael Satrazemis
- Editing by: Avi Youavian
- Original air date: October 20, 2013

Guest appearances
- Melissa Ponzio as Karen; Vincent Martella as Patrick; Sunkrish Bala as Dr. Caleb Subramanian; Brighton Sharbino as Lizzie Samuels; Kyla Kenedy as Mika Samuels; Kennedy Brice as Molly; Brandon Carroll as David; Luke Donaldson as Luke; Victor McCay as Ryan Samuels

Episode chronology
← Previous "30 Days Without an Accident"	Next → "Isolation"
- The Walking Dead season 4

"Infected" is the second episode of the fourth season of the post-apocalyptic horror television series The Walking Dead, which aired on AMC on October 20, 2013. The episode was written by Angela Kang and directed by Guy Ferland.

An aggressive virus kills and reanimates many people into walkers, who attack the prison inhabitants. The survivors realize the gravity of the situation, just as walkers attack the prison's exterior, and Rick Grimes (Andrew Lincoln) is confronted with abandoning his quiet lifestyle.

== Plot ==
Late at night, a mysterious figure feeds a rat to the walkers at the prison fence. Back in Cell Block "D", a zombified Patrick enters a cell and kills the man sleeping inside. After Patrick feeds on him, the man reanimates. Michonne goes to hunt for The Governor, while Rick and Carl head out to tend to the pigs. Carl asks if he can help clear the walkers at the fence, but Rick shuts the idea down. Carl apologizes but asks for his gun back. They hear gunshots and see Lizzie and Mika Samuels run out of Cell Block "D", screaming for help. A horde of walkers has attacked from within and killed several people. Michonne, trapped at the prison gates with two walkers, falls over a snare and is nearly overpowered before being rescued by Carl and Maggie.

Inside the cell block, the inhabitants clear out the remaining walkers, among them Patrick. They discover and eliminate another bloody-eyed walker, Charlie, in a locked cell. After finding no bites, scratches or wounds on his corpse, Dr. Caleb Subramanian recognizes the blood pouring out of Charlie's orifices as an indicator of disease, and they link Charlie's sickness with Patrick's similar bleeding. When informed by Rick of the death of Violet the pig and a sick boar discovered in the woods, Hershel notes that, pre-apocalypse, some diseases were spread by pigs and birds. They conclude that everyone in the cell block could be infected by an aggressive strain of the flu. As Carl and Maggie carry Michonne back inside, Rick approaches them and warns them to stay away from him and anyone else who may have been exposed, due to the risk of infection.

Carol tends to Ryan Samuels, who was bitten during the attack. Realizing he is dying, he asks Carol to take care of Lizzie and Mika for him as if they were her own, which Carol promises to do. Lizzie and Mika say goodbye; Lizzie volunteers to stab Ryan in the head to prevent his reanimating but is unable to do so, leaving Carol to do the deed herself.

The council begins quarantining those known to be sick, including Karen and another prison inhabitant, her and Tyreese's friend, David. Carol goes to talk to Mika and Lizzie as they stand by the fence. She bluntly tells Lizzie that she is weak, and in this world she cannot be. Lizzie begins crying that, "They killed him," referring to a walker that she and some other children had nicknamed "Nick". Lizzie runs away and Mika explains that Lizzie is not weak but, "messed up." Beth wraps Michonne's ankle as the two discuss the group's losses. Beth muses about what to call a parent who has lost a child, as there is no word equivalent to "widow" or "orphan"; Michonne begins to tear up but composes herself before Beth notices. Beth later asks Michonne to watch Judith, despite Michonne's reluctance. Left alone with the baby, Michonne breaks down and weeps while holding Judith close.

As the survivors bury the dead, a massive group of walkers converges at a single portion of the fence. Sasha points out the carcasses of several dead rats at the fence, suggesting that someone has been feeding the walkers, which lures them in and causes them to cluster together instead of spreading out. Despite the survivors' efforts to clear them, the walkers' combined mass causes the fence to begin to give way. Rick decides to sacrifice the piglets and uses them to successfully lure the walkers away from the fence. The plan seems to take an emotional toll on Rick. Meanwhile, the prison group is able to secure the fence with tree trunks.

Carol again finds Lizzie and Mika near the fence looking at walkers. Carol warns Lizzie not to identify with the walkers, but instead to take the time to grieve for, and let go of, her father. Lizzie takes her knife (which Carol used to stab Lizzie's father to prevent reanimation) from Carol's hand and puts it in her belt. Carl reveals Carol's weapons teachings to his father, asking that he not confront her. Rick complies. Rick returns Carl's gun and once again begins to carry his own. Tyreese visits Karen's isolated cell with flowers, only to find it empty, with a blood trail that leads outside to Karen and David's dead and burnt bodies outside of Cell Block "B".

== Reception ==
=== Ratings ===
Upon its original airing, "Infected" earned 13.95 million viewers and a 7.1 rating in the adults 18-49 demographic. This was down from last week's series-high 16.11 million viewers.

=== Critical response ===
Zack Handlen, of The A.V. Club, gave the episode a "B" grade, and commented that the virus "as a plot mechanic, it's credible, but not exactly thrilling. There's only so much excitement you can generate from watching nice people turn mean as they die slow." Roth Cornet of IGN scored the episode an 8.5 out of 10, and praised that each character is getting their own storyline, and that the episode "deftly harmonizes the dramatic and horror elements, while propelling the central characters forward in some of the more interesting story arcs on the series to date.
