= Isolation (The Walking Dead) =

- The Walking Dead episode
- Tyreese comes into conflict with Rick over the murders of two infected inmates.
- Episode no.: Season 4 Episode 3
- Directed by: Dan Sackheim
- Written by: Robert Kirkman
- Cinematography by: Michael Satrazemis
- Editing by: Kelley Dixon
- Original air date: October 27, 2013

Guest appearances
- Sunkrish Bala as Dr. Caleb Subramanian; Brighton Sharbino as Lizzie Samuels; Sherry Richards as Jeanette

Episode chronology
← Previous "Infected"	Next → "Indifference"
- The Walking Dead season 4

"Isolation" is the third episode of the fourth season of the post-apocalyptic horror television series The Walking Dead, which aired on AMC on October 27, 2013. The episode was written by Robert Kirkman and directed by Dan Sackheim.

The situation at the prison worsens, as the virus infects more inhabitants, and the survivors try to figure out how to deal with the situation. Meanwhile, the group is confronted with a possible traitor, after Tyreese (Chad L. Coleman) discovers the murder of two infected individuals.

== Plot ==
In the inner courtyard, Tyreese explains to Rick Grimes, Carol Peletier, and Daryl Dixon how he found the burned corpses of his girlfriend Karen and friend David. An enraged Tyreese demands that Rick find the killer; when Rick and Daryl try to calm him down, he turns violent and begins to attack them. During this, Rick flies into a rage and badly beats Tyreese before Daryl pulls Rick off.

After bandaging Rick's hand, Hershel Greene and the rest of the prison's council decide to quarantine those who are sick in Cell Block A and separate the elderly and the children. Tyreese's sister Sasha, Lizzie, Dr. Caleb Subramanian, and Glenn Rhee are among those who contract the virus and are forced to enter quarantine. Hershel suggests that they could search a veterinary college for medical supplies, and Daryl, Michonne, and Bob Stookey volunteer to retrieve the medicine.

Carol notices that they are low on water and informs Rick about it, with the two agreeing to clean the intake strainer the next day. Rick cautiously approaches Tyreese to comfort him and apologize for his actions, but Tyreese is still frustrated with Rick's inaction and walks off. Maggie Greene tearfully reports Glenn's illness to her sister Beth, who assures her sister that they have jobs to do, as their father always says. Hershel, with the help of Carl Grimes, retrieves elderberries to make tea to act as a remedy for the sick. The two encounter two harmless walkers; Hershel advises Carl not to kill them, as it is unnecessary. Tyreese, after guarding the infected survivors from Karen's killer, bids farewell to a sick Sasha and leaves with Daryl's group to get the medicine. He tells Carol, who offers him condolences, to watch over Sasha for him, but after he leaves, Carol breaks down in tears.

Maggie sees her father approaching the quarantined zone, and chastises him about possible exposure, with support from Rick. Hershel counters by saying that they always risk their lives every day: the only thing they can do now is decide what they are risking it for, with his being his ability to save the lives of the infected. Rick investigates the murder scene, and notices a bloody hand print that is smaller than his own hand. While driving to the college, Daryl talks to Michonne about hunting for The Governor when they suddenly hear a voice over the car radio repeating the words "Sanctuary... those who arrive...survive..." A distracted Daryl drives into a horde of walkers, forcing the group to leave their vehicle, except for a morose Tyreese. Tyreese eventually snaps out of it, but is overwhelmed by the walkers, forcing the remaining three to leave him. However, he miraculously survives the swarm and regroups with the others.

Carol has recklessly gone outside the prison fence alone to clear the water pump intake, and Rick saves her from walkers. Rick tells Carol that he has noticed how far she is willing to go to protect the group of survivors. He then asks her if she killed Karen and David. After a brief pause, she responds with a simple "yes," and then walks away silently.

== Reception ==
=== Ratings ===
Upon its original airing, "Isolation" earned 12.924 million viewers and a 6.8 rating in the adults 18-49 demographic. This was down in total viewers and from the 7.1 18-49 rating received for the previous episode's first airing. However, the show still won the night on cable, far outranking any other cable programming.

=== Critical response ===
The episode received mostly positive reviews from critics, with many of them praising the surprising ending and Chad L. Coleman's performance. Writing for IGN, Roth Cornet gave this episode a rating of 8.8/10, indicating that it was "great". Cornet justifies her rating is mainly down to the rich character development seen in this episode, particularly of Carol and Tyreese. She says that "Carol’s choice provides some rich story potential, to say nothing of her character’s now far more complex arc." Cornet explains that the "landscape" has shifted well, adding that many interesting plot lines were extended and raised for this episode, most importantly of the voice heard through the car radio. She writes that she wants to see more of this, explaining that the carrot of hope given to the characters by this mysterious voice, no doubt, will keep the series going. Cornet criticizes the scene in which Darryl, Bob, Michonne, and Tyreese all survive their car's being attacked by a large horde. Cornet says, "it was a bit of a stretch to imagine that all four made it out of that horde intact. Tyreese looked to be in a particular pickle." Also, she notes that the scene in which Carl is told by Hershel not to shoot the clearly weak walkers they are confronted with (one is in a bear trap, the other moving slowly in the woodland) was perhaps not necessary, pointing out that "didn’t Carl learn about leaving walkers behind when Dale died".

Zack Handlen, of The A.V. Club, gave the episode a B+ on a scale graded from A (highest) to F (lowest). Handlen writes against the views of Cornet on the development of Carol and Tyreese somewhat in this episode, explaining that the reveal that Carol killed and burnt David and Karen was "unconvincing" and that "it seems like a drastic leap for the character, and one that a few conversations about knives isn’t going to cover." On the development of Tyreese, Handlen describes his plot line as "clunky in spots." However, Handlen contrasts this point by explaining that though his behavior, particularly his fight scene with Rick at the beginning, is somewhat over the top, it does show us a "sense that frustrated violence must be lurking behind the everyday behavior of so many of these characters." More positively, he writes that the element of isolation involving the quarantined characters was effective, especially when main characters such as Glenn showed signs of the illness. He adds that the chance to see some of the show's main characters step up and try to save others in their hour of need was great to watch, particularly Hershel. Of Hershel's act to go and find some herbs to make tea to help the sick, Handlen remarks: "It’s a small (and potentially fatal) gesture, but the dignity of it, and Hershel’s refusal to back down when everyone else tells him he’s risking his life, is noteworthy. In a way, it’s the exact opposite of Carol’s choice."
