= Internment (The Walking Dead) =

- The Walking Dead episode
- Hershel prepares to save the lives of the quarantined infected inmates.
- Episode no.: Season 4 Episode 5
- Directed by: David Boyd
- Written by: Channing Powell
- Cinematography by: Michael Satrazemis
- Editing by: Avi Youabian
- Original air date: November 10, 2013

Guest appearances
- Sunkrish Bala as Dr. Caleb Subramanian; Brighton Sharbino as Lizzie Samuels; David Morrissey as The Governor; Sherry Richards as Jeanette; Jan Harrelson as Noris; Luke Donaldson as Luke; Erin Hunter as Crying Mom

Episode chronology
← Previous "Indifference"	Next → "Live Bait"
- The Walking Dead season 4

"Internment" is the fifth episode of the fourth season of the post-apocalyptic horror television series The Walking Dead, which aired on AMC on November 10, 2013. The episode was written by Channing Powell and directed by David Boyd.

Multiple threats pressure the prison inhabitants: the increase of walkers outside the prison gates, and the deteriorating conditions of the people infected by the deadly virus. It marks the return of The Governor (David Morrissey), who has been absent since the season three finale, "Welcome to the Tombs."

== Plot ==
Inside the quarantined A Block, conditions continue to worsen for those infected by the deadly virus. Hershel tends to the patients, with the aid of Sasha and Glenn. Hershel starts closing everyone's cell doors, following the advice of the dying Dr. Subramanian, and kills those who succumb to the virus away from the others' view.

Rick returns to the prison and informs Maggie, who had been clearing a large herd of walkers at the fence, about banishing Carol for killing two of their own. After Hershel is told he returns to the cell block, where he discovers an unconscious Sasha, whom he revives, leaving a cell with a female walker open. When the man who Glenn is manually ventilating dies, Glenn attempts to call for help, but he starts choking on his own blood and passes out. Lizzie finds Glenn as the intubated man reanimates as a walker, and calls out for Hershel. This alerts the female walker, who attacks Hershel. Chaos erupts as the walkers proliferate within the cellblock, resulting in casualties to the patients in the block; Hershel kills the zombified Dr. Subramanian to retrieve his weapons to kill the walkers, while Lizzie lures the intubated walker away from Glenn. Rick and Maggie hear gunshots from the prison, and Rick tells Maggie to help her father, while he enlists his son Carl to help with the fence.

Returning to the side of an unconscious Glenn, Hershel realizes he needs the bag valve mask still strapped to the intubated walker, and wrestles it for the bag. Maggie heads to the visitation room, kills the remaining undead and shoots the intubated walker, allowing Hershel to retrieve the bag for Glenn. Outside, the fence gives way and a horde of walkers get in. Rick and Carl arm themselves with assault rifles and gun them down. Right after they finish, the van with Daryl, Michonne, Tyreese, and Bob arrives with the medicine needed for the remaining sick, and Carl reassures his father that they will be all right. Tyreese goes and cradles his sister in his arms, while Bob goes to administer drugs to Glenn. Hershel returns to the cell of Dr. Subramanian, opens his Bible and breaks down into tears for his fallen friend.

The next morning, Michonne loads the walkers' corpses in a truck, and she and Hershel leave the prison to dispose of them. As Rick and Carl tend to their crops, a man is observing the prison from beyond the gates: The Governor.

== Production ==
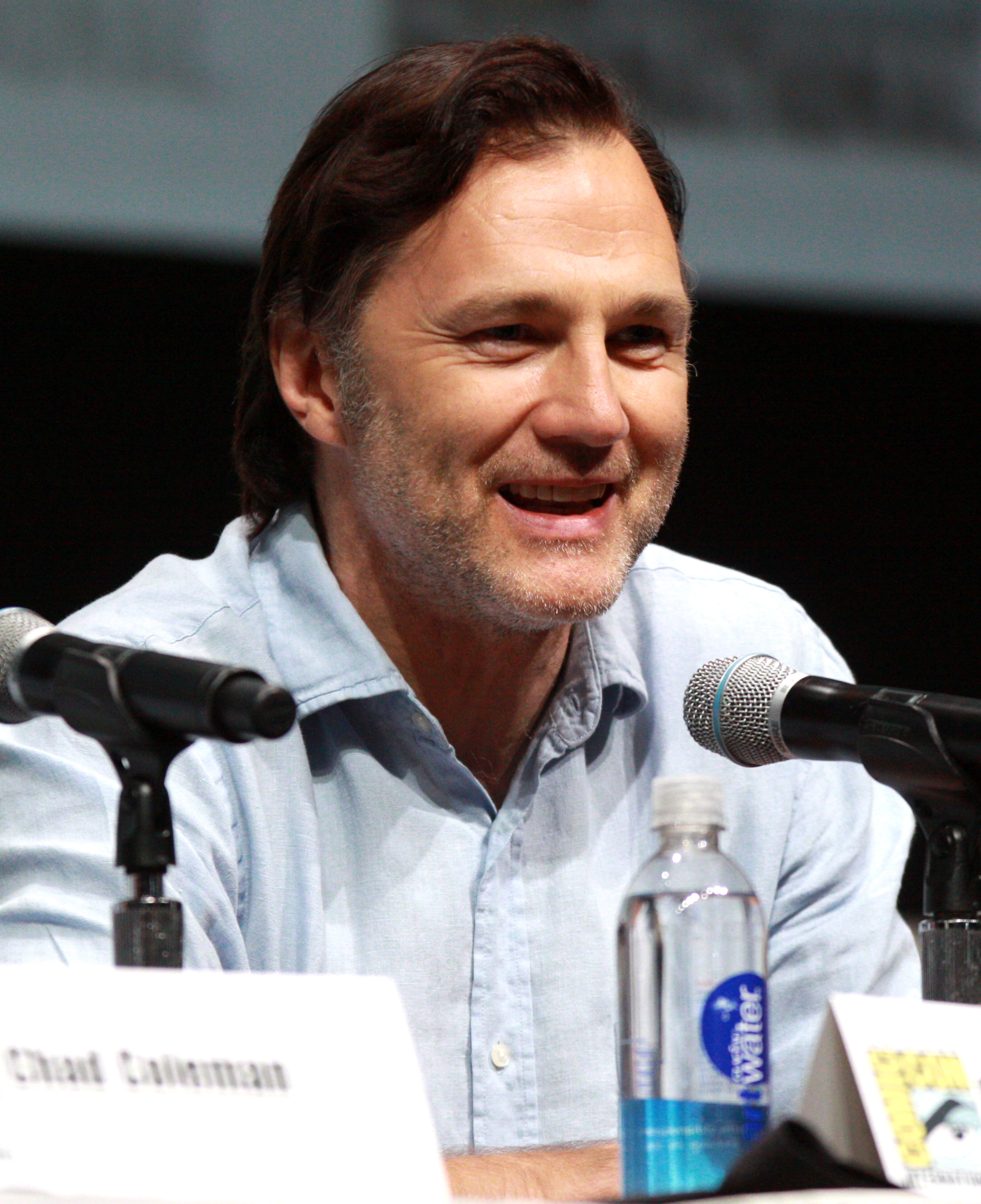
"Internment" marks the return of David Morrissey (pictured in 2013) as The Governor, who was absent since the season 3 finale, "Welcome to the Tombs".

The episode was written by co-producer Channing Powell, her first writing credit for the series after joining the writing staff this season. It was directed by David Boyd, who previously directed the season 3 episode "Arrow on the Doorpost" and served as the director of photography on the series during the first two seasons.

This episode marks the return of The Governor (David Morrissey), who appears at the end of the episode. He was taken out of the opening credits of the episode to keep his return a surprise for the fans. Some critics were impressed with the way The Governor was brought back into the story. Other critics, less so. Hitfix's Alan Sepinwall enjoyed the episode until it "close(d) on the cartoonishly menacing return of the cartoonishly menacing Governor."

== Reception ==
=== Ratings ===
Upon its original airing, "Internment" earned 12.20 million viewers and a 6.2 rating in the adults 18-49 demographic. This was down from last week's 13.31 million viewers, and even with last week's 18-49 demographic rating.

=== Critical response ===
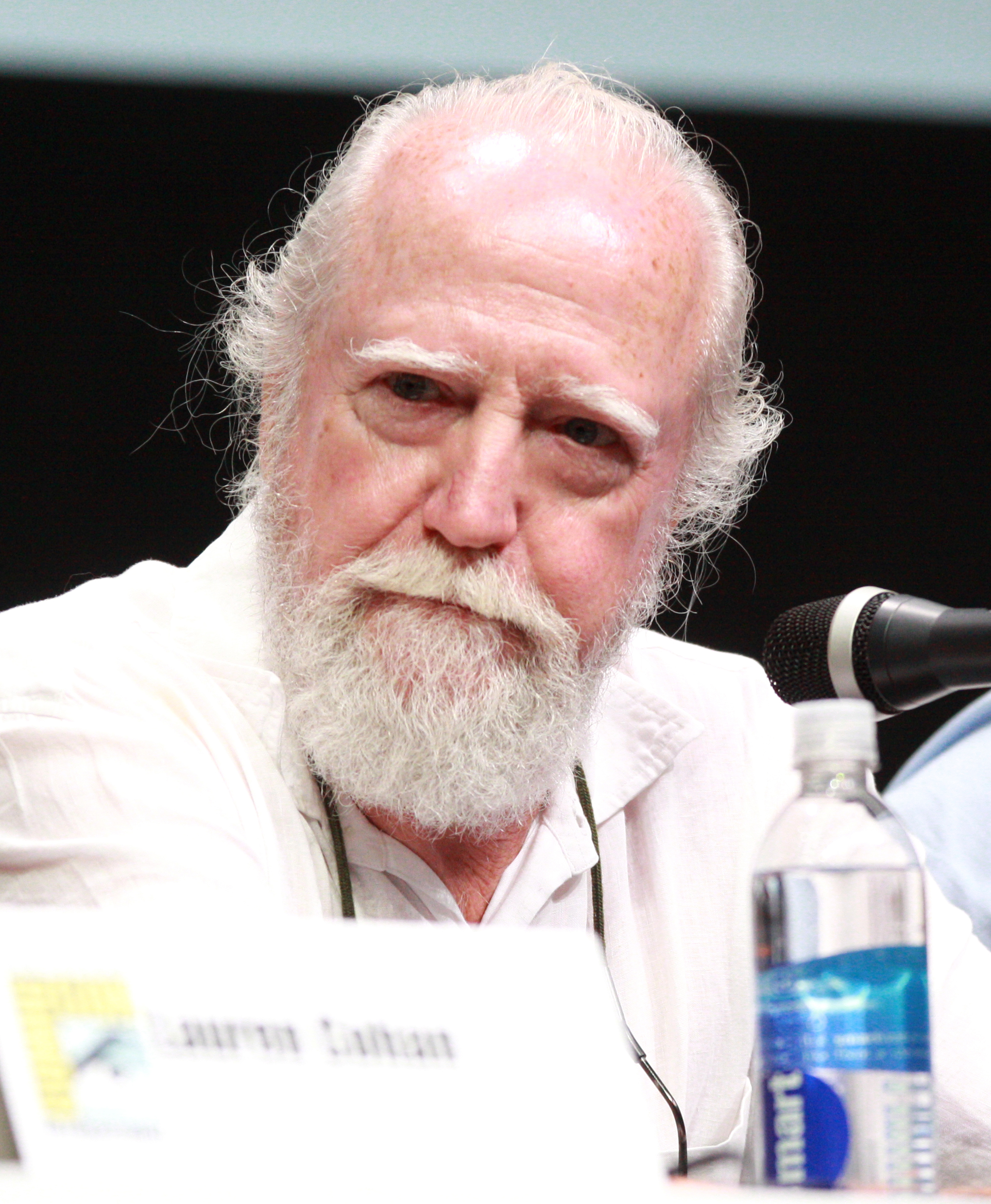
Scott Wilson's performance received high praise from television critics.

The episode was critically acclaimed. Critics praised the action, resolution of the illness, Scott Wilson's performance as Hershel and the ending scene with The Governor's return.

Terri Schwartz of Zap2it called the episode "one of the most stressful episodes of The Walking Dead in Season 4, but also one of its best. With Hershel at the episode's center and the virus at its peak, the stakes were never higher for the survivors at the Prison."

Roth Cornet of IGN gave it a very positive review, scoring it 9 out of 10, stating that it "was filled with some great walker and machine gun action, but ultimately served as a moment to demonstrate the importance of a balanced approach to both leadership and parenting."
