= Lizzie and Mika Samuels =

Fictional siblings from The Walking Dead

- The Walking Dead characters
- Lizzie and Mika, as portrayed by Brighton Sharbino (left) and Kyla Kenedy (right)
- First appearance: "30 Days Without an Accident" (2013)
- Last appearance: "What Happened and What's Going On" (2015)
- Created by: Scott M. Gimple
- Based on: Billy and Ben by: Robert Kirkman; Tony Moore
- Portrayed by: Brighton Sharbino (Lizzie); Kyla Kenedy (Mika)

In-universe information
- Occupation: Assumed grade school students
- Family: Ryan Samuels (father); Carol Peletier (adoptive mother)

Lizzie and Mika Samuels are fictional characters from the fourth and fifth seasons of the AMC television series The Walking Dead portrayed by Brighton Sharbino and Kyla Kenedy, based on The Walking Dead comic book characters Billy and Ben, gender-swapped in-adaptation. Introduced in the fourth season premiere, Lizzie and Mika are two young siblings, and the daughters of Ryan Samuels. Following the death of their father, Carol agrees to raise the girls as her own children. The struggles of Lizzie and Mika are contrasted within the series as Lizzie, capable of taking a human life, is unable to kill walkers, instead believing she can communicate with them and have an emotional connection. Conversely, Lizzie's younger sister, Mika, willingly kills walkers, but her compassion for others prevents her from taking the life of another human being.

Lizzie's psychotic behavior and Mika's innocence are addressed in the second half of the season, with the revelation that Lizzie was feeding rats to the walkers at the prison. During "The Grove" episode, Lizzie murders Mika, and intends to allow her to reanimate. Having found this out, and knowing that she also planned to kill Rick's daughter, Carol made the decision to kill Lizzie. The scene sparked controversy among critics, who continue to refer to it as one of the darkest scenes and episodes of the series.

== Character biography ==
Lizzie and Mika Samuels first appear as recurring characters in season 4, as the daughters of Ryan Samuels, a newcomer at the prison. Their story ended when Mika was stabbed by Lizzie and Carol shot Lizzie in the head to prevent her from continuing her murderous behavior.

=== Season 4 ===
Lizzie and Mika are first seen in the fourth season premiere, "30 Days Without an Accident", with other children who are naming the walkers outside the fence, which leads Carl Grimes to tell Lizzie that they are not people, that they are not pets, and that they eat people, concluding with telling her not to name them. In the episode "Infected", their father is bitten when walkers get loose in the prison, and before dying he asks Carol to look after his daughters. Lizzie expresses intentions to stab his corpse in the head to prevent reanimation but is emotionally unable to. Carol does it instead, and later tells Lizzie she is weak and needs to toughen up. Mika calms down her sister by telling her to "look at the flowers". In the episode "Isolation", Lizzie gets the flu and is forced into quarantine, and Carol is disturbed by Lizzie's apparently personal connection with walkers. In the episode "Indifference", Carol talks to Lizzie before departing with Rick, and Lizzie accidentally calls her "Mom". In the episode "Internment", when some infected residents succumb to the virus and reanimate, Lizzie rescues Glenn from a walker by leading it away. After being treated with medicine, she plays with Glenn's blood. In the mid-season finale episode "Too Far Gone", when the Governor attacks the prison, Lizzie convinces the other children to help in the battle. She and Mika carry Rick's baby daughter Judith and rescue Tyreese from two of the Governor's soldiers – shooting Tara's girlfriend Alisha in the head.

In the episode "Inmates", Lizzie, Mika and Tyreese are shown to have escaped the prison with Judith. Lizzie kills a group of rabbits, and during a walker attack she covers Judith's mouth to try to stop her from crying but nearly smothers the baby. Carol finds the children, and then takes them to Tyreese. In the episode "The Grove", they come to stay at an abandoned farm with a pecan grove. Lizzie shows great distress when walkers are killed and Mika is unwilling to toughen up and become hardened, due to her compassion for others. Lizzie believes that walkers are "just different" and that they want her to "feel the way they feel" rather than kill living humans, but Mika reassures the adults that she is not like her sister, and understands that walkers are dangerous. Carol and Tyreese come back to the farmhouse after gathering food in the woods and they see that Lizzie has stabbed Mika to death and plans to do the same to Judith. Lizzie tells Tyreese and Carol that she has spared Mika's brain so that she will come back as a walker, and asks them – at gunpoint – to leave Mika's body alone. Carol later kills Lizzie after taking her outside to "look at the flowers" to distract and calm her. Tyreese reveals that Lizzie had admitted to being the one at the prison who fed rats to walkers at the fence (as seen in "Infected") and who dissected the rabbit that Tyreese found in the tombs (as seen in "Too Far Gone").

=== Season 5 ===
In the episode "Consumed", Lizzie and Mika's corpses appear in a flashback when Carol and Tyreese are burying them.

In the mid-season premiere "What Happened and What's Going On", Lizzie and Mika appear as hallucinations, along with Beth Greene, Bob Stookey and The Governor, in Tyreese's mind as he is dying from a walker bite. They try to comfort him and assure him he made the right choices and that it is OK to move on while Martin and the Governor taunt him about his actions and their consequences. For a moment Lizzie and Mika hold out their hands, which he holds, but in reality this is Rick holding his arm out so Michonne can amputate it. When Tyreese is bleeding out in the car he sees Lizzie, Mika, Beth and Bob once more; he decides that he wants to let go and join them, and dies peacefully.

=== Season 10 ===
In the third episode of the season, "Ghosts", Carol looks at the cover of a textbook and hallucinates seeing herself at the head of a table with Lizzie, Sophia, Mika, Sam, and Henry with blood over their necks sitting around the table.

== Development and reception ==
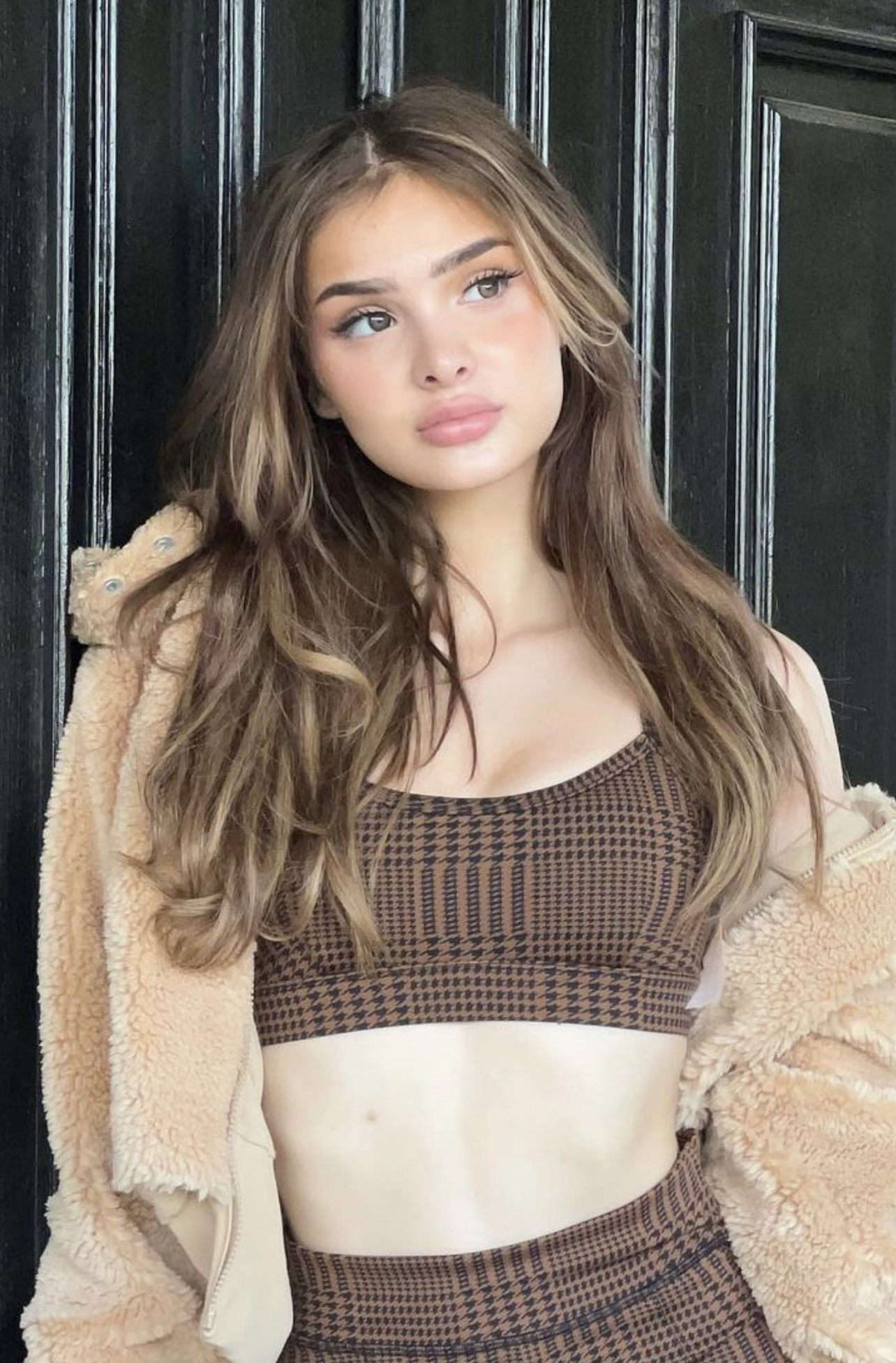
Brighton Sharbino who plays Lizzie (2023)

Marciela Gonzalez of Entertainment Weekly described Lizzie in the episode "Inmates" as "cold and steely" and notes that when walkers approach, "Mika calls out for Lizzie's help, but Lizzie is too busy smothering Judith to death."

On Carol's reasons for having to kill Lizzie and Carol's mindset in the episode "The Grove", Melissa McBride explained:

No, I don't think there was really any other option. There's a lot of nature versus nurture going on in this episode to look at. As much as it broke Carol's heart to have to do this and to realize this had to be done. They were walking toward the flowers in that scene and Lizzie says, "You're mad at me and I'm sorry." You'd think she'd be sorry for stabbing her sister to death, but instead she's sorry for pointing gun at her, so she just doesn't get it. It's not a world that's safe for anyone. The ability to fight isn't a one-size fits all; everybody is different. Thematically, there's a lot said about change. Something I got out of this episode for Carol, too, is that you have to change. The world will change you -- you have to adapt or die. It's about hanging on to that part of yourself: You can change but don't lose yourself. That's what was happening to Carol -- her mindset -- she was so hell-bent on protecting these children that she lost a bit of something, and that was her nurturing aspect. She was missing a lot of stuff because her eyes were so set on survival.

Paul Vigna of the Wall Street Journal commented on the cynicism of the episode "The Grove", saying, "Of all the sick, demented things that have happened in the zombie apocalypse on The Walking Dead, it's hard to imagine any as shocking and sad as seeing insane little Lizzie standing over the sister she just stabbed to death, no concept of what she'd just done, fully expecting her to 'come back.' Carol being forced to kill Lizzie was a close second."

Noel Murray of Rolling Stone ranked Lizzie Samuels 25th in a list of 30 best Walking Dead characters, saying, "no one’s been sickened as much as Brighton Sharbino's Lizzie, an adolescent girl so confused about life and death that she gave walkers names … and then murdered her own sister in order to prove that being undead isn't so bad. More terrifying than any zombie, this kid was a sweet-faced, sharp-fanged rebuke to any hope that the rising generation might make the future brighter."
