= Indifference (The Walking Dead) =

- The Walking Dead episode
- Carol leaving after being banished by Rick.
- Episode no.: Season 4 Episode 4
- Directed by: Tricia Brock
- Written by: Matthew Negrete
- Cinematography by: Michael Satrazemis
- Editing by: Julius Ramsay
- Original air date: November 3, 2013

Guest appearances
- Melissa Ponzio as Karen; Brighton Sharbino as Lizzie Samuels; Robin Lord Taylor as Sam; Brina Palencia as Ana

Episode chronology
← Previous "Isolation"	Next → "Internment"
- The Walking Dead season 4

"Indifference" is the fourth episode of the fourth season of the post-apocalyptic horror television series The Walking Dead, which aired on AMC on November 3, 2013. The episode was written by Matthew Negrete and directed by Tricia Brock.

The episode does not focus on the central location of the prison, and instead, it takes place outside on two supply runs with two separate groups. No scenes are set at the prison, with the exception being the short pre-title introduction. Only six main characters are seen in the entire episode: Rick, Carol, Daryl, Michonne, Bob, and Tyreese. The episode primarily focuses on the relationship between Rick Grimes and Carol Peletier, after the revelation that she has killed two inmates out of mercy, causing Rick to make a difficult decision. Carol and Rick are out on a supply run, while Daryl and the others are trying to collect medical supplies and find a way back to the prison.

The title of the episode refers to how Carol's indifference towards survivors dying and the general situation they are all in, as seen when Ana is being eaten and later commented on how "It was a nice watch" when Sam failed to show up to accompany them to the prison, thus losing Rick's watch that he had on. The episode is seen as a transitional stage for the development of Carol, having become cold and making difficult decisions to survive, ultimately causing Rick to feel unsafe and thus, he exiles her. It also distinguishes the differences between Rick and Carol: Rick stepping down from leadership to take on farming and living a peaceful life, while Carol steps up to make the decisions others are afraid of making.

== Plot ==
After saying goodbye to Lizzie, Carol joins Rick on a supply run, since Daryl’s group has not yet returned. Along the way, Carol defends her actions in killing Karen and David. Arriving in a residential neighborhood, the two discover a surviving couple, Sam (Robin Lord Taylor) and Ana (Brina Palencia), who have been constantly moving to survive. Ana limps from a poorly healed leg injury, and Sam has some slight wounds and a dislocated shoulder. After Carol treats Sam's injuries, Rick asks them the three questions needed to enter the prison. Realizing that they are good people, he accepts them into his group, but warns them about the flu at the prison. He then tells them to stay put until he and Carol return, but Carol urges them to look for supplies against his wishes. Rick relents after the two insist that they want to help, and tells them to meet back at the house in two hours.

Meanwhile, Daryl, Michonne, Bob, and Tyreese find a new car at an auto shop, but the battery is dead. The group encounters a few walkers, but a bitter Tyreese intentionally lets a walker overtake him and pin him to the ground, before being saved by Daryl and Bob. Michonne scolds him about his actions, saying that his anger might get him killed. Tyreese responds by bringing up her continued attempts to find and kill The Governor. While Daryl is hooking up a new battery, Bob confides in him the reasons for his alcoholism. He also confesses that he only joined the team scouting the retail store to find some liquor, and that his actions led to the walker attack that killed Zach. Daryl tells Bob not to be so hard on himself, finishes the repairs on the car, and the group continues on toward the college.

Daryl's group finally arrives at the veterinary college and find the medicine they need. In the process, however, they alert numerous walkers and are forced to flee the building via a ledge. Bob stumbles and his bag is grabbed by some walkers. He refuses to let go and the group manages to pull him and his bag free, only to discover that the bag only contains a bottle of liquor. Daryl picks it up and tells Bob that he will beat him senseless if he catches him taking a drink before their people get the medicine. On the drive back to the prison, Michonne tells Daryl that she will stop looking for The Governor.

While searching the neighborhood, Rick and Carol continue to debate her actions, with Carol still acting indifferent. Later, they see Ana's dead body being eaten by some walkers. They return to the house, but Sam has not returned. As they prepare to leave, Rick tells Carol that she cannot return to the prison because Tyreese would kill her when he finds out. When Carol objects, Rick also says that he does not want her around his family. Rick reassures Carol that she is now more than capable of surviving on her own. He gives her supplies, and the two go their separate ways on tense terms.

== Production ==
The episode was written by co-producer Matthew Negrete, his first writing credit for the series after joining the writing staff this season. It was directed by Tricia Brock, who previously directed the season 3 episode "Clear".

The episode title refers to Carol, who throughout the episode shows an unwavering conviction that she did what she had to do in murdering Karen and David and - at several points – a lack of concern for Sam and Ana.

== Reception ==
=== Ratings ===
Upon its original airing, "Indifference" earned 13.31 million viewers and a 6.8 rating in the adults 18-49 demographic. This was up slightly from last week's 12.92 million viewers, and even with last week's 18-49 demographic rating.

=== Critical response ===
Zack Handlen, of The A.V. Club, gave the episode a B+ on a scale graded from A (highest) to F (lowest), and praises Rick and Carol's story, calling it "the highlight of the hour" and that the episode "does a good job of developing and justifying both characters". Roth Cornet of IGN gave it a very positive review, scoring it 8.8 out of 10, and particularly praised the series' emphasis on character development this season, stating "The Walking Dead continues to deliver provocative episodes with an emphasis on subtle, but profound, emotional shifts and some of the most nuanced character development in this history of this series."
