= Too Far Gone (The Walking Dead) =

- The Walking Dead episode
- A beaten down Rick and his son Carl escape the destroyed prison in the aftermath of the assault that takes the lives of many people.
- Episode no.: Season 4 Episode 8
- Directed by: Ernest Dickerson
- Written by: Seth Hoffman
- Cinematography by: Michael Satrazemis
- Editing by: Avi Youabian
- Original air date: December 1, 2013

Guest appearances
- Audrey Marie Anderson as Lilly Chambler; Kirk Acevedo as Mitch Dolgen; Brighton Sharbino as Lizzie Samuels; Kyla Kenedy as Mika Samuels; Alanna Masterson as Tara Chambler; Meyrick Murphy as Meghan Chambler; Kerry Condon as Clara; Juliana Harkavy as Alisha; Sherry Richards as Jeanette; Luke Donaldson as Luke; Kennedy Brice as Molly

Episode chronology
← Previous "Dead Weight"	Next → "After"
- The Walking Dead season 3

"Too Far Gone" is the eighth episode and mid-season finale of the fourth season of the post-apocalyptic horror television series The Walking Dead, which aired on AMC on December 1, 2013. The episode, written by Seth Hoffman and directed by Ernest Dickerson, shares its title with the thirteenth volume of the comics.

Although the episode itself mirrors the events of the eighth volume of the comic book series, "Made to Suffer," in this episode, the community at the prison is slowly recovering from the illness. Rick (Andrew Lincoln) and the rest of the group at the prison face imminent danger as The Governor (David Morrissey) and his forces suddenly close in. Hershel Greene and Michonne are held captive, as The Governor demands to take hold of the prison, despite the urges of the group to stay.

This episode marks the conclusion to the prison story arc in the television series, as well as the conflict with The Governor, which had begun in the third season.

Commentators lauded the episode, while many particularly praised the climactic ending, deaths, the demolition of the prison and the performances, particularly from Andrew Lincoln, David Morrissey and Scott Wilson. In addition to its positive reviews, the episode also saw a rise in ratings from the previous episode, with 12.05 million viewers watching its original airing. The episode is often considered one of the series' strongest episodes.

== Plot ==
After capturing Michonne and Hershel, The Governor convinces his camp to help him take the prison. Lilly is not convinced, but The Governor reassures her that her family will be safe. While Michonne seethes, The Governor dismisses Hershel's proposal for the two groups to coexist peacefully. He says goodbye to Meghan before leaving her and Lilly near a river bank, where Meghan is attacked and bitten on the left shoulder by a walker buried on the ground.

At the prison, the remaining sick are recuperating. Daryl is upset at Rick for exiling Carol after learning she killed Karen and David, and the two decide to tell Tyreese about her involvement in the murders. Tyreese discovers a dissected rabbit and believes whoever did it was the killer. Rick tells him otherwise, but before he can explain, the three hear a large explosion, signaling The Governor's arrival.

While Daryl formulates an escape plan, The Governor gives Rick an ultimatum to leave the prison or be killed, using Michonne and Hershel as leverage. Rick tries to reason with The Governor, who becomes frustrated and holds Michonne's katana to Hershel's neck. Rick appeals to the militia, claiming that no one is too far gone, and they can still peacefully live together and resolve their differences, echoing Hershel's statements. The Governor calls Rick a liar, and swings Michonne's sword at Hershel's neck, partially decapitating him, prompting Rick and the prison inhabitants to open fire. Michonne, taking advantage of the situation, rolls away and unties herself. A severely wounded Hershel attempts to crawl away, but The Governor catches him and repeatedly strikes him with the sword, severing his head and killing him. Lilly, who witnesses the execution, arrives at the prison with Meghan's body, who had died of her wounds. The Governor takes her in his arms and coldly shoots her in the head. With Meghan dead and his family no longer trusting him, he has no use for the prison, and he orders his militia to run down the fences and kill all the prison inhabitants.

Mitch destroys the fences with his tank, leaving the prison vulnerable, and the militia infiltrates the prison. Rick ambushes The Governor and the two engage in a vicious fight. With the tank blasting holes in the prison, the inhabitants begin boarding the evacuation bus. Maggie takes a sick Glenn aboard the bus, but quickly departs to find Beth, who in turn left to find Judith. Maggie, Sasha, and Bob flee the prison after the bus drives off and Bob is shot through the shoulder. Tara, shaken by the gunfire, runs off. As a large number of walkers stream through the downed fences, Tyreese is cornered by Alisha and another soldier, but both are fatally shot by Lizzie and Mika. The children then run toward the prison, with Tyreese following them, telling them to go the other way. Daryl disables the tank by rolling a grenade down the gun barrel, kills Mitch, and flees the prison with Beth. Though urged to fight by Alisha, Tara refuses as she realizes that what they are doing is wrong.

The Governor nearly strangles Rick to death, but Michonne arrives and stabs the Governor through the chest with her katana, mortally wounding him. Searching for Judith, Rick and Carl find only her empty, bloody baby carrier. Devastated, the pair limp away from the prison. As The Governor lies dying in the field, Lilly approaches, gun drawn, and bitterly executes him.

Carl and Rick walk away from the prison, as hundreds of walkers, among them a reanimated Clara, move into the prison. Rick and Carl escape as Rick says, "Don't look back, Carl. Just keep walking."

== Production ==
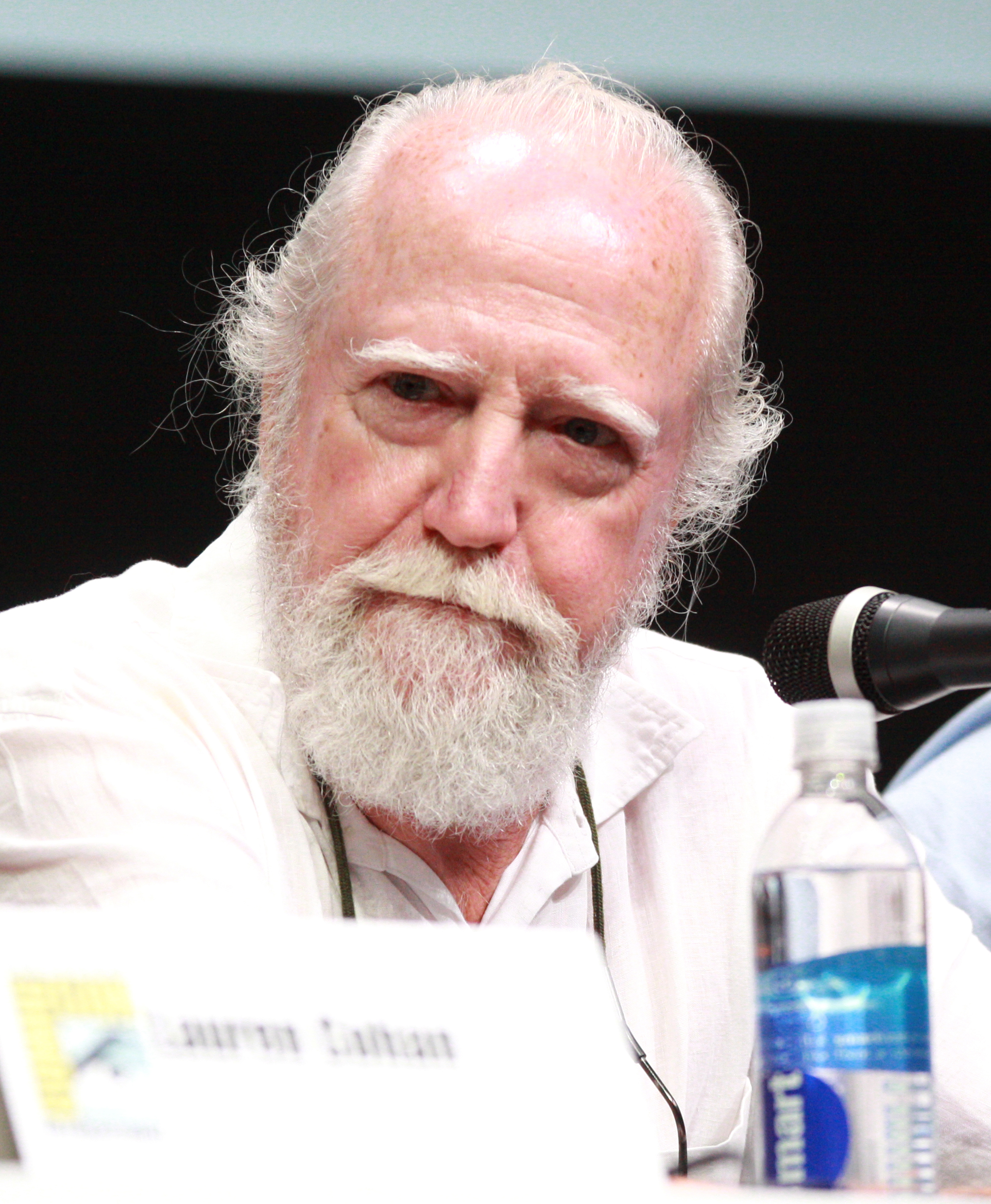
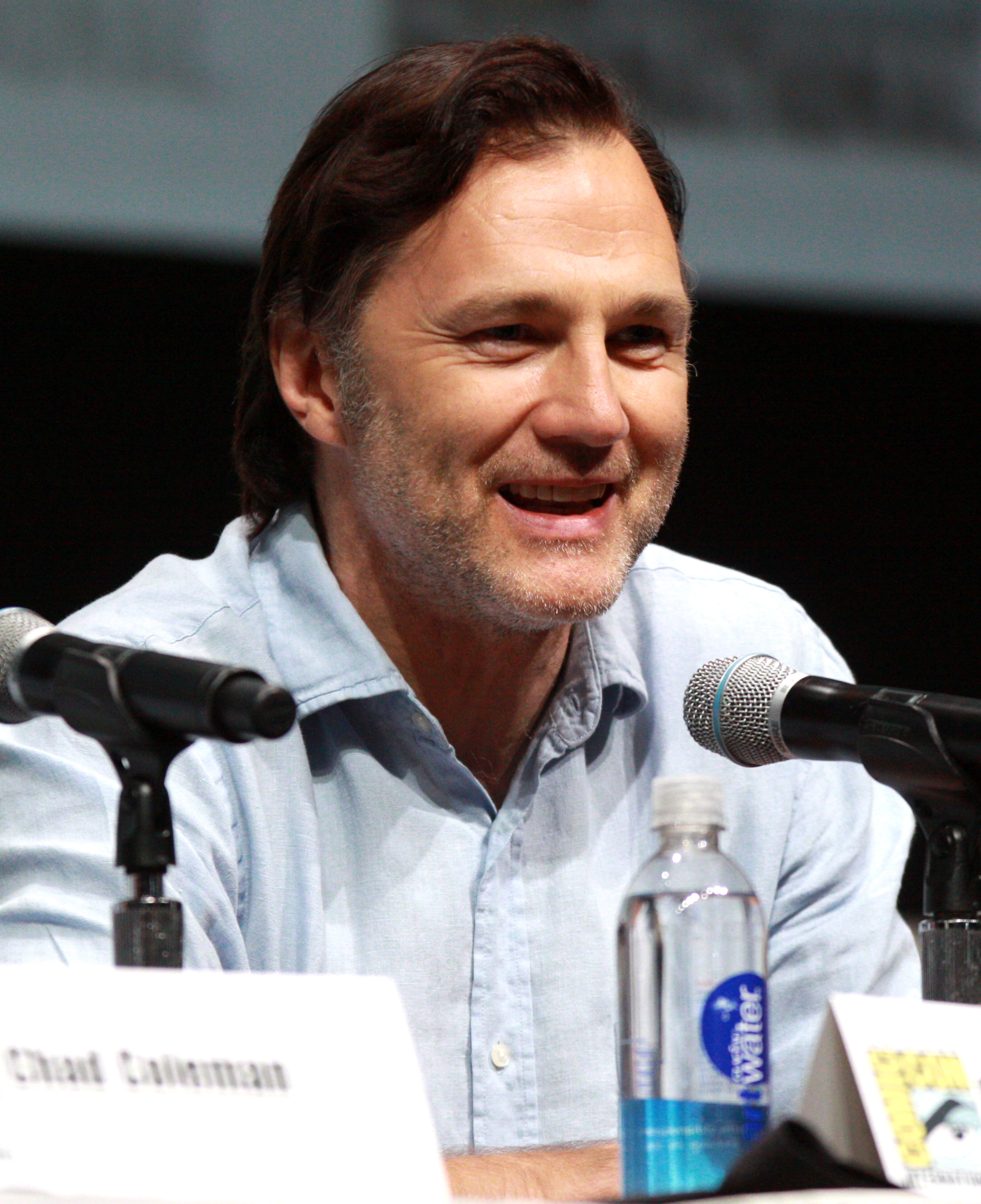
Scott Wilson (left) and David Morrissey (right) made their final regular appearances in "Too Far Gone".

This episode marked the last regular appearances of Scott Wilson (Hershel) and David Morrissey (The Governor), whose characters were killed off during the prison assault in the episode. On the decision to kill Hershel, Robert Kirkman explained:

He was the moral compass of the group and it's always good to lose the moral compass. It will all become clear when we finally show you the back half of season 4. It wasn't enough for these characters to lose the prison. They also had to feel some kind of loss over something important and Hershel was that thing that was important to each and every character, so it made the most sense to take him off the table and see how it affects the characters, which we'll see when we come back in a bit. So there's a lot of cool stuff ahead because of that.

Kirkman admitted it was difficult to remove Wilson from the cast, despite initially planning to kill off Hershel at the end of the second season, but admitted it was a necessary decision in order to move on with the show:

I've been killing people on The Walking Dead since before there was a TV show. It was never a big deal, but it is really starting to wear on me personally. It's tough knowing that I'm going to go to set next year and Scott's not going to be there. That's kind of screwed up. It's getting to the point where I want to be in the writer's room and be like 'You know what, let's not kill anybody. Let's not do that anymore.' It's pretty terrible, but it is what it is. You gotta kill people to make the show work.

During the climax of the episode, The Governor is about to kill Rick Grimes (Andrew Lincoln) when The Governor is mortally wounded by Michonne (Danai Gurira) and later shot in the head by Lilly Chambler (Audrey Marie Anderson), who incidentally also kills him in the comics. Kirkman explained the reason behind Lilly - The Governor's lover, being the one to kill The Governor:

In that moment Lilly is very angry with the Governor because she had in the episode prior said, “Let's not do this. We don't have to go after this other place.” And she was very much against everything that the Governor was doing and to a certain extent didn't even see why he was doing it because she didn't know that burning vengeance that was in the Governor or that desire to control and to have the prison. I think the Governor ultimately hated that there was this group out there that was existing without him and was possibly doing better than him, and it was eating away at him. So I definitely think in that moment when she shot him, she despised him quite a bit. I do think there was a lot of hatred behind that bullet.

== Reception ==
=== Ratings ===
Upon its original airing, "Too Far Gone" garnered 12.051 million viewers and a 6.1 rating in the adults 18-49 demographic. This was up from the previous week's 11.293 million viewers, and up 0.4 share from last week's 18-49 demographic rating.

=== Critical response ===
The episode received critical acclaim upon its airing, with some critics claiming it to be one of the best episodes of the series. Roth Cornet of IGN gave the episode a 9 out of 10, praising the episode for a moving death scene and the battle near the end, and she thought the episode was amazing, but pointed out that the two previous episodes (which covered The Governor's return) were not the best way for the writers to lead up to the mid-season finale. SFX exclaimed, "The Walking Dead at its breathtakingly bruising best, this is the sort of audacious, action-packed television which has you involuntarily gasping, “Wow!” and “Woah!”.

The A.V. Club rated the episode B−, stating, "The Governor looked like a one-season baddie. He wasn't interesting enough to last as a regular character, but he had enough resources and firepower that it made sense it would take a season to deal with him. Instead, it took a season-and-a-half, and the end result isn't a more satisfying finale or a more tragic end." The AV Club went further: "Every happy thought you have will be taken away from you, and you will suffer for it. That's a fine theme for a two-hour movie, or even a novel, but for an on-going series, it leaves us in a story where every ending is always the same. Every situation, sooner or later, will end badly...it's all for the shock value, because that's all the show has."

Alfred Joyner of the International Business Times also gave the episode a positive review, saying the episode "gave us the bloody showdown we've all been waiting for, but the outcome still came as a painful shock. Too Far Gone was a breath-taking mid-season finale, the violent culmination of a season and half's worth of bubbling tension between Rick (Andrew Lincoln) and the Governor (David Morrissey). Like the previous episodes, some moments were far too pronounced (the chess piece on the ground), but in providing us with a heart-breaking farewell to Hershel (Scott Wilson), and a cathartic ending for the Governor, it succeeded on many levels." He also commented on the effectiveness of Hershel's death, saying: "Poor Hershel served as the Ned Stark of the episode (for those who have seen Game of Thrones), the level-headed voice of reason whose attempts to broker a peace between the two parties prove futile. You could say his number was up ever since he heroically nurtured the sick in the prison, but watching his martyrdom at the hands of Michonne's (Danai Gurira) katana still felt like a knife to the gut. The moral compass of the show, him (sic) and Carol are the only two characters who have really grown over the past few episodes, and for this reason his departure was all the more painful."
