= 30 Days Without an Accident =

- The Walking Dead episode
- Daryl, on a supply run, witnesses walkers falling through the decaying ceiling.
- Episode no.: Season 4 Episode 1
- Directed by: Greg Nicotero
- Written by: Scott M. Gimple
- Cinematography by: Michael Satrazemis
- Editing by: Julius Ramsay
- Original air date: October 13, 2013

Guest appearances
- Melissa Ponzio as Karen; Kerry Condon as Clara; Kyle Gallner as Zach; Vincent Martella as Patrick; Sunkrish Bala as Dr. Caleb Subramanian; Brighton Sharbino as Lizzie Samuels; Kyla Kenedy as Mika Samuels; Brandon Carroll as David; Luke Donaldson as Luke; Victor McCay as Ryan Samuels

Episode chronology
← Previous "Welcome to the Tombs"	Next → "Infected"
- The Walking Dead season 4

"30 Days Without an Accident" is the fourth season premiere of the post-apocalyptic horror television series The Walking Dead, which aired on AMC on October 13, 2013. The episode was written by Scott M. Gimple, the series' new showrunner, and directed by Greg Nicotero.

The episode takes place several months after the previous episode, and the expanded survivor group is living an ideal life at the prison before a new threat arises. This episode marks the first appearance of Lawrence Gilliard Jr. as Bob Stookey.

The episode was received positively by critics and was watched by 16.11 million viewers, marking a series high in viewers and adults 18–49.

== Plot ==
Several months have passed, in which the remaining citizens of the nearby overrun town of Woodbury have joined the survivor group at the prison. Rick Grimes, having renounced leadership of the group, has taken to farming to set an example to his son Carl Grimes. While he is walking outside in his garden, he notices several walkers have accumulated outside the prison. Carl approaches him and notices that one of the pigs his father takes care of, "Violet", appears ill. Rick tells Carl to stop naming the pigs since they are food, and admits he does not know why the pig is ill.

Daryl Dixon has increased in popularity among the residents for his role as the group's hunter; Carl's friend, Patrick (Vincent Martella) thanks Daryl for supplying the meat through his hunting. Carol speaks privately with Daryl about the walkers, noting they are not spreading themselves along the fence line as before. Elsewhere, Glenn Rhee tells his wife Maggie that she should not accompany him on the supply run scheduled for later that day. Carl criticizes a group of the prison's children, Lizzie (Brighton Sharbino) and her sister, Mika (Kyla Kenedy), among them, for naming one of the walkers at the fence.

While several survivors kill the accumulated walkers at the fence, Tyreese speaks with Karen, and confides his discomfort with killing walkers along the gate, as it means looking into their faces. Hershel Greene tells Rick that their council – himself, Glenn, Carol, Daryl, and Tyreese's sister, Sasha – prefers that Rick carry a gun when he goes outside the gates, for protection. Rick leaves and encounters Michonne returning to the prison after hunting for an old nemesis known as the Governor, the former leader of Woodbury, and she shares her intention to travel to Macon County to continue her search. She volunteers to check the hunting traps for animals, but Rick decides to go himself. Carol meanwhile secretly uses a storytime session with the prison's children to teach them about the use of weaponry. Patrick, feeling ill, leaves early.

Before leaving on the supply run, Zach (Kyle Gallner) says goodbye to Hershel's younger daughter, Beth, with whom he has formed a relationship. Bob Stookey (Lawrence Gilliard Jr.), a former army medic and a new addition to the group, volunteers to go along to earn his keep; after some hesitation, Sasha allows him to come. The group reaches an abandoned army camp around a grocery store, where they begin to gather supplies. Bob approaches an alcohol aisle in the store and is tempted to take a bottle of wine. He decides to put it back, causing the entire shelf to fall on him. This also attracts the attention of walkers on the roof, who begin to fall through the decaying ceiling. Daryl and Zach are able to free Bob, but Zach is bitten and killed in the process. The rest of the group escapes as a wrecked helicopter falls through the roof, destroying the store and the remaining walkers.

Rick is checking the traps when he encounters a woman named Clara (Kerry Condon), whom he initially mistakes for a walker. She asks if he is with a group and begs him to take her and her husband Eddie in. She leads Rick to her small campsite, where she suddenly moves to attack him. He sidesteps her, and she instead chooses to commit suicide, stabbing herself in the stomach. Clara tells Rick she could not stand living without Eddie, who it is revealed has died and become a walker, and so she took his head with her. She pleads with Rick not to kill her, so she may remain with Eddie as a walker. Rick honors her dying wish and departs, and upon returning to the prison he discovers that Violet, the pig, has died of her illness.

The supply run group returns to the prison. Maggie tells Glenn that she is not pregnant, as they had feared. Daryl informs Beth of Zach's death. She then resets the tally she was keeping of days without accidents. Seeing that Daryl is surprised by her apparent coldness, she tells him that she does not cry anymore, but is glad to have spent time with Zach. Later that night, Patrick rises and stumbles to the showers, where he collapses, dies, and soon reanimates.

== Production ==
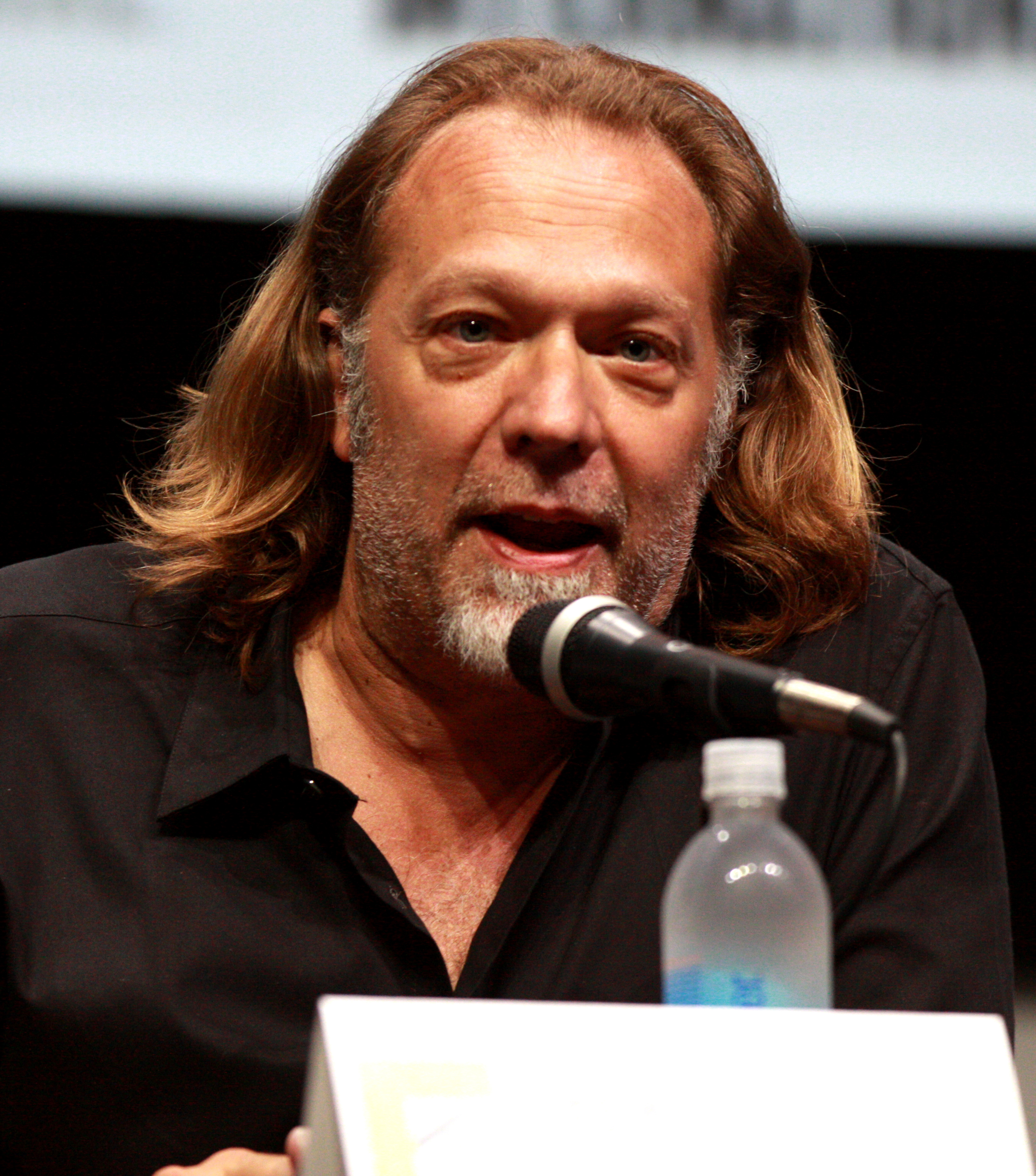
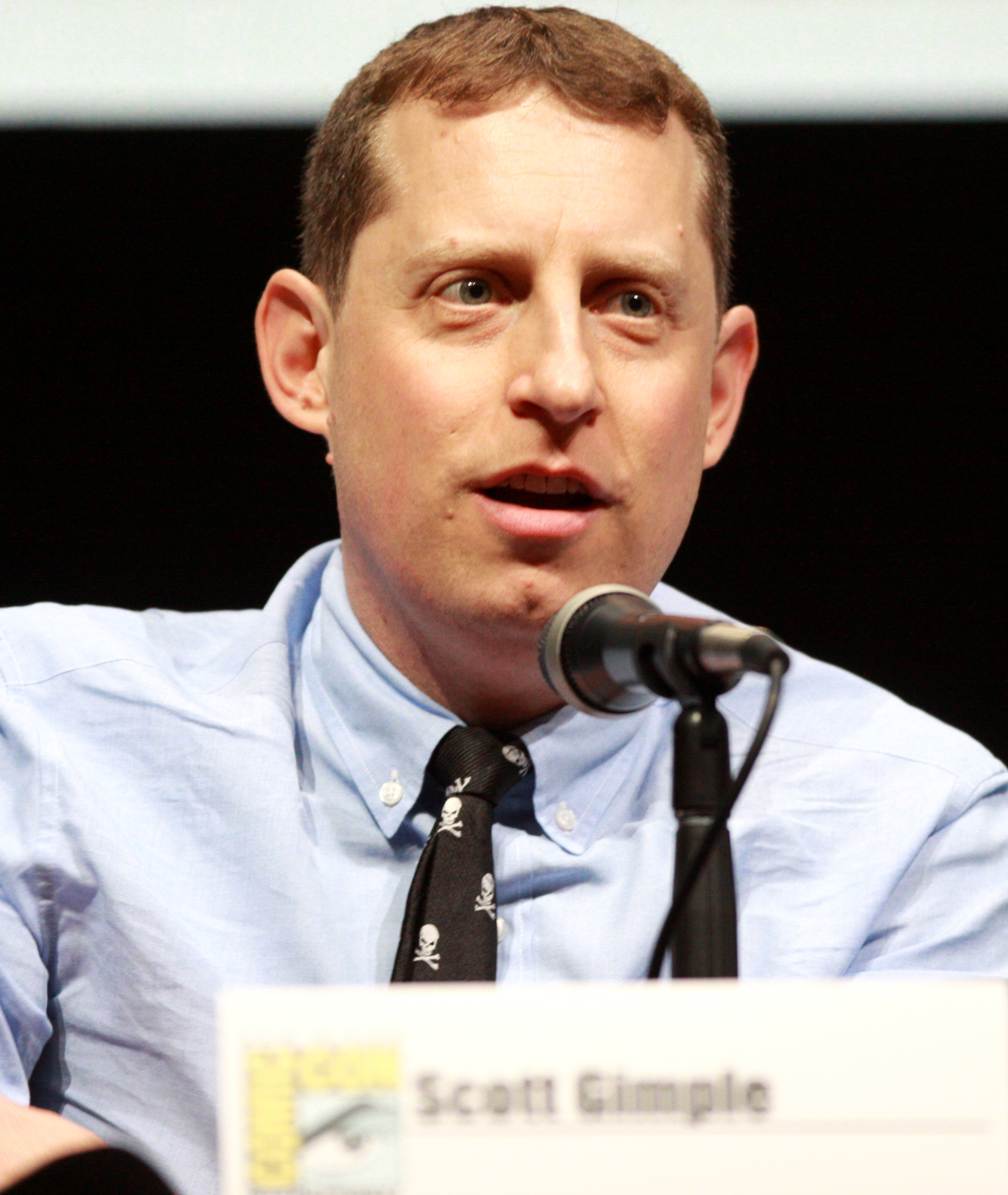
Executive producer Greg Nicotero (left) served as director of "30 Days Without an Accident", which was written by series showrunner and executive producer Scott M. Gimple (right).

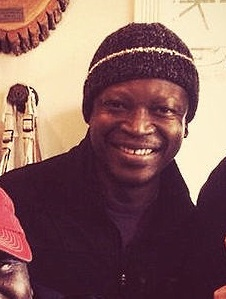
This episode marks the debut of Bob Stookey, portrayed by Lawrence Gilliard Jr.

"30 Days Without an Accident" was written by executive producer and new series showrunner Scott M. Gimple, and directed by executive producer and special make-up effects supervisor Greg Nicotero.

The episode marks the promotion of Emily Kinney, Chad L. Coleman and Sonequa Martin-Green to series regular positions. It also marks the first appearance of comic book series character, Bob Stookey, a former army medic and struggling alcoholic, portrayed by Lawrence Gilliard Jr.

== Reception ==
=== Ratings ===
"30 Days Without an Accident" was viewed by 16.1 million people during its premiere, becoming the highest-rated episode of the series at the time, as well as the highest-rated episode of any basic cable television series. It also drew 10.4 million adults 18–49 viewers, translating to an 8.2 adults 18–49 rating. The episode became the #1 telecast among adults 18-49 this broadcast season including sports. It was surpassed by the season 5 premiere episode, "No Sanctuary", as the highest-rated episode of the series with 17.29 million viewers.

=== Critical response ===
"30 Days Without an Accident" was met with positive reception from critics. IGN's Roth Cornet gave the episode a score of 8.3/10, and wrote "...new showrunner Scott Gimple, who penned the episode, and co-executive producer Greg Nicotero, who directed it, were determined to “come in with a bang,” as promised ...and that is exactly what we got." Writing for The A.V. Club, Zack Handlen scored the episode a "B+".
