= Kyla Kenedy =

American actress (born 2003)

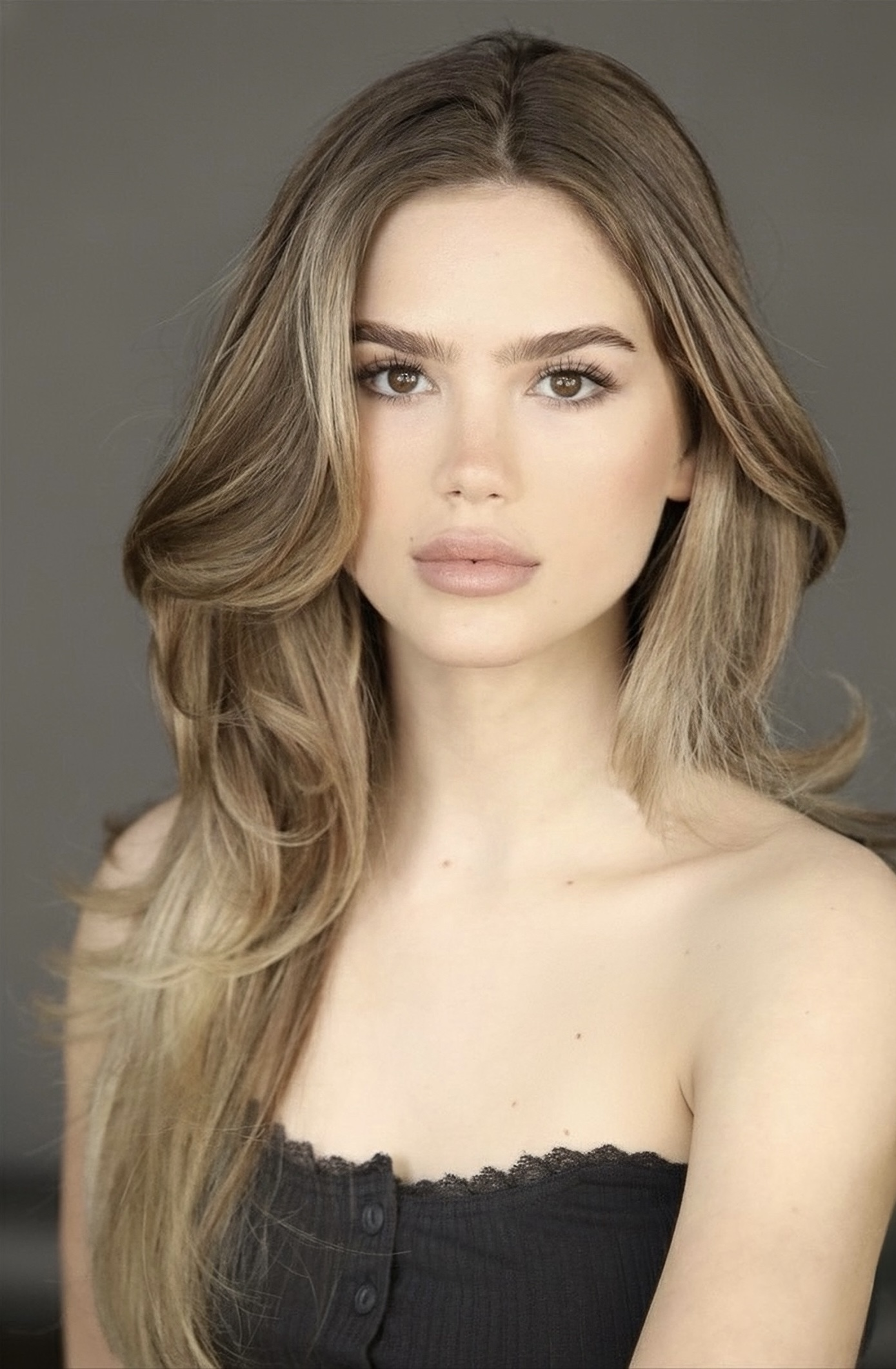
- Born: February 4, 2003 (age 23); Charleston, South Carolina, U.S.
- Occupation: Actress
- Years active: 2011–present

Kyla Kenedy (born February 4, 2003) is an American actress. She is known for her roles as Izzie on the television film Raising Izzie, and Mika Samuels on AMC horror series The Walking Dead. In 2016, she began playing Dylan DiMeo on the ABC sitcom Speechless, which ran for three seasons through 2019. In 2021, Kenedy was cast as Orly Bremer in the NBC sitcom Mr. Mayor. Kyla starred opposite Charlie Gillespie in the 2025 feature film Shattered Ice.

== Filmography ==
Film
Year	Title	Role	Notes	Ref(s)
2011	The Yellow Wallpaper	Sarah Weiland Age 3		
2012	The Three Stooges	Balloon Girl		
2012	Raising Izzie	Izzie	Television film	
2013	Hidden Away	Young Sage	Television film	
2014	Reality	Reality		
2015	A Gift Horse	Amanda		
2016	Love Is All You Need?	Emily Curtis		
2025	Shattered Ice	Kayla Donahue		

Television
Year	Title	Role	Notes	Ref(s)
2011	CSI: Crime Scene Investigation	Fiona Chambliss	1 episode	
2012	Doc McStuffins	Tamara	1 episode	
2012–13	The New Normal	Rebecca	3 episodes	
2013–15	The Walking Dead	Mika Samuels	Season 4 (recurring; 5 episodes); Season 5 (guest; 2 episodes)	
2015–21	If You Give a Mouse a Cookie	Piper	Voice role	
2016–17	The Night Shift	Brianna	8 episodes	
2016–19	Speechless	Dylan DiMeo	Main role	
2019	Chicago Med	Amanda	Episode 5.04 "Infection: Part 2"	
2019	Chicago P.D.	Amanda	Episode 7.04 "Infection: Part 3"	
2021–22	Mr. Mayor	Orly Bremer	Main role	

== Awards and nominations ==
Year	Award	Category	Work	Result	Ref(s)
2013	Young Artist Awards	Best Performance in a TV Movie, Miniseries, Special or Pilot - Leading Young Actress	Raising Izzie	Won	
