= On the Inside (The Walking Dead) =

- The Walking Dead episode
- Episode no.: Season 11; Episode 6
- Directed by: Greg Nicotero
- Written by: Kevin Deiboldt
- Cinematography by: Duane Charles Manwiller
- Editing by: Tiffany Melvin
- Original air date: September 26, 2021
- Running time: 44 minutes

Guest appearances
- Kevin Carroll as Virgil; Ritchie Coster as Pope; Angel Theory as Kelly; Alex Meraz as Brandon Carver; Glenn Stanton as Frost; Okea Eme-Akwari as Elijah; Dikran Tulaine as Mancea; Branton Box as Fisher; Eric LeBlanc as Marcus Powell; Ethan McDowell as Ira Washington

Episode chronology
← Previous "Out of the Ashes"	Next → "Promises Broken"
- The Walking Dead (season 11)

"On the Inside" is the sixth episode of the eleventh season of the post-apocalyptic horror television series The Walking Dead. The 159th episode of the series overall, the episode was directed by executive producer Greg Nicotero and written by Kevin Deiboldt. "On the Inside" was released on the streaming platform AMC+ on September 19, 2021, before airing on AMC on September 26, 2021.

In the episode, Connie (Lauren Ridloff) and Virgil (Kevin Carroll) take shelter in a large house in the woods inhabited by feral humans; Pope (Ritchie Coster) again tests the loyalty of Daryl (Norman Reedus); Maggie (Lauren Cohan), Negan (Jeffrey Dean Morgan), Gabriel (Seth Gilliam) and Elijah (Okea Eme-Akwari) hide at the satellite outpost while the Reapers search through it; and Kelly (Angel Theory) looks for her sister, Connie. The episode received critical acclaim for its horror factor.

== Plot ==
Connie and Virgil shelter in a house they find in the woods while on the run from walkers, while in another forested area Kelly searches for Connie. Daryl remains at the Reapers' hideout, where he witnesses Carver interrogate Frost. Pope tasks Daryl with continuing the interrogation. Frost reveals that they're meeting up at a yellow house when Daryl cuts one of his fingers off, and Leah agrees to lead a team to investigate the house. Leah asks Daryl to come with them, which upsets Carver.

At the house, while checking to see if it's clear, Connie spots eyes looking back at her through the bathroom medicine cabinet. She takes Virgil to the bathroom, but the eyes are gone. As they walk back to the main room, a moving wall closes between them, trapping them in different rooms. Connie is attacked by a creature and escapes; Virgil is also attacked but manages to stab the creature. They quickly discover that these creatures are not walkers, but are actually living people who have gone completely feral.

Kelly comes across a camp in the woods that Connie stayed at with Virgil, finding a small journal Connie was keeping. She is eventually joined by Carol, Rosita, and Magna, who are annoyed that Kelly didn't tell anyone where she was going before she left, but agree to help her look for Connie.

When Leah's search party arrives at the yellow house, Daryl covertly signals Maggie, Negan, Gabriel, and Elijah, who hide in a compartment in the floor to avoid the Reapers. The Reapers search until they come upon Maggie's house. Finding it empty, Daryl suggests they could have escaped out the back, but Carver is suspicious. He questions if Daryl is loyal to the Reapers, but Leah suggests they check the remaining houses. Carver finds the hidden door but upon lifting up the carpet, it is empty.

After the two are reunited, Virgil tells Connie to leave him, but she insists that she's not leaving, and he agrees to go with her. They run out of the room with and are ambushed by the feral people. While fighting, Virgil is stabbed repeatedly. Connie hides Virgil behind her and covers herself in guts from a walker, before letting the walkers in to devour the ferals. Connie and Virgil are attacked again outside, but the ferals are killed by slingshot. Kelly, Carol, Rosita, and Magna run over to Connie, as the two sisters embrace.

After checking all the buildings, Leah's group arrive back at Meridian and tell Pope that they didn't find anyone. They see the zombified Frost tied to a pole, and Pope says that he got everything he needed out of Frost, before bringing Carver inside Meridian.

== Reception ==
=== Critical reception ===
The episode received critical acclaim and is the best-reviewed episode of season 11 so far. On review aggregator site Rotten Tomatoes, "On the Inside" has a score of 100% with an average score of 8.9 across 13 reviews. The critical consensus reads: "While the Reapers have yet to coalesce into a memorable threat, 'On the Inside' enthralls with a horror house set piece that will terrify even the most hardened Walking Dead fans."

Writing for Forbes, Erik Kain praised the episode's tone and story, writing that it was "the scariest Walking Dead episode in a very long time, calling to mind classic horror films like The People Under The Stairs." Kain later reflected that the episode "was completely implausible and ridiculous, but had such a fun horror movie vibe". Ron Hogan for Den of Geek also compared the episode positively to The People Under The Stairs, giving the episode 4.5 out of 5 stars. Hogan praised Nicotero's direction, the writing, and the themes of horror, calling it "the most jaw-clenching, teeth grinding episodes of straight-out horror that The Walking Dead has done." Alex McLevy for The A.V. Club rated the episode a B+, calling it "one of the scariest installments of the AMC series in years."

Rob Bricken from Gizmodo referred to it as "unintentionally funny", noting its use of horror tropes as being effective at creating tension prior to the reveal of "the Pack", but that the tension falls flat after the reveal.

=== Ratings ===
The episode was seen by 1.78 million viewers in the United States on its original air date. It marked a decrease in ratings from the previous episode, which had 1.91 million viewers.
