= No Other Way (The Walking Dead) =

- The Walking Dead episode
- Episode no.: Season 11; Episode 9
- Directed by: Jon Amiel
- Written by: Corey Reed
- Cinematography by: Duane Charles Manwiller
- Editing by: Jack Colwell
- Original air date: February 20, 2022
- Running time: 41 minutes

Guest appearances
- Angel Theory as Kelly; Alex Meraz as Brandon Carver; Okea Eme-Akwari as Elijah; Kerry Cahill as Dianne; Branton Box as Fisher; Dikran Tulaine as Mancea; Mandi Christine Kerr as Barbara; Anabelle Holloway as Gracie; Antony Azor as R.J. Grimes; Kien Michael Spiller as Hershel Rhee; Ethan McDowell as Ira Washington; Zac Zedalis as Boone; Lex Lauletta as Austin

Episode chronology
← Previous "For Blood"	Next → "New Haunts"
- The Walking Dead (season 11)

"No Other Way" is the ninth episode and second-part premiere of the eleventh season of the post-apocalyptic horror television series The Walking Dead. The 162nd episode of the series overall, the episode was directed by Jon Amiel and written by Corey Reed. "No Other Way" premiered on AMC on February 20, 2022.

In the episode, Daryl (Norman Reedus), Maggie (Lauren Cohan), Gabriel (Seth Gilliam) and Negan (Jeffrey Dean Morgan) fight against the Reapers for food.

Aaron (Ross Marquand) and the Alexandrians try to survive a storm as the walls cave in and the walkers invade the community. This episode marks the final appearances of Alden (Callan McAuliffe). The episode receives positive reviews from critics.

== Plot ==
In Meridian, Leah (Lynn Collins) fires the hwacha at the walkers as they flood the complex. A Reaper attacks Maggie (Lauren Cohan), but is shot by an arrow. Maggie hides in a building and meets with Negan (Jeffrey Dean Morgan) and Elijah (Okea Eme-Akwari), who has been injured by shrapnel. She takes them to the infirmary, where they hide in a secret room. Carver (Alex Meraz) searches for them and receives a radio order from Leah to kill everyone he finds.

Back in Alexandria, Rosita (Christian Serratos) and others fight walkers outside Aaron (Ross Marquand) house. Judith (Cailey Fleming) and Gracie (Anabelle Holloway) try to escape the basement, which is quickly flooding with water. Gracie blows the whistle as the basement fills with water. A walker attacks Judith and Gracie. Aaron breaks the basement window, jumps in and starts killing the walkers.

Gabriel (Seth Gilliam) finds Mancea (Dikran Tulaine) and draws his sword. Mancea predicts that Gabriel will not kill him, since he did not kill him in the cemetery. Gabriel is surprised to learn that Mancea knew about his presence in the cemetery. Mancea asks if Gabriel listens to God more and asks Gabriel to renew his faith; Gabriel hears a noise behind the door and stabs Mancea in the stomach. Carver chases Maggie down a hallway. Negan and Elijah ambush him, but Carver injures Elijah and knocks Maggie to the ground; however, Negan knocks Carver out with a bell. Daryl (Norman Reedus) intervenes and insists that they use Carver as leverage, despite Elijah's promise to avenge his sister; Daryl calls Leah and proposes that they talk.

After hearing Gracie's whistle, Rosita sends Lydia (Cassady McClincy) to investigate while she fights off the walkers surrounding the house. Daryl, Maggie, Negan and Elijah meet up with Leah and the rest of the Reapers. Daryl offers to free Carver if the Reapers leave Meridian, but promises to kill them if they return. Leah rejects his offer and reveals that a sniper will kill them if they don't free Carver. Daryl reluctantly lets Carver go. Gabriel shoots Carver in the leg and informs Leah via walkie that he killed her shooter. Leah accepts Daryl's terms and begins leaving along with two Reapers. After Elijah tells her that his people need to be avenged, Maggie kills the remaining Reapers and shoots Leah in the shoulder, letting her escape. Daryl later tracks Leah down and asks her to leave, threatening to kill her.

Maggie enters the church; putting down a reanimated Reaper, she discovers that Alden (Callan McAuliffe) was killed by the man during a fight, having his legs broken and his throat slit. After sadly putting her friend out of his misery, Maggie buries Alden in the woods. Negan joins her and thinks she always planned to kill the Reapers, despite Daryl's attempted negotiation. Worried that she will do the same to him, he decides to separate himself from the group. Maggie joins Daryl and Gabriel at a campfire. She reports that Alden is dead and that Negan is gone. Daryl's group returns to Alexandria.

A caravan of Commonwealth soldiers approaches the gate of Alexandria. Eugene (Josh McDermitt) tells the residents of Alexandria that soldiers have come to help. Commonwealth soldiers unload supplies in Alexandria. Eugene introduces Hornsby (Josh Hamilton) to the community. Hornsby shares his admiration for what they have built and offers to provide labor and materials to help them rebuild. He also offers another option for those interested.

Six months later, Maggie and Elijah are at the guard post at Hilltop. Hornsby waits outside the gates with a group of Commonwealth soldiers. One of the soldiers approaches Maggie and demands that she open up. Maggie says it doesn't have to be like this; the soldier takes off his helmet and reveals himself to be Daryl.

== Production ==
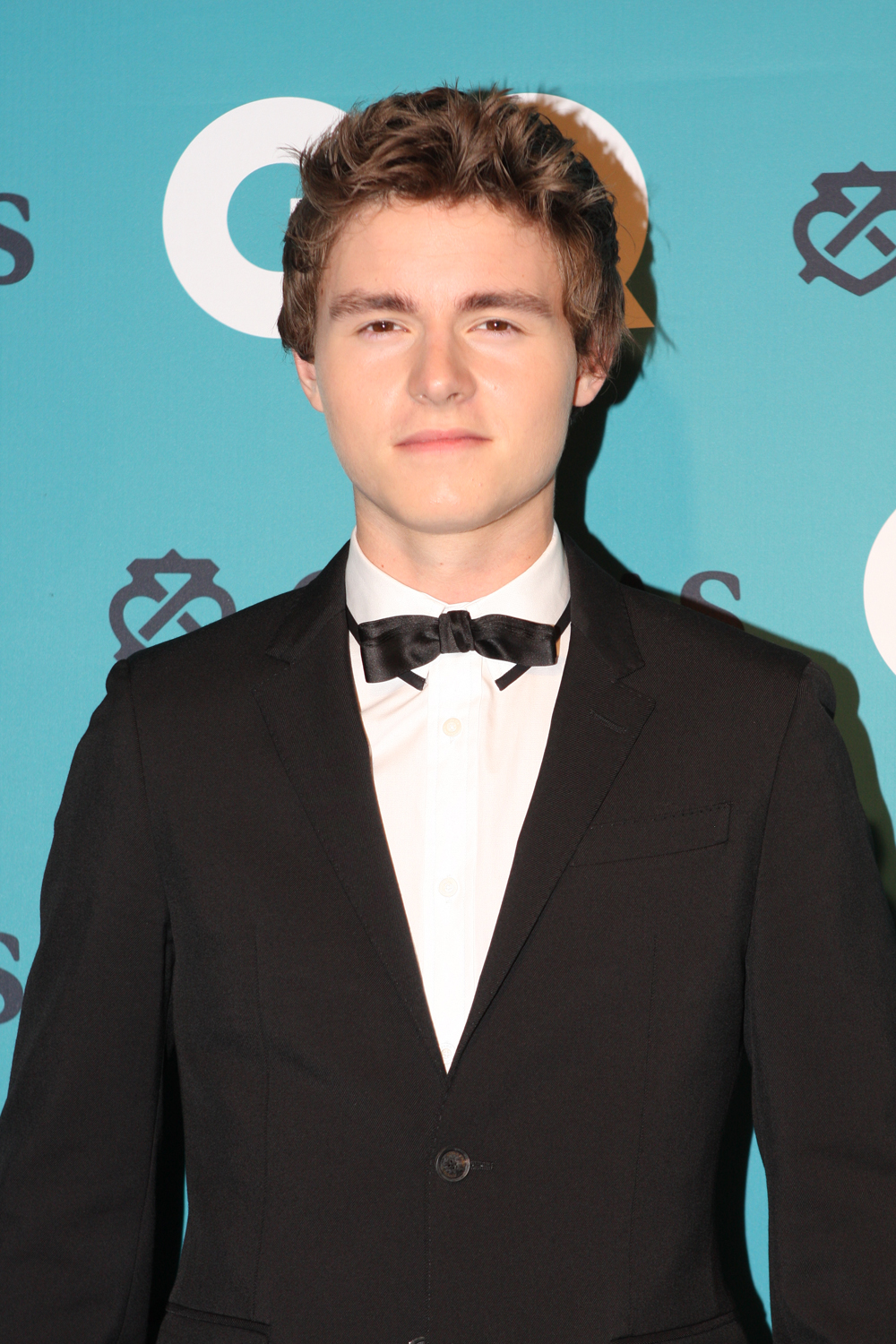
The episode marks the last appearance of Alden, played by Callan McAuliffe.

"No Other Way" marks the last appearance of Alden (Callan McAuliffe). Alden was a recurring character in the eighth season and became part of the regular cast in season 9.

== Reception ==
=== Critical reception ===
The episode received positive reviews. On review aggregator website Rotten Tomatoes, "No Other Way" has a score of 100%, with an average score of 8.40 across 11 reviews. The critical consensus reads: "The Reaper threat is extinguished in "No Other Way," a thrilling return that takes The Walking Dead's final season in a more promising direction."

Erik Kain for Forbes praised the episode, writing that: "A tense conclusion to the Reapers storyline, a great twist, and one of the best scenes in the entire show’s run all conspire to make this one of The Walking Dead’s best." Paul Daily of TV Fanatic gave it a score of 4.5/5 and praised the episode writing: "It was time to weave some of the plots together to truly give the sense that The Walking Dead Season 11 is the final season, and damn, it was a nail-biting premiere that changed the trajectory of the series." Alex McLevy for The A.V. Club rated the episode a B, calling it "Well! That was a lot."

=== Ratings ===
The episode has a total of 1.76 million viewers in its original airing on AMC.
