= The Walking Dead season 11 =

Season of television series

The Walking Dead
- Season 11
- Promotional poster art featuring characters Negan, Maggie Greene, Daryl Dixon, Carol Peletier and Mercer
- Showrunner: Angela Kang
- Starring: Norman Reedus; Melissa McBride; Lauren Cohan; Christian Serratos; Josh McDermitt; Seth Gilliam; Ross Marquand; Khary Payton; Cooper Andrews; Callan McAuliffe; Jeffrey Dean Morgan; Eleanor Matsuura; Lauren Ridloff; Cailey Fleming; Nadia Hilker; Cassady McClincy; Angel Theory; Paola Lázaro; Michael James Shaw; Josh Hamilton; Laila Robins; Lynn Collins; Margot Bingham
- No. of episodes: 24

Release
- Original network: AMC
- Original release: August 22, 2021 – November 20, 2022

Season chronology
- ← Previous; Season 10

The eleventh and final season of The Walking Dead, an American post-apocalyptic horror television series on AMC, premiered on August 22, 2021, and concluded on November 20, 2022, consisting of 24 episodes. Developed for television by Frank Darabont, the series is based on the eponymous series of comic books by Robert Kirkman, Tony Moore, and Charlie Adlard. The executive producers are Kirkman, David Alpert, Scott M. Gimple, Angela Kang, Greg Nicotero, Joseph Incaprera, Denise Huth, and Gale Anne Hurd, with Kang as showrunner for her third and final season. The eleventh season has received positive reviews by critics.

This season adapts material from issues #175–193 of the comic book series and focuses on the group's encounter with the Commonwealth, a large network of communities that has advanced equipment and over fifty thousand survivors living in their settlements. Additionally, the season also focuses on the group's confrontation with the Reapers, a mysterious faction of hostile survivors that attacked and took Meridian, the former home of Maggie (Lauren Cohan) and her new people, the Wardens.

== Cast ==
=== Main cast ===
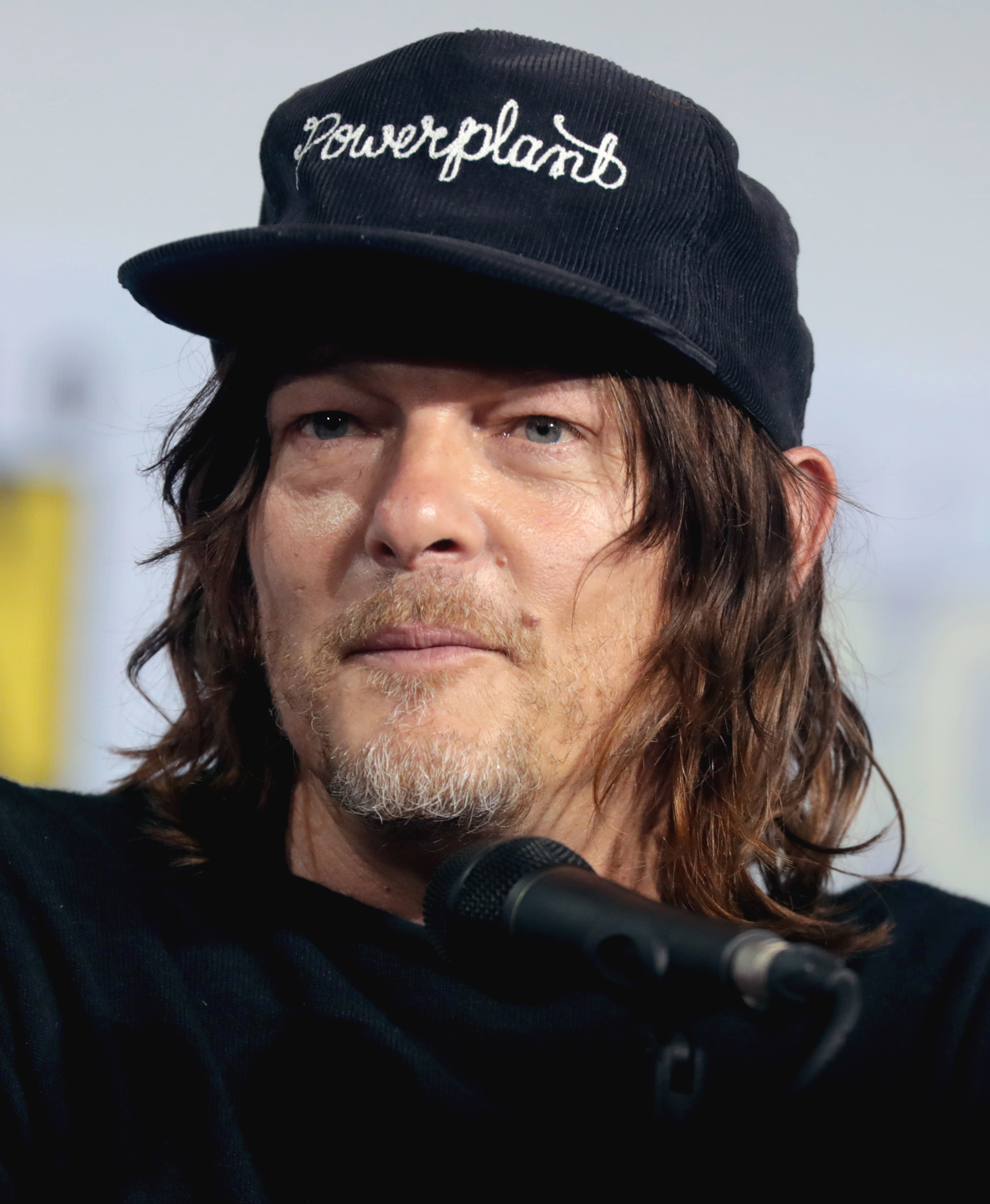
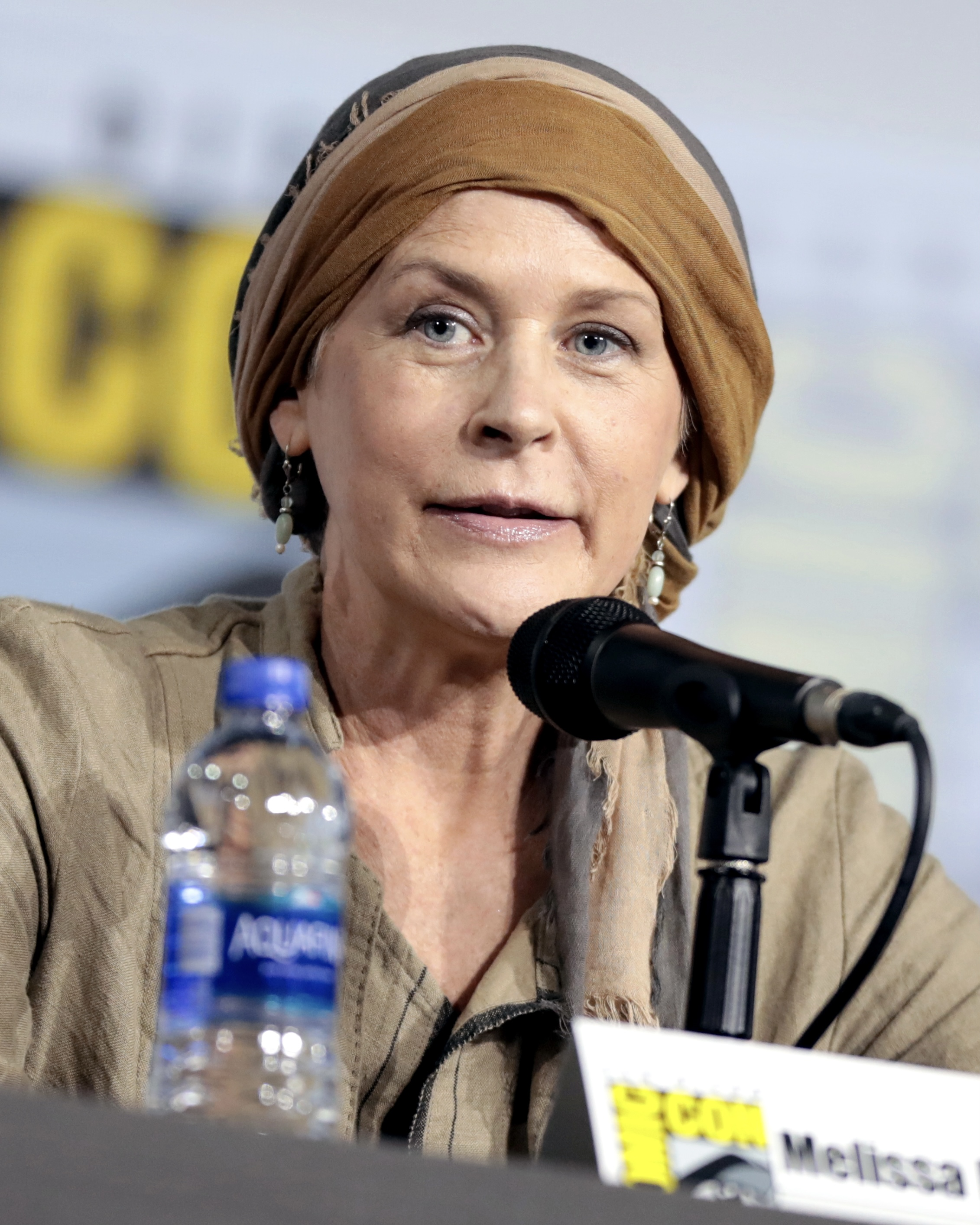
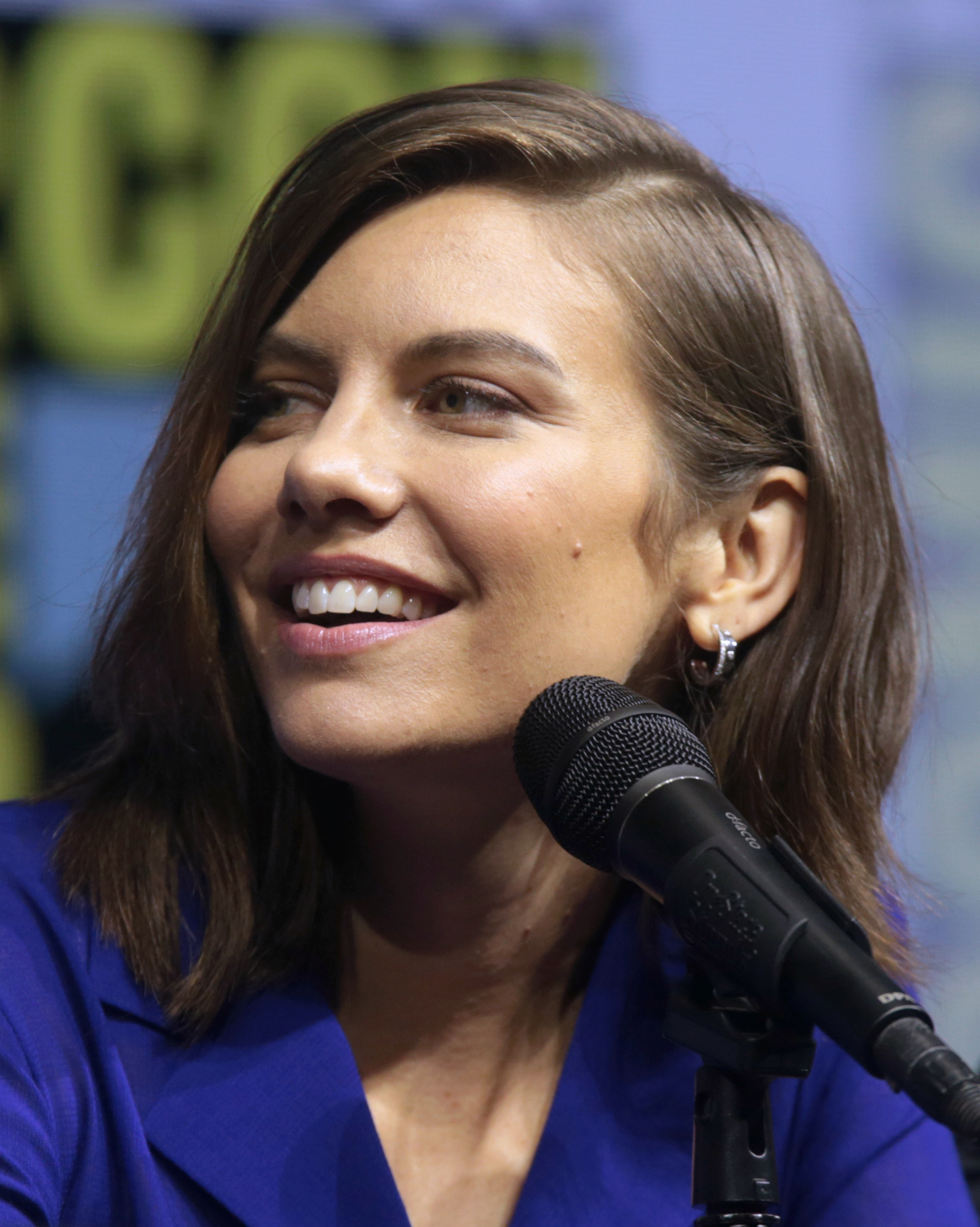
Norman Reedus (Daryl Dixon), Melissa McBride (Carol Peletier), and Lauren Cohan (Maggie Greene)
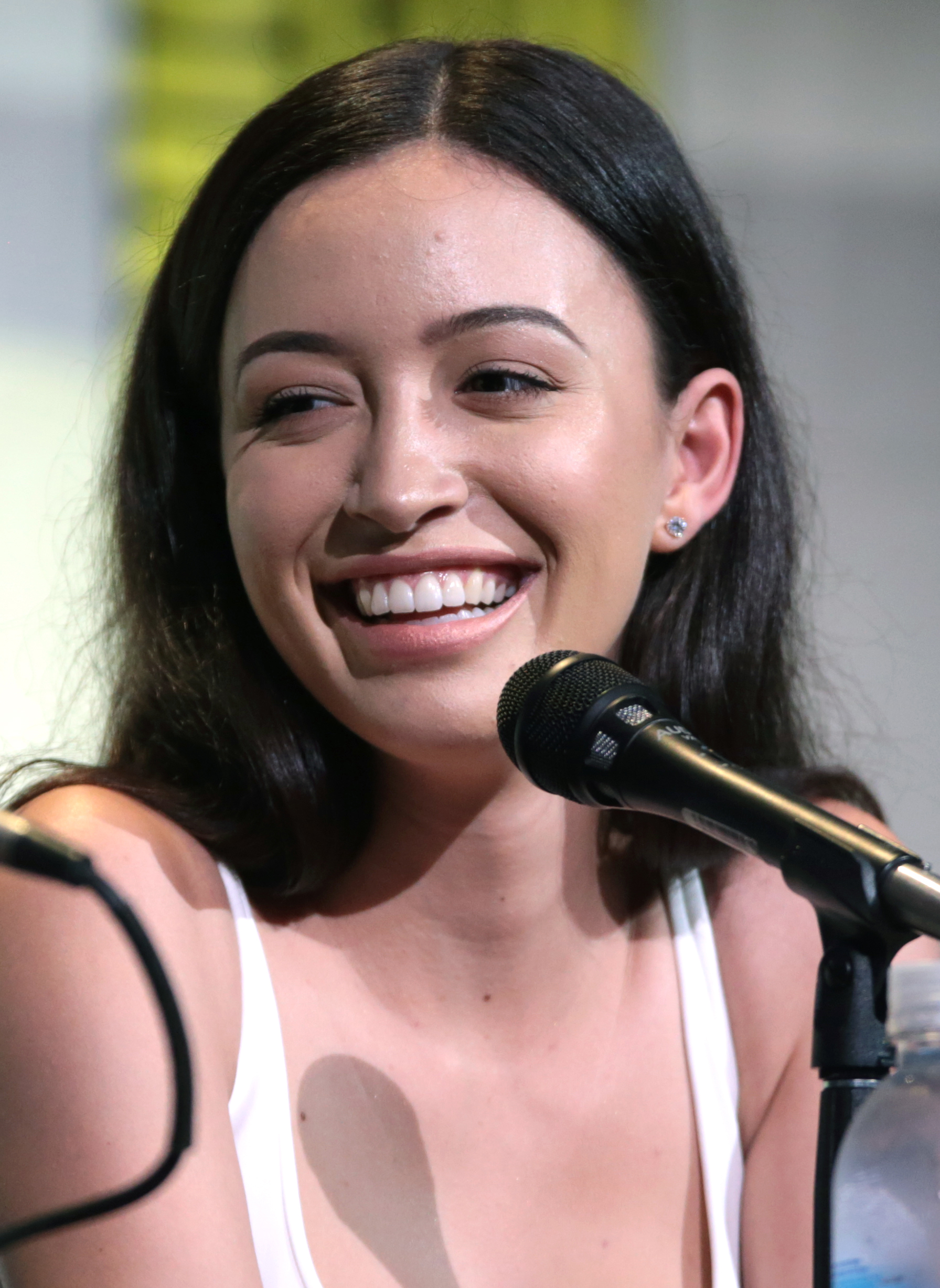
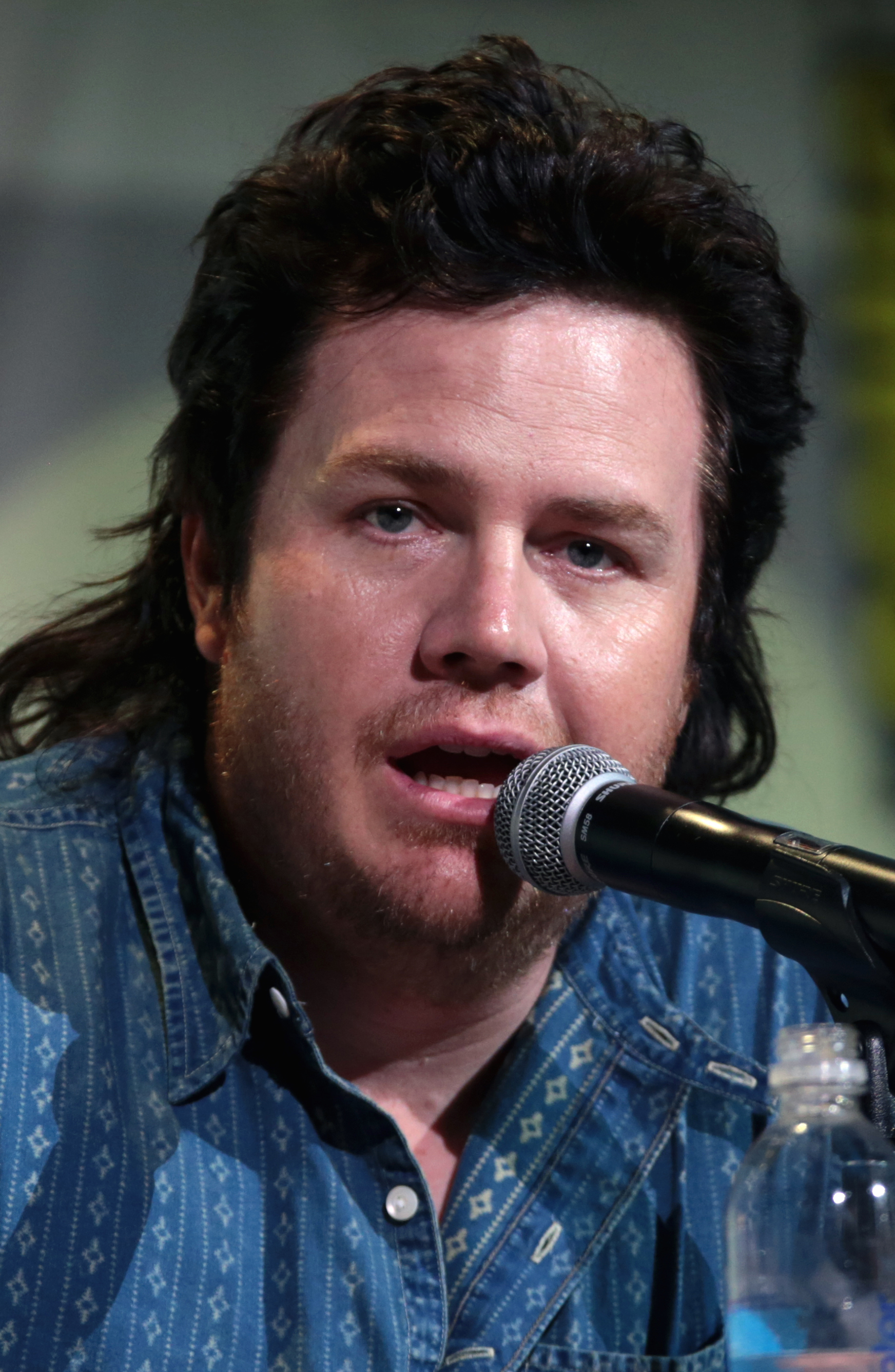
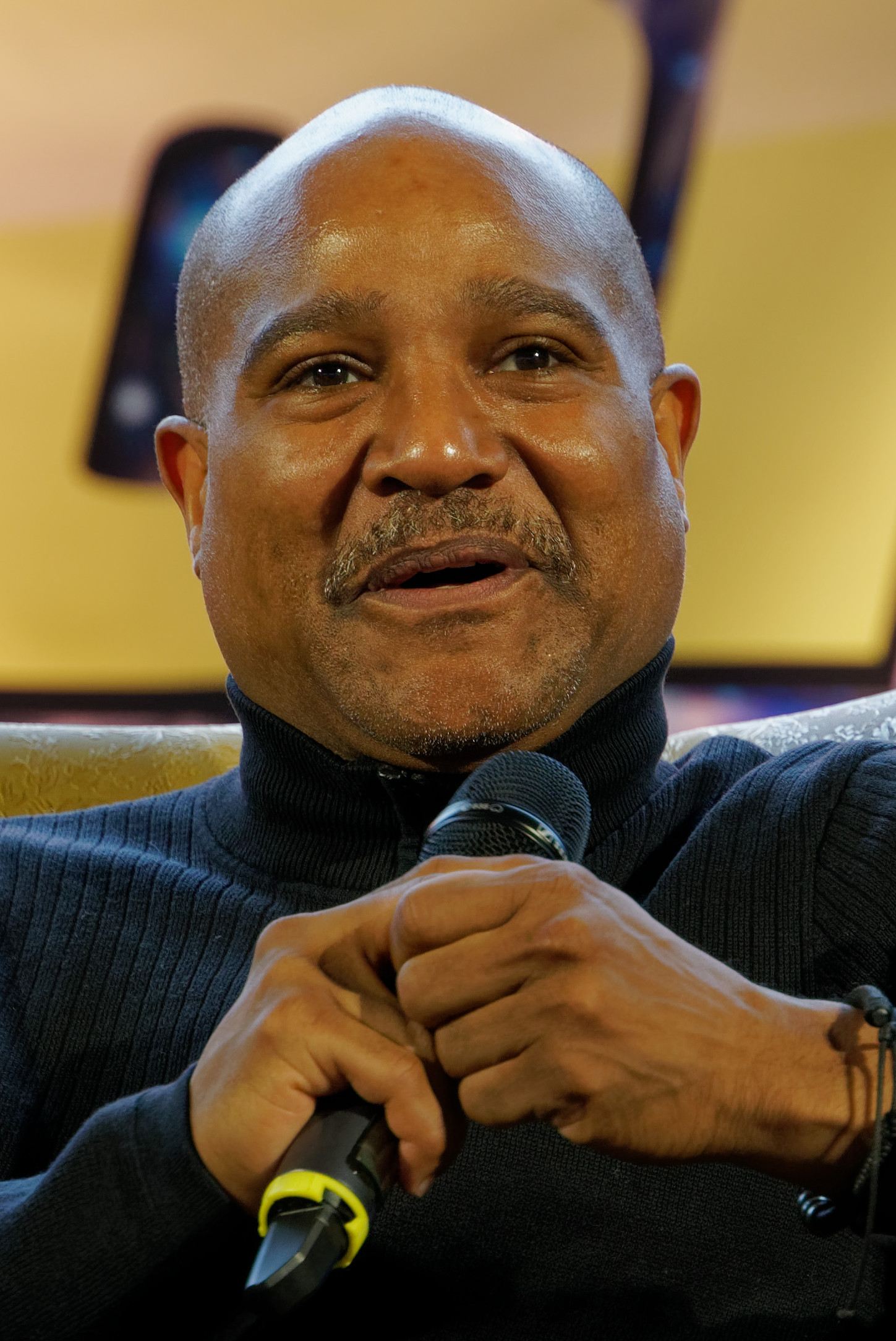
Christian Serratos (Rosita Espinosa), Josh McDermitt (Eugene Porter), and Seth Gilliam (Gabriel Stokes)
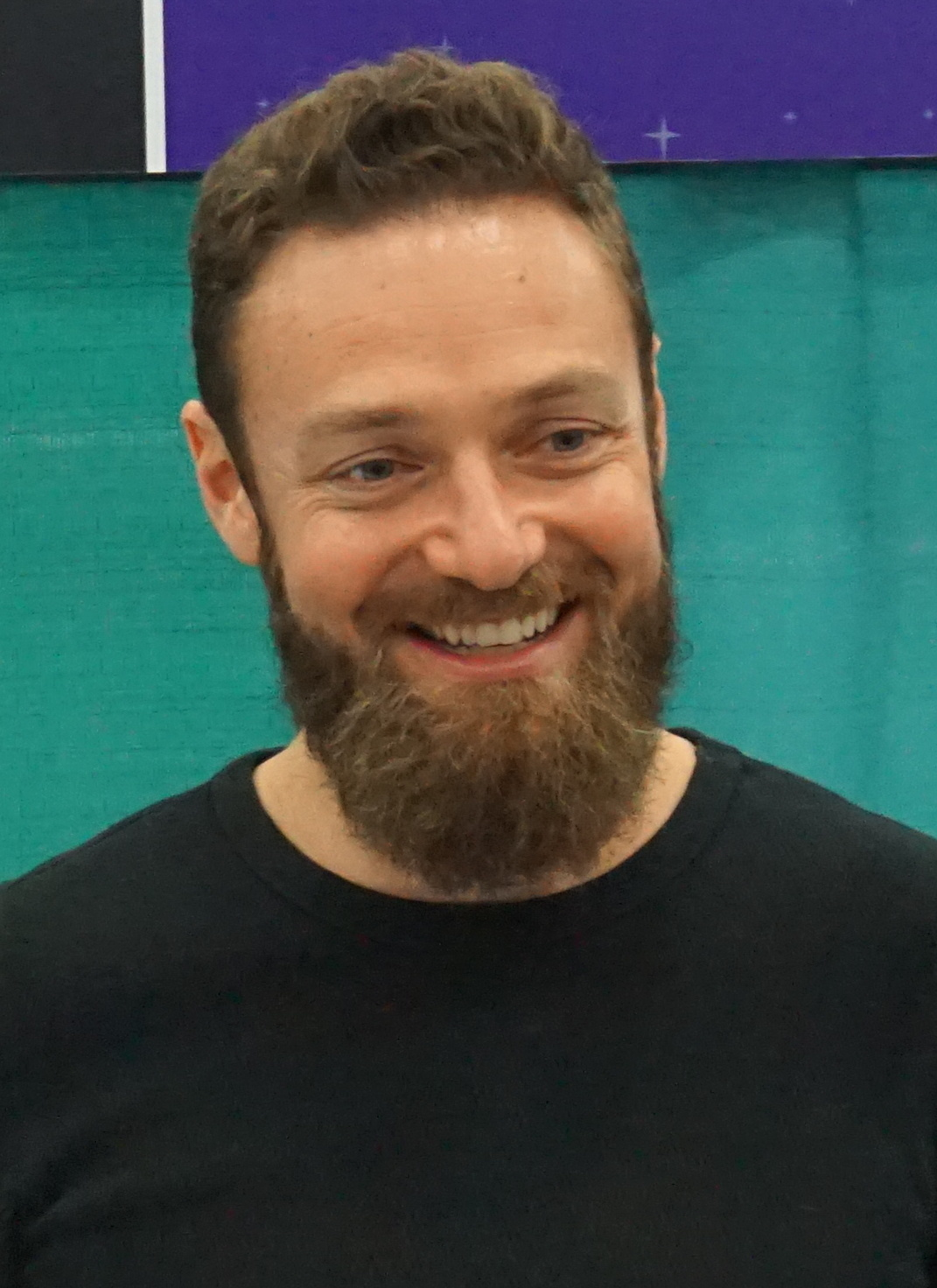
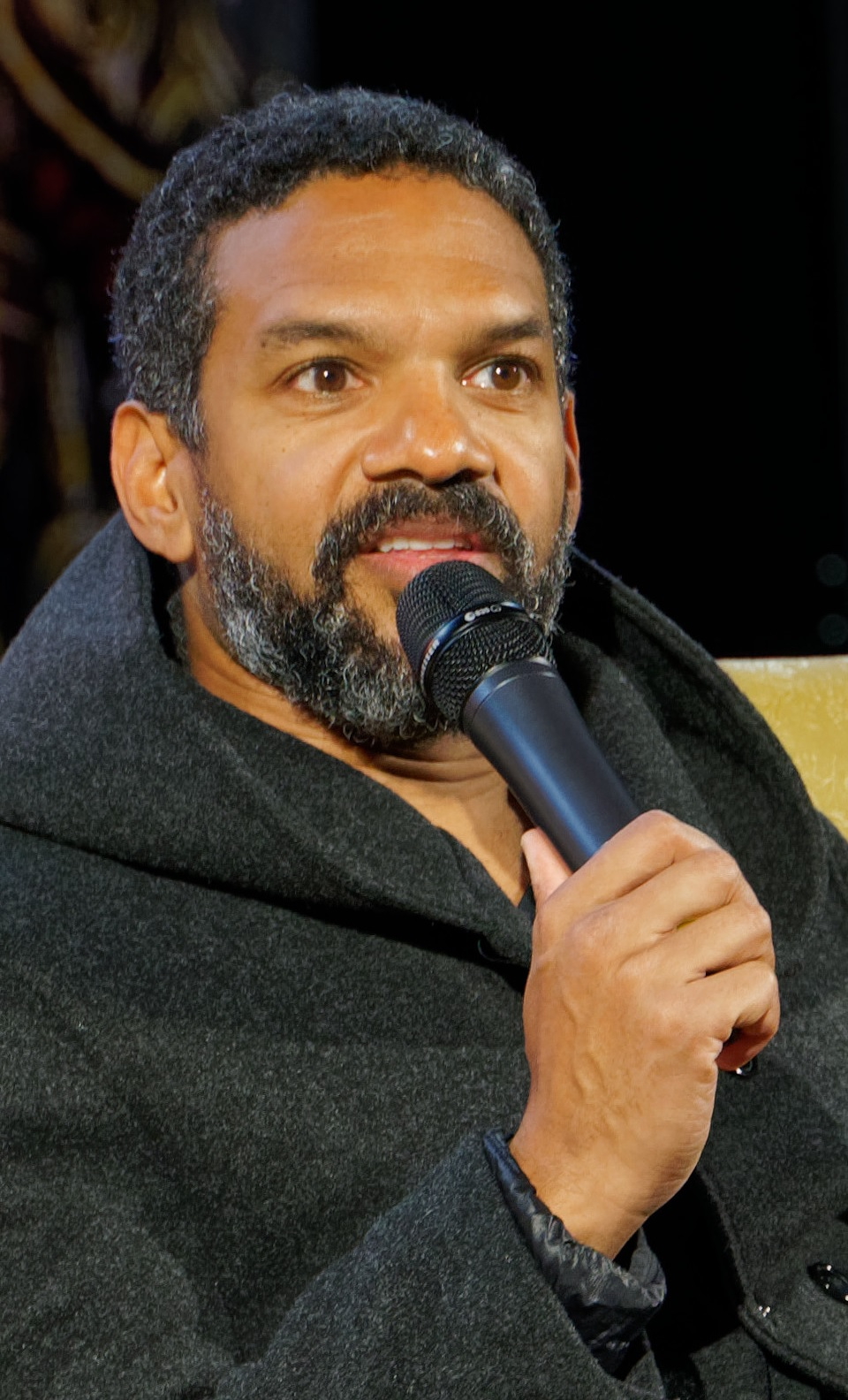
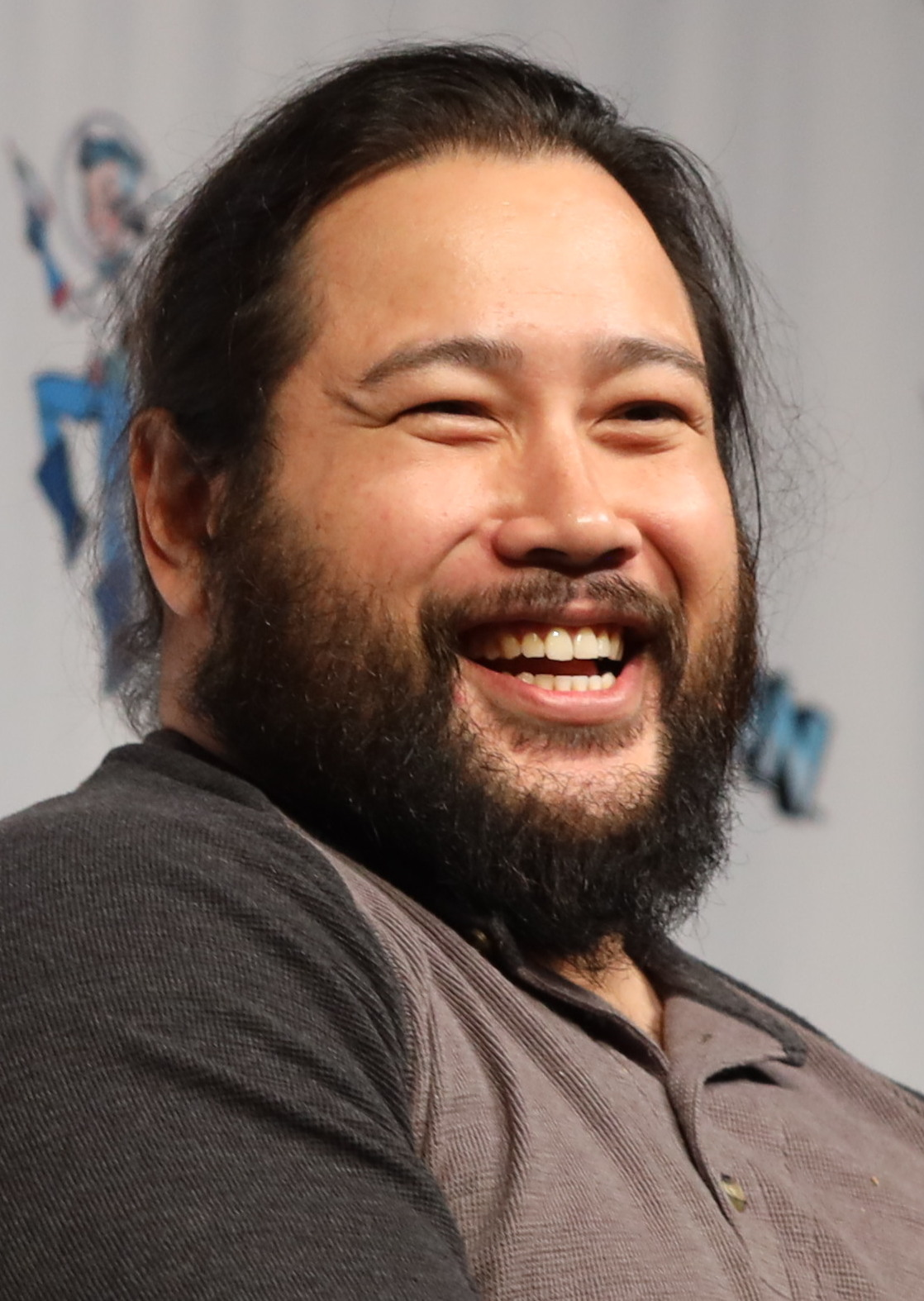
Ross Marquand (Aaron), Khary Payton (Ezekiel), and Cooper Andrews (Jerry)
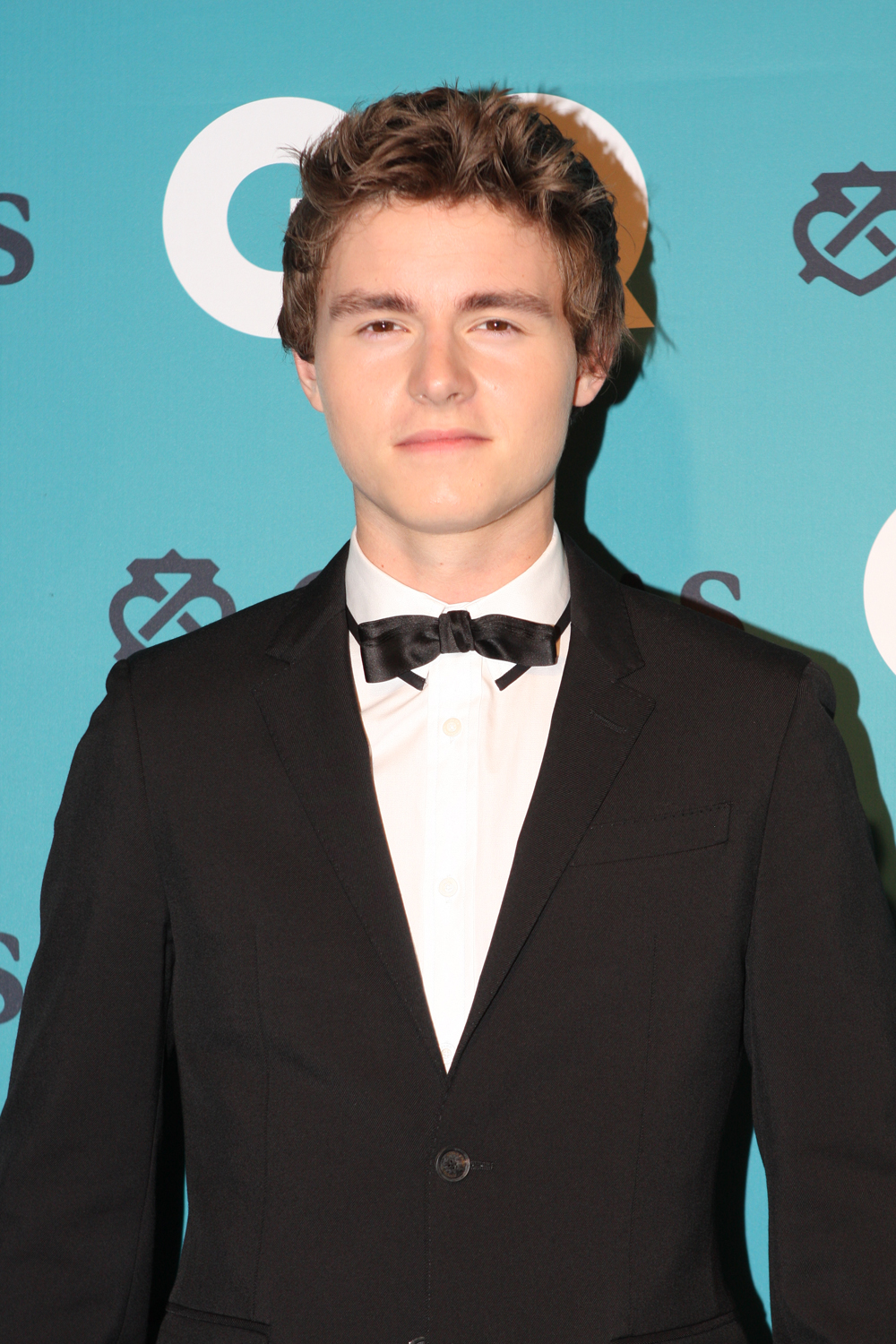
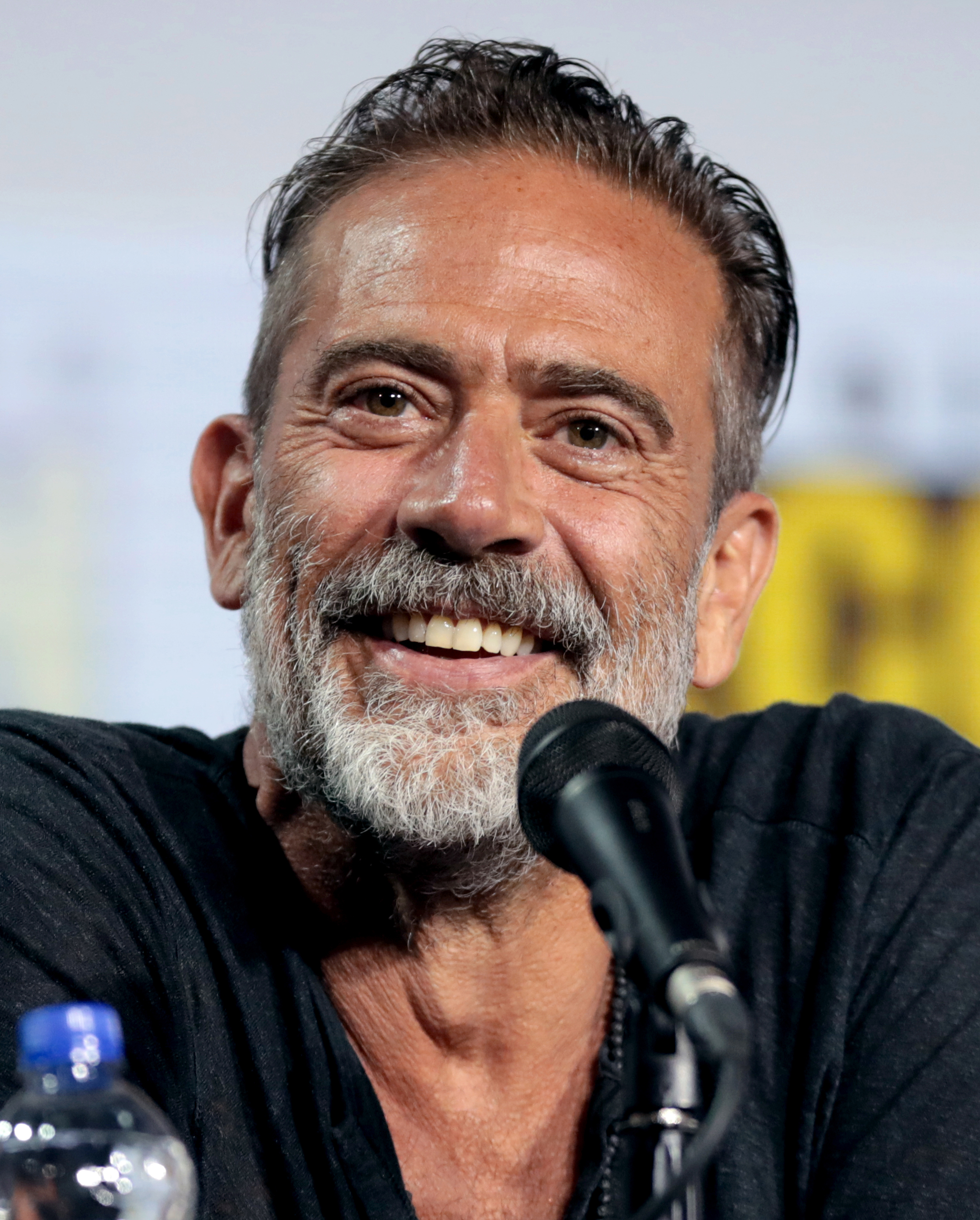
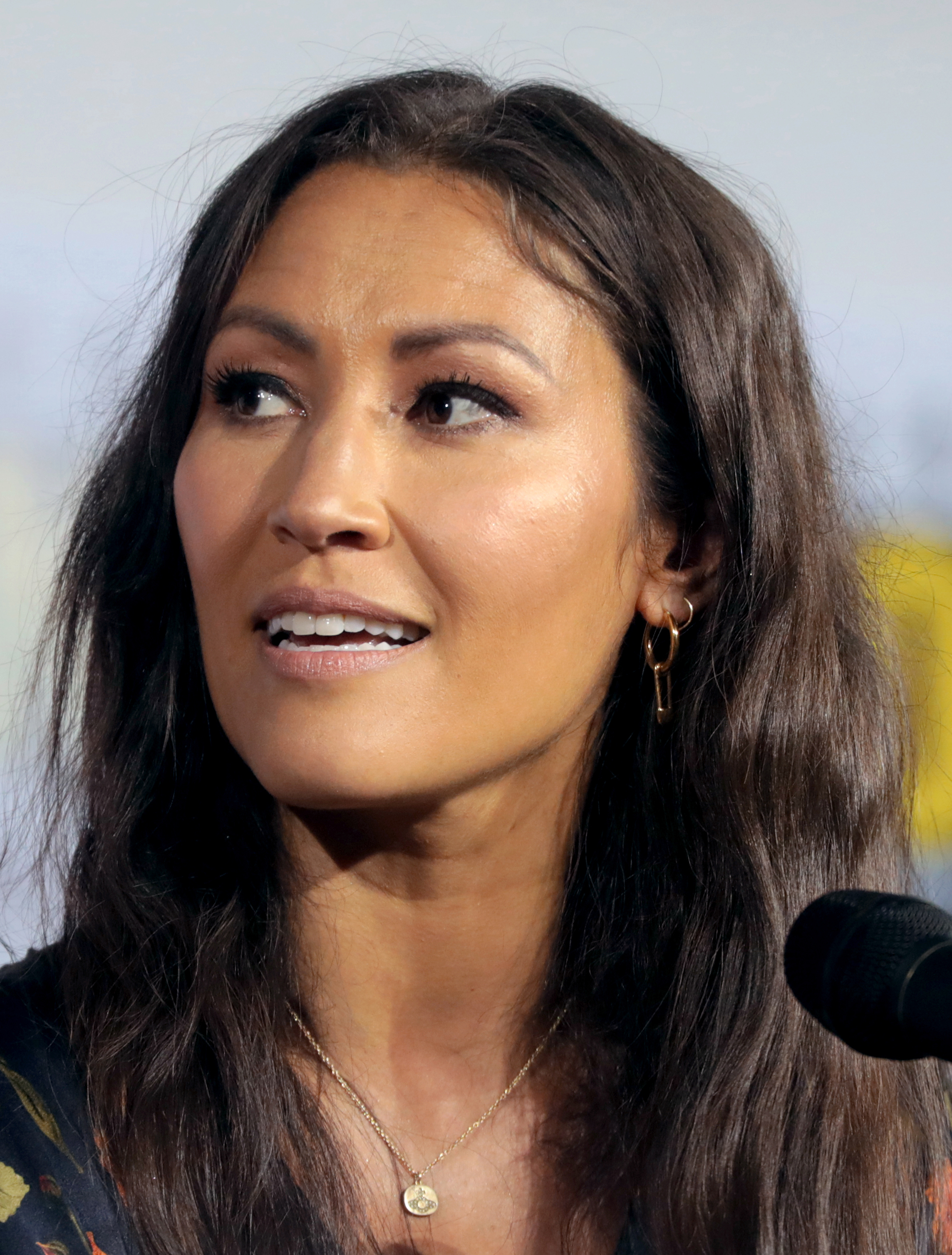
Callan McAuliffe (Alden), Jeffrey Dean Morgan (Negan), and Eleanor Matsuura (Yumiko)
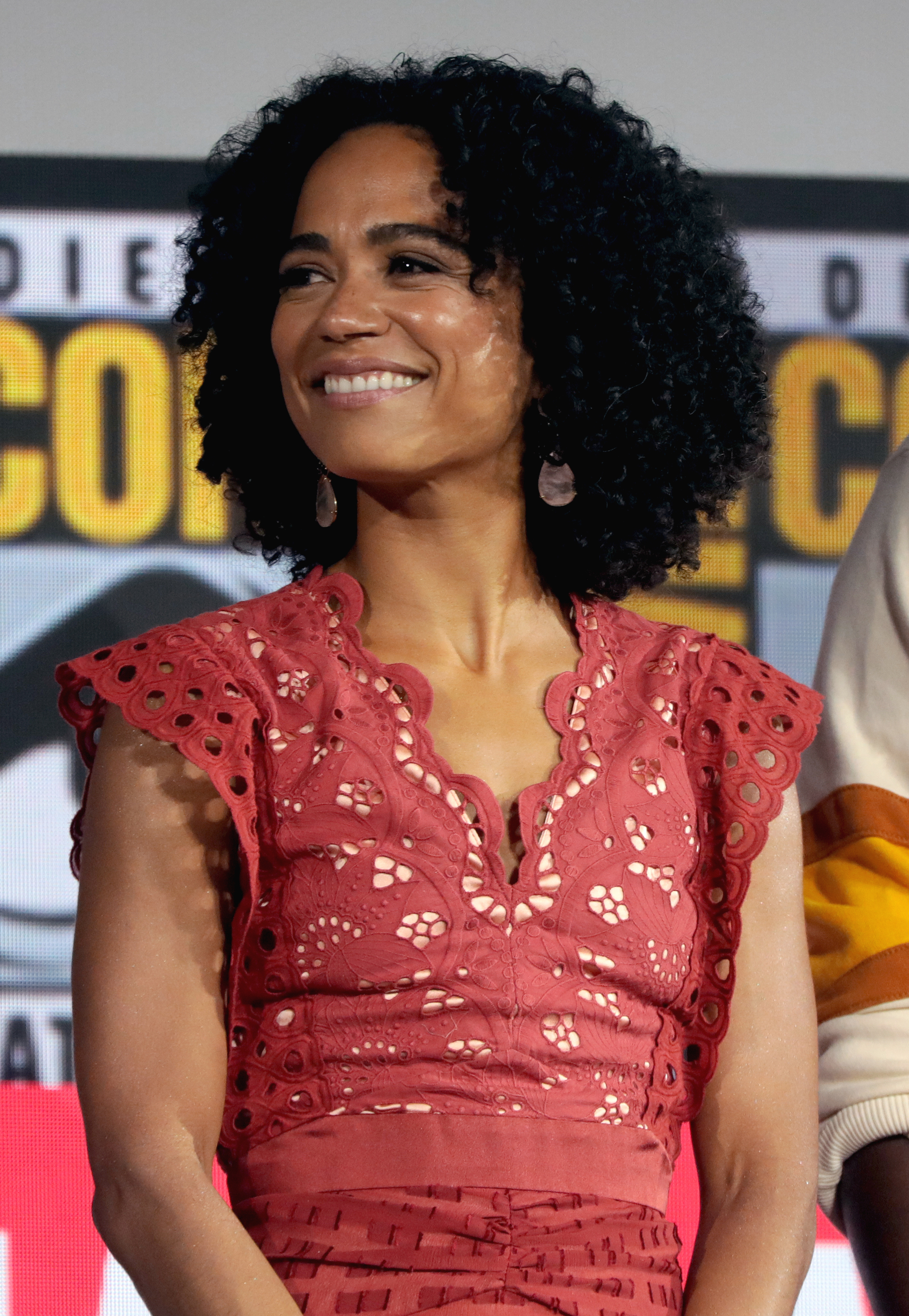
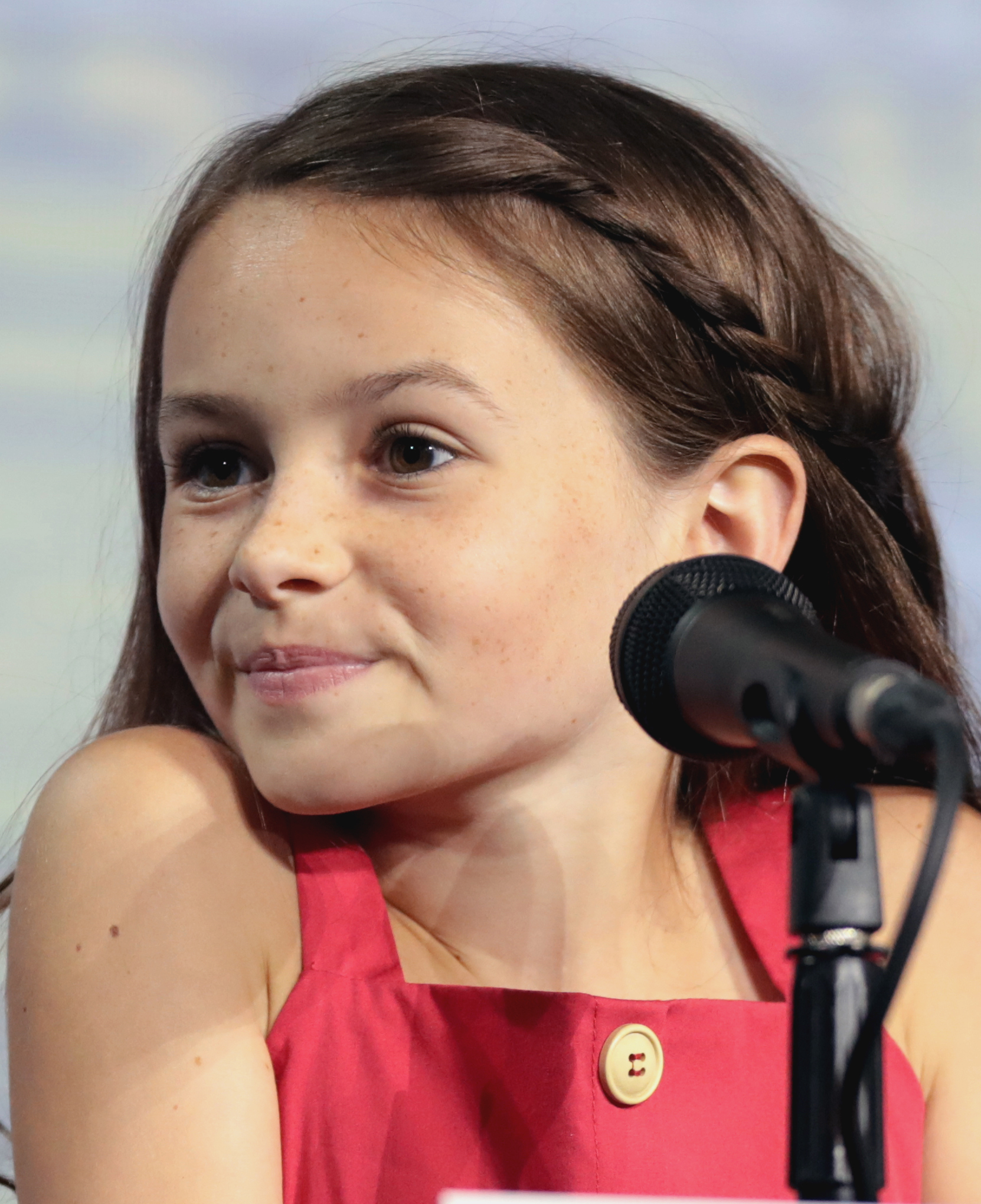
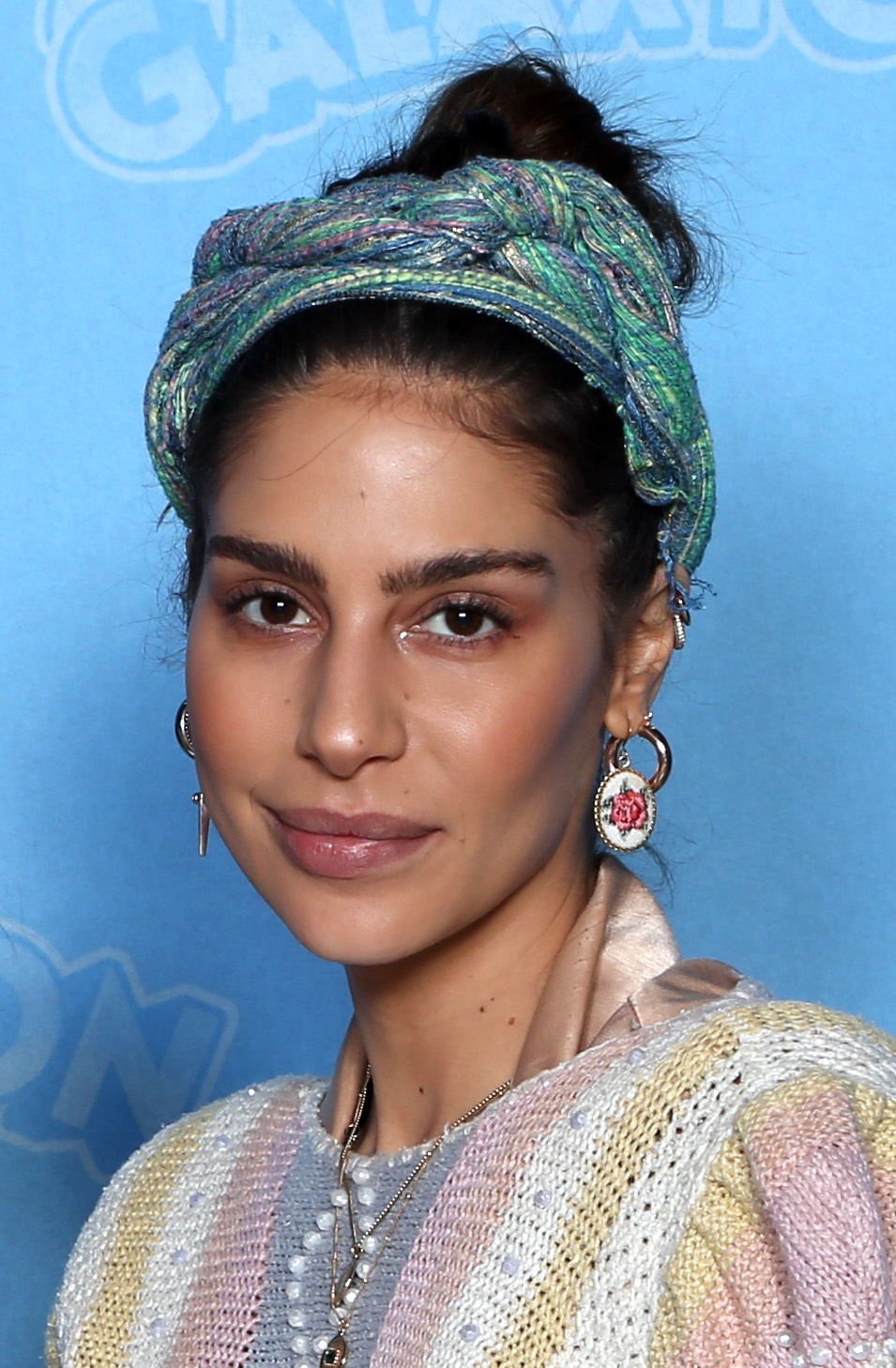
Lauren Ridloff (Connie), Cailey Fleming (Judith Grimes), and Nadia Hilker (Magna)

The eleventh season features twenty-three series regulars overall. Callan McAuliffe and Cooper Andrews are added to the opening credits after previously being credited as "also starring". Beginning with episode 17, Eleanor Matsuura, Lauren Ridloff, Cailey Fleming, Nadia Hilker, Cassady McClincy, Angel Theory, Paola Lázaro, Michael James Shaw, Josh Hamilton, and Laila Robins are added to the opening credits after being credited as "also starring".

==== Starring ====
- Norman Reedus as Daryl Dixon, a skilled hunter and former recruiter for Alexandria. He is also the owner of Dog.
- Melissa McBride as Carol Peletier, a survivor who has overcome several traumas, is a skilled and ingenious fighter, and now resides at Alexandria. She is also Ezekiel's ex-wife.
- Lauren Cohan as Maggie Greene, the former leader of the Hilltop and Hershel's mother who has a grudge against Negan for killing her husband, Glenn.
- Christian Serratos as Rosita Espinosa, a pragmatic member of the group who is mother to her and late Siddiq's child, Coco. She is also in a relationship with Gabriel.
- Josh McDermitt as Eugene Porter, an intelligent survivor who has overcome his fear of walkers. He is leading an expedition to the Commonwealth.
- Seth Gilliam as Gabriel Stokes, a priest and head of the council of Alexandria who has reconciled his beliefs with what needs to be done to survive. He is also in a relationship with Rosita.
- Ross Marquand as Aaron, a former recruiter from Alexandria who is adoptive father to Gracie.
- Khary Payton as Ezekiel, the charismatic former leader of the Kingdom and Carol's ex-husband. He is also accompanying Eugene's expedition to the Commonwealth.
- Cooper Andrews as Jerry, a former resident of the Kingdom and Ezekiel's right-hand man who is Nabila's husband.
- Callan McAuliffe as Alden, a former member of the Saviors. He had been in a relationship with Enid, who was killed by Alpha.
- Jeffrey Dean Morgan as Negan, the reformed former leader of the Saviors who formed a parental bond with Alpha's daughter, Lydia, during the Whisperer War.
- Eleanor Matsuura as Yumiko, a proficient archer and former criminal defense lawyer who is Magna's ex-girlfriend. She is also accompanying Eugene's expedition to the Commonwealth.
- Lauren Ridloff as Connie, a deaf member of Magna's group who has a close bond with Daryl and was presumed to be dead during the Whisperer War. She was later found by Virgil near Oceanside, albeit weak and malnourished.
- Cailey Fleming as Judith Grimes, the daughter of Lori Grimes and Shane Walsh, and adopted daughter of Rick Grimes and Michonne.
- Nadia Hilker as Magna, the feisty former leader of a small group of roaming survivors. She is also Yumiko's ex-girlfriend.
- Cassady McClincy as Lydia, Alpha's daughter and a former member of the Whisperers, who formed a parental bond with Negan during the Whisperer War and now resides in Alexandria. She had been in a relationship with Henry, who was killed by Alpha.
- Angel Theory as Kelly, Connie's alert and protective sister who has a gradual hearing loss.
- Paola Lázaro as Juanita "Princess" Sanchez, a quirky and flamboyant survivor who has suffered various traumas in her past. She is also accompanying Eugene's expedition to the Commonwealth.
- Michael James Shaw as Michael Mercer, a resident of the Commonwealth who serves as the general of the Commonwealth military.
- Josh Hamilton as Lance Hornsby, the deputy governor and director of operations to the Commonwealth.
- Laila Robins as Pamela Milton, the governor of the Commonwealth.

==== Also starring ====
- Lynn Collins as Leah Shaw, a member of the Reapers and former owner of Dog who formed a loving connection with Daryl while searching for Rick after his disappearance.
- Margot Bingham as Maxxine "Stephanie" Mercer, a resident of the Commonwealth who communicated with Eugene over the radio the previous season. She is also Michael's younger sister.

=== Supporting cast ===
==== Alexandria Safe-Zone ====
- C. Thomas Howell as Roy, a former resident and guard of the Hilltop.
- Jackson Pace as Gage, a former resident of the Hilltop who resented Lydia over the deaths of his friends during the Whisperer War.
- Antony Azor as Rick "R.J." Grimes Jr., the son of Rick and Michonne.
- Anabelle Holloway as Gracie, the adoptive daughter of Aaron.
- Mandi Christine Kerr as Barbara, a resident of Alexandria.

==== The Hilltop ====
- Kerry Cahill as Dianne, one of Ezekiel's top soldiers and a skilled archer.
- Gustavo Gomez as Marco, a supply runner of the Hilltop.

==== Oceanside ====
- Avianna Mynhier as Rachel Ward, a teenage member of Oceanside who represents her community.
- Dan Fogler as Luke, a former music teacher who has come to appreciate safety in numbers. He is also in a relationship with Jules.
- Alex Sgambati as Jules, a member of Oceanside who is in a relationship with Luke.

==== The Wardens ====
- Okea Eme-Akwari as Elijah, a mysterious and masked member of the Wardens.
- James Devoti as Cole, a trusted member of the Wardens.
- Kien Michael Spiller as Hershel Rhee, the son of Glenn and Maggie.
- Glenn Stanton as Frost, a member of the Wardens who despises Negan for what he did to their leader Maggie.
- Laurie Fortier as Agatha, a member of the Wardens who also despises Negan.
- Marcus Lewis as Duncan, a tough member of the Wardens who also despises Negan.

==== The Reapers ====
- Ritchie Coster as Pope, the leader of the Reapers and a veteran of the War in Afghanistan.
- Jacob Young as Deaver, a member of the Reapers.
- Alex Meraz as Brandon Carver, a member of the Reapers and Leah's right-hand man.
- Dikran Tulaine as Mancea, a member of the Reapers who serves as the group's priest.
- Branton Box as Fisher, a vicious member of the Reapers.
- Eric LeBlanc as Marcus Powell, a member of the Reapers who befriends Daryl.
- Robert Hayes as Paul Wells, an arrogant member of the Reapers.
- Hans Christopher as Nicholls, a member of the Reapers who encounters Gabriel.
- Lex Lauletta as Austin, a fiesty and aggressive member of the Reapers.
- Ethan McDowell as Ira Washington, a stoic member of the Reapers.
- Dane Davenport as Ancheta, a member of the Reapers who serves as the group's engineer.
- Michael Shenefelt as Bossie, a member of the Reapers who stalks Maggie and Negan.

==== The Commonwealth ====
- Carrie Genzel as Clark, a resident and auditor for the Commonwealth.
- Matthew Cornwell as Evans, a resident and auditor for the Commonwealth.
- Chelle Ramos as Shira, a resident and spy for the Commonwealth.
- Ian Anthony Dale as Tomi, a long-time resident of the Commonwealth and Yumiko's long-lost brother.
- Teo Rapp-Olsson as Sebastian Milton, Pamela's entitled and arrogant son.
- Courtney Dietz as Kayla Brand, a resident of the Commonwealth and Sebastian's girlfriend.
- Jason Turner as Marcus Colvin, a lawyer in the Commonwealth who prosecutes Eugene.
- Cameron Roberts as Tyler Davis, a former soldier in the Commonwealth military who was dishonorably discharged following the events of the previous season.
- Michael Tourek as Roman Calhoun, a mysterious resident of the Commonwealth who works for Lance.
- Nicholas Velez as Theo, a nurse at the Commonwealth who befriends Ezekiel.
- Jason Butler Harner as Toby Carlson, a ruthless former CIA agent who works for Hornsby.
- Wynn Everett as April Martens, a resident of the Commonwealth who participates in Sebastian's heist.
- Monique Grant as Vickers, the colonel of the Commonwealth military.
- Greg Perrow as Nelson, a soldier in the Commonwealth military who attended Gabriel's sermons.
- Brian McClure as Wilson, a fearful train engineer for the Commonwealth.
- Mahdi Cocci as Roberts, a soldier in the Commonwealth military.
- Elizabeth Becka as Marian George, a judge in the Commonwealth.
- Dexter Tillis as Rose, the lieutenant in the Commonwealth military.

==== Riverbend ====
- Medina Senghore as Annie, a resident of Riverbend and Negan's wife.
- Michael Biehn as Ian, the unhinged leader of the Riverbend with a twisted sense of humor.
- Jenique Hendrix as Hart, an intimidating resident of Riverbend who wields a long scythe.

==== Miscellaneous ====
- Brad Fleischer as Keith, the leader of the remaining Whisperers residing in the ruins of Hilltop.
- Jesse C. Boyd as Edward, the second-in-command the Wolves who appears in Aaron's dream.
- Kevin Carroll as Virgil, a survivor who sought Michonne's help to look for his family. He later found Connie near Oceanside, albeit weak and malnourished.
- Andrew Lincoln as Rick Grimes, a former sheriff's deputy from King County, Georgia, and the former leader of the Alexandria Safe-Zone who was presumed to be dead in the ninth season.
- Danai Gurira as Michonne: a katana-wielding warrior and Rick's romantic partner who left the group to search for her lover.

== Episodes ==
No. overall	No. in season	Title	Directed by	Written by	Original release date	U.S. viewers (millions)
154	1	"Acheron: Part I"	Kevin Dowling	Angela Kang & Jim Barnes	August 22, 2021	2.22
With Alexandria's food supply dwindling, Maggie leads a team (among them Daryl, Gabriel, Alden and Negan) to scavenge Meridian, a place where she lived prior to returning to Alexandria. Elsewhere, Eugene, Ezekiel, Yumiko and Princess are interrogated by auditors of the Commonwealth. They are able to escape from the outpost, but Yumiko learns that her brother might be in the community so they decide to stay. Maggie's group descends into a subway station, but are ambushed by walkers. As the group climbs up a subway car ladder to safety, Daryl and Dog become separated from the others. Maggie is the last one to ascend the ladder but Negan abandons her as she struggles; she loses her grip and falls.
155	2	"Acheron: Part II"	Kevin Dowling	Angela Kang & Jim Barnes	August 29, 2021	1.99
Maggie escapes from the walkers and reunites with the main group inside the subway car, revealing how Negan abandoned her. Gage, who had fled with the group's supplies along with Roy, returns but is followed by a horde of walkers; Maggie refuses to save him, causing Gage to stab himself before being devoured. Daryl and Dog find the wounded Roy, and Daryl makes his way back to the group, helping them escape the horde lured by Gage. The group leaves the subway station only to be attacked by the Reapers who kill Roy. Yumiko requests expedited processing from the Commonwealth auditors. When interrogated by Mercer, Eugene tells him about Stephanie and lies that he is not part of a larger settlement. Mercer is convinced and allows the group to complete their processing; a woman is brought forth, introducing herself as Stephanie.
156	3	"Hunted"	Frederick E.O. Toye	Vivian Tse	September 5, 2021	1.87
The Reapers ambush Maggie's group in the woods, killing Cole and Duncan; the group scatters. The following day, Maggie continues to be hunted by the Reapers but later joins up with Negan and Alden, the latter of whom insists he is too injured to continue and wants to be left behind. Maggie and Negan continue without Alden, to retrieve supplies from a supply depot in Arbor Hills. At Alexandria, Carol, Rosita, Magna and Kelly retrieve some of the community's escaped horses. Carol has to slaughter one of them to provide food for the starving community.
157	4	"Rendition"	Frederick E.O. Toye	Nicole Mirante-Matthews	September 12, 2021	1.88
Daryl is stalked by one of the Reapers and becomes separated from Dog. Soon after, he finds Dog sitting comfortably next to a masked female Reaper who reveals herself to be Daryl's former romantic partner, Leah. Daryl is subsequently imprisoned by the group and tortured for information at Meridian. Leah convinces Daryl to tell the group's leader, Pope, something to appease him; Daryl obliges with minimal information. As a test arranged by Pope, Daryl and Leah are locked inside a shed by Pope's men, who proceed to burn it to the ground; the two manage to escape. Pope ensures Daryl is welcomed into the group but Daryl appears uncomfortable with the arrangement, having witnessed Pope's unhinged treatment towards a member of his group.
158	5	"Out of the Ashes"	Greg Nicotero	LaToya Morgan	September 19, 2021	1.91
Carol, Aaron, Jerry and Lydia go to the ruins of the Hilltop Colony to look for supplies and find a small group of Whisperers still alive. Demanding information, Aaron tortures the leader, who insists that they're no longer a threat; Carol stops Aaron before he does something he might regret. In exchange for his life being spared, the Whisperer informs the group about Connie's whereabouts; they decide to leave the next morning to look for her. Eugene, Ezekiel, Yumiko and Princess go through orientation at the Commonwealth; Yumiko reunites with her brother, Tomi. While Eugene tours the community with Stephanie, she offers to help him contact Alexandria on the radio. They are caught by soldiers of the community and placed under arrest, then released on the orders of Lance Hornsby, the deputy governor and director of operations. Maggie and Negan trudge through the woods and stop in an abandoned neighborhood house to wait for the others; they are eventually joined by Gabriel and Elijah. In Alexandria, Judith clashes with the local teenagers.
159	6	"On the Inside"	Greg Nicotero	Kevin Deiboldt	September 26, 2021	1.78
Connie and Virgil have been surviving together and are chased into a mansion populated by a group of people driven insane who have resorted to feral cannibalism. The pair are able to defeat most of the cannibals and are rescued by a group consisting of Kelly, Magna, Carol and Rosita, with the sisters being reunited at last. Daryl is forced to torture Frost for the location of Maggie's hideout. While reconnoitring with a team of Reapers led by Leah, Daryl does his best to protect his friends from their search. Maggie's group escapes, despite the Reaper Carver's suspicions of Daryl. When they return to Meridian, Leah's group learns that Pope killed Frost after further interrogation.
160	7	"Promises Broken"	Sharat Raju	Julia Ruchman	October 3, 2021	1.89
At the Commonwealth, Eugene, Ezekiel, Princess and Stephanie are sentenced to community service clearing walkers from buildings. Eugene and Stephanie save Sebastian Milton, the son of Governor Pamela Milton, from walkers but when Sebastian is ungrateful Eugene punches him, getting himself imprisoned. Lance offers Eugene freedom and help for his community if he gives up Alexandria's location. The Reapers are growing frustrated due to being unable to find Maggie's group. Daryl and Leah find a family in the woods and Leah refuses to kill them against Pope's orders. Negan forces Maggie to promise to stop plotting to kill him in exchange for his help against the Reapers and she reluctantly agrees. Negan fashions a Whisperer mask for Maggie and trains her to command walkers so they can gather a horde to attack Meridian. During preparation, Negan admits to Maggie he should have killed Rick's entire group during their initial confrontation to convince her of his honesty.
161	8	"For Blood"	Sharat Raju	Erik Mountain	October 10, 2021	1.91
A storm hits Alexandria and the survivors struggle to keep walkers at bay when it brings down some of the walls. Maggie's group leads their horde to Meridian, where Leah grows disgusted with Pope's callous disregard for the lives of the Reapers, after one Reaper is killed by the disguised group among the horde. As night falls, the Reapers begin destroying the horde with land mines. Daryl helps Maggie and Gabriel infiltrate Meridian and allow walkers inside and finally confesses to Leah his allegiance to Maggie. Leah is aghast but when Pope prepares to fire a hwacha at walker and Reaper alike, she kills him. Despite Daryl inviting her to join his group, Leah refuses, remaining loyal to her family with the Reapers and taking leadership of them. Leah outs Daryl's true allegiance to the other Reapers and attacks the group with the hwacha.
162	9	"No Other Way"	Jon Amiel	Corey Reed	February 20, 2022	1.76
The herd is destroyed by the Reapers's hwacha but Maggie's group escapes and enters into a dangerous cat and mouse game with the Reapers, killing several. The group captures Carver whom Daryl offers to trade for Leah and the others leaving peacefully. After Gabriel kills their sniper, Leah takes the deal. A vengeful Maggie kills all of the remaining Reapers in cold blood aside from Leah who Daryl allows to escape. Maggie returns for Alden, only to discover that he has died and reanimated. Recognizing that Maggie will never let go of her hatred for him, Negan departs on his own. The surviving members of Maggie's team return to Alexandria – which managed to survive the events of the storm – with the food where Daryl is finally reunited with Connie and Eugene arrives with Lance Hornsby and the Commonwealth. Six months later, Maggie is leading a community in the ruins of the Hilltop and has a stand-off with Commonwealth soldiers led by Daryl.
163	10	"New Haunts"	Jon Amiel	Magali Lozano	February 27, 2022	1.60
Thirty days after the Alexandrians entered the Commonwealth, the community celebrates Halloween. Daryl and Rosita train to join the Commonwealth military and much of the group is still struggling to become a part of the large, well-off society. At a masquerade ball held by Governor Pamela Milton, a disgraced former soldier, Tyler Davis, takes "Max" hostage out of desperation to speak to Pamela but flees; Daryl gets him to surrender but allows Sebastian to take credit for his capture. Several group members also notice the vast class divide in the Commonwealth.
164	11	"Rogue Element"	Michael Cudlitz	David Leslie Johnson-McGoldrick	March 6, 2022	1.67
Eugene has entered a relationship with Stephanie and tells her he loves her; shortly after she says she loves him too, she mysteriously disappears. Eugene becomes obsessed with finding Stephanie and breaks into a man's house looking for evidence but fails and Princess insists that she must have broken up with and abandoned him. Eugene soon finds Stephanie again colluding with Lance for an unknown task and gets Lance to confess "Stephanie" was a plant named Shira who was used to get Eugene to confess the location of Alexandria due to too many inconsistencies during the group's auditing. Lance tells Eugene the group is better off now despite his heart being broken by Shira. Connie and Kelly investigate the Commonwealth military and their treatment of Tyler Davis; and Carol helps Lance deal with a neighboring community whose leader is extorting the Commonwealth for money. Eugene is later approached by "Max", who reveals herself to be the woman he was in contact with over the radio.
165	12	"The Lucky Ones"	Tawnia McKiernan	Vivian Tse	March 13, 2022	1.58
The woman introduces herself to Eugene as Max Mercer, who was using her mother's name as a code name. Even though she wanted to meet Eugene, once her brother Mercer got wind of it, he covered it up when Lance also was alerted to her breach in communication protocol, and forced herself to remain quiet upon seeing Eugene with Shira. Eugene storms away due to being too hurt, but eventually goes to reconcile with Max and the pair express lingering interest in each other. Meanwhile, Pamela takes a tour of the Coalition's settlements and is unimpressed to hear Alexandria has fallen more than once. After meeting with Oceanside, Pamela goes to Hilltop where she debates Maggie over their different leadership styles and forms of government. Maggie is suspicious of the Commonwealth and refuses to accept aid from them, to the frustration of several Hilltop residents who decide to go join the Commonwealth. Lance is also frustrated by Maggie's decision but insists to Aaron he will persevere, seeking to build up his power to get out from under Pamela. Ezekiel is admitted for surgery to remove his tumor, having been moved up the line for treatment by Lance as a favor to Carol.
166	13	"Warlords"	Loren Yaconelli	Jim Barnes & Erik Mountain	March 20, 2022	1.79
Aaron and Gabriel are recruited by Aaron's boss Toby Carlson to take point on an outreach mission with a community in an apartment complex to offer them membership with the Commonwealth. The group's leader, Ian, meets with Aaron, Gabriel, Carlson, and Jesse and believes them to be enemies. Though Aaron and Gabriel talk Ian into letting them leave with their lives, Carlson attacks and kills him and many of his people. Carlson has actually been assigned by Lance to wipe out the complex, believing them responsible for an attack on a Commonwealth caravan. Gabriel is reunited with Negan, who has joined the complex community, and the latter covertly sends a message to Hilltop with the fleeing Jesse. Maggie, Lydia and Elijah go to the complex to fight the Commonwealth troops after reuniting with Aaron.
167	14	"The Rotten Core"	Marcus Stokes	Erik Mountain & Jim Barnes	March 27, 2022	1.55
Sebastian strong-arms Daryl and Rosita to go collect a cache of money from a walker-infested house for him due to his mother cutting off his credit line. The pair retrieve the money and try to help April, a woman who was previously forced by Sebastian to try to perform the task alongside many others, who had perished in the attempt; Mercer and Carol come to their aid but April is killed by walkers. Mercer kills two Commonwealth troopers who were loyal to Sebastian and has Daryl and Rosita deliver the money, fearing retribution if they don't. At the complex, the group joins forces with Negan, Annie and the complex survivors. They learn that Negan has married Annie and is expecting a child with her. Hershel, who had stowed away on Maggie's truck, is rescued by Negan and forces him to confess to Glenn's murder and nearly kills him before being talked down. The group corners and kills Carlson and it is revealed that Leah was the one who raided the Commonwealth caravan and weapons.
168	15	"Trust"	Lily Mariye	Kevin Deiboldt	April 3, 2022	1.67
Lance questions Gabriel and Aaron, then leads a group of Commonwealth troopers to Hilltop to question Maggie. Lance intensely questions Hershel about Maggie's potential involvement, leading to a tense confrontation as Elijah and Maggie threaten Lance. After leaving Hilltop, Lance comes across Leah, who he recruits for a job. Mercer and Princess have developed a sexual relationship, as Mercer struggles with the decision to kill his own men. Rosita tells Eugene about what happened with Sebastian and he calls in Connie and Kelly to report on the matter; they realize that April was one of the names on the list that Connie received. Eugene convinces Max to continue to help him on the inside and they kiss for the first time. Inspired by Carol and his new lease on life, Ezekiel opens a secret clinic for those still far down the list, recruiting Tomi to help him with surgery.
169	16	"Acts of God"	Catriona McKenzie	Nicole Mirante-Matthews	April 10, 2022	1.61
After realizing it is hopeless to negotiate with Maggie, Lance begins to plan an attack on the Hilltop. Maggie leaves Hershel in the care of Negan and Annie, telling Negan that she is starting to trust him. Leah lures Maggie away from the colony and kidnaps her. Elsewhere, Daryl, Aaron, and Gabriel are betrayed by the Commonwealth soldiers who are ordered by Lance to eliminate them. The trio narrowly escape death; Aaron is wounded in the process. Leah takes Maggie to her old cabin and threatens her. Maggie frees herself and fights Leah but the latter overpowers her. Daryl shows up and is forced to kill Leah. Maggie and Daryl escape from the cabin as Lance and his soldiers approach. Daryl, Maggie, Aaron and Gabriel rendezvous with Negan and prepare for war against the Commonwealth. Max investigates Pamela Milton and assembles some members of Alexandria to post an article in the newspaper about Pamela's lies. Lance and his troopers take control of Alexandria, Hilltop, and Oceanside; Lance flips a coin to decide the fate of Oceanside's residents.
170	17	"Lockdown"	Greg Nicotero	Julia Ruchman	October 2, 2022	1.19
Hiding from Lance's soldiers in an abandoned town and concerned for those in the group still at the Commonwealth, the group decides to send Negan in as a spy since no one knows him there. Together, Daryl and Negan ambush a group of soldiers with the help of Negan's old Whisperer mask and Negan steals a vehicle. Negan arrives at the Commonwealth where he is privately interrogated by Mercer and reveals his identity to him. Negan then is reunited with Carol. Meanwhile some of the citizens turn rogue and begin hunting Sebastian. Carol and Negan locate Sebastian and safely deliver him to Pamela. Desperate, Pamela strikes an uneasy deal with Carol. At the same time, the others engage in a cat and mouse game with Lance's soldiers, killing several before they end up in a standoff.
171	18	"A New Deal"	Jeffrey F. January	Story by : Corey Reed; Teleplay by : Corey Reed & Kevin Deiboldt	October 9, 2022	1.35
Underground, the standoff escalates when Daryl takes Lance hostage just as Carol, Negan, Pamela, and Mercer arrive. Although the three of them manage to convince Daryl to surrender, he brutally stabs Lance in the hand as revenge for his earlier actions. Sometime later as the Commonwealth prepares to celebrate their anniversary, Carol confronts Daryl about what he did to Lance and confesses that he was trying to be more like Rick. Meanwhile an imprisoned Lance has Shira and Calhoun murder some Commonwealth janitors, and Max has a talk with Sebastian during which he rants on how the Commonwealth citizens are too civilized and weak not realizing she was recording the conversation. The following day, during the celebration, Sebastian prepares to deliver a recorded speech to the people but Max and Eugene play Max's recording instead. During the commotion, the reanimated janitors wander into the crowd, a vengeful Sebastian attempts to murder Max by pushing her on top of one of the walkers but Eugene saves her by throwing the walker on Sebastian who is severely bitten. Judith puts down the walker, but Sebastian dies of his wounds as a horrified crowd looks on.
172	19	"Variant"	Karen Gaviola	Vivian Tse	October 16, 2022	1.36
In the aftermath of the riot, Pamela orders Eugene's arrest for the murder of Sebastian, promising to pardon Max if Mercer cooperates. Concerned for his sister, Mercer mercilessly hunts for Eugene, but he is troubled by both Max and Princess' attempts to convince him that he is on the wrong side in the matter. After learning that Max has been arrested, Eugene turns himself in and takes sole responsibility for what happened, claiming that Max had nothing to do with the recording of Sebastian. Sebastian reanimates and a grieving Pamela has Roman executed and orders Lance to feed his corpse to Sebastian as a punishment. At the same time, Aaron, Jerry, Lydia and Elijah make their way towards Oceanside, but are forced to take cover at an old renaissance fair after spotting a herd with Jerry thinking that the fair might make a good location for a new Kingdom. At night, the herd attacks, led by what the group believes to be a surviving Whisperer, as it can climb, open doors and use weapons. However, Aaron discovers that it's actually just a walker. After putting it down, Aaron makes the troubling deduction that there must be other variants of walkers out there that are more dangerous than the usual roamers. Having developed feelings for Elijah, Lydia hesitates due to her love for Henry before taking Aaron's advice and starting a relationship with him.
173	20	"What's Been Lost"	Aisha Tyler	Erik Mountain	October 23, 2022	1.36
Carol and Daryl manage to escape Pamela's goons and break Lance out, knowing that he's the only one that can lead them to their missing friends. Finding a zombified Sebastian in Lance's cell, Daryl puts him down. At the same time, Pamela blackmails Yumiko into being the prosecutor in Eugene's show trial, promising to take Yumiko to her friends if she does and threatening Tomi as well to ensure her compliance. Yumiko is torn about what to do, but Eugene, who has accepted his possible fate, encourages Yumiko to have faith in their friends. After learning of Daryl, Carol and Lance's escape, Yumiko reminds the Commonwealth of how invaluable Tomi is before making the stunning public announcement that Pamela is unjustly persecuting Eugene, and Yumiko will be acting as Eugene's defense attorney instead of his prosecutor. After evading a herd and soldiers, Lance reveals that the missing people are being used as slave labor on a project to extend the Commonwealth's reach across the continent and that there's a supply train that they can follow. Fed up with Lance's manipulations and no longer needing his help, Daryl and Carol give Lance the chance to go into exile, but he draws a gun on them, prompting Carol to kill Lance with an arrow.
174	21	"Outpost 22"	Tawnia McKiernan	Jim Barnes	October 30, 2022	1.50
Maggie, Gabriel and Rosita manage to escape and eventually link up with Daryl and Carol as they track the Commonwealth's train to the mysterious Outpost 22. Daryl is haunted by the capture of Connie who has been separated out from the others as a Designation 2 while Maggie is haunted by losing Hershel, especially after fighting a child walker. At the Commonwealth's labor camp, Negan convinces a reluctant Ezekiel to set aside their differences and form a revolt against the sadistic Warden. At a junction, the others attack the train and rescue Connie. However, a dying trooper only knows that Designation 2's are taken far away and are never seen again while the engineer commits suicide rather than answer any questions. As the prisoners are delivered to Outpost 22, Rosita poses as a dead trooper over the train's radio and tricks a friendly trooper into revealing that Outpost 22 is actually Alexandria. Maggie declares that they will get their home and their people back and that Pamela will never know what hit her.
175	22	"Faith"	Rose Troche	Nicole Mirante-Matthews & Magali Lozano	November 6, 2022	1.39
Aaron, Lydia, Elijah and Jerry encounter Luke and Jules who had managed to escape from the takeover of Oceanside. Hunted by the Commonwealth, the group cover themselves in walker guts to hide amongst a massive herd. However, Commonwealth soldiers begin leading the herd somewhere and it is shown to contain at least one variant walker who picks up Lydia's dropped knife. At the Commonwealth, Eugene stands trial for the murder of Sebastian with Yumiko using the trial to reach out to the working class, stirring unrest. Eugene is found guilty and sentenced to execution, but Mercer and several soldiers break him out, secretly defecting to the side of the revolution. In Alexandria, Ezekiel and Negan plot a rebellion against the sadistic Warden, trying without success to enlist Tyler Davis, now a fellow prisoner, to their cause. Using the sewers, Daryl, Connie, Carol and Maggie manage to sneak in and rescue Hershel, but Rosita's daughter remains missing. After the rebellion is discovered, Negan attempts to martyr himself before Ezekiel leads a number of prisoners in stepping to Negan and Annie's defense. Ezekiel is able to convince most of the soldiers to stand down and they turn on the Warden who is subdued by Daryl. With Alexandria retaken by its residents, the Warden defiantly refuses to tell Rosita where to find her daughter, so she feeds him to a walker in revenge.
176	23	"Family"	Sharat Raju	Magali Lozano & Erik Mountain & Kevin Deiboldt	November 13, 2022	1.47
A number of Coalition forces and liberated prisoners use the Commonwealth's train to return to the city in order to overthrow Pamela; in honor of her family's vision of the future, Judith accompanies them. A remorseful Tyler makes amends for his past misdeeds with the others and suggests that the missing children have been taken to the Commonwealth's children's home while Negan and Ezekiel make peace with each other as well. Princess makes contact with Mercer who helps the group sneak in and plans to use the testimony of the liberated prisoners to legally remove Pamela from power. However, Pamela catches onto his deception and has Mercer arrested for treason. Pamela draws the Coalition into a trap, killing Tyler and several others before they manage to escape. While protecting Maggie, Judith is shot by Pamela. In an attempt to quell the rebellion, Pamela has a massive herd led to the city to trigger a lockdown, but the herd contains a number of variant walkers and is able to overrun the Commonwealth's defenses. While traveling with the herd, Aaron, Lydia and Jerry are separated from the others and Lydia is bitten, forcing an amputation. Jerry leaves to help the others as Luke and Jules manage to reunite with the others in the Commonwealth. Pamela orders her soldiers to protect the homes of the elite, abandoning the rest of the Commonwealth to their doom in order to save herself. As their friends struggle to hold back the herd, Daryl rushes Judith to the hospital for help.
177	24	"Rest in Peace"	Greg Nicotero	Story by : Angela Kang; Teleplay by : Corey Reed & Jim Barnes	November 20, 2022	2.27
Jules is devoured escaping from the horde while Luke is fatally bitten and dies shortly thereafter. Rosita, Gabriel and Eugene successfully rescue Coco, but Rosita is bitten on the left shoulder while escaping. After getting Judith to a safe house, she is treated by Tomi and reveals to Daryl and Carol that Michonne had left in search of a still-alive Rick. Princess and Max break Mercer out who leads his men and the Coalition forces in confronting Pamela as she barricades herself in the Estates. With the people outside about to be devoured, Daryl gives a rousing speech that causes Pamela's men to turn on her and allow everyone inside. Mercer arrests Pamela for her crimes, but she tries to feed herself to a zombified Lance instead. Recognizing that prison is a worse fate for Pamela, Maggie puts Lance down and saves her. United and joined by Aaron, Lydia, Jerry and Elijah, everyone lures the herd into the Estates and blows it up, destroying the herd and saving the Commonwealth. In the aftermath, Rosita peacefully succumbs to her bite while Negan apologizes to Maggie who is unable to forgive him, but decides to try moving past her anger. A year later, Ezekiel is the governor of the Commonwealth while the communities remain united in creating a better future. Now aware that Rick's alive, Daryl sets out on his own to find him. Elsewhere, Michonne continues her search for Rick. On Bloodsworth Island, where Michonne would eventually find his belongings, Rick writes a message for Michonne before being found by a CRM helicopter and forced to surrender.

== Production ==
The series was renewed for an eleventh season in October 2019. The eleventh season was officially announced on September 9, 2020, as the final season with Angela Kang serving as showrunner. In July 2020, AMC announced that season 11 would not premiere in October 2020 as planned due to production delays caused by the COVID-19 pandemic.

In 2014, executive producer David Alpert said that the comics have given them enough ideas for Rick Grimes and company over the next seven years. "I happen to love working from source material, specifically because we have a pretty good idea of what season 10 is gonna be," Alpert said. He continued by saying: "We know where seasons 11 and 12 [will be]... we have benchmarks and milestones for those seasons if we're lucky enough to get there." In September 2018, AMC CEO Josh Sapan further clarified Alpert's statement, saying the network plan on continuing The Walking Dead as a franchise for another 10 years, including new films and television series based on the original comic book series.

AMC confirmed in September 2020 that the series would conclude with the eleventh season, covering 24 episodes over a two-year broadcast period, at the same time as announcing a spinoff series involving the characters Daryl and Carol, set to start airing in 2023. In April 2022, the project was retooled to be entirely Daryl-focused, and McBride departed the project. The series is set and to be filmed in Europe in mid-2022, which would make it logistically untenable for McBride.

=== Filming ===
In March 2020, it was reported that pre-production had been halted and that filming would be delayed three to four weeks also due to the COVID-19 pandemic. Filming for the final season began in February 2021 and was completed in March 2022. The series moved from shooting on 16 mm film to digital beginning with the six bonus episodes from season 10. This change was prompted due to the COVID-19 pandemic and safety precautions with there being fewer "touch points" with digital than film. Showrunner Angela Kang stated they would use post-production techniques to maintain the look of the series. During filming in March 2022, Norman Reedus suffered from a concussion on set, which pushed back filming of the show's final episode.

=== Casting ===
In October 2019, Lauren Cohan was confirmed to be returning to the series as Maggie, after being absent since early in the ninth season. Cohan officially returned to the series near the end of the tenth season. In July 2020, Margot Bingham was confirmed to reprise her role as Stephanie for this season; she previously appeared in season 10 in a voice-only role. In March 2021, it was announced that Michael James Shaw had been cast in the series regular role of Mercer. In April 2021, Jacob Young was cast as Deaver, a member of the Reapers. In September 2021, Jeffrey Dean Morgan's 11-year-old son, Gus Morgan, made a cameo appearance in the fifth episode as a featured walker.

== Release ==
The final season, titled "The Final Season Trilogy", premiered on August 22, 2021, on AMC and contains 24 episodes that split into three eight-episode airing blocks, with the series concluded on November 20, 2022. It also premiered a week early on August 15, 2021, on AMC+ and each episode of the season was made available a week before its broadcast date, excluding the final episode. In the UK and Ireland, the season debuted on August 23, 2021, on Disney+ via its Star hub. The first nine episodes were all released on Disney+ in Denmark via Star on February 21, 2022.

== Reception ==
=== Critical response ===
The eleventh season of The Walking Dead has received generally positive reviews from critics. On Rotten Tomatoes, the season holds a score of 80% with an average rating of 7 out of 10, based on 237 reviews. The site's critical consensus reads: "While the sense of finality is diminished by the promise of even more spinoffs, The Walking Dead's eleventh conclusion is a solid enough conclusion to an epic tale of zombies that never had a clear offramp to begin with." Paul Dailly of TV Fanatic gave the first two episodes 4.5 out of 5 stars, calling the episodes "dark, filled with stakes and nail-biting moments". Writing for Forbes, Erik Kain gave the two-part premiere a positive review and considered them "a pretty damn impressive introduction to Season 11" and that they have him "excited for what's to come". In contrast, Kirsten Acuna of Insider wrote a slightly less positive review, stating that the episodes are "decent" and "satisfying, but it doesn't feel like a big-budget premiere" that she was hoping for.

The Walking Dead season 11: Critical reception by episode
Season 11 (2021–22): Percentage of positive critics' reviews tracked by the website Rotten Tomatoes

=== Ratings ===
Viewership and ratings per episode of The Walking Dead season 11
No.	Title	Air date	Rating (18–49)	Viewers (millions)	DVR (18–49)	DVR viewers (millions)	Total (18–49)	Total viewers (millions)
1	"Acheron: Part I"	August 22, 2021	0.6	2.22	0.4	1.33	1.0	3.55
2	"Acheron: Part II"	August 29, 2021	0.5	1.99	—N/a	—N/a	—N/a	—N/a
3	"Hunted"	September 5, 2021	0.5	1.87	—N/a	—N/a	—N/a	—N/a
4	"Rendition"	September 12, 2021	0.5	1.88	—N/a	—N/a	—N/a	—N/a
5	"Out of the Ashes"	September 19, 2021	0.5	1.91	—N/a	—N/a	—N/a	—N/a
6	"On the Inside"	September 26, 2021	0.4	1.78	—N/a	—N/a	—N/a	—N/a
7	"Promises Broken"	October 3, 2021	0.5	1.89	—N/a	—N/a	—N/a	—N/a
8	"For Blood"	October 10, 2021	0.5	1.91	—N/a	—N/a	—N/a	—N/a
9	"No Other Way"	February 20, 2022	0.5	1.76	—N/a	—N/a	—N/a	—N/a
10	"New Haunts"	February 27, 2022	0.4	1.60	—N/a	—N/a	—N/a	—N/a
11	"Rogue Element"	March 6, 2022	0.4	1.67	—N/a	—N/a	—N/a	—N/a
12	"The Lucky Ones"	March 13, 2022	0.4	1.58	—N/a	—N/a	—N/a	—N/a
13	"Warlords"	March 20, 2022	0.5	1.79	—N/a	—N/a	—N/a	—N/a
14	"The Rotten Core"	March 27, 2022	0.4	1.55	—N/a	—N/a	—N/a	—N/a
15	"Trust"	April 3, 2022	0.4	1.67	0.4	1.03	0.8	2.70
16	"Acts of God"	April 10, 2022	0.4	1.61	0.3	1.05	0.7	2.66
17	"Lockdown"	October 2, 2022	0.3	1.19	0.2	0.96	0.5	2.15
18	"A New Deal"	October 9, 2022	0.3	1.35	0.3	0.89	0.6	2.24
19	"Variant"	October 16, 2022	0.3	1.36	0.3	0.99	0.6	2.35
20	"What's Been Lost"	October 23, 2022	0.3	1.36	0.3	0.92	0.6	2.28
21	"Outpost 22"	October 30, 2022	0.3	1.50	—N/a	—N/a	—N/a	—N/a
22	"Faith"	November 6, 2022	0.3	1.39	—N/a	—N/a	—N/a	—N/a
23	"Family"	November 13, 2022	0.3	1.47	—N/a	—N/a	—N/a	—N/a
24	"Rest in Peace"	November 20, 2022	0.7	2.27	—N/a	—N/a	—N/a	—N/a
