= Rendition (The Walking Dead) =

- The Walking Dead episode
- Episode no.: Season 11; Episode 4
- Directed by: Frederick E.O. Toye
- Written by: Nicole Mirante-Matthews
- Cinematography by: Scott Kevan
- Editing by: Jack Colwell
- Original air date: September 12, 2021
- Running time: 43 minutes

Guest appearances
- Ritchie Coster as Pope; Alex Meraz as Brandon Carver; Glenn Stanton as Frost; Dikran Tulaine as Mancea; Jacob Young as Deaver; Branton Box as Fisher; Laurie Fortier as Agatha; Michael Shenefelt as Bossie; Eric LeBlanc as Marcus Powell; Robert Hayes as Paul Wells; Ethan McDowell as Ira Washington; Dane Davenport as Ancheta; Zac Zedalis as Boone; Lex Lauletta as Austin

Episode chronology
← Previous "Hunted"	Next → "Out of the Ashes"
- The Walking Dead (season 11)

"Rendition" is the fourth episode of the eleventh season of the post-apocalyptic horror television series The Walking Dead. The 157th episode of the series overall, the episode was directed by Frederick E.O. Toye and written by Nicole Mirante-Matthews. "Rendition" was released on the streaming platform AMC+ on September 5, 2021, before airing on AMC on September 12, 2021.

In the episode, Daryl (Norman Reedus) reunites with Leah (Lynn Collins) while the Reapers hold him captive at their headquarters, Meridian, and torture him for information about his group. The episode received mixed reviews from critics.

== Plot ==
In the woods, Daryl flees the Reaper attack with Dog. A Reaper tries to stop him, throwing Dog down a hill, but Daryl fights them off. Another Reaper stops their companions from attacking Daryl, allowing him to escape. The following morning, Daryl finds Dog sitting next to a Reaper, who reveals herself to be Leah, Daryl's former romantic partner and Dog's former owner. Leah asks Daryl if he is with Maggie's group. Daryl lies and says he only bumped into them on the road, but Leah is unconvinced. Daryl tries to take Dog and leave, but Dog refuses to leave Leah's side as a group of Reapers surrounds them.

Daryl is taken to Meridian and tied to a chair in a shed. Daryl confides to Leah that he came back and looked everywhere for her before Leah knocks him unconscious. Daryl soon wakes up gasping for air as Reapers waterboard him for information about Maggie's group. He insists that he has no family and was only briefly part of Maggie's group. Nonetheless, they continue to torture him until Leah orders them to stop. Daryl is locked in a nearby cell, where Frost is also imprisoned. Daryl sticks to his story, pretending not to care about Maggie's group when Frost asks. Leah again orders Daryl to surrender any information lest he face the wrath of her leader, Pope. At Pope's quarters, Leah learns that another Reaper, Michael, was found dead.

Leah returns to Daryl's cell as Frost is taken away for interrogation, and confides her grief over Michael, whom she saw as a younger brother. Daryl again says that he returned to her cabin to be with her, but she wasn't there. Leah admits she still has feelings for Daryl, who says he would help her if he could and claims he is telling the truth about not being part of Maggie's group. Daryl offers vague details, claiming that a woman is leading the group with a tall skinny guy and a priest carrying a shotgun. Daryl also tells Leah that the group spoke in code around him because he was an outsider, and that they were meeting up with three dozen of their fighters. Satisfied, Leah reports back to Pope and convinces Pope to let Daryl join them.

That night, Daryl and Leah are left alone in the interrogation room, only to be locked inside; the shed is set on fire, and the room is engulfed in flames. Daryl is able to break through a window and helps Leah out of the burning room, and follows her to safety outside, where they find all of the Reapers gathered. Pope, impressed that Daryl not only escaped but saved Leah before himself, welcomes Daryl into the group. In his quarters, Pope explains how the Reapers are veterans traumatized during the War in Afghanistan. Struggling to cope with civilian life after finishing their deployment, they became mercenaries until society fell. After the fall, the politicians who hired them tried to exterminate them in a fire, but they survived, believing to be chosen by God.

Later, around a campfire, Pope accuses a reaper of abandoning Michael in battle and throws him into the open fire, holding him down until he burns to death.

== Production ==
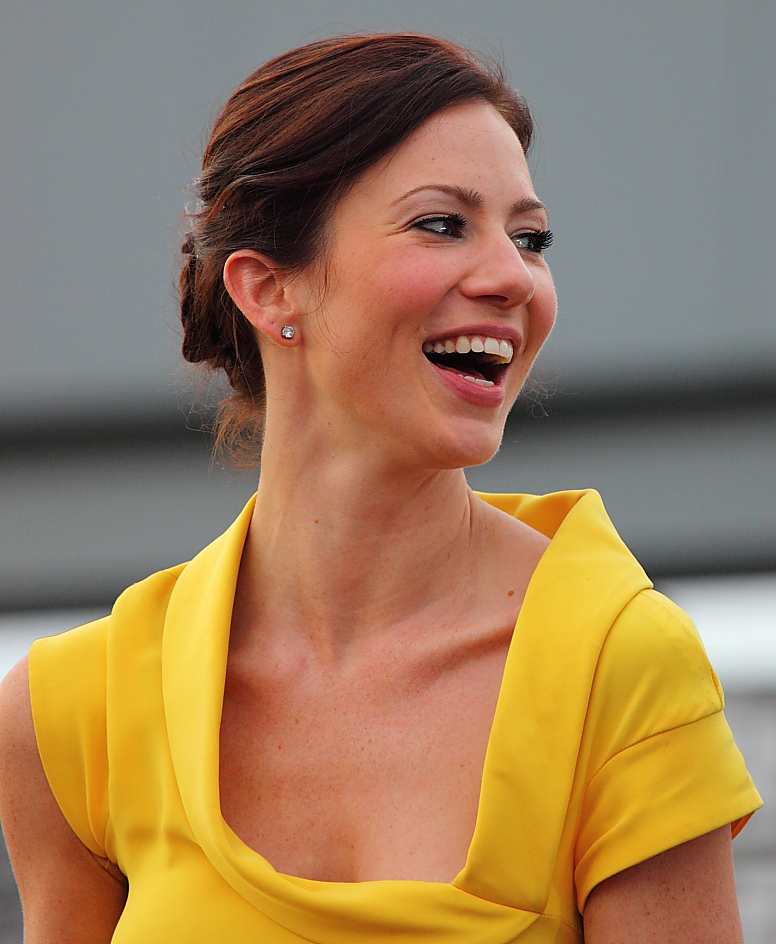
"Rendition" marks the return of Lynn Collins as Leah, who was absent since "Find Me"

The episode marks Lynn Collins' second appearance as Leah, making this her first appearance since the episode "Find Me" the previous season.

== Reception ==
=== Critical reception ===
The episode received generally mixed reviews from critics. On Rotten Tomatoes, the episode has an approval rating of 67% with an average score of 6.8 out of 10, based on 12 reviews. The site's critical consensus reads: "Daryl is an involving tour guide through The Walking Dead's final batch of antagonists, although 'Rendition' won't convince the skeptics that The Reapers are much different than the murderous militias who have plagued the series before."

Ron Hogan of Den of Geek gave the episode 4 out of 5 stars, praising Toye's direction and the performances of Reedus and Collins in their scenes together, writing that: "Nicole Mirante-Matthews walks a fine line in these moments, with Daryl and Leah pushing at one another without losing that core connection." Rob Bricken of Gizmodo praised the development of the Reapers' backstory, but expressed wariness with where the writers were going with it, saying: "I doubt The Walking Dead will define the Reapers’ religious affiliations beyond them being on a mission from 'God.' I’m much more worried about how bad the concept of the Reapers could break if the show isn’t careful with it."

Writing for Forbes, Erik Kain criticized the repetitive nature of the storyline, comparing it disfavorably to Daryl's arc with the Claimers in the show's fourth season. Kain wrote that: "What this season lacks, so far at least, is any sense of true danger or high stakes. This is the final season of the entire show, but it feels altogether safe—safe in ways the earlier seasons never felt. Whatever tension we stumble across is too contrived and predictable to matter much."

=== Ratings ===
The episode was seen by 1.88 million viewers in the United States on its original air date. It marked a slight increase in ratings from the previous episode, which had 1.87 million viewers.
