= For Blood =

- The Walking Dead episode
- Episode no.: Season 11; Episode 8
- Directed by: Sharat Raju
- Written by: Erik Mountain
- Cinematography by: Scott Kevan
- Editing by: Alan Cody
- Original air date: October 10, 2021
- Running time: 41 minutes

Guest appearances
- Kevin Carroll as Virgil; Ritchie Coster as Pope; Angel Theory as Kelly; Alex Meraz as Brandon Carver; Okea Eme-Akwari as Elijah; Kerry Cahill as Dianne; Nadine Marissa as Nabila; Branton Box as Fisher; Jacob Young as Deaver; Mandi Christine Kerr as Barbara; Anabelle Holloway as Gracie; Antony Azor as R.J. Grimes; Kien Michael Spiller as Hershel Rhee; Zac Zedalis as Boone; Eric LeBlanc as Marcus Powell; Robert Hayes as Paul Wells; Lex Lauletta as Austin; Dane Davenport as Ancheta

Episode chronology
← Previous "Promises Broken"	Next → "No Other Way"
- The Walking Dead (season 11)

"For Blood" is the eighth episode and first-part finale of the eleventh season of the post-apocalyptic horror television series The Walking Dead. The 161st episode of the series overall, the episode was directed by Sharat Raju and written by Erik Mountain. "For Blood" was released on the streaming platform AMC+ on October 3, 2021, before airing on AMC on October 10, 2021.

In the episode, Maggie (Lauren Cohan), Negan (Jeffrey Dean Morgan), and Gabriel (Seth Gilliam) lead a herd to Meridian and sneak in among the confusion, while the Reapers, led by Pope (Ritchie Coster) and joined by Daryl (Norman Reedus) and Leah (Lynn Collins), try to fend them off. At Alexandria, the survivors attempt to wait out a violent storm when part of the wall falls down, letting walkers into the community. The episode has received positive reviews from critics.

== Plot ==
Maggie, Negan, and Gabriel lead a herd of walkers to Meridian while disguised among them in masks. When the herd arrives, the lookouts at Meridian are confused by the herd's behavior. Daryl, recognizing the behavior, volunteers to lead them away. Pope instead tasks Paul with luring the walkers away. Paul starts to lead the herd away from Meridian but is ambushed on several sides and stabbed by Maggie. Paul is consumed by walkers, and Negan steals his radio. When the Reapers stop hearing from Paul they assume he is dead, which Pope reveals he assumed would happen. Leah confronts Pope, but he insists that sometimes sacrifices are necessary.

At Alexandria, the survivors shelter in one of the houses while a violent storm hits. While boarding up the windows to keep walkers and rain out, part of Alexandria's outer wall falls down, and Aaron asks for volunteers to go fix it. Connie and Kelly opt to help Aaron rebuild the wall, while Rosita stays behind to watch over the children in the house. While practicing with her weapon by the window, Gracie makes too much noise and attracts walkers to the house. Rosita runs outside and slays several walkers to buy them time, but the walkers’ numbers begin breaking down the door.

Negan and Elijah lead the herd back to Meridian's walls, which trigger landmines and explosives around the perimeter. Maggie and Gabriel break off to head inside. When they approach, Daryl kills a Reaper in secret. Maggie and Gabriel split up inside, with Gabriel climbing to the top floor of a building to defend Maggie with his rifle. She hot-wires a truck, and rams it into Meridian's front gate, allowing the herd inside the walls. Daryl meets Leah on a rooftop, and sensing her discomfort at Pope's recent decisions, invites her to run away with him. When she refuses, Daryl confesses that he is with Maggie's group, and that they were hiding among the dead horde. Despite feeling betrayed, Leah keeps his secret from Pope when he arrives on the rooftop, with a Reaper named Ancheta unveiling a hwacha.

Back at Alexandria, Rosita leads a retreat to the second floor of the house where they can pick off the walkers, however, Judith discovers Gracie hiding in the basement which is now flooding. They try to join the others only to be forced back to the flooding basement by the walkers that have now entered the house.

As the Reapers on the ground struggle to fend the walkers off, Pope orders the hwacha to be fired. Leah points out that this will also kill the Reapers on the ground, and stabs him in the throat when he won't back down; as Ancheta tries to intervene, Daryl throws a knife into his chest as Gabriel shoots another Reaper in the head to save Maggie. As Pope tries to crawl to safety, Leah finishes him off. However, she refuses Daryl's invitation to join him because of his killing of Ancheta and radios her comrades that he killed Pope. Daryl flees and joins Maggie and Negan in fighting the Reapers and walkers in the battle at the gates, only for the Reapers to pull back. Leah, having taken command of the Reapers, orders the hwacha to be fired upon the group and the horde.

== Reception ==
=== Critical reception ===
The episode received positive reviews. On review aggregator site Rotten Tomatoes, "For Blood" has a score of 82%, with an average score of 7.4 across 11 reviews. The critical consensus reads: "An early climax for The Walking Dead's final season, 'For Blood' stages a rousing confrontation against the Reaper threat – with a couple of gruesome surprises thrown into the mix."

Ron Hogan for Den of Geek gave the episode 3.5 out of 5 stars, writing that: "Both stories work well, and there’s no real break in the tension between the two. Both only turn the tension up leading to the season-pausing cliffhanger." Erik Kain for Forbes praised the episode's action, but criticized the lack of story progression in the season so far, writing that: "In the end, very little has actually happened this season so far despite eight of the 24 episodes being over and done".

=== Ratings ===
The episode was seen by 1.91 million viewers in the United States on its original air date. It marked an increase in ratings from the previous episode, which had 1.89 million viewers.
