= Promises Broken =

- The Walking Dead episode
- Episode no.: Season 11; Episode 7
- Directed by: Sharat Raju
- Written by: Julia Ruchman
- Cinematography by: Scott Kevan
- Editing by: Alan Cody
- Original air date: October 3, 2021
- Running time: 44 minutes

Guest appearances
- Ritchie Coster as Pope; Ian Anthony Dale as Tomi; Chelle Ramos as Stephanie; Okea Eme-Akwari as Elijah; Teo Rapp-Olsson as Sebastian Milton; Burke Brown as Young Father; Dikran Tulaine as Mancea; Branton Box as Fisher; Eric LeBlanc as Marcus Powell; Ethan McDowell as Ira Washington; Lex Lauletta as Austin; Dane Davenport as Ancheta; Courtney Dietz as Kayla; Jason Turner as Marcus Colvin; Liz McGeever as Young Mother; Brisco de Poalo as Nine-Year-Old Boy

Episode chronology
← Previous "On the Inside"	Next → "For Blood"
- The Walking Dead (season 11)

"Promises Broken" is the seventh episode of the eleventh season of the post-apocalyptic horror television series The Walking Dead. The 160th episode of the series overall, the episode was directed by Sharat Raju and written by Julia Ruchman. "Promises Broken" was released on the streaming platform AMC+ on September 26, 2021, before airing on AMC on October 3, 2021.

In the episode, Maggie (Lauren Cohan), Negan (Jeffrey Dean Morgan), Gabriel (Seth Gilliam) and Elijah (Okea Eme-Akwari) come up with a plan to infiltrate Meridian and take it back from the Reapers; Daryl (Norman Reedus) and Leah (Lynn Collins) come across another survivor on a scouting mission; and Eugene (Josh McDermitt), Ezekiel (Khary Payton), Princess (Paola Lázaro), and Stephanie (Chelle Ramos) work for their freedom while Yumiko (Eleanor Matsuura) tries to get a meeting with the leader of the Commonwealth. The episode was received positively by critics.

== Plot ==
Maggie, Negan, Gabriel, and Elijah, on the run from Reapers, try to think of a way to get inside Meridian. Negan insists that they should go home, but Maggie pressures the group to move forward. Negan promises to stay on the condition that he and Maggie will be even from then on, and Maggie reluctantly agrees. Maggie suggests gathering a horde of walkers to attack Meridian with, and Negan teaches the group how to blend in with the walkers and guide herds with face masks, which he learned from the Whisperers.

At the Commonwealth, Eugene, Ezekiel, and Princess clear walkers out of abandoned buildings with Stephanie as punishment for using the radio without authorization. Princess pressures Ezekiel, who is suffering from thyroid cancer, to go to the hospital. Meanwhile, Yumiko attempts to schedule a meeting with Pamela Milton, the leader of the Commonwealth, but is unable to do so due to the Commonwealth's bureaucracy. Yumiko's brother, Tomi, is happy in his new job as a baker and begs her not to tell anyone that he was a surgeon before the apocalypse, but he is suddenly seized by Commonwealth forces. Lance Hornsby tells Yumiko that if she becomes a legal counselor for Pamela Milton's cabinet, she might be able to free Tomi and her friends from community service.

Two Reapers return to Meridian and inform Pope that they couldn't find Maggie's group. Pope is infuriated, but Leah intervenes and takes the blame. Pope angrily orders Leah and Daryl to scout the area again. While walking alone, Daryl asks Leah about the Reapers' history; Leah says they took Meridian because they needed a place to stay, and that they are only hunting Maggie so she doesn't try to take revenge. Leah confides in Daryl that she sees Pope as a father figure and that his recent behavior is unusual.

When Ezekiel returns a few days later, they are given a new assignment to clear walkers along a perimeter. Eugene and Stephanie find Sebastian Milton and his girlfriend under attack by walkers; however, when they save their lives, Sebastian is ungrateful. The two argue as Stephanie kills another approaching walker, and the argument escalates when Eugene punches Sebastian for his lack of gratitude. Mercer and Lance arrive on the scene and take Eugene into custody after Sebastian accuses Eugene of attacking him. Eugene is imprisoned, and Lance orders him to give up Alexandria's location or he will stay in jail.

Daryl and Leah come across a lone survivor, who claims he is looking for supplies for his sick wife. Leah radios Pope and asks what to do, and Pope orders them to kill the survivor and his family. The survivor leads Leah and Daryl to his hideout, where his sick wife and son are. Leah tells the man to leave with his son and never return, and he obliges as Daryl mercy kills his wife. Meanwhile, in a large clearing in the forest, after gathering a large horde, Maggie and Elijah discover that Elijah's sister has died and reanimated as a member of their horde.

== Reception ==
=== Critical reception ===
The episode received positive reviews. On review aggregator site Rotten Tomatoes, "Promises Broken" has a score of 92%, with an average score of 7.1 across 12 reviews. The critical consensus reads: "This installment of The Walking Dead doesn't contain a whole lot of chomp, but it effectively entwines disparate plot threads in a way that promises a big payoff soon enough."

Ron Hogan for Den of Geek gave the episode 3 out of 5 stars, writing that: "It feels dismissive to call 'Promises Broken' a table-setting episode, but that’s what it is." Hogan praised the chemistry between Reedus and Collins, but felt that the episode was mostly set up for future episodes, and the episode by itself is only mediocre. Erik Kain for Forbes called the episode "much more grounded" than the previous episode.

=== Ratings ===
The episode was seen by 1.89 million viewers in the United States on its original air date. It marked an increase in ratings from the previous episode, which had 1.78 million viewers.
