= Hunted (The Walking Dead) =

- The Walking Dead episode
- Episode no.: Season 11; Episode 3
- Directed by: Frederick E.O. Toye
- Written by: Vivian Tse
- Cinematography by: Scott Kevan
- Editing by: Jack Colwell
- Original air date: September 5, 2021
- Running time: 42 minutes

Guest appearances
- Angel Theory as Kelly; Laurie Fortier as Agatha; Glenn Stanton as Frost; Okea Eme-Akwari as Elijah; James Devoti as Cole; Anabelle Holloway as Gracie; Antony Azor as R.J. Grimes; Kien Michael Spiller as Hershel Rhee; Marcus Lewis as Duncan; Hans Christopher as Nicholls

Episode chronology
| ← Previous "Acheron: Part II" | Next → "Rendition" |
- The Walking Dead (season 11)

"Hunted" is the third episode of the eleventh season of the post-apocalyptic horror television series The Walking Dead. The 156th episode of the series overall, the episode was directed by Frederick E.O. Toye and written by Vivian Tse. "Hunted" was released on the streaming platform AMC+ on August 29, 2021, before airing on AMC on September 5, 2021.

The episode continues where the previous episode left off, the separated scavenging party struggles to link up after getting attacked by the Reapers. Together, Maggie (Lauren Cohan) and Negan (Jeffrey Dean Morgan) tend to a wounded Alden (Callan McAuliffe) while continuing on their way to Meridian. Meanwhile, at Alexandria, Carol (Melissa McBride) leads a group to find some of the community's horses that have escaped. The episode received mixed reviews from critics.

== Plot ==
As the Reapers ambush the scavenging team in the woods, Cole is cornered and killed by a Reaper after getting his throat slit, while Duncan, Gabriel, and Negan are wounded in the process; the group scatters. The following day, Maggie continues to be hunted by two Reapers, but later joins up with Negan and Alden in an abandoned department store. There, Maggie and Negan fend off Reapers, killing one together and begin escorting a badly injured Alden to safety. The trio continues on and reunites with Duncan and Agatha as the former is dying from his wounds; Duncan implores Maggie to get Agatha home safe before dying and being put down by Maggie.

Meanwhile, outside of Alexandria, Carol, Rosita, Magna, and Kelly retrieve some of the community's escaped horses. Though many of the horses have been killed by walkers, the group finds four surviving horses and secure them at an abandoned farm.

By evening, Gabriel has recovered from an injury inflicted during the attack and finds a mortally wounded Reaper. The man (Hans Christopher) asks Gabriel to pray with him, insisting that he should pray for his enemies, saying that he thought Gabriel "was a man of God," but Gabriel says "God isn't here anymore" and executes him. Across the forest, Negan's group then continues into the woods, only for Agatha to be bitten by a walker. As she is quickly overwhelmed and devoured, Agatha orders Maggie to move on without her; Maggie is dragged away by Negan when she refuses to leave.

Carol and her group bring the four horses back to Alexandria; the retrieval of the animals brings a sense of hope to the community. However, Carol is forced to slaughter one of them to provide food for the starving people. Tension also continues to grow between Carol and Magna, and Magna believes that they should tell Kelly that Connie is dead, despite neither knowing if she's alive or not.

Taking shelter in a church with Negan and Alden, Maggie remains determined to retrieve supplies from the supply depot in Arbor Hills. Alden insists he is too injured to continue and requests to be left behind; Negan implores Maggie to make the call, but she defiantly blames him for the fall of the Hilltop. However, Negan is undeterred and insists Maggie needs to decide what to do nonetheless. She ultimately agrees to obey Alden's wishes; she continues on with Negan, though she quickly becomes uncomfortable when Negan kills a walker with a crowbar in a similar fashion to how he killed Glenn.

== Reception ==
=== Critical reception ===
The episode received generally mixed reviews from critics. On Rotten Tomatoes, the episode has an approval rating of 54% with an average score of 6.7 out of 10, based on 13 reviews. The site's critical consensus reads: "While the simmering grudge between Maggie and Negan continues to provide tension, 'Hunted' finds The Walking Dead stumbling with choppy pacing and cheap storytelling shortcuts."

Ron Hogan of Den of Geek gave the episode 4 out of 5 stars, writing: "As far as cold openings go, this one runs hot, and while it burns itself out quickly, it's a perfect set-up for the following episode, which features The Walking Dead in hunting mode for both the A plot and the B plot." Erik Kain of Forbes called the episode "weak", writing: "The opening two were better (though better still as one long episode) but when you stand all three next to each other, it's a pretty shaky start to The Walking Dead's final season that does little to make me optimistic for what comes next."

Writing for The A.V. Club, Alex McLevy gave the episode a grade of "B−", writing "The merits of this episode begin and end with Maggie and Negan's arc," and that, "Unfortunately, 'Hunted' is also structured like a very typical episode, meaning there are B-plots and C-plots to which we keep cutting back, neither of which is handled terribly gracefully".

=== Ratings ===
The episode was seen by 1.87 million viewers in the United States on its original air date. It marked a decrease in ratings from the previous episode.
