= Out of the Ashes (The Walking Dead) =

- The Walking Dead episode
- Episode no.: Season 11; Episode 5
- Directed by: Greg Nicotero
- Written by: LaToya Morgan
- Cinematography by: Duane Charles Manwiller
- Editing by: Tiffany Melvin
- Original air date: September 19, 2021
- Running time: 45 minutes

Guest appearances
- Ian Anthony Dale as Tomi; Okea Eme-Akwari as Elijah; Chelle Ramos as Shira; Brad Fleischer as Keith; Jesse C. Boyd as Edward; Anabelle Holloway as Gracie; Antony Azor as R.J. Grimes; Kien Michael Spiller as Hershel Rhee; Pilot Bunch as Vincent; Matt Mercurio as Charles; Rebecca Ray as Elaine; Ryan Vo as Commonwealth Paper-Pusher; Franco Barberis as John

Episode chronology
← Previous "Rendition"	Next → "On the Inside"
- The Walking Dead (season 11)

"Out of the Ashes" is the fifth episode of the eleventh season of the post-apocalyptic horror television series The Walking Dead. The 158th episode of the series overall, the episode was directed by executive producer Greg Nicotero and written by LaToya Morgan. "Out of the Ashes" was released on the streaming platform AMC+ on September 12, 2021, before airing on AMC on September 19, 2021.

In the episode, Aaron (Ross Marquand), Carol (Melissa McBride), Lydia (Cassady McClincy), and Jerry (Cooper Andrews) interrogate a Whisperer left behind in Hilltop's destruction; Maggie (Lauren Cohan) and Negan (Jeffrey Dean Morgan) wait at the satellite outpost for the others to regroup; Eugene (Josh McDermitt), Ezekiel (Khary Payton), Princess (Paola Lázaro), and Yumiko (Eleanor Matsuura) are accepted into the Commonwealth, as Yumiko reunites with her brother. The episode received positive reviews from critics.

== Plot ==
At the Commonwealth, Eugene, Ezekiel, Princess, and Yumiko watch an introductory video on VHS and are given their job assignments and housing information. Eugene worries that the Commonwealth intends for them to live there permanently, while they would like to get back to their own group at Alexandria. Yumiko is overjoyed to be reunited with her brother at a local bakery.

After Alexandria's wall is compromised and walkers breach the community before being quickly killed, Aaron, Carol, Lydia, and Jerry leave for the Hilltop, and upon arriving scavenge through the rubble left behind from the Whisperers' attack. Lydia notices walkers in the distance circling the way Whisperers used to herd them. When they investigate, they find one Whisperer still alive, who insists that he's the only one left, but Aaron is unconvinced.

At the satellite outpost, Maggie and Negan arrive to find that nobody else regrouped there. Maggie promises that the rest of them will come in time. Negan is skeptical, but Maggie convinces him to wait until sundown to be sure. Later, as Negan prepares to give up and go home, Maggie aggressively stops him, before Gabriel arrives with Elijah. They decide to wait for Daryl and Frost to regroup with them.

Meanwhile in Alexandria, Judith has been teaching the children how to protect themselves with weapons when she spots some local teenagers provoking the walkers through a hole in the wall. Judith runs over to stop them, but they refuse to listen to her. Later, in a house, Judith finds the handprints Carl made with her on the deck broken, and immediately suspects the teenagers, though they deny it. Judith confides in Rosita about how she feels like everyone is leaving her, but Rosita tells her not to worry, offering to help her put the broken pieces of the deck back together.

When Aaron's group takes the captured Whisperer to the Hilltop dungeons, they find several other people hiding. The Whisperer lunges at Aaron with a knife, allowing the other people to escape. Aaron and Jerry violently interrogate the Whisperer and threaten him with a walker, eventually letting him get bit by it, until Carol kills the walker. She begs Aaron not to follow vengeance the way she did during the Whisperer War. Aaron amputates the Whisperer's arm, saving his life, before the Whisperer reveals that Connie is still alive.

Back at the commonwealth, Eugene tells Stephanie that he'd like to radio back to his group at home, but Stephanie reveals that the radios are government property and that getting authorization to use them is a long and complicated process. They come up with a plan to gain access to the radios secretly, but shortly after making contact with Rosita, they are cut off and arrested. Eugene, Princess and Ezekiel are threatened with deportation from the Commonwealth, but Stephanie calls in a favor to save them.

== Reception ==
=== Critical reception ===
The episode received positive reviews from critics. On review aggregator site Rotten Tomatoes, "Out of the Ashes" has a score of 75% with an average score of 7.5 out of 10, based on 12 reviews. The site's critical consensus reads: "The Commonwealth gets explored and proves too good to be true while 'Out of the Ashes' is a believably fine table-setting installment, befitting a season that has been more solid than gutsy so far."

Writing for Forbes, Erik Kain criticized the episode's pacing, writing of the season thus far: "The whole thing is just a little dull when you come right down to it. A little dull, a little uneven, and shockingly slow-paced for the final season of The Walking Dead." Alex McLevy for The A.V. Club rated the episode a B−, praising the Commonwealth storyline, calling it "an intriguing new world to explore". However, McLevy criticized the repetitive nature of Maggie and Negan's strained relationship, writing that: "The tension makes sense—Maggie’s never going to forgive Negan, and understandably so—but that doesn’t mean it’s fun to watch them hash out the same conflict, episode after episode."

Ron Hogan for Den of Geek gave the episode 3.5 out of 5 stars. McLevy praised Nicotero's direction, writing: "One of the best things to say for Greg Nicotero as a director is that he always seems to understand the assignment", and continuing with "Nicotero’s greatest strength still lies in his sense of the visual."

=== Ratings ===
The episode was seen by 1.91 million viewers in the United States on its original air date. It marked a slight increase in ratings from the previous episode, which had 1.88 million viewers.
