= Dikran Tulaine =

English-Armenian actor

- Born: John Dikran Utidjian; 23 June 1956 (age 70); London, England
- Occupation: Actor

Dikran Tulaine (born John Dikran Utidjian; 23 June 1956) is an English-Armenian actor, storyteller and playwright. He had a recurring guest role of Max on the NBC series The Blacklist (2013–2021), and was in the films G.I. Joe: Retaliation (2013), Black Knight (2001) and Seeking Justice (2011). Recently, he had a guest role as Mancea in the final season of AMC's The Walking Dead.

== Early life ==
Born John Dikran Utidjian in London, Dikran grew up in the Middle East, the Caribbean and the United States as his family followed his father's medical career. After having spent his teen years in Pittsburgh, Pennsylvania, he returned to London in the mid-1970s to pursue his interests and go to drama school. In 1976, he was lead vocalist for one gig only with the Camden Town ska band Madness when they first formed as The North London Invaders. At this time, he took the stage name Tulaine when he registered with Equity.

== Career ==
Tulaine worked in the British theatre and television during the 1980s, at times touring in Paris, Croatia, Greece and the United States.

In 1982, Tulaine worked at the Citizens Theatre in Glasgow, Scotland. In 1983, he appeared as part of the Second Company in all three parts of Shakespeare's Henry VI, as part of BBC Television Shakespeare, a series of the complete works as known at the time.

In 1985 and 1986, he performed at the Royal National Theatre as part of the McKellen-Petherbridge Group, founded by Ian McKellen and Edward Petherbridge. As part of the group, he appeared in Chekov's The Cherry Orchard, Sheridan's The Critic, and Webster's The Duchess of Malfi in repertory.

In the early 1990s, Tulaine relocated to Atlanta, Georgia, in the US to work with the Atlanta Shakespeare Company, where he stayed for about 8 years, acting and directing. In the early 1980s, Tulaine began acting in film and television, and eventually he moved to New York City, New York, to increase his career opportunities. Besides working in film, he continues to be active in theater and as a performance artist.

Margaret Jefferson quotes Tulaine on morality in her 2004 review of Brecht's Mother Courage and Her Children.

America, it shouldn't be forgotten, is a country founded by Puritans. Although a lot of this morality was outdated when it was first enforced, a curtain of morality still hangs over this country. It's a chain on the American Psyche. There's this idea here that all archetypes have to fulfill an absolutely ludicrous moral code.

In 2008 he played the role of Sergei Kubichek in "The Librarian: Curse of the Judas Chalice".

Tulaine also does voice-over work and reads for audiobooks, releasing The Iliad in 2012 and Drinking Midnight Wine in 2013.

In 2015 he played the role of Lech Choinski in "Payback" the 20th episode of the 5th season of the CBS crime drama Blue Bloods.

In late 2021 and early 2022, he guest starred in The Walking Dead as Mancea, the religious member of the Reapers.

== Works ==
In April 2014, Tulaine's Shakespeare adaptation Antonio & Shylock: Monsters opened at Stage Left Studio in New York City. It was well received by critics.

- Antonio & Shylock: Monsters (2014)
- Mask of Apollo
- Shylock
- Wild and Terrible Majesty (2014)
- Seeking Justice (2011)
