= Alex Meraz =

American-Mexican actor

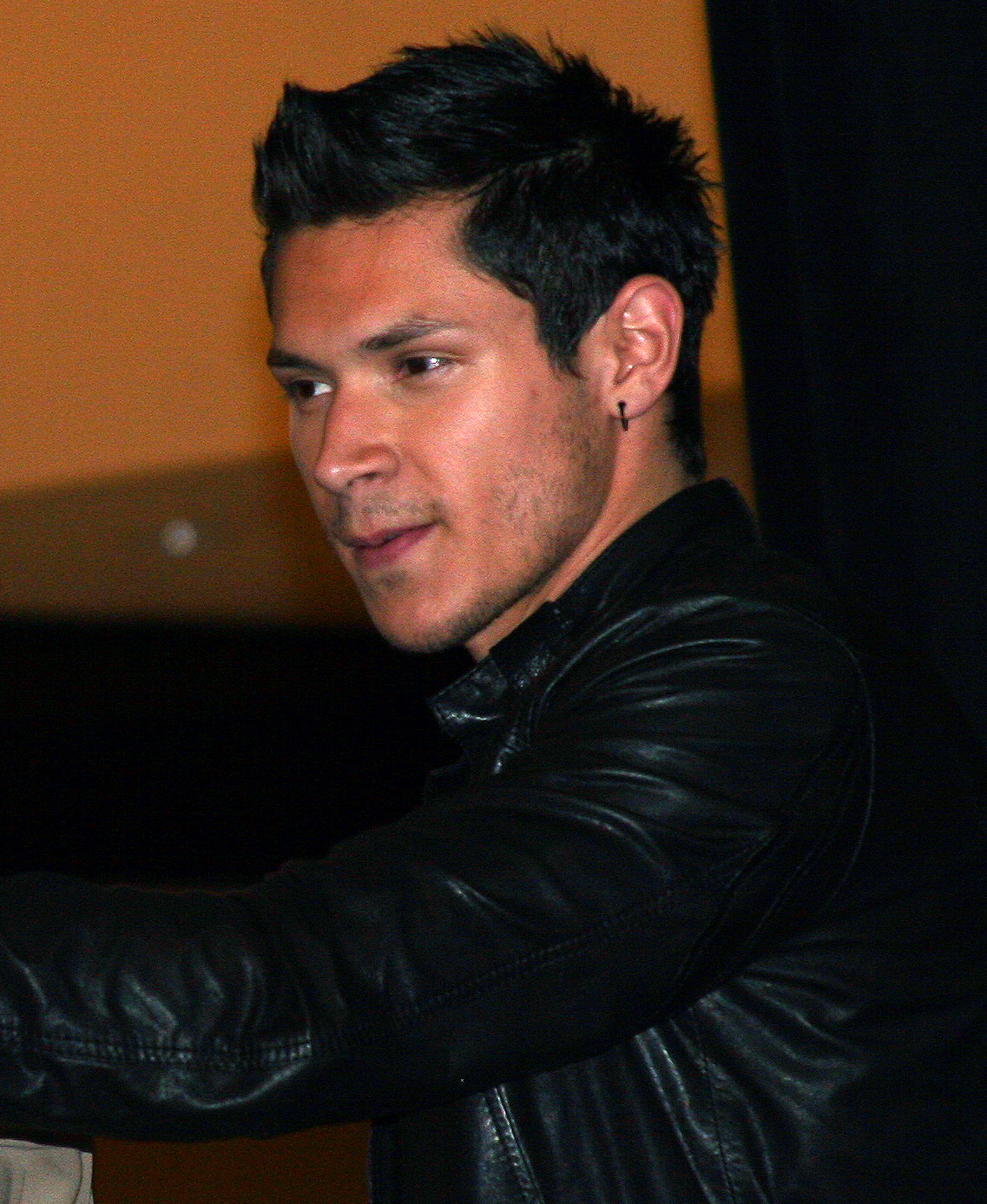
- Meraz at a Twilight Saga: New Moon promotional appearance in Houston, Texas, November 10, 2009
- Born: Alejandro Meraz; January 10, 1985 (age 41); Mesa, Arizona, U.S.
- Citizenship: United States; Mexico
- Occupations: Actor, dancer, martial artist
- Years active: 2005–present
- Spouse: Kim (m. 2007)
- Children: 2

Alejandro "Alex" Meraz (born January 10, 1985) is an American-Mexican actor and martial artist. He is best known for playing the werewolf named Paul Lahote in the film New Moon and Border Patrol agent Ivan Muños in Dark Winds.

== Life and career ==
Meraz was born in Mesa, Arizona, and is of Purépecha descent. As a child, his family would visit his relatives in Santa Maria Ostula, Michoacán, Mexico. He attended the New School for the Arts and studied painting and illustration. Alex was active in break-dancing circles in the early 2000s, under the name "Nomak". He also performed with Indigenous contemporary dancing companies, specifically with choreographers Santee Smith (Mohawk), Rulan Tangen, and Raoul Trujillo. In 2001, he moved to San Francisco and joined the then-newly established Dancing Earth company, directed by Tangen. He later toured with Smith's Kaha:wi Dance Theatre in Canada and was nominated for a Dora Mavor Moore Award, a Canadian award for theatre, dance and opera.

Alex has studied mixed martial arts, winning tournaments in karate and the martial art of capoeira. Alex's first big film was The New World as one of the Powhatan core warriors, inspiring him to continue acting. His next break came when he was cast as werewolf Paul Lahote in the film New Moon. Alex has been in CSI: New York., Single Ladies, The Walking Dead, Suicide Squad, and Landman.

== Personal life ==
On December 31, 2007, Alex married Kim. A Twilight fan, she suggested that he audition for New Moon, believing he was perfect for the part. They have a son, for whom his mentor, actor Raoul Trujillo, is the godfather. In June 2012, the couple had another son.

== Filmography ==
=== Film ===
Year	Title	Role	Notes
2005	The New World	Core Warrior	
2007	Two Spirits, One Journey	Luke	Short film
2009	The Twilight Saga: New Moon	Paul Lahote	
2010	The Twilight Saga: Eclipse	Paul Lahote	
2011	The Roommate	Frat Boy	
2011	Never Back Down 2: The Beatdown	Zack	
2011	The Twilight Saga: Breaking Dawn – Part 1	Paul Lahote	
2012	Mine Games	TJ	
2012	186 Dollars to Freedom	Nicaragua	
2012	The Twilight Saga: Breaking Dawn – Part 2	Paul Lahote	
2012	The Reward	Renegade Cop	Short film
2014	Cry Now	Eric	
2015	Bone Tomahawk	Eagle Skulls	
2016	The Bronx Bull	Paco	
2016	Suicide Squad	Gomez	
2017	Bright	Serafin	
2020	Bad Dad	Alex	
2021	The Last Son	Patty	
2021	Primordial Man	The Primordial Man	Short film
TBA	Subversion		Post-production

=== Television ===
Year	Title	Role	Notes
2007	Dancing with Spirit	Dancer	Episode: "Here on Earth"
2009	American Experience	Warrior	Episode: "We Shall Remain: Part II - Tecumseh's Vision"
2009	Freedom Riders	Warrior	Unknown episodes
2011	CSI: NY	Odelin Gonzales Jr.	Episode: "Food for Thought"
2013	The Glades	Moses Clearwater	Episode: "Happy Trails"
2013	Big Thunder	Hosa	Television film
2014	Single Ladies	Sergio	Recurring role; 2 episodes
2014	New Worlds	Masca	Television mini-series
2017	Animal Kingdom	Javi Cano	Recurring role; 6 episodes
2017	Scalped	Dashiell Dash Bad Horse	Television film
2021–2022	The Walking Dead	Brandon Carver	Recurring role; 4 episodes
2024	American Sports Story	Carlos 'Charlie Boy' Ortiz'	8 episodes
2024	Landman	Jimenez	4 episodes
2025	Dark Winds	Ivan Muños	4 episodes
