= Angel Theory =

American actress

- Born: Far Rockaway, Queens, New York U.S.
- Occupations: Actress; Choreographer; Dancer
- Years active: 2001–present
- Known for: The Walking Dead (2018–2022)
- Family: Anna Simpson (mother)

Angel Theory is an American actress, known for playing Kelly on the series The Walking Dead. She is also a dancer and choreographer.

== Life and career ==
Theory was born in Far Rockaway, Queens, New York. Her mother is Anna Simpson. Theory trained as a dancer in multiple styles of dance at the Broadway Dance Center, EXPG studios and Peridance Studios. She performed in the music videos for Wish You Were Mine by Phillip George and Stranger To Love by Charles Perry.

After a car crash, she began experiencing hearing loss at age 14. Her hearing loss progressively worsened as she got older. Theory told Insider, "I remember how depressed, devastated, and angry I got with myself after my hearing loss. My mom told me, 'It's not a disability, it's your damn superpower.'"

For the television series The Walking Dead, she applied for the role of Connie. Showrunner Angela Kang told Insider they were "so compelled by Angel," she was cast as Connie's sister, Kelly. Kang also told Insider that with Theory's agreement, her progressive hearing loss has been incorporated into the plot of The Walking Dead, including the line of encouragement from her mother. Theory has also been teaching American Sign Language (ASL) to the cast of The Walking Dead.

Theory also stars as Olivia, a hard of hearing/deaf teacher, in the series Kinderfanger, and is an executive producer. In her role as co-executive producer, Theory has been able to advise the show creators about realistic representation of Hard of Hearing or Deaf people.

== Filmography ==
Television roles
Year	Title	Role	Notes	Ref(s)
2018–2022	The Walking Dead	Kelly	Recurring (seasons 9–10), main (Season 11); 34 episodes	
2020–2021	Kinderfanger	Olivia	Also executive producer	
2020	"I Dare You"	Music video	Music video by Kelly Clarkson	
2020	Zoey's Extraordinary Playlist	Deaf Dorm Dancer	Uncredited	
