= List of The Walking Dead episodes =

The Walking Dead is an American post-apocalyptic television series based on the comic book of the same name by Robert Kirkman, Tony Moore and Charlie Adlard, and developed for television by Frank Darabont. It premiered on the cable network AMC on October 31, 2010. The series focuses on Rick Grimes, a sheriff's deputy who slips into a coma after being shot. He awakens to find himself in a dangerous new world that has been overrun by "walkers". He joins a group of survivors (including his wife and son) as they try to survive in a world among the undead.

In October 2019, the series was renewed for an eleventh season. In September 2020, AMC confirmed that the eleventh season would be the series' last and would consist of 24 episodes broadcast from 2021 to 2022. The eleventh season premiered on August 22, 2021. During the course of the series, 177 episodes of The Walking Dead aired over eleven seasons, between October 31, 2010, and November 20, 2022.

== Series overview ==
Season	Episodes	Originally released	
Season	Episodes	First released	Last released
1	6	October 31, 2010	December 5, 2010
2	13	October 16, 2011	March 18, 2012
3	16	October 14, 2012	March 31, 2013
4	16	October 13, 2013	March 30, 2014
5	16	October 12, 2014	March 29, 2015
6	16	October 11, 2015	April 3, 2016
7	16	October 23, 2016	April 2, 2017
8	16	October 22, 2017	April 15, 2018
9	16	October 7, 2018	March 31, 2019
10	22	October 6, 2019	April 4, 2021
11	24	August 22, 2021	November 20, 2022

== Episodes ==
=== Season 1 (2010) ===
No. overall	No. in season	Title	Directed by	Written by	Original release date	U.S. viewers (millions)
1	1	"Days Gone Bye"	Frank Darabont	Teleplay by : Frank Darabont	October 31, 2010	5.35
2	2	"Guts"	Michelle MacLaren	Frank Darabont	November 7, 2010	4.71
3	3	"Tell It to the Frogs"	Gwyneth Horder-Payton	Story by : Charles H. Eglee & Jack LoGiudice; Teleplay by : Charles H. Eglee & Jack LoGiudice and Frank Darabont	November 14, 2010	5.07
4	4	"Vatos"	Johan Renck	Robert Kirkman	November 21, 2010	4.75
5	5	"Wildfire"	Ernest Dickerson	Glen Mazzara	November 28, 2010	5.56
6	6	"TS-19"	Guy Ferland	Adam Fierro and Frank Darabont	December 5, 2010	5.97

=== Season 2 (2011–12) ===
No. overall	No. in season	Title	Directed by	Written by	Original release date	U.S. viewers (millions)
7	1	"What Lies Ahead"	Ernest Dickerson; Gwyneth Horder-Payton	Ardeth Bey and Robert Kirkman	October 16, 2011	7.26
8	2	"Bloodletting"	Ernest Dickerson	Glen Mazzara	October 23, 2011	6.70
9	3	"Save the Last One"	Phil Abraham	Scott M. Gimple	October 30, 2011	6.10
10	4	"Cherokee Rose"	Billy Gierhart	Evan Reilly	November 6, 2011	6.29
11	5	"Chupacabra"	Guy Ferland	David Leslie Johnson	November 13, 2011	6.12
12	6	"Secrets"	David Boyd	Angela Kang	November 20, 2011	6.08
13	7	"Pretty Much Dead Already"	Michelle MacLaren	Scott M. Gimple	November 27, 2011	6.62
14	8	"Nebraska"	Clark Johnson	Evan Reilly	February 12, 2012	8.10
15	9	"Triggerfinger"	Billy Gierhart	David Leslie Johnson	February 19, 2012	6.89
16	10	"18 Miles Out"	Ernest Dickerson	Scott M. Gimple & Glen Mazzara	February 26, 2012	7.04
17	11	"Judge, Jury, Executioner"	Greg Nicotero	Angela Kang	March 4, 2012	6.77
18	12	"Better Angels"	Guy Ferland	Evan Reilly & Glen Mazzara	March 11, 2012	6.89
19	13	"Beside the Dying Fire"	Ernest Dickerson	Robert Kirkman & Glen Mazzara	March 18, 2012	8.99

=== Season 3 (2012–13) ===
No. overall	No. in season	Title	Directed by	Written by	Original release date	U.S. viewers (millions)
20	1	"Seed"	Ernest Dickerson	Glen Mazzara	October 14, 2012	10.87
21	2	"Sick"	Billy Gierhart	Nichole Beattie	October 21, 2012	9.55
22	3	"Walk with Me"	Guy Ferland	Evan Reilly	October 28, 2012	10.51
23	4	"Killer Within"	Guy Ferland	Sang Kyu Kim	November 4, 2012	9.27
24	5	"Say the Word"	Greg Nicotero	Angela Kang	November 11, 2012	10.37
25	6	"Hounded"	Dan Attias	Scott M. Gimple	November 18, 2012	9.21
26	7	"When the Dead Come Knocking"	Dan Sackheim	Frank Renzulli	November 25, 2012	10.43
27	8	"Made to Suffer"	Billy Gierhart	Robert Kirkman	December 2, 2012	10.48
28	9	"The Suicide King"	Lesli Linka Glatter	Evan Reilly	February 10, 2013	12.26
29	10	"Home"	Seith Mann	Nichole Beattie	February 17, 2013	11.05
30	11	"I Ain't a Judas"	Greg Nicotero	Angela Kang	February 24, 2013	11.01
31	12	"Clear"	Tricia Brock	Scott M. Gimple	March 3, 2013	11.30
32	13	"Arrow on the Doorpost"	David Boyd	Ryan C. Coleman	March 10, 2013	11.46
33	14	"Prey"	Stefan Schwartz	Glen Mazzara & Evan Reilly	March 17, 2013	10.84
34	15	"This Sorrowful Life"	Greg Nicotero	Scott M. Gimple	March 24, 2013	10.99
35	16	"Welcome to the Tombs"	Ernest Dickerson	Glen Mazzara	March 31, 2013	12.42

=== Season 4 (2013–14) ===
No. overall	No. in season	Title	Directed by	Written by	Original release date	U.S. viewers (millions)
36	1	"30 Days Without an Accident"	Greg Nicotero	Scott M. Gimple	October 13, 2013	16.11
37	2	"Infected"	Guy Ferland	Angela Kang	October 20, 2013	13.95
38	3	"Isolation"	Dan Sackheim	Robert Kirkman	October 27, 2013	12.92
39	4	"Indifference"	Tricia Brock	Matthew Negrete	November 3, 2013	13.31
40	5	"Internment"	David Boyd	Channing Powell	November 10, 2013	12.20
41	6	"Live Bait"	Michael Uppendahl	Nichole Beattie	November 17, 2013	12.00
42	7	"Dead Weight"	Jeremy Podeswa	Curtis Gwinn	November 24, 2013	11.29
43	8	"Too Far Gone"	Ernest Dickerson	Seth Hoffman	December 1, 2013	12.05
44	9	"After"	Greg Nicotero	Robert Kirkman	February 9, 2014	15.76
45	10	"Inmates"	Tricia Brock	Matthew Negrete & Channing Powell	February 16, 2014	13.34
46	11	"Claimed"	Seith Mann	Nichole Beattie & Seth Hoffman	February 23, 2014	13.12
47	12	"Still"	Julius Ramsay	Angela Kang	March 2, 2014	12.61
48	13	"Alone"	Ernest Dickerson	Curtis Gwinn	March 9, 2014	12.65
49	14	"The Grove"	Michael E. Satrazemis	Scott M. Gimple	March 16, 2014	12.87
50	15	"Us"	Greg Nicotero	Nichole Beattie & Seth Hoffman	March 23, 2014	13.47
51	16	"A"	Michelle MacLaren	Scott M. Gimple & Angela Kang	March 30, 2014	15.68

=== Season 5 (2014–15) ===
No. overall	No. in season	Title	Directed by	Written by	Original release date	U.S. viewers (millions)
52	1	"No Sanctuary"	Greg Nicotero	Scott M. Gimple	October 12, 2014	17.29
53	2	"Strangers"	David Boyd	Robert Kirkman	October 19, 2014	15.14
54	3	"Four Walls and a Roof"	Jeffrey F. January	Angela Kang & Corey Reed	October 26, 2014	13.80
55	4	"Slabtown"	Michael E. Satrazemis	Matthew Negrete & Channing Powell	November 2, 2014	14.52
56	5	"Self Help"	Ernest Dickerson	Heather Bellson & Seth Hoffman	November 9, 2014	13.53
57	6	"Consumed"	Seith Mann	Matthew Negrete & Corey Reed	November 16, 2014	14.07
58	7	"Crossed"	Billy Gierhart	Seth Hoffman	November 23, 2014	13.33
59	8	"Coda"	Ernest Dickerson	Angela Kang	November 30, 2014	14.81
60	9	"What Happened and What's Going On"	Greg Nicotero	Scott M. Gimple	February 8, 2015	15.64
61	10	"Them"	Julius Ramsay	Heather Bellson	February 15, 2015	12.27
62	11	"The Distance"	Larysa Kondracki	Seth Hoffman	February 22, 2015	13.44
63	12	"Remember"	Greg Nicotero	Channing Powell	March 1, 2015	14.43
64	13	"Forget"	David Boyd	Corey Reed	March 8, 2015	14.53
65	14	"Spend"	Jennifer Lynch	Matthew Negrete	March 15, 2015	13.78
66	15	"Try"	Michael E. Satrazemis	Angela Kang	March 22, 2015	13.76
67	16	"Conquer"	Greg Nicotero	Scott M. Gimple & Seth Hoffman	March 29, 2015	15.78

=== Season 6 (2015–16) ===
No. overall	No. in season	Title	Directed by	Written by	Original release date	U.S. viewers (millions)
68	1	"First Time Again"	Greg Nicotero	Scott M. Gimple & Matthew Negrete	October 11, 2015	14.63
69	2	"JSS"	Jennifer Lynch	Seth Hoffman	October 18, 2015	12.18
70	3	"Thank You"	Michael Slovis	Angela Kang	October 25, 2015	13.14
71	4	"Here's Not Here"	Stephen Williams	Scott M. Gimple	November 1, 2015	13.34
72	5	"Now"	Avi Youabian	Corey Reed	November 8, 2015	12.44
73	6	"Always Accountable"	Jeffrey F. January	Heather Bellson	November 15, 2015	12.87
74	7	"Heads Up"	David Boyd	Channing Powell	November 22, 2015	13.22
75	8	"Start to Finish"	Michael E. Satrazemis	Matthew Negrete	November 29, 2015	13.98
76	9	"No Way Out"	Greg Nicotero	Seth Hoffman	February 14, 2016	13.74
77	10	"The Next World"	Kari Skogland	Angela Kang & Corey Reed	February 21, 2016	13.48
78	11	"Knots Untie"	Michael E. Satrazemis	Matthew Negrete & Channing Powell	February 28, 2016	12.79
79	12	"Not Tomorrow Yet"	Greg Nicotero	Seth Hoffman	March 6, 2016	12.82
80	13	"The Same Boat"	Billy Gierhart	Angela Kang	March 13, 2016	12.53
81	14	"Twice as Far"	Alrick Riley	Matthew Negrete	March 20, 2016	12.69
82	15	"East"	Michael E. Satrazemis	Story by : Scott M. Gimple & Channing Powell; Teleplay by : Channing Powell	March 27, 2016	12.38
83	16	"Last Day on Earth"	Greg Nicotero	Scott M. Gimple & Matthew Negrete	April 3, 2016	14.19

=== Season 7 (2016–17) ===
No. overall	No. in season	Title	Directed by	Written by	Original release date	U.S. viewers (millions)
84	1	"The Day Will Come When You Won't Be"	Greg Nicotero	Scott M. Gimple	October 23, 2016	17.03
85	2	"The Well"	Greg Nicotero	Matthew Negrete	October 30, 2016	12.46
86	3	"The Cell"	Alrick Riley	Angela Kang	November 6, 2016	11.72
87	4	"Service"	David Boyd	Corey Reed	November 13, 2016	11.40
88	5	"Go Getters"	Darnell Martin	Channing Powell	November 20, 2016	11.00
89	6	"Swear"	Michael E. Satrazemis	David Leslie Johnson	November 27, 2016	10.40
90	7	"Sing Me a Song"	Rosemary Rodriguez	Angela Kang & Corey Reed	December 4, 2016	10.48
91	8	"Hearts Still Beating"	Michael E. Satrazemis	Matthew Negrete & Channing Powell	December 11, 2016	10.58
92	9	"Rock in the Road"	Greg Nicotero	Angela Kang	February 12, 2017	12.00
93	10	"New Best Friends"	Jeffrey F. January	Channing Powell	February 19, 2017	11.08
94	11	"Hostiles and Calamities"	Kari Skogland	David Leslie Johnson	February 26, 2017	10.42
95	12	"Say Yes"	Greg Nicotero	Matthew Negrete	March 5, 2017	10.16
96	13	"Bury Me Here"	Alrick Riley	Scott M. Gimple	March 12, 2017	10.68
97	14	"The Other Side"	Michael E. Satrazemis	Angela Kang	March 19, 2017	10.32
98	15	"Something They Need"	Michael Slovis	Corey Reed	March 26, 2017	10.54
99	16	"The First Day of the Rest of Your Life"	Greg Nicotero	Scott M. Gimple & Angela Kang & Matthew Negrete	April 2, 2017	11.31

=== Season 8 (2017–18) ===
No. overall	No. in season	Title	Directed by	Written by	Original release date	U.S. viewers (millions)
100	1	"Mercy"	Greg Nicotero	Scott M. Gimple	October 22, 2017	11.44
101	2	"The Damned"	Rosemary Rodriguez	Matthew Negrete & Channing Powell	October 29, 2017	8.92
102	3	"Monsters"	Greg Nicotero	Matthew Negrete & Channing Powell	November 5, 2017	8.52
103	4	"Some Guy"	Dan Liu	David Leslie Johnson	November 12, 2017	8.69
104	5	"The Big Scary U"	Michael E. Satrazemis	Story by : Scott M. Gimple & David Leslie Johnson & Angela Kang; Teleplay by : David Leslie Johnson & Angela Kang	November 19, 2017	7.85
105	6	"The King, the Widow, and Rick"	John Polson	Angela Kang & Corey Reed	November 26, 2017	8.28
106	7	"Time for After"	Larry Teng	Matthew Negrete & Corey Reed	December 3, 2017	7.47
107	8	"How It's Gotta Be"	Michael E. Satrazemis	David Leslie Johnson & Angela Kang	December 10, 2017	7.89
108	9	"Honor"	Greg Nicotero	Matthew Negrete & Channing Powell	February 25, 2018	8.28
109	10	"The Lost and the Plunderers"	David Boyd	Angela Kang & Channing Powell & Corey Reed	March 4, 2018	6.82
110	11	"Dead or Alive Or"	Michael E. Satrazemis	Eddie Guzelian	March 11, 2018	6.60
111	12	"The Key"	Greg Nicotero	Corey Reed & Channing Powell	March 18, 2018	6.66
112	13	"Do Not Send Us Astray"	Jeffrey F. January	Angela Kang & Matthew Negrete	March 25, 2018	6.77
113	14	"Still Gotta Mean Something"	Michael E. Satrazemis	Eddie Guzelian	April 1, 2018	6.30
114	15	"Worth"	Michael Slovis	David Leslie Johnson-McGoldrick & Corey Reed	April 8, 2018	6.67
115	16	"Wrath"	Greg Nicotero	Scott M. Gimple & Angela Kang & Matthew Negrete	April 15, 2018	7.92

=== Season 9 (2018–19) ===
No. overall	No. in season	Title	Directed by	Written by	Original release date	U.S. viewers (millions)
116	1	"A New Beginning"	Greg Nicotero	Angela Kang	October 7, 2018	6.08
117	2	"The Bridge"	Daisy von Scherler Mayer	David Leslie Johnson-McGoldrick	October 14, 2018	4.95
118	3	"Warning Signs"	Dan Liu	Corey Reed	October 21, 2018	5.04
119	4	"The Obliged"	Rosemary Rodriguez	Geraldine Inoa	October 28, 2018	5.10
120	5	"What Comes After"	Greg Nicotero	Story by : Scott M. Gimple & Matthew Negrete; Teleplay by : Matthew Negrete	November 4, 2018	5.41
121	6	"Who Are You Now?"	Larry Teng	Eddie Guzelian	November 11, 2018	5.40
122	7	"Stradivarius"	Michael Cudlitz	Vivian Tse	November 18, 2018	4.79
123	8	"Evolution"	Michael E. Satrazemis	David Leslie Johnson-McGoldrick	November 25, 2018	5.09
124	9	"Adaptation"	Greg Nicotero	Corey Reed	February 10, 2019	5.16
125	10	"Omega"	David Boyd	Channing Powell	February 17, 2019	4.54
126	11	"Bounty"	Meera Menon	Matthew Negrete	February 24, 2019	4.39
127	12	"Guardians"	Michael E. Satrazemis	LaToya Morgan	March 3, 2019	4.71
128	13	"Chokepoint"	Liesl Tommy	Eddie Guzelian & David Leslie Johnson-McGoldrick	March 10, 2019	4.83
129	14	"Scars"	Millicent Shelton	Corey Reed & Vivian Tse	March 17, 2019	4.57
130	15	"The Calm Before"	Laura Belsey	Geraldine Inoa & Channing Powell	March 24, 2019	4.15
131	16	"The Storm"	Greg Nicotero	Angela Kang & Matthew Negrete	March 31, 2019	5.02

=== Season 10 (2019–21) ===
No. overall	No. in season	Title	Directed by	Written by	Original release date	U.S. viewers (millions)
132	1	"Lines We Cross"	Greg Nicotero	Angela Kang	October 6, 2019	4.00
133	2	"We Are the End of the World"	Greg Nicotero	Nicole Mirante-Matthews	October 13, 2019	3.47
134	3	"Ghosts"	David Boyd	Jim Barnes	October 20, 2019	3.48
135	4	"Silence the Whisperers"	Michael Cudlitz	Geraldine Inoa	October 27, 2019	3.31
136	5	"What It Always Is"	Laura Belsey	Eli Jorné	November 3, 2019	3.09
137	6	"Bonds"	Dan Liu	Kevin Deiboldt	November 10, 2019	3.21
138	7	"Open Your Eyes"	Michael Cudlitz	Corey Reed	November 17, 2019	3.31
139	8	"The World Before"	John Dahl	Julia Ruchman	November 24, 2019	3.21
140	9	"Squeeze"	Michael E. Satrazemis	David Leslie Johnson-McGoldrick	February 23, 2020	3.52
141	10	"Stalker"	Bronwen Hughes	Jim Barnes	March 1, 2020	3.16
142	11	"Morning Star"	Michael E. Satrazemis	Julia Ruchman & Vivian Tse	March 8, 2020	2.93
143	12	"Walk with Us"	Greg Nicotero	Eli Jorné & Nicole Mirante-Matthews	March 15, 2020	3.49
144	13	"What We Become"	Sharat Raju	Vivian Tse	March 22, 2020	3.66
145	14	"Look at the Flowers"	Daisy von Scherler Mayer	Channing Powell	March 29, 2020	3.26
146	15	"The Tower"	Laura Belsey	Kevin Deiboldt & Julia Ruchman	April 5, 2020	3.49
147	16	"A Certain Doom"	Greg Nicotero	Story by : Jim Barnes & Eli Jorné & Corey Reed; Teleplay by : Corey Reed	October 4, 2020	2.73
148	17	"Home Sweet Home"	David Boyd	Kevin Deiboldt & Corey Reed	February 28, 2021	2.89
149	18	"Find Me"	David Boyd	Nicole Mirante-Matthews	March 7, 2021	2.26
150	19	"One More"	Laura Belsey	Erik Mountain & Jim Barnes	March 14, 2021	2.17
151	20	"Splinter"	Laura Belsey	Julia Ruchman & Vivian Tse	March 21, 2021	2.11
152	21	"Diverged"	David Boyd	Heather Bellson	March 28, 2021	1.94
153	22	"Here's Negan"	Laura Belsey	David Leslie Johnson-McGoldrick	April 4, 2021	2.12

=== Season 11 (2021–22) ===
No. overall	No. in season	Title	Directed by	Written by	Original release date	U.S. viewers (millions)
154	1	"Acheron: Part I"	Kevin Dowling	Angela Kang & Jim Barnes	August 22, 2021	2.22
155	2	"Acheron: Part II"	Kevin Dowling	Angela Kang & Jim Barnes	August 29, 2021	1.99
156	3	"Hunted"	Frederick E.O. Toye	Vivian Tse	September 5, 2021	1.87
157	4	"Rendition"	Frederick E.O. Toye	Nicole Mirante-Matthews	September 12, 2021	1.88
158	5	"Out of the Ashes"	Greg Nicotero	LaToya Morgan	September 19, 2021	1.91
159	6	"On the Inside"	Greg Nicotero	Kevin Deiboldt	September 26, 2021	1.78
160	7	"Promises Broken"	Sharat Raju	Julia Ruchman	October 3, 2021	1.89
161	8	"For Blood"	Sharat Raju	Erik Mountain	October 10, 2021	1.91
162	9	"No Other Way"	Jon Amiel	Corey Reed	February 20, 2022	1.76
163	10	"New Haunts"	Jon Amiel	Magali Lozano	February 27, 2022	1.60
164	11	"Rogue Element"	Michael Cudlitz	David Leslie Johnson-McGoldrick	March 6, 2022	1.67
165	12	"The Lucky Ones"	Tawnia McKiernan	Vivian Tse	March 13, 2022	1.58
166	13	"Warlords"	Loren Yaconelli	Jim Barnes & Erik Mountain	March 20, 2022	1.79
167	14	"The Rotten Core"	Marcus Stokes	Erik Mountain & Jim Barnes	March 27, 2022	1.55
168	15	"Trust"	Lily Mariye	Kevin Deiboldt	April 3, 2022	1.67
169	16	"Acts of God"	Catriona McKenzie	Nicole Mirante-Matthews	April 10, 2022	1.61
170	17	"Lockdown"	Greg Nicotero	Julia Ruchman	October 2, 2022	1.19
171	18	"A New Deal"	Jeffrey F. January	Story by : Corey Reed; Teleplay by : Corey Reed & Kevin Deiboldt	October 9, 2022	1.35
172	19	"Variant"	Karen Gaviola	Vivian Tse	October 16, 2022	1.36
173	20	"What's Been Lost"	Aisha Tyler	Erik Mountain	October 23, 2022	1.36
174	21	"Outpost 22"	Tawnia McKiernan	Jim Barnes	October 30, 2022	1.50
175	22	"Faith"	Rose Troche	Nicole Mirante-Matthews & Magali Lozano	November 6, 2022	1.39
176	23	"Family"	Sharat Raju	Magali Lozano & Erik Mountain & Kevin Deiboldt	November 13, 2022	1.47
177	24	"Rest in Peace"	Greg Nicotero	Story by : Angela Kang; Teleplay by : Corey Reed & Jim Barnes	November 20, 2022	2.27

== Specials ==
A special titled "The Journey So Far" aired on October 16, 2016, as a recap of the first six seasons of The Walking Dead, featuring interviews with the cast and producers. It was watched by 2.18 million viewers.

== Webisodes ==
=== Torn Apart (2011) ===
Prior to the start of season 2, a six-episode web series called Torn Apart premiered on October 3, 2011, on AMC's official website. The web series is directed by special effects makeup artist and co-executive producer Greg Nicotero and tells the origin story of Hannah, also known as "Bicycle Girl", the walker that Rick Grimes killed out of mercy and whose bicycle he took in the first episode of the TV series.

No.	Title	Directed by	Written by	Original release date	Running time
1	"A New Day"	Greg Nicotero	Story by : John Esposito & Greg Nicotero; Teleplay by : John Esposito	October 3, 2011	2:37
2	"Family Matters"	Greg Nicotero	Story by : John Esposito & Greg Nicotero; Teleplay by : John Esposito	October 3, 2011	2:20
3	"Domestic Violence"	Greg Nicotero	Story by : John Esposito & Greg Nicotero; Teleplay by : John Esposito	October 3, 2011	3:10
4	"Neighborly Advice"	Greg Nicotero	Story by : John Esposito & Greg Nicotero; Teleplay by : John Esposito	October 3, 2011	4:00
5	"Step-Mother"	Greg Nicotero	Story by : John Esposito & Greg Nicotero; Teleplay by : John Esposito	October 3, 2011	2:22
6	"Everything Dies"	Greg Nicotero	Story by : John Esposito & Greg Nicotero; Teleplay by : John Esposito	October 3, 2011	5:06

=== Cold Storage (2012) ===
A four-episode web series entitled Cold Storage was released on October 1, 2012. Set during the zombie apocalypse, Cold Storage follows the story of Chase as he seeks shelter in a storage facility under the command of B.J., a malicious former employee who hides a very dark secret. The storage unit Chase is given was owned by Rick Grimes.

No.	Title	Directed by	Written by	Original release date	Running time
1	"Hide and Seek"	Greg Nicotero	John Esposito	October 1, 2012	4:29
2	"Keys to the Kingdom"	Greg Nicotero	John Esposito	October 1, 2012	4:57
3	"The Chosen Ones"	Greg Nicotero	John Esposito	October 1, 2012	5:38
4	"Parting Shots"	Greg Nicotero	John Esposito	October 1, 2012	9:04

=== The Oath (2013) ===
A three-part web series, entitled The Oath, was released on October 1, 2013. This series tells the origin of the "Don't Open, Dead Inside" paint on the cafeteria doors of the hospital Rick Grimes awakes in, post-apocalypse. It follows Paul and Karina as they escape their zombie-overrun camp in search of a medical station. The central theme of the series examines the will to persevere in the face of inevitable death.

No.	Title	Directed by	Written by	Original release date	Running time
1	"Alone"	Greg Nicotero	Story by : Greg Nicotero; Teleplay by : Luke Passmore	October 1, 2013	8:14
2	"Choice"	Greg Nicotero	Story by : Greg Nicotero; Teleplay by : Luke Passmore	October 1, 2013	7:26
3	"Bond"	Greg Nicotero	Story by : Greg Nicotero; Teleplay by : Luke Passmore	October 1, 2013	10:38

=== Red Machete (2017–18) ===
A six-part web series entitled Red Machete first premiered on October 22, 2017. The web series tells the origin story of Rick Grimes's red machete. The series starred actors Jose Rosete, Anais Lilit, Sofia Esmaili, and Jeff Kober, reprising his role as Joe, the leader of the Claimers from the fourth season of The Walking Dead.

No.	Title	Directed by	Written by	Original release date	Running time
1	"Behind Us"	Avi Youabian	Nick Bernardone	October 22, 2017	2:23
2	"Sorrowful"	Avi Youabian	Nick Bernardone	November 19, 2017	3:04
3	"Made to Suffer"	Avi Youabian	Nick Bernardone	December 10, 2017	1:53
4	"What We Become"	Avi Youabian	Nick Bernardone	February 25, 2018	3:33
5	"Gone"	Avi Youabian	Nick Bernardone	March 20, 2018	2:01
6	"We Find Ourselves"	Avi Youabian	Nick Bernardone	April 9, 2018	2:57

== Ratings ==
The Walking Dead : U.S. viewers per episode (millions)
Audience measurement performed by Nielsen Media Research
