= The Lucky Ones (The Walking Dead) =

- The Walking Dead episode
- Episode no.: Season 11; Episode 12
- Directed by: Tawnia McKiernan
- Written by: Vivian Tse
- Cinematography by: Duane Charles Manwiller
- Editing by: Shari Mead
- Original air date: March 13, 2022
- Running time: 52 minutes

Guest appearances
- Ian Anthony Dale as Tomichi Okumura; Kerry Cahill as Dianne; Avianna Mynhier as Rachel Ward; Okea Eme-Akwari as Elijah; Chelle Ramos as Shira; Kien Michael Spiller as Hershel Rhee; Nicholas Velez as Theo

Episode chronology
← Previous "Rogue Element"	Next → "Warlords"
- The Walking Dead (season 11)

"The Lucky Ones" is the twelfth episode of the eleventh season of the post-apocalyptic horror television series The Walking Dead. The 165th episode of the series overall, the episode was directed by Tawnia McKiernan and written by Vivian Tse. "The Lucky Ones" premiered on AMC on March 13, 2022.

In the episode, Aaron (Ross Marquand) and Maggie (Lauren Cohan) meet Governor Pamela Milton (Laila Robins) while she visits Alexandria, Oceanside and Hilltop. Ezekiel (Khary Payton) gets lucky during a routine check-up. Eugene (Josh McDermitt) processes Max's (Margot Bingham) story. The episode received positive reviews from critics.

== Plot ==
A woman introduces herself to Eugene (Josh McDermitt) as Max Mercer (Margot Bingham), who was using her mother's name as a code name. Even though she wanted to meet Eugene, once her brother Mercer (Michael James Shaw) learned about it, he covered it up when Lance (Josh Hamilton) was also alerted to his breach in communication protocol and forced herself to keep quiet upon seeing Eugene with Shira.

Eugene runs away due to being upset, but eventually reconciles with Max and the pair express a persistent interest in each other.

Meanwhile, Pamela (Laila Robins) takes a tour of the Coalition settlements and is unimpressed to hear that Alexandria has fallen more than once. After meeting with Oceanside, Pamela (Laila Robins) goes to Hilltop, where she debates with Maggie (Lauren Cohan) about their different leadership styles and forms of government. Maggie is suspicious of the Commonwealth and refuses to accept help from them, much to the frustration of several Hilltop residents who decide to join the Commonwealth.

Lance is also frustrated with Maggie's decision, but insists to Aaron (Ross Marquand) that he will persevere, seeking to increase his power to get out from under Pamela. Meanwhile, Ezekiel (Khary Payton) is admitted for surgery to remove his tumor, having been transferred for treatment by Lance as a favor to Carol (Melissa McBride).

== Reception ==
=== Critical reception ===
"The Lucky Ones" received positive reviews. On Rotten Tomatoes, the episode has an approval rating of 86%, with an average score of 6.80 out of 10, based on 7 reviews.

Alex McLevy for The A.V. Club rated the episode a B−, calling it "one of those table-setting episodes of The Walking Dead that manages to wring some drama from a few conversations, thanks to the long-lasting effects the decisions made will have upon the rest of the season." Erik Kain for Forbes was critical of the episode and wrote: "What a joke The Walking Dead has become. The first episode of this Season 11 Part 2 was actually pretty good, but it’s been laughably bad ever since. For shame."

=== Ratings ===
The episode had a total of 1.58 million viewers in its original airing on AMC.
