= Trust (The Walking Dead) =

- The Walking Dead episode
- Episode no.: Season 11; Episode 15
- Directed by: Lily Mariye
- Written by: Kevin Deiboldt
- Cinematography by: Scott Kevan
- Editing by: Alan Cody
- Original air date: April 3, 2022
- Running time: 44 minutes

Guest appearances
- Ian Anthony Dale as Tomichi Okumura; Okea Eme-Akwari as Elijah; Antony Azor as R.J. Grimes; Kien Michael Spiller as Hershel Rhee; Nicholas Velez as Theo; David Alexander as Janitor

Episode chronology
| ← Previous "The Rotten Core" | Next → "Acts of God" |
- The Walking Dead (season 11)

"Trust" is the fifteenth episode of the eleventh season of the post-apocalyptic horror television series The Walking Dead. The 168th episode of the series overall, the episode was directed by Lily Mariye and written by Kevin Deiboldt. "Trust" premiered on AMC on April 3, 2022.

In the episode, Lance Hornsby (Josh Hamilton) marches with Daryl (Norman Reedus) and troops to confront Maggie (Lauren Cohan) at Hilltop. After a harrowing robbery, Rosita (Christian Serratos) gets Connie (Lauren Ridloff), Kelly (Angel Theory), Eugene (Josh McDermitt) and Max (Margot Bingham) to investigate the Miltons. Ezekiel (Khary Payton) helps hospital patients in need.

The episode received positive reviews from critics.

== Plot ==
Daryl and a team of Commonwealth troopers investigate Carlson's corpse and the bloody aftermath at the apartment complex. Lance interrogates Gabriel and Aaron, then leads a group of Commonwealth soldiers to Hilltop to interrogate Maggie. Lance intensely questions Hershel about Maggie's possible involvement, leading to a tense confrontation when Elijah and Maggie threaten Lance and Daryl sides with his friends in forcing Lance to leave.

Mercer and Princess have developed a sexual relationship, while Mercer struggles with the decision to kill his own men. Mercer's alarm clock goes off. Princess wakes up next to him and sees that Mercer is already awake. She asks if he's okay. Mercer insists he's fine.

Rosita tells Eugene what happened with Sebastian and he calls Connie and Kelly to report the matter; they realize that April was one of the names on the list that Connie received.

Inspired by Carol and her new lease on life, Ezekiel opens a secret clinic for those still far down the list and recruits Tomi to help him with the surgery.

Max visits Eugene and agrees to steal the files. Eugene vows to stand by her side. They kiss for the first time.

Leah cleans a gun at her camp in the woods. Commonwealth troopers find her camp, but no one is inside the tent. Leah ambushes them, injuring two of them. Lance asks Leah to hold her fire so that they can talk. Leah emerges from the darkness with a rifle. Lance smiles and says he's here to offer her a job.

== Reception ==
=== Critical reception ===
"Trust" received very positive reviews. On Rotten Tomatoes, the episode had an approval rating of 83%, with an average score of 8 out of 10, based on 6 reviews. Paul Daily of "TV Fanatic" praised the episode giving it a score of 4 to 5 and wrote: "As a penultimate episode, "Trust" was very good. There were some moments that were out there, and I'm not too sure Leah should still be on the show, but we'll see what the midseason finale brings us." Alex McLevy for The A.V. Club rated the episode a B, calling it "The fuse has been lit—now, it’s just a question of when the massive explosion of everything involving the Commonwealth that’s been established over the past season is going to happen."

=== Ratings ===
The episode had a total of 1,67 million viewers in its original airing on AMC.
