= Rogue Element =

- The Walking Dead episode
- Episode no.: Season 11; Episode 11
- Directed by: Michael Cudlitz
- Written by: David Leslie Johnson-McGoldrick
- Cinematography by: Scott Kevan
- Editing by: Alan Cody
- Original air date: March 6, 2022
- Running time: 46 minutes

Guest appearances
- Angel Theory as Kelly; Chelle Ramos as Shira; Michael Tourek as Roman Calhoun; Aneesh Sheth as Jan; William Mark McCullough as Moto; Maryjean Feton as Old Woman; Bruno Rose as Comms Monitor; Darrell Snedeger as Hospital Trooper; David E. Collier as Logistics Officer; Carrie Walrond Hood as Nurse

Episode chronology
← Previous "New Haunts"	Next → "The Lucky Ones"
- The Walking Dead (season 11)

"Rogue Element" is the eleventh episode of the eleventh season of the post-apocalyptic horror television series The Walking Dead. The 164th episode of the series overall, the episode was directed by former cast member Michael Cudlitz and written by David Leslie Johnson-McGoldrick. "Rogue Element" premiered on AMC on March 6, 2022.

In the episode, Eugene (Josh McDermitt) searches for Stephanie (Chelle Ramos) after she mysteriously disappears. Connie (Lauren Ridloff) investigates a story about Private Tyler Davis (Cameron Roberts). Carol (Melissa McBride) helps Lance Hornsby (Josh Hamilton) with a labor dispute at a drug farm.

The episode received mixed reviews from critics.

== Plot ==
Eugene (Josh McDermitt) has entered into a relationship with Stephanie (Chelle Ramos) and tells her he loves her; right after she tells him she loves him too, she mysteriously disappears. Eugene becomes obsessed with finding Stephanie and breaks into a man's house looking for evidence, but fails and Princess (Paola Lázaro) insists that she must have broken up and abandoned him. Eugene soon finds Stephanie again conspiring with Lance (Josh Hamilton) for an unknown task, and gets Lance to confess that "Stephanie" was a disguised woman named Shira who was used to get Eugene to confess to Alexandria's location due to many inconsistencies during the group audition. Lance tells Eugene that the group is better now, despite his heart breaking for Shira.

Meanwhile, Connie (Lauren Ridloff) and Kelly (Angel Theory) investigate the Commonwealth military and its treatment of Tyler Davis (Cameron Roberts), and Carol (Melissa McBride) helps Lance deal with a neighboring community whose leader is extorting the Commonwealth for money. Eugene is later approached by "Max", who reveals herself to be the woman he was in contact with over the radio.

== Reception ==
=== Critical reception ===
"Rogue Element" received mixed reviews. On Rotten Tomatoes, the episode has an approval rating of 71%, with an average score of 7.20 out of 10, based on 7 reviews.

Erik Kain for Forbes wrote of the episode: "The Walking Dead feels utterly unrecognizable for the most part these days, a tired husk of its former self barely clinging on. The Commonwealth is lame and the way they’ve integrated the characters into it is implausible at best." Alex McLevy for The A.V. Club rated the episode a B, calling it "Huh. That was different." Rith Cross for Starburst calific the episode from 3 to 5 rating and wrote: "Eugene makes for a predictably tenacious and single-minded investigator, and director Michael Cudlitz focuses attention on his efforts to peel away layers of deception and denial in what is a cleverly constructed script by David Leslie Johnson-McGoldrick."

=== Ratings ===
The episode had a total of 1.67 million viewers in its original airing on AMC.
