= Warlords (The Walking Dead) =

- The Walking Dead episode
- Episode no.: Season 11; Episode 13
- Directed by: Loren Yaconelli
- Written by: Jim Barnes & Erik Mountain
- Cinematography by: Scott Kevan
- Editing by: Tiffany Melvin
- Original air date: March 20, 2022
- Running time: 44 minutes

Guest appearances
- Michael Biehn as Ian; Jason Butler Harner as Toby Carlson; Medina Senghore as Annie Smith; Okea Eme-Akwari as Elijah; Connor Hammond as Jesse; Kien Michael Spiller as Hershel Rhee; Gustavo Gomez as Marco; Michael Hanson as Jake Daniels; Braian Rivera Jimenez as Green; Henry Bazemore Jr. as Sgt. Crowe; Jenique Hendrix as Hart; Camry Rose Brault as Shipment Trooper

Episode chronology
← Previous "The Lucky Ones"	Next → "The Rotten Core"
- The Walking Dead (season 11)

"Warlords" is the thirteenth episode of the eleventh season of the post-apocalyptic horror television series The Walking Dead. The 166th episode of the series overall, the episode was directed by Loren Yaconelli and written by Jim Barnes & Erik Mountain. "Warlords" premiered on AMC on March 20, 2022.

In the episode, Maggie (Lauren Cohan) and Lydia (Cassady McClincy) join an outside community called Riverbend. They meet Aaron (Ross Marquand), who tells him about a mission he embarked with Gabriel (Seth Gilliam) as emissaries to the Commonwealth. The episode receives positive reviews from critics.

== Plot ==
Aaron (Ross Marquand) and Gabriel (Seth Gilliam) are recruited by Aaron's chief, Toby Carlson (Jason Butler Harner), to participate in an outreach mission with a community in an apartment complex, seeking to offer them access to the Commonwealth.

The leader of the complex, Ian (Michael Biehn), meets with the group but is unconvinced of their kindness. Although Aaron and Gabriel convince Ian to let them leave with their lives, Carlson suddenly attacks Ian and several of his people. Carlson was actually appointed by Lance (Josh Hamilton) to take over, proving that the community were responsible for a previous attack on a Commonwealth caravan.

Gabriel meets up with Negan (Jeffrey Dean Morgan), who secretly sends a message to Hilltop with Jesse (Connor Hammond) on the run. Maggie (Lauren Cohan), Lydia (Cassady McClincy) and Elijah (Okea Eme-Akwari) go to the complex to fight Commonwealth troops after meeting Aaron.

== Reception ==
=== Critical reception ===
"Warlords" received positive reviews. On Rotten Tomatoes, the episode has an approval rating of 86%, with an average rating of 7.90 out of 10, based on 7 ratings.

Erik Kain for Forbes was critical of the episode and wrote: "The problem is that the events that comprise this story are so implausible and ridiculous that any attempt at nonlinear storytelling just comes off as a way to disguise the poor plotting". Alex McLevy for The A.V. Club rated the episode a B, calling it "Part of the wicked fun of “Warlords” is how it keeps doubling back on itself, retreating in time to reveal another layer to the situation."

=== Ratings ===
The episode has a total of 1.79 million viewers in its original airing on AMC.
