= The Anne Frank Gift Shop =

2023 American short film

- Film poster
- Directed by: Mickey Rapkin
- Written by: Mickey Rapkin
- Produced by: Noam Dromi; Greg Zekowski
- Starring: Ari Graynor; Chris Perfetti; Kate Burton; Jason Butler Harner; Mary Beth Barone; Josh Meyers
- Cinematography: Chloe Weaver
- Edited by: Tim Nackashi
- Music by: Peter Seibert
- Production company: Reboot Studios
- Release date: July 25, 2023 (LA Shorts Fest)
- Running time: 15 minutes
- Country: United States
- Language: English

The Anne Frank Gift Shop is a 2023 American short black comedy drama film written and directed by Mickey Rapkin. It stars Ari Graynor, Chris Perfetti, Kate Burton, Jason Butler Harner, Mary Beth Barone, and Josh Meyers.

== Summary ==
The film is about a meeting where a design firm proposes plans to re-imagine the Anne Frank House's gift shop while appealing to Generation Z.

== Cast ==
- Ari Graynor as Amy
- Chris Perfetti as Ben
- Kate Burton as Ilse
- Jason Butler Harner as Jack
- Mary Beth Barone as Madison
- Josh Meyers as Diedrick

== Accolades ==
The film won Best Narrative Short at the 2023 San Francisco Jewish Film Festival. It was shortlisted for Best Live Action Short Film at the 96th Academy Awards, but was not nominated.
