= Live Nude Girls =

1995 film by Steve White

- Theatrical release poster
- Directed by: Julianna Lavin
- Written by: Julianna Lavin
- Produced by: Barry Bernardi; Cara Tapper; Steve White
- Starring: Dana Delany; Kim Cattrall; Cynthia Stevenson; Laila Robins; Lora Zane; Olivia d'Abo
- Cinematography: Christopher Taylor
- Edited by: Adam Bernardi; Kathryn Himoff
- Music by: Anton Sanko
- Distributed by: Republic Pictures; Paramount Pictures
- Release date: December 8, 1995
- Running time: 95 minutes
- Country: United States
- Language: English

Live Nude Girls is a 1995 American comedy film featuring Dana Delany, Kim Cattrall, Cynthia Stevenson, Laila Robins, Lora Zane and Olivia d'Abo. The film writer and director Julianna Lavin (in her directorial debut) plays the role of a minor character.

== Synopsis ==
A group of childhood friends have a sleepover as a bachelorette party for Jamie, where the conversations evolve from the topic of their relationships with men to sex and related fantasies. The group includes two sisters, Rachel and Jill, between whom remains some emotional tension. The hostess for the evening, the bisexual Georgina, is pestered by her possessive live-in lover Chris, who declines to join the party, staying in her bedroom.

== Cast ==
- Dana Delany as Jill
- Kim Cattrall as Jamie
- Cynthia Stevenson as Marcy
- Laila Robins as Rachel
- Lora Zane as Georgina
- Olivia d'Abo as Chris
- Glenn Quinn as Randy
- Tim Choate as Jerome
- Jeremy Jordan as Jeffery, Greenpeace boy
- Vaginal Davis as the pool man
- Simon Templeman as Bob
- Julianna Lavin as the fighting neighbor woman
- Jerry Spicer as the fighting neighbor man
- Joshua Beckett as Richard Silver
- Brian Markinson as Jerome's friend
- Amber Tamblyn as Young Jill

== Release ==
=== Box office ===
Live Nude Girls received limited release grossing $23,808.

=== Critical reception ===
On review aggregator website Rotten Tomatoes, the film holds an approval rating of 38% based on eight reviews. The film received mostly negative reviews from critics, but performances praised by some critics.
