= The Rotten Core =

- The Walking Dead episode
- Episode no.: Season 11; Episode 14
- Directed by: Marcus Stokes
- Written by: Erik Mountain & Jim Barnes
- Cinematography by: Duane Charles Manwiller
- Editing by: Jack Colwell
- Original air date: March 27, 2022
- Running time: 44 minutes

Guest appearances
- Jason Butler Harner as Toby Carlson; Medina Senghore as Annie Smith; Wynn Everett as April Martens; Okea Eme-Akwari as Elijah; Teo Rapp-Olsson as Sebastian Milton; Kien Michael Spiller as Hershel Rhee; Courtney Dietz as Kayla Brand; Michael Hanson as Jake Daniels; Braian Rivera Jimenez as Green; Henry Bazemore Jr. as Sgt. Crowe; Camry Rose Brault as Shipment Trooper; Monique Grant as Colonel Vickers; J.R. Adduci as Alves

Episode chronology
← Previous "Warlords"	Next → "Trust"
- The Walking Dead (season 11)

"The Rotten Core" is the fourteenth episode of the eleventh season of the post-apocalyptic horror television series The Walking Dead. The 167th episode of the series overall, the episode was directed by Marcus Stokes and written by Erik Mountain & Jim Barnes. "The Rotten Core" premiered on AMC on March 27, 2022.

In the episode, Maggie (Lauren Cohan) and Lydia (Cassady McClincy) help Aaron (Ross Marquand) and Gabriel (Seth Gilliam) on a rescue mission. In the chaos, Negan (Jeffrey Dean Morgan) finds himself caring for Hershel (Kien Michael Spiller). Sebastian Milton (Teo Rapp-Olsson) coerces Daryl (Norman Reedus) and Rosita (Christian Serratos) into carrying out a robbery. The episode received very positive reviews from critics.

== Plot ==
With his mother, Pamela cutting off his line of credit, Sebastian (Teo Rapp-Olsson) forces Daryl (Norman Reedus) and Rosita (Christian Serratos) to get a sum of money from a walker-infested house after threatening Judith, R.J. and Coco.

The pair recover the money and try to help April (Wynn Everett), a woman who was previously forced by Sebastian to attempt the task alongside many others who died in the attempt; Mercer (Michael James Shaw) and Carol (Melissa McBride) come to her aid, but April is killed by walkers and later stabbed by Rosita in the head to prevent reanimation.

Mercer kills two Commonwealth soldiers who were loyal to Sebastian and makes Daryl and Rosita hand over the money, fearing retribution if they do not.

At the complex, the group joins forces with Negan (Jeffrey Dean Morgan), Annie (Medina Senghore) and the complex's survivors and discovers that Negan has married Annie and is expecting a child with her. Hiding in Maggie's van, Hershel (Kien Michael Spiller) is rescued by Negan and forces him to confess to Glenn's murder, and almost kills him before being convinced. The group corners and Aaron kills Carlson (Jason Butler Harner), and it is revealed that Leah (Lynn Collins) was the one who broke into the caravan and stole the Commonwealth's weapons.

== Reception ==
=== Critical reception ===
"The Rotten Core" received very positive reviews. On Rotten Tomatoes, the episode had an approval rating of 100%, with an average score of 8.40 out of 10, based on 6 reviews. Paul Dailly of TV Fanatic gave a score of 4 to 5 points praising the episode, writing: "["The Rotten Core"] featured a nice blend of action, high-stakes, and revelations about the Commonwealth and Negan." Alex McLevy for The A.V. Club rated the episode a B, calling it "In many ways, the two stories that drive “The Rotten Core” are flip sides of the same corrupt coin."

=== Ratings ===
The episode had a total of 1.55 million viewers in its original airing on AMC.
