= New Haunts =

- The Walking Dead episode
- Episode no.: Season 11; Episode 10
- Directed by: Jon Amiel
- Written by: Magali Lozano
- Cinematography by: Duane Charles Manwiller
- Editing by: Tiffany Melvin; Olivia Wyrick
- Original air date: February 27, 2022
- Running time: 41 minutes

Guest appearances
- Ian Anthony Dale as Tomichi Okumura; Angel Theory as Kelly; Teo Rapp-Olsson as Sebastian Milton; Cameron Roberts as Tyler Davis; Nadine Marissa as Nabila; Antony Azor as R.J. Grimes; Chiara Misawa as Mei; Michael Hanson as Jake Daniels; Bruce Blackshear as Walker; Braian Rivera Jimenez as Green; Sharon Conley as Sally; Sean McCracken as Doorman

Episode chronology
← Previous "No Other Way"	Next → "Rogue Element"
- The Walking Dead (season 11)

"New Haunts" is the tenth episode of the eleventh season of the post-apocalyptic horror television series The Walking Dead. The 163rd episode of the series overall, the episode was directed by Jon Amiel and written by Magali Lozano. "New Haunts" premiered on AMC on February 27, 2022.

Halloween is celebrated in the Commonwealth. Daryl (Norman Reedus) and Rosita (Christian Serratos) undergo military training led by Mercer (Michael James Shaw). Carol (Melissa McBride) investigates Ezekiel's (Khary Payton) medical condition. This episode marks the first appearance of the character Pamela Milton from the comic, who is played by Laila Robins.

== Plot ==
Daryl, Judith and R.J. walk stealthily down a dark hallway filled with caged walkers. A walker approaches them, but retreats after Daryl sends him away. He was an actor and they are in a Haunted Labyrinth. Daryl, Judith and R.J leave the Haunted Labyrinth and celebrate Commonwealth Halloween. It is day 30 of their new life in the Commonwealth.

Daryl and Rosita are training to join the Commonwealth army and much of the group is still struggling to become part of a large, affluent society. Judith and RJ are living with Daryl at the apartment he has been given during his training. Having spent most of his life in poverty, Daryl is chafing under the Commonwealth's class system, which is reminiscent of the pre-apocalyptic order. He has to teach the kids about basic economics because the community rations goods with pre-apocalyptic currency. After saving his pay, Daryl gives Judith a record player and a record of Motörhead's song, "Eat The Rich." They listen to the song together and Judith loves it.

Ezekiel plays with Jerry's kids and R.J. and gives one of them Shiva's old collar. Carol asks Ezekiel how he's feeling. Ezekiel insists he's doing well. Carol sneaks into the hospital and looks up Ezekiel's medical record. Tomi, who is now working as a surgeon, catches her in the act but decides to help her out. He observes that Ezekiel is unlikely to get his surgery in time to save him, given his place far down on the waiting list.

At a masquerade ball held by Governor Pamela Milton, a disgraced ex-soldier, Tyler Davis, takes Pamela's assistant Max hostage out of desperation to talk to Pamela, but flees. Daryl gets him to surrender, but allows Sebastian to take credit for capturing him. Ezekiel visits Carol and gives her a keepsake box that had belonged to Henry. Carol again asks Ezekiel how he's doing. She tears up when Ezekiel assures her that he's fine. They sit together and drink wine Carol kept for herself after her search.

Daryl, Rosita and a Commonwealth police team burst into Tyler Davis's apartment in search of rebels. Rosita finds a secret room at the bottom of a closet full of resistance advertising.

== Reception ==
=== Critical reception ===
The episode received positive reviews. On review aggregator website Rotten Tomatoes, "New Haunts" has a score of 89%, with an average score of 7/10 across 9 reviews.

Erik Kain for Forbes wrote of the episode: "Okay at best, a glimpse into The Commonwealth that left me irritated more than impressed." Alex McLevy for The A.V. Club rated the episode a B−, calling it "It’s only a matter of time before battle lines are drawn, and it’ll (hopefully) be interesting to watch the dominoes fall."

=== Ratings ===
The episode had a total of 1.60 million viewers in its original airing on AMC.
