= Gladiators Don't Run =

- Scandal episode
- Maya Lewis helping Jake, Huck and Quinn bid on the auction of Olivia.
- Episode no.: Season 4 Episode 12
- Directed by: Randy Zisk
- Written by: Paul Williams Davies
- Original air date: February 12, 2015

Guest appearances
- Portia de Rossi as Elizabeth North; Jon Tenney as Andrew Nichols; Jason Butler Harner as Ian Woods; Khandi Alexander as Maya Lewis/Marie Wallace; Chad Donella as Gus

Episode chronology
← Previous "Where's the Black Lady?"	Next → "No More Blood"
- Scandal (season 4)

"Gladiators Don't Run" is the twelfth episode of the fourth season of Scandal, and is the 59th overall episode. It aired on February 12, 2015, in the U.S. on ABC.

== Plot ==
The auction for Olivia Pope starts on the free market and everyone tries to get access to the event. Fitz and the White House try to get access, but in order to do that, they must collaborate with terrorists. Jake, Quinn and Huck also try to access the auction, but they struggle to get an invitation.

Fitz tries to make Andrew resign as Vice President, but he refuses – leading Cyrus to take matters into his own hands. As such, Cyrus blackmails Elizabeth to testify against Andrew to prove the assassination of the Vice President was staged. Andrew confronts Mellie, threatening her to reveal their affair to the press if he gets arrested. This makes Mellie ask Fitz to make Andrew resign instead of arresting him after revealing her plans to run as President after Fitz's term ends, and this chance will be damaged if her affair with Andrew becomes public. Fitz accepts Mellie's request.

Jake, Quinn and Huck ask Maya Lewis for help to get an invitation to the auction as they need an international terrorist to which she agrees after they accept her demands – much to David's dismay. She tells Jake and Huck to meet a drug trafficker named Gustavo Paneida, whom she believes can help them get access. However, it is only some guards who she orders Huck to kill for payment to Gustavo. When Jake arrives to the scene, he is shocked by Huck's raged way of killing the men and his behavior. He confronts Quinn about Huck's behavior, worrying about him not coming to go back to normal.

Abby gets suspicious about Liv's absence after Olivia's not returning her phone calls, and after checking her apartment she confronts Huck and Quinn but they refuse to inform her. Abby begins to get distracted from her work, which Fitz notices and informs her about Olivia's kidnapping. She confronts David and expresses her anger at him for not telling her about her best friend being kidnapped.

Ian calls Andrew to tell him that he was selling Olivia on the free market. After promising Olivia to choose for herself who she will be bought by, one of the kidnappers named Gus kills Ian just before the auction begins. Olivia tries to convince the other two kidnappers to let her go free before Gus kills them, but they refuse. Gus sells Olivia to an outside buyer, Iran, much to Olivia's dismay. Huck manages to access the auction, but just at the moment when Liv is bought. He begins to talk about what the buyer is going to do to Olivia to control Fitz and the United States, which angers Quinn into attacking him after realizing how damaged Huck has become. Fitz is informed about the purchase and is angry at the directors to refuse to rescue Olivia. Gus and the other kidnappers deliver Olivia to her purchasers.

== Production ==
The episode was written by Paul Williams Davies and directed by Randy Zisk. The episode featured the song "Think" by Aretha Franklin. The episode focuses on the auction for Olivia Pope on the open market as well as the White House and Huck, Jake and Quinn trying to participate in the auction.

Scouting for the episode began on December 4, 2014. The table read was on January 5, 2015. The episode was formerly named "Full Circle" but was changed to "Gladiators Don't Run" for unknown reasons. Showrunner Shonda Rhimes explained on Twitter that the twelfth and thirteenth episodes was one extended episode and was therefore divided into two episodes.

== Reception ==
=== Broadcasting ===
"Gladiators Don't Run" was originally broadcast on Thursday, February 12, 2015 in the United States on ABC. The episode's total viewership was 9.32 million, marking a season low as the same with the sixth episode "An Innocent Man". The episode was up 13 percent from its comparable telecast from last year. In the key 18-49 demographic, the episode scored a 3.1/10 in Nielsen ratings, up 11 percent from last year. It was the top TV show in the 9:00 p.m. slot, beating The Blacklist with 82 percent, Two and a Half Men with 63 percent and Backstrom with 138 percent.

The episode's ratings was down from the previous episode, with a 0.26 decrease in total viewers from last episode, and one tenth decrease to the installment's 3.2 Nielsen rating in the target 18–49 demographic. The Nielsen score additionally registered the show as the week's third-highest rated drama and third-highest rated scripted series in the 18–49 demographic, only behind Fox's Empire and ABC's Modern Family. Seven days of time-shifted viewing added on an additional 1.6 rating points in the 18–49 demographic and 3.91 million viewers, bringing the total viewership for the episode to 13.24 million viewers with a 4.7 Nielsen rating in the 18–49 demographic.
