= Rest in Peace (The Walking Dead) =

- The Walking Dead episode
- Episode no.: Season 11; Episode 24
- Directed by: Greg Nicotero
- Story by: Angela Kang
- Teleplay by: Corey Reed; Jim Barnes
- Cinematography by: Duane Charles Manwiller
- Editing by: Alan Cody
- Original air date: November 20, 2022
- Running time: 65 minutes

Guest appearances
- Dan Fogler as Luke; Ian Anthony Dale as Tomichi Okumura; Okea Eme-Akwari as Elijah; Kerry Cahill as Dianne; Alex Sgambati as Jules; Nadine Marissa as Nabila; Anabelle Holloway as Gracie; Andrew Lincoln as Rick Grimes; Danai Gurira as Michonne; Michael Cudlitz as Abraham Ford (voice); Lennie James as Morgan Jones (voice); Laurie Holden as Andrea (voice); Chandler Riggs as Carl Grimes (voice); Sonequa Martin-Green as Sasha Williams (voice); Steven Yeun as Glenn Rhee (voice)

Episode chronology
← Previous "Family"	Next → —
- The Walking Dead (season 11)

"Rest in Peace" is the twenty-fourth and final episode of the eleventh season of the post-apocalyptic horror television series The Walking Dead. The series finale and 177th episode overall, it aired on AMC on November 20, 2022. It was simultaneously released on the network's streaming platform AMC+. The episode's teleplay was written by Corey Reed and Jim Barnes, from a story by Angela Kang, and directed by Greg Nicotero.

In the finale, the group escapes the horde that has invaded the Commonwealth while simultaneously trying to overthrow Governor Pamela Milton (Laila Robins), and assembling for one last stand to save the city and their future.

"Rest in Peace" features the return of Rick Grimes, portrayed by Andrew Lincoln, and Michonne, portrayed by Danai Gurira, since they left the series in season 9 and 10, respectively. The first episode of The Walking Dead: The Ones Who Live places the scene with Rick as at some point during the first five years following his disappearance in "What Comes After". The second episode of The Ones Who Live places the scenes with Michonne shortly after her departure in "What We Become". The episode also includes flashbacks of several characters featured throughout the series.

The episode received generally positive reviews from critics. Reviews highlighted the end of plot threads, character development, and the return of Rick and Michonne. At the same time, some felt the setting-up of future spin-off shows detracted from the finality of the series.

== Plot ==
While attempting to bypass the horde that has invaded the Commonwealth, Jules is devoured by the horde and Luke is bitten in the left leg. In a safehouse, Judith is treated by Tomi, and reveals to Daryl and Carol that Michonne had left in search of a still-alive Rick. After amputating Luke's leg, Magna, Connie, Yumiko and Kelly emotionally gather around him as he dies, despite the amputation. Meanwhile, Rosita, Gabriel and Eugene successfully rescue Coco and the other children from a house and fight their way through the horde. As they regroup in an apartment, Rosita reveals to Eugene that she was bitten on the left side of her back by a walker, but implores him to keep it quiet.

Elsewhere, Princess and Max break Mercer out of prison. Mercer subsequently leads his men and the Coalition forces in confronting Pamela as she barricades herself in the Estates. As Maggie prepares to take up arms against Pamela, Negan sincerely apologizes to Maggie for killing her husband, Glenn. With the people outside the Estates' gates about to be devoured by the oncoming horde, Daryl delivers a rousing speech that causes Pamela's soldiers to turn on her and allow everyone inside. Mercer arrests Pamela for her crimes against the Commonwealth. Pamela then attempts to commit suicide by allowing a zombified Lance Hornsby to bite her, but Maggie shoots and kills the zombified Lance, realizing that justice would be better served if Pamela is imprisoned. Realizing that the hordes of the walking dead have become too dangerous to simply lead away due to the new variants present, Aaron, Lydia, Jerry and Elijah help organize the Coalition forces. Metal-rock song 'Cult of Personality' is blared through the PA system to herd the hordes towards areas of the Estates rigged with massive quantities of explosives and fuel, which are then detonated and set alight, destroying large parts of the Estates but also destroying the hordes of the walking dead.

The next day, Pamela is shown to be imprisoned, ostensibly for life for her corruption and crimes against the people of the Commonwealth. Maggie tells Negan that while she is grateful to him for saving the life of her son Hershel, she is still constantly reminded of what Negan did to Glenn whenever she sees Negan's face; Negan understands this to be a request for him to leave the Commonwealth as a way towards maintaining peace. Daryl and Negan respectfully acknowledge each other as Negan later departs while the group celebrates its successes with a lavish dinner, where Rosita finally reveals to the group that she was bitten. As she begins to succumb to the infection, she bids farewell to her baby, and the group members say their final goodbyes. Rosita then peacefully passes away in bed with Eugene by her side.

A year later, Ezekiel and Mercer are the new governor and lieutenant governor of the Commonwealth, respectively, while Alexandria and the Hilltop have been rebuilt and are thriving, with the communities remaining united in creating a better future. Eugene and Max have a child together, Rosie, while Judith receives a letter from Negan, returning to her the compass that she had previously allowed him to keep. Lastly, Carol, Daryl and Maggie talk about the future, with Daryl leaving on his motorcycle to search for Rick and Michonne.

Far away, Rick and Michonne separately write letters around their own campfires while flashbacks to moments in the series appear. Wearing new armor, Michonne continues her search for Rick on horseback, riding toward a gargantuan horde of walkers. On the shores of Rat Island just outside the Civic Republic of Philadelphia, Rick is located by CRM operatives and forced to surrender, throwing his stuff into a boat where Michonne would later find them before surrendering to a helicopter with a smirk on his face.

The series concludes with Judith and R.J. looking ahead to the future, with the former saying: "We get to start over. We're the ones who live."

== Production ==
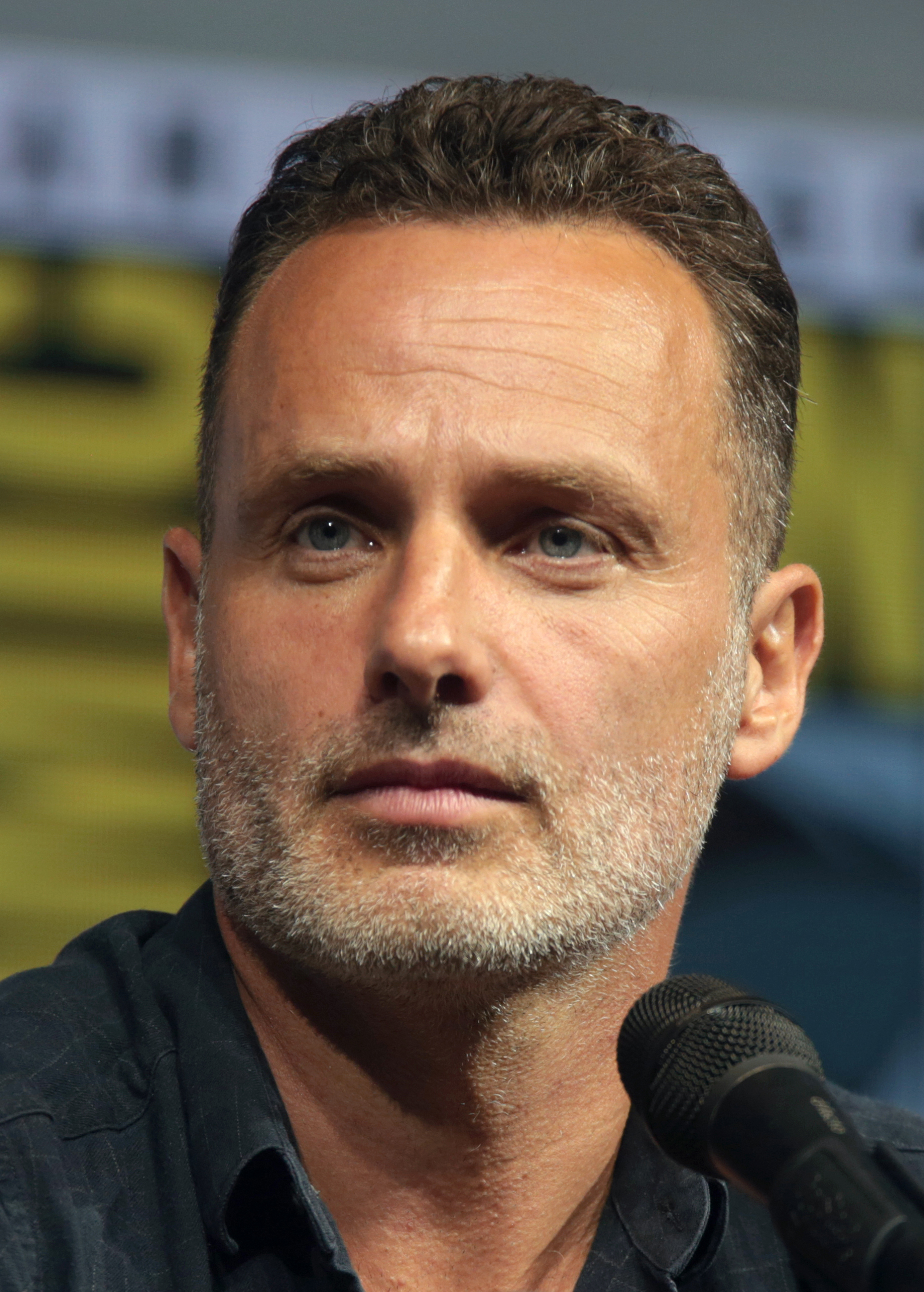
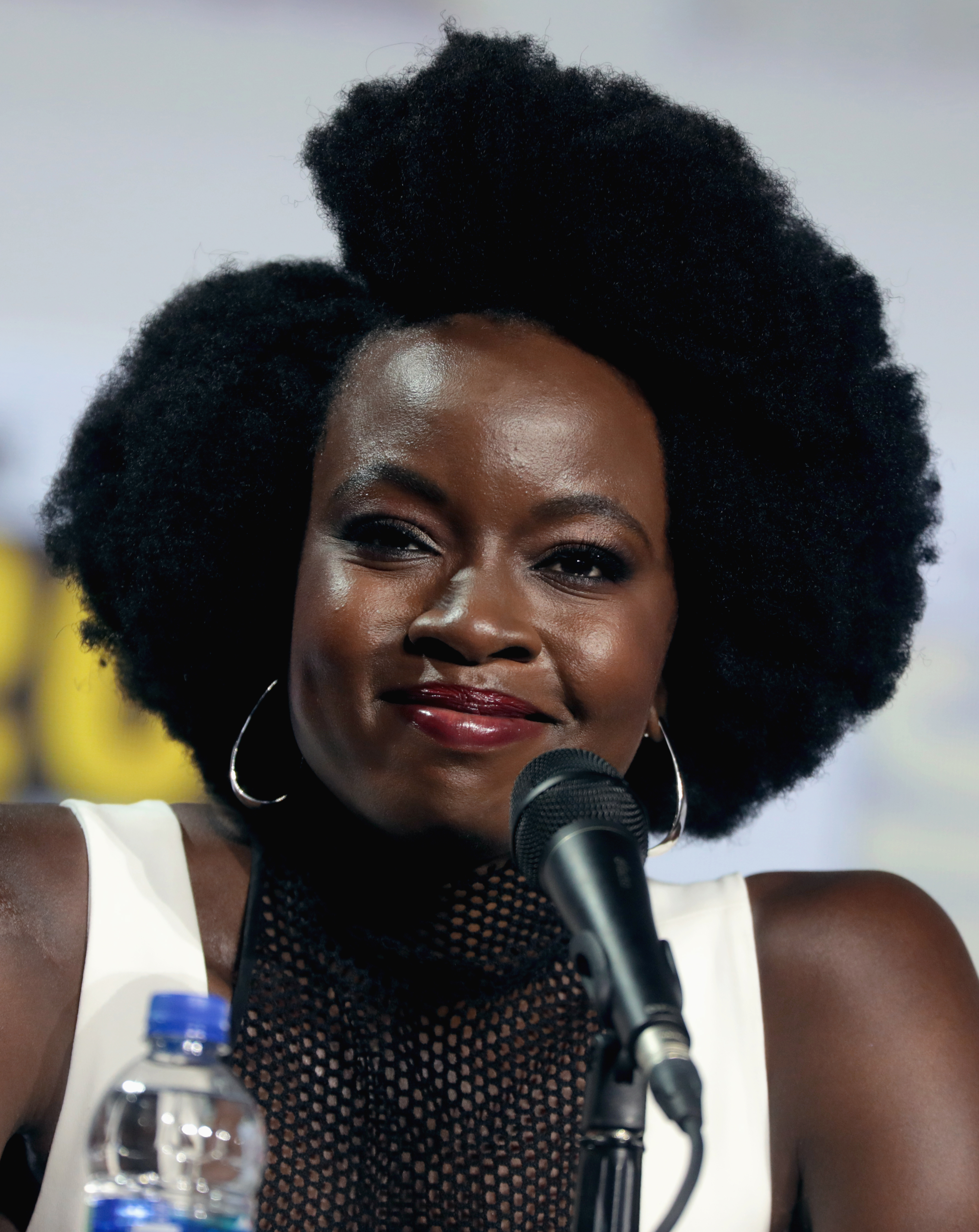
Andrew Lincoln (left) and Danai Gurira (right) reprised their roles after being absent since 2018 and 2020, respectively.

The opening musical score differs from previous episodes because original composer Bear McCreary returned to re-record a new version with a live orchestra. Norman Reedus suffered a concussion on set while filming the episode after hitting his head, although the black-eye his character receives was already in the script prior to this happening. Chandler Riggs, whose character, Carl Grimes, was absent from the show since season 8, surprised the cast and crew on the last day of filming and can be seen in the background as a farmer toward the final scene at Hilltop. The opening scene in the hospital was noted for its many visual connections to previous seasons: a walker uses a rock to break a glass door ("Guts"), Judith is protected in her hospital room by a stretcher (her father is saved in a similar way in "TS-19"), and the Coalition gathers for a dinner as a family (a dream sequence seen in "The Day Will Come When You Won't Be").

Production on the episode wrapped in April 2022 except for the scene featuring Rick and Michonne, which was filmed in August. The scene was written by Scott M. Gimple, who is the showrunner on their spin-off series, The Walking Dead: The Ones Who Live, and was shot over two days in Georgia. The final moments of the episode features a montage of scenes from every prior season of the series that includes past cast members while a voice-over orbits around a single line: "We're the ones who live." While many of the voices uttering this mantra are spoken by characters already in season 11, such as Daryl and Maggie, several former actors recorded lines for the montage also. This includes the voices of former Walking Dead actors Michael Cudlitz (Abraham), Laurie Holden (Andrea), Lennie James (Morgan), Sonequa Martin-Green (Sasha), Chandler Riggs (Carl), and Steven Yeun (Glenn).

On its original airing, advertisements for Autodesk, Deloitte, DoorDash, Maximum Effort, and Ring were specifically designed to accompany the episode. The ads, jointly produced by AMC and Ryan Reynolds' production company Maximum Effort, featured zombified versions of Walking Dead characters, including Milton Mamet (Dallas Roberts), Andrea (Laurie Holden), Rodney (Joe Ando-Hirsh) and Gareth (Andrew J. West).

Eleanor Matsuura's baby bump is visible during her last scene as Yumiko following the one year time jump. Matsuura alluded that given the Commonwealth's healthcare and her brother, Yumiko may have received in vitro fertilization to have a baby with Magna (Nadia Hilker).

In Norman Reedus' closing scene, episode director and special make-up effects artist Greg Nicotero makes a cameo as a walker stumbling along the road dressed in a striped shirt; Nicotero has portrayed a walker numerous times throughout the series.

== Reception ==
=== Critical ===
The episode received generally positive reviews from critics. On the review aggregator website Rotten Tomatoes, 67% of 21 critics' reviews are positive, with an average rating of 7.3/10. The website's consensus reads: "The Walking Dead finally shuffles off its mortal coil long past its peak, but this finale suffices as an emotionally satisfying sendoff."

=== Ratings ===
The episode achieved a viewership of 2.27 million views in the United States on its original air date. It marked the highest viewership of the season and was the highest-rated episode since "Home Sweet Home" on February 28, 2021.
