= Jason Butler Harner =

American actor (born 1970)

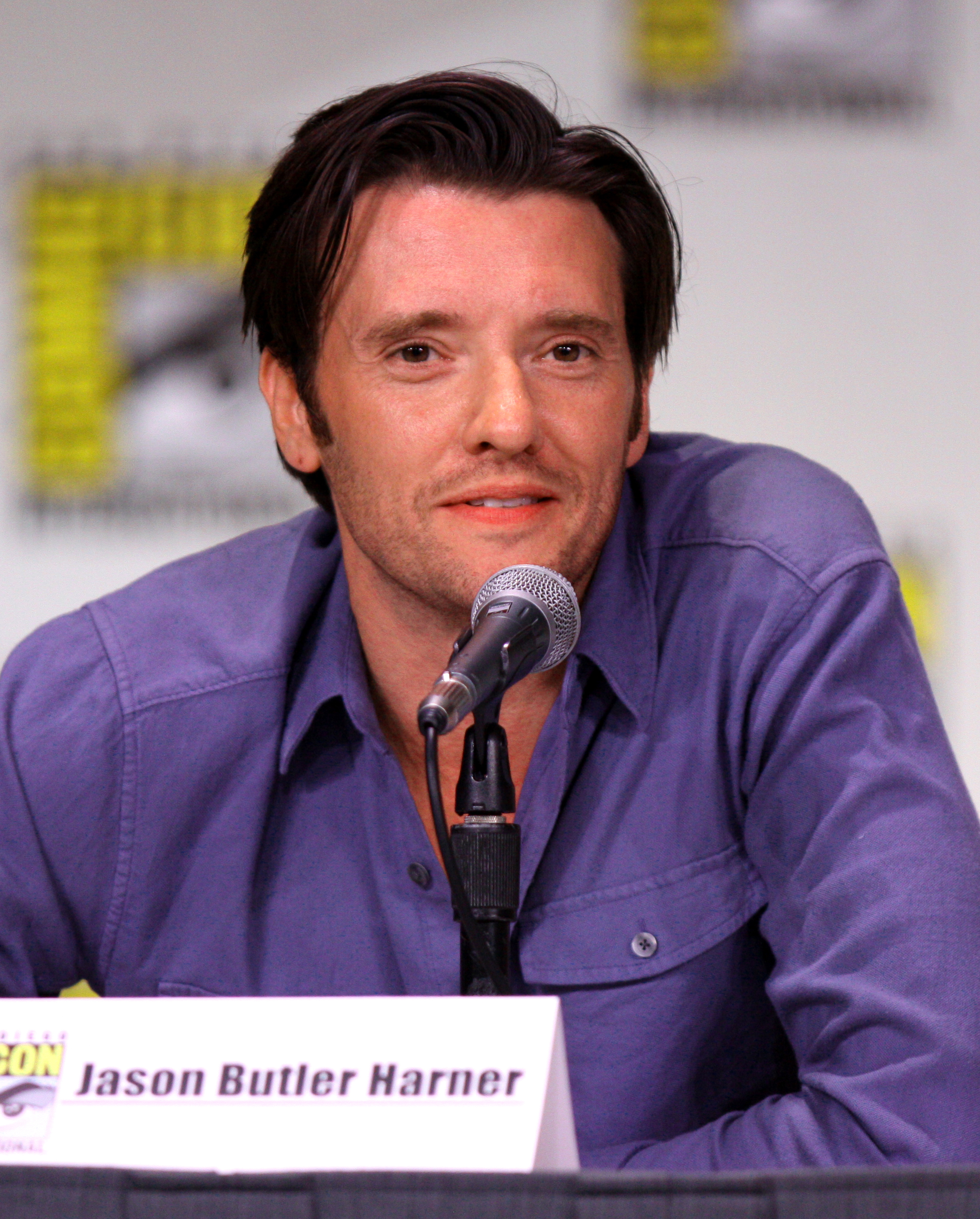
- Harner in 2011
- Born: October 9, 1970 (age 56); Elmira, New York, U.S.
- Education: Virginia Commonwealth University (BFA); New York University (MFA)
- Occupation: Actor
- Years active: 2000–present
- Spouse: Mickey Rapkin

Jason Thomas Butler Harner (born October 9, 1970) is an American actor known for his role as FBI Special Agent Roy Petty in Ozark.

== Life and career ==
Harner was born in Elmira, New York and grew up in suburban Northern Virginia, where he saw a handful of plays at Washington, D.C.’s Arena Stage. His middle name Butler is his mother’s maiden name. He graduated from T. C. Williams High School, Alexandria, Virginia, in 1988. Although Harner was the president of his high school drama club, he spent his time building sets rather than acting.

At 17, after graduating from high school, he worked as an usher at the Eisenhower Theater, part of the Kennedy Center in Washington, D.C.

He graduated from VCU with a Bachelor of Fine Arts in acting in 1992. After graduating from VCU, he was an apprentice at Actors Theatre of Louisville; he subsequently moved to New York City and received a Master of Fine Arts in the Graduate Acting Program from Tisch School of the Arts in 1997, where he was taught by Ron Van Lieu. Harner returned to VCU as a Master Teacher during their 2007-08 Guest Artist program.

Harner completed filming for Changeling in December 2007. He played Gordon Stewart Northcott, a serial killer responsible for the Wineville Chicken Coop murders.

Besides portraying Agent Roy Petty in Ozark, he has also appeared in Sugar, The Handmaid's Tale, Clipped, Scandal, Homeland, Ray Donovan, Rabbit Hole, Next, High Maintenance, and Fringe. He was cast as the regular character Silas Hunton on the cable series Possible Side Effects, until Showtime cancelled the series in April 2008. He plays Associate Warden Elijah Bailey "E.B." Tiller on the Fox series Alcatraz which debuted in January 2012.

He made his Broadway debut in Tom Stoppard's landmark trilogy "The Coast of Utopia" at Lincoln Center Theatre playing Ivan Turgenev over 50 years. He also appeared on Broadway in the 2016 revival of "The Crucible," directed by Ivo VonHove, and starring Ben Whishaw, Sophie Okenedo, Saoirse Ronan and opposite Janet McTeer in the 2018 world premiere of "Bernhardt/Hamlet" at the Roundabout Theatre. He made his London theater debut in February 2010 in the Lanford Wilson play Serenading Louie at Donmar Warehouse, London, England. He has been nominated for two Drama Desk Awards ("The Paris Letter" and "The Village Bike") and earned an OBIE Award for his work in Ivo VonHove's production of "Hedda Gabler" opposite Elizabeth Marvel at New York Theatre Workshop. He starred opposite Sally Field in "The Glass Menagerie" at the Kennedy Center, Carey Mulligan in "Through the Glass Darkly" at the Atlantic Theatre, Greta Gerwig in "The Village Bike," Annette Bening and Sarah Paulson in "The Cherry Orchard" at Mark Taper Forum, Sarah Paulson and Bobby Cannavale in "The Gingerbread House" at the Rattlestick Theatre. He has taught Shakespeare at CalArts University. During his stay in London, Harner read Michael Chabon's Manhood for Amateurs on BBC Book of the Week in April 2010.

In 2023, Harner produced and co-starred in the short film The Anne Frank Gift Shop, written and directed by his husband, Mickey Rapkin. It was shortlisted for Best Live Action Short Film at the 96th Academy Awards.

== Theatrical career ==
- 1990: In What I Did Last Summer play by A. R. Gurney (Shafer Street Theatre, Richmond, Virginia).
- May 1994: In Loved Less (The History of Hell) play by Brian Jucha (Via Theater Downtown Art Company, New York City, New York).
- 1997: In Hydriotaphia, or the Death of Dr. Browne play by Tony Kushner.
- June 1997: Plays Sir Henry Guildford/Page/Garter/King of Arms Henry VIII play by William Shakespeare (Joseph Papp Public Theater/New York Shakespeare Festival, New York City, New York).
- July 1998: Plays Demarais the servant in Transit of Venus play by Maureen Hunter (Berkshire Theatre Festival, Stockbridge, Massachusetts)
- October 1999: Plays Donalbain/Murderer in Macbeth play by William Shakespeare (Joseph Papp Public Theater/New York Shakespeare Festival, New York City, New York).
- October 1999: Plays Thomas Armstrong/Phil in An Experiment with an Air Pump play by Shelagh Stephenson (Manhattan Theatre Club Stage I, New York City, New York).
- January 2000: Plays Young Housman opposite James Cromwell in the American premiere of The Invention of Love play by Tom Stoppard (American Conservatory Theater, San Francisco, California).
- September 2000: Plays Johnny Boyle in Juno and the Paycock play by Seán O'Casey (Gramercy Theatre, New York City, New York).
- April 2001: Plays Barnett opposite Amy Ryan in Crimes of the Heart play by Beth Henley (Second Stage Theatre, New York City, New York).
- February 2003: Plays David Craig in Observe the Sons of Ulster Marching Towards the Somme play by Frank McGuinness (Mitzi E. Newhouse Theater, New York City, New York).
- September 2003: Plays Hamlet in Hamlet play by William Shakespeare (Dallas Theater Center, Dallas, Texas).
- January 2004: Plays Ed in Five Flights play by Adam Bock (Rattlestick, New York City, New York).
- April 2004: Plays Harlequin/Tyler/Stage Crew in Mr. Fox: A Rumination play by Bill Irwin (Peter Norton Space, New York City, New York).
- August 2004: Plays Tom Wingfield opposite Sally Field in The Glass Menagerie play by Tennessee Williams (The Kennedy Center, Washington, DC).
- September 2004: Plays Tesman opposite Elizabeth Marvel in Hedda Gabler play by Henrik Ibsen (New York Theatre Workshop, New York City, New York).
- April 2005: Plays David in Orange Flower Water play by Craig Wright (Theater for the New City, New York City, New York).
- June 2005: Plays Young Anton/Burt Sarris opposite John Glover in The Paris Letter play by Jon Robin Baitz (Laura Pels Theatre, New York City, New York).
- November 2005: Plays Tad Rose in The Ruby Sunrise opposite Marin Ireland, Richard Masur and Maggie Siff play by Rinne Groff (Joseph Papp Public Theater/Martinson Hall, New York City, New York).
- March 2006: Plays Trofimov opposite Annette Bening and Alfred Molina in The Cherry Orchard play by Anton Chekhov (Mark Taper Forum, Los Angeles, California).
- October 2006: Plays Sterling opposite Dylan Baker, Joanna Gleason, Brian d'Arcy James, David Rakoff and Joey Slotnick in The Cartells: A Prime Time Soap . . . Live play by Douglas Carter Beane (Drama Dept. and Comix, New York City, New York).
- November 2006: Plays Ivan Turgenev in the trilogy The Coast of Utopia: Voyage, The Coast of Utopia: Shipwreck, and Coast of Utopia: Salvage plays by Tom Stoppard (Lincoln Center Theater, New York City, New York).
- July 2007: Plays Hildy opposite Richard Kind in The Front Page play by Ben Hecht and Charles MacArthur (Williamstown Theatre Festival, Williamstown, Massachusetts).
- April 2009: Plays Brian opposite Bobby Cannavale, Jackie Hoffman, and Sarah Paulson in The Gingerbread House play by Mark Schultz (Rattlesticks Playwrights Theater, New York City, New York).
- August 2009: Plays central role of 'Stage Manager' in Our Town play by Thornton Wilder (Barrow Street Theatre, New York City, New York).
- February 2010: Plays Alex opposite Jason O'Mara in Serenading Louie play by Lanford Wilson (Donmar Warehouse, London, England).
- October 2010: Plays opposite Glenn Close, Victor Garber, John Benjamin Hickey, Joe Mantello, Jack McBrayer, Michael Stuhlbarg, and Patrick Wilson in a staged reading of The Normal Heart directed by Joel Grey play by Larry Kramer (Walter Kerr Theatre, New York, New York).
- March 2011: Plays opposite Dennis Staroselsky in a staged reading of The Skin of Our Teeth directed by Anthony Rapp play by Thornton Wilder (Wimberly Theatre of the Boston Center for the Arts, Boston, Massachusetts).
- May 2011: Plays Martin opposite Carey Mulligan and Chris Sarandon in Through a Glass Darkly directed by David Leveaux play by Jenny Worton based on film by Ingmar Bergman (New York Theatre Workshop, New York, New York).
- March–April 2016: Plays Rev. Samuel Parris in Arthur Miller's The Crucible opposite Ben Whishaw, Saoirse Ronan, and Jenny Jules, in production directed by Ivo van Hove (Walter Kerr Theatre, New York, New York).
- November 2026: Plays Judge Kentley in Patrick Hamilton's Rope, opposite Corey Fogelmanis, Elizabeth Gillies, Cameron Monaghan, Graham Phillips, and James Waterston in production directed by Scott Elliott (Theater at St. Clement's, New York, New York).

== Filmography ==
=== Films ===
Year	Title	Role	Notes
2000	Trifling with Fate	Walter Skritcher (Artist Who Doesn't Know His Muse)	
2001	The 3 Little Wolfs	Elliot Wolf	
2002	Garmento	Jasper Judson	
2004	Nylon	Stephan	
2006	The Good Shepherd	Teletype Communications Officer	
2007	Next	Jeff Baines	
2008	New Orleans, Mon Amour	Unknown	
2008	Changeling	Gordon Northcott	
2009	The Taking of Pelham 1 2 3	Mr. Thomas	
2010	The Extra Man	Otto Bellman	
2011	Kill the Irishman	Art 'Snep' Sneperger	
2011	Letters from the Big Man	Sean	
2011	The Green	Michael	
2014	Non-Stop	Kyle Rice	
2015	Blackhat	George Reinker	
2015	The Family Fang	Young Caleb Fang	
2023	The Anne Frank Gift Shop	Jack	Short film

=== Television ===
Year	Title	Role	Notes
2000	Guiding Light	Palace Aide	Episode: "May 19, 2000"
2002	Law & Order	Bernard Noah	Episode: "American Jihad"
2002	Law & Order: Criminal Intent	Bob	Episode: "Phantom"
2004	Hope & Faith	Ronnie Fuller	Episode: "Prom and Circumstance (Almost Paradise)"
2006	Law & Order: Special Victims Unit	Greg Hartley	Episode: "Clock"
2006	The Closer	Sammy Rawley	Episode: "The Other Woman"
2008	John Adams	Oliver Wolcott Jr.	Episode: "Unnecessary War"
2008	Moonlight	Lance	Episode: "The Mortal Cure"
2008	Fringe	Steig Brothers	"Pilot"
2009	The Good Wife	William Ericcson	"Stripped"
2009	Law & Order	Nathan Reese	"Rapture"
2010	CSI: Crime Scene Investigation	Daniel Moore	"418/427"
2012	Alcatraz	Associate Warden E.B. Tiller	Regular cast
2012	The Newsroom	Lewis	"We Just Decided To"
2013	Homeland	Paul Franklin	Episodes: "A Red Wheelbarrow", "Game On", "Tower of David"
2013	Betrayal	Zarek	Episodes: "...One More Shot", "...We're Not Going to Bailey's Harbor.", "...Nice Photos", "...That Is Not What Ships Are Built For"
2014	The Blacklist	Walter Gary Martin	4 episodes
2015	Scandal	Ian McLeod	Episodes: "Gladiators Don't Run" and "Run"
2015	Ray Donovan	Varick Strauss	Season 3
2017	Elementary	Ballard Clifton	Guest role (Season 5)
2017–2018	Ozark	FBI Special Agent Roy Petty	Seasons 1-2
2020	neXt	Ted LeBlanc	Regular cast
2022	The Walking Dead	Toby Carlson	Episodes: "Warlords" and "The Rotten Core"
2022	The Handmaid's Tale	Commander MacKenzie	Season 5
2023	Rabbit Hole	Miles Valence	Season 1
2024	Sugar	Henry Thorpe	4 episodes
2024	Clipped	Glenn Bunting	2 episodes
2024	Monsters: The Lyle and Erik Menendez Story	Detective Les Zoeller	4 episodes
2025–2026	All's Fair	Sebastian	3 episodes
2026	The Lincoln Lawyer	Detective Kent Drucker	Season 4

== Other works ==
Harner narrated the audiobook version of Dark Prophecy: A Level 26 Thriller Featuring Steve Dark by Anthony Zuiker and Duane Swierczynski, ISBN 978-0-525-95185-8 and The Adderall Diaries: A Memoir of Moods, Masochism, and Murder by Stephen Elliott, ISBN 978-1-55597-570-8.

== Awards ==
- Nominated for a 2006 Drama Desk Award for the Laura Pels Theatre's production of The Paris Letter.
- Received 2005 Obie Award for his performance in the controversial production of Hedda Gabler at New York Theatre Workshop.
