= The Blacklist season 7 =

Season of television series

The Blacklist
- Season 7
- No. of episodes: 19

Release
- Original network: NBC
- Original release: October 4, 2019 – May 15, 2020

Season chronology
- ← Previous; Season 6 Next → Season 8

The seventh season of the American crime thriller television series The Blacklist premiered on NBC on Friday, October 4, 2019, at 8.00 p.m. The season was originally set to contain 22 episodes. The impact of the COVID-19 pandemic forced the show to shut down production; the season was cut to 19 episodes, with the season finale containing some animated sections to complete the episode.

The seventh season was produced by Davis Entertainment, Universal Television and Sony Pictures Television, and executive produced by Jon Bokenkamp, John Davis, John Eisendrath, John Fox and Joe Carnahan.

== Premise ==
At the end of previous season, Raymond (James Spader) is kidnapped by Katarina Rostova (Laila Robins), Liz's mother and former Russian agent who wants the information about being framed by her closest people and hunted by Townsend's Directive. Her conflict with him also enters the conflict with Elizabeth and FBI Task Force. During the season, Katarina disguises as friendly neighbour to Liz to enter into her life. When Liz discovers more about her past and relationships with Raymond, her father Dom Wilkinson (Brian Dennehy), and Ilya Kozlov (Brett Cullen), this forces her to choose the side: Raymond or Rostova.

== Cast ==
=== Main cast ===
- James Spader as Raymond "Red" Reddington
- Megan Boone as Elizabeth Keen
- Diego Klattenhoff as Donald Ressler
- Harry Lennix as Harold Cooper
- Amir Arison as Aram Mojtabai
- Hisham Tawfiq as Dembe Zuma

=== Recurring ===
- Laila Robins as Katarina Rostova
- Natalie Paul as Francesca Campbell
- Elizabeth Bogush as Elodie Radcliffe
- Laura Sohn as Alina Park
- Clark Middleton as Glen Carter
- Brett Cullen as Frank Bloom / Ilya Kozlov
- Jonathan Holtzman as Chuck
- Anthony Michael Hall as Robby Ressler

== Episodes ==
No. overall	No. in season	Title	Blacklist guide	Directed by	Written by	Original release date	US viewers (millions)
134	1	"Louis T. Steinhil"	No. 27	Bill Roe	John Eisendrath & Jon Bokenkamp	October 4, 2019	4.05
Reddington is drugged and kidnapped by Katarina Rostova in Paris. Dembe looks for clues related to his abduction. The task force searches for a blacklister, "The Illusionist" Louis T. Steinhil (David Meunier), who might be connected to Red's kidnapping. Meanwhile, Liz and Ressler reveal Reddington's true identity to Cooper and Aram.
135	2	"Louis T. Steinhil: Conclusion"	No. 27	Cort Hessler	Lukas Reiter	October 11, 2019	3.78
The task force members continue to search for Reddington as he is held captive by Liz's mother, Katarina Rostova. Later on, Reddington escapes captivity with help from one of Rostova's crew, only to realize they intentionally let him escape in order to lead Rostova to her father, Dom. Reddington later realizes that Rostova is not the only one searching for answers about his past. The episode ends with Liz getting her daughter ready for school while Katarina Rostova, whom Liz does not know, moves in next door.
136	3	"Les Fleurs Du Mal"	No. 151	Lisa Robinson	Kelli Johnson & Taylor Martin	October 18, 2019	3.57
The task force enlists Aram to go undercover to find a blacklister who seeks to thrill wealthy people with deadly entertainment acts. Meanwhile, Reddington speaks to an associate to settle a score. With her identity unknown to Liz, Rostova continues to ingratiate herself in Liz's life.
137	4	"Kuwait"	None	Stephanie Marquardt	Sean Hennen	October 25, 2019	3.61
Back in 1989, Cooper was in the Navy when his fellow Officer Daniel Hutton was taken hostage and presumed to be dead. In the present day, Cooper is informed that Hutton is alive and had faked his death. Cooper and Reddington travel to Kuwait to retrieve Hutton only to discover that he had turned on his country. Meanwhile, Liz looks into finding a nanny with Rostova's help.
138	5	"Norman Devane"	No. 138	Kurt Kuenne	Noah Schechter	November 1, 2019	3.94
The task force investigates a blacklister who has a long history of using diseases as a dangerous bioweapon. Liz soon discovers that his next victims are students at a boarding school. Meanwhile, Reddington and Dembe travel to Cuba to find a lead in the investigation. Aram contemplates a new relationship.
139	6	"Dr. Lewis Powell"	No. 130	Christine Gee	Sam Christopher	November 8, 2019	4.19
The task force investigates the suspicious death of a scientist who specializes in artificial intelligence who posted a video of him making bomb threats before he went to work. Liz digs deeper and discovers that the video had been altered to look like him by manipulation. Meanwhile, Francesca continues to dive deeper in Reddington's empire with consequences. Liz lines up a new recruit to replace Samar.
140	7	"Hannah Hayes"	No. 125	Adam Weisinger	Daniel Cerone	November 15, 2019	3.98
The task force investigate the mysterious disappearance and reappearance of a governor and discovers that he has been surgically implanted with a child. They soon discover that they are looking for a blacklister who is getting revenge on men controlling the lives of females by surgically putting female organs inside of men. Meanwhile, Reddington closes in on Rostova.
141	8	"The Hawaladar"	No. 162	Paul Holahan	Jon Bokenkamp & Lukas Reiter	November 22, 2019	3.91
Desperate to rescue his friend from Katarina Rostova, Reddington tricks the task force in order to gain information on her location from a hawala broker. Liz becomes suspicious of Rostova after Agnes says she saw something disturbing in the park.
142	9	"Orion Relocation Services"	No. 159	Stephanie Marquardt	Sean Hennen & Taylor Martin	December 6, 2019	3.67
Red, Liz and the task force investigate a blacklister whose job is to help criminals disappear and relocate without a trace. Liz further investigates and discovers the identity of her nanny. Meanwhile, Rostova looks into the memories of her former partner.
143	10	"Katarina Rostova"	No. 3	Daniel Willis	Daniel Cerone	December 13, 2019	3.87
After discovering that her nanny is in fact her mother Katarina Rostova, Liz is hesitant to try to help her flee from Reddington. Rostova reveals that Reddington is lying again about his true identity. The task force closes in on Rostova as well.
144	11	"Victoria Fenberg"	No. 137	Bill Roe	T Cooper & Allison Glock-Cooper	March 20, 2020	5.38
Reddington enlists the task force to help find the blacklisters who scammed him out of priceless artwork. Meanwhile, Aram begins to question his new relationship. Also, Ressler confides to Liz what he knows about her mother.
145	12	"Cornelius Ruck"	No. 155	John Terlesky	Lukas Reiter	March 27, 2020	4.73
Before attending Agnes's dance recital, Reddington travels to a remote location to reunite with an old flame for dinner. Things take a turn when dinner guests start dropping dead and it is up to Reddington to find the perpetrator.
146	13	"Newton Purcell"	No. 144	Michael Caracciolo	Noah Schechter	April 3, 2020	4.67
The task force attempt to seek a blacklister whose MO is attacking highly secured data centers. Meanwhile, Liz begins her side investigation in secrecy against Reddington. Also, Reddington's associate tries to prove his loyalty to him after he mishandles a job.
147	14	"Twamie Ullulaq"	No. 126	Victor Nelli, Jr.	Daniel Cerone	April 10, 2020	4.86
A case becomes personal for Agent Park when searching for a blacklister that might be involved in the disappearance at the Alaska triangle. Meanwhile, Aram enlists the help of Reddington when he begins to investigate his girlfriend, Elodie's background and the fact she might be guilty of murder.
148	15	"Gordon Kemp"	No. 158	Andrew Berger	Jonathan Shapiro & Lukas Reiter	April 17, 2020	4.83
While shopping at a liquor store, Reddington witnesses an armed robbery that claims the life of a female cashier who had just revealed she had been accepted into college. Her death deeply affects Reddington. The task force look for a blacklister who might've been involved in the shooting. Meanwhile, Reddington travels to see Ilya Koslov, who has begun to experience post-traumatic stress following his encounter with Katarina Rostova.
149	16	"Nyle Hatcher"	No. 149	Tessa Blake	Katie Bockes	April 24, 2020	4.83
The task force investigate a murder that might have a connection to an FBI cold case. Liz soon learns that the offender of the two separate cases are connected to the same killer and discovers that his next victim is a prostitute who gave birth to his baby. Reddingtion lends a helping hand to Dembe when one of his friends might be in danger. Ressler's estranged brother resurfaces.
150	17	"Brothers"	None	Mahesh Pailoor	Sean Hennen	May 1, 2020	4.50
In flashbacks to Detroit in 1995, Donald's father, a police officer, is murdered by his corrupted partner, Tommy Markin. A younger Donald Ressler finds out the truth and shoots Markin. The elder brother, Robby Ressler, cleans up the crime scene for Donald. In the present, the Ressler brothers dig up Markin's grave because the field is being developed. However, the Albanian mob, to whom Robby owes money, steals their car with the body. In exchange for the body and absolving Robby's debt, the Albanians want Donald to reveal an undercover agent. Robby tells Donald that he killed Markin with a shovel after the gunshot, making him part of murder. Donald decides to come clean and asks Liz for help to defeat the mobsters. Afterward, as the Ressler brothers prepare to confess their crime, Markin's body vanishes, effectively erasing the evidence against them. In the end, it is revealed that Liz is the one who disposed of the body in order to protect Donald, whom she views as a better part of her life and cannot let go of.
151	18	"Roy Cain"	No. 150	Daniel Willis	Aiah Samba	May 8, 2020	4.55
After his Imam is kidnapped, Dembe is forced to make a decision concerning his allegiance to Reddington after the kidnappers ask for secrets about Reddington. Meanwhile, after a health scare, Reddington proposes to give Liz his criminal empire.
152	19	"The Kazanjian Brothers"	No. 156/157	Michael Caracciolo	Kelli Johnson & Sam Christopher	May 15, 2020	4.13
The task force investigates a blacklister who is an accountant working for well known criminals, who are now after him. Meanwhile, Reddington and Dembe close in on Liz's secret. Liz contemplates a huge decision to choose where her loyalties will be: with Raymond or with her mother. Note: This episode was partially filmed with animation due to production being shut down halfway through the episode's filming from the ongoing impact of the COVID-19 pandemic. For the first time in the show's history, the "fourth wall" was broken as the cast and crew addressed the audience directly at both the beginning and end of the episode.

== Production ==
In March 2019, NBC renewed the series for a seventh season, with the original cast set to reprise their roles. On March 14, 2020, Sony Pictures Television suspended production on the series following the COVID-19 pandemic. The final episode utilizes animation to complete the episode, as it had been in the middle of filming when production was suspended. The actors were able to record dialogue for the animation from their homes. The producers considered having the cast "read their lines while an old fashioned radio appeared on the TV screen, or just putting voiceover to still comic book frames" before settling on fully animated sequences. Thought bubbles and text boxes were also added "to help bridge the gap" between the animated sequences and the live action footage. The animation was created by previsualization studio Proof, Inc in London and Atlanta, and was made to look like the style of The Blacklist comics and old Batman comics. 35 artists worked to create approximately 20 minutes of footage for the episode. Additionally, the plots from the three unproduced episodes were being considered for season eight.

=== Casting ===
Laura Sohn joined the cast as a new Task Force member Alina Park. Joely Richardson had been cast as Cassandra Bianchi. The character has been described as "elegant, charming and ruthless", and is a former lover of Raymond Reddington.

== Ratings ==
Viewership and ratings per episode of The Blacklist season 7
No.	Title	Air date	Rating/share (18–49)	Viewers (millions)	DVR (18–49)	DVR viewers (millions)	Total (18–49)	Total viewers (millions)
1	"Louis T. Steinhil (No. 27)"	October 4, 2019	0.5/3	4.05	0.6	2.76	1.1	6.81
2	"Louis T. Steinhil: Conclusion (No. 27)"	October 11, 2019	0.5/3	3.78	0.6	2.68	1.1	6.45
3	"Les Fleurs Du Mal (No. 151)"	October 18, 2019	0.4/3	3.57	0.6	2.68	1.0	6.26
4	"Kuwait"	October 25, 2019	0.5/3	3.61	0.5	2.64	1.0	6.25
5	"Norman Devane (No. 138)"	November 1, 2019	0.6/3	3.94	0.5	2.84	1.1	6.78
6	"Dr. Lewis Powell (No. 130)"	November 8, 2019	0.6/4	4.19	0.6	2.80	1.2	7.00
7	"Hannah Hayes (No. 125)"	November 15, 2019	0.5/3	3.98	0.6	2.85	1.1	6.84
8	"The Hawaladar (No. 162)"	November 22, 2019	0.5/3	3.91	0.5	2.60	1.0	6.51
9	"Orion Relocation Services (No. 159)"	December 6, 2019	0.5/3	3.67	0.6	2.72	1.0	6.39
10	"Katarina Rostova (No. 3)"	December 13, 2019	0.5/3	3.87	0.5	2.72	1.0	6.59
11	"Victoria Fenberg (No. 137)"	March 20, 2020	0.8	5.38	0.5	2.45	1.3	7.83
12	"Cornelius Ruck (No. 155)"	March 27, 2020	0.6	4.73	0.5	2.57	1.1	7.31
13	"Newton Purcell (No. 144)"	April 3, 2020	0.6	4.67	0.4	2.55	1.0	7.23
14	"Twamie Ullulaq (No. 126)"	April 10, 2020	0.7	4.86	0.4	2.58	1.1	7.45
15	"Gordon Kemp (No. 158)"	April 17, 2020	0.6	4.83	0.5	2.44	1.1	7.27
16	"Nyle Hatcher (No. 149)"	April 24, 2020	0.6	4.83	0.4	2.49	1.0	7.32
17	"Brothers"	May 1, 2020	0.5	4.50	0.5	2.54	1.0	7.05
18	"Roy Cain (No. 150)"	May 8, 2020	0.6	4.55	0.4	2.56	1.0	7.11
19	"The Kazanjian Brothers (No.156/157)"	May 15, 2020	0.5	4.13	0.4	2.15	0.9	6.28
