= Pamela Milton =

- The Walking Dead character
- First appearance: Comic: "Issue #176" (2018); Television: "New Haunts" (2022)
- Last appearance: Comic: "Issue #193" (2019); Television: "Rest in Peace" (2022)
- Portrayed by: Laila Robins

In-universe information
- Occupation: Comic: Politician; Governor of the Commonwealth (former); Commander-in-Chief of the Commonwealth Army (former); Television: Politician; Governor of the Commonwealth (former); Commander-in-Chief of the Commonwealth Army (former); Prisoner of the Commonwealth
- Family: Sebastian Milton (son); Television: William Milton (father)

Pamela Milton is a fictional character from the comic book series The Walking Dead and the television series of the same name, where she is portrayed by Laila Robins.

== Overview ==
Pamela Milton is the leader of The Commonwealth, a community of survivors of the zombie apocalypse. She is the daughter of the late President of the United States. She is intelligent and charismatic, but also completely ruthless, willing to eliminate anyone who gets in her way or threatens her power. Her right-hand man, Lance Hornsby, is her envoy and her enforcer, persuading other communities to join the Commonwealth and doing her dirty work.

She has an adult son, Sebastian, a spoiled manchild who despises her, and in response to her being ousted from power, kills Rick Grimes; in the epilogue of the series, twenty years later, Rick's son Carl visits his father's killer in prison, before later expressing regret that Hershel Greene II has grown up to be just as much of a spoiled man child as Sebastian was.

== Television series ==
=== Season 11 ===
In the episode "New Haunts", at a masquerade ball held by Governor Pamela Milton, a disgruntled former soldier, Tyler Davis, takes Pamela's secretary, Maxxine "Max" Mercer, hostage while denouncing her government. Daryl Dixon gets him to surrender but allows Sebastian to take credit for his capture.

In the episode "The Lucky Ones", Pamela takes a tour of the Coalition's settlements and is unimpressed to hear Alexandria has fallen more than once. After meeting with Oceanside, Pamela goes to Hilltop, where she tries to persuade Maggie Greene to join the Commonwealth. Maggie is suspicious of the Commonwealth and refuses to accept aid from them, to the frustration of several Hilltop residents who decide to go join the Commonwealth. Hornsby is also frustrated by Maggie's decision but insists to Aaron he will persevere, seeking to build up his power to get out from under Pamela.

In the second part finale "Acts of God", Max investigates Pamela and assembles some members of Alexandria to post an article in the newspaper about Pamela's lies.

In the third part premiere "Lockdown", Carol Peletier and Negan locate Sebastian and safely deliver him to Pamela. Desperate, Pamela strikes an uneasy deal with Carol. At the same time, the others engage in a cat and mouse game with Hornsby's soldiers, killing several before they end up in a standoff. In the episode "A New Deal", the standoff escalates when Dixon takes Hornsby hostage just as Carol, Negan, Pamela, and Mercer arrive. Sebastian is later killed by a zombie during a riot instigated by Hornsby.

In the episode "Variant", in the aftermath of the riot, Pamela publicly blames Max's boyfriend Eugene Porter for Sebastian's death. She promises to pardon Max if Mercer cooperates. When Sebastian reanimates as a zombie, a grieving Pamela has Rowan executed and orders Hornsby to feed his corpse to Sebastian as a punishment. In the episode "What's Been Lost", Pamela blackmails Yumiko Ukumora into being the prosecutor in Eugene's show trial, threatening to kill her brother Tomichi if she refuses. After learning of Daryl, Carol and Lance's escape, Yumiko reminds the Commonwealth of how invaluable Tomi is before making the stunning public announcement that Pamela is unjustly persecuting Eugene, and Yumiko will be acting as Eugene's defense attorney instead of his prosecutor.

In the episode "Faith", Eugene goes on trial, creating a great deal of unrest in the Commonwealth despite Pamela's efforts to claim that Eugene had fabricated the tape of Sebastian. In the episode "Family", Princess makes contact with Mercer, who helps the group sneak in and plans to use the testimony of the liberated prisoners to legally remove Pamela from power. However, Pamela catches onto his deception and has Mercer arrested for treason. Pamela draws the Coalition into a trap, killing Tyler and several others before they manage to escape. An enraged Pamela opens fire into the crowd, accidentally wounding Judith Grimes. In an attempt to quell the rebellion, Pamela has a massive herd of zombies led to the city to trigger a lockdown, but the herd contains a number of variant walkers and is able to overrun the Commonwealth's defenses. Pamela orders her soldiers to protect the homes of the elite, abandoning the rest of the Commonwealth in order to save herself.

In the series finale "Rest in Peace", Princess and Max break Mercer out who leads his men and the Coalition forces in confronting Pamela as she barricades herself in the Estates. With the people outside about to be devoured, Daryl gives a rousing speech that causes Pamela's men to turn on her and allow everyone inside. Mercer arrests Pamela for her crimes, but she tries to feed herself to a zombified Hornsby instead. Recognizing that prison is a worse fate than death for Pamela, Maggie puts Hornsby down and saves her. Pamela is then imprisoned for life in her own jail.

== Development and reception ==
Laila Robins was cast as Pamela Milton, the governor of the Commonwealth.

In the series finale "Rest in Peace", Kirsten Acuna for Insider first commented regarding Gabriel Stokes that "Watching Governor Pamela Milton hide inside her estate as she watched her people about to meet a similar fate at its gates probably sent him right back to his lowest moment." Acuna also described how Pamela nearly died in a manner similar to how Carol died in issues No. 41 and 42 of the comics: "As Pamela (Laila Robins) realizes she's lost everything — her son, her rule over the Commonwealth community — she spots her former right-hand man, Lance Hornsby (Josh Hamilton (actor)), has been turned into one of the dead. Feeling like she's lost anyone who ever loved her, she inches slowly toward Lance and considers letting him bite her neck." Acuna noted how a recording of the song "Cult of Personality" by Living Colour is played as Pamela's rule over the Commonwealth ends, "which remarks on the cult status of a leader who is followed without question is a pretty perfect track to symbolize Pamela's rule over the Commonwealth."
