= Laila Robins =

American actress (born 1959)

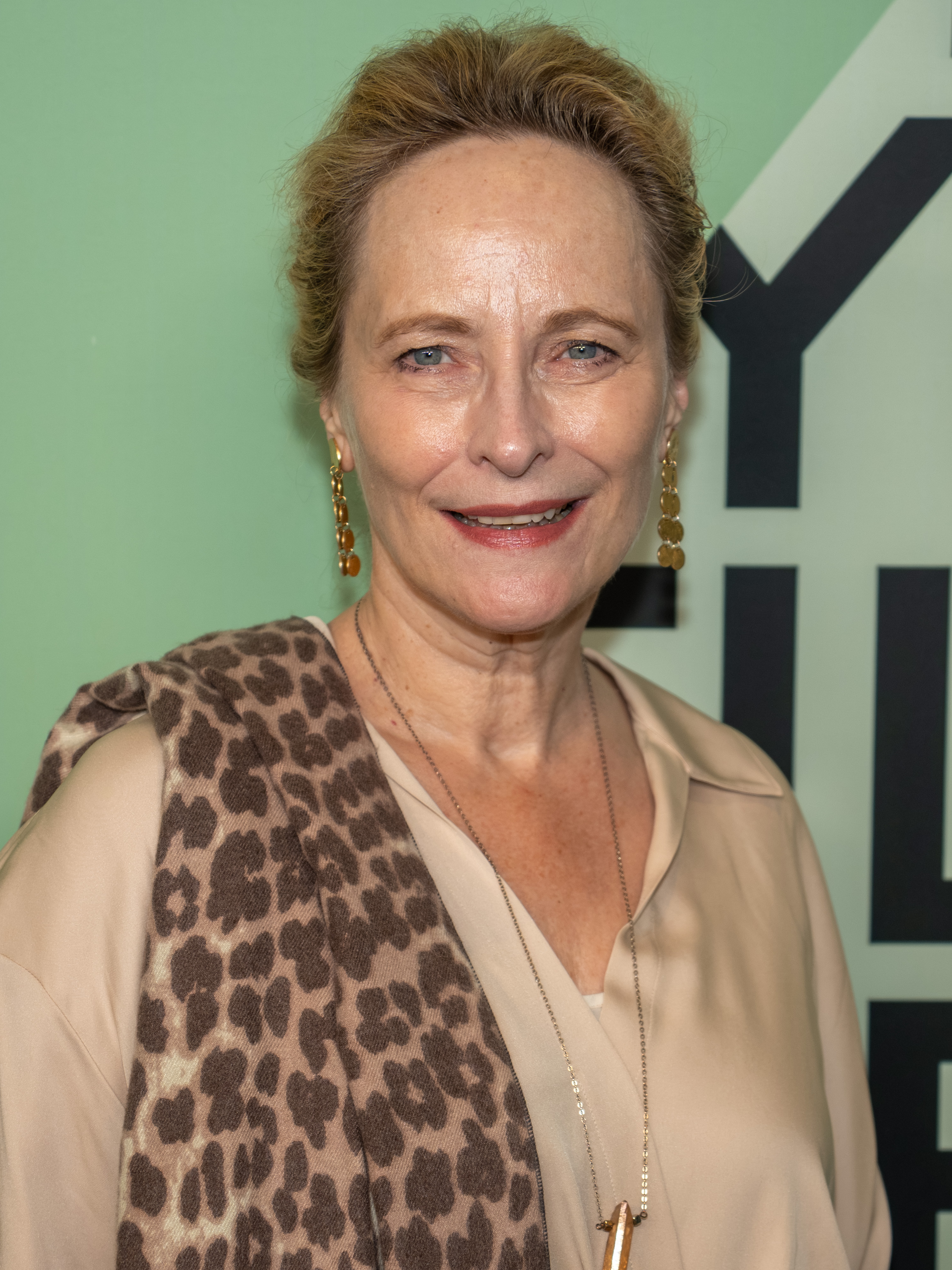
- Robins in 2025
- Born: March 14, 1959 (age 67); St. Paul, Minnesota, U.S.
- Education: University of Wisconsin, Eau Claire (BA); Yale University (MFA)
- Occupation: Actress
- Years active: 1985–present
- Partner: Robert Cuccioli (2000–present)

Laila Robins (born March 14, 1959) is an American stage, film and television actress. She has appeared in films including Planes, Trains and Automobiles (1987), An Innocent Man (1989), Live Nude Girls (1995), True Crime (1999), She's Lost Control (2014), Eye in the Sky (2015), and A Call to Spy (2019). Her television credits include regular roles on Gabriel's Fire, Homeland, and Murder in the First, playing Pamela Milton in the final season of The Walking Dead (2022), and Colonel Grace Mallory in The Boys (2019–2024) and Gen V (2023).

== Early life and education ==
Robins was born in St. Paul, Minnesota, the daughter of Latvian American parents Jānis Robiņš and Brigita Švarca. She received her undergraduate degree at the University of Wisconsin–Eau Claire and attended the Yale School of Drama, earning a master of fine arts.

== Career ==
=== Film and television ===
Robins made her big screen debut starring opposite Steve Martin in the 1987 comedy film Planes, Trains and Automobiles. She then starred opposite Tom Selleck in the 1989 crime thriller An Innocent Man; Welcome Home, Roxy Carmichael (1990); the sex comedy Live Nude Girls (1995) with Dana Delany and Kim Cattrall; and True Crime (1999). On the small screen, Robins co-starred with James Earl Jones in the ABC crime drama series Gabriel's Fire, from 1990 to 1991, and guest-starred on Law & Order, Law & Order: Special Victims Unit, Law & Order: Criminal Intent, Third Watch, Sex and the City, 30 Rock, and The Good Wife. She also played a younger version of Livia Soprano, the mother of mobster Tony Soprano, in two episodes of the HBO crime drama series The Sopranos.

In 2014, Robins starred as Martha Boyd, the U.S. ambassador to Pakistan, in the fourth season of Showtime drama series Homeland. The following year, she was a regular cast member in the TNT drama series Murder in the First, and in 2016–2017, she had a recurring role in Quantico. In 2018 she starred in the short-lived ABC drama series Deception. She had a recurring role as Katarina Rostova in season 7 of the NBC series The Blacklist from 2019 to 2021. She also had recurring roles in In Treatment, Bored to Death, Mr. Mercedes, Dr. Death and The Boys. In 2022, Robins joined the cast of AMC drama series The Walking Dead as Governor of the Commonwealth, Pamela Milton.

=== Theatre ===
Robins appeared on Broadway as Lady Utterword in the Roundabout Theatre Company's revival of George Bernard Shaw's Heartbreak House (2006). Robins's other Broadway appearances were Frozen by Bryony Lavery (2004), The Herbal Bed by Peter Whelan (1998), and The Real Thing by Tom Stoppard (1985), directed by Mike Nichols. (Robins succeeded actress Glenn Close in the role).

Robins has appeared off-Broadway in Sore Throats by Howard Brenton, The Merchant of Venice by William Shakespeare, Mrs. Klein by Nicholas Wright (in which she also toured with Uta Hagen) (1995–1996), Burnt Piano by Justin Fleming, opposite Richard Thomas in Second Stage Theatre's Tiny Alice (2000). and The Film Society by Jon Robin Baitz, among others. She has also appeared in numerous regional theatre productions, such as the 1997 Fiftieth Anniversary production of A Streetcar Named Desire at the Steppenwolf Theatre in Chicago. Robins also appeared as Cleopatra in Antony and Cleopatra at the Guthrie Theater in Minneapolis in 2002. Robins is also a frequent performer at the Shakespeare Theatre of New Jersey, where she has starred in Macbeth, Three Sisters and The Cherry Orchard.

Charles Isherwood, critic for The New York Times, assessed her stage work as Ariadne in George Bernard Shaw's Heartbreak House (2006) opposite Swoosie Kurtz as follows: "...this expert comic actress [Kurtz] may not fit the textbook definition of siren, as Hesione is called, but she may just be the most seductive woman on a New York stage right now...unless that nod goes to Ms. Robins, who locates the essence of her character's shallow allure in a languid, liquid strut and a smile both entrancing and devouring".

Robins has won or been nominated for several awards for her work including the Actors' Equity Foundation Joe A. Callaway Award (1995), for The Merchant of Venice, the 2012 Drama Desk Award, Outstanding Ensemble for Sweet and Sad, the Lucille Lortel Award nominations for Outstanding Featured Actress (2004) for Frozen and Outstanding Lead Actress (2007) for Sore Throats, the 1997 Joseph Jefferson Award Best Actress for A Streetcar Named Desire at The Steppenwolf Theatre, the Helen Hayes Award nomination, 1997 Supporting Performer, Non-Resident Production for Mrs. Klein, and the Drama League Award.

Robins is a guest instructor at HB Studio.

== Personal life ==
Robins has been in a relationship with the actor Robert Cuccioli since 2000. They co-starred in Macbeth at the Shakespeare Theatre of New Jersey as Macbeth and Lady Macbeth, among other plays.

== Filmography ==
=== Film ===
Year	Title	Role	Notes
1987	Planes, Trains and Automobiles	Susan Page	
1987	A Walk on the Moon	Marty Ellis	
1989	An Innocent Man	Kate Rainwood	
1990	Welcome Home, Roxy Carmichael	Elizabeth Zaks	
1995	Live Nude Girls	Rachel	
1996	Female Perversions	Emma	
1997	The Blood Oranges	Catherine	
1999	True Crime	Patricia Findley	
1999	Oxygen	Frances Hannon	
2000	Drop Back Ten	Viv	
2001	The Loneliness of Animals	Annabella	Short film
2002	Searching for Paradise	Barbara Mattei	
2003	Happy End	Irene	
2004	Jailbait	Mother	
2006	Slippery Slope	Michaela Stark	
2006	Things That Hang from Trees	Miss Millie	
2006	A Broken Sole	Passenger	
2006	The Good Shepherd	Toddy Allen	
2008	August	Ottmar Peevo	
2008	The Loss of a Teardrop Diamond	Mrs. Fenstermaker	
2009	Welcome to Academia	Deborah	
2010	Multiple Sarcasms	Lauren	
2012	The Letter	Dr. Tynan	
2013	Blumenthal	Cheryl	
2013	Concussion	Woman #3	
2013	Side Effects	Banks partner #2	
2014	She's Lost Control	Irene	
2015	Grey Lady	The Duchess	
2015	Valeria	Shirley	Short film
2015	Eye in the Sky	Jillian Goldman	
2016	A Woman, a Part	Bernadette	
2017	Island Zero	Maggie	
2017	Impossible Monsters	Dean Gaslow	
2018	The Rest of Us	Dean Patterson	
2019	A Call to Spy	Pirani	
2022	My Love Affair with Marriage	Master of Ceremonies	

=== Television ===
Year	Title	Role	Notes
1988	The Equalizer	Cindy Claussen	Episode: "The Last Campaign"
1989	Dream Breakers	Phoebe	TV film
1990–1991	Gabriel's Fire	Victoria Heller	Main role
1992	Trial: The Price of Passion	Charm Blackburn	TV film
1995	The Wright Verdicts	Rachel	Episode: "Unlucky Star"
1996	Law & Order	Diana Hawthorne	Episode: "Trophy"
1997	Nothing Sacred	Jeanne Cole	Episode: "House of Rage"
1998	Law & Order	Liann Crosby	Episode: "Venom"
1999	Spenser: Small Vices	Rita Fiore	TV film
1999	Law & Order: Special Victims Unit	Ellen Travis	Episode: "A Single Life"
1999–2001	The Sopranos	Young Livia Soprano	2 episodes
2000	Third Watch	Sharon Reiner	Episode: "Journey to the Himalayas"
2001	Witchblade	Dominique Boucher	2 episodes
2001	Law & Order: Criminal Intent	Kit Sternman	Episode: "Enemy Within"
2004	Sex and the City	Audra Clark	Episode: "The Cold War"
2006	The Book of Daniel	Nora Paxton	4 episodes
2009	30 Rock	Gloria Baird	Episode: "St. Valentine's Day"
2009	All My Children	Claire Williams	3 episodes
2009	In Treatment	Tammy Meswick	Recurring role
2009–2010	Bored to Death	Priscilla Antrem	Recurring role
2010	God in America	Anne Hutchinson	Episode: "A New Adam/A New Eden"
2010	The Good Wife	Paige Burchfield	Episode: "Bad Girls"
2011	Damages	Catherine's Doctor	1 episode
2011	Too Big to Fail	Christine Lagarde	TV film
2011	Blue Bloods	Mrs. Lee	Episode: "Friendly Fire"
2011	Person of Interest	Anja Kohl	Episode: "Foe"
2012	Dark Horse	Miranda Teras	TV film
2013	Onion News Empire	Helena Zweibel	TV film
2014	The Money	Ruth Castman	TV film
2014	That Hopey Changey Thing	Marian Apple	TV film
2014	Sweet and Sad	Marian Apple	TV miniseries
2014	Regular Singing	Marian Apple	TV miniseries
2014	Homeland	Martha Boyd	Main role (season 4); 12 episodes
2015	Murder in the First	Jamie Nelson	Main role (season 2); 12 episodes
2016–2017	Quantico	General Katherine Richards	Guest; 2 episodes
2017	Mr. Mercedes	Charlotte Gibney	Guest; 3 episodes
2018	Deception	Special Agent Deakins	Main role; 13 episodes
2018	New Amsterdam	Mrs. Ryland	Episode: "Every Last Minute"
2019–2021	The Blacklist	Katarina Rostova	Guest (season 6); recurring role (seasons 7–8)
2019	The Handmaid's Tale	Pamela Joy	Episode "Useful"
2019	Bull	Colleen McCandless	Episode: "The Good One"
2019–2024	The Boys	Colonel Grace Mallory	Recurring role, 13 episodes
2021	The Equalizer	CIA Director Suri Nance	Episode: "The Milk Run"
2021	Dr. Death	Amy Piel	Recurring role, 5 episodes
2022	The Walking Dead	Pamela Milton	Main role, 15 episodes
2023	Accused	Anne Carlson	Episode: "Billy's Story"
2023	The Crowded Room	Susie	Recurring role, 3 episodes
2023	American Horror Stories	Lee	Episode: "Organ"
2023	Gen V	Colonel Grace Mallory	Episode: "Sick"
2025	Law & Order	Megan Stratton	Episode: "Folk Hero"
2026	CIA	Joanne Kerkering	Episode: "Broken Glass"

== Stage ==
- The Real Thing (1985) ...Annie (Replacement); Plymouth Theatre (Broadway)
- Summer and Smoke (1986) ...Alma Winemiller; Williamstown Theatre Festival (Williamstown, MA)
- Bloody Poetry (1987) ...Mary Shelley; Manhattan Theatre Club (Off-Broadway)
- The Film Society (1988) ...Nan Sinclair; Second Stage Theatre/McGinn-Cazale Theatre (Off-Broadway)
- The Lady from the Sea (1988) ...Cast; Baltimore Center Stage (Baltimore, MD)
- Maids of Honor (1990) ...Monica Bowlin; WPA Theatre (Off-Broadway)
- The Extra Man (1992) ...Laura; Manhattan Theatre Club (Off-Broadway)
- The Women (1993) ...Cast; Hartford Stage Company (Hartford, CT)
- The Merchant of Venice (1995) ... Portia; Joseph Papp Public Theater/Anspacher Theatre (Off-Broadway)
- Mrs. Klein (1996) ...Melitta; National Tour
- Mrs. Klein (1995) ... Melitta; Lucille Lortel Theatre (Off-Broadway)
- Skylight (1997) ...Kyra Hollis; Mark Taper Forum (Los Angeles, CA)
- A Streetcar Named Desire (1997) ...Blanche du Bois; Steppenwolf Theatre Company (Chicago, IL)
- The Herbal Bed (1998) ...Susanna Hall; Eugene O'Neill Theatre (Broadway)
- Fool for Love (1999) ...May; McCarter Theatre (Princeton, NJ)
- Tiny Alice (2000) ...Cast; Second Stage Theatre (Off-Broadway)
- Hedda Gabler (2000) ... Hedda Gabler; Guthrie Theater (Minneapolis, MN)
- Burnt Piano (2001) ...Karen; HB Playwrights Theatre (Off-Broadway)
- Three Sisters (2001) ...Masha; New Jersey Shakespeare Theatre (Madison, NJ)
- Antony and Cleopatra (2002) ...Cleopatra; Guthrie Theater (Minneapolis, MN)
- Resurrection Blues (2002) ...Emily; Guthrie Theater (Minneapolis, MN)
- Fiction (2003) ...Linda; McCarter Theatre (Princeton, NJ)
- King John (2003) ... Constance; New Jersey Shakespeare Theater (Madison, NJ)
- Macbeth (2004) ...Lady Macbeth; The Shakespeare Theatre of New Jersey (Madison, NJ)
- Frozen (2004) ...Agnetha; Circle in the Square Theatre (Broadway)
- Frozen (2004) ... Agnetha; MCC Theater (Off-Broadway)
- Heartbreak House (2006) ...Lady Utterwood; American Airlines Theatre (Broadway)
- A Street Car Named Desire (2008) The Shakespeare Theatre of New Jersey (Madison, NJ)
- Noises Off (2009) The Shakespeare Theatre of New Jersey (Madison, NJ)
- The Dance of Death (2013) The Red Bull Theater (New York, NY)
- The Lion in Winter (2016) Guthrie Theatre (Minneapolis, MN)
