= Lance Hornsby =

- The Walking Dead character
- First appearance: Comic: "Issue #175" (2018); Television: "Out of the Ashes" (2021)
- Last appearance: Comic: "Issue #192" (2019); Television: "Rest in Peace" (2022)
- Portrayed by: Josh Hamilton

Lance Hornsby is a fictional character from the comic book series The Walking Dead and the television series of the same name, where he is portrayed by Josh Hamilton.

== Comic book series ==
Lance Hornsby is the deputy governor of The Commonwealth.

== Television series ==
=== Season 11 ===
In the episode "Out of the Ashes", Eugene tells Stephanie that he'd like to radio back to his group at home, but Stephanie reveals that the radios are government property and that getting authorization to use them is a long and complicated process. They come up with a plan to gain access to the radios secretly, but shortly after making contact with Rosita, they are cut off and arrested. Eugene, Princess and Ezekiel are threatened with deportation from the Commonwealth, but Stephanie calls in a favor from Lance to save them. In the episode "Promises Broken", Lance tells Yumiko that if she becomes a legal counselor for Pamela Milton's cabinet, she might be able to free Tomi and her friends from community service. Eugene and Stephanie later find Sebastian Milton and his girlfriend under attack by walkers, however when they save their lives, Sebastian is ungrateful. The two argue as Stephanie kills another approaching walker, and the argument escalates when Eugene punches Sebastian for his lack of gratitude. Mercer and Lance arrive on the scene and take Eugene into custody after Sebastian accuses Eugene of attacking him. Eugene is imprisoned, where Lance orders him to give up Alexandria's location or he will stay in jail.

In the second part premiere "No Other Way," Eugene arrives at Alexandria with Lance and the Commonwealth Army. Addressing the residents, Lance admits that he's impressed with what they and the other communities have built and offers the Commonwealth's help in rebuilding the community as well as residency for the people in the Commonwealth. Six months later, Lance stands before the Commonwealth Army at the Hilltop as they face off with Maggie. In the episode "New Haunts," months after his visit to Alexandria, Lance helps to prepare for Pamela's masquerade ball. Noticing Lance's struggles to find a suitable wine for the party, Carol helps him out and offers to do further work for Lance in exchange for his help in getting Ezekiel his cancer surgery, a deal that Lance ultimately accepts after the rather eventful party. In the episode "Rogue Element," Lance enlists Carol's help to deal with an unruly farmer named Moto. At the same time, Eugene's investigation into "Stephanie's" disappearance reveals the existence of a rogue element within the Commonwealth that Lance is the leader of. Lance reveals that "Stephanie" is actually Shira, one of his spies, and that he had used Eugene to find the Coalition in order to further his own ambitions. Lance manipulates and shames Eugene into keeping quiet about his discoveries. In the episode "The Lucky Ones," Lance leads Pamela Milton and a Commonwealth convoy to the Coalition communities in an effort to establish a trade deal with the Hilltop and Oceanside. However, Rachel Ward is only willing to sign on if Maggie does and Maggie is hesitant to trust the Commonwealth's intentions. Lance opens up to Maggie about his ambitions to expand the Commonwealth's influence into a series of communities, but she ultimately rejects his offer. Nevertheless, Pamela agrees to allow Lance to keep his deal with Alexandria and to continue working on the other communities, but she warns Lance not to overextend his reach. Lance takes out his frustrations by shooting walkers and tells Aaron that they're going to change the world. At the same time, Lance holds up his end of the deal with Carol by arranging for Ezekiel to have his cancer surgery. In the episode "Warlords," Lance is revealed to secretly be using the work on Alexandria to illegally ship weapons. When one such shipment is attacked, Lance arranges for Toby Carlson, a former CIA assassin, to infiltrate the Riverbend community under cover of a first contact mission to kill everyone and retrieve the stolen weapons. In the episode "The Rotten Core," Toby radios Lance to let him know that the location is secure and that they are searching for the missing weapons. However, things fall apart when the Riverbend residents defeat Lance's forces with the help of Aaron, Gabriel, Maggie, Lydia and Elijah, leaving Lance unable to contact his forces. Carol approaches Lance about Sebastian's heist, but he reveals that he had already known and was covering up for it. In the episode "Trust," in the aftermath of the debacle at Riverbend, Lance becomes increasingly suspicious of the Coalition and forces an inspection of the Hilltop, tying into the time jump in "No Other Way." Although Maggie eventually allows it at Daryl's request, when Lance tries to threaten Hershel into revealing the truth, Daryl, Maggie and Elijah force him at gunpoint to go, leaving him frustrated. Lance's forces locate Leah Shaw, the true perpetrator behind the weapons heist, but Lance decides to hire her as an assassin instead of killing her. In the second part finale "Acts of God," Lance makes his move against the communities, assigning his men to kill Daryl, Aaron and Gabriel while sending more alongside Leah to kill Maggie. However, Daryl, Aaron and Gabriel anticipate the ambush and manage to kill Lance's men, letting him know of the failure over the radio while Maggie, Marco, Elijah and Lydia set a trap that kills several more of Lance's men with only Marco being killed on their side. Finally, Daryl kills Leah in her old cabin and, seeing Lance outside, shoots at him, grazing Lance's face. Enraged by all of his failures, Lance orders his men to take Alexandria, the Hilltop and Oceanside by force, sadistically flipping a coin to determine the fate of the residents of the latter.

In the third part premiere "Lockdown," Lance and his men hunt Daryl's group through an abandoned city while Lance attempts to order Roman Calhoun and Shira to go after the group's children in the Commonwealth. However, this plan is foiled by the efforts of Carol and Jerry while Daryl and Negan kill several of Lance's men and get Negan into the Commonwealth where he tips off Carol about Lance's actions. In the sewers, Daryl's group ambushes Lance's forces, leading to a standoff where the soldiers hold everyone else at gunpoint while Daryl holds a knife to Lance's throat. In the episode "A New Deal," the situation is defused with the arrival of Carol, Negan, Pamela and Mercer. Mercer orders Lance's forces to stand down and Pamela orders Daryl to release Lance into her custody, intending to pin all of Sebastian's crimes upon him as per a deal that she had worked out with Carol. Daryl reluctantly releases Lance, but not before stabbing him through the hand with a knife in revenge for his actions. Lance remains confident that Pamela needs him too much to actually do anything to him, but Pamela tells Lance that he went too far and will be imprisoned to face trial for his crimes. Lance, in turn, threatens to expose "certain alliances" if she goes through with it. Eugene and Max later seek Lance's advice on taking down the Miltons and Lance orchestrates a massacre from behind bars of ten Commonwealth janitors, having Roman and Shira kill them and unleash them upon the Founder's Day Celebration. This results in several people being killed, including Sebastian. In the episode "Variant," Pamela confronts Lance about his actions, and Lance confesses, having done it to make the point that Pamela still needs him. However, Lance insists that he had never intended for Sebastian to die. Pamela flips Lance's lucky coin to determine his fate and then has a zombified Sebastian brought in as well as the corpse of Roman. Much to Lance's horror, Pamela orders him to cut up the body of his henchman and feed it to her son. In the episode "What's Been Lost," after Pamela makes all of their friends disappear, Daryl and Carol reluctantly decide to break Lance out of jail, knowing that he's the only one that could help them find everyone. Much to their shock, they find Sebastian in the midst of Roman's dismembered remains and a traumatized Lance in the corner holding his lucky coin and muttering that there's always a way out. Daryl puts down Sebastian and Lance agrees to lead them to their friends, but he refuses to outright tell them where to look. Daryl remains behind to cover Carol and Lance's escape and Lance begins addressing the likelihood of the upcoming revolution succeeding, obviously angling for a role in the new administration. After an encounter with a herd, the two are rescued from a patrol by Daryl. Finally, Lance leads Daryl and Carol to a hill overlooking a train depot and reveals that the people that have been disappeared are being used in an effort to connect communities across the continent. With Lance's revelation that there's a train that they can follow, Daryl and Carol, fed up with Lance's manipulations and no longer needing his help, attempt to exile Lance for his crimes. Lance argues that he's no longer the man that had caused them so much trouble, that that guy had died back in his cell, but they are unmoved. Rather than leaving, Lance grabs a gun and tries to shoot the two, but Carol shoots Lance in the neck with an arrow, mortally wounding him. With barely a glance at their fallen enemy, Daryl and Carol drive off, leaving Lance to choke to death on his own blood, not even bothering to prevent Lance from turning into a walker. In the series finale "Rest in Peace," it's revealed that Lance had eventually reanimated and joined the herd that's overrunning the Commonwealth. A zombified Lance, Carol's arrow still in his neck, appears at the gates of the Estates where Pamela, having been overthrown, attempts to commit suicide by allowing Lance to bite her in the neck. Recognizing that prison is a fate worse than death for someone like Pamela, Maggie shoots Lance in the head with a sniper rifle, finally putting him down. Lance's body is presumably destroyed when the Estates are blown up in order to destroy the herd completely.

== Development and reception ==
Josh Hamilton was cast as Lance Hornsby, the deputy governor and director of operations to the Commonwealth. Writing for Forbes, Erik Kain noted in his review of the episode "Out of the Ashes", that before being allowed to enter the Commonwealth, Eugene and his friends "go through a brief orientation process where they watch […] Lance Hornsby—talk about the wonders of this newfound Utopia." Alex McLevy for The A.V. Club said that "the Commonwealth remains the most interesting thing going, and now that Lance Hornsby (hi, Josh Hamilton!) is personally involved in the situation, hopefully we'll get a peek behind the curtain at how the power players in this society operate." Ron Hogan for Den of Geek opined that "Everyone in the Commonwealth seems happy at first blush, but for people who spent a lot of times outside of the walls and learned what they’re really capable of, the Beaver Cleaver Americana promised by slimy-smooth pitchman Lance Hornsby (Josh Hamilton) must seem pretty blind to reality." Hogan also commented that "The introductory video, in which a bunch of 'too good to be true' footage of children playing and old people living out their lives cut with the smarmy game-show host delivery of Lance—Josh Hamilton knocks it out of the park—only raises more alarm bells that all the ice cream and children playing in the world won't turn off."
