= Josh Hamilton (actor) =

American actor (born 1969)

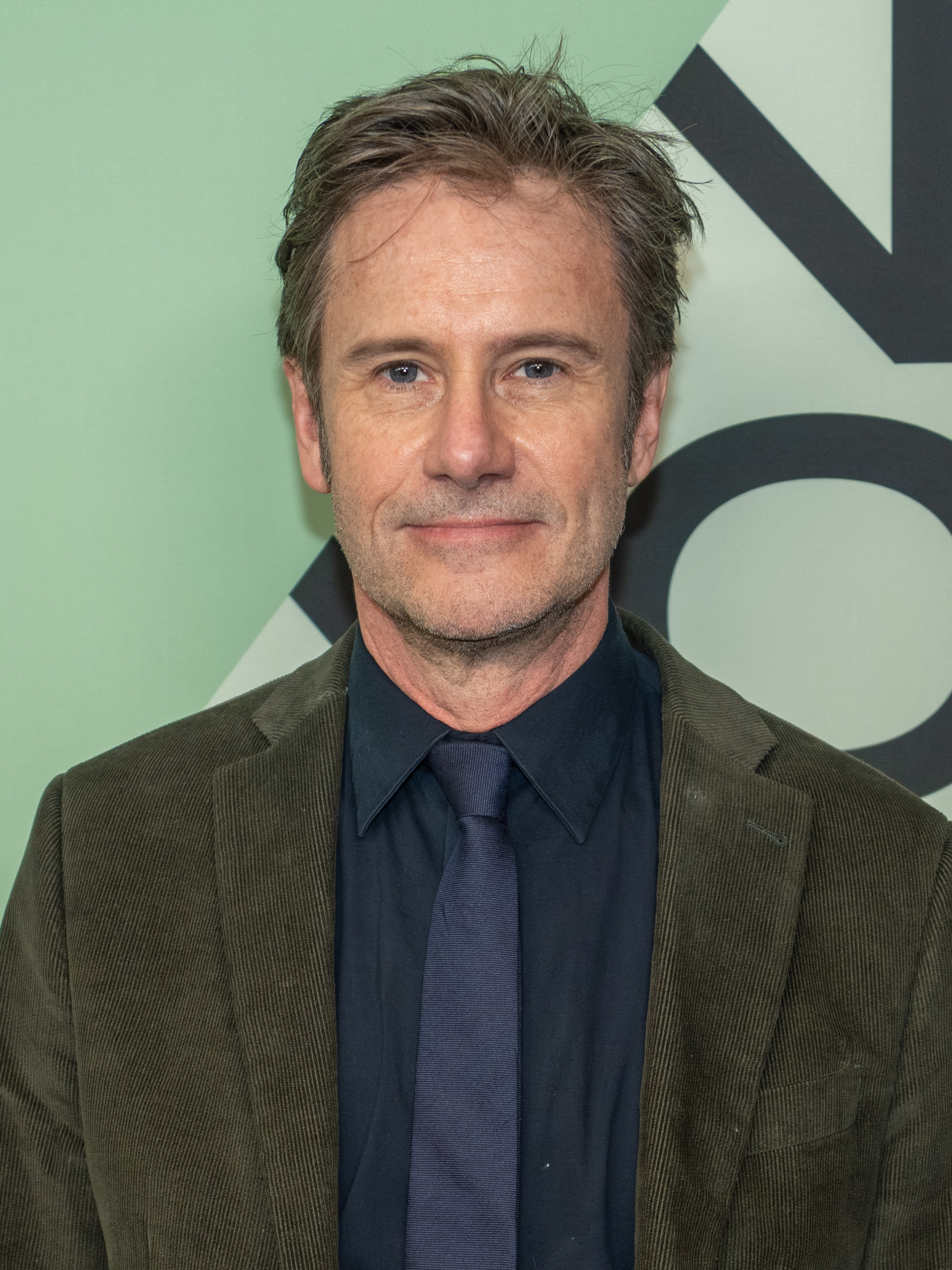
- Hamilton at the 2025 New York Film Festival
- Occupation: Actor
- Years active: 1977–present
- Spouse: Lily Thorne (m. 2005)
- Children: 2

Josh Hamilton (born June 9, 1969) is an American actor. He received a nomination for the Independent Spirit Award for Best Supporting Male for his performance in the hit indie film Eighth Grade. He also won a Daytime Emmy Award as Outstanding Performer in the CBS Schoolbreak Special "Abby, My Love."

== Early life and career ==
Hamilton was born Joshua Cole Hamilton, the son of actors Sandra Kingsbury and Dan Hamilton. His former stepmother was actress Stephanie Braxton.

His Broadway credits include Proof and The Coast of Utopia (2007, Lincoln Center). Hamilton performed in The Cherry Orchard at the Brooklyn Academy of Music in January and February 2009, alongside Ethan Hawke, who was his co-star in the 1993 film Alive. In November 2010, it was announced that both Hamilton (Tom) and Dane Cook (Carter) would star in Neil LaBute's Fat Pig. This marked LaBute's Broadway directorial debut. In 2011 Hamilton starred as Torvald in Henrik Ibsen's A Doll's House at the Williamstown Theatre Festival. Hamilton has also performed on PRI's Selected Shorts, reading Neil Gaiman's story The Thing About Cassandra. In late 2012, he appeared on Broadway in Theresa Rebeck's short-lived new comedy Dead Accounts, starring Katie Holmes and Norbert Leo Butz.

Hamilton starred as Agent Justin C. Garrick in the 2023 Peabody Award–winning film Reality, retelling the story of young American whistleblower Reality Winner's FBI interrogation that ended in her arrest.

== Filmography ==
=== Film ===
Year	Title	Role	Notes
1977	A Good Dissonance Like a Man	Young Charles	Credited as Joshua Hamilton
1984	Old Enough	Timothy	
1984	Firstborn	Brad	
1988	Another Woman	Laura's Boyfriend	
1993	Alive	Roberto Canessa	
1994	With Honors	Jeffrey Hawks	
1995	Kicking and Screaming	Grover	
1997	The House of Yes	Marty	
1997	Drive, She Said	Tass Richards	
1999	Freak Talks About Sex	David Keenan	
2000	Urbania	Matt	
2002	On Line	John Roth	
2002	Ice Age	Dodo / Aardvark	Voice
2002	The Bourne Identity	Research tech #2	
2002	Stella Shorts 1998–2002	Cousin Greg	Direct-to-video
2005	Sorry, Haters	Man	Uncredited
2006	Diggers	Cons	
2006	Outsourced	Todd Anderson	
2007	Broken English	Charlie Ross	
2009	Alexander the Last	Playwright	
2009	Away We Go	Roderick	
2011	Margaret	Victor	
2011	J. Edgar	Robert Irwin	
2012	See Girl Run	Graham	
2012	Frances Ha	Andy	
2013	Dark Skies	Daniel Barrett	
2013	Bottled Up	Becket	
2013	The Wait	Sammy's dad	
2015	Experimenter	Tom Shannon	
2015	Take Me to the River	Keith	
2016	Manchester by the Sea	Wes	
2017	The Meyerowitz Stories	Loretta's Friend	
2018	Eighth Grade	Mark Day	Detroit Film Critics Society Award for Best Supporting Actor; Nominated - Independent Spirit Award for Best Supporting Male
2018	Blaze	Zee	
2020	Tesla	Robert Underwood Johnson	
2021	The Map of Tiny Perfect Things	Daniel	
2021	False Positive	Greg	
2021	A Mouthful of Air	Dr. Salzman	
2023	Landscape with Invisible Hand	Mr. Marsh	
2023	Reality	Agent Justin C. Garrick	
2023	Maestro	John Gruen	
2025	Jay Kelly	Carter	
2025	The Long Walk	William Garraty	
2025	Concessions	Dingo Dan	
2026	Mayday	Dan Hennessy	

=== Television ===
Year	Title	Role	Notes
1983	The Wilder Summer	Willoughby	TV movie
1984	All My Children	Philip "Charlie" Brent Jr.	Episode dated May 3, 1984
1984	ABC Afterschool Special	Swenson	Episode: "Summer Switch"
1985	Not My Kid	Eddie	TV movie
1985	CBS Schoolbreak Special	Todd Johnson	Episode: "The Exchange Student"
1986	Kate & Allie	Rick	Episode: "Winning"
1987	The Lawrenceville Stories	Lovely	Main cast, miniseries
1989	A Man Called Hawk	Jeffrey Stone	Episode: "Hear No Evil"
1990	American Playhouse	Wallace Kirkman	Episode: "Women & Wallace"
1991	CBS Schoolbreak Special	Chip Fulton	Episode: "Abby, My Love"; Daytime Emmy Award for Outstanding Performer in a Children's Special
1992	O Pioneers!	Young Carl Linstrum	TV movie
1996	Don't Look Back	Steve	TV movie
1999	The '60s	Michael Herlihy	TV movie
2000	Sex and the City	George	Episode: "All or Nothing"
2001–2002	Third Watch	Dr. Thomas	6 episodes
2002	Absolutely Fabulous	Serge Turtle	Episode: "Gay"
2003	The Practice	Lawrence Gilbert	Episode: "Victims' Rights"
2006	Law & Order: Criminal Intent	Justin Reid	Episode: "On Fire"
2008	Law & Order	Attorney Reardon	Episode: "Rumble"
2009	Delocated	Actor Jon	Episode: "Member's Only"
2010	Mercy	Bill Rotko	Episode: "Wake Up, Bill"
2010	Louie	Jeff	Episode: "Dogpound"
2012	The Good Wife	Judge Edward Serena	Episode: "After the Fall"
2013	Necessary Roughness	Paul	Episode: "Hits and Myths"
2013	Elementary	Drew Gardner	Episode: "Déjà Vu All Over Again"
2013	American Horror Story: Coven	Hank Foxx/Henry Renard	Recurring role
2014	Gracepoint	Joe Miller	Main cast, limited-run series
2014	Louie	Counselor	2 episodes
2015	Madam Secretary	Arthur Gilroy	Recurring role (season 1)
2017–2020	13 Reasons Why	Matt Jensen	Recurring role
2017–2020	At Home with Amy Sedaris	Dan / Stieger	2 episodes
2018	Sweetbitter	Fred	2 episodes
2019	Mrs. Fletcher	Ted Fletcher	Recurring role, miniseries
2019–2020	Ray Donovan	Kevin Sullivan	Recurring role (season 7)
2020	Law & Order: Special Victims Unit	Trey Harrington	Episode: "Eternal Relief from Pain"
2020	This Is Us	Dr. Mason	Episode: "Strangers: Part Two"
2020	Mrs. America	William Ruckelshaus	Episode: "Jill"
2020	Bull	Mr. Westbury	Episode: "My Corona"
2021–2022	The Walking Dead	Lance Hornsby	Main cast (season 11)
2022	Ray Donovan: The Movie	Kevin Sullivan	TV movie
2022	The Last Movie Stars	George Roy Hill (voice)	Main cast, miniseries
2023	Accused	Dominic	Episode: "Jessie's Story"
2023	The Last Thing He Told Me	Charlie Smith	3 episodes
2025	Something Very Bad Is Going to Happen	Jay Holman / The Intruder	Guest star (Episode: "The Witness")
2026	The Five-Star Weekend	Matthew Shaw	6 episodes

=== Stage ===
Year	Title	Role	Notes
1983	Brighton Beach Memoirs	Eugene Jerome (Standby)	Alvin Theatre, Broadway
1985	Four Corners	Jimmy	WP Theater, Off-Broadway
1986	Eden Cinema	Joseph	Harold Clurman Theater, Off-Broadway
1990	Life During Wartime	Tommy	La Jolla Playhouse
1994	Suburbia	Jeff	Lincoln Theater Center, Off-Broadway
1996	This is Our Youth	Dennis Ziegler	Intar Theatre, Off-Broadway
1996	Wonderful Time	Linus Worth	WPA Theatre, Off-Broadway
1999	The Cider House Rules, Part One: Here in St. Cloud's	Homer Wells	Atlantic Theater Company, Off-Broadway
1999	The Waverly Gallery	Daniel Fine	Williamstown Theatre Festival
2000	Proof	Hal (Replacement)	Walter Kerr Theatre, Broadway
2000	Ancestral Voices	Eddie	Williamstown Theatre Festival
2000	Sexual Perversity in Chicago	Danny	Atlantic Theater Company, Off-Broadway
2001	Music from a Sparkling Planet	Wags	Greenwich House Theatre, Off-Broadway
2002	Evolution	Henry Tollman	Bleecker Street Theater, Off-Broadway
2002	Gone Home	Jack	Manhattan Theatre Club, Off-Broadway
2003	The Violet Hour	John Pace Seavering	Steppenwolf Theatre Company
2005	Hurlyburly	Mickey	The New Group, Off-Broadway
2006	The Coast of Utopia	Nicholas Ogarev	Vivian Beaumont Theater, Broadway
2007	Things We Want	Teddy	Theatre Row, Off-Broadway
2008	1+1	Phil	Hallie Flanagan Davis Powerhouse Theater
2009	The Winter's Tale	Polixenes	Brooklyn Academy of Music, Off-Broadway
2010	A Lie of the Mind	Frankie	Acorn Theater, Off-Broadway
2011	Three Sisters	Andre	Classic Stage Company, Off-Broadway
2011	A Doll's House	Torvald Helmer	Williamstown Theatre Festival
2011	The Cherry Orchard	Pyotr Sergeyevich Trofimov	Classic Stage Company, Off-Broadway
2012	Medieval Play	Sir Ralph	Signature Theatre Company, Off-Broadway
2012	Dead Accounts	Phil	Music Box Theatre, Broadway
2013	Reasons to be Happy	Greg	MCC Theater, Off-Broadway
2014	The Real Thing	Max	American Airlines Theatre, Broadway
2015	Evening at the Talk House	Robert	National Theatre
2017	The Antipodes	Josh	Signature Theatre Company, Off-Broadway
2023	Scene Partners	Hugo	Vineyard Theatre, Off-Broadway
2026	What We Did Before Our Moth Days	Dick	Greenwich House Theatre, Off-Broadway
2026	The Ford/Hill Project	Brett Kavanaugh	Brooklyn Academy of Music, Off-Broadway
