= Acheron: Part I =

- The Walking Dead episode
- Episode no.: Season 11; Episode 1
- Directed by: Kevin Dowling
- Written by: Angela Kang; Jim Barnes
- Cinematography by: Duane Charles Manwiller
- Editing by: Alan Cody
- Original air dates: August 15, 2021 (AMC+); August 22, 2021 (AMC)
- Running time: 45 minutes

Guest appearances
- Angel Theory as Kelly; C. Thomas Howell as Roy; Jackson Pace as Gage; Glenn Stanton as Frost; Okea Eme-Akwari as Elijah; Laurie Fortier as Agatha; James Devoti as Cole; Antony Azor as R.J. Grimes; Kien Michael Spiller as Hershel Rhee; Carrie Genzel as Clark; Marcus Lewis as Duncan; Matthew Cornwell as Evans; Mariana Novak as Female Trooper; Brandon O'Dell as Refugee Man; Mala Bhattacharya as Refugee Woman; Joshua Haire as Squirrelly Man

Episode chronology
← Previous "Here's Negan"	Next → "Acheron: Part II"
- The Walking Dead (season 11)

"Acheron: Part I" is the first episode of the eleventh season of the post-apocalyptic horror television series The Walking Dead. The first of a two-part season premiere, the episode was written by Jim Barnes and showrunner Angela Kang, and directed by Kevin Dowling. "Acheron: Part I" was released on the streaming platform AMC+ on August 15, 2021, before airing on AMC on August 22, 2021. The second part aired on AMC one week later.

In the episode, Daryl (Norman Reedus) leads a mission team to scavenge the military base he discovered. Back at Alexandria, the safe-zone experiences a food shortage. Maggie (Lauren Cohan) tells a story about her old community, prompting a new mission for survival that only Negan (Jeffrey Dean Morgan) can lead. Once on the road, a violent storm erupts forcing the group to descend underground into a subway station where tensions quickly escalate between Maggie and Negan. Meanwhile, Eugene (Josh McDermitt) and his group are relocated to an undisclosed location and go through "level one assessment" by the Commonwealth's paramilitary police.

"Acheron: Part I" also features the debut of Mercer, portrayed by Michael James Shaw, a prominent character from the graphic novels of the same name.

The episode received generally positive reviews from critics, though many felt that splitting the episode into two parts was unnecessary.

== Plot ==
At night, Daryl and Maggie lead a group to an abandoned military base where they scavenge MREs left behind. On the ground of the base, Carol and Rosita help Maggie load the MREs into backpacks, which Daryl lifts through the ceiling with a pulley system. A pulley snaps and Daryl cuts his arm catching a backpack; a drop of his blood lands on a walker, rousing it, and the noise wakes every walker in the room. As the group on the ground fights them off, Daryl lifts them to safety through the ceiling.

When they return to Alexandria, Gabriel reveals that they only have enough food left to last them a week. Maggie suggests they refill their supplies by taking back her former camp, Meridian, which was overthrown by a group that killed most of her people. She forms a team, among them Daryl, Gabriel, Alden, and Negan, to go to Meridian. Most familiar with the area, Negan is chosen to lead the way. When they pass through Washington, D.C., a severe thunderstorm forces the group to take shelter in a subway station, where they continue their route underground through the tunnels.

Elsewhere, Eugene, Ezekiel, Yumiko, and Princess are transported into a compound guarded by paramilitary troopers. The group is separated and interrogated for hours by two Commonwealth auditors, Clark (Carrie Genzel) and Evans (Matthew Cornwell), while Mercer (Michael James Shaw), the General of the Commonwealth Army, observes. The auditors are fixated on what the group's lives were like before "the fall". When reunited at the detainment center, the group decides they need to escape.

As Maggie's group makes its way through the tunnels, they encounter a group of silent walkers with slit throats who sneak up on them, and the group is able to fight its way through. Negan refuses to take the group any further into the tunnel, saying it's too dangerous, but Maggie insists they need to push forward. Negan theorizes that he was only included in the group so that Maggie could kill him away from Alexandria and make it look like an accident. Maggie denies this, but Negan challenges her to kill him there instead, in front of everyone. Maggie refuses, but warns him that killing him is always on her mind.

At the compound, Princess, who has a gifted memory, reveals that two of the guards regularly disappear for a half hour, leaving their armor behind. During this window, Eugene and Yumiko steal the trooper uniforms, and escort Ezekiel and Princess out of the compound. On the way out, the group passes a wall with photos of missing people. Princess recognizes Yumiko in one of the photos, with a note from Yumiko's long-lost brother, Tomi, asking if anyone has seen her. Yumiko decides to stay at the compound to seek answers.

Back underground, the group discovers that Gage and Roy secretly fled, and took all of their supplies. A herd of walkers then appears further down the tunnel and ambush the group. Overwhelmed, the group looks for an escape route and finds a ladder attached to a subway car. Amidst the chaos, Daryl runs after a fleeing Dog as the rest of the group climbs the ladder to safety. Maggie is the last one to ascend the ladder, but her leg is grabbed by a walker. She cries out to Negan for help, but he abandons her, before she loses her grip and falls.

== Production ==
In March 2020, it was announced that pre-production of the final season had been delayed due to the COVID-19 pandemic. Filming for the episode began on February 9, 2021. As with previous seasons, the episode was filmed on location in the state of Georgia. Seth Gilliam revealed on Talking Dead that the subway set took "a month or two" to put together. Many of the photos of missing people included on the Commonwealth's "Wall of the Lost" were submitted by cast and crew members, including David Boyd, who directed thirteen previous episodes of the series.

The episode's title, "Acheron", refers to one of the rivers in Greek mythology that is said to flow through the underworld. The "Acheron" is also sometimes called the river of pain or woe. It is also a real river in Greece.

== Reception ==
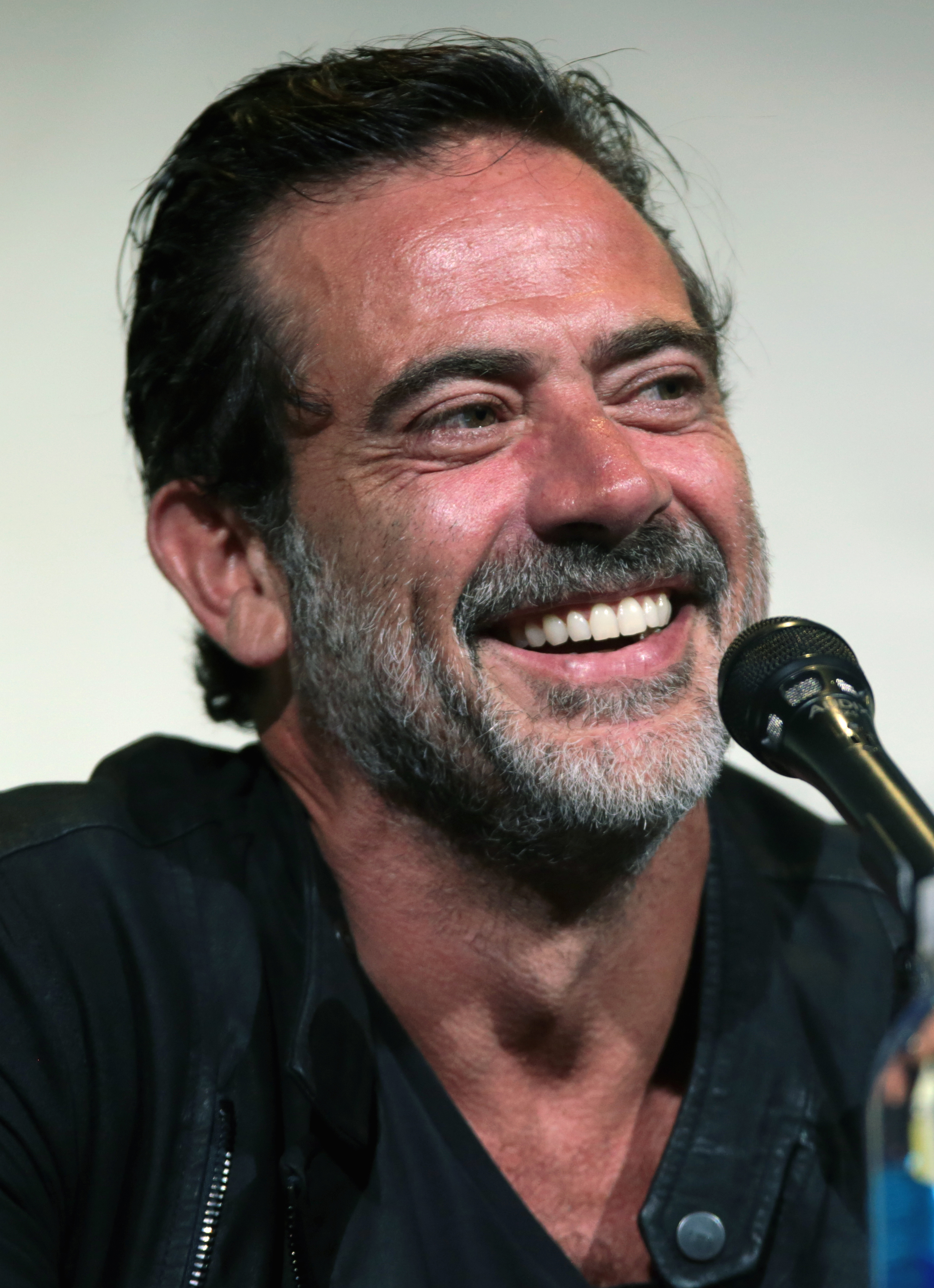
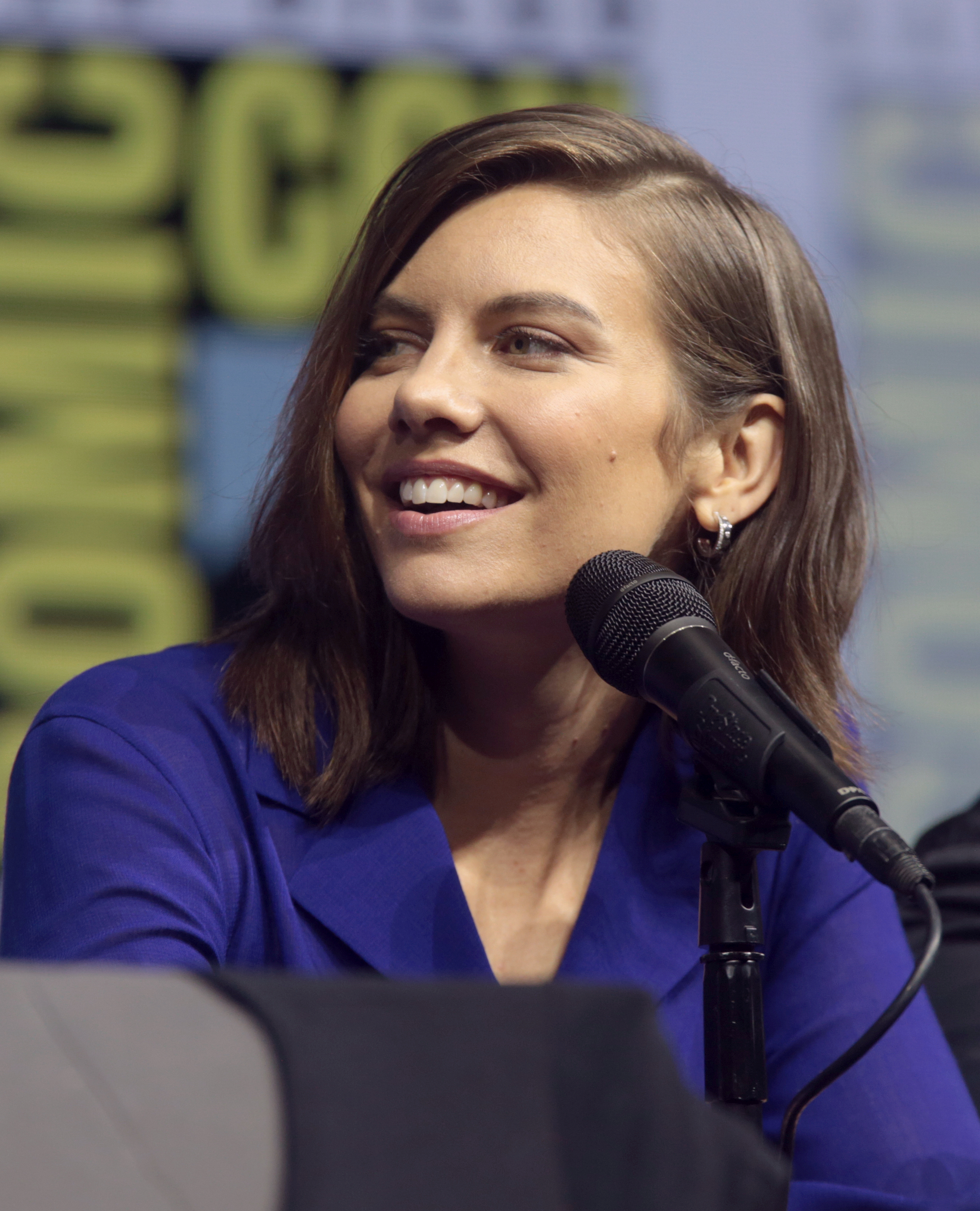
The development of Jeffrey Dean Morgan, and Lauren Cohan's characters were praised by critics.

=== Critical reception ===
The episode received generally positive reviews from critics. On the review aggregator website Rotten Tomatoes, 92% of 13 critics' reviews are positive, with an average rating of 7.0/10. The website's consensus reads: "Maggie and Negan's longstanding feud takes center stage in 'Acheron: Part One', a solid premiere that kickstarts The Walking Dead's final season with some bite."

Ron Hogan of Den of Geek gave the episode 3.5 out of 5 stars, writing that "there are a lot of positives", but added that "after the heights of the previous season's COVID episodes, there's a slight let-down". He also praised the performance of Jeffrey Dean Morgan and Negan's redemption arc, but criticized the character direction Maggie was heading in. Matt Fowler of IGN gave the episode a 5 out of 10, writing: "During a final stretch when things need to heat up, the show feels like it's cooling down. That doesn't mean exciting things aren't waiting in the wings, but the various parts of this particular episode did not make for a promising premiere."

Several critics mentioned that splitting the season premiere into two parts felt unnecessary. Writing for Filmspeak, Zach Marsh gave the episode a C+ rating, writing that: "Aside from feeling very much like half an episode, with the needle of its story not advancing very far forward and a cliffhanger ending, also feels like a significant step down from some of the highs 'The Walking Dead' reached with recent entries." Writing for Forbes, Erik Kain, reviewing both "Acheron: Part I" and "Acheron: Part II" together, called it "a strong season premiere", but felt that it would have been better if the two episodes aired together instead of a week apart.

=== Ratings ===
The episode achieved a viewership of 2.22 million viewers in the United States on its original air date. It marked a 0.1 increase in ratings from the previous episode, becoming the first season premiere in the series' history to have ratings below four points.
