= Stephanie (The Walking Dead) =

- The Walking Dead character
- Portrayed by: Margot Bingham

In-universe information
- Family: Television: Eugene (husband); Rosie Porter (daughter); Michael Mercer (brother)

Stephanie (full name in the television series: Maxxine Porter, née Mercer) is a fictional character from the comic book series The Walking Dead and the television series of the same name, where she is portrayed by Margot Bingham as an alias for Maxxine Mercer while Chelle Ramos was cast as Shira who also uses the alias of Stephanie.

== Comic book series ==
Stephanie was a citizen of the Commonwealth who contacted Eugene over the radio.

== Television series ==
=== Season 9 ===
In the season finale "The Storm", the character is first heard as a voice on the radio asking if anybody is out there.

=== Season 10 ===
In the episode "Bonds", Eugene hears a new radio signal coming in with a female voice. He answers it, but they both agree to avoid sharing specific information. Eugene and the woman talk more, but the woman insists that Eugene should keep these conversations private.

In the episode "Morning Star", Eugene continues his conversations with the woman, who identifies herself as Stephanie, over the radio. He discovers that she also saw the falling satellite and determines she must be relatively nearby. Eugene offers to allow her to select a time and place for them to meet, and she says she will discuss it with the others. Rosita comes in search of Eugene and discovers the unattended radio with Stephanie trying to reach Eugene. Rosita asks her who she is, and Stephanie immediately falls quiet. Eugene hurriedly rushes back in and attempts to get Stephanie to answer to no avail, and he sternly tells Rosita to leave as he continues to attempt to reestablish communication. Rosita later finds Eugene rigging up defenses and encourages him to not give up on Stephanie, challenging him to kiss her, knowing his long infatuation with her. He finds he is unable to, proving Rosita's point that he really does have feelings for Stephanie, and he resolves to keep trying to contact her. He does so singing for her, when he finishes singing, she returns on the radio and apologizes for breaking contact, and gives him coordinates to meet her in one week.

=== Season 11 ===
In the episode "Acheron: Part II", while Eugene is being interrogated at the Commonwealth, a woman enters and asks for Eugene; he raises his hand. The woman introduces herself as Stephanie. In the episode "Out of the Ashes", Eugene tells Stephanie that he'd like to radio back to his group at home, but Stephanie reveals that the radios are government property and that getting authorization to use them is a long and complicated process. They come up with a plan to gain access to the radios secretly, but shortly after making contact with Rosita, they are cut off and arrested. Eugene, Princess and Ezekiel are threatened with deportation from the Commonwealth, but Stephanie calls in a favor to save them. In the episode "Promises Broken", Eugene, Ezekiel, and Princess clear walkers out of abandoned buildings with Stephanie as punishment for using the radio without authorization. A few days later, they are given a new assignment to clear walkers along a perimeter. Eugene and Stephanie find Sebastian Milton and his girlfriend under attack by walkers, however when they save their lives, Sebastian is ungrateful. The two argue as Stephanie kills another approaching walker, and the argument escalates when Eugene punches Sebastian for his lack of gratitude. Mercer and Lance arrive on the scene and take Eugene into custody after Sebastian accuses Eugene of attacking him.

In the episode "Rogue Element", Eugene has entered a relationship with Stephanie and tells her he loves her; shortly after she says she loves him too, she mysteriously disappears. Eugene becomes obsessed with finding Stephanie and breaks into a man's house looking for evidence but fails and Princess insists that she must have broken up with and abandoned him. Eugene soon finds Stephanie again colluding with Lance for an unknown task and gets Lance to confess "Stephanie" was a plant named Shira who was used to get Eugene to confess the location of Alexandria due to too many inconsistencies during the group's auditing. Lance tells Eugene the group is better off now despite his heart being broken by Shira. Eugene is later approached by Pamela Milton's assistant "Max", who reveals herself to be the woman he was in contact with over the radio. In the episode "The Lucky Ones", the woman introduces herself to Eugene as Max Mercer, who was using her mother's name as a code name. Even though she had wanted to meet Eugene, once her brother Mercer got wind of it, he covered it up when Lance also was alerted to her breach in communication protocol, and forced herself to remain quiet upon seeing Eugene with Shira. Eugene storms away due to being too hurt, but eventually goes to reconcile with Max and the pair express lingering interest in each other. In the episode "Trust", Eugene convinces Max to continue to help him on the inside and they kiss for the first time.

In "A New Deal," Max is disgruntled by the Miltons getting away with their crimes again, especially Sebastian. Max tricks Sebastian into confessing his true thoughts on the people of the Commonwealth and secretly tapes him. As Sebastian gives a speech on Founder's Day, Max and Eugene play the tape, causing the crowd to turn on him. However, walkers unleashed by Shira and Roman Callhoun on Lance's orders attack and Sebastian tries to kill Max in retaliation for her actions, pushing her into a walker. Eugene shoves the walker off of her, but it lands on Sebastian and fatally bites him before Judith shoots the walker. In the aftermath, a disgusted Max rejects her brother's attempts to protect her, but Eugene confesses and takes sole responsibility. Eugene is tried for Sebastian's murder while Max coordinates his defense with Yumiko. Although Eugene is found guilty in a kangaroo court and sentenced to death, Eugene and Yumiko are able to raise public sentiment against Pamela Milton and Max's brother Mercer helps Eugene to escape. However, the brewing rebellion is interrupted as a massive herd floods the Commonwealth. Trying to get a wounded Judith to the hospital for treatment, Max joins Eugene and their friends in fighting off the walkers to help buy Daryl time.

In the series finale, Max takes part in the defense of the Commonwealth, rescuing her brother from prison with the help of Princess and organizing the setup of bombs and speakers to destroy the Estates and the massive herd overrunning the Commonwealth. A year later, Eugene and Max are married with a daughter named Rosie.

== Development and reception ==
Margot Bingham was cast as Stephanie, a survivor from an unknown location who communicates with Eugene over the radio for the 10th season, with her name revealed in the episode "Morning Star".

The character appears onscreen in the 11th season, and is also Mercer's younger sister. Chelle Ramos was cast as Shira, a resident and spy for the Commonwealth who also uses the alias of Stephanie. Writing for Filmspeak, Zach Marsh described the introduction of Stephanie in the episode "Acheron: Part II": "Eugene is given one more gift: Stephanie arrives, granting Eugene the face-to-face meeting he thought he had lost." Writing for Forbes, Erik Kain wrote that "just as they’re about to enter in walks Stephanie. Eugene’s face breaks into a big dumb smile. Stephanie looks kind of like a librarian, I guess. Pretty in a bookish, buttoned up way." In reviewing the episode "Promises Broken", Ron Hogan for Den of Geek notes that Stephanie appears to be an "inexperienced fighter".
