= Mercer (The Walking Dead) =

- The Walking Dead character
- First appearance: Comics: "Issue #177" (2018); Television: "Acheron: Part I" (2021)
- Last appearance: Comics: "Issue #193" (2019); Television: "Rest in Peace" (2022)
- Created by: Robert Kirkman
- Adapted by: Angela Kang (The Walking Dead)
- Portrayed by: Michael James Shaw

In-universe information
- Occupation: Commander of the Commonwealth Military; Television: Deputy Governor of the Commonwealth
- Affiliation: The Commonwealth
- Family: Television: Maxxine Mercer (sister)

Mercer (full name in the television series: Michael Mercer) is a fictional character from the comic book series The Walking Dead and the television series of the same name, where he is portrayed by Michael James Shaw.

== Comic book series ==
Mercer is the commander of the military of The Commonwealth.

== Television series ==
=== Season 11 ===
In the season premiere "Acheron: Part I", Eugene, Ezekiel, Yumiko, and Princess are transported into a compound guarded by paramilitary troopers. The group is separated and interrogated for hours by two Commonwealth auditors, Clark (Carrie Genzel) and Evans (Matthew Cornwell), while Mercer (Michael James Shaw), the General of the Commonwealth Army, observes. In the episode "Acheron: Part II", Eugene is taken to a room for further questioning by General Mercer and an auditor. Eugene is intimidated by Mercer, who demands to know where his settlement is, and why he was at the train station. Eugene tells the truth, breaking down in the process. Afterwards, in the daylight, a wagon transports Eugene to a boxcar, where he is reunited with Yumiko, Princess, and Ezekiel. Mercer then tells the group that they have successfully completed processing and will be escorted to orientation. In the episode "Out of the Ashes", Eugene tells Stephanie that he would like to radio back to his group at home, but Stephanie reveals that the radios are government property and that getting authorization to use them is a long and complicated process. They come up with a plan to gain access to the radios secretly, but shortly after making contact with Rosita, they are cut off and arrested by Mercer. In the episode "Promises Broken", Eugene and Stephanie find Sebastian Milton and his girlfriend under attack by walkers, however when they save their lives, Sebastian is ungrateful. The two argue and the argument escalates when Eugene punches Sebastian for his lack of gratitude. Mercer and Lance arrive on the scene and take Eugene into custody after Sebastian accuses Eugene of attacking him. Throughout this event, Mercer treats Sebastian with barely concealed disgust over his entitled attitude and rudeness.

In the second part of the season, after the Coalition joins the Commonwealth, Mercer trains Daryl and Rosita following them joining the Commonwealth Army and he forms a romantic relationship with Princess. Unlike the rest of the Commonwealth's leaders who are corrupt and out for themselves, Mercer proves himself to be an honest man who genuinely cares about those under his command and whom he is protecting, something that has earned him the respect of the newcomers and the Commonwealth's citizens. It's later revealed that Eugene's love interest Max is actually Mercer's younger sister, and that "Stephanie" was one of Lance's spies whose job was to manipulate Eugene in order to find the communities. Mercer had discovered the truth after Max and Eugene's communications were intercepted, resulting in Max not being at the train yard when Eugene's group arrived, but he had protected his sister from discovery. After Sebastian forces Daryl and Rosita to undertake a heist for him, Mercer and Carol come to their rescue. Mercer is furious when he learns that thirty to forty people were sacrificed by Sebastian in his greed, and he personally executes two of his own men who had aided Sebastian for their crimes. However, the group is forced to give Sebastian the money anyways, and Mercer admits to Princess that he is haunted by killing his own men.

In the third part of the season, as people riot after discovering Sebastian's crimes, many of them are shown to be calling for Mercer to take up leadership of the Commonwealth. Mercer privately admits to Rosita that he's well-aware of the corruption at the time and disgusted by it and he offers to help her escape if it ever comes down to that. Rosita helps Mercer deal with a massive herd that threatens the Commonwealth itself while Negan arrives seeking entry to warn Carol and the others about Lance's rogue actions. After learning that Daryl was the one who had sent Negan to him, Mercer agrees to break the rules and let Negan in. Mercer later arrives with Pamela, Carol and Negan to defuse the standoff between Daryl's team and Lance's forces, ordering Lance's men to stand down and convincing Daryl to do the same. As the Coalition prepares to go their separate ways from the Commonwealth, Princess breaks up with Mercer, revealing her past as a victim of abuse and calling Mercer one of the very few good men that she's ever met. However, things go sideways on Founder's Day when a number of reanimated Commonwealth janitors, murdered by Lance's forces, attack, resulting in the death of Sebastian before Daryl, Judith and Mercer manage to put down all of the walkers. Mercer finds his loyalties torn, especially when Pamela threatens Max for her role in her son's death. Eugene takes all of the blame and is put on trial for murder while everyone else is made to disappear, including Princess. At first, although obviously conflicted, Mercer apparently refuses to stand up to Pamela, going so far as to refuse to testify on Eugene's behalf about Pamela's corruption. However, after Eugene is sentenced to execution, Mercer breaks him out and fully sides with the growing uprising against Pamela's rule. Mercer begins gathering troops that feel the same way and makes contact with Princess who reveals the breakout of the people who had been disappeared by Pamela and Lance. With their testimony giving Mercer legal grounds to remove Pamela from power, he coordinates getting the Coalition forces into the Commonwealth, but Pamela quickly deduces his betrayal and has Mercer arrested and imprisoned for it. As a massive herd overruns the Commonwealth, Max and Princess break Mercer out and he helps them get into the Estates where Pamela has evacuated the key personnel, including the doctors that are needed to treat Judith's gunshot wound. Working together, Mercer's forces and the Coalition forces confront Pamela as a desperate crowd bangs on the gates and the herd approaches. Ultimately, Colonel Vickers realizes that Daryl and Gabriel are right and she defers to Mercer who arrests Pamela for high crimes against the people of the Commonwealth and coordinates the successful operation to destroy the herd. A year later, Ezekiel has become the new governor of the Commonwealth with Mercer as his lieutenant governor. Mercer is also shown to still be dating Princess.

== Development and reception ==
Michael James Shaw was cast as Michael Mercer, a resident of the Commonwealth who serves as the general of the Commonwealth military. In March 2021, it was announced that Michael James Shaw had been cast in the series regular role of Mercer. The season eleven premiere "Acheron: Part I" features the debut of Mercer, a prominent character from the graphic novels of the same name. Cameron Bonomolo for ComicBook.com called the character "a brawny badass, the red-armored General Mercer". Bonomolo also described him as "wearing a pumpkin-colored space suit". Writing for Forbes, Erik Kain describes Mercer as " a tough cookie".

Ron Hogan of Den of Geek reviewed the next episode "Acheron: Part II" and mentioned Mercer "who I can only call the Pumpkin King due to the color of his armor". Writing for The A.V. Club, Alex McLevy noted how the "hulking red stormtrooper" Mercer went to West Point, and granted asylum to Eugene and the others. Writing for Filmspeak, Zach Marsh notes how Mercer is "the imposing, orange armor-clad Commonwealth soldier who had a standoff with Ezekiel" in the previous episode, and he knows that Eugene is a bad liar and "encourages him to continue to be honest, implying that the opposite will be very, very bad for Eugene".

Writing for Forbes, Erik Kain reviewed the episode "Out of the Ashes", notes how "Princess tries to distract Mercer which probably makes matters worse". Alex McLevy for The A.V. Club said that "I would happily watch another hour of Princess trying to flirt with Mercer."

In a review of the series finale "Rest in Peace", Kirsten Acuna from Insider describes Mercer being in jail for one episode only to be broken out quickly, as "a nice nod to the comics where the leader of the Commonwealth militia's also thrown into jail" and notes how Princess gives him a heads-up about the explosion "so he doesn't have a wall coming in on him like in the comics".
