= Patriots and Tyrants =

- Jericho episode
- Episode no.: Season 2 Episode 7
- Directed by: Seith Mann
- Written by: Jonathan E. Steinberg and Dan Shotz
- Original air date: March 25, 2008

Episode chronology
← Previous "Sedition"	Next → "Civil War (comic)"

"Patriots and Tyrants" is the seventh episode of season two and series finale of Jericho. It was broadcast on March 25, 2008.

== Plot ==
Jake and Hawkins go to Cheyenne, where they tell Grey to go home to Jericho. Grey says that the whole constitutional convention is a sham.

Beck arrests Heather after he discovers that she had removed information from an aerial scan for radiation.

Hawkins, Cheung, and Jake discover that the nuke will be transferred using an ambulance, in order to not attract attention. They intercept the ambulance, which is being driven by John Smith, the mastermind behind the attacks.

Beck tells Stanley that he is sorry for their loss and tells the Rangers that they are free to leave. At the army headquarters in Jericho, Beck shows his men proof of the ASA conspiracy behind the attacks and tells them to spread the word to prepare for a fight.

In Texas, Chavez tells Jake that Texas is siding with the old US government based in Columbus, Ohio, which will lead to the Second American Civil War. Texan soldiers load the nuke into a truck as Hawkins is loaded into an ambulance.

=== Alternate ending ===
Producers initially shot two endings—one a cliffhanger, one more of an open-ended wrap-up, at the request of CBS, which was still undecided on the future of the show beyond the second season. On March 20, 2008, CBS notified the show's producers that they would not renew the show, and that they would show the wrap-up version. According to producer Jon Steinberg, the version with the cliffhanger ending will appear on the season two DVD set, and may also be made available for viewing on CBS' website.

In the alternate ending, Jake and Hawkins arrive at an airport, Jake gets on the plane but Hawkins sacrifice himself to blow up the tower, and is caught by ASA troops and taken prisoner, to Lumeridge Prison in Colorado. Upon arriving in Texas, Jake is greeted by Governor Todd (a woman) and Chavez, who deduces Hawkins' whereabouts. Jake boards the plane and leaves "To get my friend!"

== Title ==
The title of the episode alludes to a quotation from Thomas Jefferson in a letter to William S. Smith in 1787. The letter reads in part, "What signify a few lives lost in a century or two? The tree of liberty must be refreshed from time to time with the blood of patriots & tyrants. It is its natural manure."
