= List of Jericho episodes =

The Jericho intertitle, written in staticesque font, is accompanied by Morse code specific to each episode.

Jericho is an American television drama series produced by Carol Barbee, Jon Turteltaub, Dan Shotz, Jonathan Steinberg, Josh Schaer, and Stephen Chbosky. The series is set in the fictional town of Jericho, Kansas in the aftermath of the simultaneous nuclear attacks on 23 American cities. Significant story arcs in the first season are the immediate aftermath of detonation of the bombs, the resulting isolation of the town, and confrontations between family, friends, bandits, and neighboring towns. The second season focuses on the arrival of a new federal government, the imposition of a police state, and Jake Green's (Skeet Ulrich) and Robert Hawkins' (Lennie James) attempt to expose the masterminds behind the attack.

Jericho originally aired from September 20, 2006 to March 25, 2008 on CBS in the United States. For the first season, 22 episodes were ordered and separated into two runs of 11 episodes each. The series went on hiatus after the "fall finale" episode of November 29, 2006, and returned with a recap episode on February 14, 2007. The remaining 11 episodes of the first season were then broadcast from February 21, 2007 to May 9, 2007. Because of lackluster results during the latter half of the first season, the show was not renewed. After a large fan outcry CBS ordered seven additional episodes for a trial second season, which began airing on February 12, 2008 and ended on March 25, 2008. Though the second season received favorable reviews, it was ultimately canceled.

Seasons one and two of Jericho have been released on DVD for Regions 1, 2, and 4 and a "Complete Series" DVD has been released for Region 1 and 2. Episodes of Jericho are also available in various new media formats. iTunes, Amazon Unbox and Netflix sell the episodes, and CBS streams the episodes for free on its website. The series did exceptionally well online, which was a complicating factor in deciding to cancel the series.

== Series overview ==
Season	Episodes	Originally released		Viewers (millions)
Season	Episodes	First released	Last released	Viewers (millions)
1	22	September 20, 2006	May 9, 2007	9.24
2	7	February 12, 2008	March 25, 2008	6.16
Special		February 14, 2007		N/A

== Episodes ==
=== Season 1 (2006–07) ===
No. overall	No. in season	Title	Directed by	Written by	Morse code	Original release date	U.S. viewers (millions)
1	1	"Pilot: The First Seventeen Hours"	Jon Turteltaub	Story by : Jonathan E. Steinberg, Josh Schaer & Stephen Chbosky; Teleplay by : Stephen Chbosky	JERICHO PILOT	September 20, 2006	11.66
Jake Green returns to his hometown of Jericho, Kansas after a five-year absence. He recounts to his family and friends varying stories on where he had been. Many residents of the town watch the President giving an address to Congress. Jake leaves after a disagreement with his father, but while he is driving along the highway, a nuclear bomb explodes just across the state border in Denver. In the aftermath, Jake encounters a crashed bus and its occupants; he saves the injured bus driver and a group of young children. A prison bus also crashes, allowing the convicts inside to escape and kill the sheriff of Jericho. The town's citizens grow more worried when they learn of a second nuclear explosion in Atlanta. The pilot episode was filmed on location in Fillmore, California, while the standing sets for the town of Jericho were built at Calvert Studios in Van Nuys, California. The CBS airing of the pilot received 11.66 million viewers, and was second place for its time spot on the networks. The episode received 25% more viewers in the 18–49 age group for its time on CBS than the previous year.
2	2	"Fallout"	Jon Turteltaub	Stephen Chbosky	JERICHO FALLOUT	September 27, 2006	11.47
Radioactive fallout threatens Jericho when a storm from the Denver-area approaches; Jake and his brother Eric attempt to move citizens to basements, public fallout shelters, and the local salt mine so that they will be protected. Emily Sullivan gets picked up by two escaped prisoners, disguised as deputy sheriffs; they attack her, but Jake arrives in time and kills them. Bonnie's brother Stanley arrives later and reveals that he saw tanks heading westward. Jake relays this information via radio to Johnston, who suspects it might be the Kansas National Guard. Robert Hawkins receives a disturbing Morse Code message, and adds several thumbtacks to a map of the United States, marking other nuclear explosions in cities such as San Diego and Philadelphia.
3	3	"Four Horsemen"	James Whitmore, Jr.	Dan O'Shannon & Dan Shotz	JERICHO THREE	October 4, 2006	10.83
Robert Hawkins, clad in a Hazmat suit, moves a large metal canister and other items from a small moving truck into a storage locker. The rest of the town hides from the radioactive rain and are unaware of his actions. After the storm, Jericho's citizens reemerge, but a man who had sought shelter in the salt mine dies of a heart attack. Jake devises a plan for a group of volunteers, "Four Horsemen", to search for news, but it is interrupted by a faint Chinese news report of similar attacks on other major cities. The town agrees to Jake's plan of searching for information; he then finds a plane that has carried out an emergency landing, and returns with its flight recorder.
4	4	"Walls of Jericho"	Martha Mitchell	Ellie Herman	HE KNOWS ROB	October 11, 2006	10.86
As gas begins to run low, the remaining supply is reapportioned for the local medical center. A man dying of radiation poisoning and burns is caught as he attempts to break into the pharmacy. Jake realizes that the man, Victor Miller, had reached the town in the car of one of the "Four Horsemen". Miller tells Jake and Hawkins that he had led a group of refugees from Denver. When Jake leaves, Miller tells Hawkins about an unidentified traitor in their organization before suddenly dying of a heart attack. The town searches for the refugees, and finds that they are all dead. Hawkins sends an email to an unidentified recipient, bearing news of the traitor and that the "rally point is no longer secure".
5	5	"Federal Response"	Duane Clark	Mike Ostrowski	THERE IS A FIRE	October 18, 2006	10.88
As Eric and Mary Bailey discuss their extramarital affair, electricity suddenly returns and telephones play a recorded message from the government that "help is on the way". A power spike starts fires in the town library and at the trailer park. Eric's wife, April, informs him that she no longer intends to file for divorce. Hawkins bypasses a government internet block and accesses Jake's passport history, which shows visits to South American and Middle Eastern countries. As the episode ends, intercontinental ballistic missiles (ICBMs) are seen passing overhead.
6	6	"9:02"	J. Miller Tobin	Nancy Won	THE EMP HITS	October 25, 2006	10.56
An ICBM launched in the previous episode detonates; its electromagnetic pulse renders most electronics in Jericho useless. The town's citizens slowly adapt to a life without electricity and outside goods. Jake's former friend, Mitchell Cafferty, steals food and horses from the town. He and other raiders take Jake hostage and it is revealed that Cafferty is the reason why Jake originally left Jericho. Cafferty is eventually captured and vows revenge on Jake. Stanley needs pesticides for his crops, and unwillingly surrenders part of his harvest to the town to receive them. Meanwhile, Robert Hawkins' daughter, Allison, discovers his map, and Robert tells her that he works as a spy for the United States government.
7	7	"Long Live the Mayor"	Sanford Bookstaver	Josh Schaer & Jonathan E. Steinberg	PRAY FOR NYC	November 1, 2006	9.87
Gray Anderson, another of the "Four Horsemen", returns to Jericho with information he learned from FEMA personnel in Topeka. He reveals that New York City was saved due to the NYPD intercepting the bombers, owing to their increased counterterrorism efforts after 9/11. Washington, D.C. however was destroyed, causing Mimi Clark, an IRS employee in Jericho, to suffer great distress. Anderson is suspicious of newcomers to Jericho after what he saw on his trip and wishes to interrogate them. Meanwhile, Emily Sullivan's estranged father, criminal Jonah Prowse, comes to bail out Mitchell Cafferty; he agrees to return the stolen supplies and to stay away from Jericho in return for Cafferty's release. Jake also has a history with Jonah's shady activities, which culminated in the unspecified death of Emily's brother Chris (for which she blames Jake and Jonah). However, Gray and Eric do not uphold the deal, and Jonah breaks Cafferty out. Mayor Green falls ill and though Emily gets medicine from Jonah, Green needs more specialized antibiotics to survive; Jake and Eric travel to a hospital in Rogue River to try to obtain some.
8	8	"Rogue River"	Guy Bee	Matthew Federman & Stephen Scaia	ROB NOT FBI	November 8, 2006	9.68
Jake and Eric travel to Rogue River to obtain medicine for their father, but on arriving, they see that the Federal Emergency Management Agency (FEMA) has evacuated the town. Dr. Kenchy Dhuwhalia tells the two that a private military company called Ravenwood was tasked with transporting the patients at the hospital, but instead killed them and looted the hospital. When the mercenaries return, Jake and Eric ambush them and return to Jericho with the doctor, but accidentally leave behind Eric's identification. Gray Anderson questions Robert Hawkins, who tells him that he is a Federal Bureau of Investigation (FBI) Special Agent; Gray agrees to keep this information confidential. April tells her in-laws that she is pregnant, while Eric decides to leave her for Mary Bailey.
9	9	"Crossroads"	Paul McCrane	Robert Levine	1ST SURPRISE	November 15, 2006	9.34
While Goetz, a Ravenwood unit leader, approaches Jericho, Gray, Jake, and Robert Hawkins create an armed checkpoint to block the bridge leading into town. The three plan to destroy the bridge to prevent Goetz from crossing the river. The Richmonds refuse to evacuate, and Eric reports this to his father, who gives orders against destroying the bridge. Jake defies his father and moves to the center of the bridge with a detonator in his hand. When a Ravenwood sniper trains his weapon on Jake, Hawkins shoots the sniper. Eric arrives with Jonah Prowse, and some of his men and Ravenwood retreat. Jonah attempts to drive a wedge between Jake and the townspeople before leaving. Mayor Green allows Jake to create a security force: the Rangers. Meanwhile, Emily Sullivan dreams of her planned wedding day with her fiancé Roger and thinks about her feelings for Jake. Eric tells his mother of his intent to leave April.
10	10	"Red Flag"	Martha Mitchell	Mike Ostrowski	IT BEGINS WITH	November 22, 2006	9.74
Airplanes drop supplies from China around Jericho. Although Mayor Green worries about contamination, Gray undercuts him by eating some of the food. As retaliation for Green's efforts to break a deal between Gracie Leigh and Jonah, Jonah attacks Stanley and steals a generator. Mayor Green, Jake, and Hawkins organize a raid, but Emily breaks into Jonah's compound and steals it from a shocked Jonah. Stanley and Mimi Clark begin a relationship, and Eric finally learns of April's pregnancy. With the recovered generator, Hawkins reinstalls lights along Main Street for the Thanksgiving Day celebrations, during which Gracie is stabbed to death.
11	11	"Vox Populi"	James Whitmore, Jr.	Carol Barbee	6 AND ENDS WITH	November 29, 2006	10.25
A lynch mob, headed by Gray Anderson, moves against Jonah Prowse, who they believe killed Gracie. Jonah arrives at his daughter Emily Sullivan's house and claims that Mitchell Cafferty killed Gracie. After his wounds are bandaged, Jonah flees but is quickly recaptured by Gray, who is subsequently elected mayor. Gray forms an ad hoc tribunal which convicts Jonah of murder. Johnston Green's disapproval forces Gray to exile Jonah instead of executing him. Dale Turner inherits Gracie's store; Mitchell Cafferty demands a share of the profits and threatens to kill him when he refuses. Later, Dale shoots and kills Mitchell. At the end of the episode, a group of refugees led by Emily's fiancé, Roger Hammond, arrives in Jericho; at the same time, Hawkins tells his contacts that he is compromised, and they are to proceed without him, but they produce a satellite image of him with his family and say they will see him soon.
12	12	"The Day Before"	Matt Earl Beesley	Mike Kelley	BLOODSHED	February 21, 2007	8.30
This flashback episode starts at 36 hours before the attacks and focuses on Jake and the Hawkins family. Robert Hawkins is given a truck, a nuclear bomb, and his target – Columbus, Ohio. Instead of traveling there and detonating his bomb, he kidnaps his estranged wife and children and moves them to Jericho, subduing two police officers in the process. His wife points a gun at him, but before anything more can happen, the Denver bomb explodes. While living in San Diego, Jake's friend tries to co-opt him for an illegal cargo run operation in the Middle East. Jake refuses, having been informed that he is under government surveillance for his past ties to Ravenwood. When Ravenwood murders Jake's friend, Jake rescues his friend's girlfriend and decides to travel back to Jericho. Emily's fiancé Roger tries to convince her to move to Chicago with him, but decides to fly home, after Emily states that she will not move away from Jericho. Roger's plane makes an emergency landing after a bomb explodes. The episode moves to the present day after that and focuses on a group of refugees, led by Roger and including Robert's contact Sarah Mason, as they arrive in Jericho.
13	13	"Black Jack"	Helen Shaver	Jonathan E. Steinberg & Dan Stolz	BLEEDING KS	February 28, 2007	8.31
To procure supplies and fuels, Heather, Jake, Johnston Green, and Dale travel to Black Jack Fairground, a trading post. At the trading post, the group learns more about the outside world and finds a seller for their windmill parts, but decides not to buy parts for their generator after discovering bloody shackles in the supplier's storeroom. Dale tries to steal a governor but is caught and about to be executed when a group from Jericho's neighboring town, New Bern, saves him. The Jericho and Bern groups make a deal – Heather will go to New Bern and build windmills for both towns, while Jericho gives New Bern salt from their mine. Meanwhile, Gail confronts Mary about Mary's affair with Eric, and Roger tells Emily what happened to him on his way back to Jericho. Sarah Mason and Robert Hawkins decide to kill "the old man" (the leader of their conspiracy), though it seems that Sarah has already betrayed Hawkins.
14	14	"Heart of Winter"	Steve Gomer	Nancy Won	4 DOWN 4 TO GO	March 7, 2007	8.10
Jake, Stanley, and Mimi go hunting but are attacked by bandits who steal their supplies and winter clothing. Jake and Stanley are incapacitated. While running back to town to seek assistance, Mimi meets Johnston and Gail Green, who bring more help. Jake, delirious, admits to killing a young girl while in Iraq. Hawkins and Sarah go to visit the "old man"'s house, and Sarah convinces Hawkins to move his "package" (the nuclear bomb) before the "old man" can attack them. Hawkins tells his wife Darcy that the family must move again soon; she agrees but warns him not to trust Sarah. Sarah meets with the "old man" who had been watching them and kills him, when he asks why she is taking so long to assassinate Hawkins. Emily notices Roger is spending a lot of time with the refugees whom he arrived with.
15	15	"Semper Fidelis"	James Whitmore, Jr.	Matthew Federman & Stephen Scaia	THEY WILL NEED IT	March 14, 2007	7.76
The town continues to face a growing food and fuel shortage. A platoon of supposed Marines arrives with a tank and promises to help with reconstruction. However, they are suddenly ordered back to Dodge City before they can render assistance. Mayor Anderson, anxious to receive supplies quickly, throws a farewell dinner and fireworks display, and the town donates half their food supplies to the soldiers. Jake and his father independently deduce that the "Marines" are impostors and confront them. They are revealed to be refugees that stole military equipment after a riot at a FEMA camp. The Greens then take the tank and cast the imposters out of town. Meanwhile, Sarah holds Hawkins and his family at gunpoint to force Robert to give her the nuclear bomb. During a confrontation, Allison shoots and kills Sarah, and Darcy leaves with her children. Hawkins pretends to be Sarah and arranges a meeting with her contact.
16	16	"Winter's End"	Kevin Dowling	Frank Military	A COSTLY DEAL	March 28, 2007	8.52
April goes into premature labor, and her child dies during exploratory surgery to assess the problem. New Bern arrives with one wind turbine. Johnston Green asks for several more, but New Bern demands a heavy payment of salt and crops, in addition to ten men to help build the turbines. Eric and Stanley are among the ten men. Jake warns Russell, Heather's friend from New Bern, to keep the men safe. Russell mentions that Heather knew of the turbine's delivery but did not want to come. Darcy moves in with Deputy Sheriff Jimmy Taylor's family temporarily, and backs up Robert when he claims that Sarah decided to travel south on her own. Meanwhile, Dale threatens a farmer at gunpoint when the farmer refuses to pay his side of a deal. April dies from complications associated with her pregnancy.
17	17	"One Man's Terrorist"	Christine Moore	Stephen Chbosky & Mike Ostrowski	ROB EXPOSED	April 4, 2007	8.00
After Gray is forced to admit that no relief is coming, he announces that the refugees must leave. While he and Roger argue, the refugees attack the police and barricade themselves in the church. Gray tries to force them out with tear gas but accidentally kills one of them. Roger captures Gray and holds him at gunpoint; during a struggle, Gray is shot in the stomach. Gail Green devises a compromise: the refugees are allowed to stay with the residents of Jericho, but Roger is to be exiled, a decision he does not protest. Hawkins travels to Nebraska, to meet people who think they are meeting Sarah and the nuclear bomb, and places a tracking device on their vehicle. Dale and Skylar continue to use strong-arm tactics to enforce deals made with the people for supplies. A radio broadcast announces that the terrorists in New York were found carrying fake FBI badges. Jake then remembers seeing a similar badge with Hawkins.
18	18	"A.K.A."	Sanford Bookstaver	Robbie Thompson	WHO RAN RED BELL	April 11, 2007	8.19
Jake and Jimmy break into Robert Hawkins' house and discover many fake IDs. Jake demands that Hawkins tell him the truth, and Hawkins agrees, but he warns Jake that he will regret it. Hawkins had been part of Project Red Bell, a Central Intelligence Agency (CIA) team organized to recover 25 stolen Russian nuclear bombs from domestic terrorist groups, who received them from an unknown source. After reluctantly killing an FBI informant, Hawkins had infiltrated his assigned terrorist group sufficiently to obtain several of the bombs, but his handler, Sarah Mason, insisted on getting all of them. When the terrorists were tipped off about Project Red Bell, they moved up the date of their attack. Robert took his bomb (destined for Columbus, Ohio), alerted New York police about their bomb threat, and moved with his family to Jericho, as it was the designated "safe" fallback town. Jake tells Jimmy that Hawkins is an FBI agent and is to be trusted. Hawkins realizes that the government supervisor of Project Red Bell, Thomas Valente, was the same man who he saw in the previous episode.
19	19	"Casus Belli"	Steven DePaul	Karen Hall	ONE GOT AWAY	April 18, 2007	7.66
The men who had gone to New Bern return with the windmills but without Eric and Heather. When Jake and Hawkins go to New Bern to find Eric, they discover that Mayor Constantino, covetous of Jericho's food and salt, is arming New Bern to go to war. Jake and Hawkins try to check the military offensive, but Jake is caught. Constantino riles up the town by making townspeople believe that Jericho intends to attack it, and he points to Jake and Eric as "proof". Eric tells Jake that Heather is dead.
20	20	"One If By Land"	Seith Mann	Joy Gregory	WE PLEDGE	April 25, 2007	7.56
Several New Bern residents arrive in Jericho to complete a secret salt trade with Dale and Skylar. Gray stops the trade, but someone fires a gun, and in the ensuing firefight several people are wounded. New Bern police torture Jake and Eric for information about Jericho's defenses. Jake tells Maggie Mullen, a fake Marine from "Semper Fidelis", to give up Hawkins' location at Heather's friend Ted's cabin. Hawkins kills the police officers sent after him, steals truck full of mortar bombs, and detonates it in the middle of New Bern. Johnston Green, who had gone to New Bern to look for his sons, commandeers a truck and escapes along with Jake, Eric, Maggie, and Hawkins. Meanwhile in Jericho, Gail and Mary reconcile, and Dale seizes more power after arbitrarily raising prices and refusing to accept currency.
21	21	"Coalition of the Willing"	Guy Bee	Frank Military & Josh Schaer	ALLEGIANCE	May 2, 2007	8.03
Constantino demands that Jericho surrender several farms and a large portion of the salt mine or face an invasion. When Gray Anderson refuses, New Bern begins shelling Jericho. Gray sends a small force to attack the artillery squad; only four of them return. Gray seems willing to surrender, but Johnston Green does not allow this. Emily meets her father, Jonah Prowse, and convinces him to help Jericho. Dale raises a militia, and although he wishes to use it for his own financial gain, he agrees to help the town. The two groups join with the main Jericho force and kill the entire New Bern artillery squad. Jonah, who had originally agreed to help in exchange for half the resources gained, instead executes the wounded New Bern soldiers, takes all of their resources, and leaves. Constantino says he will be coming with a much larger force. Hawkins reveals a secret arsenal of weapons and arms every able-bodied person. Johnston takes military command, and they prepare to face the invading force.
22	22	"Why We Fight"	Sanford Bookstaver	Carol Barbee & Jonathan E. Steinberg	TO THE FLAG	May 9, 2007	7.72
This episode is interspersed with flashbacks to Eric and April's wedding day, when Jake was inebriated. People expected Jake, who was best man, to be unprepared to deliver his wedding toast, but he was not. New Bern begins its attack on Jericho. Initially outgunned, Jericho manages to drive them away, with the aid of Hawkins' satellite access and the tank. Johnston Green is mortally wounded and dies soon afterward. While Hawkins tracks New Bern reinforcements, Thomas Valente, now a member of the new federal government, locates Hawkins. Darcy Hawkins, now reunited with her husband, speculates that Valente wants to destroy the bomb before it can be used as evidence against him. Heather Lisinski, who is being treated at a military base, urges Colonel Hoffman to intervene in the Jericho–New Bern battle. Although Hoffman claims he cannot, Thomas Valente tells him to stop the battle and search for a nearby "terrorist". The episode ends on a cliffhanger; Jake replies to Constantino's call to surrender with, "Nuts!" The battle begins as Hawkins spots an incoming squadron of military helicopters.

=== Season 2 (2008) ===
No. overall	No. in season	Title	Directed by	Written by	Morse code	Original release date	U.S. viewers (millions)
23	1	"Reconstruction"	Steve Boyum	Carol Barbee & Jonathan E. Steinberg	WE'RE BAAACK	February 12, 2008	7.09
A new government based in Cheyenne, Wyoming—the "Allied States of America" (ASA)—begins rebuilding the area. Major Beck, the military commander of the region, declares that the Jericho-New Bern feud is over and offers general amnesty to all, believing that penalties would only strengthen the feud. He also appoints Heather Lisinski to be an ambassador between the two towns. Angered by Beck's declaration, Jake, Eric, and several of the Rangers plot to kill Constantino. However, Hawkins abandons the plan, and Beck warns Jake not to try anything. When Eric decides to go ahead anyway, Jake tries to stop him, offering a credible story to Beck to save his brother's life. Jake then accepts an offer from Beck to become Sheriff of Jericho. Meanwhile, Robert and Darcy Hawkins meet with a newly arrived member of Robert's team, Chavez, who informs them that the former United States of America has been split into three parts: the ASA, composed of the former western states, and the United States of America, reformed with the eastern states and based in Columbus; the border between these is the Mississippi River. In addition, Texas is now independent once again. Stanley and Mimi get engaged.
24	2	"Condor"	Christopher Leitch	Matthew Federman & Stephen Scaia	J&R RAN BOXCAR	February 19, 2008	5.86
Jericho prepares for a visit from the ASA's President, John Tomarchio, but citizens are uneasy after Jericho is given revisionist history textbooks and Gray Anderson is asked to represent the region at an unelected Constitutional Convention. Gray agrees to go to the Convention, but promises he will ask tough questions there. He also installs Eric as Acting Mayor. A California reporter arrives and explains to Jake that the ASA tells newspapers what to publish and often covers up bad news. Jake tells the reporter that he has news of the attacks, but the reporter turns up dead shortly thereafter. Chavez, Robert, and Darcy covertly download several Presidential files, which reveal that the ASA doctored the results of a test for the fission origins of the bombs, but Chavez is exposed and captured during the attempt. Jake slips Chavez a key, and he escapes from military custody. Hawkins' universal password can open all of the files except a folder named Project Boxcar; neither he nor Chavez had ever heard of it. Chavez leaves for Texas to see if he can get the Texas government to listen to Hawkins. Valente informs Beck that Ravenwood will be coming to oversee the day-to-day administration of Jericho.
25	3	"Jennings & Rall"	John Peters	Joy Gregory	CALLER KNOWS ALL	February 26, 2008	6.90
Dale returns from a trading expedition with information that a dangerous disease known as the "Hudson River virus" has "jumped" the Mississippi River. Goetz of Ravenwood captures vaccines for the Hudson River virus and orders their destruction; agents in Jennings & Rall (J&R), the civilian company working with the government and owner of Ravenwood, are powerless to stop him. After Heather talks with another town plagued by the virus, Jake tells Dale how to hijack a J&R transport truck. Though Goetz is suspicious and tortures Dr. Kenchy to try to obtain information, a friendly J&R employee falsely informs him that the vaccines were destroyed, allowing the town to be secretly inoculated. Meanwhile, to protect his identity, Hawkins tells Beck that he is an FBI agent loyal to the United States of America who is also looking for Sarah. He tells Beck some truths about Sarah; after Valente flatly denies them, Beck agrees to leave Hawkins to his investigation. Hawkins decodes a phone number and after talking to another member of his team he is called on the secure phone by an unknown person who claims he wants to help him.
26	4	"Oversight"	Steve Gomer	Robert Levine	A COSTLY DEATH	March 4, 2008	5.67
Dale is smuggling to continue importing goods under J&R's tight regulations. Goetz temporarily shuts down Dale's store after an informant tells him that Dale is the primary smuggler and arrests him. However Jake gets Beck to declare that Dale is a terror informant and Beck frees him. Mimi finds that some money may have been embezzled from J&R's stash and reports it to her supervisor who tells Goetz. Goetz demands that Mimi bring in her private ledger which Mimi agrees to do but he arrives at her house with an armed force later that day anyway. When Ravenwood demands to search the house Bonnie tries to cover for Mimi and shoots several Ravenwood employees before being killed herself. Meanwhile "John Smith" tells Hawkins that Beck has a radiological scan of the area and he needs to steal it. He and Jake are forced to ask Heather to steal it from his office which she reluctantly does. Beck becomes disturbed when he recognizes Valente from the video of the meet for the package exchange.
27	5	"Termination for Cause"	Guy Bee	Rob Fresco	THO IT IS DARK	March 11, 2008	5.84
Goetz and his team learn that Mimi Clark is still alive and surround the medical center while Beck deals with an uprising in New Bern. Goetz starts taking hostages to force the Rangers to leave, but this only alerts Hawkins to the situation. Mimi awakens and Hawkins has "John Smith" give him the email address of one of Goetz's bosses. Jake identifies Goetz's informant and has him and a captured Ravenwood agent reroute Goetz to a crossroads near Stanley's farm. There Goetz's boss arrives and fires him. After he leaves the Rangers, as well as several people from New Bern who had been tracking Goetz, arrive and kill all the Ravenwood employees except for Goetz in a battle as Beck had argued that nothing happen to him in retribution. Jake wants to turn Goetz over to Beck but Constantino had ordered that Goetz be killed. While Jake and Russell argue, Stanley shoots Goetz and Beck finds Goetz's body hanging outside an entrance to New Bern.
28	6	"Sedition"	Scott Peters	Carol Barbee, Matthew Federman & Stephen Scaia	KNOW OUR FLAG	March 18, 2008	5.73
Major Beck arrests Jake and puts him in solitary confinement, hoping that he will give up the Rangers' and especially Stanley's location. The Rangers ambush a military convoy in retaliation and demand Jake's immediate release; Beck declares the Rangers to be in open insurrection. Normal citizens of Jericho then begin guerrilla warfare against the military. Jake's mother is given permission to visit Jake; after the visit, she gives the Rangers enough information for them to find and free Jake. Meanwhile Chavez tells Hawkins to deliver the bomb to Texas; John Smith asks him to wait a few days. Hawkins agrees to Smith's plan but starts for Texas immediately causing Smith to betray Hawkins to Beck. Hawkins escapes Beck's attempt at capture but is forced to abandon his laptop and the bomb. John Smith, who is revealed to be the mastermind behind the nuclear attacks, says that he plans on using Hawkins' bomb to destroy Cheyenne and Jennings & Rall.
29	7	"Patriots and Tyrants"	Seith Mann	Jonathan E. Steinberg & Dan Stolz	IS STILL THERE	March 25, 2008	6.02
Jake and Hawkins meet with one of Hawkins' teammates, Cheung, in Cheyenne. They plan to seize the bomb, which is being covertly transported in an ambulance by the ASA government. However, John Smith is present at the scene; he kills Cheung and wounds Hawkins before escaping. Hawkins has Jake drive the truck to the Texan embassy, where they receive political asylum. Meanwhile, Beck receives orders to move ahead with his crackdown. Heather berates Beck for this and he arrests her. Eric agrees to meet with Constantino for his resistance movement, but later finds Constantino's tactics repugnant and repudiates him. After looking through the evidence on Hawkins' laptop, Beck refuses to take orders from the ASA leadership and travels to the Richmond farm where Bonnie is being buried and grants amnesty to Jericho. The Texan ambassador helps Hawkins and Jake to escape and provides them with a plane which carries the bomb. During the flight they are harried by F-15 Eagles from the ASA but two Texan F-16 Fighting Falcons shoot them down. They land in Texas where the bomb is tested. Gray Anderson, who had returned at Jake and Hawkins' behest, raises Johnston Green's "Don't Tread on Me" Gadsden flag.

=== Special (2007) ===
Title	Directed by	Morse code	Original release date
"Return to Jericho"	Rob Klug	BACK NEXT WEEK. 36 HOURS BEFORE BOMBS	February 14, 2007
A recap episode detailing the events of the first eleven episodes.

== Comic series continuations ==
=== Season 4 (comics) ===
A fourth season was also released in comic book format.

== Ratings ==
Jericho : U.S. viewers per episode (millions)

Season	Episode number																					
Season	1	2	3	4	5	6	7	8	9	10	11	12	13	14	15	16	17	18	19	20	21	22
1	11.66	11.47	10.83	10.86	10.88	10.56	9.87	9.68	9.34	9.74	10.25	8.30	8.31	8.10	7.76	8.52	8.00	8.19	7.66	7.56	8.03	7.72
2	7.09	5.86	6.90	5.67	5.84	5.73	6.02	–														

Audience measurement performed by Nielsen Media Research

== Notes ==
1, 2. The sounds heard as the intertitle is shown are International Morse Code episode-specific messages.
3. In the original ending, Hawkins acts as a diversion at the airport to buy Jake more time. A third season would have focused on rescuing Hawkins and on "John Smith".
4. After the episode ends, a war begins.
