= Pilot (Jericho) =

- Jericho episode
- A mushroom cloud on Jericho's horizon resulting from a nuclear explosion in Denver, Colorado
- Episode no.: Season 1 Episode 1
- Directed by: Jon Turteltaub
- Written by: Stephen Chbosky
- Original air date: September 20, 2006

Guest appearances
- Alicia Coppola as Mimi Clark; Germaine De Leon as Alvie Clemons

Episode chronology
← Previous —	Next → "Fallout"

"Pilot" (titled some places as "Pilot: The First Seventeen Hours") is the first episode of the first season and the pilot for the apocalyptic drama television series Jericho. The episode was broadcast by CBS on September 20, 2006 to approximately 11.66 million viewers.

The pilot episode was filmed on location in Fillmore, California, while the standing sets for the town of Jericho were built at Calvert Studios in Van Nuys, California.

== Plot ==
- Morse code: ·--- · ·-· ·· -·-· ···· --- ·--· ·· ·-·· --- –
- Translation: JERICHO PILOT

Thirty-two-year-old Jake Green returns for a short visit to his small hometown of Jericho in northern Kansas following a mysterious five-year absence. While he was away, Jake had no contact with any of his family or friends, except possibly his mother Gail. Jake is evasive about his absence; he is asked where he has been by various Jericho residents and he gives different answers – including claims to have been playing minor league baseball and serving in both the Army and Navy.

Jake's mother, Gail, who apparently knows where Jake has been, is very happy and relieved to see him. Jake discusses with his father, Mayor Johnston Green, the inheritance Jake's grandfather left him. Johnston refuses to release the money to Jake until Jake leads what Johnston calls "a more productive life". Afterwards, Jake goes to visit his grandfather's grave. Despite his mother's objections. Jake leaves Jericho that same day, telling his mother that he must return to San Diego.

As Jake leaves town, the President addresses a joint session of the United States Congress about a rise in global violence. Simultaneously, all the television and radio stations and telephone communication go dead. At the same time, some residents of the town see a mushroom cloud on the horizon, in the direction of Denver, Colorado over a mountain range. On the highway, another driver, distracted by the cloud, drifts into the opposing lane, where Jake is driving, also distracted. The cars collide, killing the occupants of the other car and knocking Jake unconscious.

Meanwhile, a school bus is returning from a field trip, late because it had to stop for repairs, with the elementary-school-aged children of Jericho. Heather Lisinski, the teacher accompanying them, notices the mushroom cloud. The children are watching a deer running next to the bus for a few seconds; it then crosses in front of the bus and is hit, causing the bus to swerve off the road.

On the highway, Jake regains consciousness and finds that he has a leg injury. He finds the passengers in the other vehicle dead. He begins walking back toward town, and shortly afterwards encounters two children who have ventured from the bus in search of help. Jake makes it to the bus, where he finds the driver dead and Heather with a broken leg. Only one of the children is injured, but she is having significant difficulty breathing and is in mortal danger. Jake performs an emergency tracheotomy using straws from the children's juice boxes and band-aids to create a temporary airway. He then drives the bus back to town.

While searching for the children, Sheriff Dawes and Deputy Riley find a Leavenworth prison bus that has crashed. They mistake it for the school bus and are both shot while investigating.

In town, Dale Turner discovers a message from his mother on his answering machine. The end of the message is interrupted by a large explosion heard in the background. Dale later plays the message for a group of adults at the Greens' house. Gail offers condolences to Dale, saying that she hadn't known Dale's mother was visiting Denver. Dale tells the group that his mother wasn't visiting Denver but rather was in Atlanta, Georgia. Earlier, Mayor Green had tried to calm citizens by speculating that the Denver incident was isolated and possibly a military accident instead of a widespread enemy attack. Shortly after, Gail informs the mayor about the second explosion in Atlanta.

Residents swarm the gas station to fill up their cars and trucks. Electrical power fails. The situation comes close to a riot before Mayor Green arrives and calms the crowd, temporarily. The townspeople press the mayor for answers, and at one point he reveals that there was another explosion in Atlanta. The situation almost escalates again, but calms down when the school bus arrives with the children. Jake tells the crowd to help the children, and informs his brother that he drove past a prison bus that had crashed. With no means of communication and no power, Jerichoans are isolated from the outside world, not knowing what is left of that world, or how many others are still alive and must find means of survival in the midst of panic and chaos.

The episode ends with Emily Sullivan, an old friend of Jake who is seemingly unaware of the day's events, driving on an isolated rural road. She is on her way to the airport to meet with her fiancé, who is returning from a trip. Feeling bumps in the road, she stops the car and gets out to see what the problem is. The road is covered with dead birds that seemingly just dropped from the sky.

== Reception ==
The CBS airing of the pilot received 11.66 million viewers, and was second place for its time spot on the networks. The episode received 25% more viewers in the 18–49 age group for its time on CBS than the previous year.

== Music ==
- The Killers – "All These Things That I've Done"
- Rascal Flatts – "Pieces"
- Bon Jovi – "Who Says You Can't Go Home"
- Goo Goo Dolls – "Better Days"
- Snow Patrol – "Run"
- John Powell – "Nach Deutschland"
