= Stephen Scaia =

American writer, TV producer

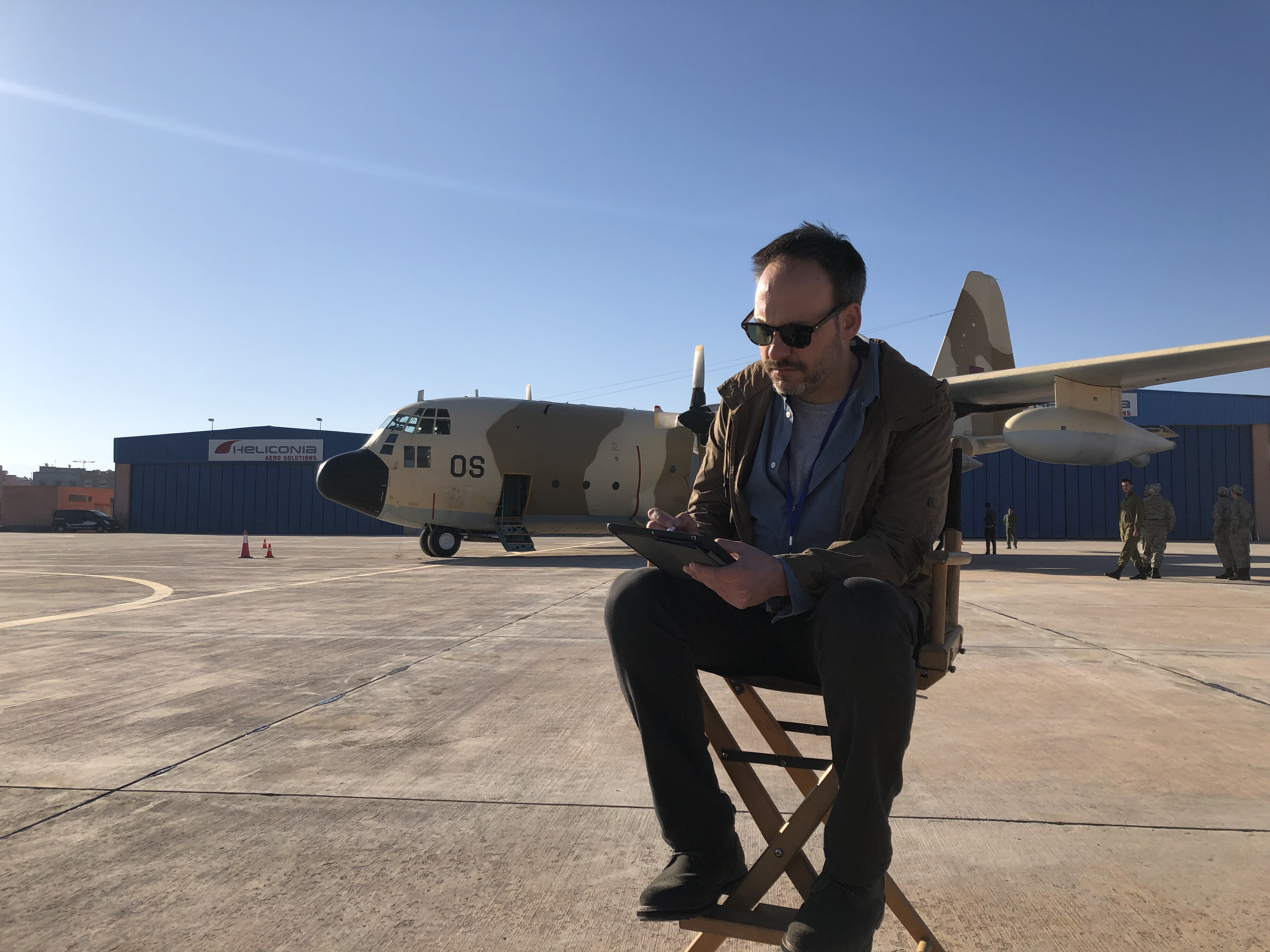
- Scaia on the set of Blood & Treasure in Morocco, November 2018
- Born: Stephen Scaia; May 11, 1976 (age 50); Indianapolis, Indiana, U.S.
- Education: Emerson College
- Occupations: Writer; producer; director
- Spouse: Simone Bailly (m. 2011; div. 2019)

Stephen Scaia is an American writer, director, and producer known for Blood & Treasure (2019–2023), Tulsa King (2023-2024) Jericho (2006) and Limitless (2015). He is a graduate of Emerson College in Boston.

== Background ==
Scaia was born in Indianapolis, Indiana and grew up in Dayton, Ohio. He attended Emerson College, studying film and television. After graduating in 1998 he moved to Los Angeles.

He began his career as a production assistant eventually becoming a writer's assistant on The West Wing. His writing caught the eye of one of the producers, which landed him his first staff-writing job on Judging Amy (2004). Since then, Scaia has written and produced for multiple television series, most notably co-creating Blood & Treasure (2019–present). with his former collaborator Matthew Federman. The pair stopped co-writing together in early 2020.

=== Writing ===
Scaia began his writing career on Judging Amy (2004). He has received writing credits on E-Ring (2005), Jericho (2006), Warehouse 13 (2009), Human Target (2009), Limitless (2015), and Blood & Treasure (2019-2023) and Tulsa King (2023-2024).

=== Producing ===
Scaia received his first producer credit on Jericho (2008). In 2009–2010, he served as a co-producer on Warehouse 13 and Human Target. In subsequent years, he worked on Charlie's Angels (2011), and was a co-executive producer on Limitless (2016). In 2019, he co-created the action-adventure series Blood & Treasure, serving as executive producer, as well as showrunner and the director of multiple episodes.

=== Acting ===
In 2004, Scaia appeared as a guest star in season 6, episode 7 of Judging Amy, playing the role of Dr. Rinier.

=== Other projects ===
In 2005, Star Wars: Underworld, a live-action TV series by George Lucas, was put into development with Scaia attached as one of the writers. However, the series fell apart due to a lack of funding. In 2011, Scaia and Federman were hired by New Line Cinema to adapt Y: The Last Man into a feature-film, and after submitting a draft, it was reported that the studio was "pleased enough to move the project up their priority list". However, the project stalled during the development stage, and in 2014, it was announced that New Line Cinema would be reverting the rights back to the co-creators of the property, Brian K. Vaughan and Pia Guerra.

In 2012, Scaia was also hired to pen the script for a Zorro reboot based on the 2005 novel by Isabel Allende. The adaptation was to have taken place prior to his origins in Johnston McCulley's "The Curse of Capistrano" in 1919. In 2013, Scaia and Federman were hired to write the Ghost Recon movie for Ubisoft with Michael Bay at the helm.

In 2014, it was announced that Scaia and Federman would be adapting Pax Romana, a miniseries based on the graphic novel by Jonathan Hickman. Also in 2014, Scaia was hired to adapt Garrett Graff's nonfiction book Raven Rock, which explores the history of the U.S. government's secret plan to "save itself" in the event that most of America or its leaders are killed in a nuclear attack on the U.S." The series was acquired by NBC in a "script deal with significant penalty".

== Credits ==
Television
Year	Production	Role
2023–2024	Tulsa King	Co-Executive Producer / Writer
2019–2022	Blood & Treasure	Creator / Executive Producer / Director / Writer
2015–2016	Limitless	Co-Executive Producer / Writer
2011	Charlie's Angels	Supervising Producer
2010	Human Target	Producer / Writer
2009	Warehouse 13	Co-Producer / Writer
2006–2008	Jericho	Co-Producer / Writer
2006	E-Ring	Writer
2004–2005	Judging Amy	Writer
