= Blood & Treasure =

2019 American action–adventure drama television series

- Genre: Action; Adventure; Drama
- Created by: Matthew Federman; Stephen Scaia
- Starring: Matt Barr; Sofia Pernas; James Callis; Katia Winter; Michael James Shaw; Oded Fehr; Alicia Coppola; Mark Gagliardi; Michelle Lee
- Composer: Kyle Newmaster
- Country of origin: United States
- Original language: English
- No. of seasons: 2
- No. of episodes: 25

Production
- Executive producers: Michael Dinner (pilot only); Mark Vlasic; Marc Webb; Howard T. Owens; Ben Silverman; Taylor Elmore; Matthew Federman; Stephen Scaia; Irene Litinsky; Joel Rice
- Production locations: Rome, Turin, Venice, Italy & Gressoney-Saint-Jean; Marrakesh & Tangier, Morocco
- Cinematography: Anthony Wolberg; Ronald Plante; Michel St-Martin
- Editors: Annie Ilkow; D. Gillian Truster; Simon Webb; Benjamin Duffield
- Running time: 38–83 minutes
- Production companies: Propagate; Lake June Productions; CBS Studios

Original release
- Network: CBS
- Release: May 21 – August 6, 2019
- Network: Paramount+
- Release: July 17 – October 2, 2022

Blood & Treasure is an American action adventure television series created by Matthew Federman and Stephen Scaia that premiered on May 21, 2019, on CBS. Federman and Scaia also serve as writers and executive producers alongside Taylor Elmore, Ben Silverman, Marc Webb, and Mark Vlasic. In June 2019, CBS renewed the series for a second season. In May 2022, it was announced that the series moved from CBS to Paramount+. The second season premiered on Paramount+ on July 17, 2022. In February 2023, the series was canceled after two seasons.

== Premise ==
Blood & Treasure centers on "a brilliant antiquities expert and a cunning art thief who team up to catch a ruthless terrorist who funds his attacks through stolen treasure. As they crisscross the globe hunting their target, they unexpectedly find themselves in the center of a 2,000-year-old battle for the cradle of civilization."

== Cast and characters ==
=== Main ===
- Matt Barr as Danny McNamara, a former FBI agent who now works as a lawyer specializing in repatriating stolen art
- Sofia Pernas as Lexi Vaziri, a master thief and con woman partnered with Danny despite their tortured past. Her mother was secretly a member of the Brotherhood of Serapis and a descendant of Cleopatra.
- James Callis as Simon Hardwick (né Karim Farouk), an international smuggler who was rescued by Danny after being kidnapped by Farouk and now seeks to uncover the secrets behind the Brotherhood. He later kills Hegazi, allegedly as revenge for the torture he suffered at his hands, but really to keep Hegazi from revealing that he wasn't really Farouk. In the season 1 finale, it is revealed that he was the real Karim Farouk all along, as well as Reece's illegitimate son.
- Michael James Shaw as Aiden Shaw (né Dwayne Coleman), an arms dealer with ties to Farouk. He reluctantly assists Danny and Lexi at first, but eventually develops an acceptable working relationship with them.
- Mark Gagliardi as Father Chuck Donnelly, a childhood friend of Danny's who works as a priest in the Vatican foreign ministry
- Katia Winter as Gwen Karlsson (season 1), an Interpol agent assigned to the Farouk case
- Oded Fehr as Karim Farouk (né Rasheed Hegazi) (season 1), an Egyptian terrorist leader who was seemingly killed in a drone attack, but somehow survived and now seeks to steal ancient artifacts so he can weaponize them. He is shot and killed by Hardwick, who is revealed to be the real Farouk.
- Michelle Lee as Violet (season 2), Lexi's former partner in crime and friend, whom she left behind after a heist gone wrong. She is eventually revealed to be the Great Khan, the leader of a shady organization looking to take over the world using an ancient artifact known as the "Spirit Banner".

=== Recurring ===
- John Larroquette as Jacob "Jay" Reece III (season 1), a billionaire and father figure to Danny who oversees his effort to find Castillo and stop Farouk's plan. It is later revealed that, not only was he responsible for framing Danny's father for art theft, but Farouk is Reece's son, having been abandoned after Reece had a fling with a woman named Zara Farouk. He also murdered Dr. Castillo after she discovered the link between him and Farouk.
- Alicia Coppola as Dr. Anna Castillo (season 1), Danny's mentor who is regarded as the world's foremost expert on Cleopatra. She is murdered near the end of the first season by Jay Reece after uncovering the connection between him and Karim Farouk.
- Antonio Cupo as Captain Bruno Fabi (season 1), an officer in the Carabinieri TPC, and secretly a member of the Brotherhood of Serapis. He dies after being shot while helping Danny and Lexi.
- Mark Valley as Patrick McNamara, Danny's father who has been in prison for art theft for the past 20 years and has been estranged from his son. He is dying from an aggressive cancer and agrees to provide information relevant to the Farouk case in exchange for admission to an experimental drug trial and the chance to reconcile with Danny.
- Tony Nash as Omar (season 1), Farouk's second-in-command until he is killed after surrendering to the police
- Ali Hassan as Taj bin Yusef (season 1), a member of Farouk's organization who takes over after he is killed
- Anna Silk as Roarke (season 1), an ex-black ops agent, secretly hired by Reece, who goes after Danny and Lexi
- Victoria Diamond as Kate Reece (season 2), Jay Reece's daughter and Danny's former fiancée
- Ron Yuan as Batu/The Great Khan (season 2), a terrorist leader searching for the spirit banner of Genghis Khan. He is later revealed to be a decoy for the real Great Khan, Violet.
- Byron Mann as Vince Tran (season 2), a Vietnamese former cop turned private investigator who frequents Shaw's bar in Hanoi

== Episodes ==
=== Series overview ===
Season	Episodes	Originally released		
Season	Episodes	First released	Last released	Network
1	12	May 21, 2019	August 6, 2019	CBS
2	13	July 17, 2022	October 2, 2022	Paramount+

=== Season 1 (2019) ===
No. overall	No. in season	Title	Directed by	Written by	Original release date	Prod. code	U.S. viewers (millions)
1	1	"The Curse of Cleopatra: Parts I & II"	Part I: Michael Dinner; Part II: Alrick Riley	Matthew Federman & Stephen Scaia	May 21, 2019	101–102	5.62
Part I: When his mentor, Dr. Anna Castillo, is abducted by terrorists after discovering the tomb of Mark Antony and Cleopatra, art expert Danny McNamara recruits an old flame, professional thief Lexi Vaziri, to rescue her, despite Lexi blaming him for her father Reza's death two years prior at the hands of the same terrorists. With assistance provided by Danny's billionaire contact, Jay Reece, they track the stolen antiques to a Mafia auction in Rome, unaware that the Carabinieri are planning a raid. At the auction, Danny uses the resulting chaos as an opportunity to kidnap the terrorists' middleman, Aiden Shaw, who turns out to be an American named Dwayne Coleman. Shaw demands $2 million to contact his employers, but when Danny steps away to make a call, Lexi lets him escape so the pair can discreetly follow him. Danny admits that what happened to Reza still haunts him, and has carried his prayer beads with him every day since he died, giving Lexi some closure. She forgives him, and they prepare to pursue Shaw across the border. Part II: In 1942, a unit of German soldiers enter the tomb of Cleopatra and steal her sarcophagus; a handful of men escape while the others are sealed within the tomb by a mysterious cult. In the present day, Shaw tries to sell back his remaining antiques to Karim Farouk, a terrorist who was supposedly killed two years earlier, but when Danny and Lexi show up, Farouk shoots him and escapes despite Lexi's attempts to pursue him while Danny rescues Castillo and the still-alive Shaw. Danny and Lexi are arrested by Interpol agent Gwen Karlsson, but manage to parachute off the transport plane into the Vatican, where Danny's friend Chuck Donnelly, a church official, informs them that Shaw has fled to Istanbul. There, an assassin sent by Farouk tries to poison him, but Danny and Lexi are able to steal the antidote and save his life again. With Castillo's help, Danny determines two things: Farouk wants to weaponize the curse of Cleopatra and Antony and the cult that killed the Nazis is the key to finding the bodies.
2	2	"Code of the Hawaladar"	Alrick Riley	Taylor Elmore	May 28, 2019	103	4.23
Gwen brings Danny and Lexi into an operation to capture Farouk alongside Asim Masood, an intelligence officer who previously worked with Danny. Danny tries to pose as Shaw to obtain a new lead on Farouk in Paris, but his cover is blown and only Gwen's intervention saves his life. Lexi warns Danny of her suspicions that Asim is a mole for Farouk. Later, she breaks into Chuck's apartment for help analyzing a ledger, and he helps her deduce the language it's written in as Sumerian. Combined with information provided by a detainee who Danny is able to convince to trust him, the team finds one of Farouk's hideouts in Rome. Asim confesses to Danny that he is not authorized to hunt Farouk, but is doing so anyway because someone in the Egyptian government has blocked every one of his attempts to investigate him. He then dies while shielding Lexi from a grenade blast while raiding the hideout, leaving her feeling guilty for suspecting him. Danny realizes that Farouk's intentions may involve trying to ignite war between the West and the Muslim world, unaware that Fabi, Gwen's colleague and a spy for the cult, is listening.
3	3	"The Secret of Macho Grande"	Tawnia McKiernan	Lara Olsen	June 4, 2019	104	4.30
Fabi finds Max Najjar, a cult operative posing as Castillo's research assistant, in Tripoli and executes him for informing on the group to Farouk in return for his life. Pretending to be married, Danny and Lexi travel to an Austrian castle used by the Nazis to store Cleopatra's body, and learn that her body was moved by a member of the Kreisau Circle. Gwen and Fabi track down Najjar's contact Simon Hardwick, a British smuggler Danny once rescued from Farouk, and he advises them to investigate the cult, which he names as the Brotherhood of Serapis. Danny confronts Lexi over her desire to kill Farouk, which clashes with his plan to bring him to justice. Chuck uses his ties to the Jesuits to decipher a code left by the Circle, revealing the location of an abandoned German tank depot; a false wall reveals a secret elevator to an underground vault where Danny finds part of Cleopatra's sarcophagus. Farouk and his second-in-command Omar ambush them and seal off their exit route, so Lexi tries to escape through the roof only to be tasered and captured by two men while Danny winds up trapped in the vault when the ladder breaks.
4	4	"The Brotherhood of Serapis"	Tawnia McKiernan	Javier Grillo-Marxuach	June 11, 2019	105	3.75
Reece saves Danny; Lexi is taken to Fabi, who offers her a chance to work with him to kill Farouk. She's to accompany Danny and Reece at a reception in Geneva, and find Sharif Ghazal, an Egyptian official and Farouk mole positioned to acquire relics from Cleopatra's tomb that Danny previously recovered. While in transit, the convoy is ambushed by Farouk's men, but when Danny examines the scene, he realizes that the relics are fake and that Farouk already has the originals. Reece pressures him and Lexi to stay silent. Lexi makes a copy of Ghazal's fingerprint and lies to Danny, telling him that her "sources" tipped her to his treachery. Danny agrees to distract him while she searches his office, which turns up a letter implying that Farouk knew her father and that he provided financial support long before Danny approached him; Serapis operatives then intercept them and steal Lexi's phone with all her intel, while also stealing train logs from the depot. Ignoring Reece's pleas, a tired Castillo quits the team. Fabi provides Lexi with a burner phone and tells her to stay in touch if she wants to find Farouk.
5	5	"The Ghost Train of Sierra Perdida"	Craig Siebels	Gaia Violo	June 18, 2019	106	3.76
The team learns that Farouk is selling the relics to socialite Jessica Wong; Fabi sends Danny and Lexi to infiltrate her upcoming soirée. Lexi runs into Simon at the party, and learns that he is also hunting for Cleopatra. The pair gets their covers blown, but trick Wong into handing over a map of land she purchased for Farouk in Spain. There, they come across a local legend, the "Ghost Train", which disappeared in 1944; Danny suspects that this is the missing Nazi train that carried Cleopatra's sarcophagus out of Germany. Realizing that Farouk is looking in the wrong place, they find the train, but the sarcophagus is gone and Mafia don Carlo Valardi (who had been trying to extort Farouk for protection money) captures them. Omar shows up and forces them to excavate the train. Using a Molotov cocktail as a distraction, they escape while Omar kills Carlo's son Luca in a firefight. A forger Lexi asked to restore the letter informs her it is a fake, and Fabi tells her to work with him if she wants to know the full truth. That evening, Simon provides her with a document implying that her father was a member of the Brotherhood.
6	6	"Escape from Casablanca"	Craig Siebels	Siavash Farahani & Dana Farahani	June 25, 2019	107	3.20
Danny and Lexi trace the Nazis to Casablanca, but Gwen files a red notice for the incident in Spain, forcing them to hide in a UN refugee camp. A doctor there directs them to Salim Le Mer, a mobster and bar owner, and Danny gets Shaw, who is working as Le Mer's entertainer, to arrange a meeting. Carlo is offering Le Mer a reward for their heads, so Danny convinces him to help by claiming to know where Cleopatra is. The police catch up to them just as they find the sarcophagus, which turns out to only be the outer layer; Danny gets Gwen to leak this information to Farouk for a trap. That night, he and Lexi confess their feelings for each other and kiss. Danny later finds the burner phone, and when Lexi refuses to reveal who gave it to her, he tells her to stay behind. Nevertheless, she follows him as he and Gwen capture Omar. Gwen arrests Danny as well, and puts him on a plane with Omar and Carlo, while Lexi turns herself in after arranging for Shaw to fly the doctor to her family in Oslo. A bug planted by Simon reveals that the Brotherhood is hiding something about Reza Vaziri's death.
7	7	"The Lunchbox of Destiny"	Holly Dale	Kevin Chesley & Bryan Shukoff	July 2, 2019	108	3.42
In Rome, FBI agent Harper offers Danny a deal: freedom if he persuades his dying father Patrick to locate ten missing paintings from his last job, a 1997 museum heist in Boston. He refuses to talk, but tells Danny (in code) to visit his condemned childhood home, which brings up painful memories. There, he and Lexi find a photo of Danny's late mother with a name written on the back, before narrowly escaping an ambush by mercenaries seemingly sent by Farouk. Patrick's brother Chappie reveals that a dirty cop, Tim Keeler, organized the heist, but as Keeler is living in Cuba outside FBI jurisdiction, Harper insists they catch him personally. Danny reveals a secret to Lexi: he was the one who turned his father in twenty-two years earlier. The mercenaries catch up with them and kill Keeler, but Danny and Lexi recover nine of the paintings and return them; Patrick is moved to a proper hospital and makes amends with his son. Harper gives Danny a file; Gwen realizes Fabi is a spy when Danny passes her his number from Lexi's phone. Farouk has his assassin poison Omar and finishes development of a new, lethal bioweapon.
8	8	"The Shadow of Projekt Athena"	Holly Dale	Nazrin Choudhury	July 9, 2019	109	2.69
Danny and Lexi ask Fabi for help tracking the Nazis, just before Gwen arrests him. Undeterred, they travel to Poland searching for paranoid ex-Nazi hunter Moshe Cohen, who identifies the man who took Cleopatra as Col. Jurgen Steiner and helps them track him to a rural town in Quebec that was a secret haven for escaped Nazis; Fabi escapes custody and follows them. Danny persuades a sympathetic local to reveal the location of an old weather station linked to the 1945 dam collapse that wiped out the town. The station caretaker, Georges Larose, turns out to be a descendant of the Nazis who triggered the accident and he tortures Danny while Fabi rescues Lexi. Larose takes Lexi hostage; she stabs him and Fabi shoots him dead, though not before sustaining a fatal wound to the heart. Dying, he tells Lexi that her mother Jamilla, not her father, was part of the Brotherhood and was murdered by Larose while on a mission with him years earlier. Cohen burns a box of medals, one of which has Steiner's name on it. Danny gives Lexi Fabi's Brotherhood medallion to return so she can get answers about her mother's death.
9	9	"The Wages of Vengeance"	Guy Norman Bee	Kevin Chesley & Bryan Shukoff & Javier Grillo-Marxuach	July 16, 2019	110	2.45
A Brotherhood agent, Alina, secretly reveals to Danny that Farouk was a CIA contractor who turned to terrorism after his family was killed; this gives Lexi the idea to track him through Nadia, his only other living relative. A trap is set, but Farouk escapes thanks to a last-minute intervention by his lieutenant Taj. Chuck advises Gwen to go around the uncooperative carabinieri by breaking into Fabi's sealed apartment, which nets her a cache of secret documents. Danny and Lexi recruit Simon to help them find Farouk, who has returned to his base in Cyprus; he warns them that they cannot trust the Brotherhood to have their best interests at heart. Farouk is killed in the ensuring firefight, and Antony's sarcophagus is recovered. Danny and Gwen patch up their relationship. Lexi learns that, through her mother, she is a direct descendant of Cleopatra and destined to serve the purpose of the Brotherhood: to preserve the collective knowledge of mankind. Interpol locates Farouk's bio-lab in Russia, leading Danny to conclude that Farouk's followers intend to finish what he started.
10	10	"Return of the Queen"	Guy Norman Bee	Dana Farahani & Siavash Farahani	July 23, 2019	111	2.90
Roarke attacks Gwen in her apartment and steals back the documents. Danny and Lexi race to find Cleopatra before Taj can, and have Carlo introduce them to Soledad Sanchez, whose father, drug lord Everado Sanchez, was the last known owner of Cleopatra's sarcophagus. Accompanied by Shaw, they travel to a remote island in the Caribbean where Shaw's trusted contact Enrique Vega guides them to a secret cave where Everado's plane crashed in 1993. Along with his remains, they find Cleopatra before Enrique double-crosses them; he is killed while hauling the sarcophagus away by unknown assailants who make off with the prize. A humbled Shaw offers to help Danny and Lexi unconditionally. Informed that she has been recalled by Interpol, Gwen persuades the carabinieri to authorize a sting targeting Roarke, who escapes but leaves behind a cufflink that Danny recognizes as one of many that Reece has given out to his friends and associates over the years. With news that Antony's body has disappeared as well, the group begins to suspect that Reece may be pulling the strings behind Farouk's organization.
11	11	"Legacy of the Father"	Steve Boyum	Teleplay by : Matthew Federman & Stephen Scaia; Story by : David Jurmain	July 30, 2019	112	2.72
Danny and Lexi are divided on whether Reece is truly responsible for Farouk's actions or if he is being manipulated by the Brotherhood; unable to reconcile their differences, they split up with Gwen and Lexi going after Ghazal and Shaw assisting Danny. The two teams converge on the same house, where they catch Reece's head of security, Yates, trying to escape after killing Ghazal; he is run over and killed before they can question him. A trace of his phone leads to Reece's old apartment, where Danny finds the tenth painting from the museum heist and realizes that Reece, not Keeler, organized the job that put his father away. Simon contacts them with the location of the sarcophagi in a Paris bank; Danny, Lexi, and Shaw stage a robbery and verify his information before Gwen extracts them. Reece confesses to stealing the painting and agrees to turn himself in once he completes preparations for a public unveiling of Antony and Cleopatra. Chuck sends Castillo proof that Karim Farouk is Reece's illegitimate son. When Castillo, unwisely, confronts her old friend, Reece kills her with poisoned wine and burns the papers.
12	12	"The Revenge of Farouk"	Steve Boyum	Matthew Federman & Stephen Scaia	August 6, 2019	113	2.72
Alina and a team of Brotherhood operatives are killed by hidden explosives while trying to destroy the bioweapon; with Farouk's plan seemingly foiled, Reece decides not to call off the unveiling. Gwen looks into Ghazal's files, determining that Reece not only helped Farouk evade Danny in the past, but also had Reza killed when he discovered his secret. The team devises a plan to expose Reece by needling him into recording a confession, but when Gwen reports that the bioweapon wasn't destroyed, Danny puts the pieces together: Simon is the real Farouk, is Reece's true biological son, and has usurped control of the terrorists to exact revenge on his father. Danny, Lexi, and Chuck are captured by Roarke; Shaw rescues them. Lexi subdues Roarke in a fight while Danny and the police take out Taj and his men. Danny contemplates letting Reece die from the toxin, but Lexi injects him with the antidote so he can be tried for his crimes. Weeks later, Danny, wearing an Interpol badge, leads a task force to take Simon into custody; he promises Danny and Lexi that they will meet again.

=== Season 2 (2022) ===
No. overall	No. in season	Title	Directed by	Written by	Original release date	Prod. code
13	1	"The Soul of Genghis Khan"	Stephen Scaia	Matthew Federman & Stephen Scaia	July 17, 2022	201
14	2	"Tales of the Golden Tiger"	Stephen Scaia; Steve Boyum	Jose Molina	July 17, 2022	202
15	3	"Spoils of the Red Empire"	Joel Novoa	Josh Schaer	July 24, 2022	203
16	4	"Into the Forbidden Zone"	Joel Novoa	Kevin Chesley & Bryan Shukoff	July 31, 2022	204
17	5	"Enter the Dragon Gate"	Wayne Rose	Sandra Chwialkowska	August 7, 2022	205
18	6	"Mystery at Poison Island"	Wayne Rose	Juliana James	August 14, 2022	206
19	7	"The Ravens of Shangri-La"	Stephen Scaia	Tiffany Lo & Ethel Lung	August 21, 2022	207
20	8	"The Lost City of Sana"	Stephen Scaia	John Lamm	August 28, 2022	208
21	9	"The Throne of the Khan"	Maja Vrvilo	Matt Okumura	September 4, 2022	209
22	10	"The Secret History of the Mongols"	Maja Vrvilo	Sandra Chwialkowska	September 11, 2022	210
23	11	"Raid on the Hidden Fortress"	April Mullen	Jose Molina	September 18, 2022	211
24	12	"The Year of the Rat"	April Mullen	Kevin Chesley & Bryan Shukoff	September 25, 2022	212
25	13	"Showdown in Hong Kong"	Steve Boyum	Matthew Federman	October 2, 2022	213

== Production ==
=== Development ===
On November 30, 2017, it was announced that CBS had given a series order to Blood & Treasure, a new television series created and written by Matthew Federman and Stephen Scaia. The series order was reportedly for a first season of thirteen episodes in which Federman and Scaia will also executive produce alongside Taylor Elmore, Ben Silverman, Marc Webb, and Mark Vlasic. Webb is also set to direct the series as well. Production companies involved in the series include CBS Television Studios. On March 26, 2019, it was announced that the series is set to premiere on May 21, 2019.

On June 26, 2019, CBS renewed the series for a second season. On May 17, 2022, it was reported that the series is moving from CBS to Paramount+ and is set to premiere on July 17 with two new episodes and the rest debuting on a weekly basis. On February 17, 2023, Paramount+ opted not to return for a third season.

=== Casting ===
On March 12, 2018, it was announced that Katia Winter, Michael James Shaw, and James Callis had been cast in series regular roles. On May 18, 2018, it was reported that Sofia Pernas had joined the main cast in the lead female role. On June 15, 2018, it was announced that Matt Barr had been cast in the series' lead male role. On July 25, 2018, it was reported that Alicia Coppola had joined the main cast. On August 28, 2018, it was announced that Anna Silk had been cast in a recurring role. On January 31, 2020, Paget Brewster was cast in a recurring capacity for the second season, but she was unavailable due to the COVID-19 pandemic and replaced by Francesca Romana De Martini.

=== Filming ===
Principal photography for the first season took place in the summer of 2018 in Montreal, Canada, Rome, Turin, Venice, Italy, Gressoney Saint-Jean, Vatican City, Marrakesh, and Tangier, Morocco. Youssef Louchi served as location manager on the series. Filming for the second season began in October 2019.

== Reception ==
=== Critical response ===
On review aggregation Rotten Tomatoes, the series holds an approval rating of 54% with an average rating of 5.78/10, based on 13 reviews. The critics consensus states, "Blood & Treasure never finds the X that marks the sweet spot, but viewers who heed an undemanding call to adventure may find some charm in the series' concept." Metacritic, which uses a weighted average, assigned the series a score of 52 out of 100 based on 7 critics, indicating "mixed or average reviews".

=== Ratings ===
Viewership and ratings per episode of Blood & Treasure
No.	Title	Air date	Rating/share (18–49)	Viewers (millions)	DVR (18–49)	DVR viewers (millions)	Total (18–49)	Total viewers (millions)
1	"The Curse of Cleopatra: Parts I & II"	May 21, 2019	0.6/3	5.62	0.4	2.42	1.0	8.04
2	"Code of the Hawaladar"	May 28, 2019	0.5/3	4.23	0.3	2.09	0.8	6.32
3	"The Secret of Macho Grande"	June 4, 2019	0.5/3	4.30	0.3	1.98	0.8	6.28
4	"The Brotherhood of Serapis"	June 11, 2019	0.4/2	3.75	0.3	1.92	0.7	5.66
5	"The Ghost Train of Sierra Perdida"	June 18, 2019	0.4/2	3.76	0.2	1.81	0.6	5.56
6	"Escape from Casablanca"	June 25, 2019	0.4/2	3.20	0.2	1.71	0.6	4.92
7	"The Lunchbox of Destiny"	July 2, 2019	0.4/2	3.42	0.3	1.68	0.6	5.10
8	"The Shadow of Projekt Athena"	July 9, 2019	0.3/2	2.69	0.2	1.69	0.5	4.38
9	"The Wages of Vengeance"	July 16, 2019	0.4/2	2.45	0.2	1.49	0.6	3.94
10	"Return of the Queen"	July 23, 2019	0.3/2	2.90	0.2	1.51	0.5	4.41
11	"Legacy of the Father"	July 30, 2019	0.3/2	2.72	0.2	1.43	0.5	4.15
12	"The Revenge of Farouk"	August 6, 2019	0.3/2	2.72	0.2	1.43	0.5	4.15
