= Michael James Shaw =

American actor and writer

- Born: September 16, 1986 (age 39); Ocala, FL, U.S.
- Education: Howard University (BFA); Juilliard School (MFA)
- Occupations: Actor; writer; producer
- Years active: 2008–present

Michael James Shaw (born September 16, 1986) is an American actor and writer. He is best known for his roles as Mercer in the TV series The Walking Dead and as Corvus Glaive in the Marvel Cinematic Universe films Avengers: Infinity War and Avengers: Endgame.

== Early life ==
Shaw's very first starring role was as the Big Bad Wolf in his Kindergarten production of The Three Piggy Opera at Madison Street School of Basics Plus in Ocala, Florida. Shaw graduated from Vanguard High School in 2005. Upon graduating from High School, Shaw spent his undergraduate years at Howard University. He then took a masters program at Juilliard School.

== Filmography ==
=== Film ===
Year	Title	Role	Notes
2018	Avengers: Infinity War	Corvus Glaive	Motion capture and voice
2019	Avengers: Endgame	Corvus Glaive	Motion capture and voice

=== Television ===
Year	Title	Role	Notes
2008	The Wire	Homeless Man	Uncredited
2011	Today _ _ cks	Carter	Short film
2012	Brutus	Caesar	Short film
2012	Lispenard	Samba	Short film
2014	Don-o-mite	Don-o-mite	Short film
2014	Roulette	Jason	Short film; also writer
2014–2015	Constantine	Papa Midnite	3 episodes
2015–2016	Limitless	FBI Agent Daryl / "Mike"	14 episodes
2016	Roots	Marcellus	Episode: "Part 3"
2016	Desire in New York	Jay	Television film
2017	Bull	FBI Agent Rick Jarvis	2 episodes
2017	Blue Bloods	Ronald Lloyd: Warrior Kings Gang Boss	Episode: "In and Out"
2019–2022	Blood & Treasure	Aiden Shaw	Main role
2019	The Enemy Within	Desmond Visser	2 episodes
2021–2022	The Walking Dead	Michael Mercer	15 episodes
2024	Fight Night: The Million Dollar Heist	Lamar	7 episodes
2025	Twisted Metal	Axel	7 episodes
