= Acheron: Part II =

- The Walking Dead episode
- Episode no.: Season 11; Episode 2
- Directed by: Kevin Dowling
- Written by: Angela Kang; Jim Barnes
- Cinematography by: Duane Charles Manwiller
- Editing by: Alan Cody; Brad Stencil
- Original air dates: August 22, 2021 (AMC+); August 29, 2021 (AMC)
- Running time: 51 minutes

Guest appearances
- C. Thomas Howell as Roy; Jackson Pace as Gage; Glenn Stanton as Frost; Okea Eme-Akwari as Elijah; Laurie Fortier as Agatha; James Devoti as Cole; Chelle Ramos as Shira; Carrie Genzel as Clark; Marcus Lewis as Duncan; Matthew Cornwell as Evans; Mariana Novak as Female Trooper; Marcello Audino as Trooper Vazquez

Episode chronology
← Previous "Acheron: Part I"	Next → "Hunted"
- The Walking Dead (season 11)

"Acheron: Part II" is the second episode of the eleventh season of the post-apocalyptic horror television series The Walking Dead. The second of a two-part season premiere, the episode was written by showrunner Angela Kang and Jim Barnes, and directed by Kevin Dowling. "Acheron: Part II" was released on the streaming platform AMC+ on August 22, 2021, before airing on AMC on August 29, 2021. The first part aired on AMC one week earlier.

In the episode, continuing where the previous episode left off, the group led by Maggie (Lauren Cohan) is trapped inside an underground subway car surrounded by lurking walkers. With very little ammo and energy remaining, the group must ready themselves as the undead have found a way inside the subway train. Elsewhere, Yumiko (Eleanor Matsuura) challenges the process at the Commonwealth outpost, which threatens her future and that of Eugene (Josh McDermitt), Ezekiel (Khary Payton), and Princess (Paola Lázaro).

The episode received generally positive reviews from critics, though many felt that splitting the episode into two parts was unnecessary.

== Plot ==
Underneath a subway car, Maggie fends off a small swarm of walkers. Inside the subway car, the remaining members of the group drop down from a ceiling hatch as walkers surround the car outside. Gabriel asks Negan where Maggie is, but Negan implies he doesn't know. Meanwhile, Daryl breaks his way through a tunnel wall with Dog, finding a makeshift homeless shelter. A man's scream echoes through the tunnels, prompting Dog to run off; Daryl follows Dog's barks in the distance.

Meanwhile at the Commonwealth, Yumiko, Eugene, and Princess discuss Ezekiel's disappearance, with Yumiko leaving to be interviewed by the auditors. She explains in the interrogation room that she was a criminal defense lawyer before the apocalypse, and has reason to believe her brother is living at the Commonwealth and looking for her; she requests expedited processing for her group.

In the subway car, the group is planning their escape when Maggie climbs into the car through a floor hatch. Maggie attacks Negan and reveals that he "left her to die", but Negan disagrees, asserting that he merely "chose not to help." Before Maggie can press further, Gage interrupts them from a neighboring car, pounding on the door and begging for help as walkers close in on him. Negan and Duncan try to pry the door open, but Maggie warns them that if they open it, the walkers could get in and they don't have the ammo to clear them out. Gage desperately apologizes and begs Maggie for another chance, but she refuses. Gage then stabs himself in the heart before being devoured by the walkers as the group watches. While Gabriel thinks that Gage was a "coward", Alden thinks that Gage was scared and didn't deserve to die; this causes Maggie to tell the group a story from when she and Hershel were alone on the road, where she discovered horrifically mutilated, pregnant walkers, which she believes is a worse way to die than what Gage went through.

Daryl and Dog come across a bloody trail and discover Roy. Inside the train car, Duncan and Frost force open the hinge to the next car's door, but the path is blocked. The pressure of the walkers on the opposite door, including a zombified Gage, eventually causes the door to break. Gabriel fends the walkers off with a shotgun, and Maggie gives Negan a gun to help kill the herd. Daryl hears the gunshots and runs to their side of the train, where he's able to cut through the herd from behind, pry the door open, and free the trapped survivors. Daryl kills the rest of the walkers with a grenade as the team regroups outside of the car, by the exit of the subway tunnels.

Back at the compound, Eugene is taken to a room for further questioning by General Mercer and an auditor. Eugene is intimidated by Mercer, who demands to know where his settlement is, and why he was at the train station. Eugene tells the truth, breaking down in the process. Afterwards, in the daylight, a wagon transports Eugene to a boxcar, where he is reunited with Yumiko, Princess, and Ezekiel. Mercer then tells the group that they have successfully completed processing and will be escorted to orientation. A woman (Chelle Ramos) then enters and asks for Eugene; he raises his hand. The woman introduces herself as Stephanie.

After Negan gives the gun back to Maggie, she decides to detour the group to Arbor Hills, explaining that Georgie left a hidden supply depot there containing ammo, food, and weapons, where they can resupply and rest before continuing to Meridian. On the road, the group discovers dozens of bodies strung up by their ankles hanging from roadside trees. Suddenly, Roy is shot in the head with an arrow and a flying blade hits Cole in the thigh and cuts his hand off. The group flees for cover and scatter into the woods as a group of Reapers reveal themselves.

== Production ==
The episode features the deaths of Gage and Roy, played by Jackson Pace and C. Thomas Howell, respectively. Both had made appearances on the series as far back as the ninth season, first appearing together in the episode "Stradivarius".

The episode's title, "Acheron", refers to one of the rivers in Greek mythology that is said to flow through the underworld. The "Acheron" is also sometimes called the river of pain or woe. It is also a real river in Greece.

== Reception ==
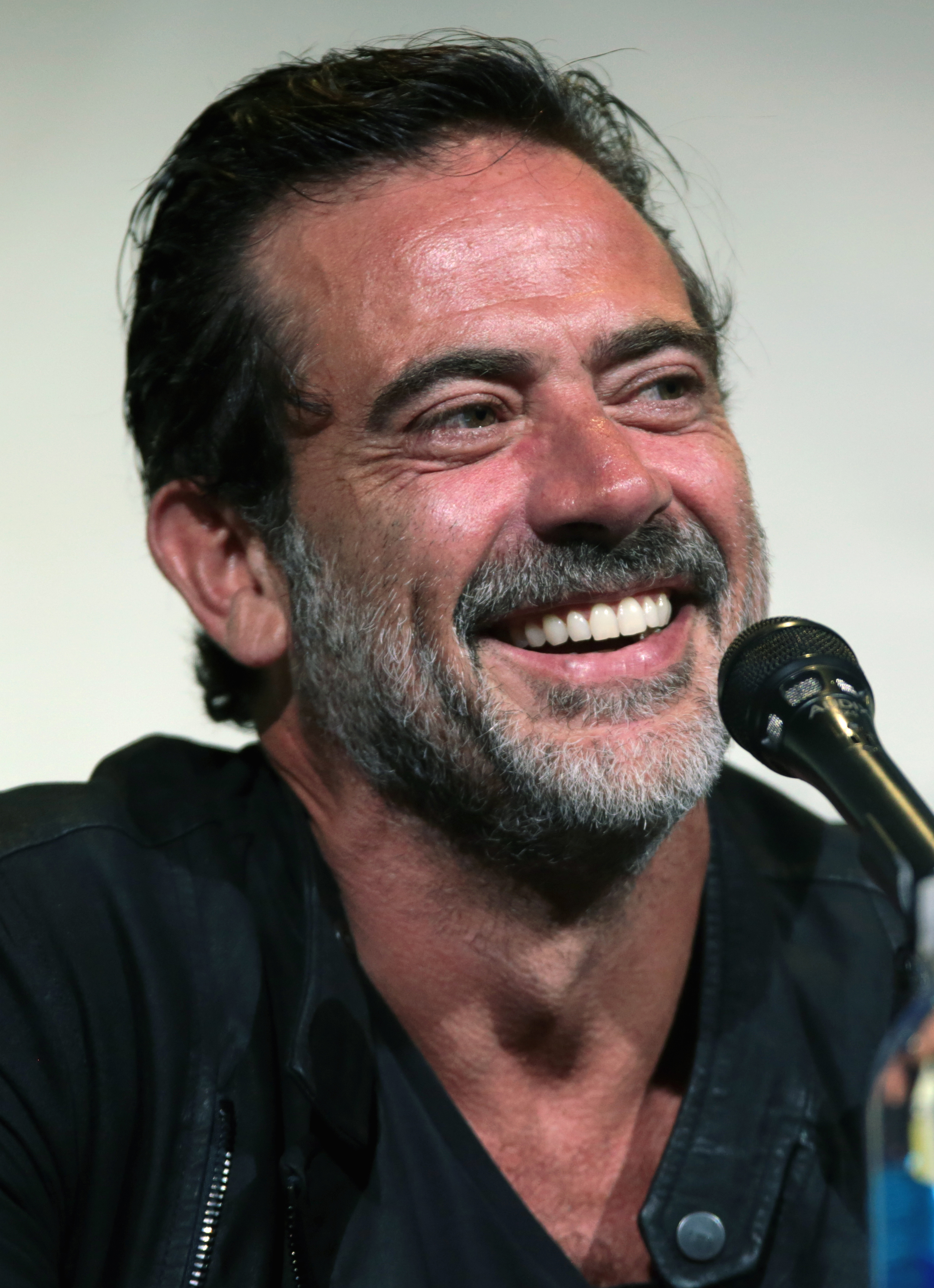
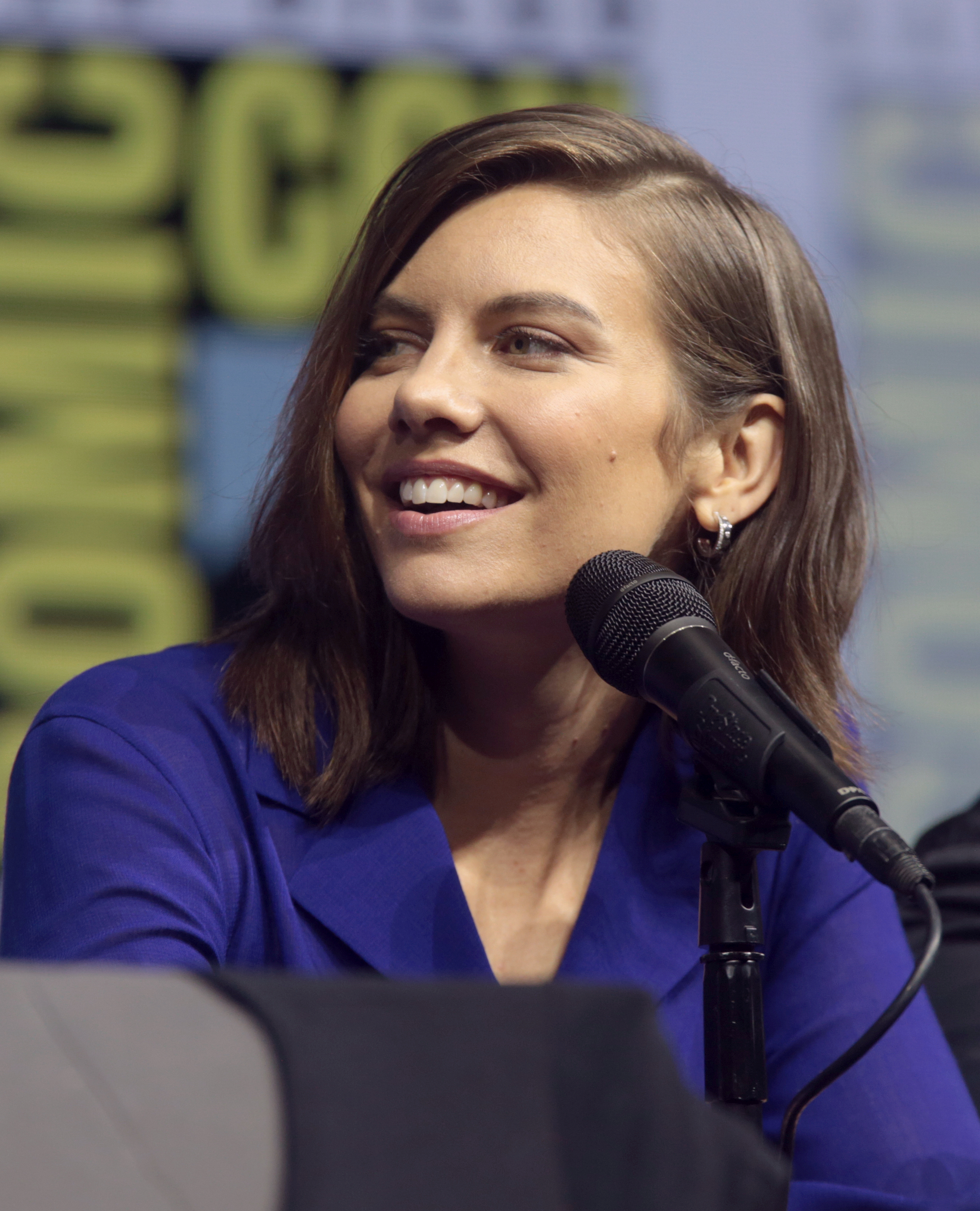
The development of Jeffrey Dean Morgan, and Lauren Cohan's characters were praised by critics.

=== Critical reception ===
The episode received generally positive reviews from critics. On Rotten Tomatoes, the episode has an approval rating of 91% with an average score of 7.9 out of 10, based on 11 reviews. The site's critical consensus reads: "Maggie veers into the dark side in a tense episode that features a show-stopping set piece on a train and intriguing shades of moral gray."

Ron Hogan of Den of Geek gave the episode 4 out of 5 stars, writing: "The second part of Jim Dowling's episode works well because it's so competently set up by the first half." He also praised Dowling's direction, Josh McDermitt's performance, and the character development of Negan. Writing for Forbes, Erik Kain wrote that he "enjoyed the episode a lot", but again criticized the decision to split the episode into two parts. He continued by writing: "I think we viewers would appreciate just a tiny bit more quality control in the script department is all I'm saying."

Writing for The A.V. Club, Alex McLevy gave the episode a grade of "B−" and also praised Negan's character development, and wrote that Negan's decision to leave Maggie for dead felt true to his character, though felt that some scenes with the Commonwealth were tiresome, and that Eugene's speech and breakdown "felt awfully over the top". Writing for Filmspeak, Zach Marsh gave the episode a B+, writing: "It's a relief to see that 'Part II' stuck the landing, and it leaves me feeling as excited for what comes next in 'The Walking Dead' as I have ever been."

=== Ratings ===
The episode was seen by 1.99 million viewers in the United States on its original air date. This was a decrease in viewership from the previous episode, which had 2.22 million viewers.
