= Jericho (2006 TV series) =

American television series

- Genre: Post-apocalyptic; Action; Drama; Science fiction
- Created by: Stephen Chbosky; Josh Schaer; Jonathan E. Steinberg
- Starring: Skeet Ulrich; Ashley Scott; Lennie James; Michael Gaston; Sprague Grayden; Erik Knudsen; Kenneth Mitchell; Brad Beyer; Shoshannah Stern; Pamela Reed; Gerald McRaney; Alicia Coppola
- Country of origin: United States
- Original language: English
- No. of seasons: 2
- No. of episodes: 29 (list of episodes)

Production
- Executive producers: Jon Turteltaub; Stephen Chbosky; Carol Barbee; Karim Zreik
- Running time: 43 minutes
- Production companies: CBS Paramount Network Television; Junction Entertainment; Fixed Mark Productions

Original release
- Network: CBS
- Release: September 20, 2006 – March 25, 2008

Jericho is an American post-apocalyptic action drama television series, which centers on the residents of the fictional city of Jericho, Kansas, in the aftermath of a nuclear attack on 23 major cities in the contiguous United States. It was produced by CBS Paramount Network Television and Junction Entertainment, with executive producers Jon Turteltaub, Stephen Chbosky, and Carol Barbee. It was shown in more than 30 countries.

Jericho ran from September 20, 2006, to March 25, 2008, on CBS. It was cancelled after its first full season because of low ratings. A fan campaign persuaded the network to bring the show back for another season, of seven episodes, after which it was cancelled again. In November 2008, TV Guide reported that The CW would air repeats of Jericho to replace the canceled series Valentine. In 2007, Jericho was ranked number 11 on TV Guide's Top Cult Shows Ever. In 2009, plans were announced for a feature film based on the series, that was later cancelled, and a continuation of the Jericho storylines in a comic book series. IDW Publishing released a new comic book series for Season 3 (in 2009) and Season 4 in August 2012.

== Synopsis ==
=== First season ===
The storyline centers on the residents of Jericho, a small northwest Kansas town, in the aftermath of a nuclear attack on twenty-three American cities in the contiguous United States as the President is giving an address to Congress. The series begins with the sighting of a mushroom cloud of unknown origin over Denver, Colorado. Initially, it is assumed to be an accident, until a teenager reveals a recording of a phone call from his mother in Atlanta, Georgia, which is cut off by the sound of an explosion – demonstrating that the Denver disaster was not isolated, and thus unlikely to be accidental.

Problems are compounded by loss of power and modern communications, effectively isolating Jericho. Later, power is restored to Jericho by what is alluded to the efforts of the U.S. government but an electromagnetic pulse (EMP) from an unknown source disables all electronics. ICBMs are also seen being launched into the sky.

While the first few episodes center on restoring life, following the attacks, about halfway through the season some citizens of Jericho meet with citizens of a nearby town, New Bern. At first, relations are established, resulting in a trade of windmills (for power), built in New Bern's factory, for supplies for food from Jericho's farms and salt from its mine (neither of which New Bern could supply on its own). Relations begin to sour as New Bern puts the blame on Jericho for its problems and the New Bern sheriff eventually declares war, leading to the season's climax.

Themes regularly addressed in the show include the gathering of information, community identity, public order, limited resources, the value of family, hardships of fatherhood and internal and external threats. The show also features several mysteries involving the backgrounds of major characters, the perpetrators of the attack and the extent of damage to the United States and its government.

The pivotal character in the story is Jake Green, the 32-year-old son of Mayor Johnston Green. Jake had fled the town of Jericho five years earlier, after he became mixed up with the wrong people and was involved in questionable activity. He briefly returns home to claim his inheritance, before being stranded by the catastrophe. After a somewhat awkward return home and a tense reunion with his father, Jake steps up to become a leader in Jericho, fighting to protect the town and its citizens. As the people of Jericho struggle to survive in a changed world, most remain unaware that one of the newest residents, Robert Hawkins, knows a lot more about the attacks than he is letting on. It is later revealed that he is in possession of an unexploded nuclear bomb, intended for the attack, but how he obtained it and his allegiance remain unclear.

Johnston' mayoral opponent, Gray Anderson, encounters a Federal Emergency Management Agency (FEMA) camp outside of Topeka, where he learns that the attack on New York City was foiled by alert New York City Police who arrested the bombers before they could detonate the 20-kiloton nuclear bomb in the back of a van. Anderson also reports that Washington, D.C. has been bombed. On the way back from the FEMA camp, Anderson's car is stolen by looters and he is forced to walk home to Jericho. Anderson also discovered that Lawrence, Kansas, was targeted, and that the governor is missing. Robert Hawkins receives a Morse code message on a ham radio stating that Denver, Atlanta, Chicago, Philadelphia, Kansas City, San Diego and several more cities (not shown) have been destroyed. A black box flight data recorder that Jake recovers from a crashed airliner indicates that air traffic control is non-existent, a mushroom cloud was seen rising 16 km (9.9 mi) into the atmosphere and that flashes had also been seen towards Texas. A radiation-burn victim walks into Jericho from Denver, leading a rescue party to Bear Lake, but the 20 radiation-burn victims there are dead. Before the unnamed radiation-burn victim dies, while he is interrogated by Hawkins, it is revealed that he is an accomplice of Hawkins and that there is a traitor in his past.

When Johnston falls ill, Jake and Eric drive to the nearby city of Rogue River for medical supplies, only to discover that the town was evacuated by FEMA. Searching through the abandoned hospital, they find that much of the staff and patients were massacred by Ravenwood, a private military company that was hired by the government to assist in the town's evacuation. After encountering a former Ravenwood mercenary and the only remaining doctor, it is revealed that Ravenwood men disobeyed orders and began stealing supplies for themselves, leading to the massacre. Ravenwood forces return to the hospital, but the surviving mercenary holds them off, allowing the brothers and the doctor to escape to Jericho and save Johnston. However, Eric loses his driver's license in Rogue River, leading Ravenwood to Jericho. Only after Jake threatens to destroy the only bridge into Jericho does Ravenwood withdraw.

When Jake and a few others drive to a trading post north of Jericho, they discover that the former government is now fractured into multiple factions, with the former Secretary of Health and Human Services (who was the designated survivor during the Presidential address when the nuclear attacks occurred) being seen as the one with the most legitimate claim.

In the first season finale, armed residents of New Bern attack Jericho with crude mortars made at the factories in New Bern. The mortar bombardment injure people in Jericho. Jake and Johnston Green along with Robert Hawkins lead a counter-attack on New Bern's forces outside of town, killing many of the attackers; Johnston Green is fatally wounded. Army units arrive to separate the combatants just as the season ends.

=== Second season ===
Flag of the Allied States of America

The military forces of the new Allied States of America (ASA), which now govern most of what was formerly the Western United States, except the independent Republic of Texas, have restored order to Jericho and its hinterland, putting an abrupt end to the conflict between Jericho and its rival town, New Bern. As a semblance of normality returns to Jericho, the plot shifts away from day-to-day survival to life and political intrigue under the ASA government.

The garrison commander of the ASA Army's outpost in Jericho, Major Edward Beck, asks Jake to accept appointment as the Sheriff of Jericho and the county. Jake reluctantly accepts the appointment with reservations about the ASA government's intentions. The ASA accuses North Korea and Iran of being behind the attacks, and subsequently bombed the two countries (the source of the missiles seen in Season 1). Known only to Hawkins and a select few, the September attacks were not a foreign terrorist act but a conspiracy of unknown perpetrators within the highest level of the former U.S. government, including the president and the secretary of defense of the new ASA government. The conspirators distributed stolen Soviet nukes to various domestic terrorist groups and provided them with intelligence. Their exact motives are left unclear. Hawkins, who was previously a CIA agent, had infiltrated the terrorists before the attacks and managed to recover the bomb meant for Columbus, Ohio. He must calculate his every move to avoid capture, piece together the trail of evidence and bring the truth to light, before the conspiracy's mastermind buries it forever.

Jericho's residents deal with the reality of the new ASA government based in Cheyenne, Wyoming. Welcomed as saviors, the government's military and mercenary agents transform life in Jericho into a repressive police state, led by Ravenwood, owned by Jennings & Rall (J&R), which has ties to and sponsors the leaders of the ASA government. A devastating virus begins to spread across the ASA, though the government covers it up and goes as far as to confiscate vaccines that are not approved by J&R. When a Ravenwood contractor kills Bonnie, a deaf farm girl from the outskirts of Jericho, to conceal his embezzlement, the town is put on the edge of revolt as Jake and the deputies protect Mimi, the only witness to Bonnie's murder and the embezzlement.

Jake can no longer tolerate the methods of Ravenwood and the ASA government in Jericho and leads an underground movement to remove them from power in the town. The brother of Bonnie kills the contractor responsible for her murder, which prompts Beck to declare Jake and his men terrorists. He is arrested by Major Beck and interrogated. Jake refuses to break and escapes with the help of his mother and other town residents. The citizens of the town rebel against the local ASA soldiers. All of this causes Major Beck, a decorated former U.S. Army officer, to question his duty to a government that would treat its citizens the way the new ASA government is doing. He orders his men to stand down and return to their garrison.

Hawkins tries to transport the bomb to his contacts in the reborn Republic of Texas. The ASA military is tipped off and after a brief chase, seizes the weapon. Hawkins narrowly escapes and the ASA military then transports the weapon to Cheyenne for safekeeping. He is also contacted by John Smith, a former J&R whistleblower who reveals that he was the one who masterminded the attacks. He explains that he committed them to eliminate J&R's influence on the US government, though the plan has backfired, as J&R now effectively controls the ASA as a puppet state. Smith announces that he intends to use the bomb to destroy Cheyenne and J&R. Knowing that this would only embolden the ASA, Hawkins makes contact with Jake and the two travel to Cheyenne. Once there, Jake and Hawkins retake the bomb from J&R contractors (one of whom is revealed to be Smith, who escapes). Hawkins is wounded in a brief gun battle. The two make it to the Republic of Texas embassy in Cheyenne with the only undetonated bomb (in ASA territory) from the September attacks. The ASA's military is right behind them. The Republic of Texas is considered the swing state in the struggle for power between the Eastern United States, which is led by the legitimate surviving United States government, now governed from Columbus, and the Allied States (separated by the UN monitored Mississippi River). The Texan ambassador in Cheyenne shelters Jake and Hawkins at his embassy, as Texas hasn't decided which government to back yet.

The ambassador informs his military forces at the embassy to tell the ASA forces outside the fence that any incursion into the embassy by ASA troops will be considered an act of war against the Republic of Texas. The ambassador manages quickly to smuggle Jake, Hawkins and the bomb to the Cheyenne airport. At the airport he secures a small diplomatic jet plane to carry Jake, Hawkins and the device to Texas. While they are en route, two ASA F-15 fighters intercept Jake and Hawkins and order them to turn around or be shot down. When Jake refuses to be escorted back to Cheyenne, the two jets drop back to open fire. Two Republic of Texas Air National Guard F-16 fighters suddenly appear and shoot down the ASA planes. Jake and Hawkins make it to Texas with the bomb, which Texan authorities prepare to examine for its origins. One of Hawkins allies tells Jake that once the tests are completed, Texas will side with the Columbus government against the ASA. As Jake and Hawkins are taken away in an ambulance, Hawkins ominously intones that a second American Civil War was always coming and the two of them have made history by giving the United States a fighting chance in the war to come.

=== Third season ===
Season 3 is not a television show, but a six-part comic book series "from the minds" of the original Jericho production team and written by the Jericho writing team.

=== Fourth season ===
Season 4 is a continuation of the comic book series released by IDW Publishing on August 15, 2012. The five issue story picked up after the events of Jericho: Season Three. The comic was written by Kalinda Vazquez, and the process was overseen by the television series' writers.

== Characters and setting ==
From left to right: Rob Hawkins, Gray Anderson (standing), Dale Turner (crouching), Emily Sullivan, Jake Green, Heather Lisinski, Eric Green, Johnston Green, Gail Green, Stanley Richmond, and Bonnie Richmond.

=== Characters ===
Jericho features an ensemble cast of characters, along with a number of minor and recurring roles. The series website listed eleven main cast members. Alicia Coppola moved from a recurring role to a regular character in February 2008. Gerald McRaney did not have a regular role in season 2. Esai Morales was only present in season 2.

- Skeet Ulrich as Jake Green
- Ashley Scott as Emily Sullivan
- Lennie James as Robert Hawkins
- Michael Gaston as Gray Anderson
- Sprague Grayden as Heather Lisinski
- Erik Knudsen as Dale Turner
- Kenneth Mitchell as Eric Green
- Brad Beyer as Stanley Richmond
- Shoshannah Stern as Bonnie Richmond
- Pamela Reed as Gail Green (season 1; recurring season 2)
- Gerald McRaney as Johnston Green (season 1)
- Alicia Coppola as Mimi Clark (season 2; recurring season 1)

=== Setting ===
Jericho, Kansas is a fictional town. It is approximately 47 miles east of the Kansas–Colorado border (which would put it near the location of the real Colby, Kansas). However, a map (episode 3: Jericho is Ness City, Kansas on the map) in the series seems to show Jericho near the junctions of I-70 and US 83. That would place it near the real Oakley. Jericho is 90 miles west of the also fictional Rogue River, Kansas, and around 330 miles from the real Wichita. New Bern, Kansas is a neighboring fictional town which starts a war with Jericho in the wake of the national destruction. Jericho is served by one state highway and the (fictional) Cedar Run Road.

The city's population is mentioned to be almost 5,000 as mentioned in season 1 Ep. 2 "Fallout" (1,000 in 1957). But after the great war between New Bern and Jericho, the population was reduced to 3,000. The city has one grocery store, owned by Gracie Leigh (Beth Grant).

Jericho is run by two mayors throughout the series. Johnston Green (Gerald McRaney) was the mayor at the show opening and for most of season one, but loses the election in the show. Gray Anderson (Michael Gaston), the other electoral candidate, wins the election in the show.

== Production ==
=== Early development ===
The series originated as a feature film idea of co-creators Jonathan Steinberg and Josh Schaer: a post-apocalyptic plot set amidst the trappings of "a little character drama" movie, in the vein of The Day After, Threads, and Testament. However, they soon realized that a two- or two-and-a-half-hour-long film would still not carry the necessary length they felt such a concept required to properly explore the setting and the characters. Thus, Schaer and Steinberg decided to re-conceive the entire project as a television series, producing a treatment out of the original feature screenplay. Director Jon Turteltaub and producer Carol Barbee then entered the picture, the pair having pitched the project to them. Turteltaub soon commissioned writer Stephen Chbosky to pen the pilot teleplay based upon Schaer and Steinberg's series treatment.

One of Chbosky's major contributions to the structure of the series was the introduction of a greater feminine element to the storyline, opining that, "[We] could use some girls, a little kissing, and some laughs." Another significant developmental influence were the September 11 attacks and Hurricane Katrina, and the sense of "[being] a spectator to a disaster, while not quite being part of it." Co-creator Steinberg in particular felt that after 9/11, the United States saw some of the "best of people," and after Hurricane Katrina, some of the "worst of people," and sought to include both in the fabric of Jericho, with Katrina providing "lots of inspiration" for the show's overall premise.

=== Filming locations ===
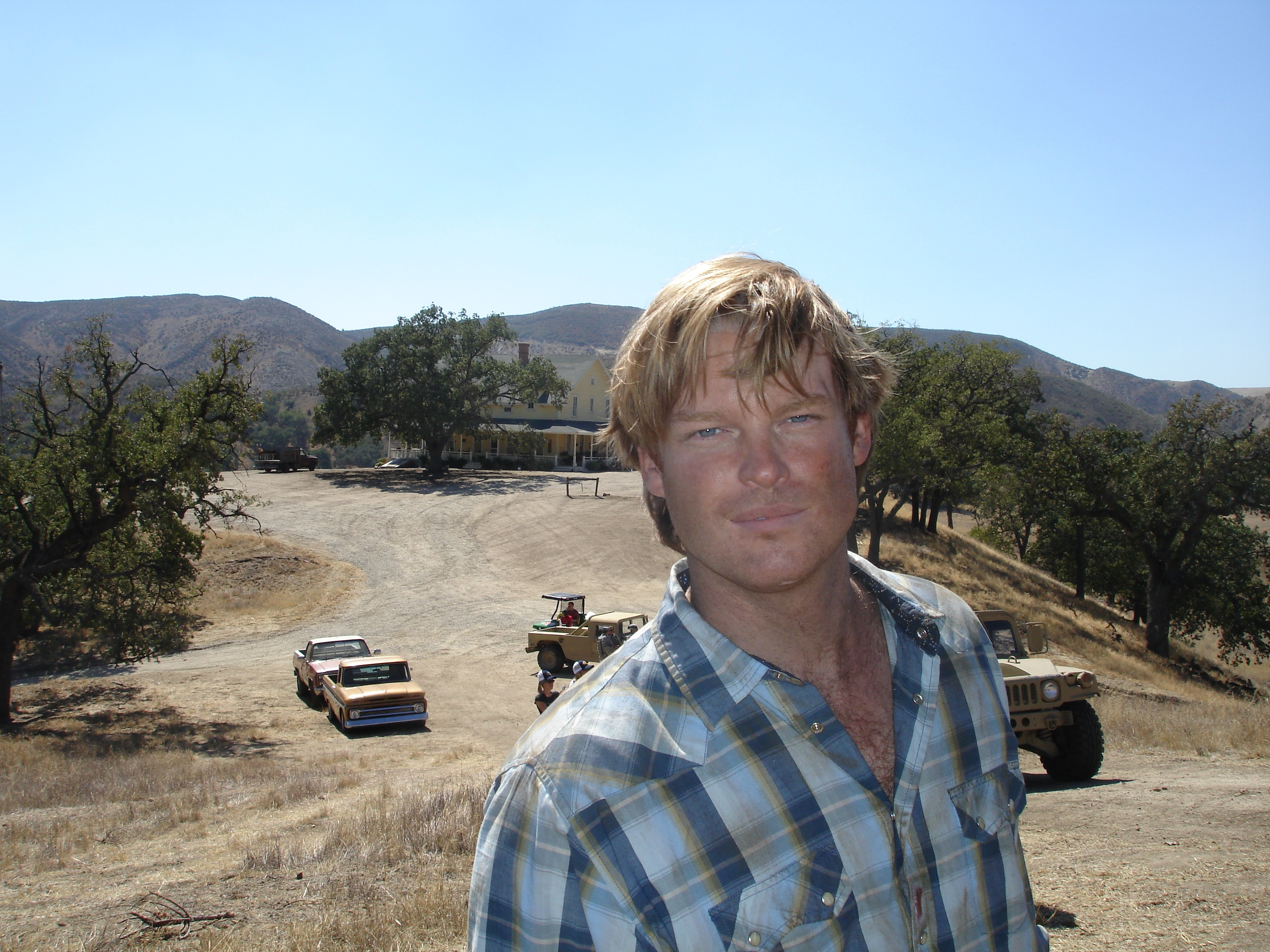
Brad Beyer, who plays Stanley Richmond, on the set of Jericho

Although Jericho is set in northwestern Kansas, most of the series was filmed on a studio backlot in Van Nuys, California. Some scenes were also filmed on the Warner Bros. Ranch Facilities (formerly the Columbia Ranch) in Burbank, California. The pilot and all episodes involving New Bern, Kansas, were filmed in Fillmore, California. Filming also occurred in Pasadena, California, including in front of the city hall, for scenes involving the Allied States capital of Cheyenne, Wyoming. The final episode to air included portions filmed at the Santa Anita race track. Some filming also took place in Canada and in Long Beach, California (specifically along Alamitos Bay). The commentary for some episodes on the Jericho Season 1 DVD includes the location of their filming.

=== First season ===
The first season of the show premiered Wednesday, September 20, 2006 and concluded with a cliffhanger episode on May 9, 2007. Lackluster ratings prompted concern, as the show hit a ratings low in early April. The ratings were down 25% when the series returned following the nearly three-month hiatus. During its first season, it ranked 48th, with an average of 9.5 million viewers in the United States. Other Wednesday night programs it competed with were Bones, Deal or No Deal, and ABC's comedy block.

Though the producers seemed confident that the program would be picked up for a second season, CBS officially announced Jericho's cancellation on May 16, 2007.

Several online communities, including the official Jericho forums, launched campaigns in an effort to revive the show. Fans also sent just over 20 tons of nuts to CBS headquarters; this referred to a scene from the season one finale "Why We Fight" where Jake Green repeats General Anthony McAuliffe's historic phrase "Nuts!" from the Battle of the Bulge. The peanuts and other proceeds from the donations were donated to charities, including the rebuilding effort in Greensburg, Kansas, a town that was largely destroyed by a tornado in 2007.

=== Second season ===
In a response posted on the Jericho forum, CBS president Nina Tassler acknowledged the fan response, stating, "We hope to develop a way to provide closure to ... the Jericho story." CBS officials acknowledge the campaign was the largest the network had seen using digital means to protest a show cancellation. President and CEO Leslie Moonves acknowledged that he was filtering emails from Jericho fans, while senior vice president of communications Chris Ender said, "You have to tip your hat to their ability to get attention and make some noise."

In June 2007, Jericho executive producer Carol Barbee announced that CBS was discussing the possibility of the show's return for an eight-episode mid-season run. A day later, Tassler posted an announcement on the forum stating that seven new episodes of Jericho had been commissioned as a midseason replacement for the 2007-2008 television season, with the possibility of an extension based on viewership. The last of these seven episodes was broadcast on March 25, 2008, and was not affected directly by the 2007 Writers Guild of America strike.

On August 2, 2007, a video was released on YouTube showing clips from the first day back at work for the Jericho cast and crew. It included a "thank you" from the cast and crew to the fans for their efforts to revive the show. Several months later, CBS released trailers announcing the second-season premiere, including Morse code spelling "SPREAD THE WORD".

Jericho returned for its second season on February 12, 2008 to mostly favorable reviews but with the lowest numbers the ratings had seen yet. In the early days of January 2008, the first three episodes of the second season leaked on the internet via a DVD screener source. The show's second season has also premiered in Canada on CTV, mirroring the US broadcast.

The first two episodes of the 2008 season received the lowest ratings to date for the series. Jericho's ratings did increase somewhat for its third episode, but dropped to fairly consistent but still low ratings. The second season averaged 6.2 million viewers.

On March 21, 2008, CBS announced that the network would not be renewing Jericho for a third season. CBS entertainment boss Nina Tassler stated that "The March 25 episode ... will be the series finale. Without question, there are passionate viewers watching this program; we simply wish there were more. We thank an engaged and spirited fan base for keeping the show alive this long, and an outstanding team of producers, cast and crew that went through creative hoops to deliver a compelling, high-quality second season. ... We're proud of everyone's efforts." According to SyFy's source, two endings were shot for the March 25 episode. One involved a cliffhanger leading into a third season, while the other would wrap up the series and provide closure for fans who had worked to secure the series' return. One unidentified source said, "There are a lot of people here who really care about what happens to Jericho, and I think we all wanted to see it succeed. Numbers are numbers, and [CBS] had to do what [CBS] had to do."

=== Post second season ===
In early 2008, executive producer Carol Barbee said talks were ongoing to find another home for Jericho, perhaps on a cable network, and raised the possibility of the Sci Fi Channel and broadcast networks such as The CW (co-owned by CBS). Other possibilities included a television or theatrical movie.

In April 2008, The New York Times website reported that CBS Paramount Network Television held talks with Comcast about finding a new home for Jericho. Possibilities included an arrangement whereby Comcast would pay part of the series' production expenses and then offer episodes in High-Definition before they air on CBS.

Jericho fans continued efforts to resurrect the series, including a one-page advertisement in the April 25, 2008 edition of Variety magazine. A second advertisement appeared in The Hollywood Reporter, as well as banner ads on the Variety and The Hollywood Reporter websites.

In January 2009, TV.com reported that a Jericho feature film is in development.

In April 2013, Jericho creator Stephen Chbosky stated during a chat with Nerdacy that talks about a live-action season 3 remain ongoing. In his statement, Chbosky noted, "you know William Morris Endeavor Agency, who represents me, executive producer Jon Turteltaub and many other people, and they've been talking to Netflix and you never know. I can't say what it will be in season 3, but I'm excited for the new developments."

In 2017, Skeet Ulrich confirmed than a third season was in development and then cancelled: “Karim Zreik, one of the producers, called me and said, “Netflix has a schedule, they have budget, they have locations. Are you in?” I said, “Absolutely, with one proviso: That first script back has to time-jump five years, and the world has devolved way lower than we could ever have imagined.” And they were on board with it. And CBS wouldn’t sell it. The deal wouldn’t work for them.“

==== Season 3 ====
In March 2009, Devil's Due Publishing announced that the story lines from the TV series would be continued in a comic book series. In November 2009, Devil's Due Publishing. As of May 2011, IDW Publishing re-released the first three comics as Jericho: Redux, as well as issues 4, 5 and 6, thus completing its publication. In August 2011, IDW collected all 6 comics into a 144-page graphic novel entitled Jericho Season 3: Civil War.

==== Season 4 ====
In April 2012, IDW announced a new series of Jericho comics, entitled Jericho Season 4, which picks up after the events of Jericho Season 3. The five-issue series, written by Kalinda Vazquez, with artwork by Andrew Currie and covers by Tim Bradstreet, was overseen by the original television series' writing staff.

== Episodes ==
Clips from the pilot episode became free to watch on Yahoo! TV several weeks before the episode actually aired on television. CBS is still showing most, but not all, of the Jericho episodes on their Innertube website as of January 2009, although they cannot be accessed from outside the U.S. CBS repeated the first three episodes on the Saturday nights following their original airings, as did Australia's Network Ten. All episodes from seasons 1 and 2 can be seen on Netflix.

Each episode's opening title sequence is accompanied by an audio message in Morse code. The messages vary from generic references to cryptic clues, and are always related to the current episode in some way. The messages were broadcast at 15 words per minute at a frequency of 1000 Hz. In addition to these messages, there is Morse code over the DVD menus. These messages say "Jericho Fans Made TV History." (Season 1) and "Thank You Fans For Making TV History" (Season 2). Also, in the second episode, Robert Hawkins received several additional Morse code messages through a ham radio that he was fixing.

== Reception ==
=== Ratings ===
Season	Episodes	Season premiere	Season finale	TV season	Viewers (millions)
1	22	September 20, 2006	May 9, 2007	2006–07	9.24
2	7	February 12, 2008	March 25, 2008	2007–08	6.16

Jericho : U.S. viewers per episode (millions)

Season	Episode number																						Average
Season	1	2	3	4	5	6	7	8	9	10	11	12	13	14	15	16	17	18	19	20	21	22	Average
1	11.66	11.47	10.83	10.86	10.88	10.56	9.87	9.68	9.34	9.74	10.25	8.30	8.31	8.10	7.76	8.52	8.00	8.19	7.66	7.56	8.03	7.72	9.24
2	7.09	5.86	6.90	5.67	5.84	5.73	6.02	–															6.16

Audience measurement performed by Nielsen Media Research

=== Critical reception ===
On Rotten Tomatoes, Season 1 has an approval rating of 58% based on reviews from 27 critics. The website's critical consensus states: "Jericho squanders the limitless potential of its apocalyptic premise by relying on tired tropes instead of forging a new path forward, leaving humanity with a retread rather than a reboot." Season 2 has an approval rating of 60% based on reviews from 10 critics. The website's critical consensus states: "Jericho improves in a redemptive second season that better explores the premise of humanity starting over, but the series still suffers from a thin approach to weighty material and conspiratorial plotting that strains credulity." On Metacritic, Season 1 has a score of 48 out of 100 while Season 2 holds a score of 72 out of 100.

== Home video ==
CBS DVD & Paramount Home Entertainment have released both seasons on DVD in Regions 1, 2 & 4.

On June 5, 2018, CBS re-released the complete series set on DVD in Region 1.

DVD name	Ep #	Release dates				Bonus features
DVD name	Ep #	Region 1	Region 2 (UK)	Region 2 (GER)	Region 4	Bonus features
The First Season	23	October 2, 2007	March 10, 2008	August 7, 2008	October 4, 2007	Featurette: Building Jericho; Featurette: What If? Commentary and Deleted scenes on select episodes.
The Second Season	7	June 17, 2008	September 29, 2008	June 18, 2009	July 10, 2008	Featurette: Rebuilding Jericho; Featurette: Nut Job; Commentary and Deleted scenes on select episodes. Unaired Season finale alternate ending
The Complete Series	30	June 17, 2008; June 5, 2018 (re-release)	August 30, 2010	October 15, 2009	N/A	Featurette: Tick Tick Boom; Featurette: Behind the Scenes "Thank You"; 100 Reasons to Watch Jericho; Table Read; Napalm Action Sequence (from Season 2); Train Action Sequence (from Season 2); Cast Members' Memorable Moments.

== Web-based tie-ins ==
Beyond Jericho was to be an online companion to the series. The television program gave the web address for the online companion. Beyond Jericho was to feature the "other survivors" of the nuclear attacks. According to Barbee, the story was intended to be unique to the site, but as the season of Jericho progressed, the online story would dovetail into the episodes themselves. Site and webisodes were removed from the CBS website before the second episode of the TV show was broadcast.

CBS instead released a new series of "prequel" webisodes named Countdown that take place before the first explosion. Each of these new webisodes appeared concurrently with the broadcast of new episodes during season 1, and showed Robert Hawkins gathering information before the attack.

=== Beyond Jericho ===
The first installment of Beyond Jericho began with an unknown man calling someone on a cell phone, requesting a ransom of $1.2 million for a woman he kidnapped. He then disappears underground through a metal trap door. While climbing down, he hears and feels a bang, but thinks nothing of it. After conversing with an associate about their next plans, he picks the woman up and climbs back up to the roof. When he opens the door, it's surrounded by rubble. The entire city around them has been destroyed. Shortly after, rubble falls through the trap door. With the cell phone (apparently actually the victim's cell phone) dead, and assuming that the man's associate is dead as well in the collapse, they start to climb through the rubble to find out what happened. Nearby, a hand with a surgical glove on emerges from the rubble, as the vignette ends.

=== Countdown ===
Starting on October 26, Beyond Jericho was replaced by Countdown, which documents Robert Hawkins' efforts to learn as much as possible about the effects of nuclear bombs before he moved to Jericho. The webisodes do not feature any of the regular characters, and consist primarily of Hawkins, draped in shadows, watching mini-documentaries.

The mini-documentaries feature expert interviews about the effects of a nuclear attack. They are only minimally connected to each episode's plot. For instance, CBS' 8-episode plot summary reads: "A shadowy military unit bursts into the chamber Hawkins has just vacated. On his computer, they find a video." The video was a short documentary about FEMA's response to Hurricane Katrina and their use of paramilitaries. The "shadowy military unit" then patiently waits until the documentary ends to resume its search for Hawkins.

Countdown's sponsor, AT&T, is heavily promoted in the series using product placement. Nearly all dialog takes place as SMS messages on an AT&T cellular phone, and a full-screen AT&T logo appears in every episode when Hawkins views the expert interviews. This web-based programming is not accessible from outside of the United States.

=== JenningsandRall.com ===
Created for the Tom Tooman game, JenningsandRall.com is the purported website of Jennings & Rall, the corporate giant which plays an increasingly prominent role in the second season of the series. The site contains a wealth of information about the company's post-September attacks global operations, with significant hints regarding events in the show.

On November 1, 2008, the domain name jenningsandrall.com expired.

=== Tom Tooman ===
Tom Tooman is an alternate reality game that CBS ran in conjunction with Jericho, beginning in August 2007. The game began with a cryptic letter posted on a website, supposedly from a Tom Tooman of Lame Deer, Montana. This letter was accompanied by a series of bar codes, some with decimal numbers and others with Mayan numbers. These numbers were used to create an IP address for a second website. More clues were released, as well as a blog on the CBS website connecting the game with Jericho. The game abruptly ended when the series was cancelled, with no closure offered. A synopsis of the game and the puzzles appear at TomTooman.com.

== See also ==
- Continuity of Operations Plan – the Continuity of Government plan for the U.S. government
- List of nuclear holocaust fiction
- Nuclear War Survival Skills – the official nuclear Civil Defense manual from United States Department of Defense
- Nuclear weapons in popular culture
- Survivalism
