= The Walking Dead (franchise) =

Media franchise about a zombie apocalypse

- Created by: Frank Darabont
- Owners: Skybound Entertainment; AMC Global Media (television)
- Years: 2010–present
- Based on: The Walking Dead by Robert Kirkman; Tony Moore; Charlie Adlard

Films and television
- Television series: The Walking Dead; Fear the Walking Dead; World Beyond; Tales of the Walking Dead; Dead City; Daryl Dixon; The Ones Who Live
- Web series: The Walking Dead webisodes; Fear the Walking Dead webisodes

Games
- Video games: The Telltale Series; Survival Instinct; Road to Survival; Overkill's TWD; Saints & Sinners; Onslaught; Survivors; All-Stars; Destinies

The Walking Dead is an American zombie apocalypse media franchise centered on a number of television series based on the comic book of the same name. Set in one fictional shared universe, the franchise has developed into seven live-action television series, eight web series that tie into the first two television series, novels, video games, and other media. The television series all air on AMC and AMC+.

The Walking Dead comic book was initially adapted into The Walking Dead television series (2010–2022). It was followed by the spin-off series Fear the Walking Dead (2015–2023), The Walking Dead: World Beyond (2020–2021), and the anthology series Tales of the Walking Dead (2022).

Following the conclusion of the original television series, three further spin-off series have been released featuring returning main characters: The Walking Dead: Dead City (2023–present), which focuses on Negan and Maggie; The Walking Dead: Daryl Dixon (2023–present), which focuses on Daryl and Carol; and The Walking Dead: The Ones Who Live (2024), which focuses on Rick and Michonne. Another series, titled More Tales from the Walking Dead Universe, is in development.

== Development ==
In January 2010, AMC ordered a pilot for The Walking Dead, based on the comic book of the same name and developed by Frank Darabont and Gale Anne Hurd. Andrew Lincoln was cast as Rick Grimes. The show premiered on October 31, 2010. The Walking Dead became known as AMC's flagship series and as a ratings juggernaut. Beginning with its third season, The Walking Dead attracted the most 18-to 49-year-old viewers of any cable or broadcast television series. The series was positively received by critics.

In September 2013, it was announced that Robert Kirkman, creator of the original comic book, Hurd, and Dave Alpert would create a companion spin-off television series featuring a new set of characters. The show was entitled Fear the Walking Dead. The series began as a prequel, but later shifted to run concurrently with the original series by adding Lennie James to the main cast of Fear the Walking Dead, reprising his role as Morgan Jones on The Walking Dead. James' appearance on Fear the Walking Dead was the first crossover within the franchise. The second crossover occurred when Austin Amelio reprised his role as the reformed Savior Dwight in the show's fifth season.

In July 2018, Scott M. Gimple announced a second spin-off series at San Diego Comic-Con. The show was later given a 10-episode order and the working title Monument. It was later retitled The Walking Dead: World Beyond and ran for two seasons. The second season featured the franchise's third crossover, with Pollyanna McIntosh reprising her role as Jadis from The Walking Dead.

In November 2018, Gimple announced that a trilogy of The Walking Dead films--revolving around the character of Rick, with Lincoln reprising his role--were in development by AMC Original Films. James expressed interest in joining the film, and McIntosh had teased her character Jadis as being in the film.

In September 2020, Gimple announced that an anthology series was in the works. The series was greenlit in October 2021 and was entitled Tales of the Walking Dead.

In 2022, multiple spinoffs were announced. One such spinoff was The Walking Dead: Dead City, a spinoff focusing on Maggie Greene and Negan that was originally entitled Isle of the Dead; Another was The Walking Dead: Daryl Dixon. This show was originally intended to be a spin-off about the titular character and Carol Peletier, but it shifted focus to Daryl due to logistical reasons involving Melissa McBride, who portrays Carol. Melissa McBride joined the series as a regular in its second season. Another spinoff announced in 2022 was The Walking Dead: The Ones Who Live, which was originally intended to be a trilogy of films announced in 2019 but was reworked into a miniseries. The Ones Who Live was originally entitled Rick & Michonne. In a November 2022 interview with AMC, Gimple said that more spinoffs were still to come.

The development of a series entitled More Tales from the Walking Dead Universe was announced in April 2023.

== Television series ==
Seven television series make up The Walking Dead franchise: The Walking Dead, Fear the Walking Dead, World Beyond, Tales of the Walking Dead, Dead City, Daryl Dixon, and The Ones Who Live. All series in total amount to 363 episodes across 29 seasons of television.

| Series | Season | Episodes | Originally released | | Showrunner(s) | Status |
| Series | Season | Episodes | First released | Last released | Showrunner(s) | Status |
|---|---|---|---|---|---|---|
| The Walking Dead | 1 | 6 | October 31, 2010 | December 5, 2010 | Frank Darabont | Concluded |
| The Walking Dead | 2 | 13 | October 16, 2011 | March 18, 2012 | Glen Mazzara | Concluded |
| The Walking Dead | 3 | 16 | October 14, 2012 | March 31, 2013 | Glen Mazzara | Concluded |
| The Walking Dead | 4 | 16 | October 13, 2013 | March 30, 2014 | Scott M. Gimple | Concluded |
| The Walking Dead | 5 | 16 | October 12, 2014 | March 29, 2015 | Scott M. Gimple | Concluded |
| The Walking Dead | 6 | 16 | October 11, 2015 | April 3, 2016 | Scott M. Gimple | Concluded |
| The Walking Dead | 7 | 16 | October 23, 2016 | April 2, 2017 | Scott M. Gimple | Concluded |
| The Walking Dead | 8 | 16 | October 22, 2017 | April 15, 2018 | Scott M. Gimple | Concluded |
| The Walking Dead | 9 | 16 | October 7, 2018 | March 31, 2019 | Angela Kang | Concluded |
| The Walking Dead | 10 | 22 | October 6, 2019 | April 4, 2021 | Angela Kang | Concluded |
| The Walking Dead | 11 | 24 | August 22, 2021 | November 20, 2022 | Angela Kang | Concluded |
| Fear the Walking Dead | 1 | 6 | August 23, 2015 | October 4, 2015 | Dave Erickson | Concluded |
| Fear the Walking Dead | 2 | 15 | April 10, 2016 | October 2, 2016 | Dave Erickson | Concluded |
| Fear the Walking Dead | 3 | 16 | June 4, 2017 | October 15, 2017 | Dave Erickson | Concluded |
| Fear the Walking Dead | 4 | 16 | April 15, 2018 | September 30, 2018 | Andrew Chambliss and Ian B. Goldberg | Concluded |
| Fear the Walking Dead | 5 | 16 | June 2, 2019 | September 29, 2019 | Andrew Chambliss and Ian B. Goldberg | Concluded |
| Fear the Walking Dead | 6 | 16 | October 11, 2020 | June 13, 2021 | Andrew Chambliss and Ian B. Goldberg | Concluded |
| Fear the Walking Dead | 7 | 16 | October 17, 2021 | June 5, 2022 | Andrew Chambliss and Ian B. Goldberg | Concluded |
| Fear the Walking Dead | 8 | 12 | May 14, 2023 | November 19, 2023 | Andrew Chambliss and Ian B. Goldberg | Concluded |
| World Beyond | 1 | 10 | October 4, 2020 | November 29, 2020 | Matthew Negrete | Concluded |
| World Beyond | 2 | 10 | October 3, 2021 | December 5, 2021 | Matthew Negrete | Concluded |
| Tales of the Walking Dead | 1 | 6 | August 14, 2022 | September 18, 2022 | Channing Powell | Concluded |
| Dead City | 1 | 6 | June 18, 2023 | July 23, 2023 | Eli Jorné | Released |
| Dead City | 2 | 8 | May 4, 2025 | June 22, 2025 | Eli Jorné | Released |
| Dead City | 3 | 8 | July 26, 2026 | September 13, 2026 | Seth Hoffman | Released |
| Daryl Dixon | 1 | 6 | September 10, 2023 | October 15, 2023 | David Zabel | Released |
| Daryl Dixon | 2 | 6 | September 29, 2024 | November 3, 2024 | David Zabel | Released |
| Daryl Dixon | 3 | 7 | September 7, 2025 | October 19, 2025 | David Zabel | Released |
| Daryl Dixon | 4 | 8 | February 2027 | TBA | David Zabel | Post-production |
| The Ones Who Live | 1 | 6 | February 25, 2024 | March 31, 2024 | Scott M. Gimple | Concluded |

=== The Walking Dead (2010–2022) ===
Sheriff's deputy Rick Grimes wakes up from a coma in a post-apocalyptic world where the undead, known as walkers, have taken over. Rick must fight for his survival to protect his family and friends. While the walkers are their number one threat, other humans also create conflict. With the collapse of modern civilization, these survivors must confront other survivors who have formed groups and communities with their own laws and morals, sometimes leading to open, hostile conflict between them.

=== Fear the Walking Dead (2015–2023) ===
Fear the Walking Dead is a companion series to The Walking Dead, developed by AMC. AMC started development of the series around September 2013 and committed to a two-season broadcast by March 2015. Fear the Walking Dead first premiered on August 23, 2015. The series ended on November 19, 2023 after the conclusion of the eighth and final season.

Fear the Walking Dead features a different set of characters, developed by Kirkman. The series starts at the onset of the zombie apocalypse and follows several people who escape Los Angeles as the military attempts to quarantine the city and seek refuge along the west coast of the United States and Mexico. The fourth season of Fear the Walking Dead features a crossover with The Walking Dead, specifically through the character Morgan Jones (played by Lennie James) who joins the cast of Fear the Walking Dead after the events of the eighth season of The Walking Dead. Similarly, Dwight, played by Austin Amelio, joined Fear the Walking Dead for its fifth season in 2019.

=== World Beyond (2020–2021) ===
In April 2019, AMC officially announced it had ordered a 10-episode limited series created by Scott M. Gimple and Matthew Negrete. The series focuses on the first generation of children that have grown up during the zombie apocalypse who call themselves "Endlings", and are aware of how to survive if confronted by zombies, but have otherwise been raised behind walls and have never actually experienced survival. Production began in July 2019 in Richmond, Virginia, with Jordan Vogt-Roberts originally attached to direct the pilot before Magnus Martens took over on account of a new series direction. The series stars Aliyah Royale, Alexa Mansour, Annet Mahendru, Nicolas Cantu, Hal Cumpston, Nico Tortorella and Julia Ormond. The series premiered on October 4, 2020, and ended on December 5, 2021, after two seasons.

=== Tales of the Walking Dead (2022) ===
In October 2021, AMC officially greenlit a six-episode series, which premiered on August 14, 2022, and ended on September 18, 2022. Channing Powell, who wrote for both The Walking Dead and Fear the Walking Dead, served as showrunner. It is an episodic anthology series that features new and existing characters within The Walking Dead universe.

=== Dead City (2023–present) ===
In March 2022, AMC officially greenlit Isle of the Dead, starring Cohan and Morgan as their characters Maggie and Negan, respectively. They are also executive producing with Eli Jorné, who is serving as showrunner. The series is set in Manhattan. In August 2022, the series was retitled as The Walking Dead: Dead City. The series premiered on June 18, 2023. In July 2023, it was renewed for a second season.

=== Daryl Dixon (2023–present) ===
A spinoff series created by Angela Kang and Scott M. Gimple to star Reedus and McBride as their characters Daryl and Carol, respectively, was also announced in September 2020, with plans to air in 2023 after the conclusion of the eleventh season of the main show. In April 2022, the project was retooled to be entirely Daryl-focused, and McBride departed the project. The series is set and was to be filmed in Europe in mid-2022, which would have made it logistically untenable for McBride. David Zabel serves as showrunner, who replaces Kang. In October 2022, the series' title was revealed to be Daryl Dixon. The series premiered on September 10, 2023. In July 2023, it was renewed for a second season, with McBride joining as a series regular. In July 2024, it was renewed for a third season.

=== The Ones Who Live (2024) ===
Following the departure of Andrew Lincoln (who portrayed the main character of Rick Grimes) during the ninth season of The Walking Dead, chief content officer Scott Gimple stated that three AMC original films would explore events related to Rick's character in the future. Lincoln was expected to star in the films, and the first was set to begin production in 2019. Besides Lincoln, Danai Gurira (Michonne) and Pollyanna McIntosh (Jadis / Anne) were also slated to star in the films. Gimple stated that the three films would not simply be extended episodes or attempts to adapt any of the comic books, but would instead heavily involve Kirkman in their development. The films were slated to be released in theaters by Universal Pictures.

At the 2022 San Diego Comic-Con, it was announced that the three films were being reworked into a six-episode miniseries starring Lincoln and Gurira. The series concluded Rick and Michonne's storyline following the main series' conclusion. It took place after the events of the fifth episode of the ninth season ("What Comes After") and the thirteenth episode of the tenth season ("What We Become"), and presents an "epic love story of two characters changed by a changed world." Filming began in January 2023. Gurira confirmed that she would be a writer on the series and would be credited as a co-creator alongside Gimple. The six-episode series premiered on February 25, 2024.

=== In development ===
The development of a series entitled More Tales from the Walking Dead Universe was announced in April 2023.

== Web series ==
| Series | Web series | Episodes | Originally released | Written by | Timeline |
|---|---|---|---|---|---|
| The Walking Dead | Torn Apart | 6 | October 3, 2011 | Story by : John Esposito & Greg Nicotero; Teleplay by : John Esposito | Set before the first season of The Walking Dead. |
| The Walking Dead | Cold Storage | 4 | October 1, 2012 | John Esposito | Set before the first season of The Walking Dead. |
| The Walking Dead | The Oath | 3 | October 1, 2013 | Story by : Greg Nicotero; Teleplay by : Luke Passmore | Set before the first season of The Walking Dead. |
| The Walking Dead | Red Machete | 6 | October 22, 2017 – April 9, 2018 | Nick Bernardone | Set during the entire apocalypse, mainly through and after seasons 4, 5, 7, and 8 of The Walking Dead. |
| Fear the Walking Dead | Flight 462 | 16 | October 4, 2015 – March 26, 2016 | Lauren Signorino and Michael Zunic | Set during the third episode of the first season of Fear the Walking Dead. |
| Fear the Walking Dead | Passage | 16 | October 17, 2016 – March 27, 2017 | Lauren Signorino and Michael Zunic | Set before the third season of Fear the Walking Dead. |
| Fear the Walking Dead | The Althea Tapes | 6 | July 27 – August 8, 2019 | Michael Alaimo and Jacob Pinion | Set before the fourth season and before the second half of the fifth season of Fear the Walking Dead. |
| Fear the Walking Dead | Dead in the Water | 6 | April 10, 2022 | Jacob Pinion | Set before the sixth season of Fear the Walking Dead. |

== Recurring cast and characters ==
List indicator

This section includes characters who will appear or have appeared in at least two series.

- A green cell indicates the actor is a main cast member.
- A red cell indicates the actor is a recurring cast member.
- A light blue cell indicates the actor is a guest or special guest cast member.

Cast and characters of The Walking Dead series
| Character | Cast member | Television series | | | | | | | Web series | |
| Character | Cast member | The Walking Dead | Fear the Walking Dead | World Beyond | Tales of the Walking Dead | Dead City | Daryl Dixon | The Ones Who Live | The Walking Dead | Fear the Walking Dead |
|---|---|---|---|---|---|---|---|---|---|---|
| Aiden | Breeda Wool | Guest | | | | | | Guest | | |
| Alex | Michelle Ang | | Main | | | | | | | Main (Note: Fear the Walking Dead: Flight 462) |
| Alpha | Samantha Morton | Main | | | Main | | | | | |
| Althea Szewczyk-Przygocki | Maggie Grace | | Main | | | | | | | Main (Note: Fear the Walking Dead: The Althea Tapes) |
| Anne (AKA Jadis Stokes) | Pollyanna McIntosh | Main | | Main | | | | Main | | |
| Bailey | King Bach | Guest | | | | | | Guest | | |
| Carol Peletier | Melissa McBride | Main | Guest | | | | Main | | | |
| Daryl Dixon | Norman Reedus | Main | | | | | Main | | | |
| Dwight | Austin Amelio | Main | Main | | | | | | | |
| Edwin Jenner | Noah Emmerich | Guest | | Guest | | | | | | |
| Gabriel Stokes | Seth Gilliam | Main | | | | | | Guest | | |
| Hershel Rhee | Logan Kim | Recurring | | | | Main | | | | |
| Jake Powell | Brendan Meyer | | Guest | | | | | | | Main |
| Jason Riley | Nick Stahl | | Recurring | | | | | | | Main (Note: Fear the Walking Dead: Dead in the Water) |
| Joe | Jeff Kober | Recurring | | | | | | | Main (Note: The Walking Dead: Red Machete) | |
| Judith Grimes | Cailey Fleming | Main | | | | | | Guest | | |
| Maggie Greene | Lauren Cohan | Main | | | | Main | | | | |
| Michonne | Danai Gurira | Main | | | | | | Main | | |
| Morgan Jones | Lennie James | Main | Main | | | | | | | |
| Negan | Jeffrey Dean Morgan | Main | | | | Main | | | | |
| Paul "Jesus" Rovia | Tom Payne | Main | Guest | | | | | | | |
| Rick Grimes | Andrew Lincoln | Main | Guest | | | | | Main | | |
| R.J. Grimes | Antony Azor | Recurring | | | | | | Guest | | |
| Sherry | Christine Evangelista | Recurring | Main | | | | | | | |
| Simon | Steven Ogg | Main | | | | Guest | | | | |
| Theodore "Teddy" Maddox | John Glover | | Recurring | | | | | | | Guest |

== Reception ==
=== Ratings ===
Viewership and ratings per season of The Walking Dead
| Series | Season | Timeslot (ET) | Episodes | First aired | | Last aired | | Avg. viewers (millions) |
| Series | Season | Timeslot (ET) | Episodes | Date | Viewers (millions) | Date | Viewers (millions) | Avg. viewers (millions) |
|---|---|---|---|---|---|---|---|---|
| The Walking Dead | 1 | Sunday 10:00 pm | 6 | October 31, 2010 | 5.35 | December 5, 2010 | 5.97 | 5.24 |
| The Walking Dead | 2 | Sunday 9:00 pm | 13 | October 16, 2011 | 7.26 | March 18, 2012 | 8.99 | 6.90 |
| The Walking Dead | 3 | Sunday 9:00 pm | 16 | October 14, 2012 | 10.87 | March 31, 2013 | 12.40 | 10.75 |
| The Walking Dead | 4 | Sunday 9:00 pm | 16 | October 13, 2013 | 16.11 | March 30, 2014 | 15.68 | 13.33 |
| The Walking Dead | 5 | Sunday 9:00 pm | 16 | October 12, 2014 | 17.30 | March 29, 2015 | 15.78 | 14.38 |
| The Walking Dead | 6 | Sunday 9:00 pm | 16 | October 11, 2015 | 14.63 | April 3, 2016 | 14.19 | 13.15 |
| The Walking Dead | 7 | Sunday 9:00 pm | 16 | October 23, 2016 | 17.03 | April 2, 2017 | 11.31 | 11.35 |
| The Walking Dead | 8 | Sunday 9:00 pm | 16 | October 22, 2017 | 11.44 | April 15, 2018 | 7.92 | 7.82 |
| The Walking Dead | 9 | Sunday 9:00 pm | 16 | October 7, 2018 | 6.08 | March 31, 2019 | 5.02 | 4.95 |
| The Walking Dead | 10 | Sunday 9:00 pm | 22 | October 6, 2019 | 4.00 | April 4, 2021 | 2.12 | 3.04 |
| The Walking Dead | 11 | Sunday 9:00 pm | 24 | August 22, 2021 | 2.22 | November 20, 2022 | 2.27 | 1.69 |
| Fear the Walking Dead | 1 | Sunday 9:00 pm | 6 | August 23, 2015 | 10.13 | October 4, 2015 | 6.86 | 7.61 |
| Fear the Walking Dead | 2 | Sunday 9:00 pm | 15 | April 10, 2016 | 6.67 | October 2, 2016 | 3.05 | 4.19 |
| Fear the Walking Dead | 3 | Sunday 9:00 pm | 16 | June 4, 2017 | 3.11 | October 15, 2017 | 2.23 | 2.36 |
| Fear the Walking Dead | 4 | Sunday 9:00 pm | 16 | April 15, 2018 | 4.09 | September 30, 2018 | 2.13 | 2.27 |
| Fear the Walking Dead | 5 | Sunday 9:00 pm | 16 | June 2, 2019 | 1.97 | September 29, 2019 | 1.51 | 1.51 |
| Fear the Walking Dead | 6 | Sunday 9:00 pm | 16 | October 11, 2020 | 1.59 | June 13, 2021 | 1.05 | 1.18 |
| Fear the Walking Dead | 7 | Sunday 9:00 pm | 16 | October 17, 2021 | 1.09 | June 5, 2022 | 0.71 | 0.82 |
| Fear the Walking Dead | 8 | Sunday 9:00 pm | 12 | May 14, 2023 | 0.56 | November 19, 2023 | 0.44 | 0.49 |
| World Beyond | 1 | Sunday 10:00 pm | 10 | October 4, 2020 | 1.595 | November 29, 2020 | 0.618 | 0.881 |
| World Beyond | 2 | Sunday 10:00 pm | 10 | October 3, 2021 | 0.753 | December 5, 2021 | 0.428 | 0.584 |
| Tales of the Walking Dead | 1 | Sunday 9:00 pm | 6 | August 14, 2022 | 0.572 | September 18, 2022 | 0.378 | 0.437 |
| Dead City | 1 | Sunday 9:00 pm | 6 | June 18, 2023 | 0.704 | July 23, 2023 | 0.618 | 0.685 |
| Dead City | 2 | Sunday 9:00 pm | 8 | May 4, 2025 | 0.378 | June 22, 2025 | 0.376 | TBD |
| Daryl Dixon | 1 | Sunday 9:00 pm | 6 | September 10, 2023 | 0.631 | October 15, 2023 | 0.688 | 0.647 |
| Daryl Dixon | 2 | Sunday 9:00 pm | 6 | September 29, 2024 | 0.576 | November 3, 2024 | 0.476 | TBD |
| Daryl Dixon | 3 | Sunday 9:00 pm | 7 | September 7, 2025 | 0.241 | October 19, 2025 | 0.251 | TBD |
| The Ones Who Live | 1 | Sunday 9:00 pm | 6 | February 25, 2024 | 0.896 | March 31, 2024 | 0.852 | 0.871 |

=== Critical response ===
Critical response of The Walking Dead franchise series
| Title | Season | Rotten Tomatoes | Metacritic |
|---|---|---|---|
| The Walking Dead | 1 | 87% (101 reviews) | 82 (25 reviews) |
| The Walking Dead | 2 | 80% (203 reviews) | 80 (22 reviews) |
| The Walking Dead | 3 | 88% (327 reviews) | 82 (19 reviews) |
| The Walking Dead | 4 | 81% (316 reviews) | 75 (16 reviews) |
| The Walking Dead | 5 | 90% (374 reviews) | 80 (11 reviews) |
| The Walking Dead | 6 | 76% (512 reviews) | 79 (10 reviews) |
| The Walking Dead | 7 | 66% (620 reviews) | —N/a |
| The Walking Dead | 8 | 65% (447 reviews) | —N/a |
| The Walking Dead | 9 | 89% (364 reviews) | 72 (4 reviews) |
| The Walking Dead | 10 | 77% (392 reviews) | —N/a |
| The Walking Dead | 11 | 80% (237 reviews) | —N/a |
| Fear the Walking Dead | 1 | 76% (206 reviews) | 66 (33 reviews) |
| Fear the Walking Dead | 2 | 70% (223 reviews) | 54 (12 reviews) |
| Fear the Walking Dead | 3 | 84% (110 reviews) | —N/a |
| Fear the Walking Dead | 4 | 80% (164 reviews) | —N/a |
| Fear the Walking Dead | 5 | 55% (211 reviews) | —N/a |
| Fear the Walking Dead | 6 | 89% (9 reviews) | —N/a |
| Fear the Walking Dead | 8 | 60% (5 reviews) | —N/a |
| World Beyond | 1 | 46% (24 reviews) | 48 (10 reviews) |
| Tales of the Walking Dead | 1 | 74% (29 reviews) | 61 (8 reviews) |
| Dead City | 1 | 80% (57 reviews) | 58 (10 reviews) |
| Dead City | 2 | 63% (8 reviews) | —N/a |
| Daryl Dixon | 1 | 70% (41 reviews) | 67 (16 reviews) |
| Daryl Dixon | 2 | 69% (13 reviews) | 62 (7 reviews) |
| Daryl Dixon | 3 | 80% (5 reviews) | 65 (4 reviews) |
| The Ones Who Live | 1 | 88% (54 reviews) | 61 (13 reviews) |

== Other media ==
=== Video games ===
- The Walking Dead: From Telltale Games, a series of games which are set within the comic book universe originally released between 2012 and 2019. The episodic graphic adventure games centre around the original characters of Clementine and Lee Everett, voiced by Melissa Hutchison and Dave Fennoy respectively. A spin-off game, The Walking Dead: Michonne, centering on the comic book character of the same name, was released in 2016.
- The Walking Dead: Assault: A tactics game developed by Gamagio. It was released on iOS in 2012 and Android in 2013, but is no longer available.
- The Walking Dead: Survival Instinct: A first-person shooter which serves as a prequel to the main television series, featuring the characters of Daryl Dixon and Merle Dixon. Norman Reedus and Michael Rooker reprise their roles to provide the character likeness and voices. The game was released on March 19, 2013, in North America.
- The Walking Dead: Our World: A location-based mobile game developed by Next Games.
- The Escapists: The Walking Dead: A spin-off from The Escapists, a strategy video game about escaping prisons.
- Overkill's The Walking Dead: A first-person shooter emphasizing cooperative gameplay, the game follows four characters in post-apocalyptic Washington, D.C. and features stealth, survival horror and role-playing elements. The game was released in November 2018 for PC, with scheduled console ports being cancelled shortly after.
- The Walking Dead: Saints & Sinners: A virtual reality game developed by Skybound Entertainment. It was released on January 23, 2020.
- The Walking Dead: Onslaught: A VR game for AMC's The Walking Dead.
- The Walking Dead: Last Mile: A live, interactive, online experience and game on Facebook Instant Gaming. It was released on August 22, 2022.
- The Walking Dead: Saints & Sinners – Chapter 2: Retribution: A sequel to The Walking Dead: Saints & Sinners which features a continuation of that game's story along with new mechanics and weapons. The game was released for Meta Quest 2 in December 2022 and for PlayStation VR, PlayStation VR2, and PC in early 2023.
- The Walking Dead: All-Stars: A mobile idle survival role-playing video game available both on Android and iOS. It was released globally on August 31, 2022. It features a vast array of characters and skills, as well as idle battle and collection systems. In this game, players must strategically recruit survivors and collect resources through a variety of story-driven modes and in-game events to build and evolve their own sanctuary while fighting against zombies to survive.
- The Walking Dead: Destinies: A third-person, narrative-driven action-adventure game in which the player can reshape the story of the first four seasons of the main series through their actions. Playing as a variety of characters, the player makes their way through locations from the show until they encounter certain key choice moments that can determine who lives and who dies, with those choices potentially differing from how things played out on the show. Developed by GameMill Entertainment for PC, PlayStation 4, PlayStation 5, Xbox Series X/S, and Nintendo Switch, the game was released on November 17, 2023.
- The Walking Dead: Streets of Survival: A retro-chic pixel art-styled beat 'em up game in the vein of Streets of Rage was announced on June 12, 2026, with slated releases for PC via Steam, PlayStation 5, Xbox Series X/S, Nintendo Switch, and Nintendo Switch 2 platforms. In advance of a full launch, a free demo immediately became available on Steam at the time of the game's announcement.

=== Role-playing game ===
- The Walking Dead Universe Roleplaying Game: The official tabletop role-playing game published by Free League Publishing. The rules are based on the Year Zero Engine.

=== Novels ===
Novels for The Walking Dead set within the comic book universe.

- Kirkman, Robert; Bonansinga, Jay (October 11, 2011). The Walking Dead: Rise of the Governor.
- Kirkman, Robert; Bonansinga, Jay (October 16, 2012). The Walking Dead: The Road to Woodbury.
- Kirkman, Robert; Bonansinga, Jay (December 4, 2012). A Walking Dead Short: Just Another Day at the Office.
- Kirkman, Robert; Bonansinga, Jay (October 8, 2013). The Walking Dead: The Fall of the Governor: Part One.
- Bonansinga, Jay (March 4, 2014). The Walking Dead: The Fall of the Governor: Part Two.
- Bonansinga, Jay (October 14, 2014). Robert Kirkman's The Walking Dead: Descent.
- Bonansinga, Jay (October 6, 2015). Robert Kirkman's The Walking Dead: Invasion.
- Bonansinga, Jay (October 18, 2016). Robert Kirkman's The Walking Dead: Search and Destroy.
- Bonansinga, Jay (October 17, 2017). Robert Kirkman's The Walking Dead: Return to Woodbury.
- Chu, Wesley (October 1, 2019). Robert Kirkman's The Walking Dead: Typhoon.

=== Miscellaneous ===
- McFarlane Toys manufactured action figures resembling the characters in the comic book for September 2011 release. In addition, action figures resembling characters from the TV series, including Rick Grimes, Daryl Dixon, and a dismemberable "walker", were set for release in November 2011.
- Taverncraft has produced The Walking Dead pint glasses and steins, and has a license to release lighters for the series as well.
- Titan Magazines has published The Walking Dead, The Official Magazine since October 2012.
- Two pinball tables based on the series were released: a physical table developed by Stern Pinball and a virtual one developed and published by Zen Studios, based on Telltale Games' The Walking Dead: Season One.

=== Attractions ===
- The Walking Dead: The Ride: Located in Thorpe Park, Thorpe, United Kingdom, The Ride is a re-design of a previously standing ride. Opened as The Walking Dead: The Ride in March 2018, as part of the "Year of The Walking Dead".
