= Kevin Blumenfeld =

American composer

Kevin Blumenfeld is an American composer best known for his ongoing work with director Charles Hood.

== Early life and career ==
Blumenfeld was raised in Los Angeles. After finishing high school, he studied film scoring, orchestration and electronic music at the Hamilton Academy of Music. Blumenfeld gained his first professional music experiences by working for Hans Zimmer as a music intern, taking on minor uncredited roles in the soundtracks of Pearl Harbor, Black Hawk Down, Matchstick Men and The Ring.

Blumenfeld’s first independent composing credit was on director Charles Hood’s debut feature Freezer Burn. Blumenfeld and Hood would form an ongoing relationship, with the former working on every one of the latter’s subsequent projects, including short films, his follow-up feature Night Owls, and his television series for Go90, In the Vault. Blumenfeld also served as composer on the Walking Dead webisodes series Cold Storage, The Oath and Torn Apart. Blumenfeld also worked extensively with director Adam Rifkin, scoring his films Shooting the Warwicks and Director’s Cut.

== Filmography ==
=== Film ===
Year	Title	Role	Notes
2016	Director's Cut	Composer	Director: [Adam Rifkin]
2015	Shooting The Warwicks	Composer	Director: [Adam Rifkin]
2015	Night Owls	Composer	Director: Charles Hood
2012	First Kiss	Composer	
2011	Final Sale	Composer	Director: Andrew C Erin
2011	Confined	Composer	Director: [Andrew C Erin]
2007	Simple Things	Composer	Director: Andrew C Erin
2007	Freezer Burn	Composer	Director: Charles Hood

=== Television ===
Year	Title	Role	Notes
2017	In the Vault	4 episodes	Director: [Charles Hood]
2017	Play By Play	8 episodes	Director: [Charles Hood]
2013	The Walking Dead: The Oath	3 episodes	Director: Greg Nicotero
2012	The Walking Dead: Cold Storage	4 episodes	Director: Greg Nicotero
2011	The Walking Dead: Torn Apart	6 episodes	Director: Greg Nicotero
