= The Walking Dead: Saints & Sinners =

2020 video game

- Developers: Skydance Interactive; Skybound Entertainment
- Publisher: Skydance Interactive
- Director: Adam Grantham
- Designers: Roy Orr; Cathy Trang
- Artist: Jake Geiger
- Writers: Davidson Cole; Ben Furhmann
- Composer: Michael David Peter
- Series: The Walking Dead
- Engine: Unreal Engine 4
- Platforms: Oculus Rift; Microsoft Windows; PlayStation VR; Oculus Quest; PICO 4; Meta Quest 3
- Release: Oculus Rift, PC; January 23, 2020; PlayStation VR; May 5, 2020; Oculus Quest; October 13, 2020; PICO 4 January 23, 2023
- Genres: First-person shooter Survival horror
- Mode: Single-player

The Walking Dead: Saints & Sinners is a virtual reality first-person shooter survival horror game for Windows, PlayStation 4, PlayStation 5, Oculus Quest, Oculus Quest 2, and Oculus Rift, developed by Skydance Interactive in partnership with Skybound Entertainment. It is based on the comic book series The Walking Dead by Robert Kirkman. Initially released on Steam and Oculus platform on January 23, 2020, it was released on PlayStation VR in May 2020. Additionally, the title was ported to Oculus Quest in October 2020, alongside PICO 4 in January 2023.

== Gameplay ==
Zombies, or "Walkers" can be killed by stabbing them through the skull and puncturing the brain, which the game refers to as "braining". The player is able to scale buildings to ambush enemies and attack from a distance with throwing weapons, bows, and close and long-range firearms. Physics-based combat control how melee weapons are controlled. There is a watch on the player's left wrist, notifying the player when "The Tower", a major faction, will ring the bells to "Stir the Herd". Once the bells are rung, a horde is spawned in and chases after the player.

There is a linear crafting system at the home base, where the player must scavenge different items and salvage them to make new items or weapons. Crafting recipes are unlocked by either upgrading crafting stations or finding them in safes or random drops. There is a random event in each location that an Exile will appear, who will either ask the player for supplies in exchange for materials, or hold the player at gunpoint demanding for supplies. There are three types of walkers, including: a default walker that is spawned naturally, a walker that spawns when a normal human is killed without damaging the brain and a special "infected" walker which, when stabbed using melee weapons, will reduce down the player's max health. Weapons can have different weights that affect how the weapon is held. Occasionally, there will be areas claimed by either "The Tower", or the "Reclaimed", the two major factions within the story.

An alternate game mode is available on all existing platforms, called The Trial. In the game mode the player must kill zombies to earn "bitecoins" which can be spent unlocking more supplies. "The Trial" can be played on three maps, with two difficulties. Hanging zombies can appear within the maps, and can be shot or stabbed for a double bonus boost, where shooting it gives a food which when eaten, gives the player infinite ammo and weapon durability, and using a melee weapon will get a food that, like the previous boost, gives them infinite weapon durability with infinite stamina.

A free DLC called "Aftershocks" released on September 23, 2021. It takes place after the main story of the game, and is designed to add new end-game content to the experience including new missions, story, and threats, while also hinting towards the villain of the game's sequel, retribution. The player is sent to retrieve caches from "The Tower" to bring back to their base.

== Plot ==
The game is set in the flooded New Orleans after an outbreak. The player takes the role of the Tourist, who is either male or female depending on the player's choice. At a campfire, Henri tells the player the legend of The Reserve, an old military bunker filled with supplies and weapons. Henri explains that there are two factions attempting to take control of New Orleans, "The Reclaimed" and "The Tower".

While in a boat, the Tourist gets swarmed by walkers hiding in the water and crashes onto a cemetery. After navigating through the cemetery, the Tourist finds Henri strung upside down and close to death. The player can either talk to him and find out what happened and then kill him or let him transform into a zombie. After Henri is dead, the player finds a broken down bus made into a survival shelter where Henri was doing his research on The Reserve. In the bus the player finds some food, old military codes, and a broken radio, which Henri was trying to repair. The player already has an automotive battery and an antenna, but is still in need of a microphone. The player must head out to the first location on the map to salvage the sought after item. After installing it, the player makes contact with Casey using the code "Waterfall" found in Henri's notes, who is trapped in the reserve due to flooding. The player agrees to help Casey get out of the Reserve in return of the valuable items inside it. Whilst talking to Casey, the conversation gets interrupted by a lantern lighting up on the graveyard. After further investigation by the player, a coffin is found where a mysterious person has been gathering intel from the Tower. After finding the intel and putting it in the coffin, the unknown person asks the player to meet them in front of the church courtyard. The unknown person is revealed to be May Benoit, who is a wanted traitor of The Tower. She asks the player to gather Tower intel for her in order to help her and her group of protégés. After getting all of the intel, May gives the player the Reserve key. (May can be killed to skip her entire story line and get the key immediately). Casey wants the player to find and install pumping systems to pump out the water in the Reserve. After finding the first two, Casey asks the player to travel to Rampart, a high school, to find Casey's friends who left the reserve in an attempt to fix the flooding issue. The player can optionally find the fate of the two other friends, but can finish the quest by only finding Kenneth, who is dying. After returning, the player travels to one of the locations (The Bastion) and meets JB, or Jéan-Baptiste, the leader of The Reclaimed. After a short conversation with him, JB gives the player the water pump and a code which he instructs the player to insert at the reserve in order to destroy it all. After leaving the building that JB is in, the player is stopped by Georgia, the second-in-command of The Tower and niece of Mama, the leader of The Tower, who tells the player to kill JB and they will forgive the player for all that happened. The player can either tell JB that The Tower is right outside the door and fight alongside him or kill JB in favor of the Tower. The player returns to the graveyard and installs the last pump which lights up the entire Reserve, revealing its location to all of New Orleans.

The player scrambles to hurry to the church to get to the Reserve, where a large battle breaks out. If the player chose to kill JB, The Tower will not attack the player. If not, The Tower will attack the player; however, the reclaimed will not attack the player. During the battle, the player sneaks into the church and finds the control room where they are informed by Casey that the piping has malfunctioned and that the player has to flood the armory to save him. The player can either flood the comms room, killing Casey and retrieving the loot from the armory, flood the armory where the weapons and supplies are stored, letting Casey live, or flood everything, using JB's code. If the player floods the Armory, Casey will come out in the church. If May is still alive by that point of the game, she is tugging on a rope of the church bell to send the horde after the factions that are fighting. The player can either choose to kill May, kill Casey and let May pull the bells and kill everyone, kill both of them, or let Casey kill her. After deciding, the player heads down into the Reserve, gathers whatever supplies are left from either the communication room or the armory, depending on which was flooded, and leaves on a boat.

== Reception ==
Reception

Aggregate score
Aggregator	Score
Metacritic	PC: 81/100; PS4: 79/100

Review scores
Publication	Score
Destructoid	7.5/10
IGN	9/10
Jeuxvideo.com	13/20
PlayStation Official Magazine – UK	8/10
PC Gamer (US)	88/100

The game received "generally favorable reviews" from critics according to review aggregator website Metacritic.

IGN enjoyed the story, and highlighted the morally grey choices the player had to make, "Saints & Sinners' ending depends entirely on the decisions you make throughout the campaign too, few of which are decidedly 'good' or 'evil". While criticizing the survival elements as chore-like, Destructoid praised the horror aspects of the title, feeling that it made the player consider every action, "Even an event as rote as walking through an abandoned house is fear-inducing, as you slowly grip each door handle with the assumption that a (well-animated) zombie could be staring you in the face". PC Gamer liked the way tension increased throughout Saints & Sinners, "With each day that passes, the available supplies in the world dwindle, while the number of zombies shuffling around increases. This means crafting new equipment is not simply a way to empower yourself, but imperative for keeping up with the ever-growing threat".

The Washington Post criticized the performance of the title, stating, "Playing the game on an i5-4690K computer with a second-generation Nvidia Titan X graphics card, I encountered plenty of frame-rate hiccups as well as audio glitches where the sound dropped in or out". UploadVR felt that the game felt incredibly immersive because of its overlapping systems, "The degree of control, mixed with the tactile interaction, really helps root you in its world in a way few other VR games have replicated". Road to VR liked the time limit present in most levels, writing "It's a clever, anxiety-ridden way of making you assess things quickly".

It was nominated for Best VR/AR at The Game Awards 2020, as well as Immersive Reality Game of the Year from the Academy of Interactive Arts & Sciences during the 24th Annual D.I.C.E. Awards.

== Sequel ==
A sequel, The Walking Dead: Saints & Sinners – Chapter 2: Retribution, was released for Meta Quest 2 on December 1, 2022, and for PlayStation VR and PlayStation VR2 in 2023.
