= Shooting the Warwicks =

- Directed by: Adam Rifkin
- Produced by: Adam Rifkin; Mike Plante
- Cinematography: Will Barratt
- Edited by: Rita K. Sanders
- Music by: Kevin Blumenfeld
- Distributed by: Vega, Baby!
- Release date: August 4, 2015
- Running time: 95 minutes
- Country: United States
- Language: English

Shooting the Warwicks is an American film directed by Adam Rifkin and adapted from his Showtime series Reality Show. It was released in August 2015. Both the film and the series star Adam Rifkin, Constantine Paraskevopoulos, Scott Anderson, Monika Tilling and Kelley Hensley. Also featuring Jude B. Lanston in the supporting role of Lt. Simmons.

== Plot ==
TV producer Mickey Wagner and his crew propose an idea to TV executive Ben; they wish to create a reality show, in which the family it centers on is kept unaware that they are being filmed, thus creating a show featuring genuine reactions. Choosing a target at random, Mickey's crew member Shane picks Dennis Warwick. Mickey calls Dennis, telling him that he and his family - made up of his wife Katherine, their teenage daughter Amy, and their dog Harry - have won a free trip. While they are away, the crew sets up hundreds of hidden cameras inside their house.

After the Warwicks return, Mickey's crew continues secretly filming them. An executive calls Mickey, telling him that need a sizzle reel before that evening in order to market the show. Mickey sends Shane into the house to steal Harry, causing the family to panic before he is returned to them by a crew member masquerading as a passerby. With the show greenlit, Mickey is able to secure several sponsorships, including one for peanut butter and another for condoms. Shane sneaks into the house and places the condoms in Dennis' bag but stops to feed Harry peanut butter, narrowly avoiding being caught by Amy before escaping. Harry licks Amy's face and, due to a deathly allergy, she begins to have a seizure due to the peanut butter with the crew watching and not doing anything until Amy's friend Stacy overhears the incident and calls an ambulance.

The Warwick parents fire their maid, thinking she supplied the peanut butter, and later Katherine finds the condoms but Dennis convinces her that they must be a coworkers; Katherine is evidently upset at her lack of a sex life. Mickey sets up an audition for the first woman to seduce Dennis, settling on a woman named Francesca; they additionally orchestrate the repeated sexual endeavors of Stacy and Amy's boyfriend Mike, before having Stacy catch them having sex. Emotionally vulnerable, she is introduced to a teenager named Yvonne (in actuality, a hired actor) whom she quickly befriends. When Dennis refuses Francesca's advances, Mickey hires a trainer named Chad to see if Katherine will cheat; to their joy, the two begin an affair.

Acting on Yvonne's negative influence, Amy fights with Stacy and is suspended, being grounded by her parents afterwards. She and Yvonne sneak out, where Yvonne takes her to a pornographer who convinces Amy to model nude along with Yvonne. The network tells Mickey that they have enough content and want him to orchestrate a happy ending; Mickey plans to steal Harry again, in order to bring the family together by finding him. Instead, Harry runs and Dennis, being distracted by an argument between Katherine and Amy in their car, accidentally runs over and brutally kills the dog.

With the family in disarray, Katherine admits to Dennis about her affair as she begins to have sex with Chad upstairs. Amy runs away from home to a party held by Yvonne where Mike arrives and shows everyone the nude images of Amy despite Yvonne's promise nobody would see them. Panicked, she drives away and, while angrily texting Yvonne, accidentally strikes and kills a pregnant woman crossing the street. Dennis contemplates suicide with a gun which is watched by the crew, with Mickey refusing to let anyone interfere as he doesn't believe Dennis will kill himself. Dennis receives a call that Amy has been arrested and when he goes to her cell, he discovers that Amy has hanged herself using her dress.

After returning home, a mentally unstable Dennis takes a fire poker and attacks Katherine and Chad while they're having sex. He brutally beat them both before telling Katherine that Amy is dead, then fatally shooting her. He knocks Chad down the stairs, who reveals that he's an actor and that everything has been filmed; he tells him about Mickey, and how he's watching Dennis from across the street in their van. Despite his pleas, Dennis shoots Chad in the head and, upon discovering the cameras, chases after the van in his car.

Eventually, Dennis causes the van to crash and holds Mickey at gunpoint; Mickey tells Dennis that he will be famous now, especially if Dennis lets him live. Dennis says that he doesn't care about fame and attempts to shoot Mickey, only to be shot dead by several arriving police officers. On-screen texts reveals that after 2 years, the show was eventually released and Mickey, who was arrested for trespassing, is making a reality series about his life in prison.
