= Night Owls (2015 film) =

2015 film directed by Charles Hood

- Theatrical release poster
- Directed by: Charles Hood
- Written by: Seth Goldsmith; Charles Hood
- Produced by: Seth Goldsmith; Charles Hood; Toby Louie
- Starring: Adam Pally; Rosa Salazar; Rob Huebel; Tony Hale; Peter Krause
- Cinematography: Adrian Peng Correia
- Edited by: Grant Surmi
- Music by: Kevin Blumenfeld
- Production companies: Haven Entertainment; Pan & Scan Pictures
- Distributed by: Orion Pictures
- Release date: March 13, 2015 (SXSW)
- Running time: 90 minutes
- Country: United States
- Language: English

Night Owls is an American romantic comedy drama film directed by Charles Hood that debuted on March 13, 2015 at the South by Southwest festival. It stars Adam Pally as workaholic Kevin who has a drunken one-night stand with the beautiful train-wreck Madeline, Rosa Salazar, whom he is horrified to realize is actually his boss' jilted ex-mistress. When she takes a bottle of sleeping pills, Kevin is forced to keep her awake all night, over the course of which the two begin to fall for each other.

== Plot ==
Kevin goes home with Madeline for a drunken one-night stand and is horrified to learn she is his boss's ex-mistress. After he catches her taking a box of sleeping pills, they slowly start to fall in love as he tries to keep her awake all night.

== Cast ==
- Adam Pally as Kevin
- Rosa Salazar as Madeline
- Rob Huebel as Peter
- Tony Hale as Dr. Newman
- Peter Krause as Will Campbell

== Production ==
Filming for Night Owls took place over a 17-day stretch in March 2014. Almost all of the movie was shot according to plan with the exception of the pool scene. The weather had been very cold and the pool had no heating so the scene needed to be reworked. Director Charles Hood said in an interview with RogerEbert.com: "There's the scene in the movie where they hug in the hallway and he gets an erection. In the script, that was supposed to be happening in the pool. But we never could get the pool to be heated and we were shooting in March and it was freezing cold. Our AD told us that the actors were only allowed to be in the water for ten minutes at a time. Each time they went in the water for ten minutes, they would have to go inside and warm up for half an hour... Those are the actual rules so they don't get hypothermia. The pool scene was looming for a week.... I was living at the house during the shoot and so were Adam and Rosa. So, Adam, Rosa, [co-writer] Seth and I went into Adam's room, and the four of us talked it out. We came up with: What if they jumped in the pool and then immediately ran inside to get warm and then have that scene in the hallway. Seth and I had to run off and write it. But doing the scene in the hallway ended up working out way better. Because I think the scene in the pool would have been kind of a cliche. We've seen it before. But to have them jump in and out of the pool is so much more fun."

== Casting ==
The director originally had Adam Pally in mind for the role of Kevin and Hood's agent sent him the script. Pally was drawn to the film with the excitement of new challenges: "I really wanted the chance to play a romantic lead. In my brief career I’ve been playing a lot of best friends and goofballs and comedic sidekicks. I know I can do that, so I wanted to give this a shot. So, it was very fulfilling on that level." Pally then suggested Rosa Salazar for the part of Madeline.

The director had this say about how the initial casting went: "I know this sounds funny, but it really was one of those things that magically came to fruition. My agent knew Adam Pally, who was on our wish list for the role of Kevin. She sent him the script, and within days he came on board. He then suggested Rosa [with whom he worked on the film Search Party] and a similar thing happened. It really worked out – I think Adam’s comedic flair brought the best out of Rosa’s more dramatic background."

Krause and Hale were not confirmed until the filming had already started. According to the director: "At the start of production, we had still not cast the roles of Dr Newman [Hale] or Will [Krause]. Miraculously in the first [out of three] weeks, we saw a film poster with Tony Hale and we immediately thought, ‘Perfect!’ One of the film’s financiers, Haven Entertainment made a phone call and he was in. Peter Krause was more difficult but that was more because of an error on our part. Rosa knew him from [the TV series] Parenthood and sent him an email. When he didn’t get back, we gave up on the idea and started looking for someone else. She realised she had his wrong email. Once that was sorted, we were pleasantly surprised how enthusiastic he was about the project and subsequently how easy-going he was to work with."

== Reception ==
On Rotten Tomatoes, the film has a rating of 100% based on 14 reviews, and an average rating of 7.9/10. On Metacritic it has a score of 73% based on reviews from 5 critics, indicating "generally favorable reviews".
