= The Walking Dead (TV series) =

American post-apocalyptic drama television series (2010–2022)

- Genre: Horror; Drama; Zombie apocalypse; Southern Gothic; Neo-Western
- Based on: The Walking Dead by: Robert Kirkman; Tony Moore; Charlie Adlard
- Developed by: Frank Darabont
- Showrunners: Frank Darabont (season 1); Glen Mazzara (seasons 2–3); Scott M. Gimple (seasons 4–8); Angela Kang (seasons 9–11)
- Starring: Andrew Lincoln; Jon Bernthal; Sarah Wayne Callies; Laurie Holden; Jeffrey DeMunn; Steven Yeun; Chandler Riggs; Norman Reedus; Lauren Cohan; Danai Gurira; Michael Rooker; David Morrissey; Melissa McBride; Scott Wilson; Michael Cudlitz; Emily Kinney; Chad L. Coleman; Lennie James; Sonequa Martin-Green; Jeffrey Dean Morgan; Alanna Masterson; Josh McDermitt; Christian Serratos; Seth Gilliam; Ross Marquand; Katelyn Nacon; Tom Payne; Khary Payton; Samantha Morton; Ryan Hurst; Cooper Andrews; Callan McAuliffe; Eleanor Matsuura; Lauren Ridloff; Cailey Fleming; Nadia Hilker; Cassady McClincy; Angel Theory; Paola Lázaro; Michael James Shaw; Josh Hamilton; Laila Robins
- Music by: Bear McCreary; Sam Ewing
- Country of origin: United States
- Original language: English
- No. of seasons: 11
- No. of episodes: 177 (list of episodes)

Production
- Executive producers: Frank Darabont; Gale Anne Hurd; David Alpert; Robert Kirkman; Charles H. Eglee; Glen Mazzara; Scott M. Gimple; Greg Nicotero; Tom Luse; Denise Huth; Angela Kang; Joseph Incaprera
- Producers: Jolly Dale; Caleb Womble; Paul Gadd; Heather Bellson
- Cinematography: Rohn Schmidt; David Boyd; Michael E. Satrazemis; Stephen Campbell; Paul Varrier; Duane Charles Manwiller; Jalaludin Trautmann; Scott Kevan; David Tattersall
- Editors: Julius Ramsay; Hunter M. Via; Avi Youabian; Dan Liu; Nathan D. Gunn; Rachel Goodlett Katz; Kelley Dixon; Evan Schrodek; Alan Cody; Tiffany Melvin; Jack Colwell; Geofrey Hildrew
- Running time: 41–67 minutes
- Production companies: Idiot Box Productions; Circle of Confusion; Skybound Entertainment; Valhalla Entertainment; AMC Studios

Original release
- Network: AMC
- Release: October 31, 2010 – November 20, 2022

Related
- The Walking Dead (franchise); Talking Dead

The Walking Dead (TWD) is an American post-apocalyptic horror drama television series developed by Frank Darabont, based on the comic book series of the same name by Robert Kirkman, Tony Moore, and Charlie Adlard. Together, the show and the comic book series form the core of The Walking Dead franchise. The series features a large ensemble cast as survivors of a zombie apocalypse trying to stay alive under near-constant threat of attacks from zombies known as "walkers". With the collapse of modern civilization, these survivors must confront other human survivors who have formed groups and communities with their own sets of laws and morals, sometimes leading to open conflict between them. The series is the first television series within The Walking Dead franchise.

The Walking Dead premiered on October 31, 2010. It was exclusively broadcast on cable channel AMC in the United States and internationally through the Fox Networks Group and Disney+. The series concluded on November 20, 2022, after eleven seasons and 177 episodes. Andrew Lincoln played the lead character of Rick Grimes until his departure from the show in the ninth season. Other long-standing cast members included Norman Reedus, Steven Yeun, Chandler Riggs, Melissa McBride, Lauren Cohan, Danai Gurira, Josh McDermitt, Christian Serratos, Seth Gilliam, Ross Marquand and Jeffrey Dean Morgan. The Walking Dead was produced by AMC Studios in the state of Georgia, with most filming having taken place in the outdoor spaces of Riverwood Studios near Senoia, Georgia.

The Walking Dead became known as AMC's flagship series and as a ratings juggernaut. Beginning with its third season, The Walking Dead attracted the most 18- to 49-year-old viewers of any cable or broadcast television series. The series was positively received by critics. It was nominated for several awards, including the Golden Globe Award for Best Television Series – Drama and the Writers Guild of America Award for New Series. The show's viewership declined during later seasons.

AMC has created a franchise of related media, including the spin-off series Fear the Walking Dead (2015–23), The Walking Dead: World Beyond (2020–21), Tales of the Walking Dead (2022), The Walking Dead: Dead City (2023–present), The Walking Dead: Daryl Dixon (2023–present) and The Walking Dead: The Ones Who Live (2024) as well as several webisodes and video games.

== Series overview ==
The Walking Dead takes place after the onset of a worldwide zombie apocalypse. The zombies, referred to as "walkers", shamble towards living humans and other creatures to eat them. They are attracted to noise and scents, including the scent of humans. Humans who are bitten or scratched by walkers die and become walkers themselves. Early in the series, it is suggested that, because any human who dies will reanimate as a walker regardless of cause of death, all living humans carry a pathogen responsible for the mutation that turns humans into walkers; however, no pathogen is ever confirmed. The mutation is activated after the death of the host. The only way to permanently kill a walker is to damage its brain or to destroy the body entirely (e.g. via cremation).

Initially, the series centers on sheriff's deputy Rick Grimes, who wakes up from a coma in the first episode of the series. While Rick was comatose, the world fell to walkers, collapsing society and leaving the survivors to fend for themselves. Rick becomes the leader of a group of survivors from the Atlanta, Georgia region, who attempt to sustain and protect themselves against attacks by walkers and against other groups of survivors willing to use any means necessary to stay alive.

Season	Episodes	Originally released	
Season	Episodes	First released	Last released
1	6	October 31, 2010	December 5, 2010
2	13	October 16, 2011	March 18, 2012
3	16	October 14, 2012	March 31, 2013
4	16	October 13, 2013	March 30, 2014
5	16	October 12, 2014	March 29, 2015
6	16	October 11, 2015	April 3, 2016
7	16	October 23, 2016	April 2, 2017
8	16	October 22, 2017	April 15, 2018
9	16	October 7, 2018	March 31, 2019
10	22	October 6, 2019	April 4, 2021
11	24	August 22, 2021	November 20, 2022

=== Season 1 (2010) ===
When sheriff's deputy Rick Grimes of King County, Georgia, wakes from a coma, he discovers the world has been overrun by zombies ("walkers"). Rick befriends Morgan Jones and travels alone to Atlanta before finding his wife Lori, son Carl, and his police partner and best friend Shane Walsh in the woods with other survivors. After being attacked by walkers at night, the group travels back to Atlanta to the Centers for Disease Control headquarters, but learn from the sole remaining scientist that no cure exists for the pandemic.

=== Season 2 (2011–12) ===
Rick's group, searching for Carol's missing daughter, Sophia, takes shelter at a farm run by Hershel Greene. Tensions with Hershel's family worsen after it is discovered that he has a barn full of walkers: former friends and family members (including Sophia). Rick learns that Shane and Lori were romantically involved while he was in a coma, and that Lori is pregnant. Shane and Rick's friendship deteriorates, until Rick is forced to kill Shane in self-defense. The commotion attracts walkers to the farm, forcing Rick's group and Hershel's family to evacuate.

=== Season 3 (2012–13) ===
Eight months after fleeing the farm, Rick's group, sans Andrea, sets up a new home at a prison near Newnan. Lori dies from an emergency C section, and Rick starts to become unhinged and hallucinate. Meanwhile, Andrea was rescued by Michonne, and the two discover Woodbury, a fortified town led by a deceitful man, "the Governor", who seeks to destroy the group at the prison. Conflict erupts between the two groups leading to the fall of Woodbury, but the Governor kills Andrea and escapes. The remaining citizens of Woodbury move into the prison.

=== Season 4 (2013–14) ===
Several months after the Governor's attack, a deadly flu kills many of the people at the prison. The Governor finds Martinez, his former right-hand man, and kills him, taking over his group before leading them into the prison. Rick's group is forced to separate and flee, while Hershel and the Governor are killed. The scattered survivors try to find each other and make new acquaintances. They all find numerous signs pointing to a safe haven called Terminus in Atlanta. They reunite at Terminus, but Rick's group, sans Carol, is captured for an unknown purpose.

=== Season 5 (2014–15) ===
The residents of Terminus are revealed to have become cannibals; Carol leads a charge to rescue Rick's group. After a conflict with the former Atlanta Police Department at Grady Memorial Hospital, the group leaves Georgia and migrates to Virginia, where a stranger named Aaron invites them to join the fortified community of Alexandria, led by Deanna Monroe. They quickly learn Alexandria's residents are ill-prepared for survival. Rick becomes attracted to Jessie Anderson and discovers she has an abusive husband. Deanna orders Rick to execute the man after he kills her husband, as Morgan arrives unexpectedly.

=== Season 6 (2015–16) ===
Deanna gives Rick command of Alexandria to protect the community. Hostile raiders called the Wolves use a walker horde to attack Alexandria, killing numerous people, including Deanna and the Anderson family. While recovering, Alexandria learns of a community called the Hilltop. Paul "Jesus" Rovia invites them to trade supplies with Hilltop if they can help end the threat of the extortionist Saviors, led by a man named Negan. Although Rick's group decimates a Savior outpost, they are caught by Negan and forced to submit to him.

=== Season 7 (2016–17) ===
Negan brutally murders Abraham and Glenn, initiating his rule over Alexandria. His actions initially lead Rick to submit, but Michonne persuades him to fight back. They encounter a community called the Scavengers and ask them for help. Carol and Morgan befriend King Ezekiel, the leader of the Kingdom, while Maggie and Sasha rally the Hilltop. Rosita and Eugene make a bullet to kill Negan. When the bullet is blocked by Lucille, Negan's baseball bat, Negan forcefully recruits Eugene as a Savior. The Saviors and turncoat Scavengers attack Alexandria, but are repelled by Sasha's sacrifice and the aid of Kingdom and Hilltop soldiers.

=== Season 8 (2017–18) ===
Rick, Maggie, and Ezekiel rally their communities into war against Negan and the Saviors. Losses are heavy on both sides and many of the Kingdom's soldiers are killed. Alexandria falls to a Savior attack, and Carl is bitten by a walker; before euthanizing himself, Carl convinces Rick to end the war peacefully and restart society anew. Negan attempts to wipe out Rick and his allies in a final battle, but Eugene thwarts his plan by sabotaging the Saviors' bullets. Rick wounds Negan, but against Maggie's wishes, spares and imprisons Negan, ending the war.

=== Season 9 (2018–19) ===
Eighteen months after Negan's downfall, Rick proposes building a bridge to facilitate trading, but this creates resentment. Rick is seemingly killed when he destroys the bridge to prevent an invasion of walkers. Six years later, his absence has caused estrangement between the communities. A new walker-controlling threat, the Whisperers, demands the survivors do not trespass in their territory; their leader, Alpha, has acquired a large horde of walkers that she will unleash if they do so. After her daughter Lydia abandons her mother's group for the Kingdom's, Alpha disowns her and massacres many residents during a fair.

=== Season 10 (2019–21) ===
Alpha begins breaking down the communities with seemingly random walker attacks and acts of sabotage. Under Carol's orders, Negan infiltrates the Whisperers and assassinates Alpha. Her right-hand man Beta takes command of the Whisperers, but he and the horde are defeated by the survivors. Eugene leads a group to West Virginia to meet a new group of survivors, but they are captured by soldiers. Meanwhile, Michonne travels north to search for Rick after finding evidence he survived his apparent death.

=== Season 11 (2021–22) ===
Eugene's group convinces their captors—the Commonwealth, a prosperous class-based community in Ohio—to aid the struggling Virginian communities. The autocratic governor, Pamela Milton, becomes hostile toward the communities after her corruption is exposed and her son Sebastian is killed. When Pamela tries to sacrifice the lower-classes to a horde containing more intelligent walker variants, the communities lead a revolution against her. In the aftermath, Rosita dies of a bite, Negan is accepted by Maggie as an ally, and Ezekiel takes over as governor to reform the Commonwealth. As the communities rebuild, Daryl sets off to find Rick.

== Cast and characters ==
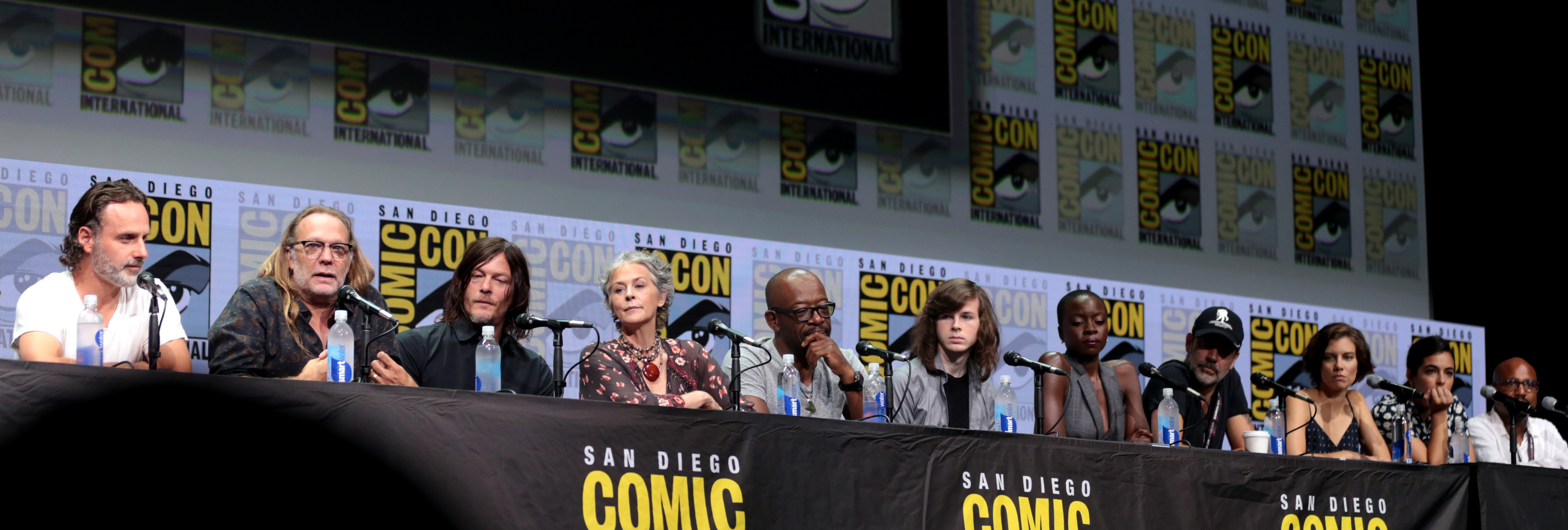
From left to right: Andrew Lincoln (Rick), Greg Nicotero (director/executive producer), Norman Reedus (Daryl), Melissa McBride (Carol), Lennie James (Morgan), Chandler Riggs (Carl), Danai Gurira (Michonne), Jeffrey Dean Morgan (Negan), Lauren Cohan (Maggie), Alanna Masterson (Tara), and Seth Gilliam (Gabriel) on a panel for the series at San Diego Comic-Con in July 2017

The list below contains those that have been credited within the series' title sequence and those who are credited as "also starring". Recurring and guest stars are listed on the individual season articles.

- Andrew Lincoln as Rick Grimes: The series' protagonist and a former sheriff's deputy, Rick is the leader of a group of survivors who becomes the leader of the Alexandria Safe-Zone. (seasons 1–9; special guest star season 11)
- Jon Bernthal as Shane: Rick's former police partner and best friend. In the second season, he forms an intense rivalry with Rick. (seasons 1–2; special guest star seasons 3, 9)
- Sarah Wayne Callies as Lori Grimes: Rick's wife, who had an affair with Shane when she believed Rick was dead. (seasons 1–3)
- Laurie Holden as Andrea: A former civil rights attorney and member of the original Atlanta group of survivors, and Amy's older sister. (seasons 1–3)
- Jeffrey DeMunn as Dale: An older member of the group who owned the RV in which a group of survivors traveled. Often the voice of reason within the group. (seasons 1–2)
- Steven Yeun as Glenn Rhee: A former pizza delivery boy who saved Rick's life. Glenn begins a relationship with Maggie Greene and later marries her. Over the course of the series, Glenn becomes an integral member of the group known for his character and resourcefulness. (seasons 1–7)
- Chandler Riggs as Carl Grimes: Rick and Lori's young son. Carl is forced to mature and learn to survive in the deadly new post-apocalyptic world. (seasons 1–8)
- Norman Reedus as Daryl Dixon: The group's primary hunter, Daryl becomes a key member of the group and Rick's trusted lieutenant. (seasons 2–11; recurring season 1)
- Melissa McBride as Carol Peletier: Originally a meek housewife, Carol overcomes domestic abuse to become a skilled, resourceful fighter capable of making difficult decisions. (seasons 2–11; recurring season 1)
- Lauren Cohan as Maggie Greene: The eldest daughter of the Greene family, Maggie marries Glenn, becomes pregnant with their child and becomes the leader of the Hilltop Colony. (seasons 3–11; recurring season 2)
- Danai Gurira as Michonne: A fierce, katana-wielding woman who joins Rick's group. Michonne eventually becomes Rick's romantic partner and a mother-figure to his son, Carl. She is also the mother-figure to Judith, Carl's younger sister, and later the biological mother of Rick's second son, R.J. (seasons 3–10; special guest star season 11)
- Scott Wilson as Hershel Greene: A veterinarian and farmer who maintains his faith and acts as the group's primary moral compass. Hershel is the father of Maggie and Beth Greene. (seasons 3–4; special guest star season 9; recurring season 2)
- Michael Rooker as Merle Dixon: The racist and volatile older brother of Daryl Dixon. In the third season, he is the right-hand man to the Governor. (season 3; guest seasons 1–2)
- David Morrissey as Philip "The Governor" Blake: The antagonistic leader of the town of Woodbury, the Governor is ruthless, paranoid, and dangerous. (seasons 3–4; special guest star season 5)
- Emily Kinney as Beth Greene: A soft-spoken teenage girl who enjoys singing, Beth is Hershel's younger daughter and Maggie's younger half-sister. (seasons 4–5; recurring seasons 2–3)
- Chad L. Coleman as Tyreese: Tough and compassionate, Tyreese places an emphasis on moral reasoning. He struggles to cope with the immoral nature of some of the group's survival tactics and finds it difficult to kill in defense of the group. (seasons 4–5; recurring season 3)
- Sonequa Martin-Green as Sasha: Tyreese's fiery younger sister and a former firefighter, Sasha is the group's sharpshooter. After several personal losses, she suffers from PTSD. (seasons 4–7; special guest star season 9; recurring season 3)
- Lawrence Gilliard Jr. as Bob Stookey: A former army medic and recovering alcoholic who develops a close relationship with Sasha. (seasons 4–5)
- Michael Cudlitz as Abraham Ford: A former military sergeant on a mission to bring Eugene to Washington, D.C. to find a cure for the walker virus. (seasons 5–7; recurring season 4)
- Josh McDermitt as Eugene Porter: A man who claims to know a cure for the walker virus, Eugene is cowardly and inefficient when dealing with walkers, but is very intelligent. (seasons 5–11; recurring season 4)
- Christian Serratos as Rosita Espinosa: A tough, focused, and very capable survivor, and also Abraham's girlfriend. (seasons 5–11; recurring season 4)
- Alanna Masterson as Tara Chambler: A former police academy student and lesbian. Tara joins Rick's group after having initially been affiliated with the Governor. She serves as a primary supply runner. (seasons 5–9; recurring season 4)
- Andrew J. West as Gareth: The cannibalistic leader of Terminus who captures and coerces Rick's group into submission before being executed by Rick. (season 5; guest season 4)
- Seth Gilliam as Gabriel Stokes: A priest who joins Rick's group. He lacks experience with walkers and struggles with his faith in the new world. (seasons 5–11)
- Lennie James as Morgan Jones: The first survivor Rick encounters in the first season. After suffering a psychological breakdown, he comes to peace with the world around him. (seasons 6–8; recurring season 5; special guest star season 3; guest season 1)
- Alexandra Breckenridge as Jessie Anderson: An Alexandria resident who develops a relationship with Rick. (season 6; recurring season 5)
- Ross Marquand as Aaron: A recruiter who invites Rick's group to Alexandria. (seasons 6–11; recurring season 5)
- Austin Nichols as Spencer Monroe: Deanna's son and a guard of Alexandria. (seasons 6–7; recurring season 5)
- Tovah Feldshuh as Deanna Monroe: A former Congresswoman and original leader of Alexandria. (season 6; recurring season 5)
- Jeffrey Dean Morgan as Negan: The totalitarian, sociopathic leader of the Saviors. (seasons 7–11; special guest star season 6)
- Austin Amelio as Dwight: A ruthless and reluctant member of the Saviors who forms an intense rivalry with Daryl. (seasons 7–8; recurring season 6)
- Tom Payne as Paul "Jesus" Rovia: A scout and member of the Hilltop Colony. (seasons 7–9; recurring season 6)
- Xander Berkeley as Gregory: The selfish and treacherous leader of the Hilltop Colony. (seasons 7–9; guest season 6)
- Khary Payton as Ezekiel: The "king" of a community known as the Kingdom, Ezekiel is a former zookeeper with a pet Bengal tiger called Shiva. (seasons 8–11; recurring season 7)
- Steven Ogg as Simon: A high-ranking member of the Saviors serving as Negan's right-hand man. (season 8; recurring season 7; guest season 6)
- Katelyn Nacon as Enid: An isolated teenager in Alexandria who forms a close bond with Carl. (seasons 8–9; recurring seasons 6–7; guest season 5)
- Pollyanna McIntosh as "Jadis" / Anne: The impassive, enigmatic leader of the Scavengers. (seasons 8–9; recurring season 7)
- Callan McAuliffe as Alden: A former member of the Saviors who later switches his allegiance to the Hilltop. (seasons 9–11; recurring season 8)
- Avi Nash as Siddiq: A former vagabond and doctor who is rescued by Carl and brought to Alexandria. (seasons 9–10; recurring season 8)
- Samantha Morton as "Alpha": The leader of the Whisperers, a mysterious group of survivors who wear the skins of walkers to mask their presence. (seasons 9–10)
- Ryan Hurst as "Beta": The second-in-command of the Whisperers and Alpha's right-hand man. (season 10; recurring season 9)
- Eleanor Matsuura as Yumiko: Magna's girlfriend who is a proficient archer and former criminal defense lawyer. (seasons 10–11; recurring season 9)
- Cooper Andrews as Jerry: A member of the Kingdom and Ezekiel's steward. (seasons 10–11; recurring seasons 7–9)
- Nadia Hilker as Magna: The feisty leader of a small group of roaming survivors and Yumiko's girlfriend. (seasons 10–11; recurring season 9)
- Cailey Fleming as Judith Grimes: The biological daughter of Lori and Shane who was adopted by Rick after she was born. (seasons 10–11; recurring season 9) Judith was portrayed by several child actors when the character was younger after being born in the third season.
- Cassady McClincy as Lydia: Alpha's daughter and former Whisperer. (seasons 10–11; recurring season 9)
- Lauren Ridloff as Connie: A deaf member of Magna's group and Kelly's sister. (seasons 10–11; recurring season 9)
- Paola Lázaro as "Princess": A quirky and flamboyant survivor who has suffered various traumas in her past and later joins Eugene's group. (season 11; recurring season 10)
- Michael James Shaw as Mercer: A resident of the Commonwealth who serves as the general of the Commonwealth military. (season 11)
- Lynn Collins as Leah Shaw: A member of the Reapers and former protector of Dog who formed a loving connection with Daryl while he searched for Rick after his disappearance. (season 11; guest season 10)
- Josh Hamilton as Lance Hornsby: The deputy governor and director of operations at the Commonwealth. (season 11)
- Margot Bingham as Maxxine "Stephanie" Mercer: A resident of the Commonwealth who communicated with Eugene over the radio. She is also Mercer's younger sister. (season 11; guest season 10)
- Laila Robins as Pamela Milton: The governor of the Commonwealth. (season 11)
- Angel Theory as Kelly: Connie's alert and protective sister who has a gradual hearing loss. (season 11; recurring seasons 9–10)

=== Darabont connections ===
The series features several actors whom series developer Frank Darabont has worked with previously, including Laurie Holden (Andrea), Jeffrey DeMunn (Dale Horvath), Melissa McBride (Carol Peletier), Juan Pareja (Morales) and Sam Witwer (the dead soldier in the tank where Rick Grimes hides in "Days Gone Bye"). All five appeared in his 2007 film The Mist, along with Thomas Jane, who originally was set to star in the series as Rick Grimes when it was pitched to HBO. Jane was in fall 2010 in talks with Darabont to possibly guest star on the series; however, with Darabont's departure, a guest appearance for Jane never materialized. Holden also appeared in the 2001 film The Majestic, which Darabont also directed. DeMunn has appeared in several of Darabont's films; in addition to The Mist and The Majestic, he appeared in The Shawshank Redemption (1994) and The Green Mile (1999). It was planned that Witwer (Private Jessup in Darabont's The Mist) would reprise his "Days Gone Bye" role in the original conception of the series' second-season premiere and in a webisode, but both plans were discarded.

== Production ==
=== Development ===
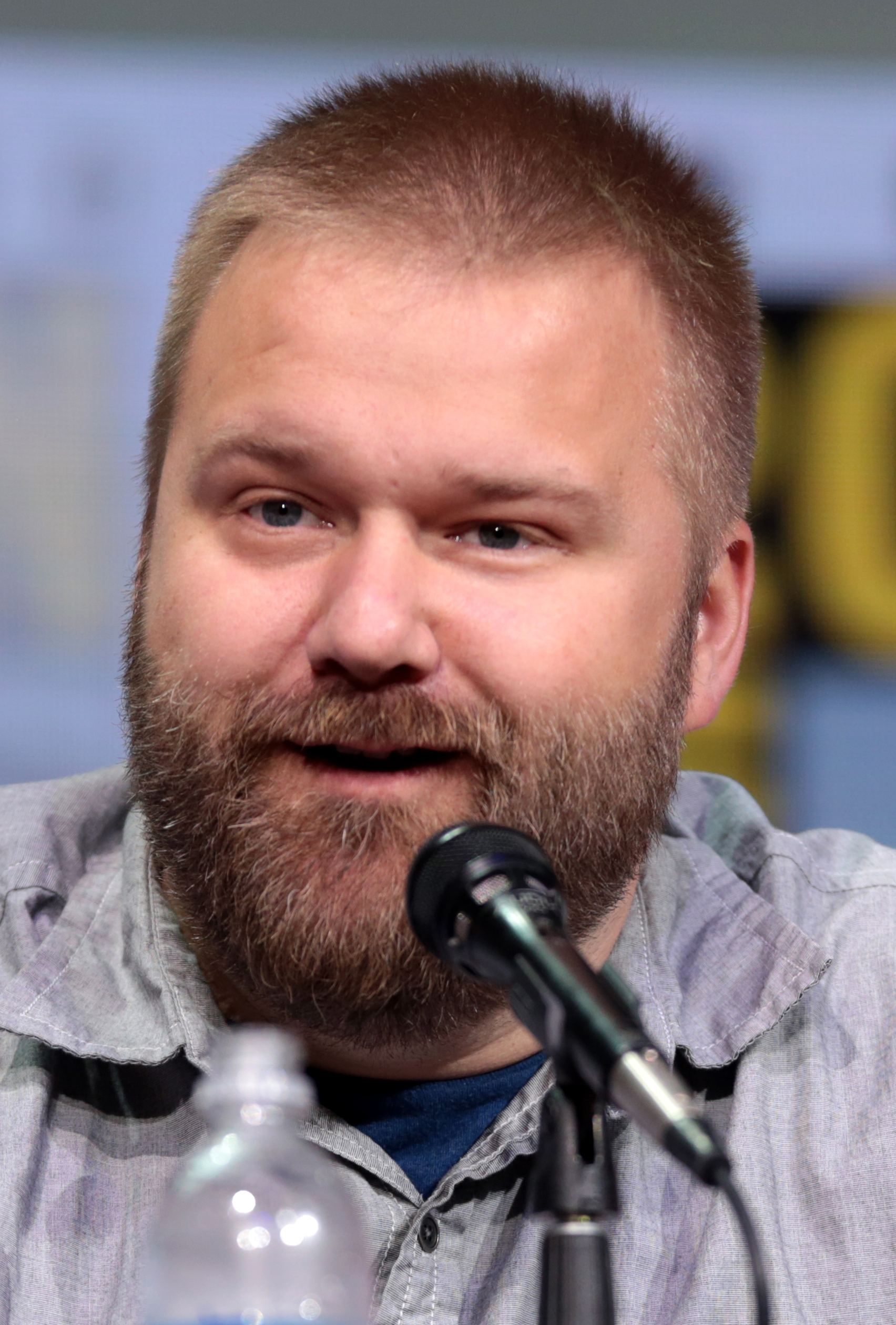
The Walking Dead creator Robert Kirkman is also an executive producer and writer of the television series.

On January 20, 2010, AMC officially announced that it had ordered a pilot for a possible series adapted from The Walking Dead comic book series, with Frank Darabont and Gale Anne Hurd acting as executive producers and Darabont writing and directing. The entire series was pre-ordered based just on the strength of the source material, the television scripts, and Darabont's involvement. In January 2010 a review of the pilot episode's script attracted further attention. The pilot began filming in Atlanta, Georgia, on May 15, 2010, after AMC had officially ordered a six-episode first season. The series's remaining episodes began filming on June 2, 2010, with Darabont serving as showrunner. On August 31, 2010, Darabont reported that The Walking Dead had been picked up for a second season, with production to begin in February 2011. On November 8, 2010, AMC confirmed that there would be a second season consisting of 13 episodes. He would also like to include some of the "environmental elements" that take place during Volume 2 of Kirkman's book.

=== Crew ===
The first season writing staff consisted of series developer and executive producer Frank Darabont (who wrote/co-wrote four of the six episodes), executive producer Charles H. Eglee, executive producer and creator of the comic book Robert Kirkman, co-executive producer Jack LoGiudice, consulting producer Adam Fierro and Glen Mazzara, all of whom contributed to one episode each. Along with Darabont, who directed the pilot episode, the remaining five were directed by Michelle MacLaren, Gwyneth Horder-Payton, Johan Renck, Ernest Dickerson, and Guy Ferland, respectively.

On December 1, 2010, Deadline Hollywood reported that Darabont had fired his writing staff, including executive producer Charles "Chic" Eglee, and planned to use freelance writers for the second season. Kirkman called the announcement "premature" and clarified that Eglee left to pursue other projects when Darabont decided to stay on as showrunner, and no definitive plans had been made regarding the writing staff for the second season.

[Chic Eglee] was brought onto The Walking Dead with the idea that Frank was going to work on the first season and then go off and do movies [...] Chic didn't want to be second-in-command on a show when he's used to being a top dog, and so he decided to go off and do something else, which is something that happens and is not a big deal.

— Robert Kirkman, TV Guide

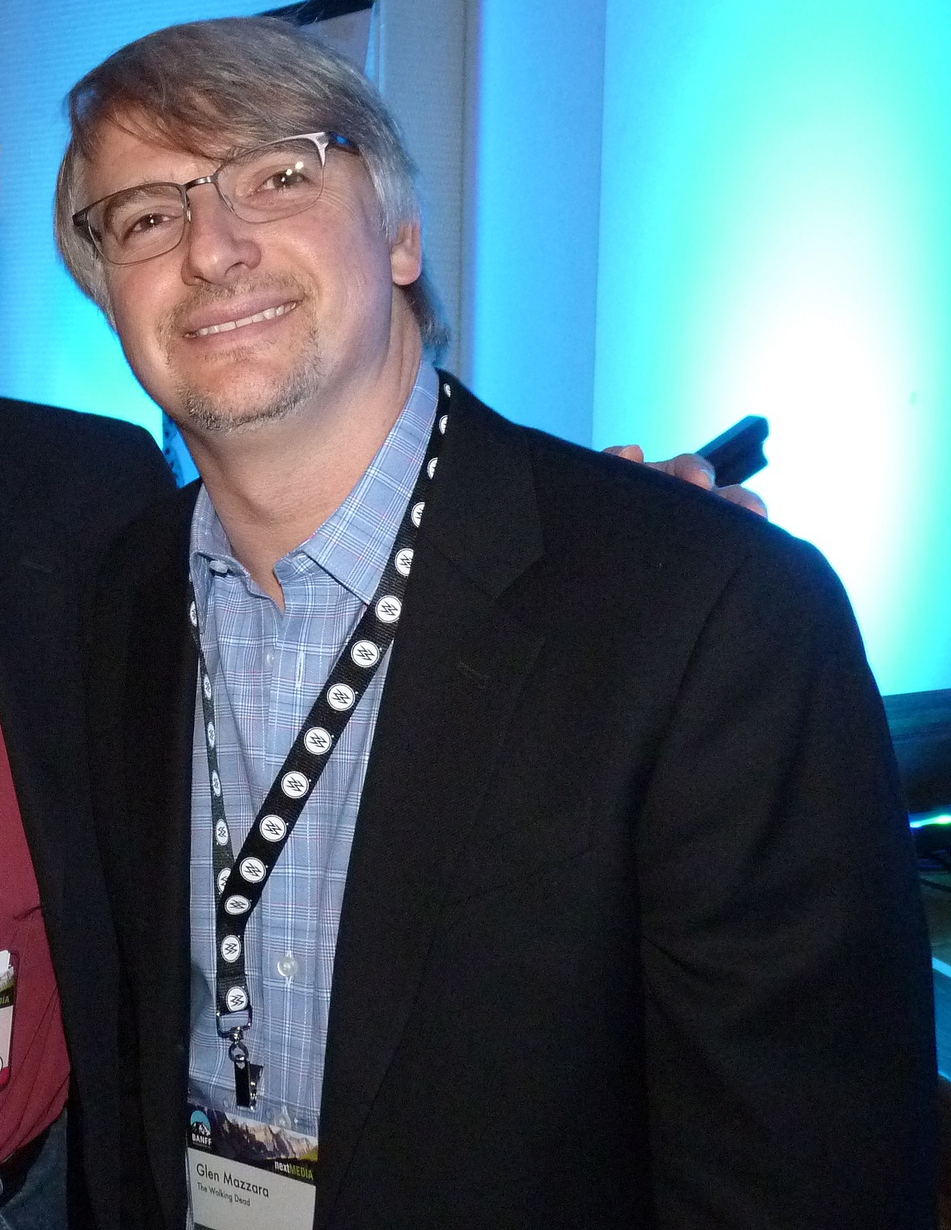
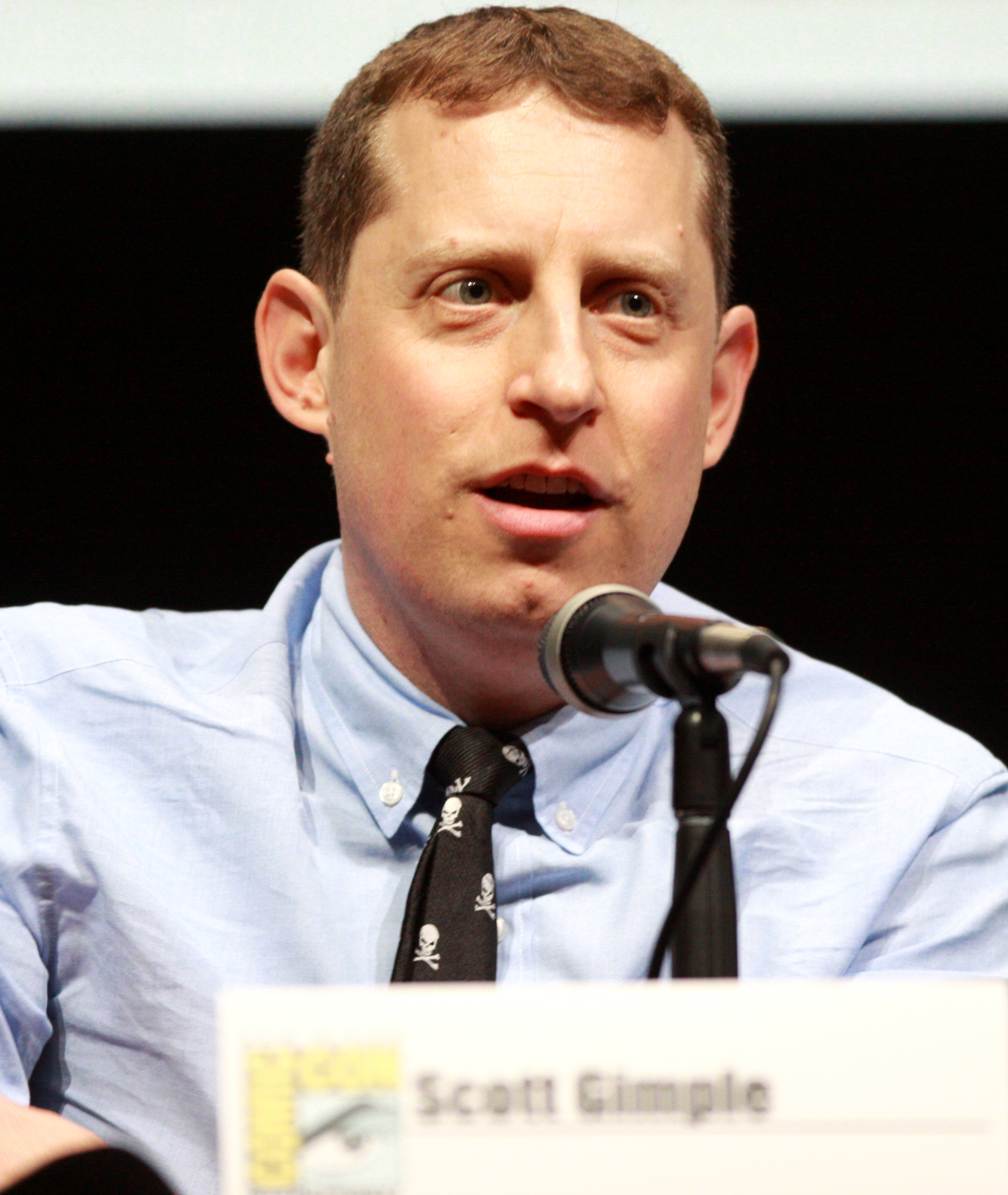
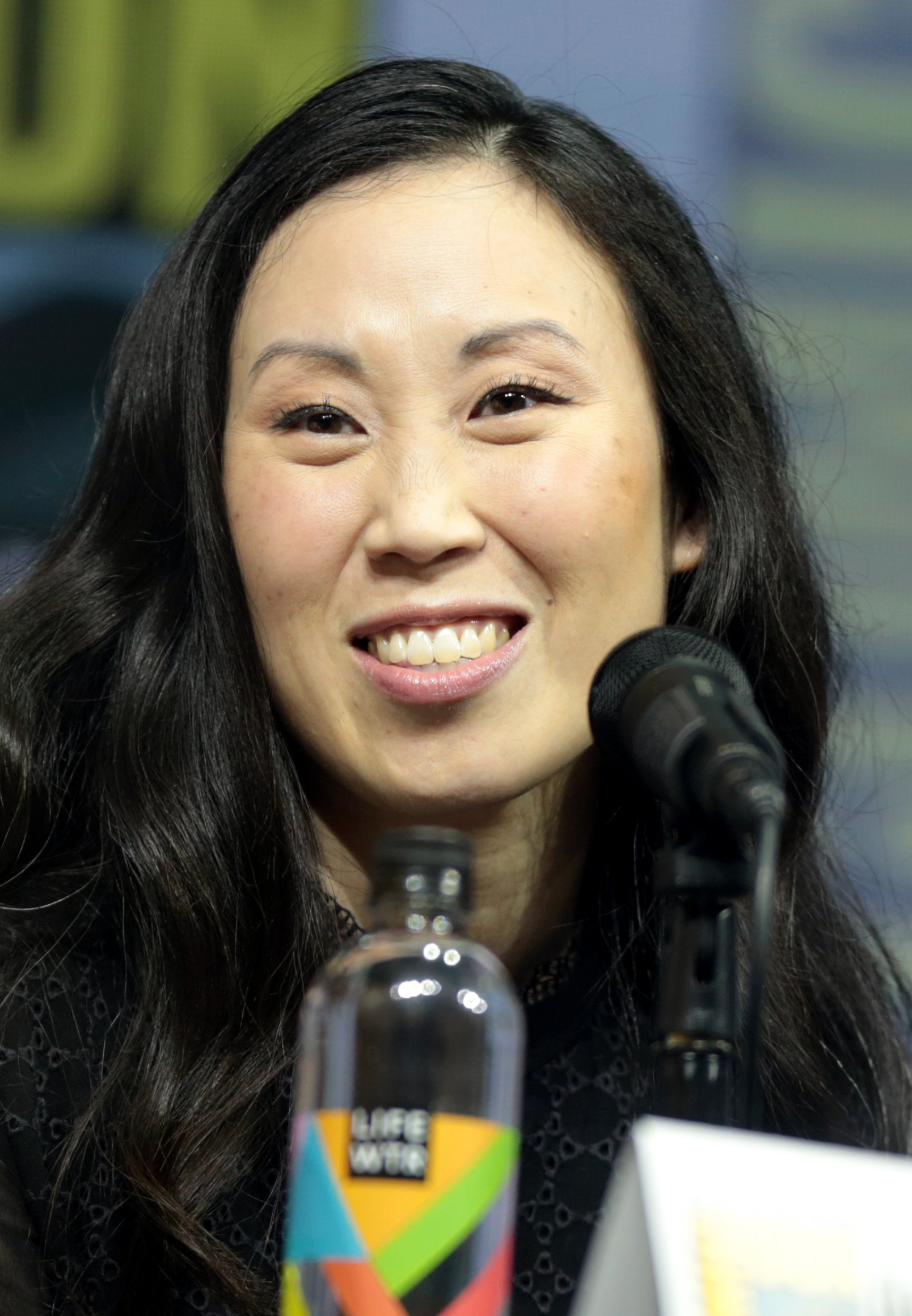
After the departure of Frank Darabont, the role of showrunner was assumed by Glen Mazzara (left) for the second and third seasons, Scott M. Gimple (middle) from the fourth to the eighth season, and Angela Kang (right) from the ninth to the eleventh season.

On December 3, 2010, in an interview with Entertainment Weekly, executive producer Gale Anne Hurd commented: "It's completely inaccurate. [In] the writers' room, there are people that have set up other projects that will be their first priority if their own series is picked up as a pilot or if it's a series. I think [Eglee] just decided that he wants to run his own show." She revealed that it would be likely for the series to return in October 2011, as Darabont and Kirkman planned on mapping out the next season early in 2011. She also confirmed that, "every one of the principal cast is signed up for multiple seasons." In July 2011, series developer and showrunner Frank Darabont was fired from his position as showrunner for the series, over unethical business practices from AMC higher-ups (see Lawsuits below).

Executive producer Glen Mazzara was appointed the new showrunner in Darabont's place. New writers joined the writing staff in the second season, including co-executive producer Evan Reilly, producer Scott M. Gimple, story editor Angela Kang, and David Leslie Johnson. New writers in the third season included producers Nichole Beattie and Sang Kyu Kim, with Frank Renzulli contributing a freelance script.

After the conclusion of the third season, Glen Mazzara stepped down from his position as showrunner and executive producer for the series, per a mutual agreement between Mazzara and AMC. The press release read, "Both parties acknowledge that there is a difference of opinion about where the show should go moving forward, and conclude that it is best to part ways." Scott M. Gimple succeeded Mazzara as showrunner for the fourth season, with new writers joining the writing staff, such as Curtis Gwinn, Channing Powell, and Matt Negrete. In January 2018, it was announced that Gimple would be promoted to the newly created position of Chief Content Officer of the entire Walking Dead franchise, and that Angela Kang would replace him as showrunner beginning with the ninth season.

=== Writing ===
The television series generally tends to follow Kirkman's comic series across major characters and plots; for instance, events of the premiere episode of the seventh season correlate to events in issue #100 of the comics. The series does not attempt to go step-by-step with the comics, and has leeway in the narrative. In particular, the series's writers, along with Kirkman, often "transfer" how a character has died in the comics to a different character in the series. For example, in the fourth season, where Hershel Greene is beheaded by the Governor in the standoff with Rick's group at the prison; in the comic, Tyreese is the one who suffers this fate. Some of the television characters, like Carol, have far outlived their comic counterparts, while others that have already been killed off, like Sophia and Andrea, remained alive for some time in the ongoing comic series. In addition, the writers have included characters wholly novel to the series such as Daryl Dixon, which producer Gale Anne Hurd says helps to create a new dynamic for the series, and keeps the audience guessing from what had already been established in the comic series.

=== Casting ===
The Walking Dead has featured a large rotating ensemble cast. In most cases, because of the nature of the show, departure of actors from the show are determined by the writing, with characters either killed off or written off the show as necessary to develop the story. Cast members are generally told ahead of time if they have been written off the show, but otherwise kept to secrecy. For example, Steven Yeun, who played Glenn Rhee since the pilot through the season seven premiere, knew of his character's death for a year but had to keep quiet, while Chandler Riggs, playing Carl Grimes through the eighth season, was told of his character's departure during the filming in the weeks leading into his final episodes.

A few actors have left the show under their own terms due to other commitments or changes, with the writings adopting the plot around these changes:

- Andrew Lincoln played the series's protagonist Rick Grimes since the pilot. Lincoln announced his plan to leave the show at the start of the ninth season, finding that having to spend half a year in the United States for filming left him missing out on his family in the United Kingdom. Lincoln completed five episodes in the season to close out Rick's storyline within the series, and was originally planned to be continued in three films. In July 2022, it was announced that Lincoln, along with Gurira, will star in a six-episode miniseries in the place of the three films.
- Lauren Cohan played Maggie Greene since the second season. As contract negotiations began for the ninth season, Cohan had been given the opportunity to star in Whiskey Cavalier, limiting how much time she would be able to give to the show. Cohan appeared as Maggie for the first five episodes of the season. In October 2019, it was confirmed that Cohan would return as a series regular for the eleventh season.
- Danai Gurira played Michonne since the third season, and announced that she would be leaving the show after the tenth season, participating in a handful of episodes balanced against her other acting commitments.
- Both Lennie James (as Morgan Jones) and Austin Amelio (as Dwight) were transferred from the main series after season eight to the spinoff series Fear the Walking Dead. James joined the cast of Fear the Walking Dead in season four and Amelio joined the cast in season five.

Casting salaries for the principal actors have grown significantly over the course of the show, up through the seventh season. Overall, the salaries had been lower compared to other similar dramas, including AMC's own Mad Men, but this was justified due to the volatility of any character being potentially written off the show. Norman Reedus and Melissa McBride, playing Daryl Dixon and Carol Peletier respectively, had made around US$9,500 per episode during the first season, and by the seventh season, had gotten up to US$80,000 per episode. Lincoln himself was only earning US$90,000 per episode in the seventh season. By season nine, with the departure of Lincoln, Reedus had repeated secured a US$350,000 per episode pay plus additional incentives, potentially earning him US$50–90 million over three seasons. McBride similarly had gotten an extended contract in season nine worth US$20 million over three seasons. Both of these were intended to secure the pair as central figures for the show going forward in Lincoln's absence.

=== Music ===
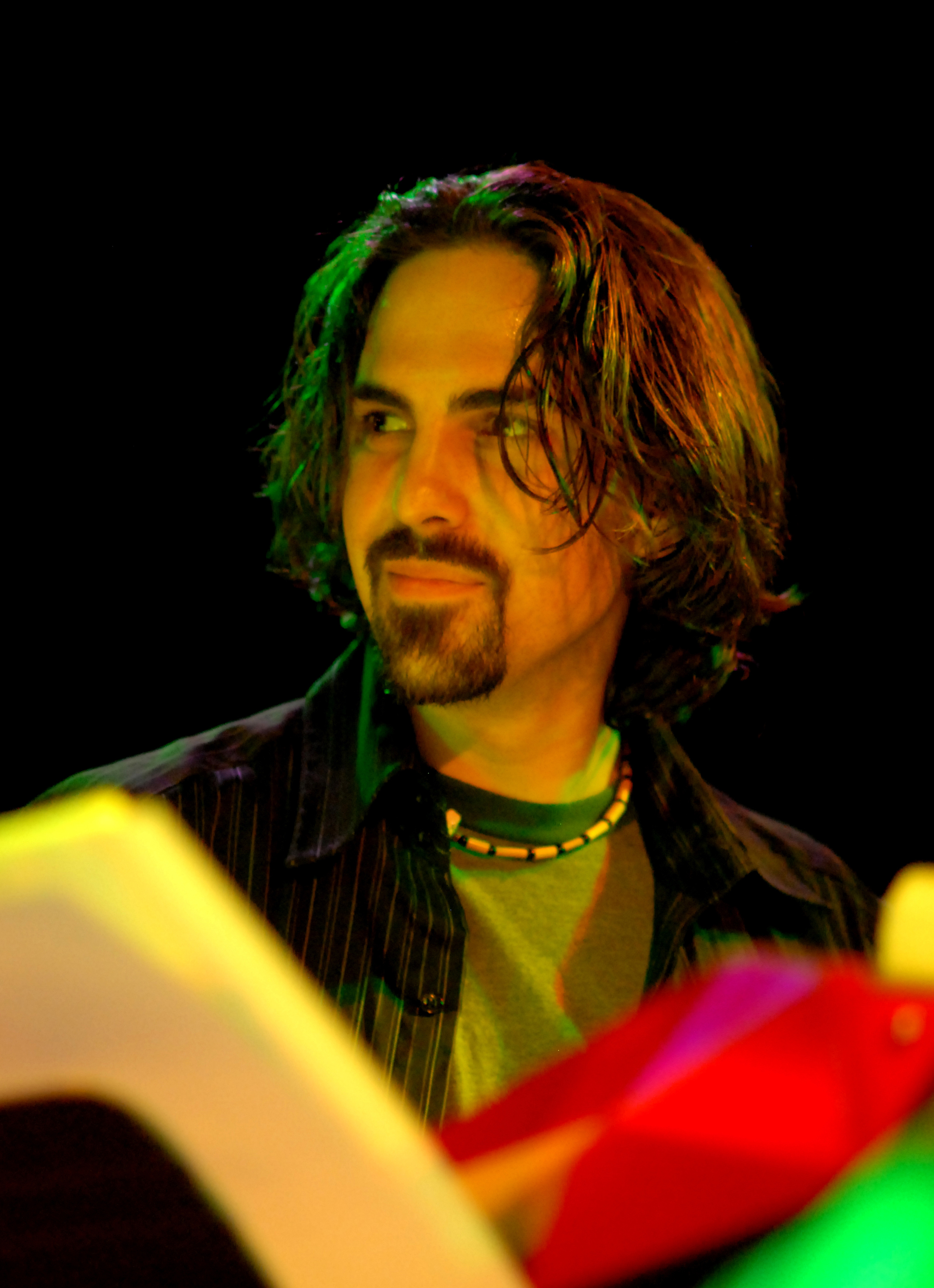
Bear McCreary composes The Walking Dead score

Bear McCreary was hired to compose the score for the series. McCreary stated that the main theme was based on his viewing of production designs for the opening title sequence. Instead of doing a full theme song as with his earlier works, McCreary chose to use a simple, repeating motif from the strings section.

It repeats over and over, and in fact in the pilot episode, you start hearing it before the main title begins, and this is something that continues episode to episode. You hear the main title music before the main title begins, so you know it's coming. That, to me, was the little hook – that little thing that, whenever you hear it, it takes you to the series.

— Bear McCreary

==== Soundtracks ====
Four soundtracks for The Walking Dead have been released to date. The Walking Dead: AMC Original Soundtrack, Vol. 1 was released on March 17, 2013. The second volume was released on March 25, 2014. Songs of Survival is a soundtrack for the third season and it was released on August 27, 2013, by Republic Records as a Walmart exclusive for the special edition release of the third season. Songs of Survival, Vol. 2 is a soundtrack for the fourth season and it was released on August 26, 2014, by Republic Records as a Walmart exclusive of the fourth season release.

=== Makeup ===
Greg Nicotero is an executive producer and the key special effects makeup artist on the series. Each walker is put through "zombie school" and is taught how to move like a zombie. There are three levels of zombie makeup: Hero, Midground, and Deep Background. Hero zombies are featured walkers and are completely made over from head to toe. Midground zombies get highlights and shadows on the face, but do not get close enough to the camera to require full makeup. Deep background zombies often wear masks and are only meant to be used as a backdrop.

=== Filming ===
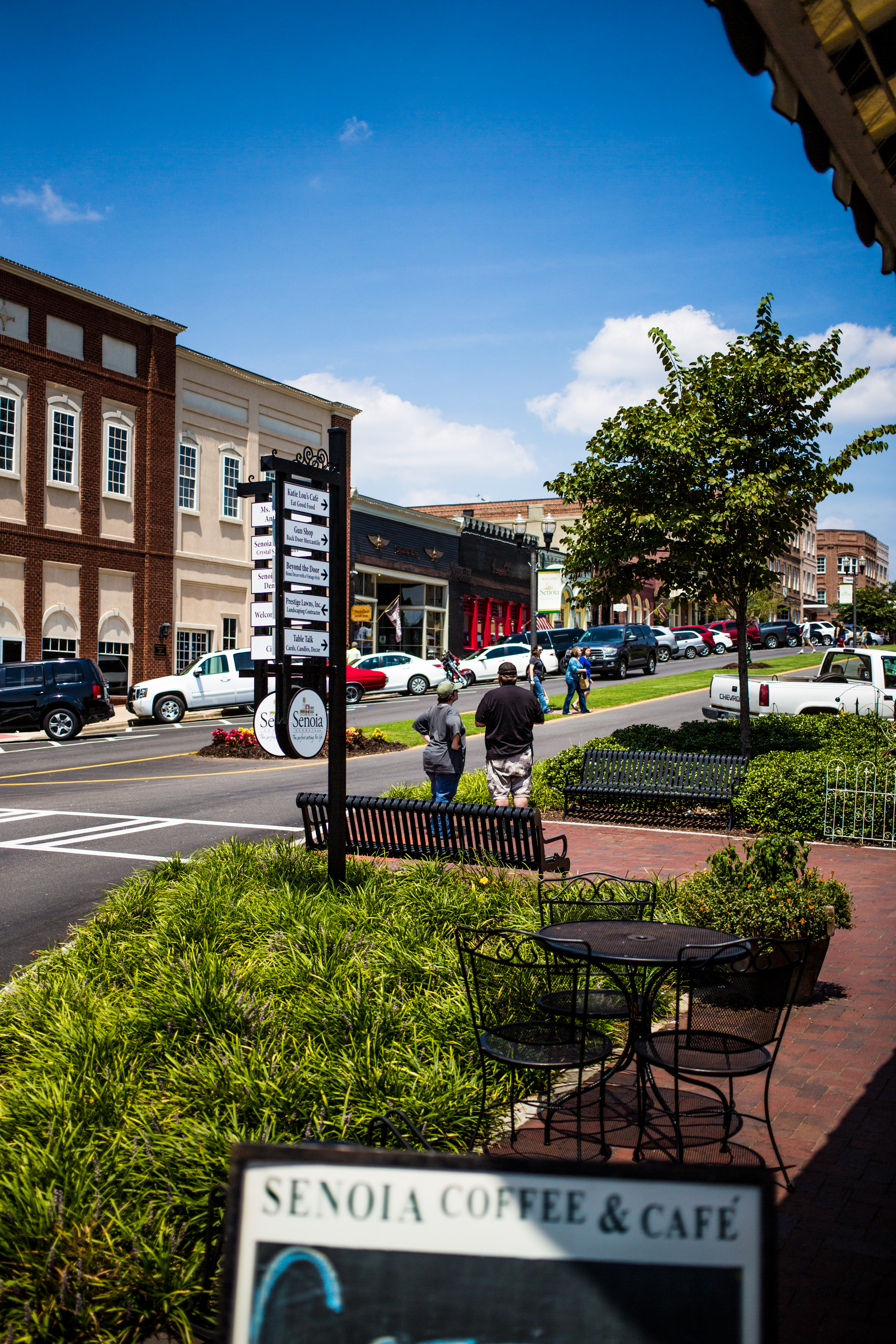
Downtown Senoia, Georgia was used as the setting for Woodbury during the third season

The Walking Dead is predominantly filmed in Georgia. Since 2002, the state has offered a tax incentive for large film productions to drive producers to the state and bolster its economy.

The first season was shot primarily in Atlanta, but required a great deal of coordination with the city to shut down streets and parks for filming. Production for subsequent seasons moved mainly to Riverwood Studios (doing business as Raleigh Studios Atlanta), a plot of land covering approximately 120 acres (0.49 km^{2}), located outside of Senoia, Georgia. Some existing buildings were used here, such as a subdivision that is used by several families, which serves as the Alexandria Safe-Zone. Other buildings are constructed as sets, such as the exterior shots of the main Hilltop mansion, the trash heaps used by the Scavengers, or Father Gabriel's church. Sets are torn down when no longer needed; the church, after its use in the fifth season, was removed and its spot used for the iconic setting for the first meeting between Rick's group and Negan in the seventh season. The property includes sound stages constructed for interior shots, which then may be reused; the interior sets for the prison during the third season were reused to serve as the buildings and sets for the Savior's Sanctuary in the seventh season. In July 2017, AMC purchased the studio lot from Riverwood for $8.25 million.

Some scenes are shot outside of the studio. Woodbury, during the third season, was filmed in downtown Senoia. Other exceptions include the Kingdom, which is filmed at the former military base Fort McPherson, now converted to studios for Tyler Perry.

The series was shot on 16 mm film up until the end of the tenth season before it transitioned to digital for the series' final 30 episodes. The change was due to the COVID-19 pandemic with there being fewer "touch points" with digital than film. David Tattersall was the director of photography for the pilot episode with David Boyd as the director of photography on the remainder of the episodes. Production design is done by Greg Melton and Alex Hajdu. The effects team includes veteran special effects makeup designers Greg Nicotero and Toby Sells, special effects coordinator Darrell Pritchett, and visual effects supervisors Sam Nicholson and Jason Sperling. Greg Nicotero also served as the primary director for the series, directing 35 episodes up until 2021.

=== Marketing ===
The Walking Dead debuted during the same week in 120 countries. As part of an expansive campaign to advertise and heighten anticipation for the premiere, AMC and Fox International Channels coordinated a worldwide zombie invasion event on October 26, 2010. The stunt involved invading 26 major cities within a 24-hour period, starting with Taipei and Hong Kong, and ending in Los Angeles for the American premiere.

The series's official website released, just prior to San Diego Comic-Con in 2010, a motion comic based on Issue No. 1 of the original comic and voiced by Phil LaMarr. The site also posted a making-of documentary primarily about the first episode, as well as a number of other behind-the-scenes videos and interviews. In the documentary, comic series creator and television series executive producer Robert Kirkman, as well as artist Charlie Adlard, say they are pleased with how faithful the series is to the comic and remark on the similarities between the actors and the comic's original character drawings.

Action figures of characters from the series were created for release in November 2011 and have continued throughout the years with eight line-ups. The figures, which are manufactured by McFarlane Toys, are designed to resemble the actors on the series. Figures created to resemble the characters as drawn in the comic book were released in September 2011. In December 2020, it was announced by AMC that Chris Hardwick would host a special for the show featuring the appearances of various cast members, titled The Walking Dead Holiday Special, to promote the show and "reminisce on the franchise series' past". The special was released on December 13, 2020.

=== Green initiatives ===
With a primary objective of reducing the environmental impacts of film and television productions, including The Walking Dead, producer Gale Anne Hurd has directed the cast, crew, production team, suppliers, and bloggers about her series to adopt the Doddle app to make the production almost paper-free; this works by digitally transmitting interactive call sheets and other intra-team and team-supplier communications (such as directions, images, menus, and updates) to people's cell phones and tablets. Hurd said of using Doddle: in addition to conserving paper, "It's also easier, and it's better for security. People are less likely to leave their smartphone or tablet lying around for someone else to pick up."

Hurd describes additional steps taken to increase efficiency and cut production costs: "If you use vehicles that get better gas mileage, that are electric or hybrids, you're going to pay a lot less in fuel. If you use compact fluorescent bulbs, you're going to save a lot of money in utilities. If you recycle even your own sets, and use them again, that's going to save money. You don't have to buy new lumber. So there are cost savings, absolutely." Additionally, the production team aims to reduce vehicle idling, which decreases carbon dioxide emissions.

Hurd also cuts down on plastic waste by personally using a refillable, stainless steel EcoUsable water bottle and promoting its use among her colleagues. She shared: "on a lot of my projects I give them as crew gifts before we start production, and have water stations available, but you can't force people to use them."

== Release ==
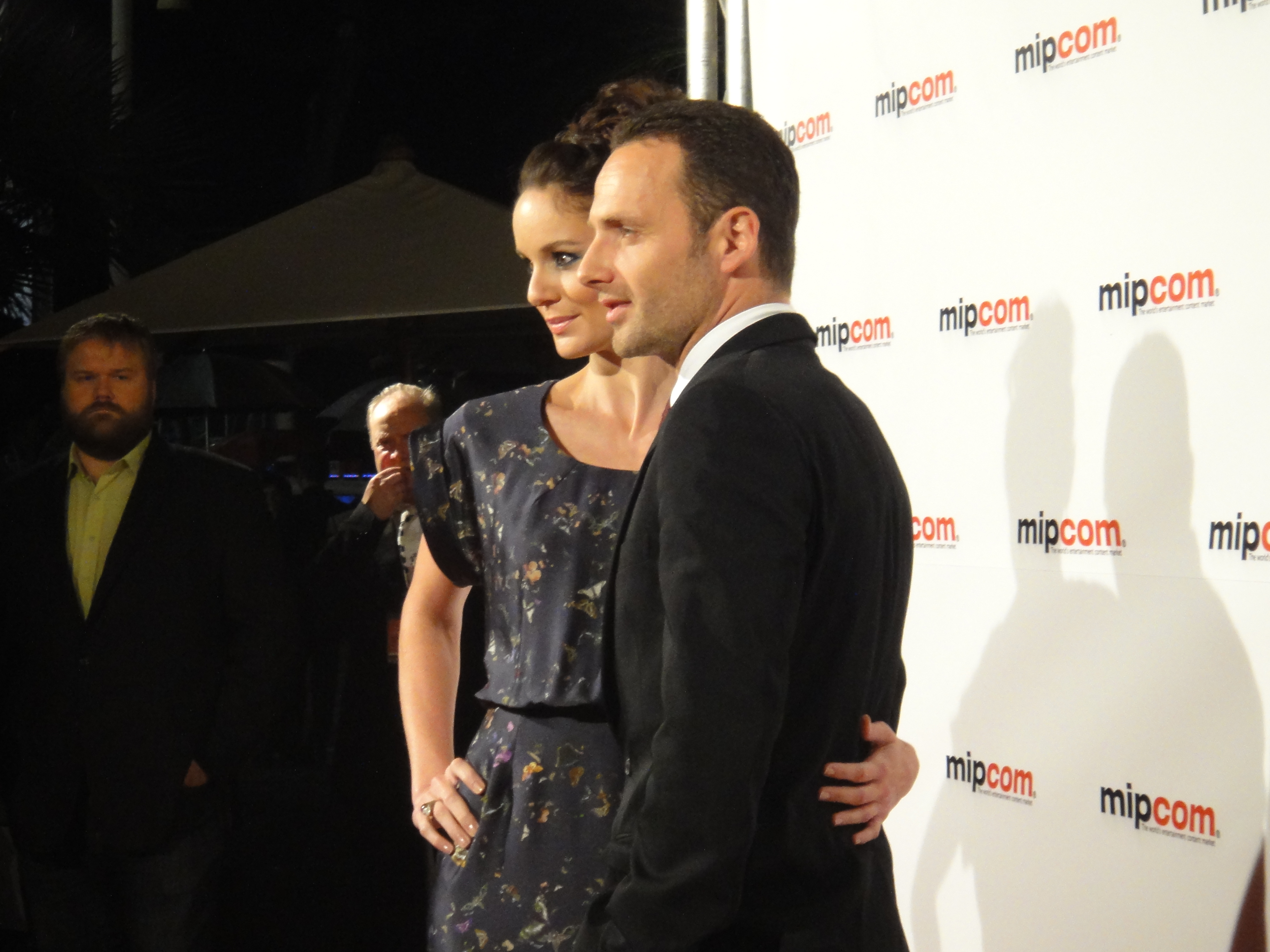
Sarah Wayne Callies and Andrew Lincoln in 2010; Robert Kirkman is in the background on the left

Scenes from the pilot were screened July 23, 2010, as part of San Diego Comic-Con in 2010. It premiered on AMC on October 31, 2010, and premiered internationally on Fox International Channels during the first week of November. Almost two weeks before the official premiere on AMC, the pilot episode leaked online.

International broadcast rights for the series were sold and announced on June 14, 2010. The series airs on Fox International Channels in 126 countries in 33 languages. The fifth season debuted its first part on October 13, 2014. The second part premiered on February 9, 2015. On May 20, 2021, it was announced, following the closure of the Fox channel in the UK and Ireland, that the eleventh and final season would instead be released on the Star hub on Disney+ the day after episodes air in the United States.

=== Home media ===
The first season DVD and Blu-ray was released on March 8, 2011. A three-disc special edition of the first season—featuring new featurettes and audio commentaries—was released on DVD and Blu-ray on October 4, 2011. The European versions of the first season DVD and Blu-ray are edited for gore, with cuts to episode two ("Guts"), episode three ("Tell It to the Frogs"), episode four ("Vatos") and episode five ("Wildfire"). Until eOne/WVG re-released the first season in D-A-CH in a Special Uncut Version on DVD and Blu-ray on May 31, 2013.

The second season DVD and Blu-ray was released on August 28, 2012. It was also released as a limited edition Blu-ray, packaged as a miniature zombie head designed by McFarlane Toys. Special features include audio commentaries, deleted scenes, webisodes, and several featurettes.

The third season DVD and Blu-ray was released on August 27, 2013. It was also released as a limited edition Blu-ray, packaged as a miniature version of the Governor's zombie head aquarium tank designed by Greg Nicotero and sculpted by McFarlane Toys. Special features include audio commentaries, deleted scenes, and several featurettes.

The fourth season DVD and Blu-ray was released on August 26, 2014. It was also released as a limited edition Blu-ray, packaged with a tree-walker designed by McFarlane Toys. Special features include audio commentaries, deleted scenes, and several featurettes, as well as extended episodes which are exclusive to the Blu-ray.

The fifth season DVD and Blu-ray was released on August 25, 2015, the sixth season on August 23, 2016, the seventh season on August 22, 2017, the eighth season on August 21, 2018, the ninth season on August 20, 2019, the tenth season on July 20, 2021, and the eleventh season on March 14, 2023.

Home video release for the first six seasons was distributed by Anchor Bay Entertainment (under license from AMC Networks), with releases for the seventh season onwards distributed by Lionsgate Home Entertainment in the United States. The international home video releases were distributed by Entertainment One.

=== Syndication ===
MyNetworkTV acquired the broadcast syndication rights to the series, premiering on October 1, 2014. The version that airs on MyNetworkTV is edited to meet broadcast television standards.

== Reception ==
=== Critical reception ===
Critical response of The Walking Dead
Season	Rotten Tomatoes	Metacritic
1	87% (101 reviews)	82 (25 reviews)
2	80% (203 reviews)	80 (22 reviews)
3	88% (327 reviews)	82 (19 reviews)
4	81% (316 reviews)	75 (16 reviews)
5	90% (374 reviews)	80 (11 reviews)
6	76% (512 reviews)	79 (10 reviews)
7	66% (620 reviews)	—N/a
8	65% (447 reviews)	—N/a
9	89% (364 reviews)	72 (4 reviews)
10	77% (392 reviews)	—N/a
11	81% (224 reviews)	—N/a

The first six seasons and the ninth, tenth and eleventh seasons of The Walking Dead have been well reviewed by recognized critics, while the seventh and eighth seasons received more mixed reviews. On Rotten Tomatoes, the series has an average score of 80%.

For the first season, 87% of 100 Rotten Tomatoes critics gave it a positive review, with an average score of 7.35/10. That site's consensus states, "Blood-spattered, emotionally resonant, and white-knuckle intense, The Walking Dead puts an intelligent spin on the overcrowded zombie subgenre." Metacritic scored the first season 82/100 based on 25 critic reviews, 23 of which were positive, two mixed, and none negative.

For the second season, 80% of 203 critic reviews on Rotten Tomatoes were positive, with an average score of 8.05/10. The site's consensus states, "The second season of The Walking Dead fleshes out the characters while maintaining the grueling tension and gore that made the show a hit." Of 22 Metacritic critic reviews, 18 were positive, four were mixed, and none were negative; their average score was 80/100. Early criticism of the series focused on the slow pace of the second season, particularly the first half. Ken Tucker of Entertainment Weekly, described the series as "a nighttime soap", comparing it to "a parody of a Samuel Beckett play" that had very little sense of direction and few appearances of walkers. Nate Rawlings of Time's online entertainment section noted that "the pace during the first half of this season has been brutally slow. [...] They've tried to develop individual characters, but each subplot meant to add a layer to a character has been quickly resolved." Later reviews from other critics, such as Scott Wampler of Collider.com, recognized the increased quality of the second half, stating it "seemed far more intense, more interesting, better written". Recognizing the overall season, Kevin Yeoman of Screen Rant offered praise saying "the writers succeeded in unshackling themselves from the intermittent monotony brought about by the serial nature of the show".

The third season had 88% of Rotten Tomatoes' 327 critics giving it a positive review, with an average score of 7.85/10. The site's consensus states, "The palpable terror and visceral thrills continue in the third season of The Walking Dead, along with a deeper sense of the people who inhabit its apocalyptic landscape." Metacritic's 19 critics rated the season 82/100, all of whom gave a positive review.

For the fourth season, 81% of Rotten Tomatoes' 316 critic reviews were positive, with an average score of 7.60/10. The site's consensus states, "Consistently thrilling, with solid character development and enough gore to please grindhouse fans, this season of The Walking Dead continues to demonstrate why it's one of the best horror shows on television". Metacritic scored the season 75/100 based on 16 critic reviews, 13 of which were positive, three mixed, and none negative.

The fifth season had 90% of Rotten Tomatoes' 374 critic reviews rating it positively, with an average score of 6.95/10. The site's consensus states, "Thanks to a liberal dose of propulsive, bloody action and enough compelling character moments to reward longtime fans, The Walking Dead's fifth season continues to deliver top-notch entertainment." Metacritic scored the fifth season 80/100 based on 11 critic reviews, all of which were positive.

For the sixth season, 76% of Rotten Tomatoes' 512 critic reviews were positive, with an average score of 7.40/10. The site's consensus states, "Six seasons in, The Walking Dead is still finding ways to top itself, despite slow patches that do little to advance the plot." Metacritic scored the sixth season 79/100 based on 10 critic reviews, nine of which were positive, one mixed, and none negative.

For the seventh season, 66% of Rotten Tomatoes' 620 critic reviews rated it positively, with an average score of 6.85/10. The site's consensus is, "Increased character depth and effective world-building helps The Walking Dead overcome a tiresome reliance on excessive, gratuitous violence." After the controversial season premiere episode was aired, critic Matt Zoller Seitz criticized the series' consistently cynical use of violence, stating that "The longer this series goes on, the more obvious it becomes that the violence is the point, and everything else is an intellectual fig leaf."

For the eighth season, 65% of Rotten Tomatoes' 447 critic reviews rated it positively, with an average score of 6.65/10. The site's consensus states "The Walking Dead's eighth season energizes its characters with some much-needed angst and action, though it's still occasionally choppy and lacking forward-moving plot progression."

For the ninth season, 89% of Rotten Tomatoes' 365 critic reviews were positive, with an average score of 7.15/10. The site's consensus states, "Nine seasons in, The Walking Dead feels more alive than ever, with heightened tension and a refreshed pace that rejuvenates this long-running franchise." Metacritic scored the ninth season 72/100 based on 4 critic reviews, 3 of which were positive, one mixed, and none negative.

For the tenth season, 77% of Rotten Tomatoes' 392 critic reviews were positive, with an average score of 7/10. The site's consensus states, "A few changes in front of and behind the camera allow TWD create space for compelling new stories and some seriously scary new adversaries."

For the eleventh season, 81% of Rotten Tomatoes' 224 critic reviews were positive, with an average score of 5.7/10. The site's consensus states, "While the sense of finality is diminished by the promise of even more spinoffs, The Walking Dead's eleventh conclusion is a solid enough conclusion to an epic tale of zombies that never had a clear offramp to begin with.

In 2013, TV Guide ranked The Walking Dead as the #8 sci-fi show.

=== Comments about diversity ===
Some critics have commented on the increasing diversity of the series. This approach was initially applauded by commentators. In 2015, Lindsay Putnam of the New York Post questioned whether the show was in danger of becoming "too diverse" as the show "seemingly reached critical mass for its nonwhite, nonmale survivors — and now has no choice but to kill them off". Robert Kirkman has discussed the increasing diversity of the show and the comic books. He has described how he regrets the lack of diversity in the early issues of the comic book series and explained how they would have been "vastly more diverse" if he were to have started them now.

=== Ratings ===
During its first season, The Walking Dead attracted between four and six million viewers. Viewership began to increase in its second season. During seasons three to seven, it attracted ten to seventeen million viewers. In 2012, during its third season, it became the first cable series in television history to have the highest total viewership of any series during the fall season among 18- to 49-year-old adults. In 2014, total viewership for the show's fifth-season premiere was 17.3 million, overtaking High School Musical 2 as the highest-rated non-sports broadcast on U.S. cable television.. In 2016, a New York Times study of the 50 television series with the most Facebook likes found that like most other zombie series, The Walking Dead "is most popular in rural areas, particularly southern Texas and eastern Kentucky". Ratings began to decline during season seven and continued to steadily drop thereafter. The ratings decline was attributed to a variety of factors, including Rick's presumed death. By the end of season nine, the show had fewer viewers than it had at any time since its first season.

Viewership and ratings per season of The Walking Dead
Season	Timeslot (ET)	Episodes	First aired		Last aired		Avg. viewers (millions)
Season	Timeslot (ET)	Episodes	Date	Viewers (millions)	Date	Viewers (millions)	Avg. viewers (millions)
1	Sunday 10:00 pm	6	October 31, 2010	5.35	December 5, 2010	5.97	5.24
2	Sunday 9:00 pm	13	October 16, 2011	7.26	March 18, 2012	8.99	6.90
3	Sunday 9:00 pm	16	October 14, 2012	10.87	March 31, 2013	12.40	N/A
4	Sunday 9:00 pm	16	October 13, 2013	16.11	March 30, 2014	15.68	N/A
5	Sunday 9:00 pm	16	October 12, 2014	17.30	March 29, 2015	15.78	N/A
6	Sunday 9:00 pm	16	October 11, 2015	14.63	April 3, 2016	14.19	N/A
7	Sunday 9:00 pm	16	October 23, 2016	17.03	April 2, 2017	11.31	N/A
8	Sunday 9:00 pm	16	October 22, 2017	11.44	April 15, 2018	7.92	N/A
9	Sunday 9:00 pm	16	October 7, 2018	6.08	March 31, 2019	5.02	N/A
10	Sunday 9:00 pm	22	October 6, 2019	4.00	April 4, 2021	2.12	N/A
11	Sunday 9:00 pm	24	August 22, 2021	2.22	November 20, 2022	2.27	N/A

=== Awards and nominations ===
The Walking Dead was nominated for Best New Series by the Writers Guild of America Awards 2011 and Best Television Series Drama by the 68th Golden Globe Awards. The series was named one of the top 10 television programs of 2010 by the American Film Institute Awards 2010. For the 37th Saturn Awards, the series received six nominations—for Best Television Presentation, Andrew Lincoln for Best Actor in Television, Sarah Wayne Callies for Best Actress on Television, Steven Yeun for Best Supporting Actor in Television, Laurie Holden for Best Supporting Actress in Television, and Noah Emmerich for Best Guest Starring Role in Television. The series was nominated for Best Drama Series by the inaugural 1st Critics' Choice Television Awards. The pilot episode "Days Gone Bye" received three nominations from the 63rd Primetime Emmy Awards—for Outstanding Sound Editing for a Series and Outstanding Special Visual Effects for a Series and won for Outstanding Prosthetic Makeup for a Series, Miniseries, Movie, or Special. For the 41st Saturn Awards, the series received its highest number of nominations, with a total of seven, including for the series itself, Andrew Lincoln for Best Actor on Television, Norman Reedus for Best Supporting Actor on Television, Emily Kinney and Melissa McBride for Best Supporting Actress on Television, Andrew J. West for Best Guest Star on Television, and Chandler Riggs for Best Young Performer on Television.

== Franchise and spin-offs ==
=== Webisodes ===
As of 2018, four web series based on The Walking Dead have been released via AMC's website: Torn Apart (2011), Cold Storage (2012), The Oath (2013) and Red Machete (2017).

=== Talking Dead ===
A live television aftershow titled Talking Dead premiered on AMC on October 16, 2011, following the encore presentation of The Walking Dead's second-season premiere. Talking Dead features host Chris Hardwick discussing the latest episode with fans, actors, and producers of The Walking Dead.

=== Television series ===
==== Fear the Walking Dead ====
Fear the Walking Dead is a companion series to The Walking Dead, developed by AMC. AMC started development of the series around September 2013 and committed to a two-season broadcast by March 2015. Fear the Walking Dead first premiered on August 23, 2015. The series focused on the transition into the outbreak. The series ended on November 19, 2023, after the conclusion of the eighth and final season.

==== The Walking Dead: World Beyond ====
In April 2019, AMC officially announced it had ordered a 10-episode limited series created by Scott M. Gimple and Matthew Negrete. The series focuses on the first generation of children that have grown up during the zombie apocalypse who call themselves "Endlings", and are aware of how to survive if confronted by them, but have otherwise been raised behind walls and have never actually experienced survival. The series premiered on October 4, 2020, and ended on December 5, 2021, after two seasons.

==== Tales of the Walking Dead ====
In October 2021, AMC officially greenlit a six-episode series which premiered on August 14, 2022, and ended on September 18, 2022. Channing Powell, who wrote for both The Walking Dead and Fear the Walking Dead, served as showrunner. It is an episodic anthology series that features new and existing characters within The Walking Dead universe.

==== The Walking Dead: Dead City ====
In March 2022, AMC officially greenlit Isle of the Dead, starring Cohan and Morgan as their characters Maggie and Negan respectively. They are also executive producing with Eli Jorné, who is serving as showrunner. The series is set in Manhattan. In August 2022, the series was retitled as The Walking Dead: Dead City. The series premiered on June 18, 2023. In July 2023, it was renewed for a second season, which premiered on May 4, 2025. In July 2025, the series was renewed for a third season, which premiered on July 26, 2026.

==== The Walking Dead: Daryl Dixon ====
The Daryl-focused spinoff series premiered on September 10, 2023. In July 2023, it was renewed for a second season, which premiered on September 29, 2024. In July 2024, the series was renewed for a third season, which premiered on September 7, 2025. In July 2025, the series was renewed for a fourth and final season.

==== The Walking Dead: The Ones Who Live ====
The six-episode series featuring Rick and Michonne premiered on February 25, 2024, and ended on March 31, 2024.

==== In development ====
The development of a series entitled More Tales from the Walking Dead Universe was announced in April 2023.

=== Others ===
Wizards of the Coast worked with AMC to include characters and elements of The Walking Dead, into Magic: The Gathering as part of a 2020 "Secret Lair" card set.

=== Parodies and spoofs ===
Due to its popularity, The Walking Dead has inspired dozens of parodies and spoofs featured on YouTube channels like Bad Lip Reading and television series such as Saturday Night Live and Mad TV. Bad Lip Reading made a widely viewed parody involving Rick and the Governor, entitled "La-Bibbida-Bibba-Dum". The series's cast was shown the parody at San Diego Comic-Con in 2013, and David Morrissey—who portrays the Governor—reacted by saying he now understood why so many people would walk up to him on the street and blurt, "Hey, La-Bibbida-Bibba-Dum!" Until seeing the video, he had wondered, "what's wrong with these people?" The Walking Dead has also been represented as a live comedy performance by English comedian Dan Willis at the Edinburgh Festival. A parody film called The Walking Deceased was released in 2015.

=== Theme parks attractions ===
In 2018, at the British theme park Thorpe Park, a pre-existing roller coaster named X was re-themed after the TV series. In particular, the queue area and the exit path were heavily redesigned to reflect the atmosphere of the show, and on the busiest days there are also actors dressed as walkers who interact with the guests.

In 2022, at the Italian theme park Mirabilandia, a new walk-through attraction based on the TV series opened. Guests enter a large warehouse where the attraction takes place. After a short queue, the actual experience begins: it features several rooms themed after locations from the show, such as the hospital, the church, the mine, the sanctuary, the dump, and Terminus. Along the route, guests may encounter actors dressed as walkers who chase them.

== Lawsuits ==
=== Breach of contract suits ===
Frank Darabont's departure as showrunner in July 2011 during the second season came as surprise to many, as it came shortly after the season's premiere and a few days after that year's Comic-Con, where Darabont helped to promote the series. It was speculated that he was unable to adjust to the schedule of running a television series; however, The Hollywood Reporter reported that AMC had fired him. There had been reported difficulties in the production of the second season, including disputes over planned budget cuts and executive meddling, and it was known that Darabont and AMC had several discussions relating to these factors. Neither Darabont, AMC, nor the cast nor crew of The Walking Dead spoke about the reasons for his firing.

In December 2013, Darabont and his agents from Creative Artists Agency (CAA) filed a lawsuit against AMC in a New York court, citing breach of contract. A central part of Darabont's lawsuit accuses AMC of denying him and the CAA the promised profits from the success of the series, based on how AMC had used vertical integration in producing and distributing The Walking Dead. As stated in Darabont's filing, he had initially entered into a contract with AMC to have a third-party studio produce the series, from which he would have obtained 12.5% of that entity's profits, after standard deductions. AMC wanted to produce the series in-house, and for the first season, Darabont's lawyers had been assured that Darabont would be protected from self-dealing fees by having AMC commit to imputed license fees equivalent to those of other independent studios, with Darabont earning profit from that. Darabont's suit contends that when the series's popularity took off, AMC presented a license fee deal to Darabont around February 2011 that used "an unconscionably low license fee formula" such that AMC could report the series running at a loss and ensuring that Darabont would never see any profit from the series; as an example, the suit references statements in 2012, following the second season, that AMC claimed the series was running at a $49 million deficit, despite being one of the most popular series in broadcast. Darabont's suit contends he was fired just at the start of the second season so that AMC would avoid having to pay him.

Initial discovery phase hearings were held in 2014. Darabont's lawyers sought to gain information from AMC on their other series, specifically Breaking Bad and Mad Men, to obtain a "fair market value" for The Walking Dead. AMC asserted it had done no wrongdoing, had already paid Darabont $3 million upfront for two seasons, and was able to properly set the imputed license fee that worked into the profit formula for Darabont. The network resisted the request to provide otherwise confidential information on the other series. The court granted Darabont's lawyers access to the requested information as part of the discovery phase. Darabont described "crisis-level problems" during the series's production while under deposition, claiming that AMC had cut the per-episode budget from $3.4 million to $3 million while keeping the tax credit offered by the state of Georgia for filming there, effectively reducing the production budget by 25%.

In August 2015, Darabont requested to amend his original complaint that AMC further reduced his profits from the second season as his firing mid-season meant he was not fully vested in the season, allowing AMC to reduce the profits paid him. Darabont's amended request points out that he had written and produced all the episodes in that season already and was entitled to the proper profit share. The judge granted this amendment in February 2016, partially influenced by concerns raised in Darabont's deposition.

At the end of the discovery phase in September 2016, Darabont's lawyers stated they were seeking damages of over $280 million; AMC stated they would "vigorously" defend against the lawsuit. Summary judgement statements were completed in July 2017. While waiting for summary judgement, Darabont and the CAA filed a second lawsuit against AMC, based on further evaluation of material from the discovery phase. The second suit contended that AMC purposely manipulated some of its licensing fees that should go to Darabont, such as revenue from digital sales and from overseas markets, and sought an addition US$10 million in damages. Though AMC had initially refused to provide necessary documents for discovery for this new case, AMC did offer to willingly provide them after Darabont's attorneys threatened further legal action during October 2018. By December 2018, the presiding judge ruled against issuing summary judgement in the case, setting up for a jury trial to hear the full case. Due to the retirement of the judge that had overseen the previous cases, a new judge was assigned to the case in February 2019, who joined both the initial 2013 suit and the 2018 suit into a single case, expected to be heard in May 2020. AMC filed a new request for summary judgement of the case in December 2019. The summary judgement was denied, and the jury trial for the case started on February 10, 2020. The judge also denied AMC summary judgement in the second suit for the additional US$10 million in April 2020, determining that should also go to jury.

By July 2021, AMC reported they had settled with Darabont and CAA for $200 million and future royalty payments.

In August 2017, Robert Kirkman, Gale Anne Hurd, Charles Eglee, Glen Mazzara and David Alpert filed similar lawsuits against AMC, citing breach of contract over profits owed to them as a result of AMC's vertical integration. As with Darabont, each had been given a certain percentage of the series's profits based on whether the series was produced by a third party, but when it was transitioned to AMC Studios, their share was dramatically reduced. The Hollywood Reporter estimated that if the four sought similar damages to Darabont's, the lawsuit could be as high as $1 billion. The suits, filed separately in Los Angeles and New York City, were consolidated into a single case heard in a Los Angeles court. Initial hearings over the contractual terms of the "modified adjusted gross receipts" were held in February and March 2020, and the court ruled in July 2020 that AMC had followed the contractual terms in calculating these amounts, giving the network a preliminary victory in the trial. The court issued its final ruling in April 2022, granting summary judgment in favor of AMC, with the judge ruling that there was no contractual language in the plaintiffs' contract dealing with the "modified adjusted gross receipts" and thus there was no actionable claims they could make. Kirkman and the others said that despite the lawsuit, they will continue to work as "partners" with AMC to assure continued success of The Walking Dead and its spinoff series Fear the Walking Dead.

=== Stuntman death ===
During filming of season 8 in July 2017, stuntman John Bernecker was performing a 21-foot drop but ended up missing padded cushions and instead fell onto the concrete floor, sustaining a serious head injury. Though rushed to a hospital, his injuries were too severe and he was taken off life support the next day. AMC and the show's cast and crew expressed remorse for the accident, shutting down production for several days to assist with Bernecker's funeral. The Atlanta Occupational Safety and Health Administration branch launched an investigation of the incident. Bernecker's mother filed a lawsuit in January 2018 against AMC asserting that the production had not taken sufficient precautions to protect Bernecker, including lack of sufficient padding, lack of rehearsal, and not having an ambulance ready to treat his injury. The judge presiding the lawsuit dismissed AMC's claims that it was not responsible since Bernecker was in full control of setting up the stunt, allowing the case to proceed to a jury trial. The trial was held during December 2019, with the jury awarding Bernecker's family US$8.6 million in damages on December 19 after finding that TWD 8, the AMC entity managing production, and the production company Stalwart Films were negligent in Bernecker's death, while clearing AMC itself of any wrongdoing.
