= The Walking Dead: Cold Storage =

- Genre: Post-apocalyptic; Zombie apocalypse Horror; Drama
- Based on: The Walking Dead by: Robert Kirkman; Tony Moore; Charlie Adlard
- Written by: John Esposito
- Directed by: Greg Nicotero
- Starring: Josh Stewart; Daniel Roebuck; Cerina Vincent; Chris Nelson
- Composer: Kevin Blumenfeld
- Country of origin: United States
- Original language: English
- No. of episodes: 4

Production
- Executive producers: Michael Petok; Chris Pollack; Jared Hoffman
- Producer: Sarah J. Donahue
- Production locations: Los Angeles, California
- Cinematography: Michael Fimognari
- Editors: Julius Ramsay; Dan Liu
- Running time: 24:08 minutes (Total)

Original release
- Network: AMC.com
- Release: October 1, 2012

The Walking Dead: Cold Storage is a four-part web series based on the television series The Walking Dead. It aired in its entirety on October 1, 2012, on AMC's official website, two weeks before the premiere of the third season of the show. The web series follows the story of a young man named Chase as he seeks shelter in a storage facility commanded by a malicious employee named B.J. This web series marks a second installment, following The Walking Dead: Torn Apart, which aired a year earlier.

== Synopsis ==
Chase (Josh Stewart) is portrayed as a survivor seeking refuge on a rooftop near Atlanta, Georgia. Despite his intention to reunite with his sister (who is referenced to be in a separate caravan), Chase and companion Harris (Chris Nelson) decide to investigate a nearby storage facility. The two are quickly swarmed by walkers and Harris is killed in the attack, but Chase manages to escape, unharmed, to one of the storage units. It is revealed that the storage units are under the sole command of a former employee named B.J., who is initially hostile to Chase. B.J. changes his mind after Chase offers to restore a damaged basement generator in exchange for one of B.J's box trucks. Chase takes some clothes from a storage unit which also contains family photo albums indicating it belonged to Rick Grimes.

After a nonchalant B.J. fails to mention the presence of walkers in the basement, Chase's suspicions are raised. Chase's suspicions are confirmed when B.J. shows Chase a pile of dead bodies and mercilessly fires a shot at Chase, who collapses into the pile of bodies, apparently dead.

Chase survives the shooting with only a graze to his temple and returns to the compound to take revenge. He inadvertently finds Kelly (a female employee B.J. claimed had called in sick the day "shit hit the fan"), who explains that B.J. murdered the other employees and forced her into sexual slavery. B.J., realizing the situation, confronts Kelly and her liberator, refusing to let Chase leave with her. The events of this standoff culminate in B.J.'s decapitation (presumably by Kelly) while the two survivors escape the compound in a box truck (implied to be low on gas). B.J.'s zombified head is shown on a table watching the surveillance monitors as the compound is overrun by walkers.

== Cast ==
- Josh Stewart as Chase
- Daniel Roebuck as B.J.
- Cerina Vincent as Kelly
- Chris Nelson as Harris

== Crew ==
- Director: Greg Nicotero
- Writer: John Esposito
- Producer: Sarah J. Donahue
- Executive producers: Michael Petok, Chris Pollack, and Jared Hoffman
- Composer: Kevin Blumenfeld
- Cinematography: Jonathan Hall
- Editors: Julius Ramsay and Dan Liu
- Production designer: Brett Snodgrass
- Art direction: Jenna Sanders
- Costume designer: Bonnie Stauch

== Webisodes ==
No.	Title	Directed by	Written by	Original release date	Running time
1	"Hide and Seek"	Greg Nicotero	John Esposito	October 1, 2012	4:29
2	"Keys to the Kingdom"	Greg Nicotero	John Esposito	October 1, 2012	4:57
3	"The Chosen Ones"	Greg Nicotero	John Esposito	October 1, 2012	5:38
4	"Parting Shots"	Greg Nicotero	John Esposito	October 1, 2012	9:04
