= The Walking Dead: The Oath =

- Genre: Zombie Horror
- Written by: Luke Passmore
- Directed by: Greg Nicotero
- Starring: Ellen Greene; Wyatt Russel; Ashley Bell
- Country of origin: United States
- Original language: English
- No. of seasons: 1
- No. of episodes: 3

Production
- Producer: Peter Barnett

Original release
- Network: AMC Global Media
- Release: October 11, 2013

The Walking Dead: The Oath is a 2013 web series serving as a spin off from the The Walking Dead TV series. The show was distributed by AMC Networks and was directed by Greg Nicotero with Luke Passmore as the series writer and Peter Barnett as Producer.

== Plot ==
Explores the early days of the zombie apocalypse. The plot follows lone survivors Paul and Karina as they desperately seek medical help for a life-threatening wound, ultimately taking refuge in an isolated hospital and revealing the origin of the show's iconic "DON'T OPEN DEAD INSIDE" cafeteria doors.

== Cast ==
- Ellen Greene as Gale
- Ashley Bell as Karina
- Wyatt Russell as Paul
- Ruth Wilhoit as Zombie Walker

== Production ==
AMC Networks announced that a new spin-off webseries titled The Oath was in production and set to release ahead of the Walking Dead Season 4 premiere, with Greg Nicotero attached as Director. The Oath also marked the third year that AMC had produced a Walking Dead webseries.

== Release ==
The series aired its first episode on AMC Network on October 1, 2013, with episodes two and three being released the same day. The webseries was also released on the AMC YouTube Channel.

== Reception ==
The Oath received mostly positive reviews. Big Shiny Robot praised the show for its engaging plot, strong character development and terrifying zombie scenes, urging audiences to "Check out the webisodes if you're in need of a Walking Dead appetizer".

Through The Shattered Lens stated "The Oath is a nice webisode series with some average acting from the cast" but praised Luke Passmore's screenplay as being "quite good".

== Episodes ==
No.	Title	Original release date
1	"The Oath: Alone"	October 11, 2013
Karina and Paul escape from an overrun camp, and they arrive at a seemingly safe place, a former hospital that is run by a doctor. The doctor, however, has dark secrets.
2	"The Oath: Choice"	October 11, 2013
Karina and Paul are helped by a doctor, the only survivor of the tragedy that happened in that medical facility. Paul health's deteriorate, and the kind doctor may not be what she seems.
3	"The Oath: Bond"	October 11, 2013
Paul struggle to survive, Karina is offered with a choice. Paul, Karina and Dr. Gale must face the consequences of their choices.
