= The Walking Dead: Torn Apart =

- Genre: Post-apocalyptic; Zombie apocalypse Horror; Drama
- Written by: John Esposito; Greg Nicotero
- Directed by: Greg Nicotero
- Composer: Kevin Blumenfeld
- No. of episodes: 6

Production
- Executive producers: Jared Hoffman; Chris Pollack; Michael Petok
- Producer: Tevin Adelman
- Cinematography: Jonathan Hall
- Running time: 19:35 minutes (total)

Original release
- Network: AMC.com
- Release: October 3, 2011

The Walking Dead: Torn Apart is a six-part web series based on the television series The Walking Dead. It aired in its entirety on October 3, 2011, on AMC's official website.

The web series tells the origin story of Hannah, also known as "Bicycle Girl", the walker whom Rick Grimes killed in the first episode. Rick risks a walker encounter to go back and find Hannah before he sets out for Atlanta. After telling her he is "sorry this happened to you," Rick shoots her in what is clearly a humanitarian gesture, which reveals much about Rick's own character and sets a tone for the rest of season one.

These webisodes were followed by a second set of webisodes, titled Cold Storage, which were released on October 1, 2012.

== Plot ==
Hannah, a mother of two kids, awakens from a car crash to find her two children missing. She runs to her ex's house, and finds them there. Andrew, her ex, had previously shot and hid his walker wife, who comes back and almost kills the two kids before Hannah kills her. In a flashback, it is revealed that after going to his neighbor's house to scavenge supplies, Andrew was asked to shoot his living neighbor, Mike Palmer, who had been bitten. Mike also asked that he shoot his two children upstairs who have already turned, which he neglects to do. Later in a desperate attempt to flee with his family, Andrew tries to get the keys to Mike's truck, but is killed in the process by Mike's undead children he had failed to shoot. A helicopter hovering over the neighborhood announces to any survivors to make their way to the concession stand at the park, where they are evacuating refugees. Hannah and her children leave on foot in an attempt to get there, but Hannah is bitten along the way. After she is bitten, Hannah hands a pistol to her daughter and tells her and her brother to run to safety at the concession stand, and then she is devoured and torn in half by a horde of walkers. The last shot is of her waking up as a walker and then starting to pull herself along the ground.

== Cast ==
- Lilli Birdsell as Hannah
- Rick Otto as Andrew
- Griffin Cleveland as Billy
- Madison Leisle as Jamie
- Rex Linn as Mike Palmer
- Danielle Burgio as Judy

== Webisodes ==
No.	Title	Directed by	Written by	Original release date	Running time
1	"A New Day"	Greg Nicotero	Story by : John Esposito & Greg Nicotero; Teleplay by : John Esposito	October 3, 2011	2:37
2	"Family Matters"	Greg Nicotero	Story by : John Esposito & Greg Nicotero; Teleplay by : John Esposito	October 3, 2011	2:20
3	"Domestic Violence"	Greg Nicotero	Story by : John Esposito & Greg Nicotero; Teleplay by : John Esposito	October 3, 2011	3:10
4	"Neighborly Advice"	Greg Nicotero	Story by : John Esposito & Greg Nicotero; Teleplay by : John Esposito	October 3, 2011	4:00
5	"Step-Mother"	Greg Nicotero	Story by : John Esposito & Greg Nicotero; Teleplay by : John Esposito	October 3, 2011	2:22
6	"Everything Dies"	Greg Nicotero	Story by : John Esposito & Greg Nicotero; Teleplay by : John Esposito	October 3, 2011	5:06
