= Made to Suffer =

- The Walking Dead episode
- The Governor and Michonne have a physical confrontation after she discovers and kills his re-animated daughter, Penny.
- Episode no.: Season 3 Episode 8
- Directed by: Billy Gierhart
- Written by: Robert Kirkman
- Cinematography by: Rohn Schmidt
- Editing by: Nathan D. Gunn
- Original air date: December 2, 2012

Guest appearances
- Emily Kinney as Beth Greene; Lew Temple as Axel; Dallas Roberts as Milton Mamet; Jose Pablo Cantillo as Caesar Martinez; Alexa Nikolas as Haley; Chad L. Coleman as Tyreese Williams; Sonequa Martin-Green as Sasha Williams; Donzaleigh Abernathy as Dr. Stevens; Jon Bernthal as Shane Walsh; Tyler Chase as Ben; Cherie Dvorak as Donna; Daniel Thomas May as Allen; Russell Towery as Guard #1; Vincent Ward as Oscar

Episode chronology
← Previous "When the Dead Come Knocking"	Next → "The Suicide King"
- The Walking Dead season 3

"Made to Suffer" is the eighth episode and mid-season finale of the third season of the post-apocalyptic horror television series The Walking Dead. It was directed by Billy Gierhart and written by Robert Kirkman, and aired on AMC in the United States on December 2, 2012. In this episode, Rick (Andrew Lincoln), Daryl (Norman Reedus), Michonne (Danai Gurira), and Oscar (Vincent Ward) enter Woodbury in search of Glenn (Steven Yeun) and Maggie (Lauren Cohan). Meanwhile, a new group of survivors discover the prison.

This episode marks the first appearances of Tyreese Williams (Chad L. Coleman) and Sasha Williams (Sonequa Martin-Green). It also features a cameo from Jon Bernthal (Shane Walsh).

== Plot ==
Rick, Michonne, Daryl, and Oscar head toward Woodbury to rescue Glenn and Maggie from The Governor. While they are gone, a group of five survivors—siblings Tyreese Williams (Chad L. Coleman) and Sasha Williams (Sonequa Martin-Green), and Allen (Daniel Thomas May) and Donna (Cherie Dvorak) with their son Ben (Tyler Chase)—come across the prison while fleeing a horde of walkers, and discover a breach in its fence. They make their way inside, Donna having been bitten by a walker in her right arm. Their cries for help are heard by Carl, who helps lead them to a safe area of the prison. Donna succumbs to the bite, and after a brief moment of silence, Tyreese smashes her head with a hammer to prevent her re-animating. Carl keeps the newcomers locked in a commons area for safekeeping; Tyreese understands and accepts.

In Woodbury, Rick's group sneaks into a building while at the same time, Glenn and Maggie attempt to escape. The Governor orders Merle and his men to execute them, but as they approach, Maggie stabs one of the men with a sharpened bone, enabling them to slip by. Rick and the others launch their ambush, enabling them to bring Glenn and Maggie to safety; however, Michonne slips away on her own. As they see to Glenn and Maggie while avoiding detection, Glenn reveals to Daryl that his brother Merle is here, and Daryl insists that they go find him. Meanwhile, aware that their attackers include friends of Andrea, The Governor gives his men shoot-to-kill orders, and keeps Andrea away from the action by enforcing the town's curfew.

Michonne makes her way into The Governor's house and discovers a hidden room where he has kept the heads of many former allies, re-animated as walkers, in aquarium tanks, as well as the turned body of his daughter Penny (Kylie Szymanski) chained up. As she is studying the room, The Governor arrives, and despite his pleas to not harm Penny, Michonne kills her. Enraged, the two quickly engage in combat. After smashing the aquariums, Michonne uses a glass shard to stab The Governor in the right eye, but before she can kill him, Andrea arrives and stops Michonne, who turns and flees the building. Andrea races to help bring The Governor to Dr. Stevens to treat his injured right eye.

Rick's group prepares to fight their way out of Woodbury, using smoke bombs to cover their escape. Daryl stays back to cover the others, while Rick is momentarily confused by a man whom he mistakes to be his former ally—Shane Walsh. Oscar is shot and killed as the others scale the Woodbury wall, and Daryl is captured. Rick, Maggie (after shooting Oscar in the head to prevent reanimation), and Glenn regroup with Michonne, who has been waiting for them, and they question if she is still useful to them. In the Woodbury arena, The Governor addresses the town's citizens, declaring that they were attacked by "terrorists". He then accuses Merle of betraying the people of Woodbury and has his men drag Daryl into the arena as proof of Merle's complicity; the residents start chanting for their blood. Stunned, Andrea stares at Daryl as the bloodthirsty townspeople cheer.

== Production ==
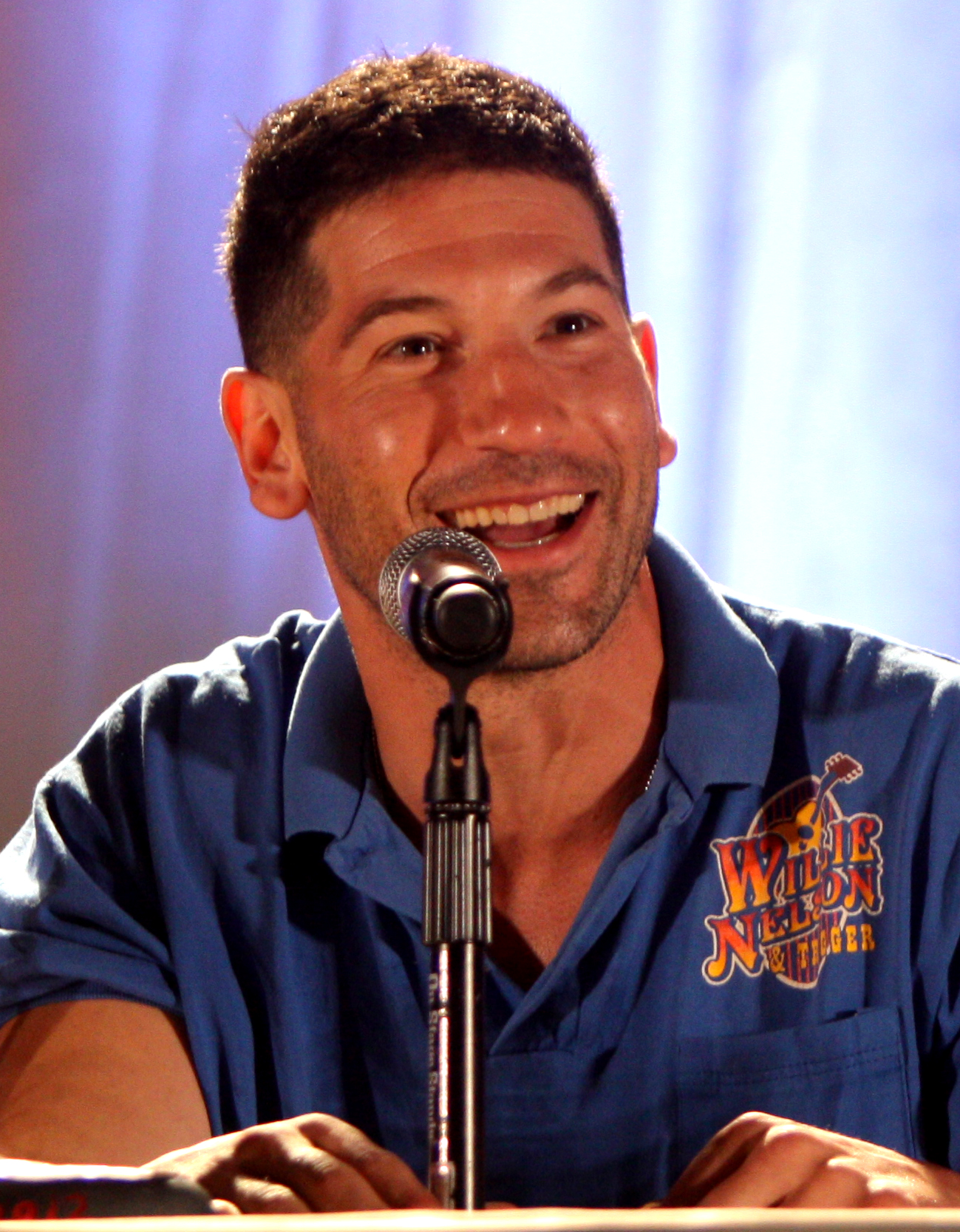
Jon Bernthal makes a cameo appearance as Shane Walsh in this episode.

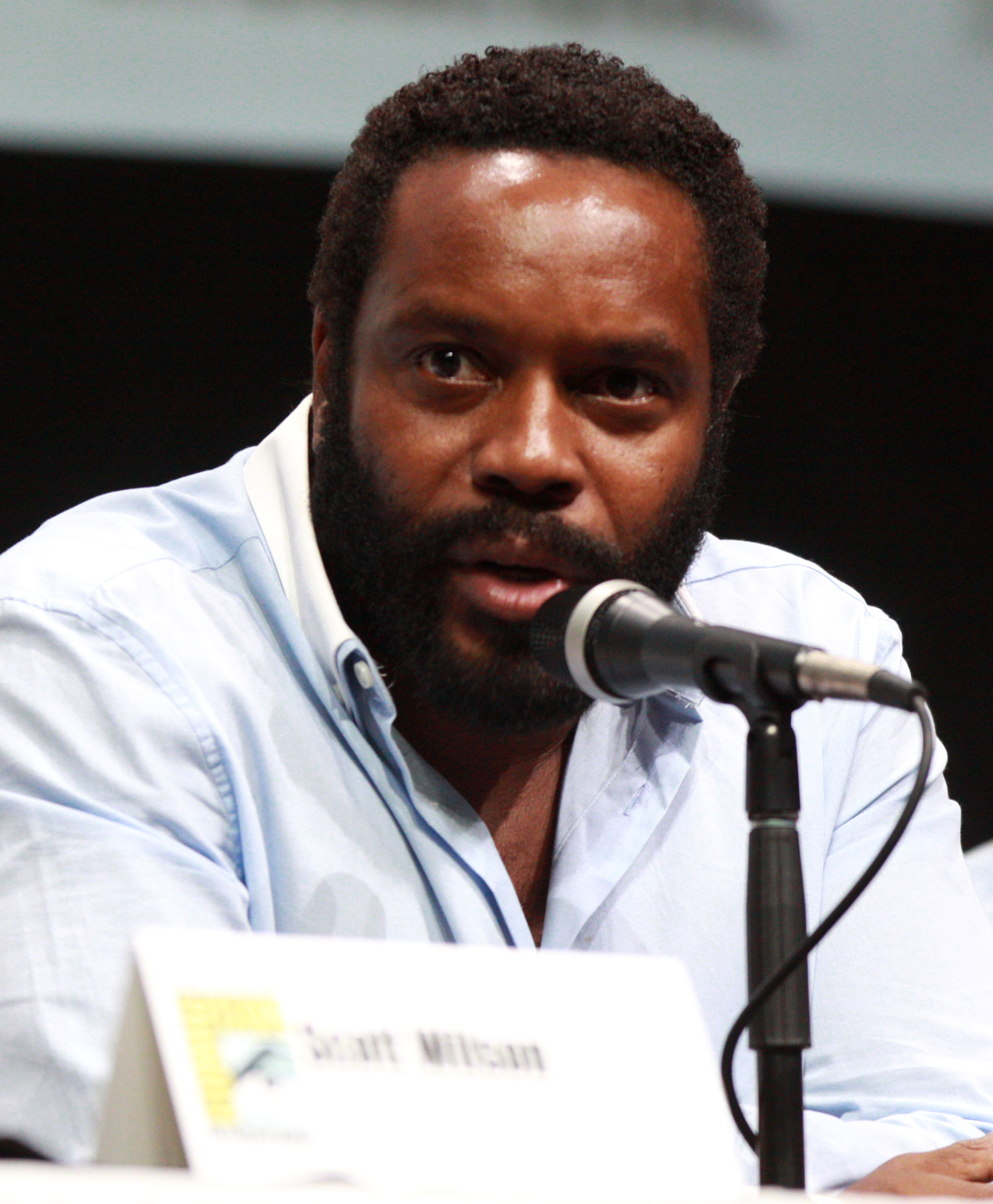
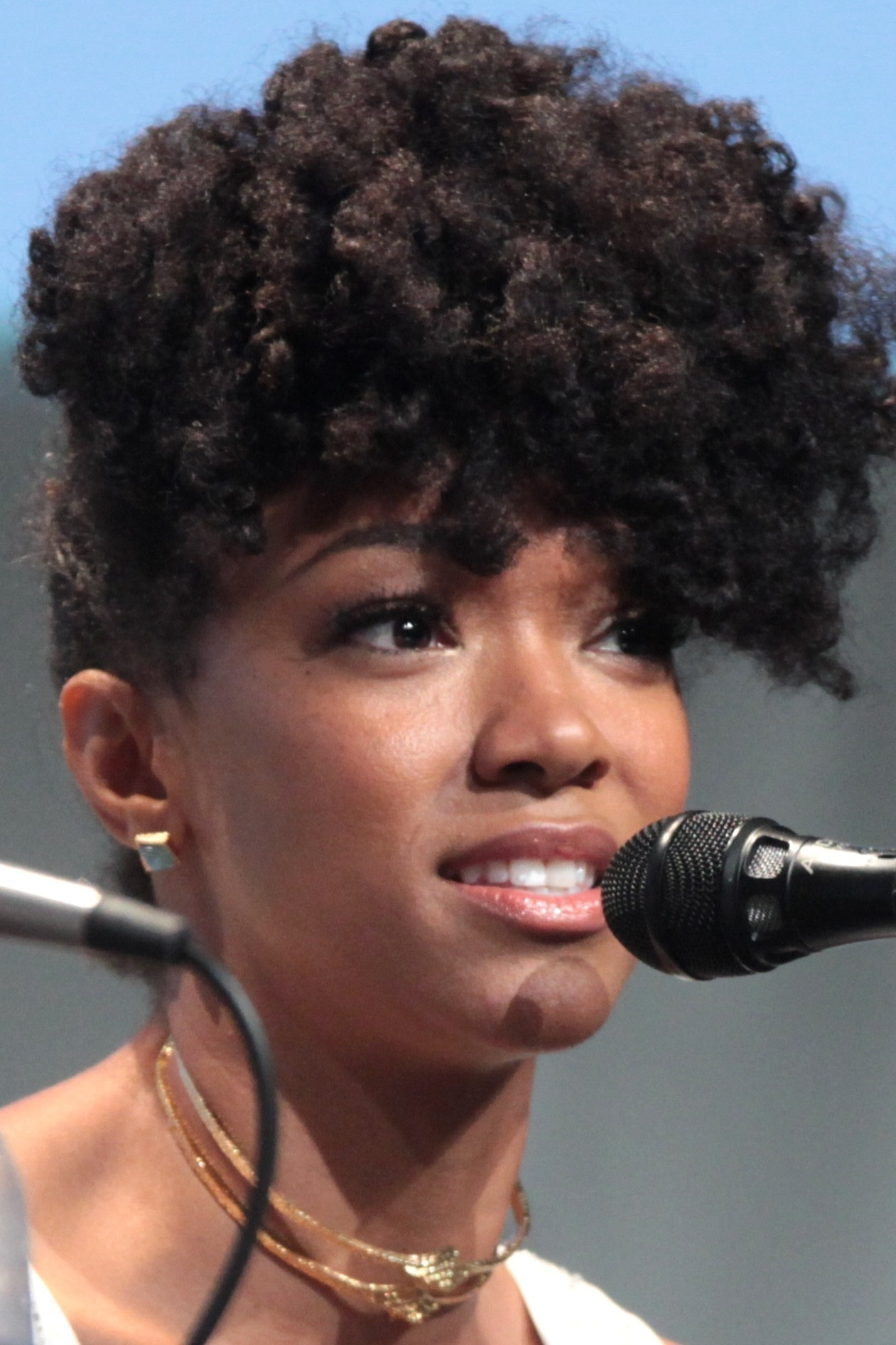
Chad L. Coleman (left) and Sonequa Martin-Green (right) made their first appearances in "Made to Suffer" as Tyreese and Sasha Williams.

Chad L. Coleman was cast as Tyreese in mid 2012. On the auditioning process, Coleman said: "I knew I was auditioning for Tyreese. I got a call that Robert Kirkman had his eye on me since seeing me as Cuddy [sic] from The Wire. He'd been looking at me for a while and I didn't know about it. There was a lot of buzz online about people wanting this character to appear and who should play him — and I was on a lot of those lists. That echoed Kirkman's sentiments and he went to AMC and said, "Chad is Tyreese." They said fine but we have to see other people and Kirkman said, "But it's Chad." He went to bat for me and I was grateful that it all worked out. I eventually auditioned for it with dummy sides. I went in and then had to come back one more time and then that was it. What I remember most about my audition was not having a car and having to take the bus to Raleigh Studios in [Hollywood]. I appreciate Robert for his sticktuitedness and AMC for seeing what he saw — eventually."

In 2012, Sonequa Martin-Green auditioned for the role of Michonne albeit with a pseudonym due to the secrecy of the auditioning process. When Danai Gurira was cast, Martin-Green said she was "the perfect choice." Former showrunner Glen Mazzara still wanted Martin-Green to be a part of the show and decided to give a role specifically for her instead. She was cast in a recurring role on The Walking Dead as Sasha, the sister of Tyreese, an original character, exclusive to the television series. Martin-Green explained: "[Sasha] was supposed to be a recurring character and as we kept going forward, they picked up my option to be a regular. It's very rare and I'm still quite dumbfounded about it but Glen and I hit it off and I still appreciate him. He wanted to work with me and wrote Sasha for me." She was promoted to a series regular for season four. After auditioning for the role of Michonne, she read the first three volumes of the graphic novels in preparation for the television series. Knowing they were similar, she chose not to continue reading the comic book series to avoid being aware of future storylines that may occur on the television series.

== Reception ==
=== Critical response ===
The episode was reviewed positively by most critics. Zack Handlen, writing for The A.V. Club, rated the episode B+ on an A to F scale.

Eric Goldman at IGN gave the episode 9.3 out of 10, saying "this was another great episode for The Walking Dead and a strong end to this half of the season. In Season 3, The Walking Dead has turned into a show that is perhaps less grounded and “realistic”—in the midst of its genre scenario—than it once felt, but this is easily the most entertaining and exciting that it’s been for a prolonged period".

Forbes magazine's Erik Kain said it was "a strong episode overall, even if the addition of new characters was a bit much to pack into the hour". Time journalist Nate Rawlings felt that "Made to Suffer" was a great work of Glen Mazzara's crew, whose "greatest feat" for this season is in bringing the different stories of Woodbury and the prison together through the brothers Merle and Daryl finding each other "on opposite sides of a war—a story as old as stories themselves," thus propelling the audience to "an amazing climax to end to the first half of this season."

Funeralwise.com found that The Walking Dead was the most violent show on TV in the fall of 2012, with 308 dead (or undead) bodies shown in the eight episodes aired of the show's third season.

=== Ratings ===
Upon its initial broadcast on December 2, 2012, "Made to Suffer" was watched by estimated 10.48 million viewers, up slightly from the previous episode.
