= Welcome to the Tombs =

- The Walking Dead episode
- The remaining citizens of Woodbury are brought back to the prison after Andrea opts to kill herself.
- Episode no.: Season 3 Episode 16
- Directed by: Ernest Dickerson
- Written by: Glen Mazzara
- Cinematography by: Rohn Schmidt
- Editing by: Hunter M. Via
- Original air date: March 31, 2013

Guest appearances
- Emily Kinney as Beth Greene; Jose Pablo Cantillo as Caesar Martinez; Chad L. Coleman as Tyreese; Sonequa Martin-Green as Sasha Williams; Melissa Ponzio as Karen; Tanner Holland as Jody; Travis Love as Shumpert; Daniel Thomas May as Allen; E. Roger Mitchell as Paul

Episode chronology
← Previous "This Sorrowful Life"	Next → "30 Days Without an Accident"
- The Walking Dead season 3

"Welcome to the Tombs" is the sixteenth and final episode of the third season of the post-apocalyptic horror television series The Walking Dead, which aired on AMC on March 31, 2013. In the episode, The Governor (David Morrissey) and Rick Grimes (Andrew Lincoln) prepare for the upcoming assault on the prison. Tyreese (Chad L. Coleman) and Sasha (Sonequa Martin-Green) decide to not participate in the assault and stay on guard duty before preparing to leave, as the citizens of Woodbury become increasingly alarmed at The Governor's erratic behaviour. Meanwhile, Andrea (Laurie Holden) struggles to escape The Governor's torture chamber.

This episode was directed by Ernest Dickerson and written by Glen Mazzara. However, the scenes involving Andrea were re-written by Scott M. Gimple and re-filmed one month after production ended to deliver a more satisfying conclusion. The episode also explores the theme of embracing humanity and civilization.

Commentators gave a mixed response towards the episode, with some praising the atmosphere and theme of the episode as well as the arc of the season, while others criticized the lack of conclusion towards The Governor's story and Andrea's death. The finale was watched by 12.42 million viewers upon its original airing, which (before the fourth season premiere) was the show's most-watched episode.

The episode features the final appearance of Andrea Harrison until the season 10 episode "What We Become." The episode also marks the final appearance of Milton Mamet (Dallas Roberts), and the final regular appearance of Lori Grimes (Sarah Wayne Callies).

== Plot ==
At Woodbury, The Governor beats up Milton for betraying him by burning the walker pits. The Governor drags Milton to the torture room where Andrea is still handcuffed to a dental chair. The Governor offers Milton a knife and tells him he can get back into his good graces by killing Andrea, but Milton instead tries to kill The Governor. The Governor grabs the knife and stabs Milton several times, fatally wounding him. He leaves Milton to die, knowing that he will reanimate soon, and tells Andrea that "in this life now, you kill or you die. Or you die and you kill.” The Governor then goes to join the army of men ready to attack the prison. Tyreese informs The Governor that he and Sasha will stay behind to protect the citizens of Woodbury, as they only kill walkers, not humans. The Governor, after a moment, agrees and gives Tyreese a gun, and thanks him.

At the prison, Rick and his group pack up supplies in cars. Rick is still having hallucinations of Lori, making him question his judgement. Michonne finds Rick and forgives him for his decision to try to turn her over to The Governor, and thanks him for his decision to bring her into the group. Rick admits it was Carl's choice, believing she belonged here. Elsewhere, Daryl talks to Carol about his grief of losing his brother Merle. She reminds him that Merle gave them a chance against The Governor.

Later, a small army from Woodbury arrives at the prison. They use their heavy weapons to break through the outer walls and breach the fences with their vehicles. Except for walkers, the prison appears empty. As they search the cell blocks they find a Bible left by Hershel open to a highlighted passage John 5:29, "And shall come forth: they that have done good, unto the resurrection of life; and they that have done evil, unto the resurrection of damnation." The Governor angrily tosses the book aside and orders his men to search "the tombs", the maze of hallways within the prison. However, Rick and the others are hiding in the tombs, and ambush The Governor and his men who flee in a confused panic. The Woodbury army retreats from the prison, ignoring The Governor's orders to hold their ground and attack. A young man from the Woodbury group escapes on foot and runs into Carl and Hershel who were waiting out the attack in the woods on the perimeter of the prison. Hershel and Carl hold the man at gunpoint, and Hershel demands the young man hand over his weapon. As he slowly complies with Hershel's demand, Carl unexpectedly and deliberately shoots the man.

In Woodbury, Tyreese warns Sasha they may need to slip away before The Governor's return. Milton tries to retain consciousness long enough to help Andrea escape, and tells her he left a pair of pliers on the floor behind her she can use to break the handcuffs restraining her to the chair. Andrea reaches back with her right foot and tries to pull the pliers forward.

Some distance from the prison, The Governor catches up to the fleeing convoy and orders them to return to the prison. When they insist on returning to Woodbury, The Governor proceeds to kill them all, including Allen. He only leaves alive his lieutenants Martinez and Shumpert, though he is unaware Karen has hidden herself under the bodies to avoid being killed. The Governor, Martinez, and Shumpert drive off.

In the prison, Hershel tells Rick about Carl's execution of the surrendering Woodbury man, and explains in no uncertain terms Carl "gunned that kid down." Rick, Michonne, and Daryl leave to chase down The Governor, fearing he may attack again, while the others guard the prison. The three discover the Woodbury convoy and find Karen hiding in a truck, who explains what happened. They continue to Woodbury and engage in a firefight with Tyreese and Sasha, until Karen speaks up and explains what she saw. Tyreese allows the group to come in and Rick tells them that Andrea never returned to the prison.

The group quickly searches Woodbury and find the torture room. They find Milton dead, but it quickly becomes clear Milton re-animated and bit Andrea before she could kill his re-animated body, presumably by stabbing him through the brain with the pliers. Rick, Michonne and Daryl sit with Andrea and grapple briefly with her impending turn from Milton's bite. Rick tells her everyone is safe at the prison and Andrea is glad that Michonne has found Rick's group. Andrea insists she kill herself, and in an effort to reconcile her decision to stay with the Governor tells Rick "I just didn't want anyone else to die." Rick puts his revolver in her hand, and waits in the hallway with Daryl. Michonne refuses to leave Andrea, and while Rick and Daryl wait somberly in the hall, Andrea shoots herself behind the closed door of the torture room.

Rick's group returns to the prison with Andrea's body to give her a proper burial. They are followed by a school bus of the remaining Woodbury residents, including Tyreese and Sasha. "They're gonna join us," Rick tells Carl. Rick looks up at the prison catwalk where Lori previously appeared as a hallucination and sees she is no longer there.

== Production ==
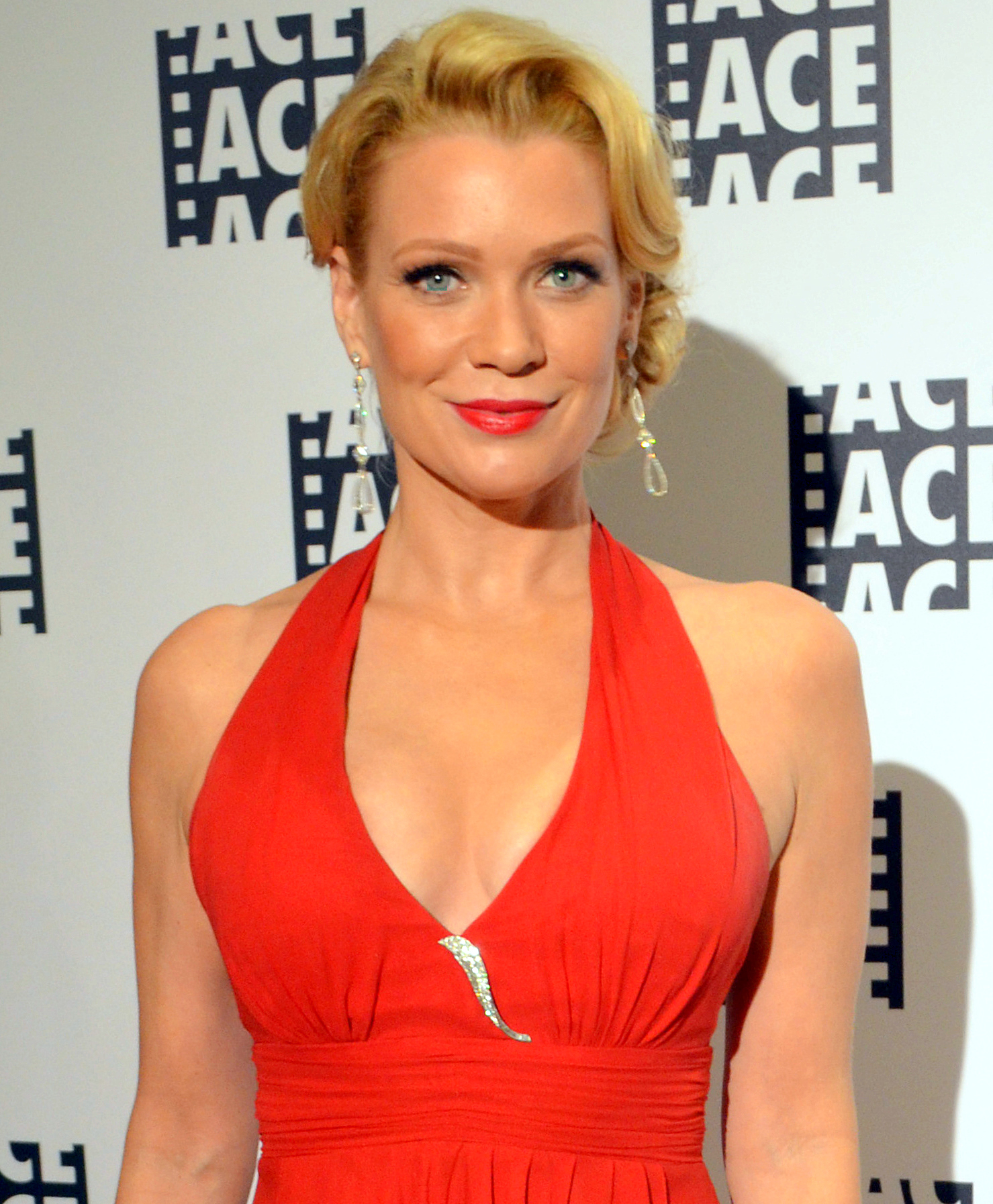
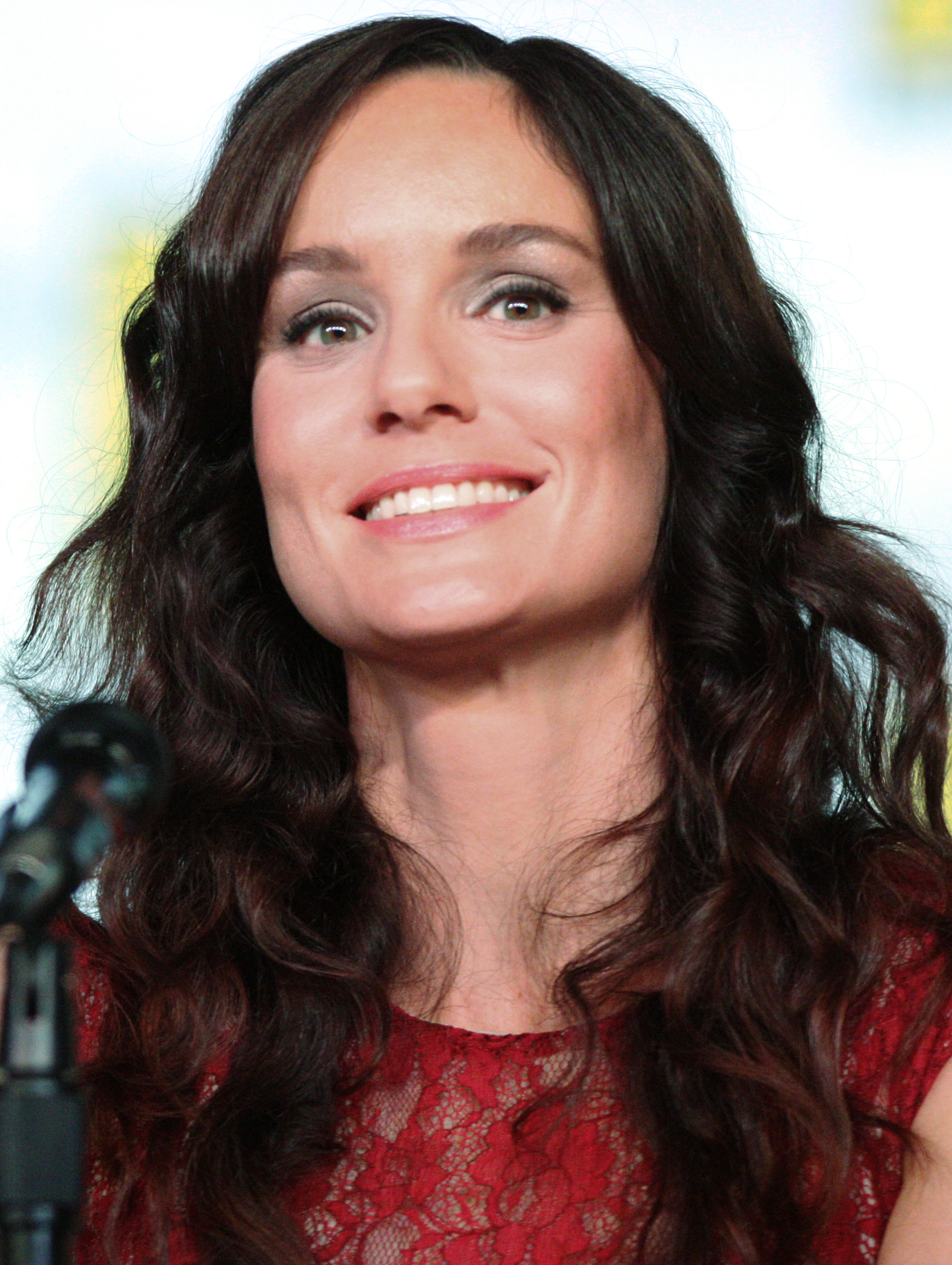
"Welcome to the Tombs" marked the last appearance of Laurie Holden (left) (Andrea) and Sarah Wayne Callies (right) Lori Grimes as part of the main cast.

"Welcome to the Tombs" was directed by Ernest Dickerson, and written by showrunner and executive producer Glen Mazzara. However, the scenes involving Andrea were re-written by Scott M. Gimple. It features the last overall and credited appearances of Sarah Wayne Callies as Lori Grimes (via hallucination) and Laurie Holden as Andrea. Callies' character was killed off in the fourth episode of the season, "Killer Within", although she made sporadic appearances across the season while remaining credited in every episode due to her role in Rick's arc. Although credited, Michael Rooker (Merle Dixon) is the only member of season three's ten main cast members to not appear in the episode.

The death of Andrea is featured within the episode, marking one of the biggest departures from Robert Kirkman's source material in which Andrea still plays an active role throughout the series. This episode also marks the final appearance of recurring actor Dallas Roberts, who portrays Milton. In an interview published March 31, 2013, TVLine asked Holden how long in advance she knew about her character Andrea's death. Holden replied, "I didn’t get the official word until a few days before we began [shooting] the finale. It was a shock to everyone. It was never part of the original story docs for season three. And it was rather unexpected." Kirkman said: "The comics still exist and I'd urge those people to continue reading the comics where Andrea is still alive. Just know the show is something different and we are telling different stories. It doesn't mean we're not going to see a lot of the big stories and big events from the comic book in the TV show eventually; it just means those things will be a little bit altered from time to time. Hopefully it will be exciting, new and fresh just like it was the first time you read the comic, which is really the goal." Kirkman also said: "It's something that was debated quite a bit. There was a lot of opposition in the writers' room. I bounced back and forth between 'We really shouldn’t kill her' and 'this is a good idea.' In the end it all came together and we decided to go for it. It was definitely something that divided the room to a certain extent."

Holden expressed desires of wanting to continue Andrea's story but she was grateful for the end result: "Do I wish we could’ve seen and explored more of the comic-book-Robert-Kirkman Andrea? Yes. Absolutely. Do I wish that I had more scenes with Michonne showing that friendship? Yes. Absolutely. But at the end of the day, I don’t think I could ask for a better death. I feel like her life mattered, and she died trying, and her heart was in the right place. I feel grateful for that. You can’t have it all."

Glen Mazzara said the decision to kill off Andrea occurred organically throughout the season and talks of it emerged half-way through. He also addressed that he never planned to faithfully follow the comic book source material anyway, regarding the negative feedback from comic book readers. On the significance of Andrea's death, he said:

I thought it was important that we always show that no one is safe. It's also important to show the effect that these deaths have on our other characters. Andrea's death, for example, I knew Rick was going to finally open up the gates of the prison after a season in which he's trying to hide away from the world and lock everybody away and keep them safe. He realizes what that means -- that our group is now becoming isolated and will be picked off, that his own son is on the road to becoming the Governor (David Morrissey), so he has to open up the gates and let other people in and be compassionate. At the end of the finale, he brings in these women, children and elderly people and the group is going to transform. There needed to be a blood sacrifice for that, and there had to be a price that was paid. Andrea paying that price was important. She is unable to re-enter the group. In a way, a lot of what she did was to bring the two groups together. But she's never able to enter the prison and be reunited in a full way with Rick's group. That was an ultimate sacrifice that was worthy of the season finale.

=== Writing and re-shoots ===
Milton and Andrea's death scenes differ significantly from what was originally taped. Dallas Roberts and the scene's other actors had to fly back to the set to shoot the altered scene written by Scott M. Gimple. As Roberts told Entertainment Weekly:

"Originally, the beating scene that started the episode wasn’t there. Originally, I showed up and was led into the room where Andrea was and I took the tools out – the instruments of torture that were laid on the table — and then he shot me in the stomach, completely unexpectedly. And then I was left to bleed out in the same idea basically — you’re going to kill her now. There was a lot more of Milton trying to open the door and him trying to free her from the chains. And then there was a section where he was going to wrap the chain around the neck and try to choke her to death before he turned so she wouldn’t have to deal with Walker Milton, or Biter Milton, as it were.

"And then at the end of that, it was just Tyreese and [Sasha] who found her. Rick and Daryl and Michonne weren’t there. So it was essentially the same idea, except you saw me taking chunks out of Laurie Holden in that version. And then they called us back a few months later to reshoot it and made all those changes. So now you’re not sure if I’ve gotten her until after that door opens, and I think that’s probably why they did it."

In 2014, at Walker Stalker Con Chicago, Greg Nicotero and Laurie Holden discussed in depth the death of Andrea. They revealed there were three different versions of the script. One version included Andrea surviving the season finale and saving the people of Woodbury, leading them back to the prison. The other was the one that was written by Glen Mazzara and the aired one re-written partially by Scott M. Gimple. Holden felt that re-shooting her original death scene two months later was satisfying, because "she needed to be with her friends" and felt that she died with "grace" in the re-shoot as opposed to a "D-movie horror death" in the original run. Holden also revealed that the decision caused Mazzara to lose his job as showrunner, as many of the writers were against the concept. Nicotero felt that Andrea's character got "lost in the writing" for the third season.

== Reception ==
=== Critical response ===
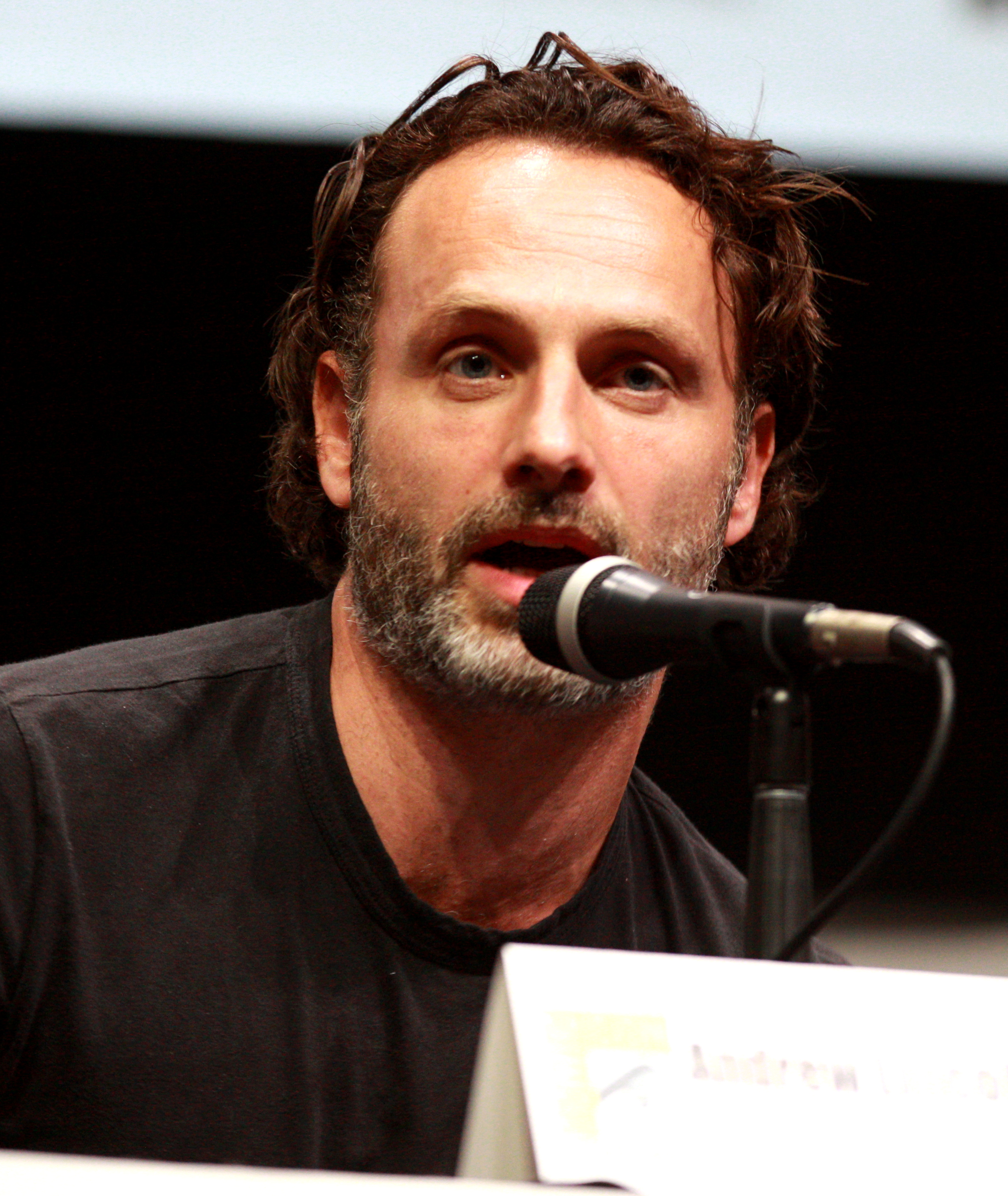
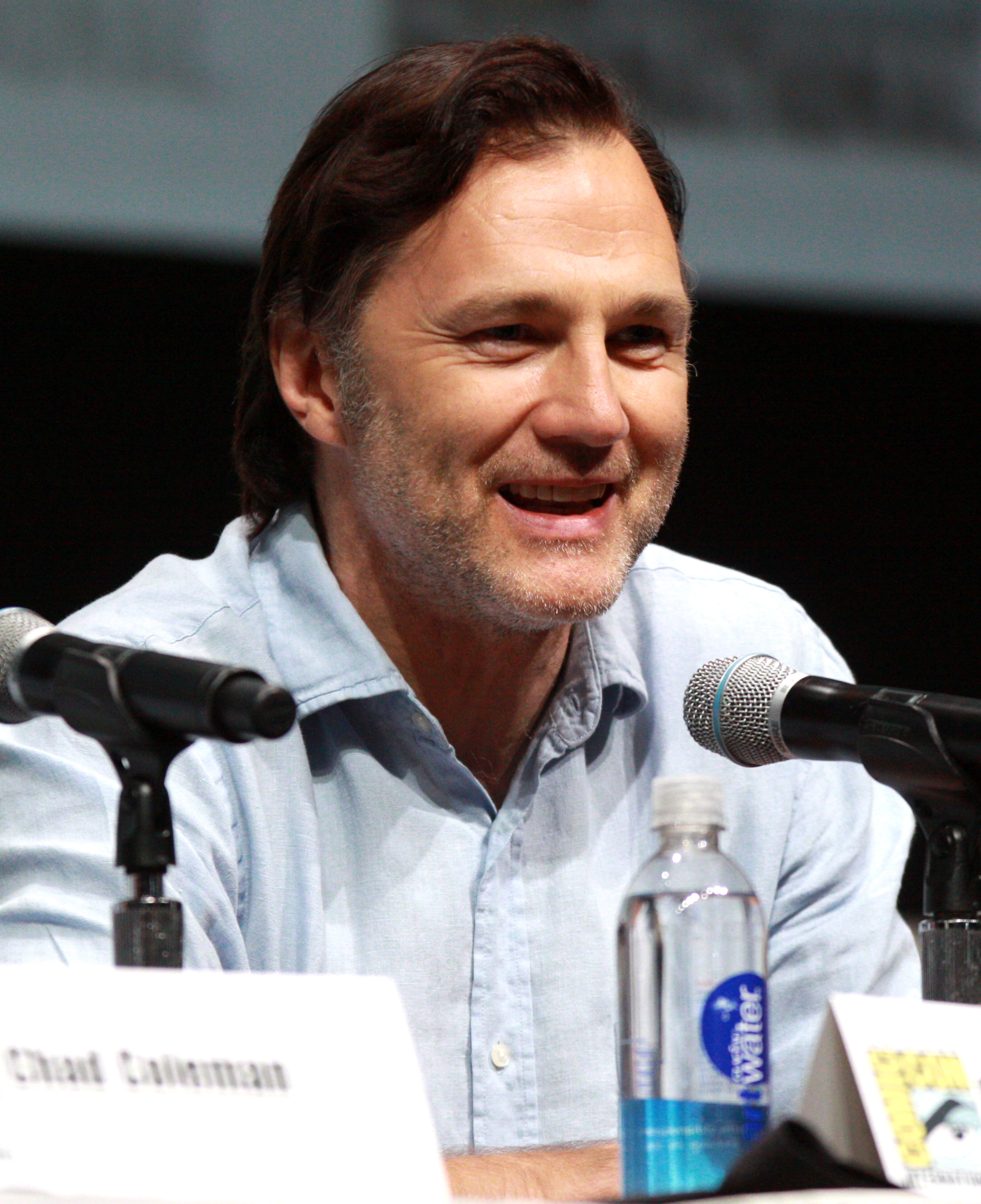
Andrew Lincoln (left) and David Morrissey (right) both received critical acclaim for their performances.

The episode received mixed reviews from critics, mainly due to the disappointing prison assault. Zack Handlen, writing for The A.V. Club, rated the episode B+ on an A to F scale and said, "It wasn’t a perfect hour, and once again, there are characters behaving in ways that should’ve been better established over the course of the entire season, rather than just randomly getting pulled out of a hat in the last hour. But it still holds together, and it makes the arc of the season seem cleaner in retrospect." Erik Kain of Forbes felt that although the episode had "many great moments", it was overall a disappointing finale, in part because "the show took the easy way out and didn't give us what it's promised." Josh Jackson, writing for Paste, reviewed the episode more positively with a score of 9.3/10, commenting on the theme of "humanity when civilization has crumbled" and how this relates to several characters throughout the show's history and was highlighted again with the characters of Rick, Carl, and The Governor in this episode IGN writer Eric Goldman gave a "good" review – a score of 7.3/10 – praising the prison group's trap and ambush in the beginning of the episode as well as the interesting questions Carl's actions provoke. However, he felt that resting the episode's dramatic conclusion entirely on Andrea's death was ultimately unsatisfying and liked the fact that The Governor survived.

=== Ratings ===
The original broadcast, on March 31, 2013, was watched by an estimated 12.4 million viewers, an increase from the previous episode, to become the most-watched episode of the season and of the series, until it was surpassed again by season four premiere with 16.1 million viewers.
