= Arrow on the Doorpost =

- The Walking Dead episode
- Rick and The Governor discuss the futures of both Woodbury and the prison.
- Episode no.: Season 3 Episode 13
- Directed by: David Boyd
- Written by: Ryan C. Coleman
- Cinematography by: Rohn Schmidt
- Editing by: Hunter M. Via
- Original air date: March 10, 2013

Guest appearances
- Emily Kinney as Beth Greene; Dallas Roberts as Milton Mamet; Jose Pablo Cantillo as Caesar Martinez

Episode chronology
← Previous "Clear"	Next → "Prey"
- The Walking Dead season 3

"Arrow on the Doorpost" is the thirteenth episode of the third season of the post-apocalyptic horror television series The Walking Dead. It originally aired on AMC in the United States on March 10, 2013. In this episode, Rick Grimes (Andrew Lincoln) and The Governor (David Morrissey) meet face-to-face, ostensibly to make a peaceful resolution to prevent further bloodshed.

The episode received generally positive reviews from critics; and was watched by 11.46 million viewers, presenting a slight rise in ratings from the previous episode.

== Plot ==
In an attempt to stop further bloodshed, Rick meets and negotiates with The Governor in a feed store, who shows himself to be unarmed but secretly has a pistol taped underneath the table. Both men have brought their respective support, as outside Daryl and Hershel meet with Martinez and Milton. The initially hostile groups begin to socialize with each other, as Daryl and Martinez kill walkers together and Milton examines Hershel's leg.

Having apparently brokered the summit, Andrea enters the barn to join the discussion. Rick reveals his plan of a clear territorial division with a river as a border, but The Governor refuses and is present only to accept the "surrender" of Rick's group. The Governor dismisses Andrea, as does Rick, so they can talk further. Outside, Hershel confirms to Andrea that The Governor abused Maggie, before offering her the chance to come back to their group, though it will mean permanently.

Back at the prison, Merle wants revenge and is fearful for his brother. He argues to preemptively attack The Governor at the meeting, but the others are committed to obeying Rick's orders and stay put, fearful of potential casualties.

In the meeting, The Governor blames Merle for his own atrocities. He reveals that he has surveillance on Rick's group and warns that Woodbury has superior manpower and firepower. Eventually The Governor offers whiskey and relates his sympathetic story about his wife's death, to which Rick drinks. However, Rick expresses some skepticism, though The Governor then reveals one final offer: Rick must hand over Michonne, or have his whole group annihilated. The Governor gives him two days to decide and meet.

Both groups depart after the meeting and though reluctant, Andrea chooses to go with The Governor and his group. The Governor returns to Woodbury and secretly orders Martinez to set an ambush at the feed store, to bring Michonne back alive, and to kill Rick and any of his people who show up to the meeting. Milton takes exception to the ruthlessness of the plan but does not press the issue, while The Governor keeps the agreement terms from Andrea.

At the prison, Rick tells the group that The Governor wants them all dead and that they are going to war. He privately confides to Hershel the true terms of the agreement but, while knowing The Governor would kill them all anyway, he must consider the possibility it would not happen and if safety for the prison can be guaranteed in exchange for one member.

== Production ==
"Arrow on the Doorpost" was written by Ryan C. Coleman, who serves as an assistant to showrunner and executive producer Glen Mazzara on the series. The episode was directed by David Boyd, who was the director of photography on the series during the first two seasons; he previously directed the second-season episode "Secrets".

The episode was originally titled "Pale Horse". Writes TV critic Keven Skinner: "Speaking of the episode name – I didn't get it. I wish showrunner Glen Mazzara had stuck with 'Pale Horse' and kept the original scene with Daryl finding a headless rider on a living horse which tied into the episode title."

== Reception ==
=== Critical response ===
Zack Handlen, writing for The A.V. Club, rated the episode B on an A to F scale, commenting "It’s better than the two episodes before “Clear,” and it brings Rick and the Governor together for their first (and probably last) face to face conversation. In a sense, this is a different kind of stalling, but it's a much more interesting way to hold off a big battle than to just have people wander around aimlessly with occasional yelling." Eric Goldman at IGN gave the episode 8 out of 10, saying he enjoyed the interactions between Rick and The Governor, and praised David Morrissey's monologue.

=== Ratings ===
The original broadcast, on March 10, 2013, was watched by an estimated 11.46 million viewers, an increase in viewership from the previous episode.
