= Prey (The Walking Dead) =

- The Walking Dead episode
- Andrea hides from The Governor in an abandoned factory.
- Episode no.: Season 3 Episode 14
- Directed by: Stefan Schwartz
- Written by: Glen Mazzara; Evan Reilly
- Cinematography by: Rohn Schmidt
- Editing by: Julius Ramsay
- Original air date: March 17, 2013

Guest appearances
- Dallas Roberts as Milton Mamet; Chad L. Coleman as Tyreese Williams; Sonequa Martin-Green as Sasha Williams; Jose Pablo Cantillo as Caesar Martinez; Tyler Chase as Ben; Travis Love as Shumpert; Daniel Thomas May as Allen

Episode chronology
← Previous "Arrow on the Doorpost"	Next → "This Sorrowful Life"
- The Walking Dead season 3

"Prey" is the fourteenth episode of the third season of the post-apocalyptic horror television series The Walking Dead, which originally aired on AMC in the United States on March 17, 2013. In this episode, The Governor (David Morrissey) hunts down Andrea (Laurie Holden) when she flees Woodbury, and tensions arise within Tyreese (Chad L. Coleman)'s group. Meanwhile, a traitor attempts to sabotage the upcoming meeting between Rick (Andrew Lincoln) and The Governor.

The episode was met with generally positive reviews, and was watched by 10.84 million viewers upon its original airing.

== Plot ==
The episode cold opens with a flashback to Andrea and Michonne on their own. Andrea asks if she knew Michonne's chained walkers before they turned, but she states they weren't human in the first place.

In the present The Governor is preparing a cell for Michonne at Woodbury, complete with a dental chair and a number of tools to inflict torture. Milton warns Andrea that the Governor has reneged on the deal with Rick's group at the prison, and plans to kill them all and capture Michonne. Andrea considers assassinating the Governor, but Milton knows that his second-in-command, Martinez, will follow through on the Governor's plans. Instead, Milton urges Andrea to escape and warn Rick and the others. Andrea agrees but cannot convince Milton to come, and challenges him to stop looking the other way from the Governor's immoral actions.

The Governor, Martinez, and others prepare to set off for the prison under pretense of following on the deal. Andrea wishes to come along, but Martinez confiscates all but her knife. The Governor insists that this is to keep her safe and separate from their operation until they meet with Rick. Andrea does not buy this, and sneaks out over the Woodbury wall guarded by Tyreese and Sasha. Tyreese tries to stop her, but Andrea warns him off with the knife and cautions him the Governor is planning terrible things. Tyreese and Sasha report Andrea has forced her way out (but not her specific reasons) to the Governor, who claims this was from Andrea being alone prior to coming to Woodbury and becoming paranoid. After lambasting Milton for encouraging Andrea to leave, the Governor sets out on his own to find her.

Andrea keeps ahead of the Woodbury search team while avoiding walkers. She soon finds that the Governor is close behind her, and she ducks inside an abandoned factory to hide. The Governor tracks her down, but she manages to set several walkers on him as she escapes. She finally nears the prison, seeing Rick outside, and is about to wave to him, when the Governor, having escaped the factory, grabs her from behind and silences her. Rick, who has been suffering hallucinations of dead companions, believes this was yet another such incident.

While the Governor tracks Andrea, Martinez takes Tyreese, Sasha, and Allen to the Biter Pits to collect captive walkers they will use in the attack. Tyreese refuses to help, and Allen criticizes him for not accepting the Governor's ways. Tyreese grabs Allen and holds him over a Biter Pit, reminding him that Allen's late wife Donna had looked to Tyreese for protection over Allen. Sasha talks Tyreese into letting Allen go safely.

The next day, Martinez finds that the Biter Pits have been set ablaze, incinerating the walkers, and he presumes Tyreese committed the act. The Governor returns to Woodbury and, with his usual charm, addresses Tyreese and Sasha's concerns (about feeding people to walkers and killing women and children) by telling them he's using the biters as a scare tactic, a bluff to try to save lives. Tyreese's surprised reaction, when The Governor asks how he got gasoline to burn the biters, suggests his innocence. Milton's mentioning the burning of the walkers to The Governor and the latter's reaction imply The Governor now suspects Milton. When Milton asks The Governor if Andrea is dead, he states, "I hope not." In the final scene she is shown, bound and gagged, in the dental chair in The Governor's workshop.

== Production ==
"Prey" was directed by Stefan Schwartz and written by showrunner Glen Mazzara and by Evan Reilly. The episode was originally titled "Killer Within: Part II".

The song at the end was by the band Voxhaul Broadcast called "You Are the Wilderness".

== Reception ==
=== Critical response ===
Zack Handlen, writing for The A.V. Club, rated the episode B+ on an A to F scale, commenting it "isn’t an amazing hour of television, but it’s fundamentally sound in a way this show often struggles with" and stating it has "a definite sense of purpose, and a main storyline with a beginning, a middle, and an unsettling end." Eric Goldman at IGN gave the episode 8.4 out of 10, calling it an "effective" episode, and wrote he enjoyed the scenes in which The Governor hunts Andrea, that play out "like a horror/thriller story". He also enjoyed the fact that several supporting characters were fleshed out more, such as Tyreese, Sasha and Milton, but he felt the flashback at the beginning of the episode was oddly placed.

=== Ratings ===
The original broadcast, on March 17, 2013, was watched by an estimated 10.84 million viewers, a decrease in viewership from the previous episode.
