= When the Dead Come Knocking =

- The Walking Dead episode
- Carol excitedly reunites with the group, moments before learning of Lori's death.
- Episode no.: Season 3 Episode 7
- Directed by: Dan Sackheim
- Written by: Frank Renzulli
- Cinematography by: Rohn Schmidt
- Editing by: Hunter M. Via
- Original air date: November 25, 2012

Guest appearances
- Emily Kinney as Beth Greene; Lew Temple as Axel; Dallas Roberts as Milton Mamet; Jose Pablo Cantillo as Caesar Martinez; Peter Kulas as Michael Coleman; Alex Van as Hermit; Vincent M. Ward as Oscar

Episode chronology
← Previous "Hounded"	Next → "Made to Suffer"
- The Walking Dead season 3

"When the Dead Come Knocking" is the seventh episode of the third season of the postapocalyptic horror television series The Walking Dead. It was directed by Dan Sackheim and written by Frank Renzulli, and originally aired on AMC in the United States on November 25, 2012.

== Plot ==
At the prison, Rick and Carl observe Michonne, who remains at the prison fence with infant formula and other supplies collected by Glenn and Maggie, the walker guts she is covered in keeping her undetected by the walkers that roam outside the prison. As they debate, they notice the walkers starting to turn toward Michonne and due to being shot in the left leg earlier by Merle, she stumbles as she tries to defend herself. Rick and Carl quickly stop the walkers and bring her inside, locking her in a cell near their cell block and taking away her katana. Michonne refuses to talk when they ask her questions. When they see the supplies that she had brought, they know she is aware there was a newborn at the prison, and both Rick and Daryl threaten her. She explains she had overheard Maggie and Glenn before they were taken to Woodbury by the man who shot her, though she does not reveal either Merle or Andrea's names while describing the town. Rick determines that they need to rescue Glenn and Maggie, and Michonne offers that she can help get them into the town. Rick asks for volunteers, and while many offer, Rick decides to limit the group to himself, Daryl, Michonne, and Oscar. As they arm themselves from the prison's supply and prepare to leave, Rick thanks Daryl for taking charge of the group while he struggled with the loss of his wife Lori, and agrees with Carl's name for the newborn, Judith, borrowed from one of his teachers.

In Woodbury, Merle reminds Glenn how he left him to die in Atlanta. Merle first threatens to harm Maggie to coerce him to talk, and then turns to violence by beating Glenn up in retaliation for headbutting him in his broken nose. Glenn stays quiet, though he states that a large battle-hardened group will come to rescue him. When pressed for names, Glenn iterates several, including Andrea's name, unaware that Andrea is safe within Woodbury. Merle realizes Glenn is lying, and locks a walker in the room with Glenn while he is still tied to a chair. Glenn manages to fend off and kill the walker while breaking free of his restraints. Separately the Governor interrogates Maggie, and when she refuses to talk, he makes her take off her shirt and bra, threatening to rape her. Maggie remains silent and refuses to cooperate, even as the Governor threatens to harm Glenn, and he leaves her alone. The Governor then brings the two of them together, and threatens to kill Glenn in front of Maggie. Maggie finally relents, revealing that they come from a small group at the nearby prison. Leaving the two alone, the Governor and Merle are surprised that a group so small could take a prison that deep in the dangerous Red Zone. The Governor becomes nervous that he is still being lied to, and begins to question Merle's loyalty to him, though he asserts he is still loyal to Woodbury. The Governor assigns Merle and Martinez to scout the prison to verify Maggie's information.

Elsewhere in Woodbury, Andrea continues her affair with the Governor, and to avoid informing her of Maggie and Glenn's capture, he assigns her to help with Milton's research into walkers. Milton is observing a volunteer, Michael Coleman (Peter Kulas), who is slowly dying from cancer, to learn about how much memory retention walkers keep. Coleman finally dies and reanimates while secured to a bed. Milton believes that unsecuring Coleman would help Coleman provide better responses for his study, and proceeds to do so. Andrea quickly kills the reanimated Coleman before it can harm him. Milton realizes his theories are wrong, and Andrea escorts him from the room.

Rick, Daryl, Michonne, and Oscar drive about a mile from town, planning to go on foot the rest of the way. As they travel, they are caught in a pack of walkers, and forced to take shelter in a small cabin. The cabin is occupied by a hermit (Alex Van), who panics and tries to hold them at gunpoint while shouting at them, attracting the walkers. Michonne kills him, and they push his body out the front of the cabin to lure the walkers away while they escape out the back. With Woodbury in sight, the group takes cover near a freight train to assess the situation, while on the other side of Woodbury's walls, Andrea approaches the Governor, explaining how Milton's test went and the Governor holds her to explain everything will be all right.

== Reception ==
=== Critical response ===
Zack Handlen, writing for The A.V. Club, rated the episode an A− on an A to F scale; citing the copious amounts of happenings within the episode and declaring most of them exciting. Eric Goldman at IGN gave the episode an 8.9 out of 10, praising the director's lack of music for scenes depicting Michonne and Carl's character development.

=== Ratings ===
Upon its initial broadcast on November 25, 2012, "When the Dead Come Knocking" was watched by an estimated 10.42 million viewers, reflecting an increase in viewership from the previous episode which had 9.21 million viewers.
