= Walk with Me (The Walking Dead) =

- The Walking Dead episode
- Andrea and Michonne are allowed into Woodbury by The Governor.
- Episode no.: Season 3 Episode 3
- Directed by: Guy Ferland
- Written by: Evan Reilly
- Cinematography by: Rohn Schmidt
- Editing by: Robert Bramwell
- Original air date: October 28, 2012

Guest appearances
- Dallas Roberts as Milton Mamet; Jose Pablo Cantillo as Caesar Martinez; Julio Cesar Cedillo as Lieutenant Welles; Donzaleigh Abernathy as Dr. Stevens; Lindsay Abernathy as Rowan; Dwayne Boyd as National Guardsman; Arthur Bridgers as Crowley; Troy Faruk as Sean; Lawrence Kao as Tim; Mike Mayhall as Franklin; Gary Weeks as Brady

Episode chronology
← Previous "Sick"	Next → "Killer Within"
- The Walking Dead season 3

"Walk with Me" is the third episode of the third season of the post-apocalyptic horror television series The Walking Dead, which aired on AMC in the United States on October 28, 2012. The episode primarily focuses on Andrea (Laurie Holden); having been separated from the rest of the group at the end of the previous season, she and fellow katana-wielding survivor, Michonne (Danai Gurira) find themselves in the company of Merle Dixon (Michael Rooker) as they are captured and brought to The Governor (David Morrissey) in a small town called Woodbury. Merle Dixon (Michael Rooker), who was previously seen physically in season 1 and as a hallucination in season 2, returns in this episode as a series regular.

== Plot ==
Michonne and an ailing Andrea witness a military helicopter crash into a nearby forest. They find all but one of the crew dead, and the survivor, Welles, badly injured. On hearing the approach of vehicles, Michonne, her enslaved walkers, and Andrea hide nearby. They observe a group of men rescue Welles and execute the other crewmen as they reanimate. Michonne's walkers make noises that alert the men to their presence, and though Michonne decapitates the walkers to stop them, Michonne and Andrea are captured. Andrea is surprised one of the men is Merle, Daryl's brother who Rick's group had left handcuffed to piping atop an Atlanta skyscraper. Merle was able to escape by sawing off his own hand, which he has replaced with a makeshift bayonet prosthetic. Andrea faints from the shock.

They are taken to Woodbury, a well-supplied, fortified town and sanctuary for around seventy survivors. After securing away their weapons, Merle interrogates them, explaining how he found his way from Atlanta to Woodbury, and now has become the right-hand man to The Governor (David Morrissey), the man who runs Woodbury. Andrea recounts her own escape from the Greene farmstead and separation from Rick's group, for whom Merle still holds contempt. They later meet The Governor, who offers to let them stay. Michonne is uneasy and asks for her weapons back so they can leave, but Andrea wants to learn more about the town. Over breakfast, The Governor introduces them to Milton (Dallas Roberts), his chief adviser, and attempts to learn more about Rick's group from them using his charisma. Michonne remains aloof and warns Andrea of her distrust for The Governor, but Andrea thinks Woodbury is safe.

Meanwhile, The Governor has interrogated Welles, learning that he was from a National Guard refugee camp located a short distance away from Woodbury. The camp had recently been overrun and Welles and a few other National Guardsmen were the only survivors. The Governor promises Welles he will send men to locate any survivors. After the breakfast with Andrea and Michonne, The Governor joins his men as they locate the camp. They ambush and kill the survivors and steal all the useful supplies. On returning to Woodbury, The Governor tells the town that the camp had already fallen to walkers, and stresses the importance of a fortified camp like Woodbury. Later, The Governor is shown going into his private rooms and sitting in a chair, looking upon a number of tanks containing walker heads, including those of Michonne's enslaved walkers and of Welles.

== Production ==
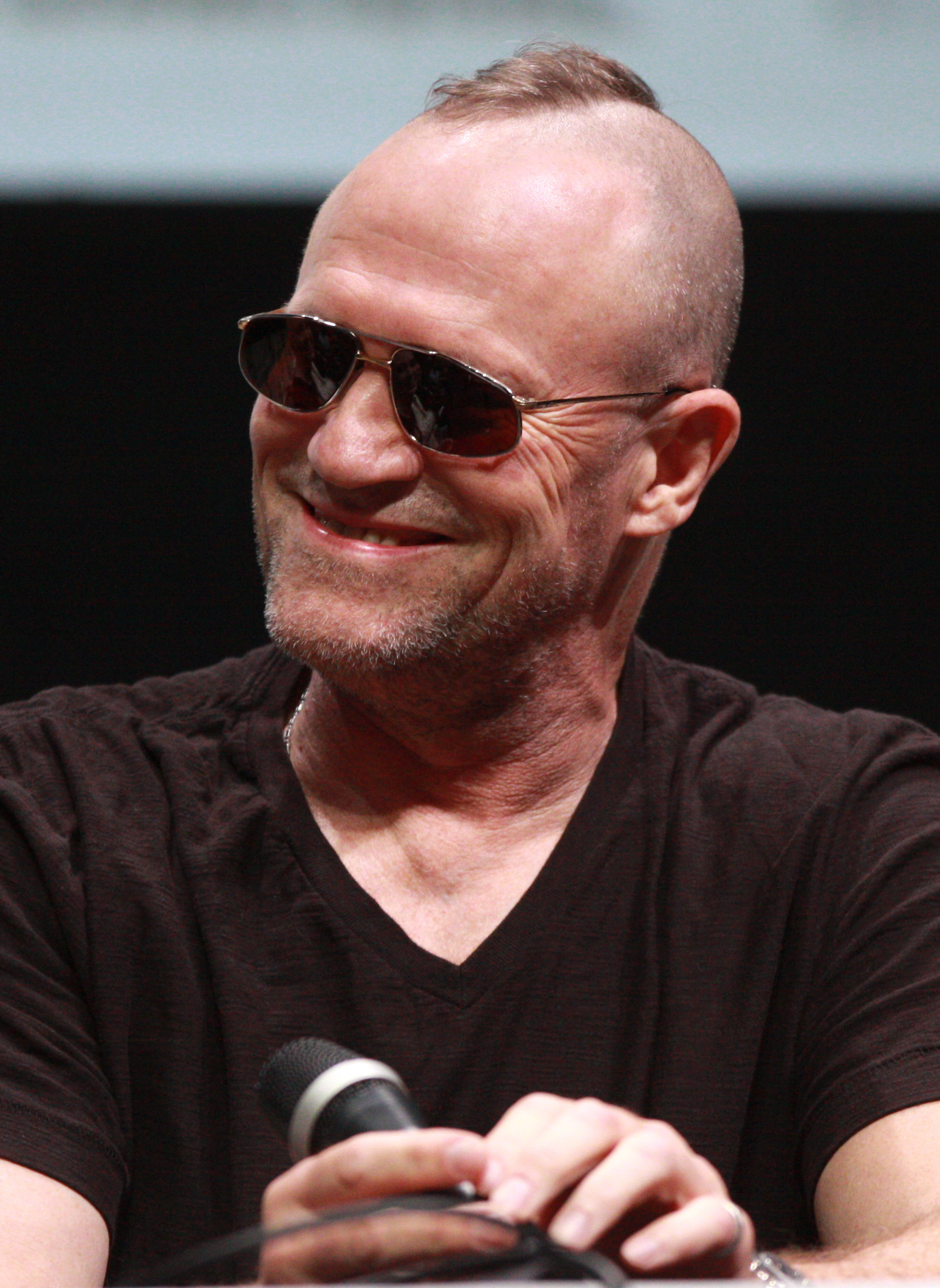
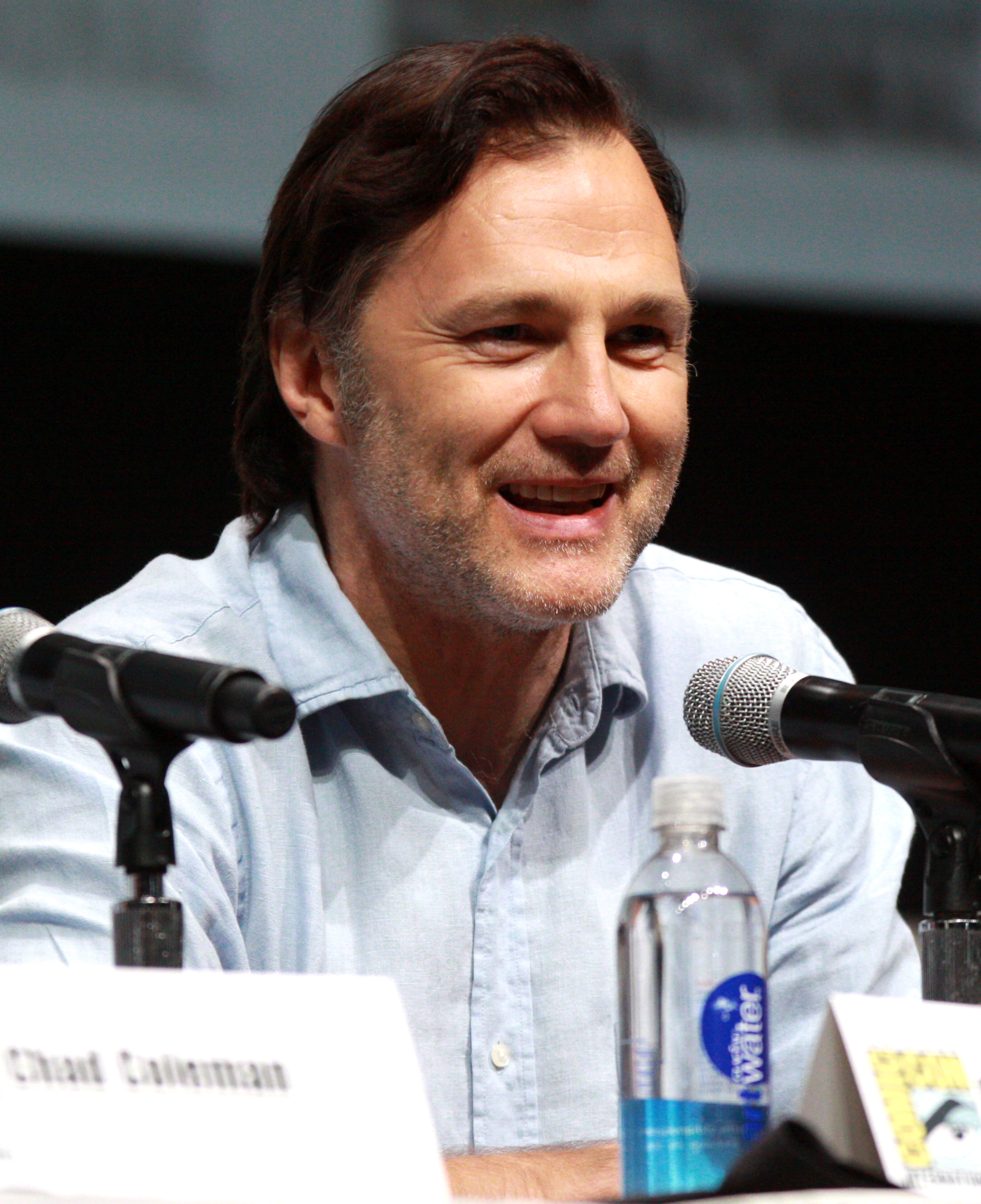
Michael Rooker (left) made his return to the series after his absence in previous seasons while David Morrissey (right) made his first appearance as The Governor.

David Morrissey (The Governor) makes his first appearance in the series and is added to the opening credits. Michael Rooker (Merle Dixon) is also added to the opening credits after having a recurring role in season one and guest starring in season two.

The episode focuses entirely on the new location of Woodbury, in contrast to the previous episode dedicated to the prison group.

This episode is also the first for Rick and Lori to be absent, and, as of this episode, no one has appeared in every episode.

== Reception ==
=== Critical response ===
The episode was generally well received. Zack Handlen, writing for The A.V. Club, gave the episode an A− on a scale from A to F. Eric Goldman at IGN gave the episode an 8.6 out of 10.

=== Ratings ===
Upon its initial broadcast on October 28, 2012, "Walk with Me" was watched by an estimated 10.51 million viewers, an increase of a million viewers from the previous episode.
