= Caesar Martinez =

Caesar Martínez
- The Walking Dead character
- Martínez, as portrayed by Jose Pablo Cantillo in the television series
- First appearance: Comic: "Issue #27" (2006); Television: "Walk with Me" (2012)
- Last appearance: Comic: "Issue #43" (2007); Television: "Dead Weight" (2013)
- Adapted by: Glen Mazzara (The Walking Dead)
- Portrayed by: Jose Pablo Cantillo

In-universe information
- Occupation: Gym Teacher; Guard for Woodbury; Television: Second-in-Command of the Woodbury army Supply Runner and Leader of the River Camp

Martinez (full name in the comic book series: Caesar Ramón Martínez) is a recurring fictional character from the comic book series The Walking Dead and was portrayed by Jose Pablo Cantillo in the third and fourth seasons of the television show of the same name. Martínez is introduced in the 27th issue of the comic book series in April 2006 as the loyal second-in-command to The Governor. He is responsible for bringing Rick Grimes and two of his fellow survivors, Michonne and Glenn into Woodbury to be questioned and later tortured. In the television series, he is introduced in the third season's third episode to Andrea and Michonne as one of The Governor's soldiers.

In the television series, Martínez is not as subservient to The Governor, being distraught and shocked over some of his actions and even sees the conflict between Woodbury and the prison as pointless, ultimately defecting from The Governor after he murders his entire army. He becomes the leader of his own camp of survivors after Woodbury is abandoned, which includes Tara and Lilly Chambler. Though he does have an ego and a survivalist mindset, Martínez is reasonable enough to let new members into his group so long as they contribute.

== Appearances ==
=== Comic book series ===
Caesar Martinez is a former gym teacher from Augusta, Georgia. Martinez's backstory is told in The Walking Dead novels, The Rise of the Governor, and The Road to Woodbury.

In the comics, it was Martinez who conducted Rick, Glenn, and Michonne's entry to Woodbury. He later helped Rick's party escape and fight their way back to the prison. After assisting Rick's party in escaping, Martinez betrays them by sneaking out of the prison to go tell The Governor its location so that he may capture and kill everyone inside. During his run back to Woodbury, Rick runs him down in the RV. However, Martinez claims that he was going to bring the good people in Woodbury back, which does not include The Governor, aware of the monster he is. Rick doesn't believe him, and he strangles him to death and leaves him to reanimate. Caesar's reanimated body is discovered by a Woodbury scouting party, and his head is brought back to Woodbury, to manipulate people to turn them against the people of the prison.

In The Fall of the Governor, his zombified head is put down by Lilly Caul following the failed prison assault.

=== Television series ===
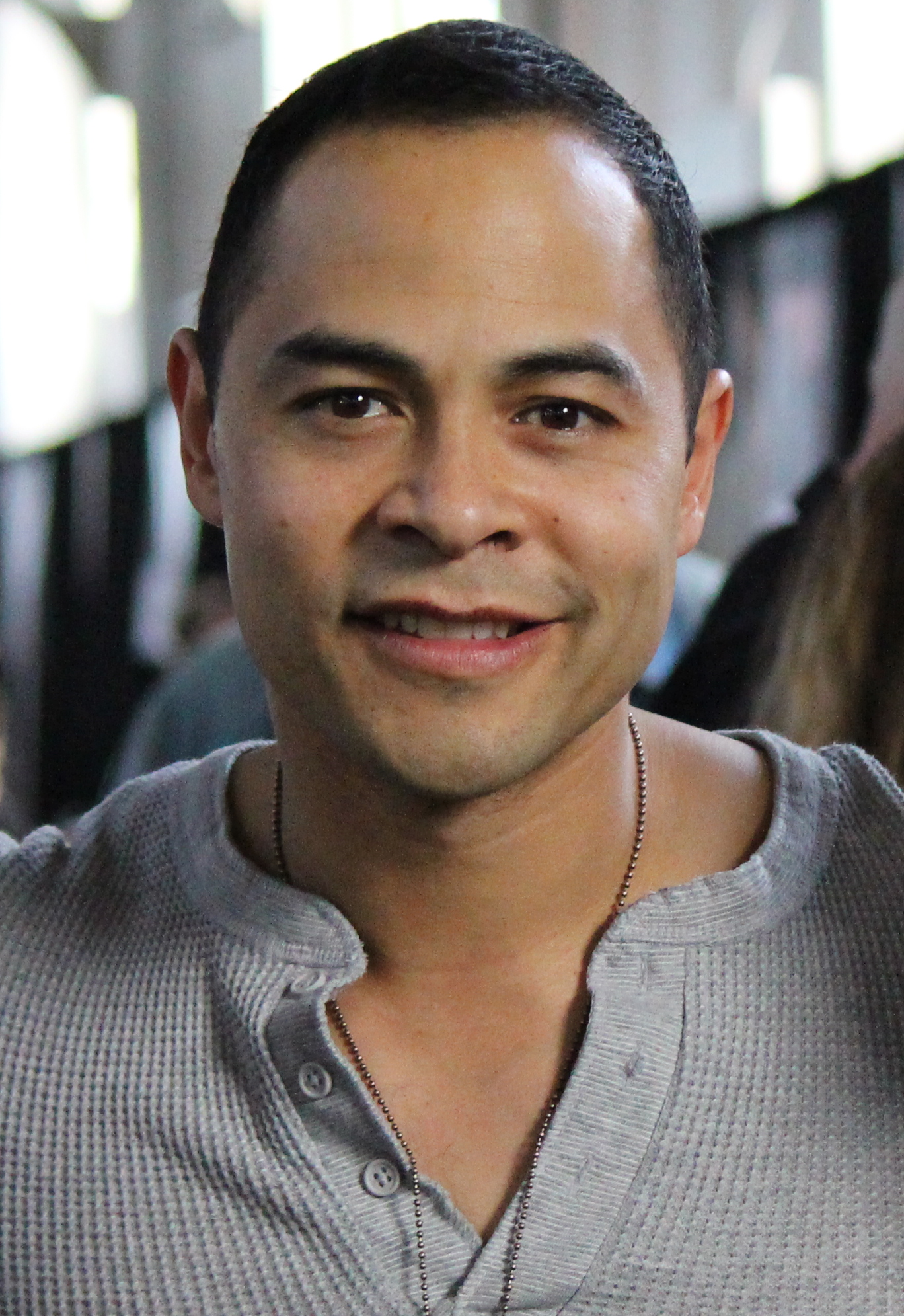
Jose Pablo Cantillo (pictured in 2015) portrays Martinez in the TV series.

==== Season 3 ====
Martinez is a sharpshooter, and one of The Governor's enforcers in Woodbury. In the episode "Walk with Me", he is at the scene of the helicopter crash, wielding a baseball bat. He is later one of the Governor's men who ambushes and kills a military detachment for their supplies. In the episode "Say the Word", he is seen wearing a baseball jersey bearing the number 23. Merle referred to him both as "Brownie" (which is derogatory) and as "Bro" in the same conversation. Martinez and Merle act as sparring partners in Woodbury's gladiator-style tournaments. In the episode "When the Dead Come Knocking", he helps the Governor interrogate Glenn and Maggie. In the episode "Made to Suffer", Rick and his group come to Woodbury to rescue Glenn and Maggie, and Martinez helps fight them. When the Governor brands Merle a traitor, Martinez puts a gun to Merle's back. In the episode "The Suicide King", Rick's group helps Merle and Daryl escape, and Martinez helps to keep the people in line after the attack. In the episode "Home", Martinez assists The Governor in his attack against the prison, firing at Rick to keep him pinned down. In the episode "I Ain't a Judas", Martinez becomes The Governor's most trusted enforcer and the Governor puts him in charge of recruiting the townspeople to form an army.

In the episode "Arrow on the Doorpost", Martinez accompanies the Governor to a meeting spot to speak with Rick. Martinez waits outside and meets with Daryl and Hershel. As the two of them kill a small group of walkers, he reveals to Daryl that his wife and children were killed by walkers when the apocalypse began. When the Governor and his people return to Woodbury, he tells Martinez to set an ambush so they can bring Michonne back alive and kill the rest of Rick's people when they show up to the next meeting. In the episode "Prey", Martinez confiscates Andrea's gun, because the Governor wants to keep her separate from Martinez's operations. Allen and Tyreese later accompany Martinez to the Biter Pits. In the episode "This Sorrowful Life", Merle makes a surprise attack on the Woodbury army, but Martinez and the Governor attack him when he is distracted, beating Merle so that the Governor can kill him. In the third-season finale, "Welcome to the Tombs", Martinez accompanies the Governor when he leads his army against the prison. After the assault fails, Martinez is shocked when The Governor massacres his army for refusing to resume the attack. Because Martinez and Shumpert allied themselves with him, The Governor spares them, and together, the three depart.

==== Season 4 ====
In the episode "Live Bait", in a flashback set hours after the prison attack, a depressed Governor does not try to stop a walker from killing him, forcing Martinez to shoot it. Seeing the Governor broken, Martinez and Shumpert abandon him. Months later, Martinez finds The Governor trapped in a ditch with a child. In the next episode "Dead Weight", Martinez, accompanied by Alisha and the brothers Pete and Mitch Dolgen, rescues the Governor from the pit and learn he has adopted the Chambler family, Lilly, Tara and Meghan but they identity him as "Brian" much to Martinez's confusion. Martinez is revealed to be the leader of a small community, which considers him their "mayor". Mitch initially tells Martinez to abandon The Governor and the Chamblers but Martinez allows him to stay for his new family's sake but makes it clear that Martinez is in charge. Martinez then takes the Governor on a supply run with Mitch and Pete, and they find a decapitated corpse that leads them to a cabin deep within the woods, where they find another headless corpse and at the front door of the cabin they find another corpse, this one dead from a self-inflicted gunshot wound. They explore inside and are attacked by walkers - including two that are just severed heads - and the Governor saves Martinez and Pete. Afterwards, the four find supplies as well as some beer, and relax and talk. Martinez later reveals to the Governor that he would have left the Governor in the ditch if he didn't have the child with him. The Governor remarks that he knew that Shumpert did not survive and Martinez reveals that after they left, Shumpert got reckless and was bitten near one of the walker pits, and Martinez shot him out of mercy. While Martinez and the Governor are on top of an RV as the former hits golf balls into the nearby pit full of walkers, Martinez briefly mentions the possibility of him and the Governor sharing leadership of the camp. At this suggestion, the Governor hits Martinez in the back of the head with a golf club and kicks him off the RV. He then drags Martinez over to the pit and slowly lowers him in head-first, repeating the phrase "I don't want it!" before finally letting the walkers pull Martinez in. The next morning, brothers Pete and Mitch, who served as Martinez's top men, reveal that they found his remains in the pit, and assume that he fell in due to being drunk.

== Development and reception ==
Zack Handlen, writing for The A.V. Club in his review of "Say the Word", describes the fight match between Merle and Martinez as a way to "blow off steam", commenting: "The night-fights are stupid and silly, but they at least offer some sense of victory over the dead, some way to normalize all that's happened." TV critic Keven Skinner, in his review of "Arrow on the Doorpost", enjoyed the scene between Daryl and Martinez, which he called playing a game of "whose d*** is bigger", by one-upping each other via brutal zombie kills. Skinner called Martinez's baseball bat kills "some of the most brutal this season" and the accompanying special effects "fantastic". Skinner also found it funny that during the filming of the scene, actor Norman Reedus missed his zombie target and wound hitting the back of Cantillo's head twice with a rubber knife. Zack Handlen called this scene one of the "small, effective scenes that help to remind us just how unreal all of this is, and how pointless any battle between Woodbury and the prison will be". Asked about how he can relate to the competitiveness shown in this scene, Cantillo gave some insight into his childhood: "I have two older brothers, and you're just as competitive playing football as you are eating pickled eggs, or trying to kill zombies. As long as you don't take it too far, I think it's a good way for people to relate."

The episode "Dead Weight" marks the last appearance of Martinez, who was killed by The Governor (David Morrissey) in the episode. On The Governor's reasoning for killing Martinez, Morrissey explained:

I think Martinez makes the mistake of admitting weakness. He says to the Governor, "I'm not sure I can keep this place safe." Had he turned around to the Governor on that day where he was playing golf and said, "There is no way this camp is not going to be safe. I'm going to make it safe. I'm going to do everything I can to make it safe," then the Governor is going to say, "Great, I'll follow you." But as soon as the man admits weakness, then the Governor is going to take control. And the Governor is killing him and screaming, "I don't want it!" What he doesn't want is the responsibility. He doesn't want the responsibility he is forced to take because of this man's weakness. That's very important. He's putting a crown on his head that he doesn't want. But nobody else but him is worthy of wearing it."
