= Tyreese =

Character from The Walking Dead

- The Walking Dead character
- Tyreese, as portrayed by Chad L. Coleman in the television series (left) and in the comic book series (right).
- First appearance: Comic: "Issue #7" (2004); Television: "Made to Suffer" (2012)
- Last appearance: Comic: "Issue #72" (2010); Television: "Forget" (2015)
- Created by: Robert Kirkman; Charlie Adlard
- Adapted by: Glen Mazzara; Robert Kirkman
- Portrayed by: Chad L. Coleman

In-universe information
- Occupation: NFL linebacker Comic: Car salesman Bouncer; Television: Supply Runner for the prison Guard for Woodbury
- Weapon: Hammer
- Family: Television: Sasha Williams (sister)
- Significant others: Comic: Carol; Michonne; Television: Karen
- Children: Comic: Julie (daughter)

Tyreese (full name in the television series: Tyreese Williams) is a fictional character from the comic book series The Walking Dead and was portrayed by Chad L. Coleman in the American television series of the same name. He is a prominent character in both mediums, acting as group leader Rick Grimes' right hand man in the comic book series, up until the end of "Made to Suffer".

Introduced in The Walking Dead #7 (April 2004), Tyreese is a strong-willed and devoted father and protective leader of his fellow survivors. He is often conflicted with Rick in his leadership and stability, but nevertheless remains loyal to him. A role model to his fellow survivors, particularly Rick's son, Carl, Tyreese is a strong and able-bodied fighter who favors a hammer to firearms in both mediums. Despite this, Tyreese is shown to suffer from emotional fragility, especially after the death of his daughter. He strongly rejects the nature of suicide, and remains unsympathetic to those who commit it. His death leaves a significant mark on the survivors, particularly his girlfriend, Michonne.

In the television series, Tyreese is the leader of a group which was once composed of 25 survivors. He travels from Jacksonville, Florida to Georgia in search of a safe haven after losing many of his group members. Unlike his comic series counterpart, Tyreese is not a father, but acts as the primary caretaker of Rick and Lori Grimes's daughter, Judith, in Rick's absence. He shares a close sibling bond with his younger sister, Sasha. In the fourth season, Tyreese faces many difficult decisions and obstacles, such as the mysterious murder of his sick girlfriend Karen and the deaths of Lizzie and Mika Samuels, whom he had protected. Tyreese cannot bring himself to kill another human being, even an undead one. A featurette for the fifth season Blu-ray and DVD, as well as the action figure releases of the character, reveal his full name to be "Tyreese Williams." He was initially a recurring character in the third season until he was promoted to series regular for the fourth and fifth seasons. Coleman's performance has been praised by critics.

== Appearances ==
=== Character biography ===
In the comics, Tyreese is described as having failed his brief stint in the NFL as a linebacker for the Atlanta Falcons. Throughout the following years he went through a variety of unsatisfying jobs, such as a bouncer and, up until the outbreak, a car salesman. He was a divorcé with a teenage daughter named Julie, over whom he had always remained fiercely protective. His relationship with Julie, however, was often strained because of the tension between him and Julie's boyfriend Chris.

In the television series, Tyreese is introduced as being from Jacksonville, Florida, along with his sister, Sasha. He and Sasha hid in a neighbor's underground bunker as the outbreak occurred for seven months. Upon leaving the bunker and heading out on their own, they came across another group of survivors. Their camp was eventually overrun and the group gradually became smaller until it narrowed down to him, Sasha, and a family of three (Allen, Donna, and their teenage son, Ben) surviving out in the woods.

=== Comic book series ===
Tyreese, as depicted in the comic book series.

Tyreese, Julie, and Chris meet up with Rick's group on the highway as winter begins to approach. He quickly becomes an essential asset to the group, providing them with muscle, as well as leadership qualities, which earned Rick's trust in him. Within a matter of days, he and Carol engaged in a subtle romantic relationship, with him often acting as her emotional and physical protector. He continually struggled putting up with Julie and Chris's sexual antics, and failed with his attempt to establish ground rules for the two of them. Shortly following their arrival at Wiltshire Estates, his relationship with Carol escalated and resulted in the two of them having sex.

After fleeing Wiltshire and settling into an abandoned prison, Tyreese had the misfortune of discovering the outcome of a suicide pact between Chris and Julie, that resulted in Julie being shot dead and Chris remaining alive. In a fit of hysterics, Tyreese strangled the boy to death and mutilated his corpse. Surprisingly, he got over what had transpired rather quickly, much to Rick's confusion and concern. The two continued to have a strong relationship, with Tyreese often giving Rick guidance and assisting him with various physical things. Upon the arrival of Michonne, Tyreese found himself seduced by her in the gym, and initially attempted to keep it hidden from Carol, unbeknownst to the fact that Carol had witnessed the event happen first-hand. After a few woeful attempts to compete with Michonne, Carol ended their relationship and forced him to move to another cell block, where he continued to see Michonne, albeit in vain because of his regret over losing Carol. Carol ultimately attempted to commit suicide by slashing her wrists which, soon after, led to a violent altercation between him and Rick. This event marked the point where their close friendship was severed.

When the rest of the group decided Rick was unfit to lead following the fight, Tyreese was later made part of the decision committee, along with Hershel and Dale. His relationship with Rick continued to be strained; however, the two still managed to cooperate and work with each other at various times.

As the group prepared for war against Woodbury, Tyreese led a handful of people to a nearby National Guard station where Woodbury retrieved many of its supplies. They were nearly ambushed by The Governor's men. Tyreese was devastated upon witnessing Carol kill herself in front of the group; however, his grief quickly turned to anger because of how he saw suicide as a pathetic act. Nevertheless, her death drove him deeper into the arms of Michonne. During the attack on the prison, he and Michonne attempted guerilla warfare, only to be ambushed in their attempt and Tyreese captured and taken as a hostage. The Governor planned to use him as leverage so as to gain access into the prison; however, when this fails, as Tyreese begs the group not to listen to the Governor's demands, Tyreese is slowly and brutally decapitated in front of the group. In the aftermath of the assault, Michonne kills his re-animated head.

His role as a strong defender of the group and generally righteous man had a lasting impression on the survivors of the assault. Michonne sadly refers back to Tyreese when confiding in Rick about her loneliness, signifying he had more a lasting emotional impact upon the detached Michonne than she had previously led her fellow survivors to believe. She briefly tried to have a one night stand with Heath to move on from this but he turned her down, having been told about Tyreese from Glenn earlier and tries to encourage her to face her demons rather than ignore them. Glenn recalled the story of his miraculous survival in the prison gym to several Alexandria citizens at the group's welcome party, all of whom were stunned and in awe upon hearing this.

=== Television series ===
==== Season 3 ====
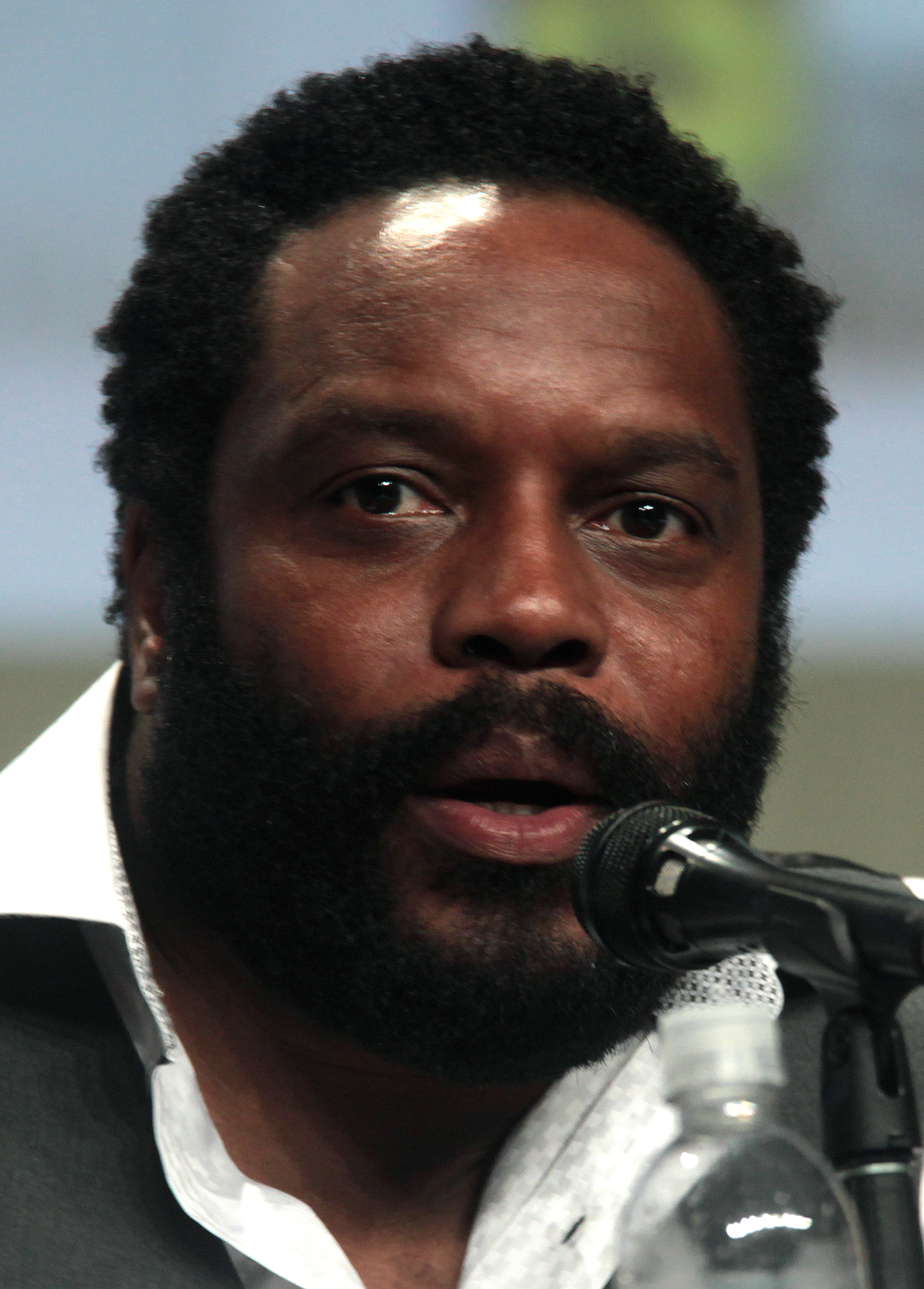
Chad L. Coleman (pictured in 2014) portrayed Tyreese in the TV series

In the episode "Made to Suffer", Tyreese and his group discover the prison and proceed to sneak in, through the exposed back side of one of the buildings. They are no sooner locked in a cell block by Carl, while Rick and others are away at Woodbury. Donna, having been bit in the woods, succumbs to her infection and dies, and Tyreese takes it upon himself to prevent reanimation by destroying her skull with his hammer. In the episode "The Suicide King", while in the process of burying Donna outside, Allen proposes ambushing the group and taking over, however Tyreese refutes the idea, acknowledging that despite the circumstances, they're 'good' people. Once Rick arrives back, his mental instability forces Tyreese and his group to clear out.

They stay nearby the prison in the woods and are eventually discovered in the episode "I Ain't a Judas", by Andrea and Milton, the latter of whom takes them to Woodbury. The Governor welcomes them with open arms, once they agree to provide a layout of the prison. In the episode "Prey", they are shown to have settled into the town, all four of them taking on active roles within the community. Tyreese and Sasha serve as the community's primary wall-guards. While they are on watch, Andrea reveals to them that the Governor has done terrible things and is planning worse, before she escapes over the wall. Tyreese is later taken to the Biter Pits to help collect captive walkers, and gets into a fight with Allen. He later asks the Governor why he keeps the walkers, but the Governor assures him that they are used only as a scare tactic.

In the episode "Welcome to the Tombs", Allen is recruited as part of The Governor's army for the war against Rick's group. The Governor attempts to recruit Tyreese and Sasha as well, however they want no involvement in the bloodshed and opt to stay behind with the children while the rest of the able-bodied go off to fight. Allen, as well as most other Woodbury citizens who went off to fight, are gunned down by The Governor after their raid fails. The lone survivor of the massacre, Karen, guides Rick's group to Woodbury, where Tyreese is keeping watch. He lets them all in, guides them to a room where they find Andrea bitten, and stands vigil outside the door while Andrea shoots herself. Awakened to The Governor's maliciousness and concerned for everyone's well-being, he and Rick agree on moving everyone to the prison.

==== Season 4 ====
In the season premiere "30 Days Without an Accident", Tyreese is shown to have adapted to life in the prison and begins a romantic relationship with Karen. He goes with others on a supply run that turns deadly for a young man named Zach; upon returning to the prison he spends the night with Karen. In the episode "Infected", a mysterious, deadly illness spreads through the prison. After he learns that Karen and David—another survivor—are sick, they are both quarantined by the prison's council. Sometime soon afterward, while attempting to visit her, Tyreese finds that both she and David have been dragged outside, murdered and set afire as a means of disposal. In the episode "Isolation", when Rick and Daryl attempt to calm him, he turns violent and begins to attack them. During this, Rick flies into a rage and badly beats Tyreese before Daryl pulls him off. After recovering, Tyreese finds out his sister Sasha is also sick and goes with Daryl, Michonne and Bob to find medicine. In the episode "Indifference", they get the supplies and return to the prison to treat the surviving patients. In the mid-season finale "Too Far Gone", Tyrese discovers a dissected rabbit in the tombs and tells Rick and Daryl he thinks it was the same person who killed Karen, but when they try to tell Tyreese who really killed Karen, they are interrupted as The Governor attacks the prison. Tyreese takes part in the fight with The Governor's group and he is cornered by two of the Governor's soldiers, but both are killed by Lizzie and Mika Samuels. The children then run towards the prison, with Tyreese following them, telling them to go the other way.

In the episode "Inmates", following the attack on the prison, Tyreese is split into a group with Lizzie, Mika and Judith where they are soon joined by Carol, who doesn't mention anything about her exile from the group by Rick. They follow a set of train tracks where they discover a sign indicating that a place called Terminus promises sanctuary and community. In the episode "The Grove", the group takes a break from following the train tracks to Terminus, and find a house in the middle of a pecan grove. Carol and Tyreese later return from a hunting trip to find that Lizzie had killed Mika and was about to kill Judith, thinking that everyone would understand that Mika was just a changed person after reanimating as a walker. Viewing Lizzie as too dangerous to be around other people, Carol and Tyreese discuss Lizzie's fate, and Carol is forced to shoot Lizzie in the head. Afterward, Tyreese learns that Carol was responsible for killing both Karen and David. She slides a .38 Colt Detective Special revolver across the table, telling Tyreese to do what he has to do. Tyreese refuses to kill her, saying that he forgives her, but he can't forget what she's done because it has now become a part of who she is. Tyreese, Judith and Carol leave the pecan grove and resume following the train tracks.

==== Season 5 ====
In the season premiere "No Sanctuary", Tyreese and Carol continue along the tracks to Terminus with Judith though Tyreese is still in shock because of Lizzie's actions. They are forced to avoid an entire herd headed for Terminus, and after avoiding it they overhear Martin, a Terminus resident, talking on a radio about "bleeding out" Carl and Michonne. Tyreese holds Martin hostage while Carol heads to Terminus to rescue their friends, destroying Terminus in the process. In a moment's distraction Martin grabbed Judith trying to escape and Tyreese severely beat him. Tyreese is later reunited with Sasha and the others as they made their way away from Terminus and finally reunites Judith with Rick. He also tells Carol that he killed Martin. In the episode "Strangers", the group continues to travel away from Terminus and Tyreese tells Carol he doesn't want the others to find out about Lizzie and Mika, wanting to forget it, as the group later takes shelter in Father Gabriel's church. In the episode "Four Walls and a Roof", as the group looks for the vanished Daryl and Carol, Bob reappears in front of the church with his leg cut off and eaten by Gareth and the other survivors from Terminus. Bob was also bitten by a walker, so Tyreese tries to encourage Sasha to stay with him until the end. She instead joins Rick in chasing after Gareth and Tyreese stays behind with Bob, Carl, Rosita, Eugene, Gabriel and Judith. However Gareth, with a still-alive Martin and the rest of his group, instead storm the church itself but Rick's group reappears and Tyreese watches, disturbed, as Rick, Sasha, Michonne and Abraham massacre Gareth, Martin and the rest of their group. After Bob dies Tyreese stabs his head to prevent reanimation and buries Gareth, Martin and the rest.

In the episode "Crossed", the group learns from Daryl and Noah that Beth is alive and forcibly held in a hospital, led by Officer Dawn Lerner, in Atlanta as is Carol now. Tyreese goes with Rick, Daryl, Sasha and Noah to retrieve Beth and Carol. When Rick makes a plan to kill most of the police, Tyreese instead suggests capturing two of Dawn's subordinates and trading them for Beth and Carl. They capture Officers Lamson, Licari and Shepherd, while Tyreese also tries to help Sasha who is still distraught over Bob's death. In the mid-season finale "Coda", Tyreese speaks to Sasha about being double-crossed with Officer Lamson. He reveals to her that he did not kill Martin, and believes that their good-hearted nature is the reason for both of their mistakes, saying that they are still the same. Sasha rejects this, saying that he is the same but she cannot be the same after Bob's death. He is later present at the exchange when Rick trades Shepherd and Licari for Beth and Carol. Dawn demands Noah which results in Beth accidentally being killed by Dawn, which in turn provokes Daryl to shoot Dawn. The church group then steps outside with Beth's lifeless body as Abraham's group arrives in time to see the horror also.

In the mid-season premiere "What Happened and What's Going On," Tyreese goes with the remaining survivors to Noah's home but discover his gated community to have been destroyed and overrun with walkers. Tyreese talks to a grieving Noah who tells him about Karen and how he almost killed himself by throwing himself at the walkers at the prison, but regained his will to live and saved Judith, telling Noah that he needs to be able to recover without letting the grief go to his head. Tyreese helps clear Noah's house so he can see his family's bodies but while Tyreese is looking at photos of Noah's brothers he is bitten by Noah's younger brother who had become a walker. Tyreese begins to bleed out from the infection but is taunted by hallucinations of Martin and the Governor criticizing him for his inability to act in the face of danger, and make him believe that his lack of trying may have led to other group members being killed. However Tyreese is comforted by hallucinations of Bob, Beth, Lizzie and Mika who assure him that his actions were the right ones and it's not his fault what happened to them, and assure him that it's ok for him to let go. When the Governor especially criticizes him for his inability to kill Carol despite killing Karen, Tyreese confronts him criticizing him for all the actions he committed and all the people that died because of them. After scolding him Tyreese proudly defends his actions and knows that he made the right calls and that people like him, they do get to live. Tyreese hallucinates Lizzie and Mika holding his hand, which in reality it is Rick and Michonne attempting to save him by chopping off his infected arm and carry him to the car to get back to the others to save him. On the way however Tyreese blood loss becomes severe and he decides to let go as he sees Bob, Beth, Lizzie and Mika in the car one last time assuring him it's ok now and looks around to see their faces, now no longer with their wounds, smiling at them and passes away peacefully. After dying Michonne puts him down to prevent reanimation and he is buried by Rick, with his cap left on his cross while his funeral is presided over by Gabriel during which a grief-ridden Sasha is barely able to stand.

In the episode "Forget", struggling to adjust to the relative normality of life in Alexandria, Sasha experiences flashbacks of Bob, Beth, and Tyreese, which causes her to snap at the others and storm off after hearing them complain about "simple" matters.

==== Season 7 ====
In The Day Will Come When You Won't Be, after watching Negan brutally murder Abraham and Glenn, a traumatized Rick experiences memory flashes of various people he's known and lost since the outbreak occurred, including Tyreese.

==== Season 9 ====
In the episode What Comes After, Tyreese is among the field of corpse Rick sees in his vision shortly before seeing Sasha Williams.

== Casting and reception ==
Chad L. Coleman was cast as Tyreese in mid 2012. On the auditioning process, Coleman said: "I knew I was auditioning for Tyreese. I got a call that Robert Kirkman had his eye on me since seeing me as Cuddy [sic] from The Wire. He'd been looking at me for a while and I didn't know about it. There was a lot of buzz online about people wanting this character to appear and who should play him — and I was on a lot of those lists. That echoed Kirkman's sentiments and he went to AMC and said, "Chad is Tyreese." They said fine but we have to see other people and Kirkman said, "But it's Chad." He went to bat for me and I was grateful that it all worked out. I eventually auditioned for it with dummy sides. I went in and then had to come back one more time and then that was it. What I remember most about my audition was not having a car and having to take the bus to Raleigh Studios in [Hollywood]. I appreciate Robert for his sticktuitedness and AMC for seeing what he saw — eventually."

Tyreese, a fan favorite character in the comics, was adapted to appear in the third season of the TV series when it came back after its midseason break. Chad Coleman was seen in Senoia on set by fans and supposedly autographed photos with his character's name. On November 20, 2012, his role as Tyreese was officially confirmed. Coleman described the character - "With Tyreese, I really feel the sky's the limit", and that he is "a bona fide leader that can probably find his footing in any situation". Zack Handlen, writing for The A.V. Club, noted that his introduction in the episode "Made to Suffer" happened to occur in the same episode that Oscar - another African-American character - was fatally shot; Forbes magazine's Erik Kain also noted that he was worried for Tyreese because it seemed to him like "black guys in The Walking Dead do not have an easy time staying alive".

Eric Goldman at IGN enjoyed the return of Tyreese in the episode "I Ain't a Judas". Zack Handlen felt that it was hard to blame Tyreese and his group for siding with the Governor rather than Rick, who seemed insane.

Eric Goldman enjoyed the fact that Tyreese was fleshed out more in the episode "Prey". Zack Handlen felt that most of the storyline for Tyreese in this episode was "on the clunky side, forcing conflicts that will most likely pay off down the line with rough, ugly timing". He felt that it made sense for Tyreese and Sasha to start questioning the Governor's motivations because "they're still good people at heart, far more in tune with what Rick and his group are aiming for than the Governor's burgeoning fascism", but felt that the conflict between Tyreese and Allen made less sense because Allen was mostly unfamiliar as yet.

An interview with Dallas Roberts (Milton) revealed that in the original, unaired ending of the third season finale, "Welcome to the Tombs", only Tyreese and one other character were to have found Andrea.

Noel Murray of Rolling Stone ranked Tyreese Williams 21st in a list of 30 best Walking Dead characters, saying, "This fan-favorite from the comics took longer than expected to arrive on TV, but once he showed up, Tyreese (played by The Wire's Chad L. Coleman) served the show well during his three seasons. His story arc saw him go from being a strong, silent sidekick to experiencing his own personal tragedy – and then finding himself on the road with Carol, the woman partly responsible for the death of his lover."
