= The Governor (The Walking Dead) =

Character from The Walking Dead

- The Walking Dead character
- The Governor, as portrayed by David Morrissey in the television series (left) and in the comic book series (right)
- First appearance: Comic: "Issue #27" (2006); Literature: Rise of the Governor (2011); Television: "Walk with Me" (2012)
- Last appearance: Comic: "Issue #72" (2010); Literature: The Fall of the Governor (2014); Television: "A New Deal" (2022)
- Created by: Robert Kirkman; Charlie Adlard; Cliff Rathburn
- Adapted by: Glen Mazzara; Evan Reilly (The Walking Dead)
- Portrayed by: David Morrissey

In-universe information
- Occupation: Leader of Woodbury, Georgia; Comic and Novels: Failed Music Store Entrepreneur; Television: Middle-Management Employee; Leader and Supply Runner for the River Camp
- Family: Penny Blake (niece in novels, daughter in TV series); Comic and Novels: Ed Blake (father); Rose Blake (mother); Bud Blake (uncle); Nina Blake (sister-in-law); Philip Blake (brother)
- Spouses: Comic and Novels: Jocelyn Blake; Television: Mrs. Blake
- Significant others: Television: Rowan; Andrea Harrison; Lilly Chambler

The Governor (real name in the novel and comic book: Brian Blake, alias Philip Blake; in the TV series: Philip Blake, alias Brian Heriot) is a fictional character and one of the main antagonists from The Walking Dead comic book and television series. On television, he was portrayed by David Morrissey. Created by Robert Kirkman and artists Charlie Adlard and Cliff Rathburn, the character made his comics debut in The Walking Dead #27 in April 2006 and his television debut in season 3. In both series, the Governor is the ruthless, charismatic leader of the town of Woodbury, Georgia, who comes into conflict with protagonist Rick Grimes and is responsible for the deaths of several primary characters. The Governor's origins are explored in the novel The Walking Dead: Rise of the Governor, written by Kirkman and Jay Bonansinga.

In the television series, the Governor's disturbing motives are reflected in his authoritarian ways in dealing with threats to his community, primarily by executing most large groups and only accepting lone survivors into his community. His dark nature escalates when he comes into conflict with Rick Grimes' group, who are occupying the nearby prison. The Governor vows to eliminate the prison group after Michonne gouges his eye out and "kills" his zombified daughter, and in that pursuit, he leaves several key characters dead both in Rick's group and his own. The Governor has a romantic relationship with Andrea, who unsuccessfully seeks to broker a truce between the two groups, eventually leading to the Governor killing Andrea by having her be bitten by a Walker. In season 4, the Governor attempts to redeem himself upon meeting a new family, to whom he introduces himself as Brian Heriot. However, he commits several brutal acts to ensure the family's survival, and eventually leads a new group to attack the prison, leading to its destruction and the Governor's death.

In 2009, the Governor was ranked as IGN's 86th-greatest comic book villain of all time, whilst the TV show version of the character was ranked #28 on TV Guide's list of 'The 60 Nastiest Villains of All Time', and was ranked #19 on Rolling Stone's list of greatest TV villains of all time. For his performance as the Governor, Morrissey was nominated for Best Supporting Actor at the 39th Saturn Awards.

== Appearances ==
=== Comic book series ===
Aside from simply "the Governor," the character's name appeared to be Philip Blake; however, with the release of the novel The Walking Dead: Rise of the Governor, it was revealed that his actual name was Brian Blake, and Philip was revealed to be his deceased brother.

When the dead began to rise, Brian and Phil (Philip) gathered a small group, which included Brian's niece Penny, and the group were constantly on the run when unsecured locations were breached; the planned community called the Wiltshire Estates, where Rick's group coincidentally stayed, was one of these. Eventually, Brian's group came upon Woodbury, Georgia, a ravaged town being led by a group of National Guardsmen under Major Gene Gavin, who used fear to assert his authority. After becoming the last of his group, Brian rallied the townspeople against Gavin and the Guardsmen and afterward declared himself "Governor" of the four blocks making up the settlement. Initially appearing to be a fair and strong leader, he became increasingly more ruthless and power-hungry. He kept the zombified Penny tied up in his apartment, feeding her severed body parts of those who displeased him.

Following Woodbury's capture and the murder of stranded refugees from Atlanta, the Governor is met by Rick Grimes, when Grimes' band of survivors explores the town. After initially acting hospitable, the Governor turns on the group. Attempting to find the location of Rick's prison refuge in order to collect supplies for Woodbury, the Governor proceeds to cut off Rick's hand, torture Glenn, and rape and torture Michonne. To learn the location of the prison, the Governor allows the survivors to escape the premises with the help of one of his guards, Caesar Martinez. However, Michonne stays behind and finds her way to the Governor's apartment, where she brutally tortures him, severing his right arm, fingernails, penis, and left eye. When Michonne rejoins the group and they ask her if the Governor is still alive, Michonne is uncertain. The Governor survives with the help of Bob Stookey, a citizen who had medical experience, and is eventually able to find the prison. The Governor uses Rick's murder of Martinez to rally Woodbury's townspeople against the prison's inhabitants. Things do not go according to plan, however, as Rick's group puts up a tenacious defense that forces Woodbury's humiliating retreat. After a failed attempt to gain his way into the prison, by using Tyreese as a hostage and subsequently decapitating him with Michonne's katana, the Governor crushes the fences with a tank. A bloody massacre ensues, leading to a high death toll and ultimately making the prison less secure and less habitable.

Tensions steadily rise within the Governor's group, as their remaining ammunition is limited, and a handful of Woodbury residents' moral consciences come into play, especially regarding the killing of defenseless or young members of the prison group. Both factors lead to the remnants of the Governor's army turning on him, and to Lilly's killing him, throwing his corpse to the zombies, and making a last-ditch attempt to fortify the prison.

=== Television series ===
Before the outbreak, Philip and Brian Blake were raised by an abusive father. As an adult, Philip worked an office job with a boss he didn't get along with, was married, and had a daughter named Penny. Eighteen months before the outbreak, Philip lost his wife in a car accident. During the early days of the outbreak, Philip and Penny survived and found a community in Woodbury. Penny was bitten, however, and turned into a walker. Unable to accept her death, Philip locked her up in a private room in his office. When the community was leaderless, they picked Philip to lead and began calling him "the Governor", a nickname which stuck. Determined not to lose the community, he executed any outsider groups he saw as a threat. He allowed some smaller groups to move into Woodbury if he deemed them to be an asset and not a threat to his leadership, but still took precautions and had them monitored by his lieutenants until he deemed them trustworthy. At some point during the first or second season, the Governor encounters a dying Merle Dixon, whom the Governor enlists, along with Caesar Martinez and Milton Mamet, as his lieutenant and advisers. He also tasks Milton, a scientist, with researching a means to reverse the virus in the hopes of saving Penny. The Governor was also known to have had affairs with many of the Woodbury women.

==== Personality ====
The Governor is charming and charismatic, but also murderous, violent, sociopathic, power-hungry, completely sadistic, and horrifically ruthless. He sees himself as the community's only hope for survival, and is thus willing to imprison, abuse and/or kill anyone he sees as a threat to his authority; for him, torture and mass murder are a means to an end. One example of this is when he and his men massacre a group of National Guardsmen and take their supplies. Later, the Governor kidnaps Michonne and Hershel, attempting to lure out the inhabitants of the prison; ignoring Rick's pleas for coexistence, the Governor decapitates a bound Hershel. The prisoners open fire, and the Governor orders his men to kill everyone inside of the prison.

==== Season 3 ====
The Governor first appears in "Walk with Me", season 3, episode 3, having forcibly taken Andrea and Michonne from the woods after Merle discovers them near a downed military helicopter. Woodbury, under the Governor's rule, is a functioning community that even bears some resemblance to the world before the virus struck. The townspeople are unaware that the Governor and his men massacred a platoon of National Guardsmen to get their supplies. In the episode "Killer Within", the Governor befriends Andrea, and he reveals some of his past to her, including his real name. In the episode "Say the Word", it is shown that the Governor has a zombified daughter named Penny, whom he keeps hidden, feeds body parts to, and grooms affectionately while playing the lullaby "Bye, baby Bunting". The Governor allows Michonne to leave town, but she is unable to convince Andrea to leave with her. The Governor leads Andrea to a gathering for the townsfolk: a sparring match between Merle and Martinez surrounded by chained, toothless walkers. The spectacle shocks Andrea, who describes it as "barbaric", but the Governor insists it is "fun", and it teaches the residents to not be afraid. In the episode "Hounded", the Governor and Andrea begin a sexual relationship.

He sends Merle to find and kill Michonne, and although Merle fails to kill her, he returns with two captives, Glenn Rhee and Maggie Greene. In the episode "When the Dead Come Knocking", the Governor interrogates Maggie and leaves Glenn to be brutalized by Merle. When he threatens to shoot Glenn, Maggie gives the Governor the information about the prison and their group. In the mid-season finale, "Made to Suffer", during Rick Grimes's foray into Woodbury to rescue Glenn and Maggie, Michonne kills Penny. Enraged, the Governor attacks Michonne, and in self-defense she stabs him in the hand and the right eye with a glass shard. The Governor calls a town meeting, where he claims the town has been attacked by terrorists brought by Merle, and he brings forth Merle's brother Daryl Dixon in chains. The Governor orders them to fight to the death, and the town calls for their blood as a way to force the two brothers to fight each other.

In the mid-season premiere, "The Suicide King", the fight between Merle and Daryl is broken up when the prison group attacks, allowing the brothers to escape. The Governor withdraws to his apartment, and the town is in a state of unrest after the attack. Andrea confronts him about her friends' presence in town, and then goes out to calm and inspire the townspeople. In the episode "Home", the Governor asks Milton Mamet where his loyalties lie, and asks him to keep tabs on Andrea. The Governor and his men then attack the prison; Rick Grimes' group runs for cover, and gunfire erupts on both sides. When a herd of walkers charge through town, the Governor gleefully sprays machine gun fire in the air and then drives off as the survivors struggle with the walkers.

In the episode "I Ain't a Judas", the Governor proceeds to rally Woodbury against the prison survivors, labeling them terrorists and raiders. Andrea wants to leave to negotiate peace with the prison group, but the Governor discourages her, implying that she will not be welcomed back if she leaves. When Milton tells the Governor that Andrea asked him to help her sneak out, the Governor tells him to go with her. The Governor welcomes Tyreese, Sasha, Allen, and Ben to Woodbury, after Rick kicked them out of the prison. Andrea returns to Woodbury and warily resumes her place at the Governor's side. In the episode "Arrow on the Doorpost", encouraged by Andrea, the Governor meets with Rick in a secluded grain silo to offer him peace in exchange for turning over Michonne, giving him two days to think about it. The Governor returns to Woodbury and secretly orders Martinez to set an ambush at the barn, to kill all of Rick's group and bring Michonne to Woodbury so the Governor can torture her. In the episode "Prey", Andrea flees for the prison, and the Governor hunts her down personally, bringing her back to Woodbury and strapping her in the dentist's chair that he meant to use on Michonne. In the episode "This Sorrowful Life", Merle kidnaps Michonne at Rick's suggestion to turn her over to the Governor, but lets her go and instead lures walkers to the Governor's meeting place to ambush the Woodbury army. Then, the Governor maims, shoots, and kills Merle, leaving his body to reanimate as a walker, which Daryl later kills, out of pure anger, remorse, and pain.

In the season finale "Welcome to the Tombs", the Governor brutally beats Milton up after learning that he burned the walkers that the Governor had been corralling; he then orders him to kill Andrea. Milton tries in vain to kill the Governor, but the Governor stabs him and locks him in with Andrea, so that Milton will reanimate and kill Andrea. The Governor then leads his army into the prison to kill Rick's entire group, but Tyreese and Sasha want nothing to do with it, and stay behind at Woodbury. Rick and the others have set a trap at the prison, expecting the Woodbury army's arrival. Ambushed and outgunned by Maggie and Glenn, the Governor's army flees the prison in terror. The Governor stops the fast-fleeing convoy, and, in response to their protests against returning to the prison, he opens fire and slaughters them all, sparing only Martinez and Shumpert, his two primary henchmen. Only Karen escapes his rampage (by playing dead under a corpse). The Governor, Martinez, and Shumpert are last seen driving off as Rick and Tyreese bring everyone from Woodbury to the prison, and leave Woodbury to be overrun.

==== Season 4 ====
"Live Bait" reveals that, just after massacring his own people, the Governor sets up camp with Martinez and Shumpert. Martinez and Shumpert abandon him after he does nothing to protect himself from a walker, believing him to have lost his nerve. The next day the Governor drives back to Woodbury, which is overrun with walkers, and burns down the entire town. After several months alone, intentionally trying to let the walkers kill him, he finally collapses on the street. He looks up to see a young girl, about the same age as Penny, in the window of a nearby apartment building; he pulls himself back to his feet and investigates. He finds the Chambler family residing inside, consisting of sisters Lilly and Tara, their father David, and Lilly's daughter Meghan. Lilly and Tara initially hold the Governor at gunpoint, but they later confiscate his pistol and allow him to stay in an apartment across the hallway. After hearing about how the Governor has survived the last few months, they ask him his name. He tells them that it is "Brian Heriot", a name he saw painted on the side of a barn while staggering aimlessly through the countryside. He runs some errands for the family, and risks his life to get David two oxygen tanks from a walker-infested nursing home. When David dies and reanimates, the Governor saves the rest of the family by bashing in David's head with one of the oxygen tanks. After he buries David, he burns his photo of his wife and Penny. That night, he goes to the Chamblers to say goodbye, but Lilly insists that he stay. He and Lilly become lovers, and he saves Meghan when she falls into a pit of walkers, killing them with his bare hands. Moments later, he encounters Martinez and his group.

In the episode "Dead Weight", Martinez takes in the Governor, accepting his new facade as "Brian", and the girls and lets them join their camp. Among the camp are brothers Pete and Mitch Dolgen, who have a working tank. When it becomes clear that Martinez may not be able to keep them safe, the Governor kills him by throwing him into a pit of walkers. Pete takes command, but the Governor later kills him as well after he displays an inability to kill a group of other survivors to take their belongings. The Governor plans to rally the camp and use the tank in a second attack on the prison.

In the mid-season finale, "Too Far Gone", the Governor encounters Michonne and Hershel Greene and takes them hostage, intending to use them as leverage over Rick. The Governor then rallies the camp to take over the prison. Upon arriving at the prison with his army and tank, the Governor tells Rick that he is going to give their group a chance to leave without anyone getting killed. Rick says that they can co-exist peacefully, but the Governor calls him a liar and beheads Hershel. During the ensuing gunfight, Lilly arrives in time to see him murder Hershel. She is carrying Meghan, who has been bitten by a walker. He dispassionately shoots Meghan to prevent her from becoming a walker before ordering his people to kill everyone in the prison. The Governor uses the tank to roll over the fences and goes into the fight himself, only to be tackled by Rick. At that moment, Michonne stabs the Governor and leaves him to die. Lilly then shoots him in the head, killing him. His corpse is briefly visible at the beginning of "After," lying in the middle of the field with a bullet hole in his head.

==== Season 5 ====
In the mid-season premiere, "What Happened and What's Going On", the Governor appears, along with Beth Greene, Bob Stookey, Martin, and Lizzie and Mika Samuels, during Tyreese's hallucinations after Tyreese is bitten by a walker. While Beth, Bob, and the girls comfort Tyreese, the Governor taunts him about his past actions and inability to do what is "necessary". The Governor, especially, criticizes Tyreese's choices, particularly in forgiving Carol for murdering Karen. The Governor reminds Tyreese that he promised to do what it took to earn his keep, but he failed to adapt. However, Tyreese stands up and confronts him. However, the Governor "pushes" Tyreese to the ground while still pressing his point. Tyreese ultimately dies in peace, and the vision of the Governor fades away.

=== The Walking Dead: The Ones Who Live ===
The Governor briefly appears in Rick's flashbacks in the series finale as he talks with Major General Beale.

=== The Walking Dead: Destinies ===
The Governor appears as the leader of Woodbury, welcoming a suspicious Michonne to the town. Depending on the player's choice, the Governor ends up as either an ally or an enemy.

If the player decides to kill a zombified Penny Blake, the Governor loses an eye fighting with Michonne and pits Daryl in an arena fight to the death with either Merle or T-Dog depending on who was left behind by Rick in Atlanta near the start of the game. Later, the Governor leads an attack on the prison and fights Rick/Shane, ending in his defeat and decapitation, although the prison falls in the process.

If the player chooses not to have Michonne kill Penny, then either Merle or T-Dog overthrows the Governor and takes control of Woodbury. The Governor escapes to the prison where he joins Rick/Shane's group, expressing remorse for his actions. Instead of the Governor leading the later attack on the prison, it's Merle/T-Dog instead. The Governor survives the final battle and escapes with the fleeing prison residents.

== Casting and development ==
On television, the character is portrayed by British actor David Morrissey. Glen Mazzara, when asked about the character's direction for season 3 of the show, described the Governor as a narcissist who sees himself as the future savior of civilization and is willing to resort to the most extreme of measures to achieve his ultimate goal.

Despite making few appearances, the Governor's daughter, Penny, plays a key role in his mentality and actions. He secretly cares for the undead Penny in his apartment, as revealed in the episode "Say the Word", brushing her hair and singing to her, and tells Michonne that she does not need to suffer, implying that he believes Penny is still alive and is "under the grip of a terrible, terrible illness".

The Governor's eye patch in the television series was placed on the opposite side from that of his comic book counterpart.

Noel Murray of Rolling Stone ranked Philip 'the Governor' Blake 11th in a list of 30 best Walking Dead characters, saying, "Initially a somewhat one-dimensional sicko – whose virtues as a leader were counterbalanced by his deranged preoccupation with the undead – the eye-patch–rocking Blake lasted long enough to get beaten and to mount a comeback. The episode "Live Bait," where he rests and regroups, is a series high-point – humanizing an at-times inhuman creep courtesy of David Morrissey's ability to elicit sympathy and make you feel sick to you stomach simultaneously."

== Reception ==
In 2009, the Governor was ranked as IGN's 86th-greatest comic book villain of all time and was ranked #28 on TV Guide's list of 'The 60 Nastiest Villains of All Time'. David Morrissey has been well received for his performance as the Governor, and was nominated for Best Supporting Actor at the 39th Saturn Awards.
