= Milton Mamet =

Fictional character from the television series The Walking Dead

- The Walking Dead character
- Milton, as portrayed by Dallas Roberts in the television series.
- First appearance: "Walk with Me" (2012)
- Last appearance: "Welcome to the Tombs" (2013)
- Created by: Glen Mazzara; Evan Reilly
- Portrayed by: Dallas Roberts

In-universe information
- Occupation: Scientist

Milton Mamet is a fictional character from the American television series The Walking Dead and was portrayed by Dallas Roberts. He is an original character and has no comic counterpart in The Walking Dead comic book series.

== Character biography ==
=== Season 3 ===
Milton Mamet is a scientist who serves as one of the Governor's right-hand men. He knew Phillip Blake before he became "The Governor", and is thus one of the Governor's longest-lived pre-/post-apocalyptic associates. Although allied with the Governor, Milton is taken aback by Philip's violent methods. In the episode "Walk with Me", Milton studies the decapitated bodies of Michonne's walker-pets and informs the Governor that she had cut off their arms and teeth so they cannot attack and used them to walk among other walkers unseen. In the episode "Say the Word", Milton helps to wrangle captive walkers and one tries to bite him, but he is protected by duct tape that he wrapped around the sleeves of his jacket. In the episode "When the Dead Come Knocking", Milton tests, with Andrea assisting, the possibility of communication with the residual human consciousness believed to still exist in the undead. To this end, he repeatedly asks emotionally significant questions to Mr. Michael Coleman Sr., a voluntary test-subject dying of prostate cancer, in the hopes that after Coleman dies and reanimates, he may, despite his zombified state, initiate behavior that implies he understands and perhaps retains emotional reaction to the questions asked before death.

In the episode "Made to Suffer", Milton is seen at the Woodbury Army meeting, and later at the clinic with the Governor after his eye was gouged out by Michonne. In the episode "The Suicide King", he talks with Andrea to find out how many people were injured in the attack by the prison group, and later tries to calm the upset residents. In the episode "Home", the Governor orders Milton to keep tabs on Andrea. In the episode "I Ain't a Judas", Milton helps Andrea escape to make peace with Rick.

In the episode "Arrow on the Doorpost", Milton accompanies The Governor to a peace summit, in which the Governor and Rick Grimes are to come to peaceful compromise between Woodbury and the Prison. He expresses misgivings about The Governor's methods when he learns the Governor plans to kill everyone at the Prison save Michonne (whom he plans to brutally torture before death in retaliation for the loss of Penny and his eye). In the episode "Prey", Milton commands Andrea to escape to the Prison to warn her old team about the Governor's plans and for the first time, takes a direct stand against the Governor by burning the captured walkers the Governor planned to use against the Prison group. Andrea made the escape to the Prison but was chased and captured by the Governor himself. The Governor realizes Milton revealed his plans to Andrea; this creates a final rift between Milton and the Governor.

At the beginning of the Third Season finale, "Welcome to the Tombs", the Governor viciously beats Milton to a bloody pulp for this betrayal. Giving Milton a last chance to fall back into grace, he tasks Milton with the murder of a chair-bound Andrea, but Milton suddenly spins, knife in hand, to kill the Governor. The attempt is futile and one-sided: the Governor seizes the knife and mortally wounds Milton with several hard thrusts to the abdomen. The Governor locks Milton in the torture chamber with Andrea, deciding to let the reanimated Milton eat her. When ordered by the Governor before the stabbing to pick up the torture implements previously intended for Michonne, Milton surreptitiously leaves behind a pair of pliers behind the chair where Andrea sat, so that she could sweep them forward with her right foot, lift them with her toes, and use the pliers to remove the handcuffs binding her to the dentist chair. Milton orders Andrea to find a sharp tool to stab him in the head before he re-animates. As Milton sits dying against the wall, he asks Andrea why she came back to Woodbury after visiting her friends at the Prison and Andrea reveals her aborted assassination of the Governor as he slept. In the end, however, Andrea fails to free herself in time and a zombified Milton bites her before she permanently kills him. Rick's group, aided by Tyreese and Sasha, discovers the torture room, Milton's body, and a dying Andrea who soon after kills herself to prevent reanimation.

== Development and reception ==
The character of Milton was revealed by Entertainment Weekly on August 21, 2012. Milton was described as the "details guy" by Robert Kirkman. Milton and The Governor are described to be very close. Dallas Roberts said that if Milton had a weapon, it would likely be some sort of slingshot.

Zack Handlen, writing his review for "Walk with Me" in The A.V. Club, refers to Milton as the Governor's "pet scientist". In his review of "Say the Word", Handlen refers to the scene of Merle and Milton killing zombies as "a kind of alpha-male game". In his review of "When the Dead Come Knocking", Handlen comments on the scene involving Milton's attempts at communicating with Mr. Coleman after he turns, noting that it tells the viewer more about Milton than it does about the zombies: "Clearly, the Governor's people are already well aware that anyone who dies becomes a zombie, regardless of whether or not they were bit, but they don't seem to have taken that knowledge to heart. Milton spends weeks working with a man with prostate cancer, trying to instill a sort of sense memory around a series of questions in order to determine if anything of his mind remains after death. Unsurprisingly, it doesn't work, and it's only Andrea's quick reflexes that save Milton from having to test out his theories firsthand. It's not a bad scene, and there's undeniable sadness in hearing the list of family members Mr. Coleman, the soon to be dead man, has lost. But what's most revealing here is how Milton, and by extension the Governor, don't seem to have completely internalized the ramifications of the end of the world. Woodbury is lovely and all, but it can't last, especially not with these knuckleheads in charge. They think they can control what's happened, that it's just another hurdle in humanity's path, but that's dangerous positive thinking."

Keven Skinner of the website The Daily Blam! enjoyed the interaction between Milton and Hershel in "Arrow on the Doorpost", calling it "a cool scene to see two 'normal' people having a chat while two other guys are face-stabbing and head-smashing zombies". Zack Handlen called these scenes "small, effective scenes that help to remind us just how unreal all of this is, and how pointless any battle between Woodbury and the prison will be". Eric Goldman enjoyed the fact that Milton was fleshed out more in the episode "Prey". Zach Handlen commented that "Milton's humanitarian side has finally screamed loud enough for him to object to what’s going on" in "Prey", although "That's not enough for him to let Andrea kill the Governor while they're spying on him in his torture room, but it is enough to drive him to tell Andrea about the Michonne "deal," as well as the Governor's plans to betray Rick if he's stupid enough to take the offer. That's the straw that breaks Andrea's back, and it's also, apparently, enough to make Milton work against the Governor in his own way; in this case, that means burning the pit and van zombies Martinez had set aside from the prison assault. [...] And the final conversation between Milton and the Governor suggests that they both know the situation has changed. [...] The distrust between Milton and the Governor means that things are starting to collapse in earnest; plus, it's nice to see that Milton's conversation with Hershel pay off in a subtle way."

"Welcome to the Tombs" marks the final appearance of recurring actor Dallas Roberts, who portrays Milton. The on air portrayals of Milton and Andrea's deaths and the characters who discovered their bodies differ significantly from what was originally taped. Dallas Roberts and the scene's other actors had to fly back to the set to shoot the altered scene. As Roberts told Entertainment Weekly:

"Originally, the beating scene that started the episode wasn't there. Originally, I showed up and was led into the room where Andrea was and I took the tools out – the instruments of torture that were laid on the table — and then he shot me in the stomach, completely unexpectedly. And then I was left to bleed out in the same idea basically — you’re going to kill her now. There was a lot more of Milton trying to open the door and him trying to free her from the chains. And then there was a section where he was going to wrap the chain around the neck and try to choke her to death before he turned so she wouldn’t have to deal with Walker Milton, or Biter Milton, as it were.

"And then at the end of that, it was just Tyreese and someone else who found her. Rick and Daryl and Michonne weren’t there. So it was essentially the same idea, except you saw me taking chunks out of Laurie Holden in that version. And then they called us back a few months later to reshoot it and made all those changes. So now you’re not sure if I’ve gotten her until after that door opens, and I think that’s probably why they did it."

During a conference with Chad Coleman, it was revealed that initially, Tyreese and Sasha would find Andrea in the interrogation room at the end of Season 3, with Tyreese killing the reanimated Milton with his hammer. Though for story-telling reasons, the scene was cut.

Erik Kain of Forbes.com noted in his review of "Welcome to the Tombs" that "Many moments in the episode were great", especially the opening scene involving the Governor and Milton. HitFix writer Alan Sepinwall commented that Milton's research earlier in the season paid off: "When abstract theory turns into bloody reality, it becomes much easier for Milton to accept that no trace of humanity survives the transition into zombiehood, and Dallas Roberts played the hell out of Milton's desperation and acceptance of all the things he'd done wrong." Zack Handlen commented on the deaths of Andrea and Milton: "Of the two, I think I’ll miss Milton slightly more, mostly because it feels like he died just as he was getting interesting. After seeing this episode, it becomes obvious that his arc was supposed to be “man of science turning a blind eye until he realizes there are some lines he can't cross,” which wasn't really clear for a lot of the season. At first he was just a polite, slightly creepy guy, and then he disappeared for a while. He had a few good scenes overall, and it was nice to be surprised by someone acting in a positive manner for once, but now, he's dead, and a lot of potential has been lost."

Noel Murray of Rolling Stone ranked Milon Mamet 26th in a list of 30 best Walking Dead characters, saying, "An intelligent and curious man, i.e. more inclined to experiment on zombies than to skewer them, Mr. Mamet would've made a fine addition to anyone's post-apocalyptic crew. But he had the misfortune to throw in with a madman, and though he tried to broker some kind of a peace once he realized the extent of his boss' badness, the effort came too late."
