= Jose Pablo Cantillo =

American actor

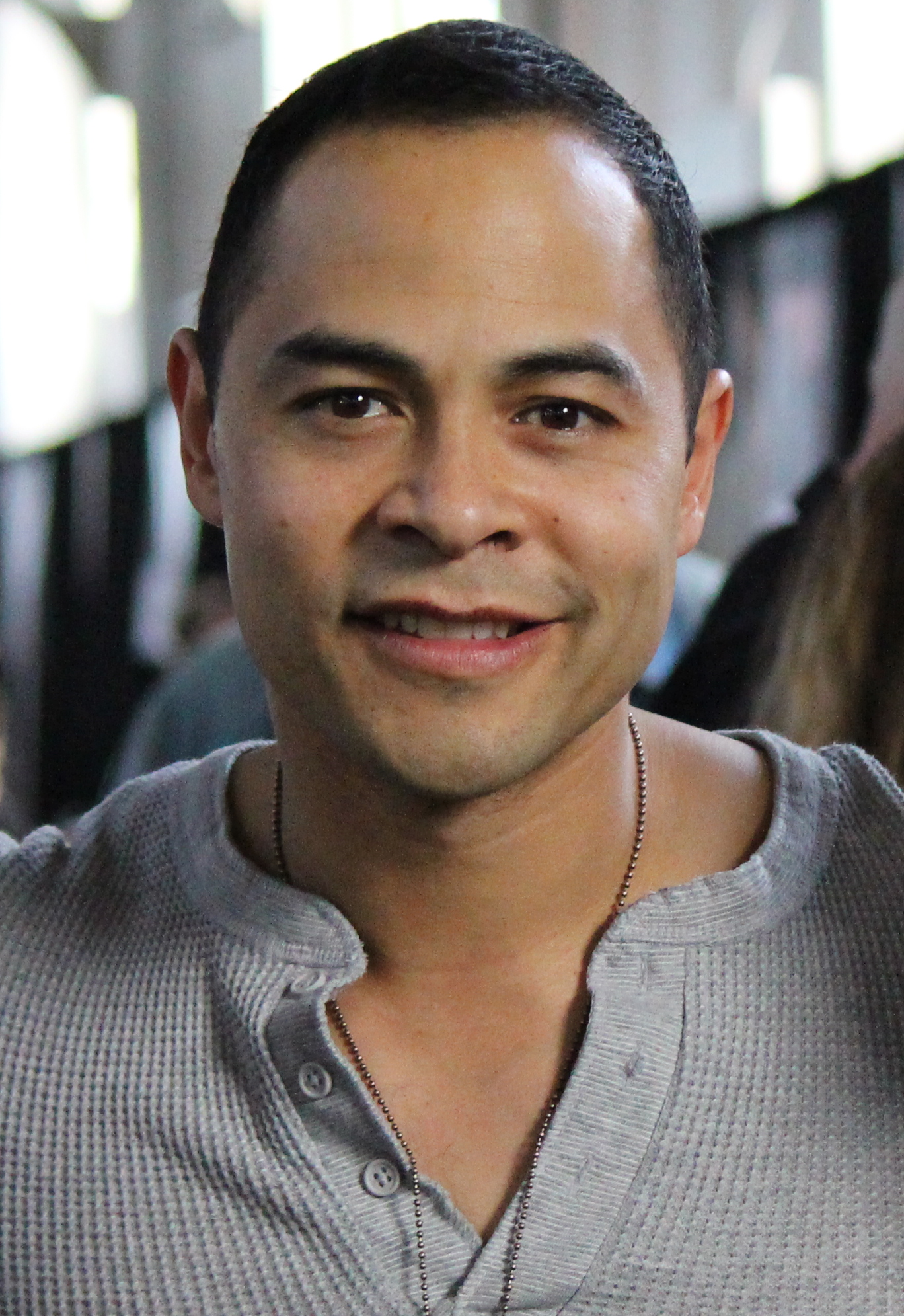
- Cantillo at Walker Stalker Con, San Francisco, February 2015
- Born: 1978 or 1979 (age 46–47)
- Occupation: Actor
- Years active: 2003–present
- Spouse: Kristi Cantillo
- Children: 1

Jose Pablo Cantillo (born 1978 or 1979) is an American actor. He is best known for playing Ricky Verona in Crank, Miguel in Cleaner (2007), Pepe in Streets of Blood (2011), Detective Martinez in El Chicano (2018), Hector Salazar in FX's Sons of Anarchy, Caesar Martinez in AMC's The Walking Dead, Duff in Standoff, and Dave in Taken (2017).

== Early life ==
The son of Costa Rican parents, Roberto Cantillo and Rita Bolaños, Jose Pablo Cantillo (known as "Joey" in his high school days) grew up in Terre Haute, Indiana and attended Terre Haute South Vigo High School where he was a tennis standout for all four years, leading the Terre Haute South Braves to a State Runner-Up finish in 1996. He graduated from Indiana University Bloomington in 2003 with a double major in marketing and finance from the Kelley School of Business.

== Career ==
Cantillo decided to pursue an acting career in New York City after taking some drama classes at IU. In late 2003, he moved to California.

After acting in Off-Broadway plays in New York, Cantillo has landed guest roles on popular television series since early 2000. He played a recurring role in The Walking Dead as Caesar Martinez, and roles in two of Neill Blomkamp's films, the science fiction action thriller Elysium (2013) and Chappie (2015). In 2019, he played the role of Detective Martinez in the "Latino superhero movie" El Chicano.

== Personal life ==
In late 2003, Cantillo moved to California with his wife Kristi and their 7-year-old daughter. They live in Santa Clarita, a town that Cantillo described to an interviewer as “kind of reminds us of Terre Haute”, his hometown.

== Filmography ==
=== Film ===
Year	Title	Role	Notes
2004	The Manchurian Candidate	Villalobos	
2005	Shackles	Gabriel Garcia	Video
2006	The Bondage	Spider	
2006	Crank	Ricky Verona	
2007	After Sex	Marco	
2007	Disturbia	Officer Gutierrez	
2007	Cleaner	Miguel	
2008	Redbelt	Snowflake	
2009	Crank: High Voltage	Ricky Verona	
2009	Virtuality	Manny Rodriguez	TV movie
2009	Streets of Blood	Pepe	Video
2012	Talhotblond	Wilkes	TV movie
2012	Girl in Tank	-	Short
2012	American Citizen	Young Frank Ruiz	Short
2013	Elysium	Sandro	
2015	Chappie	Yankie (Amerika)	
2015	Solace	Sawyer	
2015	Man Down	2nd Lt. Taylor	
2016	Seed	Tim	Short
2017	Zygote	Quinn	Short
2018	El Chicano	Detective Martinez	
2018	No Apologies	Irish Joe	TV movie
2019	A. I. Tales	Tim	
2021	Cherry	Drill Sgt. Deco	
2021	Copshop	Officer Peña	
2022	Ambulance	Jesus	

=== Television ===
Year	Title	Role	Notes
2003	Law & Order: Criminal Intent	Jack Martinez	Episode: "Baggage"
2003	Law & Order: Special Victims Unit	Wilberto 'Wille' Angel	Episode: "Rotten"
2004	ER	Juan Enriquez	Episode: "Intern's Guide to the Galaxy"
2005	CSI: Miami	Juan Fernandez	Episode: "One Night Stand"
2005	Medical Investigation	Rick Hain	Episode: "Survivor"
2005	Crossing Jordan	Danny Artega	Episode: "Sanctuary"
2005	Nip/Tuck	Marlon Ramirez	Episode: "KiKi"
2005	Eyes	Francisco Lopez	Episode: "Poison"
2006	Bones	Jose Vargas	Episode: "The Woman in the Garden"
2006–07	Standoff	Duff Gonzalez	Main cast
2007	The Unit	Rock	Episode: "Binary Explosion"
2008	Monk	Carlos	Episode: "Mr. Monk Is on the Run: Part 2"
2008	CSI: Crime Scene Investigation	I.A. Officer Galvez	Episode: "The Theory of Everything"
2008	The Shield	Amando Rios	Episode: "Genocide" & "Animal Control"
2009	The Closer	Enrique Santos	Episode: "Half Load"
2009	Lie To Me	Amadeo Valadez	Episode: "Fold Equity"
2010	Hawthorne	Manny Rodriguez	Episode: "No Excuses"
2010	Dark Blue	Raphael Garza	Episode: "Shelter of the Beast"
2010	Lone Star	Matt	Episode: "Pilot"
2010	Terriers	Felipe Prado	Episode: "Agua Caliente"
2010	Sons of Anarchy	Hector Salazar	Recurring cast: Season 3
2010	The Good Guys	Santora	Episode: "Cop Killer"
2011	Law & Order: LA	Cesar Vargas	Episode: "Zuma Canyon"
2012	The River	Manny Centeno	Episode: "Peaches" & "Doctor Emmet Cole"
2012	The Finder	Luis Obispo	Episode: "Voodoo Undo"
2012–13	The Walking Dead	Caesar Martinez	Recurring cast: Season 3, guest: Season 4
2013	The Mentalist	Angel	Episode: "Wedding in Red"
2013	Twisted Tales	Ricardo	Episode: "Cached"
2014	Rush	–	Episode: "We Are Family"
2014–15	Constantine	Hugo Lopez	Episode: "The Saint of Last Resorts 1 & 2"
2015	Tales of Halloween	Dutch	Episode: "The Ransom of Rusty Rex"
2016	Damien	Alex	Episode: "Seven Curses"
2016	Shooter	Justin Singer	Episode: "Killing Zone" & "Danger Close"
2017	Taken	Dave	Main cast: season 1
2018	The Last Ship	Octavio	Recurring cast: season 5
2019	The Rookie	Franco DeSantis	Episode: "Caught Stealing"
2019	S.W.A.T.	Ricardo Fuentes	Episode: "Lion's Den"
2021	Coyote	Javi Lopez	Episode: "Sin of Origin"
2021	Magnum P.I.	Mitch Desanto	Episode: "Someone to Watch Over Me"
2021–22	Mayor of Kingstown	Carlos Jiménez	Recurring cast
2022	NCIS	DEA Agent Mark Sisco	Episode: "Thick as Thieves"
