= Rohn Schmidt =

American cinematographer and television director

- Other name: Ronn Schmidt
- Occupations: Cinematographer, television director
- Years active: 1987–present
- Website: www.rohnschmidt.com

Rohn Schmidt, sometimes credited as Ronn Schmidt, is an American cinematographer and television director.

== Life and career ==
Schmidt was educated at the Brooks Institute and the AFI Conservatory.

He worked as a cinematographer on number of films including Beastmaster 2: Through the Portal of Time (1991), Men of War (1994), Lord of Illusions (1995), Star Kid (1997) and The Mist (2007).

He also worked as a cinematographer on the television series Huff, Memphis Beat, The Chicago Code, The Walking Dead and The Shield, he made his directorial debut on the latter series. His other directing credits include Saving Grace and Stargate Universe.
