= Glen Mazzara =

American television producer and writer (born 1967)

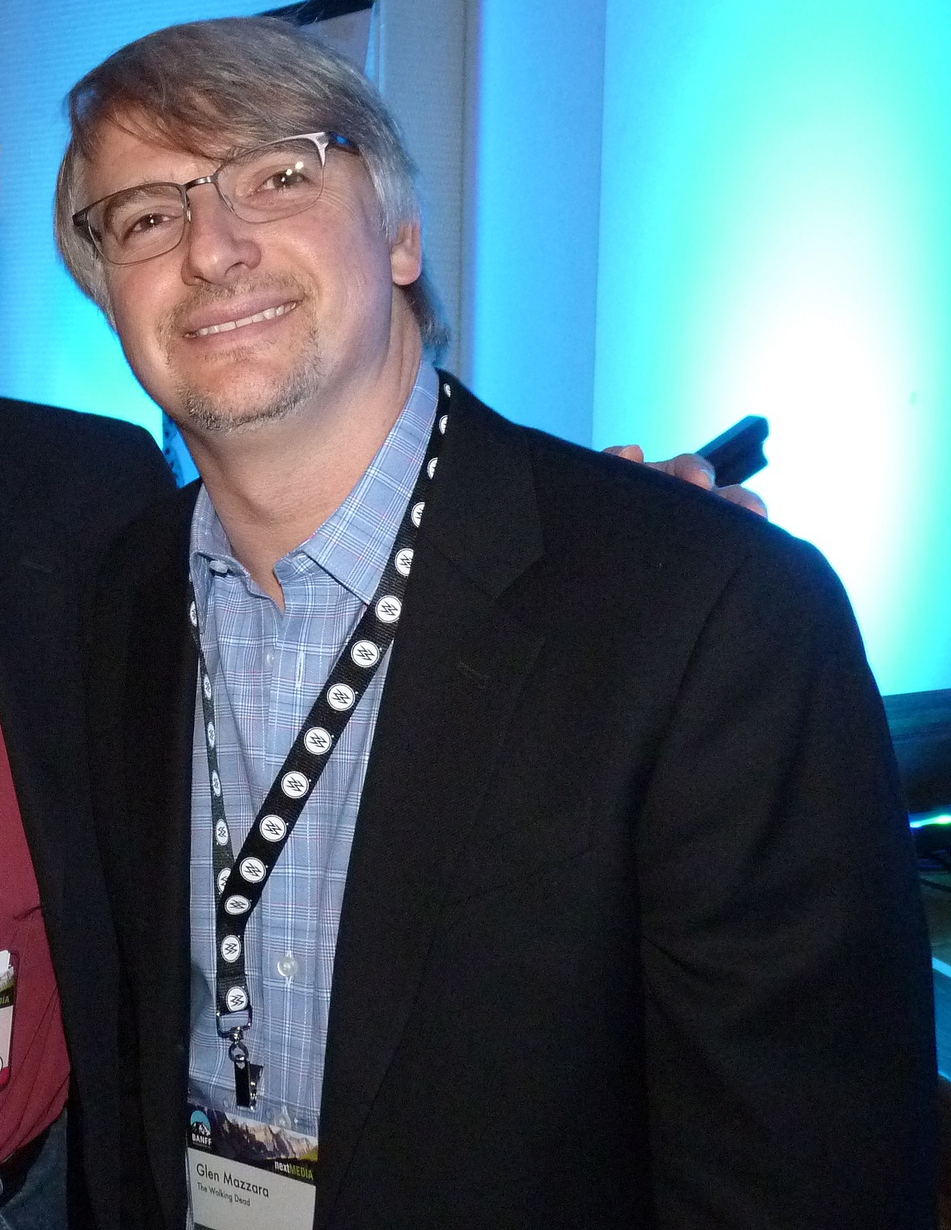
- Mazzara at Banff World Media Festival (2012)
- Born: July 6, 1967 (age 59); New York City, U.S.
- Occupations: Television writer, producer
- Years active: 1998–present
- Notable work: The Shield; The Walking Dead

Glen Mazzara (born July 6, 1967) is an American television producer and writer. He is best known for his work on The Shield, The Walking Dead and Damien.

== Life and career ==
An Italian-American, Mazzara was born in Manhattan, New York City, and grew up in Queens. He graduated from St. Francis Preparatory School in 1985. He attended NYU and earned a masters in English. He worked as a hospital administrator in New York before moving to Los Angeles to pursue a career as a writer in 1998.

He was a story editor and writer for the fourth and fifth seasons of Nash Bridges. In 2002, he joined the drama series The Shield as an executive story editor and writer for its first season; was promoted to producer for the second season while continuing to write, to supervising producer for the third season, to co-executive producer for the fourth season and to executive producer for the fifth season; and left midway through the sixth season in 2006. Later in 2006 he was an executive producer on the short-lived series Standoff, and then a co-executive producer on the first season of NBC drama Life.

Mazzara left Life to create and executive produce a new series Crash, based on the Oscar-winning film of the same name, on which he served as head writer and showrunner. He left after one season, but was credited as a consulting producer for the second season premiere.

In 2009, he joined the medical drama series Hawthorne for two seasons as executive producer and writer. In 2010, he wrote the teleplay for an episode of the AMC series The Walking Dead, "Wildfire". On July 27, 2011, it was reported that Mazzara had taken over as showrunner of The Walking Dead after Frank Darabont dropped out of the position. Mazzara left this role following season 3. After The Walking Dead, he signed an overall deal with Fox Television Studios in 2013.

Glen Mazzara is the Creator, Executive Producer, and Showrunner of A&E's series, Damien, based on the classic horror film, The Omen.

On April 15, 2019, Mazzara joined several other writers in firing their agents as part of the WGA's stand against the ATA and the practice of packaging.

== Filmography ==
=== Producer ===
Year	Show	Role
2002–2006	The Shield	Executive story editor (2002); Producer (2003); Supervising producer (2004); Co-executive producer (2005); Executive producer (2006–07)
2006	Standoff	Executive producer
2007	Life	Co-executive producer
2008–2009	Crash	Creator; Executive producer (2008); Consulting producer (2009)
2009–2010	Hawthorne	Executive producer
2011	Criminal Minds: Suspect Behavior	Consulting producer
2011–2013	The Walking Dead	Executive producer
2016	Damien	Creator; Executive producer
2022-present	The Rookie	Consulting Producer

=== Writer ===
Year	Show	Notes
1998–2000	Nash Bridges	6 episodes
2002–2007	The Shield	16 episodes
2006	Standoff	Episode: "Life Support"
2007	Life	Episode: "Let Her Go"
2008	Crash	Episode: "Episode One"
2009	Hawthorne	3 episodes
2010–2013	The Walking Dead	8 episodes
2011	Criminal Minds: Suspect Behavior	2 episodes
2016	Damien	3 episodes
2022-2024	The Rookie	3 episodes
