= Say the Word (The Walking Dead) =

- The Walking Dead episode
- Andrea watches in horror as the town of Woodbury cheer a fight between Merle and Martinez.
- Episode no.: Season 3 Episode 5
- Directed by: Greg Nicotero
- Written by: Angela Kang
- Cinematography by: Rohn Schmidt
- Editing by: Nathan D. Gunn
- Original air date: November 11, 2012

Guest appearances
- Emily Kinney as Beth Greene; Lew Temple as Axel; Dallas Roberts as Milton Mamet; Jose Pablo Cantillo as Caesar Martinez; Lawrence Kao as Tim; Vincent M. Ward as Oscar

Episode chronology
← Previous "Killer Within"	Next → "Hounded"
- The Walking Dead season 3

"Say the Word" is the fifth episode of the third season of the post-apocalyptic horror television series The Walking Dead. It was written by Angela Kang and directed by Greg Nicotero, and originally aired on AMC in the United States on November 11, 2012.

== Plot ==
=== Prison ===
Rick is traumatized after the death of his wife Lori during childbirth, and abandons his responsibility as both a parent to his new daughter and the other members of the group, instead releasing his anger on walkers. Daryl steps up as an interim leader, and offers to go with Maggie to locate infant formula and other supplies for the newborn. Glenn, Axel, and Oscar dig graves for their fallen, Lori, and T-Dog; Glenn remains resentful towards the prisoners Axel and Oscar due to losing his friends as a result of their fellow prisoner Andrew's sabotage. Glenn then goes to look for Rick in the prison tunnels, who is still mindlessly killing walkers. Glenn tries to convince Rick to return with him, but Rick throws him against the wall and Glenn, recognizing that Rick is in a dangerous head space, decides to leave Rick alone. Daryl and Maggie successfully recover supplies from an abandoned daycare center, and they see to tending to the newborn. Daryl asks Carl what to name his sister, and Carl considers the names of those that they have already lost. Daryl later visits Carol's makeshift grave, placing a Cherokee Rose to honor her memory.

Rick has found the boiler room where Lori died, finding a bloated walker inside with no trace of Lori's body. Believing the walker had eaten her corpse, Rick proceeds to execute it, and considers opening it up to look for Lori's corpse but forgoes that. As he sits in the boiler room, thinking to himself, the phone in the room suddenly rings. He goes to answer it.

=== Woodbury ===
The town prepares for a celebration as directed by The Governor. Michonne, still suspicious of The Governor, attempts to retrieve her katana from his quarters. After getting her katana, she is forced to hide as The Governor returns and overhears Milton warn The Governor that his celebration will delay his experiments. She opts to exit out a back window to avoid being caught and discovers a courtyard with several cages filled with walkers. She proceeds to open the cages and methodically kill them. However, she is caught and taken to The Governor, who orders her to become part of the "research team". This team, including Milton and Merle, is tasked to bring still-animated walkers that are trapped in pits back to Woodbury.

The Governor speaks to Andrea regarding Michonne, warning her that she is creating tension in Woodbury. Michonne again tries to convince Andrea to leave with her; Andrea believes that The Governor will not let them go willingly, but is surprised that Merle allows them to freely leave the town. Andrea wavers, and opts not to leave, unwilling to spend another eight months surviving for her life. Michonne decides to leave on her own. That evening, The Governor has Andrea join them to watch Merle spar against Martinez while surrounded by chained walkers. Andrea considers the event barbaric, but The Governor insists it teaches the townspeople to not be afraid.

== Reception ==
=== Critical response ===
The episode was generally well received. Zack Handlen, writing for The A.V. Club, gave the episode a 'B' on a scale from 'A' to 'F'. He highlighted the "feverish intensity" of Rick's speechless rampage, but he reserved some criticism for uninteresting characters and the "pretty anticlimactic" reveal of Woodbury's festivities. Eric Goldman at IGN gave the episode an 8.5 out of 10, praising the development of Woodbury, The Governor, Rick, Daryl, and Michonne in this episode. Both Handlen and Goldman singled out Glenn's dialogue with Hershel as a weak point, saying that Glenn's dialogue was too straightforward and his description of T-Dog's unseen heroism was "near self-parody".

=== Ratings ===
Upon its initial broadcast on November 11, 2012, "Say the Word" was watched by an estimated 10.37 million viewers, increasing in roughly a million viewers from the previous episode.
