= Chupacabra (The Walking Dead) =

- The Walking Dead episode
- While injured, Daryl hallucinates his missing brother, Merle.
- Episode no.: Season 2 Episode 5
- Directed by: Guy Ferland
- Written by: David Leslie Johnson
- Cinematography by: Rohn Schmidt
- Editing by: Nathan D. Gunn
- Original air date: November 13, 2011
- Running time: 43 minutes

Guest appearances
- IronE Singleton as Theodore "T-Dog" Douglas; Madison Lintz as Sophia Peletier; Lauren Cohan as Maggie Greene; Michael Rooker as Merle Dixon; Emily Kinney as Beth Greene; Scott Wilson as Hershel Greene; Jane McNeill as Patricia; Adam Minarovich as Ed Peletier; James Allen McCune as Jimmy

Episode chronology
| ← Previous "Cherokee Rose" | Next → "Secrets" |
- The Walking Dead season 2

"Chupacabra" is the fifth episode of the second season of the post-apocalyptic horror television series The Walking Dead. It originally aired on AMC in the United States on November 13, 2011. In the episode, Daryl Dixon (Norman Reedus), delusional from being wounded in a search mission, desperately tries to return to the Greene farm. Meanwhile, Glenn (Steven Yeun) unravels a secret that could endanger the survivors.

== Plot ==
In the opening flashback, Lori and Shane, escaping to a refugee center at the onset of the walker epidemic, watch in horror as military helicopters drop napalm on Atlanta.

In the present, the survivors continue their search for the missing Sophia. Hershel expresses his concern to Rick that his group has gotten too comfortable on his farmlands. Hershel is particularly concerned on how close Glenn and his daughter Maggie appear to be. Meanwhile, Glenn accidentally learns Lori is pregnant, and she asks him to keep it a secret from Rick.

During a search party, Shane tells Rick the search is pointless and they should continue on to Fort Benning. Rick later confides in Lori that Shane may be right. Lori privately confronts Shane, reminding him that her and Carl's well-being are no longer his problem.

Daryl goes out on horseback searching for Sophia, eventually coming across her doll in a river bed. As he follows the river, a snake frightens his horse and he is thrown, and is severely wounded by one of his crossbow bolts in the fall. He starts to hallucinate his missing brother Merle, who berates him for spending more time searching for Sophia than him. Daryl wakes in time to find a walker chewing on his shoe; he quickly dispatches it and another approaching walker, and takes their ears as a trophy necklace.

Daryl limps towards the farm, and from a distance, is mistaken as a walker; Andrea shoots him, grazing his head and knocking him unconscious. Rick reaches Daryl first, and hides the walker ear necklace before Hershel can see it. Daryl is treated and when he wakes, tells Carol what he had found, for which she is grateful.

Carol and Lori attempt to repay Hershel for his hospitality by cooking dinner, but tensions remain high. Maggie discreetly passes Glenn a note asking him when they can have sex again. However, both Hershel and Dale Horvath witness this. Glenn writes a reply and returns the note. After dinner, Maggie reads Glenn's reply and is horrified as he promised to wait in the barn for her. She rushes to try to stop him but is too late as Glenn discovers the barn is filled with walkers.

== Production ==
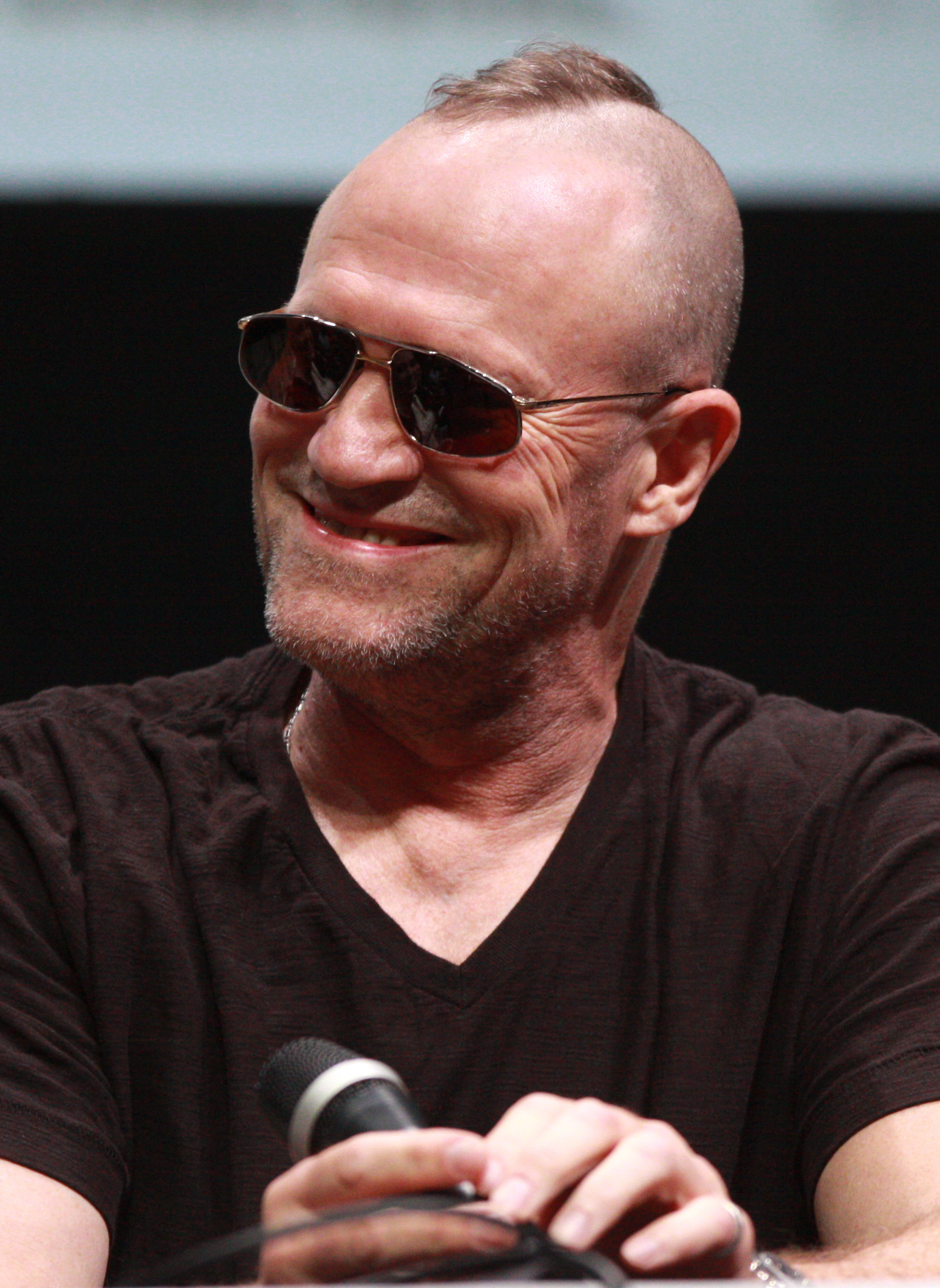
Michael Rooker made a guest appearance on the show.

"Chupacabra" was directed by Guy Ferland and written by David Leslie Johnson. The episode features the return of Michael Rooker as Merle Dixon, who last made an appearance on the season one episode "Tell It to the Frogs". Rooker confirmed his appearance at the 2011 Aliens to Zombies Convention at the Hollywood Roosevelt Hotel in Hollywood, California. "Nobody expected this level of Merle worship," he articulated. "He's such an out-there, crazy, anything goes kind of guy. There's an uncertainty about Merle—like he'll come back when you least expect it. He's the boogeyman, and viewers love that suspense. The number one question I'm asked is, 'When is your character coming back?' I can't say when, but I promise it’ll be a wild ride." Writer Robert Kirkman insisted that Rooker was a delight during production, and hoped that he would regularly appear on The Walking Dead.

"Chupacabra" further analyzes the development of Daryl Dixon. In the episode, Daryl continues to search for Sophia; eventually he lies deliriously on a riverbank, where he simultaneously hallucinates his missing brother Merle. Kirkman stated that he established Daryl as the survivalist of the group.

It’s nice seeing Daryl out there on his own. We established early on that he is the survivalist of the group and also it’s interesting that this guy who does seem to be a bit of prickly pear is the one that is throwing himself gung-ho into this mission of searching for Sofia. So it is nice to see a little bit of a soft side to him. But at the same time, you’re watching him cut zombies’ ears off and making a necklace out of them, which is a little bizarre.

== Reception ==
=== Critical response ===
Eric Goldman of IGN gave a favourable review of the episode, praising the development of Daryl Dixon and the performance of Norman Reedus, although he criticized the slow pace at the Greene farm. Overall, he gave the episode a 7.5 out of ten, a "good" rating.

=== Ratings ===
Upon its initial broadcast on November 13, 2011, "Chupacabra" was watched by estimated 6.12 million viewers, down slightly from the previous episode.
