= The Walking Dead: Survival Instinct =

2013 video game

- Promotional poster featuring characters Daryl Dixon and his brother Merle
- Developer: Terminal Reality
- Publisher: Activision
- Director: Angel Gonzalez Jr.
- Producers: Chris Harvey; Dino Verano; Matt Hohl
- Designer: Glenn Gamble
- Artists: Glenn Gamble; Michael Paskar; Austin Cline; Grant Gosler
- Writers: Drew Haworth; Morley Nelson
- Composer: Gordy Haab
- Series: The Walking Dead
- Engine: Infernal Engine
- Platforms: Microsoft Windows, PlayStation 3, Wii U, Xbox 360
- Release: NA: March 19, 2013; AU: March 21, 2013; EU: March 22, 2013
- Genre: First-person shooter
- Mode: Single-player

The Walking Dead: Survival Instinct is a 2013 first-person shooter game developed by Terminal Reality and published by Activision. It is based on The Walking Dead television series. The game acts as a prequel to the TV series; it is set in the Georgia countryside, and focuses on Daryl and Merle Dixon as they make their way to Atlanta during the early days of the zombie (Walker) apocalypse.

The Walking Dead: Survival Instinct was released for PlayStation 3, Wii U, Windows, and Xbox 360 in March 2013. The game received generally negative reviews from critics, with criticisms mainly directed to the game's graphics, controls, and plot.

== Gameplay ==
In The Walking Dead: Survival Instinct, the player controls Daryl Dixon from a first-person perspective, who can either fight the walkers or stealthily sneak past them. As he travels, he meets other survivors, who can either help or leave. He will have to be cautious of how much fuel, ammo and food he has, and think very strategically of who and how many he chooses to take in to his group. When he travels, he can either choose to take the highway, and save fuel but break down a lot, or take the small roads, where he will be able to scavenge from small villages and chance of breaking down is low. He can also change the vehicle he is using, ranging from a small truck to an SUV. The vehicles use up fuel which Dixon has to watch over. When he runs out of fuel, he must stop at various roadsides to scavenge jerry cans of fuel.

== Plot ==
In the midst of a zombie outbreak and shortly after the death of Daryl Dixon's father, Will Dixon, Daryl and his half-uncle Jess Collins escape their mountain shelter in Cabot Ridge to gather supplies in the nearby town of Sedalia. During the scavenger hunt for fuel, Daryl meets Jimmy Blake, the last standing police officer of Sedalia who requests that Daryl find radio batteries to call for help and a ride out of town, in exchange for sniper support. In a nearby gas station, Daryl meets Warren Bedford, who gives fuel to Daryl under the condition he join the group. The quartet then escapes with the newly acquired fuel, this time heading to Pemberton.

Upon entering Pemberton, Jess continues to get weaker from a bite he suffered in the mountains, and the truck they took is about to die out. At the campgrounds, Daryl meets deputy Lee, who gives Daryl a shotgun and asks him to look for a park ranger in order to get car keys to another vehicle. When looking for the ranger, Daryl hears a girl calling for help over a radio. Daryl also finds that the ranger has turned into a walker already. In the aftermath, Jess succumbs to the bite and reanimates.

Shortly after arriving at a town called Fontana to look for his brother Merle Dixon, Daryl hears gunshots from a building. When Daryl enters a diner, two survivors are being surrounded by walkers, which Daryl kills before talking to them. A woman called Scout and her partner Noah who was injured by an unknown sniper asks Daryl to check the movie theater for another survivor named Mia in exchange for one of their bags of supplies. After finding Mia alive, Daryl returns to the diner for the bag only to realize that Scout and Noah ran off to Memorial Hospital with the bags, yet gives him keys to another car. When Daryl arrives at the police station, the unknown shooter was revealed to be Merle, who was shooting at civilians under the guise of trying to protect himself from U.S. soldiers attempting to bring him back to prison. Merle joins the group and demands to go to a bar called Jake's as their next destination.

When Daryl questions Merle's reason to go to Jake's, Merle tells him he kept something of Daryl's at the bar. After arriving at the bar, Merle instructs Daryl to stay by the car but Daryl goes and looks for his brother anyway. It is revealed that Merle really went back to get revenge on the gang that sold him out and took Daryl's crossbow. Merle attacks some of them in the bar, until the rest of the gang comes back and knocks Daryl out, taking all of his equipment and supplies. However, an undead gang member has Daryl's crossbow. Daryl takes the crossbow and continues to look for Merle, the gang, and his missing equipment. Afterwards, Daryl finds out that Merle had gone missing while the entire gang was killed and eaten by walkers.

Before leaving, Daryl runs into Scout whose real name is Anna Turner and contacts her father John, a sheriff, and plans on meeting at the evacuation point at Palmetto Estates. After arriving at Danvers research lab for the serum (a supposed cure), Daryl fights his way through the lab and finds a woman named Sheila Schneider, who was a member of the Archer Creek Dam group. Sheila tells Daryl that the serum is just a fairy tale, and there is no cure. The lab is locked down by the automatic security system and Daryl tells Anna to flip the alarm switch, which actually ends up accidentally triggering the alarm. After escaping the lab, Daryl and Anna go to Sherwood to gather information about the evacuation. Daryl later says goodbye to Anna when she and her father find each other and drive away.

While scavenging the area, Daryl finds two elderly survivors, Terry Harrison and his wife, who is bedridden and in bad condition. Harrison is taking care of his wife, though he is concerned for his daughters, Amy and Andrea. He tells Daryl to find Aiden, who was in charge of signaling an evacuation helicopter. He also asks Daryl to get antibiotics from the pharmacy to ease his wife's suffering. Daryl finds Aiden's wife, Jane, who tells Daryl to look for her husband in the pharmacy. Daryl finds Aiden who has apparently twisted his ankle, stuck on the roof of the pharmacy. Aiden tells Daryl that, to signal the evac chopper, he must retrieve his bag from a garage, as the bag has flares that can be used to signal the helicopter. Daryl retrieves and brings it to Aiden, who starts the evacuation. Daryl then returns to the neighborhood where Terry, his wife, and Jane are located. When he arrives, Aiden tells Daryl the choppers have arrived but instead they only grab Aiden and takeoff despite his pleas to wait for the others. Daryl is forced to choose between them as both of their houses are under attack by walkers. The survivor that Daryl chooses to save then tells him that the last evacuation site is Atlanta, at the Firesign Stadium.

Daryl and his remaining survivors continue to the stadium but find it overrun by walkers. Daryl tries to reach various helicopters, but they take off before he can get on, until only one is left, which is problematically surrounded by walkers. Daryl holds off the horde with an M2 Browning mounted on a Humvee that is driven by Merle, who returns. After defending the helicopter, Daryl attempts to get on but is held back by Merle, who tells him the pilot was bitten. The survivors, who have already boarded the helicopter, are left to their fates.

== Development and release ==
In The Walking Dead: Survival Instinct, Norman Reedus and Michael Rooker reprise their television roles as Daryl and Merle Dixon, respectively.

During each of the first eight episodes of the TV series' third season, three code words per episode were shown during the commercial breaks which could be entered for a limited time at amcdead.com for the Dead Giveaway / The Survive And Drive Sweepstakes. Each week a winner won the opportunity to be featured in the game. Each weekly winner's headshot would be incorporated into a fictional character in the game and used in one of eight "death vignettes."

== Reception ==
Reception

Aggregate scores
Aggregator	Score
GameRankings	(X360) 35.39% (PS3) 33.33% (PC) 32.62% (WIIU) 30.50%
Metacritic	(PC) 38/100 (PS3) 34/100 (X360) 32/100

Review scores
Publication	Score
Game Informer	5/10
GameSpot	4/10
Giant Bomb	1/5
IGN	4.5/10
PlayStation Official Magazine – UK	3/10
Official Xbox Magazine (UK)	3/10
Official Xbox Magazine (US)	4.5/10
Polygon	3/10
Digital Spy	2/5

The Walking Dead: Survival Instinct was panned by critics, citing broken gameplay mechanics, poor graphics and "bland" environments, a lack of meaningful storyline, and for not meeting the high expectations associated with its source material. The game received "generally unfavorable" reviews from critics, according to review aggregator website Metacritic.

Although feeling that its "no thrills approach to zombie [first-person shooter] games and its emphasis on stealth and non-firearm weaponry (in comparison to other franchises such as Dead Rising and Left 4 Dead) "[wasn't] necessarily a bad thing", Computer & Video Games criticized Survival Instinct for being a "shoddy squandering of one of entertainment's hottest licenses", citing its "archaic" design, broken, slow-paced gameplay with inconsistent level behaviors, and its "atrocious" graphical quality.

Writing for Giant Bomb, Alex Navarro was even more harsh, believing that in comparison to Telltale's The Walking Dead game, "nothing about Survival Instinct feels properly executed, let alone coherent or thoughtful." Of particular criticism was its gameplay mechanics, the requirement to perform resource gathering and side missions at "the same handful of recycled environments" between story missions, and for providing "no meaningful information or commentary on the characters it revolves around." Giving the game one star, he concluded that Survival Instinct was "an abysmally rushed game of barely connected ideas that brings the player little more than frustration and disappointment." Considering it to be an example of licensed video games that are "lazy, cheap cash-grab[s]", Polygon compared playing Survival Instinct to "listening to a roomful of barely competent musicians, each of whom is playing a completely different song. And every once in a while one kicks you in the groin. Also, you have a sunburn."

During a Reddit AMA session, The Walking Dead creator Robert Kirkman distanced himself from Survival Instinct due to its negative reception, citing his more direct involvement in the Telltale game, and remarking that "I'm pretty sure there's an AMC logo before the title of that game and not a picture of my face. If there was a picture of my face in front of the logo, then I'd be completely responsible for that." Kirkman, however, felt that the ability to play as Daryl was "at least cool".
