= Hounded (The Walking Dead) =

- The Walking Dead episode
- Rick speaks to "other survivors" on the phone.
- Episode no.: Season 3 Episode 6
- Directed by: Dan Attias
- Written by: Scott M. Gimple
- Cinematography by: Rohn Schmidt
- Editing by: Robert Bramwell
- Original air date: November 18, 2012

Guest appearances
- Emily Kinney as Beth Greene; Alexa Nikolas as Haley; Emma Bell as Amy (voice); Andrew Rothenberg as Jim (voice); Jeryl Prescott Sales as Jacqui (voice); Arthur Bridgers as Crowley; Dave Davis as Gargulio; Lawrence Kao as Tim; Vincent M. Ward as Oscar

Episode chronology
← Previous "Say the Word"	Next → "When the Dead Come Knocking"
- The Walking Dead season 3

"Hounded" is the sixth episode of the third season of the post-apocalyptic horror television series The Walking Dead. It was directed by Dan Attias and written by Scott M. Gimple, and originally aired on AMC in the United States on November 18, 2012.

This episode marks the final appearance for Emma Bell (Amy), Andrew Rothenberg (Jim) and Jeryl Prescott Sales (Jacqui).

== Plot ==
=== Woodbury ===
Andrea volunteers for sentry duty, and is trained to use a bow and arrow by one of the town guards, Haley. When a walker approaches and their arrows fail to fell it, Andrea jumps over the wall and kills the walker with a knife. She is chastised by Haley for breaking the rules and called to The Governor. Andrea says that seeing the fight between Merle and Martinez the night before had invigorated her. Andrea spends the night with The Governor and they have sex.

Meanwhile, Merle and three others from Woodbury have been tasked by The Governor to locate Michonne, who had left the town. She ambushes them, killing two of Merle's men. Merle shoots Michonne in the leg, she then runs off. Merle is left with the inexperienced Gargulio to track her. Merle continues the pursuit, and the two of them eventually engage in a fight. The fight draws walkers that pin them down.

Michonne escapes by slicing one open, spilling its entrails on her and allowing her to flee unnoticed, while Gargulio helps Merle to break free. Recognizing Michonne is heading for the dangerous Red Zone, Merle calls off the hunt and returns to Woodbury, with the intent to say that he killed Michonne. Gargulio refuses to lie to The Governor, and Merle decides to kill him.

Merle and Michonne both separately converge on a shopping mall where Glenn and Maggie are gathering supplies for the newborn. Michonne stays hidden as Merle approaches, the two having recognized Glenn as part of Rick's group that had left him to die in Atlanta. He forces the two to drive him back to Woodbury. Michonne, overhearing the conversation, gathers the supplies Glenn and Maggie obtained and makes her way to the prison. In Woodbury, as Glenn and Maggie are locked into separate rooms for later interrogation, Merle explains how he had killed Michonne.

=== Prison ===
Rick, still trying to cope with the death of his wife Lori, after childbirth, is alone in the prison boiler room where she had died when the phone rings. He answers it to hear the voice of Amy telling him she is in a safe place and will call back later. A second call from Jim asks him to explain his justification for killing other people and berates him for refusing to talk about Lori's death before dropping the call. A third call from Jacqui draws Rick to try to explain his refusal to talk about Lori's death. Finally, the last call is from Lori; it dawns on him that these calls have come from those who have died, and all have been imagined as part of his grief. He leaves the boiler room, cleans himself up, and joins the group, seeing his daughter for the first time since he saw Maggie carry her into the yard after she was born.

Rick spots Michonne waiting patiently outside with supplies for the newborn, covered in masking her presence from the walkers who surround the prison. Inside, Daryl, Oscar and Carl are clearing out walkers when Daryl spots one with Carol's knife in it. They had thought Carol had died in the previous walker infestation. Seeing a secured door nearby, Daryl psyches gets the nerve to confront Carol as a walker, but opens it to discover Carol inside, exhausted but alive. He carries her back to the cells.

== Reception ==
=== Critical response ===
Zack Handlen, writing for The A.V. Club, rated the episode an "A−" on a scale of A+ to F. Of the multiple storylines weaved in the episode, he felt that Rick's was the strongest and Andrea's the weakest, but also noted that Andrea has become "more interesting", with her confession about enjoying the fights from the previous episode.

=== Ratings ===
On its initial broadcast on November 18, 2012, "Hounded" was watched by an estimated 9.21 million viewers, decreasing in roughly a million viewers from the previous episode.
