= The Suicide King (The Walking Dead) =

- The Walking Dead episode
- The group leave Woodbury with the rescued Daryl and Merle.
- Episode no.: Season 3 Episode 9
- Directed by: Lesli Linka Glatter
- Written by: Evan Reilly
- Cinematography by: Rohn Schmidt
- Editing by: Julius Ramsay
- Original air date: February 10, 2013

Guest appearances
- Emily Kinney as Beth Greene; Lew Temple as Axel; Dallas Roberts as Milton Mamet; Chad L. Coleman as Tyreese Williams; Sonequa Martin-Green as Sasha Williams; Jose Pablo Cantillo as Caesar Martinez; Alexa Nikolas as Haley; Melissa Ponzio as Karen; Tyler Chase as Ben; Travis Love as Shumpert; Daniel Thomas May as Allen; E. Roger Mitchell as Paul

Episode chronology
← Previous "Made to Suffer"	Next → "Home"
- The Walking Dead season 3

"The Suicide King" is the ninth episode and mid-season premiere of the third season of the post-apocalyptic horror television series The Walking Dead. It was directed by Lesli Linka Glatter and written by Evan Reilly, and aired on AMC in the United States on February 10, 2013. The episode's first airing was the most-watched episode of the series and beat several ratings records for a basic cable series.

== Plot ==
Brothers Daryl and Merle are forced to fight to the death for the entertainment of the residents of Woodbury, despite Andrea's protests to The Governor. As they wrestle, Merle discreetly tells Daryl to follow his lead as walkers are herded into the arena. Suddenly, Rick and Maggie appear, throw a smoke bomb into the arena and help Daryl and Merle to escape through a breach in Woodbury's fence. On rejoining Glenn and Michonne nearby, Merle's past interactions antagonize the group, particularly when he reveals that he had brought Michonne and Andrea there. Rick forbids Merle from returning with them to the prison, and Daryl refuses to leave Merle’s side, and the brothers set off on their own. As the others return to the prison, Rick tells Michonne that she will also have to leave once her injuries are treated. Glenn accosts Rick for the failure of their mission, not only failing to bring back Daryl but forgoing the opportunity to assassinate The Governor.

In Woodbury, the recent events have caused a number of residents to demand they be allowed to leave Woodbury, but The Governor refuses to listen, bitter over Rick's attacks. When a few walkers manage to enter Woodbury by the breach Rick's group used, The Governor only exits his home to finish the walkers and euthanize a resident, then retreats back to his home. Andrea tries to coax The Governor to drop the matter, but learns from him he was aware of her friends at the prison and did not tell her, not believing that she supports Woodbury. Later, Milton and Andrea speak inspirational words to the Woodbury residents about rebuilding and persevering, winning over the crowd and defusing the internal strife.

Meanwhile, at the prison, Hershel, Beth, and Axel visit Tyreese, Sasha, Allen, and Ben, the last survivors of a larger group that recently found their way into the prison. Carl has kept them locked in a different cell block, unsure of their loyalty and waiting for Rick to return to make a decision about whether they can stay. Ben and Allen discuss a plan to overpower their captors, but Tyreese and Sasha refuse to allow this to happen, still hoping for the best.

Rick's group returns, and Carol is dismayed to see Daryl is not with them, but understands why he would stay with Merle. Hershel tends to the wounded, while Rick goes to talk to Tyreese's group. Tyreese and Sasha plead with Rick to allow them to stay, but Rick is unwilling to give them a chance. Hershel speaks to Rick and has appeared to convince him to allow the newcomers to stay, when suddenly Rick has a vision of his dead wife Lori, and madly yells out "Get out" and "I can't help you!" Everyone is frightened by this outburst, and Glenn quickly escorts Tyreese's group out of the prison before the situation escalates further.

== Reception ==
=== Critical response ===
The episode received mixed reviews from critics. Zack Handlen, writing for The A.V. Club, rated the episode a B on an A to F scale, commenting the episode "feels like it’s shuffling folks around so it can get to the next big step in the season’s arc, and while I wish it did so with a little more grace or character, those make-or-break stakes remain". Eric Goldman at IGN gave the episode 7.7 out of 10, saying he enjoyed Glenn and Carol's character growth, but disliked how Andrea and the residents of Woodbury acted in the episode.

Critics of The Atlantic wrote, "What a hot steaming mess of mind-numbing numbitude this episode was! No, check that, it wasn't boring -- it was offensive."

Darren Franich of Entertainment Weekly wrote, "The show still runs into problems when the characters talk too much...every...new character is basically a walking Meatbag waiting to be chomped or sliced...Walking Dead reminds you of Battlestar Galactica, and it doesn't benefit from the comparison: While the characters on BSG decided to keep moving forward, the characters on Walking Dead appear stuck in their tracks, reliving the same traumas over and over. Will Andrea fall for next season's villain, too?...Lori was not a good character. The show killed her off: That was wise. The show has now brought her back in ghost form twice: That is not wise."

=== Ratings ===
Upon its initial broadcast on February 10, 2013, "The Suicide King" was watched by 12.3 million viewers, becoming the most-watched episode of the series at the time, and it beat several ratings records for a basic cable series.
