= Merle Dixon =

Fictional character

- The Walking Dead character
- Merle Dixon, as portrayed by Michael Rooker in the television series
- First appearance: "Guts" (2010)
- Last appearance: "This Sorrowful Life" (2013)
- Created by: Frank Darabont
- Portrayed by: Michael Rooker
- Voiced by: Michael Rooker (Survival Instinct)

In-universe information
- Occupation: Drug Dealer; Military Serviceman; Leader of the Savage Sons Motorcycle Club; Supply Runner for the Atlanta Camp; Guard for Woodbury
- Family: Will Dixon (father); Daryl Dixon (brother); Jess Collins (half-uncle); William T. Dixon (grandfather)

Merle Dixon is a fictional character from the horror drama television series The Walking Dead, which aired on AMC in the United States. He was created by series developer Frank Darabont and was portrayed by Michael Rooker. The character was first introduced in the first season as a Southern redneck hunter who has a younger brother, Daryl. He is misogynistic and racist, which causes tensions between him and his group of survivors. Following an encounter with series protagonist Rick Grimes, Merle disappears and joins the community of Woodbury, Georgia, where he becomes the right-hand man of The Governor. He becomes caught in the conflict between the Governor and Rick, especially when nobody in Rick's group wants him in the group, except for Daryl.

The character's introduction garnered negative reviews from professional critics, but fan response was positive. When the character reappears in the third season, reviewers began to have more favorable views towards him. Merle is an original character in the television series and shares no counterpart in the comic books. Rooker made guest appearances as Merle in the series' first and second seasons, before he was upgraded to a series regular for the third season, where he lost a significant amount of weight in preparation for the role. Rooker was among the cast members who were awarded the Satellite Award for Best Cast – Television Series in 2012.

== Appearances ==
Merle is the older brother of Daryl Dixon. Having no mother and a neglectful and abusive father, Merle raised Daryl when not incarcerated in juvenile detention. Though the length of time and military occupational specialty are not stated, Merle served in the United States Army, where at some point he mouthed off to a non-commissioned officer and subsequently punched five of his teeth out. According to Shane and Daryl, Merle was a drug dealer before the outbreak. He is also shown to have been a drug user (e.g., in "Guts" and "This Sorrowful Life").

=== Season 1 ===
Merle first appears in the episode "Guts", along with a group of survivors who had traveled into Atlanta to scavenge for supplies. While atop a department store roof, Merle begins firing a rifle at walkers on the street while the group demands that he stop. Merle insults T-Dog (IronE Singleton) with a racist slur, and subsequently beats T-Dog in a brief, intense fight. After momentarily announcing himself leader of the group, Merle is blind-sided by Rick Grimes (Andrew Lincoln), who punches him and handcuffs him to a pipe before Merle can fight back. Merle is put under T-Dog's watch while the other survivors attempt to find a way out of the city. When the survivors do find a way out, T-Dog attempts to save Merle, but accidentally drops the handcuff keys into a vent; this forces him to abandon Merle on the roof. Before T-Dog flees, he chains the rooftop door shut to prevent walkers from getting Merle.

In the next episode "Tell It to the Frogs", as walkers begin to invade the building and reach the chained rooftop door, Merle struggles until he notices a hacksaw by the spilled toolbox the others had left behind. He uses his belt to reach the hacksaw and ultimately cuts off his own hand to escape, as the hacksaw blade was too dull to cut through the handcuffs. Rick and the group return to the camp and explain to Daryl that they abandoned Merle. Daryl, T-Dog, Rick and Glenn (Steven Yeun) decide to return to Atlanta to retrieve him as well as a bag of weapons Rick dropped downtown. Returning to the department store roof, the four see that Merle has severed his own hand with a dull hacksaw. In the next episode "Vatos", the four find evidence that Merle survived the self-mutilation by cauterizing the wound. They follow Merle's blood-trail through the department store but are unable to find him. Back outside, they discover their truck has been taken. Rick feels that the truck might have been stolen by Merle during his escape.

=== Season 2 ===
Merle remains missing throughout the second season. He only appears in the episode "Chupacabra", wherein Merle taunts and mocks Daryl in a hallucination for giving up on searching for him and reminds Daryl that he is in a group that had left Merle for dead on the rooftop. Merle also berates Daryl for a perceived weakness that Merle blames on the time Daryl has spent with the group.

=== Season 3 ===
In the episode "Walk with Me", Merle is found to be living in Woodbury, where he has earned the status of the Governor's right-hand man. He has fashioned a knife attachment onto the stump where his hand used to be. He has been hoping to find his brother, Daryl, since his own separation from the group. While investigating an incident involving a crashed helicopter, Merle and a group of survivors from Woodbury encounter Michonne and fellow Atlanta survivor Andrea, and bring them back to Woodbury, along with the sole survivor of the helicopter crash. In the episode "Killer Within", Andrea gives Merle directions to the last location where she had seen Daryl.

Merle is noticeably kept in line by the Governor, a sharp contrast to his nature in the Atlanta group. In the episode "Hounded", Merle allows Michonne to leave Woodbury at the Governor's orders, but in the next episode, "Say the Word", the Governor sends Merle to lead a posse to hunt down Michonne. He wounds her and she kills members of the posse, but when Michonne escapes into the red zone, Merle calls off the hunt, reporting to the Governor that he killed her. Later on, Merle runs into Glenn and Maggie from the Atlanta group. He asks them to take him to Daryl. They refuse, so he holds Maggie hostage and demands Glenn drive them to Woodbury. In the episode "When the Dead Come Knocking", Merle unsuccessfully tortures Glenn to obtain the location of the group, including beating Glenn and leaving him locked in a room with a walker and tied to a chair. In the episode "Made to Suffer", Rick's group infiltrates Woodbury and rescues Glenn and Maggie, Michonne attacks the Governor; furious at losing an eye and his reanimated daughter to a woman Merle reported as dead, he publicly accuses Merle of treason and reveals that he has captured Daryl. In the episode "The Suicide King", the Governor orders Merle and Daryl to fight to the death, but they are saved by Rick and Maggie, who attack Woodbury. When Merle begins to insult the group, Rick knocks him out. Rick's group decides not to include Merle because of his attitude and his transgressions against Maggie and Glenn, but Daryl opts to leave the group to join Merle, refusing to leave his brother behind again.

Merle and Daryl spend time fending for themselves in the woods. In the episode "Home", they come across a family being attacked by walkers and Merle half-heartedly assists in Daryl's efforts to rescue them. Merle then attempts to rob them, but Daryl points his crossbow at him and lets the family drive off before walking off on his own. Merle follows and they get into a physical confrontation, where the depth of their father's abuse is shown when Merle inadvertently exposes scars on Daryl's back. Merle realizes that his leaving home resulted in Daryl becoming the target of their father's abuse. It is also revealed that the brothers had originally planned to rob the Atlanta group. Daryl then leaves to go back to the prison, despite Merle's claims that the group will never accept him. The brothers arrive at the prison at the tail-end of an assault by the Governor and his men, who have crashed a truck through the prison gate and unleashed a horde of walkers onto the prison grounds. Merle and Daryl save Rick from attacking walkers.

In the episode "I Ain't a Judas", Merle is promptly locked inside a prison cell, where he shares what he knows about Woodbury and the Governor with the group. He bonds with Hershel and apologizes to Michonne, claiming his attack on her was simply following the Governor's orders. Later, Merle, hearing Beth's singing, walks into the cell block where he and Rick share an antagonizing look from across the room. In the episode "Arrow on the Doorpost", Merle unsuccessfully tries to get the prison group to attack the Governor after fighting Glenn. He later tries to get Michonne to join him with his mission.

In the penultimate season three episode "This Sorrowful Life", Rick confides in Merle, Daryl, and Hershel that the Governor promises to leave the prison alone if they hand over Michonne. Rick plans to do as the Governor requests and asks Merle to help deliver Michonne to the meeting place at noon. Merle, knowing that Rick will not go through with it, traps and ties up Michonne. However, after he and Michonne talk about personal matters, he lets her go and returns her katana, telling her he has something to do alone. He starts drinking whiskey before using loud music to lure a group of walkers to the exchange site where the Governor is waiting to ambush whoever will show up. The music also distracts the Governor's henchmen while Merle secretly takes cover, intent on killing the Governor both for revenge and to prevent him from killing anyone else at the prison, mainly Daryl. After shooting several of the henchmen, Merle is caught and beaten by Martinez and two other men and then, injured and winded, fights one-on-one with the Governor. The Governor gets the upper hand and bites off two of Merle's fingers. A wounded Merle then yells that he will not beg for mercy before the Governor shoots him in the chest with a pistol. Later on, Daryl, who left the prison to track down Merle and Michonne after Rick noticed them missing, finds Michonne unhurt and continues on to the exchange site, where he sees a reanimated Merle eating Ben's corpse. Daryl breaks down in tears and pushes his reanimated brother away more than once before stabbing him repeatedly in the head, killing him for good.

=== The Walking Dead: Daryl Dixon ===
In season 3, a young Merle appears several times in Daryl's dreams, urging him to run away from their abusive father.

== Development and reception ==
Actor Michael Rooker described his thoughts on the role: "Merle is a survivor of the Zombie Apocalypse. And you can tell when you first meet him that even before all the shit went down he was kind of an asshole. We don't play a lot of it up in our portrayal but he's the kind of person where you're not really sure if he should be in charge... if he would be a good leader or not, though he certainly thinks he is." Merle was one of several characters introduced in the second episode of the series, "Guts". Kirkman was pleased with Rooker's performance, retorting that it was "'The Michael Rooker Show' for one solid episode."

I actually got a chance to hang out with him and he's a totally awesome guy. He always plays bad guys and psychos and it's weird, because he's this really boisterous, friendly guy. But yeah, his character is very important to the life of the show. He's a completely original character that was never in the comic. He's kind of the first human that they come across where it's like, 'Hey, this guy's really dangerous.' Also Michael Rooker likes to ad-lib. He got us over our cursing limit a couple of times. I think it was a bit of a pain in the a—for the post production people.

Eric Goldman of IGN disliked the introduction of Merle, calling him "ridiculous". Leonard Pierce of The A.V. Club commented that "Merle is a huge sore thumb in the middle of the episode: behaving like no one in his situation ever would, his character seems to exist for no other reason than to cause dramatically convenient trouble." In his review of the next episode, "Tell It to the Frogs", Pierce notes that even though "Merle is a racist asshole who might have gotten everyone killed, in a world where the only real distinction is between the living and the dead, leaving him to be torn apart leaves a bit of a bad taste in everyone's mouth."

Rooker confirmed his appearance in the second-season episode "Chupacabra" at the 2011 Aliens to Zombies Convention at the Hollywood Roosevelt Hotel in Hollywood, California. "Nobody expected this level of Merle worship," he articulated. "He's such an out-there, crazy, anything goes kind of guy. There's an uncertainty about Merle—like he'll come back when you least expect it. He's the boogeyman, and viewers love that suspense. The number one question I'm asked is, 'When is your character coming back?' I can't say when, but I promise it'll be a wild ride." Writer Robert Kirkman insisted that working with Rooker was "an absolute delight" during production, and hoped that he would regularly appear on The Walking Dead.

Rooker initially estimated that he lost 20 pounds preparing for his return in the third season, and later tallied he had lost 28 pounds. Zack Handlen, writing for The A.V. Club, commented that "Merle was a terrible character, all dumb hick stereotypes and bluster" but that in his return in the season's third episode "Walk with Me", "while still unquestionably a son of a bitch, is easier to take, less overtly awful, and more imposing". HitFix writer Alan Sepinwall commented that the scenes involving Woodbury in the next episode "Killer Within" "continue to demonstrate the pull a man like the Governor would have over Merle", but Zack Handlen's review of the episode for The A.V. Club noted that Merle's interactions with the Governor introduce some tension between them. In his review of the episode "Hounded", Handlen notes that Merle's motivations "seem to shift a bit to justify whatever the story needs him to do. But that's probably intentional; for all the Governor's calm planning, Merle is a hothead, an asshole who thinks he's a leader, and so he's going to keep making impulse decisions until one of those decisions gets him killed." Erik Kain, for Forbes magazine, described the Governor betraying Merle in the mid-season finale "Made to Suffer" as a surprise he did not expect, while Zack Handlen's review of the episode called the betrayal "almost too perfectly designed [...] It's not completely unbelievable; it's just not as believable, or intense, as it should have been." In his review of the third season's mid-season premiere episode "The Suicide King", Darren Franich of Entertainment Weekly wrote, "I think The Walking Dead has sort of bungled the reintroduction of Merle Dixon. It was always a stretch that Merle would just happen to find the Grimes Gang again, considering the sheer lonely expanse in the new zombie-infested world." Zack Handlen called the episode's opening "a decent sequence" which put the cliffhanger's high stakes aside, partly because Merle and Daryl made it out alive.

Eric Goldman at IGN specifically praised the performance of Michael Rooker in "This Sorrowful Life", the final appearance of Merle. Zack Handlen called the episode's last scene "a good one, and it leads to the terrific final confrontation between Daryl and zombie Merle that makes up for a lot". Handlen commented: "I'm not sure I buy or even understand Merle's change of heart, given how inconsistent the character has been. In his conversations with Michonne, we're being sold the idea that he's deeply conflicted about all the murdering he's done, and that he's had something like a change of heart since joining the prison group. Which doesn't really fit into anything, although at least now Merle's gradual integration with the main ensemble makes a little more sense; he wasn't supposed to be a monster, just a messed up asshole who eventually had enough regrets to try and do the right thing. There's no background for this, and no real depth to Merle apart from Michael Rooker's performance (and Rooker is almost single-handedly responsible for any consistency the character ever had)." He also felt that with Merle letting Michonne go, "it's nice to have a character actually behave better than you were expecting them to for once. And everything else with Merle from then on is great, from the scene with him drinking whiskey and using rock music to attract a herd of walkers, to his ambush of the Woodbury group that was waiting to ambush Rick, to the fight with the Governor. And, of course, the last bit, with Daryl finally finding his brother after it's too late to save him. While the show so often struggles with finding emotion or resonance in its conversations [...] there are still wordless exchanges like this, with Daryl sobbing as he stabs Merle again and again and again. There's no real complexity to what's happening, and no mystery, but it's powerful regardless, inspiring fear and pity for both characters, and ending the hour on a high note."

== In other media ==
Merle is a main character in the 2013 video game The Walking Dead: Survival Instinct, which focuses on him and Daryl during the early days of the zombie apocalypse. He also appears in the 2023 video game The Walking Dead: Destinies.

== Bibliography ==
- Keetley, Dawn (2014). "Introduction". In Keetley, Dawn (ed.). "We're All Infected": Essays on AMC's The Walking Dead and the Fate of the Human. McFarland. p. 9. ISBN 978-0786476282.
- Kirk, Chris (27 March 2013). "The Walking Dead, Season 3". Slate.
