= This Sorrowful Life =

- The Walking Dead episode
- Merle is put down by his brother, Daryl, following his sacrificial death by the hands of The Governor.
- Episode no.: Season 3 Episode 15
- Directed by: Greg Nicotero
- Written by: Scott M. Gimple
- Cinematography by: Rohn Schmidt
- Editing by: Nathan D. Gunn
- Original air date: March 24, 2013

Guest appearances
- Emily Kinney as Beth Greene; Jose Pablo Cantillo as Caesar Martinez; Tyler Chase as Ben; Travis Love as Shumpert; Daniel Thomas May as Allen

Episode chronology
← Previous "Prey"	Next → "Welcome to the Tombs"
- The Walking Dead season 3

"This Sorrowful Life" is the fifteenth and penultimate episode of the third season of the post-apocalyptic horror television series The Walking Dead, which first aired on AMC in the United States on March 24, 2013.

In the episode, Rick Grimes (Andrew Lincoln), unaware of The Governor (David Morrissey)'s plan to ambush the prison and kill whoever delivers Michonne (Danai Gurira), ponders whether or not he should hand over Michonne to The Governor. Meanwhile, Merle Dixon (Michael Rooker) takes matters into his own hand(s) in an attempt to protect his brother.

This episode featured the death of Merle, who is killed when trying to redeem himself. Critics praised the performance of Michael Rooker in the episode and Norman Reedus' performance at the end, upon confronting a zombified Merle.

The episode was watched by 10.69 million viewers, down slightly from the previous episode; and critics reacted positively to the episode.

== Plot ==
Rick privately tells Hershel and Daryl about The Governor's offer and his intentions to hand over Michonne, after which he will tell the rest of the group. Hershel refuses to be a part of it, while Daryl reluctantly supports Rick. Rick seeks Daryl's brother Merle to help as well, but he does not think Rick has the spine to do it. Merle later confides in Daryl that he considers Rick's decision hypocritical, since the group had become angry when he had turned Maggie and Glenn over to the Governor.

While Rick searches for wire to tie up Michonne, he has another vision of his dead wife Lori, which causes him to reconsider his decision. However, Merle has decided to take the task himself, and he subdues and binds Michonne and sets off in secret to Woodbury. When Daryl finds them missing, he follows along on foot.

Merle hot-wires a car and they start to drive toward the arranged meeting spot, with Merle pointing out to Michonne that she is an outsider to the rest of Rick's group like he is. Michonne gets Merle to confess that he had never killed anyone before joining the Governor, and tells him they should return to the prison. Merle has a change of heart, stops the car, and lets Michonne go free. He continues on to the arranged meeting point, while Michonne passes Daryl and informs him where Merle is going.

Near the meeting point, Merle uses the car's alarm and radio to slowly parade a line of walkers behind the car. He rigs the car to roll forward to the meeting site while he sneaks out. The Governor's men, including Martinez, have been waiting to ambush Rick's arrival, and are distracted by the empty car and the walkers. Merle sneaks behind them and kills many of the Woodbury soldiers including Allen's son, Ben; but is caught and brutalized by the Governor himself. Merle refuses to beg for mercy, and The Governor shoots him dead.

At the prison, Glenn receives Hershel's permission to marry Maggie, and then proposes to her, using a wedding ring taken from one of the walkers at the prison fence. Rick arrives and tells the group of the offer to turn over Michonne but that he couldn't go through with it. He admits he made the decision on his own, and shouldn't have, not wanting to be a Governor. He asks the group to decide if they want to stay at the prison or leave, and leaves to go stand watch as they make their decision. There, he watches as Michonne returns to the prison.

At the meeting spot, Daryl arrives and clears out a few remaining walkers before coming across a reanimated Merle. Daryl cries at his loss, and as the walker approaches him, Daryl slams it to the ground and stabs Merle in the face several times.

== Production ==
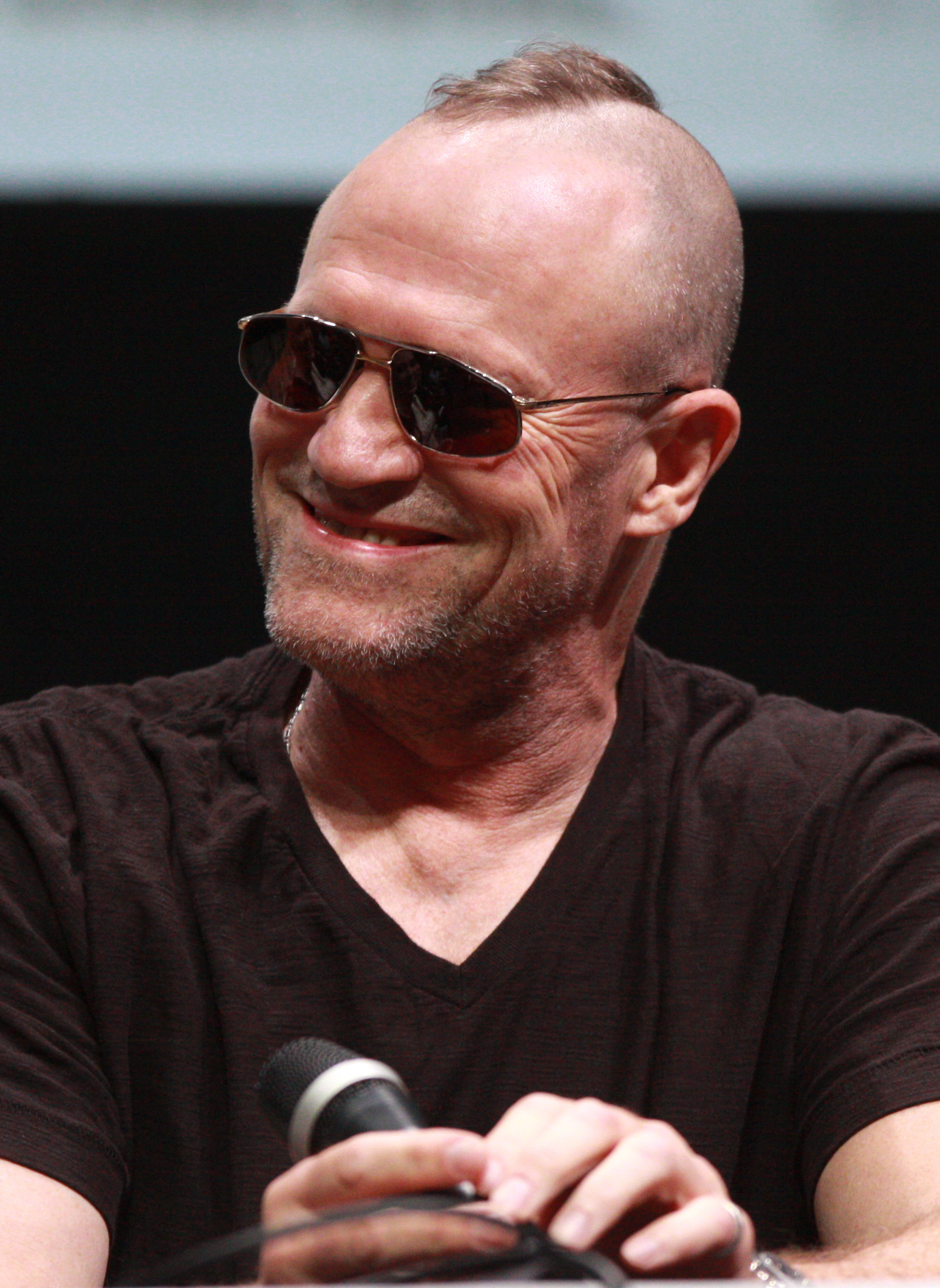
Michael Rooker (pictured in 2013) made his final appearance as a series regular in "This Sorrowful Life".

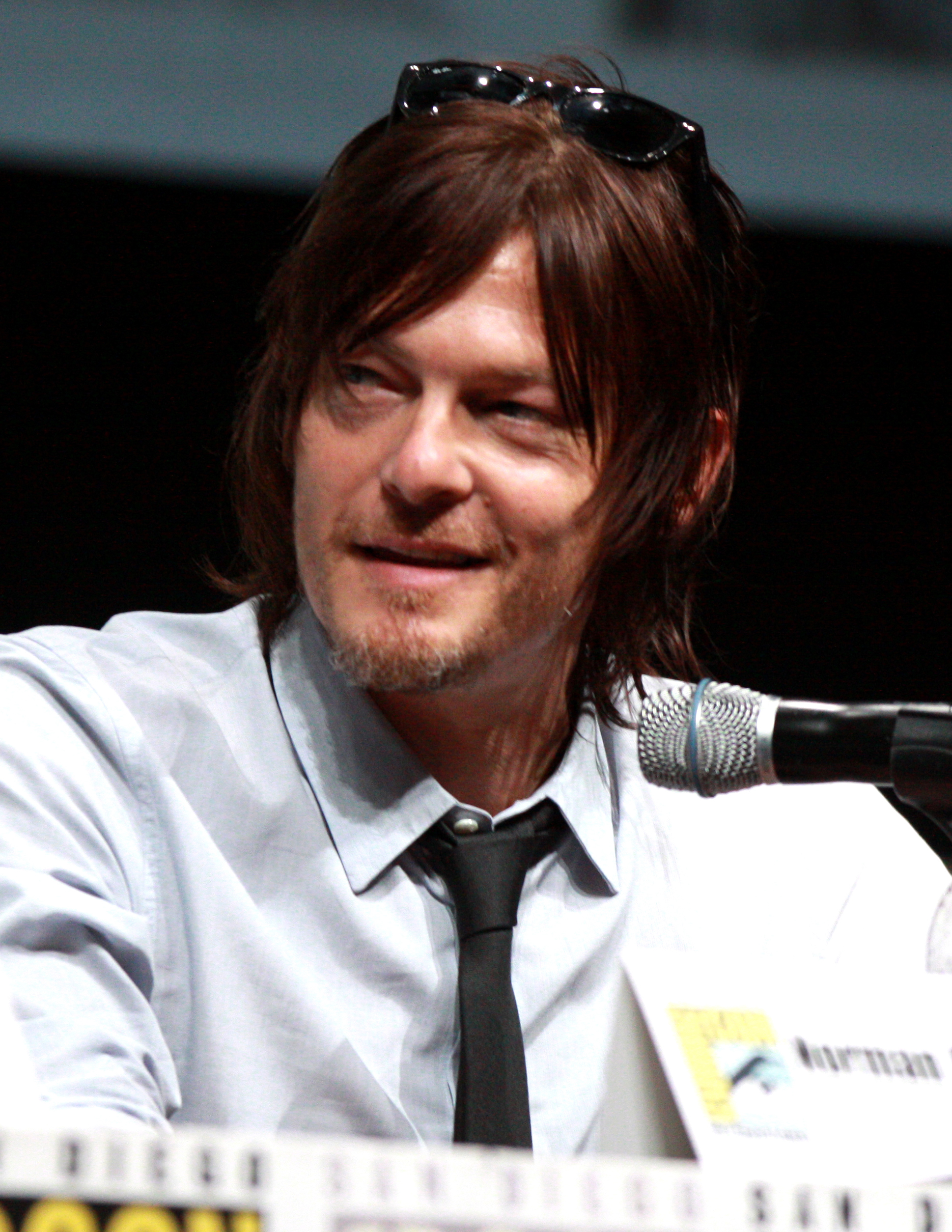
Critics applauded Norman Reedus' performance in the episode.

The episode was directed by Greg Nicotero and written by Scott M. Gimple and shares its name with the sixth volume of the comics.

This episode marks the last appearance of Michael Rooker (Merle), who was killed off in the episode, when he is shot in the chest by The Governor (David Morrissey) and was stabbed in the head multiple times by Daryl (Norman Reedus) after reanimating. On the decision to kill Merle, Robert Kirkman explained:

It's important to note that running out of story isn't a reason to kill a character. Having more story to mine isn't a reason to keep a character alive; it's what story comes out of it and how does the story change with death. Daryl Dixon has become a very important character in the show and his character had changed and evolved in very interesting ways over the course of the first three seasons. Having Merle back was always planned to be somewhat temporary thing. We wanted to see how Merle's return would affect that character and seeing Daryl revert to past behavior -- to bad behavior -- was something we really wanted to explore. But in the end, Daryl had moved past that character and we wanted to get back to him not having that brother altering his behavior moving forward or influencing him in any way. Merle's death was really about activating Daryl in an interesting way that will pay off in season four.

=== Music ===
- "Fast and Loose" - Motörhead: This song was used at the time Merle listens to music while drinking Whiskey inside his car.
- "Turn it up" - Ted Nugentː This song was used at the time Merle used to attract walkers.

== Reception ==
=== Critical response ===
The episode was critically acclaimed, with many critics and fans calling it one of Season 3's best episodes. Zack Handlen, writing for The A.V. Club, rated the episode B on an A to F scale. Eric Goldman at IGN gave the episode 9 out of 10, specifically praising the performances of actors Danai Gurira, Michael Rooker, Steven Yeun, and Norman Reedus.

=== Ratings ===
The original broadcast, on March 24, 2013, was watched by an estimated 10.99 million viewers, an increase in viewership from the previous episode.
