= Guts (The Walking Dead) =

- The Walking Dead episode
- While the rain washes away the camouflage of human blood and guts, Rick dispatches an attacking walker as Glenn Rhee watches.
- Episode no.: Season 1 Episode 2
- Directed by: Michelle MacLaren
- Written by: Frank Darabont
- Cinematography by: David Boyd
- Editing by: Julius Ramsay
- Original air date: November 7, 2010

Guest appearances
- Michael Rooker as Merle Dixon; Emma Bell as Amy; Andrew Rothenberg as Jim; Juan Pareja as Morales; IronE Singleton as Theodore "T-Dog" Douglas; Jeryl Prescott Sales as Jacqui

Episode chronology
← Previous "Days Gone Bye"	Next → "Tell It to the Frogs"
- The Walking Dead season 1

"Guts" is the second episode of the first season of the post-apocalyptic horror television series The Walking Dead. It originally aired on AMC in the United States on November 7, 2010. The episode was written by Frank Darabont, the creator of the series, and directed by Michelle MacLaren. In the episode, Rick Grimes (Andrew Lincoln) joins a small group of survivors in an attempt to escape from Atlanta.

== Plot ==
Sheriff's Deputy Rick Grimes (Andrew Lincoln) is able to escape the tank and the swarm of walkers with help from Glenn Rhee (Steven Yeun), who leads the two to safety in a department store. There Rick meets the other members of Glenn's scavenging group, including Merle Dixon (Michael Rooker), a virulent racist, and T-Dog (IronE Singleton), a black man dismayed by Merle's attitude. When Merle beats up T-Dog and asserts control over the group, Rick subdues Merle and handcuffs him to a pipe on the store's roof. Glenn makes radio contact with the survivors' camp outside the city, where, unknown to Rick, his friend Shane Walsh and his wife Lori (Sarah Wayne Callies) and son Carl (Chandler Riggs) are safe. Shane and Lori believe Rick is dead and have begun a sexual relationship.

As walkers surround the building, the group finds its escape route through a sewer cut off. Rick then spots a box truck nearby that they could use to escape, so Rick and Glenn cover themselves in the blood and viscera of a dispatched walker to mask their scent from other walkers. They exit the store and begin shambling through the horde toward the truck, but a rainstorm begins to wash away the walker scent, soon forcing Rick and Glenn to make a break for the truck. Glenn uses the car alarm on a Dodge Challenger to draw the walkers away, while Rick drives the box truck to the department store's cargo doors. In the rush to escape, T-Dog accidentally drops the handcuff key for Merle down a storm drain, and they are forced to abandon him; however, T-Dog secures the roof access door with a heavy chain to give Merle some protection. The remaining group travel with Rick back to the survivors' camp, with Glenn following close behind.

== Production ==
Filming for the episode commenced in several places throughout Atlanta, including the Sam Nunn Atlanta Federal Center.

"Guts" was written by Frank Darabont and directed by Michelle MacLaren. The episode contains a sequence in which the survivors kill and dissect a walker. Rick Grimes and Glenn Rhee agree to find a vehicle to escape from downtown Atlanta and, to avoid attracting the attention of hordes of walkers, wrap entrails around themselves. Filming for the scene commenced at the non-skyscraper part of the Sam Nunn Atlanta Federal Center, depicted as an abandoned Macy's location. (It is in fact the historic former flagship store of Atlanta-based Rich's, closed by Macy's parent company; the actual downtown Macy's was the Davison's store.) Writer Robert Kirkman felt that it "very much makes sense in the context of the story", and added that the graphic violence had its place within the show. In his interview with Entertainment Weekly, Kirkman explained why the characters covered themselves in the blood and entrails of a walker:

It's not that they can smell better, it's just that they're used to a general smell of deadness, as they're moving around in groups. And the only way that they can possibly differentiate between living people and dead people, is kind of an absence of that smell. It's really just a difference in how they smell, not 'Hey, we can seek out living flesh like a bloodhound!' It occurred to me that every now and then there are zombies that don’t really look that much more dead than an alive person. It can't really be from a visual perspective that they’re attacking human beings. And they don't attack each other, ever. So there has to be a reason for that. So maybe it's some kind of a smell thing.

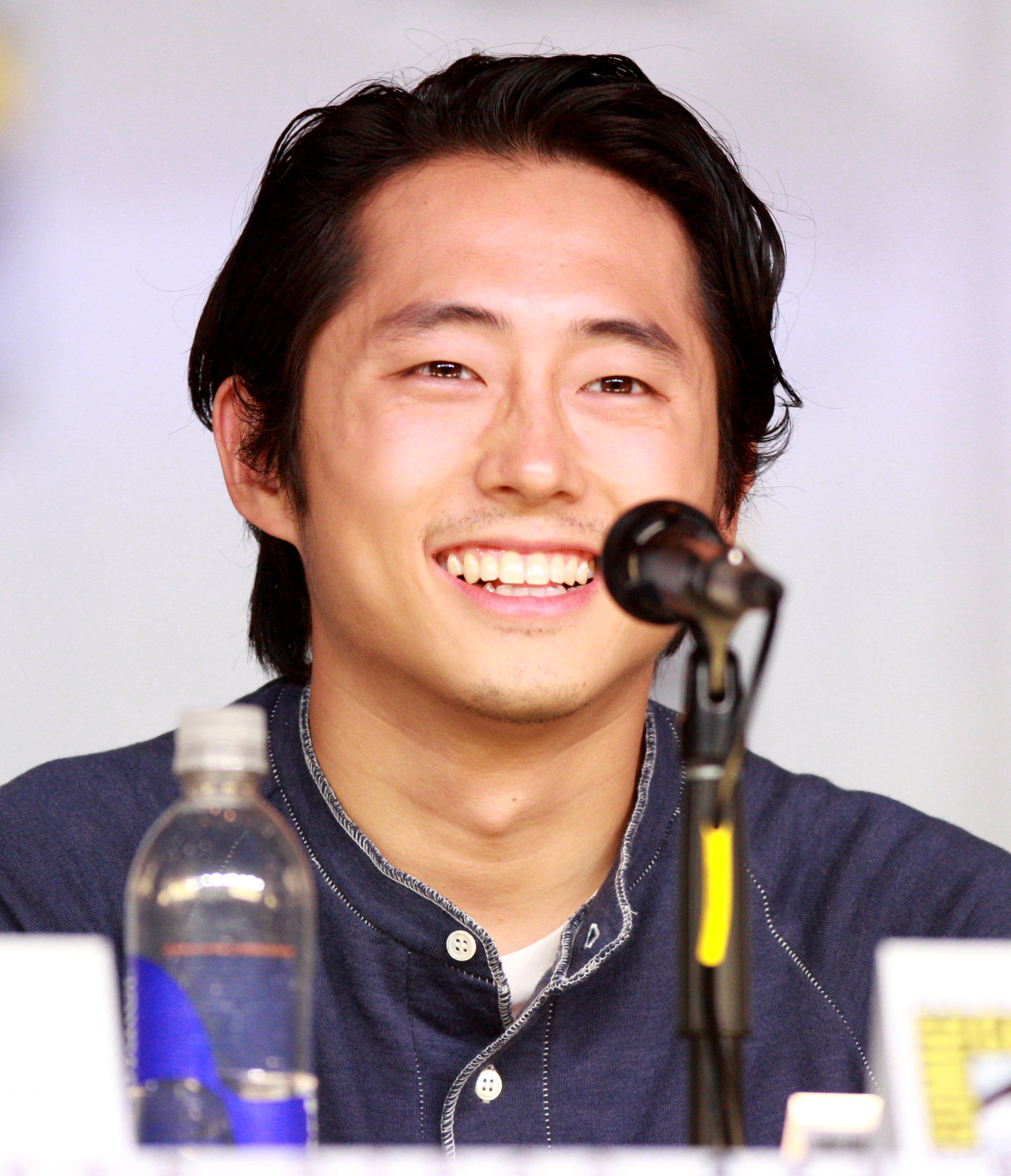
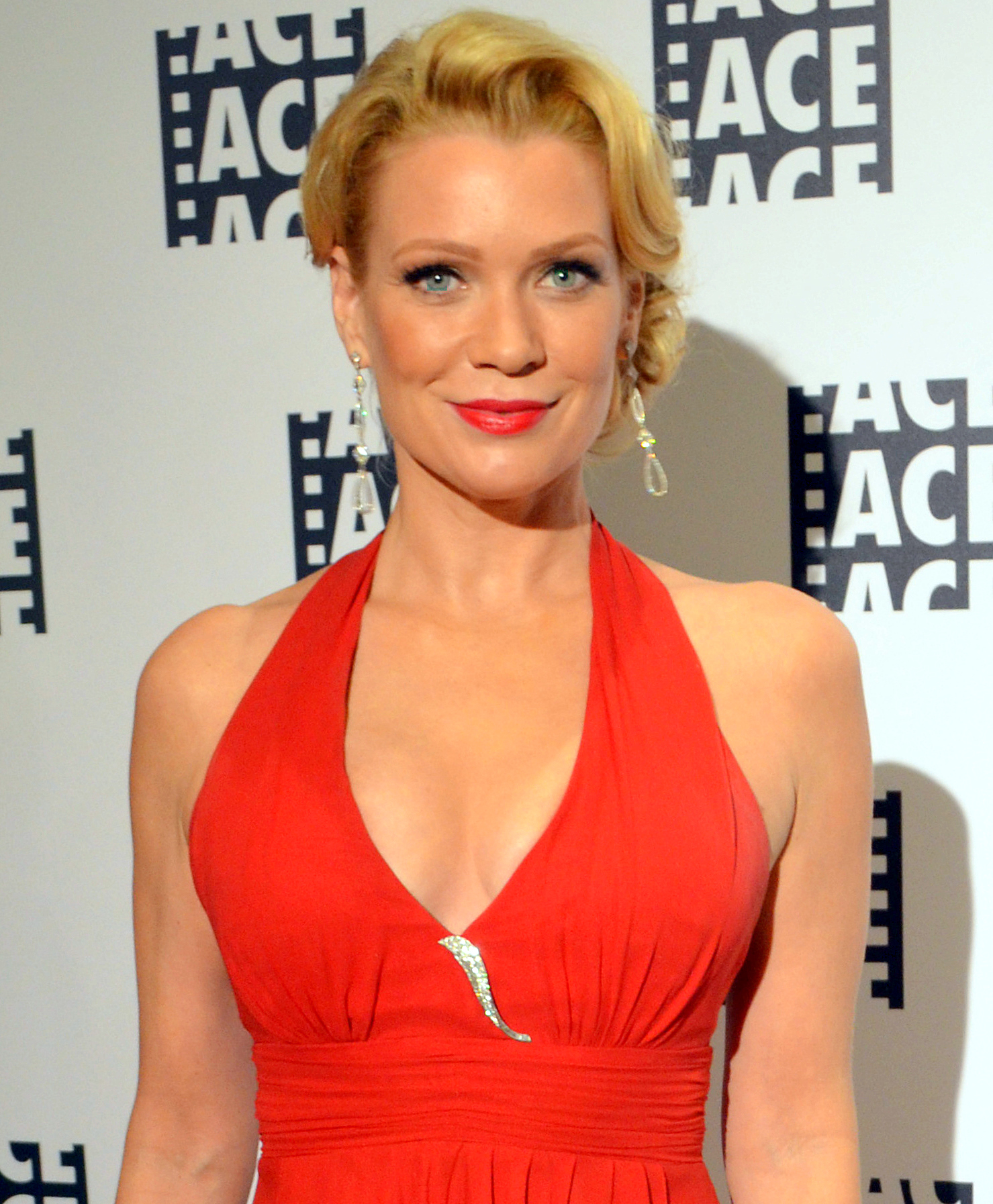
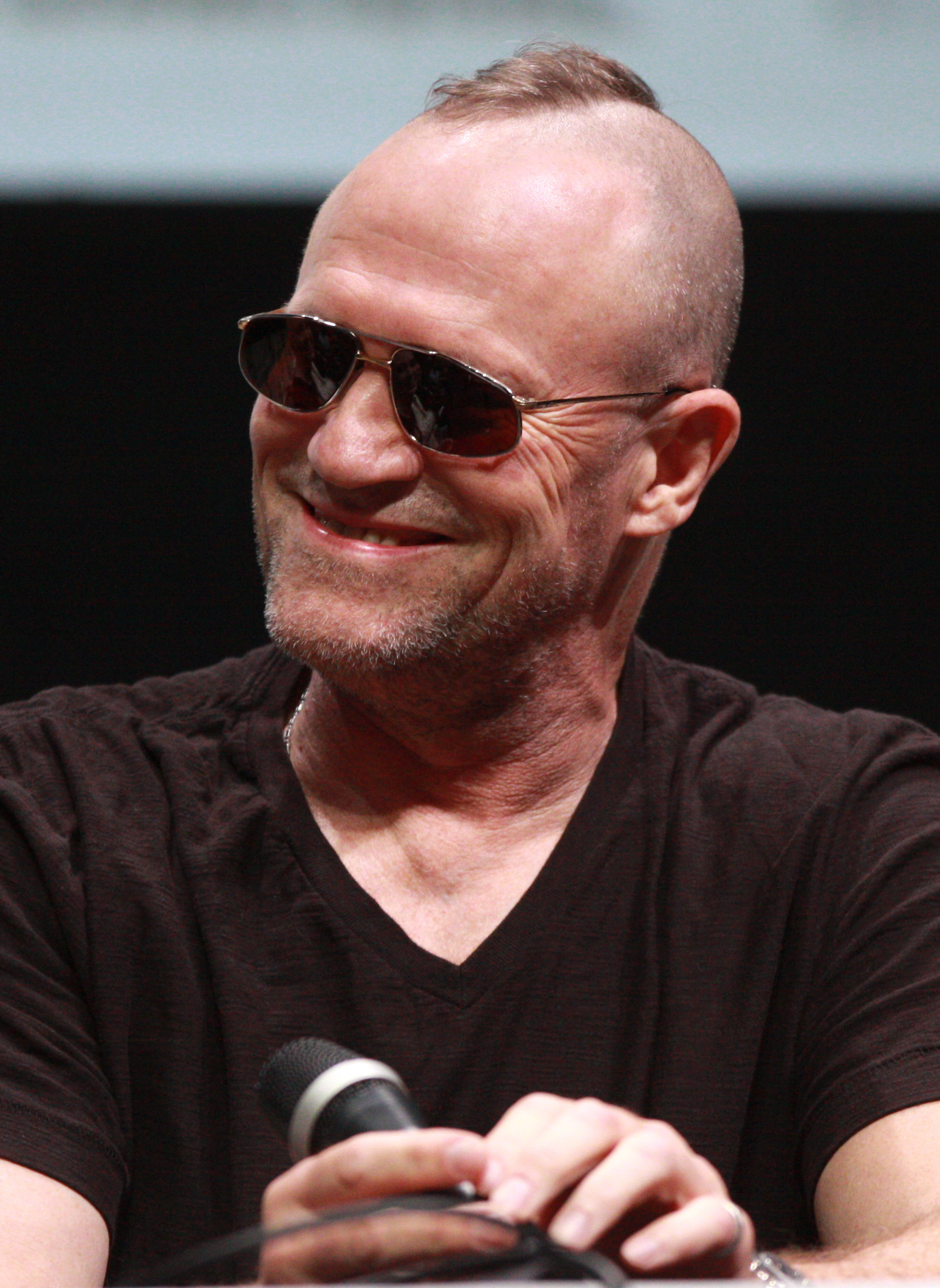
Steven Yeun (Glenn Rhee) (left), Laurie Holden (Andrea) (center), and Michael Rooker (Merle Dixon) (right) made their debut in this episode.

Alongside the main cast (IronE Singleton as T-Dog, Jeryl Prescott as Jacqui, Juan Pareja as Morales), "Guts" features guest appearances from several actors and actresses, including Emma Bell as Amy and Michael Rooker as Merle Dixon. The following month after Sarah Wayne Callies was announced to play the role of Rick's wife Lori Grimes, Laurie Holden claimed the role of Andrea; Holden had previously worked with Darabont in the science-fiction horror film The Mist (2007). Andrew Rothenberg played Jim. Sam Witwer, who had collaborated with Darabont in The Mist, appeared as a dying soldier. Frances Cobb played a camp survivor. Chance Bartels played the walker shot by Merle. Kirkman stated that he was thrilled upon hearing of the actor's appearance, and added that he had known of Rooker since the comedy film Mallrats (1995). He was pleased with Rooker's performance, quipping that it was "'The Michael Rooker Show' for one solid episode."

I actually got a chance to hang out with him and he's a totally awesome guy. He always plays bad guys and psychos and it's weird, because he's this really boisterous, friendly guy. But yeah, his character is very important to the life of the show. He's a completely original character that was never in the comic. He's kind of the first human that they come across where it's like, 'Hey, this guy's really dangerous.' Also Michael Rooker likes to ad-lib. He got us over our cursing limit a couple of times. I think it was a bit of a pain in the a—for the post production people.

The sign on the white box truck Rick and Glenn requisition to rescue their supplies from the Atlanta department store reads "Ferenc Builders". Ferenc is the given name of series developer-writer Frank Darabont.

== Reception ==
=== Critical response ===
Leonard Pierce of The A.V. Club gave it a grade of B− on a F to A scale, commenting it was a step down in quality from the pilot, but said it "had many good qualities" and "the show still looks fantastic, and the choice to use 16mm film pays off time after time, giving everything a stark, bright quality that fits the mood perfectly." Eric Goldman of IGN rated the episode 7 out of 10, and also noted how it was a weaker episode than the pilot. Goldman disliked the introduction of Merle, calling him "ridiculous", but enjoyed the sequence in which Rick and Glenn cover themselves in guts to disguise them from the zombies. He commented, "Overall, this episode had its fun moments, feeling more like an adrenalin-filled straight up horror movie than the more slow-paced pilot. But it also lacked the pilot's emotion and depth."

=== Ratings ===
Upon its initial broadcast on November 7, 2010, "Guts" was watched by 4.7 million viewers, which was slightly down from its pilot episode.
