= Tell It to the Frogs =

- The Walking Dead episode
- Rejected by Lori Grimes, Shane Walsh lashes out his frustrations on the abusive and chauvinist Ed Peletier.
- Episode no.: Season 1 Episode 3
- Directed by: Gwyneth Horder-Payton
- Story by: Charles H. Eglee; Jack LoGiudice
- Teleplay by: Charles H. Eglee; Jack LoGiudice; Frank Darabont
- Cinematography by: David Boyd
- Editing by: Hunter M. Via
- Original air date: November 14, 2010

Guest appearances
- Norman Reedus as Daryl Dixon; Michael Rooker as Merle Dixon; Emma Bell as Amy; Juan Pareja as Morales; Andrew Rothenberg as Jim; IronE Singleton as Theodore "T-Dog" Douglas; Adam Minarovich as Ed Peletier; Melissa McBride as Carol Peletier; Jeryl Prescott Sales as Jacqui; Madison Lintz as Sophia Peletier; Maddie Lomax as Eliza Morales

Episode chronology
← Previous "Guts"	Next → "Vatos"
- The Walking Dead season 1

"Tell It to the Frogs" is the third episode of the first season of the post-apocalyptic horror television series The Walking Dead. It originally aired on AMC in the United States on November 14, 2010. The episode's teleplay was written by Charles H. Eglee, Jack LoGiudice and Frank Darabont, the creator of the series, from a story by Eglee and LoGiudice. It was directed by Gwyneth Horder-Payton.

In the episode, officer Rick Grimes (Andrew Lincoln) finally reunites with his wife Lori (Sarah Wayne Callies), son Carl (Chandler Riggs) and best friend Shane Walsh (Jon Bernthal), although this reunion is short lived when he decides to return to Atlanta to rescue Merle Dixon (Michael Rooker), along with Daryl Dixon (Norman Reedus), Glenn Rhee (Steven Yeun), and T-Dog (IronE Singleton). After realizing that her husband is alive after all, Lori ends her tumultuous affair with Shane. That is when Shane takes out his frustration on the cruel and abusive chauvinist, Ed Peletier (Adam Minarovich).

== Plot ==
Merle Dixon (Michael Rooker) struggles to escape the handcuffs after his group abandoned him on the Atlanta department store's rooftop, swearing vengeance on Sheriff Deputy Rick Grimes (Andrew Lincoln) for putting him there. He starts to beg for God's forgiveness when walkers start trying to force open the rooftop door. Merle starts trying desperately to reach for some tools nearby, screaming that he will never beg God again.

Elsewhere, Glenn Rhee (Steven Yeun) leads Rick and the other members of his group back to the survivors' camp outside Atlanta. Rick is overwhelmed to find his wife Lori (Sarah Wayne Callies) and son Carl (Chandler Riggs) among the survivors, along with his friend and partner Shane Walsh (Jon Bernthal). As the group is reunited, they discover a walker nearby, which they quickly dispatch, though fear that this may be a sign of trouble as they had yet to see walkers anywhere near camp. Merle's brother Daryl Dixon (Norman Reedus) returns from hunting to learn of Merle's fate and becomes furious at Rick.

Feeling guilty for leaving Merle handcuffed as well as wanting to retrieve his bag of guns, Rick arranges a rescue group, including Daryl. While Rick is gone, Lori tells Shane that with Rick back she must end her relationship with Shane, who then becomes bitter. When Shane witnesses Ed Peletier (Adam Minarovich) striking his wife Carol (Melissa McBride) for not focusing on the laundry for the group as well as threatening Amy, Andrea and Jacqui, he takes his anger out on her husband by dragging him away from the group as he gives him a severe beating in an act of punishment for his chauvinist behavior despite the women pleading for him to stop. After beating him up, Shane threateningly warns to kill him if he ever harms his wife, his daughter Sophia, or any of the people in their group again which causes him to give a fearful and frightened "Yes" in response and after giving a few more beatings on Ed along with a kick in his ribs, Shane leaves, causing Carol to rush to her husband's aid and profusely apologizing to him while the others look in shock.

Meanwhile, Rick's group arrives back to the department store in Atlanta and make their way up to the rooftop, finding Merle apparently gone. However, they find a hacksaw sitting beside Merle's severed right hand within bloody handcuffs hanging from a pipe; Daryl goes into a fit of rage and screams as the others look on helplessly.

== Title reference ==
The title reference echoes Lori's angry statement to Shane, "You can tell that to the frogs", made when she is uninterested in what he has to say. Daryl feels the same way when Rick, T-Dog, and others explain why Daryl's brother, Merle, was left handcuffed on the roof of the Atlanta department store.

== Production ==
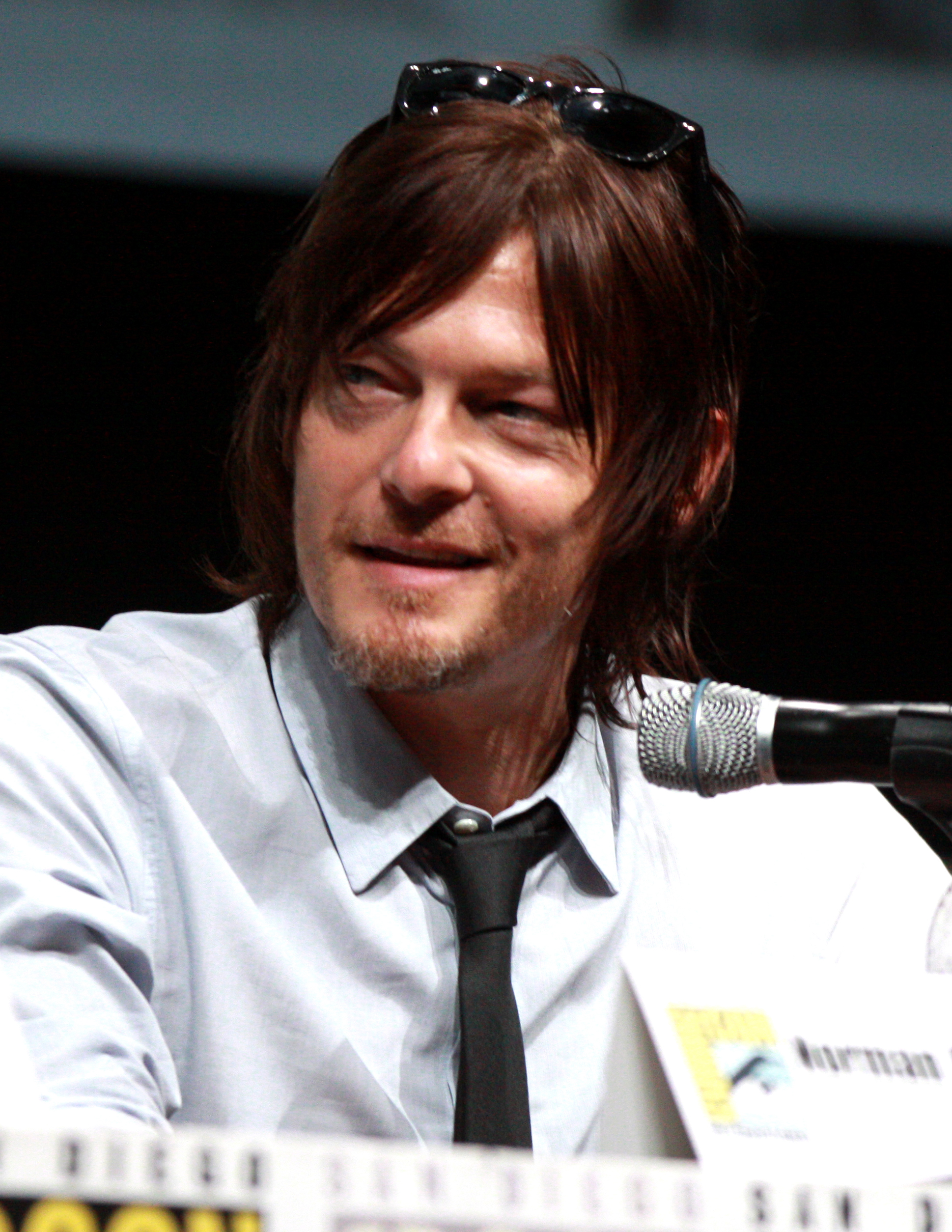
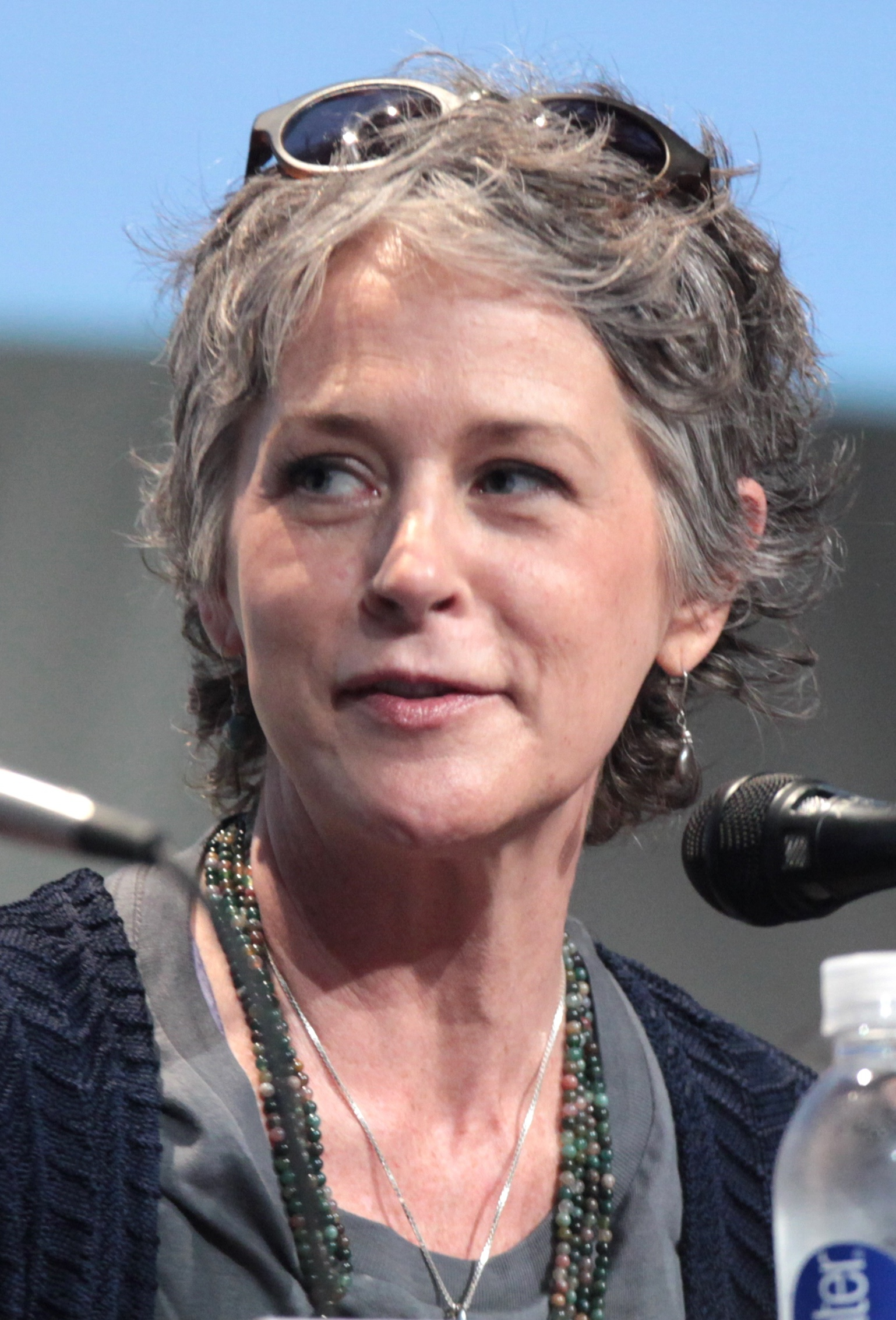
Norman Reedus (Daryl Dixon) and Melissa McBride (Carol Peletier) made their first appearances in "Tell It to the Frogs".

This episode marks the first appearance of several notable characters in the television series and from the graphic novels. This includes the abusive and misogynist husband, Ed Peletier, played by Adam Minarovich, the meek and abused housewife, Carol Peletier, played by Melissa McBride, and her daughter, Sophia, played by Madison Lintz. Sophia Peletier first appeared in the "Days Gone Bye" volume in 2003. Maddie Lomax and Noah Lomax played Eliza and Louis Morales, respectively. They are Miranda Morales' children, played by Viviana Chavez. Nilsa Castro played a CDC Lab Technician. It also marks the appearance of a prominent character exclusive to the television series, Daryl Dixon, played by Norman Reedus, an expert huntsman and tracker, who would become a long running character due to popularity.

== Reception ==
=== Critical response ===
Leonard Pierce of The A.V. Club graded "Tell It to the Frogs" A− on a scale of F to A, calling it a "key episode in setting the tone for the first season". He praised the episode, saying it "did just about everything it needed to do. It deepened characters, strengthened relationships, laid out future conflicts, and gave its cast more to do. Best of all, it returned to the slower, more thoughtful pace of the pilot." Eric Goldman of IGN also gave it a highly positive review, rating the episode 8.5 out of 10. Goldman called the episode a "big rebound from the somewhat lackluster second installment, offering a much more intense and engaging story."

=== Ratings ===
Upon its initial broadcast on November 14, 2010, "Tell It to the Frogs" was watched by 5.07 million viewers, slightly increasing in viewers from the previous episode.
