= List of The Walking Dead characters =

The Walking Dead is a franchise that includes comic books, a TV series, and a video game series. The characters or their actions may differ from one series to another. This is an index of lists of The Walking Dead characters.

- List of The Walking Dead (comics) characters
- List of The Walking Dead (TV series) characters
- List of The Walking Dead (video game series) characters
- List of Fear the Walking Dead characters
