= The Walking Dead season 3 =

Season of television series

The Walking Dead
- Season 3
- Promotional poster and home media cover art featuring Rick Grimes
- Showrunner: Glen Mazzara
- Starring: Andrew Lincoln; Sarah Wayne Callies; Laurie Holden; Norman Reedus; Steven Yeun; Lauren Cohan; Chandler Riggs; Danai Gurira; Michael Rooker; David Morrissey; Melissa McBride; Scott Wilson
- No. of episodes: 16

Release
- Original network: AMC
- Original release: October 14, 2012 – March 31, 2013

Season chronology
- ← Previous; Season 2 Next → Season 4

The third season of The Walking Dead, an American post-apocalyptic horror television series on AMC, premiered on October 14, 2012, and concluded on March 31, 2013, consisting of 16 episodes. Developed for television by Frank Darabont, the series is based on the eponymous series of comic books by Robert Kirkman, Tony Moore, and Charlie Adlard. It was executive produced by Kirkman, Glen Mazzara, David Alpert, and Gale Anne Hurd, with Mazzara as showrunner for his second and final season. The third season was very well received by critics. It was nominated for multiple awards and won two, including Best Syndicated/Cable Television Series, at the 39th Saturn Awards.

This season adapts material from issues #13–39 of the comic book series and introduces notable comic characters, including Michonne (Danai Gurira), Axel (Lew Temple), The Governor (David Morrissey) and Tyreese Williams (Chad L. Coleman). It also marks the return of Merle Dixon (Michael Rooker), the volatile older brother of Daryl Dixon (Norman Reedus), who went missing in the first season, and also features the return of Morgan Jones (Lennie James), the first survivor Rick Grimes (Andrew Lincoln) encountered and befriended, who he lost contact with in season one. As in the comics, this season is mainly set in both an abandoned prison and an active rural town of survivors.

Set eight months after the killing of Shane Walsh and onslaught of the Greene Family Farm, with the world growing increasingly more dangerous and Lori's (Sarah Wayne Callies) pregnancy advancing, the season continues the story of Rick Grimes, who has assumed a dictatorial-like leadership over his group of survivors as they survive in a post-apocalyptic world infested with flesh-eating zombies, dubbed "walkers". After discovering a potential safe haven, the group takes refuge and inhabits a large fortified prison, but this security is threatened by a nearby community — Woodbury — led by a nefarious man known as The Governor, who takes an interest in Andrea (Laurie Holden) as she remains, after the burning of the farm, separated and unaware of the main group's status.

== Production ==
AMC renewed The Walking Dead for a third season on October 25, 2011, after the season two premiere broke cable ratings records in the 18-49 demographic. On January 14, 2012, AMC announced that the third season will contain 16 episodes.

Filming for the season began in May 2012 in Coweta County, Georgia, with the city of Senoia being used as the filming location for the town of Woodbury. Ernest Dickerson directed the season premiere episode. Greg Nicotero, co-executive producer and special make-up FX artist on the series, directed the fifth episode of season 3 after already having directed the season 2 episode "Judge, Jury, Executioner". He also returned as a zombie in the episode "The Suicide King", after portraying two different zombies in the first season. In November 2012, Glen Mazzara announced that Ernest Dickerson would direct the season finale.

After the conclusion of the third season, Mazzara stepped down from his position as showrunner and executive producer for the series, in a mutual agreement by both Mazzara and AMC. The press release read, "Both parties acknowledge that there is a difference of opinion about where the show should go moving forward, and conclude that it is best to part ways."

=== Webisodes ===
Following the Torn Apart series in 2011, another set of webisodes titled Cold Storage were produced and debuted on October 1, 2012, prior to the premiere of Season 3.

=== Talking Dead ===
A second season had been commissioned in May 2012. To coincide with a marathon of the show, a special episode was aired in July 2012 following the marathon's end, featuring a tour of the various props/sets used in the third season, as well as cast/crew interviews, and a snippet of exclusive footage featuring the newly introduced character Michonne.

== Cast ==
The primary characters of the third season include (from left to right): Lori, Carl, Daryl, Carol, T-Dog, Beth, Hershel, Rick, Maggie, Glenn, The Governor, Michonne, and Andrea; absent: Merle

=== Main cast ===
The third season features ten actors receiving opening credits billing, with eight returning from the previous season and two new cast members introduced; six are listed as main cast members in the second season, while Lauren Cohan and Scott Wilson were promoted from recurring status and Michael Rooker was promoted from guest status from the previous two seasons, while Danai Gurira and David Morrissey were added to the main cast as Michonne and The Governor, respectively. However, Wilson and McBride are credited as "Also starring".

==== Starring ====
- Andrew Lincoln as Rick Grimes, the series' protagonist and a former sheriff's deputy, who has established himself as the group's leader. Rick has become a more cold and calculating leader, willing to leave strangers to die and abandon group members if it means everyone else survives, and comes into conflict with The Governor. Rick has also become distant, resentful of Lori's ambivalence and anger towards him after telling her he'd killed Shane.
- Sarah Wayne Callies as Lori Grimes, Rick's wife and Carl's mother, who is 9 months pregnant but is resented by Rick and Carl for her affair with Shane and the problems it led to. She is worried about the safety of her baby but her faith in keeping her baby alive prompts her to become a fearless mother.
- Laurie Holden as Andrea, a former successful civil rights attorney, who was separated from the group at the end of the second season. She befriends Michonne and forms a relationship with The Governor.
- Norman Reedus as Daryl Dixon, an antihero-like Southern redneck, who's also the group's primary hunter. He has become Rick's right-hand man and closest ally since Shane's death.
- Steven Yeun as Glenn Rhee, a former pizza delivery boy and Maggie's boyfriend. Glenn has found something in Maggie that he doesn't want to lose and has become very protective of her.
- Lauren Cohan as Maggie Greene, Hershel's strong-willed and determined elder daughter and Glenn's girlfriend. Maggie has come to terms with the walker virus and has since become a good fighter and an integral member of the core group.
- Chandler Riggs as Carl Grimes, Rick and Lori's young son, who has also become more cold and brutal following his father's example, but is often frustrated when he is forbidden to contribute more often, as the elder members of the group seek to retain his innocence.
- Danai Gurira as Michonne, the katana-wielding hooded figure, who saves Andrea in the season two finale. Michonne is a quiet and seemingly ruthless survivalist, who immediately dislikes The Governor. She forms a bond with Rick's son Carl and begins to shed her brutality for a healthier mindset.
- Michael Rooker as Merle Dixon, an unruly Southern redneck and Daryl's older brother, who disappeared in the first season. Merle is the right hand of The Governor, but Daryl, being his brother, could change that.
- David Morrissey as The Governor, leader of the town of Woodbury, father of Penny, and the primary antagonist of the season. The Governor is a ruthless, paranoid, and dangerous sociopath, who will murder anyone he sees as a threat to his community, and seeks to eliminate Rick's group when they move into the prison nearby.

==== Also starring ====
- Melissa McBride as Carol Peletier, a former victim of domestic abuse, who is now the last surviving member of her family, having lost her daughter Sophia last season. Carol also has a close bond with Daryl, and dislikes his brother Merle for his influence over him but sees Daryl's potential in him too.
- Scott Wilson as Hershel Greene, a religious farmer, trained veterinarian, and father of Maggie and Beth, as well as a father figure to Glenn. He serves as the group's primary moral compass and Rick's main adviser.

=== Supporting cast ===
- Emily Kinney as Beth Greene, Hershel's soft-spoken younger daughter and Maggie's half-sister, who has accepted the world's new state, having previously tried to kill herself, and has become more skilled at killing walkers. She often tries to boost morale by singing.
- IronE Singleton as Theodore "T-Dog" Douglas, a survivor of the original Atlanta group, who struggles to prove his worth to the group, but is a brave individual willing to risk his life for everyone else's sake.

==== Woodbury ====
- Jose Pablo Cantillo as Caesar Martinez, one of The Governor's men. Martinez is a loyal, slightly egotistical, member of Governor's forces, but is reasonable and has honor, and is even disturbed by The Governor's actions but is willing to do what is needed to stay alive.
- Dallas Roberts as Milton Mamet, a scientist and old friend of The Governor, who studies the walkers believing there can be a way to restore their humanity, but is reluctant to accept The Governor for the monster he is as he knew him before the outbreak.
- Travis Love as Shumpert, a silent bow using member of the Woodbury army, who is very loyal to The Governor and a good friend of Martinez.
- Melissa Ponzio as Karen, a former teacher and Woodbury citizen, who disagrees with The Governor's plan to raise an army from the Woodbury citizens, which includes the children.
- Alexa Nikolas as Haley, a cocky and overly confident female Woodbury guard.
- Donzaleigh Abernathy as Dr. Stevens, a doctor living in Woodbury.

==== The Prisoners ====
- Nick Gomez as Tomas, a violent convict and the leader of a group of prisoners, who survived within the prison.
- Lew Temple as Axel, a convict and survivor, found by the group in the prison, who tries to keep the peace but often speaks more than needed. He also forms a friendship with Carol.
- Vincent Ward as Oscar, a survivor found in the prison and Axel's best friend, who is very honorable and brave, even in the face of death, and is willing to risk his life to help those in need.
- Markice Moore as Andrew, the smallest and weakest of the prisoners which Rick's group encounters, who is also the most mischievous and cunning of them.
- Theodus Crane as Big Tiny, the largest of Tomas' group of prisoners but is also the most kind, who has trouble killing walkers.

==== Tyreese's group ====
- Chad L. Coleman as Tyreese Williams, a survivor leading a small group of people to safety, who finds the group in the prison, but is tossed out by a mentally unstable Rick against everyone else's advice. He eventually joins Woodbury, unaware of The Governor's true nature. Tyreese is a man of morals and principles willing to do what it takes the earn his place and to find a safe haven for his sister and friends, but is hesitant to hurt people even if needed.
- Sonequa Martin-Green as Sasha Williams, Tyreese's sister, who is trying to find shelter with her brother and finds the group in the prison but is tossed out by a mentally unstable Rick, against everyone else's advice, and joins Woodbury unaware of The Governor's true nature. Unlike Tyreese, Sasha has a colder survival mindset which sometimes puts her into conflict with her brother, but she is still compassionate enough to avoid unnecessary bloodshed.
- Daniel Thomas May as Allen, part of Tyreese's group, father of Ben, and husband of Donna, who is a survivalist willing to kill innocent people even if they show him compassion. He also has a feud with Tyreese as Donna became smitten with him after he saved her from walkers.
- Tyler Chase as Ben, Allen's teenage son, who is willing to do what his father tells him regardless of how dark these actions are.

==== Miscellaneous ====
- Lennie James as Morgan Jones, the first person Rick encountered and befriended after awakening from his coma who, along with his son Duane, were believed dead. Though a kind and moral father, Morgan has suffered a psychological break after his son was killed by his undead wife after Morgan failed to shoot her earlier. Morgan now believes his life's purpose is to clear Rick's hometown of all walkers and people and unintentionally almost kills Rick.
- Jon Bernthal as Shane Walsh, the second season's primary antagonist and Rick's former fellow sheriff's deputy and best friend, who had an affair with Lori and lost his sanity, due to his obsession with Lori. He was killed by Rick whilst trying to murder him in the second season, and reappears as a hallucination to Rick during the Woodbury battle.
- Emma Bell as Amy (voice), Andrea's younger sister and a former member of the group, who was bit and was put down by Andrea; heard in Rick's hallucinations over the phone.
- Jeryl Prescott Sales as Jacqui (voice), a former employee of the City of Atlanta, and former member of the group, who committed suicide after losing hope by staying in CDC with Dr. Edwin Jenner as it exploded from fail-safes; heard in Rick's hallucinations over the phone.
- Andrew Rothenberg as Jim (voice), a former member of the group, who was bit and, per his request, left to reanimate; heard in Rick's hallucinations over the phone.
- Julio Cesar Cedillo as Lt. Welles, a member of a group of military personnel, who are involved in a helicopter crash, and saved, but eventually slaughtered by The Governor while Welles himself is decapitated and has his head placed in a fish tank.

== Episodes ==
No. overall	No. in season	Title	Directed by	Written by	Original release date	U.S. viewers (millions)
20	1	"Seed"	Ernest Dickerson	Glen Mazzara	October 14, 2012	10.87
After enduring the winter on the road, the group has hardened and united firmly under Rick's leadership. He and Carl have withdrawn from Lori after her response to Shane's death. When they discover a prison, Rick and Daryl lead the group inside to clear it of walkers. Hershel is bitten on the ankle. As Rick amputates his leg to try save him, they discover five convicts surviving inside. Meanwhile, an ailing Andrea is cared for by Michonne.
21	2	"Sick"	Billy Gierhart	Nichole Beattie	October 21, 2012	9.55
Rick lays claim to the prison and tries to strike a deal with the convicts, but their leader Tomas proves too aggressive. Rick kills him and leaves his friend Andrew to be eaten by walkers. Rick spares Oscar and Axel, the remaining convicts, and lets them occupy a separate cell block. After being treated by Carol and Lori, Hershel wakes, proving that Rick's amputation saved him from the bite.
22	3	"Walk with Me"	Guy Ferland	Evan Reilly	October 28, 2012	10.51
Andrea and Michonne are drawn to a helicopter crash, where they are captured by Merle. He provides them shelter and medicine at Woodbury, a safe and well-organized town of survivors helmed by the Governor. Andrea is impressed and wants to stay while Michonne distrusts them. The Governor tracks the helicopter to a remaining group of soldiers and ambushes them, stealing their weaponry and claiming their heads as trophies.
23	4	"Killer Within"	Guy Ferland	Sang Kyu Kim	November 4, 2012	9.27
Michonne tries to convince Andrea to leave Woodbury while Merle presses her for information on Daryl. At the prison, walkers are unleashed upon the group. T-Dog is bit and sacrifices himself so that Carol can escape, but she presumably dies too. Oscar and Axel help Rick, Daryl, and Glenn search for the others. They find Andrew, who survived and sought revenge upon them, but Oscar kills him. Meanwhile, Lori goes into labor and becomes trapped within the tombs. Maggie is forced to perform a fatal C-section to save the baby. Carl shoots Lori to prevent reanimation. As the survivors regroup, Rick is devastated.
24	5	"Say the Word"	Greg Nicotero	Angela Kang	November 11, 2012	10.37
Woodbury throws a party to celebrate their success, culminating in a caged fight between Merle and Martinez. The Governor locks his daughter Penny, a walker, inside his room. Michonne rebels, forcing the Governor to exile her from Woodbury. Andrea decides to stay. At the prison, the survivors mourn their losses. Daryl and Maggie find powdered formula to feed Lori's baby. Rick grows unhinged and goes on a walker killing rampage. He hears a telephone ring and answers.
25	6	"Hounded"	Dan Attias	Scott M. Gimple	November 18, 2012	9.21
Rick entertains imaginary phone calls with other survivors, wrestling with his failure to provide a safe shelter for the group. This culminates in a cathartic discussion with Lori, prompting Rick to finally adopt responsibility for the baby. Daryl finds Carol alive in the tombs. The Governor enters a relationship with Andrea. Meanwhile, he sends Merle to assassinate Michonne, but she escapes. The two later converge with Glenn and Maggie, who are gathering baby formula. Merle captures Glenn and Maggie and returns to Woodbury, where he lies to the Governor about Michonne's fate. Michonne arrives at the prison with the baby formula.
26	7	"When the Dead Come Knocking"	Dan Sackheim	Frank Renzulli	November 25, 2012	10.43
Merle and the Governor torture Glenn and Maggie to learn the location of the prison, where Michonne informs them of Glenn and Maggie's capture. As the Governor realizes that Rick's group poses a sizeable threat, Michonne leads them to Woodbury's gate.
27	8	"Made to Suffer"	Billy Gierhart	Robert Kirkman	December 2, 2012	10.48
Tyreese, a burly survivor, leads his group into the backside of the prison and is rescued by Carl. Michonne guides Rick's party into Woodbury, where they trigger a shootout to rescue Glenn and Maggie. Unbeknownst to both sides, the conflict pits Merle and Andrea against Rick, Daryl and Michonne. Oscar is killed and Daryl is captured. Michonne ditches Rick and confronts the Governor in a violent brawl. She wounds his eye, kills Penny, and exposes his psychopathy to Andrea. As revenge for sparing Michonne, the Governor pits Merle against Daryl in a cage fight.
28	9	"The Suicide King"	Lesli Linka Glatter	Evan Reilly	February 10, 2013	12.26
Rick and Maggie rescue Daryl and Merle, but Glenn forbids Merle from returning to the prison. Unable to abandon his brother again, Daryl leaves with him. Rick promises to exile Michonne for ditching them in Woodbury. Glenn presumes that the Governor raped Maggie and blames Rick for not targeting him. Woodbury is in a panic after the shootout. While the Governor has seemingly left his post, Andrea restores order. Hershel tries to persuade Rick to let Tyreese's group join them, but Rick hallucinates a vision of Lori and becomes unhinged.
29	10	"Home"	Seith Mann	Nichole Beattie	February 17, 2013	11.05
Rick wanders the woods outside the prison while Daryl attempts to survive with Merle. With no clear leader, Glenn takes charge but wrestles angrily with his failure to protect Maggie. Hershel asks Rick to return, but he is driven mad by visions of Lori. Daryl helps a family with a newborn, which prompts an argument with his brother. Merle is shaken to learn that Daryl was similarly abused by their father yet did not become poisoned with resentment and self-interest. Daryl leaves Merle and returns to the prison. The Governor attacks the prison, killing Axel and flooding the field with walkers.
30	11	"I Ain't a Judas"	Greg Nicotero	Angela Kang	February 24, 2013	11.01
In the wake of the Governor's attack, the survivors begin to crumble. Hershel scolds Rick into resuming leadership. Merle struggles to fit in. Andrea travels to the prison to negotiate peace, but they refuse. Carol persuades Andrea to kill the Governor, but she decides against it. Tyreese leads his group to Woodbury.
31	12	"Clear"	Tricia Brock	Scott M. Gimple	March 3, 2013	11.30
Rick leads Carl and Michonne on a run to his home county to search for firearms. They encounter Morgan, who has become disturbed after seeing his undead wife kill his son Duane. Carl bonds with Michonne as she helps him retrieve a picture of Lori for baby Judith. Rick tries to persuade Morgan to return to the prison, but he declines.
32	13	"Arrow on the Doorpost"	David Boyd	Ryan C. Coleman	March 10, 2013	11.46
Andrea arranges a meeting between Rick and the Governor. Daryl and Hershel bond with Martinez and Milton. Glenn reconciles with Maggie. The Governor offers peace if Rick gives him Michonne but prepares to kill Rick's group regardless.
33	14	"Prey"	Stefan Schwartz	Glen Mazzara & Evan Reilly	March 17, 2013	10.84
The Governor prepares a torture chamber for Michonne while Martinez gathers walkers to unleash against the prison. Milton exposes these plans to Andrea. She travels to the prison to warn them, but the Governor hunts her down and captures her in the torture chamber.
34	15	"This Sorrowful Life"	Greg Nicotero	Scott M. Gimple	March 24, 2013	10.99
Rick decides to give Michonne to the Governor against Hershel and Daryl's judgement. After enlisting Merle's help, Rick changes his mind, but Merle has already taken Michonne to fulfill the deal. Rick comes clean to the group and resigns leadership, delegating the major decisions to a vote. Merle decides to release Michonne and sabotages the Governor's men. The Governor kills Merle and leaves him to reanimate. Daryl discovers him and puts him down.
35	16	"Welcome to the Tombs"	Ernest Dickerson	Glen Mazzara	March 31, 2013	12.42
The Governor kills Milton in Andrea's cell, where he turns and bites her. Woodbury's army attacks the prison but flees when Rick leads an ambush. Carl kills a surrendering soldier, terrifying Rick. Furious at their retreat, The Governor massacres his army and leaves with Martinez. Karen survives and leads Rick back to Woodbury, where Michonne consoles Andrea before her suicide. Rick welcomes the Woodbury citizens to the prison, healing his guilt from Lori's death.

== Reception ==
=== Critical response ===
The third season of The Walking Dead has received positive reviews from critics. On Metacritic, the season holds a score of 82 out of 100, indicating "universal acclaim", based on 19 critics. On Rotten Tomatoes, the season holds an 88% with an average rating of 7.85 out of 10, based on 327 reviews. The site's critical consensus reads: "The palpable terror and visceral thrills continue in the third season of The Walking Dead, along with a deeper sense of the people who inhabit its apocalyptic landscape."

The Walking Dead season 3: Critical reception by episode
Season 3 (2012–13): Percentage of positive critics' reviews tracked by the website Rotten Tomatoes

=== Accolades ===
For the 39th Saturn Awards, the third season of The Walking Dead received four nominations and two wins. The wins were for Best Syndicated/Cable Television Series and Best Supporting Actress on Television (Laurie Holden). The nominations were for Best Actor on Television (Andrew Lincoln) and Best Supporting Actor on Television (David Morrissey).

The season also received a nomination for Outstanding Prosthetic Makeup for a Series, Miniseries, Movie, or Special at the 65th Primetime Creative Arts Emmy Awards ("This Sorrowful Life"). Additionally, the season was also nominated for Outstanding Performance by a Stunt Ensemble in a Television Series at the 19th and 20th Screen Actors Guild Awards for both halves of the season, respectively. This season was also nominated for Program of the Year at the 29th TCA Awards, while Andrew Lincoln was nominated for Best Actor in a Drama Series at the 3rd Critics' Choice Television Awards.

=== Ratings ===
Viewership and ratings per episode of The Walking Dead season 3
No.	Title	Air date	Rating (18–49)	Viewers (millions)
1	"Seed"	October 14, 2012	5.8	10.87
2	"Sick"	October 21, 2012	5.1	9.55
3	"Walk with Me"	October 28, 2012	5.4	10.51
4	"Killer Within"	November 4, 2012	4.9	9.27
5	"Say the Word"	November 11, 2012	5.6	10.37
6	"Hounded"	November 18, 2012	4.9	9.21
7	"When the Dead Come Knocking"	November 25, 2012	5.4	10.43
8	"Made to Suffer"	December 2, 2012	5.4	10.48
9	"The Suicide King"	February 10, 2013	6.1	12.26
10	"Home"	February 17, 2013	5.6	11.05
11	"I Ain't a Judas"	February 24, 2013	5.7	11.01
12	"Clear"	March 3, 2013	5.7	11.30
13	"Arrow on the Doorpost"	March 10, 2013	5.7	11.46
14	"Prey"	March 17, 2013	5.5	10.84
15	"This Sorrowful Life"	March 24, 2013	5.4	10.99
16	"Welcome to the Tombs"	March 31, 2013	6.4	12.42

== Home media releases ==
Limited Edition Blu-ray packaging

The third season was released on DVD and Blu-ray in region 1 on August 27, 2013, in region 2 on September 30, 2013 and in region 4 on September 25, 2013. Special features include eight featurettes—"Rising Son", "Evil Eye", "Gone, But Not Forgotten", "Heart of a Warrior", "Michonne vs. The Governor", "Making the Dead", "Safety Behind Bars", and "Guts and Glory". Five audio commentaries, for episodes "Killer Within", "Say the Word", "Made to Suffer", "The Suicide King", and "This Sorrowful Life". Also included are 13 minutes of deleted scenes across six episodes.

The third season was also released in limited edition Blu-ray packaging, a replica of The Governor's walker head aquarium as seen in season three. The limited edition packaging was designed by Greg Nicotero and sculpted by McFarlane Toys.
