= Andrea (The Walking Dead) =

- The Walking Dead character
- Andrea, as portrayed by Laurie Holden in the television series (left) and in the comic book series (right).
- First appearance: Comics: "Issue #2" (2003); Television: "Guts" (2010)
- Last appearance: Comics: "Issue #167" (2017); Television: "Rest in Peace" (2022)
- Created by: Robert Kirkman; Tony Moore
- Adapted by: Frank Darabont (The Walking Dead)
- Portrayed by: Laurie Holden

In-universe information
- Occupation: Comics: Law firm clerk Look-out for the Alexandria Safe-Zone; Member of the Militia; Member of the Herd-Duty Crew; Television: Civil rights lawyer Supply Runner for the Atlanta Camp; Look-out for the Greene Family Farm; Guard for Woodbury
- Family: Amy (sister); Comics: Jeffrey Grimes (brother-in-law); Andrea Grimes (stepgranddaughter)
- Spouses: Comics: Rick Grimes
- Significant others: Comics: Dale; Television: The Governor
- Children: Comics: Carl Grimes (stepson); Sophia (stepdaughter-in-law); Andrea Grimes II (step-granddaughter); Ben (adopted son); Billy (adopted son)

Andrea (Note: Andrea's full name varies depending on the respective universe of the series. In the graphic novels, her maiden name is unknown, but is later referred to as Andrea Grimes and Mrs. Grimes after her marriage to Rick. In the television universe, her full name is completely unknown, but according to Holden, her full name is Andrea Harrison. And her last name in the game The Walking Dead: Survival Instinct is Harrison.) is a fictional character from the comic book series The Walking Dead and was portrayed by Laurie Holden in the American television series of the same name. The character was created by writer Robert Kirkman and artist Tony Moore, and debuted in The Walking Dead #2 in 2003. In both mediums, she and her sister Amy are among a group of survivors near Atlanta, Georgia.

In the comic book series, Andrea is a 25-year-old law firm clerk who develops from an insecure and inexperienced young woman into a mature and hardened warrior, having killed more than any other character. She forms a relationship with moral compass Dale and they raise a short-lived family with adoptive twin sons, Billy and Ben. Andrea becomes the group's primary sharpshooter and, later, a main instigator in the war against the infamous tyrant, Negan. During this event, the stress of war and grief over the loss of her family brings her closer to group leader Rick Grimes, with whom she becomes romantically involved thereafter, also becoming a surrogate mother to Carl, who begins calling her "mom."

In the television series, Andrea is eleven years older, and a former successful civil rights attorney who forms a strong, but platonic, relationship with moral center, Dale Horvath. Her grief over her sister's loss causes her to attempt suicide. Robert Kirkman assured this would initiate her transformation into the "fearless sharpshooter," mirroring her comic book counterpart, although the character's arc drastically diverts further from her comic counterpart in the third season, and her primary story arc involves the character being caught in the conflict between Rick and The Governor.

For her performance as Andrea, Holden received favorable reviews, although the character's story arc in the third season was not well received. She was nominated for several awards including the Saturn Award for Best Supporting Actress on Television in 2010 — later winning the same award in 2013.

== Appearances ==
=== Comic book series ===
A promotional image of Andrea in "A New Beginning" set two years after the war with Negan. Art by Charlie Adlard.

==== Early storylines (2003–2004) ====
As a main character of the comic book series, Andrea appears in every single volume. The character is introduced in issue two of The Walking Dead in the "Days Gone Bye" storyline on November 12, 2003 while her first prose appearance is issue five on February 1, 2004 as a survivor of the zombie apocalypse. A former file clerk, Andrea is a head-strong and independent young woman beginning to find her place in the world. During the initial stages of the outbreak, she and her younger sister Amy are getting back from a road trip and heading towards Amy's college, when they are stranded and eventually picked up by fellow survivor Dale. They set up camp together on the outskirts of Atlanta, Georgia, where they are soon joined by other survivors. The group members learn to handle guns, and Andrea discovers that she is an excellent marksman. When zombies invade the camp, Amy is bitten. A distraught Andrea shoots her sister to ensure that she does not return as a zombie. The group moves on, first to a gated community named Wiltshire Estates where Andrea and Dale engage in sex and thus begin a relationship. Following their desertion from the community, they end up at a farm, where they enjoy temporary peace. While there, Andrea makes continued failed attempts at consoling Allen and is concerned for the well-being of his children. No sooner after their arrival are they ousted from the farm by Hershel, and soon afterward while on the road she and Dale discover a path leading to a prison facility.

==== Prison arc (2004–2008) ====
In "Safety Behind Bars" (vol. #3), Andrea takes part in the clearing out of the prison. One of the surviving inmates named Thomas Richards attempts to behead her as she does laundry. She manages to escape, but her earlobe is partially severed and she receives a facial scar. In "The Heart's Desire" (vol. #4), in the aftermath of Thomas Richards' death, Andrea settles in and takes it upon herself to do others' laundry, among other household-like tasks. In addition to this, she discovers prison uniforms for the group to swap with their old clothes, and tests her sewing skills to make sure everyone has the appropriate length, ultimately becoming the group's seamstress. Dale and Andrea later become surrogate parents to twins Billy and Ben when their father Allen is bitten by a zombie and dies. The prison's existence is discovered by the Governor – the leader of Woodbury, a nearby town of survivors. In the seventh volume "The Calm Before", Andrea teaches other group members to shoot to prepare them to defend the prison, and joins an expedition led by fellow group member Tyreese to a nearby National Guard station, so as to increase their arsenal of weapons. Upon their return, Andrea discovers that Dale has been bitten on the calf by a zombie. She hurries him to the infirmary, where Rick Grimes, the groups' leader, cuts off his leg to save his life. Dale becomes jealous when Andrea begins spending increased amounts of time with group member Tyreese, until she reveals that Tyreese was helping her make a wooden leg and crutches for Dale. In "Made to Suffer", the eighth volume and conclusion to the first compendium, the Governor launches an attack on the prison. Andrea serves as a sniper and kills many of their attackers, though she is grazed by a bullet and receives a second facial scar. The Woodbury group retreats, and Dale convinces Andrea to leave the prison with him and the twins. When the prison is attacked for a second time, Andrea returns alone and again kills a number of the Woodbury group.

==== Post-prison (2008–2010) ====
In the ninth volume "Here We Remain", the prison survivors reunite back at the farm, where they meet a new group and decide to travel with them to Washington, D.C. The group of survivors who are on a mission to Washington, D.C. consist of Abraham Ford (the leader), Eugene Porter (a man who claims to have knowledge on the cure, requesting to go to D.C.) and Rosita Espinosa (Abraham's girlfriend). In "What We Become" (vol. #10), en route to DC, Dale attempts to convince Andrea to again break from the group and start a new life with Billy and Ben in an abandoned farmhouse. Andrea displays reluctance, and the suggestion becomes moot with the arrival of a herd of zombies. While on the road again, Ben murders Billy, seemingly unaware of the gravity of his actions. The group discuss killing him in which she threatens to kill anyone who even touches him, and Dale suggests that the three of them leave together, but that night, Rick's son Carl shoots Ben. Andrea is distraught, even more so when Dale disappears. In "Fear the Hunters" (vol. #11), she admits to Rick that she fears Dale never knew of her genuine love for him. Dale is later returned to the group missing his second leg, which has been eaten by cannibals. He reveals that he is dying, as he had been bitten by a zombie and left during the night to spare Andrea the pain of his death. She, Rick, Michonne and Abraham hunt down and murder the cannibals. She tells Dale how much she loves him, and is with him when he dies. As with Amy, she shoots him to stop him from turning into a zombie.

==== Alexandria (2010–2012) ====
On the outskirts of Washington, the group are recruited by a scout for the nearby Alexandria Safe-Zone, at Alexandria, Virginia named Aaron. Andrea becomes the town's look-out. Although she is pessimistic as to how long their safety will last, she attempts to discourage Rick from challenging the safe zone's hierarchy. She rebuffs the romantic advances of the zone's leader, Douglas Monroe. While she later shares a series of flirtations with Douglas Monroe's son, Spencer, that culminates in their almost kissing, she terminates their fledgling relationship when he suggests they abandon the zone while the other inhabitants are under attack by zombies, including his own father and her friends. Andrea gradually begins to develop feelings for Rick. They share a kiss, but he rebuffs her, with the explanation that everyone he cares about dies, and he does not want to lose her. She attempts to convince him that their shared experiences make them uniquely compatible, and insists on joining him in his journey to a neighboring safe zone twenty two miles away known as the Hilltop Colony to demonstrate that he need not worry about her safety. Andrea, along with Rick, Michonne, Carl, and Glenn, go to the Hilltop Colony by ambassador Paul Monroe, a community hoping to start a trading network with them. There, they are shown around and introduced to Gregory. Another resident of the colony, Ethan, returns from a failed mission where all of his companions were killed except for himself and a woman named Crystal. Ethan then tells Gregory he has a message for him and stabs him. Rick tackles Ethan to the ground and in the struggle cuts his throat, while the rest of the residents stare at him, shocked. The survivors learn of the Hilltop's trading with the dangerous Saviors and Andrea believes it to be "messed up" that they had taken advantage of it and taken most of their supplies. On the way back to Alexandria, they are stopped by a band of Saviors demanding all the supplies that Gregory gave them. The group kills all but one of the Saviors, issuing a warning to send back to their leader Negan and they make it back to the community. Andrea and Rick later find Abraham's corpse on the way back to the safe zone after she kills more Saviors to save Eugene who was left as a hostage. With Abraham gone, Rick feels Andrea is the only capable person left to defend the walls while he is gone to retrieve Paul Monroe and several others. While on patrol, a hesitant Andrea speaks to Spencer who is accepting of her relationship with Rick despite his jealousy earlier. Later, she successfully captures one of the Saviors who continue to attack named Dwight.

==== War against Negan (2012–2014) ====
Andrea is taken aback by Rick's news of Glenn's death and feels they should retaliate by killing Dwight. He refuses, but she angrily protests saying he stop blaming himself every time someone they care about dies. During a meeting the next day, Andrea interrupts Rick and tries to rally the others to support her in fighting the Saviors. Rick says that he knows what he's doing and releases Dwight to go back to Negan. Furious at Rick, Andrea decides to move out, but, when Rick tells her that he's planning to take on The Saviors in the future, she forgives him. Rick tells Andrea about the alliance formed between the Safe-Zone, Dwight, and the leader of the Kingdom (another networking community) Ezekiel. He also gives more details about his plan, which she is happy to hear. She is then taken by Rick, along with Heath, Aaron, Michonne, and Carl, to visit the Kingdom. During their stay, Andrea observes several of the residents and is impressed with their accuracy with firearms. Rick tells her that there are over thirty residents in the Kingdom who are ready for combat, plus the twenty or so men that Paul is bringing from the Hilltop. She is a little hesitant and worried that they might not have enough manpower, but, Rick assures her that Eugene's ammunition production will help even the score. During a conference between Rick, Ezekiel, and Paul, Andrea agrees with Ezekiel's plan to focus on hitting the Savior outposts and whittle away their numbers. When they arrive back to the Safe-Zone, they are greeted with troubling news that Negan has arrived ahead of schedule and that he gutted Spencer, killing him. After Rick has an argument with Negan, he tells Andrea that this may be their best chance of killing Negan and to grab her rifle and get to the bell tower. He also tells her to rally the Alexandria defenders and have them assemble at the wall. She is able to kill the Savior who was driving the truck, however she is unable to get a clear shot of Negan. After the shot, Connor finds her, beats her, and almost kills her in the bell tower. While strangling her, Connor expresses his regret on killing her, since he sees that she's been through so much. Andrea reaches for his knife and slashes his arm. She gets up and tries to kill him, until he pushes her against the ledge of the tower, with the knife against his throat. Connor challenges her to kill him before he pushes off. Right before she is about to be pushed over the ledge to her death, she flips Connor out of the tower and kills him. She then states that she and Rick are survivors. After this scuffle, Andrea passes out in the tower until Rick and Michonne help her back to the safe-zone. Back at the safe-zone, beaten and bruised, Andrea is patched up by Dr. Denise Cloyd. Andrea spends her time in recovery and bonds with Carl until Negan bombs the safe zone and they are forced to leave to the Hilltop, which Maggie Greene now rules over. Andrea assures Rick that everything he has done to unite the communities against Negan is justified. She shares a hug with her new family before Rick makes the decision to confront the attacking Saviors who are outside the Hilltop's walls. She is shocked to hear that Rick is keeping him alive to rot in a cell, as she believes he should be publicly executed.

==== Post-war (2014–2017) ====
Two years after the events of "All Out War," Andrea is shown to still be with Rick, and now has Carl calling her "mom." She is preparing to run a fair that has been in preparation for months. They live in the re-built Alexandria Safe Zone with perimeter checks around the DC area to navigate their ways across the communities. She later tells Rick she agrees with the decision to send their son to the Hilltop to become a blacksmith apprentice. She bids Carl a farewell, telling him to follow Maggie's rules. In Rick's absence to trek to the Hilltop, she is the leader of the Alexandria Safe Zone. Andrea is questioned by newcomer Magna and her group about how they survived. She explains to Magna about the events of the war that unfolded. Andrea holds a gun to Negan's head as he gets cleaned up in his prison cell, but later learns Olivia forgot to lock the cell door. She later urges the returned Rick to kill him again. The morning before the fair, Andrea wakes up early and meets with Siddiq to check on the structure for the fair, tearing up at the sight of vendors and booths being set up. When she learns of Carl's disappearance, she joins Rick, Michonne, and Dante in a mission to bring him back safely. Once they are held hostage by the Whisperers, a tribe of thousands disguised as roamers, she sees the marked border of territories where she witnesses dozens of people she knew from each of the communities with their heads on spikes.

After the massive walker herd swarms Alexandria, Andrea and a group of other survivors including Magna, Eugene and Yumiko try to lead the walkers away. Eugene and Andrea lead a large portion of the herd towards the ocean. Eugene attempts to lead more of the walkers away with the horn, but Andrea is reluctant. Andrea and the others stare in shock at the small wound on her neck which is revealed to be a bite from a walker. Upon returning to Alexandria, Rick and others say their farewells as she dies. Before her death, she reminds Rick to stay strong and continue to lead the community to rebuild society. Andrea reanimates as a walker and attempts to kill Rick, only for him to stab her in the head with a knife.

When Carl finds his own family, he names his daughter after Andrea.

=== Television series ===
==== Season 1 ====
Andrea, a civil rights attorney, along with her younger sister Amy are part of the quarry survivor camp outside of Atlanta. She is part of a scavenger group trapped in a department store in Atlanta when Rick Grimes arrives. After rescuing Rick, the group takes some time to plan out; during this, Andrea realizes that Amy's birthday is coming up and takes a necklace for her. Later, they are forced to handcuff Merle to pipes on the store's roof when he becomes violent, and end up leaving him there when they make their escape. The group eventually escape and make their way back to the quarry. Later, Rick and others go back to Atlanta to retrieve his gun bag. While they are gone, the quarry camp is overrun with walkers, and Amy is among those to be bitten. Andrea holds a dying Amy in her arms, putting the necklace on her, and tearfully telling her how much she loves her; however, as soon as Amy turns, Andrea shoots her, and hugs the body before she is buried with the others.

The group opts to leave the quarry and head for the Centers for Disease Control (CDC) in downtown Atlanta, hoping there will still be researchers there. However, only one, Dr. Jenner, remains, but he offers the group shelter. While the group enjoys the luxuries of the CDC, they learn that it is already running on emergency power and once the generators run out of fuel, the building will explode as a failsafe to kill the virulent samples it contains. While others in the group attempt to escape, Andrea and Jacqui elect to stay behind with Dr. Jenner, ready to die. Dale decides he will also stay along with Andrea to encourage her to come with him, as she still has much more to live for, Andrea was forced to come with him. They make it out of the building in time before it explodes. The group leaves Atlanta towards Fort Benning.

==== Season 2 ====
Due to several events, the group is allowed to take shelter on Hershel Greene's farmstead while they search for Sophia who went missing in the midst of a walker horde passage. Andrea is angry with Dale for denying her the choice to die. This intensifies when he agrees with Rick and Shane Walsh that only those who have been trained should be allowed firearms and later confiscates her father's gun. Andrea helps to keep watch over the farm. Lori Grimes also criticizes Andrea for not supporting the group through necessary chores such as cooking.

In the Greene household, Hershel's youngest daughter Beth becomes suicidal, and put on watch. During Andrea's watch, Andrea decides to leave the room, believing that Beth would come to realize that she didn't want to die by being left by herself, but Beth takes the opportunity to try to slit her wrists. Hershel and Maggie race to bandage her wounds, which were shallow and not lethal, but Maggie is furious with Andrea and bans her from the house. Despite her now-tense relationship with Dale she becomes the only one to stand with him at a group meeting against executing Randall Culver, an injured stranger who could've potentially disclosed their location to a hostile group. Dale is killed by a walker that night, leaving Andrea without her longest-surviving companion after her sister had died.

Eventually, the farm becomes overrun by walkers. Andrea is separated from the others, but as she escapes and is on the verge of collapsing from exhaustion she runs into a figure wielding a katana and leading two walkers on chains.

==== Season 3 ====
Andrea's rescuer is revealed to be Michonne, who helps to escort her over the next several months and the two bond. Andrea becomes ill, but Michonne is able to find medicine to help her. When they see a helicopter crash nearby, they go to investigate but find that it is already being scoured by Merle, who managed to escape by sawing off his hand and since replaced it with a prosthetic bayonet, and other men. Though they try to stay hidden, Andrea and Michonne are captured, with Merle recognizing Andrea from Atlanta, and taken back to Woodbury, a walled community being run by The Governor. The Governor allows them to stay, but Michonne is very uncomfortable about the community and makes plans to leave, while Andrea, tired of wandering, accepts the Governor's hospitality. Merle warns The Governor privately about the other members of Rick's group due to Andrea's appearance.

Andrea becomes a close confidant and of romantic interest to the Governor, and assists Milton in studying the walker epidemic. Later, Merle discovers and captures Glenn and Maggie, and takes him to the Governor who harshly interrogates them about where the rest of Rick's group is at. Michonne, who had seen this abduction, finds Rick's group, sheltered in a nearby prison, and she leads a small group back to rescue the pair. Michonne seeks out the Governor herself, discovering he has kept the still-animated heads of several walkers alive in fish tanks, as well as the re-animated body of his daughter Penny. She dispatches Penny, just as the Governor arrives, and the two fight, with Michonne ending up cutting out one of the Governor's eyes. She is about to kill him when Andrea arrives and warns Michonne away at gunpoint. Michonne flees with the rest of Rick's group, though Rick and Andrea catch sight of each other during this. However, Daryl has been captured after finding his brother is still alive, and Andrea is forced to watch as the Governor forces them to battle to the death, since Merle had lied to him. However, the brothers manage to escape when Rick's group return to help out.

The Governor is vengeful after the attack, but Andrea provides an inspirational speech to the Woodbury residents about rebuilding. The Governor compliments her, but secretly has Milton keep tabs on her. Andrea suggests that she could bridge the Woodbury and prison groups for a peaceful resolution, but the Governor refuses; however, he tells Milton to help Andrea escape and seek out the prison, so that they can find it themselves, planning on launching an attack in revenge. She makes it to the prison, but refuses to help Rick's group sneak back into Woodbury, and Carol instead suggests she assassinate the Governor. When she returns to Woodbury, she has the opportunity to kill a sleeping Governor but she is unable to strike the blow. Instead, Andrea arranges for the two sides to negotiate at a neutral location, but both Rick and the Governor refuse to allow her to join in their discussion. She discovers the Governor's plans to launch an attack at the prison, and tries to escape, but the Governor captures her just as she reaches the prison. Back in Woodbury, the Governor throws her in a torture cell, strapped to a chair. He then fatally wounds Milton, having come to determine he has turned against him, and leaves them, anticipating that Milton will die, reanimate, and kill Andrea. A dying Milton keeps enough consciousness to point Andrea to a set of tools just in her reach to cut her bonds.

The Governor launches his attack but Rick's group quickly overpowers them, forcing the Governor to flee elsewhere. Knowing Andrea may be in trouble at Woodbury, Rick and others head there, but arrive too late: Milton had turned, and while Andrea did free herself enough to subdue Milton's reanimated body, she has also been bitten. She is conscious enough to welcome her friends, and for them to say goodbyes to her. She asks Rick for his gun to end her own life, and the others leave as Michonne stays behind with Andrea before she commits suicide. Andrea's body is brought back to the prison to be buried.

==== Season 10 ====
Andrea appears in the tenth-season episode "What We Become" as one of Michonne's hallucinations. She is seen running through the woods from a herd of walkers, similar to when she and Michonne first met. Andrea is eventually forced to the ground by one of the walkers, and instead of saving her as she had done originally, Michonne leaves Andrea to be eaten alive and walks away. In a later hallucination, Michonne returns to her corpse and gathers her belongings.

==== Season 11 ====
In the eleventh season, Andrea is remembered in the form of flashbacks by both Michonne and Rick Grimes in the finale episode, "Rest in Peace." She is also one of the voices heard speaking the words "We're the ones who live."

== Development ==
=== Casting ===
Andrea is portrayed by Laurie Holden, who was cast as part of the series in 2010. Prior to the show, Holden had been in two of Frank Darabont's films, The Majestic (2001) and The Mist (2007); in the latter she starred with three other The Walking Dead cast members (Melissa McBride, Juan Pareja and Jeffrey DeMunn). Soon after being cast, she read through the comics to analyze and get a definite understanding of Andrea's character. She acknowledged her enjoyment of having a much more physical role than on some of her other past projects, as well as her excitement towards having her character gradually become a warrior like in the comics.

=== Characterization ===
Andrea, as she appears in the comic series, is described by The Hollywood Reporter's James Hibberd as "a key member of the survivor group who has a proficiency with a sniper rifle and falls for a man twice her age." Showrunner Scott M. Gimple (season 4–present) describes Andrea in the comic as having an "interesting evolution". He said: "There was a certain brashness and cockiness that she had. We've seen her mature." In the television series, she attempts suicide at the end of the first season, but Dale talks her out of this. Comic co-creator Robert Kirkman explained that her ensuing desire to protect herself would begin her evolution into her comic counterpart, "the fearless sharpshooter". On television, Andrea's motivation shifts following Dale's death. Holden allowed the event to color her portrayal, and for the remainder of season two, before each scene she filmed, she thought "Andrea, you must honor Dale." She explained that "every move that Andrea makes from that point forward is about honoring Dale, and that means being a leader, having a stronger moral compass, being compassionate and really lending her hand more so than she would have before." Former showrunner Glen Mazzara deemed Andrea the only character who could "hold [her] head up" after Dale's death, as she alone supported him against killing Randall and is "the one person who feels that she stood by him at the end."

=== Relationships ===
In the comic series, Andrea has a physical relationship with Dale. Holden was surprised to discover this while researching her role, but in March 2011, stated her intention to "honor the relationship well". However, Mazzara and Kirkman decided not to incorporate the relationship into the television series, and Dale was killed much sooner in the television series than he was in the comics. Holden was dismayed by his departure; she commented that she "love[d] the Dale-Andrea dynamic and ... felt like [they] had so much more story to explore together". For Kirkman, the effect of Dale's death on the continuing plot was worth sacrificing their relationship. He expressed his approval of the differences between the series and its source material, and advised viewers interested in the relationship storyline to read the comics.

Also in the comics, Andrea and Rick eventually become romantically involved within their time at the Alexandria Safe-Zone community. Their relationship, while genuine and affectionate, was initially shown to be strained, as Rick struggled to get over the deaths of his past lovers and Andrea found herself constantly at odds with some of Rick's decisions in life-threatening matters. Later, especially near the end of the war and two years later, Andrea and Rick's relationship is very intimate and close, as Carl looks to Andrea as a maternal figure, referring to her "mom".

Though Shane dies in the comics before the group reaches the farm, he remains alive longer in the television series. This resulted in alterations to the ensuing plot, including the creation of a relationship between Andrea and Shane. In season three, Andrea begins flirting with the Governor, the leader of a town she and Michonne are staying at, before she enters into a full-fledged romantic/sexual relationship with him.

=== Departure from show ===
The death of Andrea (Laurie Holden) in the television series marks one of the biggest departures from Robert Kirkman's source material in which Andrea played an active role within the series beyond this for a total of 13 years. In an interview published March 31, 2013, TVLine asked Holden how long in advance she knew about her character Andrea's death. Holden replied, "I didn't get the official word until a few days before we began [shooting] the finale. It was a shock to everyone. It was never part of the original story docs for Season 3. And it was rather unexpected." Robert Kirkman said: "The comics still exist and I'd urge those people to continue reading the comics where Andrea is still alive. Just know the show is something different and we are telling different stories. It doesn't mean we're not going to see a lot of the big stories and big events from the comic book in the TV show eventually; it just means those things will be a little bit altered from time to time. Hopefully it will be exciting, new and fresh just like it was the first time you read the comic, which is really the goal." Kirkman also said: "It's something that was debated quite a bit. There was a lot of opposition in the writers' room. I bounced back and forth between 'We really shouldn't kill her' and 'this is a good idea.' In the end it all came together and we decided to go for it. It was definitely something that divided the room to a certain extent."

Holden expressed desires of wanting to continue Andrea's story but she was grateful for the end result: "Do I wish we could've seen and explored more of the comic-book-Robert-Kirkman Andrea? Yes. Absolutely. Do I wish that I had more scenes with Michonne showing that friendship? Yes. Absolutely. But at the end of the day, I don't think I could ask for a better death. I feel like her life mattered, and she died trying, and her heart was in the right place. I feel grateful for that. You can't have it all."

Glen Mazzara said the decision to kill off Andrea occurred organically throughout the season, and talks of it emerged half-way through. He also addressed that he never planned to faithfully follow the comic book source material anyway, regarding the negative feedback from comic book readers. On the significance of Andrea's death, he said:

I thought it was important that we always show that no one is safe. It's also important to show the effect that these deaths have on our other characters. Andrea's death, for example, I knew Rick was going to finally open up the gates of the prison after a season in which he's trying to hide away from the world and lock everybody away and keep them safe. He realizes what that means -- that our group is now becoming isolated and will be picked off, that his own son is on the road to becoming the Governor (David Morrissey), so he has to open up the gates and let other people in and be compassionate. At the end of the finale, he brings in these women, children and elderly people and the group is going to transform. There needed to be a blood sacrifice for that, and there had to be a price that was paid. Andrea paying that price was important. She is unable to re-enter the group. In a way, a lot of what she did was bring the two groups together. But she's never able to enter the prison and be reunited in a full way with Rick's group. That was an ultimate sacrifice that was worthy of the season finale.

At Walker Stalker Con Chicago in 2014, Greg Nicotero and Laurie Holden discussed in depth the death of Andrea. They revealed there were three different versions of the script. One version included Andrea surviving the season finale and saving the people of Woodbury, leading them back to the prison. The other was the one that was written by Glen Mazzara and the aired one re-written partially by Scott Gimple. Holden felt that re-shooting her original death scene two months later was satisfying, because "she needed to be with her friends" and felt that she died with "grace" in the re-shoot as opposed to a "D-movie horror death" in the original run. Holden also revealed that the decision caused Glen Mazzara to lose his job as showrunner, as many of the writers were against the concept. Nicotero felt that Andrea's character got "lost in the writing" for the third season.

=== Departure from comic book series ===
The death of Andrea in the comic book series came four years later in "Issue #167" after the war with Negan and the Whisperers. Robert Kirkman issued an apology for killing Andrea and said, "“I'm sorry. I'm sorry to my fans and to myself and to Andrea. I feel like I killed a close friend. The deaths in this series are never taken lightly, they're never done with a sense of glee. They weigh on me the same way they weigh on you. These characters are very real to me, and their deaths are upsetting even to me. I plotted this issue out during a plane ride a few months ago. I plot my stories down with a pencil and paper, and there I was in my seat, blocking out scenes and writing dialog notes, surrounded by strangers who probably thought I was jotting down a shopping list. As I was writing some of the moments from this issue, I started crying. I found myself glancing around, wiping my eyes, hoping no one would notice. I've been living with this death for months now…and I don't like it. I had plenty of time to change my mind. I had plenty of time to just not do it. I am in control of this story after all. But honestly, sometimes it feels like I'm not. This was one of those times. I don't like this. I don't want this. I want Andrea to live. I want to write more stories with her. I want to see her and Rick grow old together, watching Carl grow up and have kids of his own. I want that kind of happiness for these characters. And yet, here we are. Andrea is dead and the story moves on. I don't know why this had to happen…but I know it did. I know this is another important turning point in the life of this series. I know Andrea's death will mean something, that will resonate in the stories moving forward for years to come. But I still don't like it. It still upsets me. I loved Andrea and I will truly miss her.”

== Reception ==
=== Comic book series response ===
The Weekly Crisis listed Andrea as #2 in their list of The Ten Best Characters in The Walking Dead, describing her as "Rick's real right hand, and she's definitely no man", commenting on her expert marksmanship, loyalty and positively calling Rick and Andrea a "power couple".

=== Television series response ===
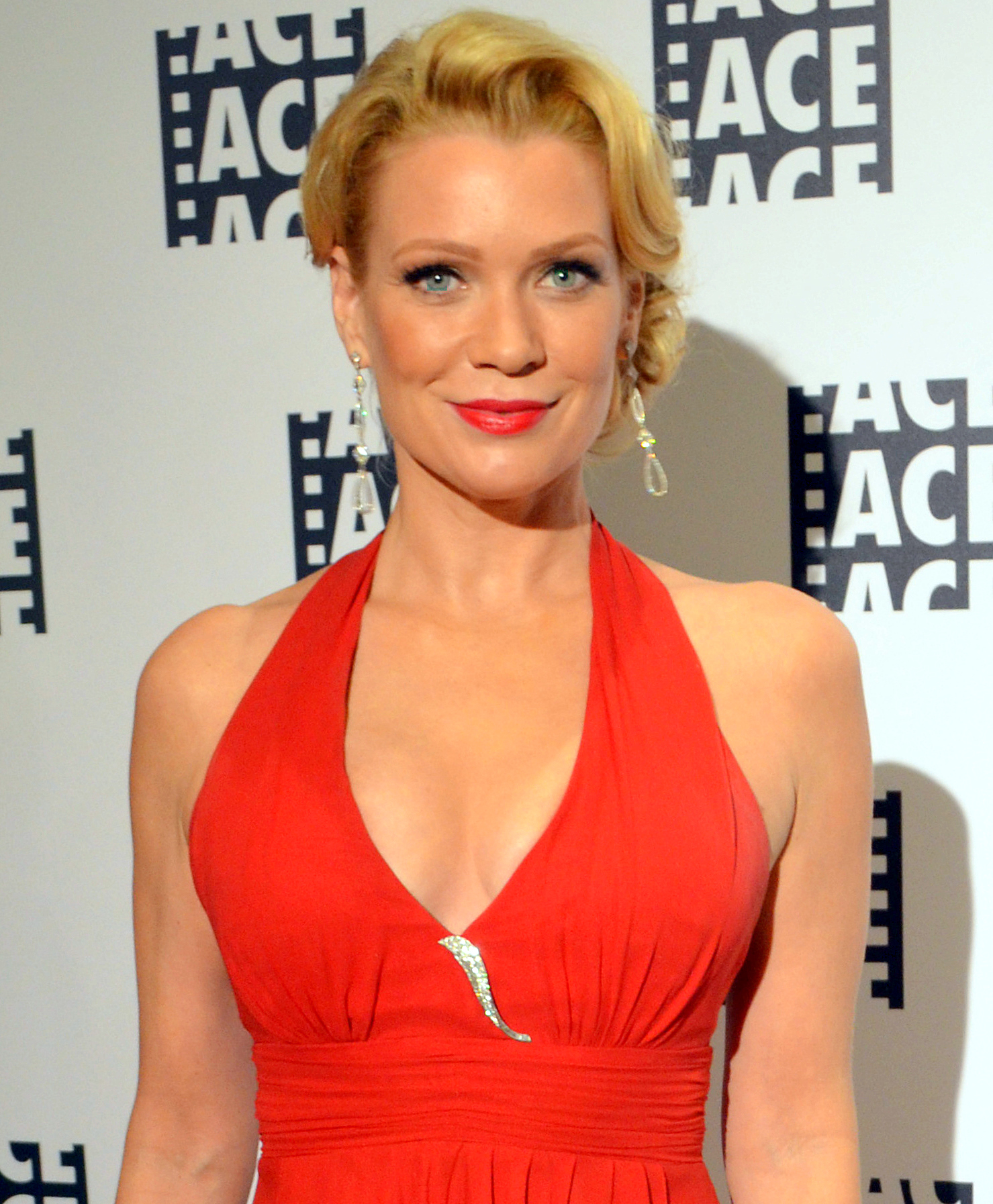
Holden's performance received favorable reviews from television critics.

Holden's performance as Andrea was well-received, particularly in the first and second seasons. Her character's role in the third season, however, was often criticized by critics and fans alike. Many praised the sisterly bond between Andrea and her sister, Amy (Emma Bell), her relationship with Dale and Andrea's grieving process and transformation into a skilled fighter by the end of the second season. For her performance in the first season, in 2011, Holden received a Saturn Award nomination for Best Supporting Actress on Television for her portrayal of Andrea. Her portrayal as Andrea in "TS-19" was particularly well received by MTV's Josh Wigler, who said she "delivered great character work." Similarly, Alan Sepinwall of HitFix ultimately cited the performance of Laurie Holden as an episode highlight.

For her performance in the second season, she was also nominated for a Best Supporting Actress Scream Award. For the season 2 premiere "What Lies Ahead", Derek Boeckelmann of the Daily Nexus praised the performance of Holden, saying that she "continues to be the strongest of the show's players, consistently putting forth exceptional performances as the grieving Andrea." Critics applauded the growing relationship between Andrea and Shane in the episode "Secrets". Despite describing them as an "unlikely pairing", Scott Meslow of The Atlantic asserted that it was superior to the storyline between Andrea and Dale. "There's something to be said for the occasional post-apocalyptic tryst, which allows two characters who've experienced almost nothing but misery to have, even for a moment, something that resembles joy," he articulated. Meslow retorted that it was wise to underplay the tryst between Shane and Andrea, which he predicted would not lead to anything serious.

The character development of Andrea produced uniform praise among critics in the season 2 finale, "Beside the Dying Fire". Writing for Paste, Josh Jackson felt that it served as the episode's highlight, and further assessed that she emulated actress Linda Hamilton. "After a season of whining, there had to have been at least a few fans pulling for the walkers in her early scenes, but she quickly became Linda Hamilton-badass, braining zombies with her foot," he said. Likewise, Kine asserted that "the badass she has tried so hard to convince us all she is finally came across." Ryan thought that Andrea's struggle to survive was a strong way to build up the exodus of the group. She spoke of her scene with Michonne: "She'd fought so hard to live that I wanted Andrea to fend off that final batch of walkers successfully. When it appeared she might not live, I was, quite rightly, on the edge of my seat. And the appearance of the caped figure—towing two armless walkers, no less—was as dramatic as could be."

Andrea's role in the third season is a significant departure from the comic book series. In comparison to previous seasons, her role was criticized and garnered generally negative critiques. Darren Franich of Entertainment Weekly commented negatively on Andrea's actions and her relationship with The Governor, invented for the show, saying: "The characters on Walking Dead appear stuck in their tracks, reliving the same traumas over and over. Will Andrea fall for next season's villain, too?" Entertainment Weekly later included Andrea in their list of "21 Most Annoying TV Characters Ever". Zack Handlen, writing for The A.V. Club felt that the climax of "I Ain't a Judas" didn't strengthen the sense of who Andrea is, and called the character "problematic" and "a mess", which "only becomes more obvious when she's asked to serve as the center of some kind of ongoing moral crisis." He then speculated whether "the horrible scripting" was responsible. Eric Goldman for IGN disliked the episode because it was Andrea-centric, a character he disliked particularly in the third season.

Andrea's death received a polarized reaction. For "Welcome to the Tombs", IGN writer Eric Goldman disliked that the finale rested its dramatic conclusion on Andrea's death. AV Club writer Zack Handlen said that Andrea would be "missed less" than Milton. Erik Kain of Forbes.com said that "Finally, Andrea is dead. I know this is something I've wished for all season, but it almost felt cheap at the end." Conversely, Josh Jackson, writing for Paste called the death "a heartbreaking end for the woman who tried to make piece [sic] between the two gangs of survivors." Despite the negative reception Andrea received for the third season, Holden was nominated for a Saturn Award for Best Supporting Actress for her work on The Walking Dead in 2013, and won.

Noel Murray of Rolling Stone ranked Andrea 18th in a list of 30 best Walking Dead characters, saying, "One of the biggest divergences between the comic book and the show has been the character of Andrea: She's practically a co-lead with Rick on the page yet became a surprise casualty in the show's third season. She had a good run though, with Laurie Holden playing her as shrewd enough to see through the Governor's beneficent facade, and friendly enough to bring the lone wolf Michonne into the fold. Even now, her steeliness and wits are missed. "

Carolyn Burke for Screen Rant ranked Andrea the best The Walking Dead character, writing, "Usually found on everyone's worst character list, Andrea is a great character who's been given a bad rap. Viewing her storyline from a new perspective changes everything [...] She planned to kill herself after losing her sister but her hand was forced. Those feelings never went away. That's why she behaved the way she did with Beth. Her actions were dangerous and ill-advised, but she truly believed she was sparing Beth from ending up in the same boat [...] It's why she clung to the false promises of the Governor -- the creature comforts of Woodbury were her only reason to live. It was a promise that life could be semi-normal. She didn't sell out her friends with fickle actions."

== Accolades ==
2011	Saturn Award	Best Supporting Actress on Television	The Walking Dead	Nominated
2011	Scream Award	Best Supporting Actress on Television	The Walking Dead	Nominated
2012	Satellite Award	Best Cast – Television Series	The Walking Dead	Won
2013	Saturn Award	Best Supporting Actress on Television	The Walking Dead	Won

== Merchandising ==
Among the various action figures released by McFarlane Toys, Andrea is featured in two line-ups. In the series 3 line-up of figures for Skybound's The Walking Dead comic book series, she wears a tank top and has two facial scars. Other accessories include her signature scoped rifle, along with a pistol and a knife. The figure is 5 to 5 1/2 inches in scale, and also has a black and white bloody version. Her television series counterpart also appears in the fourth line-up of its 4 to 4/12 inch figures. The figure comes with a pistol with leg holster, sniper rifle, and pitchfork from Hershel's farm.
