= The Walking Dead season 4 =

Fourth season of comic book-based television series

The Walking Dead
- Season 4
- Promotional poster and home media cover art featuring Rick Grimes
- Showrunner: Scott M. Gimple
- Starring: Andrew Lincoln; Norman Reedus; Steven Yeun; Lauren Cohan; Chandler Riggs; Danai Gurira; Melissa McBride; Scott Wilson; David Morrissey; Emily Kinney; Chad L. Coleman; Sonequa Martin-Green; Lawrence Gilliard Jr.
- No. of episodes: 16

Release
- Original network: AMC
- Original release: October 13, 2013 – March 30, 2014

Season chronology
- ← Previous; Season 3 Next → Season 5

The fourth season of The Walking Dead, an American post-apocalyptic horror television series on AMC, premiered on October 13, 2013, and concluded on March 30, 2014, consisting of 16 episodes. Developed for television by Frank Darabont, the series is based on the eponymous series of comic books by Robert Kirkman, Tony Moore, and Charlie Adlard. It was executive produced by Kirkman, David Alpert, Scott M. Gimple, Greg Nicotero, Tom Luse, and Gale Anne Hurd, with Gimple assuming the role of showrunner after Glen Mazzara's departure from the series. The fourth season received critical acclaim from critics. It was nominated for multiple awards and won three, including Best Syndicated/Cable Television Series for the second consecutive year, at the 40th Saturn Awards.

This season adapts material from issues #40–61 of the comic book series and introduces notable comic characters, including Bob Stookey (Lawrence Gilliard Jr.), Sgt. Abraham Ford (Michael Cudlitz), Dr. Eugene Porter (Josh McDermitt) and Rosita Espinosa (Christian Serratos), as well as the Chambler Family, a modified version of the Chalmers Family from a tie-in novel, The Walking Dead: Rise of the Governor.

The season continues the story of Rick Grimes (Andrew Lincoln) and his group of survivors as they continue to survive in a post-apocalyptic world invaded by flesh-eating zombies, dubbed "walkers". Set several months after the attack on the prison by The Governor (David Morrissey) and his army, Rick has renounced his leadership in order to live a quiet and more peaceful life in contrast to his cold-hearted nature in the previous season. Striving to hold onto humanity, Rick and his fellow survivors struggle to maintain their close to an ideal life at the prison as problems arise in the face of new evil, and threats within and outside the premises, including a deadly flu strain and the return of the vengeful Governor.

== Production ==
A fourth season of the show, consisting of 16 episodes, was confirmed in December 2012. Production began in Senoia, Georgia on May 6, 2013. In July 2013, it was reported that David S. Goyer would be directing the penultimate episode of the season, however Goyer did not direct the episode due to scheduling conflicts. Greg Nicotero, who replaced Goyer, directed three episodes for the season, while Tricia Brock and Ernest Dickerson each directed two episodes. Michelle MacLaren returned this season to direct the season finale, after previously directing episodes in seasons one and two. Comic book co-creator Robert Kirkman wrote two episodes of the season. Filming was completed on November 23, 2013.

=== Inspirations ===
In an interview with showrunner Scott Gimple, he shares: "The ultimate inspiration for The Walking Dead is the comic book. Sometimes, we can go far away from the comic book story, but often we ultimately serve the comic book story. And even when we go far away from it, we're inspired by it - and the novels as well. And then beyond that, all of the great stuff that we have consumed along the way, from zombie movies to Star Wars to other comics to really highbrow movies like The Grand Illusion to Jaws. And also really, world history. The plague storyline was inspired by both Camus' The Plague and other stories about the plague I heard in Edinburgh. But really, it starts with the comic book."

=== Webisodes ===
Following the two previous web series in 2011 and 2012, another set of webisodes titled The Oath was released on October 1, 2013.

=== Talking Dead ===
A third season of the live talk show aired alongside the fourth season of The Walking Dead.

== Cast ==
=== Main cast ===
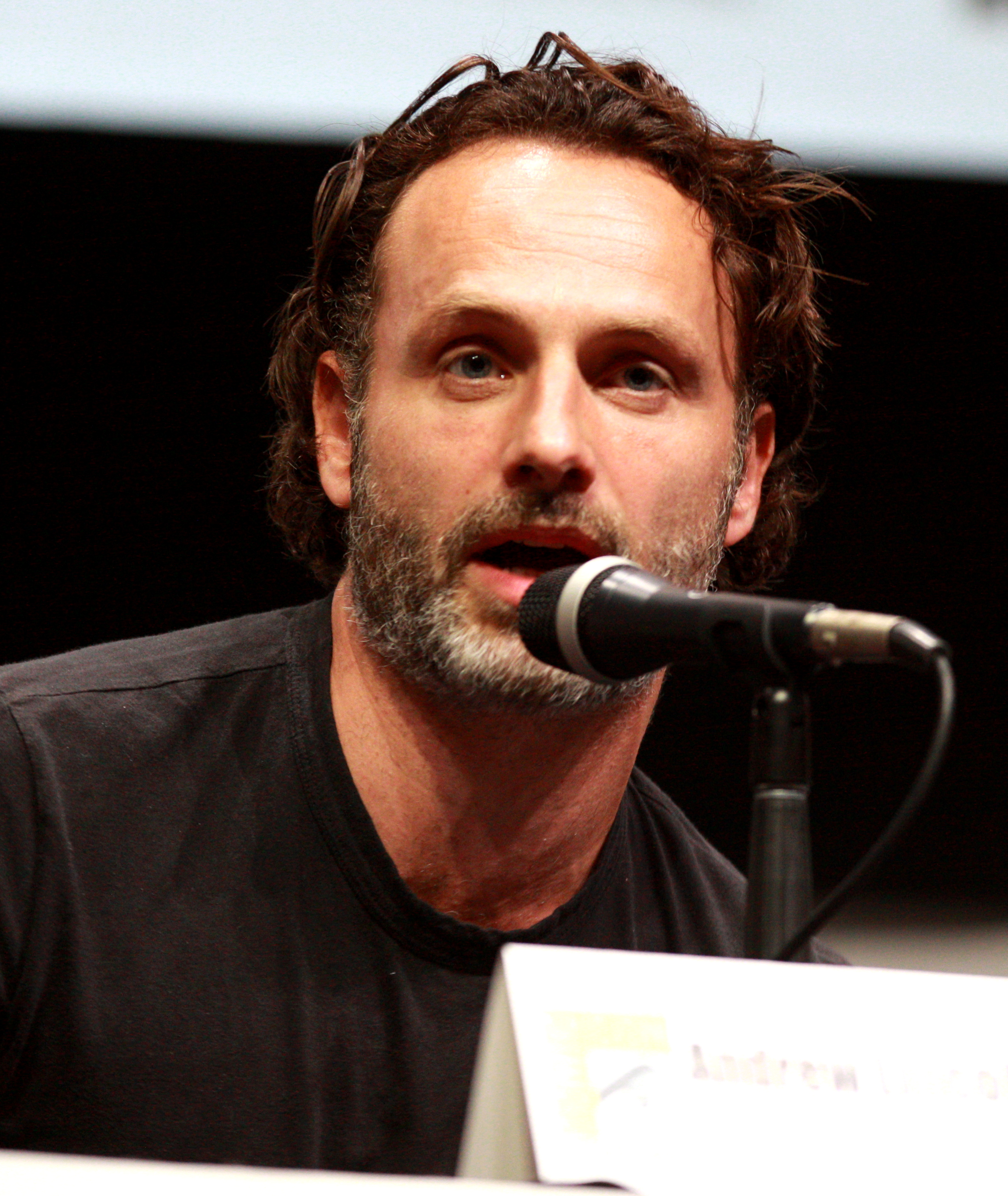
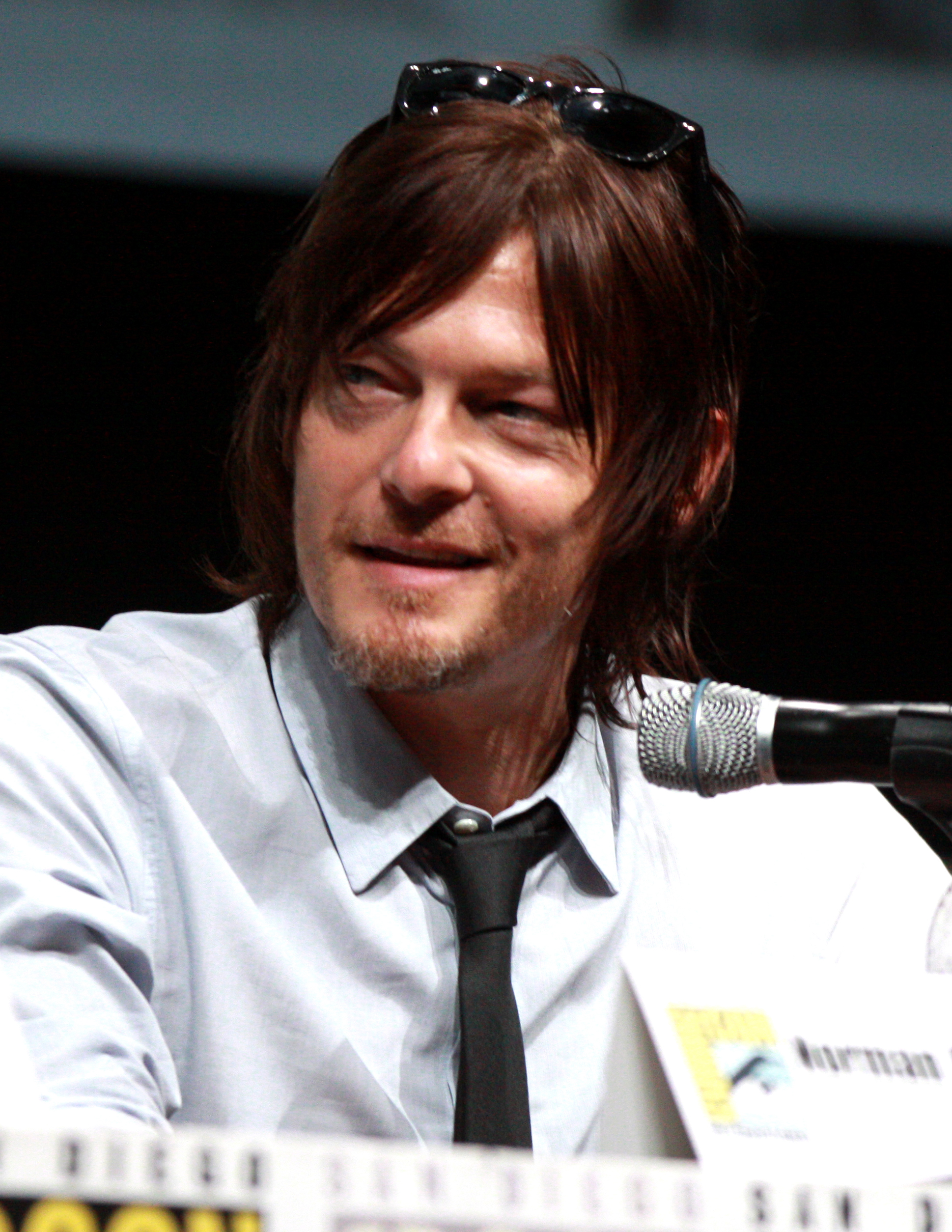
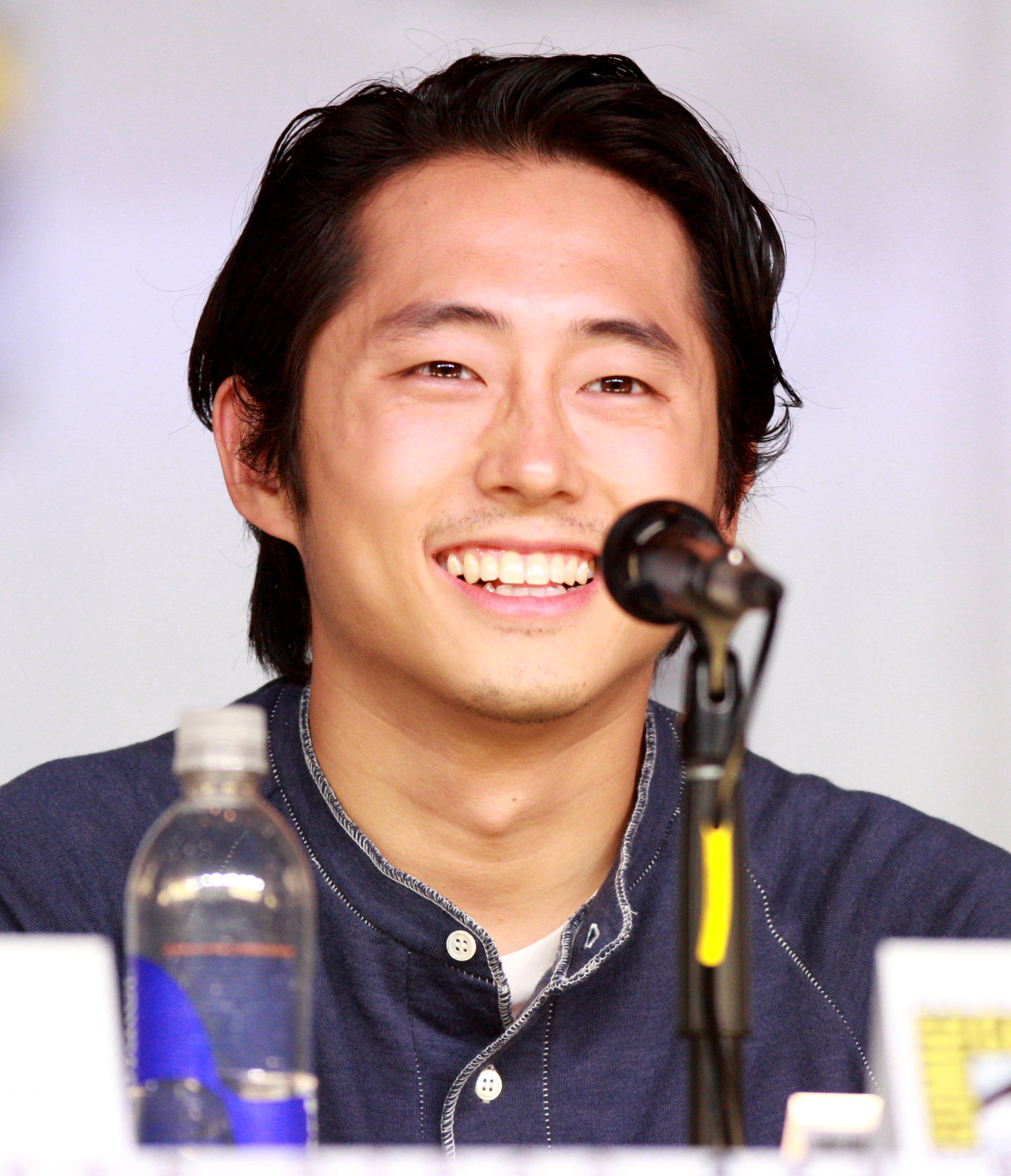
Andrew Lincoln (Rick Grimes), Norman Reedus (Daryl Dixon), Steven Yeun (Glenn Rhee)
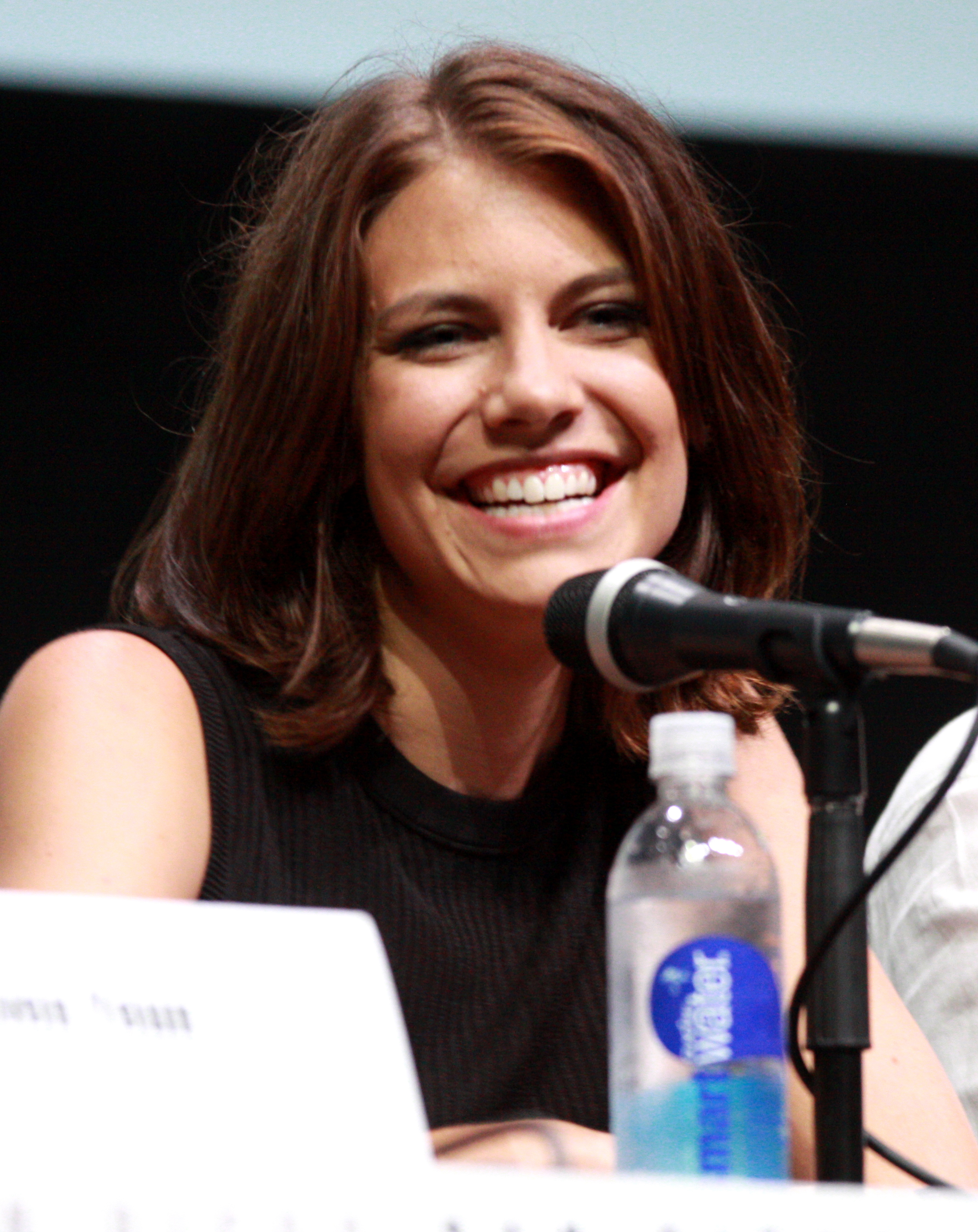
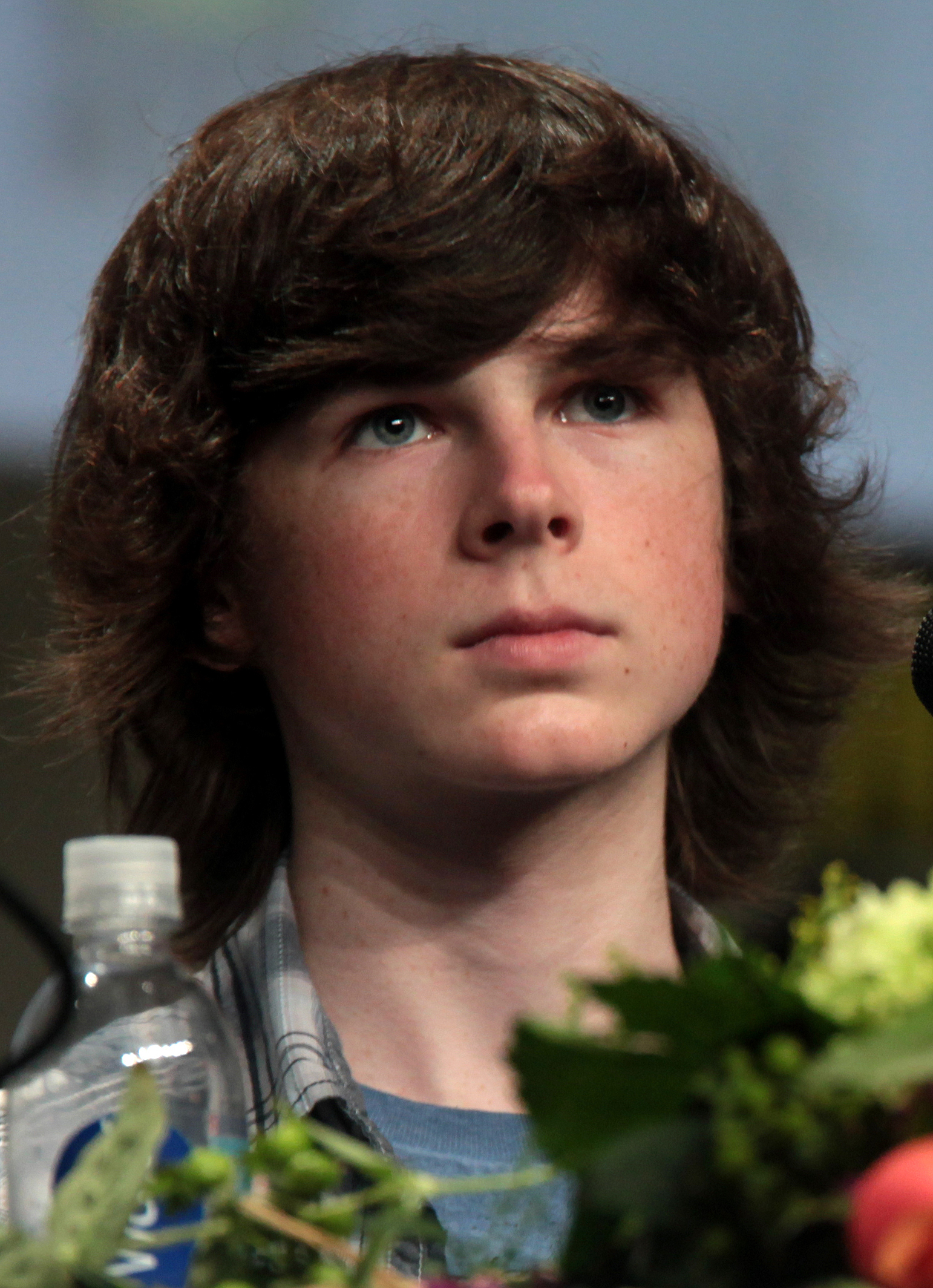
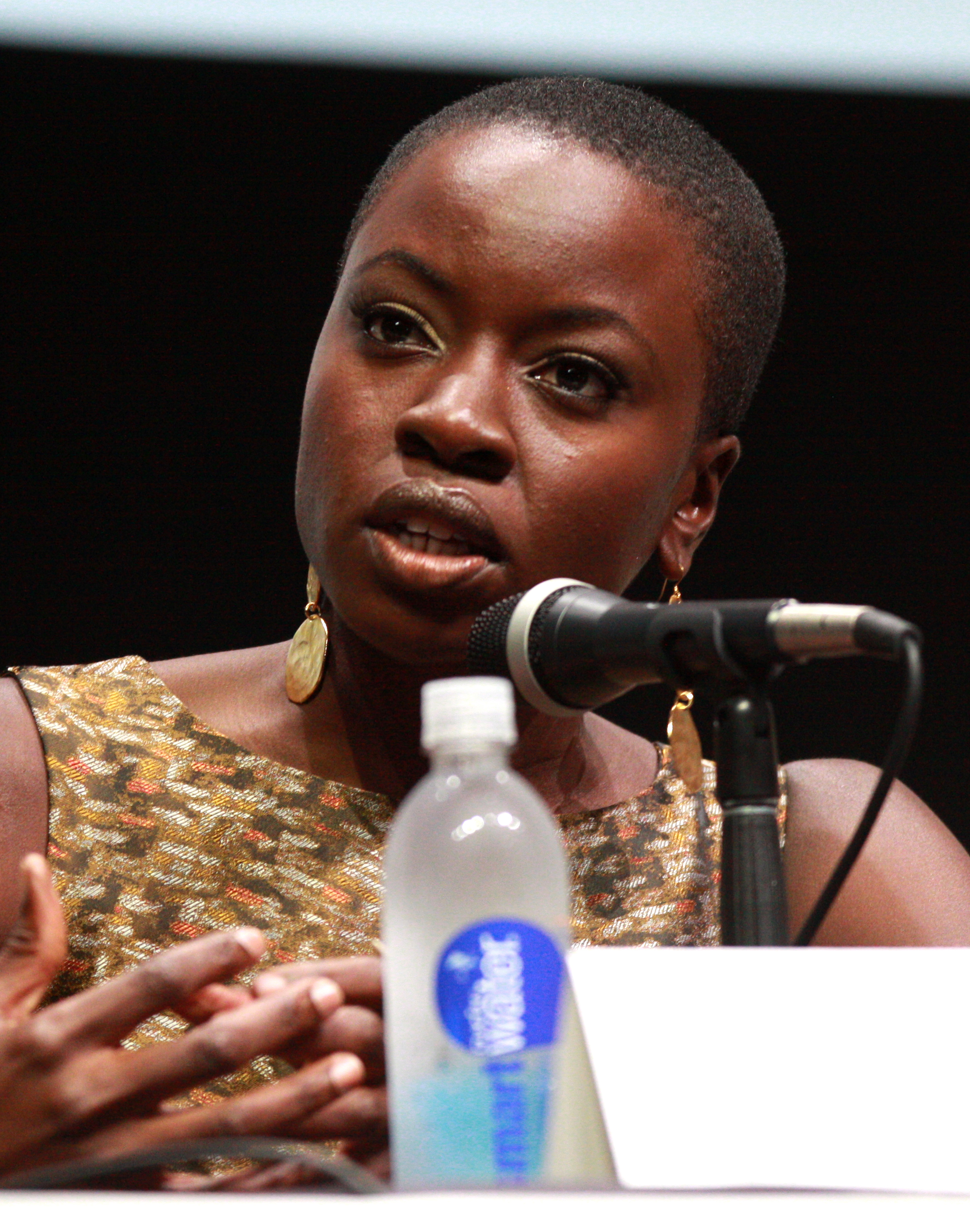
Lauren Cohan (Maggie Greene), Chandler Riggs (Carl Grimes), Danai Gurira (Michonne)
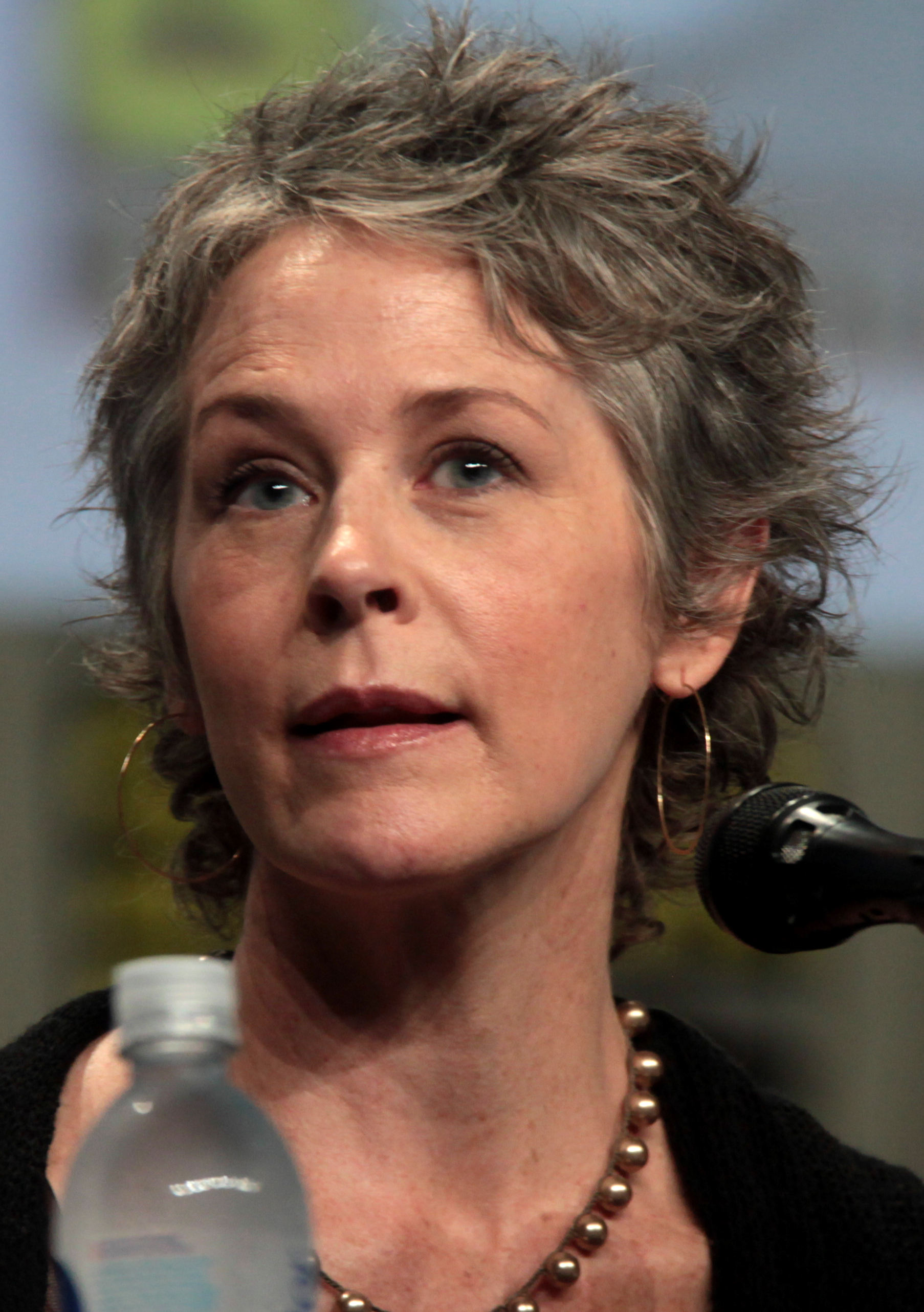
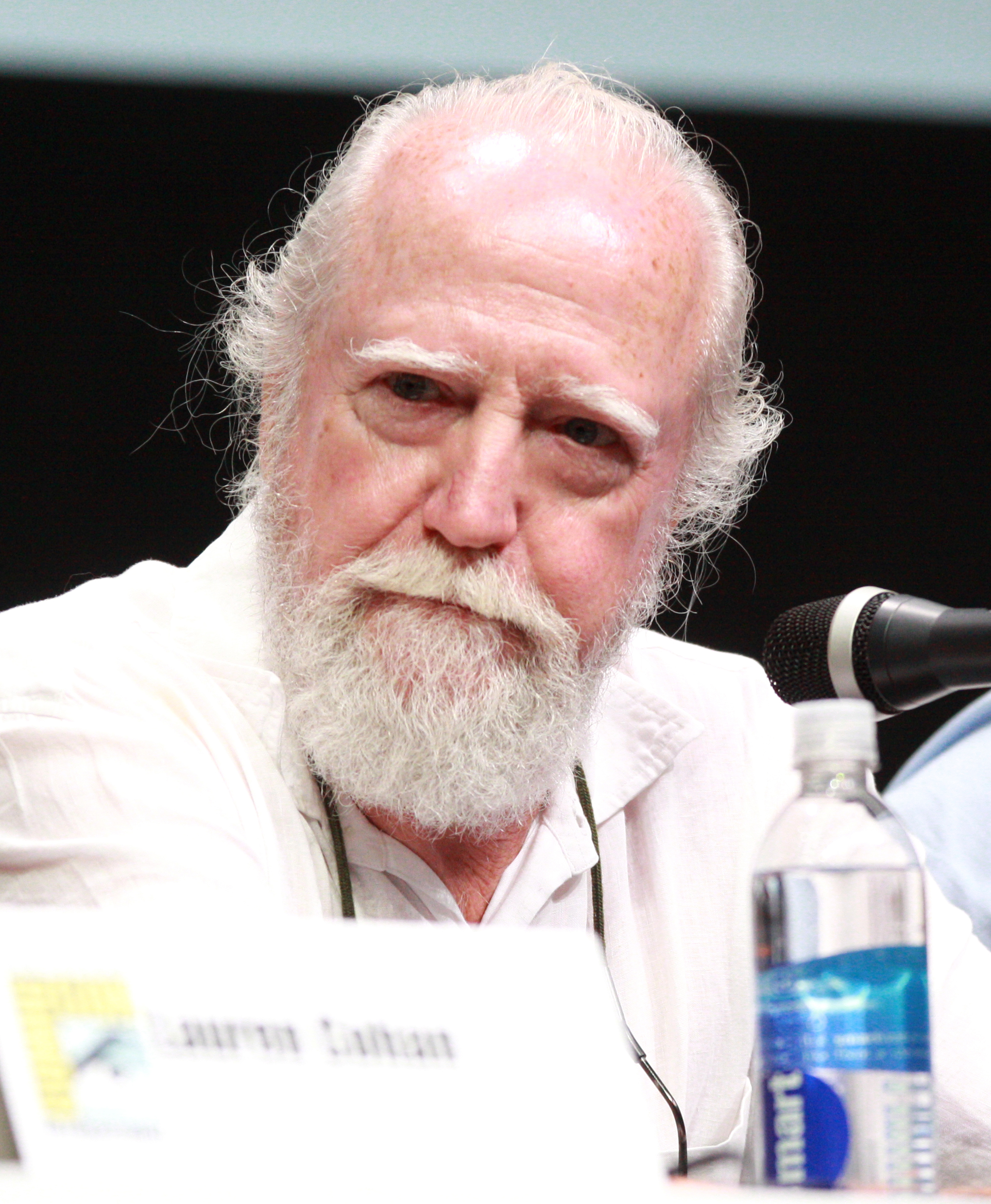
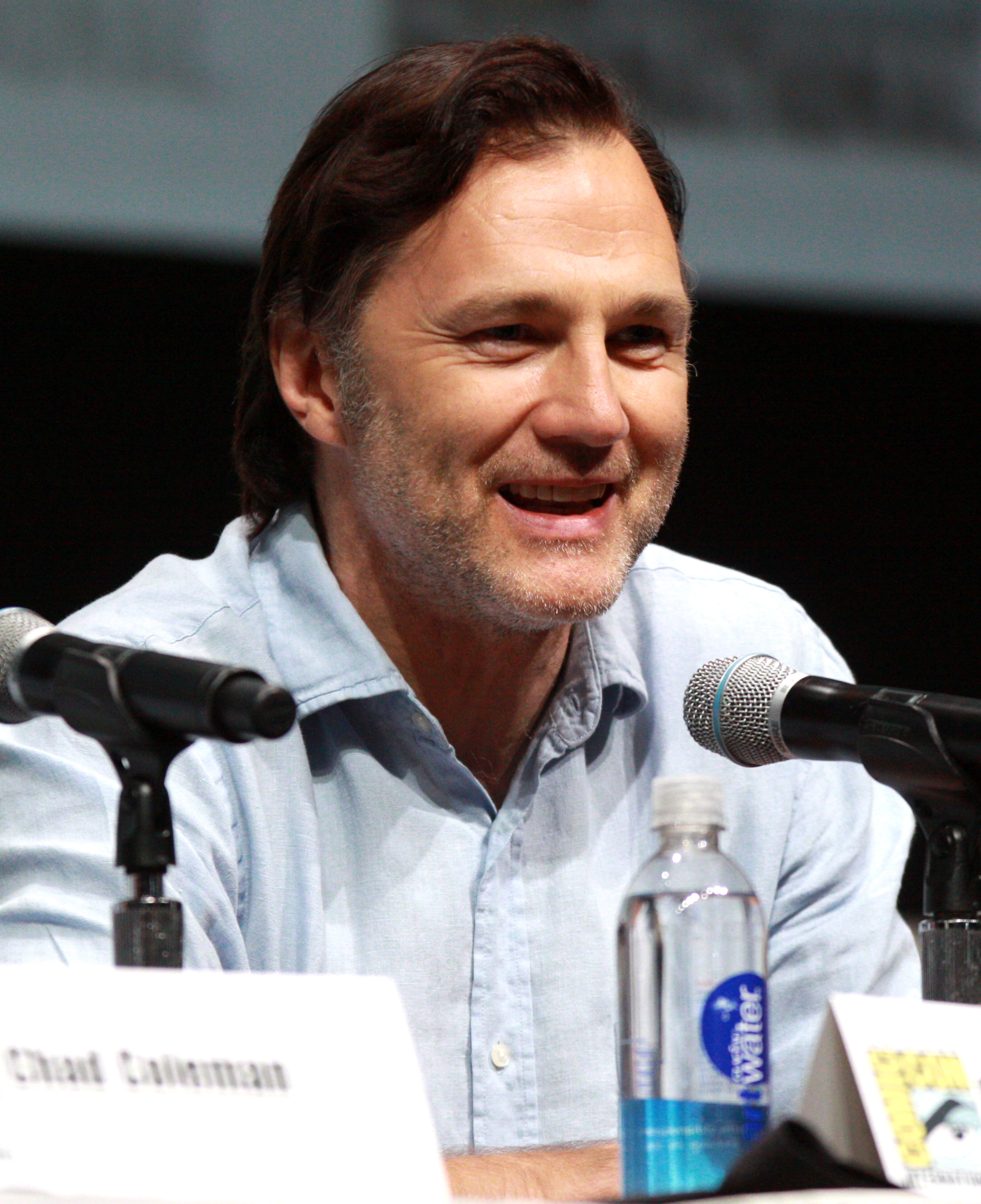
Melissa McBride (Carol Peletier), Scott Wilson (Hershel Greene), David Morrissey (The Governor)
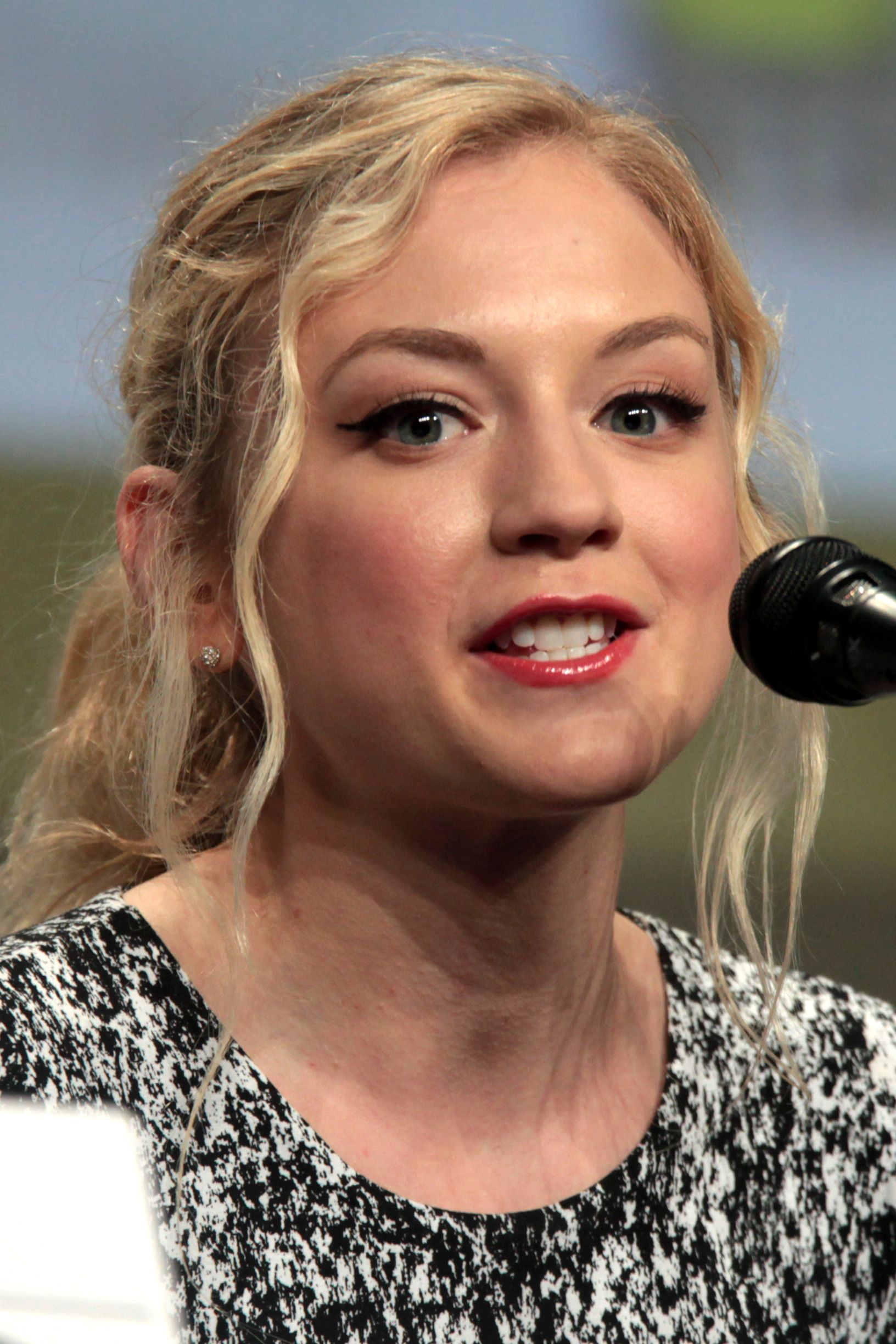
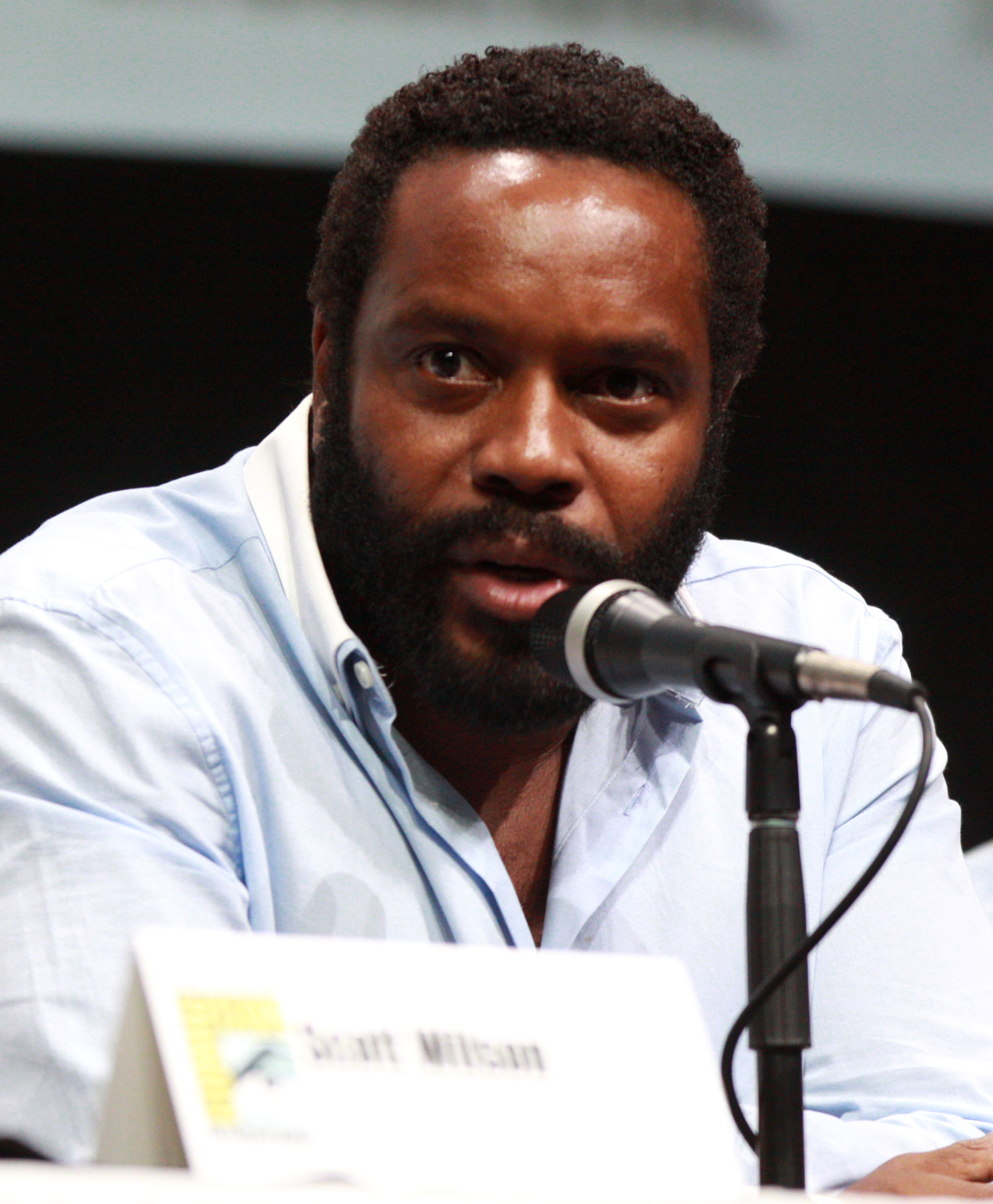
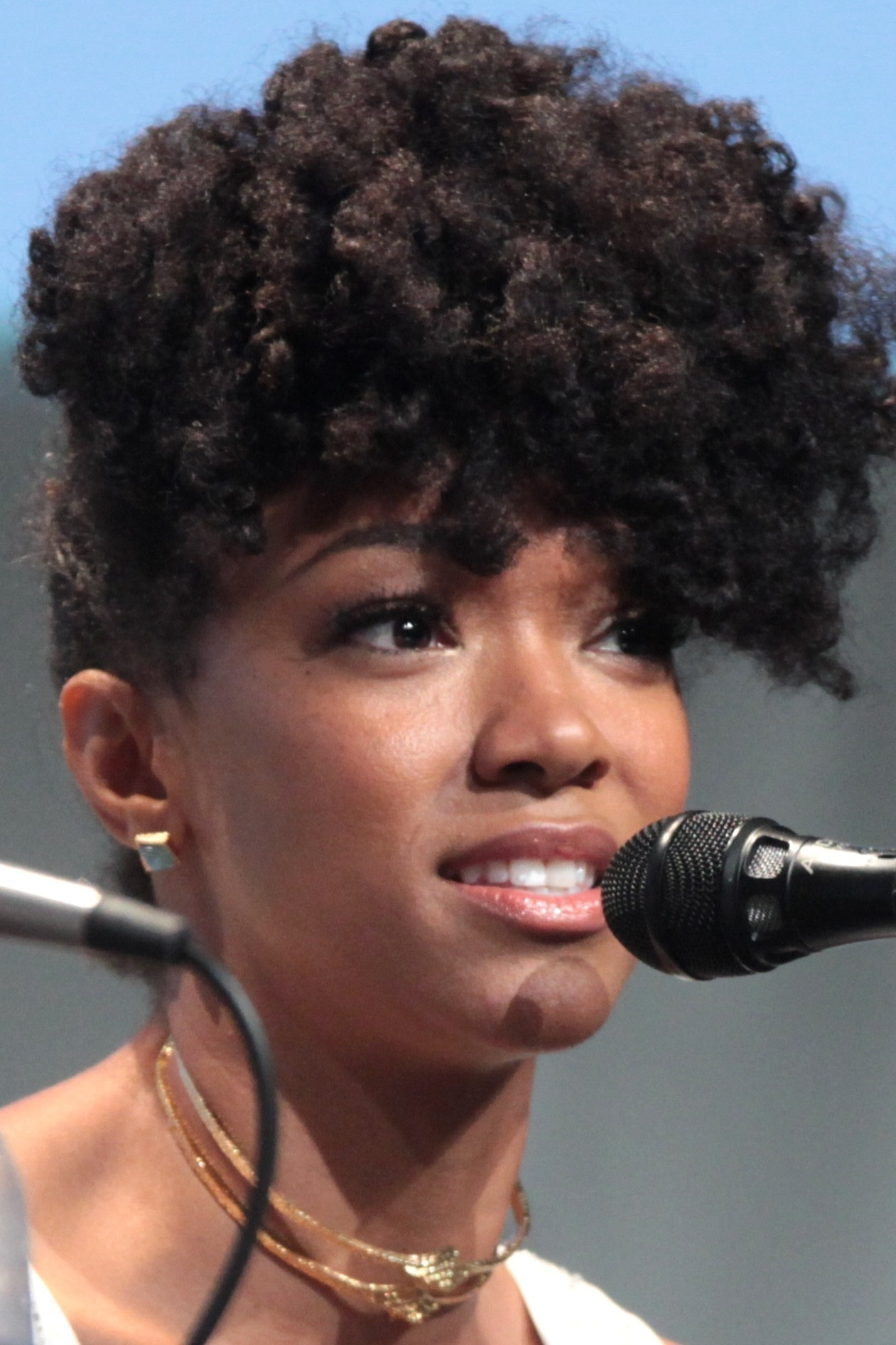
Emily Kinney (Beth Greene), Chad L. Coleman (Tyreese Williams), Sonequa Martin-Green
(Sasha Williams)

The fourth season features thirteen series regulars, with nine actors receiving opening credits billing, while four others are credited as "Also starring". Melissa McBride and Scott Wilson, who portray Carol Peletier and Hershel Greene, respectively, were added in the opening sequence after previously being credited as "Also starring". David Morrissey, who plays The Governor, is not credited among the main cast until his reappearance in the episode "Live Bait". Credited as "Also starring" are Emily Kinney (Beth Greene), Chad L. Coleman (Tyreese Williams), and Sonequa Martin-Green (Sasha Williams), who were promoted from recurring status, and Lawrence Gilliard Jr., who joins the main cast as Bob Stookey. Wilson and Morrissey were both removed from the opening credits, and as series regulars after the episode "After". However, Wilson was re-added to the opening credits and as a series regular for the season finale, "A".

==== Starring ====
- Andrew Lincoln as Rick Grimes, the series' protagonist, the father of Carl and Judith, and a former sheriff's deputy, who recently relinquished his leadership over the survivor group out of disgust towards his own previous actions as leader.
- Norman Reedus as Daryl Dixon, an antihero-like Southern redneck, who is also the group's primary hunter and has a strong bond with Carol, and later forms a bond with Beth.
- Steven Yeun as Glenn Rhee, a former pizza delivery man married to Maggie Greene, who has matured over the series.
- Lauren Cohan as Maggie Greene, Hershel's elder daughter, Beth's half-sister, and Glenn's wife, who is a determined, fierce and capable fighter.
- Chandler Riggs as Carl Grimes, Rick's adolescent son. Brave to a fault, Carl begins to develop a callous mentality in response to the lethal landscape of a savage, new world. However he is also emotionally conflicted with himself because of the brutality of his previous choices in the new world.
- Danai Gurira as Michonne, a quiet and meticulous, yet fierce woman, who has recently joined Rick's group. She has begun to bond with the group, and shares a close bond with Rick's son Carl but is still fierce and secretive of her past.
- Melissa McBride as Carol Peletier, a former victim of domestic abuse, who has empowered herself but has come to make several dark and questionable decisions for the good of her group. She is the only known female Atlanta camp survivor left.
- Scott Wilson as Hershel Greene, a religious former veterinarian and farmer, who is protective of his daughters. He maintains his faith despite many tragic events and acts as the group's primary moral compass as well as a surrogate father figure to Rick and Glenn.
- David Morrissey as The Governor, the former leader of the now-abandoned Woodbury and a primary threat to the prison community, and the primary antagonist of the first half of the season, who is now calling himself "Brian Heriot". Having become alarmed of his cold ways he is attempting to redeem himself by caring for a family he encounters.

==== Also starring ====
- Emily Kinney as Beth Greene, a soft-spoken teenage girl, Hershel's younger daughter, and Maggie's younger half-sister. Beth has become emotionally numb but is secretly still emotionally fragile, and later forms a bond with Daryl.
- Chad L. Coleman as Tyreese Williams, Sasha's peace-keeping older brother and one of the few survivors of Woodbury and Karen's boyfriend.
- Sonequa Martin-Green as Sasha Williams, Tyreese's younger sister, who is seemingly fiery, ruthless and cold but deep down is a compassionate young woman. She has also developed an attraction to Bob.
- Lawrence Gilliard Jr. as Bob Stookey, a former army medic, who struggles to recover from alcoholism. He also develops an attraction to Sasha.

=== Supporting cast ===
==== The Prison ====
- Brighton Sharbino as Lizzie Samuels, a young girl, who has joined the prison community and suffers from psychological problems and obsessed with walkers.
- Kyla Kenedy as Mika Samuels, Lizzie's younger sister, who has also joined the prison community.
- Sunkrish Bala as Dr. Caleb Subramanian, a doctor, who has joined the prison community and is more commonly known as "Dr. S".
- Luke Donaldson as Luke, a young boy, who has joined the prison community.
- Sherry Richards as Jeanette, a former Woodbury resident, who has joined the prison community.
- Vincent Martella as Patrick, a young teenager, who has joined the prison community.
- Melissa Ponzio as Karen, Tyreese's new love interest and the lone survivor of the Woodbury army massacre.
- Kennedy Brice as Molly, a young girl, who develops a friendship with Lizzie, Mika, and Luke.
- Victor McCay as Ryan Samuels, Lizzie and Mika's father.
- Kyle Gallner as Zach, a survivor, who has joined the prison community and forms a relationship with Beth.

==== Chambler family ====
- Alanna Masterson as Tara Chambler, a police academy attendee, who was surviving with her family before encountering The Governor.
- Audrey Marie Anderson as Lilly Chambler, a former nurse, Meghan's mother, and Tara's sister, who develops a relationship with The Governor.
- Danny Vinson as David Chambler, is the father of Tara and Lily and the grandfather of Meghan who suffers from terminal cancer.
- Meyrick Murphy as Meghan Chambler, Lilly's daughter, who begins to see The Governor as a father figure.

==== Martinez's camp ====
- Jose Pablo Cantillo as Caesar Martinez, one of The Governor's most trusted allies, who leads a new group of survivors.
- Kirk Acevedo as Mitch Dolgen, a former tank operator, who has joined Martinez's new group.
- Juliana Harkavy as Alisha, a former member of the army reserves, who forms a relationship with Tara.
- Enver Gjokaj as Pete Dolgen, a member of Martinez's group and Mitch's brother.

==== Abraham's group ====
- Michael Cudlitz as Sgt. Abraham Ford, a former soldier trying to get Eugene to Washington, D.C. so he can stop the outbreak.
- Christian Serratos as Rosita Espinosa, a young Hispanic woman, who is Abraham's girlfriend.
- Josh McDermitt as Dr. Eugene Porter, a scientist, who claims to know what caused the outbreak and is being escorted by Abraham and Rosita to government officials in Washington, D.C.

==== The Claimers ====
- Jeff Kober as Joe, leader of a small group of heavily armed marauders called the "Claimers", who live by the philosophy of "claiming" and the primary antagonist of the second half of the season.
- Davi Jay as Tony, a right-hand of Joe and member of Joe's group.
- Marcus Hester as Len, a hostile member of Joe's group, who forms an antagonism with Daryl.
- Keith Brooks as Dan, a sexually deviant member of Joe's group.
- Scott Dale as Lou, a member of Joe's group, the first one who faces Rick.
- J. D. Evermore as Harley, a member of Joe's group.
- Eric Mendenhall as Billy, a ruthless member of Joe's group.

==== Terminus ====
- Denise Crosby as Mary, a resident of Terminus, who greets survivors that arrive there.
- Andrew J. West as Gareth, the mysterious leader of Terminus.
- Tate Ellington as Alex, a member of Terminus.

==== Miscellaneous ====
- Kerry Condon as Clara, a mysterious woman Rick encounters in the forest.
- Robin Lord Taylor as Sam, a survivor encountered by Rick and Carol.
- Brina Palencia as Ana, a survivor traveling with Sam, who is encountered by Rick and Carol.
- Aldis Hodge as Mike, Michonne's former boyfriend, who appears in a flashback.
- Brandon Fobbs as Terry, Michonne's former friend, who appears in a flashback.

Lennie James was initially reported to return as Morgan Jones, Rick's first human encounter in the apocalypse, however showrunner Scott M. Gimple confirmed that he would not appear in the fourth season, saying that he was misquoted. Despite this, Gimple stated that Morgan would return in later seasons. Morgan eventually returned in the series' fifth season.

== Episodes ==
No. overall	No. in season	Title	Directed by	Written by	Original release date	U.S. viewers (millions)
36	1	"30 Days Without an Accident"	Greg Nicotero	Scott M. Gimple	October 13, 2013	16.11
Rick's group has brought the survivors from Woodbury into the prison, and Rick has renounced leadership of the group. The prison has proven a haven for many months, while Michonne continues to search for The Governor, fearing his retribution. Patrick, one of new survivors, comes down with a fatal illness, dies, and reanimates as a walker.
37	2	"Infected"	Guy Ferland	Angela Kang	October 20, 2013	13.95
The reanimated Patrick manages to attack other survivors in a cell block, and the group is forced to kill off those bitten and relocate the others to a different block. They discover a deadly flu strain, brought by pigs that Rick tried to raise, affecting some of the survivors and which killed Patrick. Those infected are isolated, fearing they will reanimate when they die. Tyreese discovers his girlfriend Karen and her friend David, both considered infected, were killed and burnt by someone unknown.
38	3	"Isolation"	Dan Sackheim	Robert Kirkman	October 27, 2013	12.92
The illness continues to spread and Hershel takes responsibility to stay with the infected to tend to them. Daryl leads a group to a nearby veterinary college to recover medicine to cure the illness, though en route, overhear a radio broadcast directing people to "sanctuary". Rick discovers Carol killed Karen and David, acting on her own but for the good of the survivors.
39	4	"Indifference"	Tricia Brock	Matthew Negrete	November 3, 2013	13.31
Daryl's group completes their run to the hospital, while Rick and Carol go scavenging for supplies at a local residential area. After trying to help a couple return to the prison, only to have the wife die and the husband disappear. Rick tells Carol that she cannot come back to the prison and the two depart on separate ways.
40	5	"Internment"	David Boyd	Channing Powell	November 10, 2013	12.20
The infected survivors begin to succumb to the illness and reanimate as walkers, forcing the survivors to start to kill their friends. At the same time, Rick and Carl have to deal with a big group of walkers who breached the fence. Daryl's group returns in time for Hershel and Bob to help administer the medicine and cure the remaining infected. Carol's absence from the group is noticed but Rick only confides in his choice to a select few. As the survivors recover and try to return to a regular routine, they are unaware they are being watched from afar by The Governor.
41	6	"Live Bait"	Michael Uppendahl	Nichole Beattie	November 17, 2013	12.00
In a flashback episode, The Governor is abandoned by Martinez and Shumpert following his attack on the prison. He sets Woodbury ablaze and later encounters the Chamblers, Lilly, Tara, Lilly's daughter Meghan and their dying father. He hides his identity while helping them to deal with their father and the three opt to leave with him when he moves on. They come across another group of survivors - this being led by Martinez.
42	7	"Dead Weight"	Jeremy Podeswa	Curtis Gwinn	November 24, 2013	11.29
While still in flashback, Martinez recognizes The Governor has taken a new identity and privately explains how he found this new group and their arsenal of weapons. The Governor senses the group is weak and with the power of their arsenal, believes he can secure the prison for a haven for the Chamblers. He kills Martinez and his right-hand man, taking charge of the group and organizes the group to head to the prison. The Governor, observing the prison, sees Michonne and Hershel outside its fence, burning the corpses of the infected.
43	8	"Too Far Gone"	Ernest Dickerson	Seth Hoffman	December 1, 2013	12.05
The Governor captures Michonne and Hershel and challenges Rick and the others to abandon the prison. Though Rick offers co-existence, The Governor refuses, decapitates Hershel and gunfire breaks out. In the midst of battle, Lilly rushes up to The Governor with the body of Meghan, who was bitten by a walker while playing. The Governor shoots Meghan to prevent her from reanimating and then orders a full-out assault of the prison, tearing through its fences and allowing a horde of walkers in. The survivors in the prison are forced to scatter when they no longer can hold their defenses. At the same time, Rick and The Governor engage in a one-on-one brawl in which the latter gains the upper hand, only to be mortally stabbed by Michonne just before he can kill Rick. Rick escapes with Carl, while the near-death Governor is approached and executed by Lilly.
44	9	"After"	Greg Nicotero	Robert Kirkman	February 9, 2014	15.76
Carl helps his injured father Rick as they flee the prison and fearful they have lost Lori's child. They take shelter in a suburban home and Rick collapses from exhaustion. Carl scavenges nearby homes for supplies. Michonne, finding the prison overrun and no sign of the survivors, sets off on her own but comes to an epiphany about her purpose and follows Carl and Rick's trail, rejoining them at the home where they are sheltering.
45	10	"Inmates"	Tricia Brock	Matthew Negrete & Channing Powell	February 16, 2014	13.34
Daryl helps to protect Beth as they flee and search for survivors. Tyreese, having saved Lori's child Judith, escorts young sisters Lizzie and Mika and is soon joined by Carol. Maggie, Sasha and Bob find the bus from the prison, the survivors inside dead and reanimated as walkers, though Maggie is relieved that Glenn is not among them. Glenn, having been knocked unconscious at the prison, finds a frightened Tara and helps to lead her to safety, coming across Abraham, Eugene and Rosita in their travels.
46	11	"Claimed"	Seith Mann	Nichole Beattie & Seth Hoffman	February 23, 2014	13.12
As Rick, Carl and Michonne rest, their home is discovered by a group of men called Claimers and they are forced to abandon it, later finding signs towards "Terminus" along railroad tracks. Glenn and Tara learn that Abraham and Rosita are escorting Eugene to Washington, D.C. as he knows how to stop the walker outbreak once there.
47	12	"Still"	Julius Ramsay	Angela Kang	March 2, 2014	12.61
Beth continues to travel with Daryl and becomes distraught she might die before having a drink of alcohol, something Hershel prevented. After scavenging through a country club and only finding peach schnapps, Daryl takes her to a cabin he had found earlier that was used to make moonshine and tells her that is a proper drink. As they get inebriated, Daryl sadly discusses his past and what Merle meant to him. They decide to burn down the cabin as a way of putting their past behind them.
48	13	"Alone"	Ernest Dickerson	Curtis Gwinn	March 9, 2014	12.65
While following signs to Terminus, Maggie, Sasha and Bob disagree on what they should do. Maggie, still anxious about Glenn's fate, leaves on her own. Bob leaves to follow her trail, while Sasha decides to remain in a small town and ultimately saves Maggie from a horde of walkers and agrees to continue with her. Daryl and Beth come across a church where they take refuge but when the church is invaded by walkers, Daryl covers for Beth's escape, during which she is captured by someone in a car with a white cross on its back windshield. Daryl is suddenly captured by another group of men.
49	14	"The Grove"	Michael E. Satrazemis	Scott M. Gimple	March 16, 2014	12.87
Tyreese, Carol, Lizzie, Mika and Judith follow signs to Terminus and come across a cabin where they plan to take a few days of rest. Tyreese and Carol find Lizzie has an unhealthy fascination with walkers. Later, after coming back with supplies, they find Lizzie has killed Mika and is about to kill Judith, hoping they will come back as walkers. Carol and Tyreese agree Lizzie is too dangerous to keep around and Carol kills her. Carol opens up about having killed Tyreese's friend Karen, which he forgives her for. They leave the cabin and continue to Terminus.
50	15	"Us"	Greg Nicotero	Nichole Beattie & Seth Hoffman	March 23, 2014	13.47
Glenn, Tara, Abraham, Eugene and Rosita continue towards Terminus and they find a sign by a tunnel written by Maggie to Glenn. Abraham fears the tunnel too dangerous but Glenn and Tara proceed. They are surrounded by walkers but saved by Maggie, Sasha, and Bob; the combined group continue to Terminus as a waypoint towards Washington, D.C. They find Terminus and are welcomed with open arms. Daryl is forced to travel with the men that captured him, the same Claimers that Rick encountered and learns that they are on Rick's trail for having killed one of their own.
51	16	"A"	Michelle MacLaren	Scott M. Gimple & Angela Kang	March 30, 2014	15.68
The Claimers catch up to Rick, Carl and Michonne but when they threaten to rape Michonne and Carl, they are slaughtered by Rick and Daryl. The four continue towards Terminus but Rick is wary and leaves their weapons hidden before they enter. Inside they are guided by Gareth, who welcomes them. Rick spots gear belonging to the other survivors and demands to know what is going on. Rick's group is forced into a boxcar at gunpoint where they join up with Glenn, Maggie, Sasha, Bob, Tara, Abraham, Eugene and Rosita, all also captives of the Terminus residents. Rick asserts that they have picked the wrong people to mess with.

== Reception ==
=== Critical response ===
The fourth season of The Walking Dead has been well received by critics. On Metacritic, the season holds a score of 75 out of 100, indicating "generally favorable" reviews, based on 16 critics. On Rotten Tomatoes, the season holds an 81% with an average rating of 7.6 out of 10 based on 316 reviews. The site's critical consensus reads: "Consistently thrilling, with solid character development and enough gore to please grindhouse fans, this season of The Walking Dead continues to demonstrate why it's one of the best horror shows on television."

The Walking Dead season 4: Critical reception by episode
Season 4 (2013–14): Percentage of positive critics' reviews tracked by the website Rotten Tomatoes

=== Accolades ===
For the 40th Saturn Awards, the fourth season of The Walking Dead received four nominations and three wins. The wins were for Best Syndicated/Cable Television Series, Best Supporting Actress on Television (Melissa McBride), and Best Performance by a Younger Actor in a Television Series (Chandler Riggs). The only other nomination was for Best Guest Starring Role on Television (David Morrissey).

The season also received two nominations for the 66th Primetime Creative Arts Emmy Awards: Outstanding Sound Editing for a Series ("Too Far Gone") and Outstanding Special Visual Effects in a Supporting Role ("30 Days Without an Accident"). Additionally, the season was also nominated for Outstanding Performance by a Stunt Ensemble in a Television Series at the 20th and 21st Screen Actors Guild Awards for both halves of the season, respectively. Melissa McBride was nominated for Best Supporting Actress in a Drama Series at the 4th Critics' Choice Television Awards.

=== Ratings ===
Viewership and ratings per episode of The Walking Dead season 4
No.	Title	Air date	Rating (18–49)	Viewers (millions)
1	"30 Days Without an Accident"	October 13, 2013	8.2	16.11
2	"Infected"	October 20, 2013	7.1	13.95
3	"Isolation"	October 27, 2013	6.8	12.92
4	"Indifference"	November 3, 2013	6.8	13.31
5	"Internment"	November 10, 2013	6.2	12.20
6	"Live Bait"	November 17, 2013	6.0	12.00
7	"Dead Weight"	November 24, 2013	5.7	11.29
8	"Too Far Gone"	December 1, 2013	6.1	12.05
9	"After"	February 9, 2014	8.2	15.76
10	"Inmates"	February 16, 2014	6.8	13.34
11	"Claimed"	February 23, 2014	6.6	13.12
12	"Still"	March 2, 2014	6.4	12.61
13	"Alone"	March 9, 2014	6.3	12.65
14	"The Grove"	March 16, 2014	6.4	12.87
15	"Us"	March 23, 2014	6.7	13.47
16	"A"	March 30, 2014	8.0	15.68

== Home media releases ==
The fourth season was released on region 1/A DVD and Blu-ray on August 26, 2014. It was also released in limited edition Blu-ray packaging, a replica of the tree walker (featured in the episode "Isolation"), designed by Greg Nicotero and sculpted by McFarlane Toys. Special features include "Inside The Walking Dead" and "The Making of The Walking Dead" featurettes for every episode; six other featurettes titled, "Drawing Inspiration", "Hershel", "The Governor is Back", "Society, Science & Survival", "Inside KNB Studios" and "A Journey Back to Brutality"; deleted scenes from eight episodes; and audio commentaries on six episodes; and two extended episodes. Also, the final line of the season is uncensored, with Rick saying "They're fucking with the wrong people". This uncensored line change was added to the finale itself, unlike similar changes in the future taking the space of a secondary version of the episode inside bonus features.
