= Us (The Walking Dead) =

- The Walking Dead episode
- Glenn and Maggie reunite.
- Episode no.: Season 4 Episode 15
- Directed by: Greg Nicotero
- Written by: Nichole Beattie; Seth Hoffman
- Cinematography by: Michael E. Satrazemis
- Editing by: Avi Youabian
- Original air date: March 23, 2014

Guest appearances
- Michael Cudlitz as Abraham Ford; Josh McDermitt as Eugene Porter; Christian Serratos as Rosita Espinosa; Jeff Kober as Joe; Alanna Masterson as Tara Chambler; Denise Crosby as Mary; Keith Brooks as Dan; J. D. Evermore as Harley; Marcus Hester as Len; Davi Jay as Tony; Eric Mendenhall as Billy

Episode chronology
← Previous "The Grove"	Next → "A"
- The Walking Dead season 4

"Us" is the fifteenth and penultimate episode of the fourth season, and 50th episode overall of the post-apocalyptic horror television series The Walking Dead, which aired on AMC on March 23, 2014. The episode was written by Nichole Beattie and Seth Hoffman, and directed by Greg Nicotero.

Glenn Rhee and Tara Chambler part ways from Abraham, Rosita and Eugene to go to Terminus, instead of going to Washington, D.C., in hopes of a cure. Glenn and Tara struggle on the way to Terminus, with their main objective to find Glenn's wife, Maggie Greene. Meanwhile, after Beth's mysterious disappearance, Daryl Dixon now has joined the group of Claimers led by Joe (Jeff Kober) but is at odds with some of its members.

The episode received very positive reviews, with many praising its simplicity and lighter tone, compared to the previous episode. It was also praised for its ending, which features the first appearance of Terminus, as well as the reunion between Glenn and Maggie.

== Plot ==
Glenn, Tara, Abraham, Rosita, and Eugene follow railroad tracks, while elsewhere Rick, Carl, and Michonne are also following the tracks toward Terminus, sharing a candy bar between them. Glenn's group comes across another sign pointing the way to Terminus, and Glenn discovers a note left by Maggie to him, telling him to travel to Terminus. They continue on, passing a small town, where Eugene is almost hit by a falling walker corpse falling from a roof before Abraham pushes him out of the way; the incident causes Tara to injure her foot. Abraham argues it is too dangerous to cover for Eugene, but Glenn allows them to use his riot suit to help protect Eugene if Abraham will continue on with them. Abraham agrees, and they find a usable vehicle and some supplies to continue.

They come to a train tunnel, and Glenn sees another note from Maggie. He insists they need to go through the tunnel, but Abraham will not risk Eugene's life as there are sounds of walkers from within it, and decides it is time to part ways. He provides Glenn and Tara some supplies and flashlights, and tells them to retreat to the road if they get stuck, before they drive off. In the tunnel, Tara apologizes to Glenn, believing her actions in trusting The Governor led to the death of many of Glenn's friends, including Hershel, Maggie's father. Glenn accepts her apology. They are eventually set on by walkers, and Tara's injury slows them down and they appear trapped when suddenly Maggie, Sasha, and Bob appear from the opposite end of the tunnel, along with Abraham, Eugene, and Rosita. They clear out the walkers to allow Glenn and Tara to escape. Glenn and Maggie have a tearful reunion, and then proper introductions are made. Tara keeps quiet about her role in Maggie's father's death. While Abraham insists they continue to Washington D.C., the collective group, including Eugene, agree they should finish the trip to Terminus, as their friends may also be there. The merged group finally reach Terminus, a secured trainyard, and enter with ease. A woman named Mary (Denise Crosby) welcomes them and offers them some meat.

Meanwhile, Daryl has been forced to travel with the Claimers, led by Joe. Daryl gets into a confrontation with Len over a claim on who shot, and thus owns, a rabbit, and Joe informs Daryl of the rules, then splits the rabbit's meat between them. At a resting site in a warehouse Len accuses Daryl of stealing the other half of the rabbit. Joe, however, reports he saw Len put the half-rabbit in Daryl's bag, and knocks Len down, before letting his gang brutally beat Len on the ground as punishment for his lies and false framing towards Daryl. The next morning, he sees Len's dead body outside, an arrow struck through his head. They come across the train tracks and walk over the candy wrapper left behind by Rick's group.

== Production ==
"Us" was co-written by supervising producer Nichole Beattie and co-executive producer Seth Hoffman; for each, it is their third writing credit for the season and their second shared writing credit, after co-writing the earlier season episode "Claimed". "Us" was directed by executive producer and special effects makeup artist Greg Nicotero, his third directing credit for the season. It was initially reported in July 2013 that David S. Goyer would be directing this episode; however, scheduling conflicts arose.

The majority of the main cast appears in this episode with the exceptions of Melissa McBride (Carol Peletier), Emily Kinney (Beth Greene), and Chad L. Coleman (Tyreese).

The song playing at the end of the episode is "Be Not So Fearful", by A.C. Newman, a cover of a Bill Fay original. The cover can be found on the soundtrack album, The Walking Dead Original Soundtrack — Volume 2.

== Reception ==
=== Viewership ===
Upon airing, the episode was watched by 13.47 million American viewers, and received an 18–49 rating of 6.7. This marks a rise in total viewers and ratings from the previous episode, which received an 18–49 rating of 6.4 and 12.87 million viewers.

=== Critical reception ===
The episode received generally positive reviews from critics. Roth Cornet of IGN gave the episode an 8 out of 10, saying "The Walking Dead took a moment to remind us that there is – figuratively and literally – a light at the end of the tunnel after last week’s grim events. The intention seems to be to present us with the notion that there is, perhaps, such a thing as a happy ending just as we head into the season closer. The bright and shiny Stepford Wives feel of Terminus may be bit manufactured, but we won’t really know if this was the set up for a sucker-punch until we see the events of next week’s “A” play out."

Erik Kain of Forbes also gave the episode a positive review, noting mainly the episode's bringing the characters together, saying: "Rather than focus on just one group, Sunday night’s episode gives us a glimpse at almost every survivor we’ve tracked this season. While we only get a brief glimpse at Rick, Michonne, and Carl, we at least see them making their way—in high spirits—toward their goal. It’s not all sunshine and roses, but it’s a much happier episode than the death of two girls—once again closely tied to Carol—we were served last week."

Some critics commented on the episode's simplicity compared to the previous episode. Margaret Ely of The Washington Post commented on the episode's simplicity and even storytelling, saying: "Since we’re all still processing last week’s emotionally draining episode, it was nice of 'The Walking Dead' to give us a relatively easy-to-digest 60 minutes of television on Sunday. From a romantic reunion to entertainingly awkward comments from the eccentric Dr. Eugene Porter, it had a little bit of everything." Patrick Kevin Day of the Los Angeles Times said: "After last week's heart-rending episode, the producers of 'The Walking Dead' took things easy on the audience with the episode 'Us.' No major plot twists this week, no shocking revelations and the only recurring character death was no one we'll mourn. Essentially, this was a breather before the season finale next week."

Andrew Conrad of The Baltimore Sun gave the episode a more mixed review, saying: "My bold prediction after last week's controversial episode of 'The Walking Dead' was that this week's would slow things way down in preparation for the grand Season 4 finale next Sunday evening. Well, this week's episode, titled 'Us,' was not exactly slow, but I doubt it will draw the crowds to the water cooler this morning either. There was plenty to keep our attention, but not quite enough to demand it."
