= The Last Pale Light in the West =

Studio album by Ben Nichols
- Released: January 20, 2009
- Genre: Alt. Country
- Label: Liberty & Lament

Professional ratings
Review scores
Source	Rating
Slant Magazine	3.5/5 stars

The Last Pale Light in the West is the first solo album by Ben Nichols of Lucero with Rick Steff (Lucero, Cat Power) and Todd Beene (Glossary) released on Lucero's label Liberty & Lament and The Rebel Group in 2009. It is a seven-song concept album inspired by Cormac McCarthy's book Blood Meridian with each song based on characters and situations drawn from the novel. The album was recorded with Rick Steff on piano and accordion and Todd Beane on pedal steel.

On November 17, 2013, the title song from the album was featured in the episode "Live Bait" of the AMC series The Walking Dead.

== Track listing ==
1. "The Last Pale Light in the West" - 2:48
2. "The Kid" - 5:32
3. "Davy Brown" - 3:21
4. "Chambers" - 4:45
5. "Tobin" - 3:06
6. "Toadvine" - 4:31
7. "The Judge" - 2:57
