= Live Bait (The Walking Dead) =

- The Walking Dead episode
- The Governor, after burning down his entire town after it is overrun by walkers.
- Episode no.: Season 4 Episode 6
- Directed by: Michael Uppendahl
- Written by: Nichole Beattie
- Cinematography by: Michael Satrazemis
- Editing by: Kelley Dixon
- Original air date: November 17, 2013

Guest appearances
- Audrey Marie Anderson as Lilly Chambler; Jose Pablo Cantillo as Caesar Martinez; Alanna Masterson as Tara Chambler; Meyrick Murphy as Meghan Chambler; Danny Vinson as David Chambler; Travis Love as Shumpert; Daniel Thomas May as Allen

Episode chronology
← Previous "Internment"	Next → "Dead Weight"
- The Walking Dead season 4

"Live Bait" (previously titled "Rise") is the sixth episode of the fourth season of the post-apocalyptic horror television series The Walking Dead, which aired on AMC on November 17, 2013. The episode was written by Nichole Beattie and directed by Michael Uppendahl.

The episode centers on The Governor (David Morrissey), who has isolated himself from society after killing his entire army. He has become an aimless wanderer until he meets a small family of survivors. The episode also loosely adapts Issue #43 of the comics.

This episode marks the first appearance of Alanna Masterson (Tara Chambler).

== Plot ==
In a flashback, The Governor becomes indifferent and somewhat catatonic following his massacre of the Woodbury army. Afraid of what he might do, his henchmen Caesar Martinez and Shumpert abandon him while he is asleep. He returns to the abandoned Woodbury and smashes through its walls. His former town is then overrun by walkers and he burns the entire settlement to the ground, before proceeding to aimlessly wander the countryside alone.

A few months later, the bearded and weakened Governor sees a young girl, who resembles his deceased daughter Penny, in the window of a nearby apartment building. Inside the building, he meets the Chambler family residing there: Lilly (Audrey Marie Anderson) and Tara (Alanna Masterson), the sisters' father David (Danny Vinson), and Lilly's daughter Meghan (Meyrick Murphy), the girl The Governor had seen earlier. The family has sufficient food and arms, and they are waiting for the National Guard. After explaining that he would only stay for the night, he fabricates a false story involving the fall of Woodbury and a new identity, "Brian Heriot", a name he saw painted on a barn. David then requests that The Governor retrieve a backgammon set from a neighbor, which The Governor does. Despite having shot walkers, the family still don't know how to kill one, and are unaware the un-bitten/un-scratched dead will reanimate.

The next morning, Lilly asks The Governor for one last favor before he leaves: her father is dying of stage four lung cancer and requires oxygen tanks from a nearby old folks' home. The Governor manages to retrieve two tanks from the nursing home, following an encounter with walkers. The family begins to warm up to The Governor, who has bonded with Meghan. When The Governor and Meghan are playing chess, Lilly approaches The Governor and tells him that David has died from his illness. When David reanimates and attacks Tara, The Governor bashes David's head in with one of the oxygen tanks. Meghan begins to avoid The Governor, but Tara and Lilly eventually understand him for this act.

After The Governor buries David, he burns the photo of his wife and daughter, hoping to finally erase his old, cruel persona. He then comforts Meghan about her grandfather's death. As he prepares for his departure, he approaches the Chamblers to say goodbye, but Lilly insists that he stay, for he has become a part of their family. The group then leave the apartment in their food truck, hoping to find a safe haven in their journey. The Governor and Lilly become intimate during an overnight encounter. When their truck breaks down, the family is forced to walk on foot; however, they must flee when they encounter a herd of walkers. The Governor and Meghan are separated from Lilly and Tara (who has a damaged ankle) and fall in a pit filled with walkers, which are killed by The Governor. He assures Meghan that he will let nothing harm her, and looks up the pit to see a shocked Martinez.

== Production ==
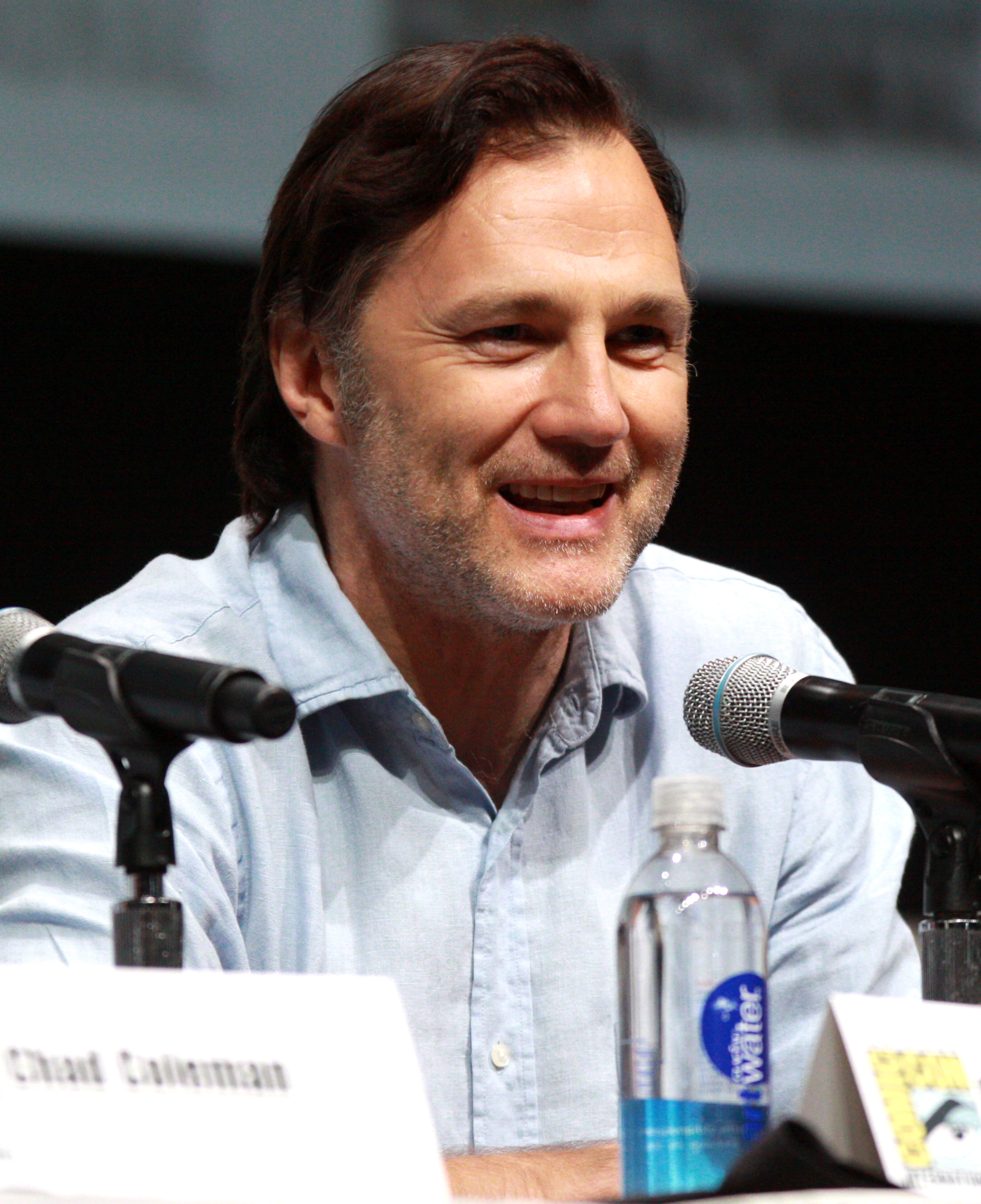
The episode prominently features David Morrissey (pictured in 2013) as The Governor.

This is the first episode in the entire series to feature only one series regular – in this case, David Morrissey (The Governor). In addition, it is the second episode in the entire series not to feature Andrew Lincoln (Rick). Norman Reedus (Daryl), Steven Yeun (Glenn), Lauren Cohan (Maggie), Chandler Riggs (Carl), Danai Gurira (Michonne), Melissa McBride (Carol), and Scott Wilson (Hershel) are also absent. Despite this, they are all featured in the opening credits. Emily Kinney (Beth), Chad L. Coleman (Tyreese), Sonequa Martin-Green (Sasha), and Lawrence Gilliard Jr. (Bob) are also absent but are credited as "also starring".

The opening scene features the title song from the country music concept album The Last Pale Light in the West, by Ben Nichols of Lucero.

== Reception ==
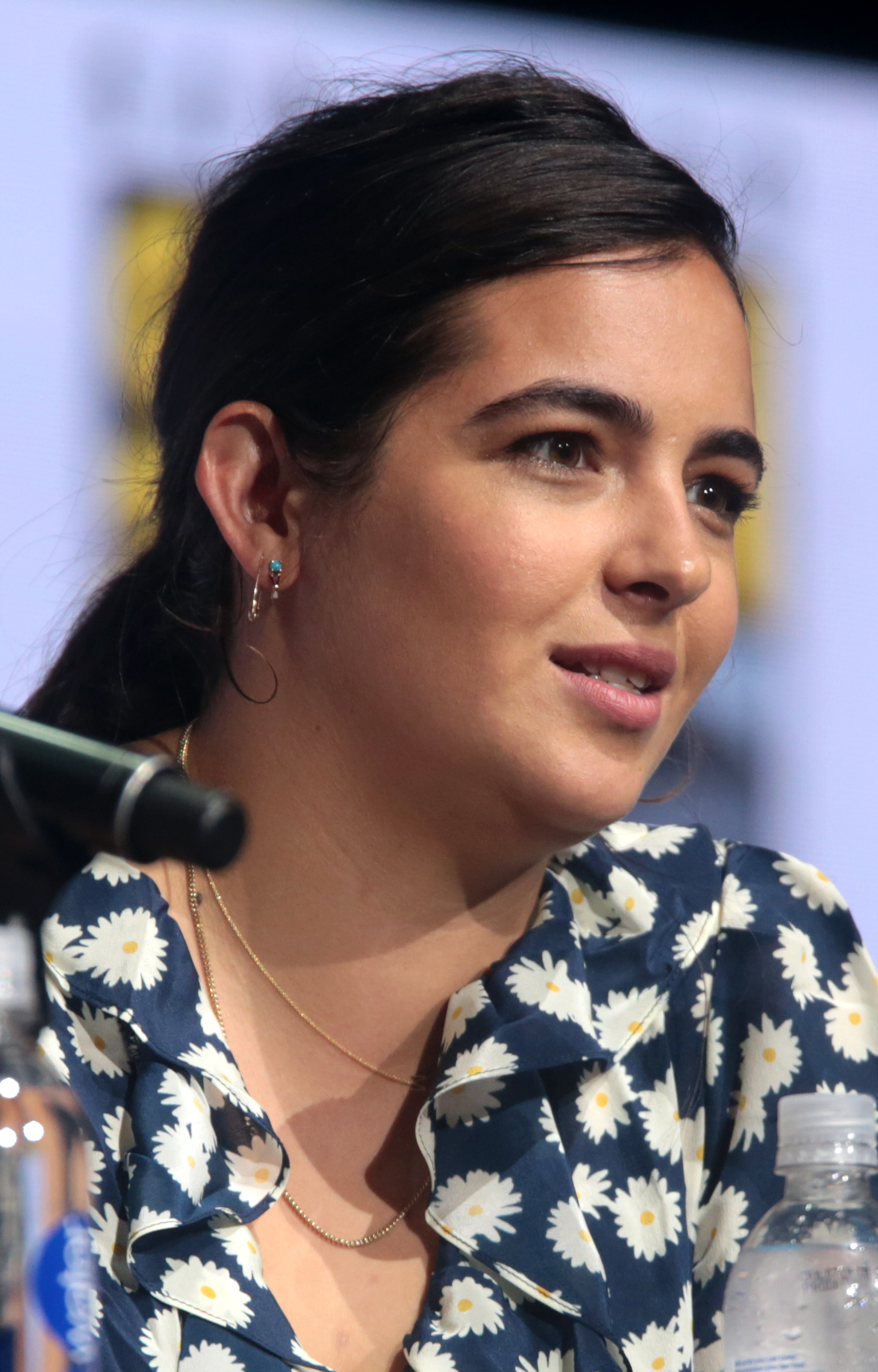
Alanna Masterson (pictured in 2017) made her first appearance as Tara Chambler.

=== Ratings ===
Upon its original airing, "Live Bait" earned 12.003 million viewers and a 6.0 rating in the adults 18–49 demographic. This was down from last week's 12.20 million viewers, and down 0.2 share from last week's 18–49 demographic rating.

=== Critical response ===
The episode received positive reviews from critics. TV Fanatic's Sean McKenna rated the episode 3.3 out of 5; positive comments by McKenna focused on The Governor's humanity in his new situation, while negative comments were directed at the lack of action until the end of the episode. IGN's Roth Cornet gave the episode an 8.3 out of 10 and praised David Morrissey's performance as The Governor, the mix of action and story, and the dreamlike quality of the episode; however, Cornet was conflicted about the turn in The Governor's character. The A.V. Club's Zack Handlen gave a mixed review scoring it a "B−" grade, saying "nearly every dramatic moment in the episode falls flat...it's different, but I'm not sure that's enough".
