= Dead Weight (The Walking Dead) =

- The Walking Dead episode
- Caesar speaks with The Governor, now reunited.
- Episode no.: Season 4 Episode 7
- Directed by: Jeremy Podeswa
- Written by: Curtis Gwinn
- Cinematography by: Michael Satrazemis
- Editing by: Julius Ramsay
- Original air date: November 24, 2013

Guest appearances
- Audrey Marie Anderson as Lilly Chambler; Jose Pablo Cantillo as Caesar Martinez; Kirk Acevedo as Mitch Dolgen; Enver Gjokaj as Pete Dolgen; Alanna Masterson as Tara Chambler; Meyrick Murphy as Meghan Chambler; Juliana Harkavy as Alisha; Amy Dionne as Woman #1; Tom Turbiville as Guy #1

Episode chronology
← Previous "Live Bait"	Next → "Too Far Gone"
- The Walking Dead season 4

"Dead Weight" is the seventh episode of the fourth season of the post-apocalyptic horror television series The Walking Dead, which aired on AMC on November 24, 2013. The episode was written by Curtis Gwinn and directed by Jeremy Podeswa.

The episode focuses on the nature of The Governor's (David Morrissey) survival instinct conflicted against the morality of the actions that he takes in order to survive in his new camp of operations. The episode also loosely continued adapting Issue #43 of the comics.

== Plot ==
Martinez and brothers Mitch (Kirk Acevedo) and Pete Dolgen (Enver Gjokaj) rescue The Governor and Meghan from a pit of walkers. After reuniting with Lilly and Tara, The Governor joins the camp of Martinez, who appears surprised by The Governor's decision to adopt a new identity.

The Governor, Martinez, Mitch, and Pete go on a supply run to a nearby cabin, on the way to which they find three dead bodies labeled "Liar", "Rapist", and "Murderer". While resting in the cabin, Martinez tells The Governor that he wouldn't have saved him if The Governor weren't with his adopted family, which Martinez believes indicates that The Governor has changed from his old cruel ways. When they return to camp, Martinez invites The Governor to play golf atop a trailer, where Martinez reveals that Shumpert, one of The Governor's former henchmen, became reckless and was bitten near one of the walker pits; Martinez then mercy-killed him. A drunk Martinez shares his insecurities about keeping the camp safe, and he offers The Governor a co-leadership role. In response, The Governor strikes Martinez's head with his golf club, throws him off the trailer, and drags him to a pit of walkers, where Martinez is devoured. The Governor repeatedly mutters, "I don't want it".

Pete and Mitch announce Martinez's death to the camp, attributing it to drunken carelessness, and Pete declares himself temporary leader. Pete, Mitch, and The Governor then go on a hunt and find another camp. Mitch wants to raid the camp and take their supplies, while Pete opts to find supplies elsewhere. The three later return to find the occupants of the camp killed and the place raided. Mitch is frustrated that "their" supplies were taken by others. Upon returning to his trailer, The Governor tells Lilly that they must leave, since he deems Martinez's camp unsafe. He, Lilly, Meghan, Tara, and Tara's girlfriend Alisha (Juliana Harkavy) depart at night in a motor car, but they turn back when their path is blocked by a sizeable group of walkers mired in mud in the road.

The next day, The Governor kills Pete in Pete's trailer and forces Mitch to join him, declaring that The Governor is now leader of the camp. The Governor then drags Pete's weighted corpse along a jetty and throws it into a lake. Later, he organizes the survivors to form a rough perimeter around the camp and asks Tara to organize and catalog all their ammo. Despite Lilly's insistence that the camp is safe, The Governor believes they need to move to a more secure location. During a game of tag, a walker who has entered the camp attacks Meghan and Tara, but The Governor quickly kills it. Concluding that the prison is a safe place for his family, The Governor scouts the prison and observes Rick and his son Carl digging in the prison yard. He looks away and notices Hershel and a smiling Michonne burning walker corpses. Angered, he aims his pistol at them.

== Production ==
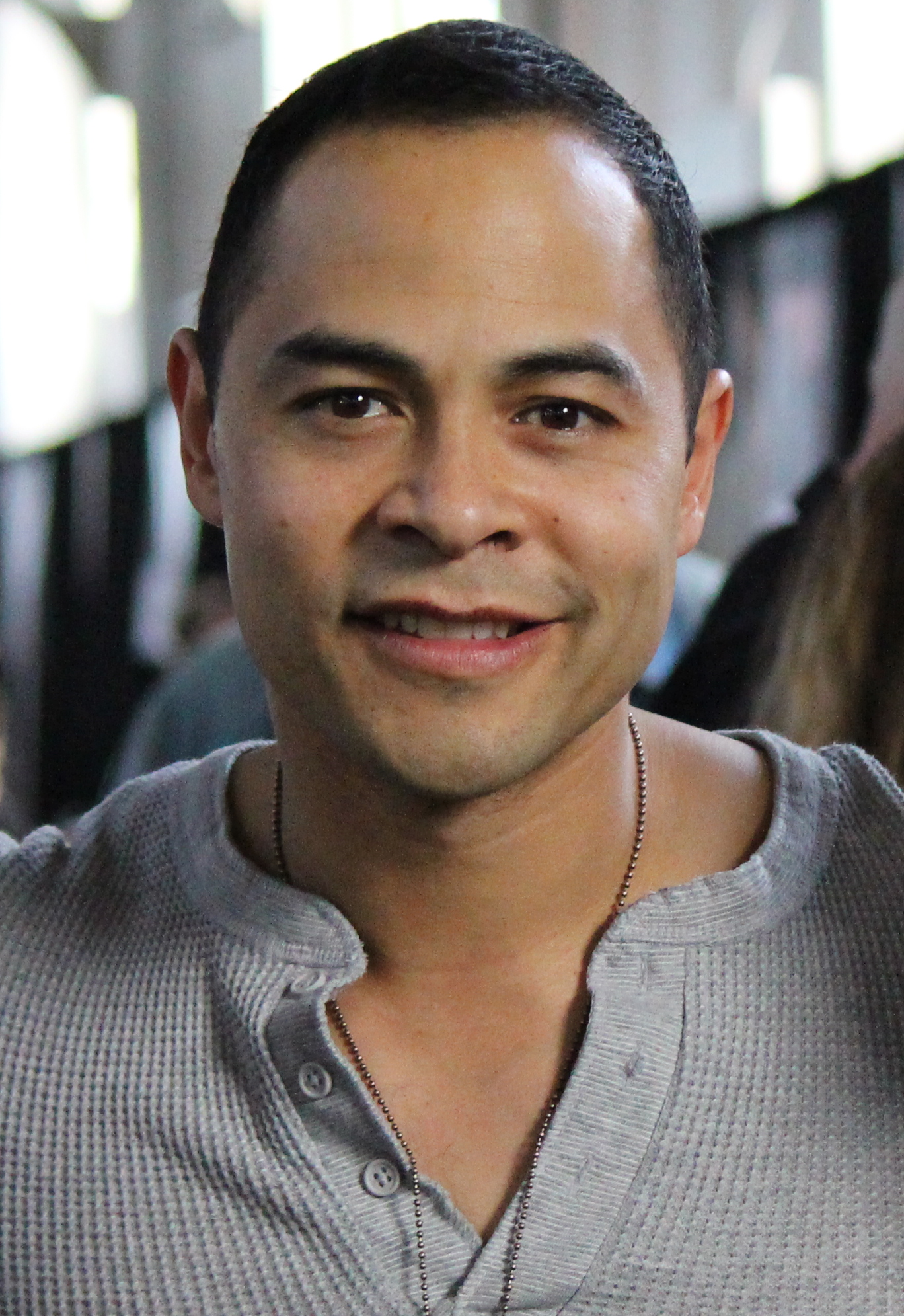
The episode marks the final appearance of Jose Pablo Cantillo (pictured in 2015) as Caesar Martinez.

This episode marks the last appearance of recurring actor Jose Pablo Cantillo (Martinez), whom The Governor (David Morrissey) kills in the episode. On The Governor's reasoning for killing Martinez, Morrissey explains:

I think Martinez makes the mistake of admitting weakness. He says to the Governor, “I’m not sure I can keep this place safe.” Had he turned around to the Governor on that day where he was playing golf and said, “There is no way this camp is not going to be safe. I’m going to make it safe. I’m going to do everything I can to make it safe,” then the Governor is going to say, “Great, I’ll follow you.” But as soon as the man admits weakness, then the Governor is going to take control. And the Governor is killing him and screaming, “I don’t want it!” What he doesn’t want is the responsibility. He doesn’t want the responsibility he is forced to take because of this man’s weakness. That’s very important. He’s putting a crown on his head that he doesn’t want. But nobody else but him is worthy of wearing it.

== Reception ==
=== Ratings ===
Upon its original airing, "Dead Weight" garnered 11.293 million viewers and a 5.7 rating in the adults 18-49 demographic. This was down from last week's 12.003 million viewers, and down 0.3 share from last week's 18-49 demographic rating.

=== Critical ===
TV Fanatic's Sean McKenna rated the episode 2.9 out of a possible 5; McKenna expressed frustration over The Governor's easily condensable storyline's placing the main story of the prison-based survivors on hold and questioned how long the characters will survive under The Governor's watch. IGN's Roth Cornet rated the episode 8.5 out of a possible 10; Cornet praised David Morrissey's performance as The Governor, the concept of failed redemption as a storyline, and the storytelling techniques; she was critical of the lack of subtlety, the reliance on coincidence, and the rushed feeling of The Governor's storyline. The A.V. Club's Zack Handlen rated the episode a B+; Handlen praised the execution of The Governor's philosophy as a calculating individual bent on survival but questioned the need to spend two episodes, noting that "Dead Weight had sluggish spots" and the previous episode's build up "wasn’t entirely justified by the results."
