= Danny Vinson =

American character actor (born 1954)

- Born: Huntsville, Alabama, U.S.
- Occupation: Actor

Danny Vinson (born in Huntsville, Alabama) is an American character actor.

== Filmography ==
=== Film ===
| Year | Title | Role | Notes |
|---|---|---|---|
| 1997 | The Sore Losers | Hippie Partyer | |
| 2000 | A Good Baby | Cal | |
| 2002 | Cultivision (Collapsing Stars) | Belmont Ragoni | |
| 2005 | Our Very Own | Clay | |
| 2005 | Walk the Line | Texarkana MC | |
| 2006 | When I Find the Ocean | Dean's Father | |
| 2006 | False Prophets | Ministry Man #2 | |
| 2006 | Talladega Nights: The Ballad of Ricky Bobby | Texas Ticket Seller | |
| 2007 | The List | Tow Truck Driver | |
| 2007 | Blood Ties | Randall | |
| 2007 | Honeydripper | Judge Gatlin | |
| 2007 | A Dance for Bethany | Matthew Carrothers | |
| 2008 | Leatherheads | Duluth Reporter | |
| 2008 | The Curious Case of Benjamin Button | Priest Giving Last Rites | |
| 2009 | Cigarette Girl | Cowboy | |
| 2009 | Get Low | Grier | |
| 2010 | Blood Done Sign My Name | Dick Jones | |
| 2010 | Lifted | Mr. Shelton | |
| 2010 | The Trial | Rodney MacFarland | |
| 2012 | Hell and Mr. Fudge | Matt Harper | |
| 2012 | The Campaign | Elder Dan | |
| 2012 | Little Red Wagon | State Senator | |
| 2012 | Company M: A Mob of Soldiers | Militia Man | |
| 2013 | 42 | Eddie Dyer | |
| 2013 | Space Warriors | NASA Exec #1 | |
| 2013 | Jimmy | Alfred Walker | |
| 2014 | Online | Stark | |
| 2014 | The Song | Shep Jordan | |
| 2014 | Dropped | Martin | |
| 2015 | A Walk in the Woods | Georgia Cab Driver | |
| 2015 | The Longest Ride | Larry Till | |
| 2015 | Christmas in the Smokies | DJ Baley | |
| 2015 | Woodlawn | Banks Asst. Coach | |
| 2015 | Love N Success | Producer | |
| 2015 | Badge of Faith | Johan | |
| 2016 | The Birth of a Nation | Benjamin S. Turner | |
| 2016 | Josephine | Old Soldier | |
| 2016 | Savannah Sunrise | Little Doug | |
| 2017 | Novitiate | Rob - Church Usher | |
| 2017 | Mountain Top | Braxton Hodges | |
| 2017 | Drowning | Lt. David Greyson | |
| 2017 | Heaven Bound | Doc | |
| 2017 | Diary of a Wimpy Kid: The Long Haul | Hog Man | |
| 2017 | County Line | Skooter | |
| 2017 | Cowboy Drifter | Scraggly Man | |
| 2018 | Education in Love | Danny Houston | |
| 2019 | The Legend of 5 Mile Cave | Sheriff Bean | |
| 2019 | Greener | Theo Knox | |
| 2020 | Blue Ridge | Harvey Harrison | |
| 2021 | Howard's Mill | Detective Dan Thompson | |
| 2021 | American Underdog | Larry | |

=== Television ===
| Year | Title | Role | Notes |
|---|---|---|---|
| 2009 | Eastbound & Down | Alan Hicks | Episode: "Chapter 3" |
| 2009, 2010 | Army Wives | Agent Chapman | 2 episodes |
| 2010 | The Wronged Man | Graves Thomas | Television film |
| 2013 | The Walking Dead | David | Episode: "Live Bait" |
| 2013, 2016 | Nashville | AA Speaker | 2 episodes |
| 2015 | The Astronaut Wives Club | Dr. Glennan | Episode: "Launch" |
| 2016 | The Vampire Diaries | Colonel | Episode: "Hell Is Other People" |
| 2016 | Stay | Cotton Brewer | 3 episodes |
| 2016 | NASCAR: The Rise of American Speed | Older Bill France | 3 episodes |
| 2016 | Atlanta | Farmer | Episode: "The Streisand Effect" |
| 2017 | Hap and Leonard | State Prosecutor | Episode: "Ticking Mojo" |
| 2017 | Mr. Mercedes | Bud Schulberg | Episode: "People in the Rain" |
| 2018 | Behind the Movement | James Blake | Television film |
| 2018 | Preacher | Missouri Cowboy | Episode: "The Coffin" |
| 2018–2019 | Lodge 49 | Don Fab | 4 episodes |
| 2019 | The Purge | Farmer | Episode: "Blindspots" |
| 2022 | The Righteous Gemstones | Tim Nesbitt | Episode: "After I Leave, Savage Wolves Will Come" |
| 2022 | Women of the Movement | Hold Out Juror | 3 episodes |
