= Claimed =

- The Walking Dead episode
- Rick strangles a Claimer to enable his own escape.
- Episode no.: Season 4 Episode 11
- Directed by: Seith Mann
- Written by: Nichole Beattie; Seth Hoffman
- Cinematography by: Stephen Campbell
- Editing by: Kelley Dixon
- Original air date: February 23, 2014

Guest appearances
- Alanna Masterson as Tara Chambler; Michael Cudlitz as Abraham Ford; Josh McDermitt as Eugene Porter; Christian Serratos as Rosita Espinosa; Jeff Kober as Joe; Marcus Hester as Len; Davi Jay as Tony

Episode chronology
← Previous "Inmates"	Next → "Still"
- The Walking Dead season 4

"Claimed" is the eleventh episode of the fourth season of the post-apocalyptic horror television series The Walking Dead, which aired on AMC on February 23, 2014. The episode was written by Nichole Beattie and Seth Hoffman, and directed by Seith Mann.

Glenn Rhee (Steven Yeun) and Tara Chambler (Alanna Masterson) interact with three new survivors headed for Washington, D.C., while Rick (Andrew Lincoln) deals with a group of marauders and Carl (Chandler Riggs) learns more about Michonne (Danai Gurira).

== Plot ==
In wake of their escape from the walker-overrun prison, Tara and Glenn are picked up by Abraham, Rosita, and Eugene in their military vehicle as they drive north.

Meanwhile, Rick, Michonne, and Carl, having regrouped in an abandoned home, are eating breakfast, when Michonne makes a comment about soy milk for their cereal; Carl replies he would rather have baby formula than soy milk, causing him to recall the apparent loss of his newborn sister Judith, and he leaves the table. Rick thanks Michonne for trying to help and being a friend to Carl. Later, Carl and Michonne decide to go on a supply run; Rick tries to come but Michonne orders him to get some rest to recover from his injuries. Rick goes to bed in an upstairs bedroom as they leave. Michonne and Carl bond more during their run, with Carl learning about Michonne's son Andre that she had lost in the apocalypse. In one house they come across a children's room where the family appeared to have committed suicide together. Recalling her son and her sad memories, Michonne blocks Carl from entering the room. Carl opens up about naming Judith, and offers that Judith and Andre are "somewhere" together.

Recovering in the back of the military vehicle, Glenn insists that Abraham stop so that they can look for Maggie and other survivors from the prison. Abraham refuses, stating that he and Rosita are on a mission to bring Eugene to Washington D.C., as Eugene, a scientist, says he knows how to stop the walkers once there. Glenn and Abraham argue, drawing a small group of walkers toward them. As they begin to fire on the walkers, Eugene fumbles with his weapon and accidentally shoots the truck's gas tank. With the walkers dealt with, they are forced to abandon the truck. Glenn and Tara head south to continue their search for other survivors from the prison; Abraham, Rosita, and Eugene decide to join them heading south until they are able to find a new vehicle.

Back at the house, Rick is woken by noises in the house, discovering a small band of scavengers are inside. He hides under the bed as one, Tony (Davi Jay), takes a nap on it. Another scavenger, Len (Marcus Hester), demands Tony give up the bed, having no claim to it. The two fight, during which Tony spots Rick under the bed. Before Tony can issue a warning, Len chokes him unconscious before getting into bed and falling asleep. Rick sneaks out from under the bed when the other scavengers shout upon discovering signs of Michonne's freshly washed clothes, believing a woman to be nearby. Rick tries to flee the house but is discovered by another scavenger, Lou, in the bathroom. In order to stay hidden and undetected by the other members of the group, Rick jumps Lou and begins strangling him. Although Lou attempts to grab a pair of scissors on the nearby counter to stab Rick with, Rick ultimately strangles him to death before escaping out the window. Now outside the house, Rick tries to sneak away but his path is blocked by Joe (Jeff Kober), their lookout. As he spots Michonne and Carl returning, Rick is about to make a distraction when shouts are heard from inside, Lou having become a walker. Joe runs back into the house to aid the other scavengers, allowing Rick to escape with Michonne and Carl.

The three continue travelling and encounter a sign near railroad tracks, stating that "sanctuary for all" lies down the way of the tracks.

== Production ==
"Claimed" was co-written by supervising producer Nichole Beattie and co-executive producer Seth Hoffman and directed by Seith Mann.

This episode focuses entirely on the main characters of Rick Grimes (Andrew Lincoln), Carl Grimes (Chandler Riggs), Michonne (Danai Gurira), and Glenn Rhee (Steven Yeun), and features guest appearances by recurring actors Alanna Masterson as Tara Chambler, Michael Cudlitz as Sgt. Abraham Ford, Josh McDermitt as Dr. Eugene Porter, and Christian Serratos as Rosita Espinosa. Norman Reedus (Daryl), Lauren Cohan (Maggie) and Melissa McBride (Carol) are credited but do not appear. Emily Kinney (Beth), Chad L. Coleman (Tyreese), Sonequa Martin-Green (Sasha) and Lawrence Gilliard Jr. (Bob) are also absent but are credited as "also starring".

== Reception ==
Upon airing, the episode was watched by 13.12 million American viewers, receiving an 18-49 rating of 6.6. This presented a slight decrease in ratings from the previous episode, but still presented strong ratings. The show placed first overall in cable television viewing.

Roth Cornet of IGN gave the episode a positive review, with a score of 8.3 out of 10. Zack Handlen of The A.V. Club rated the episode a "B+".
