= Michonne =

Fictional character from The Walking Dead

Michonne Hawthorne
- The Walking Dead character
- From left to right: Michonne, as she appears in the comic book series, television series (portrayed by Danai Gurira) and video game series.
- First appearance: Comic: "Issue #19" (2005); Television: "Beside the Dying Fire" (2012); Video game: "In Too Deep" (2016)
- Last appearance: Comic: "Issue #193" (2019); Television: "The Last Time" (2024); Video game: "What We Deserve"(2016)
- Created by: Robert Kirkman; Charlie Adlard
- Adapted by: Glen Mazzara; Robert Kirkman (The Walking Dead)
- Designed by: Tony Moore (art covers)
- Portrayed by: Danai Gurira
- Voiced by: Samira Wiley (video game); G. K. Bowes (Onslaught)

In-universe information
- Full name: Comic: Michonne Hawthorne; Television: Michonne Grimes
- Occupation: Comic: Private Practice Lawyer (former); Constable for the Alexandria Safe-Zone (former); Soldier for the Militia (former); Fisherwoman at Oceanside (former); Lawyer at the Commonwealth (former); High Court Judge at the Commonwealth (currently); Television: Guard for the Prison (former); Constable for the Alexandria Safe-Zone (former); Soldier for the Militia (former); Member of the Alexandria Council (former); Head of Security and Leader of the Alexandria Safe-Zone (former); Soldier for the Coalition (former); Consignee for the Civic Republic Military (former)
- Affiliation: The Survivors (formerly); Alexandria Safe-Zone (formerly); The Militia (formerly); Comic: Oceanside (formerly); The Commonwealth (currently); Television: The Coalition (currently); Civic Republic Military (formerly)
- Fighting style: Swordsmanship
- Weapon: Katana; Machete (video game)
- Spouses: Comic: Dominic Hawthorne (ex-husband); Television: Rick Grimes (husband)
- Significant others: Mike (late boyfriend); Comic: Tyreese (late boyfriend); Morgan Jones (late lover); King Ezekiel (ex-boyfriend)
- Children: Comic: Colette Hawthorne (daughter); Elodie Hawthorne (daughter); Television: Andre Anthony (son); Carl Grimes (stepson); Judith Grimes (adopted daughter); Rick Grimes Jr. (son); Flame (pet)

Michonne Hawthorne (/mɪˈʃɒn/ mih-SHON) (later Michonne Grimes in the television series) is a fictional character from The Walking Dead. The character also appears in media adaptations of the series, most notably the television series of the same name, in which she is portrayed by Danai Gurira. Armed with a katana and harboring a mysterious past, in both the comic and TV series Michonne has a prominent role in the conflict between the town of Woodbury led by The Governor, and the Prison group.

In the comic book series, Michonne is a former lawyer as well as a divorcée with two missing daughters. Her conflict with The Governor is much more violent in the comics, enduring sexual assault before mutilating him in revenge. Michonne's mental state deteriorates after many losses, bringing her closer to Rick Grimes, who shares similar trauma. At one point, Michonne runs away to Oceanside, and her absence is explored in a 3-episode mini-series by Telltale Games, exploring her departure and living life at sea.

Michonne's backstory is altered in the television series, having lost a three-year-old son named André Anthony. In the television series, Michonne's trauma and guarded nature gradually diminishes as she slowly recovers and finds herself opening up and investing in a community of Rick's core group. Her conflict with The Governor is motivated by his attempt to kill her after leaving the town under suspicion that he is dangerous and trying to protect her friend Andrea. In addition, her relationship with the Grimes family is explored in more depth. She also develops a romance with protagonist Rick Grimes, becoming a mother to his children, Carl and Judith.

The character has been critically praised, often regarded as a fan-favorite in both mediums. Michonne was voted #86 on IGN's Top 100 Comic Book Heroes and Gurira's performance has been well received.

== Appearances ==
=== Comic book series ===
Michonne, as she is first introduced in issue #19 of the comic book series

==== Early storylines (2005–2008) ====
Michonne is introduced as a mysterious woman armed with a katana. She first appears towing two armless, jawless zombies in shackles and causes no small consternation among the group. She saves Otis from zombies and follows him to the abandoned prison where the group is based. She immediately bonds with Tyreese, recognizing him from his days in the NFL, and shares his passion for weightlifting. They sleep together, precipitating Tyreese's breakup with Carol Peletier; Michonne and Tyreese then become a couple.

==== Post-prison (2008–2010) ====
After the events at the prison, she returns to look for the RV survivors and puts Tyreese's reanimated remains to peace. When she finds only footprints, she begins to follow them and stumbles upon Rick and his son, Carl. She saves Carl from a zombie and joins up with Rick and Carl. She bonds with them and keeps Rick's "conversations" with Lori secret. They rejoin other surviving members of the group at Hershel Greene's farm. Michonne travels with the survivors in search of safety, and inquires about Morgan Jones' whereabouts.

==== Alexandria (2010–2012) ====
When the survivors locate the town of Alexandria, a safe haven from the undead, and think they have finally been given an opportunity to rest, Michonne has a difficult time relinquishing her sword, as seen with her confrontation with Alexandria resident Douglas. Another resident, Olivia, persuades Douglas to allow Michonne to keep her weapon. Michonne settles into her new "home" and even hangs her sword above the mantle. She recalls all of the horrific ways she has used it to survive, and finally proclaims, "I am through with you." Michonne begins to let her guard down, and Rick asks Douglas if there is a job for her in the community. Since there is no need for lawyers, Douglas recommends making her a constable to uphold the law in Alexandria.

==== War against Negan (2012–2014) ====
Michonne and Abraham are clearing zombies away from the Alexandria Safe-Zone perimeter when they are surprised by an unknown man, later revealed to be named Paul "Jesus" Monroe. Jesus reveals he has traveled from a community nearby and wishes to establish an alliance between them all. Rick lashes out at Jesus, knocking him unconscious, and Michonne helps in tying him up. Rick, Michonne, and Abraham set out to scout the area for an impending threat, but realize Jesus was telling the truth, and Rick decides to work with him. Rick, Michonne, Jesus, Glenn, Carl and Andrea travel to Jesus' community, the "Hilltop". Along the way, Paul helps the group defeat walkers even with his hands tied, proving his trustworthiness.

==== Disappearance and The Walking Dead: Michonne (2014–2016) ====
After the war, there is a time-skip. Michonne is not seen for a long period of time. Rick states that he still misses her "even after all this time." Michonne's disappearance is explained in the video game.

==== Final issue (2019) ====
Michonne's last appearance comes in the final issue of the comic series, decades after the tragic murder of Rick. By this point, societies around the world have been restored significantly and walkers are now the oddity rather than the majority. An adult Carl is tried before Michonne, now a High Court judge in the Commonwealth, for the crime of killing walkers Hershel Rhee kept as a travelling show feature, as they are now viewed as property. Michonne determines Carl not guilty, ensuring a peaceful resolution for Carl and his family.

=== Television series ===
==== Season 2 ====
Michonne makes her first appearance as a hooded figure near the end of the second-season finale, "Beside the Dying Fire" (though at the time Danai Gurira had not been cast for this role), wherein she saves Andrea from a walker by decapitating it with her katana, which features a triquetra on the inner crossguard. As in the comics, she is accompanied by two chained walkers, side by side with their arms and lower jaws removed to prevent them from attacking. In removing their ability to eat, Michonne effectively tamed these walkers. Michonne has demonstrated economic uses for her pet walkers, such as using them as human pack mules by loading supplies onto their backs as well as a camouflage/repellent, as their presence and scent fools other walkers into thinking those accompanying them are also walkers.

==== Season 3 ====
In the episode "Walk with Me", Michonne and Andrea are taken by a group led by Merle Dixon (Michael Rooker) from a nearby town called Woodbury, run by the Governor (David Morrissey). Andrea, having been severely ill after spending eight months on the road, embraces the town's sense of community which Michonne resists, suspicious of The Governor and his leadership.

In the episode "Say the Word", Michonne ultimately decides to leave alone after failing to convince Andrea to leave. In the episode "Hounded", Michonne's suspicions of The Governor's true nature prove to be true as Merle and his men go after her under the orders of killing her. However, Michonne kills two of Merle's men and escapes. She then spies Maggie (Lauren Cohan) and Glenn (Steven Yeun) on a supply run in a nearby town and overhears directions to the prison where they are staying, but Michonne is not able to make contact with them as they are ambushed and kidnapped by Merle. A wounded and weakened Michonne soon arrives at the prison with Maggie and Glenn's basket of infant supplies. In the episode "When the Dead Come Knocking", Michonne is brought into the prison, albeit cautiously, by Carl (Chandler Riggs) and Rick (Andrew Lincoln), who directs Hershel (Scott Wilson) to tend to her wounds. Michonne informs them of Glenn and Maggie's abduction by Merle, of the Governor, and of Woodbury.

During a mission to rescue Glenn and Maggie with the prison group, in the mid-season finale "Made to Suffer", Michonne finds the Governor's zombie daughter, Penny, whom she kills despite his pleas not to. During a hand-to-hand fight, she stabs him in the eye, causing him to lose it. Andrea's arrival and intervention at gunpoint prevents Michonne from killing the Governor.

In the episode "Clear", Rick has her join him and Carl on a weapons run to Rick's hometown, where she bonds with the two and eventually earns their trust. She confides in him about his hallucinations and tells him she used to speak to her dead boyfriend.

==== Season 4 ====
In the season premiere "30 Days Without an Accident", Michonne comes back to the prison from her tireless search for the Governor which has proved unsuccessful. By this point, Michonne seems to have dropped her guard significantly while staying at the prison, as she is shown joking with Rick and Carl. In the episode "Infected", Michonne is about to head back out on her search, but tries to get back in when a walker attack is announced and she injures her ankle. Beth (Emily Kinney) tends to her wounds, and asks her to watch Rick's baby Judith; when Beth leaves the room, Michonne breaks down crying as she cradles the baby. In the episode "Dead Weight", Michonne and Hershel are taken as hostages by The Governor. In the mid-season finale "Too Far Gone", The Governor ultimately decapitates Hershel with Michonne's katana. Rick's group opens fire, and Michonne rolls away and unties herself. The Governor orders his group to kill everyone at the prison, and they attack, breaking down the fences with their vehicles. When the Governor is punching Rick in the face, Michonne impales him through the chest with her katana killing him and escapes as the prison is overwhelmed by walkers drawn by the noise. In all of the confusion, the surviving members of the group have become separated from each other.

In the mid-season premiere "After", Michonne takes two new walker pets and travels through the woods. While sleeping, she has a nightmare about her former life. The nightmare reveals that Michonne lived a comfortable life with her boyfriend Mike and her young son Andre before the apocalypse. While walking through the forest, she encounters a walker that looks disturbingly similar to her. Realizing the walkers will not attack her because they think she is already dead, Michonne chooses to embrace life instead and cuts down the entire herd of walkers. Following this, she has an emotional breakdown and has a brief monologue addressing Mike. Later in the episode she investigates footprints belonging to Rick and Carl and follows them to a house that they have taken shelter in, crying when she sees them.

In the episode "Claimed", Michonne joins Carl on a run for more supplies in the neighborhood and reveals more about her past in an effort to cheer him up. She reveals she had a three-year-old son named Andre Anthony who died shortly after the outbreak began. Rick, Carl and Michonne are forced to travel in the direction of a camp known as Terminus because a group of men intrude on their house. In the episode "Us", Michonne, Rick, and Carl are following a set of train tracks, and it is revealed that the group of men have been tracking them. In the season finale "A", Michonne, Rick and Carl are nearing Terminus. In the night they are ambushed by the group of marauders and held at gunpoint. Daryl, who is travelling with the marauders, attempts to reason with the leader – Joe (Jeff Kober), to no avail. Joe orders his gang to beat Daryl to death, before telling Rick his group will rape Michonne and Carl before assassinating him. Enraged when Dan (Keith Brooks) tries to rape Carl, Rick snaps and brutally kills Joe by biting out a chunk of his throat. In the following confusion, Michonne manages to get hold of a gun and kill two marauders. With the marauders dead, the reunited gang continue to Terminus.

On the outskirts of Terminus, Michonne confesses to Carl the details of Andre's death and the reasoning behind keeping two walker pets. Michonne reveals that she, her boyfriend Mike, his friend Terry, and her son Andre were part of a larger group when the outbreak first started. However, one day while Michonne was out scavenging for supplies for the group, Mike and Terry were getting high while looking after Andre. The group was attacked by a herd of walkers, resulting in Mike and Terry being bitten and Andre being killed. When Michonne returned and realized what happened, she let them turn and kept Mike and Terry as her walker pets, as a way of punishing them for allowing Andre to die. Michonne admits to Carl that she no longer wants to be that kind of person.

Upon entering Terminus and realizing it is a trap, Michonne along with Rick, Carl and Daryl flee across the grounds, to eventually become captured. Forced into a container, the group are reunited with Glenn, Maggie, Bob and Sasha, as well as meeting Sergeant Abraham Ford, Dr. Eugene Porter, Rosita Espinosa and Tara Chambler.

==== Season 5 ====
In the season five premiere "No Sanctuary" Michonne and the others are able to escape Terminus and are reunited with Carol (Melissa McBride), Tyreese and Judith. In the episode "Strangers", as the group continues travelling Michonne offers to take out a nearby walker only to realize her sword was left behind in Terminus and kills it with a gun instead. As they travel they encounter Fr. Gabriel Stokes (Seth Gilliam) whom they distrust but he gives them shelter in his church. Abraham tries to insist they travel to Washington D.C. where they can cure the outbreak, but Michonne insists to him they find supplies first. Later Gabriel leads Rick, Michonne, Bob and Sasha to a store to find supplies where Michonne reveals she found the sword after the apocalypse and learned how to use it then. In the episode "Four Walls and a Roof", the group takes shelter in the church while being hunted by the last of the cannibalistic members of Terminus. Rick's group gains the upper hand and Michonne helps in killing Gareth and the others. She discovers the Terminus group has been keeping her katana, which she takes back.

In the midseason premiere "What Happened and What's Going On", Michonne convinces Rick about going to Washington, D.C. The group runs out of gas and has to continue their journey on foot, eventually running out of food and water. The group trudge on sixty miles to DC, as they face a tornado in the process. In the episode "The Distance", Aaron (Ross Marquand) is introduced to the group, who reveals himself as a recruiter for a safe haven, Alexandria. They are hesitant to trust him because of what happened in Woodbury and Terminus. Rick initially decides not to take the risk, prompting Michonne to step in and challenge his decision. She argues that the group should give Aaron a chance for the sake of survival, successfully convincing Rick to change his mind. The group arrives at the gates of Alexandria the next day. Rick hears children laughing inside the community's walls, and Michonne smiles, knowing they have made the right decision.

In the episode "Remember", Rick's group has difficulty assimilating into the daily routines of the Alexandria residents. The people of Alexandria, led by politician Deanna Monroe (Tovah Feldshuh), have been shielded from many of the dangers and tribulations that the new world holds, which causes Rick's group to believe they are weak. Deanna asks Rick and Michonne to become the town constables, and they both accept their new roles. In the episode "Forget", Michonne has traded in her usual clothes for a police uniform. Deanna explains to Rick and Michonne that their basic roles as constables are to keep the peace and establish a sense of civilization inside the walls of Alexandria. Michonne is later seen hanging her sword on the fireplace mantle in her house in Alexandria.

In the episode "Try", Rick fights with Pete, an Alexandria resident, he begins to angrily rant to the gathered crowd and pointing a gun at them, Michonne eventually silences him by knocking him unconscious. In the season finale "Conquer", Rick admits to Michonne that he and Carol stole guns from the armory but did not tell her because he was afraid she could try to change his mind. He tries to return the gun to her, though Michonne says she would not have stopped him, and that she knocked out Rick to protect him, not Alexandria. She also tells Rick she is confident that they can find a way to integrate with Alexandria, but she will still be with him even if they cannot. At the town forum, Pete arrives, drunk and angered, during the meeting with Michonne's katana, bent on assassinating Rick, and Michonne witnesses him killing Reg, Rick killing Pete and Morgan's arrival. Michonne is later seen contemplating mounting her katana back on the wall, but ultimately decides to carry it.

==== Season 6 ====
Season 6 finds Rick, Michonne and the others struggling to keep the Alexandria members safe while also teaching them how to survive. In the season premiere "First Time Again", the group discovers an enormous herd of roamers trapped inside a quarry not far from Alexandria. They decide to use the herd as a learning opportunity and also eliminate the threat before it becomes a problem later. While trying to draw the herd away from the walls, Michonne, Rick, Morgan and a few others hear a horn sounding from Alexandria. The noise draws the attention of the walkers and the herd begins heading toward the walls.

In the mid-season finale episode "Start to Finish", the herd finally breaks through Alexandra's walls after knocking over the guard tower. Michonne, Rick, and Deanna flee towards the houses, but Deanna gets knocked over and falls onto a saw blade, causing a mortal wound to her side. Rick, Michonne, Deanna, Gabriel, Jessie, Carl, and others manage to get inside a house and struggle to keep the walkers from breaking in. Michonne tends to Deanna's wound, only to discover a walker bite on her side. Realizing her end is near, Deanna and Michonne bond while waiting out the herd. Michonne affirms her belief that the new plans Deanna drew up for Alexandria can still work, and Deanna encourages Michonne to find her own answer for what survival means for her. Michonne admits she is not sure, but promises she will figure it out. The walkers eventually break into the house and the group is forced to move quickly and leave the dying Deanna. Rick devises a plan for the group to cover themselves in guts from two walkers they have killed, which allows them to move outside the house undetected by the dead. However, Jessie's son, frightened by the situation, begins calling out to his mother as the group joins hands and moves through the herd. In the midseason premiere, Jessie and her sons are devoured by the walkers. Michonne is forced to stab Ron, who shoots Carl in the eye. Rick and Michonne get Carl to the infirmary and help the surviving residents drive the herd out of Alexandria.

A few months later, Alexandria is being rebuilt and things have more or less returned to normal. After sharing a sincere moment with Carl, Michonne realizes what she desires in her life. That night, she and Rick kiss and have sex, beginning a romantic relationship. However, Rick's group soon becomes involved in a conflict with Negan, who captures most of the survivors and kills one of them with "Lucille" a bat wrapped in barbed wire.

==== Season 7 ====
In the season premiere, "The Day Will Come When You Won't Be", Michonne witnesses the deaths of group members Abraham and Glenn. She is later held at gunpoint, along with the rest of the group, as Negan commands Rick to chop off Carl's left arm to remove the last of Rick's disobedience. Michonne tells Negan that they now understand, but Negan tells her that its Rick who does not understand. As Rick starts to comply, Negan stops Rick as it was all a test to break his will, which is successful.

In "Service", Michonne is shown walking outside Alexandria with a rifle she concealed in the house before the Saviors arrive. She is shown practicing her marksmanship by shooting at a walker with the rifle to prepare for the fight she feels is coming. When she returns, Rick states he needs the rifle as the Saviors want all their guns. Michonne does not want her community to surrender their guns, but eventually hands it over. Rick later tells her about his old partner and friend being Judith's real father, and that he had to accept it in order to raise her and keep her alive as his own daughter. Stating that this is their life now and he had to accept it as she does. Michonne later reappears in "Sing Me a Song", where she is shown walking along whistling to lure walkers. She then kills them and drags their bodies over to a pile. This causes a female Savior to stop driving and observe the pile, allowing Michonne to take her hostage and demand that she take her to Negan. The following episode, "Hearts Still Beating", they arrive outside the Sanctuary and Michonne realizes the power and scope of the Saviors. She later returns to find the Saviors killed Spencer and Olivia and took Eugene hostage. She finds Rick in the jail cell Morgan built and attempts to convince him that they are fighters and that, despite Negan's power, they can find a way to win. Rick agrees, having seen the costs of subjugation and the two reunite with Maggie and Daryl at the Hilltop (along with Carl, Rosita, and Tara) as the group walks off to plan their next move.

In "New Best Friends", Michonne is part of the group that meets with a new group. When Rick is tested by being pitted against an armored walker, Michonne helps advise him on how to kill it. He later gifts her a metal cat sculpture he found. In "Say Yes", Michonne goes out scavenging with Rick to find the guns they need. They enjoy their time alone together and are eventually able to discover a carnival wrought with reanimated soldiers. They stumble upon a large amount of packaged food and discuss their future after the Saviors have been dealt with. The next day, their plans go awry and they are quickly swarmed by walkers. At one point, Rick is seemingly killed and Michonne goes into a catatonic state, nearly allowing herself to be killed before Rick is revealed to be okay and they manage to win. Michonne later confides to Rick that she cannot bear the thought of losing him, but agrees that she will take charge if he dies in the upcoming fight. In the season finale "The First Day of the Rest of Your Life", Rick and his group are betrayed by Jadis and the Scavengers. Michonne participates in the ensuing battle, but she is badly hurt and nearly dies. She is later seen resting in bed, with Rick by her side.

==== Season 8 ====
The eighth season of the series focuses on the ongoing war against Negan and the Saviors, with both sides suffering several losses. Having been injured previously, Michonne does not make many appearances initially, but becomes more involved in the second half of the season. In the midseason premiere, "Honor", she and Rick deal with the aftermath of Carl being bitten by a walker. Michonne is forced to say a tearful goodbye as Carl, close to turning, shoots himself to prevent reanimation. In "The Lost and the Plunderers" she and Rick leave Alexandria after burying Carl and head towards Hilltop, stopping at the Junkyard on the way. Michonne seems shocked to find that all of Jadis’ people have been murdered. The couple eventually reach Hilltop.

In the final episode, the group fights Negan and the Saviors and wins. Instead of killing him, Rick only cuts his throat and decides to imprison him for his actions, much to the dismay and anger of Maggie. Michonne, however, supports Rick's decision.

==== Season 9 ====
The ninth season of the series finds Rick's group attempting to build new lives following an end to the conflict against the Saviors, with Negan being kept in the jail inside Alexandria. Despite the loss of Carl, Rick and Michonne have moved forward and have concentrated on building a future for the growing Judith. The couple also decides to start trying to conceive a baby together.

Michonne suggests that the communities have common laws that everyone follows, and begin drafting a charter.

Michonne stops Maggie from going into Negan's cell to kill him. Although Maggie wants revenge for him killing her husband Glenn, Michonne tells her that it will only start something else. However, Maggie is insistent, and Michonne steps aside for her to go in. Despite her chance, Maggie realizes Negan is a shadow of his former self, and decides that leaving him to suffer in the cell is better.

In the episode "What Comes After", Rick seemingly sacrifices himself by blowing up the bridge they were constructing to connect all the communities, in order to stop an oncoming herd of walkers, leaving Michonne devastated. Unknown to Michonne and everyone else, Rick actually survives the explosion and is taken away in a helicopter, accompanied by Jadis.

In the six years following his disappearance, it is revealed that Michonne has assumed leadership over the Alexandria community and was pregnant at the time of Rick's supposed demise; she is now a parent to Rick's daughter Judith (Cailey Fleming), as well as their own child together, Rick Jr. (RJ) Grimes (Antony Azor).

It becomes apparent that over the course of those six years, a major rift has formed between Michonne and the other communities. Simultaneously, Michonne and the others must deal with a new threat - the Whisperers, a group of people who survive among the walkers by wearing their skin on their faces and imitating the walkers ("Evolution"). Longtime ally Jesus (Tom Payne) is killed when he is caught off-guard and stabbed by a male Whisperer in a cemetery. Daryl kills the man and discovers they all wear walker skin over their faces.

In the episode “Scars”, some of the six-year time lapse is explored in a series of flashbacks. Michonne is shown visibly pregnant, having spent the last few months looking for Rick's body after the explosion, finding no trace of him except for his pistol (which she eventually gives to Judith). New survivors turn up at Alexandria's gates, among them Jocelyn (Rutina Wesley), Michonne's friend from her college days. Jocelyn reveals that she has been taking care of a group of children, and encourages Michonne to keep looking for Rick. During a sleepover, Jocelyn and her group steal supplies and other children from Alexandria, including Judith.

Michonne and Daryl eventually track down Jocelyn, who has them captured, tortured and branded. However, they escape, with Michonne confronting Jocelyn and the children. In the ensuing struggle, Jocelyn beats Michonne with a wooden plank, and one of the children slashes her pregnant belly. Michonne ultimately kills Jocelyn by stabbing her with her sword. When the children attack, she is forced to kill them all. However, she is successful in rescuing Judith and the Alexandrian kids.

The violent incident is shown to have ramifications years later; when Daryl shows up at Alexandria's gates with a wounded Henry and Lydia (Cassady McClincy), daughter of the Whisperers' leader Alpha (Samantha Morton), Michonne and Aaron are initially hesitant to allow Lydia in. However, Michonne allows them in, but only long enough for Henry to get medical attention. She refuses to provide an escort for them as they plan to travel to the Kingdom. Judith decides to sneak away on her own to protect them, taking Rick's pistol with her. Michonne sets out to track down Judith, arriving in time to save her from a group of walkers. They discuss what happened years before with Jocelyn, as Michonne was unaware Judith remembered the incident. Judith believes Michonne did the right thing at that time, but that Daryl and the others are still their allies and they should now help them. Michonne decides that Judith is right and they leave together to catch up with Daryl and the others.

==== Season 10 ====
The tenth season has been confirmed to be Michonne's last on the show, with Gurira exiting after a handful of episodes during the first half of the season.

The season focuses on the group's struggle to survive while under the omnipresent watch of Alpha and the Whisperers. In the midseason finale “The World Before”, Michonne meets a man named Virgil (Kevin Carroll). Michonne agrees to travel with him by boat to an abandoned island to help him find his family, in exchange for weapons the group can use against Alpha. Michonne leaves her children behind with Daryl, Carol, and the others, sailing away on a boat.

Michonne arrives at the naval base with Virgil but finds no weapons, soon realizing it's a trap; however, before she is able to leave, Virgil locks her up, and she finds there are other captives on the island. Virgil then drugs her, and she experiences hallucinogenic visions of Andrea and Siddiq, and what her life would have been had she never saved Andrea and met Rick. As she comes to, she stabs Virgil, escapes, and frees the others. She chases Virgil to a storage room where she finds Rick's boots. On a stranded naval ship where he says he found them, she also finds a phone with a drawing of her and Judith etched into it, suggesting that Rick may still be alive. She allows Virgil to live, takes leave of the others and contacts Judith via walkie-talkie to tell of her intent to find Rick. Taking two new walker pets fastened in chains, Michonne starts on her journey in the wilderness. She later finds two stragglers, a man and woman, who need help catching up to a large group of organized troops marching ahead of them. Thinking back on how Rick helped her all those years ago, she decides to help them. Michonne disposes of the walker pets and offers her hand to the injured man. The three of them then begin walking to catch up to the larger group.

==== Season 11 ====
In "For Blood," Judith asks Virgil what he knows about Michonne's departure. However, Virgil does not know the name of the man that Michonne went looking for, but he compares Judith to her adoptive mother.

In the series finale, a year after Michonne's departure to find Rick, she continues her search, although she appears to have parted ways with the group of survivors that she had encountered and resumed her journey alone on horseback. At the same time, Judith finally reveals the truth about Michonne's departure and Rick's survival to her friends. Setting out to search for other survivors, Daryl promises Judith that he will also try to find Rick and Michonne and bring them home.

=== The Walking Dead: The Ones Who Live ===
In the spin off series centered around Michonne and Rick, Michonne saves the couple she meets in her last episode of the main show “What We Become”, Aidan and Bailey, and their group, a constantly moving caravan. There she meets Nat. Nat creates armour and a grenade launcher for her, giving her a horse to get to Bridgers Terminal, where she hopes to find Rick, however, she encounters a large horde on the way there, and is saved by Nat, Aidan, Bailey, and other survivors that left the caravan. They accompany her to Bridgers Terminal, but are attacked by a CRM helicopter that launches Chlorine Gas on them, all but she and Nat are killed, and the two are forced to remain in their location for a year to remove the poison from their bodies.

After recovering they reach Bridgers Terminal, where the boat Rick's belongings were found last was, they find it destroyed with burned bodies. Nat convinces Michonne to return to her children, even if she believes Rick to still be alive. Along the way, they find another CRM helicopter and shoot it down, unknowingly killing Lieutenant Colonel Donald Okafor. As Michonne kills the surviving Frontliners, she reunites with Rick after almost killing him, although Nat is killed by a surviving soldier who is killed by Rick. As CRM helicopters arrive, Rick has Michonne place her sword in Nat's hand and act like he was the one who killed the soldiers, telling her that she has another name and to not call the dead "walkers;" pulling his gun on her, Rick promises that they will escape together and that he loves her.

Michonne convinces the CRM she is a woman named Dana, who was part of a large community with her sister, but their leaders were bad people and the community fell. She is told that no one who discovers the CRM's city is allowed to leave and becomes a consignee, survivors who must perform labour before being granted citizenship. She learns that Rick cut his own hand off in an escape attempt, and the two plan to escape together.

Michonne shows initiative and skill in dispatching walkers, drawing the attention of Command Sergeant Major Pearl Thorne (Lesley-Ann Brandt), who is unaware of Michonne's true identity and believes she is a survivor Rick found. Rick devises a plan for Michonne to escape the CRM, but when she realizes he does not intend to go with her, she returns the next day, much to Rick's dismay, because he believes the only way for her to escape is if he stays behind. Thorne gives Michonne a chance to prove her worth by joining her, Rick and a handful of soldiers on a mission to clear a mountainous area for the CRM. Although the mission is successful, Michonne is uninterested in following Thorne's orders, leading Thorne to nearly shoot her before Rick stops her. Flustered, Thorne sends Michonne away and instructs Rick to escort her back to the city. Before getting on the helicopter to return, Michonne is shocked to see Jadis and Rick tells her to ignore her and ends their relationship in an attempt to protect her. During the turbulent helicopter ride back toward the CRM, Michonne suddenly grabs Rick and jumps from the helicopter into the water with him.

After jumping from the helicopter, Michonne and Rick fall into a river outside of Greenwood, a community of innovators formed after the apocalypse began and which still has power and modern amenities. However, Greenwood fell at some point, likely to starvation, leaving it overrun with walkers. Michonne then proceeds to try and convince Rick to go back home with her, revealing they have a son together named Rick Jr. Rick still refuses to go back, telling her Jadis will kill everyone they know if they escape. They find out the helicopter they were in crashed in the storm, giving them the perfect opportunity to escape since the CRM will believe Rick and Michonne to be dead but Rick still says he will not go home with her intending to complete Okafor's mission to reform the CRM into something better. Michonne then decides to leave Rick behind, with Rick going after her shortly after. A CRM helicopter bombs the wreckage to destroy any evidence of the CRM's existence, trapping Rick and Michonne in a collapsing building full of walkers. Rick and Michonne slowly reconnect and have sex with each other. After this, Michonne gets through to Rick resulting in him admitting that he cannot see Carl's face anymore due to his traumas and that he is terrified to be with Michonne again as Rick would not survive losing her again. After Michonne gives Rick an iPhone engraved with Carl's portrait, she convinces Rick to go home with her. Rick and Michonne escape as Greenwood collapses and take one of the community's hybrid vehicles which has enough ethanol to get them home to Alexandria.

Making a stop to rest on their way to Alexandria, Rick and Michonne encounters and fight off a family of bandits and spend the night in Yellowstone National Park where Jadis, having deduced their survival, finds them. Jadis unsuccessfully tries to kill them and is badly wounded. She runs away and the couple goes after her in a car chase. Jadis then pulls the bandits into it, with Rick and Michonne being unable to kill Jadis due to her dossier that threatens Alexandria's safety. Jadis reveals that Rick was slated to receive the Echelon Briefing and move up in the CRM and reaches a deal where Rick will return to the CRM while Michonne can go home, but they double-cross each other and Jadis is fatally bitten by a walker in the melee. Before dying, she tells them where to find the dossier at Cascadia Base and gives Rick a wedding ring that Gabriel had found for him. Rick gives Michonne the wedding ring and they formally exchange vows. He and Michonne then decide to take Jadis' helicopter and return to the CRM to find the dossier and stop them once and for all.

Rick and Michonne then return to Cascadia Base where Michonne sneaks in and finds and destroys Jadis' dossier before attending a briefing for the Frontliners where Michonne learns that the CRM intends to abduct select children from Portland before destroying the city with chlorine gas. Rick kills Beale with his own sword and gives that sword to Michonne. Rick and Michonne rig up a makeshift bomb on the chlorine gas arsenal before being confronted by Thorne who had deduced the truth about Michonne's identity. Michonne is forced to kill Thorne and the bomb and the gas kills the CRM Force Command and all of the Frontliners. With the CRM's atrocities exposed and its command structure decimated, the civilian government takes over and reforms the CRM to aid other survivors while enabling free travel to and from the city. Rick and Michonne return home and are finally reunited with their children, Judith and R.J.

=== In other media ===
Michonne, alongside other The Walking Dead characters, appears in the adult comedy series Robot Chicken in the episode: "The Robot Chicken Walking Dead Special: Look Who's Walking", voiced again by Danai Gurira.

Michonne appears as a skin in Fortnite Battle Royale, with two selectable styles based on her season 5 appearance, with a hooded alternative style. She was released alongside a Daryl Dixon skin, bundled with her katana on December 17, 2020.

Michonne is a playable character in The Walking Dead: Destinies, voiced by Debra Wilson.

Michonne appears as an operator in Call of Duty: Modern Warfare III and Call of Duty: Warzone 2.0, voiced by Danai Gurira. She appears as part of the Tracer Pack: The Walking Dead - Michonne Operator Bundle released on 27 February 2024. Her appearance is based on her appearance in The Walking Dead: The Ones Who Live.

Michonne is a "survivor" playable character in an update of the game Dead by Daylight released in July 2025.

== Reception ==
Michonne was voted #86 on IGN's Top 100 Comic Book Heroes. Regarding the television portrayal of the character, her scowling expression, reserved nature, and "Magical Negro" qualities have been much-discussed by reviewers. Michonne's uniquely independent nature has been praised, with one website commenting, "A case could be made that no character is as independently strong as Michonne." However, others have criticized Michonne's lack of development on the show, writing that she "was quickly sinking into the "strong black woman" trope. She is constantly assaulted and manhandled with seemingly very little concern shown for her wellbeing."

Noel Murray of Rolling Stone ranked Michonne number one in a list of 30 best Walking Dead characters, saying, "She survived on her own for months, figuring out how to thrive in the wilderness under the harshest of circumstances. Yet she's also adapted well to living in a group, and has even started to draw on her pre-apocalypse past as a mother and an academic to start thinking about how best to rebuild society. Savage when she has to be, tender and affectionate with her friends and lovers, both nurturing and deadly as they come, this character (courtesy of Danai Gurira's continually extraordinary performance) represents this series at its best. Michonne hasn't lost touch with her humanity. And she's a thrill to watch on a killing spree."
