= Robert Kirkman bibliography =

- Active period: 2000–present

Publishers
- Image Comics: 2002–present
- Marvel Comics: 2003–2010

This is a bibliography of the comic book writer Robert Kirkman, the co-creator and writer of Invincible and The Walking Dead.

== Early work ==
Titles published by Funk-O-Tron, a company established by Kirkman early in his career, include:

- Battle Pope:
  - Battle Pope #1–4 (with Tony Moore, 2000) collected as Battle Pope: Genesis (tpb, 120 pages, 2001, ISBN 0-9708108-0-6)
  - Battle Pope: Mayhem (tpb, 96 pages, 2002, ISBN 0-9708108-1-4) collects:
    - Battle Pope: Mayhem #1–2 (with Matthew Roberts, 2001)
    - Battle Pope: Shorts #1 (with Tony Moore, Mark Kidwell, Brian Despain, Shane White, Matthew Roberts and Terry Stevens, 2001)
  - Battle Pope: Shorts #2 (with Tony Moore, Jonboy Meyers and Cory Walker; Robert Sutton is credited as a co-writer on one of the stories, 2001)
  - Battle Pope Presents: Saint Michael #1–3 (with Terry Stevens, 2001) collected as Battle Pope: Saint Michael (tpb, 96 pages, 2002, ISBN 0-9708108-2-2)
  - Battle Pope: Shorts #3 (with Matthew Roberts, Cory Walker and E. J. Su, 2001)
  - Battle Pope Christmas Pope-tacular (with Tony Moore and Cory Walker, 2001)
  - Battle Pope: Wrath of God #1–3 (with Tony Moore, 2002)
- Inkpunks Quarterly #1–3 (anthology, 2001–2002) featuring:
  - "Pitchbright" (written by Walter Conley, drawn by E. J. Su)
  - "Kung Foo Sally" (written and drawn by Matthew Roberts)
  - "Nautilus" (written by Jason Tondro, drawn by Jonboy Meyers)
  - "Chaser's Moon" (written by Kimo, drawn by Carson Grubaugh)
- Double Take (anthology):
  - Issue #1 (Jul 2001) featured "Codename: Mayday!" (written and drawn by Jonboy Meyers) and "Evil Waise" (written and drawn by Jason Craig)
  - The following three issues adopted the numbering of the Double Image anthology, then-recently canceled by Image after its fifth issue.
    - Issues #6–8 (Nov 2001–Jan 2002) featured the continuation of the "Codeflesh" serial (written by Joe Casey, drawn by Charlie Adlard)
    - Issues #6–8 also featured the print debut of Matt Fraction with the "Rex Mantooth" serial (written by Fraction, drawn by Andy Kuhn)
  - Issue #2 (Apr 2002) featured "Tommi Trek" (written by Brian Miller, drawn by Mike Worley) and "Tales of the Realm" (written and drawn by Matt Tyree)
  - Issue #3 (Jun 2002) featured "Legend of Stone Monkey" (written by Steve Cobb, drawn by E. J. Su) and "Vice Worlds" (written and drawn by Khary Randolph)

== Image Comics ==
Titles published by Image include:

- SuperPatriot (Highbrow):
  - SuperPatriot: America's Fighting Force #1–4 (with Cory Walker, 2002) collected as SuperPatriot: America's Fighting Force (tpb, 128 pages, 2011, ISBN 1-60706-355-7)
  - SuperPatriot: War on Terror #1–4 (with E. J. Su; Benito Cereno is credited for "script assist" in issue #3, 2004–2007)
- Masters of the Universe (MVCreations):
  - Masters of the Universe: Dream Halloween: "Hope" (as letterer; written by Val Staples, drawn by Enza Fontana, one-shot, 2002)
  - Masters of the Universe: TDK Promotional Comic: "The Battle Begins" (as letterer; written by Val Staples, drawn by Emiliano Santalucia, 2002)
  - Masters of the Universe — Icons of Evil: Beastman (script by Kirkman from a plot by Kirkman, Val Staples and Ian Richter, art by Tony Moore, one-shot, 2003)
    - The rest of the Icons of Evil one-shots, also scripted by Kirkman, were published after MVCreations became an imprint of CrossGen.
    - Collected in Masters of the Universe: Icons of Evil (tpb, 176 pages, CrossGen, 2004, ISBN 0-9748008-0-5)
- Tech Jacket #1–6 (with E. J. Su, 2002–2003) collected as Tech Jacket: Lost and Found (tpb, 144 pages, 2003, ISBN 1-58240-314-7)
  - Kirkman's plots for issues #7–8 were repurposed into a back-up feature in Invincible #71–75, 77–78 and 80 (written by Aubrey Sitterson, drawn by E. J. Su, 2010–2011)
  - The back-up feature was collected into digital-only issues Tech Jacket #7–8 (2013) and included in Tech Jacket: Lift Off (tpb, 128 pages, 2014, ISBN 1-63215-029-8)
- Invincible (with Cory Walker and Ryan Ottley; published under Skybound starting with issue #74, 2003–2018) collected as:
  - Ultimate Collection Volume 1 (collects #1–13, hc, 400 pages, 2005, ISBN 1-58240-500-X)
  - Ultimate Collection Volume 2 (collects #0, 14–24, hc, 352 pages, 2006, ISBN 1-58240-594-8)
    - Includes the Invincible short story from the Free Comic Book Day 2004: Image Comics special (written by Kirkman, art by Ryan Ottley, 2004)
  - Ultimate Collection Volume 3 (collects #25–35, hc, 336 pages, 2007, ISBN 1-58240-763-0)
    - Includes the fourth issue of the second volume of The Pact crossover limited series (written by Kirkman, art by Jason Howard, 2006)
  - Ultimate Collection Volume 4 (collects #36–47, hc, 336 pages, 2009, ISBN 1-58240-989-7)
  - Ultimate Collection Volume 5 (collects #48–59 and The Astounding Wolf-Man #11, hc, 336 pages, 2010, ISBN 1-60706-116-3)
  - Ultimate Collection Volume 6 (collects #60–70, hc, 336 pages, 2011, ISBN 1-60706-360-3)
    - Includes the Invincible Returns one-shot (written by Kirkman, art by Cory Walker and Ryan Ottley, 2010)
  - Ultimate Collection Volume 7 (collects #71–84, hc, 384 pages, 2012, ISBN 1-60706-509-6)
  - Ultimate Collection Volume 8 (collects #85–96, hc, 336 pages, 2013, ISBN 1-60706-680-7)
  - Ultimate Collection Volume 9 (collects #97–108, hc, 336 pages, 2014, ISBN 1-63215-032-8)
  - Ultimate Collection Volume 10 (collects #109–120, hc, 336 pages, 2015, ISBN 1-63215-494-3)
  - Ultimate Collection Volume 11 (collects #121–132, hc, 304 pages, 2017, ISBN 1-5343-0045-7)
  - Ultimate Collection Volume 12 (collects #133–144, hc, 344 pages, 2018, ISBN 1-5343-0658-7)
  - Compendium One (collects #0–47, The Pact vol. 2 #4 and Free Comic Book Day 2004: Image Comics, tpb, 1,024 pages, 2011, ISBN 1-60706-411-1)
  - Compendium Two (collects #48–96, The Astounding Wolf-Man #11 and the Invincible Returns one-shot, tpb, 1,184 pages, 2013, ISBN 1-60706-772-2)
  - Compendium Three (collects #97–144, tpb, 1,104 pages, 2018, ISBN 1-5343-0686-2)
- Savage Dragon (Highbrow):
  - Savage Dragon #109–118: "Mighty Man" (as letterer; co-written by Gary Carlson and Erik Larsen, drawn by Mark Englert, co-feature, 2003–2004)
  - Savage Dragon: God War #1–4 (with Mark Englert, 2004–2005)
- Brit: Old Soldier (tpb, 176 pages, 2007, ISBN 1-58240-678-2) collects:
  - Brit (with Tony Moore, one-shot, 2003)
  - Brit: Cold Death (with Tony Moore, one-shot, 2003)
  - Brit: Red, White, Black & Blue (with Cliff Rathburn, one-shot, 2004)
- Capes #1–3 (with Mark Englert, 2003)
  - Continued as a back-up feature in Invincible #27–31, 34–38 and 40–41 (written by Kirkman, drawn by Mark Englert, 2005–2007)
  - The series, along with the back-up feature, is collected as Capes: Punching the Clock (tpb, 144 pages, 2007, ISBN 1-58240-756-8)
- The Walking Dead:
  - The Walking Dead (with Tony Moore and Charlie Adlard; published under Skybound starting with issue #76, 2003–2019) collected as:
    - Book One (collects #1–12, hc, 304 pages, 2006, ISBN 1-58240-619-7)
      - Includes the Morgan Jones short story from Image Holiday Special 2005 (written by Kirkman, art by Charlie Adlard, 2005)
    - Book Two (collects #13–24, hc, 304 pages, 2007, ISBN 1-58240-698-7)
    - Book Three (collects #25–36, hc, 304 pages, 2007, ISBN 1-58240-825-4)
    - Book Four (collects #37–48, hc, 304 pages, 2008, ISBN 1-60706-000-0)
    - Book Five (collects #49–60, hc, 304 pages, 2010, ISBN 1-60706-171-6)
    - Book Six (collects #61–72, hc, 304 pages, 2010, ISBN 1-60706-327-1)
    - Book Seven (collects #73–84, hc, 304 pages, 2011, ISBN 1-60706-439-1)
    - Book Eight (collects #85–96, hc, 336 pages, 2012, ISBN 1-60706-593-2)
    - Book Nine (collects #97–108, hc, 336 pages, 2013, ISBN 1-60706-798-6)
    - Book Ten (collects #109–120, hc, 304 pages, 2014, ISBN 1-63215-034-4)
    - Book Eleven (collects #121–132, hc, 396 pages, 2015, ISBN 1-63215-271-1)
    - Book Twelve (collects #133–144, hc, 396 pages, 2015, ISBN 1-63215-451-X)
    - Book Thirteen (collects #145–156, hc, 396 pages, 2016, ISBN 1-63215-916-3)
    - Book Fourteen (collects #157–168, hc, 396 pages, 2017, ISBN 1-5343-0329-4)
    - Book Fifteen (collects #169–180, hc, 396 pages, 2018, ISBN 1-5343-0850-4)
    - Book Sixteen (collects #181–193, hc, 396 pages, 2019, ISBN 1-5343-1325-7)
    - Compendium One (collects #1–48, tpb, 1,088 pages, 2009, ISBN 1-60706-076-0)
    - Compendium Two (collects #49–96, tpb, 1,068 pages, 2012, ISBN 1-60706-596-7)
    - Compendium Three (collects #97–144, tpb, 1,088 pages, 2015, ISBN 1-63215-456-0)
    - Compendium Four (collects #145–193, tpb, 1,096 pages, 2019, ISBN 1-5343-1340-0)
  - Playboy #2012–04: "Michonne's Story" (with Charlie Adlard, six-page co-feature, 2012)
  - Liberty Annual '12: "Governor" (with Charlie Adlard, anthology, 2012) collected in CBLDF Presents: Liberty (hc, 216 pages, 2014, ISBN 1-60706-937-7; tpb, 2016, ISBN 1-60706-996-2)
  - Free Comic Book Day 2013: The Walking Dead (new untitled short story focusing on Tyreese along with the Morgan, Michonne and Governor stories, with Charlie Adlard, 2013)
  - Image Plus #1–16: "Here's Negan!" (with Charlie Adlard, co-feature, 2016–2017) collected as The Walking Dead: Here's Negan (hc, 72 pages, 2017, ISBN 1-5343-0327-8)
  - The Walking Dead: The Alien (written by Brian K. Vaughan, drawn by Marcos Martín, digital one-shot published at Panel Syndicate, 2016)
    - Published in print under Skybound as The Walking Dead: The Alien (hc, 72 pages, 2020, ISBN 1-5343-1659-0)
  - Negan Lives! (with Charlie Adlard, one-shot, 2020)
  - Skybound X #1–5: "Rick Grimes 2000" (with Ryan Ottley, lead feature in the anthology, 2021) collected as Rick Grimes 2000 (hc, 64 pages, 2022, ISBN 1-5343-2223-X)
    - Issue #1 of the anthology also featured a Clementine short story which served as a prologue to the series of graphic novels, all written and drawn by Tillie Walden:
      - Clementine Book One (256 pages, 2022, ISBN 1-5343-2128-4)
      - Clementine Book Two (296 pages, 2023, ISBN 1-5343-2519-0)
  - Crossover #12 (ten-page segment featuring Negan and Kirkman himself, with Phil Hester, 2022) collected in Crossover: The Ten-Cent Plague (tpb, 176 pages, 2022, ISBN 1-5343-1928-X)
- Cloudfall (with E. J. Su, one-shots):
  - Cloudfall (2003)
  - Cloudfall: Loose Ends (unreleased)
- Reaper (with Cliff Rathburn, one-shot, 2004)
- Noble Causes: Extended Family #2: "Rite of Passage" (with Cory Walker, anthology, 2004) collected in Noble Causes Archives Volume 2 (tpb, 598 pages, 2009, ISBN 1-58240-931-5)
- Battle Pope (colorized reprints of the Funk-O-Tron series (excluding Saint Michael) along with the new pages created by Tony Moore for the original collections, 2005–2007) collected as:
  - Genesis (collects #1–4, tpb, 120 pages, 2006, ISBN 1-58240-572-7)
  - Mayhem (collects #5–8, tpb, 120 pages, 2006, ISBN 1-58240-652-9)
  - Pillow Talk (collects #9–11, tpb, 128 pages, 2007, ISBN 1-58240-677-4)
  - Wrath of God (collects #12–14, tpb, 128 pages, 2007, ISBN 1-58240-751-7)
- The Golden Agers (with Scott Kurtz, unproduced 3-issue limited series — initially announced in 2005)
- Four Letter Worlds: "Blam" (with Matthew Roberts, anthology graphic novel, 144 pages, 2005, ISBN 1-58240-439-9)
- Loaded Bible (as "executive producer"; series of one-shots written by Tim Seeley from a story by Tim and Steve Seeley):
  - Loaded Bible: Jesus vs. Vampires (drawn by Nate Bellegarde, 2006)
  - Loaded Bible: Blood of Christ (drawn by Mike Norton, 2007)
- The Astounding Wolf-Man (with Jason Howard, 2007–2010) collected as:
  - Volume 1 (collects #1–7, tpb, 196 pages, 2008, ISBN 1-58240-862-9)
  - Volume 2 (collects #8–12 and Invincible #57, tpb, 160 pages, 2009, ISBN 1-60706-007-8)
    - Includes the Wolf-Man short story from the Monster Pile-Up one-shot (written by Kirkman, art by Jason Howard, 2008)
  - Volume 3 (collects #13–18, tpb, 166 pages, 2010, ISBN 1-60706-111-2)
  - Volume 4 (collects #19–25, tpb, 160 pages, 2011, ISBN 1-60706-249-6)
  - Complete Collection (collects #1–25, Invincible #57 and Monster Pile-Up, hc, 656 pages, 2017, ISBN 1-5343-0364-2)
- Brit (as story editor; written by Bruce Brown, drawn by Cliff Rathburn and Nate Bellegarde, 2007–2009) collected as:
  - AWOL (collects #1–6, tpb, 160 pages, 2008, ISBN 1-58240-864-5)
  - FUBAR (collects #7–12, tpb, 160 pages, 2009, ISBN 1-60706-061-2)
- Invincible Presents: Atom Eve and Rex Splode (tpb, 144 pages, 2010, ISBN 1-60706-255-0) collects:
  - Invincible Presents: Atom Eve #1–2 (as story editor; written by Benito Cereno, drawn by Nate Bellegarde, 2007–2008)
  - Invincible Presents: Atom Eve and Rex Splode #1–3 (as story editor; written by Benito Cereno, drawn by Nate Bellegarde, 2009–2010)
- Haunt (co-created by Kirkman and Todd McFarlane; written by Kirkman, art by Ryan Ottley, Greg Capullo and Sheldon Vella (#17–18), 2009–2011) collected as:
  - Volume 1 (collects #1–5, tpb, 160 pages, 2010, ISBN 1-60706-154-6)
  - Volume 2 (collects #6–12, tpb, 160 pages, 2011, ISBN 1-60706-229-1)
  - Volume 3 (collects #13–18, tpb, 160 pages, 2012, ISBN 1-60706-552-5)
  - The Immortal Edition: Book One (collects #1–12, hc, 288 pages, 2011, ISBN 1-60706-241-0)
  - The Immortal Edition: Book Two (includes #13–18, hc, 360 pages, cancelled, ISBN 1-60706-661-0)
- Pilot Season (series of one-shots starring characters co-created by Kirkman and Marc Silvestri, Top Cow):
  - Murderer (written by Kirkman, art by Nelson Blake II, 2009)
  - These one-shots were continued as series under Skybound:
    - Demonic (written by Kirkman, art by Joe Benitez, 2010)
    - Stealth (written by Kirkman, art by Sheldon Mitchell, 2010)
    - Stellar (written by Kirkman, art by Bernard Chang, 2010)
    - Hardcore (written by Kirkman, art by Brian Stelfreeze, 2012)
- Image United #1–3 (of 6) (with Rob Liefeld, Erik Larsen, Todd McFarlane, Marc Silvestri, Whilce Portacio, and Jim Valentino, 2009–2010)
  - The series was preceded by a 4-part prologue running as a back-up feature in Savage Dragon #153, Witchblade #131, Invincible #67 and Spawn #195 (cover-dated Oct 2009)
  - The prologue, written by Kirkman and drawn by Larsen, Portacio and Ryan Ottley, was reprinted as Image United #0 in an attempt to bridge the delays between the regular issues.
  - Another such attempt was Image United: Interlude, to be written by Kirkman and drawn by Ottley. This one-shot, along with the last three issues of the series, was never released.
- Sea Bear and Grizzly Shark: "The Origin of the Bear, and the Origin of the Shark" (short preface for the one-shot written and drawn by Jason Howard and Ryan Ottley, 2010)
- Outlaw Territory Volume 2: "Man on a Horse: A Dawson Brothers Tale" (with Shaun O'Neil, anthology graphic novel, 240 pages, 2011, ISBN 1-60706-321-2)
- Spawn:
  - Spawn #200: "Prologue" (script and art, 2011)
  - Gunslinger Spawn #1 (variant cover illustration, 2021)

=== Skybound ===
Titles published under Skybound (imprint of Image as well as a multimedia company co-founded by Kirkman in 2010) include:

- Guardians of the Globe:
  - Guarding the Globe #1–6 (written by Benito Cereno, drawn by Ransom Getty and Kris Anka (#6), 2010–2011) collected as Guarding the Globe: Under Siege (tpb, 144 pages, 2012, ISBN 1-60706-356-5)
  - Guarding the Globe vol. 2 #1–6 (written by Phil Hester, drawn by Todd Nauck, 2012–2013) collected as Guarding the Globe: Hard to Kill (tpb, 160 pages, 2013, ISBN 1-60706-673-4)
  - Invincible Universe (written by Phil Hester, drawn by Todd Nauck, 2013–2014) collected as:
    - On Deadly Ground (collects #1–6, tpb, 144 pages, 2013, ISBN 1-60706-820-6)
    - Above the Law (collects #7–12, tpb, 144 pages, 2014, ISBN 1-60706-986-5)
- Science Dog Special #1–2 (with Cory Walker, 2010–2011) collected as Science Dog (hc, 64 pages, 2011, ISBN 1-60706-423-5)
  - Reprints of the Science Dog stories previously published as back-up features in Invincible #25, 50 and 75 along with a new short story.
  - Three more Science Dog stories were published in Oblivion Song #25 (2020) and anthology series Skybound X #3 (2021) and Image! #12 (2023)
- Super Dinosaur (with Jason Howard, 2011–2014) collected as:
  - Volume 1 (collects #1–5 and Free Comic Book Day 2011: Super Dinosaur, tpb, 128 pages, 2011, ISBN 1-60706-420-0)
  - Volume 2 (collects #6–10, tpb, 112 pages, 2012, ISBN 1-60706-568-1)
  - Volume 3 (collects #11–17, tpb, 112 pages, 2013, ISBN 1-60706-667-X)
  - Volume 4 (collects #18–23, tpb, 128 pages, 2015, ISBN 1-60706-843-5)
- Witch Doctor (written by Brandon Seifert, drawn by Lukas Ketner):
  - Witch Doctor #1–4 (2011)
  - Witch Doctor: The Resuscitation (2011)
  - Witch Doctor: Mal Practice #1–6 (2012–2013)
- The Infinite #1–4 (with Rob Liefeld, 2011)
- Thief of Thieves (drawn by Shawn Martinbrough, 2012–2019)
  - Issues #1–7, co-written by Kirkman and Nick Spencer, are collected as Volume 1: I Quit (tpb, 152 pages, 2012, ISBN 1-60706-592-4)
  - Issues #8–13, co-written by Kirkman and James Asmus, are collected as Volume 2: Help Me (tpb, 144 pages, 2013, ISBN 1-60706-676-9)
  - Issues #14–19, co-written by Kirkman and Andy Diggle, are collected as Volume 3: Venice (tpb, 128 pages, 2014, ISBN 1-60706-844-3)
  - The rest of the series, written by Diggle solo, is collected as:
    - Volume 4: The Hit List (collects #20–25, tpb, 128 pages, 2014, ISBN 1-63215-037-9)
    - Volume 5: Take Me (collects #26–31, tpb, 128 pages, 2016, ISBN 1-63215-401-3)
    - Volume 6: Gold Rush (collects #32–37, tpb, 128 pages, 2017, ISBN 1-5343-0037-6)
  - Issues #38–43, written by Brett Lewis, are collected as Volume 7: Closure (tpb, 128 pages, 2019, ISBN 1-5343-1036-3)
- Clone #1–20 (written by David Schulner with Aaron Ginsburg and Wade McIntyre, drawn by Juan José Ryp, 2012–2014)
- Ghosted #1–20 (written by Joshua Williamson, drawn by Goran Sudžuka, Davide Gianfelice and Vladimir Krstić, 2013–2015)
- The Art of Charlie Adlard (features commentary from Kirkman; hc, 192 pages, 2013, ISBN 1-60706-803-6)
- Manifest Destiny #1–48 (written by Chris Dingess, drawn by Matthew Roberts, 2013–2022)
  - A short Manifest Destiny story was published in Skybound X #1 (anthology, 2021)
- Dead Body Road (written by Justin Jordan):
  - Dead Body Road #1–6 (drawn by Matteo Scalera, 2013–2014)
  - Dead Body Road: Bad Blood #1–6 (drawn by Ben Tiesma, 2020)
- Tech Jacket vol. 2 (written by Joe Keatinge, drawn by Khary Randolph, 2014–2015) collected as:
  - Lift Off (includes #1–3 of the digital-only prelude series, tpb, 128 pages, 2014, ISBN 1-63215-029-8)
  - Touch the Sky (collects #1–6, tpb, 144 pages, 2015, ISBN 1-63215-257-6)
  - All Falls Down (collects #7–12, tpb, 144 pages, 2016, ISBN 1-63215-344-0)
- Outcast by Kirkman and Azaceta (with Paul Azaceta, 2014–2021) collected as:
  - Book One (collects #1–12, hc, 296 pages, 2016, ISBN 1-5343-0091-0)
  - Book Two (collects #13–24, hc, 272 pages, 2017, ISBN 1-5343-0439-8)
  - Book Three (collects #25–36, hc, 272 pages, 2019, ISBN 1-5343-1230-7)
  - Book Four (collects #37–48, hc, 272 pages, 2021, ISBN 1-5343-1710-4)
  - Compendium (collects #1–48, tpb, 1,000 pages, 2021, ISBN 1-5343-2001-6)
- Birthright #1–50 (written by Joshua Williamson, drawn by Andrei Bressan, 2014–2021)
  - A short Birthright epilogue story was published in Skybound X #2 (anthology, 2021)
- Green Valley #1–9 (written by Max Landis, drawn by Giuseppe Camuncoli, 2016–2017)
- Horizon #1–18 (written by Brandon Thomas, drawn by Juan Gedeon, 2016–2018)
- Demonic #1–6 (written by Christopher Sebela, drawn by Niko Walter, 2016–2017) collected as Demonic (tpb, 128 pages, 2017, ISBN 1-5343-0057-0)
  - Continuation of the Pilot Season: Demonic one-shot (written by Kirkman, art by Joe Benitez, Top Cow, 2010)
- Evolution #1–18 (co-written by James Asmus, Joe Keatinge, Christopher Sebela and Joshua Williamson, drawn by Joe Infurnari, 2017–2019)
- Extremity #1–12 (written and drawn by Daniel Warren Johnson, 2017–2018)
- Redneck #1–ongoing (written by Donny Cates, drawn by Lisandro Estherren, 2017–...)
  - A short Redneck story was published in Skybound X #4 (anthology, 2021)
- Kill the Minotaur #1–6 (written by Chris Pasetto and Christian Cantamessa, drawn by Lukas Ketner, 2017)
- Gasolina #1–18 (written by Sean Mackiewicz, drawn by Niko Walter, 2017–2019)
  - A short Gasolina story was published in Skybound X #5 (anthology, 2021)
- Slots #1–6 (written and drawn by Dan Panosian, 2017–2018)
- Oblivion Song (with Lorenzo De Felici, 2018–2022) collected as:
  - Book One (collects #1–12, hc, 280 pages, 2020, ISBN 1-5343-1688-4)
  - Book Two (collects #13–24, hc, 272 pages, 2021, ISBN 1-5343-1950-6)
  - Book Three (collects #25–36, hc, 272 pages, 2022, ISBN 1-5343-2231-0)
- Crude #1–6 (written by Steve Orlando, drawn by Garry Brown, 2018)
- Stellar #1–6 (written by Joe Keatinge, drawn by Bret Blevins, 2018) collected as Stellar (tpb, 128 pages, 2019, ISBN 1-5343-0870-9)
  - Continuation of the Pilot Season: Stellar one-shot (written by Kirkman, art by Bernard Chang, Top Cow, 2010)
- Die!Die!Die! (co-written by Kirkman and Scott M. Gimple, art by Chris Burnham, 2018–ongoing) collected as:
  - Volume 1 (collects #1–8, tpb, 176 pages, 2019, ISBN 1-5343-1214-5)
  - Volume 2 (collects #9–14, tpb, 128 pages, 2021, ISBN 1-5343-1707-4)
- Outpost Zero #1–14 (written by Sean McKeever, drawn by Alexandre Tefenkgi, 2018–2019)
- Murder Falcon #1–8 (written and drawn by Daniel Warren Johnson, 2018–2019)
  - A short Murder Falcon story was published in Skybound X #3 (anthology, 2021)
- Outer Darkness (written by John Layman, drawn by Afu Chan):
  - Outer Darkness #1–12 (2018–2019)
  - Outer Darkness/Chew #1–3 (additional art by Rob Guillory, 2020)
- Hardcore (continuation of the Pilot Season: Hardcore one-shot written by Kirkman, drawn by Brian Stelfreeze and published by Top Cow, 2012):
  - Hardcore #1–5 (written by Andy Diggle, drawn by Alessandro Vitti, 2018–2019) collected as Hardcore Volume 1 (tpb, 112 pages, 2019, ISBN 1-5343-1229-3)
  - Hardcore Reloaded #1–5 (written by Brandon Thomas, drawn by Francis Portela, 2019–2020) collected as Hardcore Volume 2 (tpb, 112 pages, 2020, ISBN 1-5343-1596-9)
- Assassin Nation #1–5 (written by Kyle Starks, drawn by Erica Henderson, 2019)
  - A short Assassin Nation story was published in Skybound X #3 (anthology, 2021)
- Excellence #1–12 (written by Brandon Thomas, drawn by Khary Randolph, 2019–2022)
  - A short Excellence story was published in Skybound X #4 (anthology, 2021)
- Reaver #1–11 (written by Justin Jordan, drawn by Rebekah Isaacs and Niko Henrichon, 2019–2020)
- Heart Attack #1–6 (written by Shawn Kittelsen, drawn by Eric Zawadzki, 2019–2020)
- Stealth #1–6 (written by Mike Costa, drawn by Nate Bellegarde, 2020) collected as Stealth (tpb, 128 pages, 2020, ISBN 1-5343-1695-7)
  - Continuation of the Pilot Season: Stealth one-shot (written by Kirkman, art by Sheldon Mitchell, Top Cow, 2010)
- Fire Power (with Chris Samnee, 2020–ongoing) collected as:
  - Prelude (graphic novel, 160 pages, 2020, ISBN 1-5343-1655-8)
  - Home Fire (collects #1–6, tpb, 152 pages, 2021, ISBN 1-5343-1718-X)
- Stillwater #1–18 (written by Chip Zdarsky, drawn by Ramón K. Pérez, 2020–2023)
  - A short Stillwater story was published in Skybound X #2 (anthology, 2021)
  - The series was supplemented by Stillwater: The Escape (one-shot, 2022) which featured stories by Jason Loo, Ethan Young and Andrew Wheeler with Soo Lee.
- The Walking Dead Deluxe #1–ongoing (colorized reprints of the original series with commentary from Kirkman, 2020–...)
- Solid Blood #17 (with Ryan Ottley, 2020)
- Ultramega #1–4 (written and drawn by James Harren, 2021)
  - A short Ultramega story was published in Skybound X #1 (anthology, 2021)
- Summoners War (written by Justin Jordan, drawn by Luca Claretti):
  - Summoners War: Legacy #1–6 (2021)
  - Summoners War: Awakening #1–6 (2023)
- Six Sidekicks of Trigger Keaton #1–6 (written by Kyle Starks, drawn by Chris Schweizer, 2021)
  - A short Six Sidekicks of Trigger Keaton story was published in Skybound X #5 (anthology, 2021)
- Skybound X (anthology):
  - "C.O.D.E." (with Jason Howard, in #5, 2021)
  - "Battle Beast" (with Ryan Ottley, in #25, 2022)
- Trover Saves the Universe #1–5 (written and drawn by Tess Stone, 2021)
- Lego Ninjago: Garmadon #1–5 (written and drawn by Tri Vuong, 2022)
- I Hate This Place #1–ongoing (written by Kyle Starks, drawn by Artyom Topilin, 2022–...)
- Skybound Presents: Afterschool (anthology, 2022):
  - Issue #1 is co-written by Justin Benson with Aaron Moorhead and drawn by Greg Hinkle.
  - Issue #2 is co-written by Kate Herron with Briony Redman and drawn by Leila Leiz.
  - Issue #3 is written by Jill Blotevogel and drawn by Marley Zarcone.
  - Issue #4 is written by Leon Hendrix III and drawn by Eric Zawadzki.
- Impact Winter (written by Travis Beacham, drawn by Stephen Green, one-shot, 2022)
- Creepshow (anthology):
  - Creepshow #1–5 (2022–2023)
    - Issue #1 featured "Take One" (written and drawn by Chris Burnham) and "Shingo" (co-written by Paul Dini and Stephen Langford, drawn by John McCrea)
    - Issue #2 featured "The Gorgahmorahh Tree" (co-written by David Lapham and his wife Maria, drawn by Lapham) and "Creator's Rites" (written by Steve Foxe, drawn by Erica Henderson)
    - Issue #3 featured "Hair" (co-written by Francesco Francavilla and his wife Lisa Marlow, drawn by Francavilla) and "The Bridge" (written by Ariela Kristantina, drawn by Jorge Corona)
    - Issue #4 featured "Come Out, Come Out, Wherever You are" (written by Kyle Starks, drawn by Fran Galán) and "La Mascara de la Muerte" (written by Henry Barajas, drawn by Dani)
    - Issue #5 featured "Thirst Trap" (written by Steve Orlando, drawn by Marianna Ignazzi) and "Husk (written by Clay McLeod Chapman, drawn by Anwita Citriya)
  - Creepshow vol. 2 #1–5 (2023–2024)
- Everyday Hero Machine Boy (written and drawn by Irma Kniivila with Tri Vuong, graphic novel, 2022)
  - A short Everyday Hero Machine Boy prelude story was published in Skybound X #2 (anthology, 2021)
- Sea Serpent's Heir (written by Mairghread Scott, drawn by Pablo Tunica, graphic novel, 2022)
  - A short Sea Serpent's Heir prelude story was published in Skybound X #4 (anthology, 2021)
- Dark Ride #1–ongoing (written by Joshua Williamson, drawn by Andrei Bressan, 2022–...)
  - A short Dark Ride prelude story was published in Skybound X #25 (anthology, 2022)
- Lastman Volume 1–ongoing (written by Bastien Vivès and Balak, drawn by Vivès and Michaël Sanlaville, 2022–...)
- Kroma #1–4 (written and drawn by Lorenzo De Felici, 2022–2023)
  - A short Kroma prelude story was published in Skybound X #25 (anthology, 2022)
- Scurry (written and drawn by Mac Smith, print collection of the eponymous webcomic series, 2023)
  - A short Scurry prelude story was published in Skybound X #25 (anthology, 2022)
- Invincible Universe: Battle Beast #1–9 (drawn by Ryan Ottley, 2025–2026)
  - A short Battle Beast prelude story was published in Skybound X #25 (anthology, 2022)
- Skinbreaker #1–8 (drawn by David Finch, 2025–2026)
- Terminal #1–ongoing (Co-written with Joe Casey, drawn by Andy Kubert, David Finch, and Arthur Adams, 2026)

== Marvel Comics ==
Titles published by Marvel include:

- Epic Anthology #1: "Sleepwalker: New Beginnings" (with Khary Randolph, 2004)
  - Originally written for an ongoing Sleepwalker series, the completed first issue was instead printed in this anthology, which in turn was cancelled after its first issue.
- X-Men Unlimited vol. 2 #2: "All the Rage" (with Takeshi Miyazawa, anthology, 2004) collected in Astonishing X-Men Companion (tpb, 168 pages, 2020, ISBN 1-302-92285-8)
- Spider-Man Unlimited vol. 3 #4: "Love Withdrawal" (with Cory Walker, anthology, 2004)
- Captain America vol. 4 #29–32: "Super Patriot" (with Scot Eaton, 2004) collected as Captain America Disassembled (tpb, 168 pages, 2004, ISBN 0-7851-1648-6)
- Marvel Knights 2099 (tpb, 120 pages, 2005, ISBN 0-7851-1613-3) collects:
  - Daredevil 2099 (with Karl Moline and Mike Perkins, one-shot, 2004)
  - Black Panther 2099 (with Kyle Hotz, one-shot, 2004)
  - Inhumans 2099 (with Cliff Rathburn, one-shot, 2004)
  - The Punisher 2099 (with Pop Mhan, one-shot, 2004)
  - Mutant 2099 (with Khary Randolph, one-shot, 2004)
- Jubilee #1–6 (with Derec Donovan, Marvel Age, 2004) collected as Jubilee by Robert Kirkman (tpb, 144 pages, 2011, ISBN 0-7851-5861-8)
- Marvel Team-Up vol. 3 (with Scott Kolins, Jeff Johnson (#8), Paco Medina, Cory Walker (#14 and 19), Andy Kuhn and Roger Cruz (#23), 2004–2006) collected as:
  - The Golden Child (collects #1–6, tpb, 144 pages, 2005, ISBN 0-7851-1595-1)
  - Master of the Ring (collects #7–13, tpb, 176 pages, 2005, ISBN 0-7851-1596-X)
  - League of Losers (collects #14–18, tpb, 120 pages, 2006, ISBN 0-7851-1946-9)
  - Freedom Ring (collects #19–25, tpb, 168 pages, 2007, ISBN 0-7851-1990-6)
- Fantastic Four: Foes #1–6 (with Cliff Rathburn, 2005) collected as Fantastic Four: Foes (tpb, 144 pages, 2005, ISBN 0-7851-1662-1)
- The New Avengers and X-Men: America Supports You: "Time Trouble" (with Alex Chung and Scott Hepburn, one-shot, 2006)
- Amazing Fantasy vol. 2 #15: "Monstro" (with Khary Randolph, anthology, 2006)
- Marvel Zomnibus (hc, 1,200 pages, 2012, ISBN 0-7851-4026-3) includes:
  - Marvel Zombies #1–5 (with Sean Phillips, 2006) also collected as Marvel Zombies (hc, 136 pages, 2006, ISBN 0-7851-2277-X; tpb, 2007, ISBN 0-7851-2014-9)
  - Marvel Zombies: Dead Days (with Sean Phillips, one-shot, 2007) also collected in Marvel Zombies: Dead Days (hc, 272 pages, 2008, ISBN 0-7851-3232-5; tpb, 2009, ISBN 0-7851-3563-4)
  - Marvel Zombies 2 #1–5 (with Sean Phillips, 2007–2008) also collected as Marvel Zombies 2 (hc, 128 pages, 2008, ISBN 0-7851-2545-0; tpb, 2009, ISBN 0-7851-2546-9)
- What If...? (featuring Thor): "What If Thor was the Herald of Galactus?" (with Michael Avon Oeming, one-shot, 2006) collected in What If: Mirror Mirror (tpb, 152 pages, 2006, ISBN 0-7851-1902-7)
- Ultimate X-Men (with Tom Raney, Ben Oliver, Salvador Larroca, Yanick Paquette, Pascal Alixe (#82–83) and Harvey Tolibao (#93), 2006–2008) collected as:
  - Volume 7 (collects #66–74 and Annual #2, hc, 256 pages, 2007, ISBN 0-7851-2605-8)
  - Volume 8 (collects #75–88, hc, 352 pages, 2008, ISBN 0-7851-3080-2)
  - Volume 9 (includes #89–93, hc, 332 pages, 2009, ISBN 0-7851-3779-3)
- Ant-Man:
  - Civil War: Choosing Sides: "Conscientous Objector" (with Phil Hester, anthology one-shot, 2006) collected in Civil War: Marvel Universe (tpb, 136 pages, 2007, ISBN 0-7851-2470-5)
  - The Irredeemable Ant-Man #1–12 (with Phil Hester and Cory Walker (#7–8), 2006–2007) collected as The Irredeemable Ant-Man (tpb, 272 pages, 2009, ISBN 0-7851-4086-7)
- Killraven vol. 2 (with Rob Liefeld, unreleased 5-issue limited series — initially announced for 2008; still a "work in progress" in 2009; reportedly completed in 2011)
- The Destroyer #1–5 (with Cory Walker, Marvel MAX, 2009) collected as The Destroyer (hc, 120 pages, 2009, ISBN 0-7851-4246-0; tpb, 2010, ISBN 0-7851-3346-1)
- X-Force vol. 3 Annual #1 (with Jason Pearson, 2010) collected in X-Force by Craig Kyle and Chris Yost Volume 1 (tpb, 384 pages, 2014, ISBN 0-7851-8966-1)

== Other publishers ==
Titles published by various American publishers include:

- Dark Horse:
  - 9-11 Volume 1 (untitled one-page story, with Tony Moore, anthology graphic novel, 196 pages, 2002, ISBN 1-56389-881-0)
  - Star Wars Tales #19: "The Rebel Club" (as letterer; written and drawn by Scott Kurtz, anthology, 2004) collected in Star Wars Tales Volume 5 (tpb, 248 pages, 2005, ISBN 1-59307-286-4)
- Sky Ape: All the Heroes (two-page sequence leading in to an unreleased Battle Pope/Sky Ape crossover, with Tony Moore, graphic novel, 56 pages, AiT/Planet Lar, 2003, ISBN 1-932051-08-2)
- MVCreations (as an imprint of CrossGen):
  - Masters of the Universe:
    - Masters of the Universe: Icons of Evil series of one-shots, collected as Masters of the Universe: Icons of Evil (tpb, 176 pages, 2004, ISBN 0-9748008-0-5)
      - Scripted by Kirkman from plots by Kirkman, Val Staples and Ian Richter; the first release in the series, Beastman, was published under Image:
        - Masters of the Universe — Icons of Evil: Mer-Man (with E. J. Su, 2003)
        - Masters of the Universe — Icons of Evil: Trapjaw (with Carlo Pagulayan, 2003)
        - Masters of the Universe — Icons of Evil: Tri-Klops (with Diogenes Neves, Antony Bilal, Renato Arlem, Joseph Domingo and Miguel Montenegro, 2003)
    - Masters of the Universe: Dream Halloween: "The Power of Fear" (as letterer; written by Val Staples, drawn by Emiliano Santalucia, one-shot, 2003)
  - Tales of the Realm #1–5 (with Matt Tyree, 2003–2004) collected as Tales of the Realm (tpb, 144 pages, 2004, ISBN 1-58240-394-5)
  - Space Ace #1–3 (with Paul Borges and Euclides Miyaura + Cid Norbert (#3), 2003)
    - Kirkman completed the script for issue #4 and plotted issues #5–6 before the series' cancellation.
    - In 2009, Arcana reprinted and continued the series with #4–6 drawn by Maria Cristina Francisco and #5–6 scripted by Ryan Foley.
- Arcade:
  - Youngblood: Imperial #1– (with Marat Mychaels, 2004)
  - Supreme Sacrifice (with Jon Malin and Rob Liefeld, one-shot, 2006)
- Magdalena/Vampirella (with Francis Manapul, one-shot, co-published by Harris and Top Cow, 2004)
- Tales of Army of Darkness: "Weekend Off" (with Ryan Ottley, anthology one-shot, Dynamite, 2006)
- The Most Important Comic Book on Earth: "A Glimpse" (with Charlie Adlard, anthology graphic novel, 352 pages, DK, 2021, ISBN 0-7440-4282-8)

=== Novels ===
Kirkman has co-written a series of prose The Walking Dead novels with writer Jay Bonansinga:

- The Walking Dead: Rise of the Governor (hc, 320 pages, Thomas Dunne Books, October 2011, ISBN 0-312-54773-0; sc, June 2012, ISBN 1-250-00839-5)
- The Walking Dead: The Road to Woodbury (hc, 288 pages, Thomas Dunne Books, October 2012, ISBN 0-312-54774-9; sc, June 2013, ISBN 1-250-02888-4)
- The Walking Dead: The Fall of the Governor – Part I (hc, 256 pages, Thomas Dunne Books, October 2013, ISBN 0-312-54817-6; sc, June 2014, ISBN 1-250-04877-X)
- The Walking Dead: The Fall of the Governor – Part II (hc, 288 pages, Thomas Dunne Books, March 2014, ISBN 1-250-05201-7; sc, March 2015, ISBN 1-4472-6682-X)
- The Walking Dead: Rise of the Governor and the Road to Woodbury (sc, 624 pages, Thomas Dunne Books, November 2014, ISBN 1-250-07309-X)
- The Walking Dead: The Fall of the Governor – Parts I and II (sc, 544 pages, Thomas Dunne Books, November 2014, ISBN 1-250-07310-3)
