= List of The Walking Dead (comics) characters =

From left to right: Siddiq, Heath, Andrea, Aaron, Maggie Greene, Hershel Greene II, Paul Monroe, Magna, Connie, Luke, Kelly, Yumiko, Rick Grimes, Negan, Carl Grimes, Eugene Porter, Rosita Espinosa, and Olivia.

The following is a list of characters from The Walking Dead comic book series, created by Robert Kirkman. Plot structure and characterization between the comic and television series can be similar, derivative, or in many cases almost entirely unrelated.

== Character timelines ==
Character is alive and present in volume
Character is alive but not present in volume
Character dies in volume
Character is a walker or their status is otherwise unknown
Character appears in flashback or hallucination
Character is deceased and/or not present in volume

=== Atlanta arc (volumes 1–2) ===
The first two volumes of The Walking Dead focus on Rick Grimes, who journeys from Grant County, Kentucky to find his family, as well as survivors of a camp in Atlanta, Georgia, and the Greene Family Farm on its outskirts. They were adapted into the first and second seasons of The Walking Dead.

Character	Atlanta		Prison						Road to Washington			Alexandria				Negan						Whisperers								The Commonwealth		
Character	1	2	3	4	5	6	7	8	9	10	11	12	13	14	15	16	17	18	19	20	21	22	23	24	25	26	27	28	29	30	31	32
Grant County, Kentucky
Rick Grimes																																
Shane Walsh																																
Lori Grimes																																
Carl Grimes																																
Duane Jones																																
Morgan Jones																																
Atlanta, Georgia
Glenn Rhee																																
Andrea																																
Sophia																																
Dale																																
Carol																																
Donna																																
Allen																																
Ben & Billy																																
Amy																																
Jim																																
Atlanta Outskirts
Tyreese																																
Julie																																
Chris																																
Greene Farm
Otis																																
Maggie Greene																																
Hershel Greene																																
Lacey Greene																																
Arnold Greene																																
Billy Greene																																
Rachel & Susie Greene																																
Patricia																																

=== Prison arc (volumes 3–8) ===
Volumes three to eight of The Walking Dead centre around the survivors living in the Meriwether County Correctional Facility, an abandoned prison, amid tensions with Woodbury, a neighbouring community run by The Governor. They were adapted into seasons three and four of The Walking Dead.

Character	Atlanta		Prison						Road to Washington			Alexandria				Negan						Whisperers								The Commonwealth		
Character	1	2	3	4	5	6	7	8	9	10	11	12	13	14	15	16	17	18	19	20	21	22	23	24	25	26	27	28	29	30	31	32
Meriwether County Correctional Facility
Thomas Richards																																
Dexter																																
Andrew																																
Axel																																
Michonne Hawthorne																																
Judith Grimes	not born yet	not born yet	not born yet	not born yet	not born yet	not born yet																										
Woodbury, Georgia
Caeser Martinez																																
The Governor																																
Gabe Harris																																
Bruce Cooper																																
Dr. Stevens																																
Alice Warren																																
Bob Stookey																																
Penny Blake																																
Lilly Caul																																

=== Road to Washington arc (volumes 9–11) ===
Volumes nine to eleven of The Walking Dead depict the survivors on the road to Washington, and their encounters with the Marauders and the cannibalistic Hunters. They were adapted into seasons four and five of The Walking Dead.

Character	Atlanta		Prison						Road to Washington			Alexandria				Negan						Whisperers								The Commonwealth		
Character	1	2	3	4	5	6	7	8	9	10	11	12	13	14	15	16	17	18	19	20	21	22	23	24	25	26	27	28	29	30	31	32
Abraham's Army
Abraham Ford																																
Rosita Espinosa																																
Eugene Porter																																
Church Survivors
Gabriel Stokes																																
The Hunters
Chris																																

=== Alexandria arc (volumes 12–15) ===
Volumes twelve to fifteen of The Walking Dead depict the survivors adjusting to life living in the Alexandria Safe-Zone, Virginia, six miles south from Washington. They were adapted into seasons five and six of The Walking Dead.

Character	Atlanta		Prison						Road to Washington			Alexandria				Negan						Whisperers								The Commonwealth		
Character	1	2	3	4	5	6	7	8	9	10	11	12	13	14	15	16	17	18	19	20	21	22	23	24	25	26	27	28	29	30	31	32
Alexandria Safe-Zone
Aaron																																
Eric																																
Heath																																
Scott																																
Tobin																																
Bruce																																
Douglas Monroe																																
Regina Monroe																																
Olivia																																
Nicholas																																
Paula																																
Mikey																																
Josh																																
Dr. Denise Cloyd																																
Spencer Monroe																																
Pete Anderson																																
Ron Anderson																																
Jessie Anderson																																
Barbara																																
Holly																																
Julia																																
Vincent																																
The Scavengers
Derek																																

=== Negan arc (volumes 16–21) ===
Volumes sixteen to twenty-one of The Walking Dead centre around the Alexandria survivors building alliances with neighbouring communities Hilltop Colony and the Kingdom, to liberate themselves from Negan and the Saviours at the Sanctuary. They were adapted into seasons six, seven and eight of The Walking Dead.

Character	Atlanta		Prison						Road to Washington			Alexandria				Negan						Whisperers								The Commonwealth		
Character	1	2	3	4	5	6	7	8	9	10	11	12	13	14	15	16	17	18	19	20	21	22	23	24	25	26	27	28	29	30	31	32
Hilltop Colony
Paul "Jesus" Monroe																																
Gregory																																
Kal																																
Eduardo																																
Brianna																																
Samuel																																
Earl Sutton																																
Dr. Harlan Carson																																
Johnny																																
Alex																																
Oscar																																
The Sanctuary
Negan																																
Dwight																																
John																																
Tara																																
Carson																																
Sherry																																
Amber																																
Mark																																
The Kingdom
Ezekiel																																
Alexandra Safe-Zone
Erin																																

=== Whisperers arc (volumes 22–29) ===
Volumes twenty-two to twenty-nine of The Walking Dead centre around the survivors attempting to build and maintain their civilised communities, as they wage war with a new threat, the Whisperers. They were adapted into seasons nine and ten of The Walking Dead.

Character	Atlanta		Prison						Road to Washington			Alexandria				Negan						Whisperers								The Commonwealth		
Character	1	2	3	4	5	6	7	8	9	10	11	12	13	14	15	16	17	18	19	20	21	22	23	24	25	26	27	28	29	30	31	32
Richmond, Virginia
Magna																																
Luke																																
Yumiko																																
Kelly																																
Connie																																
Alexandria Safe-Zone
Annie																																
Siddiq																																
Anna																																
Darius																																
Hilltop Colony
Dante																																
Hershel Greene II	not born yet	not born yet	not born yet	not born yet	not born yet	not born yet	not born yet	not born yet	not born yet	not born yet	not born yet	not born yet	not born yet	not born yet	not born yet	not born yet	not born yet	not born yet	not born yet	not born yet	not born yet											
Rolland																																
Marco																																
Ken																																
Brandon Rose																																
Morton Rose																																
Tammy Rose																																
The Whisperers
Alpha																																
Lydia																																
Beta																																
Joshua																																
Mike																																
Oceanside
Pete																																
The Sanctuary
Laura																																
The Commonwealth
Stephanie																																
The Kingdom
William																																
Zachary																																
Pittsburgh, Pennsylvania
Juanita "Princess" Sanchez																																

=== The Commonwealth arc (volumes 30–32) ===
Volumes thirty to thirty-two of The Walking Dead centre around the survivors adjusting to life under the Commonwealth in Ohio. They were adapted into season eleven of The Walking Dead.

Character	Atlanta		Prison						Road to Washington			Alexandria				Negan						Whisperers								The Commonwealth		
Character	1	2	3	4	5	6	7	8	9	10	11	12	13	14	15	16	17	18	19	20	21	22	23	24	25	26	27	28	29	30	31	32
The Commonwealth
Frost																																
Samuels																																
Lance Hornsby																																
George																																
Rufus																																
Maxwell Hawkins																																
Pamela Milton																																
Elodie Hawthorne																																
Sebastian Milton																																
Kayla																																
Mercer																																
Jerome																																
Anthony Keith																																
Kapoor																																
Greenville
Cloris																																

== Grimes family ==
=== Rick Grimes ===
Rick is the group's de facto leader. He is Lori's husband and Carl's father. Before the zombie apocalypse, Rick is a sheriff's deputy in the small town of Cynthiana, Kentucky. While in a shootout against an escaped convict with his partner and best friend, Shane Walsh, Rick is wounded and subsequently awakens from a coma some time later. After finding his family in Atlanta camp, Rick quickly assumes the role of the leader of the survivor community. As the story progresses, Rick adopts a more dark and assertive nature. He lost his wife and daughter during the fall of the prison. Lori's death leaves Rick an emotional wreck. Rick suffers frightening hallucinations of her, and for a while seems to hear conversations with her on an old phone. For the heavy loss of lives that have occurred, Rick constantly blames himself. At the same time, he never backs away from a difficult decision affecting his community. Rick is very protective of Carl, while at the same time he feels detached from Carl's now bleak outlook of the world. Eventually Rick begins a romantic relationship with Andrea in Alexandria. Rick is the leader of the Alexandria survivors community. As the war with Negan escalates, Negan forces Dwight to shoot Rick with a bolt (possibly with walker blood on it to infect Rick with the walker-virus), but as Rick does not turn, Dwight is proven a trustworthy ally and not a surreptitious foe. He takes Negan captive and ends the war. Two years later, he is still leading the Safe-Zone and dating Andrea. After The Whisperers attack the Safe-Zone during the fair, Rick's leadership is questioned. To divert this, Rick manages to move the survivors anger towards The Whisperers through propaganda and army campaigns. Rick begins to trust Negan after the latter brings Alpha's head to him. Rick then kills Sherry after the Savior's betray his alliance, and then he learns that Andrea was bitten and is dying, causing him great grief. Rick is killed after Sebastian Milton shoots him multiple times and leaves him for dead. Carl later finds his father's reanimated body and puts him down.

- Series Lifespan: #1–192

=== Lori Grimes ===
Lori is Rick's wife and Carl and Judith Grimes' mother. During the Governor's second attack on the prison, she is shot by Lilly while holding Judith, whom she crushes after falling.

- Series Lifespan: #2–48

=== Carl Grimes ===
Carl is the son of Rick and Lori as well as Judith's elder brother. Carl begins as a normal and innocent child, but as the events of the new world order force him to grow up, he becomes colder and competently makes sometimes tough decisions for the good of his group of friends. When the group arrives at the prison, Carl starts dating Carol's daughter Sophia. However, their relationship ends as they part ways during the conflict with Negan. During an invasion by walkers at the Alexandria Safe-Zone, he is accidentally shot in the eye and loses it. As a teenager, Carl resides at the Hilltop Colony as a blacksmith apprentice but still remains close friends with Sophia, while contacting and later forming a sexual relationship with Whisperer, Lydia. He is currently back at Alexandria, with the rest of the survivors of the walker attack on the Hilltop. Since his father's death, Carl is the last remaining member of the Grimes family.

- Series Lifespan: #2–193

=== Judith Grimes ===
Judith is the newborn daughter of Lori Grimes and younger sister to Carl. Though Rick is acknowledged as her father, it is strongly implied that Shane is her biological father. During the Governor's second attack on the prison, Lori is shot by Lilly while holding Judith, and Lori falls, crushing Judith.

- Series Lifespan: #39–48

=== Andrea/Andrea Grimes ===
Andrea was one of the comic's longest-living survivors, alongside Rick, Carl, Maggie and Sophia Peletier. Andrea worked as a clerk for a law firm before the zombie apocalypse, a job which she says she hated. She is shown to be one of the greatest rifle shooters in the Walking Dead universe, known for sniping at foes of the group whether they are human or zombies. After having a relationship with Dale in the prison, she is later in a relationship with Rick at the Alexandria Safe-Zone after Dale's death. She acts as a motherly figure to Carl and plays an important role in running the Safe-Zone, often seen as a Vice President figure. Andrea was bitten by a walker whilst saving Eugene from the herd that attacked Alexandria. She dies in her room with Rick, and various members of Alexandria and the Hilltop say goodbye to her before she dies.

- Series Lifespan: #2–167

=== Andrea Grimes ===
Andrea is the daughter of Carl and Sophia, who rekindle their relationship and eventually get married. Sophia later gives birth to a baby girl, whom they name after Carl's stepmother Andrea Grimes.

- Series Lifespan: #193

== Jones family ==
=== Duane Jones ===
Duane Jones was a young boy hiding out with his father, Morgan, in various houses in Rick's neighborhood, attempting to ride out the zombie apocalypse. After meeting Rick and being provided with weapons from the police station, Morgan and Duane part ways with Rick, potentially to meet again some day. Much later, at Christmas, Morgan and Duane are seen alive and well, living in a cabin on a snowy mountain. Later still, Rick encounters the two, but while Morgan is alive, Duane has turned. Morgan now joins Rick, but leaves his reanimated son to roam freely within the house.

- Series Lifespan: #1–59

=== Morgan Jones ===
Morgan was the devoted father of Duane Jones struggling to get over the recent death of his wife. He and his son seek refuge in Rick's hometown after the outbreak occurs. He is the first living person Rick encounters after waking up. He informs Rick of the outbreak and what has been happening within the world the past couple months. Sometime within the following weeks/months, Duane falls prey to the walkers and gets turned. Morgan, unable to cope with the death of his son, resorts to locking Duane in the house with chains. Later Rick takes him in as one of his community. He develops an attraction and consequently a complicated relationship with Michonne. While helping fight off zombies with Michonne, Rick, and the others, he is caught off guard and bitten on the arm by a walker. Michonne chops off Morgan's arm, and from there he is left bedridden. He is shortly thereafter killed by Michonne before he has the chance to re-animate.

- Series Lifespan: #1–83

== Atlanta survivor camp ==
=== Allen ===
Allen was the big-bearded husband of Donna and father of twins Billy and Ben. Before the dead rose, Allen was a shoe salesman gradually falling into debt. After the dead rose, Allen and his family joined the group of survivors encamped on the outer limits of Atlanta. Upon leaving, Allen suffered terribly when Donna was killed by zombies, sending him into a downward emotional spiral that he never truly recovers from. He confides in Rick and the two became close friends. Andrea tried to offer him comfort, due to her similar loss of her sister, but, Allen rejected her sympathy and maintained a bitter relationship with her. With time, he gradually gained a sense of acceptance, but this new-found peace was short-lived; Allen was bitten on the foot by a zombie, while helping the others clear out the remaining areas of the prison the group was staying in. In an effort to contain the infection, Rick made a violent and botched attempt at amputation. After a long struggle for survival against blood loss, and serious infections setting in, Allen died. After being shot in the head by Rick before he could reanimate, his body was buried outside the prison.

- Series Lifespan: #3–23

=== Amy ===
Amy was Andrea's younger sister. They join the survivor group on the outskirts of Atlanta. Amy is bitten by a zombie in the opening stages of a zombie attack on their exposed camp. She dies of the bite, and Andrea shoots her in the head to prevent reanimation and buries her in the nearby forest.

- Series Lifespan: #3–5

=== Donna ===
Donna was the wife of Allen and mother of twins Billy and Ben. She is strong-willed, loving and caring to her family. Before the events of the series, Donna made all the big decisions in her relationship with her husband, while leaving the financial responsibilities with Allen. After the dead rise, Donna and her family join the group of survivors encamped on the outer limits of Atlanta, where she makes a point of resenting that the women of the group (herself, Carol and Lori) have to take care of most of the group's domestic chores (e.g. laundry). Shortly after, when the group attempts to settle at Wiltshire Estates, Donna is killed by a zombie and her body devoured by more of the undead, leaving Allen permanently devastated.

- Series Lifespan: #3–9

=== Ben ===
Ben was Allen and Donna's twin son. He is unofficially adopted by Dale and Andrea after their parents die. He does not seem to understand what is happening in the world as it is and believes zombies to be people too. On the road to D.C., Ben brutally slaughters Billy, convinced that he will come back. The group debates killing Ben to protect themselves, but takes no immediate action. In the night, Carl sneaks into the van where Ben is locked up, and executes him. Billy and Ben are buried side by side.

- Series Lifespan: #3–61

=== Billy ===
Billy was Allen and Donna's twin son. He is unofficially adopted by Dale and Andrea after their parents die. On the road to D.C., Billy is brutally slaughtered by Ben, who is convinced that Billy will come back. Andrea and Dale are devastated by his loss.

- Series Lifespan: #3–61

=== Dale ===
Dale was shown to be the wisest member of the survivor group. Without telling the group he had been bitten, Dale goes off to die but is knocked out by the Hunters who then cook and eat his leg. After Rick's group finds and kills the hunters, they take Dale back to the church. After he dies, he is shot by Andrea to prevent reanimation and his body is burned. Andrea keeps and wears Dale's fishing hat which she uses to talk to him.

- Series Lifespan: #3–66

=== Jim ===
Jim joins the survivor group after his entire family is killed by zombies. During a zombie attack on the group, Jim, failing to kill one with his gun, grapples with a zombie and violently smashes its head in, his rage over his family's death driving him momentarily insane. After coming to his senses, he, and the rest of the group realize that he has been bitten on his arm. Jim is left under a tree on the outskirts of Atlanta, in the hopes that, upon reanimating, he can be reunited with the undead members of his family that may still exist.

- Series Lifespan: #3–6

=== Carol ===
Carol was a 24-year-old housewife and was the mother of Sophia. She is portrayed as a fragile woman, relying on others for emotional and physical support. She becomes Tyreese's girlfriend until he cheats on her with Michonne, which contributes to her continuing psychological breakdown. She dies in the prison, feeding herself to a walker tied up for medical observation after convincing herself that the walker wanted to be her friend. This comes after Tyreese's infidelity and Rick and Lori's rejection of a polyamorous relationship. Her daughter is taken in by Glenn and Maggie.

- Series Lifespan: #3–42

=== Sophia ===
Sophia is the daughter of Carol and adopted daughter of Maggie, and the longest running female character in the series. Early in the series she develops a friendship and later a relationship with Carl until they are separated within the two different communities of Alexandria and the Hilltop 22 miles apart. After Carol dies at the prison, Sophia pretends that Maggie and Glenn are her real parents, until she admits she is aware of Carol, and was simply repressing the bad memories around her suicide attempts. Four years into the apocalypse, and two years after the war with Negan, Sophia and Carl reunite as he becomes a blacksmith apprentice at the Hilltop, and becomes skilled in fighting, She is brutally beaten by two bullies after she tries to stop them from harming another child, before Carl defends her and leaves them in a critical condition.

- Series Lifespan: #2–193

=== Glenn ===
Glenn was Maggie's boyfriend (later husband). Glenn delivered pizzas in Atlanta before the events of the comic which gave him the skills to make supply runs. On one of these runs, he found Rick and brought him back to the group, reuniting him with his family. He is a key member of Rick's group throughout his life, often acting as a supply runner. He also makes a very close friend named Heath after the group comes to Alexandria. He planned to live with Maggie at the Hilltop Colony, So Maggie, Sophia, and their baby could be safe. He is beaten to death with a baseball bat by Negan.

- Series Lifespan: #2–100

=== Shane ===
Shane Walsh was a police officer and longtime friend of Rick Grimes. After Rick is shot and put into a coma, and the zombie outbreak occurs, he rescues Rick's family and leads a group of survivors, becoming romantically involved with Rick's wife, Lori. When Rick returns to his family alive, Shane grows increasingly jealous of their relationship, as well as Rick's role in the group. He is shot in the neck by Carl and is later put down by Rick.

- Series Lifespan: #1–6, #7 (flashback), #15 (as a zombie), #37 (flashback)

== Tyreese's group ==
=== Chris ===
Chris was a disturbed, sixteen-year-old boyfriend of Julie, living with her and her father, Tyreese before the zombie crisis begins. The three eventually join Rick's group in Atlanta's outskirts, and move with them from Wiltshire Estates to the prison. Unbeknownst to the others, Chris exhorts Julie into a youthfully idealistic suicide pact, and haphazardly executes it one night, in the prison, shooting her. Julie reanimates in her father's arms and Chris shoots her a second time. Tyreese, in furious rage chokes Chris to death, then beats his reanimated corpse until he is nothing but pulverized pieces, which he then burns. Tyreese later confesses his enraged manslaughter to Rick.

- Series Lifespan: #7–15

=== Julie ===
Julie was Tyreese's teenage daughter. She is shown to be affectionate to both her father and boyfriend. The end of the world has not stopped her from seeking independence where she can find it. During the initial stages of clearing out the penitentiary, she and Chris act as babysitters. Once settled, after having sex for the first time with Chris, she carries out an ill-fated suicide pact with her boyfriend. She soon reanimates in Tyreese's arms, and almost kills her father before being fatally shot by Chris again.

- Series Lifespan: #7–14, #15 (as a zombie)

=== Tyreese ===
Tyreese was shown to be a devoted father as well as an able-bodied fighter and leadership figure to those around him. However, he is also a very flawed individual, suffering from emotional fragility. Despite this, he is greatly admired by his fellow survivors and is a role model to Carl, while acting as Rick's right-hand man (despite often being conflicted with him on several issues). He is killed by The Governor outside the prison, being decapitated with Michonne's sword.

- Series Lifespan: #7–46, #49 (as a zombie), #72 (flashback), #75 (canon)

== Greene family farm ==
=== Arnold Greene ===
Arnold was Hershel's second son. He is shown as loyal and reliable to his father. He is bitten by his brother, Shawn, who had become a zombie and has been kept locked inside the family's barn. He is shot by a distraught Hershel to prevent reanimation.

- Series Lifespan: #10–11

=== Billy Greene ===
Billy was Hershel's youngest son. Depicted as in his teens, brash and rebellious, he acts as one of the best shots of the group, second only to Andrea. Billy ends up having a one-night stand with Carol before she commits suicide, which causes him to feel guilt. He is killed in the final stages of the assault on the prison by the Woodbury Army; his death leads his father to allow himself to die as well.

- Series Lifespan: #10–48

=== Hershel Greene ===
Hershel was the patriarch of the Greene family and owner of the farm where Rick's group are invited to stay after Carl is shot. He later joins up with Rick's group at the prison after the farm becomes too unsafe only to be killed during the Governor's second attack on the prison.

- Series Lifespan: #10–48

=== Lacey Greene ===
Lacey was Hershel's eldest daughter. She is shown as sarcastic and weary of her father. Lacey shared her love of reading with Carol. She is killed by the zombies that were kept in the family's barn while attempting to save Arnold. She is a sister of Maggie

- Series Lifespan: #10–11

=== Maggie Greene ===
Maggie is Hershel Greene's tomboyish second oldest daughter and Glenn's lover. She eventually becomes Glenn's wife and later widow, and takes the role of being a surrogate mother to Sophia Peletier following the suicide of the girl's biological mother, Carol Peletier. She soon discovers she is pregnant while living at the Alexandria Safe-Zone in Washington DC. After Glenn's death, she moves with Sophia to the Hilltop Colony. She successfully overthrows Gregory as leader, outing him as a coward for siding with the man who murdered Glenn, only caring for his own safety. Eventually she becomes the de facto leader of the community as she moves reinforcements to save the civilians of Alexandria in the war against the Saviours during the bombings. Two years after the war, she remains a strong and capable leader, while also taking care of her two-year-old son, Hershel Greene II She continues to come into conflict with Gregory, who orchestrates a plan to kill her with other parents who disagree with her actions towards their sons' injuries after Carl Grimes had beaten them to save Sophia. Gregory manages to poison Maggie as she is dealing with one of the Whisperer captives, Lydia. The Hilltop is attacked during the Whisperer War arc, and Maggie is forced to lead the survivors to Alexandria.

- Series Lifespan: #10–193

=== Rachel Greene ===
Rachel was one of Hershel's youngest twin daughters. Along with her sister, she is decapitated by Thomas when alone in the prison barbershop.

- Series Lifespan: #10–15, #16 (as zombies)

=== Susie Greene ===
Susie was one of Hershel's youngest twin daughters. Along with her sister, she is decapitated by Thomas when alone in the prison barbershop.

- Series Lifespan: #10–15, #16 (as zombies)

=== Shawn Greene ===
Shawn was Hershel's oldest son and the first member of the Greene family to be killed by zombies, as shown in the video game adaptation The Walking Dead: Season One. He is reanimated and locked in Hershel's barn until a cure for the epidemic can be discovered. He eventually escapes the barn and kills his brother Arnold. He is shot by Hershel when Hershel realizes that his son will never again be normal.

- Series Lifespan: #11 (as a zombie)

=== Otis ===
Otis was the boyfriend of Patricia and a neighbor of Hershel Greene. He accidentally shoots and almost kills Carl while out hunting for a deer. Otis remains at the farm while the Greenes leave to join Rick at the prison. Otis later follows, and is saved from zombies by the newly arrived Michonne. He rejoins the group (though ends his relationship with Patricia after learning of her part in Dexter's attempted coup). Later, when the prison is temporarily overrun by zombies, Otis is attacked by zombies and killed. When Rick and his group return from Woodbury, Otis has turned into a walker. Rick shoots him in the head. It is briefly hinted that he is racist.

- Series Lifespan: #9–30, #35 (as a zombie)

=== Patricia ===
Patricia was Otis' incredibly naïve girlfriend. After Thomas kills Hershel's twin daughters, Patricia attempts to free him so the other survivors don't kill him. Thomas almost kills her soon afterward, but Patricia manages to fight him off until Maggie arrives and shoots him. Rick is wary of allowing Patricia to stay with the group but decides she is ultimately harmless. Her naiveté allows the inmates of the prison to convince her to help them take back the prison from Rick, though their plan is thwarted after Dexter is killed. Patricia then becomes an outcast amongst the survivors (mainly Maggie & Hershel), but regains acceptance by saving Rick's life via a blood transfusion before the attack on the prison. She is shot and killed by a member of Woodbury during the final assault on the prison.

- Series Lifespan: #10–48

== The Prisoners ==
=== Andrew ===
Andrew was a dreadlocked former drug user who believes God sent the zombie apocalypse to help him "get clean". He is of African-American background. He has a relationship with Dexter, apparently in love with him, probably due to the amount of time spent locked up alone with him and the two other convicts. When Dexter is accused of murder, he organizes Andrew to find a way into the previously unexplored Block A and gather up the guards riot gear to take over the prison. After Dexter's death, he is extremely distraught; he subsequently flees the prison during the time Michonne and Otis arrive. His fate remains unclear. Later on, the writer stated that Andrew is probably deceased. In the novel The Fall of the Governor it is revealed that Andrew has turned into a zombie. Shortly afterwards he is shot by Lilly Caul.

- Series Lifespan: #13–19

=== Axel ===
Axel was described as a grizzled old white biker imprisoned for armed robbery. When Dexter tries to force the survivors out of the prison, Axel stands up for them. Being the only of the four convicts to remain with the survivors over the majority of the story, he eventually finds their trust through hard work and earnest commitment. He has a brief relationship with Patricia after being shot in the arm during the first prison assault. After helping the survivors set up defenses, he is shot in the head, an early casualty of the second prison assault.

- Series Lifespan: #13–47, #75 (canon)

=== Dexter ===
Dexter was a towering, physically intimidating African-American inmate at the prison where the group takes residence. Convicted of murdering his wife and her lover, whom he states, "were the last". He ironically trusts the other survivors far less than they trust him. He has a covert relationship with Andrew, but is purely in said relationship for sex. After the murders of the Greene twins, Lori leads the group to wrongly lock him up on account of being the only convict known to murder. After Thomas is revealed to be responsible and not receiving any apology, he loses his patience and orders Andrew to scavenge the prison's riot gear. Amidst the confusion with Thomas, Dexter gathers Andrew and a defecting Patricia with their new riot gear to force out the survivors. He is soon after killed discreetly in a skirmish against zombies by Rick, who covers it up as a friendly fire mistake.

- Series Lifespan: #13–19

=== Thomas Richards ===
Thomas was a nerdy man who claims to be in federal prison for tax evasion (which he claims is not his fault). He is actually a homicidal lunatic who murders two of Hershel's daughters by decapitation and attempts to murder Andrea before he is beaten senseless by an enraged Rick. Patricia attempts to free him so the other survivors would not hang him, nearly getting herself killed in the process. He is later shot repeatedly by Maggie Greene after his attempted escape. His deceased body is thrown to the zombie hordes outside of the prison.

- Series Lifespan: #13–18

== Michonne's group ==
=== Michonne ===
Michonne is a katana-wielding survivor who saves the life of Otis and thereafter joins Rick's group at the prison. Over the course of the series, she finds herself repressed and unhappy over the deaths of her loved ones, believing she doesn't deserve any happiness or a chance to start over, due to the pain of leaving her daughters behind, assuming they've been killed along with her ex-husband, Dominic. She journeys to Alexandria with the group and after two years, returns from a long sea voyage. She is the supposed leader of The Kingdom after the death of Ezekiel, but is currently helping at the Hilltop Colony after delivering a near-dead Aaron.

- Series Lifespan: #19–193

=== Mike ===
Mike was the reanimated boyfriend of Michonne who is used for camouflage with the other zombies. In the Michonne special, it is revealed that Mike and Terry met up with Michonne before staying in a secluded house where a zombie tried to gain entry and bit him in the arm. He is decapitated by Michonne when she gains entry into the prison, but she still speaks to him nonetheless.

=== Terry ===
Terry was the best friend of Michonne's boyfriend, Mike.

== Woodbury ==
- Alice, previously an interior design student, is a fast learner and, while living in Woodbury, is Dr. Stevens' assistant. She chooses to leave Woodbury with Rick and thereafter becomes the de facto physician of Rick's group and helps deliver Lori's baby. While attempting to cover Rick and Lori in their escape, she is personally killed by a vengeful Governor during the assault on the prison.
  Series Lifespan: #29–48
- Bob Stookey is the local town drunk of Woodbury. Forty years prior to the series, he was supposedly an army medic. His minor role expands significantly when he saves the Governor's life. He is called upon by Gabe and Bruce to save the Governor when Alice and Dr. Stevens, the only town medics have fled and Michonne almost tortures the Governor to death. After a slow recovery, the Governor personally asks him to watch over his zombie daughter until the Woodbury army returns from killing the prison survivors. In The Walking Dead: The Fall of the Governor, it is revealed that Bob is alive and continues to live in Woodbury along with Lilly Caul and the group of refugees she has taken in.
  Series Lifespan: #29–43
- Lilly Caul is an angry brunette woman from Woodbury who participated in the prison assault. Before Woodbury, she was a survivor with her father, who sacrificed himself to save her.
  Lilly's back story is told in the novel The Walking Dead: The Road to Woodbury.
  She is ordered by the Governor to kill Lori who is protecting baby Judith. After shooting them, she discovers that the Governor forced her to kill a baby, and she becomes extremely distraught. When a large crowd of zombies breaks through into the prison yard, Lilly kills the Governor while he's gathering them up, and she throws his body to the hordes while attempting to lead the remnant of the Woodbury survivors into the prison. The prison becomes overrun with zombies, but it is ultimately unknown what becomes of any of them. Robert Kirkman announced that Lilly Caul is not the same character as the Lilly from the Walking Dead video game. Lilly's fate is revealed in The Walking Dead: The Fall of the Governor, where she escapes the prison, leading a small group of surviving Woodbury soldiers back to the safety of the town. She becomes the de facto leader of Woodbury, and takes in a new group of refugees to live in the town with the original residents.
  Series Lifespan: #46–48
- Bruce Cooper was the Governor's right-hand man and one of his best friends. An intimidating, muscular figure, Bruce is tall and bald, but has a short goatee. He is shown as trusting of the Governor to do whatever is necessary for the survival and prosperity of Woodbury, whether it means violence and brutality against those who disagree or run the wrong way with them. He is extremely loyal to the Governor, displaying this trait when he nearly killed Glenn without any hesitancy under orders from the Governor. When Rick's group ventured out to loot Woodbury's Wal-Mart in preparation for an attack, Bruce led a small team to confront them; he is then shot in the neck by Andrea and left for dead. the Governor later discovers him alive, barely, choking on his own blood but managing to give his boss info on the survivor's actions before Phillip shoots him, to prevent reanimation.
  Series Lifespan: #27–43
- Gabriel Harris (or Gabe) was the other enforcer most loyal to the Governor and another one of his closest friends. Gabe is described as a short, stocky man and seems extremely obedient toward the Governor, albeit hesitant and doubtful of some of the Governor's actions. He becomes the Governor's chief confidant after Bruce's death, organising Woodbury against the prison community. He accompanies the Governor almost everywhere. He leads the scout parties and is responsible for discovering the prison's location, as well as the capture and torture of Tyreese, handing him over to the Governor to use as leverage. Gabe is second in command at the latter prison assaults. At the end he becomes weary of the battle, and is shot by Andrea when she returns with the RV.
  Series Lifespan: #27–47
- The Governor (or Philip Blake / Brian Blake) was the leader of Woodbury. He turns on Ricks group and imprisons them. Attempting to find the location of the prison where Rick's group have found shelter he cuts off Rick's hand, mentally tortures Glenn, and has Michonne restrained, stripped and repeatedly raped To learn the location of the prison, the Governor allows the survivors to escape the premises with the help of one of his guards. However, Michonne stays behind and finds her way to his apartment, where she manages to tie him up and torture him with various implements, dismembering and disfiguring him. He loses his right arm, his fingernails, his right ear, his testicles, and his left eye.
  The Governor survives and eventually finds the prison. When the first attack on the prison fails leading to retreat. After a failed later attempt to gain his way into the prison by using Tyreese as a hostage, the Governor crushes the fences with a tank. A bloody massacre ensues killing most of Ricks group forcing the remaining members to flee. After the battle tensions rise within his group, as the ammunition they have remaining is limited and a handful of their own moral consciences come into play. The Governor forces Lilly to kill Judith and Lori, and Lilly, who sees an opportunity to end the Governor's reign, shoots him in the head and kicks him into a group of roamers.
  Series Lifespan: #27–48, #72 (flashback), #75 (canon)
- Penny Blake was the daughter of The Governor who has been zombified by the time the comic starts. The Governor keeps her locked in his apartment and feeds her human remains.
  Series Lifespan: #29–44,
- Caesar Ramon Martinez was the man who conducted Rick, Glenn, and Michonne's entry to Woodbury. He later helped Rick's party escape and fight their way back to the prison. After assisting Rick's party in escaping, Martinez betrays them by sneaking out of the prison to go tell the Governor its location so that he may capture and kill everyone inside. During his run back to Woodbury, Rick runs him down in the RV and then strangles him to death. Caesar's reanimated body is discovered by a Woodbury scouting party, and his head is brought back to Woodbury, to manipulate people to turn them against the people of the prison. He is put down by Lilly Caul upon the latter's return to Woodbury.
  Series Lifespan: #27–36, #43 (as a zombie), #75 (canon)
- Dr. Stevens was Woodbury's primary doctor. While he resents working for the Governor, he understands that he would be killed if he did not cooperate. He tends to Rick's severed hand, being responsible for his recovery. While escaping Woodbury with the others, he is bitten and presumed to be a zombie. In The Walking Dead: The Fall of the Governor Lilly discovers he has turned into a zombie. She kills him and buries him.
  Series Lifespan: #28–32
- Marianne Dolan Williams is a resident of Woodbury, and the mother of Matthew Williams. She approaches Dr. Stevens as the former is attempting to escape from Woodbury with Rick's party, hoping to schedule an appointment with him for Matthew, who has recently taken ill. Dr. Stevens tells her to reschedule, even though he knows he will never return to Woodbury. It is revealed in The Walking Dead: The Fall of the Governor that Marianne Dolan Williams is still alive and continues to live in Woodbury under the leadership of Lilly Caul.
  Series Lifespan: #32
- Hap Abernathy is a member of the Woodbury Army, who participated in the assault on the prison. After the prison becomes overrun by Walkers, he and a small group of surviving soldiers are led safely back to Woodbury by Lilly Caul.
  Series Lifespan: #48
- Gloria Pyne is a member of the Woodbury Army. She looks for Tyreese and Michonne after they escaped. In The Walking Dead: The Fall of the Governor, it is revealed that Gloria and a small group of surviving Woodbury soldiers had been led safely back to Woodbury by Lilly Caul, who has now assumed leadership of the town.
  Series Lifespan: #45

== Post-prison survivors ==
=== Rosita Espinosa ===
Rosita was a woman who joins up with Sgt. Abraham Ford and Eugene in their mission to reach Washington D.C. She is a foil to Abraham's potential brutality; kind, gentle, and understanding, capable of neutralizing and abating Abraham's emotional instabilities or inhumane talk and urges. After Abraham has an affair with Holly, she moves in with Eugene and begins a relationship with him. She mourns Abraham along with Holly after his death. After two years, she is pregnant but tells Eugene he is not the father. After Alpha marks a border between the Whisperers and the other communities, Rosita is one of the many casualties who has been decapitated with their reanimated head on a spike.

- Series Lifespan: #53–144

=== Abraham Ford ===
Abraham was a Sergeant in the U.S. Army. Sometime after the zombie crisis began, Ford came into contact with Eugene, who claimed he had information that Washington D.C. is the only potential sanctuary from the zombie hordes. Teaming up with Rosita and Eugene, Ford is now on a mission to get there, intending to solve the zombie crisis after Eugene reveals he has crucial information about the zombie's origins. At the Alexandria Safe-Zone he has an affair with Holly, which leads to him breaking up with Rosita. He is murdered by Dwight, a member of the Saviors.

- Series Lifespan: #53–98

=== Eugene Porter ===
Eugene is a high school science teacher who has lied about being a scientist working on a cure for the outbreak disease in order to receive protection from others. He is known for his intelligence, as he knows how to make bullets, and he contributes to the group by suggesting ideas to Rick. He lived with Rosita and they were in a relationship, but he is not the father of her child but promised to raise him as his own. However, Rosita is one of the victims at the hand of The Whisperers. After her death, Eugene becomes distraught, but eventually finds a woman on the radio he built who says she is from Ohio.

- Series Lifespan: #53–193

=== Gabriel Stokes ===
Gabriel was a priest who comes across the group after leaving his church, where he had been hiding from the undead. The group is very suspicious of his story, and does not trust him. He had survived over several months alone in the church by turning away his followers and any other civilians when the zombie attacks started, saving him from internal conflict. As a consequence, however, he now feels remorse. Since arriving at the Safe-Zone, he believes that God's plan for him has been to meet the survivors so that he could eventually preach at the Safe-Zone's church. He eventually redeems himself. During the conflict with the Whisperers he joins Rick's army, training intensively with Dwight and proving to be an excellent shot. While at the guard tower, the Whisperers approach with a zombie herd. Gabriel tries to warn Rick but falls and breaks his leg. Begging for mercy, Beta disembowels him, leaving him for zombies to feast on.

- Series Lifespan: #61–158

== The Hunters ==
- Chris, Theresa, David, Greg, Charlie, and Albert are members of a group of people, the Hunters, who have been tracking down Rick and his group of survivors. The Hunters, led by Chris, start out as a regular group of survivors; but, as food becomes scarce, they resort to cannibalism, reasoning that hunting animals was a waste of time and that humans would be much easier to hunt and kill. They normally hunt down small groups of survivors and isolated ones, and avoid larger groups. Soon after, they have no luck tracking down small groups of survivors, and they resort to hunting down Rick's group because they are getting desperate and need food. Chris and the Hunters successfully capture Dale in the middle of the night as he is leaving to die due to a zombie bite he received earlier in the day. After learning that Dale is "tainted meat" because of his wound, Chris and the Hunters beat him and decide to leave Dale in front of the church that Rick's group is staying at. As Rick's group carry Dale away, the Hunters shoot Glenn in the leg, believing that the survivors would be easier targets if they were scared. Rick's group eventually discovers Chris and the other Hunters in an abandoned neighborhood. Rick attempts negotiations in order to get the Hunters to stop targeting their group. Rick also finds out the Hunters had eaten their own children. This is the only time Chris shows signs of remorse, but justifies it by saying it was to survive, as animals in the wild (bears in this instance) would eat their own young if they would otherwise starve to death. After getting his finger shot off by Andrea, Chris and the Hunters forcefully have their weapons taken away by Abraham. After surrendering to Rick and begging for his life, Chris and the other Hunters are mutilated and beaten to death by Rick and the others to avenge what they had done to Dale and all of their previous victims. His body is later burned, along with those of the rest of his group.
  Series Lifespan: #61–66

== Alexandria Safe-Zone Community ==
Spencer Monroe, as he appears in the comic book series (left) and as portrayed by Austin Nichols in the television series (right).

- Aaron is a recruiter for the Alexandria Safe-Zone Community who comes into contact with Rick's group shortly after they meet Abraham, Rosita, and Eugene. He watches over the group until he finds them suitable for the community. Although the survivors are suspicious of Aaron's motives, they go along with him and join the Alexandria Safe-Zone. Aaron's romantic partner, Eric, also accompanies him on his recruiting missions. After the zombie attack on the community, Aaron trains with Rick and Andrea in order to defend against the undead. Aaron, along with Eric, joins Rick's group as they travel in search of food. He is devastated when Eric is killed in an attack on the Saviors' base, but uses his rage constructively to increase his drive to fight the Saviors. After the time jump, Aaron still resides at the Safe-Zone, but is stabbed by Beta. He survives the attack on the Hilltop, saving Carl from a burning building, and joins Maggie on her journey to Alexandria. He has shown a romantic interest in Jesus.
  Series Lifespan: #67–193
- Pete Anderson was a surgeon. He is physically abusive towards his wife, Jessie and son, Ron. After Rick separates him from his family, Pete flies into a rage and kills Douglas's wife Regina while trying to assassinate Rick. He's executed by Rick on Douglas's orders shortly afterward.
  Series Lifespan, Pete: #72–77,
- Jessie Anderson was the wife of Pete, the surgeon at Alexandria. She finds herself physically abused only for Rick Grimes, a constable, to come in and face the problem. After helping her, Jessie and Rick form a close bond and eventually begin a relationship. She finds peace with her son Ron. However, she is killed during a horde attack at Alexandria. Before she dies, Rick is forced to amputate her arm to save his son after she refuses to let go of him.
  Series Lifespan: #72–83, #85 (as a zombie),
- Ron Anderson was the son of Pete and Jessie Anderson. He is physically abused by his father until his father's death. When the horde attacks Alexandria, he is devoured in front of his mother and she joins him in death.
  Series Lifespan: #72–83,
- Anna is a young girl who arrived during the two year time skip. When Carl moves to the Hilltop, she gives him a letter expressing her feelings towards him.
  Series Lifespan: #129–144
- Annie is a farm hand who arrived during the two year time skip. She seems to have a bond of friendship with Siddiq.
  Series Lifespan: #127–192
- Barbara lives in the Safe-Zone by the time Rick's group arrive. Her whereabouts after the war with Negan are currently unknown, she moved to the Hilltop but is unknown if she survived the battle there.
  Series Lifespan: #72–115
- Bruce serves as second-in-command in charge of the Exploration team that goes to D.C for supplies and the construction workers that explain the community and repairs the walls. He has a friendship with Abraham and Robert where they work together. He is one of the first victims of the zombie outbreak in the Safe-Zone. He is part of the party that tries to clear the zombie herd that is attracted in the wake of the deadly firefight with the Scavengers. While the party tries to get back inside the gate, Bruce is severely bitten on the neck, being the last one to make it through. Once inside of the gate, he falls to the floor and gasps for breath, screaming, "I don't want to die!" He is quickly killed by Abraham out of mercy, who bashes the front of his skull in with a single blow from his weapon.
  Series Lifespan: #69–80
- Dr. Denise Cloyd was the doctor of the Alexandria Safe-Zone. Denise is also romantically involved with Heath. She takes care of many of the characters, such as Morgan and Carl, after they sustain injuries. When the walkers attack the Safe-Zone, Denise is trapped in Rick's house with the group. However, she runs back to her house to take care of any civilians that need her. Rick brings Carl to Denise to take care of him, and she is able to patch him up. When Rick leaves to get food for the community, he asks Denise to watch over Carl. After Negan returns Holly to Alexandria, Denise takes the sack off of her head, and she is revealed to be undead. Before Denise has time to react, Holly bites her arm (only to be put down by Rick seconds later). She refuses Rick's pleas to amputate her arm instead of tending to an injured Heath. She saves his life, and displays willingness to risk her own for him. Denise spends her final hours laid up in bed, with Heath by her side. After speaking her last words to Heath, Denise later passes away. Michonne offers to put her down before she reanimates. She is buried with the other fallen Alexandria residents afterwards.
  Series Lifespan: #71–121
- Eric was Aaron's boyfriend and partner who serves as Aaron's "insurance policy" with the duty to kill anyone who might harm Aaron or the community. During an attempt to recruit a young woman, Eric is stabbed after discovering the woman trying to steal Maggie's horse. Aaron immediately brings Eric back to the Safe-Zone. Doctor Cloyd treats Eric, and he recovers quickly. Later, during the zombie attack on the Safe-Zone, Eric hides with Aaron, though they later join in the fight against the zombies. Eric, along with Aaron, joins Rick's group as they left the community in search of food. Eric is not seen interacting with the Saviors much, he is seen on the wall of the Alexandria Safe-Zone alongside Carl and Rosita. He tells Carl not to try and shoot Negan, however, Carl shoots anyway and hits Negan's bat, Lucille. This causes the Saviors to open fire on his and Carl's position. When Negan asks the people of Alexandria to throw Carl over the wall, Eric tells him to "go fuck himself". Later, as Rick's squad storms the Savior outpost, Eric is one of several to be killed during the siege with a shot to the head. Aaron, who runs up behind him, catches him as he collapses and mourns his fallen partner as bullets fly by. Rick tells Aaron to take cover to which Aaron collects his rifle and tells Rick to lead the way. A vengeful Aaron is seen one of the first to breach the outpost as they make their way inside. Rick and his troops return with Eric's body where it is presumed he is set to be buried there. Aaron is found standing in his home by Heath where he continues to mourn him. Heath consoles his depressed friend and they embrace, remembering the better times of Eric when he was alive.
  Series Lifespan: #68–118
- Erin lives in the Safe-Zone by the time Rick's group. She seems to be quite wise by helping Spencer calm down one time. She is murdered by Alpha along with 11 others and her reanimated head was used as a line marker.
  Series Lifespan: #106–145
- Heath is a young man who goes on scouting missions for the community. He is primarily a supply runner and is well-experienced with navigating the backstreets of Washington. He also begins a relationship with Denise Cloyd. After his partner Scott dies from an infection, Glenn becomes his new partner. He and Glenn share a strong bond. He is initially very distrustful of Glenn's group, seeing Rick as another "Davidson", though he grows to trust them. He defends Rick and his group against Nicholas when Nicholas shows signs of an uprising. Heath seems to be integrated into Rick's inner circle, participating in most meetings and being picked to go to the Kingdom. Overall, Heath has proven to be a loyal member of Rick's group. During an attack by Negan, he loses a leg to a grenade explosion. After the time jump, Heath is mostly seen on a horse, scouting and protecting land. In The Whisperer War, he checks in with Dwight to see what is going on.
  Series Lifespan: #69–192
- Scott was a young man who is a supply runner for the Alexandria Safe-Zone and the best friend of Heath. Scott's leg was injured after jumping from a rooftop. The wound gets infected and not long after Scott dies of the infection.
  Series Lifespan: #69–77
- Holly was Abraham's girlfriend. She works alongside the construction crew, planning and building new walls for the community. Upon having her life saved by Abraham, the two gradually fall in love with each other and initiate a secret relationship behind Rosita's back. She is frequently shown to be behind his back with various interpersonal issues, and at one point urges Abraham to attempt to take charge of the group (though that never truly comes to fruition). Holly is later devastated by Abraham's death. Holly, along with Rick, Heath and Nicholas run after the Saviors in order to kill Negan and his men once and for all. Andrea takes out the driver of Negan's truck and Rick order's Negan and his men not to move. Suddenly the guns are shot out of everyone's hands by men Negan had hidden outside the walls. Carl tries to shoot Negan but he misses and hits Lucille instead. This angers Negan who demands that Carl be thrown over the wall, or he will execute Holly and the others. Holly is seen as one of the people who volunteers to travel with Rick, Paul and Ezekiel to the Sanctuary, the Saviors' main base. After luring walkers to converge at their location, Holly gets on one of the buses and notices that Rick isn't with them. Paul tries to keep her aboard, but Holly escapes and finds Rick. He orders her to get back on the bus before the Saviors begin shooting again, but Holly refuses. She claims it's too risky for him to sacrifice himself like this and volunteers to do it herself. Rick once again tells her to leave but Holly stands her ground again, saying the man who killed Abraham is in there. After again being told to leave, Holly knees Rick in the groin, steals the truck and drives it through the fence. Holly is wounded from the impact and falls out from the driver's side. She's attacked by a walker but Negan saves her, telling Holly that she "isn't getting off that easy." Holly is then taken captive by the Saviors. Negan mistakes Holly for Andrea and admires how quickly she had healed after the fight with Connor. Holly corrects Negan that she is not her, and she was with Abraham. Holly looks over at Dwight and reminds him of who Abraham was. Negan doesn't believe Holly and has her taken away. Holly is almost raped by David, until Negan steps in and kills him. He apologizes to Holly, and assures her that the Saviors aren't monsters. Holly is later captured and unmentioned throughout the war until Negan attacks Alexandria confronting Rick, offering to return Holly in exchange for a talk. Unknown to Rick, Holly is now a walker which is hidden by the bag over her head. When unmasked by Denise, she proceeds to bite her arm. She is then shot in the head by Rick.
  Series Lifespan: #73–119, #120 (as a zombie)
- Josh was a child who befriends Carl when he arrives in the Safe-Zone. Over time the two become good friends and when he is killed by Alpha, Carl cries over his reanimated head.
  Series Lifespan: #70–145,
- Douglas Monroe was a former Democratic Ohio U.S. congressman who becomes the leader of the Alexandria Safe-Zone. He is the husband of Regina and the father of Spencer. He welcomes Rick and company with open arms, though he demands that they follow the rules that he had set in place. He becomes distraught over his wife's death and holes himself up in his house for long stretches of time. During the zombie attack, Douglas is surrounded by zombies. As he tries to shoot the zombies, he accidentally hits Carl Grimes. He is then devoured by the undead. The character was converted and gender-swapped into that of Deanna Monroe for the television series.
  Series Lifespan: #70–83
- Regina Monroe was the wife of Douglas Monroe, and the mother of Spencer Monroe. She is often seen walking around Alexandria with Douglas. She is attending Fr. Gabriel Stokes' church and is demanding at times. She is killed by Pete Anderson, after telling him to put a knife away. Her death allows Douglas to let Rick kill Pete. Douglas is suicidal after his wife's death.
  Series Lifespan: #70–77
- Spencer Monroe was the son of deceased Douglas and Regina Monroe. He and Andrea take a liking toward one another and almost strike up a relationship, but Andrea is disgusted by him when he exhibits signs of extreme selfishness. He later participates in a coup against Rick led by Nicholas, blaming Rick for the death of both of his parents. During the Savior's sojourn in Alexandria, he approaches Negan to tell him that it would be better if he leads Alexandria, and tells Negan that Rick cannot be trusted. He asks if Negan can kill Rick to put him, Spencer, in charge of the Community; disgusted by Spencer's attempted backstabbing of his leader, Negan tells him he is a coward for asking someone else to do his dirty work and promptly disembowels him. Spencer Monroe is portrayed by Austin Nichols on the television series initially as a recurring role in the fifth season. Brian Huntington did a panel-to-screen comparison and commented: "Spencer's intro in the show is pretty similar to his first appearance." Spencer became a series regular from the sixth season. Kelly Lawler of USA Today reviewed the seventh season episode "Service", calling him "Deanna's brat of a son" and saying of the Saviors coming to Alexandria for tribute, "Spencer may be a jerk, but he's not wrong when he yells at Rick for getting them into this situation." Spencer is killed by Negan in the mid-season finale "Hearts Still Beating", and his death was adapted from Issue #111 of the comic book series, for which Kirsten Acuna of Business Insider commented that "If you're a comic reader — and, perhaps, even if you aren't — it was pretty obvious from the moment Spencer approached Negan that things weren't going to go well for him. The end of the episode played out similar to issue #111 when Negan stops by the Alexandria compound when Rick is out on a supply run."
  Series Lifespan: #72–111, #112 (corpse)
- Nicholas was a resident of the Alexandria Safe-Zone Community, as well as a family man. He is shown to be an aggressive yet timid man. When Rick and the survivor group first arrive in the community, Nicholas is one of the most wary, especially after discovering that Rick is allowing Carl to carry a gun. He wastes no time picking arguments with the survivors. He becomes increasingly frustrated as Rick's sense of leadership dominates the community, and it comes to a boiling point once the man murders his close friend in the community, Pete Anderson. Witnessing this, Nicholas quickly attempts to form a coup with his fellow Alexandria citizens and viciously beats Glenn. The coup is quickly dissolved by Rick, and he apologizes. Since then, Nicholas becomes more accepting of Rick and his group and becomes Rick's most trusted ally and participates in his plans. During one of the Savior supply trips to Alexandria, Nicholas, Rick, Heath, and Holly attempt to kill Negan. He is shot in the arm by the hidden Saviors and is lined up by Negan to be executed by his bat, unless the remaining citizens of Alexandria throw Carl over the wall. The citizens refuse his demands and he turns his attention to Rick. Nicholas interrupts and attempts to plead for his life. This only angers Negan, who says that if either Rick, Holly or Heath tell him to kill Nicholas he will do so and spare their lives. In response Heath tells him Nicholas is just scared. Negan proceeds with the execution and starts singing to select his victim, he and the others are rescued by Jesus. After the Saviors attack of Alexandria, he later expresses a desire to leave Alexandria with his family, for their safety, to Rick, who announces matter-of-factly that the entire town will be relocating to the Hilltop Colony. Soon after this, Negan attacks the Hilltop with the Saviors. Nicholas participates in the battle and defends the Hilltop. Later, Rick takes him and Aaron to help corner the saviors. After Rick is shot by Dwight's arrow, Nicholas helps carry Rick back into Gregory's mansion. However he is attacked by a Savior with an infected knife and slashed in the back. He is later seen with Paula, suffering from a severe fever and succumbing to the effects of the wound. He later dies from his wounds with Paula by his side.
  Series Lifespan: #71–125
- Mikey is the young son of Nicholas and Paula; residents of the Alexandria Safe-Zone Community. Mikey initially has a rough relationship with Carl Grimes, though they eventually learn to get along with one another. Eventually Mikey, along with his parents, relocate to Hilltop Colony during the war but move back afterwards. He loses his father during the final battle with Negan.
  Series Lifespan: #71–177
- Paula was a resident of the Alexandria Safe-Zone Community, wife to Nicholas, and mother of Mikey. Little has been revealed about Paula. Paula with her husband and son relocate to Hilltop Colony during the war but move back afterwards. She loses her husband during the final battle. When the Whisperer's herd invaded Alexandria, she was devoured by herd. Her last words to Rick was to take care of Mikey.
  Series Lifespan: #72 (mentioned), #85, #99 - 163
- Olivia was a cheerful young woman in charge of the weapons storage at the Alexandria Safe-Zone. Olivia persuades Douglas to let Michonne keep her weapons after Rick's group joins the community, and also cuts Rick's hair for him. A bit of a gossip, Olivia is the first to tell Rick about Davidson. After the zombie attack, Andrea trains Olivia and the others on how to use weapons, though Olivia has difficulty killing the walkers. Later, Olivia tells Rick that food rations are running low, leading Rick to form a group to find food outside of the community. When Rick and the others leave, Olivia joins Nicholas and Spencer in conspiring against him, though it is unclear what her feelings are on ousting Rick. She does not receive any blame for her part in the conspiracy after it is absolved, and her opinion of Rick seems to have improved. Olivia later admits Maggie Greene and many other residents of the Hilltop Community into Alexandria after the Saviors' second attack on the town. She is still residing in the Safe-Zone after the time skip. During the conflict with the Whisperers Olivia is one of the twelve people who was decapitated by Alpha.
  Series Lifespan: #70–144
- Siddiq is a member of the construction crew who arrived during the two year time skip. During the fair, he heads up the effort to build rooms for the new arrivals.
  Series Lifespan: #127–192
- Tobin heads the construction team. His cowardice in the face of an attack had led to the death of many workers in the past. After taking on Abraham, the team is attacked once again, and Tobin leaves Holly for dead. Abraham saves Holly and kills the walkers much to the amazement of the other workers. This gains Tobin's respect, and he willingly allows Abraham to take over. Tobin is killed defending the community from zombies after a herd breaks through one of the walls.
  Series Lifespan: #69–81

== Washington, D.C. ==
- Derek is the leader of a small group of scavengers in DC. After following gunshots the group finds the Alexandria community. They demand to be let in and threaten Rick at gunpoint. A shootout ensues and Derek's group are all killed. These gunshots attract the attention of the large DC horde which eventually rips through the walls of the community.
  Series Lifespan: #75–78

== Hilltop Colony ==
- Ethan was a member of the Hilltop sent as an emissary (along with Andy, Crystal and David) to Negan's settlement. Unhappy with the Hilltop, Negan kills Andy and David, and keeps Crystal hostage. Ethan is sent back to assassinate Gregory in exchange for her life. After stabbing him, Rick tackles Ethan to the ground before cutting his throat.
  Series Lifespan: #95
- Gregory was a somewhat self-important member of the Hilltop described as "keeping the trains running on time", though he hosts a number of flaws (including hitting on female newcomers of the Hilltop, forgetting names, and putting himself before others). He is stabbed by Ethan in exchange for Crystal's life, who had been taken hostage by Negan, but fortunately recovers. Like his fellow survivors, he is helpless against the Saviors and relies on Rick to help rid them of the gang. His inability to rule becomes increasingly apparent throughout his time in the comics. He is apparently overthrown by Maggie Greene as the Hilltop's leader in Issue 120. When Carl starts to live in the Hilltop and beats two boys almost to death he plans to kill Maggie by poisoning her. However, his plan is foiled by Jesus who arrives in time to save Maggie, who requests that Gregory be jailed. After much deliberation, Maggie decides that Gregory must be killed. He is later hanged for his attempt on Maggie's life as the rest of the Hilltop watch.
  Series Lifespan: #95–141
- Kal was a resident living in the Hilltop Colony who patrols the metal walls protecting Hilltop. He seems to be good friends with Paul Monroe and trusts him. After getting Ezekiel to help their fight against the Saviors, Paul informs Kal of the plan to take Negan down and asks for an estimate on how many soldiers the Hilltop can spare. Later when Paul was supposed to meet Kal again, he is told by Earl Sutton that Kal had gone out "patrolling"; Paul realizes that Kal has gone to inform the Saviors of the attack. Paul catches up with Kal who is hiding in the woods. Paul notices a disturbance, and Kal throws a spear at Paul. Paul catches the spear and breaks it in half before Kal reveals himself. He then tells Paul he believes his action will put the Hilltop in danger with his plan to go against the Saviors. Jesus eventually convinces him that the Saviors need to be defeated if they want to live in peace, and Kal agrees to help. While the two are talking, they forget about the group of Saviors summoned by a flare that Kal set off before Jesus caught up with him. The two nervously make up a new story, but Paul receives a punch to the gut from the Savior member Connor. Kal leaves with Paul, asking if he can keep his betrayal a secret from everyone else. Since then, he joins Jesus's fight against the Saviors. Later, he is able to alert the others of the incoming Savior attack on the Hilltop, and he attempts to stop the Savior's attack, verbally warning Negan. Negan ignores his warning and orders him to be shot; he is then shot in the head by an unnamed Savior, killing him instantly.
  Series Lifespan: #95–123
- Paul "Jesus" Monroe is a bearded man with impressive physical skills who acts as ambassador for the colony and frequently searches for new recruits. He spies on the Alexandria Safe-Zone Community to see if they're safe to bring in. After a pretty tense and unexpected introduction, Paul is attacked by Michonne and Abraham where he easily immobilized them. After instructing to meet Rick, he is knocked out and tied up by him. After the interrogations, Rick eventually decides to let Paul take him to Hilltop, On the way, Paul reveals that he could have escaped anytime but remained there to see if Rick could be trusted. The two make up and continue their way. After reaching Hilltop, he reveals to Rick and his group that he and the rest of his people, for months, have been under siege by the Saviors. He attempts to track them back to their base, but is caught and chased back to the colony. After the death of Glenn, he decides to join Rick in his fight against the Saviors and participates in Rick's plans. After Rick decides to let go of a captive Dwight, Rick tells Paul to follow him and see what they are up against, but to tell no one of their plans. After gearing up, Paul begins to follow Dwight, hoping to discover the Saviors base of operations. He is later ambushed by three Saviors. As he tries to fight off the Savior trio, he is subdued by one of the members. After being knocked to the floor, Paul is almost killed by the Saviors, however, he is saved by Dwight and another Savior, who tell Paul's attackers to stand down, as they have some "important" questions for Paul. Dwight and the other Savior tie Paul up and load him onto a jeep. They drive to Sanctuary, allowing Paul to get a good look at the area and he bails out of the jeep at the very last second, narrowly avoiding capture and reports it back to Rick. He introduces Rick to Ezekiel, the leader of the Kingdom, in the hopes of forming the three communities into standing against the Saviors. As he sneaks into the Hilltop to tell Maggie of Rick's plan, he learns that Kal betrayed him and ran off to inform the Saviors of their plan in which Jesus catches up to him and convinces him to change his mind. He continues to recruit members of the Hilltop, much to Gregory's dismay. Later, As Negan holds Rick, Nicholas, Heath & Holly hostage for attempting to kill him, Jesus arrives at the Safe-Zone, hidden away from Negan and his men. He then grabs a Savior by his foot and trips him over. The Saviors open fire, but instead of hitting Paul they kill the Savior. Negan tells them to hold fire and at that moment Paul throws himself at the nearest Savior and orders Rick, Heath, Holly, and Nicholas into a trench. He proceeds to fight the Saviors until he works his way to Negan, who he disarms and captures. Negan frantically tells the Saviors to hold fire and Paul issues an order to let the survivors go and threatens to kill Negan. He tells Paul that even if he were to succeed, the Saviors would still open fire and kill Paul. However it is revealed that Paul's intentions were to stall the Saviors until Ezekiel and his soldiers arrive. Jesus continues to aid Rick and Ezekiel in their fight against the Saviors until Negan is defeated. Two years after Negan's incarceration, Jesus resides in Alexandria and becomes Rick's right hand-man after Abraham's death.
  Series Lifespan: #91–193
- Earl Sutton is a resident living in the Hilltop Colony who also creates weapons for the colony's survivors. He is the blacksmith who is in charge of making spears, door hinges, knives and many other metal objects needed by the Hilltop. He is also Jesus's good friend.
  Series Lifespan: #95–193
- Brianna is a resident living in the Hilltop Colony. She sees Maggie crying at Glenn's grave and tries cheering her up. She'd lost people in the apocalypse too: her husband, parents, siblings, what passed for a boyfriend, and even her daughter. She helps Maggie understand death, although sad and terrible, is a part of life and is natural; it isn't something we need to be uncomfortable to talk about. She and Maggie are becoming good friends.
  Series Lifespan: #109–192
- Harlan Carson is a doctor in the Hilltop Colony who has treated Maggie, checking out on her baby, making sure everything's okay. When Maggie is stressed out about delivering a baby, Doctor Harlan Carson assures her that her baby will be the third baby he's delivered on the Hilltop. Harlan has been called a miracle worker. Harlan Carson has worked on many people in the Hilltop Colony including their leader, Gregory, whom he had brought back from the brink of death by knife wound.
  Series Lifespan: #95–161
- Dante is a guard in the Hilltop Colony who appears to have a crush on Maggie and is one of her right-hand men. He looked for missing survivor Ken, but was captured and later released alongside Ken by Alpha and The Whisperers. He later helps the others with the conflicts that comes ahead. Maggie sends him to spy on Negan after he leaves Alexandria.
  Series Lifespan: #131–192

== The Saviors ==
- Carson was Negan's man of trust inside the main base. Carson is seen asking Negan about the recent gunfire from Carl, asking if everything's alright and if they need to worry about it, he is also the one who informs Negan that the iron is ready for Mark's punishment. He is later seen in the Sanctuary when Rick's forces have trapped him and the rest of the Saviors inside, by using noise to draw a huge herd to the Sanctuary. He asks Negan if he should set up a meeting, Negan tells him no as there are more "pressing" matters to attend with. Carson is seen along with Negan and Dwight after capturing Eugene. After Negan leaves to have sex with his wives, Carson and Dwight stay behind with Eugene. Dwight explains to Eugene that he is secretly on Rick's side. Carson overhears the conversation, and says as good as his life in the Sanctuary is, he'd much rather be able to see his brother again and live freely. He tells Dwight he'll help him rebel against Negan. After the war he lives with his brother Harlan in the Hilltop. Carson is one of the twelve victims decapitated by Alpha during the conflict with the Whisperers.
  Series Lifespan: #105–144
- Connor was a high-ranking member of the Saviors. Connor spots Rick and his small group's departure to the Hilltop Colony following Abraham's death, and soon after calls for the rest of the Saviors in the area for an attack on the Alexandria Safe-Zone at dawn. Connor's rally is heeded as Andrea reports the Saviors' attack on the community when Rick returns from his confrontation with Negan, though they are repelled and the majority of the attackers are killed. Soon after Kal leaves the Hilltop Colony, he sends a flare to contact the Saviors. Connor is the Savior that leads the group that answers the call. Paul stops the revelation of the plan by telling Connor their next payment of supplies might be a little low. This infuriates Connor, who subsequently punches Paul in the gut and leaves with his group. Later on, Connor volunteers to be part of the back-up team sent by Negan to surround Alexandria's walls while Negan and his team go in to wait for Rick's group to return. After Seth and another Savior are killed by Rick and Andrea, it is presumed that Connor either saw Andrea or the flash coming from the rifle she used because he is later seen inside the bell tower sneaking up on her. He ambushes Andrea by surprise with a knife and proceeds to beat her. As Connor begins to choke her to death, he laments that he feels bad for having to kill her after she's gone through so much more pain and loss than other survivors he's met. A fight ensues, ending when Andrea pushes Connor out of the window to fall to his death.
  Series Lifespan: #99–113, #114 (corpse)
- Dwight is a member of the Saviors who has a half burnt face due to Negan, the leader of the Saviors. Dwight wields a crossbow which he uses to kill zombies and Abraham Ford. During an attack on Alexandria, Dwight is captured and is at first interrogated by Andrea, though after the deaths of Glenn and Abraham and realizing that Negan's group is too strong, he is released by Rick. The release is a ploy from Rick to have Jesus follow Dwight back to the Saviors headquarters. Dwight has a tense relationship with Negan and has since pledged allegiance to Ezekiel's plans to defeat the Saviors. After the war he becomes the leader of the Saviors, but ultimately leaves to become one of Rick's main enforcers in the war against The Whisperers. He is replaced as leader of the Saviors by Sherry, Dwight is shot in the head by Rick.
  Series Lifespan: #98–186
- Negan is the leader of the Saviors. He has gathered together strong men and leads them in terrorizing nearby survivor communities in exchange for food and supplies. Negan sets out for revenge against Rick's group after they kill some members of his gang. Negan orders Abraham's murder. He has some trackers find the Safe-Zone while he and the rest of his gang follow and ambush the group during their trip to the Hilltop. After Rick refuses a deal that would give Negan access to the Safe-Zone's supplies, Negan brutally murders Glenn with a baseball bat wrapped in barbed wire he calls "Lucille". After that the Safe-Zone Community gives him half the supplies to prevent him from killing any more of their members. Negan is notable for using excessive profanity when he speaks, even to his own men. Rick plans a war against Negan, which he wins when Dwight betrays Negan. After the war Negan is kept as a prisoner in the Alexandria Safe-Zone. When Magna and her people arrive in Alexandria they discover Negan in the prison. Negan tells them that he is tortured and pleads them to release him, but Magna knows he's lying and refuses. Later, Negan escapes captivity along with the help of Brandon, who he later kills near Whisperer territory. Negan joins The Whisperers and gains Alpha's trust. When in an isolated area, Negan slits and decapitates Alpha's head over The Whisperers' views on rape. He returns to Alexandria, and bargains with Rick to be a free man within Alexandria after showing Alpha's head. Rick gives him over to Dwight to look after, who returns Lucille to him after he proves his loyalty. After the breaking of Lucille, Negan mourns and buries the baseball bat. He then saves Rick's life from a walker herd at the gates of Alexandria.
  Series Lifespan: #100–193
- Sherry was one of Negan's five wives. She was Dwight's wife before the apocalypse; although they were married, Sherry decided to become one of Negan's wives in order to make both her life and Dwight's easier. One night, Dwight and Sherry meet behind Negan's back and sleep together, violating the rule that none of the Saviors are allowed to have sexual intercourse with Negan's wives unless they have earned enough points, and Negan irons his face as punishment. Dwight harbors some bitterness towards Sherry, blaming her for not giving up her privileged position to stop Negan. After the war, Sherry is never shown but still lives at The Saviors Compound. Currently, Dwight has moved on from her and has found new love in a fellow Savior. However Sherry starts hating how Rick Grimes to trying to bring peace so she starts taking up leadership of the saviors to lead a revolt. Unfortunately this doesn't last long as she is killed by Rick when he accidentally breaks her neck while trying to make a deal with her in order to stop the attack.
  Series Lifespan: #105–166

== The Kingdom ==
- Ezekiel (referred to as "King Ezekiel" by his fellow citizens) was the leader of a community known as the Kingdom. At some point, Ezekiel met and formed a friendship with Paul Monroe who invited his community to join a trading network that includes the Hilltop community Paul belongs to. He later discovers the Saviors are threatening and harassing the other communities in the trade network in exchange for supplies and possibly sees how vicious their leader, Negan really is (despite the truce offered by the Saviors.) He bides his time and waited for the opportune moment to strike back against "this tyrant". The opportunity Ezekiel is waiting for finally comes when Paul brings Rick Grimes to meet him and passes on the information that they have regarding the Saviors' strength and the location of their main base of operations. During the war he starts a relationship with Michonne. Ezekiel was a zookeeper and has known Shiva since she was born. Two years after the war against the Saviors ended, Ezekiel and Michonne broke up, but Ezekiel is confident to start their relationship again. However, he is decapitated by Alpha along with eleven other people during the conflict with the Whisperers.
  Series Lifespan: #108–144
- Shiva was Ezekiel's pet Bengal tiger who resides with him at the Kingdom. Ezekiel has known her since she was born. She presumably had a normal life as a normal zoo tiger. Prior to the events of the series, Ezekiel saved Shiva by neglecting to report her attacking him when she was a cub, eventually leading to a bond with her that continued into the outbreak. She is mostly likely seen sitting with her master at his side as he sits on his throne while Ezekiel keeps Shiva on a chain. Shiva also sleeps in a cage inside Ezekiel's room. According to Ezekiel, Shiva hates violence, and she reacts angrily when Rick punches Dwight. Shiva helps Ezekiel in battle against the Saviors, even when she kills a Savior. It is due to her and Paul "Jesus" Monroe that the Saviors retreat from Alexandria Safe-Zone. Along with Ezekiel, Shiva sleeps in Michonne's house, specifically the bathroom. In the morning, Ezekiel mentions that Shiva defecated in the bathtub. Later, after the battle of the sanctuary, Shiva is seen with Ezekiel and Michonne, eating a dead zombie. Ezekiel tells Michonne that Shiva is able to eat zombies without getting sick. When Ezekiel is cornered by a large group of zombies, Shiva saves him. While Ezekiel runs away, Shiva is shown being attacked, overpowered and devoured alive by the horde, saving her master's life.
  Series Lifespan: #108–118
- William (sometimes referred to as "King William") serves as the de facto leader of The Kingdom after the death of Ezekiel. He rejects some of Ezekiel's traditions, and refuses to be addressed as good sir. He aids the militia of Rick Grimes by supplying him with troops. William joins in with patrols after he sens capable men off to help Rick. He then rides to the Hilltop after hearing news of an attack, but is too late to save everyone. He would later help with the Hilltop Rebuild after the Whisperer War.
  Series Lifespan #157–182

== Richmond, Virginia ==
- Bernie was a part of Magna's group of survivors traveling through the D.C. area. When Paul Monroe, along with the rest of the Alexandria herd-crew are steering the herd away from the Kingdom, they come across his group. The herd began to surround the group and despite Jesus' best efforts, Bernie is unable to escape, resulting in him being grabbed and eaten alive by a large group of them.
  Series Lifespan: #127
- Connie is part of Magna's group who joins the Alexandria Safe-Zone Community two years after the Savior war ends. Along with the rest of the group, she is interviewed by Andrea and later debates about what the group's move against Alexandria will be.
  Series Lifespan: #127–191
- Kelly is part of Magna's group who joins the Alexandria Safe-Zone Community two years after the Savior war ends. After they came across the herd being led by Jesus, Kelly and his group return to Alexandria with him to meet with Rick. He argues with Magna and says they should not trust the Alexandria Safe-Zone group and blames them for Bernie's death in which Magna defends them. Later, after being interviewed by Andrea, Kelly debates with his group and believes the Alexandria Safe-Zone Community is hiding something.
  Series Lifespan: #127–181
- Luke was part of Magna's group who joins the Alexandria Safe-Zone Community two years after the Savior war ends. Luke is shown to be very supportive of Magna being the leader of their group; when Rick asks Magna who the leader is, Magna tries to tell him that there is no leader and surviving was a team effort, but Luke interrupts her and tells Rick that Magna is the leader. Along with eleven other people he was decapitated by Alpha during the Whisperer conflict.
  Series Lifespan: #127–144
- Magna is the leader of the Richmond survivors who joins the Alexandria Safe-Zone Community two years after the Savior war ends. At the beginning of the apocalypse, Magna is one of many survivors who arrive at a nursing home near Washington D.C. Seeing it as a potential safe haven, she decides to stay. After a while, the home becomes too crowded. It is not explicitly said what happens, but Magna and a group of others leave and set off on their own. During the next seven months, several of her groupmates are killed. One day, Magna and her group are attacked by a herd of zombies, and Magna herself is almost bitten on the arm; however, a timely rescue by Paul Monroe saves her life. Paul quickly dismounts from his horse and starts helping Magna and her group fend off the zombies, Paul then tells Magna to cut the horses free from the toppled train-cart and get to safety, saying he and other members of the Alexandria Safe-Zone scout group will rid the zombie herd from the area. After escaping from the herd on horseback, Magna and her group manage to get to a Safe-Zone and after a few minutes of hiding, she, Paul, and the rest of his scout group manage to begin leading the zombie herd away. Shortly after, Paul arrives on horseback to meet her and invites her to join Alexandria's community as long as she agrees to give her weapons over to him. Magna is hesitant to do so at first, but when Paul tells her Alexandria has plenty of food, she accepts wholeheartedly. After she arrives at Alexandria, Paul takes her the community's great hall, where Rick Grimes is waiting to interview her group. Magna introduces him to all the members of her group, Kelly, Luke, Connie, and Yumiko. Rick then tells them to rest up for the day, as he would like to interview each member of the group the next day, saying it is best they get to know each other, Magna agreeing with him before she walks off. After Magna is interviewed by Andrea, Magna is in a house with her group. The group debates about what they will do. Magna says that Alexandria is too good to be true and that they're hiding something and that they will find out what it is that they are hiding. When Rick is absent from Alexandria, Magna and her group discover the prison. They find Negan, who tells them that Rick and his people are animals that torture him and he begs them to release him. Magna does not believe him, saying she knows how a tortured person looks like and they leave him. Later, when Andrea goes back to her home, Magna and her people ambush her, demanding answers. She is currently part of Dwight's army squad. While outside, she notices Negan but is hesitant to shoot him despite Dwight's commands. She is Yumiko's girlfriend.
  Series Lifespan: #127–193
- Yumiko is part of Magna's group who joins the Alexandria Safe-Zone Community two years after the Savior war ends. After her group arrive at Alexandria after a herd attack, she is quick to praise the effort the community is doing. She is Magna's girlfriend.
  Series Lifespan: #127–193

== The Whisperers ==
- Joshua was one of the Whisperers to follow Paul Monroe, Darius and two other guards. He was killed by Paul. Lydia later claimed that Joshua was one of the friendlier members of the Whisperers.
  Series Lifespan: #133–134
- Lydia is one of the Whisperers to follow Paul Monroe, Darius and two other guards. She is captured by Jesus. She is put in a cell next to Carl's. She tries to get information about the Hilltop community by talking to Carl, and later starts a sexual relationship with him.
  Series Lifespan: #133–193
- Alpha was the leader of the Whisperers and Lydia's mother. Her real name is Alphie and insists that even her daughter call her by her title. Alpha and several of her people approach the gates of the Hilltop and exchange Ken and Dante for Lydia. When Carl chases the Whisperers, he is taken prisoner. Alpha decides to infiltrate the Alexandria Safe-Zone and buys a sword at the fair. After meeting Rick she allows Carl and Lydia to leave the Whisperers, on the condition that nobody will cross a border she marked. On their way back, Rick and co. discover that Alpha has decapitated twelve residents of the Safe-Zone, the Hilltop Colony, the Kingdom and the Sanctuary and that she used their heads placed on pikes to mark the border. After Negan appears to have joined her group, Alpha is fatally slashed across the neck and decapitated by him moments afterward.
  Series Lifespan: #132–156
- Beta was Alpha's right-hand man who carries two knives. In an encounter with Michonne and Aaron, he stabs Aaron and attempts to kill Michonne until Dwight and several members of the Militia save them. Upon arriving at the Whisperers' camp, he confronts Negan for lying and attempts to kill him but is thwarted by Alpha. In response to the untimely death of Alpha, Beta takes a leadership position and declares war on Alexandria. During the war he kills Gabriel Strokes and several other members of the Militia. He fights Negan to get revenge for Alpha's death, but gets injured after Negan bashes Lucille on his back several times. Near the end of war, he and few other Whisperers unleash a mega horde of zombies on Alexandria. In a decisive fight While Beta is fighting against Jesus, Aaron shoots him through the chest. He then blacks out as they pull off his mask and recognize him as a famous celebrity. Given that his brain was not destroyed, it is likely that he turned later on.
  Series Lifespan: #154–173

== Oceanside ==
- Pete is a fisherman for Oceanside that has a close friendship with Michonne and Siddiq.
  Series Lifespan: #139–158

== Pittsburgh, Pennsylvania ==
- Juanita "Princess" Sanchez is a lone survivor residing in Pittsburgh and claims to have not seen any survivors in around a year. She is a goofy but capable survivor.
  Series Lifespan: #171–193

== The Commonwealth ==
- Pamela Milton is the governor of the Commonwealth and the mother of Sebastian Milton, who also serves as the final volume's primary antagonist.
  Series Lifespan: #176–193
- Elodie Hawthorne is the daughter of Michonne who is believed to be dead; however, she reaches the Commonwealth and become the cook of the community.
  Series Lifespan: #176–193
- Sebastian Milton is the son of Pamela Milton, who kills Rick Grimes in the penultimate issue.
  Series Lifespan: #177–193
- Mercer is a resident of the Commonwealth and the general of the Commonwealth Army, who later joining Rick Grimes' resistance against Pamela Milton in the final volume.
  Series Lifespan: #177–193
- Kapoor is the sheriff of the Commonwealth in the following years after Rick's death.
  Series Lifespan: #193
- Lance Hornsby is the deputy governor of the Commonwealth, who also serves as the community's bookkeeper and administrator.
  Series Lifespan: #175-192
- Stephanie is a resident of the Commonwealth, who communicates with Eugene over the radio and an ally to Rick's group. Several years after Rick's death, she becomes deceased of unknown causes.
  Series Lifespan: #151-193
- Maxwell Hawkins is a resident of the Commonwealth, who is an ally to Rick's group.
  Series Lifespan: #176-192
- Frost, Samuels, Jerome, George and Rufus are residents of the Commonwealth and soldiers of the Commonwealth Army.
  Series Lifespan: #175 (George, Samuels, Frost and Rufus), #183 (Jerome) - #187 (Frost and Samuels), #188 (Rufus), #189 (George), #192 (Jerome)
- Elias and Curtis are residents of the Commonwealth in the following years after Rick's death.
  Series Lifespan: #193
- Conner is Lydia's husband and a resident of the Commonwealth in the following years after Rick's death.
  Series Lifespan: #193
- Nancy is a resident of the Commonwealth, who is a friend to Elodie and Michonne.
  Series Lifespan: #186-192

== Notes ==
The Walking Dead comic book and the television series based on it are regarded as separate continuities. Therefore, characters and events appearing in one have no effect on the continuity of the other.
