= Battle Pope =

Comic book by Robert Kirkman and Tony Moore

- Cover of the first issue

Publication information
- Publisher: Funk-O-Tron; Image Comics
- Format: Limited series
- Genre: Humor/comedy, superhero
- No. of issues: 16 (2000) / 14 (2005)
- Main character(s): Pope Oswald Leopold II; Jesus H. Christ

Creative team
- Created by: Robert Kirkman; Tony Moore
- Written by: Robert Kirkman
- Artist(s): Tony Moore
- Letterer(s): Robert Kirkman
- Colorist(s): Val Staples

Collected editions
- Genesis: ISBN 1-58240-572-7
- Mayhem: ISBN 1-58240-652-9
- Pillow Talk: ISBN 1-58240-677-4
- Wrath of God: ISBN 1-58240-751-7
- Saint Michael: ISBN 0-97081-082-2

Battle Pope is an independent superhero comedy comic book series created by Robert Kirkman and Tony Moore, which was published by their own small press company under the moniker of Funk-O-Tron originally in 2000. The series was reprinted in color by Image Comics in 2005, with plans to possibly continue it with new stories after collecting the original material. The book tells the tale of a hard drinking, womanizing Pope, condemned by God for his own evil ways, who is called to action to save Saint Michael, with the help of Jesus H. Christ, becoming mankind's final hope in a world overrun by demons following the Rapture.

The comic was adapted into a season of eight animated webisodes that appeared on Spike TV's website in 2008.

== Plot ==
The opening panels show Pope Oswald Leopold II sitting in a bar drinking and reminiscing. There is a flashback to a young child preparing to accept the mantle of Pope. He undergoes martial arts training from Bruce Lee, because "The Pope needs to be ready for anything." After becoming Pope, Leopold leads a life full of drinking, sex and debauchery. Eventually, God casts judgement on the entire human race, condemning them all. He allows the gates of Hell to open and the world is invaded by swarms of demons. After a great war, a treaty is formed and Hell's gates are closed. Human and demon survivors roam the Earth together and co-exist.

After the flashback, Pope witnesses a gang kidnapping a young woman. When Pope tries to stop the group, they summon the demon Belaam. Pope beats the demon after a brief fight by cutting off his right arm with a sword. The woman expresses her gratitude and goes back to Pope's house.

Later that night, Belaam ambushes Pope, killing the woman. While distracted by her death, Pope appears to be killed. As Belaam relishes his triumph, he is shot from behind by Jesus. Pope soon awakens and finds he is in the presence of Jesus and God. They reveal to him that God sent Saint Michael to watch over the good people left on Earth. Lucifer was able to overpower and capture the saint. God gives Pope super-strength and tells him that if he rescues Saint Michael, he will get into Heaven despite his deplorable life.

As Pope and Jesus search for Hellcorp – Lucifer's headquarters on Earth – they are attacked by the Zombie Twins, Lucifer's henchmen. Pope dispatches the duo, but they were not beaten and summon all of Earth's corpses to form a giant, writhing zombie monster. Pope can't stop this new monster, but Jesus is able to destroy them in a brilliant explosion when they try to eat him. After killing the zombies, Pope and Jesus are once again attacked by Belaam, now with a robotic arm, but he is easily defeated.

Finally at Hellcorp, Jesus and Pope enter, only to have to fight waves of demons waiting for them. After putting up an incredible fight, Pope and Jesus are incapacitated and brought before Lucifer. They then discover Lucifer's plan: to steal Saint Michael's halo and combine it with his own demon horns, expanding his powers to godlike proportions. Pope escapes, but is unable to prevent Lucifer from donning the halo and he is banished.

Pope then spends what seems like a long time in Hell, fighting every day to survive. But just 17 seconds later on Earth, Pope is rescued by God, who increases his powers by granting him a halo of his own. With his new-found power, Pope defeats Lucifer and saves Saint Michael. God grants Pope access to Heaven, but he turns it down to stay and protect the people of Earth.

Afterwards, Pope returns home and Jesus becomes his roommate.

== Adaptation ==
Battle Pope was adapted into a season of eight animated webisodes that appeared on Spike TV's website in 2008.
