= The Walking Dead: The Fall of the Governor =

2013 novel by Robert Kirkman and Jay Bonansinga

- Cover of part one
- Author: Robert Kirkman and Jay Bonansinga
- Language: English
- Genre: Post-apocalyptic and horror
- Publisher: Thomas Dunne Books, a division of St. Martin's Press
- Publication date: October 8, 2013 (part one); March 4, 2014 (part two)
- Publication place: United States
- Media type: Print (hardcover)
- Pages: 256 (part one); 288 (part two)
- ISBN: 978-0312548179 (part one); 978-1250052018 (part two)
- Preceded by: The Walking Dead: The Road to Woodbury (2012)
- Followed by: Robert Kirkman's The Walking Dead: Descent (2014)

The Walking Dead: The Fall of the Governor is a two-part post-apocalyptic horror novel written by Robert Kirkman and Jay Bonansinga. Part one was released on October 8, 2013 and part two was released March 4, 2014. The novel is a spin-off of Kirkman's series of graphic novels and explores the back-story of one of the series' most infamous characters, The Governor. The Fall of the Governor is the third and final book in a trilogy of novels, following The Walking Dead: Rise of the Governor and The Walking Dead: The Road to Woodbury.

== Plot ==
=== Part one ===
The Governor announces to Woodbury residents that because of their dwindling supplies, citizens will be sent on supply runs. Later that night, Lilly Caul has nightmares of the apocalypse before being awoken by Martinez to go on the supply run alongside Austin, David, Wes, and Barbara. On the way back to Woodbury, they investigate a crashed helicopter and rescue Christina, the sole survivor. While being treated, Dr. Stevens tells Christina not to trust The Governor. Upon being questioned by The Governor, Christina claims to be a journalist from Atlanta who used the helicopter to escape her previous survivor camp. After Christina insults him, The Governor kills her. The Governor then threatens Dr. Stevens and is later informed of three new arrivals: Rick Grimes, Glenn Rhee, and Michonne.

Meanwhile, Lilly begins a romantic relationship with Austin. During a training session, Austin is injured and rushed to the infirmary. There, they see The Governor, who says that the arrivals attacked him and that he had to cut off the leader's hand. While Rick is in the infirmary, he keeps Glenn and Michonne prisoner, the latter of whom he regularly beats and rapes. Some time after, Lilly learns she is pregnant with Austin's baby.

One day, arena fighter Harold Abernathy is killed by Eugene Cooney. As a result, The Governor forces Michonne to fight Eugene, whom she decapitates with her katana. The Governor learns that the three prisoners' camp is a prison, and he tasks Martinez with gaining Rick's trust and helping them escape so they can be led to it. Martinez helps Rick escape, alongside Dr. Stevens and his assistant Alice. Outside, Dr. Stevens is killed by walkers, while Michonne goes back to The Governor's apartment for revenge. She knocks out The Governor, ties him up, tortures him via genital mutilation, amputates his right arm, and gouges his left eye out. Afterward, Gabe and Bruce find Austin and Lilly.

=== Part two ===
Bob Stookey takes Dr. Stevens' place and treats The Governor's injuries. Outside Woodbury, Lilly kills a reanimated Dr. Stevens. In the wake of The Governor's coma, Lilly steps up to help lead Woodbury. The Governor eventually wakes up and tells her the plan he concocted with Martinez. Additionally, asks Lilly to find Martinez, who has been missing for a week. Lilly forms a search party and finds that Martinez is a walker. They cut off his head and turn it into The Governor. Later that night, the Governor makes his first public appearance since the attack, shows the crowd Martinez's head, and declares war on Rick and his group. Lilly notices The Governor's lie, placing doubt in his leadership. Shortly after, Lilly suffers a miscarriage due to stress.

Bruce takes some Woodbury residents for a supply run at a National Guard station to search for weapons. There, they encounter Rick's group, who kills all of the Woodbury residents and gravely wounds Bruce. The Governor arrives, kills Bruce, and follows the tracks to Rick's prison.

Several weeks later, The Governor and his army attack the prison but are repelled. Michonne and Tyreese attack the retreating army, but instead Tyreese is captured, and Michonne's katana is stolen. Woodbury returns the next day and offers an ultimatum: give up the prison, or he will kill Tyreese. After Rick refuses, The Governor decapitates Tyreese using Michonne's katana.

Michonne infiltrates Woodbury and steals back her katana. In Woodbury's third attack, Gabe is killed by Andrea. The Governor uses his tank to destroy the prison's fences. During the invasion, The Governor kills Hershel Greene and Alice. Lilly kills Rick's wife Lori. Lilly quickly realizes that the woman was carrying a baby, who was crushed under Lori's body. Realizing The Governor's sinister nature, Lilly kills him. Meanwhile, a horde of walkers invade the prison. Woodbury's remaining soldiers flee into the prison, and Austin reveals a walker bite, sacrificing himself so the others can escape. The army returns to Woodbury, where Lilly becomes the new leader. She kills Penny, The Governor's zombified niece, as well as the walker heads he kept in fish tanks.
