= Jay Bonansinga =

American writer and director

- Born: Champaign, Illinois, U.S.
- Occupations: Novelist; writer; film director
- Writing career
- Period: 1988–present
- Genres: Horror, science fiction, drama, genre fiction, post-apocalyptic fiction
- Notable works: The Walking Dead: Rise of the Governor, The Walking Dead: The Road to Woodbury
- Website: jaybonansinga.com

Jay Bonansinga is an American writer and director. He has written a number of fiction and non-fiction works, co-written various novels based on The Walking Dead comics series, including The Walking Dead: Rise of the Governor (2011) and The Walking Dead: The Road to Woodbury (2012). He also directed a short film, City of Men, and a feature film, Stash.

== Credited works ==
=== Bibliography ===
==== Fiction ====
- 1994 The Black Mariah
- 1995 Sick
- 1996 "Black Celebration" from the 1996 anthology Miskatonic University edited by Martin H. Greenberg and Robert Weinberg.
- 1997 The Killer's Game
- 1998 Head Case
- 2000 Bloodhound
- 2001 The Sleep Police
- 2004 Oblivion
- 2005 Frozen
- 2006 Twisted
- 2007 Shattered
- 2008 Perfect Victim
- 2011 The Walking Dead: Rise of the Governor (with Robert Kirkman)
- 2012 The Walking Dead: The Road to Woodbury (with Robert Kirkman)
- 2012 Just Another Day at the Office: A Walking Dead Short
- 2012 "Heavy" from the 2012 short story collection Shadow Show edited by Sam Weller and Mort Castle
- 2013 The Walking Dead: The Fall of the Governor (with Robert Kirkman)
- 2014 The Walking Dead: Descent
- 2015 The Walking Dead: Invasion
- 2015 Lucid
- 2016 The Walking Dead: Search and Destroy
- 2016 Self Storage
- 2017 The Walking Dead: Return to Woodbury

==== Non-fiction ====
- 2005 The Sinking of the Eastland: America's Forgotten Tragedy
- 2011 Triumph of The Walking Dead: Robert Kirkman's Zombie Epic on Page and Screen
- 2012 Pinkerton's War: The Civil War's Greatest Spy and the Birth of the U.S. Secret Service
