= The Walking Dead: The Road to Woodbury =

2012 novel by Robert Kirkman and Jay Bonansinga

- First edition cover
- Author: Robert Kirkman and Jay Bonansinga
- Cover artist: Christophe Dessaigne and Shane Rebenschied
- Language: English
- Genre: Post-apocalyptic and horror
- Publisher: Thomas Dunne Books, a division of St. Martin's Press
- Publication date: October 16, 2012
- Publication place: United States
- Media type: Print (hardcover)
- Pages: 288
- ISBN: 0-312-54774-9
- Preceded by: The Walking Dead: Rise of the Governor (2011)
- Followed by: The Walking Dead: The Fall of the Governor (Parts I and II) (2013-2014)

The Walking Dead: The Road to Woodbury is a post-apocalyptic horror novel written by Robert Kirkman and Jay Bonansinga and released October 16, 2012. The novel is a spin-off of Kirkman's series of graphic novels and explores the back-story of one of the series' most infamous characters, Lilly Caul. The Road to Woodbury is the second in a trilogy of novels, following The Walking Dead: Rise of the Governor and preceding The Walking Dead: The Fall of the Governor (Parts I and II).

== Plot ==
The book focuses on Lilly and her path to Woodbury, Georgia, a rural town that is barricaded and walled off to separate the living from the undead. It seems to be the perfect sanctuary. Life appears idyllic, with plenty of food, shelter and security provided to its residents. The town expands and grows stronger every day, and its leader, The Governor (Philip Blake), keeps the citizens in line.

Lilly begins to suspect all is not as it seems. Blake, who relishes his title as The Governor, has disturbing ideas about law and order. Lilly and a group of rebels band together to fight The Governor. Mayhem and destruction result when they challenge his reign.

== Characters ==
- Josh Lee Hamilton
- Lilly Caul
- Everett Ray Caul
- Bob Stookey
- Brenda Stookey
- Phillip Blake
- Chad Bingham
- Donna Bingham
- Sarah Bingham
- Lydia Bingham
- Mary Bingham
- Ruthie Bingham
- Megan Lafferty
- Caesar Martinez
- Scott Moon
- Penny Blake

=== Deaths ===
- Brenda Stookey
- Everett Ray Caul
- Sarah Bingham
- Chad Bingham
- Josh Lee Hamilton
- Scott Moon
- Megan Lafferty
- Penny Blake

== Reception ==
The Examiner.com said:

The novel fleshes out . . . backstories and connects them, giving depth to people who remained largely mysteries in the comic books. For comic book readers, the novel is full of Easter eggs and surprise connections, making it not only entertaining, but necessarily for filling in the gaps left by the comic books . . . ‘The Road to Woodbury' is an essential read for any fan of ‘The Walking Dead'.
