= The Walking Dead: Rise of the Governor =

Book by Robert Kirkman

- First edition cover
- Author: Robert Kirkman and Jay Bonansinga
- Cover artist: Neil Lang
- Language: English
- Genre: Post-apocalyptic and horror
- Publisher: Thomas Dunne Books, a division of St. Martin's Press
- Publication date: October 11, 2011
- Publication place: United States
- Media type: Print (hardcover)
- Pages: 307
- ISBN: 0-312-54773-0
- Followed by: The Walking Dead: The Road to Woodbury (2012)

The Walking Dead: Rise of the Governor is a post-apocalyptic horror novel written by Robert Kirkman and Jay Bonansinga and released October 11, 2011. The novel is a spin-off of The Walking Dead comic book series and explores the back-story of one of the series' most infamous characters, the Governor. Rise of the Governor is the first in a trilogy of novels. The Walking Dead's fourth season utilizes plots from the novel, the Chalmers family in particular.

== Plot summary ==
I always kind of looked at it like Rick and the Governor were two sides of the same coin. If Rick had gone down a certain path he could have ended up exactly like that guy. And so I had a story in mind of how he became that guy and what caused him to be that bad of a person.

— Robert Kirkman discussing the general inception of the plot of Rise of the Governor with comparisons to the graphic novels.

The novel follows the story of Philip Blake, his daughter Penny, his older brother Brian, and his friends Bobby and Nick as they struggle to survive in a world ravaged by the zombie apocalypse.

The hungry group of survivors is hiding in a large house within the private neighborhood of Wiltshire Estates, planning to move on to Atlanta, where a "safe zone" is supposedly located. A walker comes out of its hiding place and infects Bobby with the undead plague, killing him. Distraught, the remaining four group members continue on.

Once in Atlanta, they find the city swarming with walkers. The group frantically flees from a large herd of undead until they hear a voice calling them to an apartment building. The voice belongs to April Chalmers, who lets them into the building that she and her father, Dave, and sister, Tara, have secured.

The elderly Dave expires and turns without having been bitten. After Philip "kills" Dave, tension grows between him and Tara. Philip sexually assaults April. The morning afterwards, April is nowhere to be found, and Tara forces the group, at gunpoint, to leave the building.

The Blakes and Nick find a villa atop a hill and decide to stay there indefinitely. Brian's suspicions of a group following them are not taken seriously until the very group violently forces them out of the house. A firefight ensues, and as Brian flees with Penny in his arms, she is shot and killed, thus turning into one of the undead. Philip captures two shooters from the firefight and slowly and cruelly tortures them. Nick and Brian discover the torture victims and are horrified at what Philip has done. Brian tries to defend his brother, and Nick reluctantly agrees with Brian. Philip refuses to kill the zombified Penny, and this causes some concern for Nick, because he believes Philip is keeping Penny's soul from moving on. However, with some convincing, Nick agrees to keep the undead Penny with the group, and they all venture onwards until they stumble across the town of Woodbury.

At Woodbury, there is not much order or unity among the citizens, but the tiny populace is led by a small group of ruthless National Guardsmen under the command of Major Gene Gavin. After chaining Penny in a nearby wooded area, the three men gain admission into the town. Philip manages to sneak Penny into his house during the night. Philip's mental instability becomes too much to bear for Nick and Brian one night, when they discover Philip attempting to murder a local girl in the woods. Nick kills Philip, and following this, Brian shoots Nick to death.

Mentally and emotionally exhausted, Brian leaves the bodies in the woods for the walkers, and contemplates what he will do now that he is alone.

After being herded into a "town meeting", Brian discovers that Major Gavin is attempting to make all its citizens "pull their own weight"; if anyone refuses or dissents, they will be shot. A man, Detroit, dismissing the decree as ludicrous, attempts to leave the town meeting and is immediately shot by Major Gavin. Brian feels himself undergoing a metamorphosis as he shoots Major Gavin. The Woodbury citizens begin to crowd around him and, when he is asked by Caesar Martinez for his name, Brian replies: "Philip Blake".

== Characters ==
- Main Group
  - Brian Blake
  - Philip Blake
  - Penny Blake
  - Nick Parsons
  - Bobby Marsh
- Atlanta Apartment Complex Survivors
  - April Chalmers
  - Tara Chalmers
  - David Chalmers
- Peach Villa Survivors
  - Tommy
  - Shorty
  - Sonny
  - Cher
  - Tattooed Home Invader
  - Possibly Other Unseen Invaders
- Woodbury Survivors
  - Major Gene Gavin
  - Gabe
  - Bruce Cooper
  - Dr. Stevens
  - Caesar Martinez
  - Alice
  - Bob
  - Detroit
  - Jim Bridges' Daughter

== Reception ==
Examiner.com said:

An excellent companion to The Walking Dead comic books. The story is enriched by the novel format, and the characterization of the series' most hated villain is something no fan will want to miss.
