= Bloodletting (The Walking Dead) =

- The Walking Dead episode
- Hershel Greene works on saving the life of Carl Grimes.
- Episode no.: Season 2 Episode 2
- Directed by: Ernest Dickerson
- Written by: Glen Mazzara
- Cinematography by: David Boyd
- Editing by: Nathan D. Gunn
- Original air date: October 23, 2011

Guest appearances
- IronE Singleton as Theodore "T-Dog" Douglas; Lauren Cohan as Maggie Greene; Pruitt Taylor Vince as Otis; Emily Kinney as Beth Greene; Scott Wilson as Hershel Greene; Jane McNeill as Patricia; Kelley Davis as Paula; James Allen McCune as Jimmy; Deja Dee as Mom #1; Amy Cain as Mom #2

Episode chronology
← Previous "What Lies Ahead"	Next → "Save the Last One"
- The Walking Dead season 2

"Bloodletting" is the second episode of the second season of the post-apocalyptic horror television series The Walking Dead, and the 8th overall episode of the series. It initially aired on AMC in the United States on October 23, 2011. The episode was written by Glen Mazzara and directed by Ernest Dickerson. In this episode, Rick Grimes (Andrew Lincoln) and Shane Walsh (Jon Bernthal) rush to save the life of Rick's son, Carl (Chandler Riggs), and discover a possible safe haven in the process.

Production commenced in Newnan, Georgia at Newnan High School in early July 2011, after attaining approval from the city council and the Coweta County School System. The episode featured guest appearances from Scott Wilson, Lauren Cohan, Emily Kinney and Pruitt Taylor Vince, amongst several other recurring actors and actresses for the series. "Bloodletting" was well received by television critics, who praised the character development in the episode. Upon airing, it gained 6.70 million viewers and garnered a 3.6 rating in the 18-49 demographic, according to Nielsen ratings.

== Plot ==
In a flashback, Lori Grimes is talking with other mothers about a fight she had with her husband, Rick. Rick's partner, Shane Walsh, pulls up in a police cruiser and tells Lori that Rick has been severely wounded in a highway shootout. Lori then tells her and Rick's son, Carl the news, causing him to break down in tears.

In the present, Carl has been accidentally shot by a man named Otis (Pruitt Taylor Vince), who was hunting for deer. Otis brings Rick, Carl and Shane to a veterinarian named Hershel Greene (Scott Wilson), for whom Otis works as a farm hand. Hershel lives with his daughters Maggie (Lauren Cohan) and Beth (Emily Kinney), Beth's boyfriend Jimmy (James Allen McCune), and Otis' wife Patricia (Jane McNeill). He treats Carl, but he reveals that the bullet was broken into six fragments. Rick must donate blood to Carl in order to keep him alive.

Lori, Glenn, Carol, Daryl, and Andrea are still searching for Carol's daughter, Sophia, when they overhear a gunshot. Meanwhile, on the highway, Dale believes that T-Dog has contracted a blood infection from the wound he received in the previous episode, prompting their fruitless search for antibiotics.

At the Greene farm, Hershel reveals that Carl needs major surgery to live, and that he will need a respirator. Otis suggests that they might find supplies at a nearby high school—where the Federal Emergency Management Agency has set up a trailer—although the place is likely overrun with walkers. Otis and Shane decide to get the supplies, while Maggie retrieves Lori from the group and brings her to the Greene home. Rick and Hershel discuss the walker epidemic; Rick believes there is no cure, while Hershel has faith that there could be one.

The group searching for Sophia returns to the highway, where Daryl reveals that he has a bag containing painkillers and doxycycline antibiotics that T-Dog can take. Shane and Otis retrieve the supplies, but are spotted by walkers. The two have no choice but to barricade themselves in the high school.

== Production ==
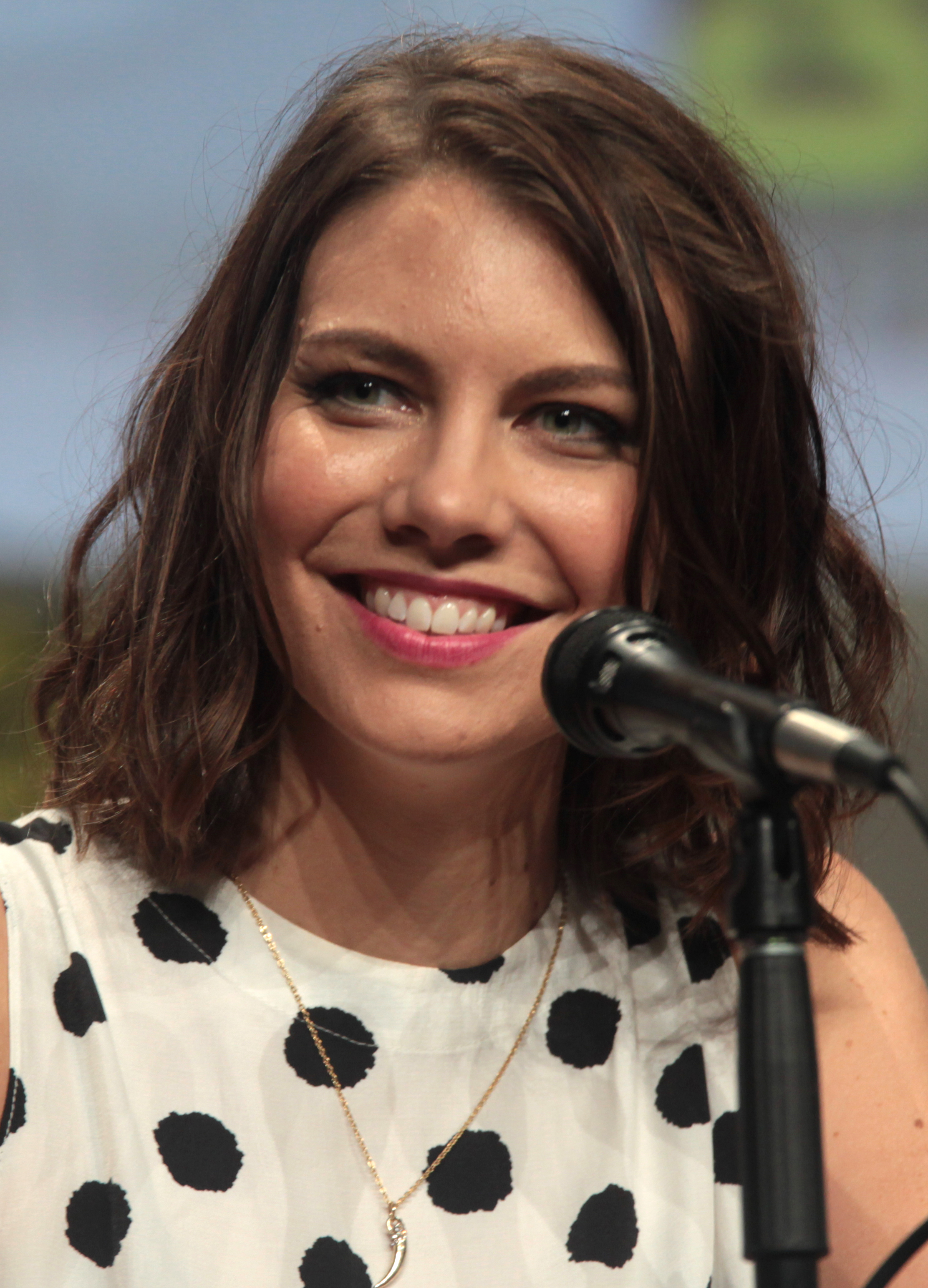
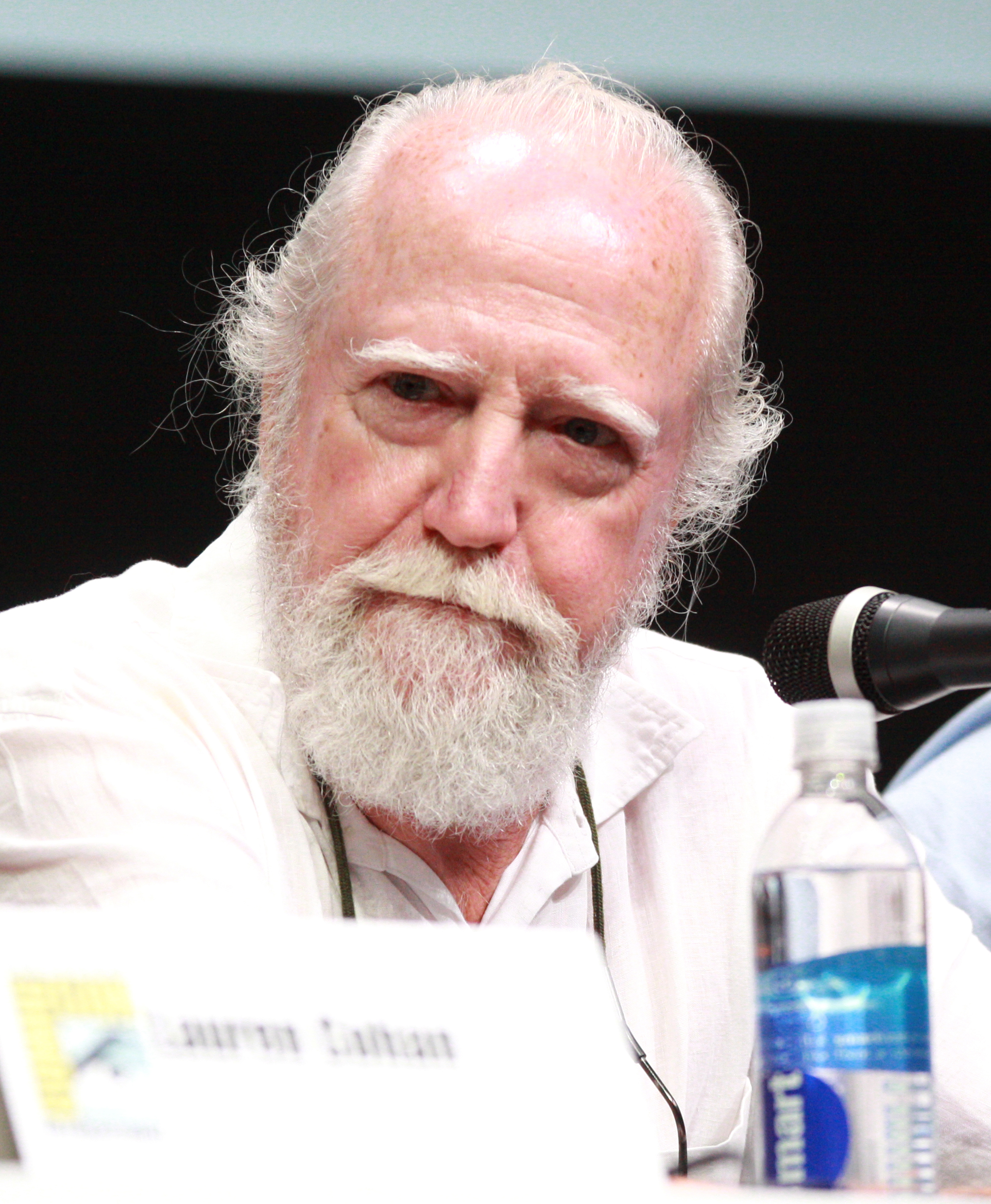
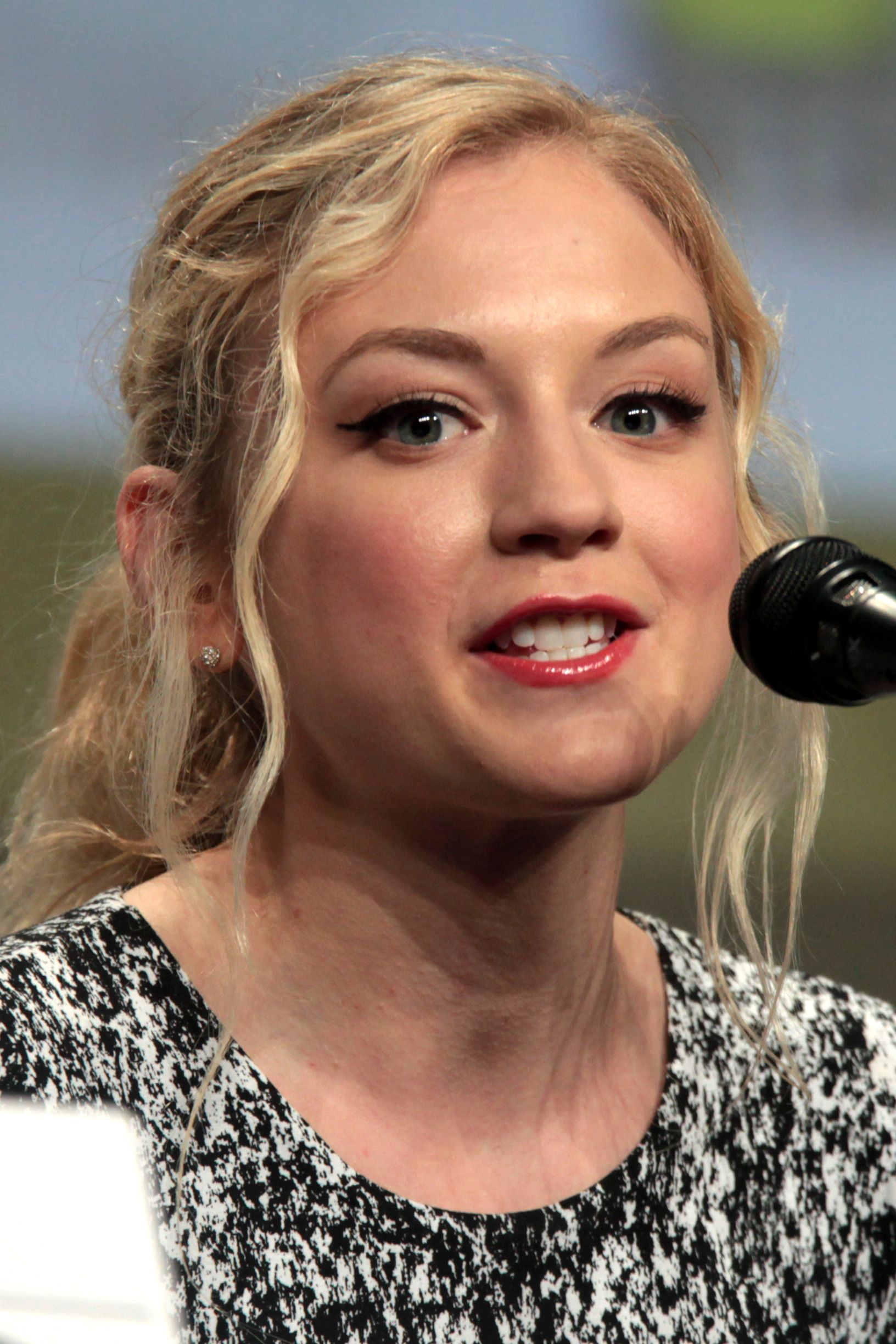
Lauren Cohan, Scott Wilson and Emily Kinney make their first appearances in this episode as Maggie Greene, Hershel Greene and Beth Greene, respectively.

"Bloodletting" was written by Glen Mazzara and directed by Ernest Dickerson. In June 2011, it was announced that Scott Wilson, Lauren Cohan, and Pruitt Taylor Vince would appear on the second season as recurring characters. In an interview with TV Guide, Gale Anne Hurd explained that Wilson's character, Hershel Greene, served as a patriarchal figure for the group. She continued: "He's a veterinarian with a great sense of humanity and a very unique take on the [walkers]." According to Hurd, Scott Wilson was cast because of his "tremendous scope and gravitas". Hurd also stated that Cohan's character, Greene's daughter Maggie, was a woman in her twenties who eventually becomes a romantic interest for Glenn (Steven Yeun). Further, Cohan added in an interview with the Philadelphia Daily News that Maggie was a Christian from a sheltered background. In preparation for her role, she spent a few months in Los Angeles, California to work with a dialect coach. Emily Kinney also joined the cast as Hershel's younger daughter and Maggie's half-sister, Beth.

Principal photography commenced in Newnan, Georgia at Newnan High School in July 2011, after approval was received from the city council and the Coweta County School System. Site preparation initiated on July 1, and filming began at the gymnasium of the school over a period of four days from July 7–8 and again from July 11–12. The location was temporarily renovated to mirror an abandoned Federal Emergency Management Agency camp. Michael Riley, the production manager for the episode, contacted the Newnan Police Department to collaborate with producers. Because of the large size of the filming location, Riley's production company notified surrounding neighborhoods, to avoid inconvenience.

"Bloodletting" begins with a flashback of Rick Grimes' relationship with Lori, before she became romantically linked to Shane. In an interview with Entertainment Weekly, Robert Kirkman asserted that it "speaks to Shane and his relationship to Lori and Rick in the early days." He continued:

"A lot of people think of Shane as a clear villain and that he did a bad thing. But if you really analyze that situation, he’s a good guy and has done the right thing at every turn. Because he's done that, and it’s not working out for him, it’s driving him crazy. So we really wanted to show that he’s a tragic figure much more than a villainous figure. It’s just a series of unfortunate situations that have led to him slowly losing himself in this world. Popping back in time and showing his concern for Rick and how he cares for Lori and Carl, I thought that would be a good thing to do."

During a scene on the road, Daryl reveals a plastic bag of Merle's drug stash he originally kept in hiding from the crew, only bringing it out to aid T-Dog's rising fever. In the bag are doxycycline (because, Daryl explains, Merle occasionally catches the clap), painkillers, ecstasy, and methamphetamine. The meth is blue, leading to speculations that it was a reference to the famous blue meth prepared by Walter White in the television series, Breaking Bad. In his interview in the after-show Talking Dead, Kirkman stated that the scene was "a little Easter egg we were doing for AMC fans."

== Reception ==
=== Ratings ===
"Bloodletting" was first broadcast on October 23, 2011, in the United States on AMC. The episode received 6.70 million viewers and attained a 3.6 rating in the 18-49 demographic, according to Nielsen ratings. An encore presentation gained an additional 2.077 million viewers and garnered a 1.0 rating in the 18-49 demographic. Along with becoming the highest-rated program on basic cable for the night, "Bloodletting" became the second highest-rated program of the week on basic cable, scoring higher than the season finale of Jersey Shore, but garnering less than a game between the Miami Dolphins and the New York Jets as part of the 2011 NFL season. Total viewership and ratings for the episode were moderately down from the previous episode, "What Lies Ahead", which was watched by 7.26 million viewers and attained a 3.8 rating in the 18-49 demographic, according to the Nielsen ratings.

=== Critical response ===
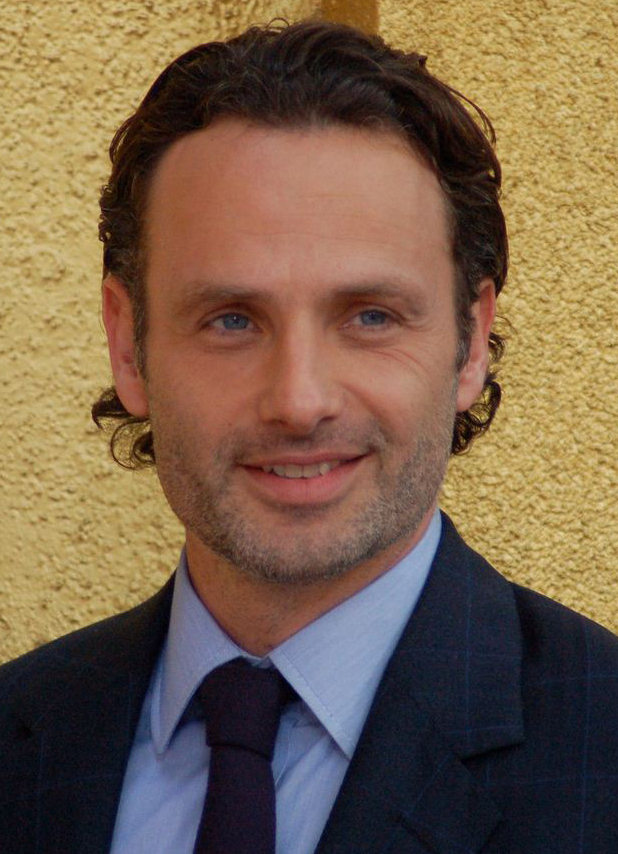
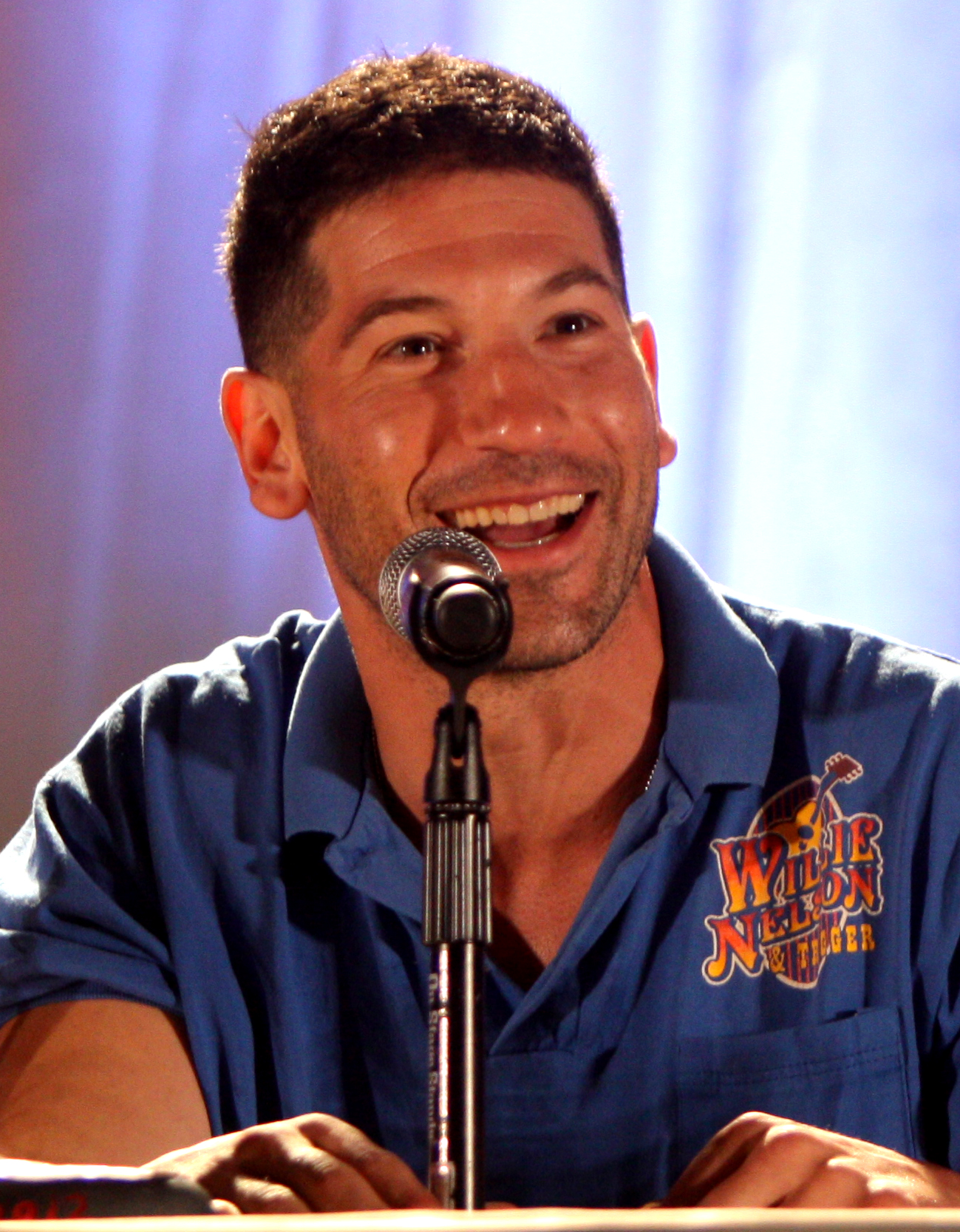
Critics reacted positively to the interactions between Rick (Andrew Lincoln) (left) and Shane (Jon Bernthal) (right).

The episode was well received by television critics. Ology writer Josh Harrison gave the episode a nine out of ten rating, and opined that the episode was a "home run episode" for the series. Harrison continued: "Its central conflict is intense, its action is solid, and its new arrivals are engaging characters in their own right. Light on the gore and heavy on the drama—just how I like my Sunday night zombie adventures." Scott Meslow from The Atlantic gave the episode a positive review, deeming it as an improvement from the previous episode, and appreciated that the episode had opened up new plot points for future episodes to come. Meslow wrote, "At the bare minimum, The Walking Dead should be exciting, and the final moments of "Bloodletting" provides more than enough action." Echoing similar sentiments, Catherine Gee of The Daily Telegraph gave the episode a 3.5 out of 5 stars, and compared it to the second season premiere, opining: "It may have been a calmer episode but there was no shortage of story to chew on."

Joe Oesterle of Mania.com commended the opening sequence of the episode, and praised the performances of Lincoln and Bernthal. Oesterle wrote, "Andrew Lincoln and Jon Bernthal [...] gave a fine bit of acting, and I found it interesting how the character Rick started looking and walking a little bit zombish after giving blood. The scenes between the two men were moving, and if you listened close you could decipher the main differences between these two cowboy cops. Rick is bound and determined to get back to his wife and let her know their son is in mortal danger, without ever doubting his own ability to successfully complete the mission, while Shane on the other hand is not quite as automatically selfless and heroic." In conclusion, Oesterle gave "Bloodletting" a 'B' grade. Eric Goldman of IGN gave the episode an 8.5 out of ten, signaling a "great" response. Goldman stated that it was an improvement over the last episode, and that it had a great scare moment and cliffhanger. Similarly, Paste's Josh Jackson gave the episode an 8.3 out of ten rating, signifying a "commendable" rating. Steve West of Cinema Blend expressed that "Bloodletting" was superior to the previous episode, opining that it was "a character strengthening episode." He continued: "Even those throwaway threads are immensely important to what’s about to go down at the Green farm."

It was, by and large, a tedious hour, as most "Oh my god, will this boy die?" hours tend to be. There was some fun zombie action during the assault on the school, and we got a wince inducing surgery scene as the doctor pulled out a fragment of bullet from Carl's stomach, but in between this was a lot of talking, and little of it served much purpose beyond filling time.

— Zach Handlen of The A.V. Club

Some television critics were less enthusiastic about the episode. Zack Handlen from The A.V. Club felt that the episode was inferior to the previous episode, deeming it tedious. He wrote, "'Bloodletting' was a step down from last week's première, mostly because it focused more on conversations than scares. Much as I want this show to find some way to do its characters right, those conversations were bland, providing no new information beyond, hey, it would suck to have your son get shot in front of you, huh?" Concluding his review, Handlen gave the episode a 'B−' grade. In concurrence, Nate Rawlings of Time stated: "For an episode titled 'Bloodletting' there was surprisingly little of it last night. What we got instead were outpourings of emotion and frustration. Two entries in, and it's already clear that the show wants to strike a balance between gore and humanity." Andrew Conrad of the Chicago Tribune was unhappy with the episode; he expressed disappointment with the low number of zombie sequences, writing, "It must be a bit of a relief for the show's make-up department, but I'd like to see at least one walker every ten minutes or so."
