= Better Angels (The Walking Dead) =

- The Walking Dead episode
- Carl aims his gun at a reanimated Shane, who slowly walks towards Rick.
- Episode no.: Season 2 Episode 12
- Directed by: Guy Ferland
- Written by: Evan Reilly; Glen Mazzara
- Cinematography by: Rohn Schmidt
- Editing by: Hunter M. Via
- Original air date: March 11, 2012

Guest appearances
- IronE Singleton as Theodore "T-Dog" Douglas; Lauren Cohan as Maggie Greene; Emily Kinney as Beth Greene; Michael Zegen as Randall Culver; Scott Wilson as Hershel Greene; Jane McNeill as Patricia; James Allen McCune as Jimmy

Episode chronology
← Previous "Judge, Jury, Executioner"	Next → "Beside the Dying Fire"
- The Walking Dead season 2

"Better Angels" is the twelfth and penultimate episode of the second season of the post-apocalyptic horror television series The Walking Dead, which aired on AMC in the United States and Canada on March 11, 2012.

Following the death of Dale Horvath in the previous episode, this episode presents a shift in attitudes amongst the group members. This episode features the death of Shane Walsh (Jon Bernthal). This episode explores the depths of Shane's antagonistic behavior culminating in his murder of Randall (Michael Zegen) and ultimately a fatal confrontation with Rick where he meets his own untimely demise, as Rick kills Shane before Shane unexpectedly reanimates without having ever been bitten.

Dale's death also influences the character development of Carl Grimes who has shown increased maturity in confronting the reality of the death of people close to him and the consequences of his actions. This mental growth is displayed when he properly uses his gun to dispatch a zombified Shane and save his father's life.

As creator Robert Kirkman describes: "That scene right there, Carl would never have had the strength to pull the trigger and save his father from Shane zombie if he hadn't had that ordeal with Dale and felt responsible for killing Dale because he wasn't able to shoot that zombie".

== Plot ==
Dale Horvath's death has profoundly impacted the group cohesion. Rick Grimes, reflecting back on Dale's last words that the group is "broken," abandons Randall's execution and plans to release the boy. Hershel Greene allows the group to stay as winter approaches, and they help to gather supplies and secure the property from walkers. A guilt-ridden Carl Grimes discloses his role in the events surrounding Dale's death, and Rick helps to console him.

Shane Walsh is left speechless after Lori Grimes expresses all of her feelings to him, including uncertainty, regret, and appreciation toward her former lover in an attempt to keep him stationed with the group. Shane sneaks into the barn, and takes Randall at gunpoint out into the woods, supposedly looking to join Randall's group. There, he breaks Randall's neck, killing him, and then smashes his own face against a tree and hides his gun.

Shane returns just as Randall's absence is discovered. Shane lies that Randall had escaped and overpowered him before running into the woods. Rick, Shane, Daryl, and Glenn set off to find Randall. They split up, with Shane leading Rick in one direction. Daryl and Glenn discover Randall, now reanimated as a walker, which they dispatch before investigating the body and finding he died from the broken neck, but had not suffered any bite marks from a walker. They question how Randall had become a walker.

Meanwhile, Shane continues to lead Rick back towards the farm, but Rick has grown suspicious that Shane wants to assassinate him and blame his death on Randall. Shane draws his gun on Rick, but Rick refuses to engage, challenging Shane to kill an unarmed man. Rick continues to talk to Shane, allowing him to get close enough to stab Shane in the chest. Shane collapses and dies, as Rick grieves for his lost friend. As he is mourning, Carl walks up, and then aims his gun toward Rick. Rick thinks Carl is upset that he killed Shane and tries to plead with him. Rick is surprised when Carl fires at the reanimated body of Shane that was advancing on Rick from behind, killing him.

Unbeknown to them, Carl's gunshot has attracted the attention of a horde of walkers in the nearby woods that start to advance on their location.

== Production ==
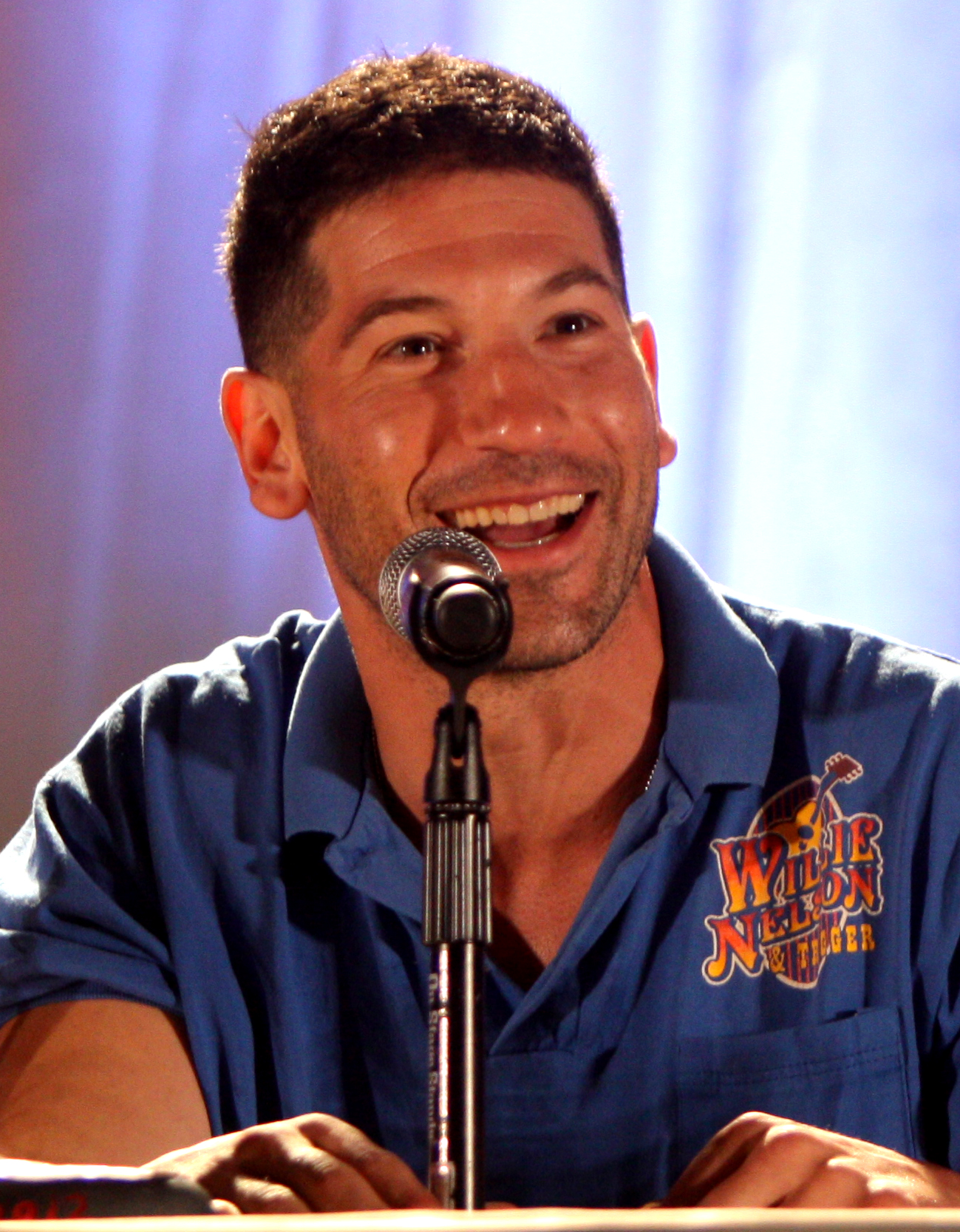
Jon Bernthal made his final regular appearance in this episode after his character is killed by Rick and Carl.

"Better Angels" was directed by Guy Ferland and written by Evan Reilly and showrunner Glen Mazzara. The episode features the death of Shane Walsh, who was stabbed in the chest by Rick Grimes. Subsequently, Shane reanimates into a zombie and is later shot in the head by Carl Grimes. Initial talks of killing off the character commenced before the auditioning process of the series. Because of the short length of the first season of The Walking Dead, producers decided to retain the idea until the following season. Writer Robert Kirkman remarked: "We knew from Day 1 when we sat down in the writers' room to pull out the second season that this was going to be the season that Shane died. It was always about working toward that and building up that character and setting up this confrontation between Rick and Shane." Jon Bernthal admitted that he had no coaching prior to the scene, and said that many of the writers and cast members were divided on how to execute the sequence. "There was a lot of discussion going back and forth, a lot of arguing going back and forth on what that last scene actually should be — between myself and Andy and the writers. And everybody kind of got their own little say in what that last scene actually was." In his interview with Entertainment Weekly, Bernthal recalled the production of the scene:

We shot that scene all night long. And the entire cast came out and spent the entire night out on that field to be there for the last scene, and Jeff DeMunn [...] actually had been gone. He lives on a farm in upstate New York, and he had flown down and surprised me to be there for my last scene, which just touched me. And like I said, there was a lot of feeling about the last scene. The writers wanted it to be one way, the actors wanted it one way, the producers wanted it to be another way, I think everybody just sort of had their idea of what that scene should be, and it was just Andy and I in the woods walking out together, and Andy and I turned to each other and said, "You know what, man, this is you and me. Let's do this for you and me.”

Speculation related to Bernthal's release first surfaced in January 2012, when it was announced that he was negotiating with Frank Darabont to be a part of his upcoming television project L.A. Noir, which later became known as Mob City.

== Reception ==
=== Critical response ===
Zack Handlen writing for The A.V. Club rated the episode A− on an A to F scale. Eric Goldman at IGN gave the episode 8.5 out of 10.

=== Ratings ===
Upon its initial broadcast on March 11, 2012, "Better Angels" was watched by estimated 6.89 million viewers, up slightly from the previous episode.
