= Dale Horvath =

Fictional character

- The Walking Dead character
- Dale, as portrayed by Jeffrey DeMunn in the television series (left) and in the comic book series (right).
- First appearance: Comic: "Issue #3" (2003); Television: "Days Gone Bye" (2010)
- Last appearance: Comic: "Issue #66" (2009); Television: "Judge, Jury, Executioner" (2012)
- Created by: Robert Kirkman; Tony Moore
- Adapted by: Frank Darabont (The Walking Dead)
- Portrayed by: Jeffrey DeMunn

In-universe information
- Occupation: Comic: Retired salesman De Facto Leader of Rick's Group; Television: Pensioner; Look-out for the Atlanta Camp
- Spouses: Comic: Erma; Television: Irma Horvath
- Significant others: Comic: Andrea
- Children: Comic: Ben (adopted son); Billy (adopted son)

Dale (full name in the television series: Dale Horvath) is a fictional character from the comic book series The Walking Dead and was portrayed by Jeffrey DeMunn in the American television series of the same name. The character's death in the latter half of the second season of the show marks a significant departure from the comics, where Dale survived much longer. In both media, he is shown to be the group's primary moral center.

== Appearances ==
=== Comic book series ===
Prior to the zombie apocalypse, Dale worked as a salesman, and was married for almost 40 years to a woman named Erma. Following their individual retirements, the two had begun to travel the world together in Dale's newly purchased RV. However she died from cancer before the outbreak.

Dale is introduced as one of the survivors located in the camp where Lori and Carl Grimes are staying, on the outskirts of Atlanta, and his RV becomes the group's camp. When Lori's husband Rick arrives there, Dale tells him he does not trust Shane Walsh, and suspects that he has designs on Lori. Rick ignores him, dismissing Dale's suspicions as paranoia. Later, he saves Donna from being bitten by a walker by beheading it, and revealing that even beheading zombies does not fully kill them. Later one night during dinner, Dale reveals that, during his trip to Atlanta for safety, he had picked up the sisters Andrea and Amy. The discussion is interrupted when zombies attack the camp, which results in Amy's death. Dale comforts Andrea as she grieves. After Shane's death, Dale reveals that he knew all along that something was wrong, and that he was one of the few prior to Rick's arrival who wanted to relocate. Shane had refused and Dale only followed because Shane was "the law".

After burying Shane, the survivors set off in Dale's RV away from Atlanta, in an attempt to find somewhere safe. On the way, they run across Tyreese and his family while trying to move a car off the road for the RV to pass. The next night, Lori reveals to the camp that she is pregnant, which alarms Dale, who suspects the child may be Shane's, only to be quieted by Rick who suspects the same, but does not want to think that way at that moment. After this, they once again set off and end up at an estate that appears to be secure and safe, and spend the night. During the night, Donna stumbles upon Dale and Andrea having sex. The survivors remain on the move until Otis accidentally shoots Carl, and they end up on Hershel's farm, under the impression they are able to stay indefinitely. During their stay, Dale attempts to convince Andrea that he has accepted his wife's death and wants to devote his time to her from here on out.

After the group is forced off the farm, they discover a prison. After the group secures the prison, Dale is assigned to various tasks, from patrolling the area to working on repairing the fences. He begins to think that Andrea will not love him due to his age, but she reassures him that she will always want to be with him. Dale patches up both Andrea and Rick after minor incidents, reassuring Andrea that even if she is scarred, she will look pretty. Later, Dale begins to fear that someone else might discover the prison and try to take it from them, and begins to contemplate whether to stay, or leave; Andrea states that she will go where he goes. Dale begins to swap his old camper outfit for prison overalls like the other survivors, and assists Rick in searching blocks, eventually discovering the prison generator. Dale later begins to watch over everybody, including Allen's children, Ben and Billy, while their father is in a coma. After witnessing various dramatic situations unfold within the group, Dale forms a leadership committee with Tyreese and Hershel. The committee disempowers Rick due to his poor leadership. Dale and Andrea eventually become adoptive parents of Donna and Allen's orphaned children, twins Billy and Ben.

Eventually, Lori goes into labor. To keep the generator going, Dale and Billy set out into the car park in order to refuel the generator. During this task, Dale is bitten by a zombie and is only narrowly rescued by the arrival of the raid party, which quickly takes Dale back into the prison in order to amputate his leg so that he does not become a zombie. The leg is amputated correctly and Dale is saved.

As peace and stability return to the prison, Dale begins to suspect that Andrea is falling for Tyreese, who is closer to her age and does not have his disability. Dale's missing leg is replaced by a wooden peg, thanks to Andrea and Tyreese; after asking Tyreese to leave them be, Dale tells Andrea that she can leave him to be with Tyreese if she wants to. She assures Dale that she will always love him. Later that day, the peace ends with the arrival of the Governor and the townsmen of Woodbury. Dale and Andrea swear to protect the twins, no matter what. During the attack, Dale nurses a wounded Andrea and makes the decision to temporarily move out of the prison, accompanied by Glenn and Maggie, in order to protect Billy and Ben.

Dale, Andrea, Maggie, Glenn, Sophia and the twins relocate to Hershel's farm, where Dale intends to live out the rest of his life in peace. The arrival of three strangers - Abraham Ford, Rosita Espinosa, and Eugene Porter- prompts him to follow them in hopes of reaching Washington, DC. Unfortunately, tragedy strikes once again when Ben murders Billy, and Carl shoots Ben in retaliation. Distracted by the pain, Dale lets his guard down during a zombie attack and is bitten. He hides his wound to spare Andrea the knowledge of his impending death. When night falls, he leaves the van and disappears into the forest, only to be abducted by the mysterious Hunters. When Dale awakens, the leader, Chris, introduces himself and tells Dale that they are eating him piece by piece. However, Dale has the last laugh, as he is infected and will spread the disease to the hunters. Furious, the hunters beat him up and try to induce vomiting. They then leave Dale's unconscious body in front of Gabriel Stokes' church to use him as bait.

Dale is carried into the church by the other survivors, and is laid down in a bed. Dale explains his reason for hiding his bite to Andrea, and makes his peace with Rick, thanking him. Dale admits that while it is easy for the group to blame Rick for many of the deaths that occurred, they also have to credit him for being alive as well. Later that night, Dale passes away and Andrea shoots him in the head to prevent him from turning. Later as the survivors burn his corpse in front of the church, Rick thinks back on Dale fondly and admits that maybe Dale was the strongest of them all for holding on to his humanity until the end.

Dale's death makes a significant impact on Andrea, as she often wears Dale's hat in remembrance of him. The grief she carries leads her at one point to contemplate talking to the hat in an attempt to reach him in the afterlife, but she realizes his presence is not with her and opts against it. Her grief eventually sends her into the arms of Rick.

=== Television series ===
Dale (always depicted wearing a fisherman's bucket hat) had planned to spend his retirement traveling the country with his wife Irma in their RV, but she died from cancer before they were able to. Traveling on his own, he comes across Andrea and Amy during the outbreak and takes them in. Over time, he, Andrea, and Amy bond, and he finds their friendship invaluable in getting past the grief he has over Irma's death. Throughout the first season, Dale is shown to be a self-sufficient man, ever watchful of the changing dynamics among the survivors and is particularly protective of Andrea and Amy. He also provides the group with a variety of modern conveniences to make their situation more bearable.

==== Season 1 ====
Dale first appears in the series premiere "Days Gone Bye", where he is shown with Amy in the camp of survivors outside Atlanta, hearing Rick's calls over the radio but it does not get through and Dale insists Shane try but they are unable to reach him. Lori insists they put up signs to warn people away from Atlanta to prevent them going into the city, as it is overrun, and Dale supports this but Shane rejects it. In the episode "Guts", Dale keeps watch on the camp from the roof of his RV, and watches Carl while Lori scavenges for food, and later receives T-Dog's radio call from the rest of the group in Atlanta. In the episode "Tell It to the Frogs", Dale greets Rick and the others when they return to camp, and helps Glenn strip a car he had stolen. In the episode "Vatos", while on lookout Dale notices Jim inexplicably digging holes on the hillside and becomes concerned, bringing Shane, Lori, and others to talk to him. Jim cannot explain why he is digging but says it was because of a dream he had. Later, the campground is attacked by walkers, and Amy is among the camp members killed. Jim then recalls his dream and why he dug the holes – to bury their dead. In the episode "Wildfire", Daryl and Dale want to kill Jim after they learn he was bitten in the attack, but Rick stops them. Dale attempts to comfort Andrea after her sister's death by telling her how much having the two of them to take care of meant to him. Dale later witnesses Shane's temptation to kill Rick over Lori's affection but says nothing to the others. The group decides to travel to the CDC, and when Dale's RV breaks down along the way, Jim is left behind at his request. In the episode "TS-19", they find relative stability at the CDC for a brief time before the building is revealed to be connected to a timer, which will detonate the building. Dale is willing to stay behind with Andrea and die with her when she refuses to leave, but she is convinced at the last second to save both of their lives.

==== Season 2 ====
In the second-season premiere "What Lies Ahead", Dale is greatly concerned about Andrea's well-being following her suicide attempt, refusing to give her back her gun. At the same time, he is deeply invested in the search for Carol's daughter, Sophia, as evidenced by his lying to the group about the RV being broken (so that searching for her would be their primary focus). In the episode "Bloodletting", Dale believes that T-Dog has contracted a blood infection from a wound he received they search for antibiotics; Daryl eventually brings some antibiotics to them that Merle had in his stash of drugs. In the episode "Save the Last One", Andrea proves to Dale that her suicidal tendencies have diminished, and he returns her gun. In the episode "Cherokee Rose", Dale and the rest of the group arrive at Hershel's farm, and set up camp there. He helps the group try to retrieve a walker from a well, but the plan backfires. In the episode "Chupacabra", Andrea confuses Daryl for a walker, and shoots and injures him despite warnings from Dale. In the episode "Secrets", Dale's distrust of Shane begins to grow as he notices Shane's increasingly reckless behavior and dangerous influence he is putting on the group (most notably Andrea). Dale confronts Shane, but he threatens Dale. In the episode "Pretty Much Dead Already", Dale tries to hide the group's weapons, but Shane finds him in the swamp and retrieves them despite Dale's bluff to shoot Shane. Returning to the farm with the guns, Shane opens the barn that Hershel was hiding walkers in, and gets the rest of the group to shoot all the walkers. In the episode "Nebraska", Dale keeps an eye on Shane, and warns Lori about his suspicions that Shane killed Otis. In the episode "Triggerfinger", Dale tells Andrea that he feels Shane is dangerous but she does not believe him. In the episode "Judge, Jury, Executioner", Dale puts his issues with Shane aside when it comes to dealing with the fate of an outsider. Despite efforts to keep the group from murdering the outsider, he is outvoted and disgusted with the group's "survival of the fittest" mindset. Rick later changes his mind and chooses to spare the boy, but Dale never lives to learn this. During the night, he paces around the farm only to be ambushed and disemboweled by a walker Carl earlier encountered. In great pain and mortally wounded, he is shot in the head by Daryl as a mercy killing - an action Dale seems to approve of, as he raises his head to Rick's gun, that Daryl took gently from Rick's hand. Dale is buried in the episode "Better Angels" and, at his funeral, Rick vows to honor him by heeding his words, and retaining the group's humanity.

== Development and reception ==
=== Casting ===
Jeffrey DeMunn stars as Dale beginning in the first season of The Walking Dead. DeMunn had appeared in nearly all of Frank Darabont's films by the time he was selected as a member of the cast. Leonard Pierce of The A.V. Club in his review of "Guts", notes that Dale's RV "forms the center of the group's activities". Pierce notes in his review of "Tell It to the Frogs" that at the camp, between the characters, "the level of tension is obvious; only Dale is anything like a voice of wisdom, while little things like the brightness of a fire can set off a confrontation that never rises to the level of shouting, but has murder underneath it." John Serba of The Grand Rapids Press in his review for "Vatos" called Dale's "profound speech" at the campfire, about the importance of why he keeps track of time, paraphrasing Faulkner, one of the most memorable parts of the episode. In his review of "Wildfire", Leonard Pierce talks about the scene where Dale sees Shane pointing his rifle at Rick, commenting that "how much Dale sees, and how much he loses trust in him because of it, is an ugly unsettled question." Pierce, in his review for the first-season finale "TS-19", commented that "I suppose you could argue that the relationship between Dale and Andrea deepened as well, but it was so quick that it seemed a little perfunctory." Alan Sepinwall of HitFix described the performances of Jeffrey DeMunn and Laurie Holden as "great" during the scene where Dale found a way to convince Andrea not to give up and die. However, he did note that while Dale stayed for Andrea, "no such effort was made by anyone else for Jacqui, who never really got any character development and was there mainly so someone from the group could die with Jenner".

Frank Darabont, who left the show before season 2, had originally planned for the second-season premiere to include a flashback depicting how Dale met Andrea and Amy. Hank Stuever of The Washington Post, in his review of the second-season premiere "What Lies Ahead", cites Dale's delay in telling the group that he has fixed the RV's radiator to keep them focused on finding Sophia as an example of what is the core of the show: "the world is destroyed, and each episode seems as if it's avoiding the inevitable demise of everyone". Zack Handlen of The A.V. Club called the reveal that Dale repairing the RV was only him faking "great, because it's a twist that fits well with his character, and also makes him more likable". Handlen considered the scene in which Andrea confronts Dale regarding his actions at the CDC to be "a good, meaty scene for both of them. Andrea still wishes she'd been allowed to die, and Dale (who is probably the show's best character at this point) refuses to let anyone die if he can help it. It's an argument that doesn't tell us which side to pick, and it gives Andrea some strong arguments, arguments that are going to continue to be issues for every character in the show: Is it really worth it to stay alive in this kind of Hell?" Scott Meslow from The Atlantic in his review of "Bloodletting" complained about the "irritating, repetitive confrontation between Andrea and Dale over Dale's refusal to let Andrea commit suicide. The two characters argued and argued, saying the same things—"I saved your life" versus "it was my choice to make"—in four or five different ways." Meanwhile, Catherine Gee of The Daily Telegraph welcomed the introduction of Hershel, the "new old and wise chap Hershal (the vet) to rival our existing old and wise chap Dale". The Baltimore Sun journalist Andrew Conrad commented in his review of "Save the Last One" that the relationship between Dale and Andrea "continues to play out like that of an overbearing father and his icy teenage daughter". In his review of "Cherokee Rose", Conrad identifies the "best hug" as occurring when Rick reunites with Dale, calling it "The Babe Ruth of hugs". Darren Franich of Entertainment Weekly pointed out a flaw in Dale's reasoning that the group needed to remove the zombie from the well without contaminating the water: "I'm not sure how a couple months of bloated pustular ichor-seeping zombie flesh wouldn't have contaminated the water, but I suppose you can just boil that out."

Robert Kirkman commented on Shane possibly being involved in two love triangles as of "Secrets", saying "The relationship between Dale and Andrea hasn't really quite blossomed just yet, like it did in the comic book series. But there are certainly hints there that that may be something on the horizon. So, yeah, if you've got a relationship, Shane would like to screw it up!" Critics applauded the growing relationship between Andrea and Shane, as well as Dale's confrontation with Shane. Despite describing them as an "unlikely pairing", Scott Meslow of The Atlantic asserted that it was superior to the storyline between Andrea and Dale. "There's something to be said for the occasional post-apocalyptic tryst, which allows two characters who've experienced almost nothing but misery to have, even for a moment, something that resembles joy," he articulated. Meslow retorted that it was wise to underplay the tryst between Shane and Andrea, which he predicted would not lead to anything serious. Writing for Cinema Blend, Nick Venable wrote: "Dale's lack of personality traits, beyond being the wise sage who gets in everyone's business, makes him an unpredictable foe in my book, and could be as interesting as Shane's violent selfishness." Morgan Jeffrey of Digital Spy avouched that Shane continued to be an interesting character; "Just as we were beginning to like him again, he murdered Otis in cold blood. And it seems like his downward spiral is set to continue—he's threatening poor Dale and embarking on an ill-advised affair with Andrea."

Robert Kirkman responded to criticism that Dale trying hide the guns of everyone in the camp in "Pretty Much Dead Already" was a terrible plan: " Nobody's perfect! And, look, it's very important in this world to show people making mistakes. Dale had the best of intentions and was trying to make a tough situation go away to a certain extent. But, yeah, not the wisest move." Kirkman also commented more on Dale's relationship with Andrea: " It's a very nuanced relationship that we'll be exploring a lot in the coming episodes. He is fatherly toward her but he's being somewhat overbearing at times and it has pushed her away. She also has to recognize the different things he's gone through and what's informing those decisions and whether or not they will reconcile remains to be seen." Zack Handlen of The A.V. Club commented in his review of the episode that "the Dale/Shane conflict is heightened in order to drive the episode's final moments. It doesn't matter that Dale doesn't have enough confirmation for his suspicions to freak out to the degree he freaks out, or that the result of his apparent over-reaction is to make him look like the dangerous one, instead of Shane. What matters to the writers is getting the scene in place, justified or not." New York's Starlee Kine wondered "what the hell is Dale is talking about when he asks Shane, “Do you think these are going to keep us safe?” It's not like he caught his mom smoking and is hiding her cigarette stash for her own good." HitFix's Alan Sepinwall concluded that "no good was going to come of hiding all their guns in a remote part of the swamp. In this case, he's lucky Shane happened to be following him." Time journalist Nate Rawlings commented that "Dale went from wise old statesman to nosy kook and now folds like a cheap suit when Shane demands the guns back." Gina McIntyre of Los Angeles Times added that "had he shot Shane, he likely would have prevented the massacre at the farm". Writing for The Grand Rapids Press, John Serba opined that the "Dale-Shane uncomfortableness" was "just pointless mucking about".

Morgan Jeffrey of Digital Spy complimented Bernthal's performance in "Nebraska", while Josh Wigler of MTV celebrated his scene with DeMunn. Wigler summated: "Jon Bernthal and Jeffrey DeMunn are very likely the finest actors on The Walking Dead, and their increasingly tense interactions have been a highlight in recent episodes. 'Nebraska' was no exception, with Shane giving Dale an earful about 'Barnageddon' and why he did what he had to do." Zack Handlen writing for The A.V. Club commented in his review of "Triggerfinger" that "Dale was doing well for a while, but now he's on this quest to get Shane kicked out of the group, and that's all he has anymore".

=== Death ===
Dale has become the moral center of the group and especially in this episode for him to be going around and saying, "Let's retain our humanity," he's the last guy that's preaching that at this point with Rick making the decisions he has been making of late. To lose this guy at this moment means so much for this group. It's going to be such a monumental death that it's going to affect things a great deal moving forward. It seemed like the right time and that to me, all the stories that are going to come out of this that people haven't seen yet, are worth losing the Dale/Andrea relationship.

— Robert Kirkman

This episode "Judge, Jury, Executioner" addresses the death of Dale, who is attacked and ripped open by a walker. Since writer Robert Kirkman felt that Dale epitomized a character of morality and humanity, much of "Judge, Jury, Executioner" explores themes related to the declining morality of individuals during a catastrophic event. Kirkman proclaimed that Dale's death was a momentous occasion, ultimately marking a turning point for future development of The Walking Dead. "Dale's character has been the heart and soul of the show," he iterated. "He's definitely the moral compass. He's the guy that, more so than anyone, has been warning people to be careful how you let this world change you and monitoring what lengths people are going to survive. His loss is going to mean a great deal for all the characters in the show and is definitely going to represent a turn to a darker space. His death means a lot." Kirkman added that it was difficult to release DeMunn from the cast. He stated: "It's heartbreaking to lose Jeffrey DeMunn. He's really given us a lot, these last two seasons on the show. It's been amazing to work with him and get to know him and he's an awesome dude and we're definitely going to miss him."

However, in a 2018 interview with The Plain Dealer, DeMunn stated that he had asked for Dale to be killed off, following AMC's decision to fire Frank Darabont from the show. DeMunn had become friends with Darabont after being cast in Darabont's previous films. DeMunn stated "I was furious about how Frank was pushed out of the show. I spent a week not being able to take a full breath. And then I realized, 'Oh, I can quit.' So I called them and said, 'It's a zombie show. Kill me. I don't want to do this anymore.' It was an immense relief to me."

In the comic book series, Dale survives much longer, and he enters into a sexual relationship with Andrea. Kirkman asserted that it was necessary for writers to distance the development of Dale's television character from that in the comic: "I have talked many times how much I like the difference between the comics and the show. There are going to be big plot lines that we may not necessarily get to, like the romance between Dale and Andrea. If you think you really want to read that story line, that's available in the comics, and I highly recommend you pick those up. The show is always going to be a different animal and the decision to kill Dale off was a big one and it wasn't one that was made lightly."

Dale's death was adulated by commentators, who affirmed that it was a gruesome and emotional scene. Scott Meslow of The Atlantic suggested that because of his death, The Walking Dead embraced a more dark and sinister philosophy. He asserted, "Taken broadly, his death marks the death of a certain morality on the show, and the embrace of a philosophy that's something crueler and darker. Dale, unlike any of the other survivors, maintained his humanity to the very end of his waking life—but even he couldn't choose not to come back as something amoral and inhuman. In a world that seems utterly incapable of getting better, it's a none-too-reassuring sign that things will almost certainly get worse." Gina McIntyre of Los Angeles Times echoed synonymous thoughts: "It's left to Daryl to shoot the man to end his suffering, which is profoundly too bad. Without Dale to raise all those nagging concerns about doing what's right, zombie apocalypse or no zombie apocalypse, I fear for the future of this walker-infested world." Zack Handlen and Calgary Herald's Kimberly Potts thought that it was among the shocking moments in the series, while Wetpaint's Molly Friedman expressed that she was "riveted by the awesome attack [...] and filled with sadness, as the original gang watched their friend die a slow and painful death".

Handlen remarked: "It's a shocking scene, partially for its straight-forward gore, and partially for the astonished, uncomprehending expression on Dale's face. [...] This, right here, is the kind of sequence the show needs. There's too little sense of danger right now." Verne Gay of Newsday described the sequence as "violent", and ultimately summated that DeMunn's absence will be felt as the show progresses. However, Cyriaque Lamar of io9 professed that the writers should have written off Dale in a more respectable way; "That wasn't the way to off the show's most annoyingly sane character. Dale's redeeming quality was his ability to guilt everybody into paying lip service to rule of law; his weakness was his naïveté. Having an escaping Randall kill him would've offered some poetic symmetry. I'm not going to miss this character, but he deserved a better send-off." Time journalist Nate Rawlings drew allusions from Dale's attack to the episode title, commenting that "when the lone zombie we see in this episode tears open Dale's stomach, spilling the contents of his body onto the cold ground, we're reminded that the walkers are the judges, they're the jury, and this particular one was a most brutal executioner." Although he was shocked by the sequence, Eric Goldman of IGN assailed the earlier development of Dale in the episode, opining that he was obnoxious. Handlen felt that the character development of Carl Grimes was more stable that similar developments in the episode; "Using Carl to both resolve the episode's plot, and making him semi-responsible for Dale's death, has a satisfying neatness, and serves as a reminder that for all their talk, Rick and the group have no idea what impact their choices will make." Josh Jackson of Paste commented on Carl's reaction to the death of Dale, saying that despite a gradual change to a dark nature, he "realizes [...] that he's still very much a kid".

Noel Murray of Rolling Stone ranked Dale Horvath 17th in a list of 30 best Walking Dead characters, saying, "He's been forgotten somewhat as the saga has rolled on without him, but for the show's first two seasons, Dale was the conscience of the series, always urging Rick and the rest of their band of survivors to think in terms of a greater moral good. With his scruffy beard, fishing hat and willingness to call people out for their mistakes, the character (and actor Jeffrey DeMunn) helped anchor the early version of the show, when cooperation still outpaced conflict."
