= Sophia Peletier =

Fictional character from The Walking Dead

Sophia
- The Walking Dead character
- Sophia, as portrayed by Madison Lintz in the television series (left) and as depicted in the comic book series (right).
- First appearance: Comic: Issue #2 (2003); Television: "Tell It to the Frogs" (2010)
- Last appearance: Comic: Issue #193 (2019); Television: "Nebraska" (2012)
- Created by: Robert Kirkman; Tony Moore
- Adapted by: Frank Darabont; Charles H. Eglee; Jack LoGiudice
- Portrayed by: Madison Lintz

In-universe information
- Occupation: Assumed grade school student Writer
- Family: Carol (mother); Ed (father) (named only in the television series); Comic: Glenn (adoptive father); Maggie Greene (adoptive mother); Hershel Rhee (adoptive brother); Rick Grimes (father-in-law); Lori Grimes (mother-in-law); Andrea (stepmother-in-law)
- Spouses: Comic: Carl Grimes Boyfriend later husband only Comic best friend only TV Series
- Children: Comic: Andrea Grimes II

Sophia Grimes (née unknown, Sophia Peletier in television series) is a fictional character from the comic series The Walking Dead and was portrayed by Madison Lintz in the television series of the same name. She is the daughter of Carol, who is fiercely protective of her, as is Carl Grimes, with whom she becomes close friends during the zombie outbreak. She becomes a major focal point in both media, despite her limited involvement in many of the central conflicts faced by the other characters.

In the comics, Sophia is a member of the Atlanta refugee camp and becomes close friends with Carl, with whom she spends most of her time – eventually becoming his girlfriend. Later, after her mother's suicide, she begins viewing Maggie and Glenn as her parents while remaining close to Carl. Sophia chooses to break up with Carl because of the overrun world around them and their conflicting personalities, although they remain close friends and Carl is shown to be extremely protective of her. Sophia also becomes a resident of the Alexandria Safe-Zone and later the Hilltop Colony. She is the comic's longest-surviving female character.

In the television series, Sophia is abused by her father Ed, as is Carol. After Ed's death and the departure from the Atlanta camp, Sophia goes missing near the Greene farm and her rescue becomes the driving force of the first half of season 2. She is missing for a while until they open the barn on the farm and find Sophia inside, as a walker. Rick is then forced to shoot her in the head, killing her.

== Appearances ==
=== Comic book series ===
Sophia is introduced in issue #2 at the initial camp established by survivors of the outbreak on the outskirts of the city of Atlanta, now overrun by walkers. She is seen playing with Carl Grimes and a pair of twins named Billy and Ben, and witnesses Carl and his mother Lori reunite with his father, Rick. With the group under Rick's guidance following Shane's death, they arrive at an abandoned, gated community named Wiltshire Estates. The group begins to settle there, and Sophia, her mother Carol, and the rest of the group briefly enjoy living in houses and sleeping in beds (as opposed to Dale's crowded RV in which the group had spent the entire winter). However, the group soon discovers that, upon closer examination, the area is itself overrun; the death of Ben and Billy's mother Donna occurs as a result. They are briefly welcomed onto the farm of Hershel Greene after Carl is shot by his neighbor Otis and taken there to be operated on. Following Carl's recovery, the group leaves Hershel's property and again presses their luck on the road.

After spending a good deal of time traveling, the group comes upon an abandoned prison, which they clear of walkers and subsequently settle into. Sophia moved into a cell with Carol and her lover Tyreese, whom the group had rescued a while before discovering Wiltshire Estates. One day, while Sophia is playing cards with Carl, she asks him a question about his card and then if he would like to be her boyfriend. He rejects her offer, and the two continue on playing. When a newcomer named Michonne arrives at the prison, she begins to develop feelings for Tyreese, which Carol notices with great discomfort. Soon, they engage in sexual intercourse, as Carol sadly discovers from a distance. Because of this, Sophia receives very little attention from her mother and is subsequently traumatized when she attempts suicide directly in front of her.

Carol's downward spiral ultimately reaches a breaking point, which causes her to attempt suicide once again. She approaches and begins talking to a walker another newcomer named Alice had been using for research, and then steps closer and allows it to bite her. She is put down by Andrea, and later buried in the prison yard, where Sophia mourns her mother's loss. Sophia remains in a catatonic state for a long time afterward. As life becomes increasingly dangerous for the group, Andrea and Dale break away from the group, taking Sophia, Ben, Billy, Hershel's daughter Maggie and Glenn along with them. Following this decision, a rival community named Woodbury, which wants to take the prison for itself, storms an attack on the group and successfully kills everyone except Rick, Carl and Michonne. The three of them return to Hershel's farm to discover the rest of the group living there. While reunited, Sophia refers to Maggie as her "mother" to Carl, much to his confusion.

A group of survivors soon shows up on the farm, one of them claiming to be a scientist who knows how he can stop the outbreak and is on his way to Washington, D.C. to develop the cure. This sends the group on the road again. On the way, the scientist, Eugine, is revealed to have been lying about knowing a cure (having only made it up so that he would be protected). They are met by a man named Aaron, who claims he can take them to a safe community in Alexandria, nearby Washington, D.C. Rick trusts him, and soon they are all allowed to live in the Alexandria Safe Zone. Sophia shares a house with Glenn, Maggie, and Andrea. She adjusts well to her new environment and even participates in a Halloween event put on by the community's leader, Douglas Monroe. During this time she also begins to call Glenn her father; however, when she overcomes her fears established by the world outside, she admits to him and Maggie that she knows they aren't her real parents, and also begins to acknowledge Carol's previous existence.

After a man who calls himself "Jesus" arrives and proposes organizing a trade with the Alexandria Safe-Zone with his thriving community on a hilltop, the group heads up there, only to be stopped by a group of hostile people who refer to themselves as "The Saviors" and their leader, Negan. Since Rick's group had killed so many of his men (albeit, in self-defense), Negan demands a sacrifice of one of their people. He ultimately chooses Glenn, and brutally beats him to death with his baseball bat which he calls "Lucille". He tells them they have one week to give him half their supplies or risk repeating the tragedy that has just unfolded. Devastated, Maggie repeatedly punches Rick in the face for not doing anything; this prompts Carl to point his gun at her so she would stop, which in turn causes Sophia to lash out at him and bite his arm. Carl walks up to Sophia later on and apologizes for her "dad's" death. She begins to believe it is somehow her fault that everyone in her family dies, but Carl assures her that that's "just the way it is" now.

Glenn's body is buried at the Hilltop Colony, where he and Maggie had previously discussed moving to with Sophia and their soon-to-be-born child. Sophia gives Carl a tearful goodbye and hugs him, and she and Maggie ultimately do move to the Hilltop Colony while the others return to the Alexandria Safe Zone. She later expresses displeasure with the idea of remaining at the Hilltop Colony long-term to Maggie; however, this seems to change after she befriends the (currently unnamed) son of Hilltop resident Brianna (a new friend of Maggie's).

Sometime later, Maggie becomes the de facto leader of the Hilltop Colony (having overthrown the previous leader, Gregory). She brings the majority of the people from the Hilltop to Alexandria, including many children (Sophia being among them), only to learn that much of Alexandria has been destroyed in an attack by the Saviors.

Sophia is still alive and well to date at the Hilltop Colony, and is also the only remaining survivor of the Atlanta group, besides Rick and Carl. After Rick's death, she becomes Carl's wife and begins a family with him.

=== Television series ===
Sophia, along with her mother Carol (Melissa McBride) and her father Ed (Adam Minarovich), are staying at the camp formed by a relatively large group of survivors outside of Atlanta. As it was revealed in a flashback in the season two episode "Chupacabra", Ed brought Carol and Sophia with him while moving toward a "safe zone" on the outskirts of the city. They meet up with Shane Walsh (Jon Bernthal), Lori Grimes (Sarah Wayne Callies), and her son Carl (Chandler Riggs), whom Sophia quickly becomes close friends with. The six of them decide to make it together, and stumble upon the camp set up by Dale Horvath (Jeffrey DeMunn). She and Carl befriend two children named Louis (Noah Lomax) and Eliza (Maddy Lomax), the son and daughter of a man known as Morales (Juan Gabriel Pareja) and his wife Miranda.

==== Season 1 ====
Sophia is first introduced in the episode "Tell It to the Frogs", where it is revealed that Ed abuses Carol, slapping her across the face for not coming with him right away. Disgusted, Shane beats Ed to a pulp and threatens to kill him if he lays his hand on Carol, Sophia, or anyone else in the camp. In the next episode, "Vatos", Ed's injuries are revealed to have confined him to his tent, and so during dinner, he implores Sophia to stay with him and keep him company in an inappropriate, quasi-sexual manner. However, Carol stands up for her daughter and says that Sophia wants to join everyone else. Towards the end of the episode, a herd of walkers kills several people, including Ed and Amy (Emma Bell), before Shane and Rick Grimes (Andrew Lincoln) destroy them.

In the episode "Wildfire", Rick decides to lead the group away from the current site and travel to the Centers for Disease Control (CDC) because of its assumed security and to possibly find a cure for Jim (Andrew Rothenberg), a survivor who had been bitten when the camp was attacked. Morales announces that his family will be leaving the group to find family in Alabama. Sophia, who had befriended Eliza, is saddened by her leaving, so Eliza gives her her doll as a goodbye present. Sophia and Carol appear to have become more enthusiastic and open members of the group following Ed's death. They travel with the rest of the group to the CDC.

In the first-season finale "TS-19", the sole remaining CDC worker, Dr. Edwin Jenner (Noah Emmerich), reluctantly agrees to let them all in. While there, Sophia and the others are briefly introduced to the many luxuries the CDC has to offer, such as delicious food, hot showers, and a recreation room full of games and toys she and Carl can play with. However, it is soon revealed that Jenner had locked them inside the CDC, which was going to self-destruct when a timer ran out. Sophia immediately begins to cry, and Carol pleads with Jenner to let them all go, saying that Sophia does not deserve to die in such a manner. Jenner finally lets them go with just minutes to spare.

==== Season 2 ====
In the premiere, "What Lies Ahead", the group is stopped on a vehicle-jammed highway, where they stop to loot abandoned cars for supplies and new clothes. In the process, a massive herd of walkers forces the group to take cover underneath the cars. Sophia is separated from Carol and is discovered by two walkers. She runs away from them, with Eliza's doll in her arms. Rick runs after her and carries her to a safe spot in the nearby woods so he can go and kill the walkers. He does so successfully, but when he comes back, Sophia is nowhere to be found. The group goes on a search for her, but finds no trace of her. They come upon a church, and while there, Carol stops and prays to the figure of Jesus on the Cross. She says that even though she prayed for Ed's death for abusing her and "looking" at Sophia, her punishment should not be Sophia's death. This implies that Ed had incestuous feelings toward his daughter, although it is left ambiguous whether he acted on them.

The group keeps searching for Sophia but is unsuccessful. In the episode "Cherokee Rose", Carl's injuries ultimately lead the whole group onto Hershel Greene's (Scott Wilson) farm, where they settle. They continue their search, but still, nothing seems to turn up. In the episode "Chupacabra", the only thing that comes to light is Sophia's doll, which had been discovered by Daryl Dixon (Norman Reedus). Daryl goes on several searches for Sophia, being one of the most devoted members of the group in looking towards recovering her. He and Carol bond greatly because of his efforts. In the mid-season finale "Pretty Much Dead Already", Glenn Rhee (Steven Yeun) tells the group that he discovered that Hershel has been keeping a group of walkers, consisting largely of his family and neighbors, in his barn, as he had believed them to be sick but curable patients. Shane goes against Rick's orders, opens the barn, and (along with the rest of the group) shoots all the walkers who stumble out. Just as things seem to be over and done with, one more walker stumbles out of the barn – Sophia, who had been bitten while in the woods. Knowing what must be done, Rick steps forward and shoots her, putting her out of her misery. In the mid-season premiere "Nebraska", she is buried in a funeral ceremony, alongside Hershel's second wife Annette, and stepson Shawn (who were also kept in his barn as walkers). Carol does not attend the funeral, saying that her daughter "died a long time ago".

=== The Walking Dead: Daryl Dixon ===
While in Maine, Carol has a flashback of a zombified Sophia emerging from Hershel's barn which turns into a hallucination of Sophia approaching her mother and touching her arm. Carol lies to Ash Patel that Sophia was taken to France by her father just before the world ended in order to get Ash to fly her across the ocean so that Carol can search for the missing Daryl Dixon.

== Development and reception ==
Gina McIntyre of the Los Angeles Times referred to the second season premiere "What Lies Ahead" as "thrilling" and "heart-wrenching", citing Sophia's disappearance and the shooting of Carl. Derek Boeckelmann of Daily Nexus commended the suspenseful sequences of the episode, stating that "the show wisely puts both Carl and Sophia, the youngest survivors, on the edge of peril many times" in the episode. Zack Handlen of The A.V. Club felt that Sophia's disappearance was contrived. Paste's Josh Jackson felt that the side-plot of the continued search for Sophia takes a backseat to the events with Rick's family at the farmhouse in "Bloodletting". HitFix's Alan Sepinwall commented in his review of "Save the Last One" that with all the time spent waiting in that traffic jam while searching for Sophia, "the show and its characters seem to be heading nowhere fast". Mark Maurer of The Star-Ledger opined that the search for Sophia had gone on long enough, and that the next episode would be the best time for her to come back. Nate Rawlings of Time commented on the situation with the still-lost Sophia that the show "really knows how to drag out a situation, doesn’t it?"

Time journalist Nate Rawlings complained in his review of "Cherokee Rose" that Sophia had been "missing for a month now in what has become an incredibly dragged out subplot". Andrew Conrad of The Baltimore Sun pondered: "And when are they going to wrap up this whole Sophia thing? I'm ready for them either to find her as a little zombie girl and do the thing that must be done, have a joyous reunion, or just let that whole subplot die. But please, stop dragging it out!" Zach Handlen of The A.V. Club commented on Sophia's predicament: "At this point, her being gone has turned into one of those jokes that goes on so long that it stops being funny, then keeps going, and at some point may actually start being funny--or interesting--again." Darren Franich of Entertainment Weekly commented that if Sophia turns out to be a zombie, "we're all going to laugh, and laugh, and cry, and laugh". Nick Venable of Cinema Blend found himself "aghast" that the show still considered the plotline regarding the search for Sophia something worth coming back to: "What little sympathy I had for Carol’s character has been replaced with an eternal yawn. If Sophia returns in a way that resembles anything normal without fanfare, I’m seeking out a real little girl named Sophia, and I’m going to punch her in the face."

Despite being initially surprised about her character's being killed off in "Pretty Much Dead Already", actress Madison Lintz concluded that she understood its aftermath for the show. Lintz affirmed that portraying a walker was a welcoming experience for her, and stated that she was "going to look back on and say that was amazing." Lintz learned what would happen to Sophia "about a month before we shot it, which was good, because sometimes they just let you find things out from reading the script, so that was fortunate. [Executive producer] Gale Ann Hurd actually called and told us. I was sad because I wouldn't be able to see everybody every day after that, but it turned out really well. I didn't really know it was going to be that big a deal, though." Robert Kirkman felt that killing Sophia would add more dimension to the show, as well as add more flexibility to its storyline progression. "When a good idea comes up, you have to go with it," he articulated. "Sophia is a character who is still alive in the comic book series and who has contributed quite a bit to the overall narrative and informed a lot of story lines for a lot of different characters. Having Carol [...] survive her daughter as opposed to the other way around as it is in the comics is going to lead to interesting but different stories."

Janet Turley of The Huffington Post asserted that the episode's concluding scene involving Sophia's death was "fiction not afraid to provoke", while Eric Goldman of IGN described it as an "absolutely horrific scenario". CNN's Henry Hanks opined that the sequence "left [them] with a final scene that we'll be talking about until then." New York's Starlee Kine asserted that it contained cinematic qualities, and felt that the scene was "satisfying, sad, and fun". She wrote: "It was everything you've ever wanted this show to be. Zombies plus no dialogue, such a winning combination! And how great was it that Sophia was dead instead of impossibly alive somewhere, holed up with Merle or Morgan or those warmhearted gang members in Atlanta? And because she was granted more screen time than she ever was when she was alive, we were finally able to care about the loss of her short, young life." Jen Chaney of The Washington Post echoed synonymous sentiments; "Really, the final moments of the last episode before the AMC series' December/January hiatus played like a fireworks finale on the Fourth of July, assuming your Fourth of July celebrations typically involve zombies and a pile of corpses." Time journalist Nate Rawlings concluded that it was the perfect resolution for what he called "television's slowest subplot". Gina McIntyre of the Los Angeles Times felt that the concluding sequence was "the most eventful moment" of the episode, and stated that it was difficult to watch.

Ken Tucker of Entertainment Weekly affirmed that the scene reestablished The Walking Dead to full form, as well as redeemed the season's "general gutlessness thus far." HitFix's Alan Sepinwall reflected similar thoughts, and observed that it was effective enough to keep the viewers chattering until the succeeding episode. Zack Handlen of The A.V. Club summated: "The Sophia reveal is a punch in the gut, because narrative fiction teaches us the longer someone stays missing, the better the chance they'll turn up alive; otherwise, where would the drama be? By using the little girl in this way, the show transforms what should've been anti-climax into a reinvention of an entire storyline. It's not enough to make the bad parts of the earlier episodes great, but it does show that the writers had more on their mind than stalling." Mark Maurer of The Star-Ledger felt that albeit predictable, the segment was "well executed". Josh Wigler of MTV said that the storyline ended in "a much darker way than anyone could have imagined."

Los Angeles Times' Gina McIntyre notes in her review of "Nebraska" that the episode opens with "Rick and the others paralyzed by the realization that Sophia is not only beyond saving, but that she's been nearby the whole time". HitFix writer Alan Sepinwall describes how the opening scene, "picking up seconds after Rick put a bullet through the thing that used to be Sophia, was great: the emotion felt every bit as palpable as it was at the end of November". However, he stated that although the show made him "feel the weight of Sophia's loss in that moment where she walked out of the barn in November, once things went quieter, she went back to being a non-entity. (When Glenn lamented that they had lost others, but, "This was Sophia," I wondered if perhaps he was speaking of an alternate version of the show where Carol and Sophia were the main characters and Carl was only relevant as Sophia's occasional playmate.)" The Atlantic's Scott Meslow commented: "It's clear from "Nebraska" that The Walking Dead was banking on us caring about Sophia's death - a tall order, since she'd had nothing but quiet, unmemorable screen time before her disappearance, and kept our heroes from leaving the farm to do something more interesting after. But if the show's viewers aren't mourning Sophia's death, its characters are, with reactions ranging from striking (Daryl's impotent, barely contained rage) to melodramatic (Carol sobbing and ripping up Cherokee roses, in a none-too-subtle callback to an earlier episode)."
