= Cherokee Rose (The Walking Dead) =

- The Walking Dead episode
- Maggie and Glenn head to the pharmacy to restock the group's medical supplies.
- Episode no.: Season 2 Episode 4
- Directed by: Billy Gierhart
- Written by: Evan Reilly
- Cinematography by: David Boyd
- Editing by: Julius Ramsay
- Original air date: November 6, 2011

Guest appearances
- IronE Singleton as Theodore "T-Dog" Douglas; Lauren Cohan as Maggie Greene; Emily Kinney as Beth Greene; Scott Wilson as Hershel Greene; Jane McNeill as Patricia; James Allen McCune as Jimmy; Brian Keith Hillard as Bloated Well Walker

Episode chronology
← Previous "Save the Last One"	Next → "Chupacabra"
- The Walking Dead season 2

"Cherokee Rose" is the fourth episode of the second season of the post-apocalyptic horror television series The Walking Dead, and the 10th overall episode of the series. Written by Evan Reilly and directed by Billy Gierhart, this episode, named after the Georgia state flower and a legendary symbol of the Trail of Tears, aired on AMC in the United States on November 6, 2011. The survivors are given a temporary sanctuary at the farm of Hershel Greene (Scott Wilson) While the group contemplates what to do, Daryl Dixon (Norman Reedus) continues to search for Sophia Peletier (Madison Lintz).

Major themes in "Cherokee Rose" include Daryl Dixon's gradual change into a lighter character and the beginning of his close relationship with Carol Peletier and the developing romantic relationship between Maggie and Glenn. Principal photography for the episode commenced in Coweta County, Georgia, where filming locations were set up in an abandoned late nineteenth century Gothic revival home in Senoia, Georgia and in downtown Sharpsburg, Georgia.

During a sequence in the episode, the survivors pull a bloated zombie—commonly referred to by the group as a "walker"—out of a water well, ultimately leading to the walker splitting apart. Greg Melton, the series' production designer, collaborated with KNB Efx Group in producing the scene. Filming for the sequence arose over an approximate period of two days.

"Cherokee Rose" was well received by television critics, who praised the episode's storylines and character development. Upon initial airing, it garnered 6.29 million viewers and attained a 3.4 rating in the 18-49 demographic, according to Nielsen ratings. "Cherokee Rose" became the highest-rated cable program of the day, as well as the second highest-rated cable program of the week.

== Plot ==
Carl Grimes recovers from his operation to remove fragments of a bullet, which he had received earlier when encountering a deer. He asks his father Rick if his friend Sophia Peletier is alright. Since Sophia is still missing, Rick reluctantly lies to Carl and tells him that she is fine. Dale Horvath, Daryl Dixon, Andrea, and Carol Peletier move the vehicles and set up camp at the Greene home and are introduced to the Greene family. There, they lead a funeral procession for their ranch hand, Otis. Shane Walsh is asked to share Otis' final moments; Shane sticks to his lie that Otis had sacrificed his life to save Carl, while in reality Shane sacrificed Otis.

Along with Hershel Greene and his daughter Maggie, the group organize Sophia's search. Since Shane is still injured and Rick is too weak from blood loss, Daryl ventures out on his own. Daryl eventually finds an abandoned house, but does not locate Sophia. He finds a cherokee rose, which he describes as a sign to uplift mothers' spirits associated with the Trail of Tears, and gives it to Carol.

Maggie asks the group for help removing a bloated walker that fell into a freshwater well before it contaminates the water. After unsuccessfully using food as bait, Glenn is lowered down as live bait but the others lose their grip on the rope, causing Glenn's legs to be grabbed by the Bloated Zombie, causing him to panic. Glenn is managed to be pulled out, having put the rope on the walker. The group pulls the walker out, but to everyone's dismay, its body is ripped in half, its lower half falling back into the well and contaminating it. Maggie and Glenn decide to venture to the local pharmacy to find more supplies. Before he leaves, Lori asks Glenn to find a pregnancy test for her. At the pharmacy, Glenn finds the pregnancy test, and afterward finds a bag of condoms, which he is caught holding by Maggie. Not able to explain himself, Maggie believes they were for her, and the pair have sex.

Rick and Hershel tour the farmland, where Hershel reveals that the group has to leave once Carl fully recovers. Rick manages to convince Hershel for the group to stay in the meantime. However, there are rules they must follow. Rick pleads with Hershel to not force them to leave and to reconsider his request.

Later on, Rick is up in the room where Carl is recovering in bed. Once Carl wakes up, Rick admits that he lied to him about Sophia; Carl reveals that his mother already told him the truth. Meanwhile, the pregnancy test reveals that Lori is pregnant.

== Production ==
That’s more of a comment on America as a whole and television's standards and practices than it is on us. It is kind of absurd that in an episode where you see the inside of a bloated, water-logged corpse, you can't see so much as a butt cheek. That's the world we’re living in. But I think it's important to view the relationship between Maggie and Glenn in a certain light. I don’t think we wanted to turn that into some kind of steamy, pornographic sex romp.

— Robert Kirkman

"Cherokee Rose" was written by Evan Reilly and directed by Billy Gierhart. Filming for the episode occurred in downtown Sharpsburg, Georgia on August 1, 2011. Preparation for filming initiated in July 2011, when producers converted an empty building into a temporary drug store. Herb Bridges, who owned the building at the time, was first contacted by producers of the series' in January 2011, and again four months later in May. Bridges informed them that the space would be rented by a woman who would open a children's store there; however, she had not moved into the space yet. This episode contains a scene in which Daryl searches for Sophia in an abandoned home. Filming for the scene transpired at an abandoned late-nineteenth century Gothic revival home in Senoia, Georgia. Gregory Melton, the series' production designer, was the first crew member to locate the house. Melton took a picture of it with his cell phone, and sent the picture to creator Frank Darabont. Darabont reacted positively to the image, and later wrote it in the episode's script.

This episode marked the consummation of the relationship between Maggie Greene and Glenn, in which they engage in sexual intercourse at a pharmacy. Writer Robert Kirkman insisted that it was important to view the storyline in a different perspective, explaining, "I don't think we wanted to turn that into some kind of steamy, pornographic sex romp." "Cherokee Rose" marked a turning point in the character development of Daryl Dixon. It contains a monologue that references the cherokee rose and its association to the Trail of Tears. The scene was devised and written by Evan Rielly. "I was actually on set during the filming of that," stated Kirkman. "Almost every actor in the cast showed up, because they absolutely loved that scene and they wanted to see Melissa and Norman’s portrayal of it as it unfolded."

The episode contains a scene in which the survivors pull a bloated walker out of a well in order to prevent contamination of the water. Such attempts prove to be unsuccessful, as all of the water retention severs the walker in half. Greg Nicotero, the special effects director for The Walking Dead, collaborated with KNB Efx Group to produce the sequence. Nicotero received a phone call from staff members of the company two hours after leaving production offices. They devised and expressed plans of creating a scenario in which a walker falls into a well. Nicotero worked with KNB Efx Group in several other films in the past. "One of the things we've noticed—looking at some morgue research and cadaver research—is that everything gets really swollen," he articulated. "The liquid saturates the skin so much that it swells up, and the skin starts to split. That was one of the things that we really wanted to play up." A costume was sculpted using a body and a head cast. It was composed of three layers; a thin skin-like substance covers the exterior of the suit, followed by a layer of silicone and a layer of foam in the costume's center. A mask that was previously utilized in the action horror film Grindhouse (2007) was used as part of the costume. Nicotero inserted water balloons between the silicone and foam layering. He explained that as the performer begins to move, the liquid transfers from one side of the costume to another. Nicotero added: "If we made it out of foam latex, it would've been stiff. But we used silicone that was heavily plasticized—which means that the silicone was really soft." The suit weighed approximately sixty pounds.

Brian Hilliard, a member of the KNB Efx Group, was chosen by producers as the walker. Hilliard was favored in lieu of another actor, who fell ill shortly after being cast. In his interview with Entertainment Weekly, Greg Nicotero explained why he chose Hilliard for the part:

I needed somebody who could perform, and who also had a lot of endurance, because we were shooting in Atlanta at the end of July. Silicone doesn’t have cell structure, like foam does. It doesn’t breathe. So Brian was basically encased in a sixty-pound wet-suit. Every part of his body was covered. He had facial prosthetics, hands, full legs, feet. It was all glued down. It wasn’t like we could take him out between takes. He was in.

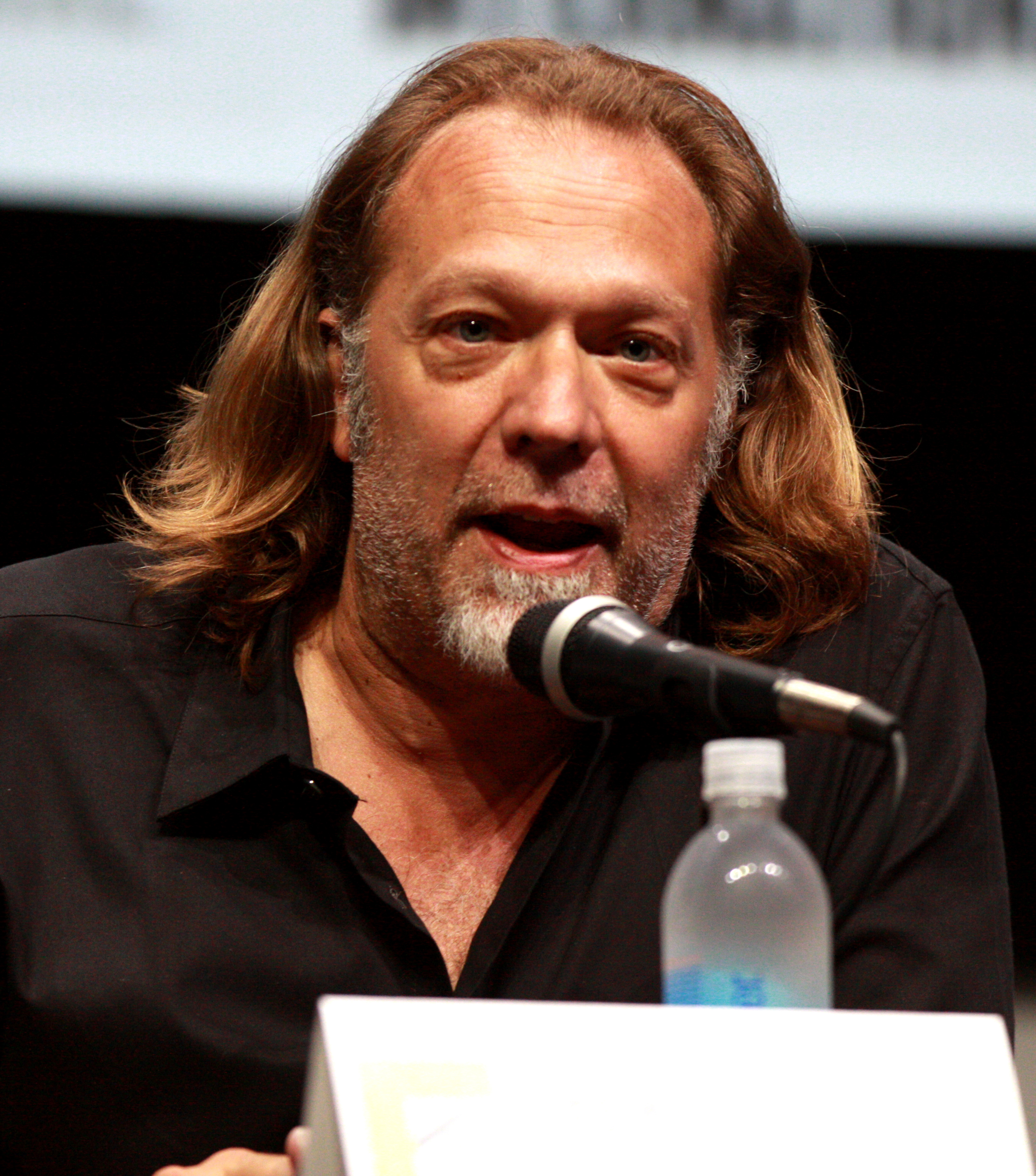
Greg Nicotero (pictured) collaborated with KNB Efx Group to produce the well sequence.

The sequence was shot over a period of two days. Principal photography on the first day commenced inside a well, which was built by Gregory Melton in approximately four weeks. It measured over forty feet in height, and the base of the well was located in a swimming pool. Nicotero stated that "[they] could open the door, put the zombie actor in there, then close the door. The camera would shoot down." Atop of the well was a lip that measured a height of six feet. Despite putting slime and K-Y Jelly on a board inside of the well, Nicotero and his production team found the particular sequence to be difficult to shoot. "On 'action', we pulled him out, and he slid up and over the lip," Nicotero stated. "It was challenging to get all those pieces to come together on a television schedule." By the time Hilliard was pulled out of the well, producers used a second suit equipped with prosthetic legs and prosthetic body. Various blood bags were inserted in the torso of the suit; each were filled with viscous liquids in a variety of colors. Entrails were lastly added inside the suit, as Nicotero asserted that his team wanted "a gigantic explosion of gore."

To induce the splitting of the costume, the series' special effect coordinator Darrell Pritchett inserted squibs inside of the suit. Nicotero stated: "On 'action', my makeup effects crew pulled the upper body apart, and the physical effects crew squibbed all the bags. Then visual effects guys went in and added those few little tendrils of stretching, ripping intestines." Because rubber constituted a large percentage of the suit, weights were added on to ensure that it would sink in the water. While recording commenced, approximately 12–15 gallons of liquid were poured into the well following the dropping of the prosthetic legs. Four takes were produced of that sequence.

== Reception ==
=== Ratings ===
"Cherokee Rose" was originally broadcast on November 6, 2011 in the United States on AMC. Upon airing, the episode garnered 6.29 million viewers and attained a 3.4 rating in the 18-49 demographic, according to Nielsen ratings. It became the highest-rated cable program of the day, obtaining significantly higher ratings than Hell on Wheels on AMC and the Real Housewives of Atlanta on Bravo. "Cherokee Rose" was the second highest-rated cable program of the week, edging out television movie John Sandford's Certain Prey by a considerable margin, but attained lower ratings than a match between the San Diego Chargers and the Kansas City Chiefs as part of the 2011 NFL season. The episode's total viewership and ratings moderately increased from the previous episode, "Save the Last One", which was viewed by 6.095 million viewers and achieved a 3.1 rating in the 18-49 demographic. In the United Kingdom, "Cherokee Rose" received 893,000 viewers, subsequently becoming the highest-rated cable program on FX of the week dated November 13.

=== Critical response ===
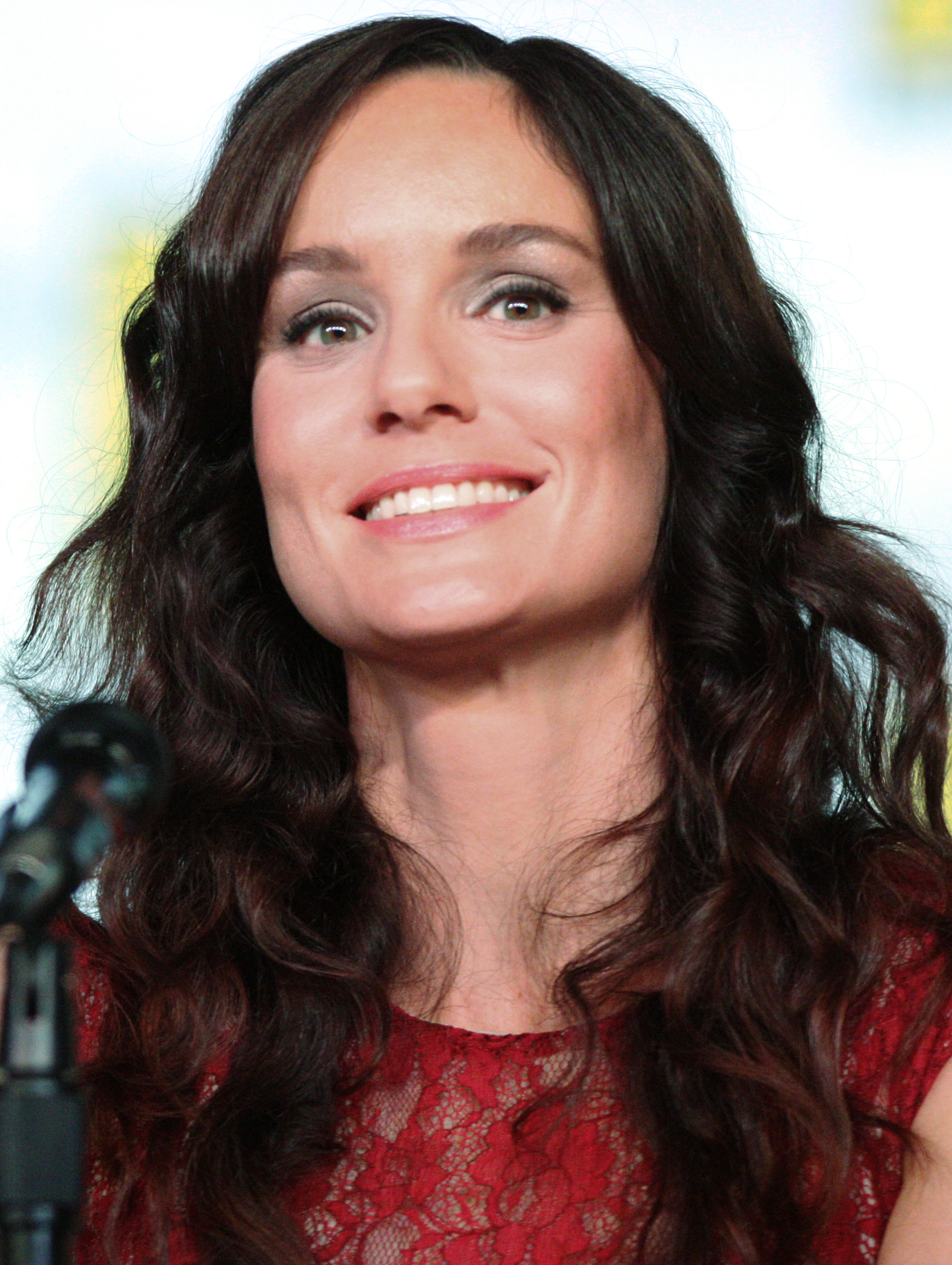
The conclusion sequence involving Lori Grimes (Sarah Wayne Callies, pictured) was well received by critics.

"Cherokee Rose" attained favorable reviews from television critics. Zach Handlen of The A.V. Club gave the episode a B+, and felt that it gave an accurate depiction of the characters. He opined: "I had a problem with the show's tendency to wander into cul-de-sacs in the first season, mainly because so much of it felt redundant, the work of writers who had no real idea how to construct narrative television. But this season, I'm starting to think they're getting a handle on things, and "Cherokee Rose" is the sort of episode I'd like to see more off [sic] as The Walking Dead continues." Paste's Josh Jackson asserted that the episode was superior to preceding installments, describing it as "simply a catch of breath." Similarly, Josh Wigler of MTV evaluated that despite less violence than usual, the quality of "Cherokee Rose" improved from the previous episode. HitFix's Alan Sepinwall echoed analogous sentiments, and argued that while the show's character still need more development, the development displayed in the episode was a "definite step in the right direction on that front." Time journalist Nate Rawlings concluded that the episode contained many powerful scenes. Eric Goldman of IGN was critical of the episode, ultimately giving it a seven out of ten rating, signifying a "good" rating. Goldman felt that "Cherokee Rose" was a disappointment, citing that it lack any focus or direction. Henry Hanks, writing for CNN, said that the episode was the weakest of the season.

Critics commended the development of the relationship between Maggie Green and Glenn. Andrew Conrad of The Baltimore Sun stated that the storyline epitomized a "steamy romance", while The Wall Street Journal's Aaron Rutkoff called it "the funniest moment of the series." Goldman opined that their sexual encounter felt genuine; "He's a nice guy, she seems like a cool gal, and it felt genuine when she noted she felt plenty lonely too and ready for some companionship." Nick Venable of Cinema Blend asserted that the interactions between Maggie and Glenn was the highlight of the episode. "I'm glad the writers are introducing this comic book plot point, as this show seriously needs a couple without closets full of skeletons. When Glenn accidentally grabs a box of condoms for Maggie to see, I chuckled heartily. The ensuing conversation also made me smile, which makes me wonder why humor is paid the least amount of attention on the show." Jackson was surprised with the scene, and called it "unexpected". Jen Chenay of The Washington Post compared Glenn to Little Mikey from the Life advertisements, and summated: "He has assumed this role without much choice in the matter, but he has done so with a certain quiet, occasionally petrified, baseball-cap-wearing dignity that makes him admirable."

The water well sequence was critically acclaimed by critics. Darren Franich of Entertainment Weekly described the scene as "hilarious", and added, "I loved the horrific pointlessness of that entire plot, and it was yet more proof that makeup designer Greg Nicotero is the real star of [The Walking Dead]. I'm not sure anything else TV can come up with this season will match the image of the bloated half-zombie crawling across the ground with its water-logged intestine hanging out." Jackson, Rawlings, and the Houston Chronicle's Pamela Mitchell felt that the sequence was one of the series' most grotesque moments. Rawlings added: "Honestly, that right there is why many people watch The Walking Dead." Wigler expressed that it was "very well done", and noted that the walker was the "most vile, disgusting zombie that Greg Nicotero has ever created."

The concluding sequence of "Cherokee Rose" was also well received by television critics. Morgan Jeffrey of Digital Spy admired the scene, and described it as "tense". Halden opined that the scene was a reasonably solid storyline, and felt that it was the episode's biggest foreshadowing event.
