= Save the Last One =

- The Walking Dead episode
- Shane fends off numerous walkers at the high school.
- Episode no.: Season 2 Episode 3
- Directed by: Phil Abraham
- Written by: Scott M. Gimple
- Cinematography by: David Boyd
- Editing by: Hunter M. Via
- Original air date: October 30, 2011

Guest appearances
- IronE Singleton as Theodore "T-Dog" Douglas; Lauren Cohan as Maggie Greene; Pruitt Taylor Vince as Otis; Scott Wilson as Hershel Greene; Jane McNeill as Patricia

Episode chronology
← Previous "Bloodletting"	Next → "Cherokee Rose"
- The Walking Dead season 2

"Save the Last One" is the third episode of the second season of the post-apocalyptic horror television series The Walking Dead, and the 9th episode overall of the series. It first aired on AMC in the United States on October 30, 2011. The episode was written by Scott M. Gimple and directed by Phil Abraham. In the episode, Shane Walsh (Jon Bernthal) and Otis (Pruitt Taylor Vince) desperately attempt to flee the walker-infested high school in order to deliver supplies to a dying Carl Grimes (Chandler Riggs). Meanwhile, Daryl Dixon (Norman Reedus) and Andrea (Laurie Holden) continue to search for Sophia Peletier (Madison Lintz).

Production for the episode occurred in July 2011 at Newnan High School in Newnan, Georgia, after receiving approval from the city council and the Coweta County School System. "Save the Last One" was critically acclaimed by television critics, who praised the storyline and the episode's conclusion. Upon its initial airing, it was watched by 6.095 million viewers and garnered a 3.1 rating in the 18-49 demographic, according to Nielsen ratings.

== Plot ==
With Shane Walsh and Otis missing for hours, Hershel Greene informs Rick Grimes and his wife Lori that he must perform the surgery on their son Carl without the necessary equipment.

Andrea and Daryl Dixon go out in search of Sophia Peletier, following her mother Carol weeping for her loss. Daryl tells Andrea about his childhood, and expresses hope that they will successfully locate Sophia. They stumble upon an abandoned campsite, where a person had committed suicide by hanging themselves from a tree and now has become an undead walker. Daryl insists that they leave the walker alone, but Andrea firmly refuses. He asks her if she wants to continue living, to which she replies with uncertainty. Daryl euthanizes the walker as they leave. Upon returning to the camp, Dale Horvath attempts to reconcile with Andrea by returning her handgun.

Glenn and T-Dog journey to the Greene home. There, Glenn begins to pray for the well-being of his fellow survivors, while T-Dog receives medical treatment for blood poisoning. Meanwhile Carl goes in and out of consciousness, and briefly recalls his encounter with the deer before going into a seizure. A distraught Lori opines to Rick about ending Carl's suffering, but Rick insists on keeping him alive.

At the high school, Shane and Otis split up after struggling against a horde of walkers. Both injure their legs while escaping, slowing their progress down. Shane and Otis seemingly are out of options for survival. They begin to limp back to their truck, eventually running low on ammo.

Rick and Lori decide to do the operation without the necessary equipment. As they prepare for the operation, Shane arrives with the medical supplies, but without Otis. He claims that Otis sacrificed himself in order to save Carl. The episode flashes back to show Shane sacrificed Otis by shooting him in the leg and leaving him as bait for the walkers while he escaped with the medicine. The episode ends in the present, with Shane shaving his head, wiping out evidence of a bald spot of torn hair caused by Otis during their brief scuffle.

== Production ==
Similar to its preceding episode, "Bloodletting", principal photography for "Save the Last One" commenced in Newnan, Georgia at Newnan High School in July 2011, after receiving approval from the city council and the Coweta County School System. Site preparation initiated on July 1, and filming began at the gymnasium of the school over a period of four days from July 7–8 and again from July 11–12. The location was temporarily renovated to mirror an abandoned Federal Emergency Management Agency camp. Michael Riley, the production manager for the episode, contacted the Newnan Police Department to collaborate with producers. Because of the large size of the filming location, Riley's production company notified surrounding neighborhoods to ease inconvenience.

"Save the Last One" marked the final appearance of Pruitt Taylor Vince, whose character was killed off in the episode after Shane shoots him; this subsequently marks a turning point for him as a false protagonist. In an interview with Entertainment Weekly, writer Robert Kirkman explained the reaction of Jon Bernthal to the particular scene:

"Jon Bernthal is a tremendous talent and he’s got a lot of professionalism. A lot of the actors came in to the room as we were starting this season and Bernthal was one of those actors. He was aware of a lot of the things that were coming up and we talked to him about his character and what we had planned for him this season and he was on board with a lot of it. It was nice being able to run through scenarios with him and get his opinion on how he perceived his character. Because actors, a lot of times, think about their characters more than the writers because they’re focused on that single character for months of their lives, if not years. He was all prepared for this."

Kirkman expressed that the death of Otis was a "somewhat justifiable homicide", and retorted that "Otis was slowing him down, and Carl's life hangs in the balance." He continued: "It's [The Walking Dead] and we're existing in that gray area and we're really pushing the boundaries of that. But at the end of the day, Shane shot that guy and left him for dead and ran off. It's a pretty dark moment and it informs Shane's character and sets up a lot of things that are going to be happening moving forward."

== Reception ==
=== Ratings ===
"Save the Last One" was originally broadcast on October 30, 2011 in the United States on AMC. It was viewed by 6.095 million viewers, and attained a 3.1 rating in the 18-49 demographic, according to Nielsen ratings. The episode was the highest-rated program of the day, garnering considerably higher ratings than a stock car racing event as part of the 2011 NASCAR Sprint Cup Series on ESPN and The Next Iron Chef on Food Network. Similarly, the episode became the second highest-rated cable program of the week dated October 30, attaining significantly higher ratings that WWE Raw but scoring considerably lower than a game between the Baltimore Ravens and the Jacksonville Jaguars as part of the 2011 NFL season. Total viewership and ratings for "Save the Last One" moderately declined from the previous episode, "Bloodletting", which was viewed by 6.70 million viewers and received a 3.6 rating in the 18-49 demographic.

=== Critical response ===
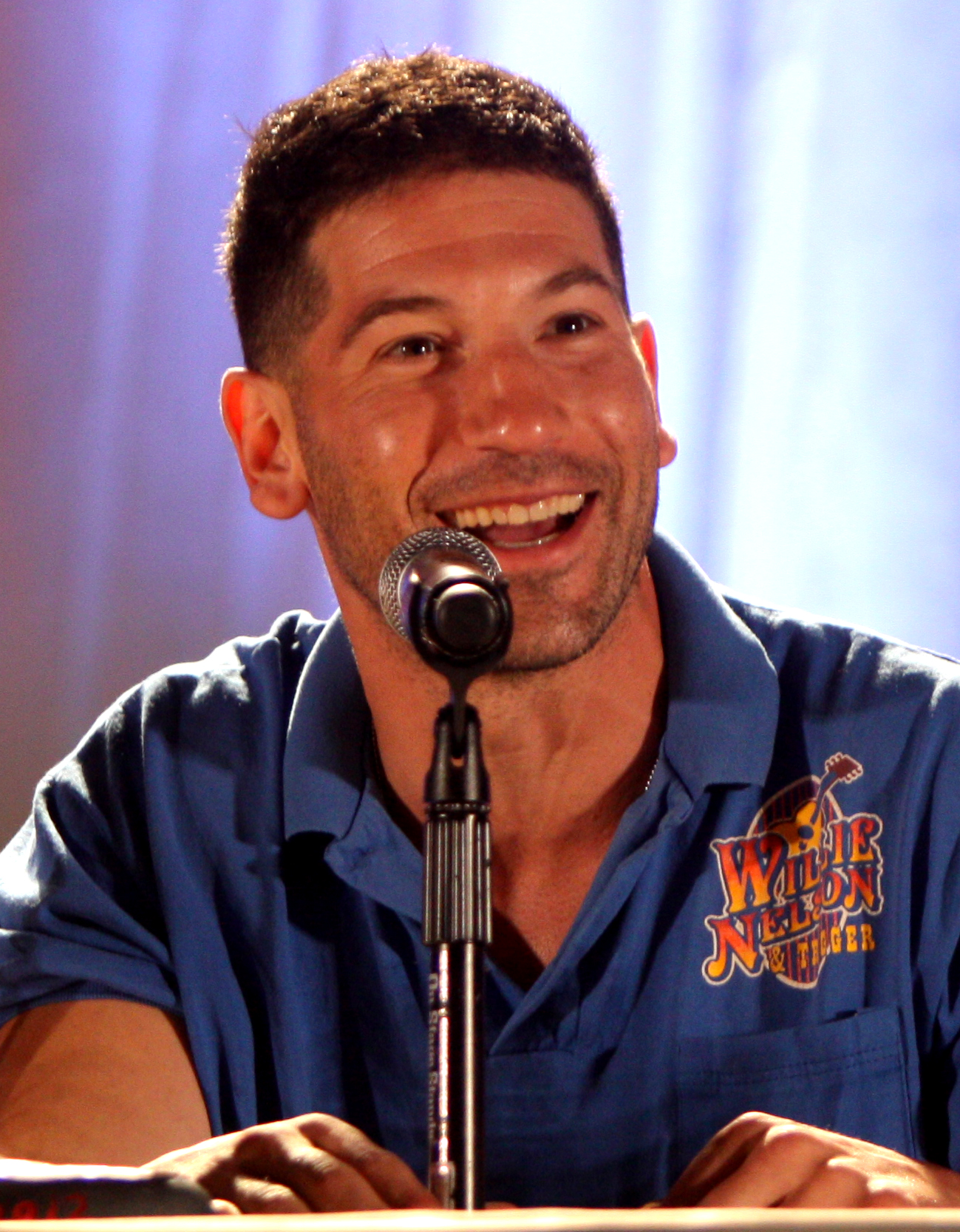
Critics appreciated the character development of Shane (Jon Bernthal, pictured).

"Save the Last One" was critically acclaimed by television critics. IGN's Eric Goldman praised the episode, giving it a nine out of ten, signifying an "amazing" rating. He opined that it was his favorite episode since the series' pilot episode, "Days Gone Bye", and added that "it had scary zombie scenes, good action, interesting character interaction and a revelation at the end that gave us a whole lot to process." John Serba of The Grand Rapids Press was split on "Save the Last One"; while asserting that it was "imminently watchable", he felt that the episode was unbalanced as a whole and criticized the dialogue. Serba wrote: "The show continues to display a disproportionate amount of dialogue compared to the development of its characters. It needs to do a better job of biding its time between crowd-pleasing zombie attacks." HitFix's Alan Sepinwall echoed similar thoughts, opining, "the characters need more depth. The show seems to be setting itself out to be a slow-burning character study in the context of a zombie apocalypse — and with enough chase scenes and other scares to entice folks who just want brain-eating action — and the characters need to be more complex than they've been shown to be so far."

The Baltimore Sun journalist Andrew Conrad commended the episode, citing that the episodic pace was faster than the preceding episode. Josh Wigler of MTV opined: "Tonight's episode was all about pairs. Shane and Otis, two soldiers in a foxhole. Rick and Lori, two parents at odds over how to handle their son's failing condition. Glenn and Maggie, two strangers desperate to make a connection. Andrea and Daryl, two opposites trying to find a reason to move on. Great scenes with all of these duos, and it really goes to show just how fantastic The Walking Dead cast is, both in the loud and quiet moments." Zack Handlen from The A.V. Club awarded the episode a 'B+' grade, and felt that the episode was superior to the previous episode. In contrast, Aaron Rutkoff of The Wall Street Journal was less enthusiastic about the episode, expressing, "truth be told, after three episodes very little has happened so far this season." TV Fanatic's Sean McKenna asserted that despite not having any direction, "Save the Last One" managed to retain the "tension and action that makes this show a thrill ride every week." He added: "I'm sure for some the slow pace in real time is something of a bother, but for me it adds to the intensity of the characters' situation and the show itself." McKenna ultimately gave the episode a 4.5 out of 5 stars. Similarly, Morgan Jeffrey of Digital Spy stated that the episode was the strongest installment of the season as well as amongst the series' best installments.

Critics praised the character development of Shane in the episode, as well as the execution of Otis. Nate Rawlings of Time felt that it was a dark moment for the series, and felt that it added anticipation to future development. He wrote: "At some point, Shane will have to come clean with Rick about what happened to Otis. Given Rick’s extremely rigid morale [sic] code and Shane’s now demonstrated willingness to do whatever it takes to survive, the showdown promises to be bigger than just a battle of two alpha males. The Rick/Shane divide is a battle of two leaders with different ideas of humanity and survival." Mark Maurer of The Star-Ledger opined that "the multi-layered opening [...] illustrates how Shane’s impulsive nature makes him a valuable if ruthless warrior." Handlen appreciated the character development of Shane, writing, "Shane has long been the dark horse of the group, the one most likely to go off the morality reservation, and this reveal works well to bring him that much closer to darkness. It's not the subtlest moment [...] but, given how friendly and cool Otis was, and given how well the two seemed to be working together, it's a strong twist." He added that because of the death of Otis, the show now has a sense of direction. "His decision to sacrifice Otis is easy enough to rationalize; somebody had to get back for Carl's sake, Shane was faster, and both of them probably weren't going to make it. That's the beauty of it. In a certain light, he made the right choice." Morgan Jeffrey wrote: "This week's installment delivered even more scares than usual — Shane's escape from the high school was almost unbearably tense."
