= Lori Grimes =

- The Walking Dead character
- Lori Grimes, as she appears in the comic book series (left) and as portrayed by Sarah Wayne Callies in the television series (right).
- First appearance: Comic: "Issue #2" (2003); Rick Grimes 2000: "Issue #75" (2010); Television: "Days Gone Bye" (2010); Literature: "The Fall of the Governor - Part Two" (2014)
- Last appearance: Comic: "Issue #55" (2008); Rick Grimes 2000: Skybound X (2021); Television: "What Comes After" (2018); Literature: "The Fall of the Governor - Part Two" (2014)
- Created by: Robert Kirkman; Tony Moore
- Adapted by: Frank Darabont (The Walking Dead)
- Portrayed by: Sarah Wayne Callies

In-universe information
- Occupation: Housewife; Comic: Art College Student
- Family: Comic: Jeffrey Grimes (brother-in-law); Andrea Grimes II (granddaughter)
- Spouse: Rick Grimes
- Significant other: Shane Walsh (affair)
- Children: Carl Grimes (son); Judith Grimes (daughter) Comic: Sophia (daughter-in-law)

Lori Grimes is a fictional character from the comic book series The Walking Dead and was portrayed by Sarah Wayne Callies in the American television series of the same name. Created by writer Robert Kirkman and artist Tony Moore, the character made her debut in The Walking Dead #2 in 2003. In both forms of media, she is married to Rick Grimes. They have two children Carl and Judith. The character escapes the zombie apocalypse with Carl, and Rick's partner Shane Walsh. Believing her husband to be dead, she starts a relationship with Shane, but breaks it off when she finds her husband is alive.

For her performance as Lori, Callies was nominated for the Saturn Award for Best Actress on Television in 2010, and was among the cast members of The Walking Dead winning the Satellite Award for Best Cast - Television Series in 2012.

== Appearances ==
=== Comic book series ===
Lori, as depicted in the comic book series.

Lori Grimes is an average middle-class housewife living in Cynthiana, Kentucky. As the outbreak begins, her son, Carl, and she are evacuated out of the city with help from her husband Rick's best friend and work partner, Shane Walsh, in hopes of getting to where her parents live. During the evacuation, the guilt with which she has been racked over abandoning Rick leads her to have a sexual relationship with Shane, which she deeply regrets afterward. She continually brushes off Shane's attempts at advancing and ignores him even more when Rick miraculously arrives at their campsite.

Lori soon finds out, after counting her missed periods, that she is pregnant; however, she hesitates to tell anybody until after Shane's death and their move back onto the road.

Lori faces typical pregnancy issues such as morning sickness and mood swings throughout the first few months of her term. Lori and everyone else find relative stability at an abandoned prison, with hot showers, supplies, and security. While at the prison, she also begins to deepen her bond with fellow survivor Carol Peletier. Lori is frequently concerned with the well-being of both her family and the rest of the group. After giving birth to an infant girl that Rick and she name Judith, she remains extremely protective over her.

During the final stages of the prison assault led by the Governor, Lilly Caul by orders of the Governor, shoots Lori in the back with a shotgun, and she falls while holding Judith, crushing her.

Lori's death leaves Rick and Carl emotional wrecks. Rick suffers frightening hallucinations, both visual and auditory, at one point even using a phone to have what he believes are actual conversations with his deceased wife. He confides in Michonne, who has also talked to a deceased loved one to help the coping process. Carl frequently blames Rick for Lori and Judith's deaths.

=== Television series ===
==== Season 1 ====
Lori's husband, Rick, is wounded in the line of duty and left in a coma during the outbreak. Lori, believing him to be dead, takes Carl and accompanies Rick's best friend Shane as they head to Atlanta. They befriend Carol and her family while on the road, and later both groups settle with other survivors on the outskirts of Atlanta near an abandoned quarry. Lori, convinced of Rick's death by witnessing the military bomb Atlanta, eventually succumbs to her distraught state and embarks on a sexual relationship with Shane.

Rick eventually wakes from his coma, and makes his way to Atlanta, and is rescued there by members of the quarry group. When Rick is brought back to the camp, Lori and he have a tearful reunion, but Lori comes to feel guilty with her affair with Shane, and abruptly ends it, as well as discouraging Carl from hanging around Shane. The group eventually abandons the quarry to head for the CDC in Atlanta, where its one remaining scientist, Dr. Jenner, allows them in, and they enjoy the relative luxury of the facilities. During the night, a drunken Shane attempts to sexually assault Lori, but she fights him off. The group is forced to evacuate the CDC and continue on.

==== Season 2 ====
Rick's group is stalled by a traffic jam of cars on a highway; the RV breaks down and the group searches the traffic jam for parts and supplies. Shane tells Lori that he plans to leave the group, and they get into an argument. A walker herd passes through the area and Carol's daughter Sophia is discovered by two stragglers who chase her into the woods; in the process of killing her pursuers, Rick loses sight of her. He, Carl, and others go searching for her, and eventually split into two groups with Rick, Shane, and Carl in one and Lori, Andrea, Carol, and Daryl in the other. Lori's group is headed back to the highway when they are met by Maggie Greene from a nearby farmstead, asking for Lori, as Carl had accidentally been shot, and is being cared for by her father, Hershel. While Hershel is able to stabilize Carl temporarily, Carl is suffering from internal bleeding and Hershel lacks the equipment to perform surgery to repair the leaking blood vessel. Shane goes with Hershel's farmhand, Otis, to get supplies from a nearby school infested with walkers. Shane shoots Otis deliberately to give himself time to escape, but does not tell this to the others when he returns with the supplies. This leaves him with an emotional scar, and he shaves his head, partially to hide the clump of hair Otis had torn out from it; these actions trouble Lori.

Lori feels some illness as Carl recovers, and discreetly asks Glenn to find a pregnancy test on his next supply run. The test turns up positive, and Lori panics at the prospect of raising a baby in their present circumstances. Again she confides in Glenn, and asks him to get her some "morning after" pills on his next run. Once she has them, she tries to take them, but has last-second thoughts and induces vomiting to bring them back up. Rick discovers the box for the pills and confronts her about it. She admits to being pregnant, and having had an affair with Shane when she had no idea Rick was alive, and fears how they can raise a child in this world. Rick helps her come to terms with the situation, and she decides she will keep the child and they will raise it as their own, regardless of who the father is. News of Lori's pregnancy comes out to the rest of the group, and creates a rift between Shane and Rick over who fathered the child that creates tension throughout the group.

After the shootout at the barn, Rick and Glenn go off to look for Hershel, but do not return after a while. Beth collapses from grief at the loss of her mother and Lori, realizing Beth needs Hershel, leaves the farm in the same direction Rick and Glenn went but gets into an accident. Shane comes and rescues her, falsely claiming Rick had returned to convince Lori to return to the farm. Once back at the farm, Lori talks to Dale, learning that he feels Shane is progressively becoming paranoid and he believes that Shane likely killed Otis at the school. Later, Lori helps Maggie stop Maggie's sister Beth from committing suicide. When Dale is attacked by a walker and the group is forced to euthanize him, Lori apologizes to Shane for how she had been treating him.

Events at the farm lead to a confrontation between Rick and Shane, and Rick eventually stabs Shane to death after Shane promises to kill Rick and take his place in the family. In the aftermath, a horde of walkers, drawn by the gunfire, swarm the farmstead, and Rick's group is forced to abandon it. As they regroup on the highway, Lori learns of the circumstances around Shane's death, and is horrified to learn that Carl put him down after Shane reanimated.

==== Season 3 ====
Over the next several months, Lori finds that both Rick and Carl have grown distant from her. Lori is near the end of her pregnancy, and as the group finds an abandoned prison, they decide to clear it out for their own use. They deal with roaming walkers and five living prisoners, two of whom quickly fall into line with the group, but the others they are forced to kill, while Rick leaves the fifth, Andrew, outside in a pack of walkers, though unknown to them, Andrew manages to escape. Lori fears that she may need a repeat Caesarian section as she already had one with Carl, and Carol practices the surgical technique on dispatched walkers. Sometime later, Andrew lures a group of walkers back to the prison to get his revenge. The group is forced to scatter as the walkers flood; the fright causes Lori to enter into labor, and Carl, Maggie, and she take shelter in a boiler room. Lori's fears are affirmed about the birth, and she instructs Maggie to perform an improvised Cesarean section on her, knowing that without painkillers or anesthetic, this will likely be fatal for her. She says her goodbyes to Carl before Maggie starts. Lori's daughter is recovered alive, but as she expected, Lori succumbs to the procedure. Carl insists on being the one to put down Lori before she can reanimate. Maggie and Carl take the baby outside once the walkers have been cleared, and Rick, on seeing the child but not Lori, breaks down. He races to the boiler room, and sees a bloated walker that he believes ate Lori's body, and stabs it over and over. Rick starts having hallucinations of Lori and other survivors who had previously died, leaving him struggling to keep leadership of the group.

As the group deals with attacks from the Governor from the nearby Woodbury community, Rick struggles with continuous visions of Lori, which make him doubt his abilities as a leader. However, he eventually makes a stand against the Governor, reunited his group, and finds that he no longer sees visions of Lori. He accepts her daughter, which Carl named Judith, as his own, despite believing that she may have been fathered by Shane.

== Development ==
=== Casting ===
Lori Grimes is portrayed by Sarah Wayne Callies, who was cast in the series in April 2010. Callies saw an issue of the comic-book series while at a bookstore in Vancouver. "I was looking through for the latest issue that had just come out and the owner of the comic book store came up to me and said, 'I see you're checking out The Walking Dead," she stated. "It's amazing.' I said, 'Yeah, I'm a huge fan.' And he said, 'You know they're making a television show for AMC. It's supposed to be really good.' I kind of looked at him and I froze. I just went, 'I'll keep an eye out for it.' And I ran out of the store."

In the comics, Kirkman resolved the love triangle between Lori, Shane, and Rick very quickly, but in the TV show, he decided to spend more time exploring this relationship.

Callies was in favor of Lori dying while in the prison, just like the comic character. In an interview, she stated, "I argued that it was necessary to kill Lori and I feel very strongly that for all of the other deviations we may have from the comic book, killing Lori does something to Rick that is vital for the story and can't be done any other way."

== Reception ==
=== Critical reception ===
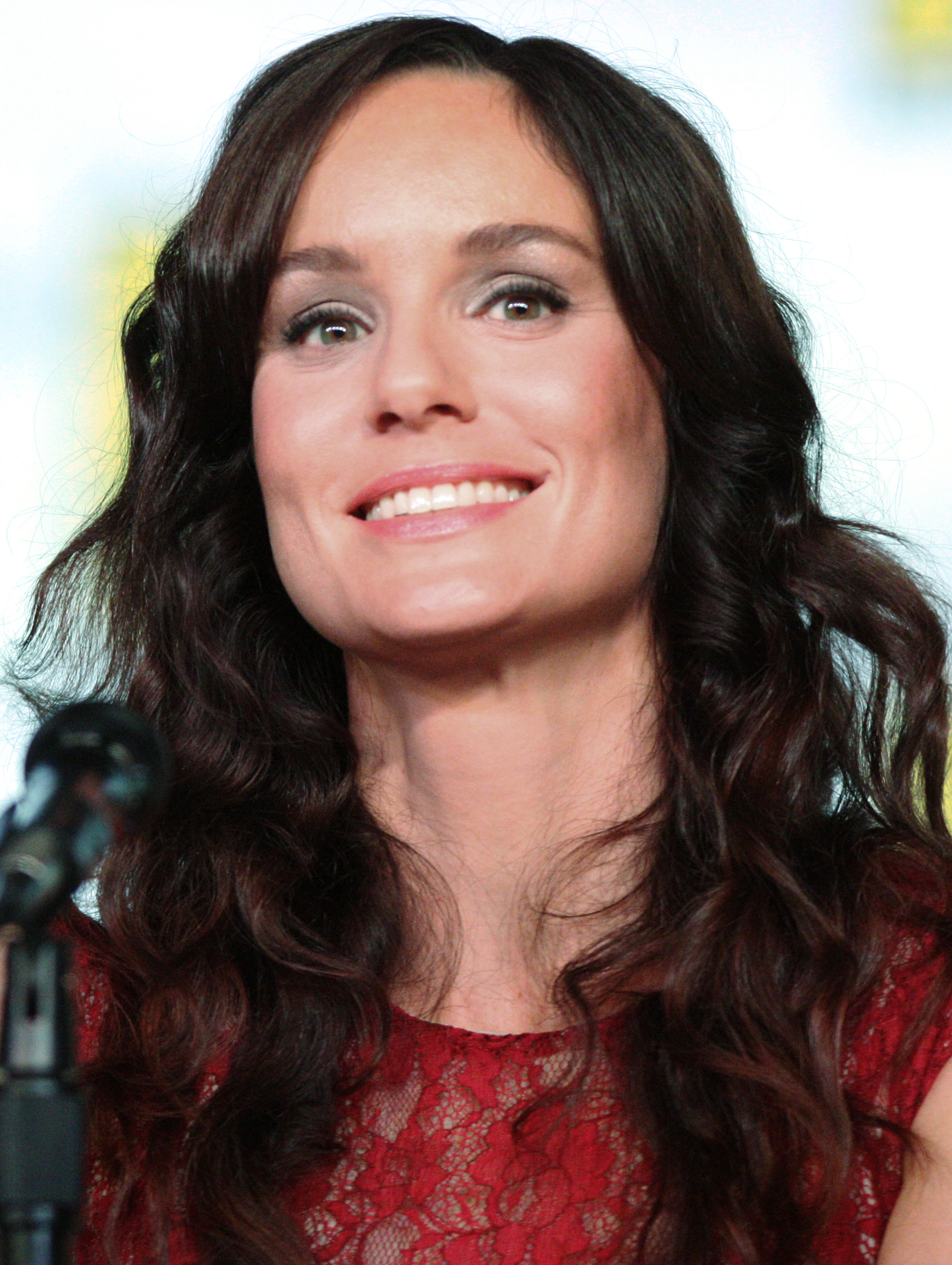
Sarah Wayne Callies' performance received mixed reviews while the character of Lori received generally negative reviews.

Regarding the television adaptation of the character, Lori received generally negative reviews, with Sarah Wayne Callies' performance receiving a mixed response from critics. Critics were polarized with the characters' reaction to Lori opting for an abortion in the episode "Secrets". Writing for The A.V. Club, Zack Handlen criticized the character's opposing views on the matter, and stated that their reasoning was invalid. Handlen wrote. "I'm not even sure it would be possible for her to abort the pregnancy at this point, but the show's working on the assumption that having a child in a world where death literally lurks around every corner is an unequivocal good. The only person who's been anti-pregnancy is Lori, and the show hasn't managed to cast her in a very good light, so it's not like her arguments hold much water—which is also ridiculous, because ultimately, her opinion is the only one that matters." HitFix writer Alan Sepinwall reflected similar thoughts, and stated that Rick's arguments against Lori's attempts were obsolete.

The love triangle involving Lori, Rick, and Shane, however, was commended. Meslow felt that the interactions between Lori and Rick possessed "as much rawness and honesty as could be hoped for."

Commentators criticized the character development of Lori Grimes in the episode "Nebraska". Eric Goldman for IGN was angry upon viewing the crash sequence, avowing that it stunted any development intended for the scene. He stated, "The Walking Dead really needs to work on strengthening its female characters, and it doesn't help when Lori has a major accident for such a stupid reason, getting distracted as she looked at a map while she drove. Yeah, yeah, there was a zombie in the road, but it could have been an animal [...] just as easily, and it really undercut the intended drama of her situation when it just seems so stupid that it happened at all." Zack Handlen for The A.V. Club thought that the foundation set up for furthering the storyline progression was contrived, while Aaron Rutkoff of The Wall Street Journal said that the premise of the dilemma made no sense.

Critics were divided upon the interaction between Rick and Lori after she discovers Shane had died. Commentators were critical of the performance of Sarah Wayne Callies. Although The Huffington Post's Maureen Ryan reacted positively to Lincoln's performance, she affirmed that the contradictory nature of Lori almost ruined the scene. Similarly, New York's Starlee Kine criticized Callies' facial expressions during the sequence. Josh Jackson, who writes for Paste wrote, "If that was a challenge from the writers, though, Sarah Wayne Callies has to feel like they're just messing with her at this point. Her character, Lori, basically tells Rick that Shane needs to be put down, and then treats him like a monster when he's forced to follow through with it."

The fates of Lori and the character of T-Dog in the episode "Killer Within" garnered favorable reviews from television commentators. According to HitFix writer Alan Sepinwall, the moment when Lori and Carl share their goodbyes was the most heartbreaking event since the ending of the second-season episode "Pretty Much Dead Already". Los Angeles Times columnist Laura Hudson felt it was a grim departure for a character who endured long bouts of grief for reasons beyond her control. Erik Kain from Forbes found Lori's death especially difficult to watch, and was shocked by T-Dog's "sudden" death despite the fact that he "was never as prominent a figure" on the program. "As hard as these deaths were to watch," Kain wrote, "they also give me faith in the show." Though he stated that T-Dog died "a hero's death", Michael Rapoport of the Wall Street Journal concluded that Lori's "gut-churning" demise was the more memorable.

Lori's demise was featured in The Huffington Post's list of "The Biggest 'OMG' TV Moments of 2012", and placed 19th in Slate's article covering the year's most noteworthy television moments. Journalist Chris Kirk said that the segment was "utterly surprising", and pointed out that the writers beguiled viewers by shedding light onto Lori's crumbled relationship with Rick. In contrast, Zack Handlen of The A.V. Club in his review felt the episode "stumble[d]" in how [...] Lori [was] eliminated and in how the Woodbury storyline repeated what was already known. Handlen commented in his B+ review that "killing [...] Lori earned the show an immediate thrill, but it also meant crossing off [a] potential source[...] of drama, [someone] who had a history on the series, however thin or poorly developed that history might have been."

Sarah Wayne Callies' performance in the episode was unanimously praised, however. IGN writer Eric Goldman commended Callies. Sepinwall added that Callies "absolutely sold" the portrayal of a mother saying "goodbye to the son who had to grow up much too quickly".
