= Shane Walsh (The Walking Dead) =

Fictional character in The Walking Dead franchise

Shane
- The Walking Dead character
- Shane Walsh, as portrayed by Jon Bernthal in the television series (left) and in the comic book series (right).
- First appearance: Comic: "Issue #1" (2003); Television: "Days Gone Bye" (2010)
- Last appearance: Comic: "Issue #37" (2007); Television: "What Comes After" (2018)
- Created by: Robert Kirkman; Tony Moore
- Adapted by: Frank Darabont (The Walking Dead)
- Portrayed by: Jon Bernthal

In-universe information
- Occupation: Leader of the Atlanta Camp; Comic: Cynthiana Sheriff's Deputy; Television: King County Sheriff's Deputy; Head of Gun Training
- Family: Television: Jean (grandmother)
- Significant other: Lori Grimes (affair)
- Children: Judith Grimes (probable biological daughter)

Shane (full name in the television series: Shane Walsh) is a fictional character from the comic book series The Walking Dead and was portrayed by Jon Bernthal in the American television series of the same name.

In the comic series, Shane is portrayed as a Cynthiana Sheriff's Deputy, as well as the longtime friend and fellow police officer of series protagonist Rick Grimes. After Rick is shot and put into a coma, and the zombie outbreak occurs, he rescues Rick's family and leads a group of survivors, becoming romantically involved with Rick's wife, Lori. When Rick returns to his family alive, Shane grows increasingly jealous of their relationship, as well as Rick's role in the group.

In the television series' first season, Shane leads the survivors until Rick's arrival, then becomes Rick's right-hand man. The reunion is not completely amicable; in the second season, Shane develops into an antagonistic character, becoming more aggressive and unpredictable, due to his growing obsession with Lori and subsequent jealousy of Rick. He also becomes willing to abandon or kill those he deems liabilities to the group and has no moral conscience for outsiders. This puts Shane at odds with Rick's moral leadership, as he believes that Rick is ill-equipped to lead and that he would be a better leader. Lori and Carl become his only true concern, as opposed to the group itself.

== Appearances ==
=== Comic book series ===
Shane, as depicted in the comic book series.

Shane was a police officer in Cynthiana, Kentucky, and best friend of the town's deputy sheriff, Rick Grimes. After Rick is shot and put into a coma, and after the dead begin to rise, Shane accompanies Rick's wife, Lori Grimes, and Rick's son, Carl, to a purported safe zone in Atlanta, Georgia. They later form a group of survivors living on the outskirts of the city, with Shane repeatedly telling them that the government will one day return to save them. During this time, Shane and an emotionally destitute Lori share a night of sex, something that Shane had wanted for a long time.

Shane is first overjoyed when Rick joins the group, but gradually becomes jealous of Rick and Lori getting back together. Eventually, Lori brushes off Shane's advances and says that their brief romance must stop. Sent into an emotional meltdown by Lori siding with Rick, Shane leaves in a rage. Rick follows and Shane attempts to murder him, stating that he has nothing left to live for other than Lori. Carl happens upon the scene and shoots Shane through the neck, mortally wounding him. Rick later returns to the grave site and finds out that Shane has reanimated; he shoots him in the head to finally put him to rest, but does not rebury him. Shane's reanimation confirms that it is not necessary for someone to be bitten to turn, something that was previously witnessed at the prison. Shane coming back also confirms that this is not an isolated effect.

=== Television series ===
==== Season 1 ====
Prior to the zombie apocalypse, Shane is Rick Grimes's partner in the King County Sheriff's department. Rick is knocked into a coma after trying to capture escaped convicts, and Shane quickly gets him to a hospital.

During the initial onset of the apocalypse, as military forces indiscriminately kill anyone alive at the hospital, Shane tries to revive Rick, but he remains in a coma, and instead Shane secures his hospital room door to keep him hidden from the military. He then helps Rick's wife Lori and son Carl evacuate towards Atlanta. They join the group that camp in a quarry near Atlanta when they find that Atlanta has been overrun. During their time at camp, Lori presumes Rick is dead, and starts a romantic relationship with Shane. Shane is mentioned to have told Lori that Rick is dead and appears to have genuinely believed that. Shane securing Rick's door despite this belief appears to be the thing that kept him alive and protected from both the zombies and the soldiers who were killing everyone in the hospital.

Rick eventually wakes from the coma and makes his way towards Atlanta, and ends up meeting a scavenging group from the camp in the city. They bring him back to camp, both to Lori and Carl's elation and to concern to Shane. Lori ends her affair with Shane and warns Carl from being around Shane, fearing that Rick would take her brief affair with Shane poorly. Further, with Rick's presence, Shane's role in the group's leadership wanes, causing him to lose his temper and self-control. When Rick decides that they should head towards the CDC's Atlanta compound, Shane tries to ask Lori to convince Rick to change his mind, but Lori backs her husband. Dale sees Shane contemplating shooting Rick, and keeps his eye on him. The group meets Dr. Jenner, the last remaining researcher at the CDC, who allows them to stay. During the night, Shane gets drunk and attempts to rape Lori, but she fights back. The group learns that the CDC is running on emergency power, and will be destroyed when the fuel runs out as a means to destroy the infectious samples, and they are forced to flee just before that happens. Rick decides to lead the survivors towards Fort Benning.

==== Season 2 ====
The group is stopped on the road by a massive car pileup on the highway, and further waylaid when a walker horde passes, which ends up with Sophia Peletier running off on her own for safety. The group starts searching for her, and Shane quietly tells Lori he plans to leave the group soon. Rick, Carl, and Shane look for Sophia when Carl is accidentally shot by Otis, a farmhand from Hershel's farm, and they rush him back to the farm, where Hershel attempts to operate and remove the bullet. However, due to the severity of the wound, Hershel knows he will need more medicine, and Shane offers to go with Otis to recover this from a FEMA trailer located at a nearby school. At the school, the two recover the supplies, but both end up hurting their legs. While trying to limp to safety from a walker horde, Shane shoots Otis in the leg, using him as bait for the walkers so that he can get away. Back at the farm, Shane brings the necessary medicine and claims Otis didn't make it. The others seem to accept Shane's tale, but Shane proceeds to shave his head mostly to hide a patch of hair that Otis had ripped out after being shot. Dale and Daryl later confide that they both suspect Shane of playing a larger role in Otis' death and suspect that Rick is aware as well.

Shane's behavior becomes more and more erratic following this incident, and he has further conflicts with Rick when he insists looking for Sophia is a waste of time. Shane learns that Lori is pregnant with his child but Lori and Rick insist they will raise it as their own. When they learn that Hershel's barn is full of walkers of his family and friends, Shane insists they kill the walkers to protect themselves, and then goes to open the barn doors himself, allowing the walkers loose against Rick's and Hershel's pleas. The group kills the walkers, including the reanimated body of Sophia, although Shane is shown to be equally devastated by her death. After this, Hershel goes missing and Rick sets out to search for him. Lori becomes concerned when Rick doesn't return soon, and drives off to find them but gets in an accident. Shane goes out to rescue Lori, giving him a chance to apologize to her, but she remains distant from him, especially after learning that Shane had lied to her in order to get Lori to go back to the farm. Rick returns with Hershel and another survivor, Randall, who was from another group that was scavenging for supplies and attacked Rick. Randall was injured during the attack, and they brought him back to be healed, but Rick says that once he is well enough, they will drive him far away from the farm. Rick and Shane go together to deposit him at a distant site where Rick finally confronts Shane about Otis' murder which Shane admits to. Randall reveals that he knows Maggie, Hershel's daughter. Shane believes that Randall knows the location of Hershel's farm from this and tries to kill Randall, but Rick intervenes, leading to a loud conflict that draws a walker horde. The three escape, and lock Randall back up on the farm while the group struggles with what to do with him. Shane still insists that they kill him, but the others, particularly Dale, remind them about losing their humanity in this decision.

When the group seems set on letting Randall live, Shane secretly takes Randall to the nearby woods, where he snaps Randall's neck and kills him. When Rick finds Randall missing, Shane arrives at the farm and tells the group Randall ambushed him and escaped. Shane, Rick, Daryl, and Glenn take into the forest in pursuit of Randall, who they thought had escaped. The search party splits into two groups. Shane and Rick search a random area, while Glenn and Daryl follow Randall's tracks. In the process, Daryl and Glenn find and put down the reanimated Randall who has turned despite only dying of a broken neck. Shane reveals to Rick that he killed Randall, after Rick concludes that Shane has lured him away from the group to kill him. Shane pulls a gun on Rick, demanding Rick to draw his weapon. Rick refuses to draw his weapon and hands his revolver to Shane, but then turns and stabs Shane with a knife in the heart, killing him. Rick sees Carl nearby, drawn in by their argument, and Carl suddenly holds a gun to Rick. He fires, but Rick sees that Carl was shooting at the reanimated body of Shane. The noise draws in a walker horde that forces Rick's group and Hershel's family to flee. When they regroup, Rick explains what happened to Shane, knowing that Shane was luring him into a trap, but they ask him how Shane and Randall reanimated despite not being bitten. Rick is forced to tell them the secret Dr. Jenner told him at the CDC: that every living human carries the virus that causes them to become walkers when they die. Rick hadn't told anyone because he didn't believe Jenner until he saw Shane reanimate without being bitten.

In later seasons, Rick accepts that Lori's child, named Judith, was fathered by Shane, but he and Carl love her as if she were their own.

==== Season 3 ====
When Rick's group attacks the community of Woodbury in Season 3, Rick, who has been struggling with coming to grips with reality after Lori dies in childbirth, thinks he sees Shane among the Woodbury soldiers attacking his friends. Rick kills him and approaches the body, only to find out that it was another Woodbury soldier.

==== Season 9 ====
Shane returns in a badly wounded Rick's hallucination as he struggles to lead a herd of walkers away from the construction camp, happy to see what Rick has become and tells him to continue fighting.

Shane's corpse appears alongside other past characters before finding Sasha Williams in his hallucination.

== Development and reception ==
Shane Walsh was created by Robert Kirkman and Tony Moore, the writer and original artist of The Walking Dead comic book series. The character first appeared in the first issue of the comic book series in October 2003, but was expanded upon greatly in the television show adapted from the comics in 2010. As a result, Shane lives much longer in the chronology of the story in the show than he does in the comics. Kirkman described the comic book version of Shane's character as a short and quick "wham, bam, thank you ma'am" arc compared to that of his counterpart in the television series. Kirkman said he preferred the show's version of Shane and that the differences between the two versions of the character illustrate the ability to explore and evolve elements from the comic book in different ways on the show.

Jon Bernthal portrayed Shane in the television series, marking the actor's most high-profile role to that date. Bernthal and Andrew Lincoln, who was eventually cast as protagonist Rick Grimes, auditioned for the show together and were the first to be chosen for the regular cast. Series creator Frank Darabont had all actors audition for the role of Rick, including Bernthal, and then brought back the actors under close consideration to audition for Shane and other roles. Bernthal, however, wanted to portray the part of Shane from early on and fought for the part, despite knowing that the character would die early in the series.

Robert Kirkman said Shane's death was planned for the TV series adaptation "before the first episode of season one was shot." "Frank Darabont had actually planned to do it at the end of the first season before he knew that the first season was going to be six episodes. Once the show was given a six-episode order it was decided that we would hold Shane’s death for the second season. But from the very first day of planning the second season it was mapped out that Shane would be kicking the bucket at the end of this season." Bernthal said he liked playing a role he knew would end early because it allowed him to craft a full story arc from beginning to end and "really show the colors" of the character.

Bernthal grew very close to Darabont and publicly voiced his disappointment when Darabont was forced out of the series. This led to speculation that Bernthal asked to be written out of the series due to Darabont's departure, but Bernthal stated that this was not the case. Kirkman said he loved Bernthal's performance as Shane and hated to see him leave the series, but felt it was necessary for the story. Likewise, Bernthal agreed with that direction for the character, and said he saw his role as "being a soldier for the story". Shane's death at the hands of Rick was the last scene Bernthal filmed for the show. The filming lasted all night until sunrise, and the entire cast attended out of respect for Bernthal, including Jeffrey DeMunn, who at that point had already left the series and flew in specifically to be there.

Bernthal did not realize until very late into filming that he would portray himself as a zombie, and said he had difficulty seeing due to the contact lenses he was fitted with. He tried to convince executive director Greg Nicotero, to allow him to say the word "Rick" as a zombie, which would mark the only time a zombie spoke in the show, but the request was denied. Upon departing from The Walking Dead, Bernthal was cast as Joe Teague in Mob City, a television drama series Darabont began developing for TNT about crime in Los Angeles in the 1940s and 50s. Bernthal later returned to film a brief cameo in the third season episode "Made to Suffer", in which Rick hallucinates that he sees Shane alive. Bernthal had just concluded filming his role in the Martin Scorsese film The Wolf of Wall Street when he returned for the scene. The Walking Dead successfully worked to keep Shane's reappearance secret until the episode aired. Shane's death was accidentally leaked by the AMC TV store on March 1, 2012, in promotional materials for the Season 2 Blu-ray set.

In reviewing Shane's death, The Atlantic wrote: "With Shane out of the picture in the comics, Otis doesn't die until a zombie attack that happens many issues later. And 94 issues into the series, Sophia is still going strong. (Viewed in this light, the TV series is a kind of Bizarro-World version of It's a Wonderful Life for Shane: How many lives were worse because he lived?)."

Glen Mazzara explained why Shane became a walker in "Better Angels" much faster than Amy, and why he still turned despite not getting bit: "We worked hard to make sure that revelation landed. We knew what we were doing there. We knew it would land a punch. We've never had a main character become a zombie to this extent. Those [rapid flashes of zombie mayhem] represent the storm in Shane's brain to some extent ... Amy was a weaker character. Shane is in a murderous rage ... he's going to reanimate quicker. There's just more life in that zombie, believe it or not. We do have internal rules for that."

At the 2012 Emerald City Comic-Con featuring a panel with Jon Bernthal and Laurie Holden, Bernthal revealed what his version of Shane's death would have been. The ending would have been the same up until the point when Shane and Rick walk into the clearing while searching for Randall. Rick would have asked why they are stopping in the field as they need to find their prisoner, to which Shane would have confessed that he had killed Randall which is a job Rick should have done himself. Shane then would have pulled his gun on Rick leading to similar dialogue between the two men as in the final episode, with the second change being that Shane would have admitted he was there to kill Rick. Rick would then have had similar dialogue as in the episode asking why he was doing this, as he thought they settled their issues in "18 Miles Out." Rick would have then thrown his gun away, instead of holding it in a non-confrontational position, insisting that Shane would have to kill an unarmed man. Shane would have then charged Rick and putting his gun into Ricks' face using the same insults as in the final episode about Carl and Lori, but adding a new insult such as "I tasted your wife." Rick would have then stabbed Shane to death as in the final episode, having the same dialogue as in the episode telling Shane it was his fault that he was being killed, not his own. Had Shane come back as a zombie, Rick (having thrown his gun away), would have picked up Shane's gun to shoot him. When attempting to pull the trigger Rick would come to the realization that Shane never put any ammo into his gun, and must've brought Rick out there to have him kill him, forcing Rick to finally be more like Shane. Carl would have then had shown up and killed zombified Shane, similarly again to the final episode.

Noel Murray of Rolling Stone ranked Shane Walsh 16th in a list of 30 best Walking Dead characters, saying, "Unhappy at being usurped, Shane (played by Daredevil's Punisher himself, Jon Bernthal) consistently undermined his friend at every turn, becoming the first ongoing TWD character to insist that the only way to make it in this new world is to leave all scruples and sentiment behind. And love him or hate him, his return as a walker remains one of the series' more memorable moments."

== Characterization ==
In the comics, Kirkman resolved the love triangle between Lori, Shane, and Rick very quickly, but in the TV show he decided to spend more time exploring this relationship. Bernthal said of the character in the first season, "I love the way that he feels about Rick [...] I love the friendship there. I love the way he uses this unbelievable dialogue that Frank [Darabont] wrote to be a good friend to Rick and to be by his side. Any time you can have a character that starts in one place and go somewhere completely different, that's the journey that we're mostly hungry for."

By the second season, Shane becomes the show's antagonist as his character grows darker and he finds himself at greater odds with Rick Grimes. He deteriorates throughout his run in the series, going from a confident leader who keeps the group of survivors under control to an increasingly desperate man whose actions become increasingly reactionary and morally ambiguous. However, Frank Darabont and the series producers did not seek to establish Shane as a villain because they wanted the characters to be authentic and complex rather than black-and-white.

I think what's so beautiful about Shane is he kind of adopts this new world order. He's realizing that there's actually no laws in this world. And he's kind of becoming this creature of the zombie apocalypse where he can shut down all emotions. But the tragedy of his character is he realizes that's an impossible task. He's probably the most emotional character on the show. So he's tricking himself. It's just such a great role to play.

— Jon Bernthal

Robert Kirkman and Jon Bernthal have rejected the classification of Shane as a "bad guy" as too simplistic, noting most of his actions stem from good intentions even when they seem dangerous or irrational. They argue that Shane is primarily driven by his desire to protect the other survivors, particularly Lori, Carl and Lori's unborn child. Shane believes he has the most pragmatic view of the post-zombie world, and thus is best qualified to both lead and protect the survivors. Bernthal feels that the character becomes more and more antagonistic as he starts to lose control of the group and, in his mind, losing his ability to protect them. Shane becomes combative with Rick out of frustration upon ceasing to be the group's de facto leader. But Bernthal also feels it stems from Shane's genuine belief that Rick is too virtuous and not pragmatic enough to lead the group, and thus is a hindrance to their safety. This difference in philosophy between the two characters is illustrated in the episode "18 Miles Out", when Shane tells Rick, "You can't just be the good guy and expect to live. Not anymore."

Bernthal argued that Shane better recognized the reality of the world after the zombie outbreak and was able to adapt to it in a more severe and arguably better way than other characters like Rick. Shane shed such concepts of guilt, shame and moral correctness in favor of the concept of survival for himself and those he cares about at any cost. From that perspective, Bernthal argued Shane's killing of Otis could be interpreted as the correct course of action in this world because, by slowing Shane down, Otis was negatively affecting Shane's ability to protect the other survivors. However, Bernthal also believes Shane recognizes on some level that shutting down all emotions is an impossible task, even in a zombie-infected world, which makes the character that much more complex and multi-layered. Bernthal called Shane "probably the most emotional character on the show".

While Kirkman likewise called Shane "one of the most nuanced characters on the show", he differed from Bernthal's interpretation of the character in that he believes Rick has adapted better to the new world than Shane. Kirkman believes much of Shane's actions stem from fear and that he is not as prepared for the post-zombie world as he claims. In contrast, Kirkman feels Rick is more centered and better prepared, as illustrated by his ability to act cold and detached at one moment, while kind and sympathetic in another. Kirkman called The Walking Dead "really a tragic story" for Shane, and said of the perception of the character, "I feel like you should be feeling sorry for Shane more than anything." Contrary to the producers' interpretation of the character's morality, fans and critics alike have widely considered Shane to be one of the best villains on The Walking Dead and television.
