= The Walking Dead season 2 =

The Walking Dead
- Season 2
- Promotional poster and home media cover art featuring Rick Grimes
- Showrunner: Glen Mazzara
- Starring: Andrew Lincoln; Jon Bernthal; Sarah Wayne Callies; Laurie Holden; Jeffrey DeMunn; Steven Yeun; Chandler Riggs; Norman Reedus; Melissa McBride
- No. of episodes: 13

Release
- Original network: AMC
- Original release: October 16, 2011 – March 18, 2012

Season chronology
- ← Previous; Season 1 Next → Season 3

The second season of The Walking Dead, an American post-apocalyptic horror television series on AMC, premiered on October 16, 2011, and concluded on March 18, 2012, consisting of 13 episodes. Developed for television by Frank Darabont, the series is based on the eponymous series of comic books by Robert Kirkman, Tony Moore, and Charlie Adlard. It was executive produced by Darabont, Kirkman, Glen Mazzara, David Alpert, and Gale Anne Hurd, with Mazzara assuming the role of showrunner after Darabont's departure from the series.

The season was well received by critics. It won Best Television Presentation at the 38th Saturn Awards and Outstanding Prosthetic Makeup for a Series, Miniseries, Movie, or Special at the 64th Primetime Creative Arts Emmy Awards. The season finale was viewed by 9 million viewers, making it the highest-rated episode of the series up to that point and the most viewed episode of an original series on AMC in history, up until the premiere of the series' third season, which was watched by 10.9 million viewers.

This season adapts material from issues #7–12 of the comic book series and introduces notable comic characters Hershel Greene (Scott Wilson) and his daughter, Maggie (Lauren Cohan). Mainly set at the Greene Family Farm, after the escape and destruction of the CDC, the season continues the story of Rick Grimes (Andrew Lincoln) and his group of survivors as they continue to survive in a post-apocalyptic world overrun by flesh-eating zombies, dubbed "walkers". After leaving Atlanta, Rick and the group are stopped on the highway by a threat unlike anything they have seen before. While searching for someone who has gone missing, the group eventually discovers an isolated farm, where tensions arise among members of the main group, and the mysterious and ignorant inhabitants of the farm, whose secrets and motives are unclear. In the midst of events, Rick and the others try to restore order after a terrible discovery as differences begin to openly erupt between Rick and Shane Walsh (Jon Bernthal).

== Production ==
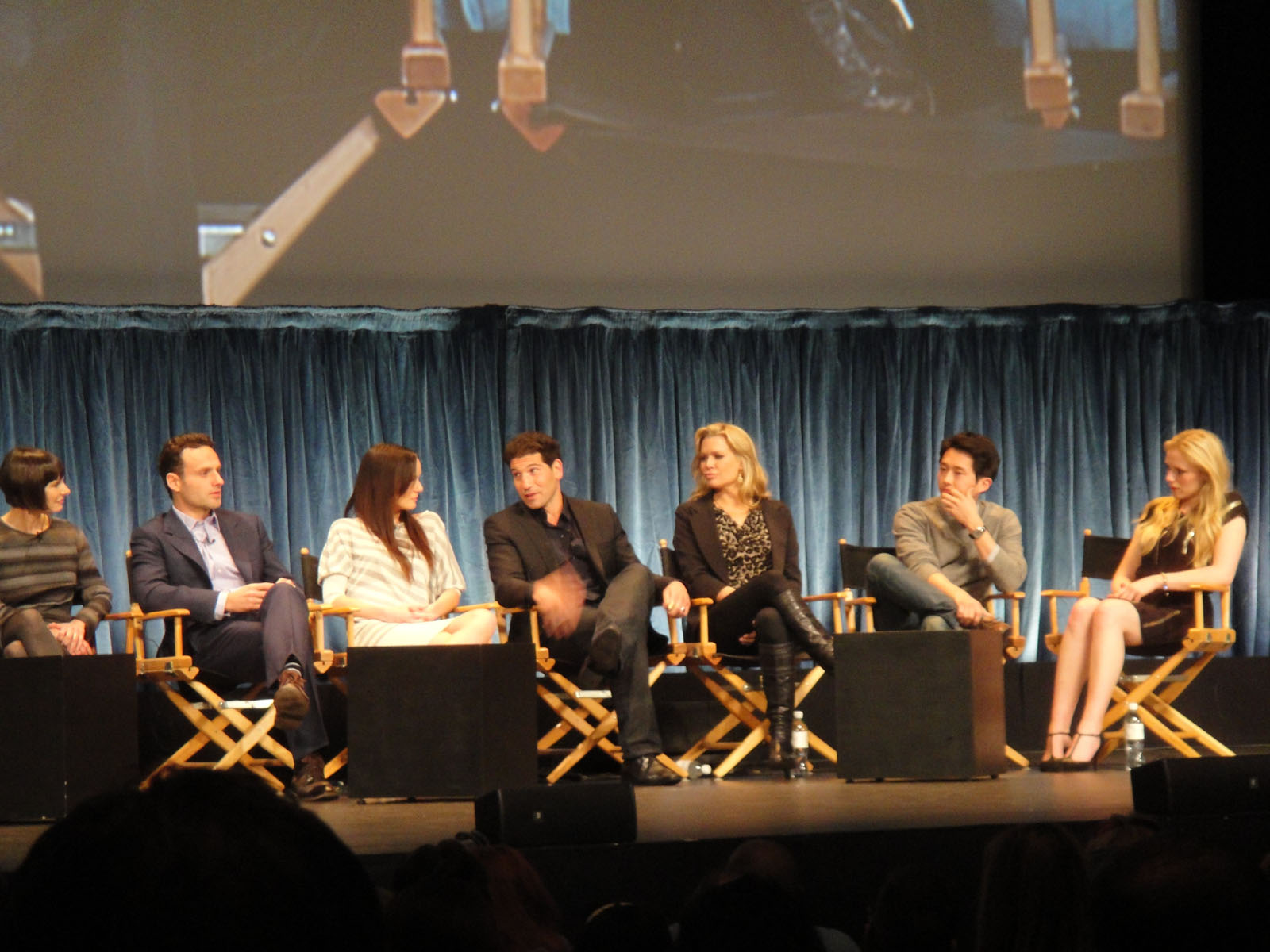
The cast and crew of The Walking Dead at PaleyFest in 2011; (left to right): executive producer Gale Anne Hurd, Andrew Lincoln (Rick Grimes), Sarah Wayne Callies (Lori Grimes), Jon Bernthal (Shane Walsh), Laurie Holden (Andrea), Steven Yeun (Glenn Rhee), and Emma Bell (Amy)

After the first season aired, Deadline Hollywood reported that series developer and showrunner Frank Darabont had let go the entire writing staff and planned to use only freelance writers for the second season. This turned out to be not entirely accurate, and Robert Kirkman was quoted as saying the changes to the writing staff would not affect the production of the show. In February 2011, it was announced that Glen Mazzara, who had written the first season episode "Wildfire", had been hired again as a writer/executive producer for the second season and will put together a staff of five more writers.

At C2E2 members of the cast confirmed that the second season would begin shooting on June 1, 2011, and that Darabont would write the season premiere episode. At the same event, cast members speculated that acclaimed author and long-time Darabont collaborator Stephen King may write an episode. Kirkman later confirmed that along with himself, Darabont and Mazzara the writing staff will consist of Scott M. Gimple, Evan Reilly, Angela Kang and one freelance writer, David Leslie Johnson. Four actors have joined the cast as new characters for season 2—Scott Wilson as Hershel Greene, Lauren Cohan as his daughter Maggie Greene, Pruitt Taylor Vince as Hershel's ranch hand, Otis, and Michael Zegen as Randall.

A preview of season 2 was shown during the fourth season premiere of Breaking Bad on July 17, 2011 and a full length trailer was released to promote season 2 at San Diego Comic-Con on July 22, 2011.

In July 2011, Deadline Hollywood reported that Darabont stepped down from his position as showrunner for the series, amidst rumors that he was unable to adjust to the schedule of running a television series. Executive producer Glen Mazzara succeeded Darabont as showrunner for the series. Darabont's sudden departure further sparked controversy in August when The Hollywood Reporter broke a story revealing that Darabont had in fact been fired due to issues of the show's reduced budget and a strained relationship with AMC executives.

The premiere aired in an extended 90-minute time slot, similar to the pilot episode. After the first seven episodes aired, the series went on a hiatus and returned on February 12, 2012, with the final six episodes of the season airing until its conclusion on March 18, 2012.

=== Webisodes ===
Torn Apart, a six-part web series, premiered on October 3, 2011 on AMC's official website. The web series is directed by special effects makeup artist and co-executive producer Greg Nicotero and tells the origin story of Hannah, also known as "Bicycle Girl", the walker whom Rick Grimes mercy killed in the pilot episode.

=== Talking Dead ===
Following the encore presentation of the second season premiere on October 16, 2011, a live after-show titled Talking Dead, hosted by Chris Hardwick, premiered. The series airs after encore presentations of The Walking Dead on Sunday nights. It features host Chris Hardwick discussing the latest episode with fans, actors, and producers of the show.

== Cast ==
The primary characters of the second season include (from left to right): Rick, Sophia, Carol, Lori, Carl, T-Dog, Glenn, Andrea, Dale, Daryl, and Shane

=== Main cast ===
The second season features eight actors receiving opening credits billing, all returning from the first season; seven are listed as main cast members in the first season, while Norman Reedus and Melissa McBride were promoted from recurring status. While McBride is credited as "Also starring", she is a series regular.

==== Starring ====
- Andrew Lincoln as Rick Grimes, the series' protagonist and a former sheriff's deputy from King County, Georgia. He is the husband of Lori and the father of Carl. Rick has taken leadership from Shane after his actions almost killed them in the previous season.
- Jon Bernthal as Shane Walsh, Rick's close friend and former deputy sheriff. He had a love affair with Lori in the previous season, believing that Rick had died, which has turned into jealousy towards Rick, forming an intense rivalry. Shane is also the main antagonist of the season.
- Sarah Wayne Callies as Lori Grimes, Rick's emotionally fragile wife and mother of Carl. She had a love affair with Shane in the previous season, which has put her and Shane at odds.
- Laurie Holden as Andrea, a former civil rights attorney, who has formed a close bond with Dale. She deals with suicidal tendencies after the loss of her sister Amy by trying to contribute more to the group's safety by becoming a sharpshooter. She falls in with Shane throughout the season, growing accustomed to the world around her.
- Jeffrey DeMunn as Dale Horvath, an older member of the group, who owns the RV with which the group travels. He is often the voice of reason and has formed a protectiveness over Andrea. Dale becomes a mentor to the group, especially to Rick and Glenn, and is also a good friend of T-Dog.
- Steven Yeun as Glenn Rhee, a former pizza delivery boy, who saved Rick's life in the previous season. He is an integral member of the group and does many supply runs for them. Glenn cares very much for the core group of survivors.
- Chandler Riggs as Carl Grimes, Rick and Lori's young son, whose innocence has slowly declined due to the brutality of the world around him, even wanting to use a firearm.
- Norman Reedus as Daryl Dixon, an antihero-like Southern redneck, the group's hunter, and expert tracker. He is less friendly with the group and maintains a careless facade, but is reasonable enough to fight alongside them when needed and is the most active in the group for the search for Sophia.

==== Also starring ====
- Melissa McBride as Carol Peletier, a former victim of domestic abuse, who has found new strength after the death of her abusive husband Ed.

=== Supporting cast ===
- IronE Singleton as Theodore "T-Dog" Douglas, a member of the group and a man of honor, duty, and well-intentions who feels underappreciated and tries to contribute as much as possible. He also has a strong friendship with Dale.
- Lauren Cohan as Maggie Greene, Hershel's elder tomboyish daughter, who is strong-willed and determined, yet slightly stubborn. Maggie is, like her father, ignorant of what the walkers are.
- Emily Kinney as Beth Greene, Hershel's younger daughter and Maggie's half-sister. She is shy, soft-spoken and compassionate, but lacks the strong-will of her sister.
- Scott Wilson as Hershel Greene, a veterinarian and religious farmer, who is blinded by his own refusal to accept the world's new state, believing that the walkers are just sick.
- Jane McNeill as Patricia, Otis' quiet wife and Hershel's medical aid.
- James Allen McCune as Jimmy, Beth's protective and helpful boyfriend.
- Madison Lintz as Sophia Peletier, Carol's daughter and Carl's best friend.

=== Guest cast ===
- Michael Zegen as Randall Culver, a teenager, whom Rick, Glenn and Hershel encounter as part of another group.
- Pruitt Taylor Vince as Otis, Hershel's ranch hand and Patricia's husband.
- Adam Minarovich as Ed Peletier, Carol's deceased abusive husband; seen in a flashback sequence.
- Michael Raymond-James as Dave, a member of Randall's group, who runs into Rick, Glenn and Hershel.
- Michael Rooker as Merle Dixon, Daryl's violent and unreasonable older brother, who disappeared in the first season; seen in Daryl's hallucination.

== Episodes ==
No. overall	No. in season	Title	Directed by	Written by	Original release date	U.S. viewers (millions)
7	1	"What Lies Ahead"	Ernest Dickerson; Gwyneth Horder-Payton	Ardeth Bey and Robert Kirkman	October 16, 2011	7.26
Rick leads the group out of Atlanta towards Fort Benning. They hide from a herd of walkers, but Carol's daughter Sophia is chased away and goes missing. Meanwhile, Andrea blames Dale for preventing her suicide at the CDC. Dale withholds her gun from her. Shane resents Rick for usurping his leadership over the group and his intimacy with Lori and Carl and plans to leave. Rick and Daryl lead a mass search effort for Sophia. Rick prays for a sign that he is leading the group on the right path. Minutes later, Carl is shot.
8	2	"Bloodletting"	Ernest Dickerson	Glen Mazzara	October 23, 2011	6.70
Otis, the accidental shooter, directs Rick to a farmstead owned by veterinarian Hershel Greene. Hershel stabilizes Carl but requires further medical supplies to operate. Rick searches for hope while Hershel tries to persuade him that mankind will cure the disease. Shane supports Rick and vows to save Carl. Otis leads Shane to a local FEMA shelter to retrieve the supplies for Carl, but they become trapped inside by a walker horde.
9	3	"Save the Last One"	Phil Abraham	Scott M. Gimple	October 30, 2011	6.10
In a flashforward, Shane shaves his head. While searching for Sophia, Andrea finds a hanged walker and again ponders suicide. Glenn leads the others to the farm and probes his own faith with Hershel's daughter Maggie. Lori doubts whether Carl should live in this world, but Rick convinces her to maintain hope. Shane returns alone with the medical supplies, claiming that Otis sacrificed himself. Hershel saves Carl. In a flashback, Shane sacrifices Otis and leaves him as bait so that he can escape. Otis rips out a clump of Shane's hair in a failed last-ditch effort. Shane shaves his head.
10	4	"Cherokee Rose"	Billy Gierhart	Evan Reilly	November 6, 2011	6.29
The group mourns Otis. Shane wrestles with his decision while training Andrea to shoot. Glenn accompanies Maggie to a local pharmacy, where they impulsively have sex. After searching for Sophia, Daryl gifts Carol a Cherokee Rose as a sign of hope. Lori learns that she is pregnant.
11	5	"Chupacabra"	Guy Ferland	David Leslie Johnson	November 13, 2011	6.12
Shane pushes Rick to abandon the search for Sophia but Rick refuses, feeling personally responsible. While searching for Sophia, Daryl falls down a steep cliff and becomes severely injured. After hallucinating his abusive brother Merle, Daryl pulls himself up the slope and returns to the farm. Hershel grows unnerved with the group's presence and bids them to leave soon. Glenn discovers that Hershel is hiding walkers in the barn.
12	6	"Secrets"	David Boyd	Angela Kang	November 20, 2011	6.08
Glenn sits nervously on the secrets of Lori's pregnancy and the barn walkers. He eventually spills them to Dale, who learns that some of the barn walkers are Hershel's family. Glenn and Maggie return to the pharmacy to retrieve supplies for Lori but Maggie is attacked by a walker. Shane threatens Dale when he probes the story of Otis' death. Lori grapples alone with her pregnancy but Rick finds out and confronts her. She reveals the affair with Shane and Rick accepts it.
13	7	"Pretty Much Dead Already"	Michelle MacLaren	Scott M. Gimple	November 27, 2011	6.62
Glenn reveals the barn to the group. Shane is furious, urging the group to kill the walkers or abandon the farm. Rick confronts Hershel, who believes the walkers to be curable. After her encounter at the pharmacy, Maggie opposes this view. In love with Glenn, she discourages Hershel from exiling Rick's group. Rick reveals Lori's pregnancy to Shane, who becomes unhinged and overprotective. Dale foresees Shane's actions and tries to hide the gun bag in the swamp, but Shane follows and steals it back. Hershel takes Rick to capture walkers for the barn, but Shane shoots them and proves that they are incurable. Shane opens the barn and massacres the walkers inside. The final walker is Sophia. While the others freeze, Rick steps forward and puts her down.
14	8	"Nebraska"	Clark Johnson	Evan Reilly	February 12, 2012	8.10
The group mourns their losses. Beth collapses into a catatonic shock at the loss of her mother, who was in the barn. Meanwhile, Hershel flees to the local bar in town, relapsing into old drinking habits to mask his guilt and hopelessness. Lori learns that Shane sacrificed Otis. She tries to rescue Rick and Hershel herself but crashes her car. Rick and Glenn find Hershel and convince him to return to the farm but two strangers, Dave and Tony, enter the bar and aggressively question them. Rick is forced to kill them.
15	9	"Triggerfinger"	Billy Gierhart	David Leslie Johnson	February 19, 2012	6.89
Shane rescues Lori and, in love with her, argues that they should be together. At the bar, Dave and Tony's friends investigate the gunfire. Rick attempts to negotiate but a shootout ensues. The enemy group leaves, abandoning an injured teenager named Randall. Rick saves him and brings him back to the farm, where the group debates whether Randall poses a threat. Shane predicts a violent conflict with Randall's group. Lori fears Shane and urges Rick to confront him.
16	10	"18 Miles Out"	Ernest Dickerson	Scott M. Gimple & Glen Mazzara	February 26, 2012	7.04
Rick confronts Shane for killing Otis and advancing on Lori. Shane apologizes and seemingly submits. They move to exile Randall, but he reveals that he knows Maggie and Hershel. As they dispute Randall's fate, Shane contends that Rick can't protect the group and they fight. The brawl unleashes a pack of walkers. Rick is tempted to abandon Shane but rescues him and offers him a second chance. Meanwhile, Lori and Maggie try to inspire a suicidal Beth. Andrea lets Beth make her attempt and she changes her mind.
17	11	"Judge, Jury, Executioner"	Greg Nicotero	Angela Kang	March 4, 2012	6.77
Daryl tortures Randall and learns that he is from a large group of unruly men. In a rare occasion, Rick and Shane agree that he must be executed. Dale tries to convince them to spare Randall, probing the group's humanity, but he and Daryl see that the group is broken. Meanwhile, Carl steals a gun and aims to shoot a walker in the swamps but gets scared and flees. The group votes to execute Randall, but Rick refuses when Carl encourages it. Dale is gutted by the walker from the swamps. Daryl mercifully puts him down.
18	12	"Better Angels"	Guy Ferland	Evan Reilly & Glen Mazzara	March 11, 2012	6.89
Rick vows to honor Dale by "unbreaking" the group. Carl avoids his gun and regrets Dale's fate, but Rick encourages him to protect himself. Lori thanks Shane for saving her and Carl during Rick's coma. Rick and Daryl plan to abandon Randall, but Shane, moved by Lori's speech, kills him and frames it as an escape attempt. Daryl and Glenn find Randall as a walker despite having no bites. Meanwhile, Shane leads Rick deep into the woods to kill him, but Rick stabs Shane and blames him for forcing this upon them. Carl finds Rick mourning at Shane's body. To Rick's surprise, Shane reanimates, and Carl puts him down. The gunshot draws a local herd of walkers towards the farm.
19	13	"Beside the Dying Fire"	Ernest Dickerson	Robert Kirkman & Glen Mazzara	March 18, 2012	8.99
Rick and Carl escape the walker herd. Hershel leads an effort to defend the farm but is forced to evacuate. Andrea becomes separated from the group and meets a mysterious hooded woman. The group reunites on the highway, where Daryl reveals Randall's fate. The group poses questions. Rick reveals that everyone is infected and will reanimate after death, a fact he learned from Jenner at the CDC. The group is shaken by Rick's secrecy and question his leadership. Rick reveals that he killed Shane, upsetting Lori and Carl, and invites everyone to leave. When they stay, he declares himself dictator. In the distance, the prison looms.

== Reception ==
=== Critical response ===
The second season of The Walking Dead has received positive reviews from critics. On Metacritic, the season holds a score of 80 out of 100, indicating "generally favorable" reviews, based on 22 critics. On Rotten Tomatoes, the season holds an 80% with an average rating of 8.05 out of 10, based on 24 reviews. The site's critical consensus reads: "The second season of The Walking Dead fleshes out the characters while maintaining the grueling tension and gore that made the show a hit." Linda Stasi of the New York Post wrote: "You'll be happy to know that at least as far as the first two episodes go ... the show is better than ever – which would have seemed impossible." Robert Bianco of USA Today also praised the direction in which the second season was heading stating that the show delivers "edge-of-your-chair tension" and also noting that "what separates this fine series from similar shows is the honesty of its human interactions".

Conversely, some critics were less enthused midway through the second season, including Ken Tucker of Entertainment Weekly who described the season as "a nighttime soap with occasional appearances by deceased but moving, flesh-rotting, flesh-eating cameo monsters" adding that it "had not been dramatic enough" or had a "tendency ... to botch truly dramatic situations". Nate Rawlings of Time magazine criticized the season's pacing, writing: "The first half of this season has been brutally slow." Following the season's finale, Scott Wampler of Collider described the second half of the season as "far more intense, more interesting, better written" despite "a helluva lot of water-treading" in the first half. Kevin Yeoman of Screen Rant further emphasized this point, writing: "It was with the last half of season 2 – arguably the last four episodes – where the writers succeeded in unshackling themselves from the intermittent monotony brought about by the serial nature of the show."

The Walking Dead season 2: Critical reception by episode
Season 2 (2011–12): Percentage of positive critics' reviews tracked by the website Rotten Tomatoes

=== Accolades ===
The second season of The Walking Dead received three nominations for the 64th Primetime Creative Arts Emmy Awards, winning Outstanding Prosthetic Makeup for a Series, Miniseries, Movie, or Special (for the episode "What Lies Ahead"), and received nominations for Outstanding Sound Editing for a Series and Outstanding Special Visual Effects (both for the episode "Beside the Dying Fire").

The season also won Best Television Presentation, for the second consecutive year, at the 38th Saturn Awards, while Norman Reedus was nominated for Best Supporting Actor on Television. Additionally, the second half of the season was nominated for Outstanding Performance by a Stunt Ensemble in a Television Series at the 19th Screen Actors Guild Awards.

=== Ratings ===
On October 16, 2011, the season two premiere set a new record of 7.3 million viewers. The episode also set new records for the most viewers in the 18-49 and 25-54 demographics, with 4.8 million and 4.2 million viewers respectively, making it the most watched episode of a drama in the history of basic cable television in these measures. The original broadcast and the two subsequent encore presentations of the episode drew a collective total of 11 million viewers. On February 12, 2012, the show's mid-season premiere beat its previous record by attaining 8.1 million viewers, 5.4 million in the 18-49 key demographic, despite airing at the same time as the second most watched Grammy Awards in history. The series once again beat its own record with the airing of the season two finale on March 18, 2012, which received 9 million viewers.

Viewership and ratings per episode of The Walking Dead season 2
No.	Title	Air date	Rating (18–49)	Viewers (millions)
1	"What Lies Ahead"	October 16, 2011	3.8	7.26
2	"Bloodletting"	October 23, 2011	3.6	6.70
3	"Save the Last One"	October 30, 2011	3.1	6.10
4	"Cherokee Rose"	November 6, 2011	3.4	6.29
5	"Chupacabra"	November 13, 2011	3.2	6.12
6	"Secrets"	November 20, 2011	3.1	6.08
7	"Pretty Much Dead Already"	November 27, 2011	3.5	6.62
8	"Nebraska"	February 12, 2012	4.2	8.10
9	"Triggerfinger"	February 19, 2012	3.6	6.89
10	"18 Miles Out"	February 26, 2012	3.8	7.04
11	"Judge, Jury, Executioner"	March 4, 2012	3.5	6.77
12	"Better Angels"	March 11, 2012	3.6	6.89
13	"Beside the Dying Fire"	March 18, 2012	4.7	8.99

== Home media releases ==
Limited Edition Blu-ray packaging showing a screwdriver in a zombie's eye socket

The second season was released on DVD and Blu-ray in region 1 on August 28, 2012, in region 2 on August 27, 2012, and in region 4 on June 20, 2012. Special features include eleven featurettes—"All the Guts Inside", "Live or Let Die", "The Meat of the Music", "Fire on Set", "The Ink is Alive", "The Sound of the Effects", "In the Dead Water", "You Could Make a Killing", "She Will Fight", "The Cast on Season 2", and "Extras Wardrobe". Six audio commentaries are also featured, for episodes "What Lies Ahead", "Pretty Much Dead Already", "Nebraska", "Judge, Jury, Executioner", and "Beside the Dying Fire". Also included is the six-part webisode series The Walking Dead: Torn Apart, with optional commentary by Greg Nicotero, and 30 minutes of deleted scenes across eight episodes, with optional commentary by Glen Mazzara.

The second season was also released in a limited edition Blu-ray packaging, featuring a zombie head with a screwdriver in the zombie's eye socket, a recreation of a scene from the second season premiere. The limited edition packaging was designed by Greg Nicotero and sculpted by McFarlane Toys.
