= Nebraska (The Walking Dead) =

- The Walking Dead episode
- Rick talks with Hershel at a bar.
- Episode no.: Season 2 Episode 8
- Directed by: Clark Johnson
- Written by: Evan Reilly
- Cinematography by: Rohn Schmidt
- Editing by: Nathan D. Gunn; Julius Ramsay
- Original air date: February 12, 2012

Guest appearances
- IronE Singleton as Theodore "T-Dog" Douglas; Madison Lintz as Sophia Peletier; Lauren Cohan as Maggie Greene; Emily Kinney as Beth Greene; Michael Raymond-James as Dave; Scott Wilson as Hershel Greene; Jane McNeill as Patricia; James Allen McCune as Jimmy; Aaron Munoz as Tony; Amber Chaney as Annette Greene

Episode chronology
← Previous "Pretty Much Dead Already"	Next → "Triggerfinger"
- The Walking Dead season 2

"Nebraska" is the eighth episode and mid-season premiere of the second season of the post-apocalyptic horror television series The Walking Dead. It originally aired on AMC in the United States on February 12, 2012. In the episode, the survivors deal with the aftermath of the barn shooting, which causes Hershel Greene (Scott Wilson) to order Rick's group to leave and then start drinking and disappear from the group, leading Rick Grimes (Andrew Lincoln) and Glenn (Steven Yeun) to try to find him. Meanwhile, Dale Horvath (Jeffrey DeMunn) becomes more suspicious of Shane Walsh's (Jon Bernthal) actions.

"Nebraska" was written by Evan Reilly and directed by Clark Johnson. Two trailers were released as part of promoting the episode; the former aired shortly after the broadcast of its predecessor, "Pretty Much Dead Already", while the latter premiered a month preceding the airing of "Nebraska". Following the broadcast of the episode, The Walking Dead took a three-month hiatus from television. It features guest appearances from Michael Raymond-James and Aaron Munoz, as well as appearances from several recurring actors and actresses including Lauren Cohan, Scott Wilson, Emily Kinney and IronE Singleton.

The episode received general acclaim from television critics, who praised the episode's concluding scene alongside the character development and storylines. Upon airing, it attained 8.10 million viewers and a 4.2 rating in the 18-49 demographic, according to Nielsen ratings. "Nebraska" achieved the strongest demographic ratings out of any basic cable telecast in history until the airing of the series' second-season finale. The episode became the highest-rated basic cable television program of the day, as well as the most-viewed cable program of the week.

This episode marks the final appearance of Madison Lintz (Sophia Peletier).

== Plot ==
Hershel Greene's reanimated wife is discovered to have survived the walker massacre and attacks Beth before Andrea finally puts her down. With all of the barn walkers subdued, Hershel demands Rick and his group leave the farm and insists that he didn't know about Sophia being in the barn, suggesting that Otis must have found her before his death as an explanation. Rick confronts Shane regarding his actions leading to this, but Shane considers Rick as delusional as Hershel and berates him for wasting time. The group decides to bury the walker bodies of Hershel's wife and stepson as well as Carol's daughter Sophia, while burning the rest of the walkers. They hold a makeshift memorial service for Sophia, but Carol refuses to attend. She falls into a deep depression, going off into the woods to pull up flowers, including a Cherokee Rose that has been a sign of hope for her. Shane finds her and helps return her to the camp as he holds her hands to wash the cuts that she obtained while apologizing to her that he had no idea her daughter was in the barn.

Hershel throws out his wife's belongings and then disappears. His absence is not noted until his younger daughter Beth collapses and goes into a catatonic state. Hershel's family believes he may have started drinking again as Hershel is an alcoholic who has been sober for a number of years. As the others tend to Beth, Rick and Glenn travel to a nearby town to look for Hershel.

Dale talks to the others to try to get a sense of Shane's actions. He later speaks to Lori about Shane's erratic behavior, his suspicion that Shane had killed Otis to escape a walker horde, and his fear Shane may kill someone else soon. As Beth's condition worsens, Lori asks Daryl to drive into town to check on Rick, but Daryl refuses, saying his days of searching for someone are over. Lori opts to go alone, but en route, her car hits a walker and is overturned.

In the town, Rick and Glenn find Hershel alone in a tavern, drinking and lamenting the loss of his family members. Rick eventually convinces Hershel to return, but as they are about to leave, two suspicious men from Philadelphia enter the bar—Dave (Michael Raymond-James) and Tony (Aaron Munoz). They reveal that Rick's goal of Fort Benning may be overrun and try to goad where the group's farm is, looking for a safe haven. Suspicious of their behavior, Rick refuses to disclose the farm's location. The two men try to kill Rick, who kills both of them in self-defense, marking the first time he'd killed living people since he woke up from his coma.

The episode ends with the remaining group burning the rest of the walkers.

== Production ==
"Nebraska" was written by Evan Reilly and directed by Clark Johnson. Following the broadcast of the previous installment, "Pretty Much Dead Already", The Walking Dead took a three-month hiatus from television. Two trailers were released as part of an advertising campaign for the episode; the first was broadcast after "Pretty Much Dead Already" aired, while the second aired in January 2012. A promotional image was released shortly thereafter, which featured Rick Grimes holding up a gun at Sophia. The first three minutes of "Nebraska" were leaked online.

The episode introduces two new characters to the series, portrayed by Aaron Munoz (Tony) and Michael Raymond-James (Dave). Although they were killed off in the episode, writer Robert Kirkman wanted to evoke a reaction that the characters would recur throughout the series. "With the casting of those two guys and everything involving that scene we were really trying to convince the audience that they were going to be new regulars, so the end would be that much more shocking." Kirkman felt that Tony and Dave represent new threats and anxieties for the group. "I think this was a particularly good episode coming back because the two guys in the bar represent new threats and they are really just the tip of the iceberg," he stated. "It's really good to come back and be off of the farm and see that there are more dangerous things out there than the zombies. Things just keep getting worse from here.". "The Regulator" by Clutch was the song used as the closing title sequence.

Johnson devised the scene in which Rick shot and killed Dave and Tony in a bar, and presented it to Reilly. Johnson sought to authorize man's animalistic qualities during a state of disaster. Reilly contacted showrunner Glen Mazzara via cell phone, and wanted to add the scene to the episode's script. "That was an incredible scene," reflected Lincoln. "We were so lucky to get such cracking actors. And we didn't play the problem, we just played the fact that this is a reunion of human beings. The tension is inherent in the fact that they encounter this other group."

"Nebraska" contains a stunt sequence, in which Lori Grimes slams into a walker, causing her to swerve on the side of the road and overturn her car. Kirkman said of the scene: "I had nothing to do with it. But it did turn out really well. I love the trailers for this season where it's like, "This is happening: People shooting guns! Cars are flipping!'"

== Title reference ==
Tony shares with Rick the rumors survivor groups have circulated about safe destinations. Nebraska is one such rumored location, considered safe – Dave explains – because of its low population and numerous guns. When Rick refuses safe haven at the farm to Dave and Tony, Dave asks where else he would suggest they go. Rick's reply, "I don't know, I hear Nebraska's nice", triggers Tony and Dave to draw their guns on Rick, who shoots them first.

Nebraska was also notable as "Ground Zero" (i.e., the target of) Russian nuclear bombs in the 1950s and '60s, in the event of a nuclear war. Therefore, the Federal Civil Defense Administration (FCDA) devised plans that would give civilians a chance to survive a nuclear war, and cartons of "Nebraskits" (compressed biscuits made from grain) and dairy-based milk bars, collectively designed to satisfy survivors' nutritional requirements during a stay in a fallout shelter, were stored in fallout shelters throughout the United States.

== Reception ==
=== Ratings ===
"Nebraska" was originally broadcast on February 12, 2012, in the United States on AMC. Upon airing, the episode garnered 8.10 million viewers and a 4.2 rating in the 18-49 demographic, making it the most-viewed episode of the series thus far. Following two encore presentations, total viewership accumulated to 10.1 million. The episode attained 5.4 million viewers in the 18-49 demographic, while subsequently obtaining 4.4 million viewers in the 25–54 demographic; this makes "Nebraska" the highest-rated basic cable telecast in history demographically up until the airing of the second-season finale, "Beside the Dying Fire". The accolade was previously held by the second-season premiere, "What Lies Ahead", which received 4.8 million spectators amongst adults in the 18-49 demographic and 4.2 million viewers in the 25–54 demographic. "Nebraska" became the highest-rated basic cable program of the day, as well as the most-watched basic cable telecast of the week dated February 12. Ratings and total viewership increased significantly from the previous installment, "Pretty Much Dead Already", which garnered 6.62 million viewers and a 3.5 ratings amongst key adults between 18 and 49.

"Nebraska" debuted in 122 countries worldwide in 35 languages. In the United Kingdom, the episode garnered 737,200 viewers thus making it the most-viewed television program of the week on FX. "Nebraska" attracted a 3.05 rating in the 18-49 demographic, translating to 558,400 viewers. It subsequently becoming the highest-rated telecast on pay television. Similarly, "Nebraska" achieved the highest demographic ratings out of any pay television program in Spain and Italy, where it attained a 3.93 rating (193,080 viewers) and a 3.26 rating (215,264) in the 18-49 demographic, respectively. In Spain, the episode received 330,000 viewers and aired simultaneously with an episode of Castle, ultimately outperforming it by 78%. In Italy, it obtained 328,180 spectators, denoting a 19% increase from "What Lies Ahead". "Nebraska" performed well demographically in several Latin American countries. In Chile, the episode garnered a 0.78 in the 18-49 demographic, thereby becoming the highest-rated telecast on pay television there. It outperformed its timeslot in that respective demographic by 136%. Similarly, "Nebraska" outperformed the timeslot average by 24% in Argentina, ultimately attaining a 0.88 rating amongst adults in the 18-49 group. In Mexico and Colombia, the episode obtained a 2.19 rating and a 1.07 rating in the 18-49 demographic, respectively.

=== Critical response ===
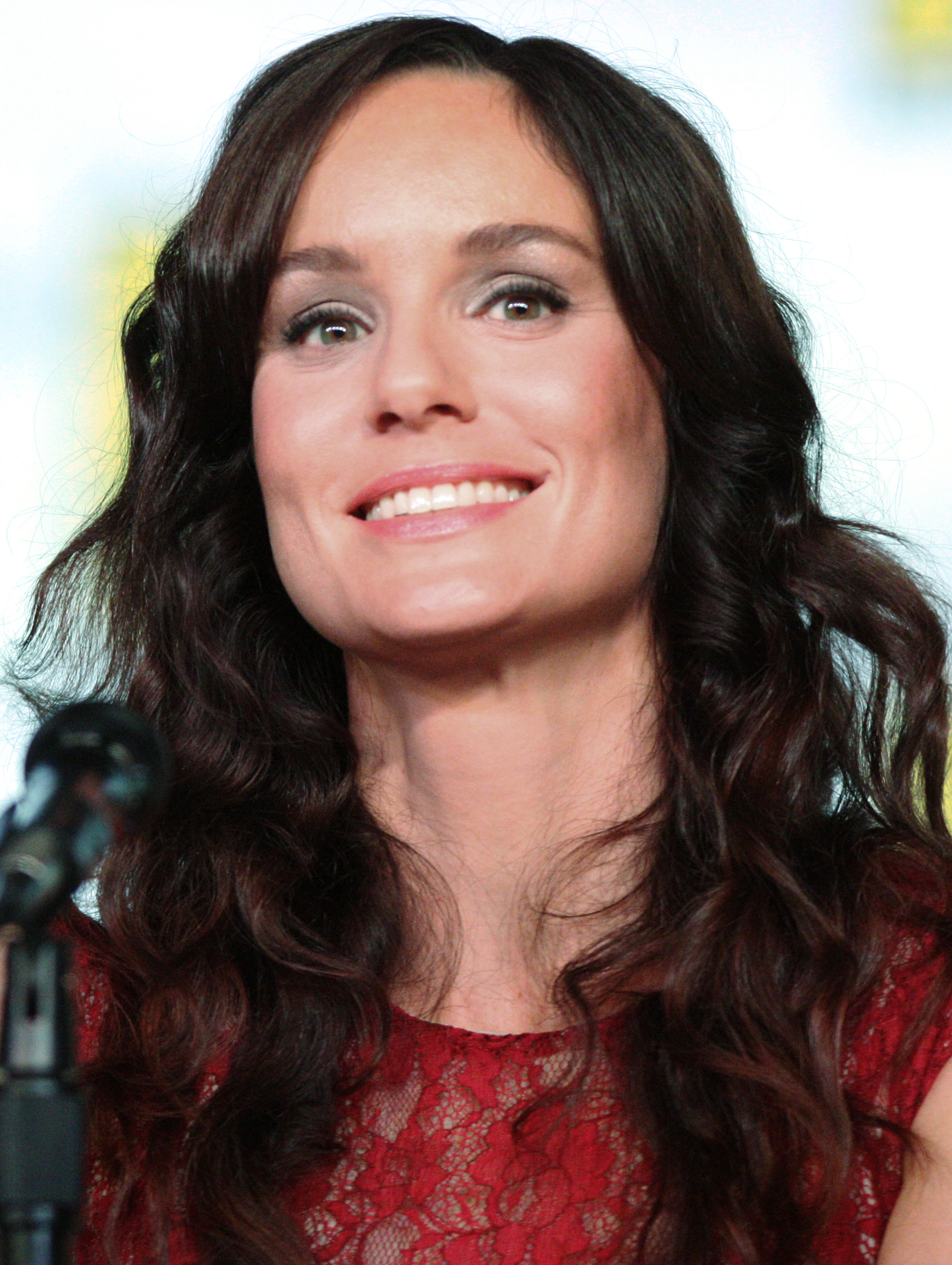
The character development of Lori Grimes (Sarah Wayne Callies, pictured) was panned by critics.

"Nebraska" was widely lauded by television commentators. Alex Strachan of the Ottawa Citizen felt that the episode was very poignant, adding that various scenes were "beautifully acted". In his A− review, Verne Gay of Newsday opined that "Nebraska" accurately established the progression of a dark atmosphere for the second half of the season. Rawlings asserted that the episode gives the audience "plenty to chew on", and that it nicely sets up a foundation for future storylines. The A.V. Club's Zack Halden evoked similar sentiments; "'Nebraska' doesn’t entirely rectify this concern, but it’s a solid hour of television, and a promising indication of where the series is headed." Writing for IGN, Eric Goldman commended the installment's sense of direction; "I liked how this episode thrust us right back into it, and the understandable misery everyone was going through. [...] It was a mixture of chaos, sadness and zombie killing—a mixture this show can do very well." Concluding his review, Goldman issued "Nebraska" an eight out of ten, signifying a "great" rating. The Atlantic's Scott Meslow iterated: "'Nebraska' largely spends its first two acts reiterating things that happened earlier in the season, which in this case can somewhat be forgiven [...]. But just when it looks as though the series will devote another episode to wheel-spinning, "Nebraska" surprises with a final act that serves as a reminder of why it's too soon to give up on The Walking Dead." Morgan Jeffrey of Digital Spy noted that it successfully addressed the concerns of fans about the episodic pace, while also raising expectations for succeeding installments. Not all reviewers were enthusiastic about the episode as the general consensus. Boston Herald journalist Mark Perigard affirmed that "Nebraska" was inferior to its predecessor, ultimately giving it a C+ grade. Starlee Kine of New York wrote that it was "just one huge whirlpool of pointless drama, pulling everything in its path under with it", while Entertainment Weekly writer Darren Franich thought that it was a setback from the previous episode.

Commentators criticized the character development of Lori Grimes. Goldman was angry upon viewing the crash sequence, avouching that it stunted any development intended for the scene. He stated, "The Walking Dead really needs to work on strengthening its female characters, and it doesn't help when Lori has a major accident for such a stupid reason, getting distracted as she looked at a map while she drove. Yeah, yeah, there was a zombie in the road, but it could have been an animal [...] just as easily, and it really undercut the intended drama of her situation when it just seems so stupid that it happened at all." Halden thought that the foundation set up for furthering storyline progression was contrived, while Aaron Rutkoff of The Wall Street Journal said that the premise of the dilemma made no sense. Jeffery was much more optimistic about the scene, ultimately evaluating it as a "jaw-dropping moment".

Critics adulated the character development of Rick Grimes, as well as the concluding scene of "Nebraska". Kine appreciated the attempt to incorporate a suspenseful feeling in the series. She wrote: "Mazzara wants to infuse some horror movie suspense back into the show and his intentions are evident in this scene. Even though I personally didn’t find it that tense, I appreciated the effort. It means that the show is trying to expand and become about something bigger." Los Angeles Times' Gina McIntyre felt that Rick emulated Justified character Raylan Givens, and Halden commented that Rick was becoming "something of a badass". Halden further praised the conclusion of the episode, calling it the series' best scenes. "This is one of the best scenes I’ve seen on the show so far, and it does any number of things that The Walking Dead has struggled with in the past," he opined. "The tension builds naturally [...], the dialogue has actual subtext, and there’s a clear sense of risk here that never pauses to telegraph itself." Meslow affirmed that the scene was an achievement for the writers. "There are characters with new information [...]," Meslow commented. "There is dialogue with subtext [...]. There is intriguing parallel plotting [...]. And there's the surprisingly swift, violent dénouement, when Rick guns down Dave and Tony before they can do the same to him. It's a necessary action, given the circumstances, but it also rings in an honest-to-god character change for our hero, who, having dispatched zombie Sophia, seems to have developed a new recognition of the ruthlessness and self-centeredness it may take to survive in this new world order." HitFix writer Alan Sepinwall appreciated James' performance, and opined that the scene was "as suspenseful as any the show has ever done featuring actual monsters".

Jeffrey complimented Bernthal's performance, while Josh Wigler of MTV celebrated his scene with DeMunn. Wigler summated: "Jon Bernthal and Jeffrey DeMunn are very likely the finest actors on The Walking Dead, and their increasingly tense interactions have been a highlight in recent episodes. 'Nebraska' was no exception, with Shane giving Dale an earful about 'Barnageddon' and why he did what he had to do."
