= Pretty Much Dead Already =

- The Walking Dead episode
- Rick tries to convince Hershel to let his group of survivors stay at his farm.
- Episode no.: Season 2 Episode 7
- Directed by: Michelle MacLaren
- Written by: Scott M. Gimple
- Cinematography by: Rohn Schmidt
- Editing by: Julius Ramsay
- Original air date: November 27, 2011

Guest appearances
- IronE Singleton as Theodore "T-Dog" Douglas; Madison Lintz as Sophia Peletier; Lauren Cohan as Maggie Greene; Emily Kinney as Beth Greene; Scott Wilson as Hershel Greene; Jane McNeill as Patricia; James Allen McCune as Jimmy

Episode chronology
| ← Previous "Secrets" | Next → "Nebraska" |
- The Walking Dead season 2

"Pretty Much Dead Already" is the seventh episode and mid-season finale of the second season of the post-apocalyptic horror television series The Walking Dead. It originally aired on AMC in the United States on November 27, 2011. In the episode, Glenn (Steven Yeun) reveals to the group that there are walkers in the Greenes' barn, dividing the group on what to do. Hershel Greene (Scott Wilson) sets a deadline for the group to leave, unless Rick Grimes (Andrew Lincoln) does a difficult task. Meanwhile, Shane Walsh (Jon Bernthal) slowly loses his sanity after many secrets around him are revealed and Carol Peletier begins to question whether her daughter Sophia will be found.

The episode was written by Scott M. Gimple and directed by Michelle MacLaren. The death of Sophia Peletier is a prominent theme in "Pretty Much Dead Already"; she was killed by Grimes following her conversion into a walker. Robert Kirkman felt that killing Sophia off would add more dimension to the show, and create more flexibility regarding the progression of the storylines, as well as leading to very different storylines from the comic series, with Carol outliving her daughter, as opposed to the other way around. "Pretty Much Dead Already" generated acclaim from critics, who praised the episode's conclusion and the development of the characters. Upon airing in the United States, the episode attained 6.62 million viewers and a 3.5 rating in the 18-49 demographic, according to Nielsen ratings. It became the highest-rated cable telecast of the day, as well as the fourth most-viewed cable program of the week.

== Plot ==
Glenn, at the urging of Dale, finally tells the group that the Greene family's barn is full of walkers. The group inspects the barn, and Shane believes they should clear the barn, but Rick believes they need to get Hershel's blessing since they are still guests on his property. Shane criticizes Rick for continuing the seemingly pointless search for Carol's daughter Sophia, infuriating Daryl.

Later, Maggie Greene confronts Glenn about revealing the barn's secret to the group, but Glenn says her personal well-being is more important than her affections. Carol tries to stop Daryl from searching for Sophia alone, but he later comes back to show her another Cherokee rose blooming, helping to restore Carol's faith they will find Sophia. Elsewhere, Rick confronts Shane about his defiant attitude. The two argue until Rick exclaims that Lori is pregnant. As Rick leaves, Shane congratulates him, but is shocked and scared by this revelation.

Rick approaches Hershel about the walkers in the barn, but Hershel refuses to allow them to harm the walkers. He, Maggie, and Jimmy bring Rick to a forest swamp where two walkers are stuck. Hershel insists that if Rick's group is to stay on his farm, they must treat the walkers as people, and shows Rick how to snare and lead the walkers back.

Meanwhile, Shane confronts Lori about her pregnancy, believing himself to be the father. Lori denies this, and Shane storms off, but Carl stops him, insisting that they stay and search for Sophia. Dale, witnessing this, warns Andrea about Shane's erratic behavior, and then distracts the others long enough to take the weapons from the camp and to hide them in the swamp. Shane discovers the missing weapons and tracks down Dale, demanding he return them. Dale gives in to Shane, but warns him about losing his humanity. Shane replies that they are "pretty much dead already".

Shane arms the rest of the group and they converge on the barn just as Hershel, Rick, and the others return with the snared walkers. Shane screams that walkers are not people and repeatedly shoots one of the captive walkers in the chest to prove its undead nature to Hershel before breaking the locks off the barn doors. Walkers start to file out, and Shane, Andrea, T-Dog, Daryl, and Glenn execute the zombies while the others watch. At the last moment, a bitten Sophia emerges from the barn, dead and zombified. The group is paralyzed with shock and sadness, unable to act as Sophia walks towards them. Carol runs toward her undead daughter and is stopped and held back by an equally anguished Daryl. Only Rick is able to step forward and shoot her.

== Production ==
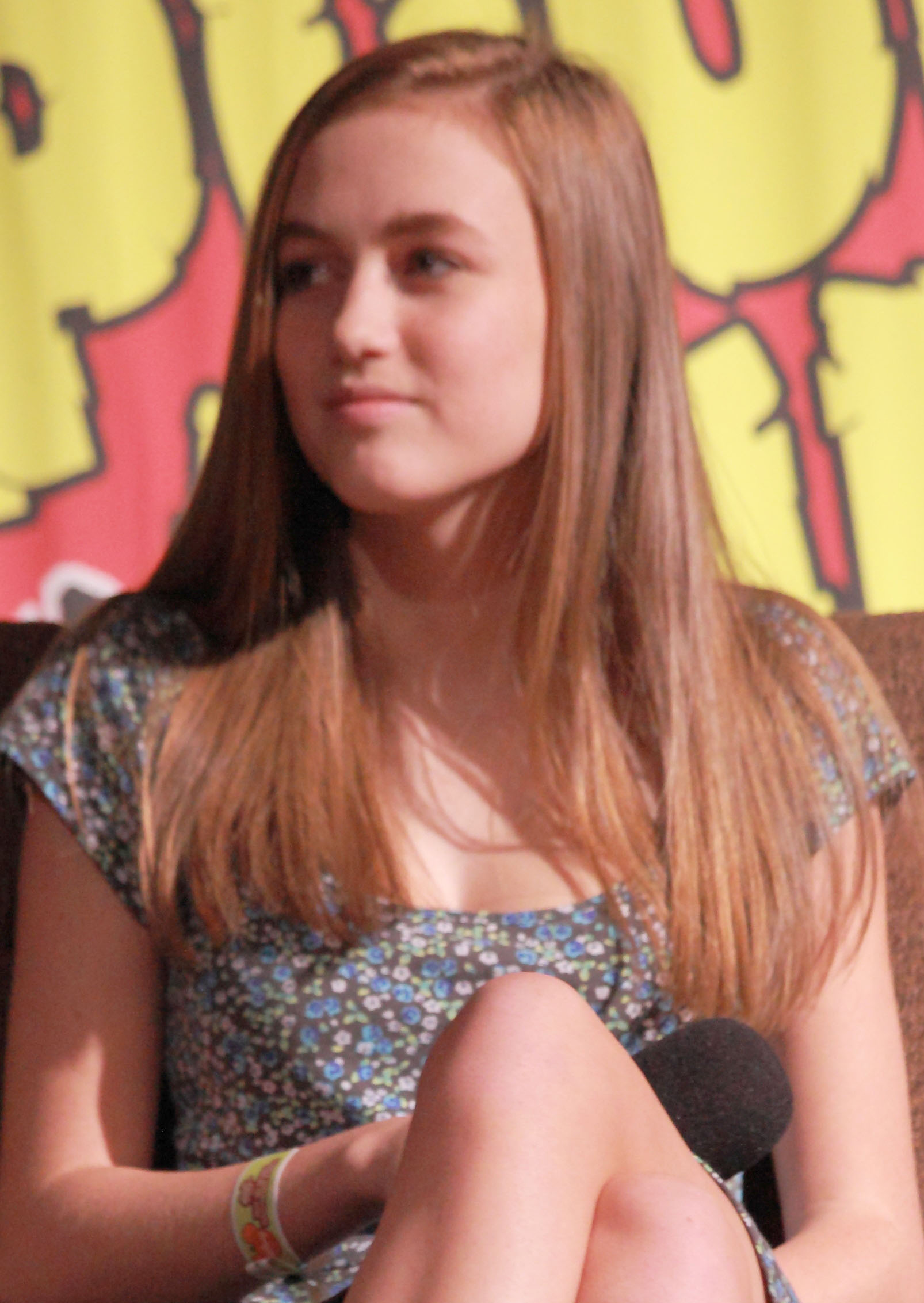
This episode marks the departure of Sophia Peletier, portrayed by Madison Lintz.

Oh yeah, that was her in makeup. That's the consolation prize to finding out that you're dying on the show. It's never fun for an actor to learn that they're being written out of the show and it's a hard thing to do. It's something that we never take lightly. But, you know, you've got to kill characters! On this show, you at least get the benefit of getting up and coming back as a zombie. That hopefully makes it a little less uncool.

— Robert Kirkman

"Pretty Much Dead Already" was written by Scott M. Gimple and directed by Michelle MacLaren. It features recurring appearances from Lauren Cohan, Scott Wilson, IronE Singleton, Madison Lintz, Emily Kinney, Jane McNeill, James Allen McCune, and Amber Chaney. Following the initial broadcast of the previous installment, "Secrets", writer Robert Kirkman teased the following episode "Pretty Much Dead Already". He stated: "There's a lot of big stuff out there that we will be wrapping up to a certain extent. In the writers' room we were fully aware that we were coming up on this hiatus, so we definitely wrote to it. I think people are going to be a little shocked."

The death of Sophia Peletier is a major incident in "Pretty Much Dead Already", largely affecting the themes of the episode. After the group has shot the walkers housed in Hershel Greene's barn, Sophia appears from the barn as a walker, much to the groups' dismay. A disturbed and distraught Rick Grimes pulls out his weapon and makes the decision to shoot her. Despite being initially surprised about her character's being killed off, Madison Lintz concluded that she understood its aftermath for the show. Lintz affirmed that portraying a walker was a welcoming experience for her, and stated that she was "going to look back on and say that was amazing." Robert Kirkman felt that killing Sophia would add more dimension to the show, as well as add more flexibility to its storyline progression. "When a good idea comes up, you have to go with it," he articulated. "Sophia is a character who is still alive in the comic book series and who has contributed quite a bit to the overall narrative and informed a lot of story lines for a lot of different characters. Having Carol [...] survive her daughter as opposed to the other way around as it is in the comics is going to lead to interesting but different stories." Although Kirkman was not on set during production of the sequence, Gimple retrieved shell casings from the blanks that were fired on set. Referred to as "Barnageddon" by the writers, Kirkman asserted that he emphasized unpredictability while creating the scene.

It's good to know people didn't see it coming. That's a big concern when you have this kind of story line and you are leading to that kind of reveal. You don't want people to be expecting it, especially in the Walking Dead. I pride myself in the fact that, when you pick up an issue of the comic, you don't know what's going to happen at any time. So any time we can work that into the show and maintain that in a television environment, it's very exciting for me. I'm glad people are being caught off guard.

Other themes prevalent in the episode include Lori's pregnancy. After getting into a heated argument, Rick reveals to Shane about her pregnancy. Although he didn't question who the biological father was, Robert Kirkman felt that Rick was "smart enough to know that the kid's either his or Shane's and there may not be any way of ever finding out that definitively." He continued: "Bringing that up to his wife, who he loves, is only going to be painful for her. I think that's him being a good husband and him showing his tremendous leadership ability in that he can put his self aside for the betterment of someone else."

== Reception ==
=== Ratings ===
"Pretty Much Dead Already" was initially broadcast in November 27, 2011 in the United States on AMC. Upon airing, it garnered 6.62 million viewers and a 3.5 rating in the 18-49 demographic, according to Nielsen ratings. The episode became the highest-rated cable program of the day, obtaining significantly higher ratings than Kourtney and Kim Take New York on E! and Real Housewives of Atlanta on Bravo. "Pretty Much Dead Already" received the show's highest ratings since "Bloodletting", which obtained 6.7 million viewers and a 3.6 rating in the 18-49 demographic. In addition, the episode became the fourth highest-rated cable telecast of the week, and the highest-rated non sport cable telecast of the week dated November 27. Total viewership and ratings for the episode significantly increased from the preceding installment, "Secrets", which garnered 6.08 million viewers and a 3.1 rating amongst adults in the 18-49 demographic. In the United Kingdom, "Pretty Much Dead Already" received 666,000 viewers, subsequently becoming the most-watched cable program on FX of the week dated December 4.

=== Critical response ===
"Pretty Much Dead Already" tied up the immediate loose ends, and like Season 1's "TS-19", contained a noisy last five minutes. Your opinion on the episode depends on how engaged you were in the season so far. As soon as the barn doors opened, the events were well executed, albeit foreseeable

— Mark Maurer
The Star Ledger

"Pretty Much Dead Already" was critically acclaimed by television critics and is generally considered to be one of the best episodes of the series. Eric Goldman of IGN evaluated the episode as "completely depressing", and added that the dark nature made the series excel. Goldman ultimately gave the episode an eight out of ten, signifying a "great" rating. Aaron Rutkoff of The Wall Street Journal felt that the episode was the series' best installment. Writing for The Grand Rapids Press, John Serba opined that "Pretty Much Dead Already" was a delightful ending to the first portion of the season. Zack Handlen of The A.V. Club stated that prior to its ending, the episode was "the usual mix of pretty good and deeply irritating." Handlen lauded the character development in the installment; "The episode puts a lot of effort into heightening the tensions between Hershel and Rick's people, and while it's not exactly subtle, it makes enough sense to be effective. This is conflict that should've been building for a few episodes now, instead of arriving fully formed right before it explodes, but I'm willing to take what I can get." Concluding his review, he issued the episode an A− grade. Digital Spy's Morgan Jeffrey avouched that "Pretty Much Dead Already" was "excellent", and added that the tension "slowly ratchets up to an almost unbearable level." Some critics were divided with the episode. Time journalist Nate Rawlings felt that while the writers put a lot of substance into the characters, many of them are still underdeveloped. Gina McIntyre of Los Angeles Times felt that some parts of the episode lacked cohesion and direction.

The episode's concluding scene involving Sophia's death was cited as the episode highlight. Janet Turley of The Huffington Post asserted that the sequence was "fiction not afraid to provoke", while Goldman described it as an "absolutely horrific scenario". CNN's Henry Hanks opined that the sequence "left [them] with a final scene that we'll be talking about until then." New York's Starlee Kine asserted that it contained cinematic qualities, and felt that the scene was "satisfying, sad, and fun". She wrote: "It was everything you've ever wanted this show to be. Zombies plus no dialogue, such a winning combination! And how great was it that Sophia was dead instead of impossibly alive somewhere, holed up with Merle or Morgan or those warmhearted gang members in Atlanta. And because she was granted more screen time than she ever was when she was alive, we were finally able to care about the loss of her short, young life." Jen Chaney of The Washington Post echoed synonymous sentiments; "Really, the final moments of the last episode before the AMC series' December/January hiatus played like a fireworks finale on the Fourth of July, assuming your Fourth of July celebrations typically involve zombies and a pile of corpses." Rawlings concluded that it was the perfect resolution for what he called "television's slowest subplot". McIntyre felt that the concluding sequence was the most eventful moment of the episode, and stated that it was difficult to watch.

Ken Tucker of Entertainment Weekly affirmed that the scene reestablished The Walking Dead to full form, as well as redeemed the season's "general gutlessness thus far." HitFix's Alan Sepinwall reflected similar thoughts, and observed that it was effective enough to keep the viewers chattering until the succeeding episode. Handlen summated: "The Sophia reveal is a punch in the gut, because narrative fiction teaches us the longer someone stays missing, the better the chance they'll turn up alive; otherwise, where would the drama be? By using the little girl in this way, the show transforms what should've been anti-climax into a reinvention of an entire storyline. It's not enough to make the bad parts of the earlier episodes great, but it does show that the writers had more on their mind than stalling." Mark Maurer of The Star-Ledger felt that albeit predictable, the segment was "well executed". Josh Wigler of MTV said that the storyline ended in "a much darker way than anyone could have imagined."
