= Secrets (The Walking Dead) =

- The Walking Dead episode
- Glenn comes to the rescue as Maggie is attacked by a walker.
- Episode no.: Season 2 Episode 6
- Directed by: David Boyd
- Written by: Angela Kang
- Cinematography by: Rohn Schmidt
- Editing by: Hunter M. Via
- Original air date: November 20, 2011

Guest appearances
- IronE Singleton as Theodore "T-Dog" Douglas; Lauren Cohan as Maggie Greene; Emily Kinney as Beth Greene; Scott Wilson as Hershel Greene; Jane McNeill as Patricia; James Allen McCune as Jimmy

Episode chronology
← Previous "Chupacabra"	Next → "Pretty Much Dead Already"
- The Walking Dead season 2

"Secrets" is the sixth episode of the second season of the post-apocalyptic television series The Walking Dead. It originally aired on AMC in the United States on November 20, 2011. In this episode, Glenn (Steven Yeun) tells Dale Horvath (Jeffrey DeMunn) that Lori Grimes (Sarah Wayne Callies) is pregnant and there are numerous walkers in the Greene barn. Dale confronts Hershel Greene (Scott Wilson) about hoarding walkers in his barn. Meanwhile, Shane Walsh (Jon Bernthal) attempts to teach Andrea (Laurie Holden) how to use weapons and Lori agonizes over the decision to terminate her pregnancy or keep the baby.

The episode was written by Angela Kang and directed by David Boyd. "Secrets" touches on various themes, including abortion, romance, and confession. In preparation for filming, producers initially converted a vacant building in downtown Sharpsburg, Georgia into a temporary pharmacy in July 2011. Principal photography for the episode occurred a month later in August.

"Secrets" attained mostly positive reception from critics, who praised the character development and the storyline progression. The episode attracted criticism from political commentators, who denounced the show for its misleading perception of emergency contraception. Upon airing, "Secrets" garnered 6.08 million viewers and a 3.1 rating in the 18-49 demographic, according to Nielsen ratings. It became the second highest-rated cable program of the day, as well as the fourth most-viewed cable program of the week.

== Plot ==
After Glenn inadvertently discovers the presence of walkers in the Greene barn, Maggie begs him to keep it a secret. Dale quickly notices Glenn's nervousness, and when he talks privately to Glenn, Glenn blurts out about the walkers as well as his knowledge that Lori Grimes is pregnant. Dale confronts Hershel about the walkers. Hershel believes they are still people, including his wife and stepson, and can be cured, and refuses to kill them after Dale explains the danger.

Rick, Shane and T-Dog give gun training to Jimmy, Carl and the women on the farm. Shane takes Andrea aside to give her advanced training after seeing how good she is with a weapon, but she is unable to hit a moving target. Shane tries to encourage her to remember her dead sister, Amy, but this only causes Andrea to storm away. Meanwhile, Rick and Lori argue on what to do with Hershel's demand to leave the farm, now that Carl is healed.

Andrea and Shane then go off to town after Shane finds a lead on the missing Sophia, but find it overrun by walkers. They escape after Andrea rediscovers her shooting abilities, and the two subsequently begin an affair. Dale senses something amiss and warns Shane to stay away from Andrea, as well as his suspicion of what happened to Otis while he and Shane went searching for medical supplies, and his contempt for Rick. Shane denies the accusations and threatens to shoot Dale should he make any more.

Maggie and Glenn discuss the walker situation on the farm, with Maggie sharing the same attitude as her father Hershel. They go on another supply run at Lori's request, specifically looking for morning after pills. At the pharmacy, Maggie is attacked by a walker but Glenn intervenes and subdues it before it harms Maggie. Back on the farm, Maggie confronts Lori about being almost killed due to her request, and tells Glenn the rest of the group is using him as "walker bait". Glenn later tells Lori that she should tell Rick about her pregnancy soon. Lori contemplates the act of raising a child in this world, and decides to take the pills, but after a moment, runs away from their camp to immediately regurgitate them. Rick sees the pills and goes to find Lori, who admits she was in a relationship with Shane before Rick found them. Rick reveals he already knew about this.

== Production ==
That's the risk that you take with this kind of stuff. But I think that avoiding that in order to avoid any kind of controversy is weak storytelling. There's always going to be a controversy of some kind no matter what you do. People have opinions, and that's what makes them great. You can't write a story trying to avoid anything like that because the most mundane thing can [turn into] overblown Internet hysteria. You've just got to do what you do.

— Robert Kirkman

"Secrets" was directed by David Boyd and written by Angela Kang. It features recurring appearances from Lauren Cohan, Scott Wilson, IronE Singleton, Emily Kinney, Jane McNeill, and James Allen McCune. Principal photography for the episode commenced in downtown Sharpsburg, Georgia, in August 2011. Preparation for filming began in July 2011, when producers renovated an empty building into a temporary drug store. Herb Bridges, who owned the building at the time, was initially contacted by producers of the series' in January 2011, and again four months later in May. Bridges informed them that the space would be rented by a woman who would open a children's store there; however, she had not moved into the space yet.

The topic of abortion is a prominent theme in "Secrets". After discovering that she is pregnant, Lori asks Glenn to retrieve with emergency contraception pills from the pharmacy. Upon returning, an infuriated Maggie shoves Lori’s pills at her. Dale gently confronts her about her pregnancy when he sees that she becomes nauseated at the smell of cooking meat, and Lori explains that Rick is the biological father of the child. Writer Robert Kirkman opined that such assertions were "wishful thinking". "She was with those two men very close to each other. There was not a large span of time between her time with Shane and then Rick's return and her time with Rick. It's definitely up in the air and it’s not like there's a lot of paternity tests floating around out there." Kirkman felt that he had to responsibly approach controversial issues from a neutral standpoint and insisted that abortion should warrant discussion, considering the circumstances. He stated: "As far as the abortion stuff goes, it’s really just a matter of being realistic. These are the kinds of issues that people deal with in real life and in this situation I think that that is the kind of thought process that Lori Grimes would be going through."

In the concluding sequence of the episode, Lori admits to Rick that she had an affair with Shane in the belief that her husband was dead. Kirkman stated that the writers wanted to "wrap up to a certain extent", and opined that such revelations would add more tension between the characters.

It was something we wanted to wrap up to a certain extent. It's a disservice to Rick's character to make him look like he's completely clueless. But this isn't really a resolution per se. It makes things a little bit more tense, moving into this next episode. Seeing Rick interact with Shane will have an extra level of tension because now the audience has one up on Shane as opposed to one up on Rick. It’s going to be fun waiting for the other shoe to drop, when Rick may or may not confront Shane with this information.

In an interview with MTV News, Bernthal stated that Walsh was suffering from the "loneliness you feel when you're right there with them and you can't be with them in the way you want." Bernthal applauded the writers for such changes, and felt that the storyline never devitalized. "The people that Shane loved more than anyone else in the world before the apocalypse are still very much alive and still very much with him, but he'll never be with them in the way he wants to and the way he once was. Every relationship—Shane/Carl, Shane/Lori and Shane/Rick—it's tainted and fractured. When you suffer from that kind of loneliness, it brings out the worst in you."

== Reception ==
=== Ratings ===
"Secrets" initially aired in the United States on November 20, 2011 on AMC. Upon airing, the episode acquired 6.08 million viewers and attained a 3.1 rating in the 18-49 demographic, according to Nielsen ratings. It was the second highest-rated cable program of the day, having been beaten by a stock car racing event as part of the 2011 NASCAR Sprint Cup Series. "Secrets" became the fourth most-watched program of the week, as well as the highest-rated non-sports cable program of the week. Total viewership and ratings slightly declined from the previous episode, "Chupacabra", which was viewed by 6.12 million viewers and garnered a 3.2 rating in the 18-49 demographic. In the United Kingdom, the episode received 561,000 viewers and became the highest-rated television program on FX for the week dated November 27.

=== Critical response ===
"Secrets" was well received by television critics. Gina McIntyre of the Los Angeles Times concluded that the episode "dispensed with almost every hidden truth the survivors have been keeping from one another." Scott Meslow of The Atlantic described the episode as one focused on love and relationships. IGN's Eric Goldman evaluated the episode as "satisfying", and added that its character development was executed strongly. Ultimately, he issued "Secrets" an eight out of ten, signifying a "great" rating. Aaron Rutkoff of The Wall Street Journal echoed synonymous sentiments: "Viewers tuning in each week in the hope of watching pulse-quickening battles between overmatched humans and armies of the undead are sure to be frustrated. Things are static in an action sense, but the show's admirably nuanced characters are changing and reacting to the world in surprising and complicated ways." Writing for Cinema Blend, Nick Venable stated that the characters became more distinguishable.

Not all reviewers were as enthusiastic about "Secrets" as the general consensus. Starlee Kine of New York stated that despite having high hopes in the beginning of "Secrets", the episode overall failed to meet her expectations. The A.V. Club's Zach Halden opined that despite containing solid scenes, the episode harbored several issues. Halden cited the pace of the storyline progression and the execution of the character development as weaknesses. Concluding his review, he gave the episode a B grade. Although Andrew Conrad of The Baltimore Sun touted the character development, he pointed out that there was very little action. The Portland Mercury's Steven Humphrey panned the episode, describing it as "boring".

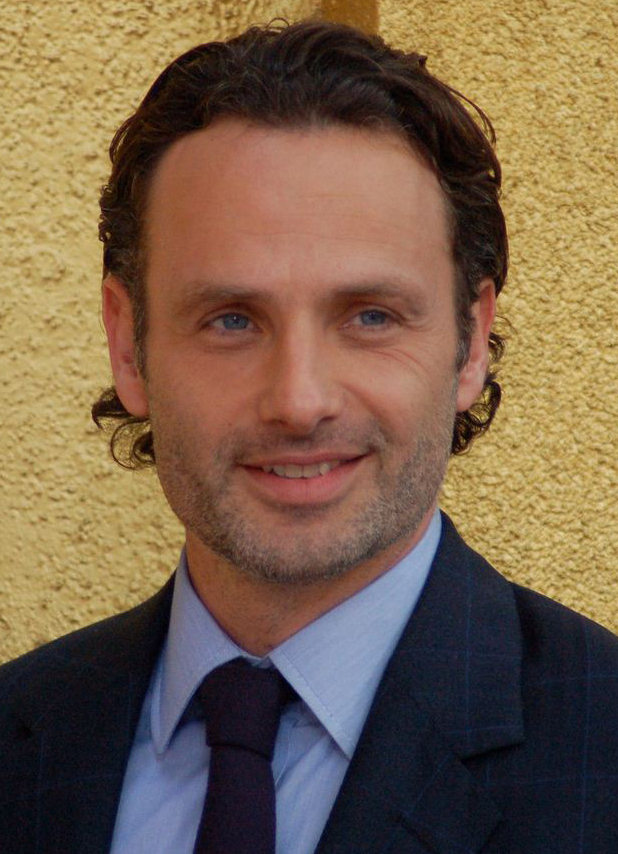
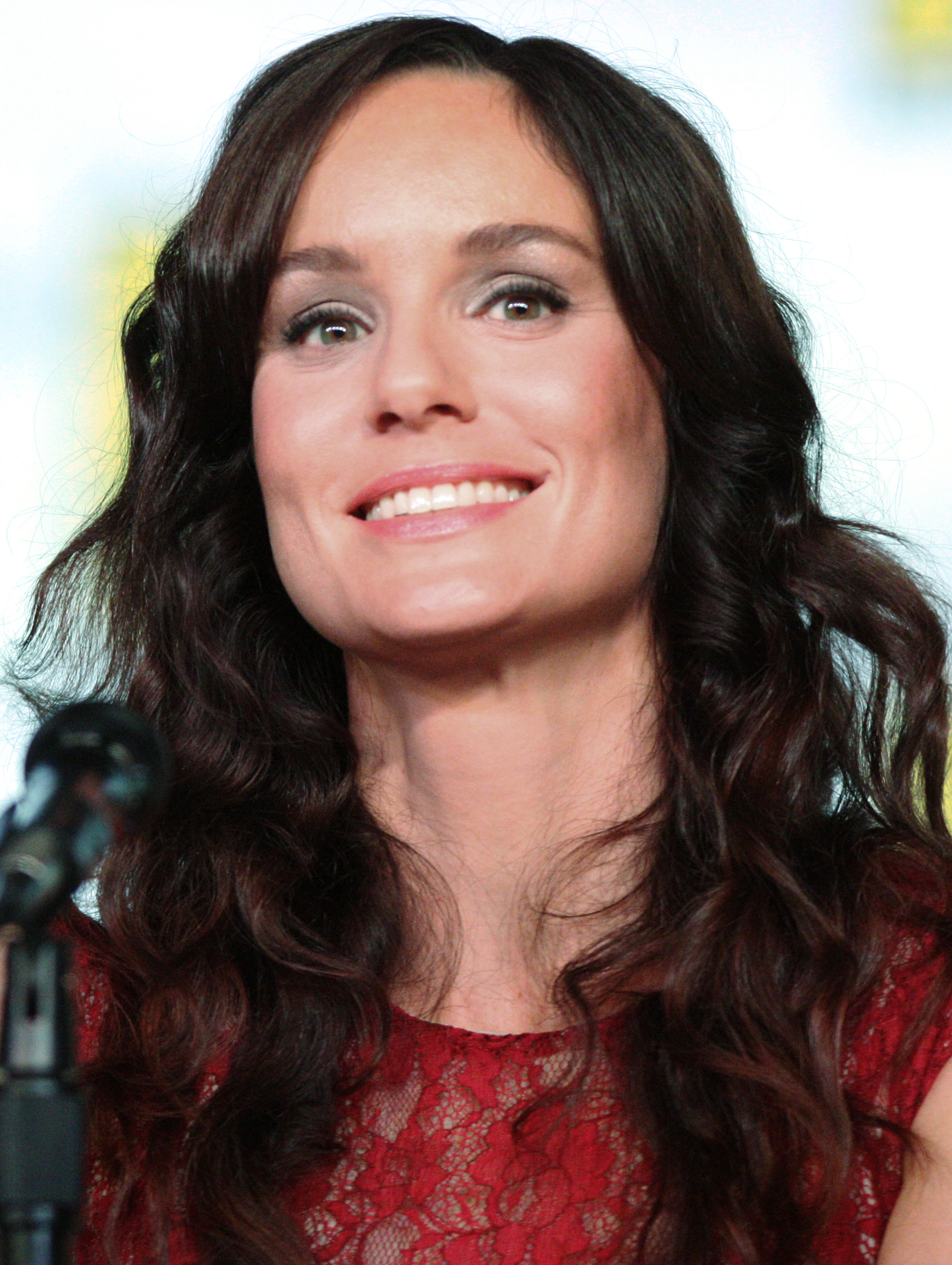
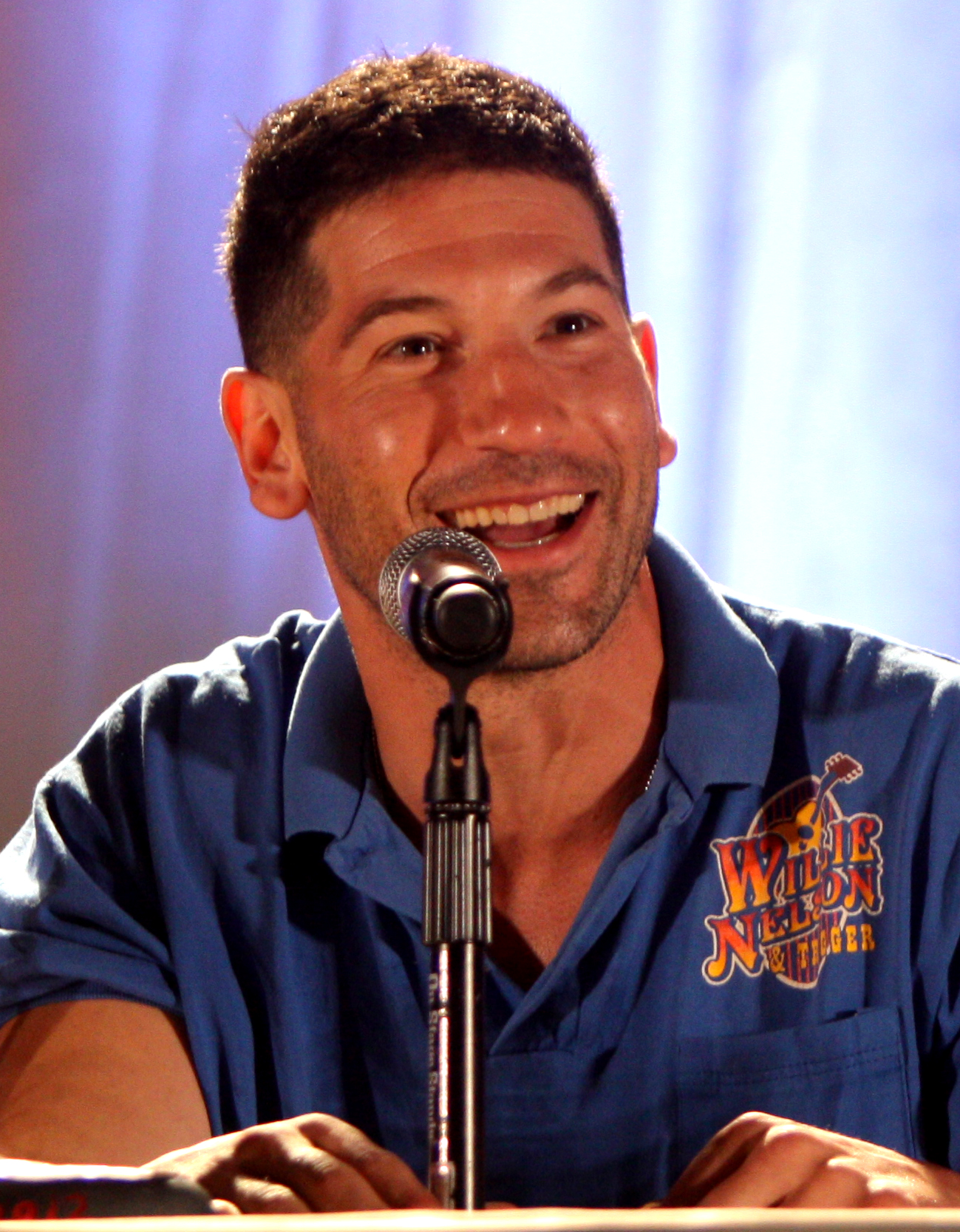
Critics commended the love triangle involving, Rick (Andrew Lincoln, left) Lori (Sarah Wayne Callies, center), and Shane (Jon Bernthal, right).

The opening segment of "Secrets" was widely lauded by critics. Halden thought that it was a great start to the episode, and Kine felt that the show returned to form following the sequence. She wrote: "This week's opening functioned like an adrenaline shot to my weary heart. At the sight of all those undead relatives in the barn, I, too, briefly, came to life."

Critics were polarized with the characters' reaction to Lori opting for an abortion. Halden criticized the character's opposing views on the matter, and stated that their reasonings were invalid. Halden wrote. "I'm not even sure it would be possible for her to abort the pregnancy at this point, but the show's working on the assumption that having a child in a world where death literally lurks around every corner is an unequivocal good. The only person who’s been anti-pregnancy is Lori, and the show hasn't managed to cast her in a very good light, so it’s not like her arguments hold much water—which is also ridiculous, because ultimately, her opinion is the only one that matters." HitFix writer Alan Sepinwall reflected similar thoughts, and stated that Rick's arguments against Lori's attempts were obsolete.

The love triangle involving Lori, Rick, and Shane was cited as an episode highlight. Meslow felt that the interactions between Lori and Rick possessed "as much rawness and honesty as could be hoped for." Kine criticized the emotion during the interactions between Shane and Rick, and summated that it was a "standard Walking Dead attempt at trying to convince us that Grimes and Shane are friends by way of showing us their casual, good-old-boy-tinged banter." Ritkoff expressed that the episode's conclusion was a rational and level-headed resolution to the storyline; "Whatever jealousy he might feel, it would have been absurd for Rick to punish the woman he loves most in the world for post-apocalyptic infidelity under these circumstances." Sepinwall commended Rick's reaction to Lori's confessions, and Goldman felt that their interaction was well acted and perfectly scripted. Venable appraised the segment as "very engaging", and applauded Lincoln's performance. He wrote, "Andrew Lincoln delivered these lines of pitiable understanding as well as anyone could." CNN's Henry Hanks opined: "If you thought Rick and Shane had blow-ups before, you ain't seen nothing yet."

Critics applauded the growing relationship between Andrea and Shane, as well as Dale's confrontation with Shane. Despite describing them as an "unlikely pairing", Meslow asserted that it was superior to the storyline between Andrea and Dale. "There's something to be said for the occasional post-apocalyptic tryst, which allows two characters who've experienced almost nothing but misery to have, even for a moment, something that resembles joy," he articulated. Meslow retorted that it was wise to underplay the tryst between Shane and Andrea, which he predicted would not lead to anything serious. Venable wrote: " Dale’s lack of personality traits, beyond being the wise sage who gets in everyone’s business, makes him an unpredictable foe in my book, and could be as interesting as Shane’s violent selfishness." Morgan Jeffrey of Digital Spy avouched that Shane continued to be an interesting character; "Just as we were beginning to like him again, he murdered Otis in cold blood. And it seems like his downward spiral is set to continue—he's threatening poor Dale and embarking on an ill-advised affair with Andrea."

The progressing relationship between Maggie Greene and Glenn was well received by critics. Nate Rawlings of Time asserted that their interactions carried the most emotional poignance. Rawlings opined: "She's forced to confront, perhaps for the first time, that these creatures are slobbering monsters. Before her attack, she yelled at Dale [sic] for calling them Walkers; to her they're mom, her brother, the neighbors. After her attack, her mind might be changed."

==== Abortion controversy ====
There is considerable confusion about the difference between medication abortion and emergency contraception, and it was distressing to see this misunderstanding further spread by a show like The Walking Dead. Aren't they supposed to have fact checkers to catch this kind of thing? Emergency contraception prevents pregnancy and is especially useful in cases of unanticipated sexual activity, contraceptive failure, or sexual assault.

— Danielle Aronson, ACLU

"Secrets" attracted criticism from political commentators for its "potentially misleading perception" of emergency contraception. Shawn Rhea of Planned Parenthood cited that the morning-after pills do not induce abortion, as the episode implies. Erin Gloria Ryan of Jezebel wrote: "Lori would have been better off sending the men off to loot a shop that sells herbal remedies and brewing herself some pennyroyal tea or climbing a tree and jumping out in hopes that the impact would end the pregnancy. Both of those things are dangerous and might not work, but they're about as effective as OD'ing on levonorgestrel." Ryan prescribed that actual abortion pills are administered by medical professionals and are not available at pharmacies. Danielle Aronson of ACLU summated that the effectiveness of terminating a pregnancy with emergency contraception would be equivalent to "cutting a zombie's finger off to kill it." Similarly, Slate's Amanda Marcotte opined: "The problem with this storyline, outside the tedious fear of getting letters from irate anti-choicers that dictates TV's near-absolute approach to unintended pregnancy, is simple: Morning-after pills are not abortion." Marcotte asserted that abortion pills, commonly RU-486, were only provided by medical personnel. "Morning-after pills are contraception, and they work by stifling ovulation before any sperm can make their way toward the Fallopian tubes."

This prompted showrunner Glen Mazzara to respond to such criticism. In his interview with The Daily Beast, he stated: "The producers and writers of The Walking Dead are fully aware that the morning-after pill would not induce an abortion or miscarriage, we exercised our artistic creative license to explore a storyline with one of our characters, not to make any pro-life or pro-choice political statement. We sincerely hope that people are not turning to the fictional world of The Walking Dead for accurate medical information." The episode itself does not, in fact, claim the morning after pills will work, as Glenn questions Lori over that fact, to which she replies that she does not know.
