= Hershel Greene =

Fictional character from The Walking Dead

- The Walking Dead character
- From left to right: Hershel in the comic book series, television series (portrayed by Scott Wilson) and video game series
- First appearance: Comic: "Issue #10" (2004); Television: "Bloodletting" (2011); Video game: "A New Day" (2012)
- Last appearance: Comic: "Issue #48" (2008); Television: "What Comes After" (2018); Video game: "A New Day" (2012)
- Created by: Robert Kirkman; Charlie Adlard
- Adapted by: Glen Mazzara (The Walking Dead)
- Portrayed by: Scott Wilson
- Voiced by: Chuck Kourouklis (video game)

In-universe information
- Occupation: Comic: Farmer; Veterinarian; Group medic Television: Head of the Prison Council
- Family: Comic: Sophia Peletier (adoptive granddaughter); Carl Grimes (adoptive grandson-in-law); Andrea Grimes (adoptive great-granddaughter); Television: Arnold Greene (nephew); Glenn Rhee (son-in-law); Hershel Rhee (grandson); Nelly (pet)
- Spouses: Comic: Unnamed woman (wife); Television: Josephine Greene (first wife); Annette Greene (second wife)
- Children: Comic: Shawn Greene (son by unnamed wife); Lacey Greene (daughter by unnamed wife); Arnold Greene (son by unnamed wife); Maggie Greene (daughter by unnamed wife); Billy Greene (son by unnamed wife); Rachel Greene (daughter by unnamed wife); Susie Greene (daughter by unnamed wife); Television: Maggie Greene (daughter by Josephine); Beth Greene (daughter by Annette); Shawn Greene (stepson by Annette)

Hershel Greene is a fictional character in The Walking Dead whose role is depicted in the comic book, television series as portrayed by Scott Wilson and the game series. He is the widowed owner of a farm in Georgia and has previous experience in the veterinary fields. A devout Christian, with uncompromising morals and a stubborn attitude, Hershel remains fiercely protective of his large family, despite his many losses. In both the comics and television series, he is initially introduced saving the life of Carl Grimes, the son of Rick Grimes, after Carl is shot by one of Hershel's neighbors, Otis, and becomes the moral center of the group.

In the comic book series, Hershel is a farmer who initially exhibits a cold and cantankerous demeanor, before opening up to Rick Grimes and his fellow survivors, proving to be a gentle man at heart. He becomes a deeply religious man after the loss of his wife. He spreads hope and reassurance to his fellow survivors, in particular, his second-born daughter, Maggie Greene and his youngest son, Billy Greene.

Similarly in the television series, Hershel begins as a veterinarian and farmer, and soon advises Rick and proves himself to be a skilled diplomat, often coercing his fellow survivors to make the right choices suited for them. He deeply cares for and tends to his surviving daughters, Maggie and Beth Greene. In both mediums, he initially disapproves of Maggie's relationship with Glenn, but over time Hershel comes to accept him and Glenn comes to view Hershel as a father figure. Hershel even gives Glenn his treasured pocket watch as he offers Glenn his blessing to marry Maggie. Unlike the comic book series, Hershel takes on a much more prominent role, as well as having a significantly smaller family (which includes seven children in the comics). His family originates from Ireland in both mediums.

The character of Hershel Greene and Scott Wilson's portrayal has garnered positive reviews from critics and fans alike. He is often cited as one of the television series' best characters, particularly due to his significant impact on the storyline and moral nature. Hershel Greene was Wilson's final acting role before his death on October 6, 2018.

== Appearances ==
=== Comic book series ===
Hershel as depicted in the comic book series

Hershel is displayed as a middle-aged man of Irish descent who grew up on his family's farm where he developed a love for animals. As an adult, he held a veterinary business with his wife, which ended up collapsing once she died. Distraught over the loss and unable to do much (while at the same time forcing himself to develop a more religious point of view), he chose to fulfill his father's dying wish by moving himself and his seven children back to the farm and tending to the livestock, as well as being able to return to the old and simplistic form of life that he missed while he was living in the city. He struggled with the family finances, especially when it came to the expenses from college for some of his older children. Hershel was sheltered from the reality of the outside world when the apocalypse began and confused about what exactly was happening; when his son Shawn was bitten, Hershel was unable to handle the thought of killing him and desperately clung to the belief that zombies were merely sick humans who could return to normal with a cure. He resorted to locking them up inside his barn whenever they wandered onto the property.

When the Atlanta band takes refuge at the farm after one of their own, Carl, is shot, he welcomes them with open arms. However, he gradually grows frustrated with them; this comes to a head when the barn bursts open and the zombies kill two of his children. He is distraught over their deaths and blames the survivors for what happened. After he discovers his daughter, Maggie, sleeping with Glenn, and sees that the other members of the group refuse to leave, he puts a gun to Rick's head and thus forces them out (though afterwards, he is ashamed and scared of the fact that he was on the verge of taking an innocent life).

As the farm becomes increasingly unsafe, he and the rest of his people make the decision to join the Atlanta band at a safe and secure semi-abandoned prison where they next take shelter.

Hershel gradually makes amends with his fellow survivors and accepts Maggie's relationship with Glenn. His medical experience as well as his farm-work knowledge come in handy for the survivors several times. His two youngest daughters die at the hands of a deranged prisoner, adding to his family's death toll. Now more than ever, he only lives for the protection and survival of his two remaining children. After marrying Maggie and Glenn, and knowing Glenn will take care of her for as long as he lives, he sees closure with that child and narrows his focus down to his youngest son Billy. He engages fiercely in the battle against the Governor and the Woodbury citizens but ultimately gives up on life after his son Billy is killed while they are fleeing the prison.

In his last moments, he turned down the chance to escape with Rick and the others and remained hovering over his dead son's body until he caught the attention of the Governor. His tearful last words were, "Dear God, please kill me", before being shot in the head by the Governor.

=== Television series ===
Hershel was described as being raised by an abusive, alcoholic father, which resulted in him running away from the farmhouse at 15 years old and later not being at his father's deathbed. During his time away from the area, he became a veterinarian. At some point, he married a woman named Josephine, and settled back on the farm. Within the first few years of their marriage, he descended into alcoholism; however, he managed to give up the habit once Maggie was born. When Maggie was older, Josephine died, and Hershel eventually married another woman named Annette (who had a son of her own from a previous marriage named Shawn) and had a daughter with her whom they named Beth. At some point during Maggie's childhood he employed Otis and Patrica as farmhands. Sometime after the apocalypse began, he lost Annette and Shawn to the hordes of zombies. He and the rest of his group remained unaware of the reality of the outside world and strongly believed that there could be a cure. As a result of this mistaken belief, Hershel kept a large group of walkers, mostly family and friends, locked in a nearby barn. Hershel subsequently barricaded his family and surviving friends, consisting of Maggie, Beth, Otis, Patrica and Beth's boyfriend Jimmy within the house.

==== Season 2 ====
Hershel and his family are introduced in the episode "Bloodletting", after Otis accidentally shoots Carl while hunting. Rick and Shane follow Otis back to Hershel's farm. Hershel tends to the wound with what he has available, but sends Otis and Shane to retrieve supplies for performing a surgery to remove the bullet. During this, Shane allows Otis to be taken by the walkers to manage his own escape, but lies about Otis' fate when he returns to the group. Hershel successfully removes the bullet. Hershel is wary of Rick's group but allows them to move onto a field distant from his home while Carl recovers and the group looks for Carol's missing daughter, Sophia, warning them to stay away from the barn.

Hershel observes Glenn flirting with his daughter Maggie, and warns Glenn to stay away from her. Despite this, the two find ways to see each other, and Glenn inadvertently suggests meeting Maggie in the barn, where he discovers it is full of walkers ("Chupacabra"). Glenn tells the others, and Dale tries to talk privately with Hershel about the walkers; Hershel states they are his friends and family including his wife, and he believes they can be cured ("Secrets"). As the group starts to feel unsafe, this turns into a large argument between Hershel and Rick; to end the stalemate, Shane purposely bursts open the lock on the barns, allowing the walkers to escape, which the group methodically dispatch. One last walker emerges: that of Sophia. Carol breaks down into tears as Sophia is subdued, and Hershel storms off ("Pretty Much Dead Already").

Hershel initially demands Rick's group to leave, as Carl is now healthy enough to move, but when Rick goes to plead forgiveness, Hershel has gone missing. Rick and Glenn search for him and find him at a bar, having reverted to his alcoholism. Hershel admits Rick was right and that there is no cure, and accepts the need to protect his daughters ("Nebraska"). As they prepare to return to the farm, they are assaulted by another group, leading to a shootout that draws a horde of walkers. In their escape, the surviving member of the other group Randall gets his leg impaled on a fence, and Rick and Hershel help rescue him. They quickly realize they must keep the location of the farm a secret should Randall recover and return to his own group ("Triggerfinger"). What to do with Randall becomes a point of contention between Rick and Shane, the latter wanting to just kill him. Hershel thanks Glenn for his supportiveness, and grants his permission for him to continue to see Maggie, gifting him his pocketwatch ("Judge, Jury, Executioner"), and later allows Rick's group to stay at the farm proper ("Better Angels").

Shane eventually sneaks Randall off and kills him, which Rick later discovers. He accosts Shane one night at gunpoint, and when Shane shows no remorse, Rick kills him, and Carl protects Rick by firing on Shane's re-animated body. The gunshots lure a horde that overwhelm Hershel's farm, and while Hershel fights to protect his homestead, the battle becomes impossible, and he, Maggie, and Beth join with Rick's group as they flee the burning house and farm ("Beside the Dying Fire").

==== Season 3 ====
Eight months after fleeing Hershel's farm, Rick's group locates a nearly-intact prison that shows promise as permanent shelter. However, many walkers still wander inside, and the group splits up to deal with them. Hershel is part of Rick's team when he is bitten by a walker on the ankle, and they race him to a safe area to amputate his foot ("Seed"). Hershel loses consciousness and they race him back to the main area to treat Hershel's leg while watching for any signs of turning ("Sick"). Hershel recovers, and eventually is able to walk with a set of crutches, but when he takes his first steps outside, the group is attacked by more walkers. During the fight, Rick loses his wife Lori while she gives birth to their daughter Judith, and falls into a fugue state ("Killer Within"). Hershel, along with Glenn and Daryl, take over making decisions for the group, as well as being a father figure for Carl.

The prison group ends becoming entangled with The Governor who runs the nearby Woodbury community. Hershel helps Rick overcome his depression to take action against the Governor, who has set his eyes on taking over the prison ("I Ain't a Judas"). Hershel participates in negotiations with the Governor alongside Rick and Daryl ("Arrow on the Doorpost"). Rick wants to turn over Michonne, whom they have taken in into the prison group, to the Governor as she had stabbed one of his eyes, but Hershel refused to be a part of that trade ("This Sorrowful Life"). Ultimately, Rick's group is forced to fight the Governor and his men. Hershel witnesses Carl killing a teenaged boy that had willingly surrendered during the battle, and later talks to Rick about it, fearing Rick's violent methods have rubbed off onto Carl. ("Welcome to the Tombs")

During these events, Hershel gives Glenn his permission to marry Maggie ("This Sorrowful Life").

==== Season 4 ====
Six months after defeating the Governor, Hershel is part of the ruling council of the prison group along with Glenn, Carol, Daryl, and Sasha, and has become closer to Rick, who has backed off the leadership role and trying to help raise livestock for the group ("30 Days Without an Accident"). A lethal illness breaks out in the prison and those infected are isolated from the others ("Infected"). Hershel and Carl find herbs outside the prison that Hershel think can help stop the infection, and convinces Rick and Maggie to go to the infected cell block to help. One of the patients coughs blood on Hershel's face, and he considers himself infected and remains in the quarantine ("Isolation"). The infection leads to one death, the person's body reanimating and biting another in the block, starting a chain reaction. Hershel is cornered by some of the reanimated patients before Maggie breaks into the block and helps him to escape ("Internment").

Eventually the threat of the illness and reanimation is stopped. Hershel gives Glenn his approval to marry Maggie. Later, Hershel helps Michonne with taking the corpses out of the prison to bury far away. They are soon found by the Governor, who has taken over a band of raiders led by his former allies, and the two are taken into custody. Hershel tries to convince the Governor they could live together in peace in the prison, but the Governor is far too set on revenge to consider this option. The Governor brings his forces to the gates of the prison and demands Rick's group leave the prison, holding Michonne's katana at Hershel's neck. Rick attempts to reason with the Governor, but he had already had his mind set, and partially decapitates Hershel. A massive firefight breaks out, and Hershel attempts to crawl to safety, but the Governor finds him and finishes decapitating him ("Too Far Gone"). Rick's group eventually repels the Governor, and in the aftermath, Michonne finds Hershel's reanimated head and finishes him off remorsefully.

Hershel appears in flashbacks in the season finale "A" as he helps convince Rick to pull away from violence, and spend time with his family.

==== Season 9 ====
Hershel appears in the ninth-season episode "What Comes After" as one of Rick's hallucinations as he makes his way, badly wounded, back to the Alexandria compound. Wilson's performance in this episode was his last onscreen appearance; he died on October 6, 2018, shortly after the episode was filmed, of leukemia.

==== Dead City ====
Hershel appears in a flashback in the third season episode "Emigrants." Watching her son, Hershel's namesake, treating patients causes Maggie to remember treating Glenn with her father in "Internment." Maggie later tells her son that he has a lot of Hershel's goodness in him. Maggie gives her father's pocket watch to young Hershel, telling the boy that it belonged to his grandfather and great-grandfather before him.

In the alternate reality in "Genesis," it's mentioned that Hershel has died relatively recently. Maggie's stepmother Annette and her brother Shawn have also died within the last few years.

=== Video games ===
The Telltale Games video game The Walking Dead takes place in the comic's storyline. Hershel and his son Shawn have taken in survivors of the zombie apocalypse, including the main player-character group of Lee Everett, Clementine, and others, though Hershel is worrisome about their presence. Hershel has long discussions with Lee, trying to work out his motives and trustworthiness. In exchange for shelter, Hershel asks the survivors to help Shawn with fortifying the farm's fences to keep walkers out. However, during these fortifications, Shawn is attacked by walkers and Lee and Kenny have the choice of whether to try to help Shawn or Kenny's young son Duck. Either way, Shawn dies, and Hershel kicks them off of the farm, although he expresses gratitude if they had attempted to save his son.

== Development and reception ==
Scott Wilson was officially announced as being cast in June 2011, along with co-stars Lauren Cohan and Pruitt Taylor Vince.

On Talking Dead, it was revealed that Hershel was initially scripted to be killed by Randall in the episode "Better Angels" during Randall's escape. However, the producers decided to allow the character to live so that they could explore the dramatic potential of losing his farm in "Beside the Dying Fire" and Season 3.

Noel Murray of Rolling Stone ranked Hershel Greene 8th in a list of 30 best Walking Dead characters, saying, "Around the same time that Dale died, Rick's bunch picked up a new voice of reason in the form of Hershel Greene, a gentleman farmer and veterinarian who initially stubbornly resisted the reality of the zombie apocalypse. Once the truth of his and his daughter Maggie's situation sunk in, he became a wizened pragmatist, cutting through the emotions of any moment to find compromises and options that others couldn't see."
