= Maggie Greene =

- The Walking Dead character
- Maggie, as portrayed by Lauren Cohan in the television series (left) and in the comic book series (right).
- First appearance: Comic: "Issue #10" (2004); Television: "Bloodletting" (2011)
- Last appearance: Comic: "Issue #193" (2019)
- Created by: Robert Kirkman; Charlie Adlard
- Adapted by: Glen Mazzara (The Walking Dead)
- Portrayed by: Lauren Cohan

In-universe information
- Nicknames: Television: The Widow
- Occupation: Farm Hand; College Student; Leader of the Hilltop Colony; Co-Leader of the Militia; Comic: Teacher for the Alexandria Safe-Zone; President of the Commonwealth; Television: Supply Runner for the prison Govern Assistant for the Alexandria Safe-Zone
- Family: Hershel Greene (father); Comic: Lacey Greene (sister); Shawn Greene (brother); Arnold Greene (brother); Billy Greene (brother); Rachel Greene (sister); Susie Greene (sister); Andrea Grimes (adoptive granddaughter); Television: Josephine Greene (mother); Annette Greene (step-mother); Shawn Greene (step-brother); Beth Greene (half-sister); Arnold Greene (cousin)
- Spouse: Glenn Rhee (Boyfriend later husband)
- Significant others: Comic: Dante
- Children: Television: Hershel Rhee (son); Comic: Sophia (adopted daughter); Carl Grimes (adoptive son-in-law)

Maggie Greene (later Maggie Rhee in the television series) is a fictional character from the comic book series The Walking Dead, portrayed by Lauren Cohan in the television adaptation of the same name.

In the comic book series, Maggie becomes the surrogate mother to Sophia following the suicide of the girl's mother, Carol. Maggie is initially insecure and depressed, attempting suicide at one point after her entire family is killed. Over time, she hardens and becomes independent. Maggie later becomes involved with the war against the Saviors, during which she encourages the people to follow Rick Grimes instead of Gregory and Negan. The people of The Hilltop listen to her and she becomes their de facto leader. After the war, Maggie has a son named after her father, Hershel. She remains fiercely protective of her children, as well as Carl Grimes, while being at odds with her predecessor, Gregory. Many people question her leadership due to her higher concern for her inner group, but there are some who idolize her, including Dante, who is shown to have feelings for her.

In the television series, Maggie does not share the insecurities of her comic book counterpart, and is more independent from the start. Initially, Maggie is inexperienced and ignorant of the apocalypse, being largely sheltered at the Greene family farm, but once Rick's group arrives, she quickly grows into a fierce and skilled fighter, becoming proficient with weapons and participating in supply runs for the group. Maggie forms a casual relationship with Glenn after becoming aware of his crush on her but insists it is purely a temporary arrangement. She later realizes that she has fallen in love with him, and they eventually marry. Maggie assumes the same leadership role of the Hilltop as she does in the comics, as well as her conflict with Gregory.

== Appearances ==
=== Comic book series ===
Maggie Greene on the cover of The Walking Dead comic book issue #132 "Happiness" with her two-year-old son, Hershel. Art by Charlie Adlard.

Maggie Greene is Hershel's second daughter, a rebellious and independent young woman, as well as a college dropout. Herschel barricaded her, her family, and her friends within the farm and kept them secluded, dependent solely on their farm's resources without knowing what was going on in the outside world.

She quickly takes a liking to Glenn when his group arrives at the farm, and the two begin to have a string of sexual encounters while her father is unaware of the relationship. Their relationship gradually becomes more serious and heartfelt each day, with the two often relying on one another. After a barn massacre that claims the lives of several of Maggie's siblings, Hershel ousts Glenn's group from the farm; however, Maggie convinces her father to let Glenn stay. As days go by following the group's departure, the Greene family notices the weakening defense structures of the premises. They decide to go to the prison afterwards. Maggie and Glenn continue their affair in the prison, constantly having sex in open spots.

Tragedy soon befalls Maggie, her brother Billy, and Hershel, when her two youngest sisters are brutally murdered by one of the remaining prison inmates, who is revealed to be a psychopathic sadist. The family remains close and in a deep state of depression for an extended amount of time, with Maggie caught in the middle of Billy and Hershel's strained relationship. She initially attempts to break off her relationship with Glenn, paranoid about the idea that the ongoing death pattern of her loved ones will soon reach Glenn. She decides at the last minute to continue to hold onto him after he convinces her that he will help her get through the deaths. As the inmate is prepared to be hanged out in the courtyard, Maggie shoots him to death in cold blood.

Because of her deepening interpersonal connection with and emotional reliance on Glenn, his brief absence from the prison becomes difficult to deal with and sends her into her father's arms. She subsequently marries Glenn in a ceremony performed by Hershel. Maggie yearns for a child, but Glenn and Hershel turn down the notion when they remind her of the cruel reality they are living in; despite this, however, she still holds out hope that she will be able to at some point when they have a more secure and better supplied environment.

When the Woodbury army descends onto the prison and begins their assaults, Tyreese leads Maggie, Glenn, and other members of the group into town, where they are ambushed by Woodbury and yet are able to make it out alive. The tension heightens when they return to the prison, and the second assault from the army (guaranteed to be more deadly) is looming. Hershel convinces Maggie to leave with Glenn and other members of the group until the war blows over, and those who left soon station themselves back at the farm. It is within this timeframe that Sophia, having faced the loss of her mother, begins to look up to Maggie as a surrogate parent, which fulfills Maggie's gap of not being able to conceive.

Upon reuniting with Rick and others, Maggie learns of Hershel and Billy's deaths during the assault; this sinks her into a deep depression, made even worse by the reminders of them around the farm. Glenn's attempts to console her prove effortless, and while journeying with the group led by Sergeant Abraham Ford to Washington D.C., she sneaks off into the woods one night and hangs herself. She is, however, rescued by Glenn and Abraham and successfully resuscitated.

She struggles to convince the group that she is fine and begins to feel like she has to hide herself emotionally from Glenn. Glenn assures her that she should have nothing to hide from him and reminds her of his love for her. His words prove to be insufficient however, as he takes notice during their stay at the Alexandria Safe Zone that she is becoming increasingly distant from him. Their situation becomes even further strained when Glenn opts to start going out on risky supply runs with fellow Alexandria citizen Heath. Maggie fears for his well-being and refuses to take the risk of losing him, seeing as how he's become her entire life since Hershel and Billy's deaths. After many strenuous events at the Alexandria Safe Zone, she and Glenn finally get some good news in the form of Doctor Cloyd telling her she is pregnant (much to the couple's surprise).

Fearing another attack after the Saviors' attempt to break into the community, Glenn convinces Maggie to leave the community with him and Sophia and head toward the Hilltop Colony, which he believes to be a much safer place. They are later ambushed by the Saviors while camping out during their trip, and she is forced to watch Glenn be viciously bludgeoned to death while crying her name.

Maggie is initially bitter and resentful toward Rick for not stepping up and protecting Glenn and furiously beats him before Carl stops her at gunpoint. She later is able to come to peace with Rick and decides to stay behind at the Hilltop with Sophia as per her and Glenn's original plan.

Later on, Maggie has regained stability and has continued focusing on her parental duties to Sophia while still mourning Glenn's loss. She befriends a woman in the community named Brianna who has also lost her family and makes regular visits to the community physician, who updates her on the baby's condition. She eventually ousts the Hilltop's leader, Gregory as a selfish coward, who pledges allegiance to Negan in order to avoid his own death, with no concern for the community itself. Maggie delivers a speech coercing the entire town to support Rick in his war against the Saviors, citing their precarious position and future as a reason to push forward against the Saviours. In result, the people follow Maggie in her actions to secure the town's future as she patrols the troops at the Hilltop Colony to save the people of Alexandria after the bombings that have destroyed the town. She relocates them to the Hilltop temporarily before it is re-constructed. Maggie successfully overthrows Gregory's position as leader and the allied forces manage to work together and capture Negan, who subsequently resides as a prisoner at the Alexandria Safe Zone.

Two years after the war is won, Maggie has had her son, whom she named Hershel after her father. She maintains her empowered leadership position, but her abilities are often challenged by the vain and self-absorbed previous leader, Gregory. Maggie remains protective of Sophia and Hershel (who is often cared for by Brianna in Maggie's leadership absence). After Sophia is brutally beaten almost to death by two bullies, and is saved by Carl Grimes, now working as a blacksmith apprentice and living at the Hilltop Colony with Maggie, she is forced to send him away. Maggie's leadership position comes at a struggle when the boys' families turn against her and follow along with Gregory's suggestion to kill her. In addition, a new threatening mysterious group of survivors known as "The Whisperers", a tribe of people disguised as roamers, have been capturing and murdering the town's supply runners and herd teams who come their way, as they successfully locate the Hilltop Colony, where one of their people, Lydia, has been interrogated by both Maggie and Jesus.

=== Television series ===
Maggie is introduced as Hershel (Scott Wilson)'s confident and athletic eldest daughter and the sister of Beth Greene (Emily Kinney). She has grown up on her father's farm all her life and suffered the loss of her mother at a young age. As the outbreak began, Hershel barricaded the Greene family and friends on the farm. It was during this time that her once-strong sense of faith began to dwindle, and she was left with doubts about what she believed in. She frequently made supply runs for everyone.

==== Season 2 ====
In the episode "Bloodletting", after Carl Grimes (Chandler Riggs) is accidentally shot, Maggie retrieves his mother, Lori (Sarah Wayne Callies) and brings her to the farm, where her father Hershel (Scott Wilson) treats the boy's wounds. In the episode "Save the Last One", Maggie strikes up a conversation with Glenn Rhee (Steven Yeun). In the episode "Cherokee Rose", they share a few tender moments before going off on a supply run together. They ultimately have sex inside the local pharmacy. In the episode "Cherokee Rose", Maggie tells Glenn that their tryst was a "one time thing". The two ultimately start a romance, however, and keep their relationship a secret, until Glenn finds the barn full of walkers across from her house.

In the episode "Secrets", Maggie begs Glenn not to tell the others about the barn, but he soon reveals this secret, leaving Maggie feeling frustrated and betrayed. However, her feelings for Glenn become stronger after he saves her from a walker during another supply run. In the mid-season finale "Pretty Much Dead Already", Glenn tells the rest of the group about the barn, and Shane eventually breaks the barn open, leading Glenn and the other survivors to kill all the walkers as they file out, as Maggie and her family watch in horror.

In the episode "Nebraska", Shane Walsh (Jon Bernthal) confronts Hershel about the barn, specifically accusing him of knowing that Carol Peletier's (Melissa McBride) daughter Sophia (Madison Lintz) whom the group were searching for was one of the walkers in the barn, Hershel and Maggie deny it. When Hershel disappears, she pleads with Glenn not to look for him.

In the episode "18 Miles Out", Maggie's sister, Beth (Emily Kinney) becomes suicidal and Andrea (Laurie Holden) encourages her to make a choice whether to take her life. Maggie and Lori find out and pry the door open before Beth can finish cutting her wrists; Maggie bars Andrea from the house as a result. In the episode "Better Angels", when the survivor group is allowed to move into the farm house, Maggie tells Glenn he can move into her room, but he declines. In the season finale "Beside the Dying Fire", a horde of walkers attacks the farm. After the farm is overrun and lives are lost, Maggie and Glenn are left to depend on each other as the group scatters. On the road, he declares his love for her. The two then reconnect with the surviving others on the highway.

==== Season 3 ====
In the season premiere "Seed", after spending the winter on the run, the group spots an abandoned prison and Maggie proves herself a capable soldier in helping to clear the yard of walkers. However, Hershel's leg is bitten and amputated in the process. In the episode "Sick", Maggie must come to terms with the possibility of losing her father. She sits with Hershel while he's unconscious and urges him to let go. In the episode "Killer Within", she is present when Lori goes into labor during a walker attack on the prison. Once Lori realizes she is about to hemorrhage to death, she orders Maggie to cut her open. Maggie obliges, saving the baby but losing Lori in the process.

In the episode "Say the Word", Daryl Dixon (Norman Reedus) and Maggie go to an abandoned daycare center to search for baby formula and infant supplies. In the episode "Hounded", while out on a supply run, she and Glenn are ambushed by Daryl's brother Merle (Michael Rooker) and brought to Woodbury for interrogation. In the episode "When the Dead Come Knocking", Glenn is tortured and Maggie is forced to strip for the Governor (David Morrissey), who threatens to rape her in his attempt to get her to divulge the location of their camp, which she eventually does when the Governor threatens to shoot Glenn.

In the mid-season finale "Made to Suffer", Rick Grimes' (Andrew Lincoln) group makes it into Woodbury and rescues the couple, but Daryl is captured. As they escape over the wall, Oscar (Vincent Ward) is mortally wounded, and Maggie shoots him in the head to prevent reanimation. In the mid-season premiere, "The Suicide King", Maggie goes back into Woodbury with Rick and rescues Daryl and Merle. In the episode "Home", back at the prison, Maggie initially pushes Glenn away until they reconcile after the incident. In the episode "I Ain't a Judas", when Andrea comes to the prison, Maggie tells her what the Governor and his men did to her and Glenn. In the episode "This Sorrowful Life", Glenn proposes thereafter, and Maggie accepts. In the season finale "Welcome to the Tombs", she then takes part in defending the prison from the Woodbury Army, hiding on the prison catwalk in a riot gear suit and shooting at them. When the chaos is finished, she is present as the remaining Woodbury citizens are welcomed into the prison.

==== Season 4 ====
In the season premiere, "30 Days Without an Accident", a few months later, Maggie uncharacteristically complies with Glenn's urging that she not to go on a run. It is revealed that the couple had a pregnancy scare. Maggie mentions that if she had indeed been pregnant, they could have a family, and seems to be starting to think about the idea. Glenn has more reservations. In the episode "Infected", she and Carl rescue Michonne (Danai Gurira) when she is attacked by walkers.

In the episode "Isolation", when a serious sickness ravages the Prison group, Maggie is one of the few not affected by it; even Glenn must be quarantined. Maggie and Rick try to talk Hershel out of going to treat the sick, but he insists that he needs to help them. In the episode "Internment", she tends to the fence along with Rick to keep the walkers from tearing it down, until Rick tells her to help Hershel when they hear gunshots. She finds Glenn unconscious and helps Hershel revive him, and soon Bob Stookey (Lawrence Gilliard, Jr.) arrives with antibiotics and administers them to Glenn. In the midseason finale, "Too Far Gone", Maggie witnesses the Governor kill her father and fights back when the Governor's group attacks the prison. Maggie rescues Glenn and puts him on the bus, but they get separated once the bus leaves. When Bob is shot, she escapes the prison with Sasha Williams (Sonequa Martin-Green) and Bob. In the episode "Inmates", Maggie searches for Glenn, with Sasha and Bob following her. After she finds the bus and clears it but finds no sign of Glenn, she breaks down first in tears and then in laughter because she knows Glenn is out there somewhere.

In the episode "Alone", when she finds a Terminus sign she wants to go. She believes Glenn could be there and leaves Sasha and Bob. Following the tracks, she leaves signs that she writes in walker blood telling Glenn to go to Terminus. Eventually, she rejoins Sasha and Bob to Terminus. In the episode "Us", the three run into Abraham Ford (Michael Cudlitz), Eugene Porter (Josh McDermitt), and Rosita Espinosa (Christian Serratos) and save Glenn and Tara Chambler (Alanna Masterson) from walkers in a tunnel. Maggie, with Glenn and the others, finally reach Terminus and are greeted by a resident named Mary, who offers them a plate of food. In the season finale "A", after Rick, Carl, Michonne and Daryl are captured by the residents of Terminus they are put into a train block, revealing that Maggie and the others were also put in there and they are all hostage.

==== Season 5 ====
In the season premiere "No Sanctuary", Maggie and the others escape from the cannibal compound of Terminus as Carol destroys the compound and infests with walkers. In the episode "Strangers", they meet Reverend Gabriel Stokes (Seth Gilliam), who takes them to his church. In the episode "Four Walls and a Roof", they re-encounter Gareth and the Hunters, whom they massacred, although Maggie does not take part. In the morning, after much negotiation and Bob's death, Maggie agrees to go to Washington, DC to bring Eugene, who claims to be a scientist and to have the cure for the outbreak. In the episode "Self Help", along the way, he reveals he has lied. In the episode "Crossed", they return to the church to meet Michonne, Carl and Gabriel. In the mid-season finale "Coda", Michonne reveals that Beth is alive and being held in Grady Memorial Hospital in Atlanta. However, by the time Maggie's group arrive, Beth has been killed in a hostage exchange and Maggie breaks down in tears.

In the mid-season premiere "What Happened and What's Going On", in the aftermath, Maggie, now the lone surviving Greene, is depressed but agrees to go on to Washington regardless, in hopes of a safe haven, despite encountering another loss with the death of Tyreese (Chad L. Coleman). In the episode "Them", Maggie is hostile towards Gabriel for abandoning his flock by locking them outside of his church. She bonds with the grieving Daryl and Sasha, before encountering Aaron (Ross Marquand), a recruiter for a community called Alexandria. In the episode "The Distance", while distrustful, they agree to go with him. In the episode "Remember", they meet leader and former congressperson, Deanna Monroe (Tovah Feldshuh) who assigns her as a personal assistant on the future operations of the town. In the episode "Forget", Maggie attends Deanna's party. In the episode "Spend", she overhears Gabriel telling Deanna about her group being dangerous. In the season finale, "Conquer", after Rick tries to resolve issues with Pete Anderson (Corey Britt), a doctor who is abusing his wife Jessie (Alexandra Breckenridge), she stands up for Rick and questions Deanna's own leadership in trying to exile her friend. She then leaves to confront Gabriel and finds Sasha holding him at gunpoint, but the three pray in healing, making peace at last.

==== Season 6 ====
In the season premiere, "First Time Again", Maggie deals with the aftermath of Glenn's confrontation with supply runner Nicholas (Michael Traynor). She tells Tara that Glenn spared his life, despite Nicholas' attempt to kill him. In the episode "JSS", she helps keep Deanna safe outside of the walls while the Wolves are slaughtering the residents inside. Once all of the wolves have escaped or been killed, Maggie goes back inside Alexandria and tells Deanna she needs to remain strong. In the episode "Now", Maggie goes searching for Glenn after his disappearance and tells Aaron that she is pregnant. In the episode "Heads Up", Maggie sees green balloons in the air and yells out that the new arrival is none other than Glenn. She then watches as the watch tower suddenly collapses on the Alexandria wall and the herd begins to make their way into the safe zone. In the mid-season finale "Start to Finish", Maggie runs up a near by lookout post to avoid the herd of walkers that have now swarmed the streets of Alexandria. In the midseason premiere, "No Way Out", Glenn and Enid (Katelyn Nacon) save Maggie from the lookout post and join the others in fighting the herd inside Alexandria.

In "Knots Untie", Maggie follows Paul "Jesus" Monroe (Tom Payne) to the Hilltop and negotiates a trading deal with its Governor, Gregory (Xander Berkely), to take care of a hostile group called the Saviors in exchange for food and supplies. In the episode, "Not Tomorrow Yet", Maggie and Carol are captured after infiltrating the Saviors' compound. In "The Same Boat", the Saviors take Maggie and Carol to a slaughterhouse in order to interrogate them until reinforcements arrive. Maggie and Carol are able to get free but Maggie wants to stay in order to kill the saviors. The two of them kill the Saviors, along with the reinforcements that show up shortly after. Maggie and Carol then meet back up with Rick and the group and head back to Alexandria. In the episode "East", Maggie is seen showering with Glenn, which reveals bruises on her hip and waist. In case the Saviors attack, Maggie suggest they create cache of guns throughout the community, to guarantee that they will have weapons. Later that evening, Enid cuts Maggie's hair, when she suddenly collapses onto the ground, screaming and holding her stomach. In the season finale, "Last Day on Earth", Rick, Carl, Sasha, Abraham, Eugene and Aaron drive the RV to get Maggie to the Hilltop's doctor, but they are trapped and captured by the Saviors. Their leader, Negan (Jeffrey Dean Morgan). arrives and sees a very ill Maggie, saying he should put her out of her misery. Negan then kills one of the group, which also includes Daryl, Rosita, Glenn, and Michonne, although it not shown who is killed.

==== Season 7 ====
In the season premiere, "The Day Will Come When You Won't Be," Maggie is forced to watch Abraham being beaten to death by Negan. An enraged Daryl tries to attack Negan, and Negan clubs Glenn over the head to make an example of him. Despite severe head trauma, Glenn manages to tell Maggie, "I'll find you" before Negan beats him to death. After the Saviors depart, a traumatized Maggie tells the others to return to Alexandria and prepare for war and let her get to Hilltop by herself. Sasha decides to take Maggie to Hilltop and keep her safe.

In the episode "Go-Getters," Maggie recovers as the doctor advises her to stay put for the safety of the baby. She is comforted by Sasha and Jesus, but is forced to deal with Gregory's cowardice and his refusal to keep them there. She also changes her last name to Rhee in honor of Glenn. Maggie helps stop an attack on the Hilltop using a tractor to destroy the car radio drawing walkers in, and gives orders to Sasha and Jesus. She punches Gregory after he tries to give them up to the Saviors.

Maggie is next seen in "Hearts Still Beating" where it's shown that she and Sasha have become quite well-liked in the Hilltop. She later reunites with Rick, Michonne, Carl, Rosita and Tara as well as Daryl as they come to the Hilltop to plan their next move against the Saviors. In "Rock in the Road," Maggie, along with Rick, try to talk Gregory into allowing the Hilltop to join Alexandria in their plot to rebel against Negan, with Gregory declining. In the episode "The Other Side," Maggie is seen training residents of the Hilltop and teaching them how to throw knives and the citizens of the Hilltop begin to look at her as their leader, making Gregory paranoid. Simon and the Saviors arrive at the Hilltop, causing Maggie and Daryl to hide in a cellar. While hiding, Daryl and Maggie talk about Glenn, causing Daryl to break down and cry, blaming himself for Glenn's death. Maggie insists that Glenn's death was not his fault, and the two of them embrace, with Maggie telling Daryl that they will defeat Negan.

In the episode "Something They Need," Maggie is seen gardening when Gregory approaches her. Gregory, realizing the people of the Hilltop are beginning to view Maggie as their leader, attempts to offer her a united front in leadership. Maggie says she will consider his offer and he contemplates killing her, but instead is saved by Maggie when a walker attacks him. In the season finale, "The First Day of the Rest of Your Life," Maggie learns that Sasha has been captured by the Saviors, Negan's former minion Dwight (Austin Amelio) is offering to help Alexandria, and that Negan knows about Rick's plan to rebel. Jesus asks Maggie what Hilltop should do, and Maggie says they will help Alexandria. Maggie, Jesus and citizens of the Hilltop travel to Alexandria and join Rick and the others in battling Negan and the Saviors, driving the Saviors to retreat. After the battle, Maggie and Jesus find Sasha, who is now a walker, and Maggie tearfully stabs her in the head. The season ends with Rick, Maggie, and King Ezekiel (Khary Payton), each leaders of their respective communities, uniting and agreeing to declare war.

==== Season 8 ====
In the season's opening episode "Mercy" Maggie joins Rick, Ezekiel and the others on their assault of The Sanctuary. Upon learning of Gregory's betrayal of his people, Jesus proclaims that the Hilltop has found a new leader in Maggie. By "Monsters" Maggie has returned to Hilltop. Gregory arrives pleading for Maggie to open the gate and forgive him. While she seems hesitant, she eventually lets him in. Later on, when Jesus brings a large group of Saviors to the Hilltop, Maggie is unsure whether or not keeping them as prisoners would be safe. In "The King, the Widow, and Rick" Maggie decides to keep them as prisoners in outdoor cells rather than kill them. Maggie also decides to hold Gregory prisoner, due to his reputation as being untrustworthy. That afternoon Aaron arrives at the Hilltop and he tells Maggie about his plan to convince Oceanside to join the war.

In "How It's Gotta Be" Maggie and her people are in a car on their way to Alexandria when Maggie sees a tree on a road. Simon and others appear with Jerry as a hostage at gunpoint. One passenger seated behind Maggie (named Neil) is killed by Negan's right-hand man Simon (Steven Ogg). After this, Simon lets her group go. Since one member of her group was murdered, Maggie has one Savior named Dean released from the prison and shot in front of the others. The following day Maggie sends that coffin back to Negan as a threat of what will happen to the other prisoners if the Saviors continue to fight. In "Dead or Alive Or" a Savior named Alden (Callan McAuliffe) suggests an agreement to Maggie that the prisoners be allowed to leave the cell supervised for a short period of time. At first she refuses, but eventually concedes. Later Maggie comforts Enid as she learns of Carl's death.

In "The Key" Maggie along with Rosita, Enid and Michonne head to a meeting after finding a mysterious care package outside of the Hilltops gates. The woman they meet calls herself Georgie (Jayne Atkinson) and gives Maggie hand drawn blueprints for buildings and machinery such as windmills to allow the Hilltop to thrive after the war. She refers to this as the "Key to the Future" and promises Maggie she will eventually be back. In "Do Not Send Us Astray" Maggie, along the rest of the survivors, prepare a plan to defend the Hilltop upon the Saviors attack. Maggie threatens to kill all of the prisoners if Simon, the de facto leader of the Saviors, does not stop an attack on Hilltop. However Simon starts the attack without thinking about the welfare of the prisoners. Alden asks if he can help, but Maggie sends him back to the others inside. Maggie is annoyed to learn that Negan is not at the battle, but thanks Rick for attempting to kill him earlier that day. Maggie's people praise her for saving them, but she says that the only reason she really wanted to fight the Saviors was so that she could finally kill Negan and avenge Glenn's death.

The night after the attack, Maggie is horrified to discover everyone wounded in the battle has turned into walker. Rick recalls that Negan's bat was covered in walker blood, leading them to realize that the Saviors used their weapons to infect them. Maggie goes to the cell to check on the prisoners, but only Alden remains. She turns her gun on him asking what happened. Alden explains that the other Saviors escaped but that he stayed as he has no reason to follow Negan anymore. The following morning, Maggie buries the dead.

==== Season 9 ====
In "A New Beginning," 18 months after the war with the Saviors, Maggie has won an election demanded by Gregory to determine who the leader of Hilltop will be. She has also given birth to Glenn's child, a boy whom she names Hershel in honor of her father.

Maggie joins a group traveling to Washington, D.C. for supplies, but Ken Sutton (AJ Achinger), a young Hilltopper, is killed by walkers during the mission. Gregory gets Ken's grieving father Earl (John Finn) drunk and persuades him try to assassinate Maggie. She fights off the attempt on her life and confronts Gregory, who then tries to kill Maggie himself. Fed up with Gregory's treachery and wanting to make an example, Maggie has a gallows built while talking with Rick about helping to repair a bridge to better link the communities together. That night, she has Daryl execute Gregory by hanging in front of all of Hilltop.

In "The Bridge," Maggie is pressured by Earl's wife Tammy Rose (Brett Butler) to release him from prison. Eventually, Maggie talks to Earl, who explains his history of alcoholism before Ken was born and his relapse after Ken's death. Sympathetic, Maggie releases Earl on parole, explaining to Michonne how her father Hershel was also a recovering alcoholic and also deserved a second chance; she then says that Gregory had several chances to do the right thing, but did not take them.

In "Warning Signs," Maggie discovers the murder of the antagonistic Savior Justin (Zach McGowan), leading to renewed tensions between the communities and the Saviors while the murder and several other disappearances are investigated. Maggie and Daryl eventually deduce that Oceanside is the culprit, seeking revenge upon the surviving Saviors who took part in the massacre of all of the males in their community over the age of ten. Maggie and Daryl catch up with Oceanside as they are about to execute Arat (Elizabeth Ludlow), their last target and the women explain that Maggie's execution of Gregory inspired them to act. Remembering Negan's cruelty, Maggie and Daryl allow Oceanside to kill Arat and decide that it is time to deal with Negan.

In "The Obliged," Maggie heads for Alexandria despite Jesus' attempts to talk her out of her plan while Daryl and her allies work to divert Rick and the others from stopping Maggie.

In "What Comes After," Maggie confronts Negan in his cell, where he begs her to kill him. Seeing how broken Negan has become, Maggie decides that the Negan that she wants to kill is already dead and leaves without harming him. Maggie takes part in the attempt to save Rick from the massive herd he is facing, and is devastated by Rick's apparent death when he blows up the bridge to stop the herd from reaching the Hilltop.

Six years later, Maggie is mentioned several times as being estranged from Michonne and her friends in Alexandria, presumably due to Michonne's decision to isolate Alexandria from the other communities. It is eventually revealed that Maggie left Hilltop to help Georgie and her group with another community far away. She is also close with Rick's daughter Judith (Cailey Fleming), who calls her "Aunt Maggie".

In "The Storm," after the trade fair massacre, it is mentioned that several letters have been sent to Maggie about the war with the Whisperers, but she has not responded to them.

==== Season 10 ====
In "Lines We Cross," Carol mentions that there has still been no response from Maggie to their letters about the Whisperers.

In "A Certain Doom," Maggie finally checks her mail and learns about the war with the Whisperers and the deaths of Tara, Jesus and Enid at the hands of the Whisperers' leader, Alpha (Samantha Morton). During the final battle with the Whisperers, Maggie and a masked survivor that she introduces as a friend appear in time to save Gabriel's life. Maggie is subsequently reunited with her surviving friends, talking with Alden and Judith as everyone celebrates the end of the war.

==== Season 11 ====
As Alexandria's food supplies dwindle, Maggie leads a team to scavenge her former home, Meridian, for supplies; she reluctantly includes Negan in the search. They are attacked by a horde of walkers in an abandoned subway station, and Maggie nearly dies when she loses her grip while climbing out. She is able to survive and escape, but realizes that Negan was going to let her die, intensifying their feud. She then finds Gage (Jackson Pace), an Alexandrian who had stolen food from the community, being attacked by walkers, and refuses to save him, letting him kill himself before the walkers devour his corpse.

Maggie's group is attacked by Reapers in the woods, and are forced to scatter. She finds Negan and Alden, the latter mortally injured and insisting on being left behind. Maggie and Negan leave him and go to a supply depot at Arbor Hills, eventually meeting up with Gabriel and Elijah (Okea Eme-Akwari). Negan makes a Whisperer mask for Maggie, and tells her that he should have killed Rick's entire group, including her, because it would have made life safer for the other communities that the Saviors ruled. Maggie still hates him, but appreciates his honesty.

Maggie later helps steer a horde of walkers away from Alexandria toward Meridian, which is now ruled by the ruthless Pope (Ritchie Coster). After Pope and his men destroy the horde, they attack Maggie's group. She kills several Reapers in cold blood, and puts Alden, now reanimated as a walker, out of his misery. After Pope is killed and the Reapers are defeated, Maggie goes back to Alexandria with her group, except for Negan, who goes off on his own upon realizing that Maggie will always hate him.

Six months later, Maggie is the leader of Hilltop, and gets into a dispute with another community called Commonwealth, whose army is led by Daryl. Maggie allows them to stay to avoid another war. Commonwealth's corrupt Governor, Pamela Milton (Laila Robins), and her right-hand man, Lance Hornsby (Josh Hamilton), try to persuade her to merge Hilltop into Commonwealth, reasoning that the "new world" they are building means a better future for her and Herschel. Maggie ultimately declines the offer, however, because she does not trust Milton. Meanwhile, she once again encounters Negan, who is now married to a woman named Annie (Medina Senghore), who is pregnant with his child. Seeing that having a family has changed Negan for the better, Maggie slowly begins to trust him.

When Milton's son Sebastian (Teo Rapp-Olsson) uses the Commonwealth's police to steal a cache of money and weapons, he frames Maggie. Hornsby interrogates Hershel for his mother's whereabouts, leading to a tense confrontation between him and Maggie when she resurfaces to protect her son. She then leaves Hilltop to keep Hershel safe, leaving the boy in the care of Negan and Annie. She is then kidnapped by Leah Shaw (Lynn Collins), a former Reaper now working for Hornsby, and Daryl's former lover, who holds her prisoner in her cabin. Maggie gets free and fights Leah, who overpowers and tries to kill her. Daryl saves Maggie at the last second, however, by killing Leah. Maggie and Daryl flee the cabin just as Hornsby and his men descend upon it, and they rendezvous with Negan to prepare for war with the Commonwealth.

While tracking one of the Commonwealth's convoys, Maggie is separated from Hershel, and fears he is dead; after putting down a child walker that resembles Hershel, she is haunted by the possibility that she may have killed her own son. She then discovers that the convoy is in fact headed for Alexandria, and declares that her group will get their home back. She infiltrates Commonwealth's prison, where she finds Hershel, alive but locked in a cage by the sadistic warden, and saves him. by She and Daryl lead an attack on the Commonwealth, during which Milton fires at her. Judith shields Maggie, and is seriously wounded.

After Maggie's group joins with Commonwealth's military in overthrowing Milton, they prepare to defend their community against a huge horde of walkers. Maggie and Negan serve as snipers, and Maggie saves Milton from being eaten by a zombiefied Hornsby, reasoning that, for Milton, prison is a worse punishment than death. After the horde is destroyed, Maggie has one last conversation with Negan, who has decided to leave the Commonwealth with Annie. Maggie says she will never be able to forgive him, but will try to get past her anger to move on with her life and set an example for Hershel. Soon afterward, Maggie bids goodbye to Rosita, who is on her deathbed after being bitten by a walker.

One year later, Maggie is the leader of Hilltop, which thrives under her stewardship.

==== Dead City ====
Several years after the end of The Walking Dead, Maggie seeks out the help of Negan, revealing that Hershel has been kidnapped and taken to a walker-infested Manhattan by a man known only as the Croat. In the years since the defeat of Pamela Milton and Lance Hornsby, Maggie has been forced to abandon the original Hilltop due to the damage from the Whisperers ultimately being too severe to repair, instead relocating the community to a rural factory complex in either New York or New Jersey. This new Hilltop was raided by the Croat who Maggie had recognized as a former Savior from his use of Savior tactics and, in particular, the whistle that the Saviors used to intimidate their victims. The two agree to a deal where Maggie will allow Negan's young companion Ginny to live at the Hilltop in exchange for his help. With the kidnapping of her son and her reunion and reluctant alliance with her husband's killer, Maggie is forced to deal with a resurgence of trauma over Glenn's death, particularly as Negan has reverted back to many of his old ways. However, she also starts to see previous events from the perspective of Negan and the Saviors that he was protecting as Maggie learns more about the Croat's past as one of Negan's first Saviors and ends up on the other side of Negan's protective and occasionally murderous charisma.

== Development ==
Lauren Cohan was officially announced as being cast in June 2011, along with co-stars Scott Wilson and Pruitt Taylor Vince. She was promoted to series regular starting with the third season. She was the top billed female actress on the show as of season four, until her departure in season nine.

=== Salary dispute ===
At the conclusion of the eighth season, Cohan finished her contract on The Walking Dead as a series regular. It was later reported Cohan had not reached an agreement to sign on for season 9 as a main cast member due to a pay dispute, as she demanded an enhanced salary closer to her male co-stars Andrew Lincoln and Norman Reedus. AMC refused, and Cohan began making herself available for TV pilots. She booked the role of CIA operative Francesca "Frankie" Trowbridge in the ABC pilot Whiskey Cavalier, co-starring with Scott Foley. It was later confirmed she had reached an agreement to appear in season 9 under a limited capacity of 6 episodes in the first half of season 9. Later, it was confirmed Whiskey Cavalier was picked up to series; the show was cancelled after one season. Cohan was confirmed to return to The Walking Dead as a series regular for its eleventh and final season, after her recurring role in the second half of the tenth season.

== Critical reception ==
The character has received very positive reviews, with many critics praising Maggie's relationship with Glenn, Lauren Cohan's emotional performance, and the character's growth, as well as her interactions with Hershel Greene. The episode "Cherokee Rose" marks Glenn and Maggie's first sexual encounter. Critics commended the development of the relationship between Maggie and Glenn. Andrew Conrad of The Baltimore Sun stated that the storyline epitomized a "steamy romance", while The Wall Street Journal's Aaron Rutkoff called it "the funniest moment of the series." Goldman opined that their sexual encounter felt genuine; "He's a nice guy, she seems like a cool gal, and it felt genuine when she noted she felt plenty lonely too and ready for some companionship." Nick Venable of Cinema Blend asserted that the interactions between Maggie and Glenn were the highlight of the episode. "I'm glad the writers are introducing this comic book plot point, as this show seriously needs a couple without closets full of skeletons. When Glenn accidentally grabs a box of condoms for Maggie to see, I chuckled heartily. The ensuing conversation also made me smile, which makes me wonder why humor is paid the least amount of attention on the show." Jackson was surprised with the scene, and called it "unexpected".

The progressing relationship between Maggie and Glenn in "Secrets" was well received by critics. Nate Rawlings of Time asserted that their interactions carried the most emotional poignance. Rawlings opined: "She's forced to confront, perhaps for the first time, that these creatures are slobbering monsters. Before her attack, she yelled at Dale [sic] for calling them Walkers; to her they're mom, her brother, the neighbors. After her attack, her mind might be changed."

Cohan's performance in "Killer Within" was praised by Eric Goldman. Goldman later praised Cohan in "When the Dead Come Knocking" when referring to the scene where The Governor forces Maggie to strip saying: "More importantly, what he did do to her was terrible as it was, as he forced her to strip, slammed her down on a table and basically did all he could to try and mentally break her. Her telling him, in the face of all this, "Do whatever you're gonna do. Go to hell" was a powerful moment for Maggie. Lauren Cohan did terrific work here, showing someone simultaneously terrified and defiant in the face of a hellish scenario."

In "Coda", Cohan's performance was praised, in particular, the scene where Maggie reacts to Beth's death. Laura Prudom of Variety said: "The episode's final few moments did prove to be some of the series' most powerful yet — both Lauren Cohan and Norman Reedus gave truly gut-wrenching performances after Beth's death, and it was heartbreaking to see Maggie's rapid transition from elation at learning her sister was alive to utter devastation at seeing her dead over the course of twenty minutes."

Noel Murray of Rolling Stone ranked Maggie Greene 7th in a list of 30 best Walking Dead characters, saying, "She's developed political acumen thanks to the tutelage of Deanna, and has used it to fill the void within the survivors and become the group's real leader. And while she experimented with becoming as razor-edged as Carol, she ultimately realized that hardness didn't fit her personality or perspective. Battle-tested, strong-willed, and played with real nuance and grace by Lauren Cohan, the young Ms. Greene has quietly become a Walking Dead MVP. Give 'em hell, Maggie."
