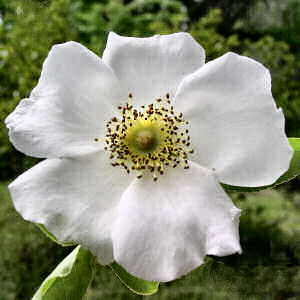

Scientific classification
- Kingdom: Plantae
- Clade: Tracheophytes
- Clade: Angiosperms
- Clade: Eudicots
- Clade: Rosids
- Order: Rosales
- Family: Rosaceae
- Genus: Rosa
- Species: R. laevigata

Binomial name
- Rosa laevigata Michx.

Synonyms
- List: Rosa amygdalifolia Ser.; Rosa argyi H.Lév.; Rosa camellia Siebold; Rosa cherokeensis Donn ex Small; Rosa cucumerina Tratt.; Rosa hystrix Lindl.; Rosa nivea DC.; Rosa sinica var. fortuneana Regel; Rosa ternata Poir.; Rosa triphylla Roxb.

= Rosa laevigata =

Species of vine

Rosa laevigata, or the Cherokee rose, is a white, fragrant rose native to southern China, Taiwan and Vietnam. It is an invasive species in countries including Australia, Japan and the United States.

It is typically found in sunny environments such as mountain fields, field margins, and along streams, at elevations ranging from 200 to 1600 meters. In Tibet, its distribution is primarily confined to the sunny mountainous regions of southern Tibet, where it occurs at higher altitudes between 1500 and 3500 meters.

== Description ==
It is an evergreen climbing shrub, scrambling over other shrubs and small trees to heights of up to 5–10 metres (16–33 ft). The leaves are 3–10 centimetres (1.2–3.9 in) long, with usually three leaflets, sometimes five leaflets, bright glossy green and glabrous. The flowers are 6–10 centimetres (2.4–3.9 in) diameter, fragrant, with pure white petals and yellow stamens, and are followed by bright red and bristly hips 2–4 centimetres (0.79–1.57 in) diameter. The flower stem is also very bristly.

== Cultivation ==
The species was introduced to the southeastern United States in about 1780, where it soon became naturalized, and was then given its English common name.

== Cultural references ==
The flower has no association to Cherokee culture. It is a non-indigenous invasive species that climbs over and smothers existing vegetation.

Though it has no connection to the Cherokee Nation, it is occasionally used as a symbol of Cherokee resistance following their eviction from the southern United States via the Trail of Tears.

== Medical use ==
R. laevigata has a history of applications in traditional Chinese medicine, with its initial documentation dating back to between 935 and 960 AD. Different components of the plant, notably the fruits (also known as Jin Ying Zi) and roots (Jin Ying Gen), have been utilized for their reported therapeutic properties. Within Chinese traditional medicine, the fruit has been traditionally associated with effects such as consolidating "essence", reducing frequent urination, addressing metrorrhagia, and acting as an astringent in the intestines to manage diarrhea. The root has been traditionally used to strengthen "essence", intestinal astringent, and in the treatment of conditions such as spermatorrhea, enuresis, dysentery, diarrhea, metrorrhagia, uterine prolapse, hemorrhoids, and burns. Regional records in Chinese medicine additionally suggest its use for hypospermia, leucorrhea, pubic erections, chronic deficiency diarrhea, dysentery, stomach discomfort, children's enuresis, bruises, lumbar spinal discomfort, rheumatic joint pain, and uterine prolapse.

Contemporary pharmacological investigations have explored the potential medicinal applications of R. laevigata, with some studies indicating various biological activities. Both the fruit and root extracts have shown early indications of antioxidant, anti-inflammatory, antiviral, and anti-tumor effects in experimental models. Furthermore, observations suggest they may possess renal protective, immunomodulatory, lipid-lowering, cardiovascular protective, and bacteriostatic properties. Certain extracts have been investigated for their potential to address age-related urinary incontinence, support kidney function, reduce frequent night urination, and potentially influence gastrointestinal tract function.
