= Jane McNeill =

American actress

- Born: Jane McNeill; Whiteville, North Carolina, U.S.
- Education: University of North Carolina at Chapel Hill; DePaul University
- Occupation: Actress
- Years active: 1990–present
- Spouse(s): Yoel Balter (m. 1996)

Jane McNeill-Balter, professionally credited as Jane McNeill, is an American stage, film and television actress, best known to television audiences for her recurring role as Patricia on the second season of The Walking Dead.

== Life and career ==
McNeill is a native of Whiteville, North Carolina, in Columbus County. She is the daughter of John McNeill and Margaret Powell McNeill. McNeill first became involved in theater and acting as a sixth grader. She earned a bachelor's degree in journalism from the University of North Carolina at Chapel Hill, but began taking drama classes during her sophomore year at the university. She attended the Eugene O'Neill Theater Center in Connecticut and interned at the Arkansas Repertory Theater in Little Rock following college. McNeill worked as an actor in Wilmington, North Carolina, for one year, and then relocated to Kentucky, where she joined a repertory theater for six months.

In 1990, McNeill moved to Chicago, Illinois, to pursue acting and theater. By her own accounts, she "spent eight years doing theater and waiting tables." McNeill went back to school, earning a master's degree in education from DePaul University. She taught drama and English in the Chicago area until she returned to North Carolina in 1999.

McNeill married her husband, Yoel Balter, in 1996. The couple moved to Wilmington, North Carolina, in December 1999, where McNeill worked in human resources. They have two children - Abby (born in 2001) and Ben (born in 2004). They relocated to the Chapel Hill area, where her husband earned a J.D. from UNC-Chapel Hill in 2007. The entire family returned to Wilmington in 2007.

McNeill was diagnosed with breast cancer shortly after returning to Wilmington. Her treatment and recovery put her acting career briefly on hold. In 2012, she told The News Reporter, "I had planned to start auditioning, but by the time we were settled, I learned I had breast cancer...After a year of recovery, acting was at the top of my 'bucket list' so I started taking classes with casting director Tracy Kilpatrick...Tracy was very instrumental in helping me transition from stage to screen acting...Moreover, she really believed in me and cast me in my first feature film." She signed with a talent agent, Susan Tolar-Walters of STW Talent, during the spring of 2011.

In early June 2011, McNeill was performing in a local play, "The Hallelujah Girls," when she received an email offering her a three-episode audition for the second season of The Walking Dead. She auditioned for the part of Patricia. Three weeks later, the day before a family trip to New York City, McNeill learned that the role was between either her or a second actress. The next day, McNeill learned she had gotten the part shortly after her plane landed in New York. McNeill's original three episode role expanded to include the second season. She filmed episodes of The Walking Dead every two weeks from July to November 2011. Filming for season two wrapped in November 2011. In December 2011, McNeill began filming Hornet's Nest, a 2012 TNT television film based on the novel of the same name by Patricia Cornwell, starring Virginia Madsen, Sherry Stringfield, Michael Boatman, Robbie Amell, and Quentin Kerr.

After The Walking Dead, McNeill began appearing in both film and television, playing supporting roles. She has appeared in the 2012 found footage horror film The Bay, Academy Award-winning film Dallas Buyers Club (2013), and well as Mississippi Grind and Magic Mike XXL in 2015. She later played Aunt Estelle in the NBC television movies Dolly Parton's Coat of Many Colors (2015) and Dolly Parton's Christmas of Many Colors: Circle of Love (2016), and in 2018 had a recurring role in the SundanceTV drama series, Hap and Leonard.

== Filmography ==
=== Film ===
Year	Title	Role	Notes
2011	Don't Know Yet	Roberta	
2012	The Bay	Victim One	
2013	Prisoners	Nurse	
2013	Dallas Buyers Club	Francine Suskind	
2013	The Last of Robin Hood	Cynthia Gould	
2014	Where the Devil Hides	Sarah's mother	
2015	Mississippi Grind	Bloody Mary Kate	
2015	Magic Mike XXL	Mae	
2015	Wake of Vultures	Kristine Spears	Short film
2015	Well Wishes	Penelope's Mother	
2016	Times Like Dying	Bank Teller (voice)	Short film
2017	Permanent	Tommie Jo	
2018	An L.A. Minute	Tappy	
2018	American Animals	Mrs. Reinhard	
2018	Venom	Restaurant Patron	
2019	The Highwaymen	Emma Parker	
2020	Drought	Lorraine	
2020	Uncle Frank	Neva	

=== Television ===
Year	Title	Role	Notes
2011-2012	The Walking Dead	Patricia	Season 2 (recurring role; 11 episodes)
2012	Hornet's Nest	Vicky Luby	Television film
2013	Bonnie and Clyde: Dead and Alive	Mom Johnson	Episode: Part 2
2014	Rectify	Debbie Wages	Episode: "Sleeping Giants"
2015	Nashville	Cashier	Episode: "Please Help Me, I'm Fallin'"
2015	Dolly Parton's Coat of Many Colors	Aunt Estelle	Television film
2016	Dolly Parton's Christmas of Many Colors: Circle of Love	Aunt Estelle	Television film
2017	Outcast	Thin Woman	Episodes: "Alone When It Comes" and "Mercy"
2017	Queen Sugar	Nadine Barrett	Episode" "My Soul's High Song"
2017-2019	Living the Dream	Larissa	4 episodes
2018	Hap and Leonard	Maude	5 episodes
2019	Patsy & Loretta	Whiskey Soaked Lady	Television film
2022	Ozark	Annalise	5 episodes
2022	Florida Man	Angela Monroe	Recurring role
