= Vatos =

- The Walking Dead episode
- Rick and Daryl Dixon draw weapons on a local gang.
- Episode no.: Season 1 Episode 4
- Directed by: Johan Renck
- Written by: Robert Kirkman
- Cinematography by: David Boyd
- Editing by: Sidney Wolinsky
- Original air date: November 21, 2010

Guest appearances
- Norman Reedus as Daryl Dixon; Emma Bell as Amy; Andrew Rothenberg as Jim; Juan Pareja as Morales; Noel G. as Felipe; IronE Singleton as Theodore "T-Dog" Douglas; Adam Minarovich as Ed Peletier; Melissa McBride as Carol Peletier; Jeryl Prescott Sales as Jacqui; Madison Lintz as Sophia Peletier; Maddie Lomax as Eliza Morales; Neil Brown Jr. as Guillermo; Anthony Guajardo as Miguel; Gina Morelli as Abuela; James Gonzaba as Jorge

Episode chronology
← Previous "Tell It to the Frogs"	Next → "Wildfire"
- The Walking Dead season 1

"Vatos" is the fourth episode of the first season of the post-apocalyptic horror television series The Walking Dead. It originally aired on AMC in the United States on November 21, 2010. The episode was written by Robert Kirkman and directed by Johan Renck. In the episode, Rick Grimes (Andrew Lincoln), Daryl Dixon (Norman Reedus), Theodore "T-Dog" Douglas (IronE Singleton), and Glenn Rhee (Steven Yeun) return to downtown Atlanta in search of Daryl's brother, Merle. The group are later targeted by a Latino gang, whose leader threatens to kill them if they do not relinquish their weapons. Meanwhile, Lori Grimes (Sarah Wayne Callies) and Shane Walsh (Jon Bernthal)'s relationship begins to crumble.

Major events in "Vatos" include the deaths of several recurring characters, including Amy (Emma Bell) and Ed Peletier (Adam Minarovich). This episode was filmed in several locations in Atlanta, Georgia, including the Goat Farm Arts Center. "Vatos" was lauded by television commentators, who praised its storyline progression and character development. Upon initial airing, it attained 4.75 million viewers and a 2.4/6 rating in the 18-49 demographic, according to Nielsen ratings. The episode became the highest-rated cable program of the day, as well as the ninth most-watched cable program of the week.

== Plot ==
The episode opens as sisters Andrea and Amy are fishing for the survivors in a nearby quarry lake, discussing their childhood and hopes that Florida, where their parents live, was not hit as hard by the zombie epidemic.

In Atlanta, Rick, Daryl, Glenn, and T-Dog have discovered the severed hand of Merle, Daryl's brother, where Rick had handcuffed him on the roof of a store. They follow a trail of blood to show Merle had killed some walkers and managed to cauterize the stump of his hand before finding out that he escaped the building, resulting in the trail going cold.

At the survivors' camp, Jim begins digging holes, refusing to explain why. As the survivors press him, he lashes back at them, forcing Shane Walsh to restrain Jim. Jim breaks down, explaining how he lost his family to walkers, and that a dream inspired him to dig the holes. Jim warns Lori Grimes to keep her son Carl safe.

In Atlanta, Rick's group comes into conflict with the Vatos, a group of Latinos that kidnap Glenn and demand they exchange Rick's bag of weapons for his return. When they face-off at the Vatos' base, they discover it is a hidden nursing home, and the Vatos are only trying to protect their own family. Rick leaves some of his weapons and ammo for the Vatos, and Glenn is returned unharmed. Rick's group finds their vehicle missing, and suspect Merle took it seeking vengeance on the survivors', and they start to race on foot back to the camp.

At the camp, the other survivors are enjoying dinner when a horde of walkers suddenly appear, biting several of the members including Amy and Ed Peletier. Rick and the others arrive in time to quell the walkers. Amy dies in Andrea's arms, and as the others stand around in shock, Jim recalls why he had dug those holes.

== Production ==
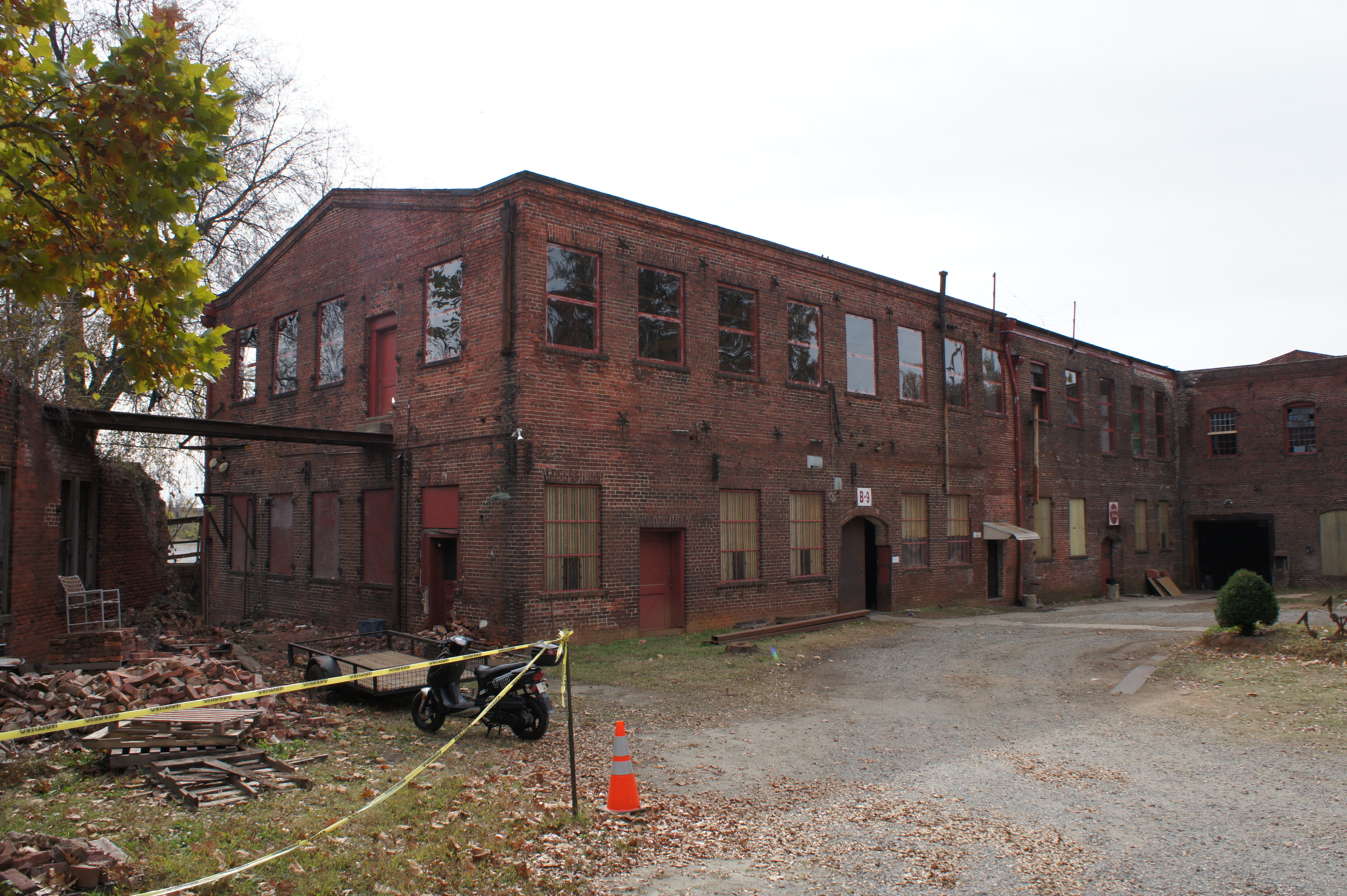
Filming for the episode commenced in several locations throughout Atlanta, including the Goat Farm Arts Center.

"Vatos" was directed by Johan Renck and written by Robert Kirkman; this episode became Kirkman's first writing credit for the series. "I was pretty happy that the first death in the show was in an episode that I got to write," he stated. "That was kind of cool." The episode's script was heavily modified by Kirkman, and series creator Frank Darabont prior to airing. Neil Brown Jr. initially collaborated with producers on directing the episode but eventually pulled out of the project.

Principal photography for the episode transpired at the Goat Farm Arts Center in the West Midtown neighborhood of Atlanta, Georgia. "Vatos" features a sequence near the conclusion of the episode, in which a horde of walkers invades and attacks the campgrounds. The scene was written by Robert Kirkman, who based it closely on a similar sequence in the comics. Kirkman stated that he was excited to develop the sequence and added that it was a familiar task for him:

It was very exciting. I got to write the attack at the end of the episode—which was very much something that happened in the comic book series—so I knew I would be revisiting something I had already written. But as we were in the writers' room, when things started shifting which led to all this new stuff that wasn't in the comic book series, I thought that was great because it wasn't me writing the same-old same-old or rewriting something I had already done and trying to make it interesting for myself. It was really an entirely new story: getting the gang members in there and getting to write Daryl [...] which is one of my favorite characters on the show, despite the fact that he's not in the comic book. It was a blast.

Alongside the main cast, the episode introduced Vatos band, composed by Neil Brown Jr. as Guillermo, Noel G. as Felipe, Anthony Guajardo as Miguel, Gina Morelli as Abuela, and James Gonzaba as Jorge. The rest of the gang is formed by Roger Herrera and Timothy Douglas Perez. This episode marked the last regular appearance of Emma Bell (Amy), whose character was killed off in the conclusion of the installment. Her death is considered one of the twentieth most shocking deaths in the series. Greg Nicotero, the show's production designer, enacted the walker who bites Amy. Bell stated that Nicotero placed a skin-colored prosthetic around her neck, which consisted of a layer of red viscous liquid and a hose. Once it was bitten into, the prosthetic exploded and resembled a severe flesh wound. Kirkman expressed that it was difficult for him to remove Bell from the cast but was thankful that she understood she would only be limited to a certain number of episodes; he stated:

It's something that's very difficult for me. Because it is lines on paper when I do it in the comic book series. It's like, 'Oh, okay, Charlie Adlard [...] doesn't have to draw that arrangement of lines anymore, that person is dead.' But it's very uncomfortable for me to be on set, because I see these actors that are there and, in the source material, I have killed all but two of them. I walk through the set and I'm like, 'Yep, killed that one, killed that one, killed that one.' And it is firing those people. I feel really bad for Emma Bell, just because she was great and I would have liked to have had her in the show. But, you know, this is The Walking Dead, characters have got to die. Thankfully, Emma was brought onto the show with the understanding that she was only going to be in a certain number of episodes and she knew that she was going to die from the very beginning. But it doesn't really make it any easier. When they were shooting those scenes, I had to fly to Comic-Con and so I wasn't actually there for when she died. But it was very emotional on set and I know that she was very upset about having to leave the crew and the actors. You kind of become a family when you're doing a TV show and it's a little upsetting to have to get rid of somebody.

A deleted scene from the beginning of the show's second season depicts Rick and crew revisiting the Vatos in search of refuge after the destruction of the CDC but finding everyone dead, including the old people. Another gang had apparently overrun the Atlanta nursing home, killed everyone inside, and taken their food, weapons, and supplies. Robert Kirkman later reiterated the Vatos gang's fate in a 2018 episode of Talking Dead, stating that they had all perished.

== Reception ==
=== Ratings ===
"Vatos" originally aired on November 21, 2010, in the United States on AMC. The episode attained 4.75 million viewers upon airing, and garnered a 2.7/4 HH rating. Additionally, it received a 2.4/6 rating in the 18-49 demographic, according to Nielsen ratings. "Vatos" became the highest-rated cable program of the night, and the ninth most-watched cable program of the week. Ratings and total viewership for the episode moderately declined from the preceding installment, "Tell It to the Frogs", which was watched by 5.07 million viewers and a 2.5/7 rating in the 18-49 demographic. In the United Kingdom, the episode received 467,000 viewers and became the highest-rated cable program on FX of the week dated November 28.

=== Critical response ===
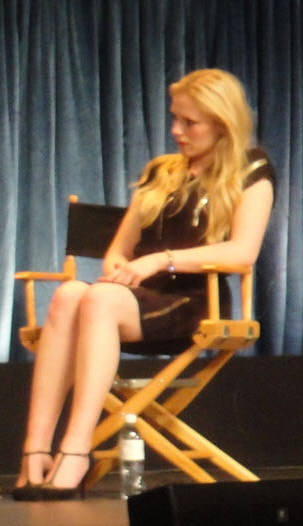
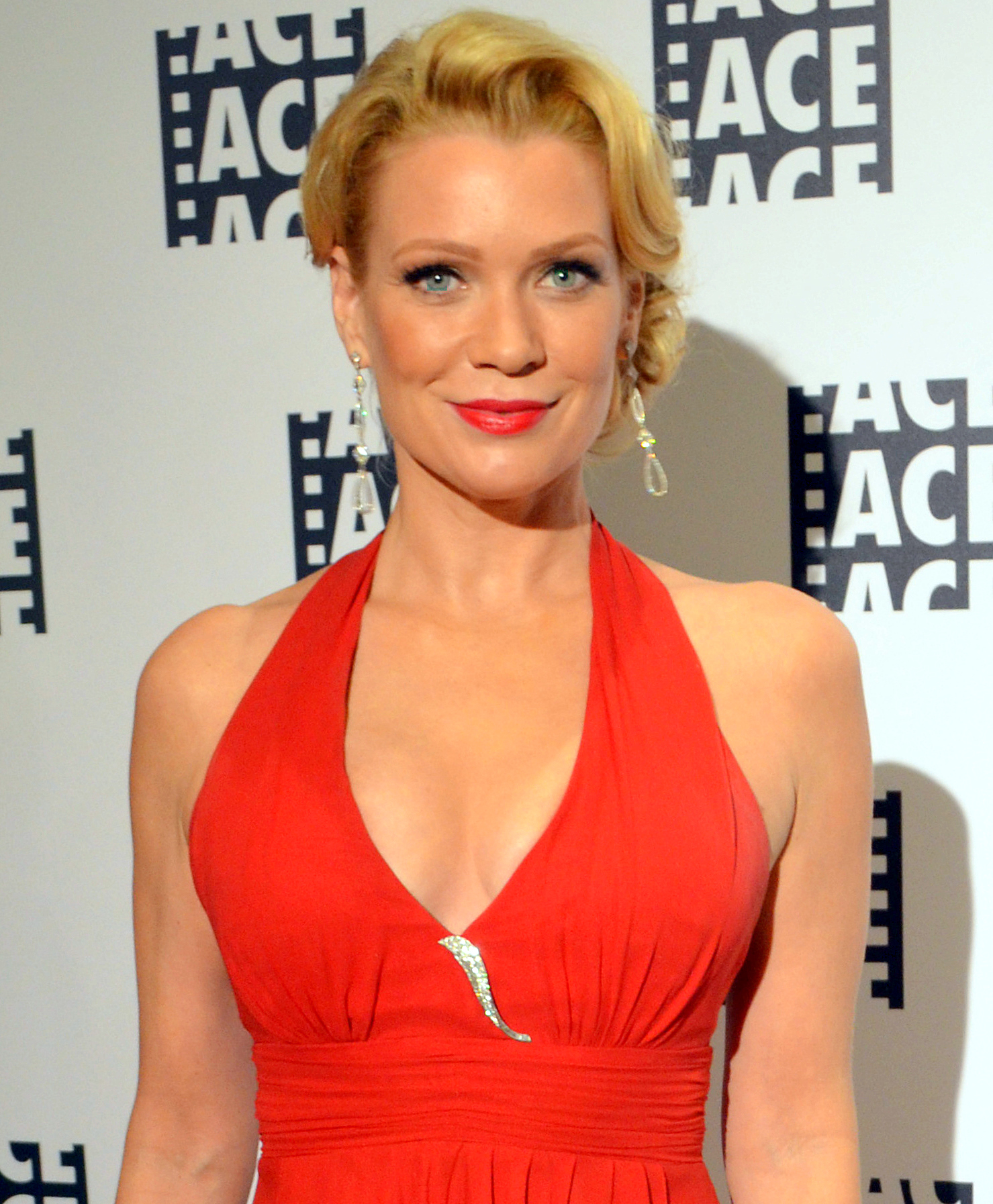
The interactions between Amy (Emma Bell, left) and Andrea (Laurie Holden, right) were acclaimed by critics.

"Vatos" attained general acclaim from television critics. James Poniewozik of Time asserted that the episode successfully made the viewers experience the daily life of the show's characters, and HitFix's Alan Sepinwall felt that "Vatos" was the strongest episode since the series' pilot episode. In his 7.9 out of 10 star review, Josh Jackson of Paste wrote: "The whole spectrum of human nature is on view when civilization is stripped away—the bigger the immediate threat, the more varied the response. And it's this balance between action/horror and personal drama that makes The Walking Dead so compelling." Los Angeles Times writer Gina McIntyre felt that Kirkman "seemed right at home adapting his characters for the screen."

John Griffiths, writing for Us Weekly, felt the installment was haunting enough to "make viewers leave their lights on afterward", and opined that the character development and the progression of the storylines served as the episode's highlights. John Serba of The Grand Rapids Press stated that "Vatos" was the most emotionally poignant episode of The Walking Dead so far. Expressing similar sentiments, IGN's Eric Goldman evaluated the episode as "strong", ultimately giving it a nine out of ten, signifying an "amazing" rating. Leonard Pierce of The A.V. Club, who issued the episode a B grade, was less enthusiastic than the general consensus. Pierce felt that the bulk of the episode was "mushy" and concluded that it "didn't solve anything involving the ongoing plot and introduced a bunch of arbitrary, needless complications that had no payoff, [and] bogged it down quite a bit."

Critics praised the interactions between Amy and Andrea. Serba asserted that Kirkman effectively set up Amy's death at the beginning of the episode, and added that it established a sisterly bond. Serba also acclaimed Laurie Holden's performance; he stated that she "powerfully conveys her grief and despair." Pierce avouched that the opening sequence was likable, while Michelle Kung of The Wall Street Journal summated that the concluding scene was "an emotional release after a tense build-up."

Critics were divided about Rick Grimes' return to Atlanta, as well as his stand off with Guillermo and his gang. Scott Meslow of The Atlantic compared Grimes to Mad Men's Don Draper, and questioned his character development: "So far, every decision Rick has made has been both within his code and consequence-free," he said. Pierce opined: "Dramatically, this whole sequence plays out pretty hokily. Guillermo's dialogue is ridiculous, and the entire storyline plays like something out of an episodic social-lesson-of-the-week show. Since nothing ends up coming of it from a plot standpoint [...], it's hard not to think of it as one of those comics where two superheros [sic] have a big fight scene that turns out to be mistaken identity."
