= The Walking Dead season 1 =

First season of the zombie TV series

The Walking Dead
- Season 1
- Promotional poster and home media cover art featuring Rick Grimes arriving to an abandoned Atlanta
- Showrunner: Frank Darabont
- Starring: Andrew Lincoln; Jon Bernthal; Sarah Wayne Callies; Laurie Holden; Jeffrey DeMunn; Steven Yeun; Chandler Riggs
- No. of episodes: 6

Release
- Original network: AMC
- Original release: October 31 – December 5, 2010

Season chronology
- Next → Season 2

The first season of The Walking Dead, an American post-apocalyptic horror television series on AMC, premiered on October 31, 2010, and concluded on December 5, 2010, consisting of 6 episodes. Developed for television by Frank Darabont, who wrote or co-wrote four of the season's six episodes and directed the pilot episode, "Days Gone Bye", the series is based on the eponymous series of comic books by Robert Kirkman, Tony Moore, and Charlie Adlard. It was executive produced by Darabont, Kirkman, David Alpert, Charles H. Eglee, and Gale Anne Hurd, with Darabont assuming the role of showrunner.

This season adapts material from issues #1–6 of the comic book series and introduces notable comic character Rick Grimes (Andrew Lincoln), who awakens from a coma, after being shot, in a post-apocalyptic world filled with flesh-eating zombies, dubbed "walkers". After befriending Morgan Jones (Lennie James), Rick sets out to find his family and discover the origins of the walker virus.

The season received widespread critical acclaim from critics. It was nominated for the Golden Globe Award for Best Television Series – Drama at the 68th Golden Globe Awards and received nominations for the 63rd Primetime Creative Arts Emmy Awards in several categories, winning Outstanding Prosthetic Makeup for a Series, Miniseries, Movie, or Special. The pilot episode received 5.35 million viewers, and the finale garnered six million viewers, including four million viewers among adults ages 18–49, making it the most viewed basic cable drama series at that time. Based on its reception, AMC renewed the series for a second season consisting of 13 episodes, which premiered on October 16, 2011.

== Production ==
=== Conception ===
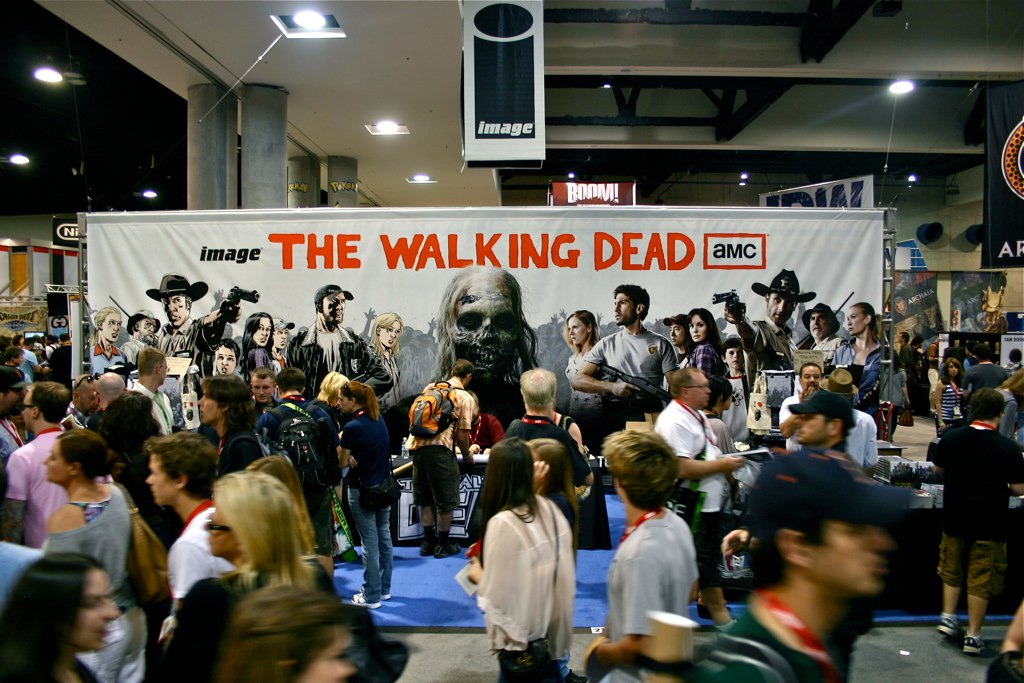
A set-up of The Walking Dead at San Diego Comic-Con in 2010

Robert Kirkman, who created the comic book series in 2003, says he had considered the idea of a Walking Dead television series, but never actively pursued it. "I certainly wanted it to happen, just because I knew it would be good for the book... I'm certainly not against adaptations, like some creators." When Frank Darabont became interested in adapting the comic books for television, Kirkman said it was "extremely flattering" and went on to say that, "He definitely cares about the original source material, and you can tell that in the way he's adapting it. It's an extreme validation of the work... Never in a million years could I have thought that if Walking Dead were to ever be adapted that everything would be going this well. I think that that's all because of Frank."

Darabont himself had been a fan of the zombie genre since seeing George A. Romero's 1968 film Night of the Living Dead when he was fourteen years old. ""Night of the Living Dead" had this weird vibe that was almost - it was like pornography... It had this marvelously attractive, disreputable draw... I loved it immediately." Darabont recalls walking into a comic book store in Burbank, California and seeing The Walking Dead on the shelf in 2005. "Being that I've always had "the love of zombies genre," I of course grabbed it, took it home and read it, and immediately started pursuing the rights to it. I thought it would make a great TV show... I loved the idea of an extended, ongoing, serialized dramatic presentation set in the zombie apocalypse." He described the process of developing the series and getting it set up at a network as "four years of frustration," and credits executive producer Gale Anne Hurd with finally getting the series on AMC. "I can't remember what the hell prompted her to read it [the script], but she said, "Wow, I really love this pilot you wrote. What are you doing with it?" I said I'd been trying to set it up forever... She said "I think AMC might be the place to take this." She did, and then bam! They were immediately interested. I had to credit Gale, her insight into marrying the material and the buyer."

=== Writing ===
Darabont's original pilot script was split in half and embellished, making the first two episodes instead of one, "...just to slow the narrative down and dig into the characters more deeply, so it's not just plot-driven, event-driven stuff. You really want to drag these characters into the equation." To write the remaining episodes of the season, Darabont recruited Charles H. Eglee, Adam Fierro and Glen Mazzara, all of whom he had worked with while directing an episode of The Shield. Jack LoGiudice also joined the writing team, along with Robert Kirkman, also an executive producer. "I have the best of both worlds", says Kirkman. "It was a lot of fun writing Episode 104, and I'm hoping if it continues into Season 2, I'll be able to write more episodes".

=== Filming ===
Principal photography for the pilot episode, "Days Gone Bye", began on May 15, 2010 with the subsequent five episodes beginning filming a few weeks later on June 2. The first season was filmed in and around Atlanta, Georgia where the episodes were primarily set.

== Cast ==
The primary characters of the first season include (from left to right): Amy, Shane, Glenn, Carl, Lori, Rick, Dale, and Andrea

=== Main cast ===
The first season features seven actors receiving opening credits billing:

- Andrew Lincoln as Rick Grimes, the series' protagonist and former sheriff's deputy from King County, Georgia, who awakens from a coma into the apocalypse. After becoming aware of the apocalypse, Rick sets out to find his wife, Lori, and son, Carl.
- Jon Bernthal as Shane Walsh, Rick's best friend since high school and former colleague, who helped Rick's family escape the apocalypse and is the leader of the Atlanta camp. Believing Rick to be dead, he also started a relationship with Lori, leading to complications when Rick unexpectedly returns alive and well.
- Sarah Wayne Callies as Lori Grimes, Rick's wife and mother of Carl. Lori is an emotionally fragile yet independent woman, who started a relationship with Shane out of her grief for losing Rick, leaving her off-guard and very conflicted when Rick returns.
- Laurie Holden as Andrea, a former successful civil rights attorney and sister of Amy. Andrea has a slight temper, but has a compassionate side and is very protective of her sister; both of them share a close bond with Dale.
- Jeffrey DeMunn as Dale Horvath, an elderly survivor, who owns the RV around which the survivors have formed a camp. Dale is a wise man of morals, who isn't afraid to voice his opinion and is very protective of everyone's well-being, physically and emotionally. He serves as an adviser to Shane, then to Rick. Dale also has a close bond with Andrea and Amy.
- Steven Yeun as Glenn Rhee, a former pizza delivery boy, who knows his way around Atlanta and often embarks on dangerous supply runs for the group. Glenn is a highly intelligent and resourceful, though slightly cocky yet hopeful individual, who cares for everyone; yet he is easily taken advantage of by the other group members. Rick trusts him on supply runs.
- Chandler Riggs as Carl Grimes, Rick and Lori's son. He and his mother are taken to Atlanta by Shane after the initial outbreak.

=== Supporting cast ===
- Emma Bell as Amy, Andrea's younger, childish and innocent sister; both have a close bond with Dale. Amy is shown to generally care for the children in the camp.
- Norman Reedus as Daryl Dixon, Merle's equally aggressive and volatile younger brother and hunter. Unlike Merle, however, Daryl is far more reasonable and willing to follow the group's lead.
- IronE Singleton as Theodore "T-Dog" Douglas, a fellow survivor in the Atlanta group. T-Dog is a man of honor and duty, who always tries to do what's right by people even if they don't deserve it or he doesn't like it, and is heavily burdened when he makes mistakes and always tries to make it right.
- Melissa McBride as Carol Peletier, Lori's best friend since the outbreak occurred and the mother of Sophia and the friendly yet soft-spoken wife of Ed.
- Jeryl Prescott Sales as Jacqui, a member of the group, who is the only survivor of her family and a former zoning office worker.
- Andrew Rothenberg as Jim, a mechanic and a quiet yet tortured member of the group, who saw his wife and children killed and eaten by walkers.
- Juan Pareja as Morales, another member of the group, who knows the city's infrastructure and puts his family first, and is also a fairly optimistic person.
- Madison Lintz as Sophia Peletier, Carol and Ed's quiet daughter, and Carl's best friend.
- Adam Minarovich as Ed Peletier, Carol's abusive husband and Sophia's father. He frequently has issues with Shane and is implicated to have also abused other women at the camp.
- Maddie Lomax as Eliza Morales, daughter of the aforementioned Morales and Miranda. She is the older sister of Louis.
- Viviana Chavez-Vega as Miranda Morales, wife of the aforementioned Morales and mother to Eliza and Louis.
- Noah Lomax as Louis Morales, son of the aforementioned Morales and Miranda. He is the younger brother of Eliza.
- Noah Emmerich as Dr. Edwin Jenner, a pathologist in the Atlanta CDC looking for any kind of cure.

=== Guest cast ===
- Lennie James as Morgan Jones, Duane's father, Jenny's husband and the first survivor that Rick encounters.
- Michael Rooker as Merle Dixon, former military and drug dealer and Daryl's racist, volatile and unreasonable older brother, who is also a hunter. His volatile tendencies often put him at odds with the group.
- Jim R. Coleman as Lambert Kendal, a police officer, who works with both Rick and Shane.
- Linds Edwards as Leon Basset, a somewhat inexperienced police officer, who works with both Rick and Shane.
- Keisha Tillis as Jenny Jones, Morgan's wife and Duane's mother.
- Adrian Kali Turner as Duane Jones, Morgan and Jenny's son.
- Noel G. as Felipe, a member of Guillermo's gang, the cousin of Miguel and the grandson of "Abuela".
- Neil Brown Jr. as Guillermo, the leader of a Vatos group in Atlanta taking care of a hospital.
- Anthony Guajardo as Miguel, a teenage member of Guillermo's gang, Felipe's cousin and "Abuela's" grandson.
- Gina Morelli as "Abuela", Felipe and Miguel's grandmother.
- James Gonzaba as Jorge, a member of Guillermo's gang.

The series features several actors Walking Dead developer Frank Darabont has worked with previously, including Laurie Holden, Jeffrey DeMunn, Melissa McBride and Juan Pareja. All four appeared in his 2007 film The Mist, along with Samuel Witwer, who appeared as a dying soldier, and with Thomas Jane, who originally was set to star in the series when it was pitched to HBO. He was wanted to be Rick Grimes. He was also in talks with Darabont to possibly guest star on the series. Laurie Holden also appeared in the 2001 film The Majestic (she played Adele Stanton, Jim Carrey's love interest), which Darabont directed. DeMunn has additionally appeared in several of Darabont's films, in addition to The Mist and The Majestic: The Shawshank Redemption (1994) and The Green Mile (1999).

== Promotion ==
The show's official website released a motion comic based on the first issue of the original comic and voiced by Phil LaMarr. The site also posted a making-of documentary primarily about the first episode, as well as a number of other behind-the-scenes videos and interviews. In the documentary, comic series creator and show executive producer Robert Kirkman as well as artist Charlie Adlard expressed that they were pleased with how faithful the show is to the comic and remark on the similarities between the actors and the comic's original character drawings. Several scenes from "Days Gone Bye" were screened July 23, 2010 as part of the 2010 San Diego Comic-Con. Hurd asserted that "[they] really are doing six one-hour movie", and Darabont insisted that the series would closely reflect the development in the comics. "The path is a very strong template. But we're going to take every interesting detour we feel like taking. As long as were staying on the path of what Robert has done, I don't see any reason not to. If they have patience we'll eventually catch up to what Robert is doing".

The Walking Dead debuted during the same week in 120 countries. "Days Gone Bye" premiered in Hong Kong on TVB Pearl on August 30, 2011, while it expanded in international markets during the first week of November. Two weeks prior to its official premiere in the United States, the contents of the episode leaked online. As part of an expansive campaign to advertise and heighten anticipation for the premiere, international broadcasting affiliates of AMC and Fox coordinated a worldwide zombie invasion event proceeding days prior to premiere of the episode in the United States. The event occurred in twenty six cities worldwide, and were hosted in select locations including the Brooklyn Bridge in New York City, Lincoln Memorial in Washington, D.C., Palace of Westminster in London, Bosphorus Bridge in Istanbul, Acropolis of Athens in Athens, and the Museo del Prado in Madrid. The campaign events commenced in Hong Kong and Taipei, and culminated in Los Angeles.

The Walking Dead was included on the cover of the December 2010 edition of Entertainment Weekly, which featured Rick Grimes pointing a gun at a horde of walkers. According to the journalist of the magazine, it "examines the past, present, and future" of the television franchise; "from the comic book's humble beginnings, to unlikely path to the small screen, to even more unlikely path as a bona fide hit". Kirkman was ecstatic upon hearing of the news. "I've got to say—not to kiss your magazine's a– or anything—but when they called me and said Frank [Darabont] wanted to do the show, I was like, 'Yeah, I'll believe it when I see it.' And then when AMC was like, 'We're picking up the show,' I was like, 'Yeah, alright, whatever.' When they actually started shooting the pilot I was like, 'Well, this is kind of real, this is neat.' But when they called me and said, 'Your show's on the cover of Entertainment Weekly,' I think that was the first time I was like, 'Oh my god, I can't believe this is happening to me!'"

== Episodes ==
No. overall	No. in season	Title	Directed by	Written by	Original release date	U.S. viewers (millions)
1	1	"Days Gone Bye"	Frank Darabont	Teleplay by : Frank Darabont	October 31, 2010	5.35
Sheriff's Deputy Rick Grimes is shot on duty and enters a coma, awakening to a post-apocalyptic world. He meets survivor Morgan Jones and his son Duane, who explain the pandemic that changed people into undead monsters they call "walkers." Morgan's wife, Jenny, was bitten and resurrected but Morgan let her go. Rick cleans out the firearms cage at the police station and sets out with a gun bag. He gifts Morgan a rifle to put down Jenny, but Morgan can't gather the strength. Rick departs for a safezone in Atlanta to find his wife Lori and son Carl, unaware that they are safe with his partner and best friend Shane. Rick finds Atlanta filled with walkers and gets trapped inside a tank. Alone and losing hope, Rick hears a voice on the radio.
2	2	"Guts"	Michelle MacLaren	Frank Darabont	November 7, 2010	4.71
Shane leads a camp outside Atlanta and, believing Rick to be dead, has entered a relationship with Lori. Meanwhile, Rick is rescued by Glenn, the man on the radio. Rick meets Glenn's entrapped group, including Andrea, Merle, and T-Dog. When Merle jeopardizes the group's safety, Rick restrains him and masterminds an escape. He and Glenn pose as walkers, safely wade through the horde in the street, and return to rescue the group. In the chaos, Merle and the gun bag are abandoned.
3	3	"Tell It to the Frogs"	Gwyneth Horder-Payton	Story by : Charles H. Eglee & Jack LoGiudice; Teleplay by : Charles H. Eglee & Jack LoGiudice and Frank Darabont	November 14, 2010	5.07
Trapped on the rooftop, Merle begins losing his sanity. Rick and the others arrive at Shane's camp, where he reunites with Lori and Carl and meets the other survivors, including Dale, Jim, and Carol. Lori warns Shane to avoid her and Carl, believing that he lied about Rick's death to take his place. Angry, Shane brutally beats Ed, Carol's abusive husband. Rick feels guilty and leads Glenn and Merle's younger brother Daryl back to Atlanta on a rescue mission. They discover a bloody saw and Merle's severed hand.
4	4	"Vatos"	Johan Renck	Robert Kirkman	November 21, 2010	4.75
Inspired by a forgotten dream, Jim digs dozens of graves. In Atlanta, Daryl finds evidence that Merle cauterized his wound and fled. Meanwhile, Glenn is captured by a Latino gang. After a shootout nearly ensues, Rick learns that the gang is protecting seniors in a nursing home and gifts them several weapons. Jim reveals that walkers ate his family. That night, walkers attack the camp. Rick, Daryl, and Glenn return and kill them, but are too late to prevent losses, including Andrea's sister Amy. Jim remembers his dream.
5	5	"Wildfire"	Ernest Dickerson	Glen Mazzara	November 28, 2010	5.56
After burying their dead, Shane blames Rick for leaving the camp vulnerable to attack. Jim reveals that he was bitten, spreading panic within the group. Rick proposes moving to the CDC, hopeful of a cure, but Shane is opposed. While they debate privately in the woods, Shane considers shooting Rick, but thinks better of it and conforms to Rick's plan. They leave Jim, who wants to join his family as a walker, and arrive at the CDC. Rick pleads for help and the door opens.
6	6	"TS-19"	Guy Ferland	Adam Fierro and Frank Darabont	December 5, 2010	5.97
In a flashback, Shane genuinely attempts to rescue Rick from the hospital but mistakenly presumes him dead and flees. In the present, Shane gets drunk and tries to explain this to Lori, but sexually assaults her when she resists. The group enters the CDC and meet Dr. Edwin Jenner, the only scientist left. Jenner reveals the brain scan of an infected patient, dubbed TS-19, showing the disease to be incurable. Jenner locks the group inside and reveals that the building will self-detonate. After losing his wife, the subject of the brain scan, Jenner nihilistically believes that suicide is best. Rick learns a secret from Jenner and persuades him to let them escape. Andrea and Jacqui stay behind but Dale convinces Andrea to leave with him. Jenner and Jacqui await a painless death while Rick leads the group on.

== Reception ==
=== Critical response ===
The first season of The Walking Dead received mostly positive reviews from critics. On Metacritic, the season holds a score of 82 out of 100, indicating "universal acclaim", based on 25 critics. On Rotten Tomatoes, the season holds an 87% with an average rating of 7.35 out of 10 based on 101 reviews. The site's critical consensus reads: "Blood-spattered, emotionally resonant, and white-knuckle intense, The Walking Dead puts an intelligent spin on the overcrowded zombie subgenre." Following the pilot episode's debut, TV Guide's Matt Roush called the show "a stark and harrowing survival parable ... visually stunning ... and daring in its artful use of silence." Following the second episode, Simon Abrams from Slant Magazine awarded the show three and a half stars out of a possible four; "To say that Darabont has kicked his series off with a bang would be a serious understatement ... [he] has fashioned a fully realized alternate reality and it's a thrilling thing to experience."

In response to the season finale, James Poniewozik of TIME magazine gave the first season of The Walking Dead a glowing review stating, "the show has an urgency and bravery that make it something special". Josh Jackson of Paste magazine also praised the season by writing, "the characters are worth caring about" despite "occasional stilted monologues, quick tempers and unfortunate stereotypes". Some reviews were mixed, including one from Kofi Outlaw of Screen Rant who concluded, "The Walking Dead still hasn't really defined itself as anything more than a vague survival story about the human condition" but added, "you can be sure I'm one of those Dead-heads already chomping at the bit for season 2". Sean McKenna of TV Fanatic also offered mixed criticism saying the first season "had its ups and downs" noting that the second season should focus on "a more specific story arc and strengthening of the character development". Logan Hill of New York magazine was more critical, claiming the episodes contained "atrocious dialogue" and "a lot of plot machinery that has been contrived to create action suspense but ... hasn't really moved the story itself anywhere in particular", though he admits the fifth episode showed "flashes of promise".

The Walking Dead season 1: Critical reception by episode
Season 1 (2010): Percentage of positive critics' reviews tracked by the website Rotten Tomatoes

=== Accolades ===
The first season of The Walking Dead was named one of the Top 10 Television Programs in 2010 by the American Film Institute. The season was also nominated for Outstanding New Program at the 27th TCA Awards and Best New Series at the 63rd Writers Guild of America Awards. It was also nominated for Best Television Series – Drama at the 68th Golden Globe Awards and Best Drama Series at the 1st Critics' Choice Television Awards. For the 37th Saturn Awards, the season received six nominations, winning Best Television Presentation. The nominations were for Best Actor on Television (Andrew Lincoln), Best Actress on Television (Sarah Wayne Callies), Best Supporting Actor on Television (Steven Yeun), Best Supporting Actress on Television (Laurie Holden), and Best Guest Starring Role on Television (Noah Emmerich).

The pilot episode, "Days Gone Bye", received three Primetime Emmy Award nominations for the 63rd Primetime Creative Arts Emmy Awards, winning Outstanding Prosthetic Makeup for a Series, Miniseries, Movie, or Special, and received nominations for Outstanding Sound Editing for a Series and Outstanding Special Visual Effects. Frank Darabont was nominated for Outstanding Directorial Achievement in Dramatic Series for his work on "Days Gone Bye".

=== Ratings ===
The pilot received 5.3 million viewers, making it the most-watched series premiere episode of any AMC television series. The first-season finale received 6 million viewers, a season high; with 4 million viewers in the 18-49 demographic, making it the most watched basic cable series for the demographic. The first season had an average of 5.24 million viewers and a rating of 2.7 in the 18-49 demographic. In the United Kingdom, it premiered one week after it did in the United States, on November 5, 2010, on digital channel, FX. The premiere had 579,000 viewers, almost double for any other show on FX that week. The viewership dipped during the season then rose to 522,000 viewers for the final episode. The terrestrial premiere on Channel 5 on April 10, 2011, averaged 1.46 million viewers. Based on its ratings, the series was renewed for a second season on November 8, 2010.

Viewership and ratings per episode of The Walking Dead season 1
No.	Title	Air date	Rating/share (18–49)	Viewers (millions)
1	"Days Gone Bye"	October 31, 2010	2.7/7	5.35
2	"Guts"	November 7, 2010	2.5/7	4.71
3	"Tell It to the Frogs"	November 14, 2010	2.5/7	5.07
4	"Vatos"	November 21, 2010	2.4/6	4.75
5	"Wildfire"	November 28, 2010	2.8/7	5.56
6	"TS-19"	December 5, 2010	3.0/8	5.97

== Home media releases ==
The first season was released on DVD and Blu-ray in region 1 on March 8, 2011, and in region 2 on May 16, 2011. Special features on the sets include six featurettes—"The Making of The Walking Dead", "Inside The Walking Dead: Episode 1–6", "A Sneak Peek with Robert Kirkman", "Behind the Scenes Zombie Make-Up Tips", "Convention Panel with Producers" and "The Walking Dead Trailer". Also included are other behind the scenes featurettes—"Zombie School", "Bicycle Girl", "On Set with Robert Kirkman", "Hanging with Steven Yeun", "Inside Dale's RV" and "On Set with Andrew Lincoln".

A three-disc special edition of the first season was released on DVD and Blu-ray on October 4, 2011. The sets include all the previous special features, plus brand new extras. The new extras include audio commentary on all six episodes, the black and white version of the pilot, and six new featurettes—"We Are The Walking Dead", "Bring Out the Dead: KNB and the Art of Making Zombies", "Digital Decay: The VFX of The Walking Dead", "No More Room in Hell: The Walking Dead Phenomenon", "Adapting the Dead" and "Killer Conversations: Frank Darabont & Greg Nicotero". In addition to the DVD and Blu-ray release, a limited edition Blu-ray collector's tin contains an exclusive wearable zombie mask from the National Entertainment Collectibles Association designed by the series own make-up artist, Greg Nicotero.
