= TS-19 =

- The Walking Dead episode
- Dr. Edwin Jenner whispers something to Rick.
- Episode no.: Season 1 Episode 6
- Directed by: Guy Ferland
- Written by: Adam Fierro; Frank Darabont
- Cinematography by: David Boyd
- Editing by: Hunter M. Via
- Original air date: December 5, 2010

Guest appearances
- Norman Reedus as Daryl Dixon; Noah Emmerich as Dr. Edwin Jenner; Melissa McBride as Carol Peletier; Jeryl Prescott Sales as Jacqui; IronE Singleton as Theodore "T-Dog" Douglas; Madison Lintz as Sophia Peletier

Episode chronology
← Previous "Wildfire"	Next → "What Lies Ahead"
- The Walking Dead season 1

"TS-19" (Test Subject 19) is the sixth and final episode of the first season of the post-apocalyptic television series The Walking Dead. It originally aired on AMC in the United States on December 5, 2010. The episode was written by Adam Fierro and series creator Frank Darabont and directed by Guy Ferland. In the episode, the group finally finds safe haven in the Centers for Disease Control and Prevention (CDC) headquarters, although the only scientist there, Dr. Edwin Jenner (Noah Emmerich) hides many secrets that leads the group to demand answers about the zombie apocalypse.

Themes such as romance, rape, suicide and terror are prevalent throughout "TS-19". Different character developments occur throughout the episode, particularly with Shane Walsh (Jon Bernthal), who writer Robert Kirkman felt that viewers would no longer identify as the show's main antagonist. Production for "TS-19" commenced at the Cobb Energy Performing Arts Centre, as opposed to the actual headquarters for the Centers of Disease Control and Prevention, which was impractical due to the high security of the area.

"TS-19" received favorable reception from television commentators, who praised the development of various characters as well as the performances of several actors and actresses. Upon airing, it attained 5.97 million viewers and a 3.4 rating in the 18-49 demographic, according to the Nielsen Media Research. "TS-19" at one point was the show's highest-rated episode, and it is the highest-rated telecast in its first season.

== Plot ==
The episode opens with a flashback where Shane Walsh ensures that the still-unconscious Rick Grimes is secured within the hospital during the onset of the zombie apocalypse.

In the present, Rick's group has entered the CDC building in Atlanta with help from its sole remaining scientist, Dr. Edwin Jenner. Jenner makes them undertake a blood test to prove they are not infected. The group enjoys the luxuries of the facility, which is self-powered and still has running water, food, alcohol, and other amenities. Jenner admits he is the only researcher that stayed behind, many of the others having left for their families or died by suicide. A drunk Shane approaches Lori Grimes about her callous attitude towards him with Rick's return and attempts to rape her, but backs off when she scratches his neck.

Jenner later shows Rick's group what he had learned from Test Subject 19, who had been his wife but volunteered to be recorded after she was bitten in hopes of discovering a cure; the infection kills the carrier but causes the brain to re-activate and re-animate the body shortly thereafter, eliminating any conscious human traits. Jenner had been in communication with other facilities worldwide before they went silent, knowing the French had been close to a cure, but affirms that human civilization is ceasing to exist.

The group discovers that the generator's fuel reserves are near exhausted; when empty, the facility will enter a self-destruct mode by design to eradicate all the infectious diseases stored there. Jenner seals the building, refusing to allow Rick's group to leave, but promises that the high-impulse thermobaric weapon designed to destroy the facility will mean their deaths will be quick. Rick's group tries in vain to have Jenner open the doors, and Rick eventually convinces him to allow them to at least try to overcome the tragedy rather than be forced to die. Two of Rick's group, Jacqui and Andrea, choose to stay behind, but Dale Horvath refuses to leave without Andrea and stays as well. As Rick departs, Jenner whispers something to him. Shortly thereafter, Andrea has a change of heart, not wishing to see Dale die, and the two escape the building moments before its destruction. The surviving members return to their vehicles and set off away from the smoking husk of the CDC.

== Production ==
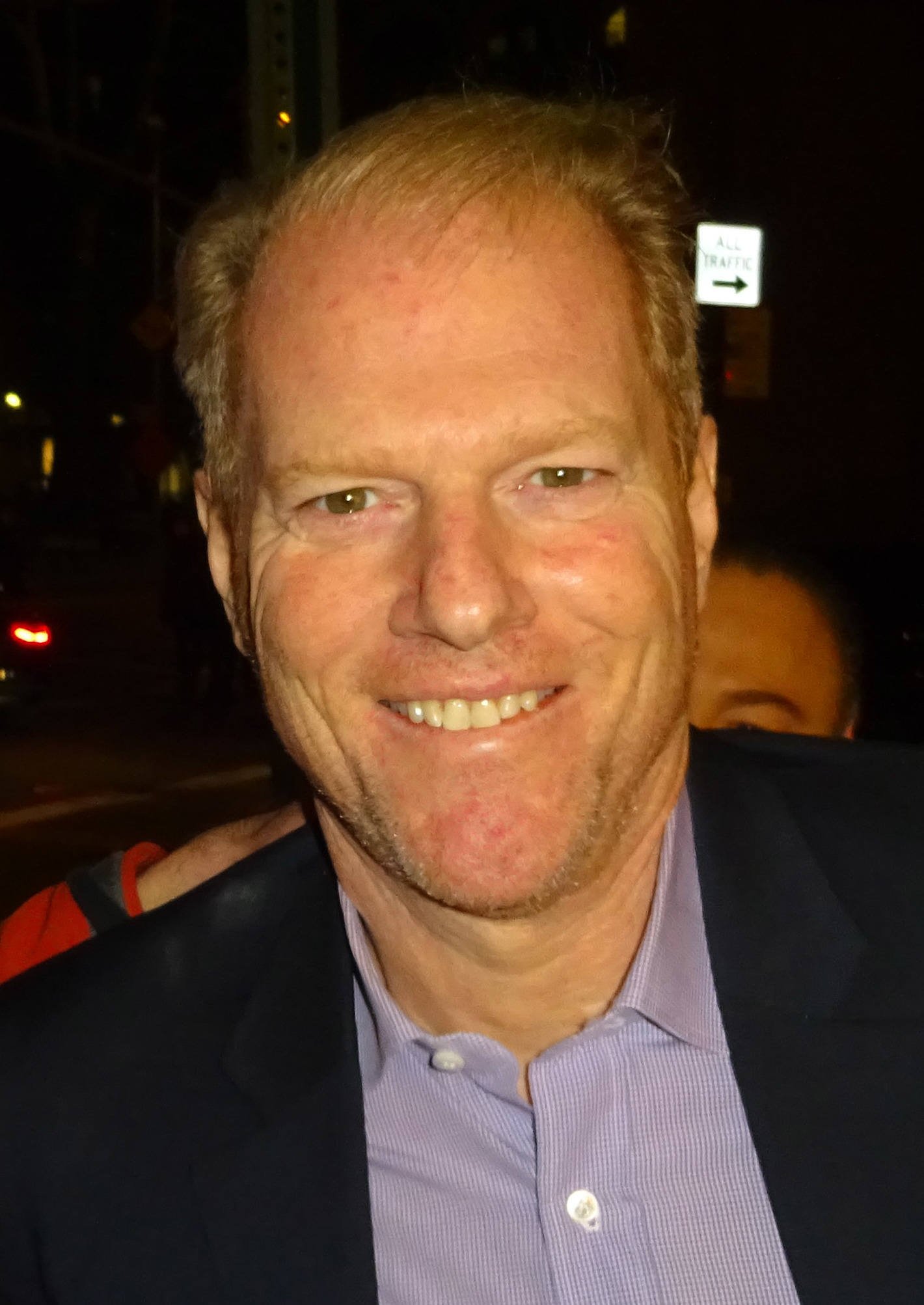
Noah Emmerich made a guest appearance in the episode as Dr. Edwin Jenner.

"TS-19" was directed by Guy Ferland and written by Frank Darabont and Adam Fierro. Actor Noah Emmerich made a guest appearance on the show, portraying the character of Edwin Jenner, one of the few remaining medical personnel dedicated to eradicating the virus. Emmerich's appearance was formally announced in November 2010. Darabont foreshadowed the development of the episode the same month, alongside predecessors "Vatos" and "Wildfire". "Before it's all said and done, the opinions and actions of the group are divided." Producer Gale Anne Hurd added, "Stakes are higher, dissension develops, rivalries intensify."

Principal photography for "TS-19" took place at the Cobb Energy Performing Arts Centre, which stood in for the Centers for Disease Control and Prevention. Producers of the show were not allowed to photograph the interior of the actual buildings as part of the Centers for Disease Control and Prevention as a point of reference due to its high security. Although the location was not featured in the comics of the same name, Hurd felt that it was important to add because of its close proximity to the survivor's camp. As opposed to the previous episode, where filming mostly took place outside of the Cobb Energy Performing Arts Centre, production for "TS-19" occurred inside of the building. Darabont conceived the idea of exploring the Centers for Disease Control and Prevention. "When Frank was pitching the idea to me, saying he wanted to bring them to the CDC and telling me all the different things that he felt would come out of that story, the science of it all and the being trapped in the small location, I was very much picturing a lot of Day of the Dead stuff," stated comic book creator Robert Kirkman. "That's one of the reasons I was so on board with the idea."

At the episode's conclusion, Jenner purposely calls for the self-destruction of the building, which ultimately explodes shortly thereafter. A plate was installed on set, which hovered over pyrotechnics. The plate was turned upside down to create an optical effect where the flame travels across the panel. This created an illusion that the explosion was expanding. The sequence was divided into six different cuts; the first one consisted of the rupture glass of the building, while the last frame concluded with the collapse of the Centers for Disease Control and Prevention.

While his group escapes from the Centers of Disease Control and Prevention, Jenner whispers to Rick about the virus that has caused the zombie apocalypse. Initially there was no indication as to what Jenner said to him; the dialogue was previously inserted into the episode's script but was later removed. "I'm so pleased they didn't reveal it," said Andrew Lincoln, "because it was scripted, and extremely powerful, and I said to everyone, 'Burn this page: No one should know apart from Rick and Frank.' It's brilliant that they left it [as a mystery]—it's perfect, it's so classy." Kirkman was content with the idea of teasing Jenner's revelation in lieu of blatantly revealing anything about the origins of the virus. "I thought it was a great addition. I'm very much opposed to showing what the actual cause [for the zombies] is and explaining how things work, but teasing a little bit is a great thing. If it adds an extra layer to the drama, then I'm all for it," he stated. "It also led up to the fantastic mystery of the whisper Jenner gives to Rick at the end of that scene. That's going to play into Season 2 quite a bit. I know where that's going and it's really a cool bit." It is not until the second season finale, "Beside the Dying Fire", that Rick reveals Jenner's message to the group.

In a 2014 interview with The Hollywood Reporter, Kirkman revealed that he regrets revealing that everyone in the new world is infected too soon, saying: "If I had to do it again, I wouldn't have done the CDC episode [at the end of season one]. It possibly gave away too much information and was such a big change very early on in the series."

=== Cast ===
Alongside the main cast, it was the last regular appearance of Jacqui, played by Jeryl Prescott, who died at the CDC with Dr. Edwin Jenner, played by Emmerich. Claire Bronson played Candace Jenner, who worked with Edwin Jenner at the CDC before being infected and killed. Barry Hopkins played a hospital patient. Joyce Liles, Ken Melde, M.V. Oliphant, Mike Senior and Lisa Marie Thomas played doctors and nurses.

== Themes and cultural references ==
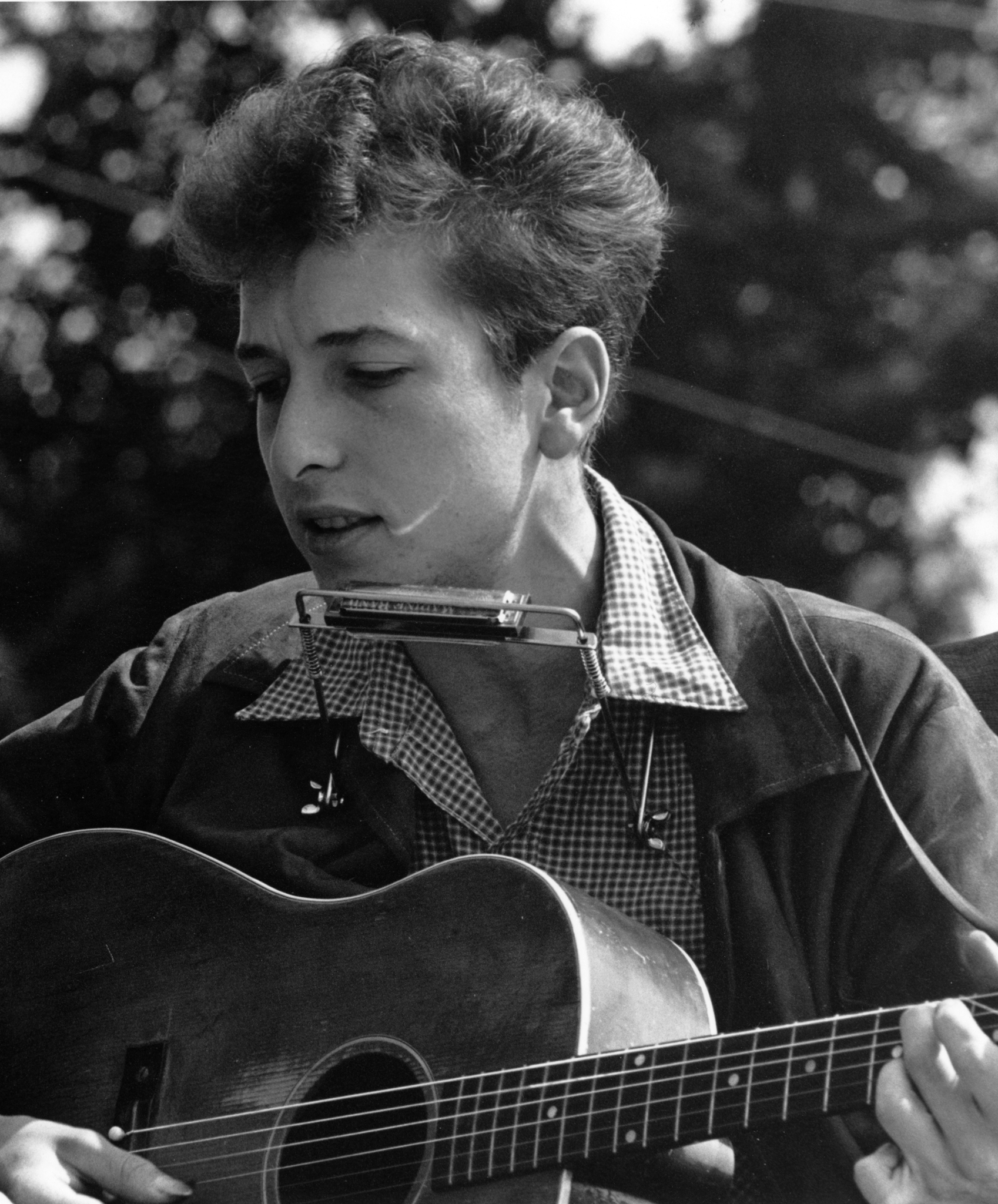
Near the end of the episode, Bob Dylan's "Tomorrow Is a Long Time" (1971) is heard in the background.

Ideas alluding to romance are prevalent throughout the episode. The development between Shane Walsh and Lori Grimes continues in "TS-19", which showcases a flashback featuring Shane being conflicted with the decision to leave an unconscious Rick Grimes in the hospital—who Shane initially presumes to be dead. Kirkman asserted that the sequence added dimension to the storyline, and concluded that by the ending of the episode, the audience will no longer identify Shane as an antagonist. "Up until the sixth episode, you get the sense that Shane actually is a bad guy, that he lied to Lori and made her believe that he was dead in order to facilitate him moving in on her," said Kirkman. "The flashback does a great job of telling you that that's not true: He tried to save Rick, he wanted to save Rick. He was kind of up against the wall there and actually did believe that Rick was dead." Lincoln said of the flashback: "You realize Shane's loyalty as a friend and as a man—and also his weaknesses. He still can't make a decision without his partner, and you realize he's flawed—everybody is under incredible duress, you see the state of the world is so extreme and terrifying that people are making split-second decisions under great duress. Is Shane barricading Rick in, or is he trying to prevent him being taken by the walkers? There are many different ways to construe what Shane has done and that's the beauty of the show is that there's no clear and definite answers, you make your own mind." Other themes prominent in the episode include suicide and terror.

The character progression of Shane is a focal point in "TS-19". After facing constant rejection from Lori through much of the previous three episodes, he has become more agitated and impatient with her. According to Kirkman, it was important to integrate dimension to the character so that viewers "can see later in the episode, when [Shane] is losing it and actually getting somewhat violent with Lori, the transition he's gone through and how this world has changed him from being a loving, easygoing guy into this guy who is slowly devolving into a bit of a maniac."

The show features various references relating to music, media, film, and other pop cultural phenomena. Character Dr. Edwin Jenner was modeled after the English physician Edward Jenner, a pioneer in the eradication of smallpox. The episode title is an acronym for Test Subject 19, a patient that was examined by Jenner for clinical research. As "TS-19" comes to a close, one can hear the song "Tomorrow Is a Long Time" (1971) by American singer-songwriter Bob Dylan play in the background. The Washington Post's Liz Kelly suggested that it could have referred to the seemingly long hiatus that proceeded after the season finale. Jenner later reveals to the group that the symptoms of the walker virus are evocative to that of meningitis. As Rick desperately tries to break out of a nearly incinerating Centers for Disease Control and Prevention building, Carol hands him a grenade, which was the same grenade that Rick had found in a tank in the series premiere, "Days Gone Bye". The opening and concluding scenes of "TS-19" are reminiscent of the American television series Lost.

== Reception ==
=== Ratings ===
"TS-19" was originally broadcast on December 5, 2010 in the United States on AMC. Upon initial airing, the episode amassed 5.97 million viewers and a 4.1 household rating, indicating that 4.1% of households that watched television viewed the episode. Following two encore presentations, total viewership accumulated to 8.1 million. At the time of its airing, "TS-19" was the highest-rated cable television series of all time demographically; it attained a 3.4 rating in the 18-49 demographic, denoting 4 million viewers, while simultaneous acquiring 3.5 million viewers in the 25–54 demographic according to Nielsen Media Research. The accolade was then succeeded by three episodes of The Walking Dead: the episode's ratings were beaten by second season premiere "What Lies Ahead", followed by "Nebraska", and lastly the second season finale "Beside the Dying Fire", of which the last aforementioned currently holds the record. "TS-19" became the most-viewed cable telecast of the day, obtaining significantly higher ratings than installments of Hannah Montana and Shake It Up on Disney Channel. Ratings and total viewership moderately increased from the previous installment, "Wildfire", which received 5.56 million viewers and a 2.8 rating in the 18-49 demographic. In the United Kingdom, "TS-19" garnered 492,000 viewers, subsequently becoming the most-viewed television series of the week on FX.

=== Critical response ===
"TS-19" garnered favorable reviews from most television critics. In his 8.5 out of 10 rating review, Eric Goldman of IGN wrote that the episode was an exceptional showing for the series, adding that it told "a compelling, intense story within its hour" albeit averting from the comics. As Michelle Kung of The Wall Street Journal wrote, "The first season of The Walking Dead doesn’t exactly end on an optimistic note, but our heroes are left driving into the unknown after escaping certain death at the CDC." Kurt Christenson of New York Daily News analyzed that "almost and everyone's still kind of in the dark", and Kelly stated that "TS-19" came to an "abrupt, explosive end". Salon journalist Simon Abrams concluded that the frenetic pace of The Walking Dead was relatable, while Paste television commentator Josh Jackson was keen of the character development in the episode as well as the varying political themes covered; "After six episodes, the characters are worth caring about. Despite occasional stilted monologues, quick tempers and unfortunate stereotypes, the few living souls in The Walking Dead are a bigger draw than the undead. The show has spent more time on topics like marriage, parenthood, unfaithfulness, loss, domestic violence, gender roles, small-scale politics, loyalty, kindness than it has with kill shots. By filling the world with zombies, Frank Darabont is able to explore the human condition under extreme circumstances." Entertainment Weekly writer Dan Snierson was entertained by "TS-19", and asserted that the conclusion "resonated over images of Rick & Co. U-turning into the great unknown, we got the sense that as long as they were alive, at least there was a chance of a tomorrow." Writing for the same publication, Jeff Jensen was intrigued at how producers approached the themes of the comics, and later noted that it was proof that they were using the comics as a route for thematic inspiration in lieu of a literal interpretation. For Los Angeles Times' Gina McIntyre, "Tonight's finale [...] did yield much insight, though, into the nature of the plague itself, in relative terms anyway."

Most of these complaints stem from the length of the season and the fact that we're already at the end of the road. With a few more episodes, we could have had a fully satisfying finish; as it stands, we were treated to an excellent episode, but not one that felt like a thorough wrap-up.

— Josh Wigler

Some commentators were less enthusiastic about the episode than the general consensus. Although Josh Wigler of MTV declared "TS-19" a "compelling hour", he professed that it was lacking for a season finale. "While there was a massive fireball and a decent amount of zombie action," explained Wigler, "not to mention some concrete information regarding the outbreak, there are still several plot threads that haven't come close to resolution." Vanity Fair's Mike Ryan argued that in contrast to a "great season", the episode was a mediocre conclusion to The Walking Dead's first season, writing that "this might have been the silliest hour of television that I've ever watched". Leonard Pierce of The A.V. Club issued "TS-19" a B− grade: despite proclaiming that "there was some good stuff" in the episode, Pierce opined that it fell below his expectations. He denounced many scenes in the episode—notably the explosion sequence—as he felt it was a waste of cinematography. "The fact that almost all the scenes played out in dark, closed quarters wasted The Walking Dead's gorgeous cinematography; the pacing was again off beat, with far too much padded scenes of people looking at one another in shock; and, though I'm usually not bothered by plot contrivances, there's no way anyone in a vehicle that close to such a huge explosion would have lived through it." Writing for Cinema Blend, Nick Venable said that it was an interesting episode, although it could have been executed in a better manner.

The character progression of several characters and the performances of various actors were lauded by critics. Wigler noted that Bernthal, Holden, and DeMunn delivered "brilliant character work", a view that was echoed by Pierce in regards to Emmerich's performance; "He has a nervous intensity that grounded every scene he was in, which this show needs." Similarly, Alan Sepinwall of HitFix described Emmerich's acting as "haunting", and ultimately cited the performances of Lincoln, Holden, and DeMunn as episode highlights. Ryan affirmed that character development remained one of the series' strongest points.

== Deleted scene ==
In a scene deleted from the television series, after Rick's group flees the CDC they return to the Atlanta nursing home they first visited in "Vatos", only to find the residents and their protectors have been killed execution-style and their supplies ransacked.
