= Wildfire (The Walking Dead) =

- The Walking Dead episode
- The CDC door opens with a glow of light, allowing the survivors to enter the premises.
- Episode no.: Season 1 Episode 5
- Directed by: Ernest Dickerson
- Written by: Glen Mazzara
- Cinematography by: David Boyd
- Editing by: Julius Ramsay
- Original air date: November 28, 2010

Guest appearances
- Norman Reedus as Daryl Dixon; Emma Bell as Amy; Andrew Rothenberg as Jim; Juan Pareja as Morales; Noah Emmerich as Dr. Edwin Jenner; Melissa McBride as Carol Peletier; Jeryl Prescott Sales as Jacqui; IronE Singleton as Theodore "T-Dog" Douglas; Adam Minarovich as Ed Peletier; Madison Lintz as Sophia Peletier; Maddie Lomax as Eliza Morales; Viviana Chavez-Vega as Miranda Morales

Episode chronology
← Previous "Vatos"	Next → "TS-19"
- The Walking Dead season 1

"Wildfire" is the fifth and penultimate episode of the first season of the post-apocalyptic horror television series The Walking Dead. It originally aired on AMC in the United States on November 28, 2010. The episode was written by Glen Mazzara and directed by Ernest Dickerson.

In the episode, the survivors deal with the aftermath of the walker attack, and decide to move to the Centers for Disease Control and Prevention facilities, hoping to find a cure for an infected Jim (Andrew Rothenberg). Meanwhile, Shane Walsh (Jon Bernthal), finding his leadership position challenged by Rick Grimes (Andrew Lincoln), succumbs to his inner demons.

== Plot ==
The survivors deal with the aftermath of the zombie attack, burying their dead and burning the bodies of the zombies. Andrea stays with the body of Amy, apologizing for not spending more time with her, before the body starts to re-animate and she shoots it in the head. As they reassess their situation, Jim reveals he was bitten in the attack, and while Daryl Dixon wants to kill him before he turns, Rick Grimes stops him, telling him they don't kill the living. Daryl points out the hypocrisy after Rick points a gun at him.

Fearing the camp is no longer safe, Rick suggests the group travel to the CDC facility in Druid Hills, Georgia where they may have a cure. Shane does not believe it is safe, and tries to convince Lori, Rick's wife, to change Rick's mind, but she refuses. Shane, still resenting Rick's reappearance disrupting his relationship with Lori, attempts to shoot Rick but stops when Dale spots him. The camp packs up, with Rick radioing Morgan Jones that Atlanta is not safe. Morales and his family elect to go on their own towards Birmingham, and Rick gives them some of the weapons and supplies. The remainder of the survivors heads to the CDC. En route, as they fix Dale's RV, Jim starts to feel as if he is about to turn and asks to be left behind; the group leaves him under a tree by the road.

At the CDC, a lone scientist, Edwin Jenner, is sampling tissue that is part of the "Wildfire" epidemic that has lasted for over 190 days. During one test, his biohazard protection suit is damaged, and he quickly takes emergency precautions, which destroy the remaining samples he has to study. With no further means to proceed, Jenner contemplates suicide when he sees Rick's group appear outside the sealed building. Rick sees surveillance cameras watching them, and demands they be let in before an approaching horde of zombies reach them. Jenner triggers the external doors, allowing Rick's group in to safety.

== Production ==
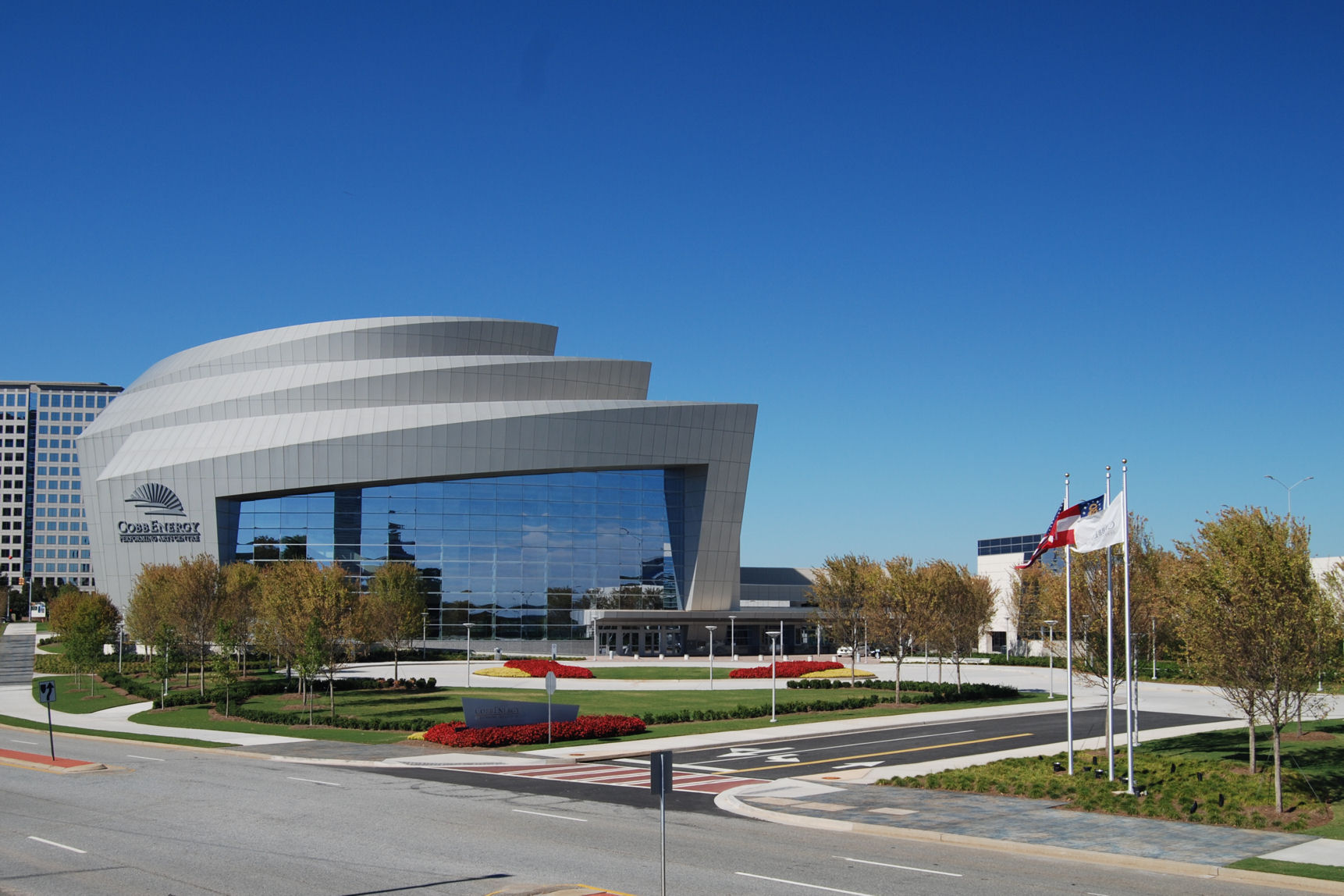
Filming for "Wildfire" commenced at the Cobb Energy Performing Arts Centre.

"Wildfire" was directed by Ernest Dickerson and written by Glen Mazzara. Actor Noah Emmerich made a guest appearance on the show, portraying the character of Edwin Jenner, one of the few remaining medical personnel dedicated to eradicating the virus. Emmerich's appearance was formally announced in November 2010. Creator Frank Darabont foreshadowed the development of the episode the same month, alongside predecessor "Vatos" and the first-season finale, "TS-19". "Before it's all said and done, the opinions and actions of the group are divided." Producer Gale Anne Hurd added, "Stakes are higher, dissension develops, rivalries intensify."

Principal photography for "Wildfire" transpired at the Cobb Energy Performing Arts Centre, which was depicted as the Centers for Disease Control and Prevention. Producers of the show were not allowed to photograph the interior of the actual buildings as part of the Centers for Disease Control and Prevention as a point of reference due to its high security. As opposed to the successive episode, where filming mostly took place inside of the Cobb Energy Performing Arts Centre, production for "Wildfire" occurred outside of the building. Darabont conceived the idea of exploring into the Centers for Disease Control and Prevention, as its headquarters are in close proximity to Atlanta. Although the location was not featured in the comics of the same name, Kirkman was content with the idea, and stated that Darabont was looking to diverge from the comics in lieu of a literal interpretation. "Frank has always maintained that the comic book is a path but we’re not stuck on it. If a story idea comes up, we’ll leave the path for an episode or two, but we’ll always come back to it," he said.

It was honestly one of my favorite scenes of the show so far. Glen Mazzara, who wrote that episode, did an amazing job hyping the tension up. Laurie Holden did a great job and then Emma doing her zombie transformation—it was really cool.

— Robert Kirkman

In "Wildfire", Andrea shoots her deceased sister Amy after she slowly resurrected into a walker. Greg Nicotero, the special effect director for The Walking Dead, made Bell wear contact lenses that were less harsh in appearance, as he wanted an emotional connection to resonate between the characters. Bell admitted that she was perplexed on how to approach the scene. "I laid down on the wood chips and just sort of stared at the sky and staring at my sister's face," explained Bell. "All of these thoughts and emotions started flooding in, so I was really lucky." Jim, played by Andrew Rothenberg, also died in this episode, bitten by a walker, and is abandoned. His death is considered the 35th most important death in the series. Adam Minarovich played Ed, Carol's husband and first victim of the series. It is the last appearance of Morales, played by Juan Pareja, and his family (Maddie Lomax and Noah Lomax as Eliza and Louis Morales, his children, and Viviana Chavez as Miranda Morales, his spouse), until his return in the season 8 episode 2 named The Damned.

Bear McCreary composed fewer scores in "Wildfire" in comparison to other episode of the series, putting an emphasis on silence, which McCreary felt that the music was more subtle when corresponding with silence. He found that as a result, the music was more effective because he was not adding sound "for the sake of being heard". "When you don't have ambient beds going through your whole score," he said, "it means that just the entrance of music has a lot more power. We really pushed the limits of how long can we go without music."

== Themes and cultural references ==
Ideas relating to guilt recur throughout the episode. Proclaiming "Wildfire" as an installment "full of guilt trips", Dan Snierson of Entertainment Weekly explained that Rick Grimes and Andrea epitomized such themes given their situations. "Andrea feels guilty about 'not being there' for Amy—but is motivated towards a mercy. Shane made Rick feel bad for not being at the camp when the zombies attacked, and Lori didn't do much to make her husband feel better," Snierson stated. "She also told Rick she needs more 'certainties' from him than decisions made from hunch and instinct." A columnist for the same publication, Jeff Jensen stated that "Wildfire" was a commentary on humanity, and added that the episode demonstrated "the need for the group to honor the departed" so they could identify with their humanity.

The title of the episode is an homage to Michael Crichton's The Andromeda Strain, which also involves studying a pathogen in an underground laboratory.

== Reception ==
=== Critical response ===
Leonard Pierce of The A.V. Club gave it a grade of A− on a F to A scale, calling the episode "a very good one, gripping as hell and maybe my favorite episode of the season so far." He also complimented the directing of Ernest Dickerson, saying he "provided some fantastic shot set-ups and used the 16mm camera better than anyone has so far." Overall, he commented, "The episode provided a lot of emotional drama, and while it was somewhat light on zombie action, it did deliver a huge rush of action thrills at the end. It's stripping down the characters to the point where their relationships are becoming more meaningful, and it's introduced a real wild card at just the right time." Eric Goldman of IGN rated the episode 8 out of 10.

=== Ratings ===
Upon its initial broadcast on November 28, 2010, "Wildfire" was watched by 5.56 million viewers, which increased in viewership from the previous episode. At the time, it was the highest-rated episode of the series in both overall viewership and in the 18-49 demographic.
