= Days Gone Bye (The Walking Dead) =

- The Walking Dead episode
- Rick Grimes arrives in Atlanta, Georgia
- Episode no.: Season 1 Episode 1
- Directed by: Frank Darabont
- Teleplay by: Frank Darabont
- Cinematography by: David Tattersall
- Editing by: Hunter M. Via
- Original air date: October 31, 2010
- Running time: 67 minutes

Guest appearances
- Lennie James as Morgan Jones; Emma Bell as Amy; Jim Coleman as Lambert Kendal; Linds Edwards as Leon Bassett; Keisha Tillis as Jenny Jones; Adrian Kali Turner as Duane Jones

Episode chronology
← Previous —	Next → "Guts"
- The Walking Dead season 1

"Days Gone Bye" (titled "Pilot" on DVD and Blu-ray releases) is the pilot episode of the post-apocalyptic horror television series The Walking Dead. It originally aired on AMC in the United States on October 31, 2010. The episode's teleplay was written and directed by Frank Darabont.

Robert Kirkman, creator of The Walking Dead comic books, had considered the idea of creating a television show based on the comic series, but did not move forward. Darabont expressed interest in developing the series for television. In January 2010, AMC formally announced that it had ordered a pilot for a possible series adapted from The Walking Dead comic book. In the announcement, the executives stated that Darabont would serve as writer, director, and an executive producer alongside Gale Anne Hurd.

Principal photography for the pilot commenced in May 2010 in Atlanta, Georgia. It was wholly shot on 16 mm film and edited using computer-generated imagery. "Days Gone Bye" was heavily promoted in the months preceding its release; as part of an expansive advertising campaign, zombie invasion events were coordinated in selected locations including New York City, Washington, D.C., London, and Madrid. The episode premiered in 120 countries worldwide.

"Days Gone Bye" was critically well received, praising Andrew Lincoln's performance and Darabont's direction. Several critics compared it to Lost. In the United States, the episode achieved a viewership of 5.35 million, making it the most-watched series premiere in AMC history. The episode garnered a Nielsen rating of 2.7 in the 18–49 demographic, translating to 3.6 million viewers.

== Plot ==
The episode opens in medias res as former Sheriff's Deputy Rick Grimes (Andrew Lincoln) scavenges for gas and supplies at an abandoned convenience store on a deserted highway in rural Georgia. He spots a little girl (Addy Miller) holding a teddy bear as he assures her, not to be afraid of him, but she turns out to be a zombie. When she shambles towards him, Rick shoots her in the head.

Returning to several weeks prior, Rick is seriously injured while chasing down criminals alongside his partner and childhood friend Shane Walsh (Jon Bernthal); he is shot in the side and goes into a coma. Hospitalized after the injury, Rick experiences a series of dreamlike encounters with friends and family.

When he regains consciousness, he finds the hospital abandoned and horrifically ransacked: the walls are sprayed with blood, destroyed equipment is everywhere, and dead bodies litter the hallway. He walks past a set of double doors secured with heavy chains and spray-painted with the ominous warning "Don't Open Dead Inside". From the far side of the secured doors, Rick hears growling while an unknown menace pushes against the locked doors. Outside, he finds scores of dead bodies, some covered in makeshift body bags, others strewn about randomly. As he makes his way home, he sees a zombified woman dragging her legless body towards him. He ignores her and returns home, but his family has fled.

Rick encounters Morgan Jones (Lennie James) and his son Duane (Adrian Kali Turner), and they explain the zombie apocalypse that occurred while Rick was in a coma. Morgan warns that the only way to stop the zombies is to destroy the brain, and cautions that the zombies are attracted to noise. Rick decides to head to Atlanta where a refugee camp is rumored to exist, though Morgan would rather stay behind. Rick, Morgan, and Duane go to the Sheriff's Department headquarters where Rick was assigned and take weapons, radios, ammunition and a patrol car. While there, Rick encounters a zombified former colleague whom he shoots in the head. Rick splits the stash of weapons and supplies from the police station with Morgan and promises to stay in touch with a walkie-talkie. Morgan and Duane return to their home where Morgan, armed with a sniper rifle and perched in a second-story window, shoots at the zombies wandering in the street below. While Duane sits nervously downstairs, unsure why Morgan is shooting out the window, it becomes clear that Morgan is trying to attract his zombified wife. When she appears, Morgan gets her head in sight but is unable to shoot her.

On his way out of town, Rick stops by the legless zombie. He apologizes for what had happened to her then shoots her. Continuing toward Atlanta in the police car, Rick radios for help on an emergency channel; his signal is picked up at the survivors' camp where Shane, Rick's wife Lori (Sarah Wayne Callies), and their son Carl (Chandler Riggs) are safe. Unaware that it is Rick on the radio, the survivors lose the signal and can't warn him of the dangers in Atlanta. Shane and Lori kiss, but are interrupted by Carl. Later, Rick abandons his car when it runs out of gas, then finds a nearby farmhouse and its dead owners. He takes their horse and continues toward Atlanta on horseback. In the seemingly empty city, Rick follows a helicopter flying overhead right into a horde of zombies. They attack, killing his horse and forcing him to drop his bag of weapons and crawl under a tank, and as they follow him under it Rick contemplates suicide before noticing a trapdoor in the bottom of the vehicle. After he shoots a walker inside, he hears a voice from the tank's radio sarcastically ask if he is comfortable, before the scene exits with a top-down view of Atlanta overrun by walkers.

== Production ==
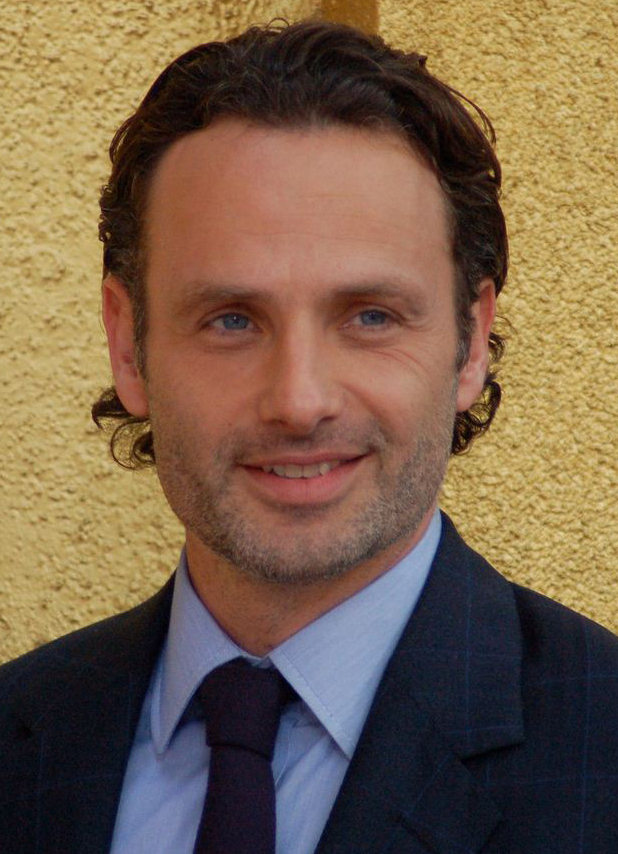
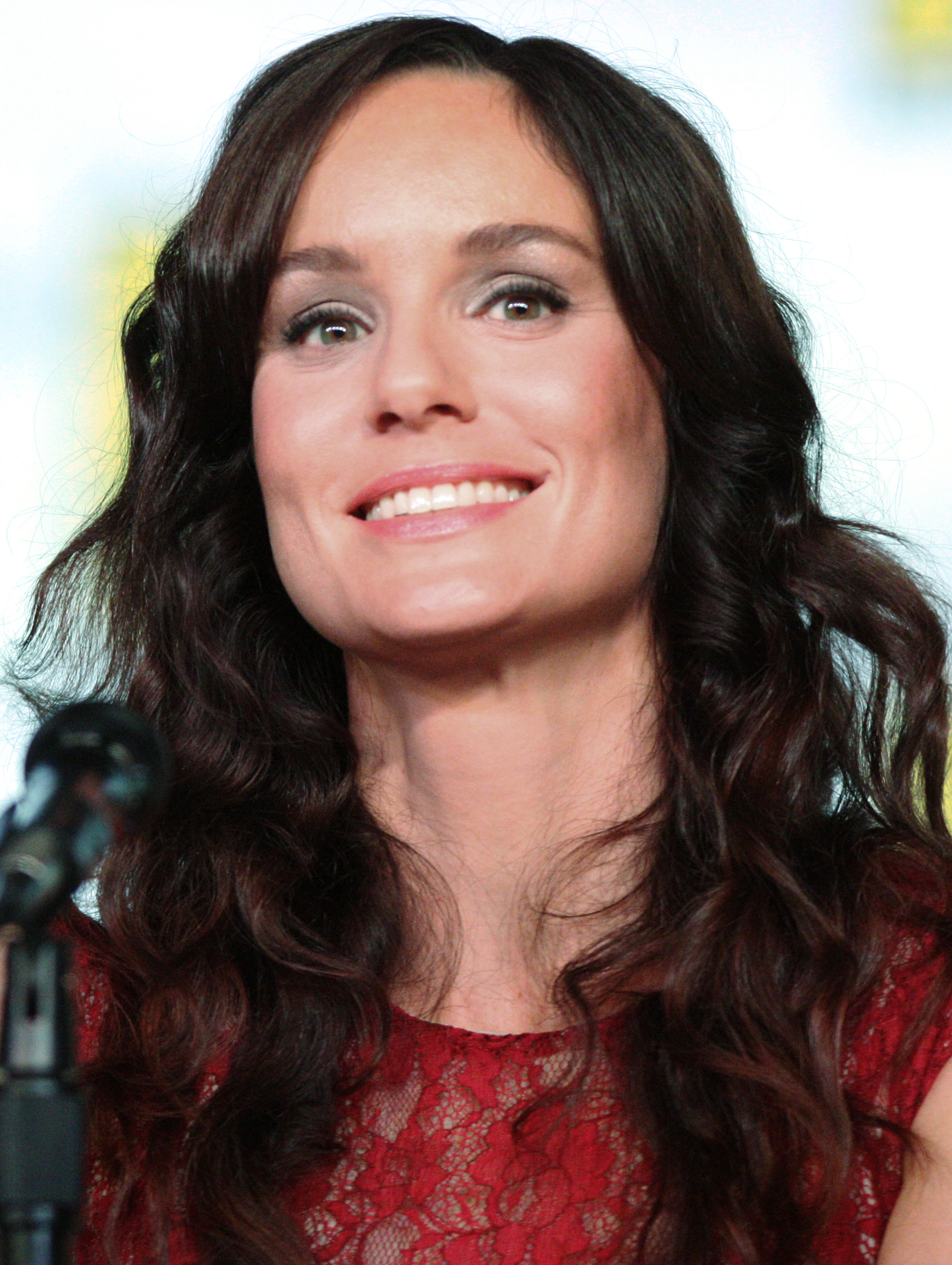
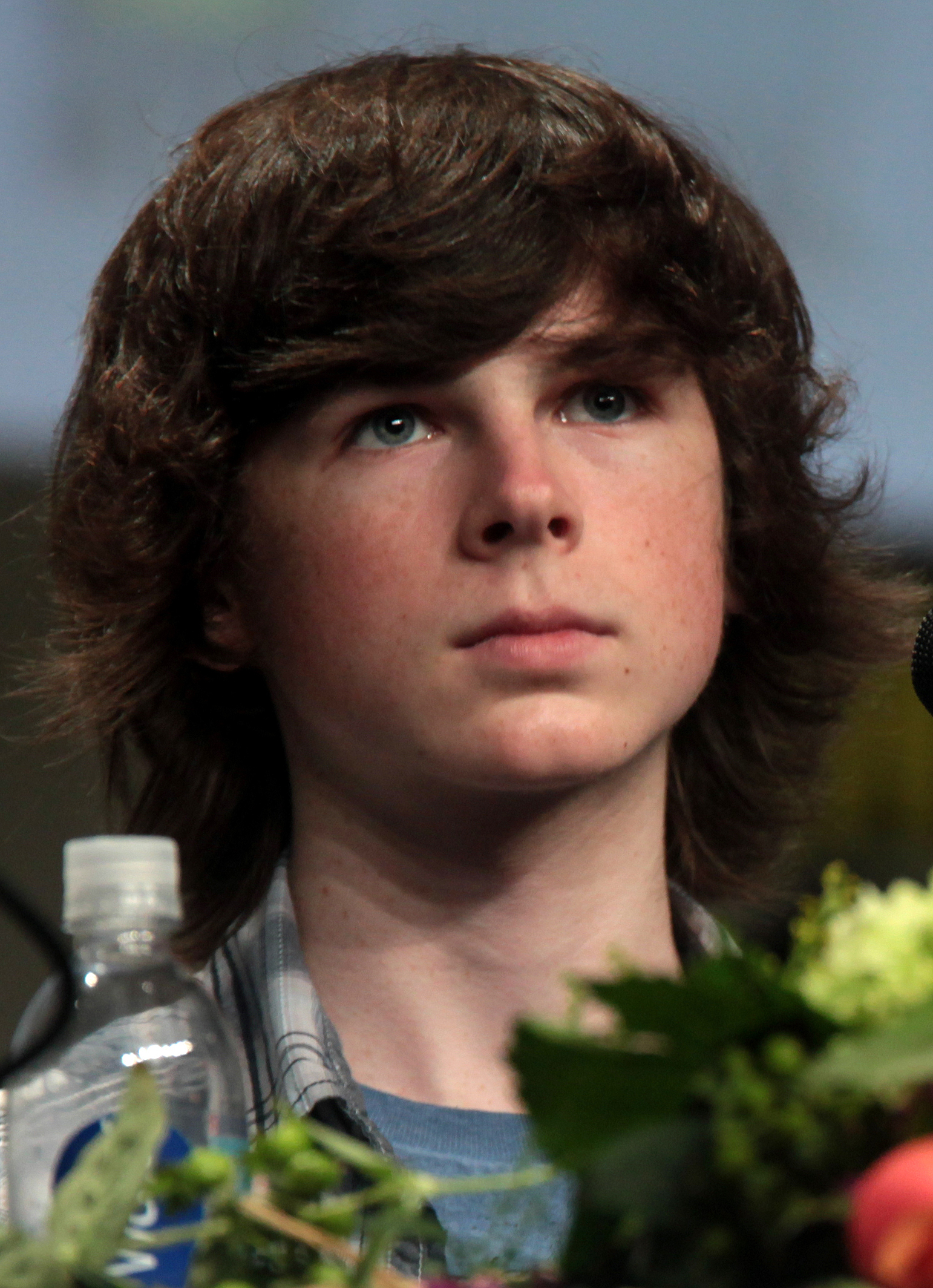
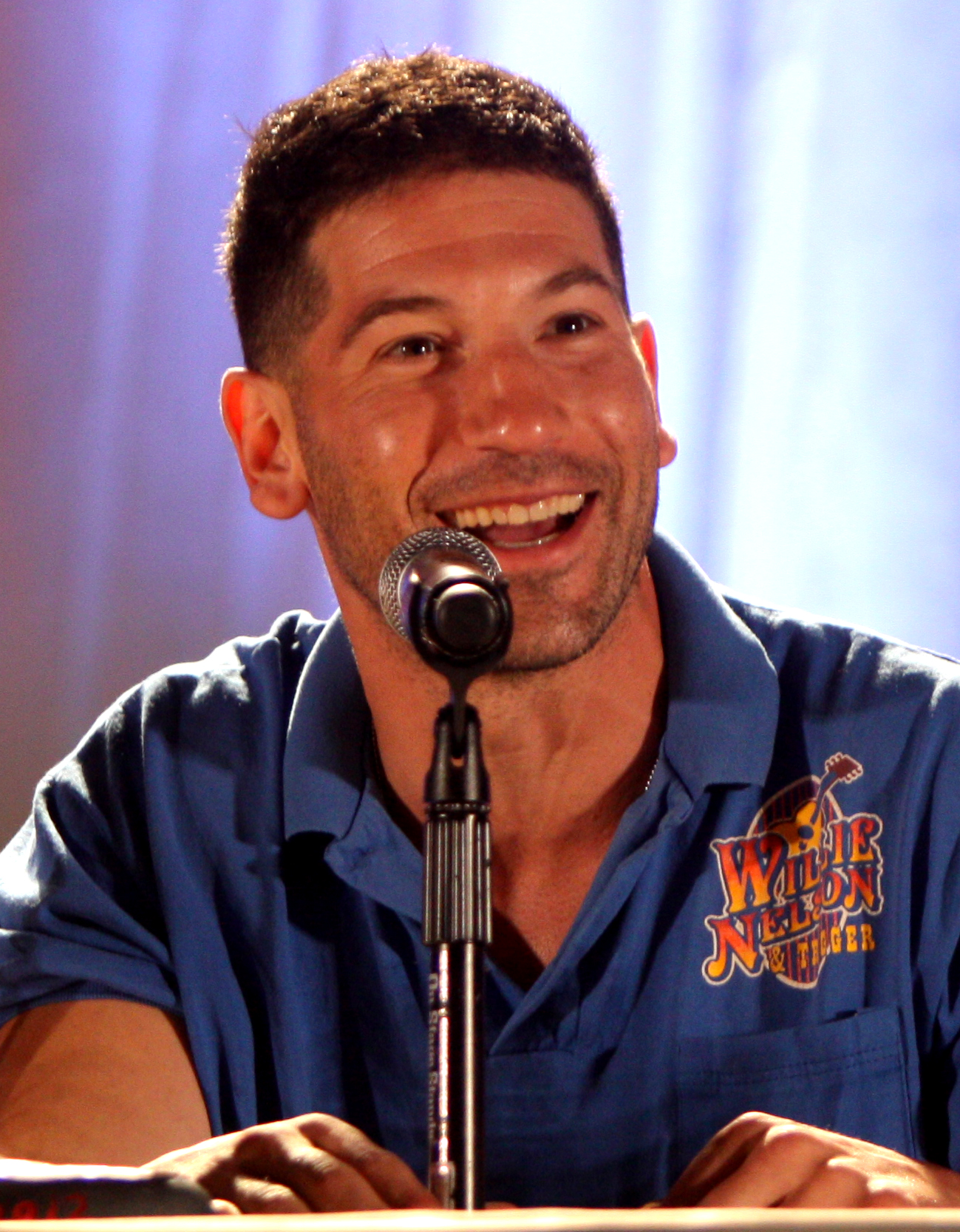
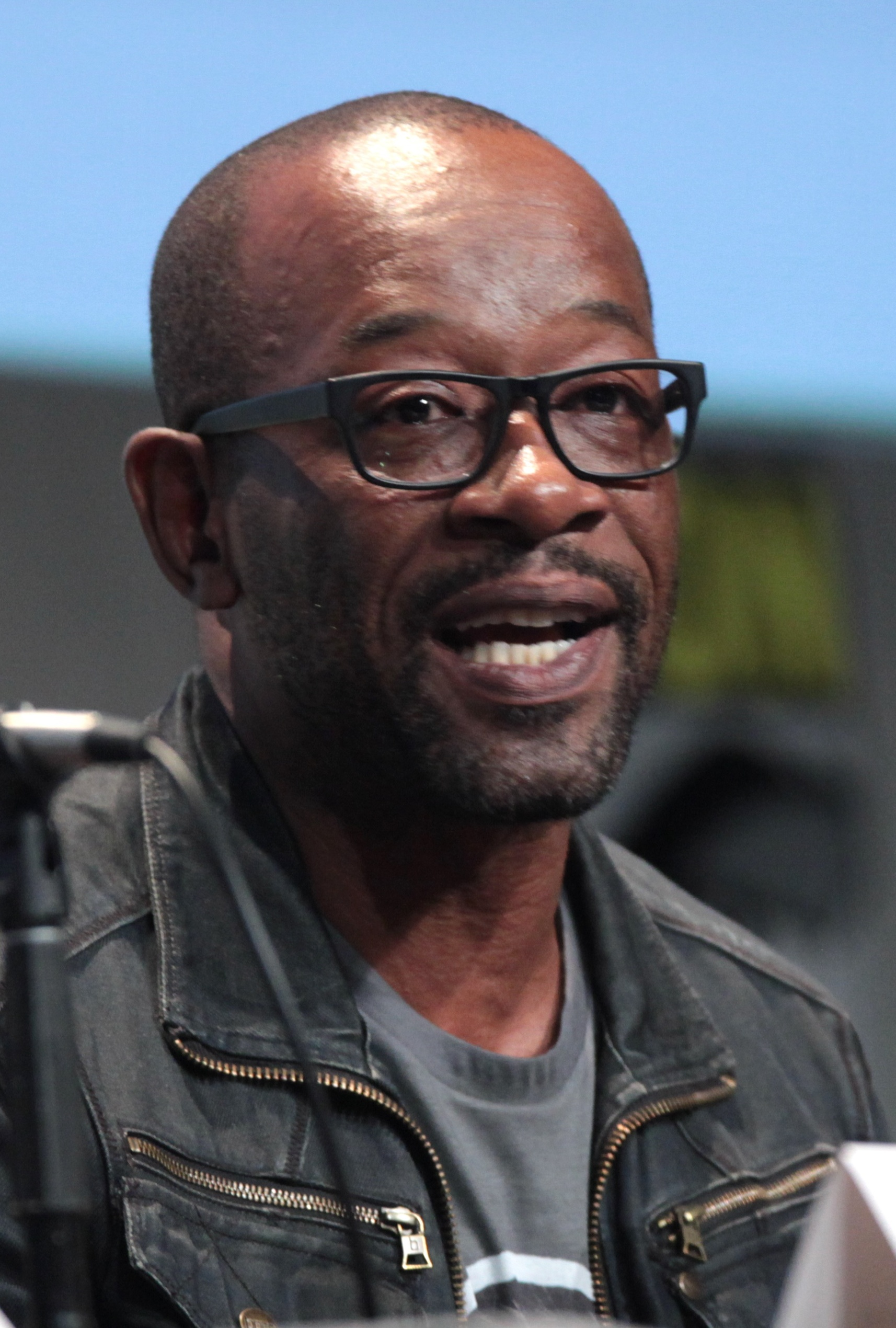
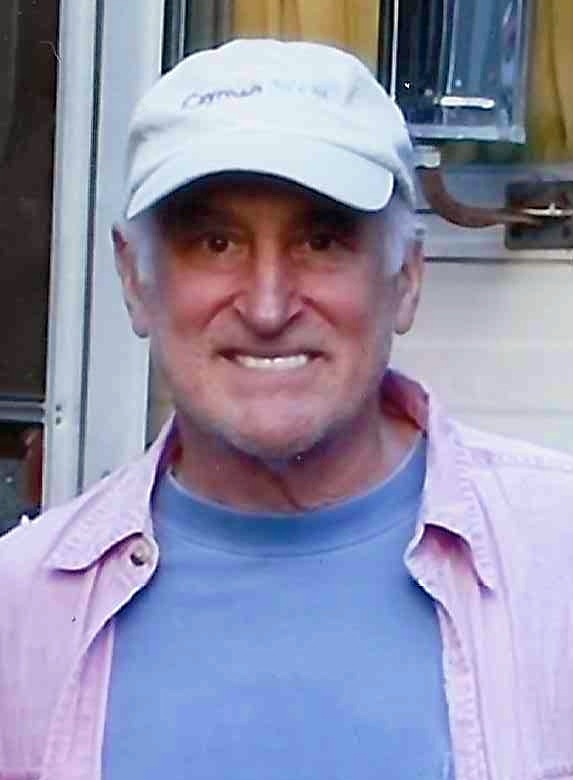
Andrew Lincoln, Sarah Wayne Callies, Chandler Riggs, Jon Bernthal, Lennie James and Jeffrey DeMunn make their first appearances in this episode as Rick Grimes, Lori Grimes, Carl Grimes, Shane Walsh, Morgan Jones and Dale Horvath, respectively.

=== Conception ===
Robert Kirkman claimed that he had considered the idea of a television series, but never actively pursued it. When Frank Darabont became interested, Kirkman called it "extremely flattering" and went on to say that "he definitely cares about the original source material, and you can tell that in the way he's adapting it." In his interview, Kirkman exclaimed that it was "an extreme validation of the work", and continued by expressing that "never in a million years could [he] have thought that if Walking Dead were to ever be adapted that everything would be going this well."

The Walking Dead institutes elements from George A. Romero's horror film Night of the Living Dead (1968). Darabont admitted to becoming a fan of the film at age fourteen. He insisted that the film has a "weird vibe", comparing it to that of pornography. He continued: "It had this marvelously attractive, disreputable draw [...] I loved it immediately." Darabont recalled walking into a comic book store in Burbank, California and seeing The Walking Dead on the shelf in 2005.

Being that I've always had 'the love of zombies gene', I of course grabbed it, took it home and read it, and immediately started pursuing the rights to it. I thought it would make a great TV show. I loved the idea of an extended, ongoing, serialized dramatic presentation set in the zombie apocalypse.

— Frank Darabont

Frank Darabont described the process of developing the series and setting it up at a network as "four years of frustration". He first initiated a deal with NBC to own copyrights to The Walking Dead, but was later declined. "They were very excited about the idea of doing a zombie show until I handed them a zombie script where zombies were actually doing zombie shit," he stated. Darabont credited Gale Anne Hurd with finally getting the series on AMC. "Gale was tremendously instrumental in jump-starting it at a point where it felt like it was languishing," he asserted. "I'd gotten turned down enough times, which is no reflection on the material, but no matter what you're trying to sell in Hollywood, you're Willy Loman and it's Death of a Salesman. You're out there trying to sell shit that nobody wants. Even if it's good shit."

Hurd recalled that she had heard of the comic before, and upon reading it, felt that it would be great for film. She stated: "When I first read the book, I thought, 'This would be a great film,' and boy was I wrong. It's a much better TV series. Fast forward, I knew that Frank had initially developed it for NBC, which to me seemed like an odd pairing for this. Then I heard it wasn't going forward at NBC so I talked to Frank." On January 20, 2010, AMC officially announced that it had ordered a pilot with Darabont and Hurd acting as executive producers; the former wrote the script and directed the episode. The entire series was pre-ordered based on the strength of the source material, the television scripts, and Darabont's involvement.

=== Writing ===
Frank Darabont wrote a 60-page pilot script for "Days Gone Bye". His initial script for the episode was split in half and embellished. Darabont explained that he did this to "slow the narrative down and dig into the characters more deeply, so it's not just plot-driven, event-driven stuff. You really want to drag these characters into the equation." Darabont felt that instituting visual maneuvers would increase the surreal atmosphere of a scene. Upon reading the script, Robert Kirkman thought that producers were consistent with his comic, adding that they could possibly improve his initial work. "Reading that pilot was just a revelation. It's extremely faithful. There are things that are so much like the comic, I can't really remember the nuance of what's different and what's not from the comic. He's definitely being more faithful than I expected, and everything that he's changing is brilliant. I couldn't be happier. I think the fans of the book are going to just love it." The episode shares its name with volume one of the comic book series.

The principal photography produced a high demand for extras as zombies. In an interview with MTV News, special effects artist Greg Nicotero stated that while anyone was welcome to audition, the producers of the show were looking specifically for people who possessed exceptional height and thin features. Casting for extras took approximately three days. Once accepted, the extras would be sent to "zombie school" for training and preparing for filming. Nicotero stated that "it was interesting because I initially thought my experience with zombie movies is you just let them do whatever they want to do. George [Romero] always said, 'You show 50 people one movement, then you have 50 people doing all the same thing.' So we sort of just lined them up and said, 'Let's see what your zombie walk would look like,' and then they would do it and we would say, 'Try this or try that.' You know, sort of fine tuning everybody." Alongside with Frank Darabont, Nicotero had previously collaborated with Romero on several occasions, and looked at the structure of the zombies in his films for inspiration. "It's not that I'm against [fast zombies]. It's just not what I grew up with. It's interesting, too, because a couple takes we did, where a couple of the zombies kind of broke into a run, and after one take Frank's like, 'Did they run too fast? They shouldn't be running. Slow them down.' This is trying to be creepy and moody and, you know, you're building up all this kind of scary tension."

I got an e-mail outlining the project. The first thing I read was AMC. I went, 'Great! I've been waiting for an AMC opportunity!' Then it said The Walking Dead. Terrific title. Then the names. Frank Darabont. Gale Anne Hurd. Great. And then it said 'zombie survival horror.' I think I actually did a literal double take. I was like, 'Really?!'

— Andrew Lincoln

In April 2010, The Hollywood Reporter revealed that Jon Bernthal and Andrew Lincoln were chosen by producers for the main cast of the series. Bernthal was to portray Shane Walsh, while Lincoln provided the role of Rick Grimes, the central character of The Walking Dead. While Gale Anne Hurd didn't expect to cast Lincoln, Robert Kirkman was ecstatic with his acting, evaluating him as an "amazing find". In his interview with Dread Central, Kirkman added that "writing Rick Grimes month after month in the comic series, I had no idea he was an actual living, breathing human being, and yet, here he is. I couldn't be more thrilled with how this show is coming together." Although he was initially shocked upon hearing of The Walking Dead, Lincoln thought the episode's script was well written. "I read it and thought it was well written, and I put myself on tape just for one scene. I didn't know who was involved at this point." The succeeding day, his agent called him about the development of the pilot. Lincoln described the moment as "kind of like a dream list". He later communicated with Darabont via Skype; "We spoke for about 40 minutes about his ideas for the project, about what I liked about Episode One and then he asked would I fly over to come and test." Lincoln flew to Darabont's home, where he viewed "Days Gone Bye" in his garage. He opined that was "brilliant" and "very intimate".

Bernthal was extremely comfortable with his character on set. "The second he opened his mouth and started reading the scene, I knew it was him," he said. "There was no question. I saw Frank and I knew it. He's the guy. He's a wonderful actor, and he's going to kill it in this role." Bernthal admitted that he had no prior knowledge of The Walking Dead. He reminisced that he reacted so "organically" to the script that he "didn't want to be colored by anything else. When I did read the comic, I was shocked. Look, I'm not going to sit here and regret. One of the great things about doing TV versus film is to be surprised yourself, to not let where you're going color where you are." The pilot episode's script was amongst several other scripts for proposed television pilots that Bernthal skimmed through; He felt that this script overshadowed the others. "[It was] pilot season, and I read everything that was out there. I still remember the day that I got this script. I told my agent that I'd be thrilled to be an extra in this, it's so good. It just blew the rest of them right out of the water."

Shortly after the announcement, Sarah Wayne Callies was approached to play the role of Rick's wife Lori Grimes, the lead female. Other actors garnering roles in the main cast include Steven Yeun, Chandler Riggs, and Jeffrey DeMunn. "Days Gone Bye" featured guest appearances from actors and actresses such as Emma Bell (Amy), Andrea's younger sister. Bell would later become part of the main cast as a recurring character. Lennie James played Morgan Jones and Jim Coleman guest performed Lam Kendal. Linds Edwards played Leon Bassett, Rick's co-worker. Keisha Tillis played Jenny Jones, Morgan's wife; and Adrian Kali Turner played Duane Jones, Jenny's son. Melissa Cowan played the bicycle girl walker; Sam Witwer, who had collaborated with Darabont in The Mist (2007), appeared as a dying soldier; Addy Miller played the teddy bear girl walker; and Joe Giles played an Atlanta walker who followed Rick. Frances Cobb played a camp survivor. Blade is the horse ridden by Andrew Lincoln.

=== Filming ===
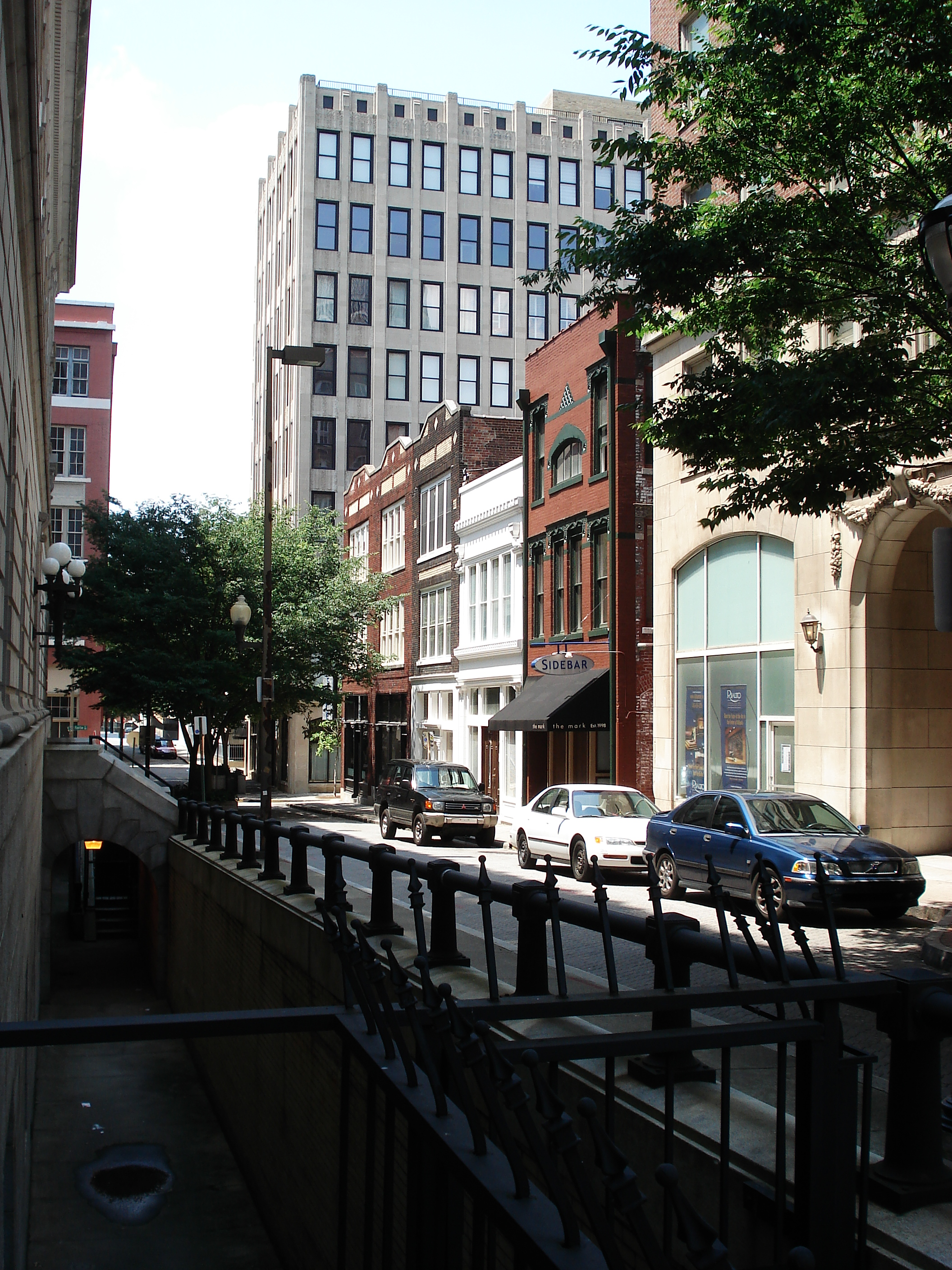
Principal photography for the episode largely took place in the Fairlie–Poplar district of Atlanta

The producers chose to film in Atlanta because of its proximity to Cynthiana, Kentucky, Robert Kirkman's hometown and the setting of his comic's first issue. "At the beginning they talk about how some of the people in neighboring states would have gone to larger cities so they could fortify them and protect the population." Kirkman had considered other cities, particularly New York City, Miami, and Chicago. Gale Anne Hurd had previously filmed in the city for Lifetime. Frank Darabont felt that Atlanta offered the essentials; "Atlanta and Georgia all-told is proving to be brilliant for us in terms of what it has to offer, in terms of what the story needed, in terms of the variety of locations—it really is a fantastic place to shoot." Prior to filming, Kirkman toured with Darabont around the central business district. He stated, "I tagged along on a location-scouting expedition, and that was pretty fun—watching Frank Darabont walking through the streets of Atlanta as if he owned the entire city, daring cars to hit him. That was a lot of fun." Darabont ventured onto the middle of a street to grasp a perfect shot, oblivious to oncoming traffic.

Atlanta's climate was cited as a potential issue that would hinder production. Darabont recalled that he found it difficult to adjust to the sweltering heat, adding that he "never had clothes stick to me like this in my life". Andrew Lincoln retorted that it was "becoming a running joke that people arrive on set ready for the day and then they are battered and beaten up by the weather." Despite such assertions, he opined that it added to the episode's overall emotion. "There's a lot of hard-earned sweat on camera. It's not comfortable and it's not pleasant, but it's as you would imagine it would be trying to survive in this world."

Principal photography took place in the city on May 15, 2010, after AMC had officially ordered the production of six episodes for the series. Filming took place over two months, ending in early July. Locations were set up in various spots within the central business district, particularly in the Fairlie–Poplar District. The season premiere was shot completely in anamorphic format on 16 mm film. David Tattersall was the director of photography, while production design was headed by Greg Melton and Alex Hajdu. The special effects team included veteran makeup designer Greg Nicotero, special effects coordinator Darrell Pritchett, and visual effects supervisors Sam Nicholson and Jason Sperling.

Computer-generated imagery was used in much of "Days Gone Bye", particularly when Rick encounters a legless walker. "The woman was wearing basically blue stockings and then everything was cleaned out. There is an alarming amount of CGI in the pilot episode and in the whole show, and you would never know it," said Robert Kirkman. Kirkman felt that Stargate Studios, which was chosen by producers to edit the pilot episode, did a splendid job. He stated: "There's a shot where Rick is riding off on the horse and his hat actually blew off, and they really liked that shot, and so they had Stargate go in and digitally put the hat back on his head."

=== Marketing ===
Locations of zombie invasion events

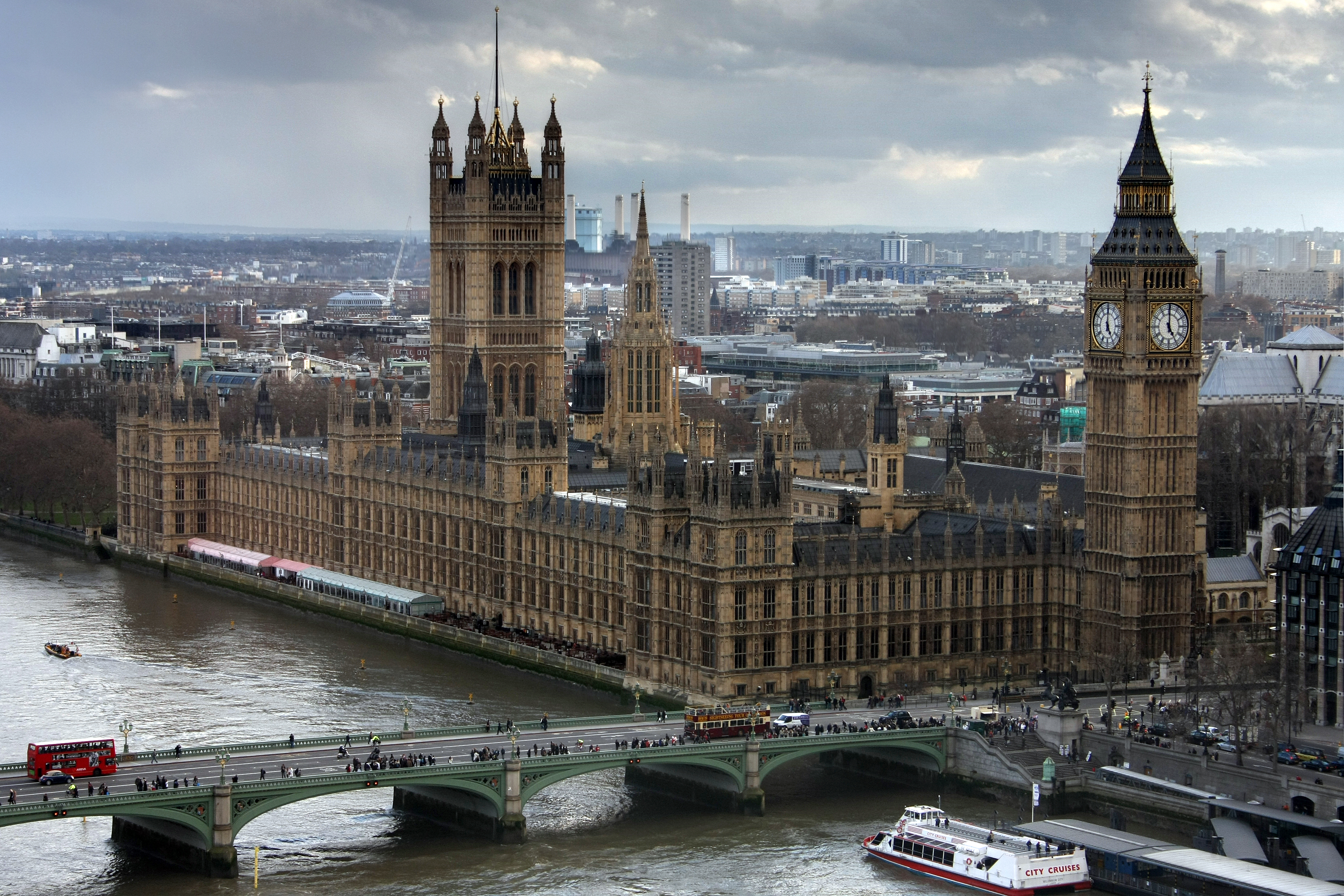
Palace of Westminster

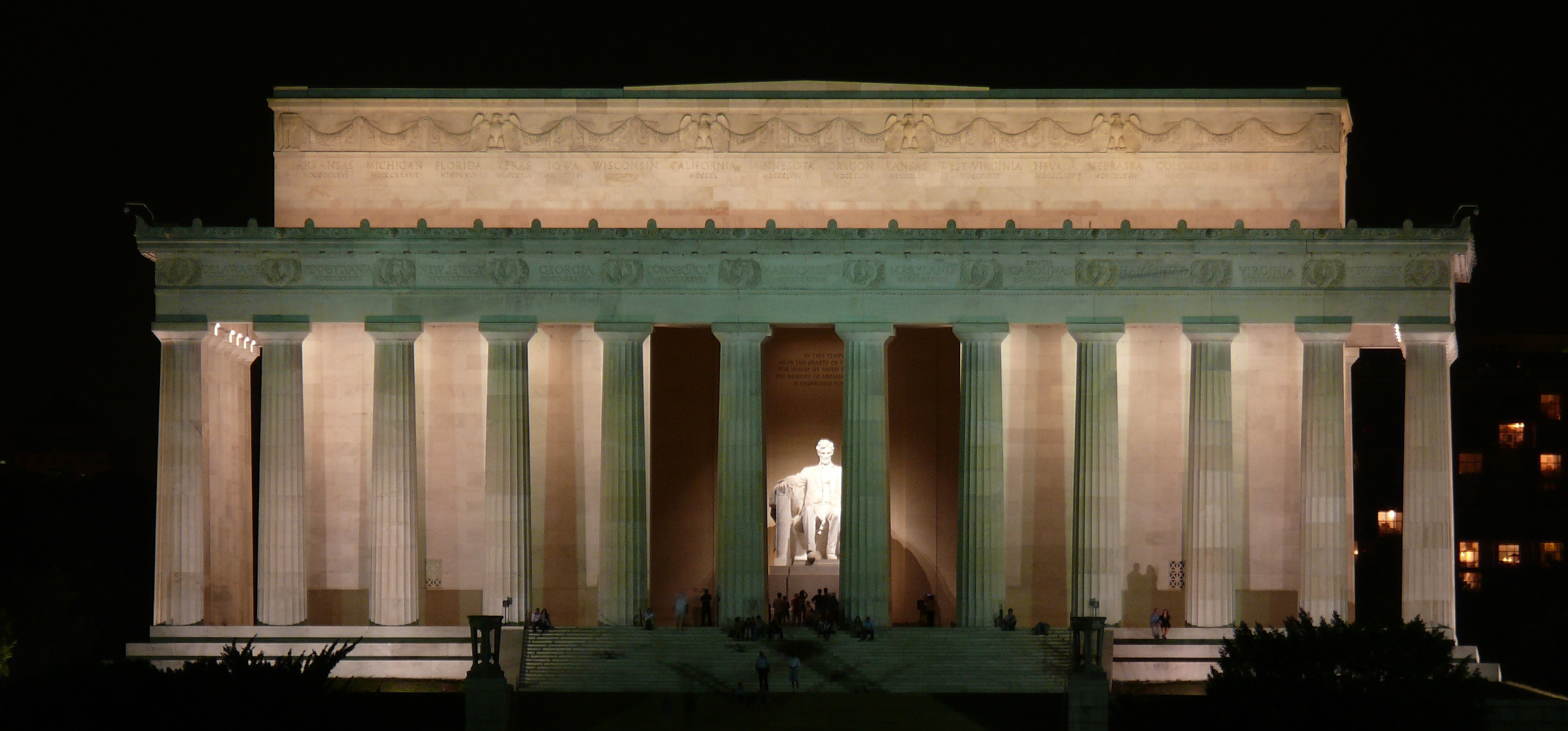
Lincoln Memorial

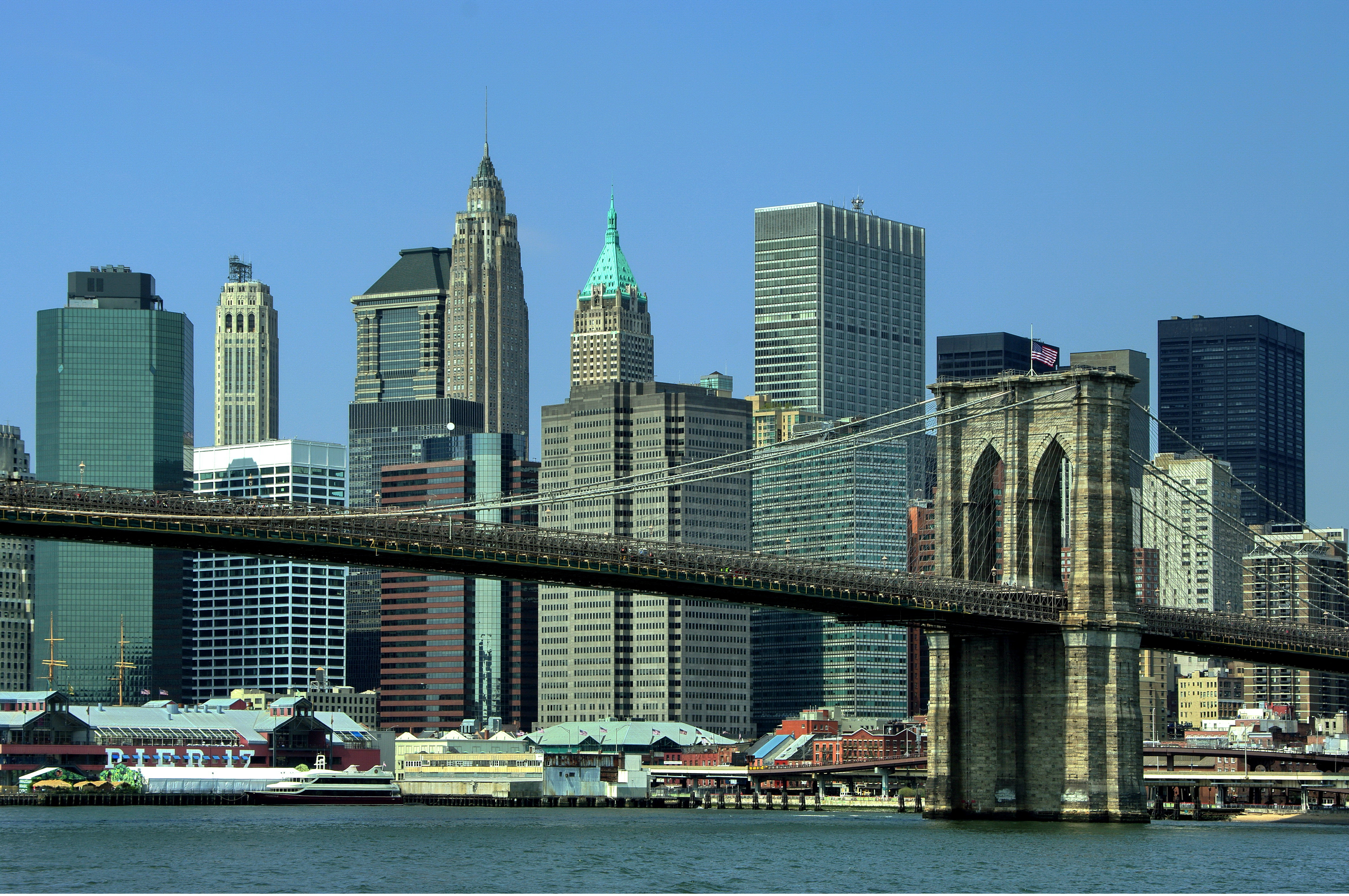
Brooklyn Bridge

The show's website released a motion comic based on the first issue of the original comic and voiced by Phil LaMarr. The site also posted a making-of documentary, and other behind-the-scenes videos and interviews. In the documentary, Kirkman as well as artist Charlie Adlard expressed pleasure that the show is faithful to the comic and remark on the similarities between the actors and the comic's original character drawings. Several scenes were screened July 23, 2010 as part of San Diego Comic-Con in 2010. Hurd asserted that "[they] really are doing six one-hour movies", and Frank Darabont insisted that the series would closely reflect the development in the comics. "The path is a very strong template. But we're going to take every interesting detour we feel like taking. As long as were staying on the path of what Robert has done, I don't see any reason not to. If they have patience we'll eventually catch up to what Robert is doing."

The Walking Dead debuted during the same week in 120 countries. "Days Gone Bye" premiered in Hong Kong on TVB Pearl on August 30, 2011, while it expanded in international markets during the first week of November. Two weeks prior to its official US premiere, the contents of the episode leaked online. As part of an expansive campaign to advertise and heighten anticipation for the premiere, international broadcasting affiliates of AMC and Fox coordinated a worldwide zombie invasion event days prior to the U.S. premiere. The event occurred in twenty six cities worldwide, in select locations including the Brooklyn Bridge in New York City, Lincoln Memorial in Washington, D.C., Palace of Westminster in London, Bosphorus Bridge in Istanbul, Acropolis of Athens in Athens, and the Museo del Prado in Madrid. The campaign events commenced in Hong Kong and Taipei, and culminated in Los Angeles.

== Themes ==
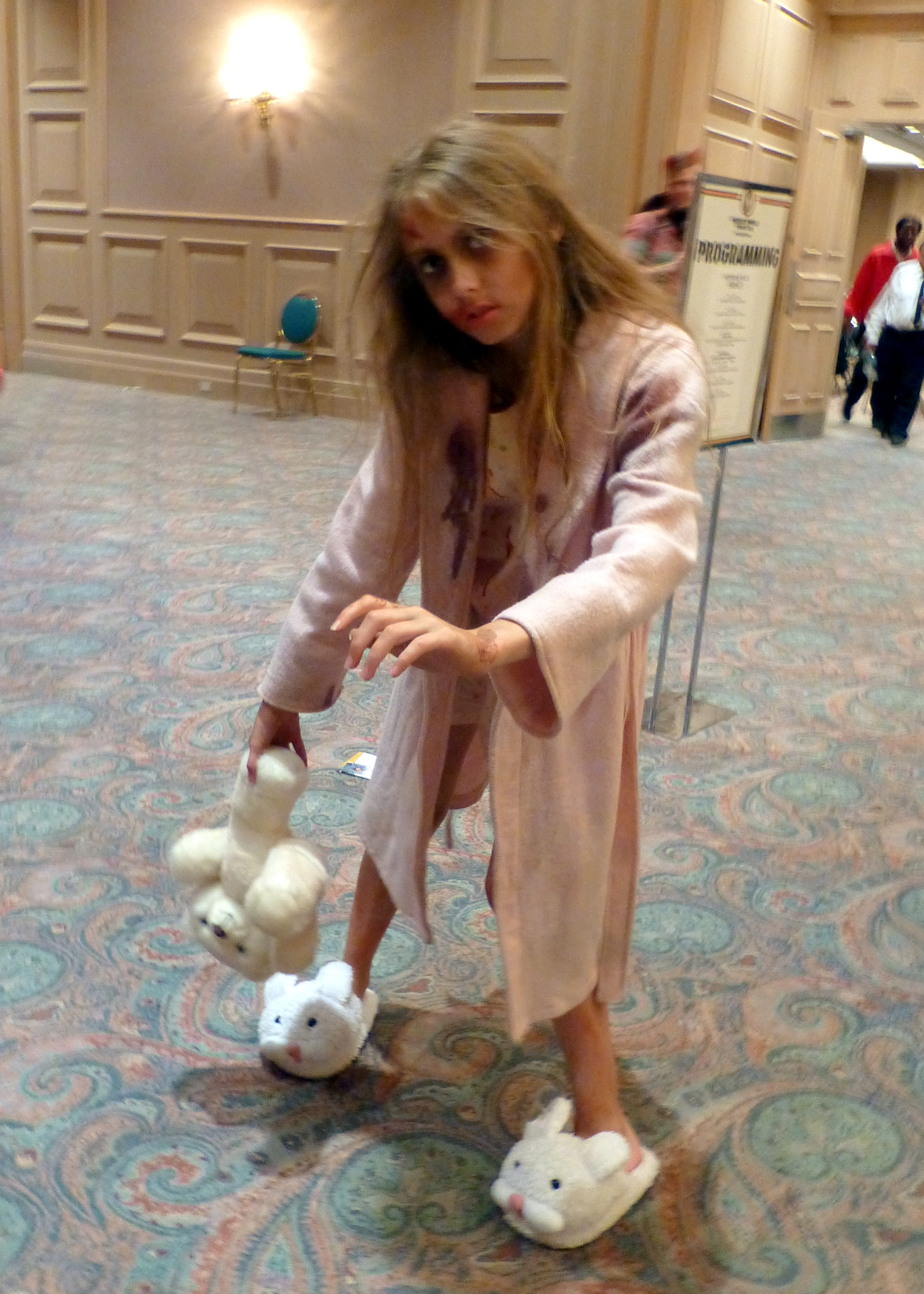
Cosplay of the girl trying to attack Rick at the beginning of the episode.

Romance is an underlying theme in "Days Gone Bye". After returning from the hospital, Rick Grimes unsuccessfully looks for signs of his family. Determined to find them, he travels to Atlanta, which is imagined to be a haven because of its proximity to the CDC. Kirkman said of the developing storyline:

Well, I didn’t know how long the comic book series was going to last. I hoped that it would become a success and survive for years and years. But at that time in my career, it was very early, I had had a lot of books canceled, just because of poor sales. So early on in the book I would move past storylines very quickly. I set up this love triangle and I resolved that story and moved along within the first [few] issues. But there's a lot of story potential to mine there. One of the things that the TV show is able to do is to look at the comic book series with hindsight and go, 'This would probably be something that we could explore more.' And that's what we're going to be doing. So we'll be seeing a lot more of the Lori-Shane-Rick love triangle.

The scene in which Grimes regains consciousness and investigates his situation is reminiscent of the British horror films The Day of the Triffids (1962) and 28 Days Later (2002). Kirkman insisted that the similarities especially with 28 Days Later was coincidental. "I saw 28 Days Later shortly before the first issue of Walking Dead was released," he stated. "That first issue came out in October of 2003 and 28 Days Later was released in the States in June of 2003. So we were working on our second issue by the time I saw it. It was going to be a matter of somehow trying to restage the entire first issue, because it was a very similar coma opening. I made a decision—which I pretty much regret at this point—I said, 'You know what? It's so different [from that point on], I will probably never hear anything about this.' And I was wrong."

== Reception ==
=== Ratings ===
The episode attained 5.35 million viewers, making it the most-viewed series premiere in AMC history. It garnered a 2.7 rating in the 18–49 demographic, translating to 3.6 million viewers according to Nielsen ratings. It subsequently attained the highest rating in the 18–49 demographic among cable television programs that year. Following two encore presentations, total viewership reached 8.1 million. "Days Gone Bye" became the highest-rated cable telecast ever, hitting significantly higher numbers than predecessors Swamp People and Ice Road Truckers on the History Channel.

It obtained 2.1 million viewers from the 18–34 demographic and 3.1 million from the 25–54 demographic. It became the highest-rated non-sport cable program of the week, as well as the third highest-rated overall program of the week dated October 30; "Days Gone Bye" was outperformed by a game between the Miami Heat and the Boston Celtics as part of the 2010–11 NBA season and a match between the New York Giants and the Dallas Cowboys as part of the 2010 NFL season. It is the third most-watched installment of The Walking Dead's first season, scoring less than "Wildfire" (5.56 million), and "TS-19" (5.97 million). "Days Gone Bye" garnered the highest total viewership for a season premiere out of any cable program up until the airing of its successor, "What Lies Ahead", which attracted 7.3 million viewers.

"Days Gone Bye" achieved similar success in European markets. It debuted in 120 countries in 33 languages. In the United Kingdom, the episode acquired 579,000 viewers, with an estimated 315,000 from the 18–49 demographic. It became the most-watched FX telecast of the week dated November 5. The terrestrial premiere (including Ireland and Scotland) aired on Channel 5 on April 10, 2011, garnering 1.5 million viewers. In Italy, "Days Gone Bye" became the highest-rated telecast of the night on pay television, delivering 360,000 spectators. In Spain, the pilot episode attained a 10.2% share in the television market amongst pay television programs, ultimately obtaining 105,000 viewers. It became the highest-rated series premiere on Fox that year.

The episode performed strongly in Asian markets. In South Korea, "Days Gone Bye" secured 57,000 spectators, subsequently becoming the highest-rated program on Fox that year. In Southeast Asia, total viewership hit 380,000, beating out all Western television programs. "Days Gone Bye" saw its strongest figures in Singapore and the Philippines, where its ratings exceeded the time slot average by 425% and 1,700%, respectively.

"Days Gone Bye" achieved substantial ratings in the 18–49 demographic in several Latin American countries. In Argentina, the pilot episode attained a 3.5 rating in the 18–49 demographic, thereby outperforming the time slot average by 341% and becoming the highest-rated program in its time slot on pay television. It acquired a 2.1 rating in Colombia and Peru, where it exceeded time slot averages by 176% and 970%, respectively. It became the highest-rated program in its time slot on pay television in both countries. "Days Gone Bye" garnered a 1.2 rating in the 18–49 demographic in Venezuela, becoming the highest-rated television program of the day on pay television.

==== Reaction ====
Charlie Collier, the president of AMC, stated that it was "a good day to be dead. We are so proud of this series, its depth of storytelling and the remarkable talent attached. As the network dedicated to bringing viewers the best stories on television, we are so pleased to have the opportunity with The Walking Dead to raise the bar within this popular genre and continue our commitment to being the home of premium television on basic cable." Senior Vice President Joel Stillerman ascribed that much of its success came from the storytelling presented in the episode; "The Walking Dead is that rare piece of programming that works on so many levels. It is legitimately great storytelling that is not only highly entertaining, but incredibly thought provoking as well. People who are familiar with the comic books know what's coming, but suffice it to say, this is only the beginning of a long, intense, and powerful ride. Long live The Walking Dead."

=== Critical response ===
And there's no underplaying the role of AMC, too, which is creating a distinctive brand out of very different series such as Mad Men, Breaking Bad, Rubicon, and now The Walking Dead. AMC makes sure that all of its shows breathe and move at a deliberate and challenging pace that is anathema to the networks. Also, AMC seems to require the kind of arresting visuals most often associated with the big screen.

— Matthew Gilbert
The Boston Globe

"Days Gone Bye" received critical acclaim. On Rotten Tomatoes, it holds a 100% with an average rating of 8.08 out of 10, based on 12 reviews. The site's consensus reads: The Walking Dead's debut delivers intense horror set apart by its focus on tragedy and the human condition—not to mention awesome zombie kills.

Sebastian Liver of Der Tagesspiegel insisted that the episode was setting new standards, and elaborated that it illuminates even during its timid moments. Mike Ryan of Vanity Fair reflected parallel sentiments, calling it the "best new television show of the year." Ryan felt that the series would broaden the audience of the horror genre, as well as attract new fans. "Finally, a horror show on television for people who hate horror. It's not that The Walking Dead isn't scary or doesn't contain gratuitous amounts of gore [...] but, where other horror projects opt for camp, The Walking Dead grounds itself in reality." Writing for The Atlantic, Scott Meslow affirmed that The Walking Dead was "as dark, intelligent, and uncompromising as any of AMC's other dramas."

St. Louis Post-Dispatch's Gail Pennington appraised "Days Gone Bye" as "genuinely terrifying", adding that despite being too gruesome for her tastes, it was "too engrossing not to watch." Pennington commended the character development in the episode, stating that Frank Darabont "finds time for the human tragedy of the situation." In an A− grade review, Boston Herald journalist Mark Perigard said that the pilot episode was a "suspenseful thriller", while Robert Bianco of USA Today avouched that it was "one killer of a zombie show." The Wall Street Journal writer Nancy deWolf Smith felt that "Days Gone Bye" contained a cinematic quality to it; "The pilot episode [is] so good that it has hooked even a zombie hater like me." Steve West of CinemaBlend praised the episode, calling it "the best pilot since Lost's introduction" and "a brilliant examination of what makes us human." Leonard Pierce of The A.V. Club gave the episode an 'A−' grade, and described it as a "stunning debut".

Matthew Gilbert of The Boston Globe said that the installment was "fully dynamic and engaging". "The Walking Dead is a promising human story built over a sea of grunting corpses. It's a scare-fest at points [...] and it's definitely extremely bloody, as zombie guts splatter all over the place like chunky borscht. The 90-minute premiere is a gory Halloween horror event, for sure." Liz Kelly and Jen Chaney of The Washington Post reacted positively to the series premiere, deeming it as a "chilling show", and exclaiming that it had a "very real sense that the world can go completely mad, and stay that way for good." Kris King of Starpulse said that it was "a welcome reprieve from the camp-laden world of zombie culture." Josh Jackson of Paste gave the episode an 8.8 out of 10. Jackson praised the final moments of the episode, describing it as "epic". IGN's Eric Goldman issued "Days Gone Bye" a nine out of ten, signifying an "amazing" rating. Jeff Jensen of Entertainment Weekly evaluated the pilot episode as intense, and felt that it delivered above expectations. He added that it was an "instant classic". Fellow journalist Dan Snierson agreed with Jensen's opinion, complimenting the show for its unpredictability.

James Poniewozik of Time reacted positively to the episode, exclaiming that it "paints a thoroughly convincing postapocalyptic world, both visually and emotionally." Variety's Brian Lowry avouched that "Days Gone Bye" was "surprisingly fresh", despite having initial thoughts of a stale premise. He wrote: "The Walking Dead draws the audience in almost instantly with its cinematic 90-minute pilot, then incorporates tasty soap-like elements meant to animate the ensuing episodes. Although we've seen no shortage of zombies and post-apocalyptic stories, producer-writer-director Frank Darabont has deftly tackled the seemingly perilous task of adapting a comic book about zombies into a viable episodic series." In a three out of four star review, Linda Stasi of New York Post summarized, "The zombies are truly scary and disgusting. The survivors are terrific characters, and the gore is enough for any lunatic to love."

Critics were polarized over Andrew Lincoln's performance. Despite citing that his accent was "dodgy", Pierce lauded Lincoln's acting. "his body language and expression here is totally different now than when we saw him before," he opined. "He's a fast learner." Gilbert referred to his accent as "spotty", while Goldman professed that Lincoln fit into character very well; "For much of the pilot, he's on his own and exudes a lot of believable, shocked emotion, as Rick tries to process what he is seeing. Tim Goodman of The Hollywood Reporter felt that Lincoln's performance was one of the episode's drawbacks. He wrote: "One drawback in [The Walking Dead] is that Lincoln plays his emotion a little too close to his deputy's badge. We're told – by him – that all he wants to do is find his wife and kid. His belief that they still are alive is the emotional drive of the story, but there's not enough deep pain that seeps up to coat the dialogue Lincoln delivers."

== Accolades ==
At the 63rd Primetime Creative Arts Emmy Awards, "Days Gone Bye" received nominations for Outstanding Sound Editing for a Series and Outstanding Special Visual Effects for a Series; and won Primetime Emmy Award for Outstanding Prosthetic Makeup for a Series, Miniseries, Movie, or Special.

The episode was nominated for Outstanding Achievement in Sound Editing – Sound Effects and Foley for Episodic Long Form Broadcast Media and Outstanding Achievement in Sound Editing – Dialogue and ADR for Episodic Long Form Broadcast Media at the 2011 Golden Reel Awards.

Its editor Hunter M. Via won the American Cinema Editors Award for Best Edited One Hour Series for Commercial Television, while its director Frank Darabont was nominated for Directors Guild of America Award for Outstanding Directing – Drama Series.

== Legacy ==
For the show's 100th episode, "Mercy", which aired on October 22, 2017, executive producers Greg Nicotero and Scott M. Gimple wanted to create callbacks to this episode. Specifically, the episode included a near shot-for-shot remake of Rick Grimes searching for supplies among abandoned cars, though in this case, with Carl in his shoes. For this, they recast Addy Miller, now a teenager, as a walker that threatens Rick and Carl. They also recast Joe Giles, who plays one of the walkers that followed Rick off the bus in Atlanta, as a walker in "Mercy". Additional scenes from "Mercy", apparently set in the future, were done to mirror the shots of Rick waking up from his coma in the hospital.
