= Andrew Rothenberg =

American actor

- Born: January 26, 1969 (age 57); Los Angeles County, California, U.S.
- Occupation: Actor
- Years active: 1993–present

Andrew Rothenberg (born January 26, 1969) is an American stage, television and film actor. Rothenberg is known for recurring roles in major television series, including Agent Phil Schlatter on Weeds and his portrayal of Malcolm on the HBO vampire series True Blood. Rothenberg portrayed Jim, a survivor of a zombie apocalypse in the first season of the AMC television series The Walking Dead based on the comic book series of the same name. Rothenberg also voiced and motion captured the character of Stuart Ackerman in the video game L.A. Noire.

== Filmography ==
=== Film ===
Year	Title	Role	Notes
1997	Chicago Cab	Homer	
2000	The Watcher	FBI Agent Jack Fray	
2001	Save the Last Dance	Stern Judge	
2004	Life Sentence	B. Rian	
2005	Repetition	Danny	
2006	Stranger Than Fiction	Dr. Mercator	
2008	Poker House	Clyde Senior	
2010	Black Mail	Colm	
2011	The Umpire	Sal Crawford	Short
2013	One for My Baby	Actor	Short
2014	The Accident	Charles	Short
2017	Midnighters	Officer Verone	
2018	30 Miles from Nowhere	Max	

=== Television ===
Year	Title	Role	Notes
1993	Missing Persons	Glen	1 episode
1996–1997	EZ Streets	Shirt	Recurring role, 5 episodes
1998–2000	Early Edition	Raymond Malone / Man At Hotel	2 episodes: "Where or When" (season 2: episode 16) "Snow Angels" (season 4: episode 12)
1999	Turks	Man #2	1 episode
1999	ER	Pauly Johnson	1 episode
1999–2001	Walker, Texas Ranger	Johnny / Boyd Scranton	2 episodes: "Suspicious Minds" (season 8: episode 7) "Unsafe Speed" (season 9: episode 19)
2000	Judging Amy	Russell Younger	1 episode
2006	Prison Break	Sklar	2 episodes
2006	Criminal Minds	Motel Manager	1 episode
2007	Monk	Medical Examiner	1 episode
2007	Without a Trace	'Ziggy' Raines	1 episode
2008	Weeds	Agent Phil Schlatter	Recurring role, 4 episodes
2008	Numb3rs	Joey Herman	1 episode
2008	True Blood	Malcolm	3 episodes
2008	NCIS	Bruce Solomon	Episode: "Road Kill"
2008	The Unit	Pool Player	1 episode
2009	Lie to Me	Kevin Rich	1 episode
2009	Medium	Kevin Flynn	2 episodes
2009	CSI: Crime Scene Investigation	Walter Ellis	1 episode
2009	Raising the Bar	Unknown	1 episode
2009	NCIS: Los Angeles	Teddy Morgan	1 episode
2010–2012	The Walking Dead	Jim	Season 1 (4 episodes); Season 3 (guest star; 1 episode)
2010	Castle	Donald Salt	1 episode
2010	Dark Blue	'Iggy'	1 episode
2010	Supernatural	'Lucky'	1 episode
2011	No Ordinary Family	Austin Davies	Episode: "No Ordinary Detention"
2011	Law & Order: LA	Stanley Vaughn	1 episode
2011	Hawthorne	Unknown	1 episode
2012	The Mentalist	Jack Hellion	Episode: "Pink Champagne on Ice"
2012	American Horror Story	Mr. Potter	Episode: "Tricks and Treats"
2013	Person of Interest	Ross Haskell	Episode: "Trojan Horse"
2013	Mob City	Eddy Sanderson	6 episodes
2015	Elementary	Finn	1 episode
2015	Blue Bloods	Andy Barstow	1 episode
2015	The Mysteries of Laura	Dr. Nick	1 episode
2016	The Good Wife	George Kirby	1 episode
2016	The Exorcist	Jim	1 episode
2017	Chicago Justice	Creary's Lawyer	1 episode
2018	Electric Dreams	Captain Miller	1 episode
2018	Madam Secretary	Ben	1 episode
2018	Chicago Fire	Mr. Jamison	4 episodes
2018	Dietland	Detective	1 episode
2021	The Blacklist	Murderer	Episode: "Nicholas Obenrader" S. 8 Ep. 16
2023	Law & Order	David Costa	Episode: "Deadline"

Videogames
Year	Title	Role
2011	L.A. Noire	Stuart Ackerman
2018	Red Dead Redemption 2	Lindsay Wofford
