= Adam Minarovich =

American actor

- Born: Adam Minarovich; January 30, 1977 (age 49); Houston, Texas, U.S.
- Occupations: Actor, screenwriter, film director
- Years active: 2002–present
- Children: 1

Adam Minarovich is an American actor, screenwriter and film director. He is known for his recurring role Ed in the American television series The Walking Dead.

Minarovich, a native of Anderson, South Carolina. He has operated a gold resale and cell phone store with his cousin between acting roles. Minarovich directed and appeared in the film, Exhibit A-7. Minarovich portrayed Ed, the abusive husband of Carol (Melissa McBride) in the 2010 television series, The Walking Dead. Minarovich wrote the script to the 2013 black comedy film Pawn Shop Chronicles.

Minarovich has a role in the 2019 film, Blackbear (a.k.a. Submission).
