= Seed (The Walking Dead) =

- The Walking Dead episode
- Promotional image of Danai Gurira, who makes her entrance in the television series as the comic book character Michonne.
- Episode no.: Season 3 Episode 1
- Directed by: Ernest Dickerson
- Written by: Glen Mazzara
- Cinematography by: Rohn Schmidt
- Editing by: Julius Ramsay
- Original air date: October 14, 2012

Guest appearances
- IronE Singleton as Theodore "T-Dog" Douglas; Emily Kinney as Beth Greene; Lew Temple as Axel; Theodus Crane as Big Tiny; Nick Gomez as Tomas; Markice Moore as Andrew; Vincent M. Ward as Oscar

Episode chronology
| ← Previous "Beside the Dying Fire" | Next → "Sick" |
- The Walking Dead season 3

"Seed" is the third season premiere of the post-apocalyptic horror television series The Walking Dead, which aired on AMC in the United States and Canada on October 14, 2012. The episode was written by showrunner Glen Mazzara and directed by Ernest Dickerson.

Set eight months after abandoning Hershel Greene's (Scott Wilson) farmland, Rick Grimes (Andrew Lincoln) and his group of survivors take refuge in the prison complex shown at the end of the previous episode. Meanwhile, Michonne (Danai Gurira) cares for an ailing Andrea (Laurie Holden).

The episode is the first non extended-length premiere of The Walking Dead. It received generally critical acclaim, with many critics praising its return to form in levels of gore, tension and urgency. Many also noted it as an example of showrunner Glen Mazzara's promise for a "higher level of action", as seen in the earlier episodes of the series. The episode also featured the promotion of Danai Gurira to a series regular from featured stand-in.

Upon airing, the episode garnered 10.9 million viewers and broke several records not only for the series, but television history as well.

== Plot ==
Eight months after Rick kills Shane, and the onslaught at the Greene Family Farm, the world continues to grow increasingly more dangerous while Lori's pregnancy advances. Rick, who has now assumed a dictatorial-like leadership over his group of survivors, and company are now in search of a safe haven, as Lori is due to give birth any day. While hunting for food, Rick and Daryl happen upon a prison complex—West Georgia Correctional Facility—full of walkers. After Rick tells the group about the prison and how it could be a new home for them, the group clears out the outer prison courtyard of walkers and secure their position within the fences. As many of the dispatched walkers wear prison or guard uniforms, Rick believes the prison may have fallen early during the epidemic and could hold a large supply cache. Lori later tries to talk to Rick about the child, but, as their relationship deteriorates, he dismisses her so that he can focus on planning their approach for the next day.

Elsewhere, Andrea has fallen severely ill with influenza since being separated from the group and taken in by Michonne, the hooded figure with the sword who rescued her from walkers attacking her in the woods. The two aren't faring well and have taken refuge in a deer cooler. Michonne scours for aspirin or other medication from a store to reduce Andrea's fever. She returns to Andrea, who also feels like a burden to Michonne and tells her to abandon her, but Michonne refuses. They conclude they must move on as a group of walkers are advancing, so they head off out toward the woods.

The next day, the group methodically clears out the inner prison yard of walkers before moving into the prison to clear out a cell block. Daryl notes one wore civilian clothes, suspecting there may have been a breach. Rick and the others start clearing away the walker bodies, giving Lori the chance to confide to Hershel that she fears her child may be stillborn and reanimate as a walker, but Hershel calms her down and reassures her that the child is in fine health. Later, Rick, Daryl, Hershel, Glenn, Maggie and T-Dog go on a scouting mission to other parts of the prison and move deeper into the interior, many in total darkness. All seems quiet at first, but suddenly they run into several groups of walkers. In the darkness and confusion, Glenn and Maggie get separated from the group. When it's finally safe to venture back out, Hershel tries to find the two but is bitten on his right calf by a walker that only appeared to be dead. The group then reunites and assists Hershel in getting out of the corridor. They take refuge and barricade themselves in the cafeteria, where Rick, in an attempt to save Hershel, amputates his right leg with a hatchet to prevent the infection from spreading. However, this causes Hershel to go into shock and pass out from the ensuing blood loss. Then, five shadowy figures appear in the adjacent room watching the group. Daryl prepares to fire, but realizes they are not walkers but are actually surviving prisoners.

== Production ==
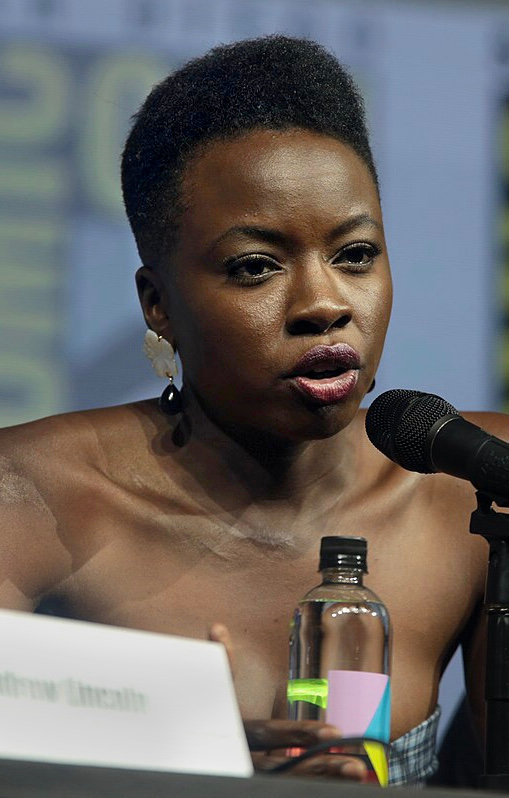
Danai Gurira made her first appearance as Michonne in this episode

Danai Gurira makes her first appearance as Michonne. She was officially announced, during an episode of Talking Dead, to have been cast. During an interview with The Hollywood Reporter, Kirkman said: "There's a lot to that role, and Danai, more than any other actress, showed us that she could exhibit that strength and show what an intense character she could be and, at the same time, have that emotional core and be able to show a vulnerability to a certain extent that we don't see much of but is definitely there." He added, "she really was the whole package, and I think she's going to do a really good job". Gurira later commented on implementing her character's traits:

"I was trying to really investigate a character and allow her to have as much dimension as possible and crack it open even more. What you see through the writing and vision of the creator, you add to it by bringing your full humanity and by really delving into the character's background and their motives and fears; all those things can make a multidimensional character come to life. That's how I've been trained from the beginning and how I've created characters in the past on the stage or through my playwriting. I plan to bring all of that to the table to allow Michonne to be as rich and complex as possible. I'm excited to bring her to life as someone who really has a lot of life and a lot of complexity."

== Reception ==
=== Critical response ===
The episode received critical acclaim. On Rotten Tomatoes, it holds a 100% with an average rating of 8.73 out of 10, based on 15 reviews. The critics' consensus reads: Season three of The Walking Dead responds to its audience's call to action with "Seed," an action-packed premiere. Eric Goldman of IGN gave the episode a 9.2 out of 10. Zack Handlen, writing for The A.V. Club, gave the episode an A− on a scale from A to F.

=== Ratings ===
Upon its initial broadcast on October 14, 2012, "Seed" broke several records when it reached 10.9 million viewers, becoming the most-watched scripted drama telecast on a basic cable network in history and the most-watched episode of the series to date, surpassing the previous record held by the season two finale, "Beside the Dying Fire". It was ultimately surpassed for the former record by the season four premiere, "30 Days Without an Accident", which was then surpassed by the season five premiere, "No Sanctuary". The season three premiere also saw a 33.4% increase in viewership from the season two premiere, "What Lies Ahead".
