= Killer Within =

- The Walking Dead episode
- Carl prepares to put down his mother before reanimation after giving birth to Judith.
- Episode no.: Season 3 Episode 4
- Directed by: Guy Ferland
- Written by: Sang Kyu Kim
- Cinematography by: Rohn Schmidt
- Editing by: Julius Ramsay
- Original air date: November 4, 2012

Guest appearances
- IronE Singleton as Theodore "T-Dog" Douglas; Emily Kinney as Beth Greene; Lew Temple as Axel; Markice Moore as Andrew; Vincent M. Ward as Oscar

Episode chronology
← Previous "Walk with Me"	Next → "Say the Word"
- The Walking Dead season 3

"Killer Within" is the fourth episode of the third season of the postapocalyptic horror television series The Walking Dead. It originally aired on AMC in the United States on November 4, 2012, and was written by Sang Kyu Kim and directed by Guy Ferland. The episode marked Sarah Wayne Callies and IronE Singleton's final appearances as Lori Grimes and Theodore "T-Dog" Douglas as regular actors on the show. Most television critics positively reviewed the episode, applauding its bleak undertones and the performances, but some commentators criticized the narrative ploys and the direction taken in the program. "Killer Within" was viewed by 9.27 million viewers, including 4.9% of those in the 18 to 49 demographic upon its initial broadcast in the United States. The episode is often cited as one of the show's best episodes.

== Plot ==
Outside the prison an unidentified individual lures a group of walkers towards the prison, breaking open the front gate's lock to allow them inside.

=== Woodbury ===
Michonne is suspicious of how the Governor recovered supplies from a nearby National Guard camp, but he refuses to discuss it. She expresses her concerns with Andrea, and believes they should leave and head for the coast. Andrea would rather stay, and provides information on the Greene farmstead to allow Merle to look for his brother Daryl. The Governor tells Merle he will allow the search once Merle obtains more concrete information. Andrea begins to become romantically involved with the Governor.

=== Prison ===
Rick Grimes discusses with the others about making the prison their permanent home. The two remaining prisoners Axel and Oscar request to join the group, but Rick, still distrustful, informs them of his intent to send them away at the end of the week.

The group gathers as Hershel Greene takes his first steps after the amputation of his right leg. Suddenly, walkers swarm the courtyard, scattering the group. T-Dog, having been bitten on the right shoulder while shutting the gate, races after Carol and sacrifices himself by barreling into a walker horde to let her escape. Rick, Glenn, and Daryl find the gate's lock broken and resecure it to prevent further walkers from entering. Rick accuses Axel and Oscar of the treachery, but an alarm begins sounding due to activation of a backup generator, potentially drawing more walkers. Rick realizes the prisoners cannot be at fault and lets them lead him to the generator room. There, they find Andrew, whom Rick had left for dead, as the instigator. Andrew is about to kill Rick when Oscar shoots him using Rick's revolver, and then turns the gun over to him. They stop the generator and disable the alarm.

Elsewhere, Carl covers for his mother Lori and Maggie as they take shelter in a boiler room. Lori has gone into labor, but is bleeding profusely during her contractions, thus unable to give birth properly in the boiler room. Lori demands Maggie perform a lethal Caesarean section to deliver the child, knowing it will kill her, but would rather die knowing her baby will live. The baby is delivered safely, but Lori dies; Carl takes a moment to mourn before shooting her in the head to prevent reanimation.

With the walkers dealt with, the group rejoins in the courtyard, though Carol is still missing. Rick sees Carl and Maggie emerging from a cell block with the baby, but realizes Lori is not with them and becomes hysterical.

== Production ==
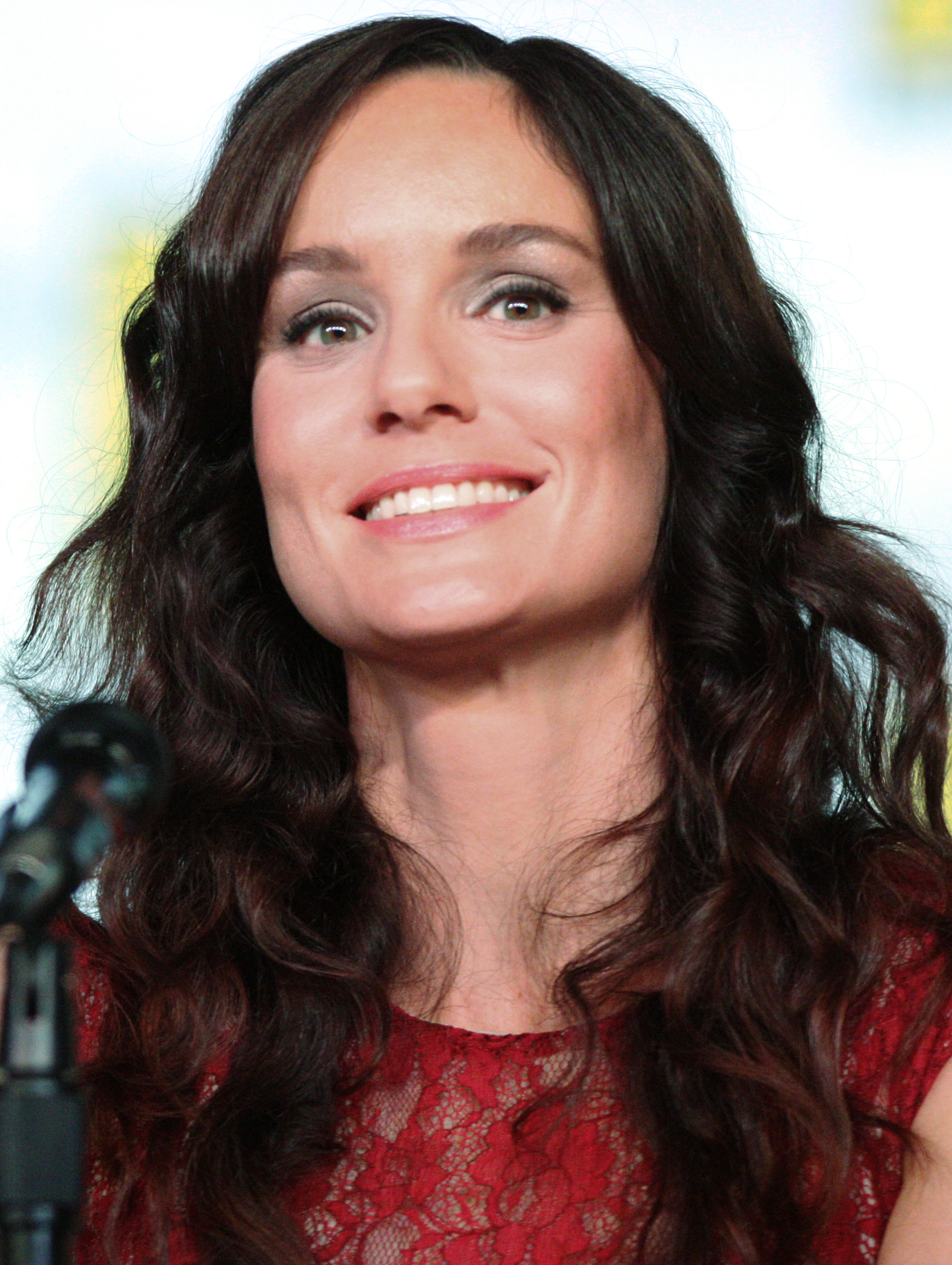
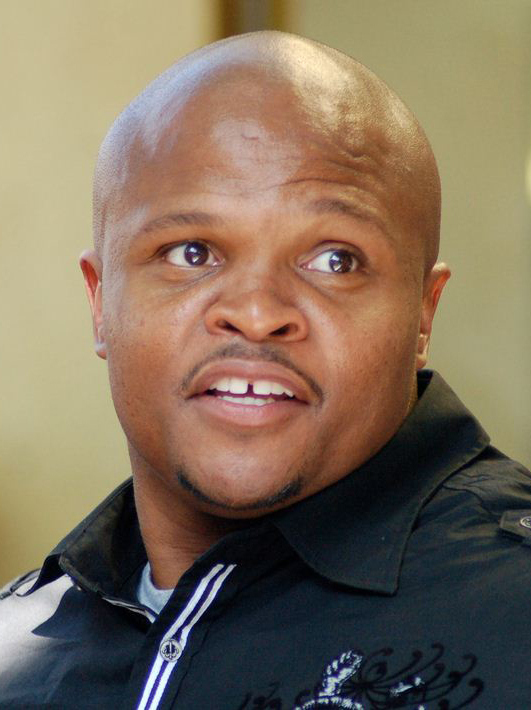
The episode marks the death of Lori Grimes (Sarah Wayne Callies) (left) and the last appearance of IronE Singleton (right).

"Killer Within" was written by Sang Kyu Kim. Guy Ferland directed, his second such credit for The Walking Dead's third season. Ferland previously directed episode 3, "Walk with Me".

"Killer Within" signified the final appearances of Sarah Wayne Callies (Lori) and IronE Singleton (T-Dog) as regulars. In an early script draft, Melissa McBride (Carol) was going to be killed off in this episode but the producers eventually decided that it would be T-Dog. Although Callies suggested Lori's death to Frank Darabont on numerous occasions, Glen Mazzara made the decision to kill her off. The writing team chose to advance the revelation into the earlier part of the season, to provide "fresh" opportunities for the staff. Mazzara and Callies conversed minimally about how Lori would die, but Callies opted to wait until the script's release to acquire more insight, since her character "doesn’t know she’s going to die". She rehearsed and revised the dialogue with Mazzara for a couple of weeks. Some of the adjustments, Mazzara said, were not initially in the script. "I just thought, it belongs there," Callies stated.

To prepare for the death scene, Callies viewed the Stanley Kubrick-directed war film Full Metal Jacket (1987) with Ferland. She liked Arliss Howard's performance and described his character's demise as a brisk, "kind of strange death". Callies did not practice her character's death with Riggs. Instead, the final day enabled them to possess "so many emotions in [their] hearts" and to deliver an emotionally poignant and raw performance.

Producers trained Cohan to perform a Caesarian in preparation for the scene. Callies wore a leotard-esque rig resembling a pregnant abdomen; a prosthetic abdomen was later glued onto the suit. This process took about an hour to complete. Inside the prosthetic abdomen was additional layering that imitated a uterus, which held the fetus. An insert shot was taken while the abdomen was sliced open, emphasizing the uncontrollable blood flow. The liquid was pumped through a small tube attached to the front of the suit.

Singleton was informed about his character's fate before production of the third season began and had to avoid arousing any suspicion from the public, particularly T-Dog's fans. Singleton said about his character's "heroic" death: "When I read [the script], I was thankful that he would go out as a hero. It made me feel really appreciated."

== Themes ==
The central theme in "Killer Within" is death. T-Dog sacrifices himself to allow Carol to escape, while Lori dies after an improvised operation, and Andrew dies while trying to kill Rick. Kirkman wanted Rick and Carl to develop a different psyche during the season and Lori's death would serve as a catalyst for both characters' development. Rick's anguish manifests in much of the episode's concluding scene. Kirkman agreed, proclaiming that not only was it inevitable, but it also develops Rick's character.

Sarah Wayne Callies described her takes on the scene and its significance to TVLine: "I thought it was brilliant. I thought it was brilliantly shot to have Carl strong and cold in the foreground and Rick collapsed. I know they shot it a bunch of different ways. There were a bunch of different ideas about how that scene could play. But it was beautiful because in some ways it’s the apotheosis of Carl. It’s this young boy having just performed a great act of both mercy and violence [against] his mother recognizing that dad’s not going to be able to get me through this right now, so I’ll be the strong one."

Both T-Dog and Lori's deaths were heroic by design and reflected their personal lives. Mazzara stated that T-Dog's stint as a football player became evident as "he just heroically acts as a linebacker and just clotheslines these walkers, even at his own expense." Regarding Lori's demise, he professed that childbirth was heroic: "That heroism of a woman giving birth and paying a price and just being focused on the survival of her children is a beautiful story, and a story that's actually taken place millions of times throughout history." In his article for Entertainment Weekly, Darren Franich linked facets of Lori's death to the Book of Job and suggested that it acted as a "triple" catharsis for the character. Franich perceived Lori's extramarital affair with Shane Walsh (Jon Bernthal) as an allegorical allusion to Original Sin—a Christian theological concept of damnation—which then transitions into an "optimistic New Testament vision of hope" as Lori comes to terms with her destiny. "She was confident, and fearless, and heroic," Franich concluded in his review for "Killer Within".

Hudson observed tribalism as a trope in "Killer Within", which he ascribed to the reluctance of Maggie, Rick, and others in the group to allow Oscar and Axel into their clan. The Los Angeles Times journalist noted that these characters had been severed from the cultural and social fabric of their past civilization for so long that they have reverted to "traveling in a small, tightly knit group, hunting and gathering, and regarding anyone who isn't part of their it as a deadly threat."

== Reception ==
=== Ratings ===
The episode's initial broadcast attracted 9.27 million viewers, significantly down from the previous episode, which amassed 10.51 million viewers. "Killer Within" acquired a 4.9 rating in the 18-49 demographic. Despite steep decreases in weekly ratings, the episode was the night's top cable program in terms of ratings, beating out Real Housewives of Atlanta and Breaking Amish by a considerable margin. In the United Kingdom, "Killer Within" garnered 893,000 viewers, the most-viewed television program of the week on FX.

=== Critical response ===
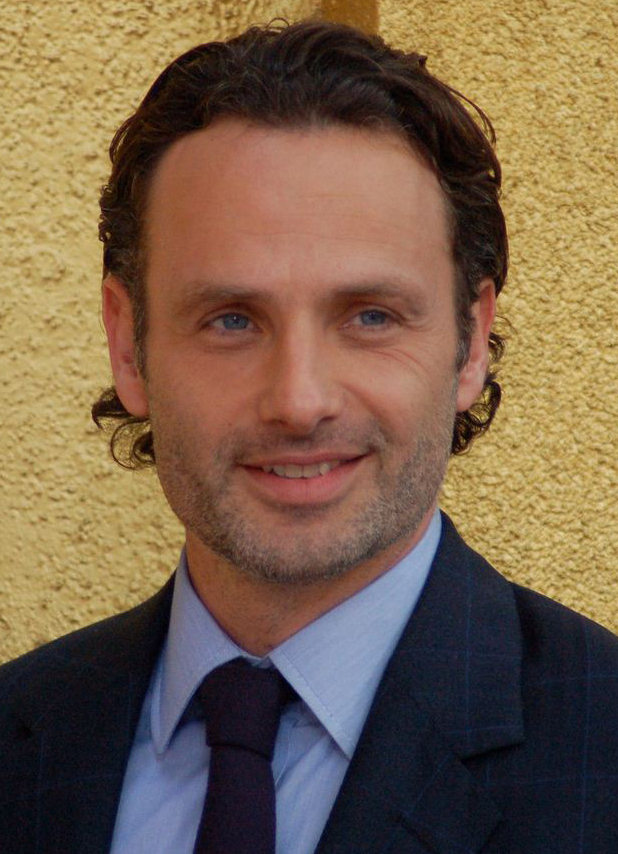
Commentators applauded Andrew Lincoln's performance in the episode.

"Killer Within" was lauded by television commentators. The Washington Post entertainment journalist Jen Chaney said that "Killer Within" offered the "most emotionally upsetting development" in the series to date, a sentiment echoed by Time's Nate Rawlings, who argued that the episode was The Walking Dead's most powerful installment since "Beside the Dying Fire". Bex Schwartz wrote in her review for Rolling Stone magazine that "Killer Within" was the program's best episode to date. The Huffington Post's Maureen Ryan described it as a "taut, terrifically paced hour" with an "incredibly powerful ending", while Eric Goldman of IGN called it "an incredibly tense [and] unrelenting" episode in his 9.5 out of 10 review.

The fates of Lori and T-Dog garnered favorable reviews from television commentators. According to HitFix writer Alan Sepinwall, the moment when Lori and Carl share their goodbyes was the most heartbreaking event since the ending of the second-season episode "Pretty Much Dead Already". Los Angeles Times columnist Laura Hudson felt it was a grim departure for a character who endured long bouts of grief for reasons beyond her control. Erik Kain from Forbes magazine found Lori's death especially difficult to watch, and was shocked by T-Dog's "sudden" death despite the fact that he "was never as prominent a figure" on the program. "As hard as these deaths were to watch," Kain wrote, "they also give me faith in the show." Even though he stated that T-Dog died "a hero's death", Michael Rapoport of The Wall Street Journal concluded that Lori's "gut-churning" demise was the more memorable.

Lori's demise was featured in The Huffington Post's list of "The Biggest 'OMG' TV Moments of 2012", and placed nineteenth in Slate's article covering the year's most noteworthy television moments. Journalist Chris Kirk said that the segment was "utterly surprising", and pointed out that the writers beguiled viewers by shedding light onto Lori's crumbled relationship with Rick.

Some reviewers presented more negative critiques. Ted Pigeon of Slant asserted that, although the latter half of the installment contained some of the show's most touching material, the methodology behind its narratives was "all too apparent". Zack Handlen of The A.V. Club in his review felt the episode "stumble[d]" in how T-Dog and Lori were eliminated and in how the Woodbury storyline repeated what was already known. Handlen commented in his B+ review that "killing T-Dog and Lori earned the show an immediate thrill, but it also meant crossing off two potential sources of drama, people who had a history on the series, however thin or poorly developed that history might have been."

The performances of The Walking Dead ensemble was a frequent topic in the critiques. Lincoln's performance received kudos from various media outlets including HitFix, Rolling Stone, and Slate. To Goldman, Lincoln's collapsing onto the ground was a "suitably powerful and evocative" gesture that epitomized the essence of the series. In addition, the IGN writer commended Callies, Riggs, and Cohan for their performances in "Killer Within". Sepinwall added that Callies "absolutely sold" the portrayal of a mother saying "goodbye to the son who had to grow up much too quickly".
