= The Prisoners (The Walking Dead) =

- The Walking Dead character
- The prisoners depicted in the television series (left) and comic book series (right).
- First appearance: Comic: "Issue #13" (2004); Television: "Seed" (2012)
- Last appearance: Comic: "Issue #75" (2010); Television: "Sick" (2012) (Big Tiny & Tomas); "Killer Within" (2012) (Andrew); "Made to Suffer" (2012) (Oscar); "Home" (2013) (Axel)
- Adapted by: Glen Mazzara (The Walking Dead)
- Portrayed by: Lew Temple (Axel); Vincent M. Ward (Oscar); Markice Moore (Andrew); Theodus Crane (Big Tiny); Nick Gomez (Tomas)

In-universe information
- Members: Axel; Andrew; Comic: Dexter; Thomas Richards; Television: Oscar; Big Tiny; Tomas

The Prisoners are fictional characters from the comic book series The Walking Dead and the television series of the same name.

== Appearances ==
=== Comic book series ===
During Rick's coma, due to the news broadcasts, the inmates and guards had a basic understanding of what was going on. Soon, many of the guards abandoned the prison and the inmates to fend for themselves; at about the same time, a few walkers had somehow gotten inside and began to kill the inmates. Several of the guards freed the inmates and joined to fight their way out, resulting in heavy casualties. By the time Rick and his group discovered the prison, there were only four survivors left who were locked up inside the cafeteria.

The two groups come into conflict after one of them, Thomas Richards, kills two of the survivors, Rachel and Susie Greene, Hershel Greene's two youngest twin daughters. Dexter is falsely accused of the crime due to him being the "only" prisoner who was arrested for murder (it is later revealed that Thomas was arrested for murder as well and initially lied about being arrested for committing tax fraud). Thomas also tries to kill Andrea who is left without an earlobe and two scars as well as Patricia. Rick saves Andrea who beats Thomas brutally, and the second attempted murder on Patricia's life is stopped by a vengeful Maggie, who empties her entire firearm magazine into Thomas. At Hershel's request, Thomas' body is thrown to the zombie hordes outside of the prison where it's devoured by the undead masses. Later, Thomas' corpse can briefly be seen outside the prison gates, devoured down to the bone. A walker gets its intestine caught on Thomas' skeleton and trips.

After Thomas is killed, Dexter and Andrew try to kick out Rick's group, resulting in walkers flooding the courtyard. During the struggle, Rick shoots Dexter in the head, covering it up as friendly-fire, and Andrew surrenders, running outside the gates to die.

Axel, the only prisoner to side with Rick, joins the group and later becomes a vital and trusted member of the group until he is killed during the second assault on the Prison from Woodbury.

In The Fall of the Governor, Andrew is discovered to have become a zombie and he is killed by Lilly Caul.

=== Telltale Series ===
In the opening scene of the first season of The Walking Dead video game a police officer tells Lee Everett about how he had once transported Thomas Richards to prison after Thomas was convicted of murdering his wife. According to the cop, Thomas had insisted begging and pleading that it was all just a big mistake. However, the officer recalls Thomas as one of the worst that he had ever transported, stating that Thomas was guilty for sure as the cops had caught him red-handed cutting up his wife's body after the murder.

=== Television series ===
The prisoners' debut in "Sick" where they witness Rick amputating the lower portion of Hershel's leg after he is bitten by walkers. Rick makes a deal with the Prisoners to clear out a cell block for them in exchange for half of their food. Tomas brutally kills Big Tiny after he is scratched by a walker, despite the latter's pleas that he doesn't feel any effects. Tomas tries twice to assassinate Rick while clearing out the cells, so Rick kills Tomas with his machete, and chases Andrew, and locks him in a courtyard full of walkers. Rick, Daryl, and T-Dog hold Axel and Oscar at gunpoint; Axel begs for his life, but Oscar refuses to beg. Rick's group shows mercy on them and allows them to stay in the prison, though he and Oscar are told to stay in another block. Oscar and Axel find it very disturbing to stay with their deceased inmates and begs Rick to let them stay. T-Dog sympathizes with the prisoners and asks Rick to let them join the group, but Rick is adamant about keeping to their earlier compromise. Later, a horde of walkers is let into the prison courtyard, resulting in the deaths of T-Dog and Lori. When the prison's sirens sound off, Oscar explains that the backup generators are powering the alarms, and takes Rick to shut them down. Andrew, who survived and is revealed to have let the walkers loose and turned on the alarms, attacks Rick in the generator room and tries to convince Oscar to kill Rick only for Oscar to kill Andrew instead, Oscar and Axel are then allowed to stay with the others. Axel and Oscar helps dig graves for those who died during the walker attack. Axel volunteers to go to Woodbury, but stays behind to protect the prison. Oscar instead decides to go. During his plan to rescue Glenn Rhee and Maggie Greene, members of Rick's group, Oscar is shot dead by a Woodbury soldier. At the prison, Axel soon tries to win the favor of the group by trying to stir up conversations and takes a liking to Beth and Carol, flirting with them both. He is later shown saddened by Oscar's death. Axel, Hershel, and Beth, visit new arrivals Tyreese, Sasha, Allen, and Ben. He helps the group fortify the prison, and becomes friendly with Carol by telling her stories of his criminal past. He reveals that he was sentenced for trying to rob a convenience store with a toy gun, but the police did not believe him and found his brother's gun and assumed it to be the real weapon and he was incarcerated. He is killed by The Governor by a shot to the head as part of a surprise attack initiating his assault on the prison.

=== The Walking Dead: Destinies ===
While initially clearing out the prison, Daryl and Carol find Andrew inside. The player can either choose to kick Andrew out or allow him to join the group.

No matter if he's allowed to stay or not, Andrew later betrays the group and initiates an attack to take the prison for himself as in the TV series. Depending on the player's choice, Andrew either directly kills Carol or causes Lori's death in childbirth with his actions. In a final duel in the generator room, Andrew is killed by Rick/Shane.

== Casting and television series reception ==
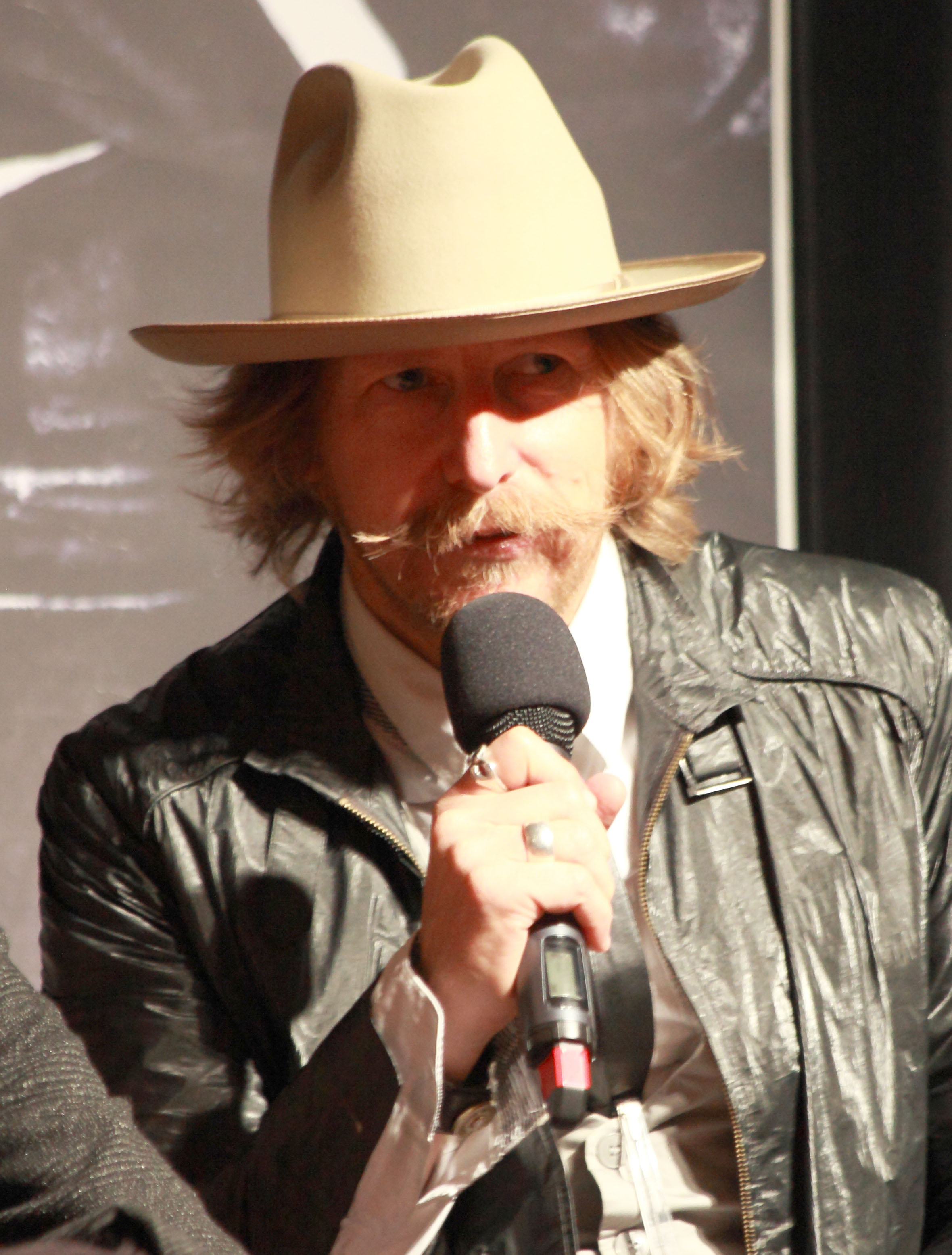
Lew Temple (pictured in 2014) portrayed Axel in the TV series.

Andrew was portrayed by actor and rapper Markice Moore. He had originally auditioned for the pilot episode for the role of T-Dog, which went to IronE Singleton. Moore was later cast on season 3 as Andrew through his agency: "Production was very hush hush about season 3 so I didn't even know I booked it officially until a week before shooting. I was elated; I couldn't believe it when my manager, Gail Tassell called to tell me the good news. I'm a huge fan of the show, it's my favorite show on TV, so yes it was a dream come true." Per Glen Mazzara, "Andrew is really Tomas' right-hand man. These guys are really the ones who have been intimidating Axel and Oscar."

Lew Temple was also cast as Axel. He described him as "a gregarious Southern redneck-biker type, who has big heart" and "a sense of compassion for his fellow man, but he is not as meek as he might appear, and though he has had to survive with four other hardened criminals, sans Oscar, this brave new world is something entirely different for him. He wants to associate and assimilate into the group of survivors, to the point of trying too hard to be accepted. He has a wry sense of humor and ironic quick wit. He will make you laugh and cry in the same offering."

Zack Handlen, writing for The A.V. Club, wrote that "things become sort of uncomfortable" in the scene in "Sick" where Rick chases Andrew into a courtyard full of zombies and locks the door, noting that while Rick does not actually kill Andrew, "it's a cold, cruel move, and it indicates a growing chill in Rick's character". Lesley Goldberg of The Hollywood Reporter noted that in "Killer Within", Rick's decision to lock Andrew out "amid a sea of walkers came back to bite the group in a major way". Glen Mazzara felt that this decision would haunt Rick, as Rick "believed he was committing an act of murder to save the group and that murder led to deaths within his own group and forced his own son to put down his mother". Los Angeles Times columnist Laura Hudson considered the identity of the mysterious figure breaking open the lock on the prison gates to be "not that much of a "mystery" if you consider how many black guys there are running around outside the prison with vendettas against Rick (note: one)". Ted Pigeon of Slant Magazine described the episode's opening sequence: "With its dreamlike, foggy setting and a conspicuously waist-down perspective of the saboteur, a peculiar sense of disconnect underlines the implications of what's being depicted. The scene ends with a single close-up of a heart placed on the cold cement. It's a foreboding image that gains magnitude as "Killer Within" gives way to a sudden strike of tragedy. Moreover, the pre-credit sequence lends insight into how the episode amounts to a particularly poignant, if also problematic, entry in the show's run." Pigeon also notes that the opening segments of the episode "establish the origins for the ensuing chaos while going to painstaking lengths to conceal the identity of the man that caused it". HitFix writer Alan Sepinwall commented on Andrew's sabotage of the prison: "on the one hand, it helps justify Rick's decision to chase after the little guy in the first place. On the other, it seemed like an overly-elaborate plan from someone who probably would have been better off just leaving once he managed to get the gate open." Bex Schwartz wrote in her review for Rolling Stone magazine that when Andrew ("the tiny prisoner") tries to get Oscar to shoot Rick, "Oscar shoots Andrew instead, because Oscar understands life and death and remembers that Andrew was one of the bad dudes". Moore commented on how Andrew died in the series: " It's weird because I have so much fun playing bad guys and I loved the way Andrew went out! He went out like a G, and he took a few people with him! [...] Die Hard TWD fans will remember my character forever because of all the trouble he caused. Plus Andrew almost got Rick! The fight scenes were great! Especially in my death scene."

Handlen, writing for The A.V. Club in his review of "Sick", joked of Oscar and Axel, "I'm sure the remaining prisoners are completely harmless. They said they were harmless—why would they lie?" Showrunner Glen Mazzara commented that in "Killer Within", Axel and Oscar want to be let into the group so they "prove themselves, which is why Oscar takes action and kills Andrew (Markice Moore), so that he can gain access to the group. Throughout the entire season, it's a major theme: Who can Rick let in? Not just into the prison, but let in emotionally." Los Angeles Times columnist Laura Hudson observed tribalism as a trope in "Killer Within", which she ascribed to the reluctance of Maggie, Rick, and others in the group to allow Oscar and Axel into their clan. Hudson noted that these characters had been severed from the cultural and social fabric of their past civilization for so long that they have reverted to "traveling in a small, tightly knit group, hunting and gathering, and regarding anyone who isn't part of their it as a deadly threat." Zack Handlen commented in his review of "Made to Suffer" that "Axel's enthusiasm for getting laid is sending off all kinds of creepy vibes, just the way he got real interested when he found out Beth was 17 could be a bad sign. (His assumption that Carol was a lesbian was kind of funny, though.)"

Lew Temple found out about Axel's death about two weeks before the episode "Home" was filmed: "[Glen Mazzara] had just come down to screen the season 3 premiere episode for cast and crew on location. It was great! It was a lovely evening. We celebrated an amazing kick-off to a great new season. And that particular night was the first time I had met Glen in person. We had a really nice visit about what we were doing with Axel, and he was so effusive and kind and lovely, saying "I really dig how you're bringing Axel out, and the layers that are there. We can go in so many directions because you're keeping things close to the vest and we're not sure what he's about." So I was fairly excited, and I got a call from his assistant the next day saying Glen wanted to speak with me, and I'm like oh, great!, assuming he's going to want to speak more about character development. 15 to 20 seconds into the conversation he says, "Lew, this is really unfortunate but I've got to let you know that Axel is going to take a bullet to the head." Eric Goldman at IGN thought the death of Axel was a huge surprise. Phil Dyess-Nugent, writing for The A.V. Club, commented that in his earlier appearances, "Lew Temple managed to invest Axel with a certain mangy charm, and he really blossoms in this episode; when he's chatting up Carol and shining a little white-trash charm, I found myself thinking, "Shit, I'm glad this guy's around," which is a thought I haven't had about Rick or Glenn or Maggie or Hershel in living memory. Unfortunately, the show itself seems to share Rick's distrust of letting in strangers."

Markice Moore later reprises his role as Andrew in the video game The Walking Dead: Destinies.
