= Sick (The Walking Dead) =

- The Walking Dead episode
- Rick kills the leader of the prisoners, Tomas, who tries to assassinate him.
- Episode no.: Season 3 Episode 2
- Directed by: Billy Gierhart
- Written by: Nichole Beattie
- Cinematography by: Rohn Schmidt
- Editing by: Nathan D. Gunn
- Original air date: October 21, 2012

Guest appearances
- IronE Singleton as Theodore "T-Dog" Douglas; Emily Kinney as Beth Greene; Lew Temple as Axel; Theodus Crane as Big Tiny; Nick Gomez as Tomas; Markice Moore as Andrew; Vincent M. Ward as Oscar

Episode chronology
← Previous "Seed"	Next → "Walk with Me"
- The Walking Dead season 3

"Sick" is the second episode of the third season of the post-apocalyptic horror television series The Walking Dead, which aired on AMC in the United States on October 21, 2012.

== Plot ==
In their haste to amputate Hershel Greene's infected right leg while clearing out the prison, Rick and his group encounter five living prisoners, Tomas (Nick Gomez), Andrew (Markice Moore), Big Tiny (Theodus Crane), Axel (Lew Temple), and Oscar (Vincent M. Ward). Rick, Daryl, and T-Dog keep the prisoners at a distance, learning they have been shut away for the last ten months and were unaware of the extent of the walker epidemic. Tomas believes the prison should be theirs, but Rick asserts that since they spilled blood to clear it, the prison belongs to Rick's group. However, Rick does offer to let the prisoners stay in a separate cell block and split the supplies, threatening them with death if they cross into his group's territory. The group returns to their cell block where Hershel is kept in a separate cell and watched over in case he turns. Rick keeps the prisoners in a locked cell temporarily. Rick later tells Lori he does not trust the prisoners and considers killing them.

Rick offers to help the prisoners clear a cell block and he, Daryl, and T-Dog provide them melee weapons as they show them how to fight off walkers. During this, Big Tiny breaks formation and is scratched in the back by a walker. Unable to save Big Tiny as they had with Hershel, Tomas hacks at Big Tiny with an ax mercilessly to kill him, making Rick and the others uneasy. Later, Tomas disobeys Rick's instructions as they clear out a room, forcing the group to deal with a mass of walkers. In the chaos, Tomas attempts to assassinate Rick twice. Eventually, the walkers are subdued, and Rick confronts Tomas. Tomas claims he was reacting instinctively but Rick drives a machete into Tomas' head, killing him. Andrew reacts by trying to hit Rick with a baseball bat but Rick knocks him down. Andrew runs outside into a courtyard filled with walkers. Rick locks Andrew out, despite his pleas to be let back in. Oscar and Axel profess no knowledge of Tomas' or Andrew's plans and surrender their weapons to Rick's group, and he keeps to his word, letting them stay in the cleared block.

Meanwhile, Carl takes off on his own to get medical supplies from the infirmary, and though successful, is scolded by Lori. Carol has Glenn help her capture a female walker to allow her to practice performing a C-section, as Hershel may not be able to help when Lori goes into labor. They are unaware they are being watched from outside the prison fence by an unknown figure. Hershel starts to show signs of recovery, and is conscious after Rick returns from the other cell block. Later on, Lori tries to strike up an intimate conversation with Rick, who simply thanks her for helping with Hershel, and then walks away.

== Reception ==
=== Critical response ===
The episode was generally well received. Zack Handlen, writing for The A.V. Club, gave the episode a B+ on a scale from A to F. Eric Goldman at IGN gave the episode an 8.0 out of 10.

=== Ratings ===
Upon its initial broadcast on October 21, 2012, "Sick" was watched by an estimated 9.55 million viewers, down from the season premiere which broke several records when it reached 10.9 million viewers, becoming the most-watched scripted drama telecast on a basic cable network in history, and the most-watched episode of the series to date.
