= Beside the Dying Fire =

- The Walking Dead episode
- Rick and Carl burn the barn in order to eliminate all the walkers corralled inside.
- Episode no.: Season 2 Episode 13
- Directed by: Ernest Dickerson
- Written by: Robert Kirkman; Glen Mazzara
- Cinematography by: Rohn Schmidt
- Editing by: Julius Ramsay
- Original air date: March 18, 2012

Guest appearances
- IronE Singleton as Theodore "T-Dog" Douglas; Lauren Cohan as Maggie Greene; Emily Kinney as Beth Greene; Scott Wilson as Hershel Greene; Jane McNeill as Patricia; James Allen McCune as Jimmy; Danai Gurira as A Mysterious Masked Person

Episode chronology
← Previous "Better Angels"	Next → "Seed"
- The Walking Dead season 2

"Beside the Dying Fire" is the 13th and final episode of the second season of the post-apocalyptic horror television series The Walking Dead, which aired on AMC on March 18, 2012. The episode was written by creator Robert Kirkman and showrunner Glen Mazzara, and directed by series regular Ernest Dickerson. In the episode, a huge horde of walkers invades the Greene farm, chasing Rick Grimes (Andrew Lincoln) and Hershel's groups off the premises. Meanwhile, Andrea (Laurie Holden) is separated from the group, leaving her to fight off the same walkers that attacked Hershel's farm.

Themes such as romance, death, and survival are prevalent throughout "Beside the Dying Fire". It is seen as a turning point for the development of several characters on the show, and flashbacks to various previous revelations in the series. "Beside the Dying Fire" features the debut of protagonist Michonne, a character who has been prominently featured in the comics of the same name, and it introduces the prison. Production for the episode transpired over about 8 days.

"Beside the Dying Fire" attracted 9 million viewers and a 4.7 rating in the 18-49 demographic, according to Nielsen ratings. The episode amassed record ratings, thus becoming the highest-rated cable program demographically of all time, an accolade that was previously held by "Nebraska." "Beside the Dying Fire" became the most-viewed cable telecast of the day, as well as the highest-rated cable program of the week.

== Plot ==
The episode opens showing a horde of walkers as they follow a helicopter overhead, leaving Atlanta and migrating to the countryside over several days. As they near the Greene farm, they hear the sound of a gunshot—from the shot that Carl used to kill a reanimated Shane Walsh—and they turn to head toward the farm. As Rick escorts Carl back to the others, the walker horde emerges from the forest, and Rick and Carl take shelter in the barn.

Elsewhere, Daryl Dixon and Glenn report the death and reanimation of Randall to the others, but also that he turned without being bitten. Lori Grimes asks Daryl to go out and search for Rick and Shane. However, they too soon see the walker horde and start arming themselves. While Rick's group is ready to abandon the farm, Hershel Greene intends to protect his land, with his own life if needed. As the group starts to dispatch walkers, Rick and Carl are able to lure a number into the barn, and set it ablaze. Jimmy drives the RV near the barn and allows Rick and Carl to safely escape, but he is killed when the walkers overrun the RV.

The group quickly realizes they are outnumbered, and they all attempt to escape to safety. Patricia is killed as walkers overtake the Greene household, and Rick convinces Hershel to abandon his property as it is a lost cause. Everyone escapes in groups, except for Andrea, who was separated from the others. Unknown to them, she manages to escape the farm, only to run into a mysterious hooded figure who has two armless walker pets and wields a katana.

The surviving group reunites on the highway that they had been taking to reach Fort Benning at the start of the season, and assume Andrea is dead. With their remaining vehicles, they travel on back roads to avoid hordes, until one runs out of gas. They camp for the night, where Daryl pressures Rick on how Randall's body had reanimated without a walker bite. Rick reveals what Dr. Edwin Jenner whispered in his ear: they are all infected carriers of the walker pathogen, and become walkers if they die for any reason which Rick hadn't believed until he saw Shane turn. Rick also reveals to a shocked Lori that he had been forced to kill Shane, and Carl had shot his reanimated form.

As the group continues to debate, the others, save for Daryl and Hershel, start to lose their faith in Rick as a leader. A noise echoing in the distance places the group on high alert, but Rick does not allow anyone to investigate. Carol Peletier urges Rick to take action, causing Rick to snap, saying that he never asked that he be put in charge, and blurting out that he had killed Shane for their sake. He dares anyone to leave the safety of the camp. When nobody leaves, he issues a final warning: "If you're staying, this isn't a democracy anymore," establishing his position as leader of the group. Afterwards, the group is shown to be unknowingly camped near a prison.

== Production ==
"Beside the Dying Fire" was directed by Ernest Dickerson and written by creator Robert Kirkman and showrunner Glen Mazzara. Mazzara teased the episode in a conference call with various journalists: "We're proud of this finale, we've been building to it all season, and we can't wait for you to see it. [...] There's more bloodshed coming. They thought they were safe on this farm, they were wrong. [...] We're on a killing spree here. [...] There are answers about the nature of the virus in the finale. [...] I will guarantee people will watch this finale and want to know what comes next. People will have a lot of questions, but in a good way."

The episode filmed for eight days. In one sequence, Carl Grimes sparks up a cigarette lighter and drops it onto a horde of walkers after Rick creates a diversion to distract the walkers. Greg Nicotero, the special-effects director for The Walking Dead, used black panels to capture the elements of the fire; this enabled them to edit the flames onto the walkers. To reduce the chances of getting burned, the stuntmen put on several layers of flame retardant suits. The first layer consisted of a dry Nomex undergarment; this was followed by several layers of Nomex clothing that were gelled. Since the sequence was conducted on multiple occasions, the stuntmen were coated with gel containing cationic polymers. The last layer was a raincoat, which would separate the gel from the stuntmen's clothing and allowed them to be engulfed in flames for several seconds without injury.

"Beside the Dying Fire" features the deaths of Patricia and Jimmy, who were both consumed by walkers. Alongside the deaths of the aforementioned characters, the episode's script initially called for the deaths of Hershel, as well as Shane Walsh and Randall, both of whom had died in the previous installment. Since Kirkman felt that considerable potential for development existed in Hershel, his death was scrapped from the script. Although plans to write off the character commenced earlier in the season, Mazzara opined that his hypothetical death would have carried no emotional resonance. "The plan was always to whack Hershel, and I actually told Scott Wilson, 'Thanks for everything you've done, but in the next script we're going to kill off your character.' We started writing that and it felt like Hershel's death was playing as a plot device and we were getting no emotional resonance. It was just playing as a gratuitous death. This was one of those examples where we won't play a shocking death for the sense of death; we have to get something out of it. We got nothing out of it. If you look at the shot of Hershel looking back and seeing that barn burning and his farm completely lost to the zombies, that shot was well worth it because we see the farm was really a character and you can only see that through Hershel's eyes. So it was the right call to keep him alive."

The night on which "Beside the Dying Fire" was so cold, the editors had to digitally remove vapor expelled by the walkers.

This episode introduces the character Michonne, a protagonist in the comic series of the same name who is portrayed by Danai Gurira. Gurira was cast as part of the series a week before the broadcasting of "Beside the Dying Fire", although rumors of introducing Michonne circulated months prior to the season finale. Kirkman admitted that he was a fan of her work in the HBO drama series Treme. Rutina Wesley, who played Tara Thornton in True Blood, was rumored to be considered for the role of Michonne, although Kirkman stated that she was never involved in the auditioning process. "It was a lot of actresses. The True Blood actress, I don't know that she was even available; I think she's still on True Blood. I don't know where that rumor came from, but to my knowledge, she was never involved."

In the conclusion of "Beside the Dying Fire", a large prison is seen in the background hovering over the survivors' temporary settlement. Bear McCreary composed a score for the sequence, which he thought would lay the groundworks for a future theme for the location. "There's something really powerful there that could become, sort of like a heartbeat-like theme for this location, which is kind of similar to what I had in mind when I read the comics years ago when I first got there," he asserted. "I had been thinking about it, there's so many great prison shows and movies and there are certain sounds you kind of associate with it, and I don't want to do that. But, we'll see. I mean it really depends on where they take the show. It's a little early to think about it, but I'm definitely thinking about it anyway."

== Themes ==
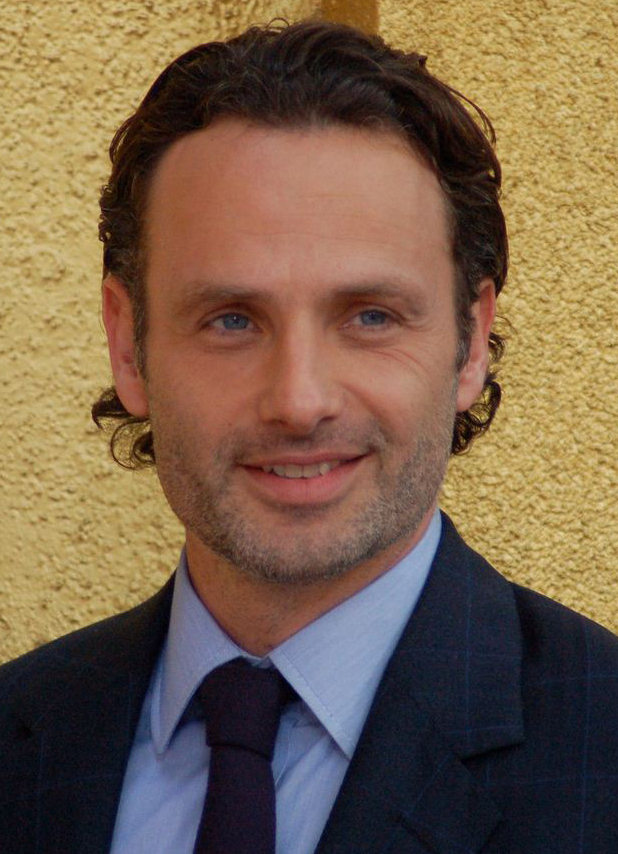
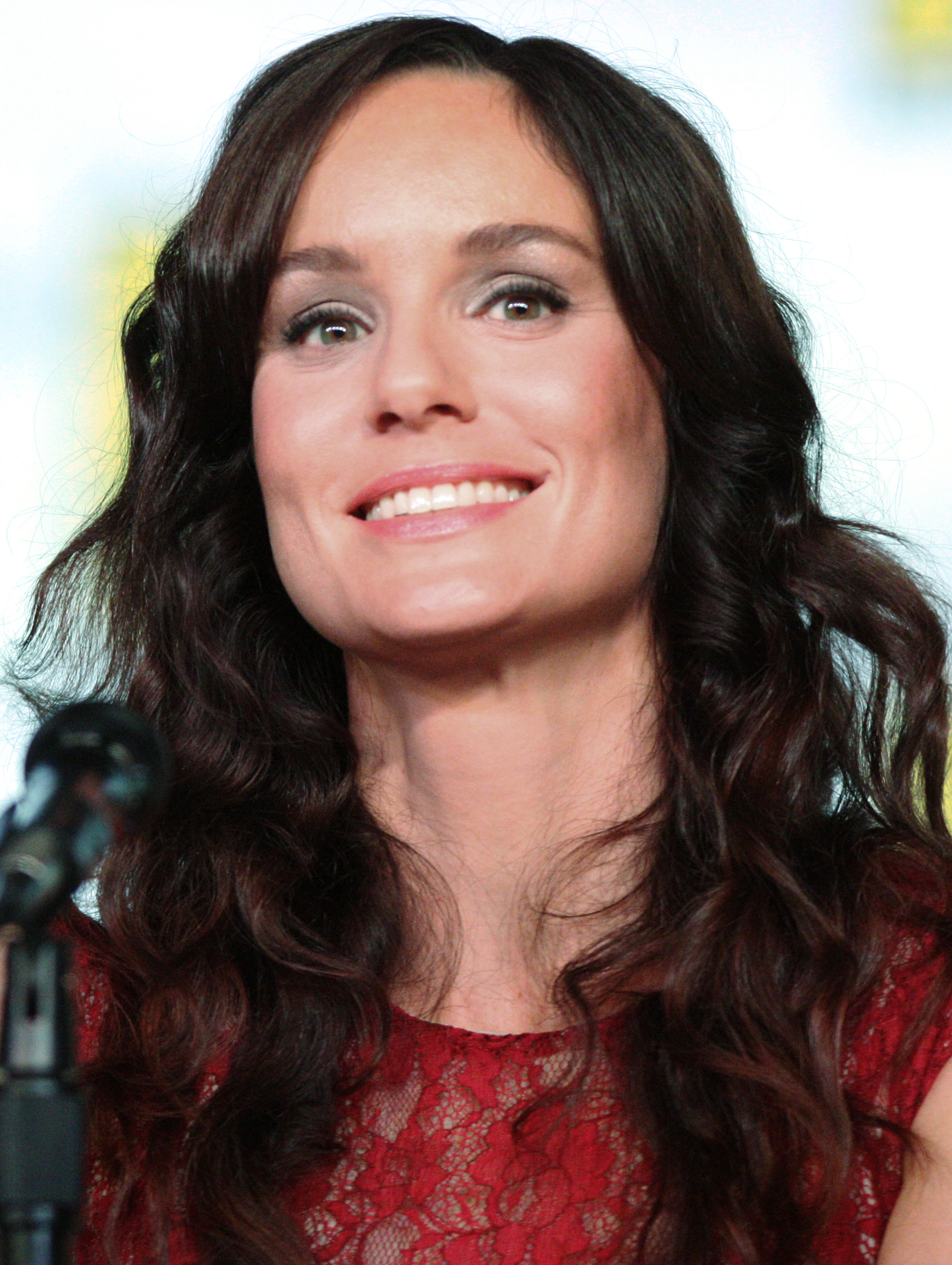
"Beside the Dying Fire" has been seen as a transitioning stage for future development on the show, including the marriage between Rick (Andrew Lincoln, left) and Lori (Sarah Wayne Callies, right).

"Beside the Dying Fire" is seen as a transitional stage for several characters in the series. The transformation of Rick Grimes to a dark character continues in the episode. He has changed from the person who wanted to save Merle Dixon (in season one) and find Sophia Peletier (first half of season two), to the person who is willing to abandon any hope of finding Andrea. Furthermore, Rick yells at his group for being unappreciative of his sacrifices as a leader. This backlash and hostility have been interpreted as a foreshadowing event for future development for The Walking Dead. "Rick is clearly in a much darker place now than he was at the start of the season," concluded Entertainment Weekly writer Darren Franich. In a similar fashion, Lori Grimes is furious at Rick after he admits that he killed Shane Walsh. According to Kirkman, "it looks pretty clear that he has lost [Lori and Carl] by doing this" at the end of "Beside the Dying Fire." In response to the interactions between Rick and Lori, he opined: "I think he feels that he has sacrificed for this group, and that sacrifice hasn't really been appreciated. His confession to Lori did not get the reaction that he had hoped. He thought she would be supportive. Instead, she reacts in a particular way that he feels is hatred and disgust. I think that's really affecting him. Let's not forget: This is taking place hours after he murdered his best friend. So he is still reeling. He's trying to keep that a secret. He opens his heart to his wife, and it doesn't go well. So I think that he's just done with these people. I think he doesn't want to be the leader. As he says: If they don't like it, they're free to leave."

The episode flashbacks to the previous developments of several storylines throughout the season, including the love triangle between Rick, Shane, and Lori. Mazzara iterated that upon hearing of her husband's revelations, Lori was conflicted with several issues. "All of that is going through Lori's mind. Rick murdered Shane and she did confess she had feelings for Shane. Her son was a part of it. They're all infected. Is her baby infected? We're out on the road, where is she going to give birth? What happens if the baby dies? What happens if she dies? All of these questions are going through her head. The thing that affects her most is that she played a role in Shane's death. She put those two men at odds, she whispered in Rick's ear and then she talked to Shane at the windmill. She realizes that this has been over her, and in a sense she has been an active participant in Shane's death. So she can blame Rick for that, but she's horrified by her own culpability."

"Beside the Dying Fire" reminiscences to the first-season finale, "TS-19", in that Rick reveals that everyone in the group is infected with the virus. Although Kirkman described his actions as "exhibiting good leadership skills," Mazzara said that the group began to question Rick's capabilities as a leader. "He presents them with a very pragmatic option: If you don't like it, get the hell out and there are no takers. At the end of the finale, the true horror is Rick when he says, 'It ain't a democracy anymore.' That's the true horror."

Themes of Social Darwinism and survival are prevalent throughout "Beside the Dying Fire". In the episode, Andrea is separated from the group and is forced to fend herself against the horde of walkers that invaded Hershel's farm. Mazzara felt that separating Andrea from her group would be essential in exploring her character in-depth, as he stated that she was viewed in the light of other characters on The Walking Dead.

== Reception ==
=== Ratings ===
"Beside the Dying Fire" was originally broadcast on March 18, 2012, in the United States on AMC. Upon airing, the episode attained 9 million viewers and a 5.8 household rating, indicating that 5.8% of all households who watched television viewed the episode. The episode attained a 4.7 rating in the 18-49 demographic, denoting 6 million viewers, while simultaneously acquiring 3.2 million viewers in the 18-34 demographic and 5 million in the 25–54 demographic. "Beside the Dying Fire" subsequently became the highest-rated cable telecast of all time demographically, amassing record ratings among adults and men between 18 and 54; this accolade was previously held by the second-season episode "Nebraska." Similarly, it outperformed all cable programming of the day as well as the week dated March 25, obtaining significantly higher ratings than Swamp People on History and Jersey Shore on MTV. Total viewership and ratings for "Beside the Dying Fire" increased dramatically from the previous episode, "Better Angels," which attracted 6.89 million viewers and a 3.6 rating among key adults in the 18-49 group.

=== Critical response ===
Rob Salem of Toronto Star said that "fans who have been complaining about this season's relative complacency [...] finally got their gore and more when the farm was overrun by suddenly, strangely single-minded walkers." Pamela Mitchell of Houston Chronicle commented that "Beside the Dying Fire" was the most eventful episode of the season, while Digital Spy's Morgan Jeffery thought that "every single major character gets their moment to shine"; "Epic, action-packed, emotional—'Beside the Dying Fire' is great television," she concluded. TV Guide television critic Michael Logan affirmed that the season finale "was so scary and shock-a-minute outrageous that it nearly made our heads explode." In his A− review, Zach Handlen of The A.V. Club said that "Beside the Dying Fire" adequately accomplished what he was hoping for. He wrote, "We're finally off Hershel's farm, in about the most definitive way imaginable: The barn has been burned, and the house itself is overrun by a herd of 'walkers'." New York's Starlee Kine adulated the installment, and asserted that it was comparable to episodes of The Walking Dead's first season. "It's just amazing how much smoother the plot holes go down when something is actually happening on this show. For the first time since last season, I felt engrossed enough to not be consumed with all the small things this show gets wrong. Up until this episode, the majority of this season has consisted exclusively of small things: petty dramas, misdirected stakes, so much stalling. I'm not sure I can go so far as to say that it got everything right with this one, but at least it was entertaining and the nonstop action felt like content instead of just bookends." Mark A. Perigard of the Boston Herald wrote that it was the closest the program "ever resembled the climax of a George Romero film." Time journalist Nate Rawlings felt that "Beside the Dying Fire" sufficiently encompassed a climax for its storylines, adding that it left the audience anticipating for future installments of the series.

Last night's The Walking Dead season finale did that wonderfully, wrapping up several loose threads before pointing the compass directly at the heart of Season 3. In a closing shot similar to that of this season's penultimate episode, the producers literally glanced over the horizon at a giant prison, which I'm willing to bet elicited one of two reactions. If you've read the graphic novels, you probably said, "It's about damn time!," whereas if you're a TWD novice, your take was probably some variation on "What the f— was that?" This is the balance the producers wanted to strike, and they did it brilliantly.

— Nate Rawlings, Time

Gina McIntyre of Los Angeles Times said that the program delivered what she described as a "blood bath," and Aaron Rutzkoff of The Wall Street Journal further analyzed that the episode followed a dark and frenetic convention "with flare." The Washington Post commentator Jen Chaney opined that "Beside the Dying Fire" evoked elements of various films of George A. Romero, as well as the historical epic film Gone with the Wind (1939). Writing for Paste, Josh Jackson issued the episode an 8.8 out of 10 rating, signifying a "commendable" rating. "'Beside the Dying Fire' wasted no time getting straight to the action, assuming a season's worth of character development was more than enough." The Huffington Post's Maureen Ryan echoed synonymous sentiments, ultimately declaring that the telecast was the best since the series' pilot episode, "Days Gone Bye." Ryan summated: "The first two acts of The Walking Dead Season 2 finale were full of excitement, honest to God suspense and characters who came up with pretty decent plans on the fly. When the braaaains finally hit the fan at Hershel Greene's farm, my pulse quickened and I found myself wondering and even caring about the survival of characters who'd done little more than irritate me for weeks." Julia Rhodes from California Literary Review uttered that the show returned to form in "Beside the Dying Fire," while Buddy TV writer Megan Cole summed up the episode as "intense."

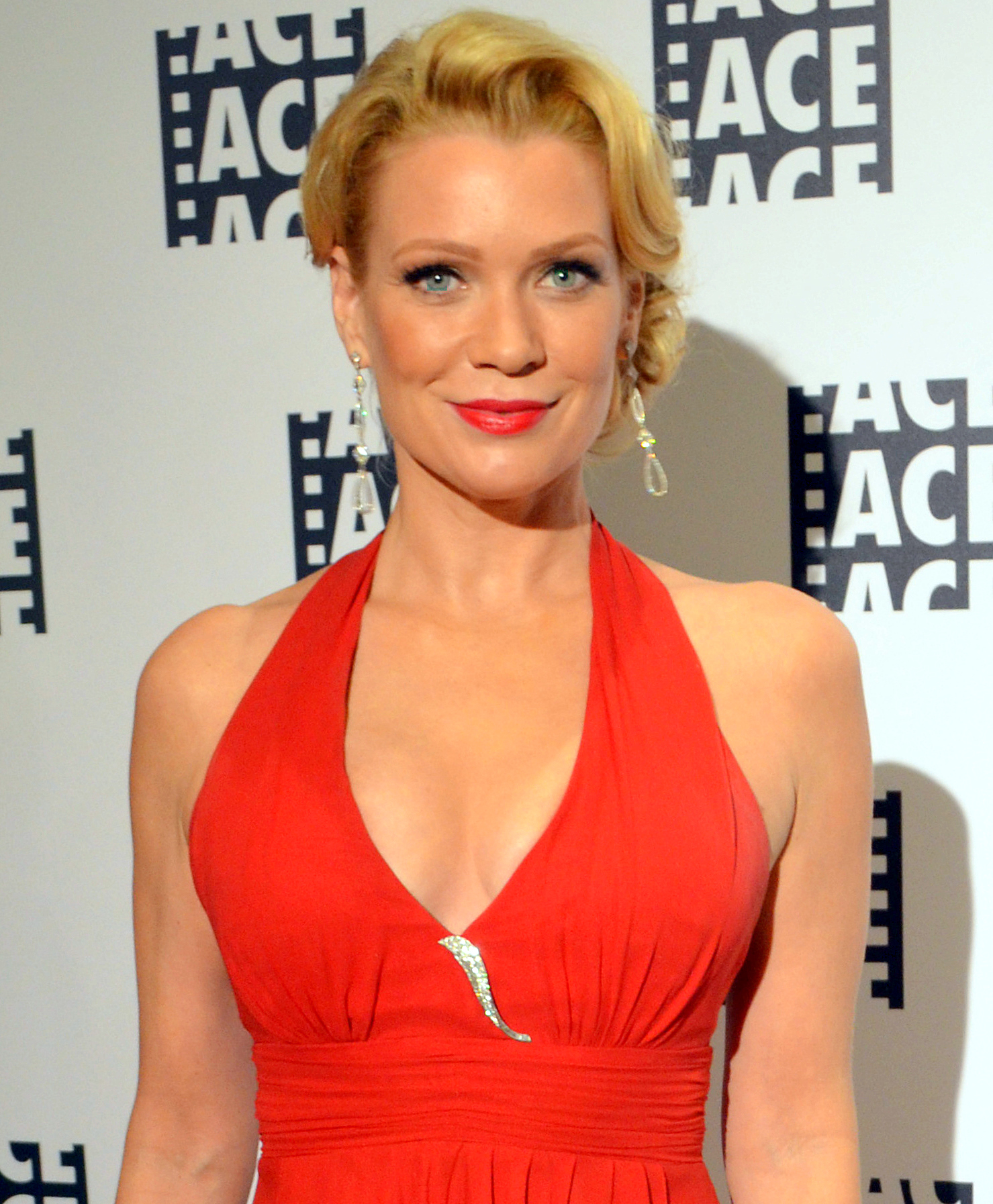
Critics were keen to the character progression of Andrea (Laurie Holden, pictured).

The character development of Andrea produced uniform praise among critics. Jackson felt that it served as the episode's highlight, and further assessed that she emulated actress Linda Hamilton. "After a season of whining, there had to have been at least a few fans pulling for the walkers in her early scenes, but she quickly became Linda Hamilton-badass, braining zombies with her foot," he said. Likewise, Kine asserted that "the badass she has tried so hard to convince us all she is finally came across." Ryan thought that Andrea's struggle to survive was a strong way to build up the exodus of the group. She spoke of her scene with Michonne: "She'd fought so hard to live that I wanted Andrea to fend off that final batch of walkers successfully. When it appeared she might not live, I was, quite rightly, on the edge of my seat. And the appearance of the caped figure—towing two armless walkers, no less—was as dramatic as could be."

The gradual alteration of Rick was frequently mentioned in the critiques. Dan Hopper of Best Week Ever theorized that such a drastic transition was attributed by the death of his friend Shane. Halden proclaimed that the progression established a strong sense of direction for the character. "This is a definite direction. I'm not sure if the show's going to make Rick an out-and-out monster, or if this is setting up some sort of redemptive arc for him in season three, but it's a strong choice. The Walking Dead has tried to make us value this group of people, as if together, they mean more than they do alone. That hasn't worked, so now it appears we're going to try trial by fire." By the end of "Beside the Dying Fire," Ryan concluded that "Rick is becoming the leader he should have been from the start, and he's being clear and upfront about his goals and leadership style."

Commentators were divided with the interactions between Rick and his wife Lori. Although Ryan reacted positively to Lincoln's performance, she affirmed that the contradictory nature of Lori almost ruined the scene. Similarly, Kine criticized Callies' facial expressions during the sequence. Jackson wrote, "If that was a challenge from the writers, though, Sarah Wayne Callies has to feel like they're just messing with her at this point. Her character, Lori, basically tells Rick that Shane needs to be put down, and then treats him like a monster when he's forced to follow through with it."
