= What Lies Ahead =

- The Walking Dead episode
- The group on the trail in search of Sophia.
- Episode no.: Season 2 Episode 1
- Directed by: Ernest Dickerson; Gwyneth Horder-Payton
- Written by: Frank Darabont; (as Ardeth Bey); Robert Kirkman
- Cinematography by: David Boyd
- Editing by: Julius Ramsay; Hunter M. Via
- Original air date: October 16, 2011
- Running time: 63 minutes

Guest appearances
- IronE Singleton as Theodore "T-Dog" Douglas; Madison Lintz as Sophia Peletier

Episode chronology
← Previous "TS-19"	Next → "Bloodletting"
- The Walking Dead season 2

"What Lies Ahead" is the second season premiere episode of the post-apocalyptic horror television series The Walking Dead. It originally aired on AMC in the United States on October 16, 2011. It was written by series developer Frank Darabont (under the pseudonym "Ardeth Bey") and series creator Robert Kirkman, and directed by Gwyneth Horder-Payton and Ernest Dickerson. In this episode, Rick Grimes (Andrew Lincoln) leads his group toward Fort Benning, Georgia, but during an encounter with a horde of walkers, Sophia Peletier (Madison Lintz) goes missing, and a search group is formed.

"What Lies Ahead" was the last episode written by Darabont, who had been fired from the show in July 2011. It was first previewed at San Diego Comic-Con on July 22, 2011. Production commenced in June 2011. Unlike the first season, most of the principal photography for "What Lies Ahead" took place outside the city limits of Atlanta, Georgia; filming took place in Smyrna and Henry County, Georgia. Before its first airing, several segments were announced and broadcast, including a six-part internet series and a live after-show hosted by Chris Hardwick.

"What Lies Ahead" was well received by television critics, who said it made a strong start to the season. Ratings were similarly positive: in the United States, it broke the record for the most-watched drama in the history of basic cable, attaining 7.3 million viewers. Worldwide, it averaged a 2.0 rating in most television markets.

== Plot ==
Rick Grimes leads the group of survivors from Atlanta toward Fort Benning following the destruction of the CDC there. Rick attempts to contact Morgan Jones but cannot reach him.

Along a highway, the group is forced to stop as a number of abandoned cars litter the road, making it impossible to pass; further, Dale must stop to fix his RV. As the others push cars out of the way and scavenge for supplies, a horde of walkers appears behind them. The group take shelter under cars to avoid conflict, though in his haste, T-Dog severely cuts his arm. Some walkers spot Sophia, daughter of Carol Peletier, hiding under a car, and she flees into the nearby forest. Rick follows her and tells her to find someplace safe to hide while he dispatches the walkers.

The horde soon passes, and the group returns to clearing the road, while Rick and Daryl Dixon attempt to find Sophia. While Rick is gone, Shane Walsh tells Rick's wife Lori that he plans to leave the group on his own accord. Rick and Daryl return unsuccessfully, and the group spends the night to resume the search the next day. Carol berates Rick for losing Sophia.

During the search, Andrea confronts Dale about her decision to stay at the CDC and wanting to die on her own terms, and his choice to stay with her took that chance away from her. The group finds a small church and dispatch the few walkers inside. As Carol prays for the return of her daughter, Andrea overhears Shane arguing with Lori about his leaving, and Andrea tells him she wants to go with him. Rick, seeing the group starting to break apart, questions his leadership abilities and also prays for guidance.

Rick, Shane, and Rick's son Carl go hunting for food, and spot a deer nearby. As Carl goes up closer, a gunshot rings out, and Carl is hit by the bullet after it passes through the deer.

== Production ==
=== Background ===
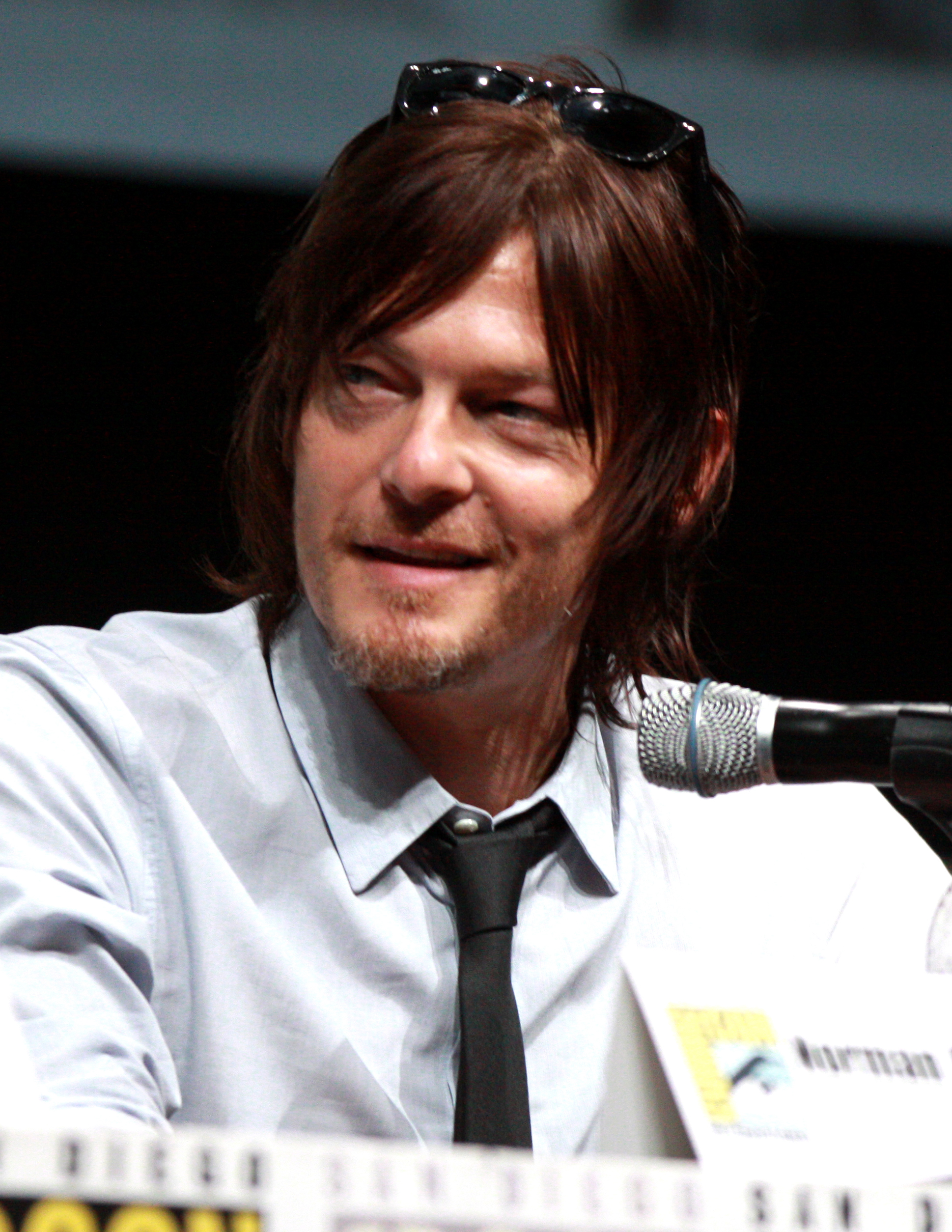
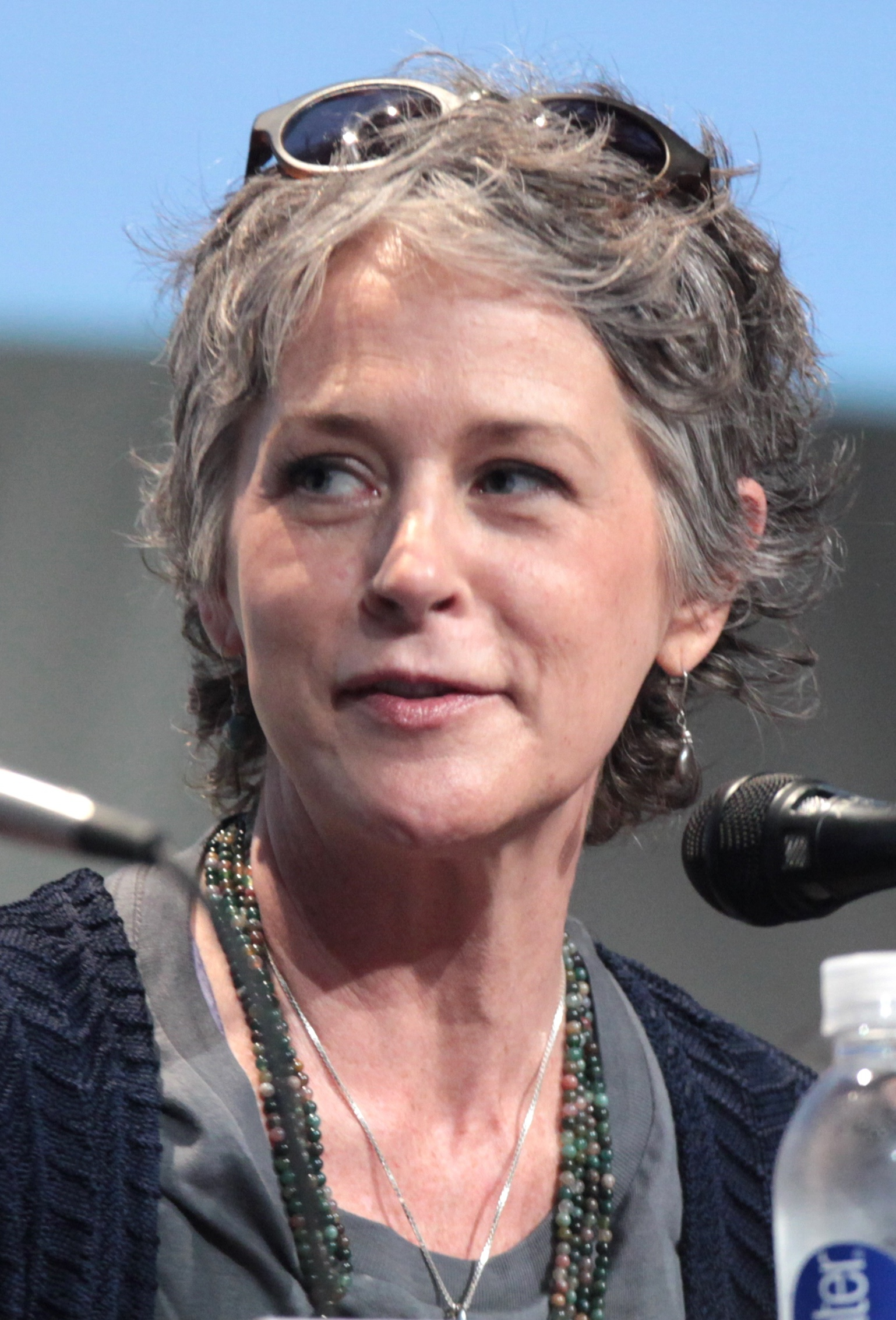
"What Lies Ahead" marks the first appearances of Norman Reedus (left) and Melissa McBride (right) as part of the main cast.

An early concept for the season premiere by Frank Darabont never materialized, allegedly as a result of budget cuts.

This initial idea would have been an episode-long flashback, illustrating the fall of Atlanta and centering on the mission of a doomed soldier who loses his team. Darabont was influenced by the American war film Black Hawk Down (2001). "All they have to do is travel maybe a dozen blocks", he said, "a simple journey, but what starts as a no-brainer scenario goes from 'the city is being secured' to 'holy shit, we've lost control, the world is ending'." The episode would have introduced several characters, including Andrea, Dale, and Amy (Emma Bell).

The concluding scene would have tied into the pilot episode, "Days Gone Bye". Darabont says that the episode shows a soldier dying, hidden in a tank, after which there is a "shot-for-shot reprise from the first episode of the first season". The idea was to tell the soldier's story, because "every zombie has a story". Samuel Witwer, who was cast as the soldier in the pilot for this backstory that would eventually unfold, was frustrated by the story's rejection and questioned the need for such a budget cut.

Ultimately, the premiere written and filmed would begin after the events of Season 1, although a brief flashback scene of Shane and Lori witnessing the fall of Atlanta from a distance would appear during the season.

=== Filming ===
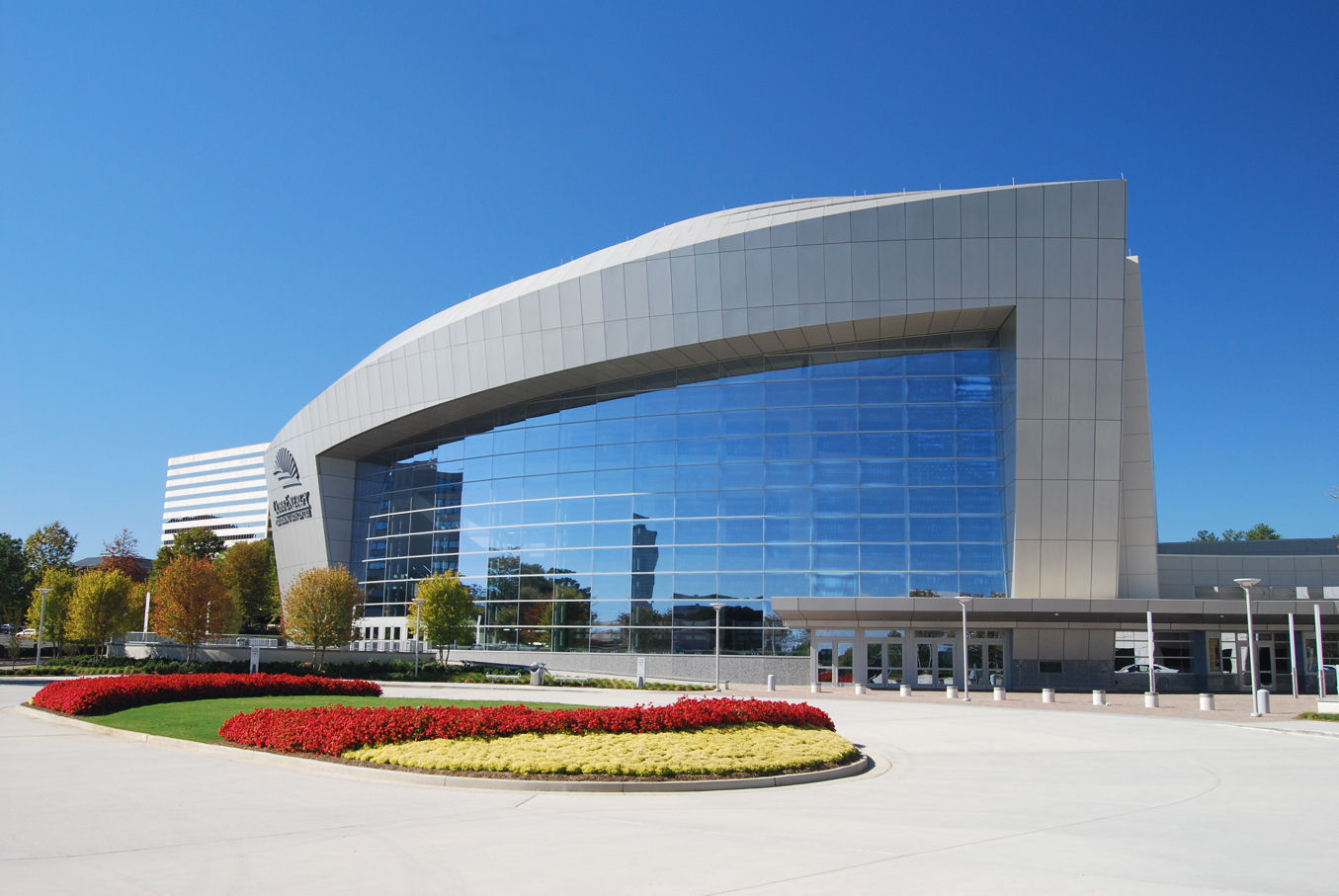
Filming occurred in several locations throughout the Atlanta metropolitan area, including the Cobb Energy Performing Arts Centre in Smyrna, Georgia.

At PaleyFest 2011, it was announced that the second season of The Walking Dead would mainly be produced outside the city limits of Atlanta, Georgia. Most of the principal photography for "What Lies Ahead" took place in unincorporated Henry County, Georgia on June 5–9, 2011, using a stretch of Georgia State Route 20 that was closed to traffic for the purpose. On June 8, 2011, the first promotional image was released. Darabont described the scene: "At this moment, I’m standing on a stretch of post-apocalypse interstate in Georgia, littered with abandoned cars ...".

Principal photography for the episode resumed at the Cobb Energy Performing Arts Centre in Smyrna, Georgia, which was depicted as the headquarters of the CDC. Several neighboring roads were closed for 4 hours for it. Production then moved to a nearby office park, where it commenced over a period of sixteen hours. The scene was later cut from the season premiere prior to its broadcast. In an interview with Entertainment Weekly, series creator Robert Kirkman said that after editing "there were certain things that just got left on the cutting room floor".

=== Editing ===
"What Lies Ahead" is an extended premiere, the result of a decision to combine what were originally designed to be the first two episodes of the season. This led to much of the original first episode, titled "Miles Behind Us," to be discarded, and is also the reason that the premiere contains dual credits for both writer and director.

"Miles Behind Us," which was written by then-showrunner Frank Darabont and directed by Gwyneth Horder-Payton (an alumnus from the first season), began immediately where the Season 1 finale left off, with the group departing the destroyed CDC. Soon after, Shane finds himself left behind when one of the tires of his jeep is punctured. Frantically trying to catch up on foot, he is nearly overrun by a multitude of walkers when he is rescued in the nick of time by the rest of the group, Daryl having noticed Shane's absence in the convoy. Shane reveals to Rick that despite their slow gait, the walkers do not seem to ever tire, knowledge that informs Rick's fateful decision to temporarily leave Sophia.

The group decides to look for refuge with Guillermo's gang at the Atlanta nursing home, last encountered in the episode "Vatos," but arrive to find the location overrun with walkers and the entire group dead. After clearing out the area to spend the night, the group observes that the people were not killed by walkers, but execution-style by human pillagers, in what was likely intended to be foreshadowing of The Governor.

Resolving that they will never again let their guard down, the group decides that they will try to reach Fort Benning, the alternative to the CDC proposed by Shane in the prior season. As in the final version of the episode, a narration scene with Rick speaking to Morgan on the walkie-talkie was included, but was re-shot with modified dialog that served to replace the above material, allowing the premiere to begin with the group putting Atlanta behind them. Rick sports his full sheriff's wardrobe in the reshoot, whereas in the original version he is wearing the white undershirt he was wearing in the Season 1 finale.

"Miles Behind Us" was likely meant to end with Rick returning to the highway to break the news to Carol that Sophia went missing, while in the final version the group is informed by implication, with a search in the woods underway following a commercial break. It is estimated that only about fifteen minutes of the original first episode appears in the final cut, with the balance of the premiere consisting of the "second" episode that was written by Robert Kirkman and directed by Ernest Dickerson.

Many of the deleted scenes from "Miles Behind Us" appear as bonus material on the Season 2 DVD, though it does not include the events leading up to Shane's rescue nor the original rooftop walkie-talkie monologue. Footage can also be seen in the Comic-Con trailer. The original title was seen on early marketing material for the season before the decision was made to "cannibalize" the original premiere into what would become "What Lies Ahead." Following in the tradition established by the pilot, "Miles Behind Us" was taken from the title of the first issue of the second volume of the graphic novel.

In the Season 2 DVD commentary, Robert Kirkman and Glen Mazzara described the decision to retool the premiere in such a dramatic way as an amicable decision agreed upon between both the producers and AMC to make the premiere more of an "event" as well as to push the story forward. However, reports at the time had suggested that the situation was the result of strife between Frank Darabont and AMC, who deemed footage from the first episode "unusable," with some speculating that the network was looking for a "pretense" to oust Darabont due to its ongoing conflict with the showrunner over budget cuts. Darabont was ultimately fired from the show only a few episodes into production ("Ardeth Bey," as he is credited as co-writer on the premiere, is a pseudonym), and Horder-Payton has directed no further episodes of the series.

Not knowing at the time that he would be referring to deleted scenes, Andrew Lincoln told Entertainment Weekly, "I remember going on set for the season premiere and seeing a couple of the prop guys, and they just looked at me as they gave me my gun and they went, 'You know, in this episode we kill more zombies than in the whole of Season 1.' They actually counted the kills! And when it came time for the taking-of-the-courtyard scene, that was just carnage." He added, "It really wasn't that well plotted. We just got sent zombies towards us and we had to improvise stabbing, so it was a bit touch-and-go from time to time."

Similarly, Neil Brown Jr., the actor who played Guillermo, gave an interview where he obliquely referred to possible participation in the Season 2 premiere. This ultimately never made it to the screen.

=== Marketing ===
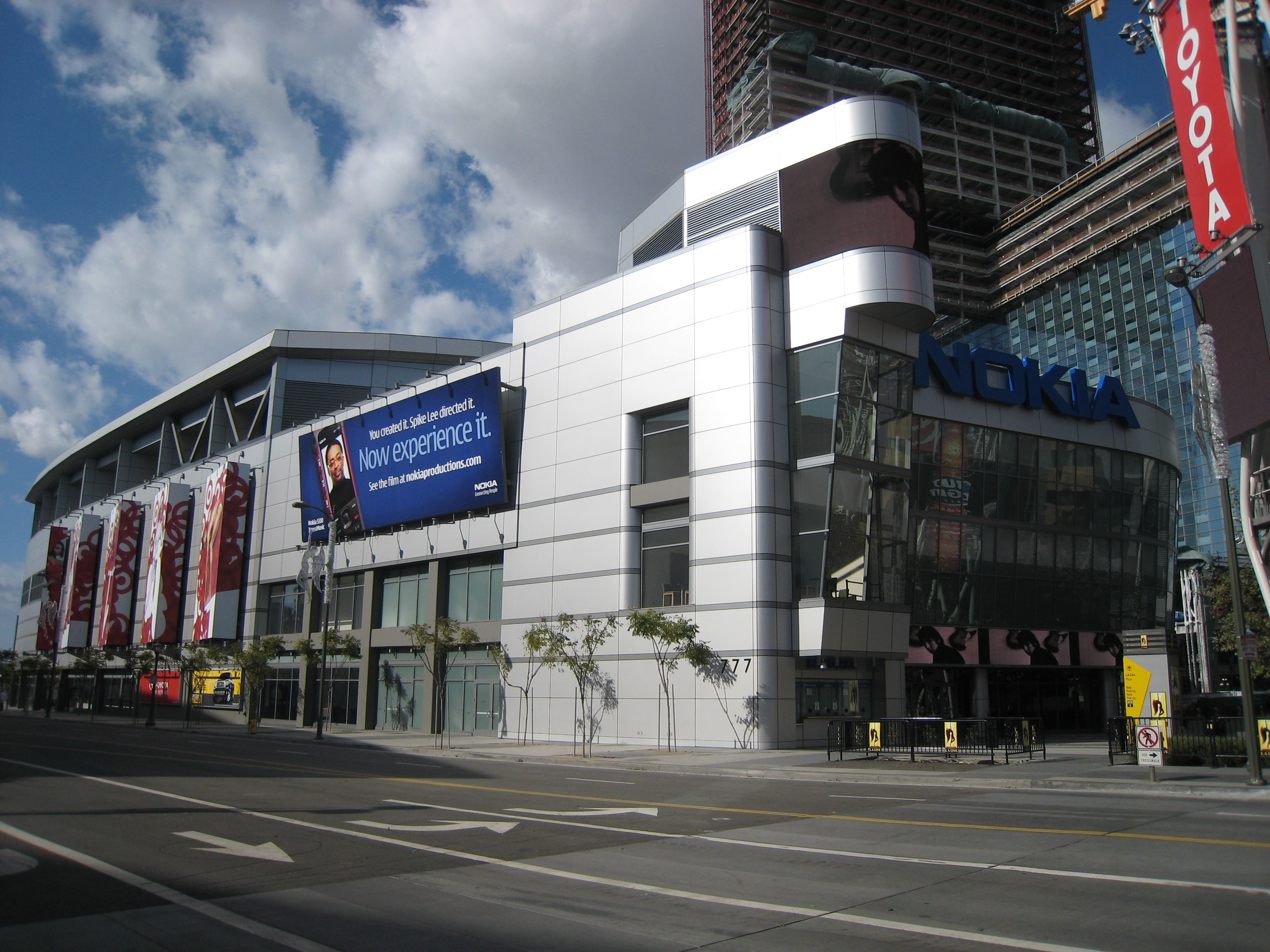
The episode was screened at the Nokia Theatre in Los Angeles, California.

"What Lies Ahead" was heavily promoted in the months before its premiere. A four-minute trailer was released at San Diego Comic-Con on July 22, 2011, and a one-minute preview was broadcast on July 27, 2011, during the season-4 premiere of Breaking Bad, in which Grimes kills two zombies with a rock. A six-part internet series was broadcast on AMC on October 3, 2011. It showed the events before the zombie outbreak from the perspective of a woman named Hannah, who appeared in the first episode. On the same day, a screening of "What Lies Ahead" commenced at the Nokia Theatre in Los Angeles. After the premiere of the episode, a live after-show titled Talking Dead was broadcast, hosted by Chris Hardwick.

This is one of the last episodes of The Walking Dead to feature Darabont as an executive producer and the showrunner. In July 2011 he stepped down as showrunner. Initial reports suggested that he was unable to adjust to the schedule of running a television series, but it was later confirmed that he was fired because of the show's reduced budget and his strained relationship with the executives of AMC. In addition to the main cast, Melissa McBride reprised her role as Carol Peletier, IronE Singleton reprised his role as T-Dog, and Madison Lintz reprised her role as Sophia Peletier. All three were promoted to the recurring cast, as was Norman Reedus.

== Reception ==
=== Ratings ===
"What Lies Ahead" was first broadcast in the United States on October 16, 2011, on AMC. It received 7.3 million viewers and attained a 4.8HH rating, breaking the record for the most-watched drama in the history of cable television. It received the second highest viewership of the week ending October 16, scoring higher than Jersey Shore but less than a 2011 NFL season game between the Detroit Lions and the Chicago Bears. "What Lies Ahead" achieved similar feats, attaining a 3.8 rating—translating to 4.8 million viewers—in the 18–49 demographic, according to Nielsen ratings. In the 25–54 demographic, it garnered 4.2 million viewers. Total viewership after two encore presentations was 11 million viewers, an increase of 38% over the series premiere, "Days Gone Bye", which got 5.35 million viewers on its initial airing. Viewership in the 18–49 demographic showed similar increases, having nearly doubled from the series premiere.

The episode received a similar response in international markets. It premiered in 122 countries in thirty-five languages, with a total viewership of 10 million and an average rating of 2.0 in most metered television markets. It was first broadcast in Spain on October 17, 2011, to an estimated 432,000 viewers, nearly 73% of them in the 18–49 demographic. Total viewership increased 411% from the previous season's premiere. The episode's first UK broadcast received 693,300 viewers and achieved a 2.204 rating in the 18–34 demographic. An estimated 439,800 viewers were in the 18–49 demographic, making it the second highest rated show of the week on FX. Total viewership in Mexico increased by 30% from the previous season's premiere, translating to 296,090. It became the highest-rated program of the night on pay television. It was also the highest-rated pay television program of the night in its timeslot in Colombia, attaining 296,950 viewers and achieving a 2.57 rating in the 18–49 demographic, or 92,240 viewers. In Italy, it was the highest-rated program amongst men in the 18–49 demographic and the second most viewed program in its timeslot.

The episode's performance sparked reactions from several executives of the series' broadcasting affiliates. Hernan Lopez, CEO of Fox International Channels (FIC), commented, "The Walking Dead has gone from phenomenon to pandemic. The numbers that came in [that] week combined with the astounding launch results in the US [told] us that the virus is now out of control." Charlie Collier, president of AMC, felt that The Walking Dead was a rarity that successfully reached its core audience as well as broadening its fanbase, saying, "That The Walking Dead is now the most watched drama in the history of basic cable is staggering, just like our zombies."

=== Critical response ===
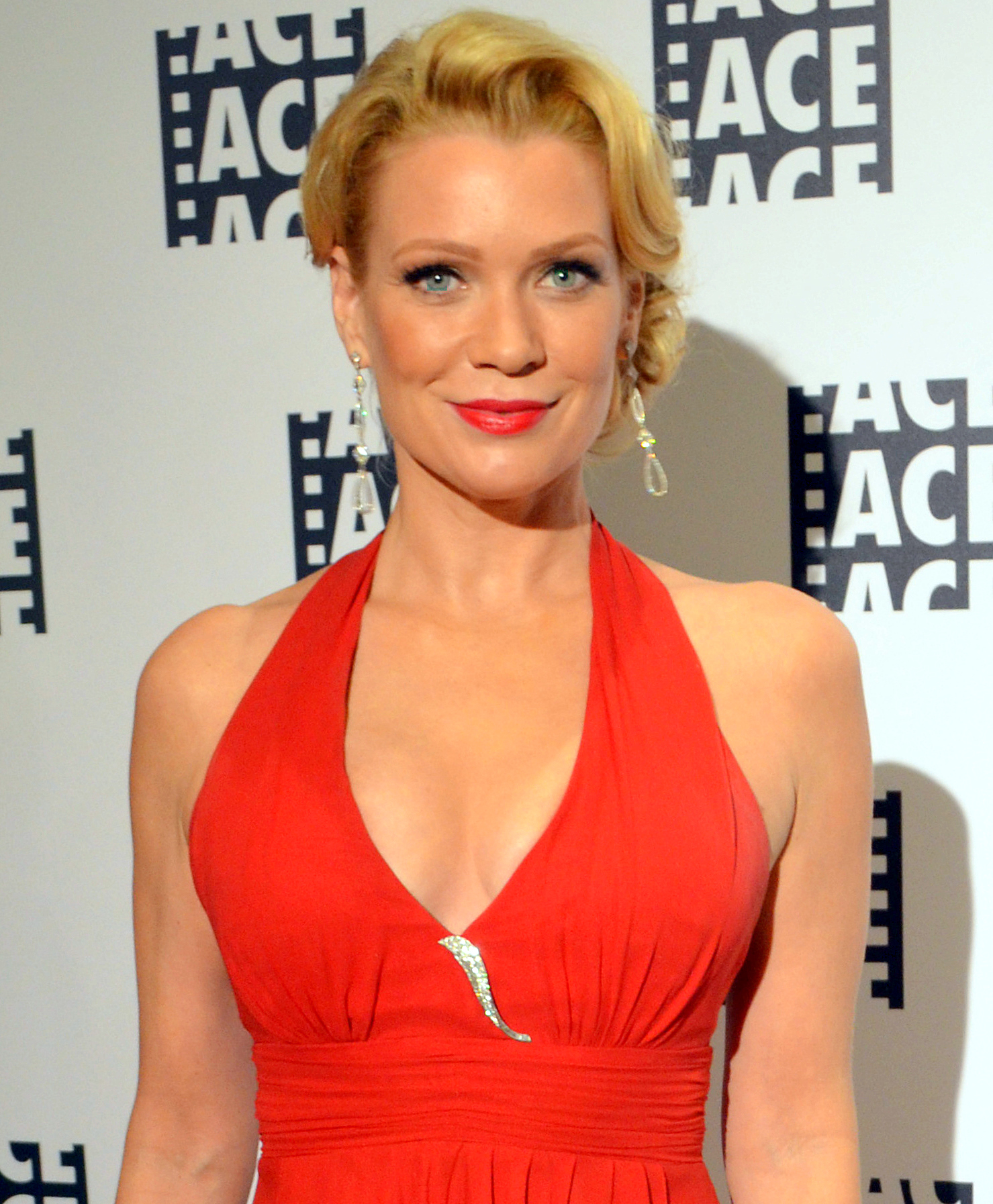
Laurie Holden's performance was well received by television critics.

"What Lies Ahead" was met with general acclaim from television critics. Gina McIntyre of the Los Angeles Times felt it was the series' best installment, calling it "thrilling" and "heart-wrenching". Similar sentiments were echoed by Josh Jackson of Paste, who gave the episode an 8.8 out of 10—a "commendable" rating. Darren Franich of Entertainment Weekly liked what he called the "casual" atmosphere of the opening scene and described the ending as "daring". IGN's Eric Goldman felt the episode got the second season off to a strong start; he gave the episode 8 out of 10—a "great" rating.

Hank Stuever of The Washington Post found the pace of this episode "sleeker" than that of previous ones, adding, "This has the subtle but immediate effect of making The Walking Dead less predictable and more frightening." Derek Boeckelmann of Daily Nexus commended the episode, deeming it "frighteningly good". He praised the performances of Holden and Reedus and described the former as one of the show's strongest characters. David Chute of Indiewire approved of the special effects and commended the highway sequence, saying, "a sequence in which the humans hide under the wrecked cars in a freeway pileup, able to see only the feet of the flesh eaters shuffling past, is a classic nail-biter." David Hickley of Daily News gave "What Lies Ahead" three out of five stars and expressed the view: "The Walking Dead may be under new management, but it seems to have kept its rhythm, moving easily between bursts of intense violence and long stretches of psychological sparring." The Hollywood Reporter writer Tim Goodman concurred. "It's 90 minutes of skill", he wrote, "bringing viewers back into the story without missing a beat, adding immediate depth to characters, ratcheting up suspense [...], plus expanding the emotional palette of the series." In his 3.5-star review, John Griffiths of Us Weekly liked the personal dynamics almost as much as the bloodthirstiness.

Some critics were less enthusiastic about the episode. Zack Handlen of The A.V. Club gave it a B+ grade; he praised the horror sequences in the episode, but called the character development "tepid". "At the very least", he wrote, "the show does a fine job working within its restrictions. There are a handful of absolutely top-notch set pieces in ['What Lies Ahead'], starting with an attack on the highway that seems to go on forever." Alex Hanno of The Tufts Daily felt that, although entertaining, the plot lacked "a much needed rush of energy". He gave it 3.5 out of 5 stars. Likewise, Nick Venable of Cinema Blend wrote: "I won't say I got bored, but much of the episode left me unmoved, and far less tense than I should have been."

=== Accolades ===
This episode won the Primetime Emmy Award for Outstanding Prosthetic Makeup for a Series, Miniseries, Movie, or Special at the 64th Primetime Creative Arts Emmy Awards in 2012. It was the second win for the series, after Greg Nicotero and his team were awarded for the series premiere, "Days Gone Bye".
