= Home (The Walking Dead) =

- The Walking Dead episode
- Rick continues to suffer hallucinations of his deceased wife Lori.
- Episode no.: Season 3 Episode 10
- Directed by: Seith Mann
- Written by: Nichole Beattie
- Cinematography by: Rohn Schmidt
- Editing by: Hunter M. Via
- Original air date: February 17, 2013

Guest appearances
- Emily Kinney as Beth Greene; Lew Temple as Axel; Dallas Roberts as Milton Mamet; Jose Pablo Cantillo as Caesar Martinez; Melissa Ponzio as Karen; Andy Glen as Mexican Boy; Travis Love as Shumpert; Karenlie Riddering as Mexican Woman; Al Vicente as Mexican Man

Episode chronology
← Previous "The Suicide King"	Next → "I Ain't a Judas"
- The Walking Dead season 3

"Home" is the tenth episode of the third season of the post-apocalyptic horror television series The Walking Dead. It was written by Nichole Beattie and directed by Seith Mann, and aired on AMC in the United States on February 17, 2013. In the episode, Rick Grimes (Andrew Lincoln) begins to see visions of his deceased wife and asks Hershel (Scott Wilson) for help. Meanwhile, The Governor (David Morrissey) plans an assault on the prison while Daryl (Norman Reedus) and Merle Dixon (Michael Rooker) fend for themselves out in the forest.

This episode marks the final appearance for Lew Temple (Axel).

== Plot ==
Rick suffers further hallucinations of his deceased wife Lori at the prison fence, while Michonne tracks him from a distance. With Rick's lack of mental stability and Daryl having left the group with his brother Merle, Glenn makes an executive decision to fortify the prison against The Governor, despite Hershel's suggestion that they flee. When Carl finds more walkers in the prison's boiler room, Glenn says that he will take Maggie to find where the walkers have breached. Glenn and Maggie, having just been rescued from Woodbury, have an emotional discussion over whether Maggie had been raped by The Governor, but she says he didn't, and tells him to go away. Hershel, after trying to warn Glenn to not put himself at risk, tries to convince Rick to take up the leadership position again, believing Glenn is not cut out for that role.

In Woodbury, The Governor thanks Andrea for restoring confidence to the residents, and believes that she would be a better leader for the community. The Governor later talks to Milton alone, assuring his loyalty that he would die for him, and to keep tabs on Andrea. Some time later, Andrea tries to find where The Governor and his right-hand man Martinez have gone, but Milton only tells her they have left Woodbury and dodges her other questions.

As Daryl and Merle make their way through the forest, Daryl wants to return to the prison but Merle insists The Governor will slaughter everyone there. They come across a Hispanic family trapped in their car by walkers, and Daryl races to help while Merle only half-heartedly contributes. With the walkers dealt with, Merle attempts to steal from the family after calling them slurs, but Daryl stops him and lets the family drive away. The two get into an argument initially about Daryl's willingness to help others, but it soon turns into longstanding issues from their childhood, and Daryl reveals that their father had beat them both. Merle finally admits that he had left Daryl as he feared he would kill their father if he stayed. Merle also reminds Daryl that they were originally planning to rob the survivor's camp outside of Atlanta.

At the prison, Carol and Axel help set up barricades, during which Axel admits he has been put in prison for trying to commit armed robbery with a water pistol. Axel begins to tell a humorous story about his brother, but is suddenly shot and killed, and Carol sees The Governor standing outside the fence. The prison group quickly take up arms while The Governor's men fire upon them. The Governor orders a bread truck filled with walkers to crash through the gates, filling the entire outer prison yard and trapping Rick who is still outside the inner fence. The Governor and his men leave the prison to its fate. Rick is nearly overcome by walkers when Daryl and Merle arrive, and safely retreat to the inner yard. While there have been no other casualties, Rick's group stares out into the yard, trapped within the prison until they can clear out the walkers.

== Reception ==
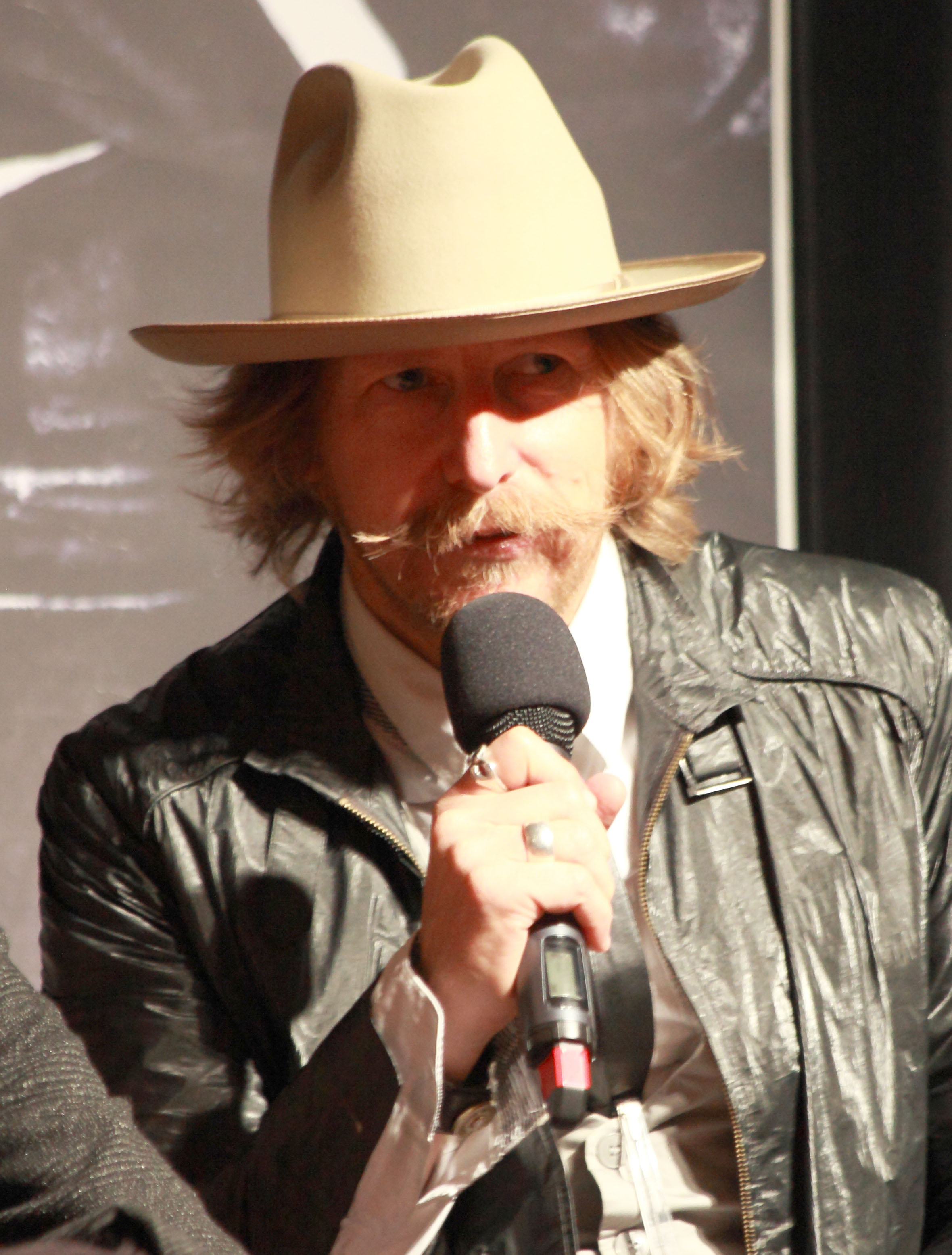
"Home" marked the last appearance of Axel (Lew Temple).

=== Critical response ===
Phil Dyess-Nugent, writing for The A.V. Club, rated the episode B− on an A to F scale, commenting the episode "catches the series at an in-between point" and that the "last several minutes are basically a video game, and a pretty good one, but it's frustrating that, after the high point of the Woodbury story arc, The Walking Dead is turning back into a show that has only two distinct modes: 3-D splatter attack and survivalist talk show. Especially when it does the splatter so much better than the talk." Eric Goldman at IGN gave the episode 8.2 out of 10, saying he enjoyed Daryl and Merle together, but disliked how fast they came back to prison, and thought the death of Axel was a huge surprise.

=== Ratings ===
The original broadcast, on February 17, 2013, was watched by an estimated 11.05 million viewers, a decrease in viewership from the previous series-high rated episode.
