= T-Dog (The Walking Dead) =

- The Walking Dead character
- T-Dog, as portrayed by IronE Singleton in the second season.
- First appearance: "Guts" (2010)
- Last appearance: "Killer Within" (2012)
- Created by: Frank Darabont
- Portrayed by: IronE Singleton

In-universe information
- Occupation: College Football Player; Church Van Driver; Supply Runner for the Atlanta Camp

Theodore "T-Dog" Douglas is a fictional character from the horror drama television series The Walking Dead, which airs on AMC in the United States and is based on the comic book series of the same name. He was created by series developer Frank Darabont and was portrayed by IronE Singleton. The character was introduced in the first season as a member of the group that series protagonist Rick Grimes encounters in Atlanta. T-Dog was portrayed as a well-intentioned and kindhearted man towards his fellow survivors, although he struggles to prove his worth in the group. The character eventually adapts to the group and becomes one of Rick's right-hand men.

T-Dog is an original character in the television series and has no counterpart in the graphic novels. Singleton made several recurring appearances as the character in the show's first through third seasons. The character was ultimately met with a mixed reception, with the criticisms of professional reviewers claiming that T-Dog lacked character development and dialogue (particularly in the show's second season), while praise was directed towards Singleton's performance, his increased dialogue in the third season, and the heroic nature of his death.

== Character biography ==
Little background is given about T-Dog prior to the walker epidemic, but in the episode "Say the Word" Glenn states that T-Dog helped a local church, driving its van and helping the elderly members of its congregation.

=== Season 1 ===
Theodore "T-Dog" Douglas is a muscular and well-intentioned man, yet somewhat clumsy. In the episode "Guts", T-Dog is one of a number of survivors who have come to Atlanta to scavenge for supplies. On the roof of the department store in which they have holed up, Merle Dixon, a virulent racist, attempts to assert his leadership over the group and beats T-Dog. Rick Grimes subdues Merle and handcuffs him to a pipe, leaving him under the watch of T-Dog while the rest of the group look for a way out. Rick and Glenn obtain a box truck, which Rick drives to one of the store's cargo doors. In the rush to escape, T-Dog accidentally drops the key to the handcuffs down a drainpipe, leaving Merle trapped on the roof. T-Dog tries to apologize to Merle but Merle insists that T-Dog did it on purpose. T-Dog does, however, in an attempt to keep walkers from killing him, padlock a heavy chain to the roof access door. The entire group (other than Merle) is able to escape the city in the box truck. In the episode "Tell It to the Frogs", T-Dog and the group return to the camp, where Merle's brother Daryl becomes enraged to hear that his brother was abandoned. Rick, Glenn, and T-Dog return to Atlanta to save Merle at Daryl's insistence, but find that Merle is gone, leaving his amputated hand behind. In the episode "Vatos", the four of them search for Merle and the bag of guns that Rick dropped, and Glenn is captured by another group of survivors, along with the bag of guns. Rick, Daryl, and T-Dog confront the other group, and after recovering Glenn they return to camp just outside of Atlanta. That evening, at dinner, the camp is overrun by a walker horde. In the episode "Wildfire", T-Dog helps the group clean up after the attack, and the group agrees to seek shelter at the CDC. In the episode "TS-19", the group reaches the CDC facility and are allowed in by the only remaining scientist, Edwin Jenner. Jenner eventually reveals that the building will soon self-destruct; when it explodes, T-Dog barely manages to escape with the others.

=== Season 2 ===
In the season premiere "What Lies Ahead", T-Dog and the remaining survivors begin travelling to Fort Benning when they encounter a blockade of abandoned vehicles, and Dale's RV breaks down. When a large herd of walkers approaches, T-Dog slices his arm on a car door, while some of the walkers chase after Sophia, who goes missing. In the episode "Bloodletting", he shows concern about being the only African-American member of the group and asks Dale to run away with him. Dale believes that T-Dog has contracted a blood infection from his wound, and Daryl later gives Dale some painkillers and doxycycline antibiotics that Merle had been carrying around. In the episode "Save the Last One", Glenn and T-Dog journey to Hershel's farm, where T-Dog receives medical treatment for blood poisoning. In the episode "Cherokee Rose", the group is allowed to stay at the farm while they search for Sophia. T-Dog helps extract a walker from one of the farm's wells, but when the walker bursts open it contaminates the water, and T-Dog kills it with an axe. In the episode "Chupacabra", when Daryl returns to camp after searching for Sophia, Andrea spots him in the distance but confuses him for a walker and shoots him. T-Dog finds Daryl wounded, and discovers that he had found Sophia's doll. In the episode "Secrets", T-Dog helps give firearm training to some of the others at the farm. In the episode "Pretty Much Dead Already", Shane Walsh breaks open Hershel's barn, where he had been sheltering walkers who had been his family, friends, and neighbors, and T-Dog helps shoot the walkers as they come out of the barn. In the episode "Nebraska", T-Dog helps burn the walker bodies. In the episode "Triggerfinger", T-Dog is seen with the group when Shane reveals that Lori is pregnant, and later when the group discusses what to do with Randall, who was captured some of the others after his group attacked them. In the episode "Judge, Jury, Executioner", T-Dog is seen attending the group debate over Randall's fate, and later witnesses Daryl mercy killing Dale after he had been ripped open by a walker. In the episode "Better Angels", Hershel allows the group to stay at his farm indefinitely following Dale's death. T-Dog helps the group move into Hershel's home, and he later notices that Randall is no longer in the barn where he was being held. In the season finale "Beside the Dying Fire", walkers overrun the farm, and he escapes with a few other survivors. He is keen on moving on and escaping, but Lori convinces him to turn back to get Rick and the others.

=== Season 3 ===
In the season premiere "Seed", after several months on the road, the group discovers a prison complex and they clear out all the walkers there so they can settle in and make it their new home. T-Dog joins some others on a scouting mission to other parts of the prison, where they encounter a group of five surviving inmates. In the episode "Sick", Rick, Daryl, and T-Dog confront the prisoners, who claim rights to the prison because they were there first. Rick and his group argue that they cleared out the walkers, so they earned the prison. They initially compromise to share the prison, but when Tomas, one of the prisoners, tries to assassinate Rick, the group fights them; one inmate (Andrew) escapes, and only two are left alive, Oscar and Axel. They surrender and Rick spares their lives but locks them in another cell block. In the episode "Killer Within", Oscar and Axel plead to be part of the group, but Rick declines. T-Dog tries to convince Rick and Daryl to let the two surviving prisoners join their group, but he is overruled. Later, a horde of walkers somehow invades the prison courtyard, and T-Dog is bitten on the shoulder by a walker while securing the gate, and is then killed while sacrificing his life to allow Carol to escape when they run out of ammunition. Later in the episode, it is revealed that the escaped Andrew let the walkers in.

== Development and reception ==
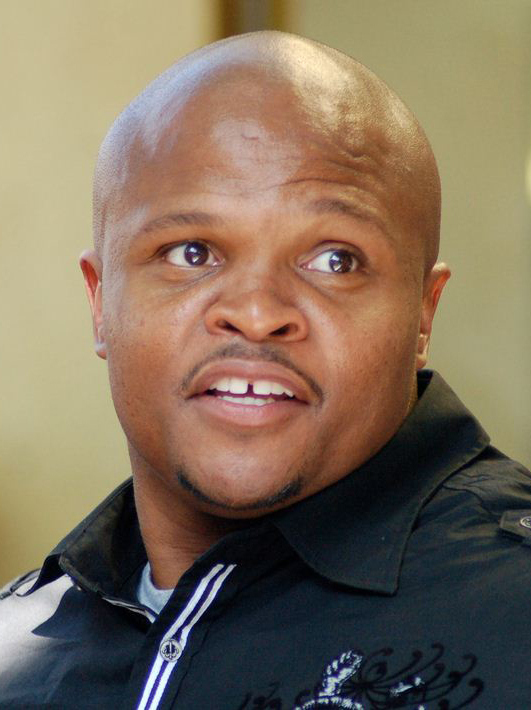
T-Dog was portrayed by recurring cast member IronE Singleton.

IronE Singleton, who played T-Dog, recalled: "when I was first cast in the show, I was told that I would do two, maybe three episodes, but I ended up staying on the show for three seasons. How miraculous is that? So, I'm very thankful for that." Singleton found it liberating as an actor to be cast in a role that was not based on a character in the comics, because "you start with a clean slate. There's nothing more liberating about starting with something that is not written. You pretty much create the history of that character and that character's life story. Whatever you do, whatever you come up with, whatever you decide on, you can go with it and, if the director or the execs they like it, then you'll stick with it." Singleton said that he did not talk with Robert Kirkman, Frank Darabont, or Glen Mazzara on how to develop his character, so "T-Dog basically had my life story. He grew up in the projects, in the city, and he was fortunate enough to get to college through a football scholarship and, eventually, academic scholarships. He majored in speech communications, the same as I did. I also majored in theater, but I did not attach that to T-Dog because it probably would've made him a little more dramatic, and we're already dramatic enough on TV. Then, he graduated from college, but didn't make it to the pros. He came close, but ended up getting a regular blue collar/white collar type of job."

Leonard Pierce of The A.V. Club commented in his review of "Guts" that IronE Singleton was "wildly overacting" and that T-Dog "isn't much more than a clown". IGN's IGN's Eric Goldman called out T-Dog as one of the new characters created for the show and did not appear in the comics that he felt were "either overdone or completely un-engaging" in the first season.

IronE Singleton reprised his role as T-Dog in the second season premiere, "What Lies Ahead", and was promoted to the recurring cast. The Hollywood Reporter writer Tim Goodman commented on T-Dog in the episode as feeling "antsy and vulnerable", a feeling which is "a key underlying element to The Walking Dead, because the group of human stragglers begins to run into ever larger packs of zombies. That feeling of being outnumbered, of struggling with futility, is ever-present." Paste's Josh Jackson felt that the side-plot of T-Dog's injury takes a backseat to the events with Rick's family at the farmhouse in "Bloodletting". Ology writer Josh Harrison commented that T-Dog finds the news that he might die of blood poisoning "morbidly funny", and Nate Rowlings of Time added that "in a moment of meta-realization, he muses on how he's the only black guy in the group—which typically means imminent death in most horror movies".

Starlee Kine of New York commented in her review of "Secrets" that with the mid-season finale as the next episode, there was "One episode to go and T-Dog has barely spoken all season". With "Pretty Much Dead Already", more reviewers began to comment on T-Dog not having a very prominent role on the show: Mark Maurer of The Star-Ledger noted that all the characters have "slim chances, even slimmer than T-Dog's role this season"; Zack Handlen of The A.V. Club quipped, "Oh hey, T-Dog is on this show! I forgot about him, much as the writers apparently did"; Time journalist Nate Rawlings said that he would "like to see T-Dog play a more active role in the next half season and perhaps learn a little bit about his past"; and Starlee Kine hoped that new writing staff on the show would bring "perhaps even a sentence or two for T-Dogg" [sic]. Nate Rawlings, in his review of "Judge, Jury, Executioner", added: "Until the writers give T-Dog something interesting to say, we're going to track how long it's been since he's had anything but a throw away line. As of last night, the count stands at 7 episodes. The last time T-Dog said anything that remotely added to the plot was Episode 4 of this season, "Cherokee Rose" when he helped pull the disgustingly bloated walker out of the well." Digital Spy's Morgan Jeffrey noted in his review of the season finale "Beside the Dying Fire" that each of the major characters "gets their moment to shine - even T-Dog (Irone Singleton), who's barely said a word for the past six weeks".

Zack Handlen commented in his review of the third season premiere "Seed" that "T-Dog has lines, folks", and in his review of the next episode "Sick" Handlen said that T-Dog "still is just 'the black guy with that name,' but at least he's getting more lines". "Killer Within" signified the final appearance of IronE Singleton as a regular. Singleton was informed about his character's fate before production of the third season began, and was informed of that the death of his character was coming just a few weeks before his final episode was filmed, so he had to avoid arousing any suspicion from the public, particularly T-Dog's fans. T-Dog's death was heroic by design and reflected his personal life; Glen Mazzara stated that T-Dog's stint as a football player became evident as "he just heroically acts as a linebacker and just clotheslines these walkers, even at his own expense." Robert Kirkman commented that he and Mazzara decided to kill T-Dog because they "really wanted to put Rick and the group back on their heels. T-Dog had become a central part of Rick's strike team, so to speak. So, to have him go out in such a heroic way also shows the audience just how important and essential he was. Now they've lost this other key piece of their group. We really wanted to be coming out of this episode completely spent and unsure as to how to move forward. Losing T-Dog definitely helps that along. Plus: We definitely wanted to lose two people in this episode. We felt that having T-Dog die would make the audience think, "Oh my gosh, this is a crazy episode. We totally lost T-Dog!" It makes the death of Lori that much more unexpected." Singleton said about his character's "heroic" death: "When I read [the script], I was thankful that he would go out as a hero. It made me feel really appreciated."

The fate of T-Dog garnered favorable reviews from television commentators. Erik Kain from Forbes magazine found Lori's death especially difficult to watch, and was shocked that T-Dog's death occurred so "suddenly" despite the fact that he "was never as prominent a figure" on the program. "As hard as these deaths were to watch," Kain wrote, "they also give me faith in the show." Even though he stated that T-Dog died "a hero's death", Michael Rapoport of the Wall Street Journal concluded that Lori's "gut-churning" demise was the more memorable. Ted Pigeon of Slant Magazine felt that the episode's "strong emotional undercurrents" were "a result of the sacrifice in both T-Dog's (IronE Singleton) final stand and Lori's decision to give birth despite the certainty that she won't survive the delivery". Time's Nate Rawlings called T-Dog's death "the most grusome [sic] human death in quite some time", after noting that "the only one willing to give the two inmates a chance was T-Dog. His character has been a frustrating part of the story. Last season, during the height of the languid days on the farm, T-Dog went entire episodes without speaking a line. He's more than proven his worth as a loyal soldier, and he's the only one who stands up to Rick and encourages him to bring the two inmates into the group.

Some reviewers presented more negative critiques. Zack Handlen of The A.V. Club in his review felt the episode "stumble[d]" in how T-Dog and Lori were eliminated and in how the Woodbury storyline repeated what was already known. Handlen commented in his review that "killing T-Dog and Lori earned the show an immediate thrill, but it also meant crossing off two potential sources of drama, people who had a history on the series, however thin or poorly developed that history might have been." According to HitFix writer Alan Sepinwall, T-Dog sacrificing his life for Carol "didn't remotely have the same resonance as Lori's for the baby, because T-Dog has never been a character the writers have even pretended they wanted us to care about. When he started objecting to Rick's plans about the two remaining prisoners, it was shocking to simply hear him expressing an opinion of any kind." The Washington Post entertainment journalist Jen Chaney commented on his death by saying, "T-Dog, we hardly knew ye. No. Really. We hardly, hardly did. And that makes your death a real shame", and Bex Schwartz said farewell in her review for Rolling Stone magazine: "So long, T-dog. You were a good guy even if they forgot to write dialogue for you for the first two seasons."
