= The Walking Dead: Destinies =

- Developer: Flux Games
- Publisher: GameMill Entertainment
- Series: The Walking Dead
- Platforms: Nintendo Switch; PlayStation 4; PlayStation 5; Windows; Xbox One; Xbox Series X/S
- Release: Nintendo Switch, PlayStation 4, PlayStation 5, Xbox One, Xbox Series X/S; November 17, 2023; Windows; December 1, 2023
- Genre: Action-adventure
- Mode: Single-player

The Walking Dead: Destinies is a 2023 action-adventure video game developed by Flux Games and published by GameMill Entertainment. It is based on the first four seasons of the TV series The Walking Dead.

The game was announced on August 17, 2023, and released on December 1, 2023. It received negative reviews from critics.

== Gameplay ==
As players progress through the main story character-specific skill trees can grant bonuses for the player.

== Premise ==
Players take control of heroes and villains during moments from the television series first four seasons, able to alter moments by playing as characters such as Rick Grimes, Michonne Hawthorne, Shane Walsh, Daryl Dixon, Carol Peletier, Glenn Rhee, and others.

== Development ==
According to Paulo Luis Santos, Game Director at developer Flux Games, the game originally covered more events from the show past the first four seasons, but the development team decided to focus on specific events from the show's most popular time period. Santos also revealed that there were over 150 different endings for the game, depending on who lived and died as a result of player decisions over the course of the main story. While Sarah Wayne Callies, IronE Singleton, Emily Kinney, Markice Moore and Madison Lintz reprise their roles from the TV series, Chandler Riggs (Carl Grimes) and Matt Lowe (Cam) provide the voices of a Woodbury Goon and Shane Walsh respectively.

Originally slated for a November 14, 2023 release, the game released digitally on November 17 for consoles and on December 1 for PC while releasing physically in December 2023.

== Reception ==
Reception

Aggregate scores
Aggregator	Score
Metacritic	29/100 (PS5)
OpenCritic	0% recommend

Review scores
Publication	Score
IGN	2/10 (PS5)
Nintendo Life	2/10 (NS)
The Jimquisition	3/10 (PS5)
Vandal	3/10 (PS5)

According to review aggregator website Metacritic, the PlayStation 5 version of The Walking Dead: Destinies received "generally unfavorable" reviews, with a score of 29/100 based on 4 reviews. The game has a 0% approval rating on OpenCritic. Ollie Reynolds of Nintendo Life said that "there's absolutely nothing here that has been executed well; it's a game that is simply rife with technical blunders, terrible production values, and broken mechanics." Wesley Yin-Poole of IGN considered it a contender for "worst game of 2023", along with Skull Island: Rise of Kong which had also been published by GameMill.
