= Theodus Crane =

American fighter and actor

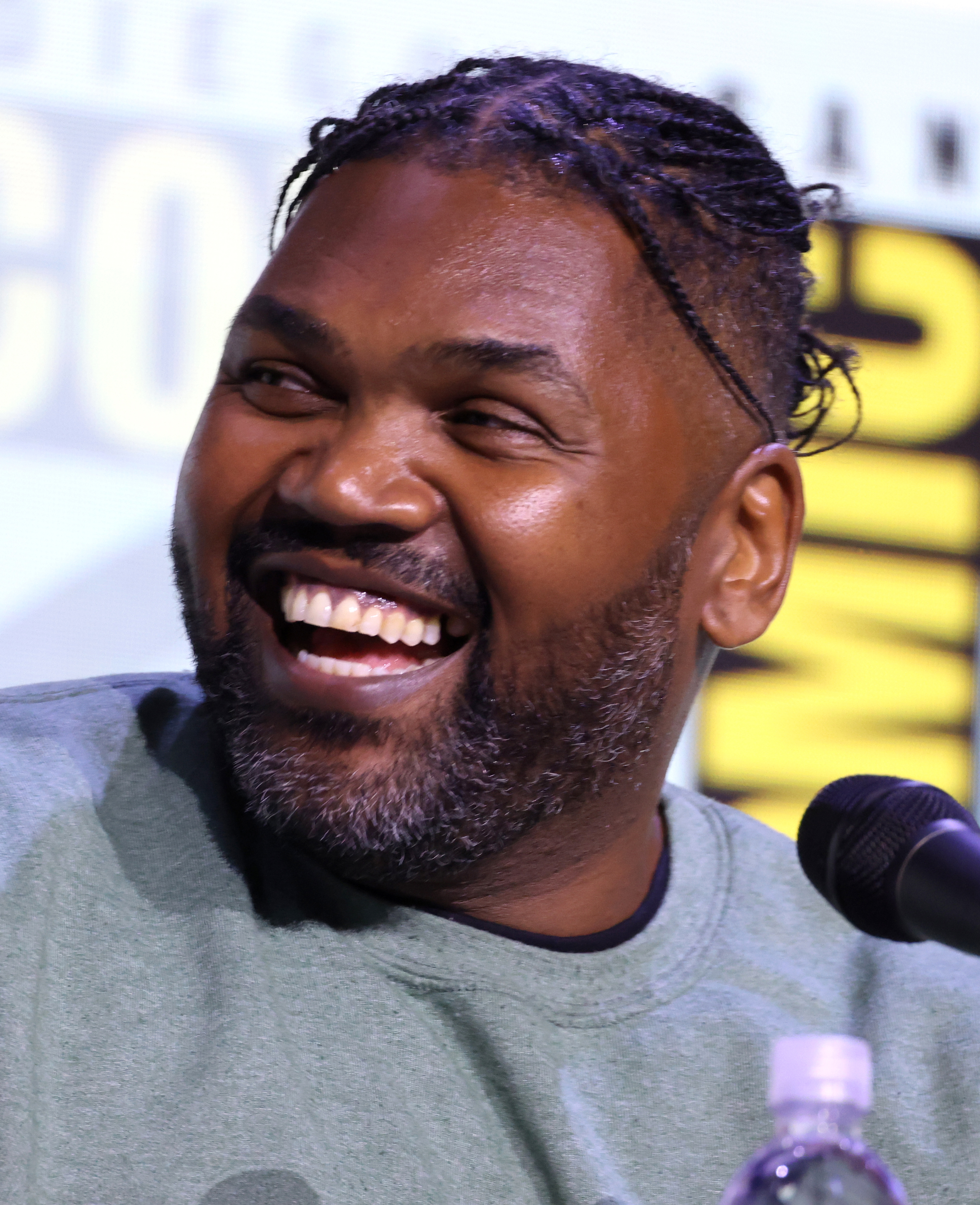
- Crane at the 2025 San Diego Comic-Con
- Born: June 18, 1979 (age 47); Atlanta, Georgia, USA
- Occupations: Actor, fighter
- Years active: 2011–present

Theodus Crane (born June 18, 1979) is an American fighter and actor, best known for his roles on The Walking Dead and Underground.

== Career ==
=== Acting ===
Crane has had a number of supporting roles in film and television. His most notable roles are Big Tiny on The Walking Dead, and Zeke on Underground.

=== Martial arts ===
Crane is trained in judo, kickboxing, boxing, Filipino martial arts and sanda. He is a two time Amateur World Champion in the World Sanda League.

== Filmography ==
=== Film ===
Year	Film	Role	Notes
2011	Dark Blue	Terrance	
2012	Rook	Sweet Leon	
2013	The Starving Games	Cleaver Williams	
2013	Christmas in Conway	Lonnie	TV movie
2014	Catch of the Day	Mavis Bayle	
2014	Barefoot	Bouncer	
2014	The Bag Man	Goose	
2014	RTTS (Random Time Traveler's Syndrome)	Davey	Short Film
2014	Serial Killer Groupie	Thurston Dixon	Short Film
2015	Street Level	Fatman	
2016	Anthrax: Blood Eagle Wings	Tormentor - The Reaper	Video Short
2016	Here Comes Rusty	Ron	
2017	Same Kind of Different as Me	Tiny	
2021	Black as Night	Bald Guy	
2021	Palmer	Parole Officer	
2023	Five Nights at Freddy's	Jeremiah	
2025	Sinners	Bouncer	
2025	Five Nights at Freddy's 2	Jeremiah	

=== Television ===
Year	TV Show	Role	Notes
2012	Breakout Kings	Jogo	Episode: "Double Down"
2012	The Walking Dead	Big Tiny	2 episodes
2014	Wild Card	Umi	Pilot
2015	Kill Em All LA	DJ	Episode: "Speak of the Devil"
2015	Less Is More	The Bouncer	TV mini-series
2016	Underground	Zeke	5 episodes
2019	Cloak & Dagger	Bo	Episode: "Vikingtown Sound"
