= Vincent M. Ward =

American actor (born 1971)

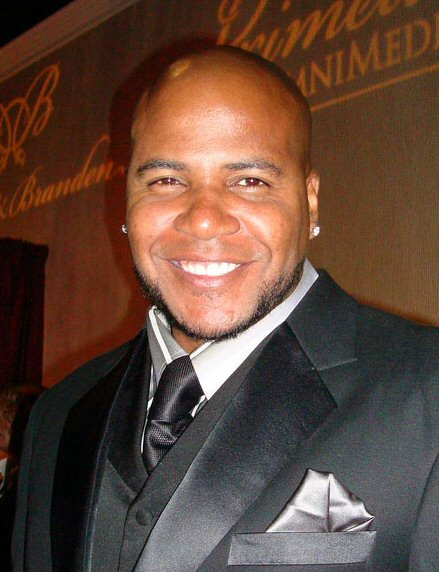
- Vincent M. Ward at the 2008 Black Enterprise Pre-Oscar Party
- Born: January 27, 1971 (age 55); Dayton, Ohio, USA
- Other name: Vincent Ward
- Occupation: Actor
- Years active: 2000–present

Vincent M. Ward (born January 27, 1971), also known as Vincent Ward, is an American actor. He is best known for his roles on The Starter Wife and The Walking Dead.

== Early life and education ==
Vincent M. Ward is a Dayton, Ohio native. Ward graduated from Trotwood-Madison High School in Ohio.

== Career ==
=== Film and television ===
Ward has had a host of small roles in film and television such as a bodyguard on Everybody Hates Chris, Hollis on True Blood, a bodyguard in Hot in Cleveland, and the mailman Darren in Wilfred.

His most notable television roles are Bo in The Starter Wife, and Oscar on The Walking Dead.

Ward's film work includes Ocean's Eleven, Live-Evil, and 2016.

=== Theater ===
Ward played the role of Kenzo in the play "Nylons" by Brandi Burks in Los Angeles in 2011. In 2015 Ward performed in The Conversation at the AMCE Theatre, Hollywood.

=== Spoken word ===
In 2012 Ward released a spoken word album Eargasms (Dont Talk Just Listen).

== Filmography ==
Film
Year	Title	Role	Notes
2000	Traffic	Man on Street	Credited as Vincent Ward
2001	Ocean's Eleven	Uzi-Carrying Guard #2	
2003	Bringing Down the House	Big Man	
2006	18 Fingers of Death!	Huge Musclebound Guy	Video; Credited as Vincent Ward
2006	Lonely in Los Angeles	Bouncer	Short; Credited as Vincent Ward
2007	All Lies on Me	Michael 'Mike V' Valascoe	Credited as Vincent Ward
2007	Cordially Invited	Jet Lewis	Credited as Vincent Ward
2007	Three Can Play That Game	Young Man #1	Credited as Vincent Ward
2008	Get Smart's Bruce and Lloyd: Out of Control	CIA Agent	Video
2008	Who Killed Bishop Brown	Bishop Ussiah Brown	Credited as Vincent Ward
2009	Robbin' in da Hood	Cedric	Video; Credited as Vincent Ward
2009	All Play No Work	Lloyd	Credited as Vincent Ward
2010	Peep Game	James Harti	Short; Credited as Vincent Ward
2010	What Profits a Man	Joana Sr.	Short, Credited as Vincent Ward
2010	Ghetto Physics	Pimp	Short; Credited as Vincent Ward
2011	Pull	Chief	Short; Credited as Vincent Ward
2011	He Who Finds a Wife 2: Thou Shall Not Covet	Wallace King	Credited as Vincent Ward
2012	Close Call	Matthew	Short; Credited as Vincent Ward
2012	The Get Away	Cleo AKA Pimp	Short
2012	The Marriage Lottery	Rufuss	Video Short
2012	A Beautiful Soul	Onyx Whitaker	Credited as Vincent Ward
2013	The Get Away	Cleo aka Pimp	
2013	Cordially Invited - the Wedding Day of Alton & Kenya	Jet Lewis	
2014	4Play	Omar	
2015	Live-Evil	Sam	
2016	Lost in the Pacific	Rodman	
2017	Illicit	Terrence	
2017	Death House	Thile	
2017	Message from a Mistress	Bishop Eric Hall	
2017	2016	Otis	
2018	Encounter	Marcus Doyle	
2018	The Choir Director	Dexter	
Television
Year	Title	Role	Notes
2003	Girlfriends	Security Guard	Episode: "The Wedding; Credited as Vincent Ward
2004	CSI: Crime Scene Investigation	Space	Episode: "Viva Las Vegas"
2005	Head Cases	Blings Right Hand Man	Episode: "Malpractice Makes Perfect"; Credited as Vincent Ward
2006–2008	Everybody Hates Chris	Guard, Cop, Bodyguard, Black Bus Driver	5 episodes
2007	CSI: Miami	Marshall Abrams	Episode: "Chain Reaction"
2008	Big Shots	Parking Officer	Episode: "Sex Be Not Proud"
2008	The Wire	Butchie's Bodyguard	Episode: "Not for Attribution"
2008	Unhitched	Guard	Episode: "Yorkshire Terrier Sucked Into the Internet"; Credited as Vincent Ward
2008	The Middleman	Police Officer	2 episodes Credited as Vincent Ward
2008	The Starter Wife	Bo	4 episodes
2008	Desperate Housewives	Guard	Episode: "A Vision's Just a Vision"
2009	Knight Rider	"Eddie"	Episode: "Knight and the City"
2009	Dollhouse	Guard #1	Episode" "A Spy in the House of Love"; Credited as 'zVincent Ward'
2009	Gary Unmarried	Agent #1	Episode: "Gary Promises Too Much"
2010	The Brown Betties Guide: How to Look for Love in All the Wrong Places	Joe	Episode: "Tip#2: Force a Relationship"; Credited as Vincent Ward
2010	True Blood	Hollis	Episode: "It Hurts Me Too"; Credited as Vincent Ward
2010	Hot in Cleveland	Bodyguard	Episode: "The Sex That Got Away"
2011	NCIS	Cop	Episode: "Kill Screen"; Credited as Vincent Ward
2012	Whitney	Ira	Episode: "Lane"; Credited as Vincent Ward
2012	House of Payne	Lil Deuce	Episode: "Scars of Payne"
2012	Body of Proof	Guard Evan Arnold	Episode: "Mind Games"; Credited as Vincent Ward
2012	Army Wives	Harris	Episode: "Tough Love:
2012	The Walking Dead	Oscar	9 episodes
2013	Wilfred	Darren	Episode: "Comfort"
2014	2 Broke Girls	Dante	Episode: "And the Model Apartment"
2014	Psych	Rocco	Episode: "Someone's Got a Woody"
2019	Black Jesus	Ransom	Episode: "Boonie Comes Up"
2026	Beef	Gavin	Episode: "It Will Stay This Way and You Will Obey"
Video games
Year	Title	Role	Notes
2026	Grand Theft Auto VI	The Local Population	
