= IronE Singleton =

American actor (born 1975)

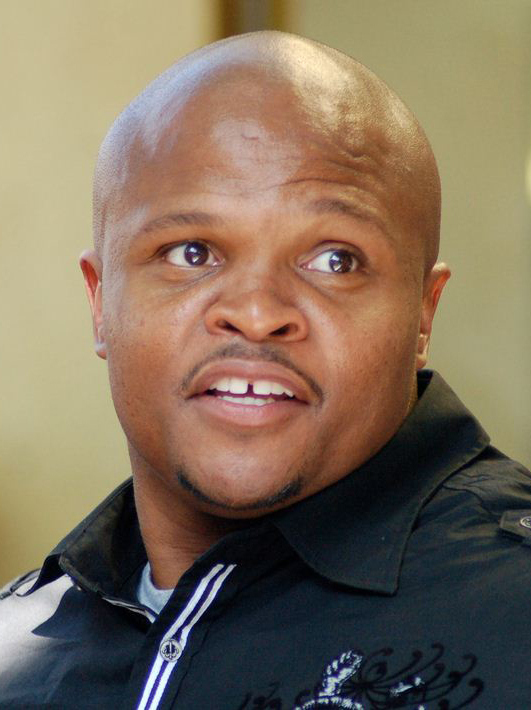
- Singleton in 2012
- Born: Robert Singleton; November 30, 1975 (age 50); Atlanta, Georgia, U.S.
- Occupation: Actor
- Years active: 1996–2014; 2020–present

Robert "IronE" Singleton (born November 30, 1975) is an American actor. He is best known for portraying Alton in The Blind Side and for starring as Theodore "T-Dog" Douglas in the AMC series The Walking Dead. Since leaving the cast of The Walking Dead he has continued to be involved in fan events and conventions as well as developing his own one-man show Blindsided by The Walking Dead.

== Early life and education ==
Singleton was born and raised in Atlanta, Georgia. He graduated from the University of Georgia, where he majored in speech communication and theatre. He played defensive back for the Georgia Bulldogs for two years until Champ Bailey, Kirby Smart, and several other highly recruited defensive backs joined the team. He then switched to running back.

== Filmography ==
=== Film ===
Year	Title	Role	Notes	Ref.
1996	Fled	Chef	Uncredited	
2000	Remember the Titans	Football Player	Uncredited	
2003	Dead Wait	Joon	Short film	
2005	The Longest Yard	Inmate with Sign	Uncredited	
2006	Somebodies	Janoah		
2007	Riff	Osiel	Short film	
2009	Life 101: Angel's Secret	Dr. Forest		
2009	The Blind Side	Alton		
2010	Lottery Ticket	Neighbor		
2011	Seeking Justice	Scar		
2013	The Box Cutter	Tim		
2020	Safety	Coach Butch Hassey		

=== Television ===
Year	Title	Role	Notes	Ref.
2008	Somebodies	Epitome	3 episodes	
2009	One Tree Hill	Homeless Man	Episode: "What Are You Willing to Lose?"	
2010	Detroit 1-8-7	Priest	Episode: "Pharmacy Double / Bullet Train"	
2010–2012	The Walking Dead	Theodore "T-Dog" Douglas	Recurring role (seasons 1–3), 23 episodes	
2011	Single Ladies	Dion	1 episode	
2011–2014	Franklin & Bash	Worker / Judge Bruce Mull	2 episodes	
2013	An Amish Murder	"Glock" Nichols	Television film	
2021	The Underground Railroad	Mack	2 episodes	

=== Video games ===
Year	Title	Voice role	Notes	Ref.
2023	The Walking Dead: Destinies	Theodore "T-Dog" Douglas		
