= Rosita Espinosa =

- The Walking Dead character
- Rosita Espinosa, as she appears in the comic book series (left) and as portrayed by Christian Serratos in the television series (right).
- First appearance: Comic: "Issue #53" (2008); Television: "Inmates" (2014)
- Last appearance: Comic: "Issue #145" (2015); Television: "Rest in Peace" (2022)
- Created by: Robert Kirkman; Charlie Adlard
- Adapted by: Scott M. Gimple; Matthew Negrete; Channing Powell (The Walking Dead)
- Portrayed by: Christian Serratos

In-universe information
- Occupation: Comic: Member of the Herd-Duty Crew; Television: Alexandria Safe Zone Medical Assistant (former); Militia Soldier (former); Coalition Soldier (former); Commonwealth Army Soldier (current)
- Family: Comic: Eugene Porter (spouse); Television: Socorro (Coco) Espinosa (daughter); Gabriel Stokes (boyfriend); Judith Grimes (adopted niece); R.J. Grimes (adopted nephew)
- Significant others: Abraham Ford (deceased ex-boyfriend); Siddiq (deceased ex-lover); Television: Spencer Monroe (deceased late lover)

Rosita Espinosa is a fictional character from the comic book series The Walking Dead and is portrayed by Christian Serratos in the American television series of the same name. She accompanies Eugene Porter and Abraham Ford on a mission to Washington, D.C. In the comic book series, she joins Rick Grimes' group after they leave the prison and go to DC. Eventually Eugene is revealed to have lied but they continue on to Washington anyway, since he was still convinced the city would offer greater chance of survival, and they eventually find the Alexandria Safe-Zone.

Rosita also takes part in the war against the Saviors led by Negan, the conclusion of which sees the 3 communities uniting forces. In the TV series, Rosita, Abraham and Eugene meet Tara Chambler and Glenn Rhee while on their way to Washington DC. They soon join Glenn's group, led by Rick Grimes, after escaping Terminus, a false safe haven. Rosita continued Abraham's mission to get Eugene to DC with Tara, Glenn, and his wife, Maggie Greene, but when Eugene reveals he lied, they rejoin Rick's group once more and travel with him to the Alexandria Safe-Zone.

In the comics, Rosita is killed by Alpha of the Whisperers. In the TV series she survives the war against the Whisperers, and she later becomes a soldier for the Commonwealth Army before she dies.

== Appearances ==
=== Comic book series ===
Rosita, Abraham and Eugene joins Rick's group at Hershel's farm after the prison is destroyed. When Eugene reveals he is a fraud it leaves her outraged, but Rosita and the others soon accept him. She remains with the group when they settle in Washington at the Alexandria Safe Zone, moving in with Abraham. While there, Abraham breaks up with her to be with Holly. At Alexandria, she becomes increasingly close to Eugene and eventually forms a sexual relationship with him but remains devastated over Abraham's death. After two years together, Rosita reveals to Eugene that she is pregnant, but he is not the father. The father of the baby is later revealed to be Siddiq, another member of Alexandria. At the community fair Alpha, leader of the Whisperers, manages to abduct and decapitate Rosita, along with Ezekiel, Louie, Erin, Ken, Luke, Carson, Tammy Rose, Josh, Olivia, Oscar, and Amber (all from Alexandria, the Hilltop, The Kingdom and The Sanctuary communities) and put their heads on spikes. This also kills Rosita's unborn child. Alpha later shows this to Rick, much to his horror. She is put down by Andrea and buried along with the others at the site.

=== Television series ===
When the outbreak occurred, Rosita was in Dallas, Texas with other survivors and was approached by Sgt. Abraham Ford and Dr. Eugene Porter in an army truck. Abraham, impressed by Rosita's survival skills, told her of his mission to get Eugene to Washington D.C. as he knows the cure to the walker virus and requested she accompany him. Along the way, they also recruited survivors Stephanie, Warren, Pam, Rex, Roger, Dirk and Josephine. Rosita and Abraham became lovers. Rosita also learned medical aid from Roger and Pam, though tragically they along with everyone except Abraham and Eugene died trying to ensure their survival. Eventually Rosita, Abraham and Eugene made it as far as Georgia near the prison, just days after The Governor's attack.

==== Season 4 ====
In the episode "Inmates", Rosita, Abraham Ford (Michael Cudlitz), and Eugene Porter (Josh McDermitt) meet survivors Tara Chambler (Alanna Masterson) and an unconscious Glenn Rhee (Steven Yeun) on the road. In the episode "Claimed", Abraham reveals to Glenn and Tara that Eugene knows what caused the zombie apocalypse, and they are on their way to Washington, D.C. to put an end to the walkers. In the episode "Us", Rosita accompanies Glenn to Terminus when they reunite with Maggie Greene (Lauren Cohan), Sasha Williams (Sonequa Martin-Green), and Bob Stookey (Lawrence Gilliard Jr.). In the season finale "A", when Rick Grimes (Andrew Lincoln), his son Carl (Chandler Riggs), Michonne (Danai Gurira), and Daryl Dixon (Norman Reedus) are locked up a shipping container by the residents of Terminus, led by Gareth (Andrew J. West), it is revealed that Rosita and the rest have all been captured and are being held there as well.

==== Season 5 ====
In the season premiere, "No Sanctuary", Rosita escapes Terminus with the group. In the episode "Self Help", Rosita and the others are en route to DC and take refuge when the bus crashes. Abraham and Rosita have sex as Eugene watches, which Rosita laughs at and tells Abraham about it. When Eugene reveals that he is not a scientist, Rosita is appalled, telling him people died to get him there. When Abraham beats Eugene unconscious, Rosita stops him from hurting Eugene further, with her hand on her sidearm, ready to lift her handgun.

In the episode "Crossed", Rosita is first seen offering Abraham water, which he knocks away. She shouts at him and he stands up, looking threatening. Maggie makes him back away from Rosita at gunpoint. Later on her, Glenn and Tara trek to a river to refill their water supplies. While filtering water, Rosita talks to them about when she first met Abraham in Dallas. Glenn and Rosita bond and he welcomes her as a part of the group wherever they wind up.

In the episode "The Distance", Rosita goes with Abraham, Michonne, and Glenn to see if they can find Aaron's (Ross Marquand) vehicles. She uses a stick to take out a walker and saves Abraham from another. When they search the RV, Abraham finds some food the group used to eat and Rosita reminiscences on the past with him, and Abraham asks if Rosita believed he would hit her after what happened with Eugene. She says no, as she knows him better. She rides the RV on both legs of the journey to Alexandria, sitting in the passenger seat with a map. When they spot Washington, D.C. in the distance she calls to Abraham and remembers their former goal and he is happy to have finally made it. She then arrives at Alexandria.

In the episode "Forget", Rosita arrives at Deanna Monroe's (Tovah Feldshuh) party with Abraham. They both appear to be uncomfortable, but she relaxes after she mentions there is beer and smiles when Abraham goes off to grab some drinks. Later, she is seen enjoying herself while chatting with Glenn and Maggie. In the episode "Try", Rosita tells Michonne that Sasha has gone missing from her post in the tower. Worried, they venture outside the walls to look for her where they discus how different it feels to be outside, now that they have a home. They find several dead walkers and realize Sasha is actively hunting them. They track her down and help her eliminate a large pack of walkers.

In the season finale "Conquer", Rosita is tending to Tara when Abraham walks in with some flowers and tries to leave when he sees Eugene asleep in a chair next to her, but Rosita convinces him to stay. As Abraham tries to quietly sit without waking Eugene, Rosita deliberately drops some pots to wake him and the two men ultimately reconcile.

==== Season 6 ====
In the season premiere, "First Time Again", Rosita tends to Tara, Glenn and Nicholas (Michael Traynor) after they are injured. In the episode "JSS", Rosita and Aaron kill some members of the Wolves that attack Alexandria. In "Now", Rosita stands guard at the gate, crying over Abraham, who has not returned home. Spencer Monroe (Austin Nichols) offers to take her place, to which she agrees, and she thanks him for stopping the truck earlier.

In "Heads Up", Rosita gives machete lessons to several Alexandrians and Eugene, who is afraid of dying. Rosita says dying is simple; what is hard is letting one's friends die out of fear. In "Start to Finish", the Alpha Wolf (Benedict Samuel) forces Rosita and Tara to surrender their weapons during the herd as he leaves with Tara's girlfriend Denise . In "No Way Out", Rosita joins the other Alexandrians killing the walkers that invaded Alexandria after Carol Peletier (Melissa McBride) kills the Alpha Wolf.

In "Knots Untie", Rosita is seen in bed with Abraham after having sex, unaware that Abraham is fantasizing about Sasha. Rosita gives Abraham a necklace. In "Not Tomorrow Yet", Abraham packs his bag and tells Rosita that he is leaving her. When a tearful Rosita demands an explanation, Abraham tells her that he thought she was "the last woman on Earth" when they got together; he then says, "Now I know you're not."

The next day out on the road, Rosita and Carol have a conversation about Morgan Jones (Lennie James) and her frustration over his views on killing. Later, she infiltrates the Saviors' compound and kills several of them with Aaron. In "Twice as Far", Spencer and Rosita have sex, and afterwards he asks her to dinner with him.

She goes on a supply run with Denise and Daryl, despite her concerns over Denise's inability to leave the walls of Alexandria. Denise is killed by a savior named Dwight (Austin Amelio), and Eugene is captured. However, a distraction causes them to fire at the Saviors, who run off. Rosita tends to Eugene as they go back to Alexandria. In "East", Rosita appears jealous and resentful of Abraham and Sasha, and goes after Daryl when he seeks vengeance against Dwight, but this leads to her capture. In the season finale "Last Day on Earth", Rosita is in the lineup as Negan (Jeffrey Dean Morgan), the Saviors' leader, arrives and begins beating an unseen member of the group.

==== Season 7 ====
In the season premiere, "The Day Will Come When You Won't Be", Negan's victim is revealed to be Abraham, and Rosita is forced to watch as Negan beats him to death with his baseball bat, "Lucille". Negan taunts her by forcing her to look at the bat, covered in her ex-lover's blood. Enraged, Daryl rushes at Negan, who subdues him and kills Glenn as punishment. Sasha later comforts Rosita after the Saviors leave, as Glenn and Abraham's remains are taken away.

In the episode "Service", Spencer tries to convince Rosita to resign herself to life under the Saviors' control, but Rosita refuses to accept it. She kills the reanimated Saviors present to get a gun and is later shown asking Eugene to make her a bullet to kill Negan. In the episode "Swear" Rosita asks Tara to give her some weapons. In "Sing Me a Song", Rosita and Eugene return to the factory Eugene and Abraham found to manufacture ammunition. Eugene attempts to talk her out of her plan, reasoning that, even if she manages to kill Negan, the saviors will retaliate by killing her and several others. Rosita angrily calls Eugene a coward who is only alive because people feel sorry for him; he produces a single bullet for her. She attempts to apologize for what she said, but Eugene does not want to hear it. They return to Alexandria to find Negan and the Saviors already there.

In the mid-season finale, "Hearts Still Beating," Rosita is still feeling vengeful, but Father Gabriel tries to persuade her to try to get revenge when the time is right, as the community will need her in the meantime. She later reconciles with Spencer, and the two agree to a date, but these plans are cut short after Negan guts and kills Spencer for trying to betray Rick and take over as leader. Enraged, Rosita draws her gun and fires at Negan, hitting "Lucille". Negan advances on Rosita, appearing ready to kill her, but changes his mind when he realizes she is not afraid of him. He then tells his minion Arat (Elizabeth Ludlow) to "kill somebody". Arat shoots Olivia (Ann Mahoney) in the face as Rosita and the others watch in horror. When Negan demands to know who made the bullet, Eugene finally confesses and Negan has his people take him away. Rosita sorrowfully protests as Negan leaves Alexandria. The episode ends with Rosita joining Rick, Michonne, Carl, and Tara to reunite with Maggie, Sasha, Enid (Katelyn Nacon), Paul "Jesus" Monroe (Tom Payne), and the newly escaped Daryl at the Hilltop, as they plan to stand against the Saviors.

In "Rock in the Road", Sasha tries to start a conversation with Rosita, but she coldly shuts her down. Rosita shows the group how to dismantle explosives. In "New Best Friends", Rosita encounters a group called the Scavengers. Rick negotiates a deal with their leader, Jadis (Pollyanna McIntosh), to help them fight the Saviors in exchange for guns. Rosita immediately decides to go out looking, clashing with Tara, who thinks they should wait.

In "Say Yes", Rosita becomes frantic in her efforts to find guns for their fight against the Saviors. When they meet with Jadis to deliver the guns they have managed to find, they are told that their offer is not enough. While Rick is able to buy them more time, Rosita, tired of excuses, goes to the Hilltop looking for Sasha. She convinces her to help her in a second attempt to kill Negan, with the condition that Sasha gets to fire the fatal shot. Having predicted this, Rosita gives her a sniper rifle from their stockpile, with both of them acknowledging that even if they succeed, they will most likely die.

In "The Other Side", Rosita rejoins Sasha at the Hilltop and they embark for the Sanctuary. Sasha tries to make small talk, asking Rosita where she acquired her skill with weapons, but Rosita rebuffs her effort. Sasha advocates a stealth approach, suggesting they take up a sniping position and stay outside the fences, but Rosita insists they go inside to ensure Negan's death. They go with Sasha's plan first, setting up in a factory adjacent to the Sanctuary. Rosita begins to open up to Sasha, revealing she was a helpless survivor before she met Abraham, but learned everything she could from him and the other people around her. She also confesses that she does not hate Sasha, so much as the love triangle they found themselves in.

When they miss their window at taking a shot at Negan, they wait until nightfall before breaching the fences. Sasha goes first, but then seals the hole with Rosita outside, intent on sacrificing her own life to defeat Negan. Rosita is surprised by this turn of events, but Sasha insists their friends need her before charging into the Sanctuary. Rosita is equally frustrated and saddened by this, before being found outside the gates by someone wielding a crossbow.

The end of "Something They Need" sees Rosita return to Alexandria with a visitor, who is revealed to be Dwight. Daryl attempts to attack him, but Rosita claims he wants to help, which Dwight confirms to Rick. In the finale, Rosita is shot after she begins firing, following Sasha's death. She is saved by Tara and recovers in bed.

==== Season 8 ====
In the season premiere, "Mercy", Rosita is seen at Alexandria, looking out her balcony, still healing from her wound, looking at the Alexandrians leaving for war. In "The King, the Widow, and Rick" Rosita is first seen by the car with Michonne, asking if she can go with her and stopping the car when they hear a woman singing. They go investigate and see Zia (Ciera L. Payton) and Leo (Sam Lewis Underwood). In the ensuing struggle, Rosita kills Leo with an RPG while Daryl and Tara gun Zia down.

In "Time for After", Rosita is seen with the group outside the Sanctuary. Daryl plans to charge his truck into the building and send the walkers into the Sanctuary; Rosita, Michonne, and Tara will cover him and distract the walkers. Morgan offers to help. Rosita is against the plan, saying it is risky, and she vouches for Rick, saying he is talking to the Scavengers to boost their numbers. Tara refuses to trust the Scavengers after they betrayed them. Rosita leaves but not before saying that waiting is sometimes the best option, something she had to learn from Sasha's sacrifice. In the mid-season finale, "How It's Gotta Be", Rosita is first seen unloading boxes from the truck. She is later seen when Negan bombs Alexandria. Rosita, along with Tara, Dwight, Daryl, Rick, Michonne, and the other Alexandrians, escapes into the sewers, only to learn that Carl has been bitten by a walker. In the mid-season premiere, "Honor", Rosita joins the others in mourning Carl after he commits suicide to avoid becoming a walker.

Rosita remains in the sewers with the other Alexandrians as the Saviors continue to destroy Alexandria above them. Rosita suggests they all flee to Hilltop. After the explosions subside and the remaining Saviors leave, Rosita and the others prepare to head to the Hilltop for refuge. In "Dead or Alive Or", Rosita assumes leadership of the group, along with Daryl. When Tara starts looking for excuses to kill Dwight, Rosita explains that they still need him to win the war against Negan and demands that she calm down. Nevertheless, Tara takes advantage of Rosita being distracted fighting against walkers in the swamp to try, unsuccessfully, to kill Dwight. Rosita reveals that she had witnessed the whole scene; when Tara asks her why she did not try to stop her, Rosita replies that, in Tara's place, she could not have been stopped. Finally, Rosita and the others arrive at Hilltop and tell the others about the events in Alexandria.

In "The Key", Rosita and Maggie stand guard at the gate. Maggie peers through binoculars and spots a mysterious crate in the distance. Rosita retrieves the crate and gives Maggie the attached note, which offers them a "key to your future" in exchange for food and records. The note includes coordinates for a meeting point. Maggie worries that they are walking into a trap, but Michonne suggests they investigate. Later, Rosita and Enid guard their mysterious benefactors - Georgie (Jayne Atkinson), Hilda (Kim Ormiston), and Midge (Misty Ormiston) - when Maggie brings them to Hilltop, but she later lets them go in the episode "Do Not Send Us Astray".

Rosita is among the Hilltop residents and refugees who are prepared to defend Hilltop from the Saviors. During the battle, Rosita and King Ezekiel (Khary Payton) shoot out the headlights on the Saviors' vehicles. She and the others manage to survive the attack as the remaining Saviors flee. She also survives the subsequent outbreak that kills several more people. In "Still Gotta Mean Something", Rosita is seen in Maggie's office with Dianne and Daryl. Dianne reports that they don't have enough ammo to fend off another attack. Presuming the Saviors are low on ammunition themselves, Daryl suggests they fight them hand to hand. Rosita points out that Eugene is probably making ammunition for the Saviors. Rosita and Daryl observe the Bullet Factory Outpost and see Eugene receiving a shipment of hundreds of bullet casings to make into new bullets. Rosita decides that instead of taking out the machines, they will take out the man, implying she intends to kill Eugene, something that Daryl agrees with, in "Worth".

Rosita and Daryl capture Eugene after killing his bodyguards and take him to the Hilltop colony. Along the way, Rosita reproaches Eugene for betraying his friends, while Eugene defends his affiliation with Negan as survival. Suddenly, a herd of walkers appears on the road, creating a distraction that Eugene uses to escape.

In the season finale, "Wrath", Rosita is seen going with the militia for the final battle against the Saviors. After Negan is defeated, Rosita goes to the Sanctuary to help the residents rebuild. Rosita asks Eugene, who rejoined Hilltop to fight Negan, if he was responsible for the exploding weapons. Eugene admits that he was, having been inspired by Gabriel's inept attempts at sabotage and some of the things Rosita said to him when she held him captive. Rosita punches Eugene in the face but otherwise appears to forgive him.

==== Season 9 ====
Six years after Rick's disappearance, Rosita has become an important member of the Alexandria community. During a scouting mission in "Who Are You Now?", she and Eugene notice a herd of what appear to be walkers talking to each other in hushed tones, which would mean they have evolved beyond the mindless killing machines they have dealt with before. The "walkers" turn out to be the Whisperers, a group that wears masks made of walker skin in order to blend in with them. While observing the Whisperers, Eugene makes clumsy romantic overtures to Rosita, who gently rebuffs him, saying that she sees him as her friend.

Eugene places an amplifier on the roof of a water tower and begins to climb down before seeing a walker herd head toward them. Rosita screams for him to climb down as his pack falls and their horses gallop away. Eugene jumps down, injuring his knee, so Rosita gives him a makeshift crutch and the two run off into the woods. Eugene insists that she leave him behind, and says that he has something to tell her; it is implied that he means to say that he loves her. Rosita tells him not to "make it weird", and hides with him in a ditch, covering themselves in mud to hide from there walkers.

In "Evolution", Rosita and Eugene find Daryl, Jesus, and Aaron, and warn them about the Whisperers, who attack the group moments later. the group manages to fight them off, but Jesus is killed. When they return to Alexandria, Rosita joins the community in paying respects at Jesus' funeral.

Meanwhile, Rosita is in a relationship with community doctor Siddiq (Avi Nash) and discovers that she is pregnant with his child. Their relationship becomes more complicated after Siddiq witnesses the murder of several community members at the hands of Whisperer leader Alpha (Samantha Morton) and develops post-traumatic stress disorder.

==== Season 10 ====
Rosita has by now given birth to Siddiq's daughter, whom they name Socorro and nickname Coco. In "Open Your Eyes", however, Siddiq is murdered by Dante (Juan Javier Cardenas), a Whisperer spy. He also attacks Rosita, but he is subdued, imprisoned, and eventually murdered by Gabriel.

Still grieving for Siddiq, Rosita is suspicious of a new arrival, Gamma (Thora Birch), and she and Gabriel imprison her while the community decides what to do with her. Whisperer second-in-command Beta (Ryan Hurst) invades Alexandria, killing dozens of people. Rosita attacks him, but he overpowers and wounds her. A remorseful Gamma saves Rosita's life by persuading Beta to retreat.

==== Season 11 ====
After contact is made with the Commonwealth, Rosita moves there and joins the army, becoming a trusted friend of General Michael Mercer. However, like the others she quickly becomes disillusioned by the corrupt system of government. After the death of Sebastian Milton, Governor Pamela Milton has everyone rounded up and sent to forced labor camps. Rosita manages to escape alongside Maggie and Gabriel and undertakes a search for her missing daughter. Although everyone else is rescued when Alexandria, which has been transformed into a Commonwealth outpost, is retaken, Rosita is unable to locate her daughter. Enraged, Rosita feeds the sadistic Warden to a zombie in revenge for his taunts.

In the series finale, as a massive zombie horde overruns the Commonwealth, Rosita manages to find and rescue Coco with the help of Eugene and Gabriel. However, while making a narrow escape, Rosita is bitten on the left shoulder, a fact that she keeps secret from the others at first. After the defeat of Milton and the horde, Rosita reveals her bite to the others and says her goodbyes before peacefully passing away in bed in Alexandria. A year later, her name is on a memorial plaque, alongside those of her friends Luke and Jules, who also died during the horde invasion.

== Casting ==
Rosita was first announced, along with Eugene and Abraham, in a casting call for Episode 10 of Season 4 in July 2013 under the code-name "Jordana Barrazza". Christian Serratos was cast as Rosita to be a recurring character in the fourth season of the show. Her real name and the actress playing her were confirmed by Hollywood Reporter on September 16, 2013.

== Reception ==
=== Critical reception ===
The character initially received mixed reviews, though most noted the increased screentime and focus of the character in the seventh season compared to the previous three. For the episode "Four Walls and a Roof", Zack Handlen for The A.V. Club noted Rosita's lack of importance saying, "Goodbye, Gareth! On the downside, you were only in a few episodes; on the up side, you had more dialogue in them than all of Rosita's lines combined."

Erik Kain for Forbes noted Rosita's decision to try and kill Negan was a highlight. He said, "...at least Rosita continues to be pretty awesome. More Rosita, please." However, for the episode "The Other Side", he was critical of her plan. Kain was also critical of Rosita saying, "If the show had really explained that Rosita was this awesome, essential part of group, I'd be more inclined to agree with Sasha's decision. As it stands, Sasha seems just as integral to the group as Rosita. It makes as little sense as Sasha agreeing to Rosita's plan in the first place, when the sniper plan is so much better. And it just plain sucks that the better character is waltzing off to certain death, while one of the show's worst characters (at least lately) is safe." Writing for "Say Yes", Matt Fowler for IGN appreciated the focus on Rosita in the seventh season. He said, "It took Abraham dying for the show to basically give her a distinguishable personality and this darker, bitter and stubborn Rosita is vastly more interesting than the old version." In contrast, Handlen felt, "Rosita's anger is getting tedious [...] her character remains frustratingly static. The writers have figured out one note to play for her, and they're leaning into it, hard. [...] The point is, she's not all that interesting to watch right now."

Ron Hogan for Den of Geek felt similar to Kain on "The Other Side". He appreciated their scenes, but questioned the idea that Sasha needed to sacrifice herself as Rosita was needed, and not her. He said, "Rosita is valuable because she knows how to hot wire cars (the group presumably has several folks like this, as they were stealing cars long before she was around), can disarm IEDs, and knows a bunch of cool knots. Does that make her more valuable than Sasha, who is the group's best sniper bar none, when Rosita had a shot at Negan from less than 10 feet away and missed him? Sasha seems to think so, as she leaves Rosita behind and storms into the Saviors compound on a suicide mission."

Some critics noted Rosita's lack of development, but felt the episode was serviceable on improving this. Writing for The A.V. Club, Zack Handlen felt that "Rosita's become something of a drag of late, as her rage and self-loathing have made her tediously one note. Her interactions with Sasha, in which she never bothers to hide her resentment over Abraham, have been the worst of it." He went further to say, "Thankfully, by the end of this episode, both women felt a little closer to actual people again. It's a simple trick—they bond over attempted murder and a list of Rosita's ex-boyfriends—but an effective one." Jeff Stone of IndieWire felt that the episode was "an excuse to give Rosita some semblance of character development, something she's been sorely lacking over her four seasons on the show. It's also mostly set-up for a cliffhanger to lead us into the final two episodes. It's serviceable on both counts."

Noel Murray of Rolling Stone ranked Rosita Espinosa 20th in a list of 30 best Walking Dead characters, saying, "Rosita's big trademark is her soldier's cap, but it's been up to TWD's writers and actress Christian Serratos to fill that hat. She's the one who's turned the character into a woman who's been strong out in the field, and one heartbroken in private that the men in her life don't stick around. Whenever she gets a big scene, the heroine becomes so much more than her headwear."
