= Jessie Anderson (The Walking Dead) =

- The Walking Dead character
- Jessie, as portrayed by Alexandra Breckenridge in the television series (left) and in the comic book series (right).
- First appearance: Comic: "Issue #72" (2010); Television: "Remember" (2015)
- Last appearance: Comic: "Issue #85" (2011); Television: "No Way Out" (2016)
- Created by: Robert Kirkman; Charlie Adlard
- Adapted by: Scott M. Gimple (The Walking Dead)
- Portrayed by: Alexandra Breckenridge

In-universe information
- Occupation: Television: Hair Stylist; Pantry Worker for the Alexandria Safe-Zone
- Spouse: Pete Anderson
- Children: Ron Anderson (son); Television: Sam Anderson (son)

Jessie Anderson is a fictional character in the comic book series The Walking Dead and was portrayed by Alexandra Breckenridge in the television series of the same name. She is a resident in the Alexandria Safe-Zone. Created by writer Robert Kirkman and artist Charlie Adlard, the character made her debut in The Walking Dead #72 in 2010.

In both media, Jessie is living in an unhappy, abusive marriage with her husband Pete and her son Ron (and Sam in the TV series) in the Alexandria Safe-Zone. She is eventually devoured by walkers, along with her youngest son Sam, when a herd swarms Alexandria.

== Appearances ==
=== Comic book series ===
Jessie appears as a resident of the Alexandria Safe-Zone community which Rick Grimes and his survivors enter. She makes her first appearance at the dinner party for the community, appearing nervous and quiet. Although her investment in the safe zone itself is limited and she refuses to speak about her marital problems, she is abruptly encountered by Rick, who faces the issue immediately. Rick confronts her in private and she admits that Pete has been physically abusive, but still stands by him. She remains protective of their son, Ron.

A series of events occurs that begins with Rick confronting Pete, which ultimately ends with Pete being executed after murdering Alexandria's leader's wife, Regina. Jessie grieves silently, but rather shortly, as she finds herself relieved that the trouble is over. She expresses gratitude towards Rick about the situation and later becomes more interested in him. She begins to make romantic advances on him, which he returns later. Rick begins to move on from his late previous wife, Lori, as his relationship with Jessie grows stronger.

During the horde that attacks Alexandria, Jessie, Rick, his son Carl, and her son, Ron cover themselves in guts to move through the horde. The plan fails and Ron is devoured by walkers, and she is later bitten. She is unable to let go of Carl's hand as the horde moves in his direction, forcing Rick to amputate her hand with a hatchet to save his son. She is later found by Sgt. Abraham Ford devoured and reanimated; Ford shoots her to avoid Rick seeing her undead.

=== Television series ===
==== Season 5 ====
In the episode "Remember", Jessie appears as a member of the Alexandria Safe-Zone who gives supplies to newcomer Rick Grimes, who recently shaved his long beard, and Jessie offers to give him a haircut. Later, when the group explores the neighborhood, Rick loses sight of Carl and Judith and runs into Jessie, who shows a panicking Rick that they are just talking to some elderly residents. In the episode "Forget", Jessie, Pete, Ron, and Sam attend Deanna's party. In "Spend", Jessie is shown when Rick visits her. She explains to him that her owl sculpture was broken, but does not know who did it. Rick promises to look into it, but Jessie questions what he will do, and he tells her that he will think of some kind of punishment. Later in the episode, Jessie's young son Sam asks Carol for a gun for protection, which raises her suspicions toward Pete's domestic treatment of his family. Carol then visits Pete and Jessie's home during the evening, asking for Jessie when Pete answers the door. In response, he replies, "Not a good time." Carol then informs Rick that Jessie is being abused and suggests that Sam may be, as well.

In the episode "Try", Jessie is in her garage when Rick shows up, informing her that he knows her family's secret. She tells him that she is a grown, married woman who can take care of herself. Jessie closes the garage door on Rick. Jessie appears to be crying about her problems, when Rick walks through her door, asking her to let him help her. She then gives him permission to help her. Pete walks through the back door drunk. He demands Rick to leave, but Jessie tells him softly to leave. "Just go", she tells both Pete and Rick. Pete punches Rick, which leads to them having a fight in their house, and then in the street after they blast through the window, brawling. In the season finale "Conquer", Jessie is among the crowd discussing the fight.

==== Season 6 ====
In the season premiere, "First Time Again", Jessie first appears in a flashback. She is first seen hugging a devastated Sam at their home when Ron walks out. Later, Jessie is in the armory when Rick walks in. Jessie admonishes Rick for his behavior with Ron in the woods. In the episode "JSS" when the Wolves attack Alexandria, Jessie hides with Sam in a closet, but goes downstairs to warn Ron away from the house, as she knows a Wolf is inside, armed with a gun. A Wolf sneaks up behind her and slams her to the floor. The Wolf goes to pick up Jessie's gun that she threw away when she was attacked. Jessie rises from the ground and picks up some scissors from her stylist set and runs towards the Wolf when her back is turned. Jessie repeatedly stabs the Wolf in the chest violently. Ron walks in and watches her as Jessie kills the Wolf. Jessie then stabs the Wolf's brain to prevent reanimation. In the episode "Now", Jessie listens to Rick's speech after he is chased by a super pack of walkers to the gates of Alexandria and now the community is surrounded by walkers. She goes home and removes the dead Wolf from her kitchen. Later, Jessie kills a zombified Betsy, who had committed suicide after her husband's death. In the episode "Heads Up", Jessie is at Rosita Espinosa's weapons-training class learning how to use a machete. In the midseason finale, "Start to Finish", Jessie helps Rick, an injured Deanna, Carl, Michonne, Gabriel, and Ron into her house after Alexandria is swarmed with walkers. She urgently pushes against the walkers that are trying to push into her house along with the others. Pushing the walkers out downstairs, there seem to be too many and they begin entering the house. They all rush upstairs and formulate a plan to escape. They cover themselves in walker blood and guts and start walking through the herd, holding hands.

In the midseason premiere, "No Way Out", Jessie is seen walking through the herd with Rick and the others. They stop and discuss an adapted plan to leave Alexandria. Jessie attempts to get Sam to go with Gabriel and Judith to the church for safety, but he refuses. Walking through the night, Sam begins to panic when he sees a young boy walker. He starts making noise and Jessie and Ron desperately try to calm him down, but the walkers find him and devour him. Jessie breaks down in tears, still holding onto Sam's hand. Carl, Ron, and Rick tell her that they must leave to avoid discovery by the walkers. She does not listen, however, leading the walkers to find and devour her. While Jessie is being eaten alive, Carl attempts to escape, but is unable due to her tight grip on his hand. Rick chops off her hand with his hatchet to save Carl from being pulled in after her.

== Casting ==
Breckenridge explained: "I didn't know anything. I hadn't watched the show before. I'd watched the pilot a long time ago, which I enjoyed, but I wasn't into the blood and guts at the time, so I didn't continue watching for that reason. When I got the part, I watched all four seasons in a week and was having zombie nightmares. It was like cramming for an exam. I hadn't read the comics and when I first had my meeting with Scott Gimple, he suggested I not read the comics because the show and characters aren't always exact to the comics. If you've seen the comics, my character has short black hair with bangs and wears a headband — and she's a meek; she's a weaker character than I'm playing on the show, which is great because I enjoy playing a stronger character."
