= Aaron (The Walking Dead) =

- The Walking Dead character
- Aaron, as he appears in the comic book series (left) and as portrayed by Ross Marquand in the television series (right)
- First appearance: Comic: "Issue #67" (2009); Television: "Them" (2015)
- Last appearance: Comic: "Issue #193" (2019); Television: "Rest in Peace" (2022)
- Created by: Robert Kirkman; Charlie Adlard
- Adapted by: Scott M. Gimple (The Walking Dead)
- Portrayed by: Ross Marquand

In-universe information
- Occupation: Recruiter for the Alexandria Safe-Zone; Comic: Member of the Herd-Duty Crew; Farmer; Television: Politician; NGO Worker; Member of the Militia; Alexandria Council Member
- Significant others: Eric Raleigh; Paul "Jesus" Monroe
- Children: Television: Gracie (adopted daughter)

Aaron is a fictional character from the comic book series The Walking Dead and television series of the same name. He is portrayed by Ross Marquand in the television series.

In both media, he acts as a recruiter for the Alexandria Safe-Zone located in Washington, D.C., for Rick Grimes and his fellow survivors on the road. Although initially mistrusted by Rick's group, he gradually gains their trust and becomes a respected and resourceful ally to the group. Aaron is the longest surviving Alexandria character and is notable for being the comic book's first openly gay character.

== Appearances ==
=== Comic book series ===
Aaron is introduced as a recruiter for the Alexandria Safe-Zone, a community built from a quarantine zone for politicians during the outbreak. Aaron comes into contact with Rick's group shortly after they exterminated the Hunters and had been observing them with his fellow recruiter and boyfriend Eric to determine if they were suitable for the community. Although the survivors are initially suspicious of Aaron's motives, they go along with him to Washington, D.C., and eventually join Alexandria. The leader of Alexandria, Douglas Monroe, is hesitant about the prospect of the group staying, but Aaron defends them, believing they are genuinely good people. He remains fiercely loyal to Rick and company for the remainder of the series.

After the group's arrival, Eric is stabbed by a random woman they were trying to recruit. Eric is taken back to Alexandria by Aaron and is quickly healed by the town's surgeon, Denise Cloyd. In the wake of this event, the couple mutually decides to stop recruiting and focus on maintaining things within the safety of their walls. A zombie attack puts the community in disarray and culminates in Rick becoming leader in the wake of Douglas' death. Aaron and Eric are both assigned inventory together and keep track of the community's rations and supplies to ensure that it continues to run properly. The two also participate in training with Rick and the rest of the group in order to defend themselves better against the undead. Aaron and Eric begin to grow more comfortable venturing outside the walls again, assisting others in supply runs.

A recruiter named Paul "Jesus" Monroe finds Alexandria and offers an alliance with the nearby community of the Hilltop Colony. Aaron convinces Rick to trust Jesus and not make an enemy out of him, reminding Rick of how he didn't initially trust Aaron when he came to rescue the group. The alliance leads to joining Hilltop's conflict with an extortionist group called the Saviors, led by Negan. The conflict begins with the death of Abraham. Aaron and Eric are both shaken, with the two of them attending his memorial service. They later participate in the war against the Saviors and form the Militia, an army consisting of many members from Alexandria, Hilltop Colony, and another community called The Kingdom. Eric is killed in battle, leaving Aaron devastated. His grief quickly turns into fury and he vows to kill every remaining Savior in order to avenge Eric's death. The Militia wins the war and Negan is sentenced to life in prison.

Two years later, Aaron has moved on from Eric's death but struggles with the idea of finding new love. He continues to be a productive member of Alexandria by leading zombie herds away from the communities. Aaron considers starting a relationship with Jesus, but he is unsure due to his continued grief over Eric and Jesus' casual relationship with Hilltop nurse, Alex. Aaron is later attacked by the Whisperers, a cult of primitivists that wear the faces of the dead, and is stabbed by Beta. He is taken to Hilltop to recover. During his stay at Hilltop, he gets closer to Jesus and the two begin a relationship. As the Whisperers burn down Hilltop, Aaron manages to rescue Rick's son Carl, despite his injuries. Aaron and Jesus return to Alexandria and aid them against the Whisperer's undead army. Andrea is bitten in the attack and Aaron and Jesus give their condolences before she dies. When on the road returning to Hilltop, Aaron and Jesus are ambushed by Beta and his last few remaining Whisperer followers. In the ensuing fight, Aaron shoots Beta, killing him and officially ending the Whisperers.

The communities make contact with a civilization in Ohio called The Commonwealth. While they initially help in the rebuilding of the communities, they occupy the Coalition and enforce their capitalistic rule. A class war breaks out within The Commonwealth. Aaron and Jesus join the civilians against the Commonwealth Army. Rick manages to deescalate the riot and calls for peace, but is later shot and killed by the Governor's son, Sebastian Milton. Aaron and Jesus grieve Rick along with the others that knew him. Twenty-five years later, Aaron and Jesus continue to be in a relationship and live on a riverside farm where an adult Carl, his wife Sophia, and their daughter, Andrea, visit frequently.

=== Television series ===
Prior to the events of the series Aaron became a recruiter for the Alexandria Safe-Zone, along with his boyfriend Eric. At some point Aaron recruited a group of three led by Davidson, who Aaron believed would be a good addition to the community. However, Davidson's violent nature led to Deanna exiling him. Aaron, Aiden and Nicholas were forced to escort Davidson's group out, taking all their weapons and leaving them only a few days worth of supplies.

==== Season 5 ====
In the episode "Them", Aaron (Ross Marquand) introduces himself, first, to Maggie Greene (Lauren Cohan) and Sasha Williams (Sonequa Martin-Green), stating his name and that he wishes to speak to the leader, which he already knows is Rick. Then he notes that he has good news for the group. In the next episode, "The Distance", Sasha and Maggie take him as a prisoner and bring him to Rick. Aaron tells them that he has been following them for quite some time and wants to invite them to live in a safe community nearby. Rick does not believe him and orders everyone to check if the things he said are true. They come to the conclusion that Aaron is telling the truth and decide to go along with him to the community. Rick, Glenn (Steven Yeun), Michonne (Danai Gurira) and Aaron are attacked by walkers, but they manage to reunite with the rest of the group and Aaron's partner, Eric (Jordan Woods-Robinson). Together they enter the community, which lies in Alexandria, Virginia. In the episode, "Remember", Aaron leads the group in Alexandria while carrying Eric inside. After letting Eric go off to the infirmary, he stays at the gate with Nicholas (Michael Traynor) as the group enters. Aaron asks that group comply with Nicholas' orders to turn over their weapons, and that they will need to speak to the leader, Deanna Monroe (Tovah Feldshuh). After she spoke with Rick, Aaron guided Rick and Carl to the two vacant houses in the Safe-Zone, and that he and Eric will be four houses down if Rick or anyone else needs anything.

In the episode "Forget", Aaron follows Daryl Dixon (Norman Reedus) out of the safe-zone, under the guise of hunting rabbits. Aaron then joins Daryl on the hunt, during which they find Buttons, a wild horse they have been trying to wrangle for months. When Daryl attempts to get Buttons, they are attacked by walkers and flee the area. The two bond over being seen as outsiders—Daryl because of his survivalist background, Aaron because he is gay. Soon after, Aaron is attacked and Daryl rescues him. They come to find Buttons being devoured by walkers, so both Aaron and Daryl kill the walkers, with Aaron shooting Buttons to put him out of his misery. Aaron goes back to the safe-zone but did not attend the party so that he could help mend Eric's broken ankle. When Daryl arrives to the Monroe house but declines to go inside, Aaron invites Daryl over for spaghetti. Aaron and Eric then surprise Daryl with a motorcycle they built themselves, and reveal that Eric is retiring as a recruiter and Daryl is to take his place. Daryl is grateful and forms a friendship with Aaron and Eric.

In the episode "Spend", Daryl and Aaron head out to find other recruits for Alexandria. In the episode "Try", Daryl spots a light some miles away, but when he and Aaron investigate, they find a group of mutilated walkers and their human victim; the latter has a "w" carved into her forehead.

In the season finale "Conquer", Daryl and Aaron find evidence of other people moving around the forest and begin to track them. Aaron tells Daryl about a group of survivors he recruited led by a man named Davidson who were ultimately exiled from Alexandria, and he personally had to escort them out without their weapons. They then see a lone survivor wearing a red poncho in the middle of a field and follow him. They lose track of the survivor and decide to scavenge supplies from some abandoned food trucks. However, they set off a trap that unleashes a horde of walkers on them and they are forced to take shelter inside a car. Daryl offers to risk his own life to help Aaron escape, but Aaron is adamant that they both escape together. At that moment, Morgan Jones (Lennie James) arrives and, with his help, Daryl and Aaron are able to escape. Aaron offers to bring Morgan to Alexandria, but Morgan politely refuses, saying that he needs to get to Washington, D.C., and shows them the map he picked up in the church, which Daryl recognizes. Daryl, Aaron, and Morgan arrive back at Alexandria in time to witness Rick executing Pete Anderson (Cory Brill), a traitorous community member who had murdered Deanna's husband Reg (Steve Coulter). Meanwhile, the Wolves find Aaron's backpack, containing evidence of Alexandria's existence.

==== Season 6 ====
During the finale of season 6, "Last Day on Earth", Aaron and several others volunteer to help Rick get medical attention for Maggie, who is experiencing complications with her pregnancy. En route to Hilltop, the group discover all the roads are being blocked by a hostile group calling themselves the Saviors. The group realize they are being lured into a trap, and Aaron points out that one of the many walkers left by the Saviors as a diversion on a road had strands of Michonne's hair stuck to it. At one point, while the Saviors are taunting the group, a man they caught is being hung over a bridge with a chain tightly wrapped around his neck. Aaron wants to help him, but Rick tells him they need to save their bullets, and leave the man to die. Eventually, Eugene Porter (Josh McDermitt) devises a plan to take the RV alone at night to lure the Saviors away from the others. However, while taking Maggie through the woods on a stretcher, the group are captured and disarmed by dozens of Saviors. They are then reunited with Daryl, Glenn, Michonne and Rosita Espinosa (Christian Serratos), who are already held captive. After the group is lined-up on their knees, the Saviors' leader, Negan (Jeffrey Dean Morgan), introduces himself, and after telling them his plans for the group, he selects one of them to be beaten to death with a baseball bat wrapped in barbwire he calls "Lucille" as a punishment for killing his people. Negan chooses who is to die by playing "Eeny, meeny, miny, moe", and the beating is shown from the point-of-view of whoever Negan says is "it".

==== Season 7 ====
In the season premiere "The Day Will Come When You Won't Be", the murdered person is revealed to be Abraham Ford (Michael Cudlitz). Negan kills Glenn as well after an enraged Daryl attacks him. Aaron is forced to witness all of this. In the episode "Service", while the Saviors sack Alexandria, Aaron and Eric watch the commotion from their front porch while the Saviors steal a mattress out of their house. Eric tries to confront Rick concerning what he plans to do about Negan, but Aaron tries unsuccessfully to stop him, telling him that it is not the right time to start that discussion. In "Go Getters," Aaron is at Rick's house preparing for a race to collect supplies for his weekly offering to the Saviors, and goes to the stairs to let Rick have a private moment with Michonne before leaving to race. In the episode "Sing Me a Song," Aaron and Rick leave a box truck and stop there to rest for the night. Aaron and Rick approach a door with a sign that reads, "Go on, the only thing here is that you have problems." Under pressure to find supplies for the Saviors, they jump the door, and find another warning sign; this time, the writer threatens to shoot anyone who comes for their food, supplies or ammunition. Undaunted, they move beyond the signal and find a pond full of walkers. They see a dilapidated houseboat floating in the center of the pond. In the final mid-season episode, "Hearts Still Beating," Aaron and Rick risk their lives to get the supplies. However, the Saviors angrily beat Aaron up anyway when they return to the Alexandria Safe-Zone after Negan takes offense to a vulgar note he left him.

==== Season 8 ====
In season 8, Aaron joins the Militia to fight the Saviors alongside Eric. During a battle in "The Damned", Eric is shot and mortally wounded. In "Monsters", Eric urges Aaron to leave him and rejoin the fight. When Aaron returns, he is devastated to discover that Eric has died and reanimated as a walker. He watches in agony as Eric staggers mindlessly away with a nearby herd of walkers.

In "Something They Need," Aaron joins the others in going to the Oceanside community to take their weapons, but Oceanside gets the better of them and takes several of the hostage, including Aaron. For the rest of the season, Aaron stays in the Oceanside area alone, attempting to convince the women to help. As a result, he becomes emaciated and weak. After killing a group of walkers and passing out, Aaron makes a speech to the women that rallies them to the Militia's aid. In the season finale, Aaron returns to the Hilltop with the women of Oceanside in time to ambush a group of attacking Saviors, killing them all with firebombs. After the war, Aaron adopts the baby Gracie, whose Savior father died in the same battle in which Eric was killed.

==== Season 9 ====
Eighteen months after the end of the war, the communities live in peace, albeit a fragile one due to tensions between the Saviors and the other communities. Aaron is part of the crew working on a bridge. When a herd of walkers approaches the workers' camp, Aaron's left arm is crushed under a pile of logs. Daryl frees him, but community doctor Enid (Katelyn Nacon) is forced to amputate his arm. Rick apologizes to Aaron as he recuperates, but Aaron reassures him, saying that thanks to him, "It's not the end of the world anymore... It's the start of a whole new one."

Six years after Rick's disappearance, Aaron, his missing arm replaced by a metal prosthetic, has become a member of the council of the Alexandria Safe-Zone. When Rick's daughter Judith (Cailey Fleming) saves a group of people led by a woman named Magna (Nadia Hilker), Aaron leads her group back to Alexandria.

Aaron is a key participant in Alexandria's war with the Whisperers. He is present when the hostile group kills Jesus, and joins the Hilltop, Kingdom, and Alexandria communities in mourning him. After the Whisperers' leader, Alpha (Samantha Morton), murders several members of all three communities as punishment for her daughter Lydia's (Cassady McClincy) defection, Aaron accompanies Michonne and the remaining Alexandrians to help the Kingdom residents travel safely and move to the Hilltop.

==== Season 10 ====
Months later, Aaron forms a militia to battle the Whisperers and destroy walkers. Aaron radios Gabriel at Alexandria to warn him about the recently discovered Whisperer mask at the beach, suggesting they go on lockdown. He and Michonne go the hunt for walkers, and he spots a few on a bridge and rushes in to kill them. Michonne saves him and angrily reminds him not to cross into Alpha's border. However, Aaron reminds her about the people they have lost and declares that he is "goddamn sick of being nice".

Aaron and the others decide to cross Alpha's border to put out a fire caused by a crashed satellite in order to keep it from spreading to Oceanside. They discover the remains of the satellite and start combating the fire. The group runs out of water as a herd of walkers approaches the group. Aaron and the other start fighting off the herd. Later, the fire is put out and everyone recovers. Over the next two days, they fight wave after wave of walkers pouting in through the community's gates. After they destroy all of the walkers, Aaron helps clean up the mess.

During a community meeting, Michonne tasks Aaron with leading a team to destroy another wave of walkers coming from the south. Under protest, Aaron takes Negan, whom he blames for Eric's death, as a member of the team. The two are immediately at odds, with Aaron demanding to know why Eric had to die, and Negan justifying his past actions as necessary to protect his people. When Negan says that Eric died because of Aaron's failure to protect him, an enraged Aaron replies that, by that logic, Negan is responsible for the death of his beloved wife Lucille, and that she must have died hating him. At that moment, a walker surprises them and attacks Aaron; he kills it, but gets blood in his eyes, leaving him blind and helpless as a herd closes in. Negan saves his life, however, and washes the blood from his eyes, restoring his vision.

Despite owing Negan his life and eyesight, however, Aaron tells the council that he is too dangerous to be kept alive. When Negan escapes their captivity, Aaron leads the search party for him, during which he encounters a mysterious woman named Gamma (Thora Birch), whose skill with killing walkers leads him to believe she would be a useful addition to the Alexandria community. He persuades her to come back with him. She turns out to be Alpha's sister and right hand, however, and tries to kill him. He is saved by Lydia and Carol Peletier (Melissa McBride).

Aaron meets Gamma at the border on the bridge again and she asks if her infant nephew, who was left to die outside Hilltop, is still alive. Aaron says he was rescued by a family and is named Adam. She offers him information in exchange for seeing the boy. Before accepting any type of deal, Aaron makes her take off her mask and to tell the truth. Gamma says her real name is Mary, and reveals to him the location of Alpha's horde.

Upon arriving back at Alexandria, Aaron is informed about Siddiq's (Avi Nash) death at the hands of the spy Dante (Juan Javier Cardenas), whom Aaron had recruited. When Carol tells him not to blame himself, he reveals that he has been talking with a Whisperer and she has told him the location of Alpha's horde, explaining she just wants to see her nephew Adam. Daryl tells Aaron to summon a group from Hilltop to help them with the mission. He attends Siddiq's funeral, and then goes home to watch Gracie, telling her the story of how he and Eric first met. The following day, Aaron and the others go after Alpha and her horde, but she leads them into a cave and traps them with the horde. They navigate the cave and find a cord of dynamite, with which they try to destroy the herd. The explosion causes the cave to begin collapsing, trapping Magna and her friend Connie (Lauren Ridloff) inside.

Aaron returns to Alexandria to find that the Whisperers have attacked and killed several residents. They regroup at Hilltop, but are followed by the Whisperers' new leader, Beta (Ryan Hurst), and the horde of walkers. During resulting battle, Hilltop is nearly destroyed, but Aaron manages to escape with a wounded Luke (Dan Fogler). In the nearby woods, Aaron encounters Negan, who tries to convince him that he is not a threat, but Aaron is too angry to hear Negan out. The confrontation is interrupted by the approach of a small herd, forcing Aaron to fight them off to protect the still-unconscious Luke while Negan escapes.

At Oceanside, Aaron and Alden act as lookouts, and radio what they see to Gabriel. They manage to fight off the Whisperers, who are then further assisted Maggie, who had returned to help. Aaron, along with Alden, Maggie, and her escort, arrive at the Tower just in time to kill the invading Whisperers and save Gabriel's life. At the end of the war, after helping to defeat Beta and the horde, Aaron takes Gracie to reintroduce Maggie to her.

== Casting ==
Robert Kirkman briefly alluded during the Talking Dead episode for The Walking Dead episode "Coda" in November 2014 that the second half of the season would introduce a prominent gay character. Before Ross Marquand received the role of Aaron, he auditioned for the role of Gareth. Due to his comedic roots, the casting director thought Marquand was better suited to play Aaron, who has a more humorous personality, and so he returned to audition for the role. The casting call for Aaron used the codename Logan.

== Development and reception ==
Aaron first appeared in the season five episode "Them", and some critics compared his introduction to that of an Other from the ABC television series, Lost. Laura Prudom for Variety commented on his appearance at the end of the episode, as "a stranger called Aaron (Ross Marquand), the 'friend' who delivered their suspicious water supply, who may hold the key to their continued survival. But will the group be able to trust him—and is he worthy of their trust?" Ron Hogan for Den of Geek commented that Aaron "pops up at the end of the episode looking entirely too clean and well-fed". Matt Fowler of IGN noted that Aaron appears "in the final scene—a character comic fans will know well—off to lead our survivors into their next major arc." Ted Berg for USA Today commented that "At the end of the episode, we meet a new dude, Aaron. Aaron's super preppy and way too clean for this world, so we can guess he's doing something evil even if the internet says that's not how it played out in the original graphic novel series."

Although Aaron and Eric are boyfriends in the comic series, many viewers were still surprised due to the same-sex kiss the two shared in the episode "The Distance". In reviewing the episode "Remember", Troy L. Smith commented that "Both Aaron and Eric play significant roles in the comic book. But their biggest contribution is their connection. The bond between the two should provide a sentimental element the show has been lacking a bit."

Matt Fowler of IGN reviewed "Forget" and commented that "Aaron, despite his short time on the series, has already leapt out as a really engaging character. More so than a lot of other characters were able to do in the past when they were newly introduced. [...] You can easily see now why Aaron makes a great recruiter. He has a way of talking to people, as an "outsider" within his own community, that truly reaches them. And it was that outlying status that helped him get through to Daryl. Well, that and their time out with Buttons." Sean McKenna for TV Fanatic comments on Daryl saying "it was great to watch him and Aaron bond (after some angry hesitancy from Daryl) to the point where they had each other's backs, and Daryl was even willing to stop in for some spaghetti." Shane Ryan for Paste Magazine also commented on Daryl, "makes the biggest strides this episode, thanks to the kindness of Aaron, who shows some belief in the crossbow-wielding outdoorsman" and that Daryl "just needed somebody to believe in him, and to give him a purpose. Aaron did just that, and now he’s back in the fold". Patrick Kevan Day for the Los Angeles Times commented that Aaron and Eric "genuinely seem to be as pleasant as they seemed at first. Barring any horrific twists, it seems these two are as genuine as they come".

Matt Fowler of IGN reviewed the episode "Spend" and commented that "I don't even think Aaron feels like an 'outsider' in Alexandria because he's gay. I think it's because he's a capable, caring person who will fight by your side. Unlike so many others." Zach Handlen of The A.V. Club in a review of the episode "Try" commented of the Alexandrians that "these people are absolute shit at going on runs outside the fence, unless it's Aaron on a recruiting trip". Chris Oshea for Us Weekly in a review of the fifth season finale "Conquer" commented that "Aaron and Daryl are likely going to start off next season with matching friendship bracelets."

Ron Hogan from Den of Geek! in his review of the sixth season episode "Now" appreciated the scene in the sewer tunnel with Maggie and Aaron after revealing her pregnancy: "It was wonderful work from Cohan, and while it just confirms what everyone's expected all along about just why Maggie has been staying home all season, it's still really well done because Aaron is a great character and we're all invested in Glenn and Maggie’s relationship."

Eric is killed in the season eight episode "Monsters"; in the TV series he died from a gunshot wound, but in the comics he was killed instantly by a shot to the head. Cameron Bonomolo for comicbook.com commented that "Eric succumbing to his wounds, alone, is arguably a hell of a lot worse than taking a bullet to the head: at least comic book Eric didn't see it coming. Comic book Eric also didn't have to reanimate, and it may be hard for Aaron to get closure knowing his beloved is out wandering around as just yet another Walker in a herd of corpses. Though the specifics of their fates differed, both Erics died as result of a battle with Saviors—and we just may yet see a vengeful Aaron on the horizon." Eric Kain of Forbes criticized the acting in the sequence where Aaron finds Eric, saying "The bad fake crying scene between Aaron and Eric could have been fixed so easily, so I'm a little confused why it ended up so unbelievable."

In the ninth season episode "Who Are You Now?", Aaron was revealed to be a member of the council of Alexandria, with Erik Kain of Forbes describing him as "sporting his cool beard and a metal arm". After the death of his character in "Evolution", the actor who portrayed Paul "Jesus" Monroe commented on how Jesus and Aaron did not get into a romantic relationship, saying "I think it's unfair to the audience, to tease that Aaron and Jesus relationship. But it's also great that we have it in there. I’m happy they did that. [...] I liked that they had a friendship, but I felt like a further relationship wasn’t necessarily required. I thought it would have been a bit lazy". In a review of the next episode "Adaptation", Kirsten Acuna for Insider said that "we see that Aaron is among those characters who's deeply affected by his friend's death, apologizing to Michonne on the mid-season premiere for not listening to her when it came to leaving their own community."

In the tenth season episode "Walk with Us", Aaron has an encounter with Negan who has joined the Whisperers as part of a plan to stop them. Noetta Harjo of Geek Girl Authority reviewed the episode, writing "Aaron is dragging an injured Luke (Dan Fogler) on a makeshift stretcher. When he sees Negan walk by in his Whisperer mask, Aaron grabs his sword. Negan tries to say it's not what Aaron thinks, but Aaron thinks he wants to kill Negan." Erik Kain for Forbes said that "Negan tries to protest, but the only thing that prevents a fight is a handful of walkers showing up. Maybe Aaron will finally trust Negan when he learns the truth—or maybe he'll just trust him for one more episode before flipping again."

Robert Balkovich for Looper commented in his review for the episode "One More" that "Both Gabriel and Aaron struggle with their relationship to their family—the community of Alexandria—throughout this episode. Gabriel's faith in the possibility of maintaining a safe home for them wavers, while Aaron occasionally loses sight of what it takes to keep their family alive and well. But in surviving their ordeal with Mays, it appears that each man gains a bit more resolve to refocus and keep pushing forward." Writing for TV Fanatic, Paul Daily said that "The character development for them both is excellent, but Aaron is too much of an optimist, and I hope the altercation with Maes will veer him away from trusting people blindly." Marquand explained of Aaron in an interview about this episode that "I think it's certainly redeemable, but I think it's going to give Aaron pause, and it's going to make him really question the kind of man Gabriel is moving forward [...] I don't think there's any way Aaron couldn't be wildly affected by that and not look at Gabriel as someone who may have changed irrevocably."

A group led by Aaron encounters some Whisperers in the eleventh season episode "Out of the Ashes". Renee Hansen for Undead Walking said that "This episode shows some excellent screen time for Aaron and the inner turmoil he is fighting. He is teamed up with Jerry, who always puts a positive spin on things no matter the circumstances, and Carol, who tries to be a voice of reason to him." Erik Kain for Forbes commented that with the Whisperers, "Aaron goes full torture-mode with one of them and there's a scuffle and ultimately Aaron has to cut the guy's hand off after he has a walker bite it as part of the interrogation." Alex McLevy for The A.V. Club said that "Carol is trying to learn empathy again, and Aaron's anger and fear were justified—but some acts can't just be shrugged off. Keith had to cut off his own hand, and that's on Aaron. So to leave him with a weapon and a group of people who are probably pretty pissed off at them, now? That’s not compassion; that’s foolhardy."
