= Abraham Ford =

- The Walking Dead character
- Abraham Ford, as he appears in the comic book series (left) and as portrayed by Michael Cudlitz in the television series (right).
- First appearance: Comic: Issue #53 (2008); Television: "Inmates" (2014)
- Last appearance: Comic: Issue #99 (2012); Television: "What Comes After" (2018)
- Created by: Robert Kirkman; Charlie Adlard
- Adapted by: Scott M. Gimple (The Walking Dead)
- Portrayed by: Michael Cudlitz

In-universe information
- Occupation: U.S. Army Sergeant; Construction Foreman for the Alexandria Safe-Zone; Comic: Sports Coach
- Family: Television: A.J. Ford (son); Becca Ford (daughter)
- Spouses: Comic: Beth Ford; Television: Ellen Ford
- Significant others: Rosita Espinosa; Comic: Holly; Television: Sasha Williams

Sgt. Abraham Ford (full name in the television series: Sgt. Abraham Alexander Ford) is a fictional character from the comic book series The Walking Dead and was portrayed by Michael Cudlitz in the American television series of the same name.

In both mediums Abraham travelled the country with his girlfriend Rosita Espinosa to escort Dr. Eugene Porter to Washington, D.C., where the supposed cure for the outbreak is located, eventually recruiting Rick Grimes' group to accompany them. Though a skilled shooter, Abraham displays aggressive outbursts and has volatile tendencies towards the other group members, but over time he gains a strong sense of respect for Rick and becomes one of his right-hand men. He is also displayed as being emotionally broken from the pain he endured, due to his family being killed by zombies. Eventually, Eugene is revealed to have lied and has no cure; Abraham lashes out at Eugene, and then becomes reclusive until the group find the Alexandria Safe-Zone, where Abraham becomes head of the construction crew. Over time, he and Eugene are able to make amends. Later, he and Rosita broke up, and he decided to pursue a relationship with Sasha, but the new romance did not last long, as Abraham was killed by Negan soon after. He was buried at Hilltop.

Cudlitz received acclaim for his portrayal of Abraham in the show and is noted for his numerous unique one-liners and catchphrases.

== Appearances ==
=== Comic book series ===
Abraham Ford, as depicted in the comic book series.

Abraham, Eugene, and Rosita were once part of a larger group based in Houston. Their camp was overrun a few weeks earlier, and Eugene has persuaded them to head to Washington, D.C., where he claims he was a scientist; Eugene says they're working on a cure there. The trio first appears at Hershel's farm shortly after the prison's destruction. They are at first held at gunpoint by Andrea until Abraham explains their story and they need to acquire supplies for their trip to Washington and invites them to come along. Though the group remains skeptical, and Abraham directly confronts Dale and yells at him which causes tensions between him and Andrea. Later a large pack of zombies finds the farm and Abraham takes them all out and informs the others they were part of a larger "herd" which will be coming their way and fires a gunshot to force their co-operation. Eventually Rick agrees and they pack up their supplies into their truck and leave the farm for good.

Initially, there is hostility between Abraham and the others, particularly Rick Grimes. When Maggie Greene attempts suicide, he comes close to placing a bullet in her head before she regains consciousness, even when Rick holds a gun to his head and orders him not to. Rick's arguing with him enrages Abraham, and Abraham almost kills him the next morning. A zombie interrupts his plan, and Abraham saves Rick instead.

During a detour back to Rick's hometown, they run into a group of bandits who attempt to rape Carl. Abraham assists in rescuing him and stops Carl from watching Rick disembowel one of them. The next morning, Rick and Abraham bond after they realize they have suffered similar losses.

After gathering some supplies from Rick and Carl's hometown, and recruiting Morgan Jones, the four make the trip back to the survivors. During this trip they stumble upon the "herd" (the largest they have seen), and immediately try to break through. Instead, they total their car. On foot, Carl is nearly killed, and Abraham rescues him.

They regroup with the rest of their team and head to DC. On the way, they stumble across two mysterious scavengers, and Abraham is wary of their true intentions. He insists to Rick that they follow anyway due to their limited options. They soon come across and integrate themselves into Alexandria, where Abraham (due to his physical strength) is made head of the construction crew, where he witnesses corruption with the other crew members sacrificing one of their own, a young woman named Holly. He stands up for her, which drives the two closer to one another, and eventually they hook up behind Rosita's back. Abraham initially feels guilt about cheating on Rosita, but rationalizes his action as normal because of the new world they're living in. He breaks off his relationship with Rosita and falls back into Holly's arms. At one point, Holly suggests he take over from Rick, though this never comes to light. Abraham continues to assist in daily zombie-slaying and muscle work as months go by.

He and Michonne later encounter Jesus and join Rick and a few others at the Hilltop community. They are ambushed on their way back by the Saviors, a ruthless gang that has been terrorizing the community. When they are back in Alexandria, he and Eugene go on a supply run, and are ambushed by Savior members. Their leader Dwight, right-hand man of Negan, puts an arrow through Abraham's head and takes Eugene hostage. Abraham's body is eventually discovered by Rick and Andrea and given a memorial service. His death devastates Holly and Rosita, who has forgiven him. Dwight is resented by everyone for some time for killing Abraham, but he professes that he had no choice as to not kill him would mean his wife Sherry would be punished, which is ultimately proven right. Regardless of Rick's eventual alliance with Dwight, many members of the group still dislike him for killing Abraham.

=== Television series ===
==== Season 4 ====
In the episode "Inmates", Abraham, Rosita, and Eugene meet survivors Tara and an unconscious Glenn on the road as they escape the ruins of the destroyed prison. In the episode "Claimed", Abraham ignores Glenn's insistence on finding his wife Maggie, as he says Eugene knows the cure to the virus and they must get to DC. The two get into a scuffle over it, but Glenn's determination to find Maggie outvotes Abraham. In the episode "Us", Abraham leaves Glenn and Tara into a tunnel and wishes them safe travels, but eventually come back to rescue them after meeting Maggie, Sasha, and Bob. Eugene manages to convince Abraham to go to Terminus with the others, as they might be able to obtain supplies and recruit others at Terminus to come to Washington. They all head to Terminus, where they are greeted by a woman named Mary. In the season finale "A", when Rick, his son Carl, and Michonne and Daryl are locked up in a shipping container by the residents of Terminus, it is revealed that Abraham and the rest have all been captured and are being held there as well. Rick declares that the people holding them are "gonna feel pretty stupid when they find out [...] they're screwin' with the wrong people."

==== Season 5 ====
In the season premiere "No Sanctuary", Abraham escapes Terminus with the group. In the episode "Strangers", Abraham talks to Rick and tries to convince him to go to DC, but he insists on staying in Father Gabriel Stokes (Seth Gilliam)'s church for the night and the others state that they do what Rick says and Abraham decides to wait. Later that night Abraham holds a toast during dinner praising their skills as survivors but also notes the danger it poses to their sanity. Rick agrees to go to DC. In the episode "Four Walls and a Roof", Abraham gets into a fight with Rick over leaving after Daryl, Carol and Bob go missing. A deal is made for Glenn and Maggie to leave after the night. Abraham then gives Rick a map, apologizing for his behavior and tells him to go to DC after he gets Daryl and Carol back. In the episode "Self Help", flashbacks show Abraham killing men to protect his family, but his wife and children are terrified by him and run off, only to be killed by walkers. Abraham almost commits suicide, but Eugene comes asking for help on a mission. In present day, Abraham goes increasingly frustrated with the setbacks on the way to DC, only for Eugene to reveal he is not a scientist. Abraham punches Eugene repeatedly, almost killing him. Rosita steps in his way to stop him, hand on her pistol. He walks off some distance and falls to his knees, crying. In the episode "Crossed", Abraham remains reclusive and on his knees in shock. Rosita is unable to get through to him. In mid-season finale "Coda", Abraham and his group return to the church with the firetruck in time to save Carl, Michonne, Gabriel and Judith from walkers though Abraham is still noticeably mad at an unconscious Eugene. In the episode "Them", the group decide to continue their journey to Washington D.C., but their van breaks down forcing them to walk but the group suffers from a drought. Abraham has taken to drinking heavily and tries to make short talk with Sasha and stops Eugene from trying bottles of water left on the road, as Rick fears it may be poisoned. When a pack of walkers arrives, Rick devises a plan to eliminate them without exhausting themselves by letting them fall into a ditch, with Abraham, Sasha, Michonne, Glenn and Maggie, but Sasha's recklessness almost gets Abraham killed when she cuts him. Eventually the group takes refuge inside a barn and are forced to hold the doors closed to keep walkers from entering. In the episode "The Distance", Maggie and Sasha bring in a stranger named Aaron and after Rick disbelieves his claim of a nearby community Abraham takes part in the barn's defense on Rick's orders. When Michonne, Glenn and Maggie are set on following Aaron's claim of there being cars nearby Rick orders Abraham and Rosita to accompany them, eventually finding an R.V. After clearing it out Abraham asks Rosita if she believed he was going to hurt her back at the fire truck, but she says no, knowing him better. The group returns to the barn and Rick finally decides to travel to their community but are temporarily delayed by a "herd" and Abraham leads half the group to a shelter with Aaron's boyfriend Eric. After the group resumes their travels, Abraham driving the R.V., they see the White House and Abraham smiles happy they made it but is soon angered when the R.V. breaks down but Glenn quickly points out where the backup battery is, puzzling Abraham to how Glenn knew where to find it (as Dale Horvath had previously taught him). Eventually the group arrives at Aaron's community: The Alexandria Safe-Zone.

In "Remember", the group enters Alexandria where they are interviewed by its leader Deanna Monroe who gives them two houses among themselves, but they decide to stay in one house the first night though Abraham and Sasha are more on guard than the others. In "Forget", Deanna holds a welcome party for the new group which Abraham attends with Rosita but they are troubled by the normalcy of it until they see beer and Abraham gets slightly drunk. Later he talks to Michonne about how their lives are finally looking better but also the difficulty of leaving behind the road and equally the danger of settling in which Michonne agrees on, after she humorously notes how drunk he is. In the episode "Spend", after having sex with Rosita, Abraham washes his face and appears stressed and joins Tobin's construction crew as they move materials from outside to expand the wall. However, Abraham briefly pauses appearing stressed again but is quickly occupied with a pack of walkers nearby and Francine is caught between them and though Tobin is willing to abandon her Abraham saves her, using a wrecking ball to kill the walkers attacking him while she uses his rifle to kill the walkers sneaking up on him. Afterward Abraham confronts Tobin over the matter, before Francine punches him, and as the others suggest heading back Abraham insists they continue and gives them directions to position guards and unload materials which they agree to. Tobin later tells Deanna of Abraham's actions, and she decides to assign him as leader of the construction crew. In the season finale "Conquer", following Rick and Pete's confrontation in the streets and him waving a revolver around Deanna considers kicking him out. Abraham meets with Rick, Glenn, Carol and Michonne to discuss the matter and Carol tells him to make up a story of having a gun out of concern for Jessie's safety, but Abraham asks their backup plan if they do not buy it. Rick then tells them that if things go bad he, Carol and Michonne will hold Deanna, Reg and Spencer hostage as Abraham and Glenn cover them so they can raid the armory. Later Abraham visits an unconscious Tara but is surprised to see Eugene and tries to sit down without waking him, but Rosita intentionally drops a dish to wake him up. Abraham and Eugene reconcile over their differences and Abraham admits to feeling guilty for almost killing him while Eugene also admits the guilt, he feels for lying in the first place and thanks him for getting them to Washington. Later Abraham attends Deanna's meeting with Carol, Eugene, Michonne, Maggie and defends Rick's actions just as Rick appears with a dead walker in his arms and stresses to the others that the living and dead will always try to get inside and they need to be ready. As a drunken Pete appears and kills Reg with Michonne's sword during an assassination attempt on Rick's life, Abraham angrily tackles the still-irate Pete and holds down his head as Rick executes him on Deanna's orders and witnesses the arrival of Morgan Jones, Aaron, and Daryl.

==== Season 6 ====
In the season premiere episode "First Time Again", Abraham carries Reg's corpse to the graveyard and appears highly saddened, drink whisky and pouring some on Reg's corpse as tribute, then sits on the porch of his house and plays with Reg's wedding ring. The next day Rick addresses the community and reveals the nearby quarry is overrun with walkers kept inside only by a few trucks at the exits, the reason Alexandria has avoided being overrun, which is in danger of collapsing and Rick proposes re-directing the herd onto the main road and away from Alexandria. Daryl is tasked with using himself as bait to lure the walkers onto the road while he uses his bike to stay ahead of them, and Sasha volunteers to take a car with him insisting he cannot do it alone and Abraham volunteers to accompany her. As part of the plan Abraham leads the construction team to one of the main roads to build a large barricade to prevent the herd veering off course but as Rick is leading the group around the area, going over the plan in detail Abraham asks Sasha if she's participating because she wants to die, but she smiles and says "no", leaving Abraham feeling nervous. At the quarry Rick recites his plan one last time for tomorrow but as he speaks the trucks on the upper hill topple over and the herd begins to break free towards Alexandria, forcing them to execute their plan at that moment instead. Sasha and Abraham take their car and travel with Daryl along the main road but Abraham asks if Sasha is good and she insists she is but questions why Abraham wanted to come if he's nervous, which he does not answer. As the herd begins to veer off Abraham briefly jumps out of the car and throws himself at the walkers to keep them following which concerns Sasha. However, as they are halfway through their plan a loud horn goes off, distracting half the herd away. In the episode "Thank You", Daryl insists on going to help Rick but Sasha and Abraham insist he stay but he chooses the former but Abraham and Sasha continue on mission. Eventually Daryl comes to his senses and rejoins them and they continue leading the herd away.

In the episode "Always Accountable", Abraham, Sasha and Daryl have driven 20 miles away as planned and begin their trip home but are ambushed by other survivors in a car who separate Daryl from them and wreck the car. Abraham moves in to kill a nearby trapped walker but Sasha holds him back since there could be more attackers and he reluctantly agrees, then they wander into a nearby town to find shelter so they can wait for Daryl to find them, marking the door "Dixon", but Sasha becomes uncomfortable when Abraham insists on needlessly killing walkers at the risk of exposing himself to greater danger. While waiting Sasha confronts Abraham and calls him reckless but he shrugs it off, reminding Sasha of her outburst at Deanna's welcoming party. While Sasha sleeps Abraham explores the building and finds a soldier's uniform and a picture of the soldier's family (himself, his wife and two children) reigniting his own grief. Abraham explores outside and finds an abandoned military truck with rocket heads and cigars and notices a walker stuck over the bridge has an RPG and attempts to retrieve it but becomes aggressive and yells right at it. Realizing he cannot reach it without getting killed, Abraham stops. The walker falls, but, miraculously, the RPG gets stuck on a wire, allowing Abraham to retrieve it. Abraham carries all his new-found equipment and brings it back to Sasha, and admits that she is right about his recklessness. He insists that he was shaken up by Reg and Pete's death since he thought finding Alexandria would be the end of their troubles, but now knows they will have some work to do, but still insists that they have everything set for the rest of their lives back home. Abraham also compliments Sasha for calling bullshit and confesses a romantic interest in her. Sasha implies that she could return affection for him also but insists that before anything he needs to work on himself which he smiles back at her and the two are eventually found by Daryl. Before leaving Abraham puts on the soldier's uniform and as they drive back he smiles to himself, signaling change in him.

In the mid-season premiere "No Way Out", on the way back to Alexandria, Abraham, Sasha and Daryl are stopped by a group of armed men on motorcycles. The leader of the gang informs the trio that their guns and truck now belong to a man named Negan before taking their sidearms. He orders one of the men to take Daryl to the back of the truck and inspect its cargo while Sasha and Abraham stay behind. After some conversation between Abraham, Sasha and the leader of the gang, as the latter is threatening to shoot them, the whole group of bikers explodes. Daryl then comes out from behind the truck holding an RPG, having subdued and killed the biker who went to check cargo with him, and leaves with Abraham and Sasha. Later when Glenn is swarmed by walkers back at Alexandria, Abraham and Sasha suddenly appear. Standing on top of the fuel truck, they are able to gun down the walkers and save Glenn. Sasha then helps the Alexandrians and Rick fight the mega walker herd, eventually succeeding.

In the episode "Knots Untie", Abraham first appears in this episode returning from a patrol with Sasha. Sasha tells him that she and Eugene are going to switch patrols for a bit. Abraham is slightly saddened by this news but she flashes him a peace sign referencing to the peace sign he gave to her after Pete and Reg died. He promptly returns the sign to her. The scene then flashes forward to Abraham in bed with Rosita who's thinking about Sasha. Abraham tells her that he loves her and Rosita kisses him and tells him to prove it. She gives him a necklace she made and tells him to meet her in the shower. Abraham is later seen with Carl, Glenn, Rick who are talking to Jesus in Rick's house. Jesus explains that he is a recruiter for a settlement not too far away from here and that he trades with other communities. He offers to take Rick and a few others to go to the Hilltop Colony to trade for food to which Rick accepts. Abraham goes with Daryl, Glenn, Michonne, Rick and Maggie to the hilltop colony. Inside the RV, Abraham quietly asks Glenn if he was intending to have a child with Maggie to which he says yes but is confused as to why Abraham would ask that. Abraham is then seen with Rick and the others who are about to enter a building to save a few other members of the hilltop colony. Inside, Abraham draws his knife, grabs a member of the hilltop, Freddie, by the throat and nearly stabs him before being stopped by Rick. Inside the RV Freddie explains to how he saw his dead wife when Abraham nearly stabs him to which Abraham looks on remembering his dead wife. At the Hilltop, Abraham draws his rifle on Kal and Eduardo before Jesus calmly tells Rick and the others to trust him and that the hilltop is safe. Abraham enters the hilltop and takes in the sight and listens to Jesus's talk about the history of the place. Abraham enters the Barrington house and notes how impressive the place is. Abraham and the others meet Gregory who rudely state that Rick and the others should get cleaned up. Later, Abraham asks Daryl how long he knew that Rick and Michonne were a thing to which he says he knew not too long ago. Outside Abraham is with everyone when Ethan, Crystal and Andy return from a failed supply meeting with the saviors. When Ethan stabs Gregory, Abraham immediately tackles Andy who tries to attack Rick. Despite being significantly stronger than Andy, Abraham does not fight back and lets Andy choke him. As Andy chokes him, he hears Sasha's voice and right before Andy can kill him, Daryl comes along and snaps his arm. Daryl looks over to Abraham and asks if he is okay to which he says he is, seemingly un-phased that he almost died. As he gets up he leaves behind Rosita's necklace. Abraham is seen with Rick, Jesus and the others who discuss the threat of Negan and the saviors. Rick tells Jesus that Daryl, Abraham and Sasha had a run in with the saviors a few months back to which Abraham recalls the event, calling it a barbecue. He is later seen loading food into the RV. As Rick and the others are leaving the hilltop, Daryl passes him a photo of Glenn and Maggie's unborn child to which Abraham looks to Glenn and smiles.

In the episode "Not Tomorrow Yet", Abraham breaks up with Rosita and moved in with Sasha. All three of them then participate in the assault on the Saviors' compound. In the episode "Twice as Far", Abraham and Eugene go to an industrial machine shop, which Eugene intends to use to manufacture ammunition. After some tense moments, they come to an understanding of mutual respect. In the episode "East", Abraham arrives at the watch post to take over from Sasha. She hands him a cigar and they talk while Rosita watches them. When Glenn and Michonne prepare to go after Daryl, Abraham insists on going with them. Rosita tells him to cover her shift, claiming she knows where Daryl is going. Abraham opens the gate for Rick when he returns from searching for Carol. He tells him that Morgan is still looking for her and asks where Michonne is. Abraham says that she is still out there and asks Rick if he is worried, to which he says he is. They share their fears over getting close to someone again. "I think I'm that much more ready to tear the world a brand new asshole," Abraham says. Rick smiles and nods.

In the season finale "Last Day on Earth", when Maggie starts feeling ill, Abraham joins Rick and the others to drive the RV towards the Hilltop. The group encounters a group of saviors led by Simon, who has a conversation with Rick about the last day on Earth. Later, the group is attacked by hidden saviors and encounter several road blocks. During the night, the group decides to travel on foot and after a brief conversation, Abraham lets Eugene drive the RV away. During their mission, the group ends up surrounded by Saviors. Negan soon introduces himself and gives a speech before deciding whom to kill as punishment for Rick's group.

==== Season 7 ====
In the season premiere "The Day Will Come When You Won't Be", Abraham is revealed to be Negan's chosen victim. As he gives Sasha the peace sign Negan smacks his head with Lucille. As Abraham sits back up, he defiantly tells Negan to "suck my nuts", and Negan bludgeons his head repeatedly until it is completely smashed in. After Daryl angrily punches Negan in retaliation, he then kills Glenn in the same manner. After Negan and the Saviors leave Abraham and Glenn's corpses are loaded onto a truck Maggie and Sasha take to Hilltop. Rick then hallucinates an idealistic lifestyle in Alexandria with everyone, Abraham and Glenn included, eating dinner together. In "Go Getters", Abraham and Glenn are shown to be buried together at Hilltop.

In the season finale, Abraham is shown in a flashback with Sasha as the two discuss the plans from season 6 to bring Maggie to the Hilltop. It is revealed during the episode that Sasha had ingested a poison capsule provided by Eugene in an attempt to foil Negan's plans at Alexandria. During the drive from the Sanctuary to Alexandria, Sasha was shown recalling the conversation with Abraham prior to joining the group before they left and were ultimately intercepted by the Saviors.

== Casting ==
The Abraham, Eugene and Rosita characters were first announced in a casting call (coded "John Tyler") for Episode 10 in July 2013. The character's real name and the actor playing the role (Michael Cudlitz) were confirmed in The Hollywood Reporter.

== Critical reception ==
Dan Phillips for IGN praised Abraham's introduction in issue #53. For the following issue, he went into further depth saying: "Abraham [...] brings a ton of entertainment value, as he's just as adept at killing zombies as anyone we've met so far in the series, and far more adept at cursing. His dialogue is hilariously vulgar, but in an honest and direct way clearly developed before the plague and then refined by a road of hardship."

Abraham was popular amongst the fans, primarily for his strength and his unique one-liners and catchphrases. Since the character was killed off in the seventh season premiere, fans have hoped that Abraham would cross over to The Walking Dead spin-off series, Fear the Walking Dead. Cudlitz responded this at a convention saying, "That'd be awesome."

Noel Murray of Rolling Stone ranked Abraham Ford 13th in a list of 30 best Walking Dead characters, saying, "A tip of the Army helmet to Michael Cudlitz, who gave the character an unforgettable 'stache, a peerless sense of humor ('When you were, uh, pouring the Bisquick, were you trying to make pancakes?') and a genuine sense of presence. He remained proud and brave all the way to his end at Negan's hands, which he met with a defiant glare and a growly, 'Suck my nuts.'"
