= Try (The Walking Dead) =

- The Walking Dead episode
- Rick draws his gun at the Alexandria Safe-Zone people after a fight with Jessie's abusive husband, Pete.
- Episode no.: Season 5 Episode 15
- Directed by: Michael E. Satrazemis
- Written by: Angela Kang
- Cinematography by: Stephen Campbell
- Editing by: Todd Desrosiers
- Original air date: March 22, 2015

Guest appearances
- Tovah Feldshuh as Deanna Monroe; Alexandra Breckenridge as Jessie Anderson; Ross Marquand as Aaron; Austin Nichols as Spencer Monroe; Jason Douglas as Tobin; Austin Abrams as Ron Anderson; Corey Brill as Pete Anderson; Steve Coulter as Reg Monroe; Major Dodson as Sam Anderson; Katelyn Nacon as Enid; Michael Traynor as Nicholas

Episode chronology
← Previous "Spend"	Next → "Conquer"
- The Walking Dead season 5

"Try" is the fifteenth and penultimate episode of the fifth season of the post-apocalyptic horror television series The Walking Dead, which aired on AMC on March 22, 2015. It was written by Angela Kang and directed by Michael E. Satrazemis.

While grieving for Aiden, Deanna begins to reconsider her choice to bring in Rick's group after Nicholas lies about the circumstances of Noah's death, as tensions begin to rise between Rick and Pete over the latter's abuse towards Jessie, and Rick's brutality begins to boil into insanity. The group also grieves over Noah's death, with Glenn becoming traumatized while Sasha is overwhelmed with grief and begins hunting walkers, forcing Michonne and Rosita to chase her. Aaron and Daryl continue to look for survivors while Carl and Enid bond.

== Plot ==
Deanna and her family mourn Aiden's death when Carol leaves a tuna pasta bake and a note of condolences on Deanna's doorstep. Deanna picks up the note leaving the pasta behind and afterwards proceeds to burn the card. She then watches a video of Nicholas describing the incident, in which he lies and places blame on Glenn for Aiden and Noah's deaths, while Glenn relates the true series of events to Rick. Deanna prohibits them from carrying firearms and from leaving the Safe-Zone while she investigates.

The next morning, Rosita tells Michonne that Sasha has gone missing from her post in the tower. Worried, they venture outside the walls to look for her. They find several dead walkers and realize Sasha is actively hunting them. They track her down and help her eliminate a large pack of walkers, which leads to an outburst from Sasha.

Rick approaches Deanna about Pete's abusive behavior, and is shocked when Deanna reveals she already knows about it. Since Pete is a surgeon, his skills are invaluable to Alexandria and Deanna is not willing to have Pete separated from Jessie or executed. If it comes down to it, she says that she will have Pete exiled. Rick believes exiling Pete will only put Alexandria in danger, but Deanna refuses to listen.

Meanwhile, Carl follows Enid outside the walls. She reveals she knows Carl has been following her, but allows him to come with her. They bond over their shared experiences as survivors from the outside, but are forced to hide inside a hollow tree from a walker horde. Enid says the world belongs to the walkers, and humans just live in it. They look into each other's eyes, and Carl touches Enid's hand for a second before pulling back.

Glenn confronts Nicholas and tells him men like him should have died to the walkers, but he was lucky that the Alexandria's walls came up in time. Glenn tells Nicholas never to set foot outside of the walls again. Fearing that Glenn will reveal his cowardice, Nicholas later retrieves a pistol, the same one that Rick had stashed away but lost.

Elsewhere outside the walls, Daryl and Aaron notice more walkers are coming into the area. They investigate a light in the distance and come across freshly-severed limbs and a woman who had been tied to a tree and eaten alive by walkers, her body reanimating as they find her, killing the resultant walker. There is a "W" carved into her forehead.

Rick talks to Jessie again and reveals that he knows Pete is abusing her. Jessie assures Rick she can fix her relationship with Pete, but Rick is not convinced. He promises to protect Jessie, and she agrees to let him protect her just as Pete returns home. Jessie stands up for herself and orders Pete to leave, but Pete grows angry and the two men begin to fight. Their fight makes its way to the street as the entire town watches. Jessie and Carl attempt to stop the fight, but fail. Rick finally subdues Pete in a headlock. Deanna orders Rick to stand down, but Rick doesn't acknowledge, instead warning Pete that if he harms either Jessie or Sam again, he will kill him. Deanna once again orders Rick to withdraw, but Rick points his revolver at the crowd and goes on a rant, telling Deanna how Alexandria is too complacent and will eventually destroy itself under her leadership, and that the way to survive is to have people like Pete executed. Michonne eventually silences him mid-rant by knocking him unconscious.

== Reception ==
=== Ratings ===
Upon airing, the episode was watched by 13.757 million American viewers with an 18-49 rating of 7.0, a slight decrease in viewership from the previous episode which had 13.781 million viewers with an 18-49 rating of 7.0.

=== Critical reception ===
The episode received critical acclaim. Matt Fowler of IGN gave the episode an 8.6 out of 10 saying "'Try' kept the gripping, anxious Alexandria story moving along while also planting a seeds for next Sunday's finale. The brawl between Rick and Pete was rightly intense." TVLine named Andrew Lincoln the "Performer of the Week" for his performance in the episode, and called him "TV's most underrated performer".

Zach Handlen of The A.V. Club graded the episode a B+, talking about how "a feeling that all of this friendliness and goodwill and calm is just going to make the bad news worse when it finally arrives. The problem is, to keep things from boiling just yet, we need to keep following various subplots that aren’t anywhere near as interesting as the main question of just what the hell Rick is planning on doing." He then commented positively on Rick's scenes, saying "Rick has been on the edge for a while now, but it’s fascinating here to watch him rant at the townsfolk, because part of what he’s saying [...] is legitimately true. That doesn’t make him sound reasonable or even sane, but it also makes him impossible to dismiss. The show has tried to do ambiguous conflicts before, and fumbled them because it’s hard to work up a lot of tension when the “bad” guys are too indistinct to be a clear threat. But there's tension right now because the Alexandrians’ apparent decency works in perfect contrast with our heroes’ rugged desperation."
