= Spend (The Walking Dead) =

- The Walking Dead episode
- Glenn watches Noah get devoured.
- Episode no.: Season 5 Episode 14
- Directed by: Jennifer Lynch
- Written by: Matthew Negrete
- Cinematography by: Stephen Campbell
- Editing by: Dan Liu
- Original air date: March 15, 2015

Guest appearances
- Tovah Feldshuh as Deanna Monroe; Tyler James Williams as Noah; Alexandra Breckenridge as Jessie Anderson; Daniel Bonjour as Aiden Monroe; Jason Douglas as Tobin; Corey Brill as Pete Anderson; Steve Coulter as Reg Monroe; Major Dodson as Sam Anderson; Ted Huckabee as Bruce; Dahlia Legault as Francine; Michael Traynor as Nicholas

Episode chronology
← Previous "Forget"	Next → "Try"
- The Walking Dead season 5

"Spend" is the fourteenth episode of the fifth season of the post-apocalyptic horror television series The Walking Dead, which aired on AMC on March 15, 2015. It was written by Matthew Negrete and directed by Jennifer Lynch. It marked Tyler James Williams' final appearance as supporting character Noah and Daniel Bonjour's final appearance as Aiden Monroe.

== Plot ==
Gabriel, torn over by his loss of faith, tears up a Bible. Elsewhere, Noah meets with Deanna's husband Reg to become his student so he'll know what to do to keep the walls up. Noah then goes to meet Glenn, Tara, Aiden, and Nicholas, who are going on a repair mission, to get parts needed from a nearby warehouse to repair the solar power system. Eugene is reluctant to go, but is the only one that can identify the required parts.

As Rick makes his rounds, he passes Jessie's house and notices her working on one of her sculptures, which has been vandalized. Rick offers to find the culprit, but she brushes him off. Rick is later approached by Jessie's husband Pete, who tries to cultivate a friendship with him.

Glenn's group reaches the warehouse, and although the group is initially cautious, Aiden shoots a walker wearing a grenade, leading to Tara suffering a severe head injury. After the group rescues Tara, Eugene promises to protect her, with the others going off to find Aiden. Eugene is able to overcome his cowardice to evacuate Tara to their van which he uses to lure the walkers away from outside the building. The other three find Aiden still alive but impaled against a wall. Nicholas, panicking at the onslaught of walkers, tells Aiden that running is "who we are", and tries to escape through revolving doors in the front of the warehouse. Glenn and Noah try to free Aiden, but realizing it is impossible, they leave him to be attacked.

Meanwhile, Abraham helps a crew to extend Alexandria's walls. When the crew is ambushed by walkers, trapping their lookout Francine (Dahlia Legault), the foreman Tobin sees no way to save her and orders them to abandon her. Abraham instead races in to help rescue her, later assisted by other members of the crew. With the walkers dispatched, Abraham takes leadership of the group. Tobin later resigns his position to Deanna, Reg, and Maggie, admitting that Abraham is a better leader. Deanna agrees, but expresses her concern to Maggie that Rick's group is quickly filling in positions of leadership in the community. Gabriel later speaks to Deanna, expressing his doubts on the sincerity of Rick's group and not to trust them, unaware that Maggie has overheard them.

Carol is visited a few times by Jessie's son, Sam, who keeps asking for cookies. To get rid of him, Carol tells him she will only make them if he steals two bars of chocolate from the town's food storage. Sam returns with the chocolate. While waiting for the cookies to bake, he admits to breaking Jessie's statue, then asks for one of her guns. When Carol asks him why, he runs off.

Back at the warehouse, Glenn and Noah follow Nicholas to stop him but all three end up surrounded by walkers and stuck in the revolving door. To save himself, Nicholas ignores Glenn and opens the door far enough for the walkers to grab and drag Noah out, where he is consumed; a horrified Glenn watches but can do nothing. Nicholas catches up to Eugene in the van and threatens to leave him behind if they don't go now. Glenn, having made it out of the door, knocks Nicholas out. Though they have collected the parts, the ride back to Alexandria is somber and they hold Nicholas under gunpoint.

Carol goes to the Anderson home to try to talk to Sam or Jessie, but is coldly turned away by Pete, arousing her suspicion. When Rick returns home, Carol tells him that Pete is abusing Jessie and maybe Sam, and the only way to stop it is to kill Pete.

== Reception ==
=== Ratings ===
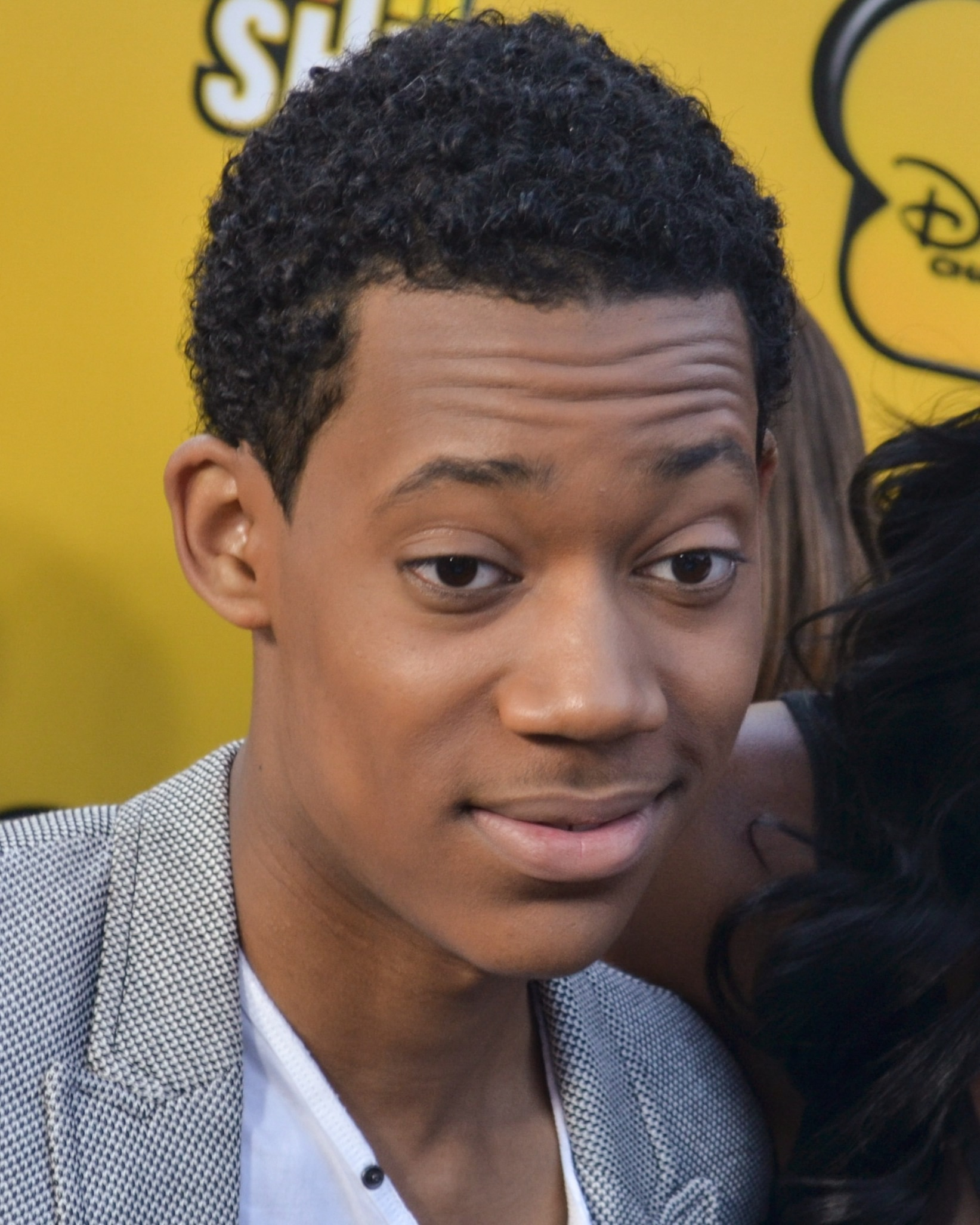
Tyler James Williams made his final appearance as Noah in "Spend".

Upon airing, the episode was watched by 13.781 million American viewers with an 18-49 rating of 7.0, a decrease in viewership from the previous episode which had 14.534 million viewers, and a slight decrease in 18-49 ratings from the previous episode's 7.3. The Australian broadcast was watched by 67,000 viewers, making it the third most-watched telecast on pay television that day.

=== Critical reception ===
The episode received critical acclaim. Matt Fowler of IGN gave it a 9.2 out of 10 saying "'Spend' was a damn solid episode that, in just one week, flipped me around on the whole 'Rick taking over Alexandria' situation. Full of huge, tense moments and surprising deaths, this chapter now has me back on Team Ricktatorship."
