= No Way Out (The Walking Dead) =

- The Walking Dead episode
- Sasha and Abraham help Maggie off the platform after saving Glenn's life.
- Episode no.: Season 6 Episode 9
- Directed by: Greg Nicotero
- Written by: Seth Hoffman
- Cinematography by: Michael E. Satrazemis
- Editing by: Avi Youabian
- Original air date: February 14, 2016
- Running time: 43 minutes

Guest appearances
- Merritt Wever as Dr. Denise Cloyd; Corey Hawkins as Heath; Major Dodson as Sam Anderson; Benedict Samuel as Owen; Jason Douglas as Tobin; Austin Abrams as Ron Anderson; Katelyn Nacon as Enid; Ann Mahoney as Olivia; Christopher Berry as Bud; Vanessa Cloke as Anna; Ted Huckabee as Bruce; Mandi Christine Kerr as Barbara; Dahlia Legault as Francine; Brody Rose as Young Boy; David Marshall Silverman as Kent; Jordan Woods-Robinson as Eric Raleigh

Episode chronology
← Previous "Start to Finish"	Next → "The Next World"
- The Walking Dead season 6

"No Way Out" is the ninth episode and mid-season premiere of the sixth season of the post-apocalyptic horror television series The Walking Dead, which aired on AMC on February 14, 2016. The episode was written by Seth Hoffman and directed by Greg Nicotero.

Continuing from the previous cliffhanger, Rick Grimes (Andrew Lincoln), Carl Grimes (Chandler Riggs), Michonne (Danai Gurira) and the Anderson family move through the herd while Denise Cloyd (Merritt Wever) deals with being Alpha Wolf's hostage. Meanwhile, Daryl Dixon (Norman Reedus), Sasha Williams (Sonequa Martin-Green) and Abraham Ford (Michael Cudlitz) are forced to surrender their weapons to a threatening force of biker men, led by the unseen and enigmatic Negan. Most of the episode deals with the herd invasion in the Alexandria Safe-Zone. The episode adapts material from "Volume 14: No Way Out" from the comic book series of the same name. The injury of Carl Grimes and the deaths of the Andersons are major moments from the comic book adapted to screen.

This episode marks the final appearance of Alexandra Breckenridge as Jessie Anderson, as she is killed off along with her two sons, Ron (Austin Abrams) and Sam (Major Dodson). Their deaths were one of the many comic book moments adapted into this episode. The episode received critical acclaim and is generally considered to be one of the best of the series.

While the episode serves as the mid-season premiere, it was the eighth filmed episode overall, succeeded by the Morgan Jones (Lennie James) flashback episode, "Here's Not Here", in production order.

== Plot ==
Abraham, Sasha, and Daryl are stopped by a group of Saviors, who tell them that their property belongs to Negan. The group's leader instructs a Savior to take Daryl to the back of the fuel truck. Daryl kills the Savior and uses an RPG launcher to annihilate the Savior group.

In Alexandria, Rick, Carl, Gabriel, Michonne, Judith, Jessie, Ron, and Sam use walker viscera to camouflage themselves and escape Jessie's house. Rick plans to lead the walkers to a quarry, while Gabriel takes Judith to his church. Sam begins crying and is devoured by walkers. Jessie wails in anguish, also causing her to be eaten. Ron aims his pistol at Rick before being stabbed by Michonne. Ron fires the gun, inadvertently shooting Carl's right eye.

Meanwhile, the Wolf hides with Denise, waiting for an opportunity to slip through the walkers and escape. When there is a clear route over the wall they make their move, but the Wolf goes back to save a faltering Denise and is bitten in the process. Denise makes a deal to save his life if he gets her to the infirmary. While Denise puts a tourniquet around his arm, the Wolf questions why he endangered himself to save her and she, a psychiatrist, suggests that he's changed and become more like the Alexandrians.

Carol searches Morgan's home for "other surprises" and he apologizes for hurting her. Not convinced, Carol responds that she should have killed Morgan. Carol looks out the window and shoots the Wolf as he passes, and shouts for Denise to run and is shocked when the Wolf, even as he is swarmed and eaten by walkers, echoes Carol's calls for Denise to go and save herself. The Wolf later re-animates as a walker and is put down by Morgan, who apologizes as he kills it.

Denise manages to get to the infirmary where she begins helping Carl. Realizing there's nothing for him to do at the infirmary, Rick goes outside and begins an onslaught against the walkers. Once Carl is stitched up, Michonne, Heath, Aaron, and Spencer rush outside to join Rick. Their actions motivate others of Rick's group and many Alexandrians to join the battle, with Eugene recognizing this will be a moment in history where everyone would be counted, and Gabriel preaching that God has saved them by making them brave enough to fight. Glenn creates a diversion so Enid can get to Maggie on the shaky lookout tower, but is swarmed and saved by the timely arrival of Daryl, Abraham, and Sasha, the latter two shooting their assault rifles from atop the fuel truck.

Glenn opens the gate so Maggie and Enid can climb down the fuel truck, and they with Sasha and Abraham cover Daryl who fills a pond with fuel and ignites it with the RPG launcher. The enormous pool of fire in the night immediately draws the attention of the walkers. This takes pressure off of those fighting just as they were about to be overwhelmed, allowing them to gain the upper hand and continue relentlessly. The next morning, the survivors regroup after having killed every walker. Rick pleads with his unconscious son to pull through, hopeful for the future as the Alexandrians have proven they have what it takes to live, now believing that Deanna's plans could be achieved. Carl's fingers close around Rick's hand in seeming response.

== Reception ==
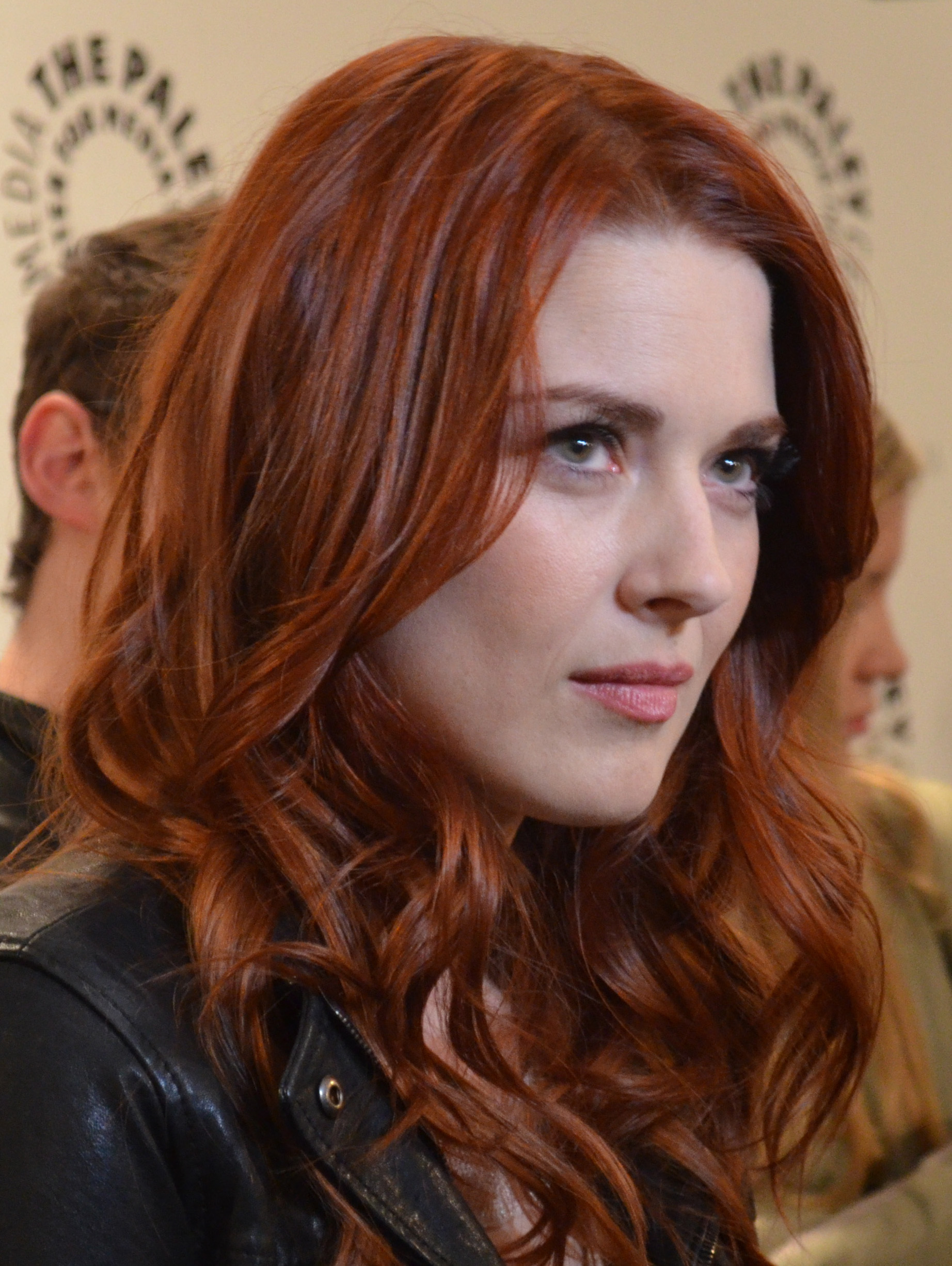
"No Way Out" marked the last appearance of Alexandra Breckenridge as Jessie Anderson.

=== Critical reception ===
The episode received critical acclaim and is generally considered to be one of the best of the series. On Rotten Tomatoes, it holds a 97% with an average rating of 8.28 out of 10, based on 34 reviews. The critics' consensus reads: "No Way Out" is a brutally entertaining rebound from a lackluster first half of the season, re-energized with arresting, jaw-dropping developments.

=== Ratings ===
The episode averaged a 6.8 rating in adults 18-49, with 13.742 million viewers overall. This is both a decrease from the Season 6 mid-season finale, which averaged a 7.0 rating and 13.981 million viewers overall, as well as a decrease from the Season 5 mid-season premiere, which received an 8.0 in adults 18-49, with 15.64 million viewers overall.

Including Live+3 viewing, the episode was watched by 19.07 million viewers.

=== Accolades ===
Year	Award	Category	Nominee(s)	Result	Ref.
2016	68th Primetime Creative Arts Emmy Awards	Outstanding Prosthetic Makeup for a Series, Limited Series, Movie or Special	Greg Nicotero, Jake Garber, Gino Crognale, Kevin Wasner, Garrett Immel, Kerrin Jackson, and Carey Jones	Nominated	
2016	68th Primetime Creative Arts Emmy Awards	Outstanding Special Visual Effects in a Supporting Role		Nominated	
