= Forget (The Walking Dead) =

- The Walking Dead episode
- Sasha leaves the walls of Alexandria to practice shooting with photo frames of dead family members.
- Episode no.: Season 5 Episode 13
- Directed by: David Boyd
- Written by: Corey Reed
- Cinematography by: Michael E. Satrazemis
- Editing by: Julius Ramsay
- Original air date: March 8, 2015

Guest appearances
- Tovah Feldshuh as Deanna Monroe; Tyler James Williams as Noah; Alexandra Breckenridge as Jessie Anderson; Ross Marquand as Aaron; Austin Nichols as Spencer Monroe; Daniel Bonjour as Aiden Monroe; Jason Douglas as Tobin; Austin Abrams as Ron Anderson; Corey Brill as Pete Anderson; Steve Coulter as Reg Monroe; Major Dodson as Sam Anderson; Mandi Christine Kerr as Barbara; Ann Mahoney as Olivia; Elijah Marcano as Mikey; Tiffany Morgan as Erin; Maia Moss-Fife as Woman; Jordan Woods-Robinson as Eric Raleigh; David Marshall Silverman as Kent; Susie Spear as Mrs. Neudermeyer; Michael Traynor as Nicholas

Episode chronology
← Previous "Remember"	Next → "Spend"
- The Walking Dead season 5

"Forget" is the thirteenth episode of the fifth season of the post-apocalyptic horror television series The Walking Dead, which aired on AMC on March 8, 2015. The episode was written by Corey Reed and directed by David Boyd. The events of the episode adapt material from "Volume 12", "Issue #72" of the comic book series. In the episode, Rick and the others try to settle in with the community of Alexandria at Deanna Monroe's party. However, some of the characters are unable to adjust to new life after their struggles on the road such as Sasha Williams, who has PTSD over her losses. Meanwhile, Carol Peletier devises a plan to steal back the group's weapons undercover.

This episode marks the first appearance of Spencer Monroe, portrayed by Austin Nichols, a prominent character from the graphic novels. It also features the introductions of Tobin, a member of the construction crew from the graphic novels. "Forget" also marks the final appearance of Beth Greene (Emily Kinney) and Tyreese Williams (Chad L. Coleman), who appear briefly in a flashback to Sasha.

The episode received positive acclaim, with many praising the continuing Alexandria Safe-Zone story arc.

== Plot ==
Sasha wakes up and glances at several family portraits left behind in her new house. Later that day, she takes them outside the walls to use as target practice. Finally she sits down on a tree stump, quietly saying to the walkers, "Come and get me."

In the woods, Rick, Daryl, and Carol start scheming to steal back their weapons. A walker creeps up on them, which Carol shoots multiple times before finally killing it, to make it seem like they were practicing. The trio notices the letter "W" carved in the walker's forehead. Back at Rick's house, he and Michonne discuss the reasons why they have been made town constables and wonder if it's part of a larger plan.

Elsewhere in the woods, Daryl catches Aaron following him, and together they go hunting when they come across a black horse Aaron calls Buttons which he has been trying to catch for months. The horse is spooked away by some walkers, and later others corner and attack it. Aaron and Daryl kill the walkers, and Aaron regretfully puts down the mortally wounded horse.

Meanwhile, Deanna explains a bit more about Rick and Michonne's job securing the community. She explains that Maggie will be helping her with politics and her vision is that one day the community will have a government. Outside, Deanna tells Rick she cannot have everyone walking around with guns. Sasha approaches them, saying she wants to man the clock tower with her rifle and displays her eagerness to have as "many shifts as possible" in the tower; Rick endorses Sasha as his group's sniper but Deanna insists on Sasha attending a welcoming party before considering her further.

Deanna invites the entire community to the welcoming party. Rick meets Jessie's husband, Peter Anderson (Corey Brill), and their son, Sam, and later gives Jessie a kiss on the cheek. Daryl skips the party, so Aaron invites him to dinner along with Eric, and shows Daryl their garage full of old motorcycle parts. Aaron tells Daryl that he will need to construct a bike because Aaron wants him to replace Eric as a recruiter for Alexandria. Meanwhile, members of the group that attend the party have trouble adjusting to their new surroundings: Abraham and Michonne discuss the difficulty of leaving behind the road and its dangers, and Sasha has flashbacks of her recent traumas and storms out after an outburst.

While the party is underway, Carol, having already unlatched a window, sneaks into the storeroom where the guns are being held and takes three pistols from a bin as well as a small chocolate ration. Jessie's son Sam catches her and says he will tell his mother what he saw. Carol persuades him to remain silent with the promise of cookies, and a threat of tying him to a tree for walkers to eat if he breaks his silence.

At their meeting spot in the woods, Carol hands both Rick and Daryl a revolver, but Daryl refuses. Rick goes for a walk in Alexandria, where he sees Jessie and Pete, and briefly reaches toward his revolver. He hears a noise from outside the wall and runs in its direction, where a lone walker is banging on it from the other side. Rick puts his hand on the wall and appears to take some satisfaction in reconnecting with the animalistic life outside the walls.

== Production ==
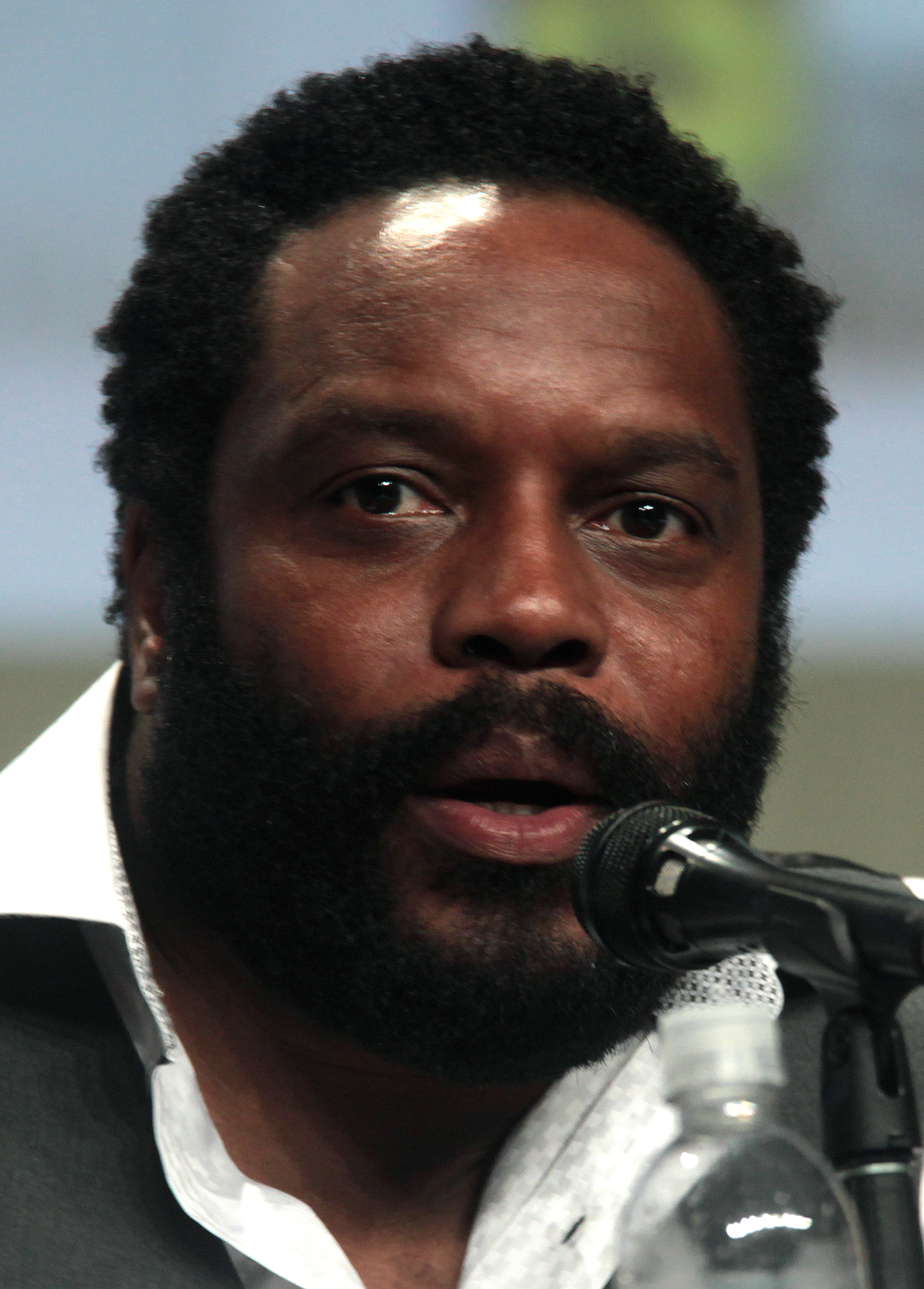
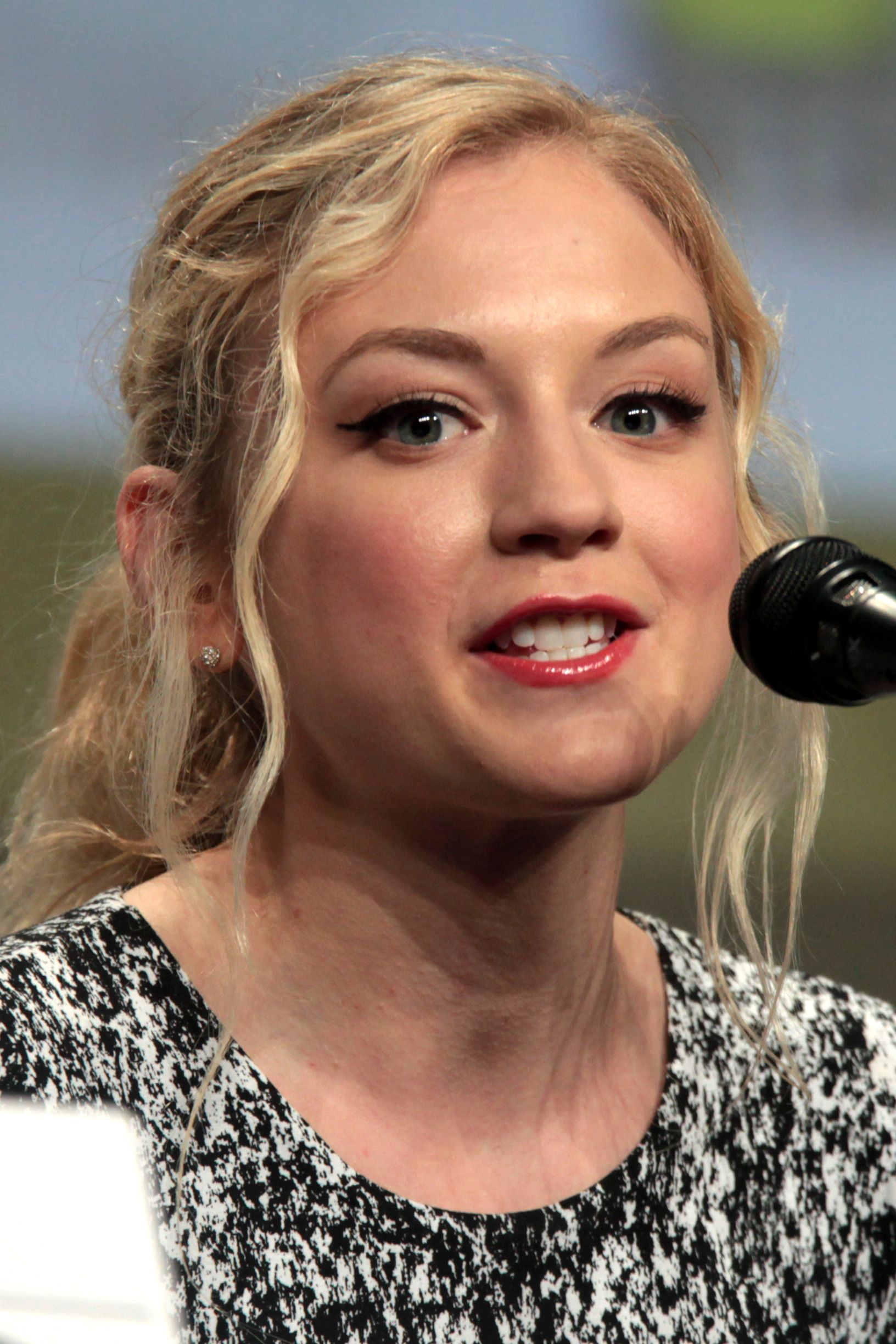
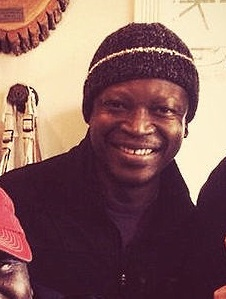
Chad L. Coleman (Tyreese Williams) (left), Emily Kinney (Beth Greene) (center), and Lawrence Gilliard Jr. (Bob Stookey) (right) appear in this episode throughout Sasha's flashbacks.

The episode was written by Corey Reed and directed by David Boyd. It marks the final overall appearances of Emily Kinney as Beth Greene and Chad L. Coleman as Tyreese Williams in a flashback sequence. Lawrence Gilliard Jr. briefly appears as Bob Stookey but he remains uncredited. Guest appearances include Tovah Feldshuh as Deanna Monroe, Tyler James Williams as Noah, Alexandra Breckenridge as Jessie Anderson.

"Forget" adapts material from "Volume 13: Too Far Gone" in Robert Kirkman's source material. Differences within the episode include Carol Peletier substituting Glenn Rhee in stealing the guns back, Sasha Williams' outburst substituting Michonne's and Daryl Dixon refusing the stolen guns instead of Andrea. Jessie cutting Rick's hair instead of Olivia. Sasha also obtains Andrea's marksmanship role within the safe-zone on the look-out tower.

== Reception ==
=== Ratings ===
Upon airing, the episode was watched by 14.534 million American viewers with an 18-49 rating of 7.3, an increase in viewership from the previous episode which had 14.43 million viewers, and a slight decrease in 18-49 ratings from the previous episode's 7.5.

The Australian broadcast was watched by 86,000 viewers, making it the seventh most-watched broadcast on pay television that day. In New Zealand, it was the fifth highest-rated timeshifted broadcast, with 33,330 viewers.

=== Critical reception ===
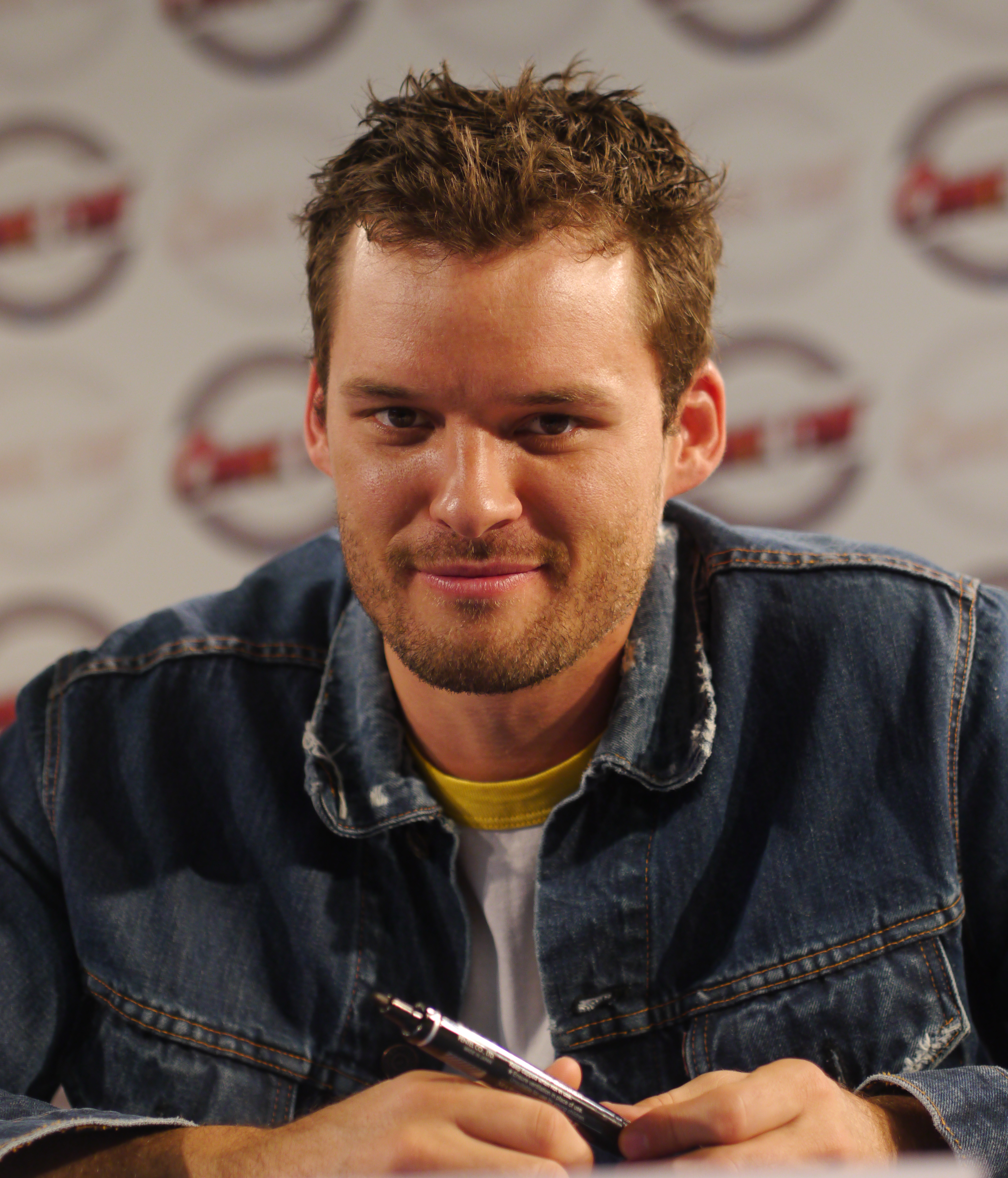
Austin Nichols made his first appearance as Spencer Monroe in this episode.

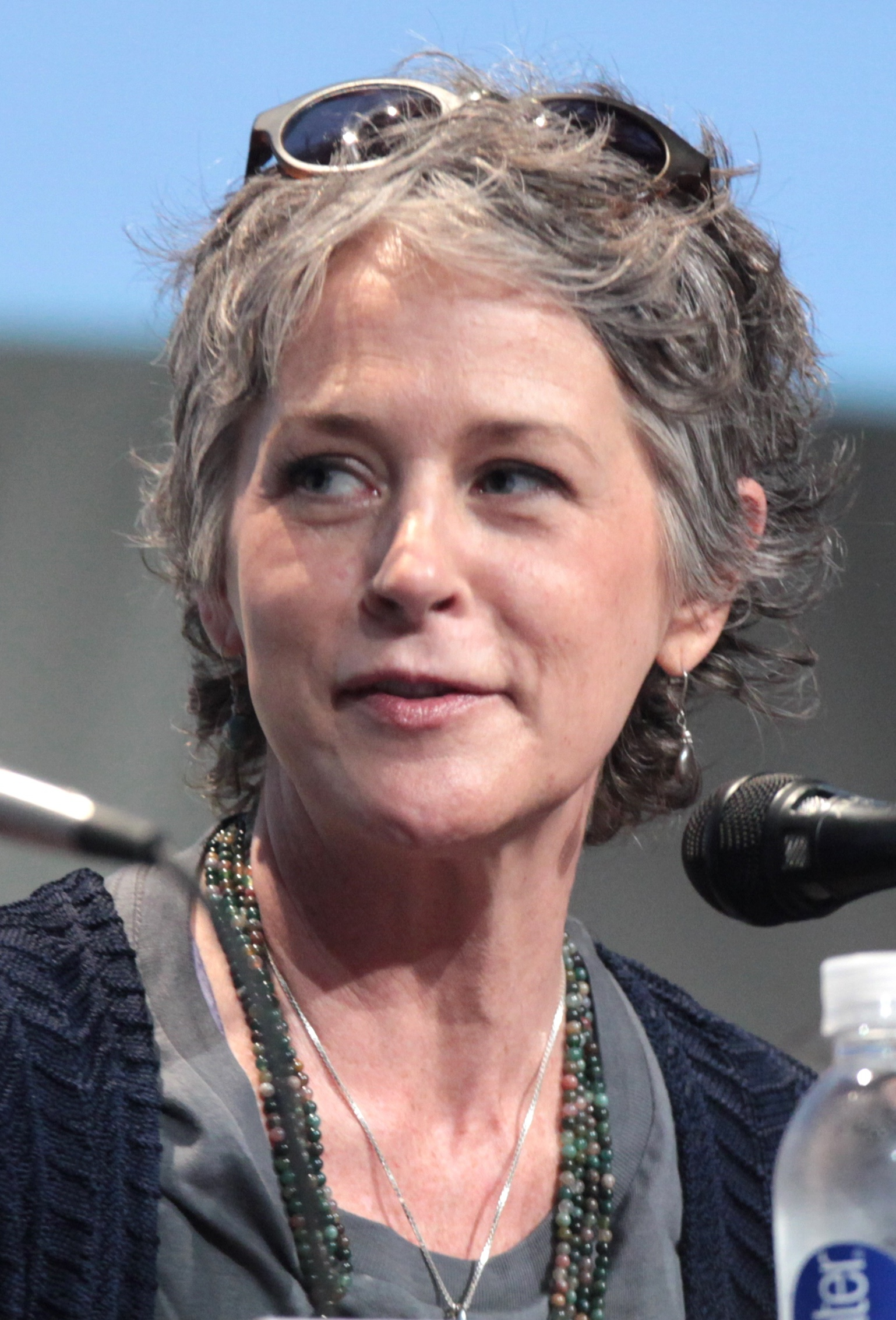
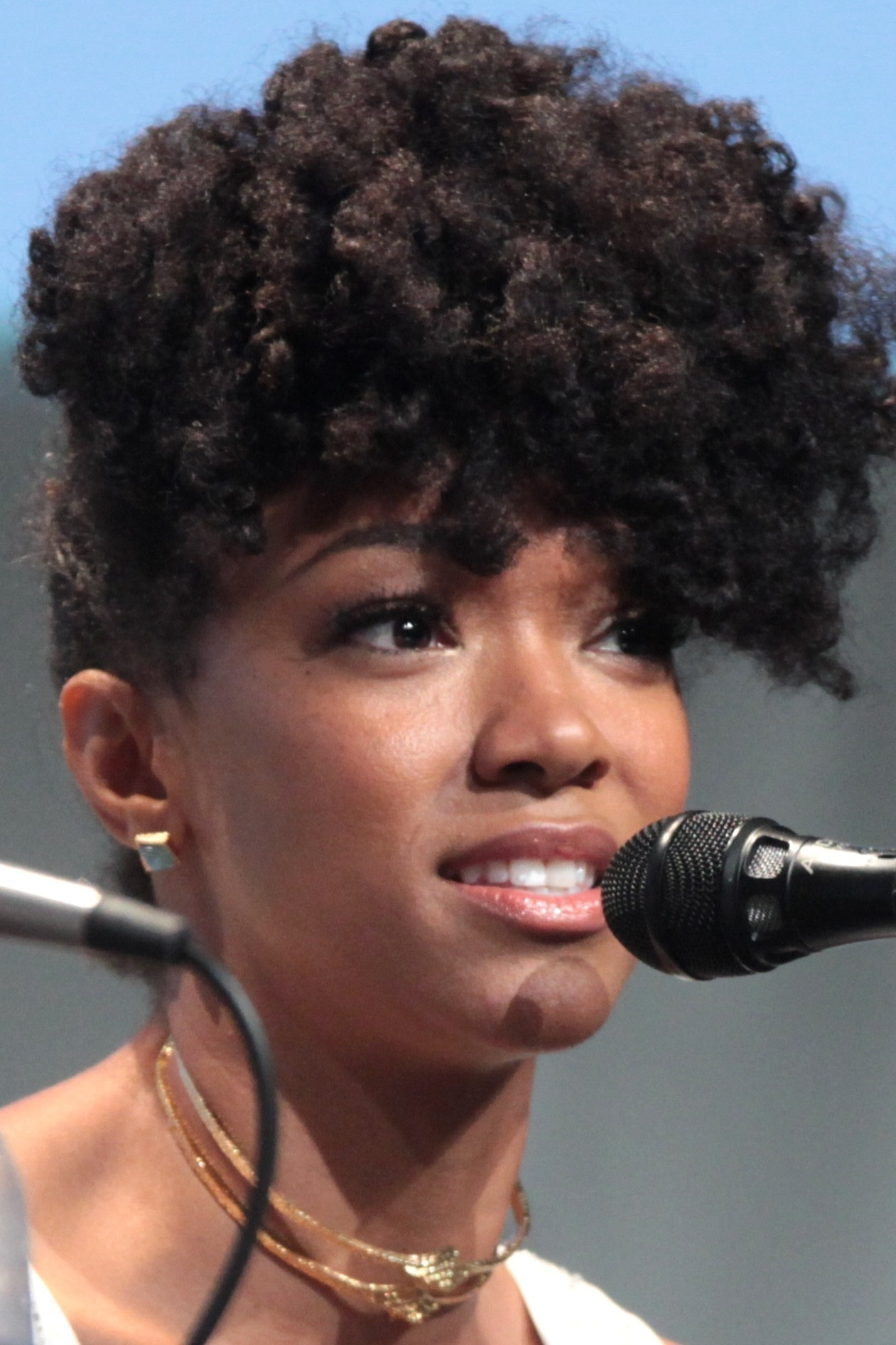
Melissa McBride (left) and Sonequa Martin-Green (right)'s performances were praised, with many highlighting Carol and Sasha's scenes as memorable.

The episode received positive reviews, with most attention going to the storylines involving Carol and Sasha. Matt Fowler of IGN gave "Forget" an 8.6 out of 10, and wrote positively about Carol's intimidation of the young boy, Daryl's storyline with Aaron, and Sasha's actions in the episode. He concluded, "So even though there's no imminent threat at the moment, things within Alexandria are still really intriguing."

Sean McKenna for TV Fanatic spoke positively about the episode, saying he "didn't disagree with Sasha's feelings [towards Alexandria]" and noted Carol's scene with Sam as the highlight of the episode saying: "But man, did Carol take the cake when she went super dark on that kid threatening to feed him to the walkers if he told his mom that she was grabbing the guns. What an intense scene that perhaps, if I hadn’t been watching The Walking Dead up until now, might have thought she was one of the bad guys on the show."

Shane Ryan for Paste Magazine positively reviewed the episode. He compared Sasha to Charles Whitman and felt that she should be kept away from the tower completely and said the scene involving Carol and Sam was "disturbing." In further detail he said: "That scene was so strange and memorable that it’s almost like I’ve been watching a fake Carol all these years, and we just saw her bona fide psychopath interior seep to the surface. Somehow, even killing those sick people at the prison didn’t seem quite so bad—at least there was a twisted logic there."

Tim Surette for TV.com said "Carol, you continue to amaze me and I am really close to asking you to prom."

Writing for The Wall Street Journal, Paul Vigna praised the episode and said it had "wonderful, subtle touches, things to savor, and understated but confident storytelling, from watching the Grimes clan try to fit into a cocktail party to Daryl and Aaron’s bonding through a walker-hunting spree." He also praised Melissa McBride as Carol saying: "What Melissa McBride is doing with Mrs. Peletier, with Carol fooling everybody with this den-mom Junior League act, is simply delicious. The whole thing was a fantastic change of pace." He praised Daryl and Aaron's bond and was sympathetic towards Sasha, calling her situation a "sad story".

Patrick Kevan Day for the Los Angeles Times was complimentary of the episode, and felt that Rick set the table for "screwing the entire place up". He compared the show to the ABC television series, Lost saying: "seeing our band of survivors cleaned up and wearing Saturday-afternoon suburban duds in a halfway civilized setting brought back intense Lost and The Others flashbacks. Perhaps intentional, perhaps coincidental, but it does seem that The Walking Dead writers are enjoying playing with our expectations of the residents of Alexandria." He also considered Sasha's problem to be fixable, and called Rick the "real problem".

Ron Hogan for Den of Geek! felt that Sasha's breakdown at the party of Alexandria served as the episode's highlight. He said: "A few days ago, she was eating beans out of a can; now she's at a dinner party with people eating potato puffs off little plastic swords and drinking beer like there's nothing happening just beyond those corrugated steel walls. But there is. Sasha knows this, and Sonequa Martin-Green plays this perfectly." He went further to say, "I understand what she's going through completely, and her lashing out makes perfect sense, both in ferocity and in timing." He also felt that the direction complimented Martin-Green's performance.

Alan Sepinwall for HitFix was positive towards the episode. He said: "This is some ugly stuff — the Carol/Sam scene was one of the show's most uncomfortable scenes ever that didn't involve a zombie makeup effect — and has breathed a ton of life into the show after that bumpy start to this half-season. Where Hershel's farm and even the prison felt like places where the series overstayed their welcome for budgetary reasons, this new/old world feels rich and complicated enough that I could see a very long and creatively healthy stretch here, as the arrogance of Rick, the paranoia of Carol, the PTSD of Sasha, etc., slowly causes this paradise to crumble around them."
