= Conquer (The Walking Dead) =

- The Walking Dead episode
- Sasha sleeping in a pit filled with dead walkers. This scene earned directorial praise from critics.
- Episode no.: Season 5 Episode 16
- Directed by: Greg Nicotero
- Written by: Scott M. Gimple; Seth Hoffman
- Cinematography by: Michael E. Satrazemis
- Editing by: Julius Ramsay
- Original air date: March 29, 2015
- Running time: 64 minutes

Guest appearances
- Tovah Feldshuh as Deanna Monroe; Lennie James as Morgan Jones; Alexandra Breckenridge as Jessie Anderson; Ross Marquand as Aaron; Austin Nichols as Spencer Monroe; Steve Coulter as Reg Monroe; Benedict Samuel as W Man / Owen; Jason Douglas as Tobin; Jesse Boyd as Edward; Corey Brill as Pete Anderson; Jason Alexander Davis as Red Poncho Man; Ted Huckabee as Bruce; Dahlia Legault as Francine; Mandi Christine Kerr as Barbara; Tiffany Morgan as Erin; Jordan Woods-Robinson as Eric Raleigh; David Marshall Silverman as Kent; Michael Traynor as Nicholas

Episode chronology
← Previous "Try"	Next → "First Time Again"
- The Walking Dead season 5

"Conquer" is the sixteenth and final episode of the fifth season of the post-apocalyptic horror television series The Walking Dead, which aired on AMC on March 29, 2015. It was written by showrunner Scott M. Gimple and Seth Hoffman, and directed by Greg Nicotero.

Several recurring storylines culminate in the episode: the residents of the Alexandria Safe-Zone deciding on what to do with Rick Grimes (Andrew Lincoln) following his outburst in the previous episode; Glenn Rhee's (Steven Yeun) conflict with Nicholas (Michael Traynor); and Sasha Williams (Sonequa Martin-Green) and Father Gabriel Stokes (Seth Gilliam) confronting their demons. Meanwhile, Daryl Dixon (Norman Reedus) and Aaron (Ross Marquand) encounter trouble from a potential threat during a run, and Morgan Jones (Lennie James) nears the end of his search for Rick.

Similar to the pilot episode and the season two premiere, the episode aired in a 90-minute time slot, as opposed to its regular 60-minute time slot.

Television commentators lauded the character progression, its storytelling, Nicotero's direction, Gimple's and Hoffman's script and the ensemble's performances. Many highlighted Andrew Lincoln and Lennie James's performances, as well as the character progression of Carol Peletier. Upon airing, it attracted 15.8 million viewers with an 18-49 rating of 8.2, making it the most watched season finale in the show and drama in basic cable history.

This episode marks the last appearances of the recurring cast Corey Bill (Pete Anderson) and Steve Coulter (Reg Monroe), as their characters die at the end of the episode.

== Plot ==
While surviving in the woods, Morgan is held at gunpoint by Owen (Benedict Samuel), (Note: Credited as "W Man", he is later identified as Owen by showrunner Scott Gimple.) the leader of a group called the Wolves. Owen and another Wolf attack Morgan, but he defeats them both with his staff.

In Alexandria, Rick awakens. He learns that Pete and Jessie have separated, and that Deanna is holding a forum to decide if he will be exiled. Maggie attempts to talk Deanna out of it, but fails. Elsewhere, Daryl and Aaron track a man wearing a red poncho (Jason Alexander Davis). They lose him and trigger a trap that unleashes a horde of walkers, forcing them to take shelter in a car.

Carol threatens Pete after he refuses to allow her to check on Tara. Meanwhile, Glenn sees Nicholas climbing over the wall and follows him into the woods. While tracking him, Glenn is shot by Nicholas. Morgan saves Daryl and Aaron. Aaron invites Morgan to Alexandria, but Morgan declines and asks for directions. On Morgan's map, Daryl recognizes Abraham's note to Rick. Gabriel travels outside the walls and nearly attempts suicide via a walker. He returns to Alexandria and leaves the front gate ajar. Abraham visits Tara, where he reconciles with Eugene. Shortly after, Tara awakens. Rick confesses to Michonne that he and Carol stole the guns, but Michonne brushes it off.

While walking to Deanna's meeting, Rick notices the open gate and finds several walkers inside the houses. In the woods, Glenn nearly kills Nicholas, but spares him after Nicholas begs for his life. Sasha seeks Gabriel for help, but he angrily blames her for Bob and Tyreese's deaths. Sasha holds Gabriel at gunpoint, but Maggie stops Sasha from shooting him. She listens to Gabriel's confession of guilt while helping him to his feet.

The Wolves capture the poncho survivor and kill him. While resetting the trap, they find Aaron's backpack containing evidence of Alexandria's existence.

Deanna reveals Gabriel's claim to the Alexandrians before Rick arrives with a walker corpse. He states that the walls aren't enough to keep them safe. An inebriated Pete, armed with Michonne's katana, kills Reg. Abraham holds him down, and with Deanna's permission, Rick kills Pete. Rick looks up and sees Morgan.

In a post-credits scene, Michonne takes back her katana. At the Wolves' trap, the red poncho survivor, now a walker, stumbles past a car with "WOLVES NOT FAR" written on it.

== Production ==
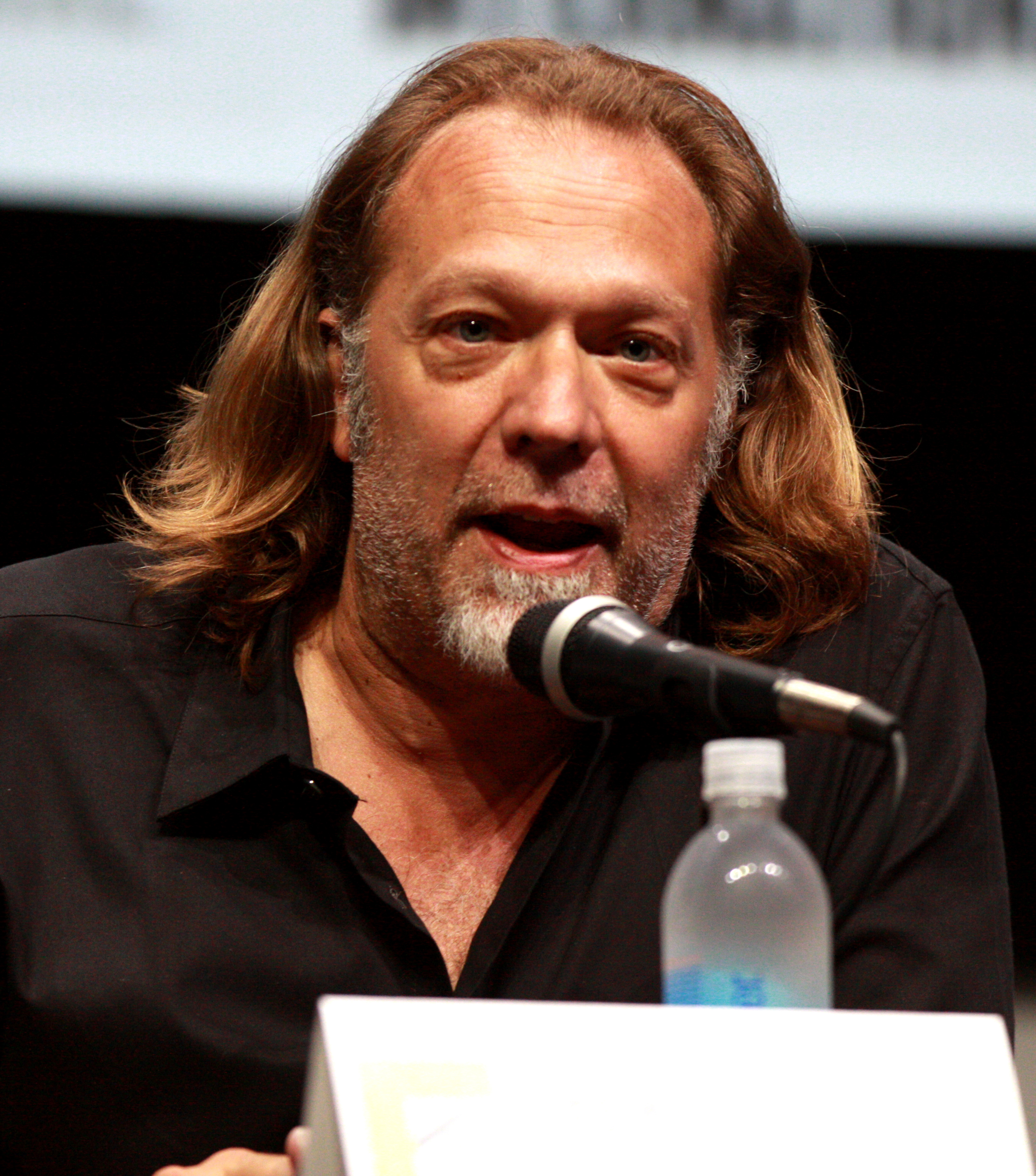
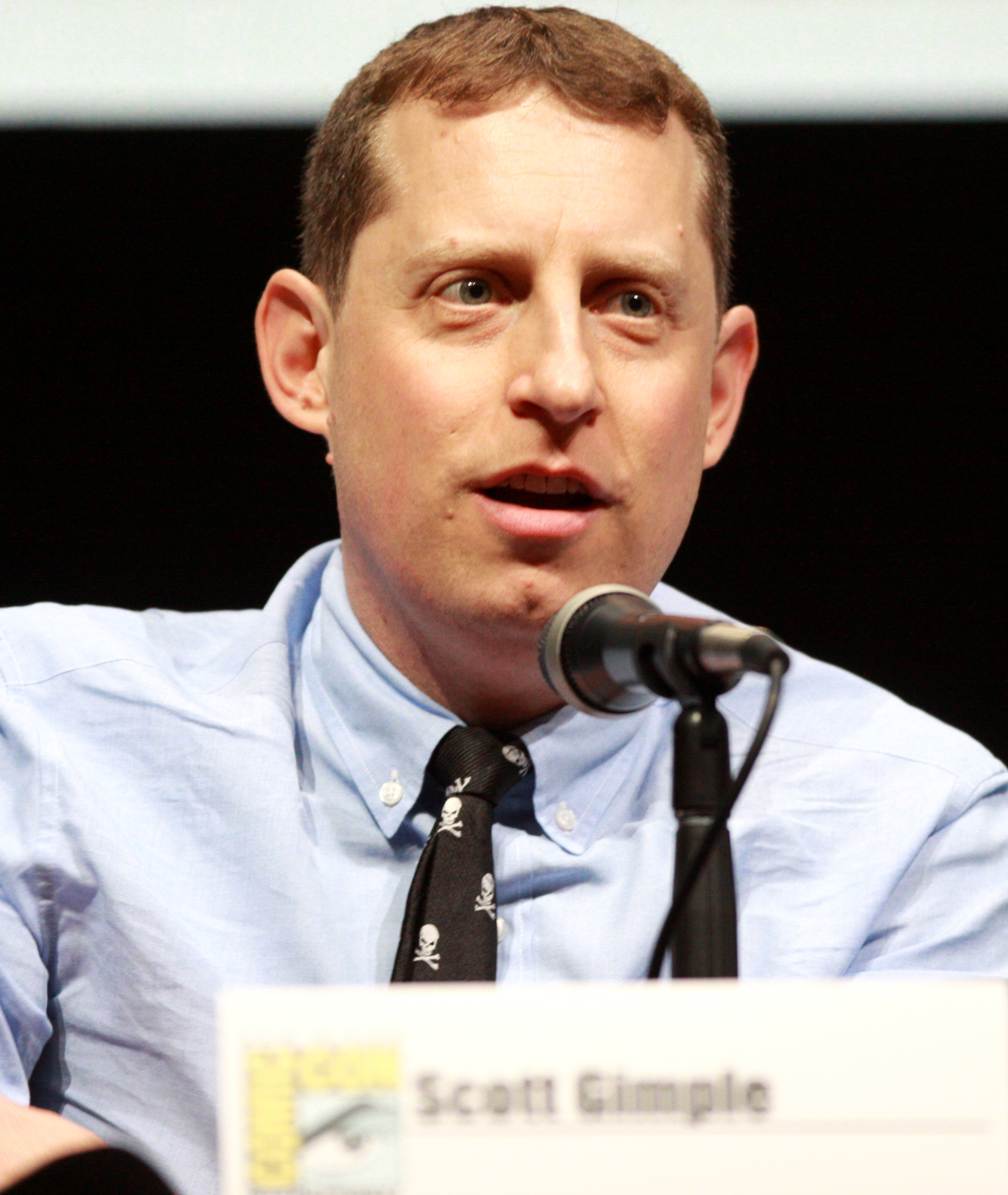
Executive producer Greg Nicotero (left) served as director of "Conquer", which was co-written by series showrunner and executive producer Scott M. Gimple (right).

"Conquer" was co-written by executive producer and series showrunner Scott M. Gimple and co-executive producer Seth Hoffman. It was directed by executive producer and special make-up effects supervisor Greg Nicotero.

The episode featured Lennie James as Morgan Jones prominently, his fifth guest appearance on the television series. It marks his third appearance in the fifth season, after two brief, post-credit cameo appearances in "No Sanctuary" and "Coda", which showed Morgan on the trail after leaving his base in the third season episode "Clear". A cover version of Brian Wilson's 1988 song "Love and Mercy" plays during one scene. It was recorded by Gazelle Twin specifically for the episode.

== Reception ==
=== Ratings ===
Upon airing, the episode was watched by 15.8 million American viewers with an 18-49 rating of 8.2, an increase in viewership from the previous episode which had 13.757 million viewers with an 18-49 rating of 7.0. This made the episode the highest rated season finale in the show's history, beating last season's finale, which had a 7.6 18-49 rating. Including DVR viewership, the episode was watched by 21.43 million viewers with an 18-49 rating of 11.1.

=== Critical reception ===
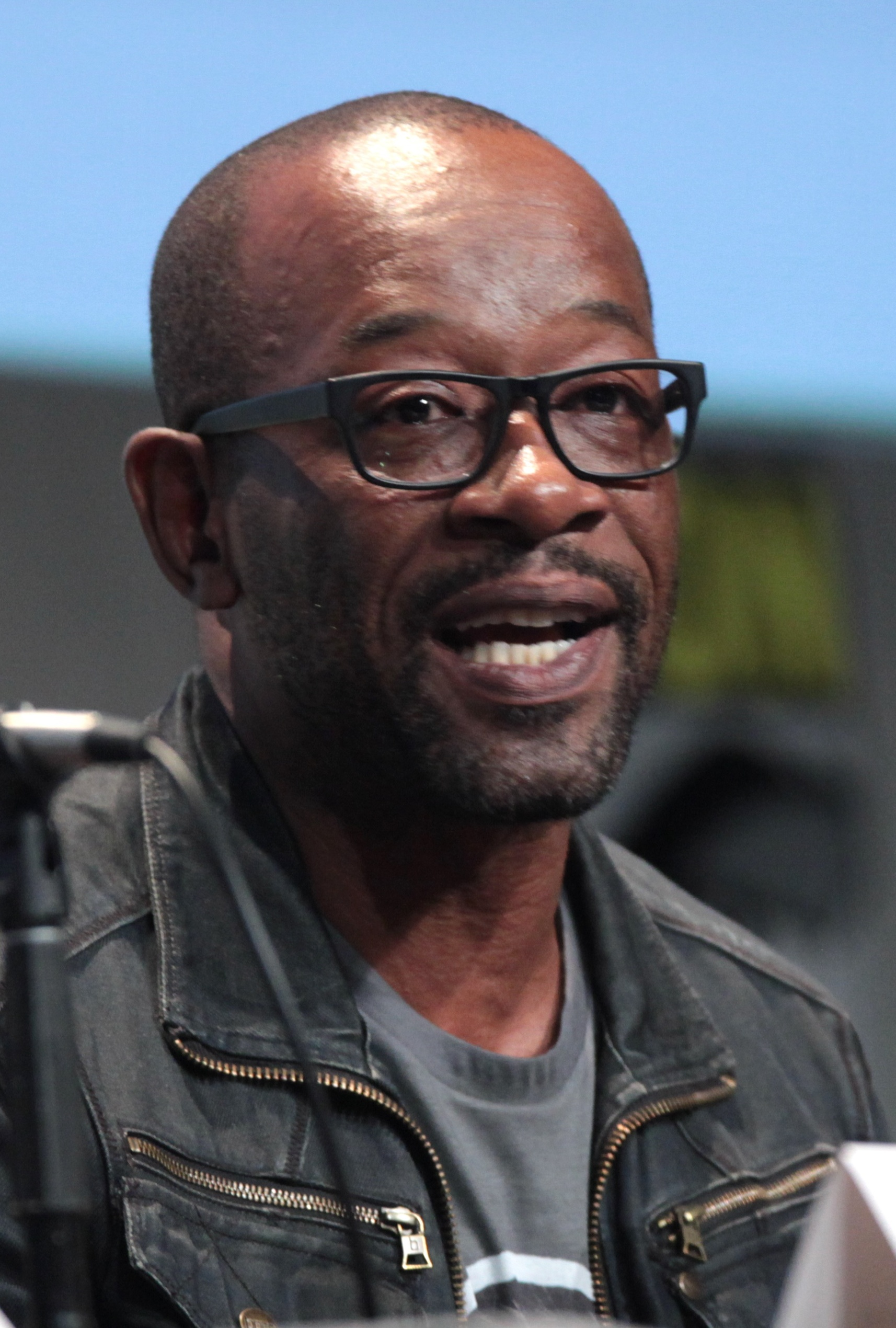
The episode prominently featured Lennie James (pictured) as Morgan Jones in his fifth guest appearance on the television series as well as his integration into the main storyline.

"Conquer" received critical acclaim. Critics praised the reintroduction of Lennie James as Morgan Jones into the main story. Other critics complimented the performances of James, as well as Andrew Lincoln and Tovah Feldshuh as well as the script. The scenes involving Seth Gilliam, Sonequa Martin-Green and Steven Yeun were noted as highlights. Greg Nicotero's direction was praised with many being complimentary of the shot of Sasha lying on a herd of walkers in a graveyard, as well as the scene involving Daryl and Aaron hiding in a car surrounded by hundreds of zombies. Den of Geek!'s Ron Hogan said "Nicotero has been killing it [...] this season, and this brilliantly conceived movie-length episode is a testament to his abilities behind the camera." He also felt the performances of the actors were a strong point in the episode, saying "everyone raises their game" as well as noting the series has "never been better" in its fifth season run.

Some continued to assess the fifth season as the strongest. Variety's Laura Prudom called it "arguably [...] The Walking Dead's best [season] yet, propelled by compulsive story threads and fascinating character dynamics" as she commented on the episode as a whole saying: "The weight of so many competing story arcs certainly brought a breathless quality to the finale — similar to Game of Thrones and that blockbuster show’s sprawling ensemble, each character probably got a cumulative five minutes of screen time while showrunner Scott Gimple worked to tie up multiple loose ends." She also declared that Morgan's presence dominated the episode.

The Guardian's Bryan Moylan declared it "a season finale that had everything." He said: "In bravura style, this shocking season finale showed Rick confronting the people of Alexandria, and perfectly set up a very creepy season six." He praised the ending with "the action [...] cutting between four life-or-death confrontations. Rick was fighting off the three zombies that had been let into Alexandria; Sasha was fending off Gabriel; Glenn was beating the snot out of Nicholas; and Carol, Michonne, and the rest of the group were defending Rick from Deanna." He assessed "And that is what makes this show so great. It resolved all the storylines it had been juggling all season, but not without some moral and emotional ambiguity. And it took the time to direct us towards what we can expect when the show returns. There is resolution, but there is still impending doom. There is never any rest on The Walking Dead, and I can’t wait for its return.

Erik Kain for Forbes praised the episode, inferring it to be unpredictable and "one of the most tense and anxious episodes of The Walking Dead". Both TheWrap and Us Weekly felt the season finale delivered an explosive and action packed climax.
