= Heather Bellson =

Television producer and writer

- Occupations: Television producer Television writer
- Notable work: The Walking Dead; Unforgettable; Black Sails

Heather Bellson is a television producer and writer. She is most recognized for her work on the AMC series The Walking Dead.

== Producer ==
The Walking Dead (as a co-producer)

- 5.01 "No Sanctuary"
- 5.02 "Strangers"
- 5.03 "Four Walls and a Roof"
- 5.04 "Slabtown"
- 5.05 "Self Help"
- 5.06 "Consumed"
- 5.07 "Crossed"
- 5.08 "Coda"
- 5.09 "What Happened and What's Going On"
- 5.10 "Them"
- 5.11 “The Distance”
- 5.12 “Remember”
- 5.13 “Forget”
- 5.14 “Spend”
- 5.15 “Try”
- 5.16 “Conquer”

The Walking Dead (as producer)

- 6.01 “First Time Again”
- 6.02 “JSS”
- 6.03 “Thank You”
- 6.04 “Here's Not Here”
- 6.05 “Now”
- 6.06 “Always Accountable”
- 6.07 “Heads Up”
- 6.08 “Start to Finish”
- 6.09 “No Way Out”
- 6.10 “The Next World”
- 6.11 “Knots Untie”
- 6.12 “Not Tomorrow Yet”
- 6.13 “The Same Boat”
- 6.14 “Twice as Far”
- 6.15 “East”
- 6.16 “Last Day on Earth”

The Exorcist (as supervising producer)

- 1.01
- 1.02
- 1.03
- 1.04
- 1.05
- 1.06
- 1.07
- 1.08
- 1.09
- 1.10

The Exorcist (as co-executive producer)

- 2.01
- 2.02
- 2.03
- 2.04
- 2.05
- 2.06
- 2.07
- 2.08
- 2.09
- 2.10

American Gods (as co-executive producer)

- 2.01
- 2.02
- 2.03
- 2.04
- 2.05
- 2.06
- 2.07
- 2.08
- 2.09
- 2.10

Raised by Wolves (as co-executive producer)

- 1.01
- 1.02
- 1.03
- 1.04
- 1.05
- 1.06
- 1.07
- 1.08
- 1.09
- 1.10

== Writer ==
- The Sandman
  - 1.07 "The Doll's House"
- The Walking Dead
  - 5.05 "Self Help" (co-written with Seth Hoffman)
  - 5.10 "Them"
  - 6.06 "Always Accountable"
  - 10.21 "Diverged"
- Unforgettable
  - 1.07 "Road Block" (co-written with Christal Henry)
  - 1.17 "Blind Alleys" (co-written with Erik Oleson)
- Black Sails
  - 1.06 "VI."
  - 2.01 “IX.”
  - 2.02 “X.”
  - 2.03 “XI.”
  - 2.04 “XII.”
  - 2.05 “XIII.”
  - 2.06 “XIV.”
  - 2.07 “XV.”
  - 2.08 “XVI.”
  - 2.09 “XVII.”
  - 2.10 “XVIII.”
- The Exorcist
  - 1.02 “Chapter Two: Lupus in Fabula”
  - 2.01 “Janus”
  - 2.08 “A Heaven of Hell”
- American Gods
  - 2.03 “Munnin”
  - 2.15 “Treasure of the Sun”
- Raised by Wolves
  - 1.05 "Infected Memory"
- Daredevil: Born Again
  - 1.09 "Straight to Hell"
  - 2.03
  - 2.07
