= The Walking Dead season 6 =

The Walking Dead
- Season 6
- Promotional poster for the mid-season premiere
- Showrunner: Scott M. Gimple
- Starring: Andrew Lincoln; Norman Reedus; Steven Yeun; Lauren Cohan; Chandler Riggs; Danai Gurira; Melissa McBride; Michael Cudlitz; Lennie James; Sonequa Martin-Green; Josh McDermitt; Christian Serratos; Alanna Masterson; Seth Gilliam; Alexandra Breckenridge; Ross Marquand; Austin Nichols; Tovah Feldshuh
- No. of episodes: 16

Release
- Original network: AMC
- Original release: October 11, 2015 – April 3, 2016

Season chronology
- ← Previous; Season 5 Next → Season 7

The sixth season of The Walking Dead, an American post-apocalyptic horror television series on AMC, premiered on October 11, 2015, and concluded on April 3, 2016, consisting of 16 episodes. Developed for television by Frank Darabont, the series is based on the eponymous series of comic books by Robert Kirkman, Tony Moore, and Charlie Adlard. The executive producers are Kirkman, David Alpert, Scott M. Gimple, Greg Nicotero, Tom Luse, and Gale Anne Hurd, with Gimple as showrunner for the third consecutive season. The sixth season received positive reviews by critics. It was nominated for multiple awards and won three, including Best Horror Television Series, at the 42nd Saturn Awards.

This season adapts material from issues #78–100 of the comic book series and introduces notable comic characters, including Heath (Corey Hawkins), Dr. Denise Cloyd (Merritt Wever), Dwight (Austin Amelio), Paul "Jesus" Rovia (Tom Payne), Gregory (Xander Berkeley) and Negan (Jeffrey Dean Morgan). Following Pete's death, the season continues the story of Rick Grimes (Andrew Lincoln) and his group of survivors, who must take a step back from the violence they've come to embrace, as multiple threats lead them to adopt a mindset of hardness.

The first half of the season focuses on the group, still having trouble assimilating in the Alexandria Safe-Zone, leading the community through a series of crises, including luring the threat of a massive herd of walkers away from a nearby quarry, an attack by dangerous scavengers known as the Wolves and the invasion of a gargantuan swarm of walkers inside Alexandria. The second half of the season focuses on the group's discovery of a new survivor community—The Hilltop—who they become allies with, and their becoming adversaries of a vast organization of hostile survivors known as the Saviors.

== Cast ==
The primary characters of the sixth season include (from left to right): Abraham, Eugene, Rosita, Tara, Carl, Michonne, Carol, Sasha, Maggie, Glenn, Daryl, Rick, Morgan, Gabriel, Deanna, Aaron, Jessie, and Spencer

=== Main cast ===
The sixth season features eighteen series regulars overall, with ten actors receiving opening credits billing, while eight others are credited as "Also starring". Sonequa Martin-Green and Lennie James were added in the opening sequence after previously being credited as "Also starring" in previous seasons. Steven Yeun, who plays Glenn Rhee, was removed from the opening credits after "Thank You" and returns in "Heads Up". Alexandra Breckenridge, Ross Marquand, Austin Nichols and Tovah Feldshuh are credited as "Also starring" after being promoted from recurring status.

==== Starring ====
- Andrew Lincoln as Rick Grimes, the series' protagonist, who struggles to balance his brutality and his humanity, and create a stable life for his two children.
- Norman Reedus as Daryl Dixon, the group's primary hunter and a recruiter for Alexandria.
- Steven Yeun as Glenn Rhee, Maggie's courageous and supportive husband, and one of the original members of the group, known for his resourcefulness and strategic mind.
- Lauren Cohan as Maggie Greene, Glenn's strong-willed and determined wife, who is now the last surviving member of her family after the deaths of her father, Hershel, and sister, Beth.
- Chandler Riggs as Carl Grimes, Rick's teenage son, who struggles with growing up in a post-apocalyptic world.
- Danai Gurira as Michonne, a fearless, katana-wielding warrior, who lost her family.
- Melissa McBride as Carol Peletier, a survivor of domestic abuse, who, following her daughter's death, becomes an empowered, ruthlessly pragmatic survivor.
- Michael Cudlitz as Sgt. Abraham Ford, a former military sergeant and boyfriend of Rosita, who has some interest in Sasha.
- Lennie James as Morgan Jones, the first survivor Rick encountered in season one, who has finally come to peace with the world around him.
- Sonequa Martin-Green as Sasha Williams, a former firefighter, who suffered from PTSD after the loss of her brother, Tyreese, and boyfriend, Bob.

==== Also starring ====
- Josh McDermitt as Eugene Porter, a survivor rescued by Abraham and posed as a scientist, who could cure the walker virus.
- Christian Serratos as Rosita Espinosa, a pragmatic optimist, who is protective of those around her and girlfriend of Abraham.
- Alanna Masterson as Tara Chambler, a former ally of The Governor and the only surviving member of her family.
- Seth Gilliam as Gabriel Stokes, a priest, who lived alone in his church at the beginning of the outbreak and now seeks to redeem himself for his actions in the previous season.
- Alexandra Breckenridge as Jessie Anderson, an Alexandria resident, who spent years living with an abusive husband, Pete.
- Ross Marquand as Aaron, an Alexandrian recruiter, who brought Rick's group to Alexandria.
- Austin Nichols as Spencer Monroe, Deanna's only living son and a guard of Alexandria.
- Tovah Feldshuh as Deanna Monroe, a former Congresswoman and the leader of Alexandria, who recently lost her husband and her son, and turns to Rick to help guide the community.

=== Supporting cast ===
==== Alexandria Safe-Zone ====
- Merritt Wever as Dr. Denise Cloyd, a doctor stationed in Alexandria and Tara's love interest.
- Corey Hawkins as Heath, a supply runner in Alexandria.
- Jason Douglas as Tobin, the foreman of Alexandria's construction crew.
- Austin Abrams as Ron Anderson, Jessie's oldest son, who resents Rick for the execution of his abusive father.
- Major Dodson as Sam Anderson, Jessie's younger son, who forms an attachment with Carol.
- Katelyn Nacon as Enid, a teenager, who recently moved to Alexandria after surviving outside in the apocalypse for several months after her parents died and has formed a bond with Carl.
- Ann Mahoney as Olivia, an Alexandria resident, who is in charge of the community's food and armory.
- Kenric Green as Scott, a supply runner in Alexandria.
- Beth Keener as Annie, a supply runner in Alexandria.
- Justin Miles as Barnes, a hot-headed survivor from Alexandria who does not trust Rick.
- Ted Huckabee as Bruce, a member of Alexandria's construction crew.
- Jay Huguley as David, a resident of Alexandria, who volunteers for Rick's walker diversion plan.
- Dahlia Legault as Francine, a member of Alexandria's construction crew.
- Michael Traynor as Nicholas, originally a conniving, arrogant, and cowardly Alexandrian resident, who later tries to redeem himself for his past actions.
- Jordan Woods-Robinson as Eric Raleigh, Aaron's boyfriend and his former recruiting partner.
- Ethan Embry as Carter, a resident of Alexandria, who questions Rick's judgement.
- Mandi Christine Kerr as Barbara, resident of Alexandria.
- Susie Spear Purcell as Shelly Neudermeyer, a resident of Alexandria obsessed with acquiring a pasta machine.
- Tiffany Morgan as Erin, a resident of Alexandria and friend of Carol.

==== The Hilltop ====
- Tom Payne as Paul "Jesus" Rovia, a member and scout for the Hilltop.
- Xander Berkeley as Gregory, the arrogant leader of the Hilltop.
- R. Keith Harris as Dr. Harlan Carson, a doctor at the Hilltop.
- James Chen as Kal, a guard of the Hilltop.
- Peter Zimmerman as Eduardo, a guard of the Hilltop.
- Karen Ceesay as Bertie, a resident of the Hilltop.
- Jeremy Palko as Andy, a resident at the Hilltop.
- Brett Gentile as Freddie, a resident of the Hilltop.
- Kimberly Leemans as Crystal, a resident at the Hilltop.
- Justin Kucsulain as Ethan, a resident at the Hilltop, whose brother was captured by Negan.

==== The Saviors ====
- Jeffrey Dean Morgan as Negan, the mysterious leader of a group called the Saviors that he rules in tyranny and the unseen primary antagonist of the second half of the season.
- Steven Ogg as Simon, a member of the Saviors and Negan's right-hand .
- Austin Amelio as Dwight, a member of the Saviors, who kidnaps Daryl and forms a violent hostile rivalry with him. He is initially known as "D" to Daryl.
- Christine Evangelista as Sherry, a former babysitter and Dwight's wife.
- Liz E. Morgan as Tina, Sherry's diabetic sister.
- Matt Lowe as Cam, a member of the Saviors searching for Dwight, Sherry, and Tina.
- Alicia Witt as Paula, a member of Negan's group, lieutenant for the Saviors. A formerly submissive woman, who lost her family and became an unrepentant killer, she is a counterpart to Carol.
- Jeananne Goossen as Michelle, a member of Paula's group and counterpart to Maggie.
- Jill Jane Clements as Molly, an elderly member of Paula's group.
- Rus Blackwell as Donnie, an abusive member of Paula's group.
- Jimmy Gonzales as Primo, a Savior captured by Rick's group.
- Christopher Berry as a lieutenant member of a motorcycle gang of the Saviors. While the character is not specifically named, Berry personally named him Bud.
- Rich Ceraulo as Jiro, a member of Roman's group and lieutenant savior patrol.
- Stuart Greer as Roman, a Savior, who hunts Carol.

==== Miscellaneous ====
- Benedict Samuel as the unnamed leader of the Wolves and the primary antagonist of the first half of the season. Showrunner Scott M. Gimple said that "Owen" is one of possible names for the character.
- Jesse C. Boyd as Nick, the second-in-command of the Wolves.
- John Carroll Lynch as Eastman, a survivor, who rehabilitates Morgan and teaches him aikido.
- Daniel Newman as Daniel, one of Ezekiel's top soldiers, maintains a brief and hostile encounter with Rick.

== Production ==
On October 7, 2014, AMC renewed The Walking Dead for a sixth season. Scott M. Gimple said that the sixth season would continue to remix material from the comic and explained that there would be a flashback backstory to some of the characters:

"There are other people that we're going to see throughout the season from the comics, and I'm excited for people to see it, but I don't want to tell them now. I think a few minor remixes, but some direct stuff from the comic as well, as far as these characters go.

I think there's a really cool aspect to the first half of the season that serves almost as a prequel to some direct comic stuff in the second half of the season. I think there's a way that Robert did some of the story that we're reaching that had a real past to it, where people are referring to some things in the past in the comic. And we're able to portray some of that backstory in some ways that you didn't get to see in the comic."

=== Filming ===
Filming for the season began in Senoia, Georgia, in early May 2015 and concluded on November 17, 2015. The season contains three extended episodes, airing in expanded 90-minute time slots, the season premiere, the fourth episode and the season finale.

=== Casting ===
Three new actors were cast to portray new characters in the sixth season, including Corey Hawkins as Heath, a prominent and long running comic book character who is a supply runner and loyal friend to Glenn Rhee. Merritt Wever joined the cast in the role of comic book character Dr. Denise Cloyd, while Ethan Embry also joined the cast. In September 2015, Xander Berkeley was announced in an unknown recurring role that would debut during the second half of the season, and Berkeley has an option for series regular for the seventh season. In January 2016, Berkeley's role was confirmed to be Gregory, a character from the comics. Tom Payne joins the cast as Hilltop recruiter, Paul Monroe. On November 10, 2015, it was announced that Jeffrey Dean Morgan had been cast as Negan.

Alanna Masterson who portrays Tara Chambler took maternity leave from the season in the episode "Not Tomorrow Yet" as she was nine months pregnant during the time of filming the episode. She is absent from the final four episodes, and it is explained through her character going on a two-week supply run.

== Episodes ==
No. overall	No. in season	Title	Directed by	Written by	Original release date	U.S. viewers (millions)
68	1	"First Time Again"	Greg Nicotero	Scott M. Gimple & Matthew Negrete	October 11, 2015	14.63
Following the deadly town meeting, Rick and Morgan discover a herd of thousands of walkers stuck in a nearby quarry. Rick pushes forward a plan to lure the walkers away from the community before they become a greater threat. Rick's brutal domination of the Alexandrians leads one to contemplate killing him while Morgan provokes him to question his conscience. Ultimately, the plan falls apart when a horn blares near Alexandria, attracting half the herd from the orderly "parade."
69	2	"JSS"	Jennifer Lynch	Seth Hoffman	October 18, 2015	12.18
Alexandria is invaded by the Wolves, who brutally slaughter people in the streets. Spencer opens fire on a truck approaching the wall, killing the driver and inadvertently activating the truck's horn. Morgan saves people while Carol fights her way to the armory and distributes guns to survivors. Carl tries to shelter Ron and Enid, but Ron refuses his protection and Enid flees Alexandria. As the Alexandrians begin fighting back, Morgan is attacked by a member of the Wolves he had previously met on the road and convinces him and his pack to retreat.
70	3	"Thank You"	Michael Slovis	Angela Kang	October 25, 2015	13.14
Glenn and Michonne race to lead a group ahead of a herd which has changed course for Alexandria. The herd catches up to them, and only Michonne, Heath and Scott make it back to the community. Failing to distract the herd, Glenn and Nicholas are surrounded by walkers, leading Nicholas to panic and kill himself. Rick circles around for an RV hoping to draw the herd back on the planned route, but he is attacked by the Wolves that Morgan dismissed from Alexandria. Rick kills them, but the shot-up RV won't start as the walker herd begins surrounding it.
71	4	"Here's Not Here"	Stephen Williams	Scott M. Gimple	November 1, 2015	13.34
In flashbacks, Morgan is living in the woods after burning down his apartment in a fit of insanity. He stumbles upon a secluded cabin and shoots at its sole inhabitant, psychiatrist Eastman, who knocks Morgan out and puts him in a cell. The two gradually bond as Eastman teaches Morgan aikido and a philosophy that all life is precious. After Eastman is bitten by a walker, Morgan kills him before he can turn, leaves and discovers a sign that leads to Terminus. In the present, Morgan tells his story to a Wolf he had secretly taken prisoner, in hopes of inspiring him to change his ways.
72	5	"Now"	Avi Youabian	Corey Reed	November 8, 2015	12.44
Rick returns to Alexandria barely ahead of the walker herd. With walkers now surrounding the community and the town ravaged by the Wolves' attack, morale among the Alexandrians begins to drop. While searching for Glenn, Maggie tells Aaron that she is pregnant. Denise is quickly losing her confidence in her abilities as a doctor, but Tara encourages her to continue trying. After Rick saves Deanna from a walker, she suggests he is more fit to lead Alexandria.
73	6	"Always Accountable"	Jeffrey F. January	Heather Bellson	November 15, 2015	12.87
While helping lead the walker herd away from Alexandria, Daryl is separated from Sasha and Abraham when they're ambushed by a group of strangers. Daryl is captured by a trio of survivors, who suspect he is one of the assailants. Daryl tries to recruit his captors, but they steal his crossbow and motorcycle before fleeing. Abraham and Sasha reunite with Daryl; they begin to head back to Alexandria in a fuel truck.
74	7	"Heads Up"	David Boyd	Channing Powell	November 22, 2015	13.22
After hiding from the walker herd, Glenn encounters Enid and convinces her to accompany him back to Alexandria. Ron sneaks into the armoury and steals ammunition. Carol confronts Morgan, suspecting that he is holding a prisoner. Glenn and Enid release several balloons, leading Maggie to realize Glenn is alive. However, at that moment, the damaged clock tower collapses, opening a breach in Alexandria's wall.
75	8	"Start to Finish"	Michael E. Satrazemis	Matthew Negrete	November 29, 2015	13.98
With the wall breached, walkers invade Alexandria. Rick, Michonne, Carl, Gabriel, and Deanna take refuge in Jessie's house; they discover Deanna has been bitten. Carol takes shelter in Morgan's house and discovers Denise treating the captured Wolf. Carol attempts to kill the Wolf, but Morgan stops her, only to be immediately knocked out by the Wolf, who takes Denise hostage and escapes. Succumbing to infection, Deanna stages a last stand as Rick's group disguises themselves as walkers and maneuvers through the walker horde. In a post-credits scene, Daryl, Abraham and Sasha are confronted by the Saviors, who tell them that all of their possessions now belong to Negan.
76	9	"No Way Out"	Greg Nicotero	Seth Hoffman	February 14, 2016	13.74
After eliminating the Saviors patrol, Abraham, Sasha, and Daryl continue toward Alexandria. While saving Denise from walkers, the Wolf is shot by Carol and killed by walkers. Sam and Jessie are killed by walkers while moving through the herd. In response, Ron tries to shoot Rick, but is killed by Michonne; Carl is shot in the eye as the handgun discharges. Rick inspires others to make a desperate stand against the herd; they are about to be overwhelmed when the walkers are diverted by burning fuel brought by Daryl, Sasha and Abraham.
77	10	"The Next World"	Kari Skogland	Angela Kang & Corey Reed	February 21, 2016	13.48
Some two months after battling the walkers in Alexandria, Rick and Daryl head out for a supply run and encounter a smooth-talking man known as Jesus, who steals their truck; they bring him back to Alexandria after a tussle. Meanwhile, Michonne follows Spencer into the woods and aids him in dispatching and burying the walker that once was his mother, Deanna.
78	11	"Knots Untie"	Michael E. Satrazemis	Matthew Negrete & Channing Powell	February 28, 2016	12.79
Rick's group travels to The Hilltop with Jesus to trade and alleviate Alexandria's food shortage. Talks are interrupted when a Hilltop resident attempts to assassinate Hilltop's leader, Gregory, on Negan's orders. Jesus explains that Negan's people have been extorting food, medicine and supplies from the Hilltop under the threat of an attack. Maggie makes a deal with Gregory to kill Negan, take out the Saviors, and return a Hilltop hostage in exchange for half of their supplies.
79	12	"Not Tomorrow Yet"	Greg Nicotero	Seth Hoffman	March 6, 2016	12.82
Rick campaigns for a pre-emptive attack to kill the Saviors, leaving Carol haunted by the lives she has taken. Using a ruse to kill the guards at the compound, they secure the Hilltop hostage, Craig, and proceed to methodically murder several Saviors before an alarm is triggered. Jesus and Tara send Andy back to the Hilltop with Craig to honor their deal, while Carol prevents Maggie from joining the fight. The next morning, Tara and Heath depart on a supply run. A lone surviving Savior named Primo tries to escape; while Daryl beats him, a woman's voice comes over a walkie-talkie, claiming that they have Maggie and Carol.
80	13	"The Same Boat"	Billy Gierhart	Angela Kang	March 13, 2016	12.53
Carol and Maggie are captured by Paula, Michelle, Molly and Donnie, who observe Primo taken hostage by Rick's group. Feeling themselves at a disadvantage, they withdraw to a slaughterhouse to interrogate Carol and Maggie while awaiting reinforcements. When unguarded, Carol and Maggie free themselves and kill their four captors; they dispatch the reinforcements who arrive just ahead of their group. Rick kills Primo when he claims to be Negan.
81	14	"Twice as Far"	Alrick Riley	Matthew Negrete	March 20, 2016	12.69
Abraham and Eugene go on a patrol and find a facility where Eugene can craft ammunition; Abraham leaves after Eugene claims he no longer requires Abraham's protection. Daryl, Rosita, and Denise travel to an apothecary to scavenge medicines. Denise is killed by Dwight and the Saviors, who ambush Daryl and Rosita while holding Eugene hostage. A gun battle ensues, and Eugene is injured before Dwight retreats with the surviving members of his group. Carol sneaks out of Alexandria, leaving a note for Tobin expressing her wishes not to be pursued.
82	15	"East"	Michael E. Satrazemis	Story by : Scott M. Gimple & Channing Powell; Teleplay by : Channing Powell	March 27, 2016	12.38
While Alexandria is locked down against the Savior threat, Carol is caught by a group of Saviors who want to use her to get into the community. She kills most of them, but one, Roman, survives and pursues her on foot. Rick and Morgan follow a blood trail they believe is Carol's, until Morgan sends Rick back due to his murderous reaction toward a non-hostile survivor. Aided by Glenn, Michonne and Rosita, Daryl hunts Dwight to avenge Denise, but the four of them are captured in the woods by Dwight and the Saviors.
83	16	"Last Day on Earth"	Greg Nicotero	Scott M. Gimple & Matthew Negrete	April 3, 2016	14.19
Roman finds Carol and shoots her twice, but is killed by Morgan before he can finish her off; two strangers find Carol and Morgan and offer to take them to their community for refuge. Rick's group try to get Maggie to Hilltop for medical attention, but find all of the routes blocked by the Saviors. Although Eugene volunteers to distract the Saviors while the rest of the group gets Maggie to Hilltop on foot, everyone is captured. Negan, who was not Primo, arrives and coerces the group's loyalty. As punishment for their actions, he bludgeons an unseen member of Rick's group to death with his barbed-wire laced baseball bat "Lucille".

== Reception ==
=== Critical response ===
The sixth season of The Walking Dead has received positive reviews from critics. On Metacritic, the season holds a score of 79 out of 100, indicating "generally favorable" reviews, based on 10 critics. On Rotten Tomatoes, the season holds a 76% with an average rating of 7.4 out of 10 based on 512 reviews. The site's critical consensus reads: "Six seasons in, The Walking Dead is still finding ways to top itself, despite slow patches that do little to advance the plot." Matt Fowler for IGN gave a 6.8/10 rating for the season as a whole. In summary, he said: "Walking Dead's Season 6 had some big, effective moments while also crumbling under an avalanche of fake outs & trickery." He praised the Morgan flashback episode ("Here's Not Here") and Carol's arc and the "string of great, violent episodes in the [second half of the season]." His major criticisms of the season were "Glenn's 'death' - and other cheap fake outs/unnecessary cliffhangers" and "characters clumsily steered into making dumb choices."

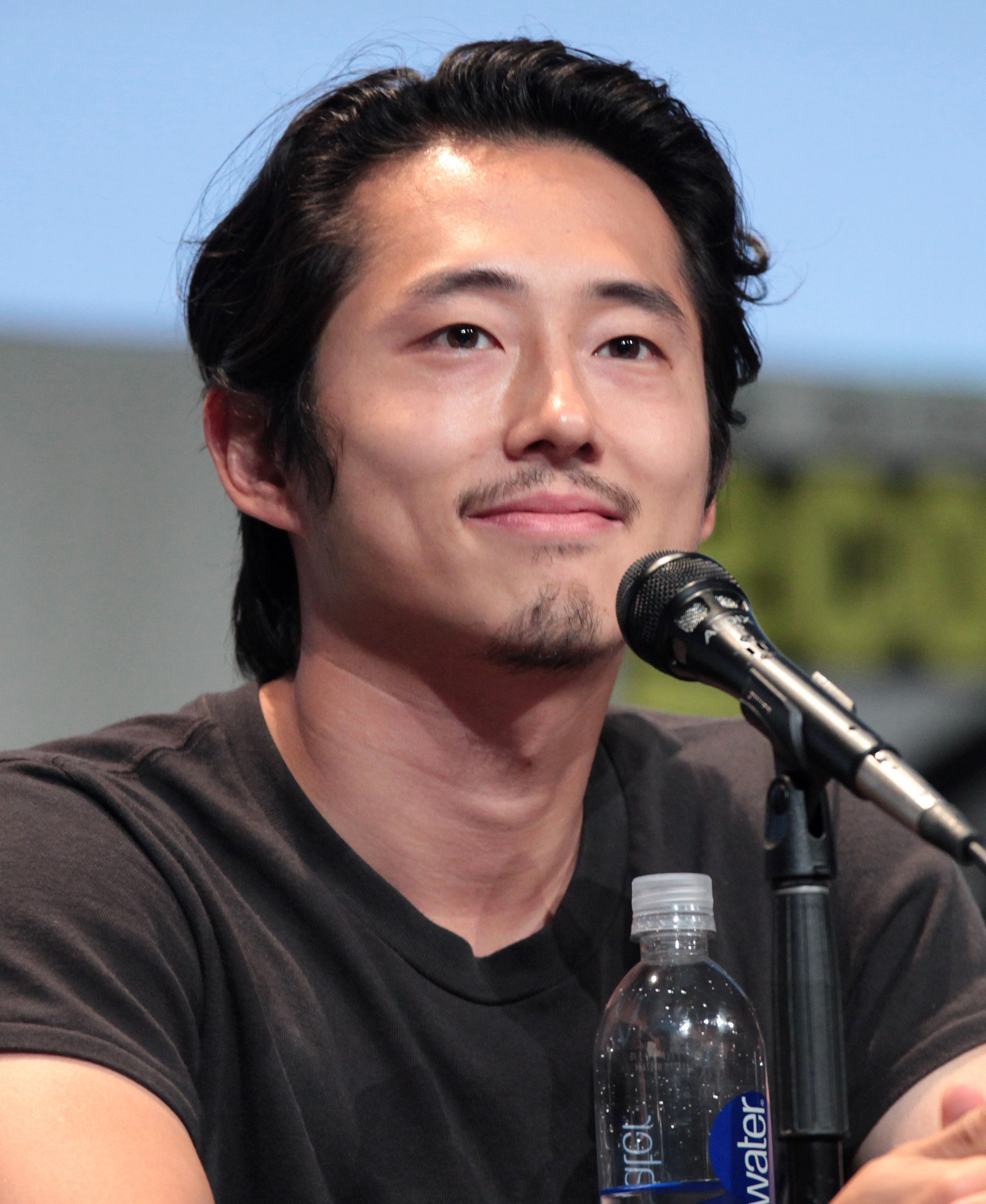
The storyline surrounding Steven Yeun's character, Glenn, was a source of criticism.

Glenn's fake death in the third episode, "Thank You", was a major source of controversy. The Hollywood Reporter heavily criticized the decision of the writers to create the story line. Daniel Fienberg felt apathetic about the decision and said, "I'm not sure I care about [...] the way his death would impact the ensemble. If he's dead, the loss will be felt most by Maggie, but Maggie just had her sister die a few episodes ago, so there's no variation anymore to making Lauren Cohan wail, no matter how entirely convincingly she does it. To me, The Walking Dead has lost whatever core of human relationships it ever had, and whether Glenn lives or dies, it just feels mechanical now." Tim Goodman expressed shock over the concept of Glenn potentially being alive saying, "I honestly don't think showrunner Scott M. Gimple is dumb enough to fake this death somehow, not with how implausible it would be for Glenn to survive it." The Hollywood Reporter later declared that the show had "lost its credibility" when Glenn was revealed to be alive in the seventh episode, "Heads Up." Scott Gimple responded to the controversy surrounding this. He said, "We've had instances of people in a very emotional state — Tyreese jumping into the middle of a large herd and fighting his way out; a man cut off his own hand and fights his way through a department store full of walkers. These things are part of the world. Glenn had the bad luck of being knocked off that dumpster by Nicholas, ending his own life but [Glenn] had the good luck of Nicholas landing on him. There's a lot of very specific facts about it that I think a lot of people have sort of gotten wrong. But breaking it down shot for shot … I think we're past that point. I don't think this is any sort of new instance that broke the rules of our show at all. I think it's very much in line with everything we've done before. I don't think there's a credibility issue." Erik Kain for Forbes felt that the decision ruined Glenn's storyline. He declared season 6 "a mixed bag" and was frustrated with the decision to hold off Glenn's fate for 3 episodes. He said, "...the showrunners spent three more episodes essentially refusing to move the plot forward. We got one good backstory, and then two episodes where almost nothing happened to anyone we cared about. We learned that Maggie was pregnant and that's about all." When speaking of the confirmation of Glenn being alive, Kain felt the decision was "implausible" from the inconsistency of his fall and camera angle tricks. He also felt the decision to "[drag] it out for weeks" had "effectively [killed] off all the tension [...] at the end of episode 3." Brian Moylan of The Guardian was also critical, saying: "Glenn is alive, and The Walking Dead will never be the same.... It would rather kill off a main character than pull a lame switcheroo. Until now."

While the first half of the season received heavy criticism, many of the episodes in the second half were critically acclaimed. The episode "No Way Out," which resolved all previous cliffhangers, was widely acclaimed. "The Next World" received highly positive reviews for its lighter tone and the romance between protagonist Rick Grimes and Michonne by fans and critics alike, notably The Guardian and The A.V. Club. Subsequent episodes received praise, notably the episode "Not Tomorrow Yet". "The Same Boat" was lauded for its "strong female focus." Jeremy Egner of The New York Times commented positively on Carol's character development. He adulated the complexity of Carol's division between ruse and real emotion, saying "Like always, Carol did whatever necessary to survive and protect her cohorts, and did so in particularly brutal fashion [...] but she seems increasingly unable to avoid reckoning with the toll. "Are you O.K.?" Daryl asked when he arrived. "No," she responded, and that was before Rick executed the remaining Savior right in front of her. It's going to take more than a few Hail Marys to make that image, among many others, go away."

The finale, "Last Day on Earth", received largely mixed to negative reviews, with many criticizing the cliffhanger. It sparked backlash on social media from fans and critics alike. While Jeffrey Dean Morgan's performance as Negan was praised, the episode was mostly criticized for its cliffhanger ending. On Rotten Tomatoes, it holds a 42% with an average rating of 6.60 out of 10, based on 33 reviews. The episode's critical consensus reads, "Despite Jeffrey Dean Morgan's deliciously evil turn as Negan, the meandering "Last Day on Earth"—and its manipulative cliffhanger ending—make for a disappointing season finale." Zack Handlen of The A.V. Club gave the episode a C, the lowest grade given by the site for the show to date, and commented, "The problem is almost everything else. We'll get to Negan and that so-idiotic-it's-actually-kind-of-hilarious cliffhanger in a second, but before we do, let's unpack the many ways 'Last Day On Earth' went wrong. Even the title is bad—not on its own." Emily VanDerWerff of Vox gave the episode a negative review, calling it the worst episode of the show so far, and commenting, "The extra-long episode spent its first hour dramatizing all the excitement of your GPS insisting that you take a road you already know is closed, and the last half-hour sank some nicely spooky moments with a too-long monologue and a completely botched cliffhanger." However, she gave a positive review on Negan's introduction.

The Walking Dead season 6: Critical reception by episode
Season 6 (2015–16): Percentage of positive critics' reviews tracked by the website Rotten Tomatoes

=== Accolades ===
For the 42nd Saturn Awards, the sixth season of The Walking Dead received seven nominations and three wins. The wins were for Best Horror Television Series, Best Supporting Actress on Television (Danai Gurira), and Best Performance by a Younger Actor in a Television Series (Chandler Riggs). The nominations were for Best Actor on Television (Andrew Lincoln), Best Supporting Actress on Television (Tovah Feldshuh and Melissa McBride), and Best Guest Starring Role on Television (John Carroll Lynch).

The season also received two Primetime Emmy Award nominations for the 68th Primetime Creative Arts Emmy Awards, which were for Outstanding Prosthetic Make-up for a Series, Limited Series, Movie, or Special and Outstanding Special Visual Effects in a Supporting Role (both for "No Way Out"). Additionally, the season was also nominated for Outstanding Performance by a Stunt Ensemble in a Television Series at the 22nd and 23rd Screen Actors Guild Awards for both halves of the season, respectively. For his portrayal of Negan, Jeffrey Dean Morgan earned himself a nomination and win for Best Guest Performer in a Drama Series at the 7th Critics' Choice Television Awards for his appearance in the season six finale, in addition to the first half of season seven.

=== Ratings ===
The Walking Dead's sixth-season premiere ("First Time Again") received 14.63 million viewers in its initial broadcast on AMC in the United States. The viewership slightly declined from the previous season's record-breaking premiere ("No Sanctuary") and the fourth-season premiere ("30 Days Without an Accident"), but was the most watched television series of the night. The season finale ("Last Day on Earth") received a 6.9 rating in the key 18-49 demographic with 14.19 million total viewers and was a significant increase from the previous episode ("East"), which received a 5.9 rating and 12.38 million total. This was also significantly lower than the ratings for the fifth-season finale ("Conquer"), which was watched by 15.78 million American viewers with an 18-49 rating of 8.2.

Viewership and ratings per episode of The Walking Dead season 6
No.	Title	Air date	Rating (18–49)	Viewers (millions)	DVR (18–49)	DVR viewers (millions)	Total (18–49)	Total viewers (millions)
1	"First Time Again"	October 11, 2015	7.4	14.63	2.7	4.87	10.1	19.50^{1}
2	"JSS"	October 18, 2015	6.2	12.18	2.5	4.90	8.7	17.08^{1}
3	"Thank You"	October 25, 2015	6.7	13.14	2.8	5.06	9.5	18.20^{1}
4	"Here's Not Here"	November 1, 2015	6.8	13.34	2.7	4.83	9.5	18.17^{1}
5	"Now"	November 8, 2015	6.2	12.44	2.6	4.67	8.8	17.11^{1}
6	"Always Accountable"	November 15, 2015	6.5	12.87	2.2	4.15	8.7	17.02^{1}
7	"Heads Up"	November 22, 2015	6.7	13.22	—N/a	—N/a	—N/a	—N/a
8	"Start to Finish"	November 29, 2015	7.0	13.98	2.3	4.30	9.3	18.28^{1}
9	"No Way Out"	February 14, 2016	6.8	13.74	3.2	6.25	10.0	19.99
10	"The Next World"	February 21, 2016	6.6	13.48	2.6	4.94	9.2	18.42^{1}
11	"Knots Untie"	February 28, 2016	6.1	12.79	2.6	4.96	8.7	17.76^{1}
12	"Not Tomorrow Yet"	March 6, 2016	6.1	12.82	3.2	5.78	9.3	18.60
13	"The Same Boat"	March 13, 2016	6.0	12.53	2.6	5.04	8.6	17.57
14	"Twice as Far"	March 20, 2016	6.0	12.69	3.1	5.70	9.1	18.38
15	"East"	March 27, 2016	5.8	12.38	2.4	4.53	8.2	16.91^{1}
16	"Last Day on Earth"	April 3, 2016	6.9	14.19	2.7	5.17	9.6	19.36

^1 Live +7 ratings were not available, so Live +3 ratings have been used instead.

== Home media release ==
The sixth season was released on DVD and Blu-ray on August 23, 2016.
