= Heads Up (The Walking Dead) =

- The Walking Dead episode
- Rosita berates Eugene over the loss that will come to him if he doesn't learn how to fight.
- Episode no.: Season 6 Episode 7
- Directed by: David Boyd
- Written by: Channing Powell
- Cinematography by: Stephen Campbell
- Editing by: Avi Youabian
- Original air date: November 22, 2015
- Running time: 43 minutes

Guest appearances
- Merritt Wever as Dr. Denise Cloyd; Jason Douglas as Tobin; Kenric Green as Scott; Ann Mahoney as Olivia; Austin Abrams as Ron Anderson; Major Dodson as Sam Anderson; Jay Huguley as David; Landon Ali as Cute Walker; Mandi Christine Kerr as Barbara; Katelyn Nacon as Enid; David Marshall Silverman as Kent; Michael Traynor as Nicholas

Episode chronology
← Previous "Always Accountable"	Next → "Start to Finish"
- The Walking Dead season 6

"Heads Up" is the seventh episode of the sixth season of the post-apocalyptic horror television series The Walking Dead, which aired on AMC on November 22, 2015. The episode was written by Channing Powell and directed by David Boyd.

This episode reveals the unresolved fate of Glenn Rhee after the episode "Thank You" and builds tension for the mid-season finale "Start to Finish." It adapts the rope-climbing scene from "Volume 14, "Issue #81" of the comic book series.

== Plot ==
After being knocked off the garbage dumpster by Nicholas' corpse, Glenn crawls under the dumpster to evade the walkers that surrounded it. Time passes, the walkers disperse, and Enid finds Glenn. In a nearby store, she explains that she fled Alexandria when the Wolves attacked it, and before Glenn can learn more, she runs off.

In Alexandria, Morgan is forced to tell Rick, Michonne, and Carol that he let the captured Wolves escape. Morgan justifies his actions by reminding Rick that he previously spared Morgan's life, and that while he wanted to kill the Wolves before, he believes people can change. Rosita gives knife lessons to a group including Eugene, while elsewhere Carl provides handgun lessons to Ron, but refuses to allow Ron to use live ammunition. Ron sneaks into the armory to obtain cartridges for the gun.

Glenn discovers the body of David and his note to Betsy, and decides to chase after Enid. He catches up to her in a restaurant, and although Enid holds him at gunpoint, Glenn convinces her to accompany him back to Alexandria. En route, they find some balloons that they use to distract walkers to keep the way clear.

Rick assesses the damage from the Wolves' attack, and finds a section of wall where blood is dribbling from, and starts working to re-enforce it, aware his hammering is luring more walkers to the walls. Tobin joins Rick to help with the repairs, admitting to Rick that their group brought many changes to Alexandria but the remainder of them are adapting and thankful for their help.

Spencer attempts to climb over the Alexandria walls to lead some walkers away, but ends up falling. Tara helps to dispatch walkers while Rick, Tobin, and Morgan pull Spencer back inside Alexandria. Spencer explains his actions as trying to follow what Rick had wanted to do earlier, but had excluded any of the Alexandrians from helping.

Later, Morgan discreetly meets with Denise, acting as Alexandria's doctor, and tells her he needs her help to treat an injured person. Morgan leads Denise to the lone Wolf he secured in a townhouse, but Carol witnesses this, follows them inside, and demands to see who he captured.

In the distance, the townspeople spot balloons rising above the walls, and Maggie realizes it is a sign from Glenn. Just then, the old church tower, which had been deteriorating for a long time, topples onto the wall segment that Rick and Tobin were trying to reinforce, destroying it.

== Production ==
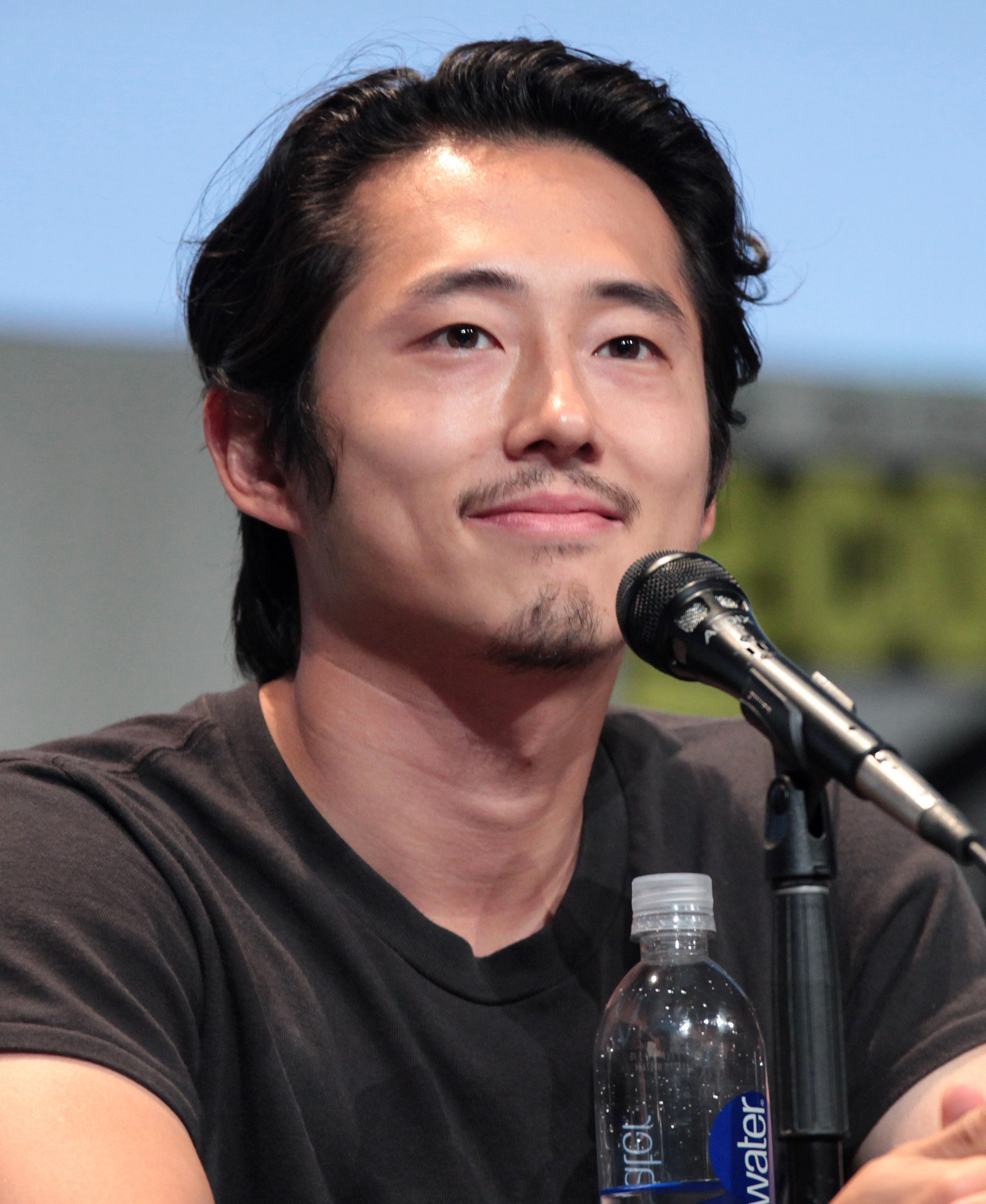
This episode marks the return of Steven Yeun (Glenn Rhee) after a temporary absence.

With this episode, Steven Yeun, who plays Glenn, is added back into the opening credits. His name had been removed for the previous three episodes after "Thank You" had left his status unknown.

== Reception ==
=== Critical reception ===
The episode received mixed reviews from critics. As of 2015, it holds a 52% rating with an average score of 7.2 out of 10 on the review aggregator Rotten Tomatoes. The critics' consensus reads: "With "Heads Up," The Walking Dead offers the resolution to a major cliffhanger, but with frustrating results."

Matt Fowler of IGN gave it a 7.0 out of 10 and wrote in his verdict: "The best parts of "Heads Up" were definitely the beginning - which finally cleared up the whole Glenn debate/debacle - and the very end when the building came crashing down, breaking the town's big barrier. Everything else was just there to lead us up to bigger things. Bigger developments. Better stories. This one contained a lot of recycled themes, including Rick still considering everyone outside of his group (with Deanna as the exception, and Gabriel as the reverse exception) as the equivalent of "Redshirts" on Star Trek."

Zack Handlen of The A.V. Club gave it a B and wrote, "'Head's [sic] Up' opens and closes with a bang, the former metaphorical, the latter implied. In between those two dramatic explosions, there's a lot of talking."

Brian Moylan of The Guardian gave it a less favorable review, saying: "Glenn is alive, and The Walking Dead will never be the same.... It would rather kill off a main character than pull a lame switcheroo. Until now."

=== Ratings ===
The episode averaged a 6.7 rating in adults 18–49 and 13.22 million viewers overall, a rise from the previous episode, which averaged a 6.5 rating in adults 18–49 and 12.87 million viewers overall.
