= First Time Again =

- The Walking Dead episode
- In the opening scene, many Alexandria citizens, led by Rick and his group, orchestrate Rick's plan at the quarry.
- Episode no.: Season 6 Episode 1
- Directed by: Greg Nicotero
- Written by: Scott M. Gimple; Matthew Negrete
- Cinematography by: Michael E. Satrazemis
- Editing by: Dan Liu
- Original air date: October 11, 2015
- Running time: 65 minutes

Guest appearances
- Ethan Embry as Carter; Corey Hawkins as Heath; Jason Douglas as Tobin; Austin Abrams as Ron Anderson; Major Dodson as Sam Anderson; Kenric Green as Scott; Ted Huckabee as Bruce; Jay Huguley as David; Beth Keener as Annie; Jonathan Kleitman as Sturgess; Dahlia Legault as Francine; Ann Mahoney as Olivia; Justin Miles as Barnes; Katelyn Nacon as Enid; Michael Traynor as Nicholas; Jordan Woods-Robinson as Eric Raleigh

Episode chronology
← Previous "Conquer"	Next → "JSS"
- The Walking Dead season 6

"First Time Again" is the sixth season premiere of the post-apocalyptic horror television series The Walking Dead, which aired on AMC on October 11, 2015. The episode was written by Scott M. Gimple and Matthew Negrete, and directed by Greg Nicotero. The episode aired in an expanded 90-minute time slot.

Still having trouble assimilating into the Alexandria Safe-Zone, Rick Grimes (Andrew Lincoln) and his group come up with a plan to lure a gargantuan herd of walkers away from a quarry near Alexandria. In the midst of this new threat, flashbacks show the events following Pete's execution, including Rick's new leadership role and reunion with Morgan Jones (Lennie James).

This episode features many recurring guest stars, including Alexandria newcomers from the comic book series, such as Heath (Corey Hawkins), Scott (Kenric Green), and Carter (Ethan Embry); the latter is an amalgamation of several comic book characters.

== Plot ==
Rick and a group of Alexandrians stand at the top of a granite quarry filled with thousands of walkers. During Rick's speech outlining his plan to lure the walkers out of the quarry and away from the Alexandria Safe-Zone, a rock collapses beneath one of the trucks that had been blocking an exit, freeing the walkers. Rick is forced to immediately execute his plan, a day ahead of schedule, while the Alexandrians who haven't been told the details flee for their lives. Flare guns and Daryl's noisy motorcycle are used to lure the walkers out in a parade, turning them west and up a valley.

Black and white flashbacks present select events following the town council meeting where Reg and Pete were killed: Deanna berates Gabriel for turning her against Rick's group; Pete's oldest son Ron becomes alienated from his mother, Jessie; Glenn brings Nicholas in for medical treatment, concealing his actions; Tara awakens; Morgan and Rick reunite.

In the morning, Heath (Corey Hawkins) returns from a two-week supply run with his team of Scott (Kenric Green) and Annie (Beth Keener). Morgan tells Rick about the "Wolves", and encounter Gabriel and Tobin burying Pete and Reg's corpses. Rick stops them from burying Pete, saying the killer should not be buried within the walls, while the grieving Deanna tells them to discard Pete's corpse in a lonely woods. There, Morgan provokes Rick to question his conscience, and the duo discover the quarry where they deposit walkers accidentally attracted by Pete's oldest son Ron, who had followed them. Rick realizes that the quarry serves as a walker trap that had helped keep Alexandria safe, but it now represents a serious threat with thousands of walkers behind barricades, which will eventually fail. In Ron's presence, Rick changes his mind and begins to dig a grave for Pete instead of dumping his body like trash.

Back in Alexandria, Rick warns the community about the threat of the herd in the quarry. Grieving, Deanna has mentally checked out and effectively cedes authority to Rick, who voices his intention to free the walkers from the quarry and lure them 20 miles away from Alexandria. Rick's group present a strong and united front against protests from the Alexandrians, though Carter (Ethan Embry) is brave enough to raise valid objections at the risks in executing Rick's plan. Later, when an unarmed construction team is building a wall intended to turn the herd, Rick unexpectedly holds back his armed people and allows walkers to close in on some Alexandrians, in an effort to teach them to defend themselves with their tools at hand. Shocked, the construction team panic and falter, and Rick's people defy his orders to save the Alexandrians' lives. Carter is outraged and secretly meets with Spencer, Tobin, Francine, and Olivia in the armory, and proposes to assassinate Rick before he kills someone else. Eugene is caught overhearing the proposed plot and Carter contemplates killing Eugene but is stopped by Rick, who arrives in force with Daryl and Morgan. Rick reduces Carter to his knees and holds him at gunpoint, thoroughly dominating the Alexandrian, but eventually decides to spare him after hearing his pathetic pleas.

In the present, Daryl, Abraham and Sasha act as bait to lure the escaped walkers away from Alexandria. Abraham shows signs of PTSD over Rick's slaying of Pete while Abraham was restraining him. Glenn leads Nicholas and Heath to kill walkers trapped in a store along the route, whose noise might otherwise distract the herd. However, Glenn is concerned about Nicholas being ready, but Nicholas does more than his part.

Meanwhile, Rick has lines of people in the woods on either side of the road and tells them they need to watch the walkers like "cops at a parade" to ensure walkers do not stray off. Carter runs to the front, thoroughly submissive and trusting his life to Rick's plan rather than his own judgement, but is grabbed and bitten on the right cheek by a stray walker unexpectedly trapped amongst the trees. He begins screaming out of sheer pain and visceral fear and by doing so attracts more walkers, so Rick has the group fire guns to redirect them back to the course. Rick locates and kills the attacking walker, and stabs Carter through the back of his head to stop him from screaming, and to relieve him of his suffering.

The parade of walkers are nearing the green marker where Rick believes they will continue on course without further intervention; however, a distant horn starts blaring. The rear half of the parade turn toward the noise and break into a loose herd as they filter through the woods. Rick and Michonne immediately realize the sound is coming from Alexandria, and that Rick's plan has no contingency for this.

== Production ==
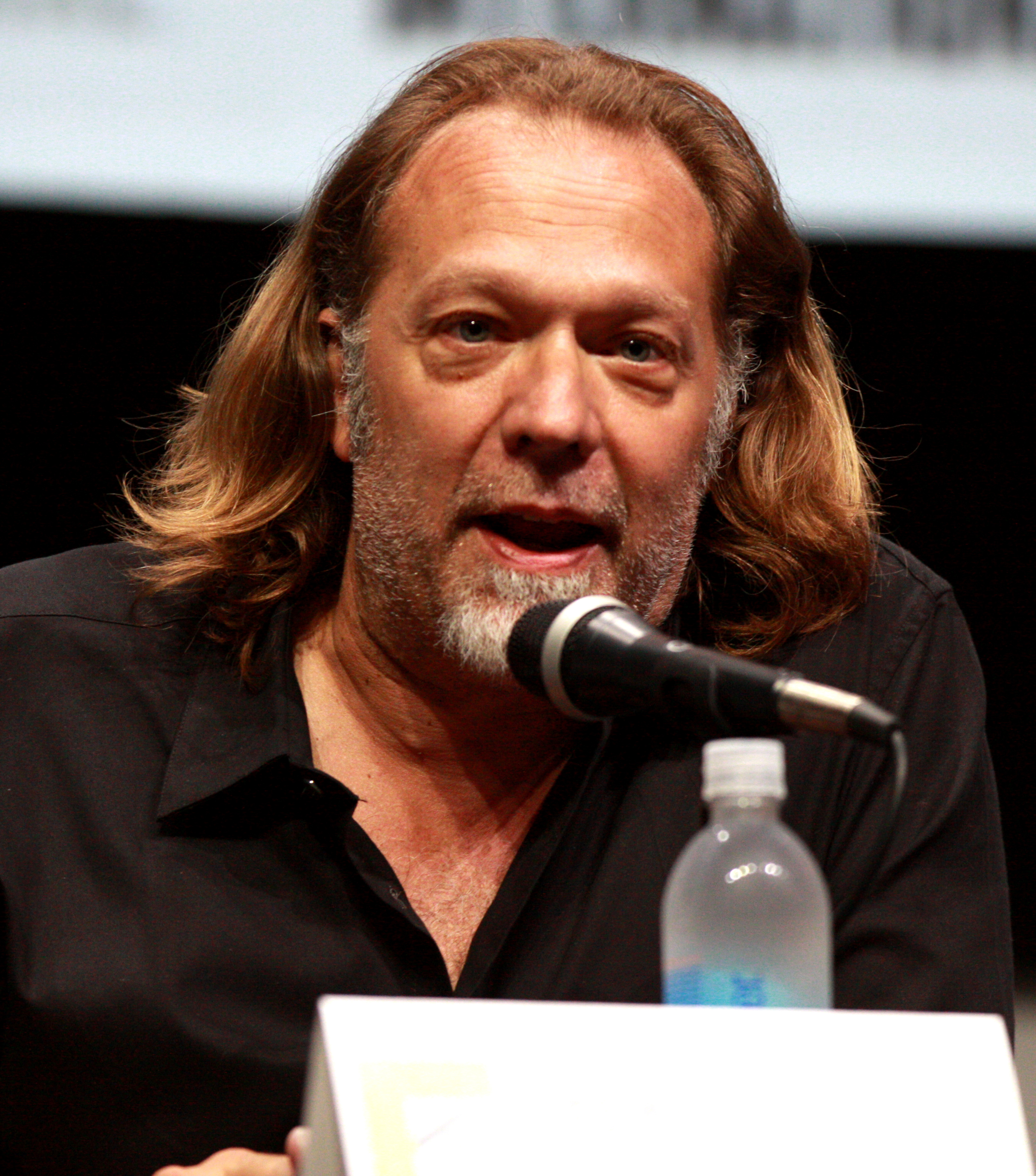
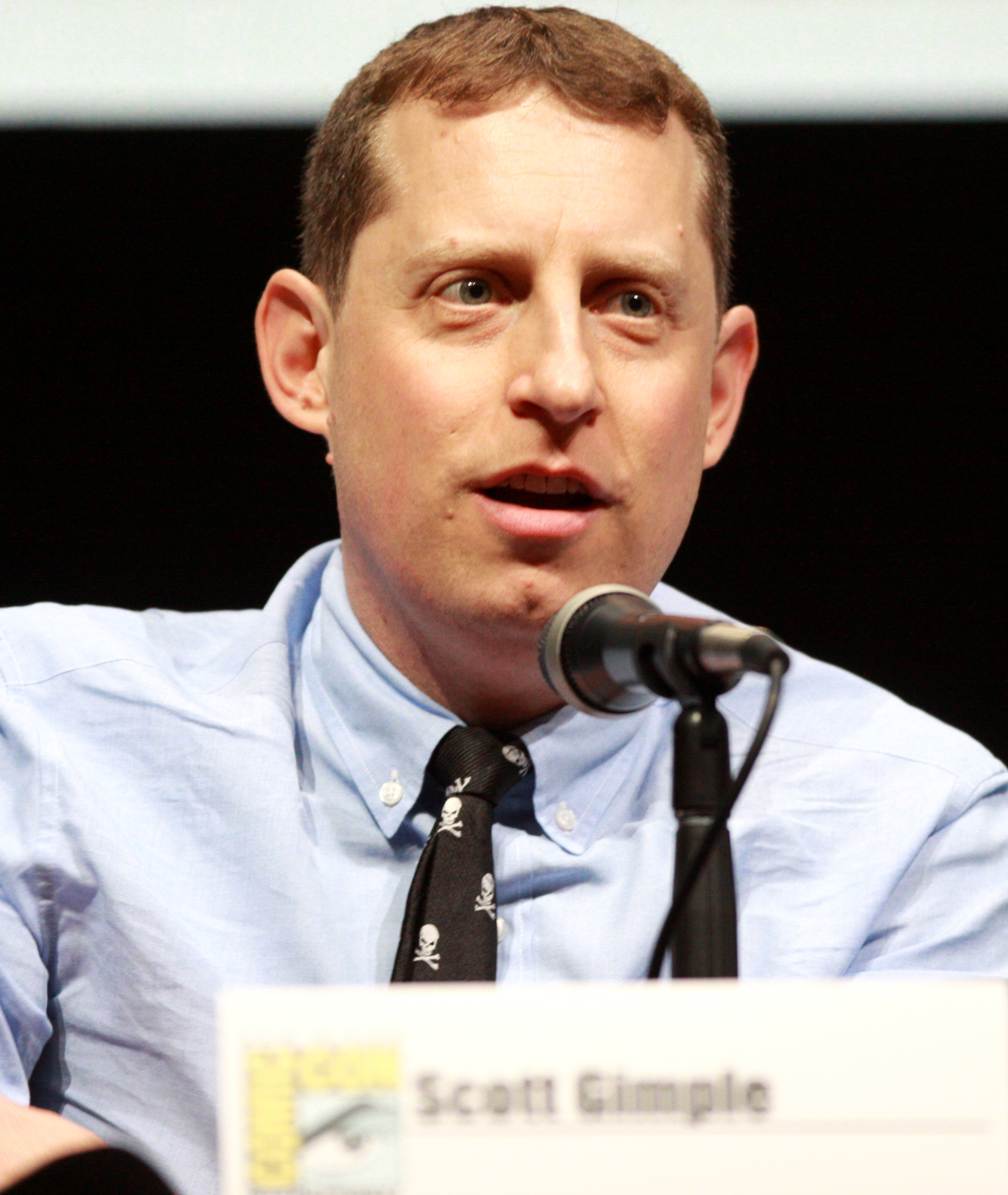
Executive producer Greg Nicotero (left) served as director of "First Time Again", which was co-written by series showrunner and executive producer Scott M. Gimple (right) as well as Matthew Negrete.

"First Time Again" was co-written by executive producer and series showrunner Scott M. Gimple, and supervising producer Matthew Negrete. It was directed by executive producer and special make-up effects supervisor Greg Nicotero, who directed four episodes for season six.

The episode features the first appearance of Lennie James as a series regular; James reprises his role as Morgan Jones from previous appearances in seasons one, three, and five. Series creator Robert Kirkman described Morgan as "very different (and cooler) than his comics counterpart" and expressed excitement over James' involvement in the season, writing: "Having Lennie, who was such a huge part of season 1 and amazing every time we had him back, finally a regular part of this show is really going to energize this show for the coming season. And I would argue this show wasn't really in need of re-energizing, so it's just going to be that much better." The episode also marked the first episode which features Tovah Feldshuh, Alexandra Breckenridge, Ross Marquand, and Austin Nichols as part of the main cast; they reprise their roles as Deanna Monroe, Jessie Anderson, Aaron, and Spencer Monroe, respectively, from the fifth season.

Following the promotions, new Alexandria characters have been announced, who were off-screen during season five. During casting, fake names, occupations, and scenes were temporarily assigned to limit the leaking of spoilers. Corey Hawkins joins the cast as supply runner Heath, a prominent and long-running comic book character who is a loyal friend of Glenn Rhee. During the casting call, Heath was referred to as "Delvin", a "cynic [who] is left so dumbfounded by displays of stupidity that it's nearly impossible for him to admit that he thinks, down deep, people are – or at least can be – decent. Even if they're idiots." Ethan Embry also joins the cast as an original character, Carter, whose character during the casting call was called "Tucker", a "hard-working man" who "values fairness" and is an "amalgamation" of several characters from the comic. Kenric Green, whose wife Sonequa Martin-Green plays Sasha Williams on the show, also joins the series as the comic character Scott, who is Heath's supply run partner and friend.

Speaking with Tech Insider, Nicotero explained the artistic choice of using black and white for the flashback scenes, saying: "We took sort of a rather bold move because we wanted to play with our non-linear timeline. We wanted to sort of make sure it wasn't confusing for the audience, so we had initially explored the idea of doing a desaturated flashback versus an oversaturated present-day. The present-day oversaturated makes the trees look very green and the zombies look very beautiful and 'Wizard of Oz'. It's so pretty, and you're like, 'Wow, that's sort of weird.' Adding color to zombies is not something that you immediately gravitate to. So we went with the idea of just taking all the color out instead of just desaturating the flashback ... just so you could easily follow the timeline. The episode's a puzzle and what we're doing is we're giving you the final piece of the puzzle at the beginning and we love the idea that as the episode progresses, the audience is putting the pieces together, so by the time we get to the end of the episode, it's like, 'Ohhhhh, now I get what we're looking at and now I see how this is all working. I think the discussion had come up once or twice about recutting it, but I felt that it would have taken away a lot of impact of the story to just tell it in a linear fashion ... It really is a bold filmmaking storytelling style, but something that we all feel the show warrants after six years. We didn't want to do something that we had done before so we took a big swing and it was very exciting to be able to do that." Laura Bradley of Slate and Leah Marilla Thomas of Bustle both praised the use of black and white; however, many fans were mixed about the scenes and expressed their opinions on social media.

== Reception ==
=== Critical reception ===
The episode received critical acclaim. On Rotten Tomatoes, it holds a 92% with an average rating of 8.48 out of 10, based on 26 reviews. The critics' consensus reads: "A knockout opener to The Walking Dead's sixth season, 'First Time Again' has everything one would hope for - including intense plot development, entertaining character interplay, and more zombies than ever before."

Variety's Brian Lowry assessed that "The Walking Dead looks very much at the top of its game, with strong character material mixed with a massive set piece in the extended premiere made possible, no doubt, by its enormous popularity. Blessed and cursed with a vagabond mentality, the first episode finds the gang still trying to fit into a gated community, where the promise of security is balanced against the cultural clash separating the battle-hardened travelers from those sheltered within. Add one familiar face to the mix, and it's a pretty irresistible feast". Brandon Davis of ComicBook.com praised the episode and felt that Andrew Lincoln gave his best performance to date, as well as its unique storytelling of shots in the past and present, while also singling out the character of Carol Peletier, writing: "Though not given a hefty amount of screen time, McBride's Carol Peletier remains a strong foundation for the group with her sly performance as the undercover post-apocalyptic friendly neighbor." He concluded his review writing: "All in all, the premiere is going to satisfy die-hard Walking Dead fans and Walking Dead critics alike. Staunch performances from the well-known cast and tremendous execution of character relationships combine for a satisfying 90-minute premiere of The Walking Dead. Then, they're given the show's largest horde of walkers - ever - to cap things off and send the show back to its roots. Bring on season 6." Writing for Hypable, Andrew Sims also praised the unique storytelling as "much needed" for a show that has five seasons under its belt and wrote: "[the] premiere offers fans one of the most exciting and original episodes in recent memory."

Alex Zalben of MTV praised it as "...the most ambitious thing they've done in six seasons... And they nail it", while complimenting the character dynamics of the episode as well as its humor, declaring it as possibly "the funniest episode of 'The Walking Dead' ever". He singled out Danai Gurira as Michonne and Melissa McBride as Carol at the bulk of the humor. In particular, he praised Carol by writing: "Carol, in particular, is a jaw-dropping, hilarious surprise in the hour. As much as she was reinvented into a deadly badass in season four and five, season six finds her taking a surprising turn that makes total sense for where she's been, and where she's going. Suffice to say, Carol — and McBride — continues to be the stealth weapon of the Grimes Gang." The return of Lennie James was also highlighted. In addition, Zalben noted the pacing remaining consistent, as he pointed out that fans "worried that the Group settling down in one location a la season two's Hershel's Farm meant we're in for a slow year full of lots of talking and hand wringing... Don't worry. Not only has Gimple led his company to showing instead of telling, and making the dialogue scenes actually count versus repeating the same themes over and over; but the action picks up from the very first scene, and doesn't let up. And isn't going to let up any time soon. The episode is an incredible, complete package, as big as you'd want a 'Walking Dead' movie to be; but it also shows how things start off bad — and as usual, are only getting to get way, way worse."

IGN's Matt Fowler praised Rick's leadership and gave the episode an 8.5 out of 10, writing: "Though it may have repeated some of Season 5's final act conflict by giving Rick a mini-foe in Carter, 'First Time Again' was a great kick off for Season 6. Only Rick could be genius/insane enough to attempt to wrangle a sea of walkers the way he did and the show's going to solid lengths depicting him as a one-of-a-kind leader."

In 2018, Ben Lindbergh of The Ringer ranked Rick's plan in the episode as his worst plan in terms of stupidity. Lindbergh wrote: "I'm just one man with zero walker kills to his credit, but I'd say the simple thing would have been to keep the walkers in the quarry. Maybe build a better barricade to seal them in more securely. Maybe construct some sort of funnel so that the herd emerges one walker at a time for easy slaughter. Maybe set them on fire, sit back, and watch them burn. There are options!"

=== Ratings ===
In its initial broadcast on AMC in the United States, on October 11, 2015, the episode received 14.63 million viewers. The viewership slightly declined from the previous season's record breaking premiere, "No Sanctuary", but was the most-watched television series of the night. Cumulative viewership, comprising those who watched the episode live, when it first aired, plus those who watched the episode within three days after its original broadcast, was 19.5 million.

In the United Kingdom, the episode broke records and became the most-watched of the series, garnering 800,000 viewers upon airing.

=== Accolades ===
The episode and its sound mixers (Michael P. Clark, Gary D. Rogers, Daniel J. Hiland, and Eric Gotthelf) received a nomination for the "Cinema Audio Society Award for Outstanding Achievement in Sound Mixing for Television Series – One Hour" at the 52nd Cinema Audio Society Awards.
