= Always Accountable =

- The Walking Dead episode
- Daryl and Dwight hide from an unknown group led by a man named "Wade", who orders them to return what they took.
- Episode no.: Season 6 Episode 6
- Directed by: Jeffrey F. January
- Written by: Heather Bellson
- Cinematography by: Michael E. Satrazemis
- Editing by: Rachel Goodlett Katz
- Original air date: November 15, 2015
- Running time: 44 minutes

Guest appearances
- Austin Amelio as Dwight; Christine Evangelista as Sherry; Darin Cooper as Wade; Matt Lowe as Cam; Liz E. Morgan as Tina

Episode chronology
← Previous "Now"	Next → "Heads Up"
- The Walking Dead season 6

"Always Accountable" is the sixth episode of the sixth season of the post-apocalyptic horror television series The Walking Dead, which aired on AMC on November 15, 2015. The episode was written by Heather Bellson and directed by Jeffrey F. January.

This episode focuses on Abraham, Sasha and Daryl's plotlines after the events of "Thank You". It marks the first appearance of the characters Dwight and his wife Sherry from the comic books, who are played by Austin Amelio and Christine Evangelista, respectively.

== Plot ==
Daryl, Sasha, and Abraham, leading the parade of walkers away from Alexandria, reach the pre-determined point where they believe the walkers will continue away from the town, and turn to head back. They are ambushed by several men in cars, and Daryl is separated from Sasha and Abraham.

Daryl evades the attackers but crashes his motorcycle in a forest. He walks through a burned-out path before coming upon a pair of sisters Tina (Liz E. Morgan) and Sherry (Christine Evangelista). The two feign surrendering to Daryl, allowing Dwight (Austin Amelio), hiding nearby, to knock him out and take his weapons. Kept under gunpoint, Daryl is forced to travel with them as they look for "Patty". Dwight explains they were trying to flee a community that they had joined, but were forced to "kneel", and now are trying to escape. They come to a walker-infested gas station, and Dwight laments that "Patty" is no longer there.

Meanwhile, Sasha and Abraham fend off their attackers, and determine the attackers were lying in wait to ambush another party. They find an insurance office in a nearby town and hole up there, leaving signs for Daryl to locate them. In the office, a walker is trapped in a glass-enclosed conference room, which Abraham wants to kill. Sasha reminds him of the consequences of his actions as they are trying to otherwise stay hidden until Daryl can find them.

Daryl attempts to escape his captors with their supplies but discovers their bag includes insulin for a diabetic Tina. He returns, demanding Dwight turn over his gun in exchange for the insulin, when the group is attacked by more men in a truck led by Wade (Darin Cooper). Wade demands Dwight, Sherry, and Tina return what they took. Daryl is able to help them escape, in turn luring one of Wade's men named Cam (Matt Lowe) into a walker. The walker bites Cam in the left arm, forcing Wade to cut it off therefore ending their pursuit. Daryl continues with Dwight, Sherry, and Tina and come to the remains of a greenhouse. Tina sees two figures encased in melted glass, but when she tries to examine them, the figures are still re-animated walkers that break free of the glass and kill her. Daryl helps the two dispatch the walkers and bury Tina. Daryl then considers bringing them to Alexandria, though does not tell them of the location. When they agree, he leads them back to his motorcycle, after which Dwight puts Daryl at gunpoint and demands his crossbow and motorcycle. Daryl turns them over, and Dwight and Sherry take off. Continuing on his own, Daryl finds a fuel truck, with a license plate "PATTY002", nearby, and realizes this was the "Patty" Dwight sought. He takes the truck to rejoin his friends.

The next morning, Abraham scavenges the local area, and finds an abandoned Humvee containing RPGs and a box of cigars, on a bridge. Hanging precariously from the bridge is a reanimated soldier with the RPG launcher slung over its shoulder. Abraham recklessly manages to get the launcher but nearly at the cost of his own life. He returns to the office with his finds, and apologizes to Sasha that he does act without thought, and wants to be a better person with her help. Later, he finds a partial Army dress uniform and dons it as he and Sasha set off to meet Daryl. They find him with the truck, and the three start to head back to Alexandria, but hear a cry for help over the truck's radio.

== Reception ==
=== Critical reception ===
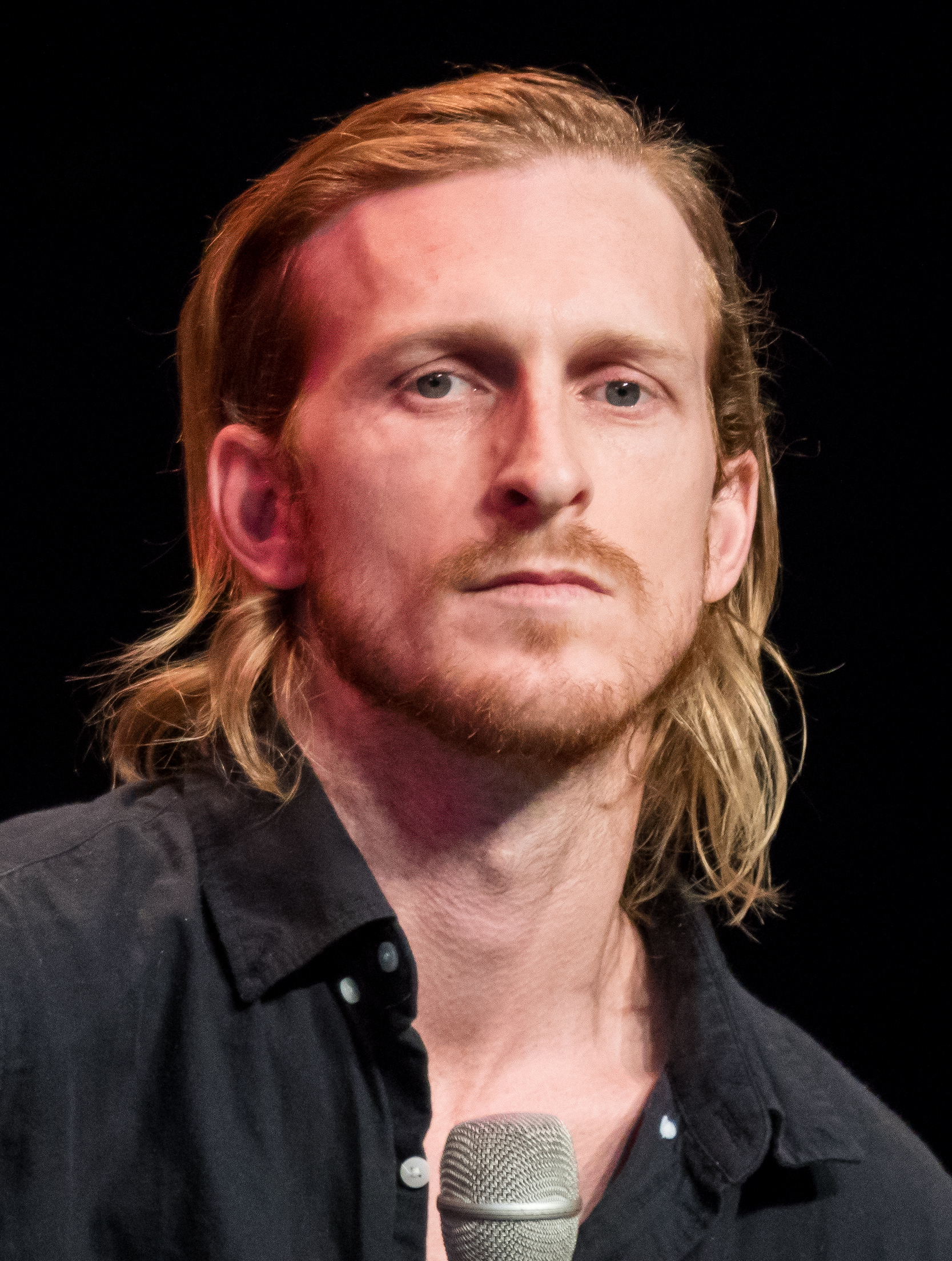
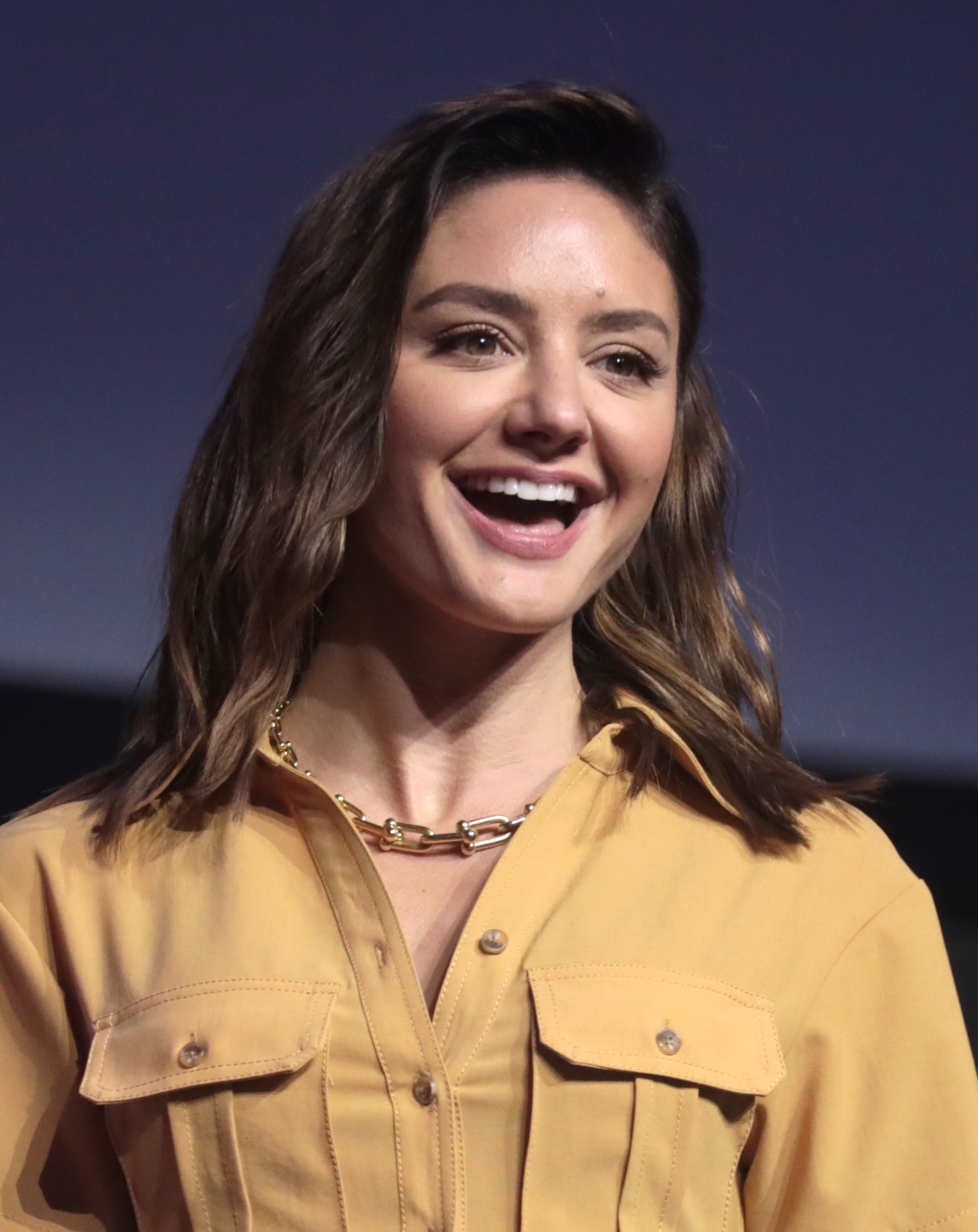
This episode marks the debut of Austin Amelio (left) as Dwight and Christine Evangelista (right) as Sherry.

The episode received positive reviews from critics. It currently holds an 87% rating with an average score of 6.6 out of 10 on Rotten Tomatoes, with the critical consensus: "Something of a filler episode for The Walking Dead, 'Always Accountable' comes to life in its final moments with an exciting cliffhanger." Matt Fowler of IGN, gave it a 7.3 out of 10 in his review and commented, "Time for characters to reflect on shock and tragedy. It's the way this show works. It's what this story demands." Zack Handlen of The A.V. Club gave it a B+ and wrote, "Most of what happens in 'Always Accountable' is about laying the groundwork for the future. Nowhere is that more apparent than in the final seconds."

=== Ratings ===
The episode averaged a 6.5 rating in adults 18-49 and 12.871 million viewers overall, an increase from the previous episode, which averaged a 6.2 rating and 12.44 million viewers overall.
