= Start to Finish =

- The Walking Dead episode
- Deanna faces the herd before letting out one last defiant scream.
- Episode no.: Season 6 Episode 8
- Directed by: Michael E. Satrazemis
- Written by: Matthew Negrete
- Cinematography by: Stephen Campbell
- Editing by: Dan Liu
- Original air date: November 29, 2015
- Running time: 43 minutes

Guest appearances
- Merritt Wever as Dr. Denise Cloyd; Corey Hawkins as Heath; Benedict Samuel as Owen; Jason Douglas as Tobin; Austin Abrams as Ron Anderson; Major Dodson as Sam Anderson; Christopher Berry as Bud; Mandi Christine Kerr as Barbara; Katelyn Nacon as Enid; David Marshall Silverman as Kent

Episode chronology
← Previous "Heads Up"	Next → "No Way Out"
- The Walking Dead season 6

"Start to Finish" is the eighth episode and mid-season finale of the sixth season of the post-apocalyptic horror television series The Walking Dead, which aired on AMC on November 29, 2015. The episode was written by Matthew Negrete and directed by Michael E. Satrazemis.

The episode focuses on the survivors fleeing and finding shelter from the gargantuan swarm of walkers that have invaded the Alexandria Safe-Zone.

== Plot ==
The church tower smashes three panels of the wall, and everyone scrambles for whatever shelter they can find as hundreds of walkers pour inside Alexandria. Maggie is forced up the ladder to a lookout post and lies back on the platform, trapped but out of sight from the walkers that surround the lookout post. Eugene finds a walkie-talkie on the ground but only mutters "help" before being rescued by Tara and Rosita and taking shelter in a garage. The group of Rick, Carl, Judith, Michonne, Gabriel, Deanna, and her sons Ron and Sam take shelter in the home of Jessie. Outside the wall, Glenn convinces Enid to enter Alexandria and help the others. They climb the wall opposite the breach and spot Maggie trapped atop a lookout post.

At Jessie's house, Deanna is discovered to be bitten. Later, Carl checks on a distressed Ron who blames Rick for what's happening and lashes out at Carl, breaking a garage window and drawing the attention of walkers. Rick breaks down the interior garage door to extract the boys as the walkers enter; Carl covers for Ron while confiscating his handgun.

Meanwhile, Carol takes shelter with Morgan in his house. She feigns a concussion to have Morgan drop his guard, attacks him, and breaks into the basement. Denise has been locked down there treating the captured Wolf. Carol threatens the Wolf with a knife, but Morgan interposes himself between them. They fight and Morgan defeats her but he is then blindsided by the Wolf.

Eugene picks the interior door lock of a garage to gain entry to the attached home. He, Tara, and Rosita end up walking in on the Wolf who holds Carol's knife to Denise's throat, taking her hostage. They surrender their weapons to him, and the Wolf escapes with Denise.

The damage Ron caused in the garage allows the walkers to break into Jessie's house, forcing everyone to retreat to the second floor. Knowing they will soon be overrun, Rick decides to make a desperate attempt at escape: he kills and guts two walkers, hoping they can camouflage themselves with their insides and pass through the herd. They slowly reach the porch while Deanna, left behind, kills several walkers before letting them kill her. Holding hands to stay together, the group enters the walker-infested street quiet but for a frightened Sam who repeatedly calls out for his mother.

In a post-credits scene, Daryl, Abraham and Sasha are still headed back to Alexandria, but are stopped by a group of bikers blocking the road. One biker tells them to give up their supplies and truck, to which, Daryl asks, "Why should we?". The biker then claims, "Your property, now belongs to Negan".

== Reception ==
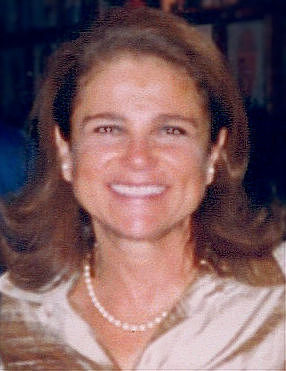
The episode marks the death of Deanna Monroe played by Tovah Feldshuh.

=== Critical reception ===
"Start to Finish" received poor reviews from critics. The episode received a 36% rating with an average score of 6.23 out of 10 on the review aggregator Rotten Tomatoes. The critics' consensus reads: ""Start to Finish" fails to live up to The Walking Dead's potential with a midseason finale that is both dull and frustrating." According to Rotten Tomatoes, "Start to Finish" was the worst reviewed episode of the series until it was surpassed by the eight season episode "The King, the Widow, and Rick".

Matt Fowler of IGN gave it a 7.3 out of 10 and wrote in his verdict: ""Start to Finish" gets points for keeping Alexandria around and in the mix, but loses a bunch for dropping us right as things started to get exciting. Especially since the rest of the episode was filled with conflicts we hoped we wouldn't have to see in the midst of a giant walker invasion (Carl/Ron, Carol/Morgan)."

Zack Handlen of The A.V. Club gave it a C+ grade and wrote, "a bunch of cliffhangers sounds like a smart way to close things out for the year, but none of this is promising us the sight of anything new." He also wrote "the only scene tonight that sets up a new storyline happened after the credits—happened, in fact, ten minutes after “Start To Finish” (sic) had actually ended. But judging this hour on its own terms, it’s full of clumsy, stupid people doing clumsy, stupid things."

=== Ratings ===
The episode received 13.98 million viewers, an increase from the previous episode, which had 13.22 million viewers overall.
