= Ellen Ford =

Ellen Ford may refer to:

- Ellen Ford, one of the first women in WAVES
- Ellen Ford, fictional character in Self Help (The Walking Dead)

== See also ==
- Helen Ford, actress
