= JSS (The Walking Dead) =

- The Walking Dead episode
- Carol kills the Wolves who invade Alexandria, in disguise as one of them.
- Episode no.: Season 6 Episode 2
- Directed by: Jennifer Lynch
- Written by: Seth Hoffman
- Cinematography by: Michael E. Satrazemis
- Editing by: Rachel Goodlett Katz
- Original air date: October 18, 2015
- Running time: 43 minutes

Guest appearances
- Merritt Wever as Dr. Denise Cloyd; Benedict Samuel as Owen; Austin Abrams as Ron Anderson; Major Dodson as Sam Anderson; Jesse Boyd as Edward; Claire Bronson as Mom; Jason Alexander Davis as Dad; Ann Mahoney as Olivia; Tiffany Morgan as Erin; Katelyn Nacon as Enid; Alec Rayme as Red Jacket Wolf; Elena Sanchez as Satchel Wolf; Labrandon Shead as Shaved Head Wolf; Susie Spear as Mrs. Neudermeyer; Lance Tafelski as Black Bearded Wolf; Jordan Woods-Robinson as Eric Raleigh

Episode chronology
| ← Previous "First Time Again" | Next → "Thank You" |
- The Walking Dead season 6

"JSS" is the second episode of the sixth season of the post-apocalyptic horror television series The Walking Dead, which aired on AMC on October 18, 2015. The episode was written by Seth Hoffman and directed by Jennifer Lynch.

== Plot ==
In a flashback, Enid's parents are killed by walkers while trying to change a fuse, in order to start their car. Locked in the now-bloodied car, Enid cries after seeing her parents killed. She escapes and wanders the woods alone, foraging for food and shelter, hiding from and killing walkers. She writes the letters "JSS" in the dirt and on a dusty window. Enid eventually stumbles upon Alexandria's gates. She initially starts to walk away, but then scrawls "JSS" on her hand and goes inside.

In the present, Carol collects ingredients from the pantry. Shelly complains about wanting a pasta maker, and Carol offers to teach her to make hand-made pasta, if Shelly drops her cigarette habit. Carol returns home, where she sees Sam waiting for her and coldly tells him to get over Pete's death. Jessie tries to give Ron a haircut, but they get into an argument about Rick's role in Pete's death and Ron storms out. Meanwhile, Maggie takes Deanna outside the walls to discuss expansion efforts, and urges her to get past Reg's death and become Alexandria's leader again. Eugene and Tara head to the infirmary to get aspirin for Tara's headache and meet Denise Cloyd (Merritt Wever), Alexandria's replacement doctor. Denise confides to them that she is a psychiatrist, and as she has not practiced surgery since medical school, she feels unequipped to fill Pete's role. Carl takes a walk in his neighborhood, and sees Ron and Enid sitting together before being asked by Gabriel for self-defense lessons. Though reluctant, Carl tells him to come by to learn how to wield a machete.

As Carol prepares a meal, she looks outside and sees Shelly being killed by a Wolf. Suddenly, numerous Wolves scale Alexandria's walls and kill any Alexandrian they come across. Holly is mortally wounded in the attack. Carl fortifies himself inside his house with Judith. Enid comes by, expressing her intention to abandon Alexandria. Carl convinces her to stay.

In the watch tower, Spencer sees a truck approaching the fence and fires on it, killing the driver but inadvertently activating the truck's horn. He goes down to shut it off and runs into Morgan. Spencer informs Morgan of the Wolf attack but is too scared to fight. As panic ensues, Carol quickly arms herself and kills several of the attackers, before disguising herself as a Wolf. Morgan meets up with Carol, and she realizes that the Wolves do not have any firearms. Carol goes to the armory to stock up on firearms.

Maggie leaves Deanna in Spencer's care before joining the battle. Carl rescues Ron from a Wolf, but Ron refuses to go inside the house with Carl and Enid. Jessie kills a Wolf who breaks into her house just as Ron enters the house.

Morgan breaks off to save Gabriel, and Carol continues alone, killing many Wolves along the way. Carol secures the armory and distributes guns to the surviving Alexandrians. She executes a Wolf that Morgan had taken prisoner, and Morgan openly disagrees with Carol's belief that the Wolves must be killed. Morgan separates from the group again and runs into another group of Wolves, led by one he had previously encountered. However, Morgan convinces the Wolves to retreat by pointing out that the Alexandrians have guns and they do not.

In the aftermath of the battle, Rosita and Aaron kill several Wolves, and upon inspecting one of the corpses, Aaron finds his backpack full of recruiting materials (which he'd left behind when escaping a zombie horde at the food factory) and realizes the Wolves found Alexandria because of him. Despite their best efforts, Denise is unable to save Holly. Denise tells Tara and Eugene that she wants to be left alone, and Tara reminds her to destroy Holly's brain.

Meanwhile, Morgan is ambushed by the other Wolf he had previously encountered. The Wolf taunts Morgan for not killing him when he had the chance, and Morgan subdues him before knocking him unconscious. Carl finds a farewell note from Enid, that reads "Just Survive Somehow". Later, Morgan and Carol cross paths on the street and keep walking.

== Reception ==
=== Critical reception ===
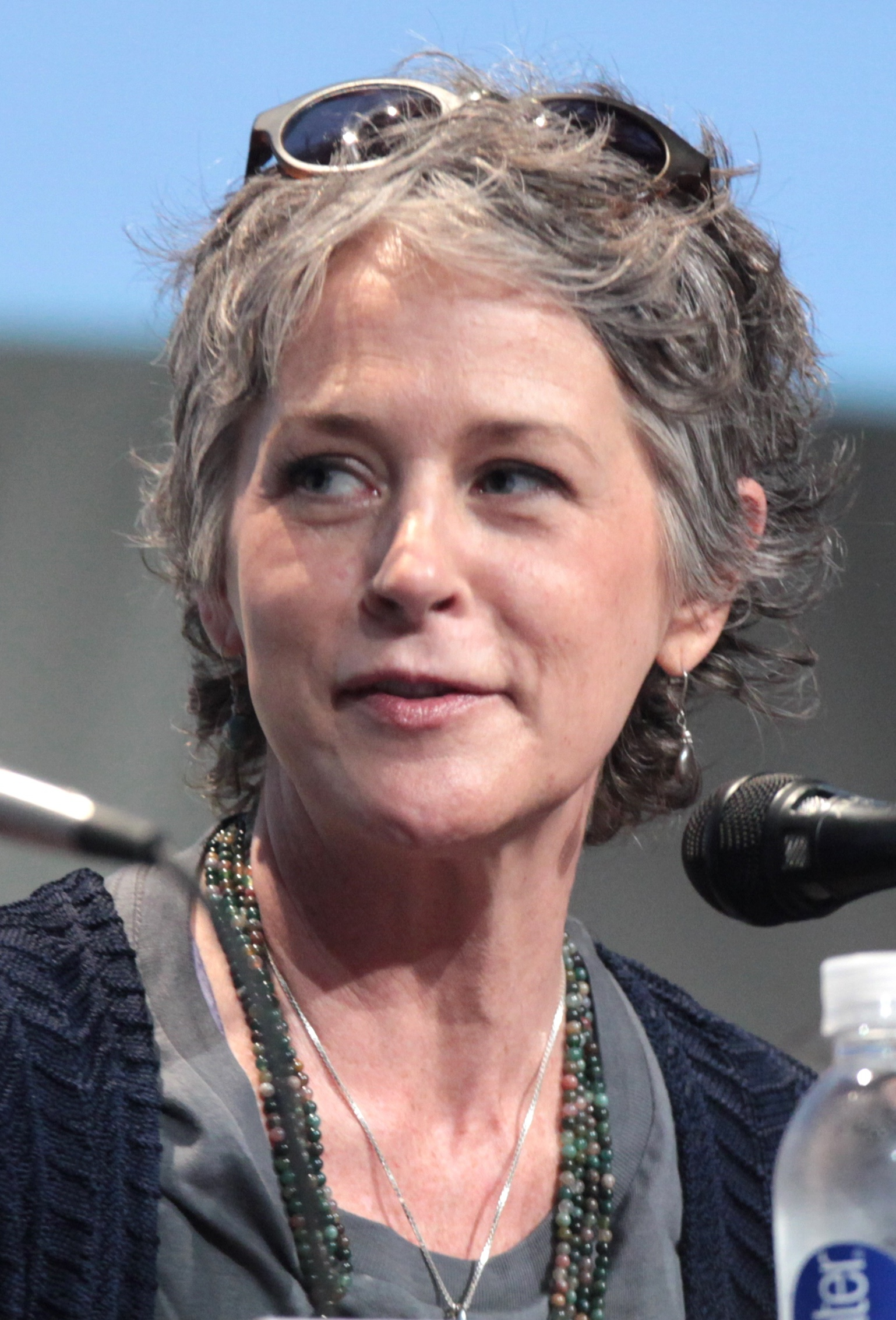
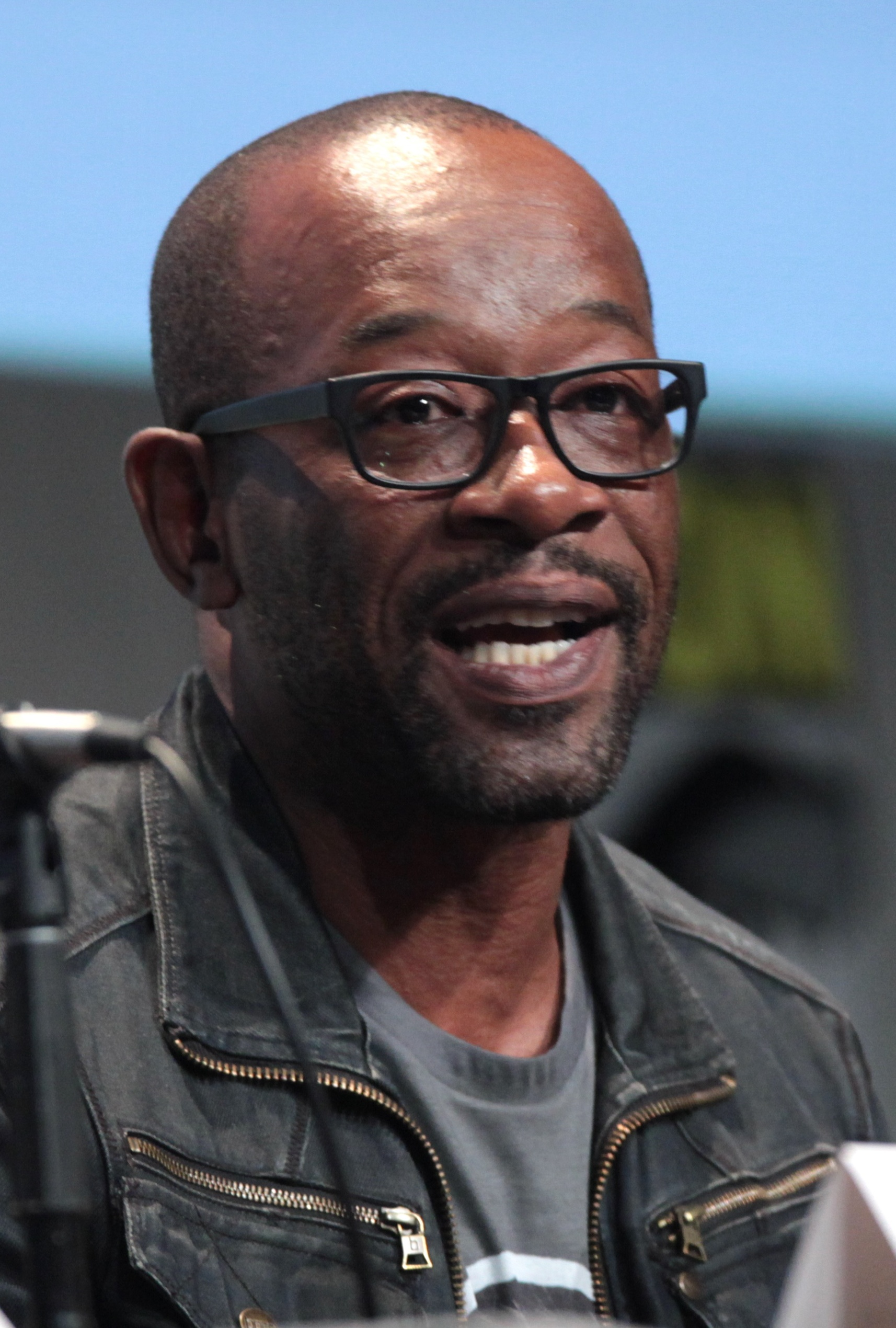
Melissa McBride (left) and Lennie James (right)'s performances were praised by critics, with many praising the characters' contrasting views.

The episode received critical acclaim. It earned a 97% rating with an average score of 8.88 out of 10 on Rotten Tomatoes, whose consensus reads: "Loaded with thrilling action, 'JSS' is a terrific example of The Walking Dead making the most of its varied characters." Many noted McBride's performance, as well as James', the surprising and intense Wolves assault in Alexandria, and Enid's backstory.

Zack Handlen of The A.V. Club graded the episode an A, noting McBride's powerful role as Carol.

Matt Fowler of IGN gave it a 9.3 out of 10, praising McBride, the opening scene featuring Enid, and the intense action scenes. He showed surprise on the sudden start of the Wolves attack, but criticized Denise's dilemma as being less compelling than the other scenes.

=== Ratings ===
In its initial broadcast on AMC in the United States, on October 18, 2015, the episode received 12.18 million viewers. The episode was down from the season premiere, which had 14.63 million viewers, and was also the least-watched episode of the series since the middle of the fourth season.

Within three days, including DVR playback, the episode was watched by 17.08 million viewers.
