= Here's Not Here =

- The Walking Dead episode
- Morgan and Eastman practice aikido.
- Episode no.: Season 6 Episode 4
- Directed by: Stephen Williams
- Written by: Scott M. Gimple
- Cinematography by: Michael E. Satrazemis
- Editing by: Rachel Goodlett Katz
- Original air date: November 1, 2015
- Running time: 64 minutes

Guest appearances
- John Carroll Lynch as Eastman; Benedict Samuel as Owen; LB Brown as Young Man; H. Patrik Coyne as 20s Man; Chris Gann as 40s Man; Bethany Anne Lind as Young Woman

Episode chronology
← Previous "Thank You"	Next → "Now"
- The Walking Dead season 6

Here's Not Here is the fourth episode of the sixth season of the post-apocalyptic horror television series The Walking Dead, which aired on AMC on November 1, 2015. The episode was written by Scott M. Gimple and directed by Stephen Williams.

This episode is the second episode in the show's history to feature only one main cast member (after "Live Bait", which is centered on The Governor), and it focuses on the experiences of Morgan Jones (Lennie James) between the episodes "Clear" (season 3) and "No Sanctuary" (season 5).

== Plot ==
After the Wolves attack on Alexandria is repelled, Morgan secretly imprisons the Wolf he had captured in the unfinished ground floor of an unoccupied Alexandria townhouse. To redeem the Wolf by convincing him to renounce his violent ways, Morgan decides to tell him about his past.

Flashbacks show Morgan's life sometime after Rick's brief reunion with him. Morgan exhibits deranged and obsessive behaviour and accidentally burns his house down when he knocks over a lamp. Morgan then camps out in the forest where he lives with his illness and kills any walkers or humans that intrude upon his marked territory, including a father and son who cross his path.

While further exploring the forest, Morgan follows the bleating of a goat, named Tabitha, and finds the remote cabin of Eastman (John Carroll Lynch) who calls out to him, offering to talk and feed him despite Morgan's attempts to shoot him, eventually knocking Morgan out with a bō stick. Morgan awakens in a cell in the cabin, behind bars, and orders Eastman to kill him. Eastman instead feeds Morgan and gives him a tract, The Art of Peace. Eastman goes about his peaceful life, taking care of Tabitha and trying to make cheese. After giving Morgan a while to adjust, Eastman explains that he was a forensic psychiatrist employed by Georgia to evaluate convicts before release. Though Morgan admits to being an unrepentant killer who lives only to "clear" areas of walkers and the living, Eastman sees that Morgan has PTSD over the loss of his family. He also reveals that the cell was never locked and Morgan is free to go. Morgan attempts to attack Eastman who proves capable of reading intent and defending himself with aikido. Beaten, Morgan returns to his cell.

Eastman begins talking about a trip, though he has no specific destination in mind, and leaves to scavenge supplies. Morgan leaves the cell to rescue Tabitha from attack by a pair of walkers and discovers a graveyard where Eastman has buried at least two dozen bodies. Eastman thanks Morgan on his return, they repair the damage together, and Eastman gives Morgan a bō stick and begins teaching him aikido.

Eastman begins recounting more of his personal life to Morgan, and how his job had him suffering emotional distress over working near violent offenders. Practicing Aikido helped him, and he realized that all life is precious. Morgan later recounts how he lost his wife and son to walkers. Eastman tells of the one true psychopath he'd met, Crighton Dallas Wilton, who attacked him during an interview and later escaped to kill Eastman's wife, son, and daughter. Eastman reveals he had the cell built to hold Wilton, but evades whether he did it, repeating that he believes all life is precious.

To gather supplies for their trip, Morgan takes Eastman to his camp. The setting brings back old feelings and behavioral patterns, and Morgan freezes when the walker of the young man he'd strangled comes at him. Eastman saves Morgan but is bitten, and Morgan lashes out at Eastman, wanting to die again. Eastman subdues Morgan and the two part ways. Morgan regresses and resumes patrolling his territory, killing a walker and inadvertently saving a couple who reward him with a large can of soup and a single bullet.

Morgan takes up the bō staff, recognizing that Eastman's way is better, and returns to the cabin only to find a walker feasting on Tabitha. Morgan kills the walker and takes its body and Tabitha's to the graveyard where he finds Eastman succumbing to the bite. Morgan spots a grave marker with Wilton's name and Eastman confesses to kidnapping Wilton and starving him to death over 47 days, over which Eastman lost himself, and when he went to Atlanta to turn himself in he found that society had collapsed. Eastman bequeaths all he has to Morgan, including a rabbit's foot his daughter gave him, but advises Morgan to find more people and live. After burying Eastman and Tabitha, Morgan begins searching and finds a sign that leads to Terminus.

In the present, Morgan finishes his story. The Wolf prisoner reveals that he has an infected gut wound and probably doesn't have time to change, though he doesn't want to, and isn't repentant about following his code to kill everyone in Alexandria. Morgan locks the door as he exits the townhome. In the street, Morgan hears Rick screaming to open the gate.

== Production ==
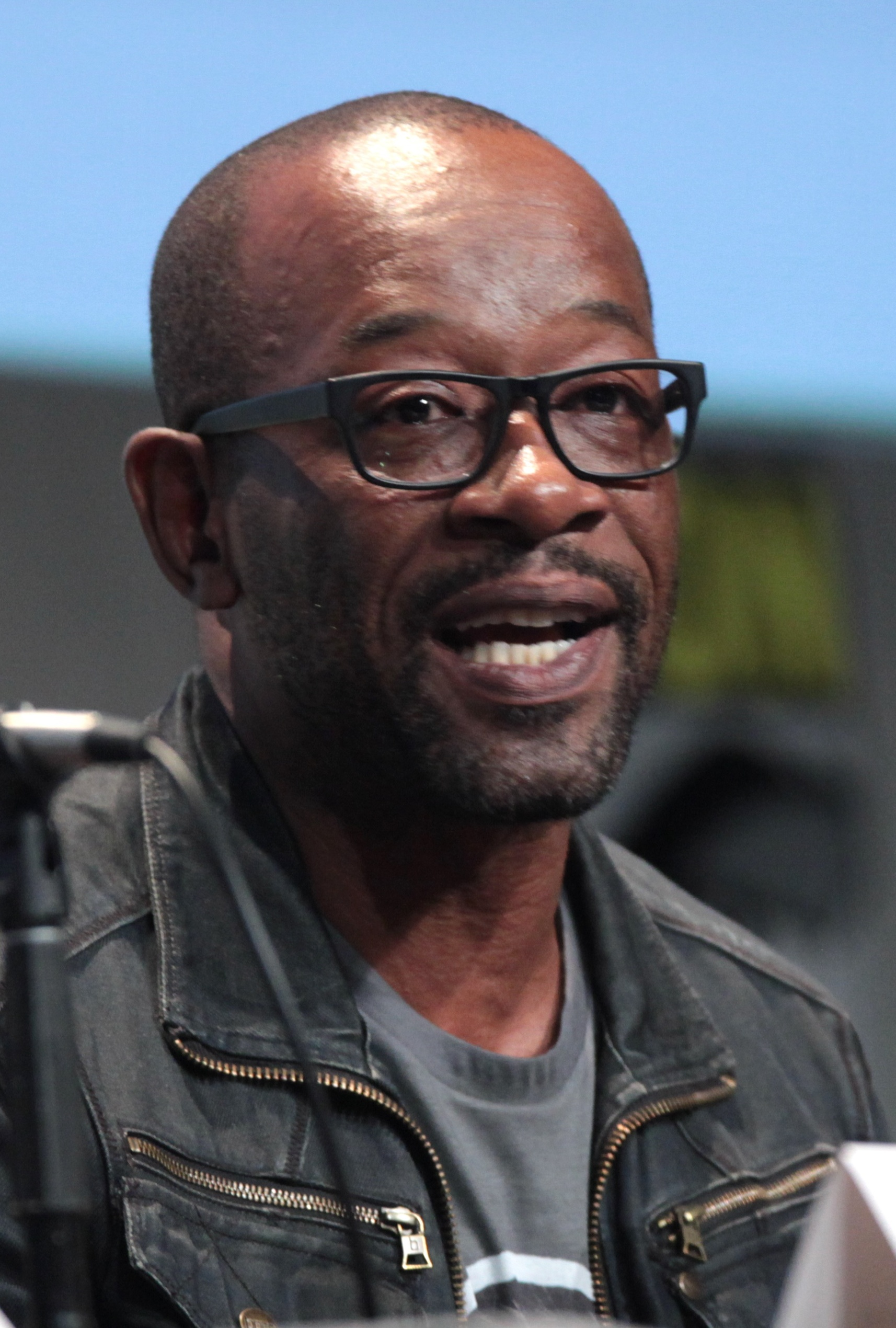
Lennie James who portrays Morgan Jones was praised by critics for his performance in this episode.

Showrunner and executive producer Scott M. Gimple wrote the episode in July 2015, during San Diego Comic-Con, and said about "Here's Not Here": "Working on that episode was one of the great pleasures of the season for me." The episode was Stephen Williams' first directing credit for the series. Out of 17 credited series regulars, only Lennie James appears. Andrew Lincoln's voice is briefly included at the end, and the episode features a guest appearance by John Carroll Lynch. Steven Yeun, who portrays Glenn, is removed from the opening credits with this episode; commentators speculated whether this was done intentionally to further indicate Glenn's fate (dead or alive). Despite airing as the fourth episode of the season, this was actually the ninth episode filmed. The episode was also the second expanded 90-minute (with commercials) episode this season, after the season premiere.

== Reception ==
=== Critical reception ===
Upon airing, the episode received widespread critical acclaim, earning a 93% rating with an average score of 8.9/10 on Rotten Tomatoes, with the consensus that "'Here's Not Here' is a stand-out installment of The Walking Dead, using Morgan's backstory as a powerful reminder of what it means to be human."

Particular praise was given for the performances of Lennie James as Morgan Jones and John Carroll Lynch as Eastman. Jonathon Dornbush of Entertainment Weekly notes that during the episode, "The Walking Dead becomes a two-man play that succeeds or fails based on the performances of Lennie James and guest star John Carroll Lynch...And wow, does it succeed."

For his role as Eastman, Lynch was nominated for the Saturn Award for Best Guest Starring Role on Television.

=== Ratings ===
The episode averaged a 6.8 rating in adults 18-49 and 13.339 million viewers overall, a rise from the previous episode, which averaged a 6.7 rating and 13.143 million.
