= Kate Moira Ryan =

American playwright

- Born: United States
- Occupation: Playwright

Kate Moira Ryan is an American playwright.

Among the plays Ryan has worked on are Leaving Queens; The Beebo Brinker Chronicles, an adaptation of three books by Ann Bannon; Caveweller; and Bass for Picasso.

Ryan was the co-writer of comedian Judy Gold's one-woman show, 25 Questions for a Jewish Mother. It is based on a series of interviews with more than 50 Jewish mothers in the United States. Their stories are interspersed with anecdotes about Gold's own mother and her life as a lesbian mother of two sons.
