= Kenric Green =

American actor, writer and producer (born 1982)

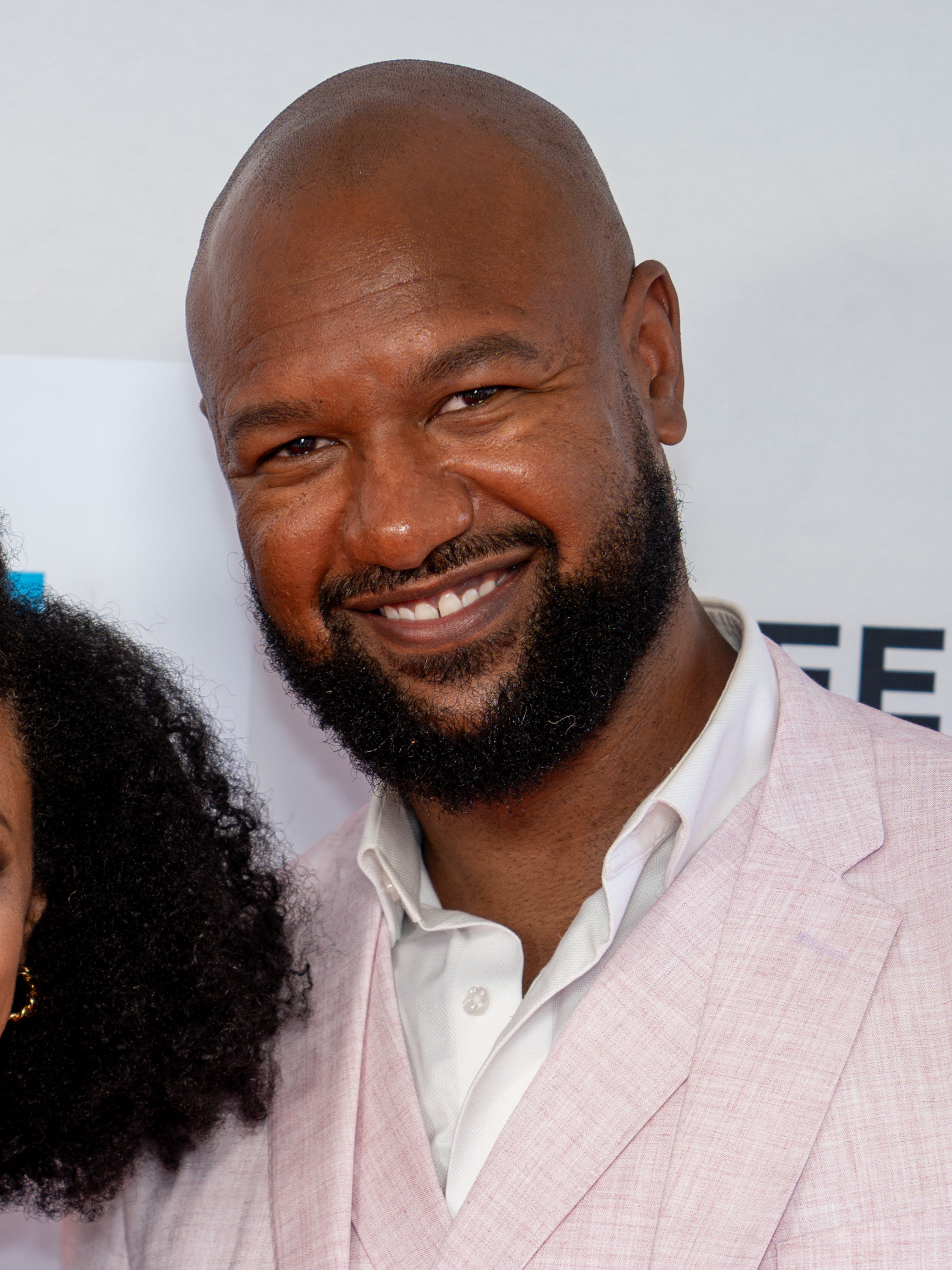
- Green in 2025
- Born: March 31, 1982 (age 44); Southern California, U.S.
- Education: Mt. San Antonio College
- Occupations: Actor; writer; producer
- Years active: 2006–present
- Known for: The Walking Dead (2015–2022)
- Spouse: Sonequa Martin (m. 2010)
- Children: 2

Kenric Green (born March 30, 1982) is an American actor, writer and producer who began his career in 2006. He is best known for his portrayal of Scott in the television series The Walking Dead. He has also appeared in Star Trek: Discovery and Hawaii Five-0.

== Early life and career ==
Green was born in Southern California. He is married to fellow actor Sonequa Martin-Green, with whom he has two children.

== Filmography ==
=== Film ===
Year	Title	Role	Notes
2006	They're Just My Friends	Inmate	
2006	Helen at Risk	Prisoner	Short
2009	Let Me Go	Detective	
2012	Victoriana	Police Officer	
2014	On the Bridge	Marc	Short
2018	Badges	Philip	Short
2025	Sarah's Oil	Joe Rector	Post-production

=== Television ===
Year	Title	Role	Notes
2012	Evil I	Nathaniel White	1 episode
2014	Just Divorced	Pastor	1 episode
2015-2022	The Walking Dead	Scott	Recurring role; (Season 6–Season 10); Guest role; (Season 11); 29 episodes.
2017	The Originals	Lead Acolyte	Season 4, Episode 12: "Voodoo Child"
2018	Hawaii Five-0	Detective Keegan	Season 8, Episode 13: "O Ka Mea Ua Hala, Ua Hala Ia"
2019	Star Trek: Discovery	Mike Burnham	Season 2, Episode 11: "Perpetual Infinity"
2019	Star Trek: Short Treks	Mike Burnham (voice)	Season 2, Episode 5: "The Girl Who Made the Stars"
2025-present	Boston Blue	Charlie	

=== Producer and writer ===
Year	Title	Role	Notes
2014	On the Bridge	writer and executive producer	Short
