= Self Help (The Walking Dead) =

- The Walking Dead episode
- Eugene reveals his secret to the stunned group.
- Episode no.: Season 5 Episode 5
- Directed by: Ernest Dickerson
- Written by: Heather Bellson; Seth Hoffman
- Cinematography by: Michael E. Satrazemis
- Editing by: Dan Liu
- Original air date: November 9, 2014

Guest appearance
- Andrea Moore as Ellen Ford

Episode chronology
← Previous "Slabtown"	Next → "Consumed"
- The Walking Dead season 5

"Self Help" is the fifth episode of the fifth season of the post-apocalyptic horror television series The Walking Dead, which aired on AMC on November 9, 2014. The episode was written by Heather Bellson and Seth Hoffman, and directed by Ernest Dickerson. The episode centers on Abraham Ford, Eugene Porter, Rosita Espinosa, Tara Chambler, Glenn Rhee, and Maggie Greene, who have left the church and their fellow survivors to pursue a mission to Washington, D.C., by bus. Upon their journey, they encounter numerous problems, and Abraham's past and his keen desire to continue on the mission are explored throughout the narrative.

The episode received critical acclaim from commentators, many of whom singled out the emotional performance of Michael Cudlitz and the revelation at the end of the episode. This episode adapts material from Volume 12: Life Among Them from the comic book series of the same name.

== Plot ==
Abraham, Rosita, Tara, Maggie, Glenn, and Eugene get into a car crash due to a mechanical breakdown en route to Washington, D.C.. Alerted by the noise, walkers close in.

The group fights through the walkers, and Eugene saves Tara's life despite being terrified. Afterward, the bus catches fire, destroying their supplies. Eugene suggests returning to the church, but Abraham insists on continuing to DC. That night, they make camp in a book shop. Later, Eugene spies on Abraham and Rosita having sex. Tara catches Eugene, and he admits that he sabotaged the fuel line, causing the crash. Eugene says he never intended for them to crash, as the bus wasn't supposed to be able to start. He expresses fear that he would be abandoned once they reach Washington. Tara promises to keep his secret but makes him swear never to endanger them again.

The next morning, they continue to DC despite Rosita and Maggie's protest. They come across a fire truck, which Abraham starts and pulls forward. The fire truck stops, inadvertently unblocking a nearby building's door and freeing a horde of walkers. Eugene uses the fire truck's hose to kill the walkers, impressing Abraham. The fire truck breaks down again shortly after getting on the road. Glenn notices a foul odor caused by the wind carrying the scent of a walker herd at a nearby ranch. Despite everyone wanting to retreat, Abraham insists they move forward. Abraham grabs Eugene to continue, but Eugene suddenly yells out that he has been lying the entire time; he is not a scientist and the supposed cure never existed.

Eugene reveals that he is a former school teacher and a coward, having used his lying skills to find another group to protect him, and that he chose DC as he believes it is the safest spot in the country. Rosita laments that people die for him. Abraham begins beating Eugene, leaving him unconscious. He walks away, falls to his knees, and begins to weep.

In a series of flashbacks, Abraham kills a group of survivors in a grocery store. He calls out for his wife, Ellen, and their children, Becca and AJ, only to find them cowering from him. The next morning, he wakes to find Ellen and the children gone, with a note saying "Don't try to find us". Abraham goes outside and finds all three dead. He prepares to commit suicide, but hears Eugene screaming while being chased by walkers. Abraham saves him, and as he walks away, Eugene tells Abraham that he is on an important mission to Washington.

== Production ==
According to actor Michael Cudlitz via a Tweet, censors tried to ban this episode from airing. Though there were no specifics on what may have caused such a ban, word of it went viral.

== Reception ==
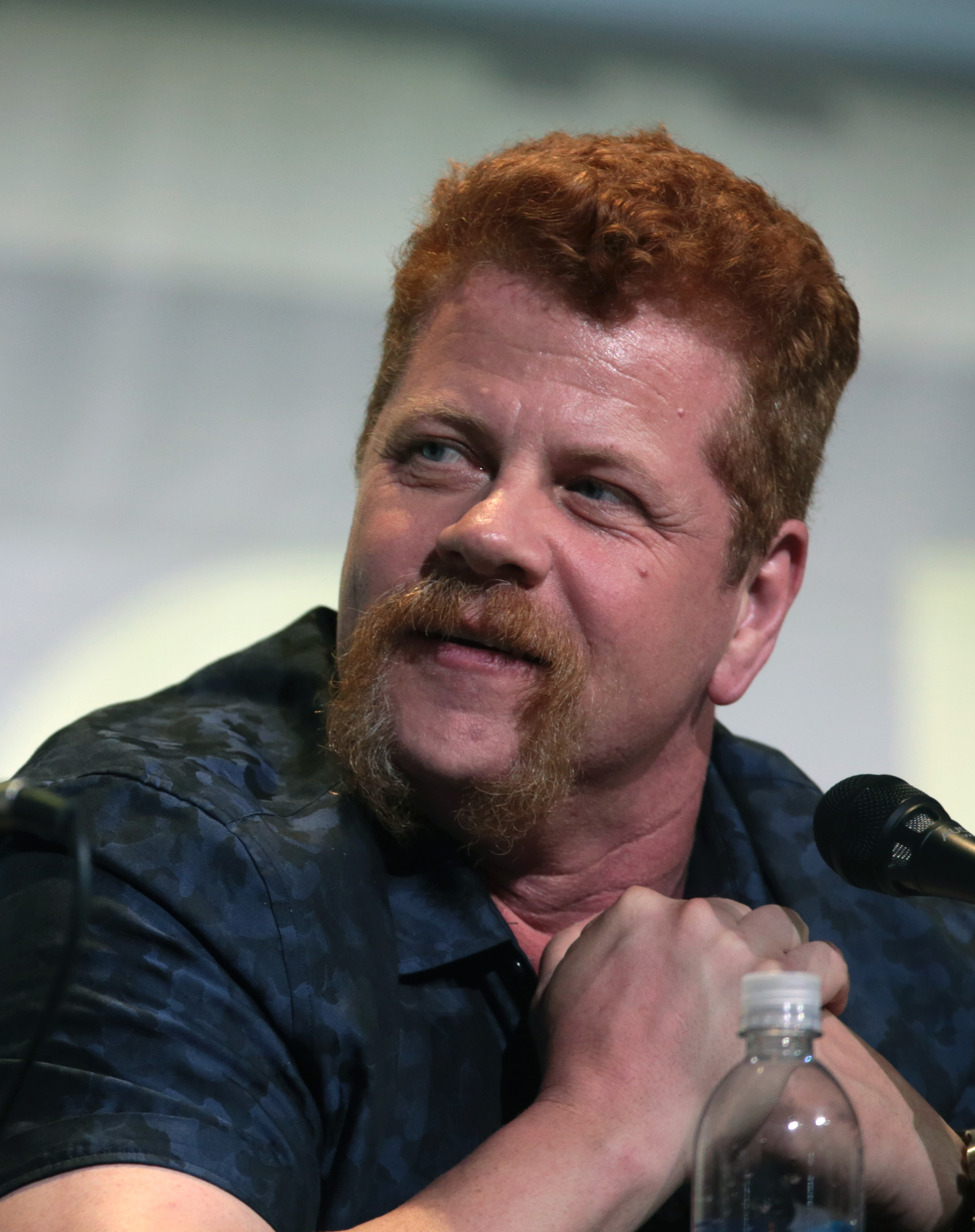
Michael Cudlitz's performance as Abraham in the episode was highly praised by television critics.

Upon airing, the episode was watched by 13.53 million American viewers with an 18-49 rating of 7.0, a decrease in viewership from the previous week which had 14.518 million viewers and an 18-49 rating of 7.6.

In the United Kingdom, the episode was viewed by 1.146 million viewers, making it the highest-rated broadcast that week. It also received 0.096 million timeshift viewers. In Australia, it received 0.087 million viewers, making it the highest-rated cable broadcast that day.

The episode was critically acclaimed, with many reviews highly praising the emotional performance by Michael Cudlitz in the episode.

Zack Handlen of The A.V. Club gave the episode an A grade.

Isabelle Khoo of The Huffington Post said regarding the flashbacks "While I was intrigued to find out more about this strong character, I felt a little disappointed by the flashbacks sprinkled throughout the episode. First of all, each of them were less than two minutes long, and second, the transitions were weirdly abrupt and sometimes confusing. Nonetheless, the flashbacks gave us a tease of Abraham’s past."

Matt Fowler of IGN gave the episode an 8.3 out of 10, saying the episode "gave Abraham and Eugene their first real character-building/revealing story since they came into the series last February. Eugene was using Abraham to survive and, despite the big betrayal, Abraham was using Eugene's lie to help facilitate his own subconscious denial. An inner pain that manifested itself physically through his own never-healing bloody hand."
