= Merritt Wever =

American actress (born 1980)

- Wever in 2026
- Born: Merritt Carmen Wever; August 11, 1980 (age 46); New York City, U.S.
- Education: Sarah Lawrence College
- Occupation: Actress
- Years active: 1995–present

Merritt Carmen Wever (born August 11, 1980) is an American actress. Known for her roles on stage and screen, she has received three Primetime Emmy Awards as well as nominations for an Actor Award, two Critics' Choice Television Awards and a Golden Globe Award.

Wever started her career in independent film before turning to television. She went on to win three Primetime Emmy Awards for her playing an earnest student turned nurse in the Showtime dramedy series Nurse Jackie (2009–2015), a strong-willed widow in the Netflix western miniseries Godless (2017), and an EMT worker in the Apple TV+ drama series Severance (2025). She was Emmy-nominated for her roles in the Netflix limited series Unbelievable (2019), the Hulu miniseries Tiny Beautiful Things (2023), and the HBO period drama series The Gilded Age (2026).

She is also known for her recurring roles in shows such as Studio 60 on the Sunset Strip (2006–2007), New Girl (2013), and The Walking Dead (2015–2016) as well as a leading role in the HBO series Run (2020). She has taken supporting roles in films such as Michael Clayton (2007), Tiny Furniture (2010), Birdman (2014), Welcome to Marwen (2018), Marriage Story (2019), and Primetime (2026).

== Early life and education ==
Merritt Carmen Wever was born on August 11, 1980 in Manhattan, New York City. She was conceived using a sperm donor and raised by her mother, Georgia. Her mother is from Texas, and is a feminist and political activist.

Wever graduated from Fiorello H. LaGuardia High School and Sarah Lawrence College.

== Career ==
Wever began her career starring in low budget, independent short and feature films. She has performed in theater productions, including Brooke Berman's play Smashing and Kate Moira Ryan's Cavedweller, both off-Broadway. Wever appeared in numerous films, including Into the Wild, Michael Clayton, Series 7: The Contenders, Signs, The Adventures of Sebastian Cole, Bringing Rain, Tiny Furniture, and All I Wanna Do.

She has guest-starred on a number of television series, including New Girl, The Good Wife, NCIS, Conviction, Law & Order: Criminal Intent and The Wire. She also starred in Ed Zwick's ill-fated pilot Quarterlife, with Rachel Blanchard, Austin Nichols and Shiri Appleby. She also had a recurring role on Studio 60 on the Sunset Strip as Suzanne.

Wever is perhaps best known for her role as Zoey Barkow in the television series Nurse Jackie, which premiered on Showtime in June 2009. Zoey is described on the official Nurse Jackie website as "an irrepressibly bubbly trauma nurse, who serves as a comic foil to Edie Falco's hard-bitten (and prescription drug-addicted) titular character". Wever received widespread critical acclaim for her role on the show.

Wever was nominated for a Primetime Emmy Award for Outstanding Supporting Actress in a Comedy Series in 2012 and 2013 for her role in Nurse Jackie, winning the award in 2013 and delivering a memorable speech that consisted only of her stunned reaction: "Thanks so much. Thank you so much. I gotta go. Bye."

In 2016, Wever had a recurring role on AMC's The Walking Dead as Denise Cloyd. Her character's death toward the end of the sixth season of the series was controversial and sparked outrage on social media with many fans, most notably members of the LGBT community.

Wever played a lead role in the miniseries Godless (2017) as Mary Agnes McNue, a tough leader of a female-dominated town. She said in interviews that she had been intimidated by the role: "I spent so much of this shoot thinking I would come off as a fool, that nobody would buy me as this and it wouldn't be believable." Many critics nonetheless noted her character as a highlight of the show. Entertainment Weekly titled its review of Godless "Merritt Wever rides tall in Netflix's Godless" and wrote that "no one is more electric than the always extraordinary Merritt Wever". In 2018, she won an Emmy for the role.

In 2019, Wever starred in another Netflix miniseries, Unbelievable, which was released on September 13, 2019. The series received critical acclaim, with Wever receiving her first Golden Globe Awards nomination for Best Actress – Miniseries or Television Film.

In 2020, Wever starred opposite Domhnall Gleeson in the HBO comedy thriller series Run. It was cancelled after one season.

In 2025, she won an Emmy for Outstanding Guest Actress in a Drama Series for her portrayal of Gretchen George in season 2 of Severance.

== Acting credits ==
=== Film ===
Year	Title	Role	Notes
1997	Alaska	April	Short film
1998	All I Wanna Do	Maureen 'Momo' Haines	
1998	Arresting Gena	Tammy	
1999	The Adventures of Sebastian Cole	Susan	
2001	Series 7: The Contenders	Lindsay Berns	
2002	Signs	Tracey Abernathy	
2003	Season of Youth	Anna	
2003	Bringing Rain	Monica Greenfield	
2004	A Hole in One	Betty	
2005	12 and Holding	Debbie Poole	
2007	Michael Clayton	Anna Kaiserson	
2007	Into the Wild	Lori	
2007	Neal Cassady	Mountain Girl	
2008	Righteous Kill	Rape Victim	
2009	Mr. Softie	Gail	
2009	The Missing Person	Mabel Page	
2009	The Messenger	Lara	
2010	Greenberg	Gina	
2010	Tiny Furniture	Frankie	
2011	The Strange Ones	Hotel Girl	Short film
2014	Birdman or (The Unexpected Virtue of Ignorance)	Annie	
2015	Meadowland	Kelly	
2016	The Last Face	Marlee	
2018	Irreplaceable You	Mindy	
2018	Charlie Says	Karlene Faith	
2018	Welcome to Marwen	Roberta	
2019	Marriage Story	Cassie	
2022	Midday Black Midnight Blue	Beth	
2023	Memory	Olivia	
2025	Christy	Joyce Salters	
2026	Primetime	Andie Bender	
2027	The Great Beyond †	TBA	Post-production

Key
†	Denotes films that have not yet been released

=== Television ===
Year	Title	Role	Notes
1995	Blue River	Lottie Howland	Television film
1997	Law & Order	Myra	Episode: "Mad Dog"
2002	Law & Order	Jennifer Taylor	Episode: "American Jihad"
2002	Law & Order: Criminal Intent	Hannah Price	Episode: "Tomorrow"
2003	The Wire	Prissy	2 episodes: "Storm Warnings" and "Bad Dreams"
2004	Something the Lord Made	Mrs. Francis Saxon	Television film
2005	Quarterlife	Bailey	Television film
2005	Law & Order	Sunshine Porter	Episode: "Sects"
2005	NCIS	Wendy Smith	Episode: "Switch"
2006	Conviction	Bridget Kellner	Episode: "Pilot"
2006–2007	Studio 60 on the Sunset Strip	Suzanne	12 episodes
2009–2015	Nurse Jackie	Zoey Barkow	Main role
2012	The Good Wife	Aubrey Gardner	Episode: "After the Fall"
2013	New Girl	Elizabeth	7 episodes
2013	Remember Sunday	Lucy Gillenwater	Television film
2015–2016	The Walking Dead	Dr. Denise Cloyd	9 episodes
2017	Godless	Mary Agnes McNue	Main role
2019	Unbelievable	Detective Karen Duvall	Main role
2020	Run	Ruby Richardson	Main role
2021	Robot Chicken	Mandy, Susan the Tauntaun (voices)	Episode: "May Cause the Exact Thing You're Taking This to Avoid"
2022	Roar	Elisa	Episode: "The Woman Who Was Fed by a Duck"
2023	Tiny Beautiful Things	Frances "Frankie" Pierce	7 episodes
2025	Severance	Gretchen George	5 episodes
2025	The Bombing of Pan Am 103	Kathryn Turman	4 episodes
2025	The Gilded Age	Monica O'Brien	Episode: "Marriage Is a Gamble"

=== Theater ===
Year	Title	Role	Playwright	Venue	Ref.
2003	Cavedweller	Cissy Pritchard	Kate Moira Ryan	New York Theatre Workshop, Off-Broadway	
2006	What When	Sallie	Rinne Groff	The Ohio Theater, Off-Broadway	
2010	The Female of the Species	Molly Rivers	Joanna Murray-Smith	Geffen Playhouse, Los Angeles	
2011	The Illusion	Elicia / Lyse / Clarina	Tony Kushner	Peter Norton Space, Off-Broadway	
2011	Touch(ed)	Emma	Bess Wohl	Williamstown Theater Festival, Massachusetts	
2012	Uncle Vanya	Sonya	Anton Chekov	Soho Rep, Off-Broadway	
2015	The Nether	Morris	Jennifer Haley	Lucille Lortel Theater, Off-Broadway	

== Awards and nominations ==
Organizations	Year	Category	Work	Result	Ref.
Actor Awards	2013	Outstanding Ensemble in a Comedy Series	Nurse Jackie	Nominated	
Critics' Choice Television Awards	2014	Best Supporting Actress in a Comedy Series	Nurse Jackie	Nominated	
Critics' Choice Television Awards	2019	Best Actress in a Movie/Miniseries	Unbelievable	Nominated	
Gotham Independent Film Awards	2010	Best Ensemble Performance	Tiny Furniture	Nominated	
Golden Globe Awards	2019	Best Actress – Miniseries or Television Film	Unbelievable	Nominated	
Independent Spirit Awards	2020	Robert Altman Award	Marriage Story	Won	
Primetime Emmy Awards	2012	Outstanding Supporting Actress in a Comedy Series	Nurse Jackie (Episode: "One-Armed Jacks")	Nominated	
Primetime Emmy Awards	2013	Outstanding Supporting Actress in a Comedy Series	Nurse Jackie (Episode: "Teachable Moments")	Won	
Primetime Emmy Awards	2018	Outstanding Supporting Actress in a Limited Series or Movie	Godless	Won	
Primetime Emmy Awards	2023	Outstanding Supporting Actress in a Limited Series or Movie	Tiny Beautiful Things	Nominated	
Primetime Emmy Awards	2025	Outstanding Guest Actress in a Drama Series	Severance (Episode: "Who Is Alive?")	Won	
Primetime Emmy Awards	2026	Outstanding Guest Actress in a Drama Series	The Gilded Age (Episode: "Marriage is a Gamble" )	Nominated	
Satellite Awards	2014	Best Supporting Actress – Series, Miniseries or Television Film	Nurse Jackie	Nominated	
TCA Awards	2019	Individual Achievement in Drama	Unbelievable	Nominated	
Washington D.C. Area Film Critics Association	2014	Best Ensemble	Birdman	Won	
