= Thank You (The Walking Dead) =

- The Walking Dead episode
- Glenn and Nicholas find themselves surrounded by an incoming herd of walkers.
- Episode no.: Season 6 Episode 3
- Directed by: Michael Slovis
- Written by: Angela Kang
- Cinematography by: Michael E. Satrazemis
- Editing by: Evan Schrodek
- Original air date: October 25, 2015
- Running time: 43 minutes

Guest appearances
- Corey Hawkins as Heath; Jason Douglas as Tobin; Kenric Green as Scott; Justin Miles as Barnes; Jesse Boyd as Edward; Jay Huguley as David; Beth Keener as Annie; Jonathan Kleitman as Sturgess; Michael Traynor as Nicholas

Episode chronology
← Previous "JSS"	Next → "Here's Not Here"
- The Walking Dead season 6

"Thank You" is the third episode of the sixth season of the post-apocalyptic horror television series The Walking Dead, which aired on AMC on October 25, 2015. The episode was written by Angela Kang and directed by Michael Slovis.

The episode takes place directly after the ending of the season premiere, and is shown from the perspective of survivors dealing with an incoming herd coming in their direction, primarily focusing on Glenn Rhee and Michonne.

This episode marks the death and final regular appearance of recurring character, Nicholas (Michael Traynor). The indefinite fate of Glenn was highlighted by several critics.

== Plot ==
Rick, Glenn, Michonne and others race toward Alexandria as the horn draws the rear half of the walker parade toward the town. Rick orders Daryl to continue leading the rest of the herd away from Alexandria, as part of his plan. When the horn stops, Rick decides to circle back for an RV, improvising to draw the breakaway herd back to the route he'd planned. He instructs Glenn and Michonne to lead the group back home, to not stop or fight anything on their way, and to keep moving. He tells them to try to save everyone, but if they cannot, leave some behind to ensure that they keep moving; this is overheard by Heath. While Rick has stopped the group to give these instructions, however, Barnes is caught by a walker and killed. Daryl ignores Rick's plan and leaves Abraham and Sasha to lead the herd by themselves.

Michonne and Glenn's group suffer attrition as Annie twists her ankle, and in a fight with walkers, David is bitten in the shoulder, whilst Sturgess panics and shoots Scott in the leg before running off. Though slowed by two wounded and encountering additional walkers, Michonne and Glenn refuse to leave anyone behind despite Rick's orders. The group finds Sturgess' hat. Barely keeping it together, Nicholas leads them through familiar territory to shelter in a pet store, finding Sturgess' dead body being devoured by a group of walkers along the way. Glenn devises a plan to light one of the buildings on fire to distract the undead, and Nicholas offers to lead him to a feed store. Annie and Scott suggest they be left behind, but Heath insists otherwise and glares at Michonne. When Michonne confronts Heath about his attitude, the latter tells her that he overheard what Rick said, while the former counters by saying they have not left anyone behind and defends Rick's brutal attitude by telling Heath that he has not experienced what Rick has. Newlywed David, knowing he is going to die, writes a farewell note to his wife Betsy, but Michonne refuses to carry it for him and assures him that he can make it home for a final goodbye.

Michonne dispatches two walkers that were hidden inside the pet store, the noise from which draws the herd to their location. They are forced to flee, though without Glenn and Nicholas they don't have enough able-bodied people to help the injured. Annie trips on an improvised crutch and falls, urging the others to run moments before she is devoured by walkers. David is eaten alive against a gate, dropping his note to Betsy. Michonne is saved by Heath and barely survives. Michonne and Heath, carrying Scott between them, manage to escape the town and arrive in Alexandria which they find has been attacked. Glenn and Nicholas discover the feed store had already been burned down. Nicholas tries to lead them away but they find themselves surrounded and trapped in a dead end, where they desperately climb a dumpster to avoid the clutches of the walkers. Nicholas calms himself and thanks Glenn before shooting himself in the head. Glenn falls with him into the mass of walkers, screaming in anguish as bloody viscera are torn apart.

Rick arrives at the RV, which he drives to another location in hopes of single-handedly intercepting the herd and salvaging his failed plan. He radios Daryl with his intentions, but he is ambushed by the Wolves that Morgan had convinced to flee Alexandria. Rick kills all five Wolves while finding one of them had a jar of baby food from Alexandria. As walkers approach, Rick is unable to start the shot-up RV which becomes surrounded by an increasing number of walkers.

== Production ==
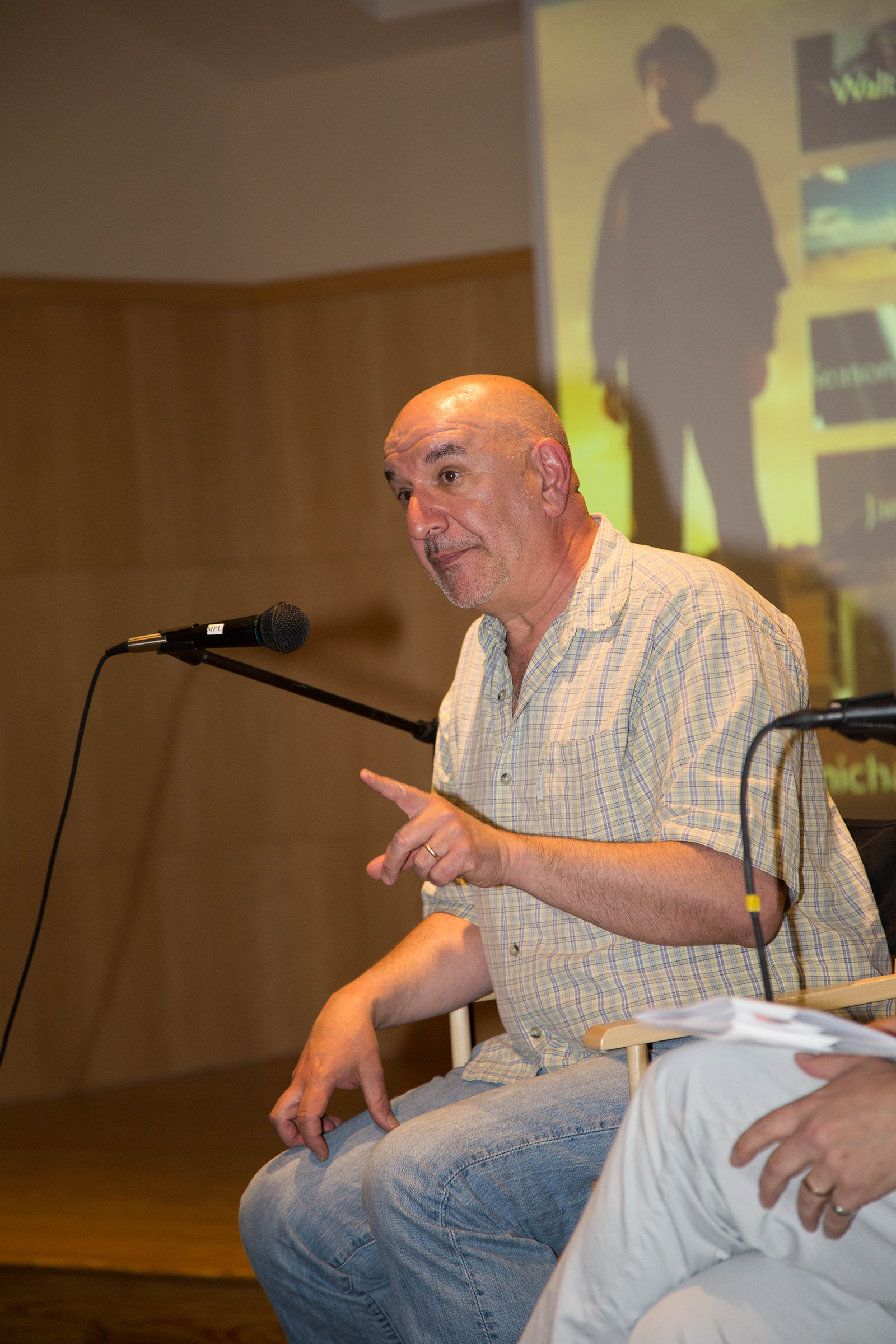
Michael Slovis directed the episode.

The episode was directed by Michael Slovis and written by Angela Kang. It features guest appearances from Corey Hawkins as Heath, Michael Traynor as Nicholas, Kenric Green as Scott, Beth Keener as Annie and Justin Miles as Barnes. Despite being credited, Lauren Cohan, Chandler Riggs, Melissa McBride, Lennie James, Josh McDermitt, Christian Serratos, Alanna Masterson, Seth Gilliam, Ross Marquand, Alexandra Breckenridge, Austin Nichols and Tovah Feldshuh do not appear in the episode. The episode features only six series regulars.

=== Fate of Glenn Rhee ===
After the airing of the episode, Glenn's supposed death drew much critical attention, with several critics speculating whether he was indeed dead or not. Showrunner Scott M. Gimple made the statement, "We will see Glenn, some version of Glenn or parts of Glenn, again, either in flashback or in the current timeline. We will complete the story. That's the important thing." Photos from set of the second half of Season 6 showed Steven Yeun on set in costume, further alluding to the possibility of Glenn's survival.

== Reception ==
=== Critical reception ===
The episode received critical acclaim and reviewers highlighted the fate of Glenn Rhee in particular, leading to speculation that he had survived the episode. It earned a 97% rating with an average score of 8.5 out of 10 on Rotten Tomatoes, whose consensus reads: "'Thank You' is an example of what The Walking Dead does best, combining gripping action with troubling existential questions in a heart-wrenching plot twist."

Steve Wright for SciFi Now assessed that the sixth season is a "step in quality" from the previous one and "one thing it has been missing is an 'Oh my god, I can't believe that just happened!' moment... Well, the wait is officially over." Jeremy Egner for The New York Times praised Michael Slovis and said: "The scene on the Dumpster was a stunner, the various components - performance, makeup, sound, direction - coalescing into a woozy, terrifying sequence that ranks with the series's best".

=== Ratings ===
The episode averaged a 6.8 rating in adults 18-49 and 13.1 million viewers overall, a rise from the previous episode.
