= Ann Mahoney =

American actress (born 1976)

- Born: April 24, 1976 (age 50); Rochester, New York, U.S.
- Occupation: Actress
- Years active: since 1999
- Website: ann-mahoney.com

Ann Mahoney (born April 24, 1976) is an American television and film actress who played Olivia in the TV series The Walking Dead.

== Biography ==
Born in Rochester, New York, Mahoney moved with her family at the age of two to New Orleans, Louisiana, when her father was accepted to teach at Loyola University. She attended Riverdale High School and went on to take theater studies at Greensboro College and University of Connecticut, where she obtained a master's degree. Mahoney teaches in New Orleans at Loyola University.

Mahoney's portrayed Olivia on The Walking Dead, Beth on Rectify, and Gladys Presley on the 2017 TV miniseries Sun Records.

== Filmography ==
=== Film ===
Year	Title	Role	Notes
2006	Big Momma's House 2	Lisa's Coach	
2007	Flakes	Astrid	Uncredited
2007	A Dance for Bethany	Sarah	
2011	The Pool Boys	Marlene	Uncredited
2012	King	Ms. Pierce	
2013	Hateship, Loveship	Frostop Waitress	Uncredited
2013	The Bridge	Allison Antonich	
2014	Barefoot	Rita Walachowski	
2014	99 Homes	Mrs. Tanner	
2015	Socialwerk	Sloan Millicent Sharpe	Short film; also producer and writer
2016	Midnight Special	FBI Agent #1	
2016	Bad Moms	Mousey Mom	
2017	Logan Lucky	Gleema Perdue	
2017	Same Kind of Different as Me	Clara	
2018	Assassination Nation	Mom in Supermarket	
2018	Breasts	Leslie	Short film
2018	Dumplin'	Millie's Mother	
2019	Facing Life	Gloria	Short film
2019	The True Don Quixote	Janelle	
2020	The Other Side of Night	Mel	Short film
2021	Charming the Hearts of Men	Teresa	
2023	We Have a Ghost	H&R Block Woman	
2025	Five Nights at Freddy's 2 (film)	Margaret	

=== Television ===
Year	Title	Role	Notes
2004	Torn Apart	Nurse	Television film
2004	Frankenstein	Jenna	Television film
2004	The Madam's Family: The Truth About the Canal Street Brothel	Young Mother	Television film
2004	Searching for David's Heart	Mrs. Kerns	Television film
2005	Odd Girl Out	Bartender	Television film
2005	Pizza My Heart	Pestolani Cousin	Television film
2005	Snow Wonder	Brenda Wyatt	Television film
2006	Scarlett	Anita	Television film
2006	Hello Sister, Goodbye Life	Waitress	Television film
2006	Thief	Flo	Television mini-series
2006	Not Like Everyone Else	Mrs. Carroll	Television film
2011	Hart of Dixie	Mabel	Episode: "Pilot"
2014–2015	Rectify	Beth	Recurring role; 3 episodes
2015–2016	The Walking Dead	Olivia	Recurring role (seasons 5–7); 12 episodes
2017	Sun Records	Gladys Presley	Television mini-series
2018	The Good Cop	Phyllis	Episode: "Will Cora Get Married?"
2019	On Becoming a God in Central Florida	Caftan Mom	Episode: "Manifest Destinee"
2020	Stolen in Plain Sight	Kaylene	Television film
2022	The Thing About Pam	Tammy	Television mini-series
2023	National Treasure: Edge of History	Alamo Expert	Episode: "Point of No Return"
2023	Suitable Flesh	Susan	Television film
