= Major Dodson =

American actor (born 2003)

- Born: July 8, 2003 (age 22); Dallas, Texas, U.S.
- Occupation: Actor
- Years active: 2010–present

Major Dodson (born July 8, 2003) is an American actor, known for his roles on The Walking Dead, American Horror Story, and Left Behind.

== Career ==
Dodson began acting professionally at the age of six; he acted in various minor roles before his first major television appearance on Revolution as young Danny Matheson. His most notable roles are as Corey on American Horror Story and Sam on The Walking Dead.

== Charity ==
Dodson is actively involved in Smiles for the Homeless, a charity his family helped create that makes care packages for homeless individuals.

== Personal life ==
Dodson is autistic and has advocated for more opportunities for actors with autism to portray autistic characters.

Dodson confirmed in an Instagram post that he is in a relationship.

== Filmography ==
=== Film ===
Year	Film	Role	Notes
2011	Alfred Thinks We're Aliens	Alfred	Short film
2011	Don't Cry Daddy	Carolyn's Son	Short film
2012	Departure	Young Boy	Short film
2014	Left Behind	Raymie Steele	
2015	Dermaphoria	Young Eric	
2016	Proud Souls	Johnny	
2022	Tyson's Run	Tyson	

=== Television ===
Year	Series	Role	Notes
2010	Sons of the Brotherhood	Tyler	Episode: "Tea Time with Olivia"
2010	Sons of the Brotherhood	Tyler	Episode: "Tea Time with Olivia"
2011	Mystery Diagnosis	Harry	Episode: "Too Young to be Sick"
2013	Revolution	Danny Matheson (age 8)	Episode: "The Stand"
2014	American Horror Story	Corey Bachman	4 episodes
2015–2016	The Walking Dead	Sam Anderson	10 episodes

=== Video games ===
Year	Game	Role	Notes
2020	Final Fantasy VII Remake	Cloud Strife (age 14)	Flashbacks

== Awards and nominations ==
Year	Award	Category	Work	Result
2016	Young Artist Awards	Best Performance in a TV Series - Recurring Young Actor (13 and Under)	The Walking Dead	Nominated
