= The Distance (The Walking Dead) =

- The Walking Dead episode
- On the journey to Aaron's community, Alexandria, Michonne and Glenn find themselves endangered as a swarm of walkers attack them.
- Episode no.: Season 5 Episode 11
- Directed by: Larysa Kondracki
- Written by: Seth Hoffman
- Cinematography by: Michael E. Satrazemis
- Editing by: Dan Liu
- Original air date: February 22, 2015

Guest appearances
- Tyler James Williams as Noah; Ross Marquand as Aaron; Jordan Woods-Robinson as Eric Raleigh

Episode chronology
← Previous "Them"	Next → "Remember"
- The Walking Dead season 5

"The Distance" is the eleventh episode of the fifth season of the post-apocalyptic horror television series The Walking Dead, which aired on AMC on February 22, 2015. The episode was written by Seth Hoffman, in his fifth writing credit for the series, and directed by Larysa Kondracki. This episode marks the first appearance of the Alexandria Safe-Zone, a prominent location in the comic book series of the same name. It also features the first appearance of Eric, a recruiter for Alexandria and Aaron's boyfriend.

The episode focuses on the group's being introduced to Aaron, who promises the group would be valuable additions to his community, although his encouraging and optimistic outlook convince the group that he is a threat. Michonne strives for a safe haven and believes in the opportunity Aaron's community offers. The group take a different route than expected for safety precautions, which in turn causes multiple dangerous threats along their journey.

Overall, the episode was critically acclaimed, with many praising aspects such as the action and sense of urgency, as well as the change of tone in comparison to previous episodes demonstrating hope for the characters and moving the story in a new direction.

== Plot ==
Maggie and Sasha return to the barn and introduce Aaron to Rick and the group. Aaron tells them he is part of a larger community surrounded by reinforced steel walls that provide protection from intruders and "roamers", and after observing the group believes they would make trustworthy additions to his community. Rick, however, doesn't trust Aaron and knocks him unconscious before tying him to a wooden column. A search of Aaron's pack reveals, among other things, a flare gun, suggesting there are others nearby.

When later pressed by Rick, Aaron reveals he has one partner who is hiding some distance from the group. He provides Rick with directions to two waiting vehicles, which are to transport Rick's group to the community. Rick is unwilling to trust him, but Michonne insists they must investigate the possibility of a new home, and Glenn agrees. Maggie, Abraham, and Rosita also go to see if the vehicles are in fact there, while the rest of the group watch for an attack on the barn. While alone with Rick, Aaron explains that he worked for an NGO delivering food and medicine to communities on the Niger River delta, and "bad guys" often threatened him — but he doesn't believe Rick is a bad guy. Glenn questions why Aaron would want people who have done what the group has done to join him, but Michonne points out that the group has taken in people like Father Gabriel, Tara, and herself. They find a car and an RV for transport, as Aaron said.

When everyone reconvenes, Michonne declares that since Aaron appears genuine, they will join the community; no one disagrees. Aaron says he will take them the next morning, but he refuses to reveal the camp's location in order to protect its inhabitants. Instead, Aaron says they'll take Highway 16 and provide further directions as they travel. However, Rick decides against that and declares they will travel via Highway 23 that night. Aaron protests, saying that his people haven't yet cleared that road, but Rick is adamant. Michonne questions whether Rick actually intends to join the camp. Rick responds that it is a struggle to believe anywhere is safe for his family, he will make a decision when he is outside the walls.

Rick, Michonne, Glenn, and Aaron take the lead in the car, while the rest of the group follow a short distance behind in the RV. On the way, Michonne is looking at the pictures that Aaron has given her and she asks him why he has no pictures of his people. He says that he did take one picture but that he had got the exposure wrong and it didn't develop. Michonne asks Rick if he has given Aaron their own audition interview. Aaron answers that he has killed "lots" of walkers, but only two people, and only then because they were trying to kill him. At that point Rick then finds a parabolic microphone in the car and expresses concern that Aaron's people might have heard their plans. Rick's outburst distracts Glenn, who drives into a herd of walkers on the dark, unscouted highway. Coming out the other side, they lose sight of the RV and conclude it backed away from the herd. After the car fails to start, they see a flare go off and Aaron bolts into the woods, pursued by Glenn. After close calls for each, Glenn cuts Aaron free and returns his pistol, and together they return to the car to save Rick and Michonne from the herd. The four of them head for the flare and reunite with the RV group who have rescued Aaron's partner and boyfriend, Eric (Jordan Woods-Robinson).

Relieved that Rick's group saved Eric, Aaron reveals the community is located in Alexandria, Virginia, and Glenn urges Rick to trust Aaron. The group hits the road in the morning. Michonne cautions Rick to allow himself to stop fighting; he slips away to hide a gun in the woods. Pulling up to the community walls, Rick hears the sound of children playing. Believing that Aaron is telling the truth and the community is safe, the group leaves the vehicles and heads to the gates.

== Reception ==
Although Aaron and Eric are boyfriends in the comic series, many viewers were still surprised due to the same-sex kiss the two shared in the episode.

Upon airing, the episode was watched by 13.44 million American viewers with an 18-49 rating of 6.9, an increase in viewership from the previous episode which had 12.27 million viewers and an 18-49 rating of 6.2.

In New Zealand, the episode was watched by 150,020 viewers. The Australian broadcast was the most-watched on pay television that day, with 85,000 viewers. The UK broadcast was the second most-watched on the network that month, with 1.13 million viewers.
