= Carol Peletier =

Fictional character in The Walking Dead

Carol
- The Walking Dead character
- Carol, as she appears in the comic book series (left) and as portrayed by Melissa McBride in the television series (right).
- First appearance: Comic: "Issue #3" (2003); Television: "Tell It to the Frogs" (2010)
- Last appearance: Comic: "Issue #42" (2007)
- Created by: Robert Kirkman; Tony Moore
- Adapted by: Frank Darabont; Charles H. Eglee; Jack LoGiudice
- Portrayed by: Melissa McBride
- Voiced by: Melissa McBride (Onslaught)

In-universe information
- Occupation: Former Leader of the Saviors; Former Co-Leader of the Kingdom; Former Ship Captain; Former Baker for the Commonwealth; Director of Operations for the Commonwealth
- Weapon: Knuckle Knife; Bow and Arrow
- Family: Comic: Andrea Grimes (granddaughter); Carl Grimes (son-in-law)
- Spouses: Television: Ed Peletier (named only in the television series); King Ezekiel (ex-husband)
- Significant others: Comic: Tyreese; Billy Greene; Television: Tobin
- Children: Sophia Peletier (daughter); Television: Lizzie and Mika Samuels (adopted daughters); Henry Sutton (adopted son); Judith Grimes (adopted niece); R.J. Grimes (adopted nephew)

Carol (full name in the television series: Carol Peletier) (/ˈpɛltieɪ/) is a fictional character from the comic book series The Walking Dead, and the television series of the same name, where she is portrayed by Melissa McBride. Carol is introduced in the third issue of the comic's first volume, "Days Gone Bye", and the third episode of the first season of the television series, as a meek housewife and mother of Sophia at the survival camp in Atlanta, Georgia. Her arc in the television series was described as a "hero's journey" by executive producer Scott M. Gimple, having made many difficult decisions in order to survive.

The direction of her character is contrasted between the two mediums. In the comic series, Carol is a 25-year-old housewife who exhibits a neurotic, self-centered, and naive demeanor. Throughout her arc, she grows increasingly unstable, to the extent of self-destruction, and ultimately commits suicide. In the television show, she is shown to be a stern, pragmatic and compassionate individual who has been gradually building inner strength, becoming much more capable and emotionally stable than her comic book counterpart. The abuse she suffered from her husband was explicitly shown in the television series, whereas it was hinted at in the comics. In addition, Carol and Tyreese have a brief romantic relationship in the comics before they break up and Carol commits suicide.

In the television series, Carol evacuates her home with her abusive husband Ed and her daughter Sophia in hopes of a safe haven in Atlanta, where they join a camp of survivors. Following the deaths of her husband and daughter, Carol forms a close bond with camp survivor Daryl Dixon. After the prison falls, she becomes the adoptive mother to Lizzie and Mika Samuels. The trio meet up with Tyreese and find safety together, when the mentally unwell child Lizzie murders her sister in a psychotic delusion, forcing Carol to make another challenging decision. Carol saves the rest of Rick's group from the cannibals at Terminus. After arriving at the Alexandria Safe-Zone, Carol becomes one of its key defenders and attempts a relationship with a resident named Tobin, but quickly realizes Tobin is only a bandaid on her pain. She begins to feel the guilt of those she has killed and becomes suicidal, until saved by Morgan and brought to the Kingdom led by King Ezekiel. She eventually marries Ezekiel and adopts a young Kingdom resident named Henry.

Initially a recurring cast member, McBride was upgraded to a series regular at the onset of the second season, and the character's role predominantly increased since the fourth season. McBride became second-billed as of the final three episodes of the tenth season. Carol is one of the last original survivors, along with Rick and Daryl. She is also the series' longest-living female character, and the only female character to have appeared in every season. Carol and Daryl are the only characters that have been in the series since the first season.

McBride's performance as Carol has received critical acclaim from television commentators, and some critics have referred to Carol as the series' best character. In September 2020, it was announced that McBride and Norman Reedus (Daryl) would headline their own spin-off series, scheduled to premiere in 2023. However, McBride exited the project prior to filming. In October 2023, McBride reprised her role as Carol in the first season finale of The Walking Dead: Daryl Dixon, and that she would return as a series regular in the second season, subtitled The Book of Carol, which premiered in September 2024.

== Appearances ==
=== Comic book series ===
==== Early storylines (2003–2004) ====
Carol is described in the comics as being a housewife who occasionally helps pay the family's bills by selling Tupperware out of catalogues to friends and neighbors. She endured a rather unsatisfactory marriage, and it is implied that she only married (and continued to stay with) her husband because of her frequent need for attention and comfort. During the initial stages of the outbreak, her husband commits suicide after losing his parents to walkers, leaving Carol and their daughter Sophia to fend for themselves. Carol is in the process of moving herself and Sophia to her sister's in Atlanta when they meet and eventually join Shane's settlement of survivors on the outskirts of the city.

While in the camp, she usually assists the other mothers in domestic duties such as washing clothes and looking after the children. She and Lori quickly become best friends, the two of them often conversing about the current happenings around them. Carol is often Lori's shoulder to cry on, as well as the one person to whom she can vent about her various frustrations.

After leaving their first campsite, they meet Tyreese, whom Carol grows to like. Eventually, the two became romantically attached to one another, and they stay close throughout their stay at Hershel's farm and their arrival at the abandoned prison.

==== Prison arc (2005–2007) ====
Tension begins between Tyreese and Carol, however, when Michonne is introduced, and Carol later witnesses Michonne performing oral sex on Tyreese inside of the prison gymnasium. This initially leads her to try to compete, albeit degradingly, for his affection but she ultimately breaks off the relationship and tries avoiding further confrontations.

Soon after the break-up, her mental health comes into question, and, after nights of crying, results in a suicide attempt. Soon after cutting herself, Carol becomes desperate for companionship and wants to have a polyamorous relationship with Rick and Lori, only to be turned down.

As she plans to commit suicide, she makes sure Lori promises to take care of Sophia. She then initiates sex with Hershel's son, Billy. After wandering through the prison courtyard and talking to a zombie, she allows it to tear at her jugular. She refuses for anyone to try to help her, saying that they should let her die in peace. She is killed by a merciful Andrea during her reanimation process before she can bite a saddened Tyreese.

Carol's death leaves a significant mark on the group in the days leading up to the ultimate assault on the prison. Many look down upon her manner of death and are disgusted by the fact that she abandoned her only living family. Sophia is left in a catatonic state as the news reaches her, and has since attempted to repress all memories of Carol by pretending that Maggie and Glenn are her biological parents. Maggie is relieved when Sophia begins to speak openly about recognizing Carol's previous existence. At the Hilltop Colony with Carl Grimes, Sophia reminisces on life at the prison with her mother, reminding him that she remembers everything that has happened to them, especially the death of her mother.

=== Television series ===
Before the apocalypse began, Carol was a meek and abused housewife. She frequently avoided confrontation with her husband Ed in attempt to stifle his anger, though she secretly prayed to God that he be punished for abusing her and for his sexual interest in their young daughter Sophia (Madison Lintz). The Peletiers first met up with Shane (Jon Bernthal), Lori (Sarah Wayne Callies) and her son Carl (Chandler Riggs) while traveling toward a supposed 'safe zone' in Atlanta, and they all eventually settled near a quarry on the outskirts of Atlanta with a handful of other survivors. Within her time at the camp, she regularly performed domestic duties such as washing and ironing clothes for her and her fellow survivors, usually with help from some of the other women in the group.

==== Season 1 ====
Carol debuts in the episode "Tell It to the Frogs", where she is shown washing clothes in the stream with the other women in the group. When Carol's husband, Ed, hears the women talking and laughing, he tells his wife to focus on her work. When Andrea (Laurie Holden) tells him off, Ed quickly becomes threatening as the women confront him about Carol's bruises. Ed then strikes Carol, causing a feud, which ends when Shane furiously beats him as Carol pleads for him to stop. In the episode "Vatos", after Ed's violent abuse has been exposed to the camp, Carol begins to stand up for herself regarding Sophia; she dismisses the idea of Sophia staying with her father in his tent, insisting that she wants to join in with the rest of the camp. Ed is killed during a walker attack and Sophia and Carol are left fearing for their lives. In the episode "Wildfire", while the group cleans up the camp in preparation to leave, Carol destroys Ed's corpse with a pickaxe, venting the inner rage she had toward him and his years of violent abuse. In the season finale "TS-19", the group takes shelter at the Centers for Disease Control (CDC), but they soon discover the facility is set to explode after the power runs out. Carol hands Rick a grenade (which Rick had picked up in the tank he was trapped in) to blow out one of the front windows so they can escape. Carol and Sophia run to the vehicles in the street with the others, while Jacqui and Dr. Jenner choose to remain at the CDC to die.

==== Season 2 ====
In the season premiere "What Lies Ahead", walkers swarm the highway and Sophia is lost in the woods after being chased by them. Carol casts the blame upon Rick for not staying with her, but ultimately blames herself. In the episode "Cherokee Rose" Daryl Dixon (Norman Reedus) gives Carol a flower, which inspires hope in her to stay strong and believe in Sophia's survival. In the episode "Chupacabra", while staying at the farm owned by Hershel Greene (Scott Wilson), she decides to cook with Lori for Hershel and the rest of the group as a token of gratitude. During the dinner, she brings a plate to Daryl and kisses him on the cheek, acknowledging how noble and caring he is (compared to her deceased husband). In the mid-season finale "Pretty Much Dead Already", Carol and Daryl begin to form a deeper bond, and she shows concern for his well-being. Glenn reveals to the group that Hershel's barn is full of walkers and they discover, to their horror, that Sophia is one of them. In the mid-season premiere "Nebraska", Carol refuses to attend Sophia's memorial service, saying that her daughter died a long time ago and the corpse at the farm was not Sophia. In the episode "Triggerfinger", Carol shows a conscious concern for Daryl's detachment from the group. She later lets him vent his frustration at her; at first he mocks her for losing her family but soon apologizes and returns to the fold. Over time, Carol's gains self-confidence. She grows tired of the arguments of the group, and refuses to choose the fate of their prisoner, Randall, in the episode "Judge, Jury, Executioner." In the season finale "Beside the Dying Fire", the group are chased off the farm by walkers. Carol convinces the women to evacuate the farmhouse but is herself abandoned by Lori. Daryl rescues Carol on his motorcycle, and they eventually meet up with the remaining survivors. The slight blame she has cast upon Rick develops into outright questioning of his leadership.

==== Season 3 ====
In the season premiere, "Seed", eight months pass and Carol has built self-confidence and has developed a proficiency with weapons. Carol has gotten closer to Lori since her pregnancy, and her trust in Rick has been regained. In the episode "Killer Within", T-Dog sacrifices himself to save Carol after they are separated when walkers get into the prison. The group believe her to be dead. In the episode "Hounded", Daryl rediscovers her in a solitary confinement cell, malnourished and weak but alive. He carries her off in his arms and in the next episode, "When the Dead Come Knocking", the group happily reunites with her; however, things once again take a sad turn when she realizes that Lori has died in childbirth. She and Rick tearfully mourn Lori's loss and Carol is seen taking care of Lori's child, Judith, while Daryl leaves for Woodbury. As Daryl tells Carol to keep safe, she responds saying, "Nine lives, remember?". In the episode "The Suicide King", Carol is sad about Daryl leaving with his brother but understands his decision. In the episode "Home", Axel is shot in front of Carol's face by The Governor's men as they bond, causing her to use his body as a shield. In the episode "I Ain't a Judas", Daryl returns, pleasing Carol. Andrea also visits, and Carol instructs Andrea to stab The Governor in his sleep to end the conflict. In the episode "This Sorrowful Life", Merle has a brief conversation with Carol wherein he remarks that she has transformed from a "scared little mouse afraid of her own shadow" into a stronger person. She replies that she was not scared of her own shadow but that of her husband and further states that she is no longer afraid of anything. To prove it, she sternly admonishes Merle to "pick a side", referring to his previous loyalty to The Governor. In the season finale "Welcome to the Tombs", Merle's dies at the hands of The Governor. Carol praises Merle for sacrificing himself to give them a chance, though Daryl remarks that Merle had never performed an altruistic deed in his life. Carol then helps defend the gate against walkers as Rick, Daryl, and Michonne drive out to carry the fight to Woodbury. At the end of the episode, as she watches the remaining Woodbury residents enter their new home in the prison, Carol is seen beginning to cry when she realizes Andrea has died.

==== Season 4 ====
In the season premiere, "30 Days Without an Accident", six months has passed since the conflict with the Governor has ended. Carol begins secretly teaching the children of the prison to have no sympathy for the walkers, as well as how to use knives to defend themselves. Carl Grimes discovers the lessons are taking place, and she asks him not to tell his father. In the episode, "Infected", Carol begins caring for two girls, Lizzie (Brighton Sharbino) and Mika (Kyla Kenedy), after killing their father, Ryan, who was bitten by a walker. This makes Carol even more determined to keep those she cares about safe. In the episode "Isolation", when a new disease starts spreading in the prison, two people who are infected are killed – Karen (Melissa Ponzio), the Woodbury survivor and girlfriend of Tyreese (Chad L. Coleman), and prison newcomer David. Unknown to the other survivors, Carol killed them in their sleep and burned their bodies, believing it would stop the infection from spreading. Tyreese is enraged when he discovers the burned bodies and attacks Rick while Carol watches, and later demands that Rick find the killer. Despite the deaths of Karen and David, the infection continues to spread. Carol discovers Lizzie is ill, but reassures her that she will be fine. Tyreese asks Carol to look after his sister, Sasha (Sonequa Martin-Green), who is also ill, believing Carol is a very caring person, which upsets Carol even more. Later, she is shown recklessly pumping up water despite knowing walkers are nearby, and is forced to flee as Rick shoots them down to save her. Rick soon uncovers the truth and confronts Carol over the murders. In the episode "Indifference" Rick and Carol go on a medical supply run together in order to help Hershel. Carol talks more about her past, revealing her late husband had pushed her down the stairs on at least three occasions and that she learned how to fix a dislocated shoulder because she was too afraid to go to the hospital. They discuss the murders of Karen and David and Carol explains that, at the time, she believed killing them would stop the spread of the infection and save the lives of everyone else in the prison. Rick realizes how different Carol has become and ultimately decides that she cannot return to the prison. He sees her as a threat, but is also concerned that Tyreese will kill her when he finds out that she murdered Karen. Carol is forced to accept banishment, leaving everyone she cares about behind.

In the episode "Inmates", Carol reappears unexpectedly, saving Lizzie, Mika, and Judith from a pair of Walkers in a forest. She returns the children to Tyreese and tells him that she saw the prison fall, and, after losing sight of him and the children, managed to catch up with them. Sensing that Tyreese does not know of her involvement in Karen's death, Carol makes up a story about how she did not return with Rick because she wanted to find more supplies for the group. Later, she finds a bitten man on the side of the road who gives her information about Tyreese and the children, and she tracks them as they to travel to a sanctuary named "Terminus." In the episode "The Grove", Carol and her group take a break from following the train tracks to Terminus and discover a house in the middle of a pecan grove. Carol is concerned that Mika is too gentle to survive, and that Lizzie is confused about the nature of walkers, thinking that they are still people. She continues to teach Lizzie and Mika survival skills, despite the girls remaining adamant about surviving using their own methods. Later, Carol and Tyreese return from a hunting trip to find that Lizzie has killed Mika and is about to kill Judith, believing that everyone will understand that Mika was just a changed person after reanimating as a walker. Realizing that Lizzie is too dangerous to be around other people, Carol and Tyreese discuss the girl's fate, ending with Carol executing Lizzie by shooting her in the head. Afterward, Carol confesses her role in killing Karen and David to Tyreese. Tyreese is furious, but forgives Carol for what she did, although he says he will not forget. After burying the two girls, Tyreese, Carol, and baby Judith restart their trek toward Terminus.

==== Season 5 ====
In the season premiere, "No Sanctuary", Carol and Tyreese witness a herd drawn to gunfire at Terminus and capture Martin, stopping him from setting up fireworks to divert them. Carol blows up a propane tank and infiltrates Terminus amongst the herd, enabling the imprisoned group to escape while the compound is overrun. After killing many residents, she escapes and has an emotional reunion with Daryl, Rick, and the others. Rick is overwhelmed with gratitude. Rick, Carl, and Sasha are further overjoyed when Carol leads the group back to the cabin where Tyreese is with Judith. In the episode "Strangers", Tyreese tells Carol that the others accept Carol's killing of Karen and David. Both remained scarred over the deaths of Mika and Lizzie. Rick says that he owes her everything and is apologetic about banishing her. Carol tells him, "You said I could survive. You were right." Daryl respects Carol's wishes not to speak about what happened to her during her exile and the prison downfall. Daryl tries to reassure Carol that they can start over. Carol and Daryl later drive off together in pursuit of the car that took Beth Greene (Emily Kinney). In the episode "Slabtown", Carol appears at the end of the episode when Beth watches her get wheeled into Grady Memorial Hospital after an unknown accident. The episode "Consumed" focuses on Carol's struggle and guilt over her past demons, saying she can't stand to watch the people she loves die. Carol and Daryl stay at an abandoned woman's shelter, where they find a reanimated mother and daughter, and Carol moves to kill them but Daryl insists it is unnecessary. In the morning, Carol wakes up to find Daryl outside cremating the mother and child. As she goes out to thank him, a car marked with a white cross approaches them and as they flee, Carol is hit, knocking her unconscious. She is lifted in a stretcher by two officers. In the episode "Crossed", Carol remains unconscious as Beth carries out her plan to give Carol epinephrine after the officers agree to turn the life support machines off, declaring that the resources would be wasted. Rick continues with his rescue mission, saying he owes Carol everything. In the mid-season finale "Coda", after receiving medication, Carol is seen starting to wake up while Beth and Dawn are talking. Later, when a hostage exchange is about to take place, Carol is seen being wheeled by Beth and they hold hands as they see their group. After the exchange takes place, Dawn shoots Beth in the head. Carol tries to comfort a distraught Daryl, telling him to put his gun down as they cry, and is helped by Tyreese to walk as they leave the hospital.

The group journeys to Washington, D.C. in hopes of a safe haven in "Them", set several weeks after Beth has died and several days after Tyreese's death. Carol tries to comfort a severely depressed Daryl and reassures Maggie of never giving up. In the episode "Remember", in spite of some mistrust before, the stranger Aaron (Ross Marquand) recruits Carol and the others, bringing them to his community, the Alexandria Safe-Zone. Interviewed by congresswoman and town leader Deanna Monroe (Tovah Feldshuh), Carol crafts a facade of being an inexperienced apocalyptic survivor who acted as the "den mother" to the group. She states she did laundry and gardening pre-apocalypse, and cooked for her "stupid, wonderful" husband. She expresses that she is a people person and wants to join a junior league to help others. After everyone is interviewed, she is the last to hand over her weapons to Olivia, awkwardly removing her rifle and placing it in the bin, further displaying her "weakness". The next day, Carol receives her assignment as a caretaker to cook for senior citizens and busy mothers. The night after the confrontation at the town gates, Carol discusses with Daryl and Rick that they can get comfortable but not weak. In the episode "Forget", Carol is seen outside the walls, plotting with Rick and Daryl to steal guns. When a walker comes along, she empties her clip into it to give the illusion they had gone shooting. She later steals three guns before Jessie Anderson (Alexandra Breckenridge)'s young son Sam (Major Dodson) spots her. She tells him that if he mentions it to his mother, "the monsters" will come and eat him alive as he is tied to a tree outside the walls, but if he is silent, she will give him lots of her homemade cookies. The next day she gives a gun to Rick, but Daryl refuses to take one. In the episode "Spend", Carol is visited by Sam several times, who continues to ask her for more cookies. Unable to turn away, Carol starts questioning Sam and learns of his father, Pete's (Corey Brill) abusive nature. Deeply concerned for his wellbeing, Carol goes to the Anderson home to try and talk to Sam or Jessie, but is coldly turned away by Pete, further arousing her suspicions. When Rick returns home, Carol tells him she believes that Pete is abusing Jessie and maybe Sam, and that the only way to stop it is to kill Pete. In the season finale "Conquer", Carol pays a visit to Pete with a tuna pasta bake and asks him to check on Tara, who is still wounded. When he refuses, Carol pulls a knife on him and threatens him, saying that she can get away with claiming self-defense. Later, at the town meeting, Carol is one of the people who speaks in Rick's defense. She witnesses Rick directly address the Alexandrians about how they need to change or they will die, after he shows up with a dead walker that he had killed inside the walls earlier that night. In order to demonstrate this point and advance their agenda, Carol discreetly tells Rick not to intervene when a drunken Pete shows up with Michonne's katana, which results in a fatal attack on Reg. Carol witnesses Rick's execution of Pete under Deanna's orders and is present for Daryl and Morgan (Lennie James)'s arrival.

==== Season 6 ====
In the episode "JSS", Carol is forced to drop her act as a meek housewife to defend the Alexandrians against the Wolves. She disguises herself as one of them, successfully killing many of them, but comes into conflict with Morgan's pacifist ideology. In the episode "Heads Up", Carol, Michonne, and Rick argue with Morgan over his beliefs. Later, Carol becomes suspicious of Morgan and follows him into the townhouse, leaving Judith at Jessie's house, and confronts Morgan about who he is hiding inside it. In the mid-season finale "Start to Finish", Carol fakes an injury during the herd attack and goes to kill the Wolf locked up with Denise. Morgan intervenes and bodyslams her, knocking her out. The Wolf escapes. In the mid-season premiere, "No Way Out", Carol shoots the Wolf with Denise, but is shocked when she hears the Wolf, even as he is being swarmed and eaten by walkers, echoing her calls for Denise to go and save herself. They fight off the remaining herd. In "Not Tomorrow Yet", Carol reckons she has killed over 18 people, and it weighs heavily on her. Carol later kisses Tobin, but their connection is merely Carol's attempt at a normal life. Later, she is posted outside the walls during Rick's mission to infiltrate the Saviors' outpost, but is concerned for a pregnant Maggie, who wants to go in and fight after the alarms go off. Carol and Maggie are captured by Saviors. In "The Same Boat", Carol and Maggie surrender to Paula's group and become hostages. Carol reverts to her meek facade in order to trick her captors, and is able to free herself and Maggie, who convinces Carol that instead of escaping they have to kill their captors. Though Carol has no qualms about killing to defend Maggie, she begs Paula — a formerly submissive woman who became an unrepentant killer after losing her family — to run, but is forced to impale her on a walker trap, where she dies. Carol then traps the reinforcements Paula had requested in a burning room. Daryl and the others arrive, having tracked them, and Carol has an emotional breakdown, embracing Daryl and admitting that she's not okay. In "Twice as Far", Carol is shown praying and smoking and attempting a relationship with Tobin, but it is useless. She has no feelings for him and sneaks out of Alexandria at night, leaving Tobin a note explaining that she has to be alone, that she can no longer kill, and that she can't bear to love someone if she can't protect them. In "Last Day on Earth", Morgan follows Carol's trail and finds her mentally damaged and weak. She is later found by a Savior who shoots her. She begs the Savior to kill her, but Morgan intervenes and kills the Savior, and the two are escorted away by another soldier from a different community.

==== Season 7 ====
In "The Well", Carol is brought to The Kingdom for medical treatment. She meets the leader of the community, King Ezekiel, a man who proclaims himself a true king and keeps a pet Bengal tiger named Shiva. Carol feigns amazement and surprise at her circumstances, but later admits that she thinks Ezekiel is crazy and makes plans to leave. Carol puts on her mild-mannered innocent act, but Ezekiel catches onto her, saying he is playing the same role himself as king, when he is actually a former zookeeper who saved and tamed Shiva. Morgan escorts Carol to an abandoned house outside the Kingdom where the two part amicably. In "Hearts Still Beating", Richard urges Carol to fight against the Saviors, but she declines. In "Rock in the Road", Carol bumps into Kingdom survivor Ben in the woods and gives him advice on how to sneak better. In "New Best Friends", she is found by Daryl, who had been staying at the Kingdom, and the two spend the evening catching up. When Daryl asks Carol why she left, she responds by saying that if she stayed and the Saviors hurt more people, she would have killed them and she didn't want that. When Carol asks about everyone back home, Daryl tells her that everyone is fine before bidding her a heartfelt goodbye. In "Bury Me Here", Carol suspects that there is more to the story and asks Morgan why Jesus brought Daryl and the others to the Kingdom. Morgan claims that they were seeking to build a relationship with the Kingdom. When she doubts his sincerity, he tells her she'll have to talk to Daryl (even offering to take her to Alexandria). She is later met by Morgan, Ezekiel and others who bring a wounded Benjamin to her cabin. They attempt to treat him, but Benjamin dies and Morgan storms out despite Carol's attempts to call him back. Morgan later reappears, revealing that Richard caused Benjamin's death, so he killed him. He also reveals to Carol that Negan killed Glenn, Abraham, and several others, and that Rick is seeking the Kingdom's aid to fight. Morgan claims he's going to kill them all, but Carol stops him. She then goes to Ezekiel, apologizing for his loss before declaring that it is time to fight. Ezekiel agrees. In "The First Day of the Rest of Your Life", Carol and other soldiers arrive at Alexandria to fight off the Saviors after Sasha's death.

==== Season 8 ====
In "Mercy", Carol joins The Militia, a coalition of groups banding together to fight Negan. She also helps the newly formed coalition ward off a walker attack. In "The Damned", she and Ezekiel lead their forces to a Savior pharmacy lab and overtake it, even though it alerts the Saviors to the presence. In "Monsters", they deploy their forces against a nearby Savior outpost. They are victorious, with no apparent losses, but as they revel in their victory some hiding Saviors open fire on them with heavy machine guns, killing dozens of people. In "Some Guy", Carol retaliates by killing a group of Saviors who are transporting the guns, and then helps a wounded Ezekiel escape. When a traumatized Ezekiel cannot bring himself to lead the Kingdom, Carol effectively takes over.

In "How It's Gotta Be", Carol and Jerry rescue Rick from a Savior attack, but cannot rouse Ezekiel to help them in the ensuing battle. In "Honor", Carol leads the Kingdom to temporary safety, and tries to prevent Benjamin's younger brother Henry, who wants revenge against the Saviors, from going out to battle. She is unsuccessful, however; Henry kills a Savior in cold blood, and both Carol and Ezekiel are troubled by his apparent lack of remorse. In "Still Gotta Mean Something", she goes out to look for Henry when he runs away to fight the Saviors, and refuses to give up even when it appears he has been killed. She ultimately finds him alive and saves him from a horde of walkers. In "Wrath", the season finale, she saves Henry once again when a crazed Morgan attacks him. After Rick defeats and imprisons Negan, ending the war, Carol joins the rest of the survivors in celebrating a new era of peace.

==== Season 9 ====
Carol continues to reside in the Kingdom and is in a relationship with Ezekiel. After he proposes, Carol decides to take time away from the Kingdom to be the new leader of the Sanctuary. She eventually accepts Ezekiel's proposal, but comes into conflict with the rogue Savior Jed, who briefly takes Carol hostage in an attempt to get guns. As the situation devolves, Carol decides to return to the Kingdom in "The Obliged" and leave the Saviors to their own devices. Jed leads an attack on the camp, resulting in the deaths of several people and the drawing of a massive herd in their direction. As seen in "What Come After," Carol survives the attack and is devastated by Rick's apparent death.

Six years later, in "Who Are You Now?," Carol is married to Ezekiel and raising Henry with him. With the Kingdom beginning to fall apart, Carol convinces Ezekiel to allow Henry to travel to the Hilltop in order to be apprenticed as a blacksmith. On the road, Carol and Henry are attacked by a group of former Saviors turned marauder, led by Jed and Regina. The group humiliates Carol, who refuses to fight back, and steals her wedding ring. Later that night, Carol tracks down the Saviors' camp and pours gasoline on it. After a final conversation with Jed, Carol ignites the gasoline, killing Jed, Regina, and all of the remaining Saviors. She then seeks out Daryl in "Stradivarius" to ask him to watch over Henry for her at the Hilltop. Carol doesn't let on that she witnessed Henry and Daryl fight off walkers. Henry tells Daryl that Carol considers him her best friend and is able to convince Daryl to accompany them. After Eugene goes missing, Carol refuses to let Henry join the search party.

In "Evolution," Carol, along with Tara, is rather cold towards Michonne when she first arrives. Carol later tries to convince Michonne to have Alexandria participate in a fair Ezekiel is holding as a much-needed morale boost due to the state of the Kingdom, but Michonne refuses. Carol, along with Dianne, departs for the Kingdom carrying supplies that Henry convinced Earl Sutton to send as an advance on his pay. Henry later tells Earl that he saw Carol cry for the first time in his life that day, and seeing her break down in such a way ultimately led to him making his own mistakes.

In "The Calm Before", Alpha, the leader of the Whisperers group, murders Henry, Tara, Enid, and several other residents of the Kingdom, to punish Carol and Ezekiel for entering her territory. A horrified, grief-stricken Carol discovers Henry's severed, reanimated head displayed on a pike, along with those of the other victims. In the season finale, "The Storm", she stops a guilt-ridden Lydia from committing suicide and tells her that Henry's death was not her fault. She then decides that it is best if she and Ezekiel split up after the death of their adopted son, and they go their separate ways. As the residents of The Kingdom stay at Hilltop, she decides to leave for Alexandria with Daryl.

==== Season 10 ====
In the interval since the blizzard in Alexandria, Carol has left and become a ship captain. However, upon her return, Daryl convinces Carol to stick around. The brutal murder of her son and her divorce from Ezekiel leave Carol struggling with grief and rage to the point of becoming reckless. Carol's decision to blow up the cave where Alpha keeps her horde nearly results in the death of herself and her companions, causing a rift with Daryl after Magna and Connie get trapped and are presumed dead. Carol attempts to use Lydia to turn Gamma against Alpha, despite Aaron's attempts to reach out in a less manipulative manner. Although successful, Carol's actions cause Lydia to take off on her own, although she does eventually return. After the destruction of the Hilltop, Alpha is killed by Negan who, it is revealed, was released by Carol for this purpose without anyone knowing. Carol initially plans to leave once she gets her revenge on Alpha, but ends up changing her mind.

After Alpha's death, Carol is forced to face the consequences of her actions. Any hope of reconciliation with Ezekiel is apparently ended when he departs to meet Eugene's contact Stephanie and also reveals that he has developed thyroid cancer, a condition which is almost certainly terminal in a world lacking modern medicine. Daryl's rage at Connie still being missing creates a growing rift between the two best friends, and other people are wary, angry, and distrusting of Carol due to the damage that her unilateral decision to release Negan caused. The one person who holds no anger towards Carol and is forgiving of Carol's actions is Connie's sister Kelly who, having heard of Carol's reputation, knows that she is the person who acts and does things that no one else is capable of. Kelly maintains the belief that Connie is still alive and will be found one day. During the final battle with the Whisperers, Carol plays a vital role, covering herself in walker guts infiltrating the herd along with several others and then leading it over a cliff. Carol nearly sacrifices herself to destroy the herd, but Lydia saves her and the two women watch the end of the threat of the Whisperers together.

In the aftermath, Carol takes part in the efforts to rebuild Alexandria, which was badly damaged by the Whisperers after its residents had evacuated. With their food supply destroyed, Carol joins Daryl in a mission foraging for food, only to stumble upon the cabin of Leah Shaw, Daryl's lover during his years in the forest after Rick disappeared. With Leah still missing, Daryl finally confronts Carol about the damage she has caused and they go their separate ways. Returning to Alexandria, Carol distracts herself by spending time with Dog, becoming obsessed with trying to catch a rat in her house, and attempting without success to make soup, before finally breaking down. When Maggie's return creates tensions between her and Negan, Carol tries to exile Negan to Leah's cabin, but accepts his return when he decides to stay in Alexandria, though she warns Negan that Maggie will kill him if he stays.

==== Season 11 ====
Following the defeat of the Whisperers, Carol struggles with guilt over her reckless actions that alienated her from Daryl, as well as the dire state of the community following the Whisperers' attack on it. Carol spends a great deal of time helping Kelly search for the still-missing Connie and trying to find a solution to the community's food problems. From a surviving Whisperer, the group learns Connie is still alive and where to look for her, and Connie is finally found. Much to Carol's relief, Connie appears to hold no animosity towards Carol and even volunteers to help her when a storm and a walker herd threaten Alexandria.

After contact is established with the Commonwealth, Carol moves there and gets a job as a baker. However, while the Commonwealth has the modern medicine needed to treat Ezekiel's thyroid cancer, he's too far down the list to get surgery in time. Carol makes a deal with Lance Hornsby to use her unique talents doing jobs for him, in exchange for Lance getting Ezekiel moved up the list. Lance keeps his end of the bargain and Ezekiel's cancer is successfully treated by Yumiko's long-lost brother Tomi, who was a thoracic surgeon before the world changed. While Carol makes it clear that their romantic relationship is over for good, she and Ezekiel fall back into a close friendship. Carol uses her influence with Lance to get Ezekiel and Tomi out of trouble after they are arrested for stealing medical supplies for Ezekiel's secret clinic for those who can't afford healthcare. She comes to Daryl and Rosita's rescue when Sebastian Milton blackmails them into pulling off a dangerous heist for him.

After Lance seizes control of the communities, Carol acts to protect the children with Jerry's help and then to find a hiding Sebastian with Negan's help. Carol makes a deal with Governor Pamela Milton where she gets Lance and in exchange, the communities are returned, and they get all of the supplies they need to finish rebuilding. However, things go badly when Eugene and Max Mercer act to expose Sebastian's greed and he dies during a massacre orchestrated by an imprisoned Lance, partially due to Eugene. Pamela has everyone rounded up and disappeared, but Carol and Daryl manage to escape and break Lance out of prison in order to find their missing friends. After Lance tells them there is a supply train they can follow, Daryl and Carol attempt to exile him for his crimes, unwilling to put up with Lance's manipulations and no longer needing his help. When Lance pulls a gun on them instead, Carol kills her former boss with an arrow to the neck.

While working together with Daryl, Carol makes amends with her old friend. They are joined by an escaped Maggie, Gabriel, and Rosita, and the group tracks their missing friends to a forced labor camp at the now Commonwealth-occupied Alexandria. Alexandria is liberated and their friends rescued. The group turns their attention to overthrowing Pamela. Judith reveals to Daryl and Carol that Rick is still alive and that Michonne has left to search for him. After being overthrown, Pamela tries to commit suicide by having a reanimated Lance bite her, but Maggie puts Lance down so that Pamela can be imprisoned for her crimes, a fate worse than death for someone like Pamela. Once the Commonwealth is saved from being overrun by a massive herd, Daryl and Carol imprison Pamela in her own jail.

A year later, Carol has taken over Lance's old job as Director of Operations at the Commonwealth. Ezekiel now leads as the new Governor. Before Daryl departs to search for other survivors, he and Carol say goodbye and affirm their enduring love for one another.

=== Fear the Walking Dead ===
==== Season 4 ====
Carol (along with Rick Grimes and Paul Rovia) briefly appears in the season premiere, "What's Your Story?", to convince Morgan Jones to come out of isolation at the Junkyard and rejoin the others at Alexandria. She and the others are ultimately unsuccessful and forced to leave without him, before he departs from Virginia and makes his way toward Texas, where he encounters the core group of Fear the Walking Dead.

=== The Walking Dead: Daryl Dixon ===
==== Season 1 ====
In the series premiere, Carol briefly appears in a flashback to her and Daryl's goodbye in "Rest in Peace."

In a flashback in "Deux Amours," Daryl briefly makes radio contact with Carol shortly before he is captured and sent to France. Carol admits that she's trying to adapt to a more peaceful life and reveals that someone came back, but the transmission breaks up and Daryl is unable to hear who Carol names or get Carol to repeat herself.

In "Coming Home," Carol searches for Daryl in Maine following his disappearance. Carol locates a man riding Daryl's motorcycle near Freeport and the man, after being locked in a car trunk by Carol, directs her to where he found the motorcycle. Carol rides off on Daryl's motorcycle in search of her missing friend.

== Development ==
=== Characterization ===
A lot of the tactics she used to survive that relationship [with her husband] pre-apocalypse are coming in very handy now. She's very observant, very methodical. In many ways, I have seen her as a hero from the beginning. Deep down inside, I knew she had struggled against a lot in her life. I knew she was trying and struggling and she was still here.

— Melissa McBride

In the television series, Carol Peletier has been described as taking on a "hero's journey." Executive Producer Scott Gimple said that "[Carol] was strong all along. The apocalypse didn't make her strong. The apocalypse made her show herself that she's strong." He then said, "When we got to Season 4, she had become pro-active. She becomes the one who's doing things. There was dialogue to that. Now, realizing the cost of that, she's still willing to pay the price and she's rewarded by gaining those skills and that strength to save the people she loves."

Created by Robert Kirkman, the writer and creator of The Walking Dead comic book series and franchise, Carol first appeared in the third issue of the comic book series, in December 2003. Despite initially appearing to have similar personality qualities such as being dependent and dominated by others, as well as coming from a background of domestic abuse, Carol in the television series is shown to be more stern and pragmatic, making questionable and difficult decisions other characters could not deal with. Robert Kirkman felt that having Carol outlive her daughter would add more dimension to the show, as well as add more flexibility to its storyline progression. "When a good idea comes up, you have to go with it," he articulated. "Sophia is a character who is still alive in the comic book series and who has contributed quite a bit to the overall narrative and informed a lot of story lines for a lot of different characters. Having Carol [...] survive her daughter as opposed to the other way around as it is in the comics is going to lead to interesting but different stories." Over the course of the series, Carol gradually builds inner strength and turns from a meek and battered housewife to a resourceful and hardened warrior. Robert Kirkman explained in an interview with The Hollywood Reporter that "Carol is her own unique character; it would be a disservice to Melissa McBride to say she's evolved into the Carol from comics. The Carol in the TV show is a wholly original creation that we'll continue to explore on the show to great effect. Everyone in the writers' room loves that character, and we're thrilled with what Melissa has brought to the table. She has definitely become a character that is one to watch, and there's some really exciting stuff ahead for her."

On Carol's reasons for having to kill Lizzie and Carol's mindset in the episode "The Grove," Melissa McBride explained:

No, I don't think there was really any other option. There's a lot of nature versus nurture going on in this episode to look at. As much as it broke Carol's heart to have to do this and to realize this had to be done. They were walking toward the flowers in that scene and Lizzie says, "You're mad at me and I'm sorry." You'd think she'd be sorry for stabbing her sister to death, but instead she's sorry for pointing a gun at her, so she just doesn't get it. It's not a world that's safe for anyone. The ability to fight isn't a one-size fits all; everybody is different. Thematically, there's a lot said about change. Something I got out of this episode for Carol, too, is that you have to change. The world will change you – you have to adapt or die. It's about hanging on to that part of yourself: You can change but don't lose yourself. That's what was happening to Carol – her mindset – she was so hell-bent on protecting these children that she lost a bit of something, and that was her nurturing aspect. She was missing a lot of stuff because her eyes were so set on survival.

Season 8 sees Carol becoming the "warrior" of her group in order to defend them against Negan and the Saviors, who have declared war on everyone and everything Rick Grimes holds dear. Showrunner Scott Gimple said of Carol's character arc in this season: "Her entire storyline has prepared her for this --- she's ready. The strength and bravery that she shows as a person this season, and the ingenuity that she employs... is very satisfying."

=== Casting and portrayal ===
Carol is portrayed by Melissa McBride, who was announced as part of the ensemble cast of the show in late 2010. McBride did not audition for the role of Carol and was simply given the part, believing it was a short-term gig. On an interview with Conan O'Brien, she said that she believed she would be dead "within a few episodes, if not, by the end of the week". McBride has stated that, after receiving the part, she read the comic book up until the point where Carol dies, but was unsure if the producers would go in the direction of her comic series counterpart. She then asserted that she was glad they did not. Carol had a minimal role in the first season, as McBride was hired on the show as a co-star. She was then upgraded to a series regular position starting with the second season and became a part of the main cast in season 4, taking on a more prominent role in later seasons. Andrew Lincoln, who plays Rick Grimes, said of Carol's development: "Melissa McBride (Carol) said maybe five sentences in the first season and now look at what she's done. It's wonderful when you see talent, pure talent, being recognized in this way, and even more thrilling when critically it's recognized as well. The fans knew it quite some time ago, I think, but it's wonderful that she had the opportunity and had that incredible episode to show what she is more than capable of doing. She's a rare talent."

Alongside Laurie Holden, Jeffrey DeMunn and Juan Pareja, McBride was among the cast members of Frank Darabont's production of The Mist to be hired for the television series. McBride felt that this was her "audition" for The Walking Dead.

Originally, Carol was supposed to be killed in the episode "Killer Within", but the producers eventually decided against it. Melissa McBride explained in an interview with Rolling Stone: "[Producer] Glen Mazzara called to tell me that he was planning on killing Carol last season. I said, 'It's really a shame, because there's a lot to her.' He had the writers all on speakerphone. He was interested in knowing what I thought. I went into saying, 'Carol is probably this woman that's got the Avon starter kits and Tupperware starter kits in that back bedroom. She took that course with Tony Robbins. She knows she's capable of so much more, but she's just in that cycle. So, it's a shame, but you've got to do what you've got to do. I understand'." Likewise, former showrunner Glen Mazzara said, "I told her that and then we came up with a better plan that was that if T-Dog had saved her, if T-Dog sacrificed his life we felt that that sacrifice was only worthwhile if Carol lived. But we didn't want to reveal that Carol was alive at the end of that episode because we were really going with the devastation of Lori's death. And we were just embracing the mournful aspect of that last scene where Rick breaks down and we did not want to undercut it with the positive of 'oh, here is Carol'." He then expressed praise over Carol's survival saying, "I will say that I think [McBride] has done a great job with Carol this season, the character has become a fan favorite, the character has really come along, she takes a lot of risks and Carol's work when she sees the baby and then realizes that Lori hasn't made it is one of the best scenes we have done all year and I give credit for that to Melissa and she is just a fantastic actress." Siblings Matt, Macsen and Madison Lintz have all played children of Carol in the television series. Both Matt and Macsen played different aged versions of Carol's adopted son, Henry while Madison played Carol's daughter, Sophia.

== Critical reception ==
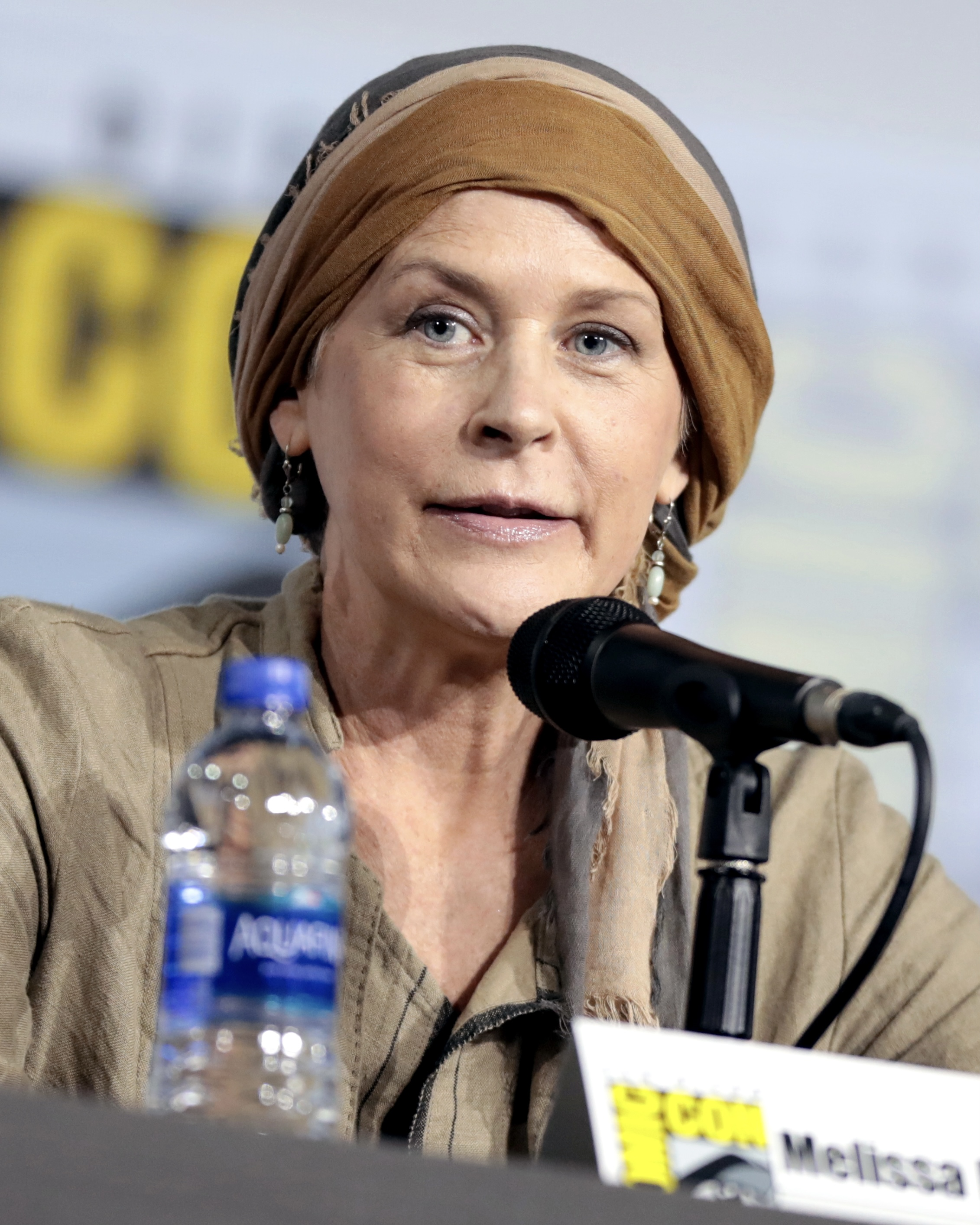
McBride's portrayal as Carol has been critically lauded by television commentators and critics

McBride has received critical acclaim for her performance as Carol and won positive reviews from critics from the third season onwards. Many critics praised McBride's performance in her character's centered episode "The Grove" of the fourth season. In March 2014, McBride's performance in "The Grove" made her TVLine's Performer of the Week, as it concluded, saying, "Now it's our turn to do what we must — applaud McBride for a performance that could stand as a master class in the merits of restraint." Others singled out the actions of Carol in the season 5 premiere "No Sanctuary", which earned critical praise and extremely positive fan reception. In 2014, McBride was a promising contender for a Primetime Emmy Award for Outstanding Supporting Actress in a Drama Series, though she did not receive a nomination.

Writing for Vox, Emily VanDerWerff lauded Melissa McBride's performance in the season five premiere "No Sanctuary," saying:

Say what you will about The Walking Dead's slapdash approach to character development, but McBride's ferocious, frequently Emmy-nomination-worthy performance has made sense of a woman whom the show seemed to actively be avoiding understanding for a good long while. It began in the first half of season two, when Carol's daughter, Sophia, disappeared and was eventually revealed to have become a zombie. In the wake of that loss, Carol began to harden herself, and McBride started giving a flinty, unapproachable performance that gained strength from moments when the old, vulnerable Carol peeked through. In "No Sanctuary," Carol strides around in a poncho that makes one wonder if Hollywood shouldn't remake Clint Eastwood's "Man with No Name" trilogy of Westerns starring McBride instead. She discerns that her friends are in danger thanks to some gunshots and quickly reads the situation in a remote cabin. She decides to turn a herd of zombies toward Terminus, then blows up a propane tank with a couple of well-placed shots and some fireworks. She is completely and totally dominant – not just over her enemies (and the undead monsters who surround her) but over every other character as well. It's impossible to watch her and not think, "Hey, let's have some more of that."

IndieWire singled out McBride's performance in the entire explosive premiere, saying, "But the stand-out was McBride, whose Carol became the most interesting character on the show, simply because she was willing and able to do things other characters wouldn't."

Writing about the episode "Consumed", The A.V. Club's Zack Handlen praised McBride's performance and characterisation as Carol, saying, "McBride is especially great; while her character's evolution came in fits and starts, the actress manages to pull all of that together into a consistent, and endlessly fascinating, persona." Similarly, Rebecca Hawkes of The Daily Telegraph praised Melissa McBride, saying she was "...in a league of her own, capable of quietly dominating every scene she's in."

Many critics praised the character in the second half of the fifth season and onwards into season six where Carol stages herself as a meek housewife in the community of Alexandria in order to be assured that they are trustworthy, which includes stealing back the group's guns in the process for safety precaution and protection. Tim Surette of TV.com said that "[Carol] continues to be the absolute best." He noted that "[Her] reaction was the most interesting one, as she seemingly went all-in on participating in the Junior League, downplaying the kind of badass she became in the woods, and fondly remembering her abusive husband (yeah right) to Alexandria leader Deanna, while also warning Rick in private that the longer the group stayed in Alexandria, the weaker they would become. I love you, Carol, and I love your huge-ass guns." Surette, Mark Perigald of The Boston Herald, and Amanda Michelle Steiner for People found Carol to be humorous in her lies in the episode "Remember."

Rebecca Hawkes of The Daily Telegraph praised the character in her review for "Forget," saying, "Carol is proving to be one of the most complex, interesting female characters on TV right now." Tim Surette for TV.com reviewing "Forget" jokingly stated: "Carol, you continue to amaze me and I am really close to asking you to prom."

For the sixth season, Melissa McBride continued to receive praise. In particular, her work in "JSS", "Not Tomorrow Yet" and "The Same Boat" were noted as standouts. Zack Handlen for The A.V. Club declared Carol "the best character" in his review for "Not Tomorrow Yet." He called her "someone special", and said while Rick had a transformation from "idealistic lawman to ruthless killer", the transition was "dictated more by his position as nominal protagonist—he swung back and forth simply because the writers needed to give him something to do." On the other hand, he noted Carol's transition as unintentional and unplanned. He elaborated further saying, "She's suffered, she's endured, she's lost people, and her gradual transformation seems more like a happy accident than an intentional philosophy. It's one of the few reasons I can think of to rewatch the series; even with the mess of the second season, even with the stalling and the failure of the Governor to provide a convincing threat, even with the writers' struggle to create engaging longform narrative in a serialized context that really only ever provided a handful of convincing individual moments, Carol more or less makes sense." Overall, he considered it a testament to Melissa McBride and her work on the show.

Noel Murray of Rolling Stone ranked Carol Peletier 3rd in a list of 30 best Walking Dead characters, saying, "It's no surprise that the TV version has long-outlived her comics counterpart, who killed herself instead of getting stronger; McBride has helped turn this once peripheral character into a major part of TWD, whether she's putting on a Susie Homemaker act as a front or rescuing her comrades from certain Terminus doom."

== Accolades ==
In 2012, McBride and her fellow cast members won the Satellite Award for Best Cast – Television Series for the third season. For her performance in season four, McBride won the Saturn Award for Best Supporting Actress on Television, and earned a nomination for the Critics' Choice Television Award for Best Supporting Actress in a Drama Series. She was also nominated for Best TV Hero by IGN.

In 2015, for her performance in the fifth season of the series, McBride won another Saturn Award for Best Supporting Actress on Television, becoming the first actress to win the award multiple times and back-to-back years. She received her third nomination in 2016, becoming the first actress in the show to be nominated more than twice. She was also nominated for a Fangoria Chainsaw Award for Best Leading Actress in a Television Series. In 2017, for her performance in the seventh season, McBride received her fourth consecutive nomination for the Saturn Award for Best Supporting Actress on Television, the most nominations of any actress on the show.

Despite constant praise from critics and heavy fan campaigning, McBride has yet to receive a nomination for Primetime Emmy Award for Outstanding Supporting Actress in a Drama Series since her breakout year in 2014 (particularly with "The Grove"). She did however, receive nominations each year since 2014 for the EWwy Awards for Best Supporting Actress in a Drama, (later changed to "Poppy Awards") which recognizes Emmy-snubbed favorites. She did not win her first the award in 2014, but was announced as the winner in 2015 and was nominated for the third time in a row a year later in 2016.
