= Them (The Walking Dead) =

- The Walking Dead episode
- The exhausted group slowly trudge forward in their journey to Washington, D.C.
- Episode no.: Season 5 Episode 10
- Directed by: Julius Ramsay
- Written by: Heather Bellson
- Cinematography by: Michael E. Satrazemis
- Editing by: Rachel Goodlett Katz
- Original air date: February 15, 2015

Guest appearances
- Tyler James Williams as Noah; Ross Marquand as Aaron

Episode chronology
← Previous "What Happened and What's Going On"	Next → "The Distance"
- The Walking Dead season 5

"Them" is the tenth episode of the fifth season of the post-apocalyptic horror television series The Walking Dead, which aired on AMC on February 15, 2015. The episode was written by Heather Bellson and directed by Julius Ramsay. In the episode, the group of Rick Grimes (Andrew Lincoln) are exhausted and dehydrated from their journey to Washington, D.C., while several members of the group continue to grieve over the group's recent losses and question their chances of survival.

The episode primarily centers on the characters of Maggie, Sasha, and Daryl dealing with the losses of Beth and Tyreese. It also focuses on Glenn's sinking depression and giving up hope, while Abraham becomes intensely reclusive and Michonne's struggles to keep holding onto hope. It also features the introduction of Ross Marquand as Aaron, a prominent character from the graphic novel the television series is based on.

== Plot ==
Emotionally burdened by the recent death of Tyreese, (Note: As depicted in What Happened and What's Going On.) the group's van runs out of gas, forcing them to travel the remaining 60 miles to DC on foot while struggling with starvation, dehydration, and a pursuing walker herd.

Rick devises a plan to eliminate the herd with minimal exertion. However, Sasha engages in a reckless assault, cutting Abraham and nearly being bitten. Michonne chastises her, warning her to not end up like Tyreese. They scavenge cars, and Maggie finds a bound walker in a trunk. Glenn kills it and urges her to keep her will to survive. Sasha kills a pack of feral dogs, which the group cooks and eats. Noah refuses to eat, while Gabriel throws his priest collar into the flame.

Despite comfort from Carol, Daryl grieves Beth deeply. Suddenly, the group finds jugs and bottles of water alongside a note reading, "from a friend". Fearing it is a trap, they decide not to drink. The group gains brief respite from sudden rainfall; however, they are forced to take shelter in a barn after it worsens to a severe thunderstorm. Rick relates a story of his grandfather, who survived World War II by convincing himself that he was already a dead man, and that they must do whatever it takes to survive their ordeal. Rick says they are "the walking dead", a notion Daryl rejects.

While they sleep, a herd of walkers attacks the barn. The survivors work together to hold the barn doors closed. The next morning, they discover that the storm annihilated the herd. Daryl tells Maggie that he fixed the music box Gabriel gave her. Maggie and Sasha watch the sunrise, with Maggie comforting Sasha. They discover that the music box is still broken. They are suddenly approached by a man who introduces himself as Aaron (Ross Marquand), revealing himself as the person who left the water behind, and asks for Rick by name. They point their guns at him suspiciously. Suddenly, the music box begins playing.

== Reception ==
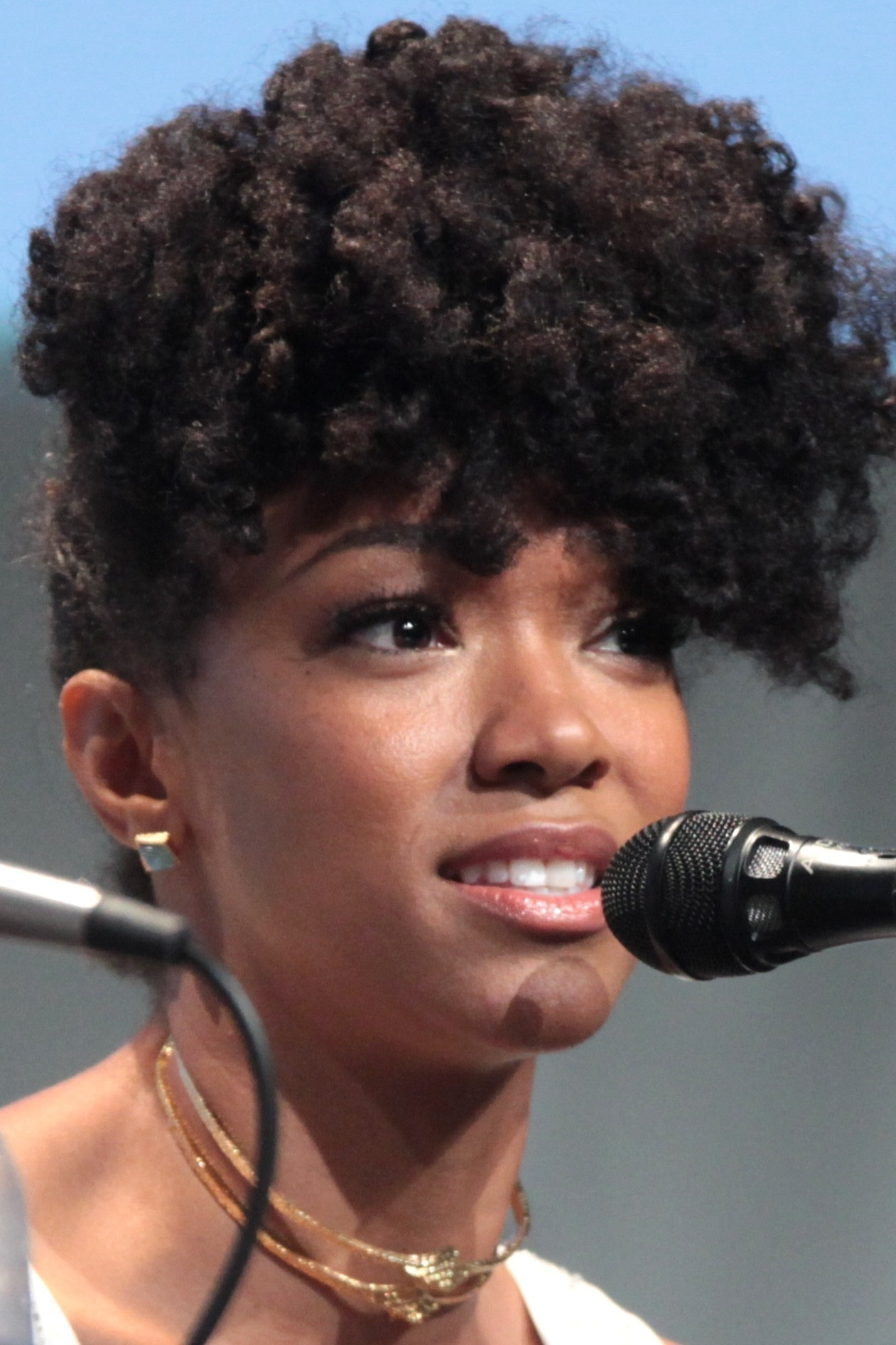
Sonequa Martin-Green received praise for her performance as Sasha in this episode.

=== Viewership ===
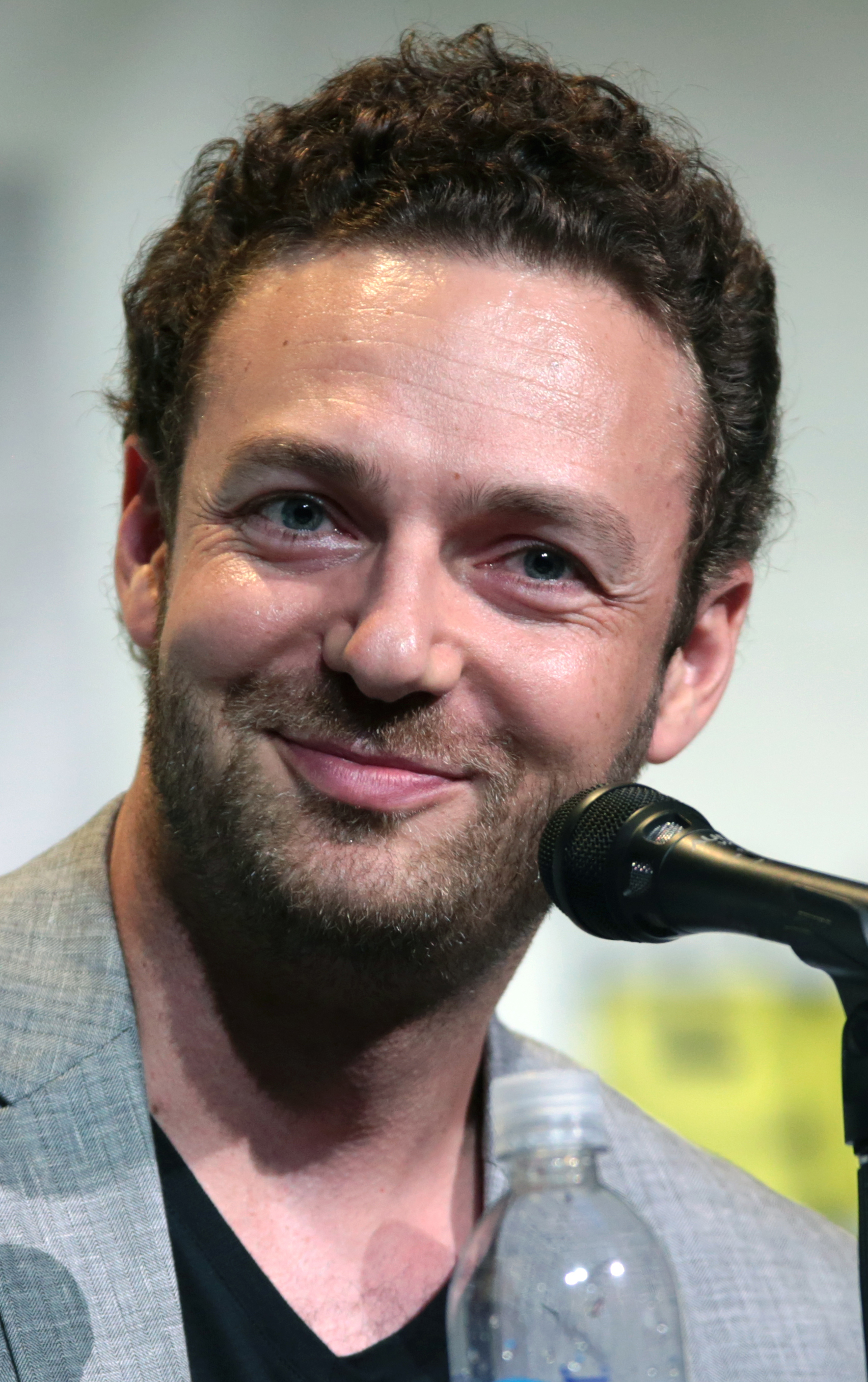
Ross Marquand made his first appearance as Aaron in this episode.

Upon airing, the episode was watched by 12.27 million American viewers with an 18-49 rating of 6.2, a decrease in viewership from the previous episode which had 15.64 million viewers and an 18-49 rating of 8.0.

In Australia, the episode was watched by 70,000 viewers, making it the second most-watched broadcast on pay television that day. The UK broadcast was the third most-watched on the network that month, with 893,000 viewers.

=== Critical reception ===
The episode received generally positive reviews, with many praising aspects such as the theme of grief, the introduction of Aaron at the end and the sequences involving the barn and Sasha fuelling her rage on the zombies. Laura Prudom for Variety commented positively on the episode calling it "contemplative but emotionally satisfying." On his review for the episode, Ron Hogan for Den of Geek commented positively on the episode's themes and felt that Sonequa Martin-Green delivered the best performance of the episode.

Rebecca Hawkes of The Daily Telegraph gave the episode 4 stars calling it "mystical". She felt that the episode "raised interesting questions about whether a life based on survival is little better than being dead", referring to the scene where Rick refers to the survivors as "the walking dead", referencing the title of the series. She further assessed that "while Gabriel may have rejected religion, it was in fact an episode filled with oddly religious, hope-inspiring moments, including the fortuitous arrival of a rain storm just when the group were struggling with their thirst. A sequence in which Daryl, Maggie and Sasha held a barn door close against an onslaught of walkers had a dreamlike, mystical quality." She praised the ending scene, calling it "refreshing" that the series "is returning to a more plot-driven formula."

Matt Fowler of IGN reacted positively to Rick's speech, the scene involving Sasha taking out her rage on the zombies and the introduction of Aaron from the comic book series. Although, he felt the episode covered old ground. Overall, he gave the episode a 7.6 out of 10. USA Today also enjoyed the scene involving Sasha, and called Aaron's scene an "exciting new development".
