= I Ain't a Judas =

- The Walking Dead episode
- The group prepares to defend their refuge.
- Episode no.: Season 3 Episode 11
- Directed by: Greg Nicotero
- Written by: Angela Kang
- Cinematography by: Rohn Schmidt
- Editing by: Julius Ramsay
- Original air date: February 24, 2013

Guest appearances
- Emily Kinney as Beth Greene; Dallas Roberts as Milton Mamet; Chad L. Coleman as Tyreese Williams; Sonequa Martin-Green as Sasha Williams; Jose Pablo Cantillo as Caesar Martinez; Melissa Ponzio as Karen; Tyler Chase as Ben; Travis Love as Shumpert; Daniel Thomas May as Allen; Parker Wierling as Noah

Episode chronology
← Previous "Home"	Next → "Clear"
- The Walking Dead season 3

"I Ain't a Judas" is the eleventh episode of the third season of the post-apocalyptic horror television series The Walking Dead, which aired on AMC in the United States on February 24, 2013. In this episode, Rick Grimes (Andrew Lincoln) and his group debate their next course of action as they find themselves running out of food and ammunition, while The Governor (David Morrissey) prepares Woodbury for battle. Meanwhile, Andrea (Laurie Holden) grows uneasy and decides to travel to the prison to negotiate with Rick's group, but is treated harshly by them.

== Plot ==
Following The Governor's brief but costly attack on the prison, Hershel wants to abandon it. Merle points out it is too late for that; The Governor has had enough time to block all possible escape routes. Moreover, The Governor can besiege the prison and starve them out. Rick and Glenn, however, argue that the group should stay, even though they don't have enough ammunition to clear out the walkers. Rick begins to walk away causing Hershel to challenge him to get his head clear so that he can lead them. Even Carl sees his father would benefit from some rest, and suggests that he let Hershel and Daryl take charge.

The Governor is readying Woodbury for total war. Civilians, including adolescents and disabled citizens, are given weapons and taught to use them, in preparation for combat. Andrea is disturbed by this and asks to leave to negotiate a peace with the prison, but The Governor discourages her, implying that she will not be welcomed back if she leaves.

Andrea asks Milton to help her sneak out, which Milton reports back to The Governor (as per his assignment to "keep tabs on her"). The Governor tells Milton to help her. In the woods, Milton helps Andrea capture and disable a walker, hacking off its arms, breaking its jaws, and tethering it, imitating Michonne. While they are doing so, Tyreese's group comes upon them and kills several approaching walkers. Milton agrees to take Tyreese's group back to Woodbury, while Andrea leaves with her disabled walker for the prison.

At the prison, Glenn quietly suggests handing Merle over to The Governor in a desperate hope of appeasing him. Merle, meanwhile, tries to make amends with Michonne for trying to kill her, stating he was only following orders and was not proud of all that that entailed.

Andrea's arrival at the prison is met with distrust, especially from Rick, who handles her harshly while searching her for weapons. After catching up on the deaths the group has suffered, she warns them that Woodbury is getting ready for a war and offers to negotiate a truce. Believing that peace is not an option, Rick tells Andrea to help them sneak inside Woodbury for a surprise attack, but she refuses. Michonne later relates to Andrea her story of how Merle was sent by The Governor to kill her, demonstrating that he won't allow anyone to leave or live who isn't under his control.

At Woodbury, Tyreese's group has been brought to the infirmary building where they are cleaned up. The Governor gives them his friendly welcome-speech and discusses their ordeals. Allen reveals that they'd been at the prison, where the "crazy" leader, named Rick, chased them out. Tyreese gives The Governor the same offer he'd extended to Rick: to help out and earn their keep. The Governor asks if they could provide a layout of the prison. Allen and Tyreese, wanting admission into Woodbury, gladly agree, while Sasha remains reluctant.

While Andrea is visiting Judith, Carol quietly pressures her to assassinate The Governor. The group gives Andrea a car for her return trip to Woodbury, where she is again greeted with an array of weapons pointed at her. She gives The Governor a full report. Back at the prison, Beth begins singing Tom Waits' "Hold On" in order to boost morale. Whilst Beth sings, Rick states that he will be going on a run for weapons. He and Merle also share an antagonizing look. Later, in his bedroom when he is asleep, Andrea brings a knife to The Governor's throat and contemplates killing him but cannot bring herself to do so.

== Reception ==
=== Critical response ===
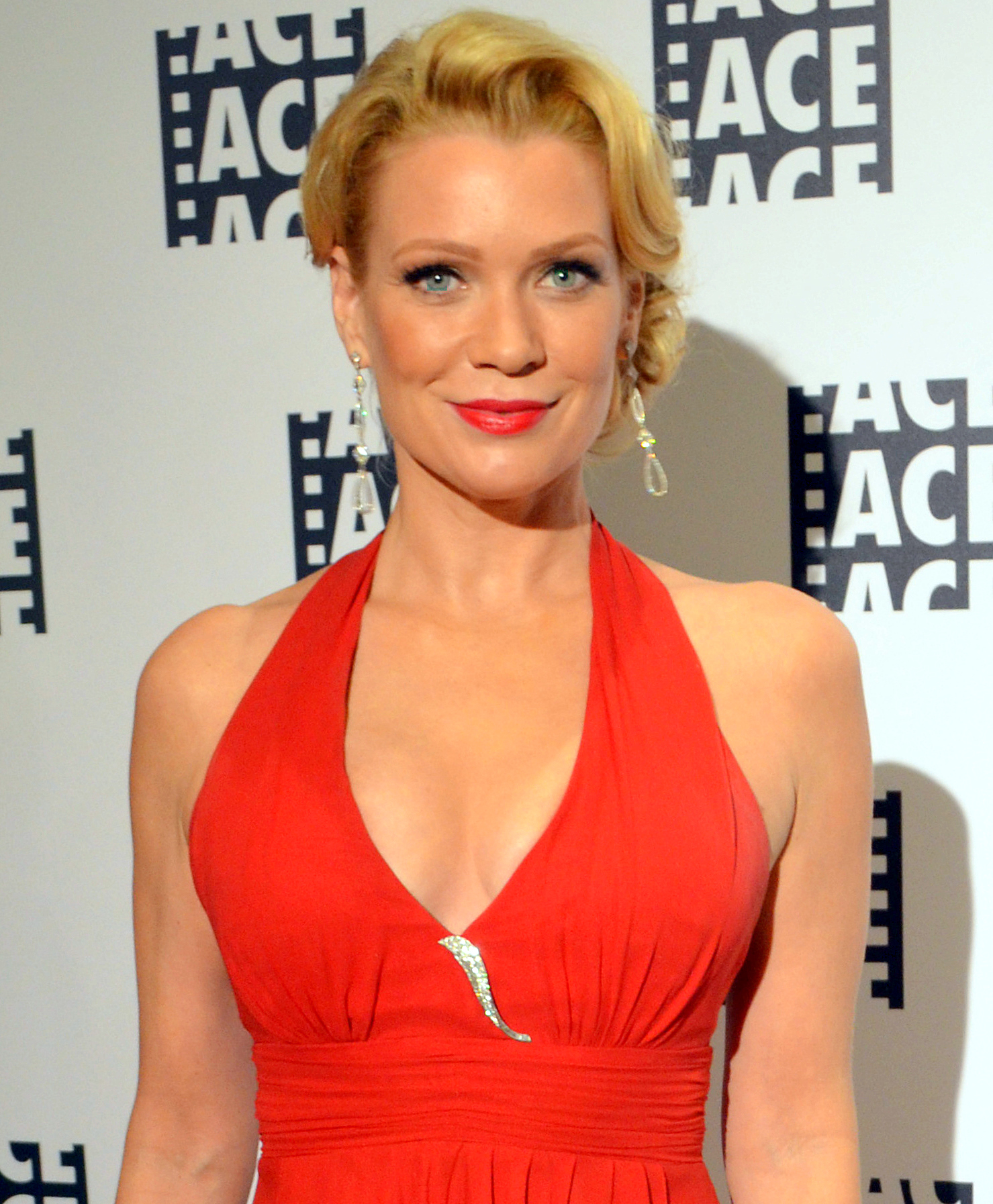
The character development of Andrea (Laurie Holden) was very criticized in this episode.

Zack Handlen, writing for The A.V. Club, rated the episode B on an A to F scale, commenting: "The Walking Dead is good at the most basic mechanism of suspense there is, but there’s more to great storytelling than body counts." Eric Goldman at IGN was more critical, giving the episode a 6.8 out of 10, since the episode was very Andrea-centric, and has disliked the character this season. He did, however, enjoy the return of Tyreese, and Carol's plan to kill The Governor.

=== Ratings ===
The original broadcast, on February 24, 2013, was watched by an estimated 11.01 million viewers, slightly down in viewership from the previous episode.
