= Remember (The Walking Dead) =

- The Walking Dead episode
- Rick is interviewed by Deanna Monroe upon entering the Alexandria Safe-Zone.
- Episode no.: Season 5 Episode 12
- Directed by: Greg Nicotero
- Written by: Channing Powell
- Cinematography by: Michael E. Satrazemis
- Editing by: Avi Youabian
- Original air date: March 1, 2015

Guest appearances
- Tovah Feldshuh as Deanna Monroe; Tyler James Williams as Noah; Alexandra Breckenridge as Jessie Anderson; Ross Marquand as Aaron; Daniel Bonjour as Aiden Monroe; Austin Abrams as Ron Anderson; Corey Brill as Pete Anderson; Major Dodson as Sam Anderson; Ann Mahoney as Olivia; Elijah Marcano as Mikey; Katelyn Nacon as Enid; Jordan Woods-Robinson as Eric Raleigh; Michael Traynor as Nicholas

Episode chronology
| ← Previous "The Distance" | Next → "Forget" |
- The Walking Dead season 5

"Remember" is the 12th episode of the fifth season of the postapocalyptic horror television series The Walking Dead, which aired on AMC on March 1, 2015. It was written by Channing Powell and directed by Greg Nicotero. In the episode, the group enters the Alexandria Safe-Zone and struggles to adapt to the community's normality and lifestyle, as well as distrusts within their environment. Several group members are interviewed by the shrewd former congresswoman, Alexandria leader, Deanna Monroe (Tovah Feldshuh), as they are given houses to live in.

The episode introduces many prominent characters from Robert Kirkman's original source material, including Nicholas (Michael Traynor), Olivia (Ann Mahoney), Jessie Anderson (Alexandra Breckenridge) and her family, as well as a remixed version of the Monroes. It heavily adapts material from Volume 12 "Life Among Them", with major differences being the use of original characters such as Daryl Dixon and his struggle to adapt.

Commentators lauded the episode, citing the introduction to the community and a new safe haven as providing fresh storytelling and a change in tone for the rest of the series. Several critics adulated Carol Peletier's character development and Melissa McBride's acting. The episode also had a rise in ratings from the previous episode with 14.43 million viewers in comparison to 13.44 million viewers in the previous week.

This episode marks the debut of the young actress Katelyn Nacon, who plays Enid, an exclusive character for the television series.

== Plot ==
Rick and the group enter the Alexandria Safe-Zone and are met by Nicholas (Michael Traynor), who asks the group to surrender their weapons. When Rick refuses, Aaron suggests he first meets their leader, Deanna Monroe. Deanna, who first discloses to Rick that she was a former Ohio congresswoman, explains that Northern Virginia was effectively evacuated, but the Army redirected her to the recently constructed planned community with its own solar grid, water systerns, and eco-based sewage filtration. Her architect husband Reg started building the walls and they have been lucky with very few people around, living or dead. Deanna interviews the group members individually, documenting the conversations on camera. During his interview, Rick warns her not to accept strangers, to which she retorts that he is already protecting the Safe-Zone. While being interviewed, Carol lies about her past, implying that she has few survival skills and was merely a "den mother" for the group.

After hesitantly surrendering their weapons, the survivors are given housing, complete with electricity and hot water, and begin meeting the other residents. An elderly couple is enthused about Judith, having not seen a baby for a long time. Rick meets Jessie Anderson (Alexandra Breckenridge), a former stylist who gives him a haircut, while Carl meets the local youth, whose latest member is Enid (Katelyn Nacon), a young survivor recently brought in from the outside. While pleased with their protection, the group is unimpressed with the residents' survival skills, especially Carl, who notes to his father that the comfort in which they live has made them weak. Carl notices Enid sneaking out of the Safe-Zone and follows her over the wall, but loses track of her in the woods. He instead meets Rick, who is attempting to retrieve the pistol he stashed outside town, only to find it is missing. Rick and Carl team up to kill a group of walkers that rushes them, and one that may have been left as a trap.

Glenn, Tara, and Noah join Nicholas and Deanna's son, Aiden (Daniel Bonjour), for a training run. Despite Aiden's cocky behavior, his inexperience and recklessness nearly gets Tara killed by a walker, which they had tied up as a practice dummy in revenge for it killing half of the last group. Glenn and Tara disagree with Aiden's careless use of a walker; Aiden confronts Glenn about this when they get back, starting a shoving match, then taking a swing at Glenn in front of Rick and Deanna. Glenn ducks the punch and lands one on Aiden, while Nicholas tries to get involved, only to be taken to the ground by Daryl. Rick pulls Daryl off to keep him from going too far, and Deanna instructs the town's residents to treat Rick's group as equals. Deanna sends everyone off to check in their weapons and offers Rick and Michonne the jobs of town's constables, which they accept. Deanna makes a point of thanking Glenn for knocking her son "on his ass." Later that evening, alone with Carol and Daryl, Rick states that if the residents prove too weak to protect themselves, their group will have to take over the settlement.

== Production ==
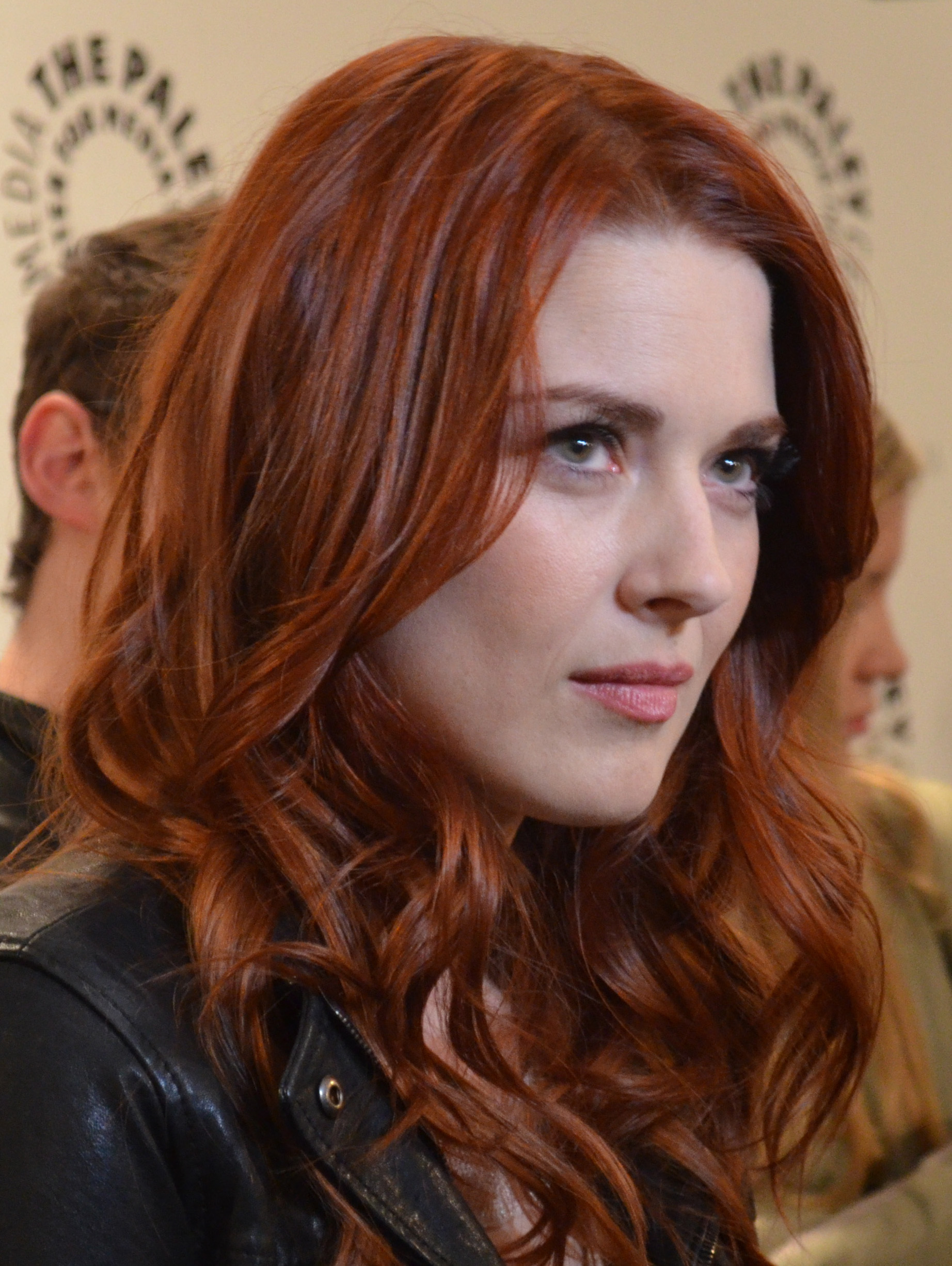
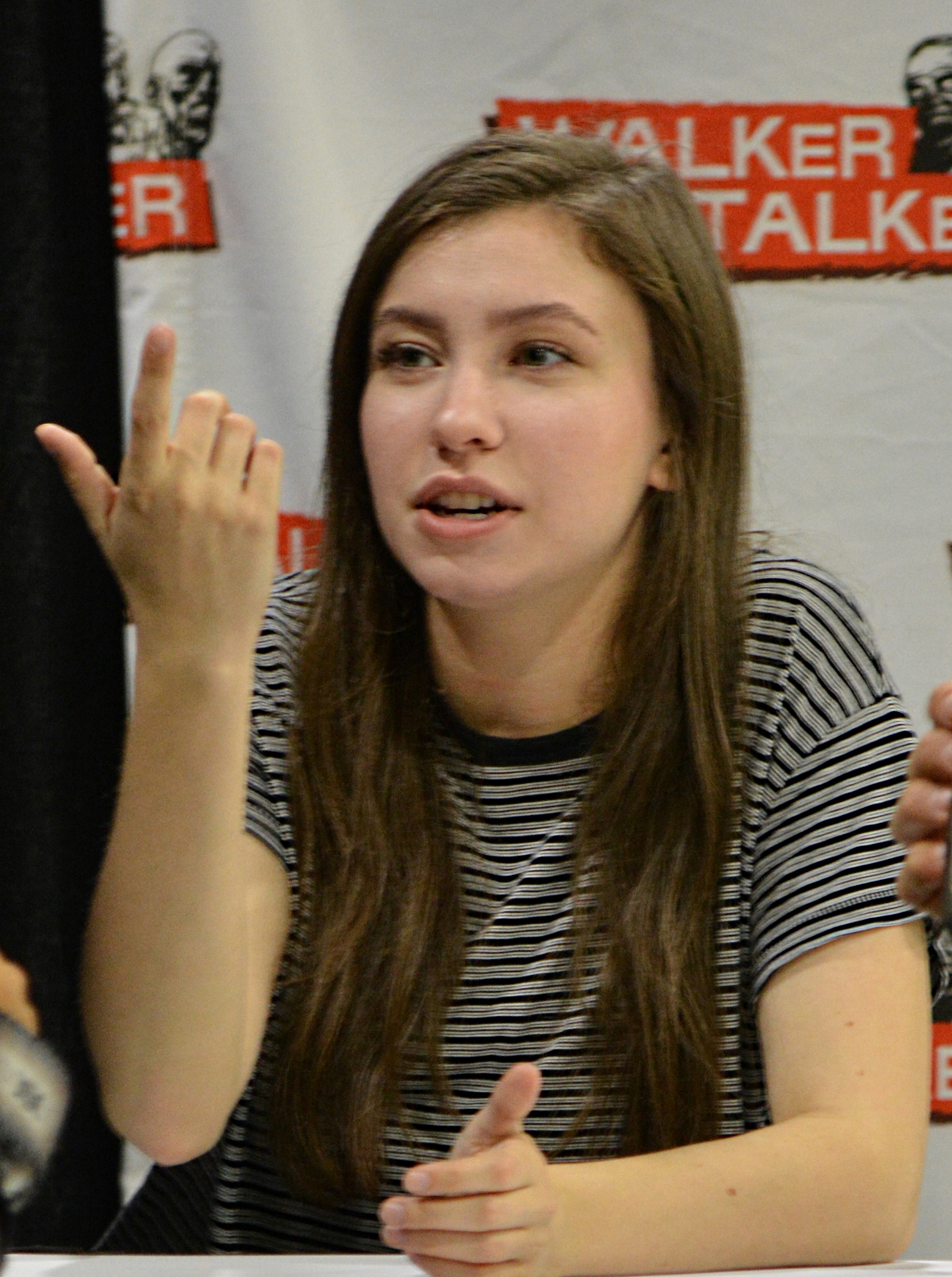
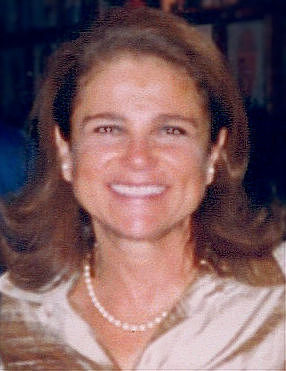
Alexandra Breckenridge (Jessie Anderson), Katelyn Nacon (Enid), and Tovah Feldshuh (Deanna Monroe) made their debut in "Remember".

The episode marks the first appearances of many characters of the Alexandria Safe-Zone community. Katelyn Nacon as Enid, Alexandra Breckenridge and Corey Brill were cast as Jessie Anderson and her husband, Peter Anderson, a gifted surgeon. Major Dodson and Austin Abrams were cast as their sons Sam and Ron Anderson. (In the comics, Ron was a counterpart to a 9-year-old Carl; his role was split into two for the series: a young, timid Sam and a troubled teenaged Ron.) It also features Aiden Monroe, Deanna's son, a character exclusive to the television series portrayed by Daniel Bonjour.

The episode also featured the introduction of Alexandria Safe-Zone leader and former congresswoman from Ohio, Deanna Monroe. The character itself is a remixed version and gender-swap of Douglas Monroe from Robert Kirkman's original source material. Tovah Feldshuh was cast as Deanna Monroe in 2014. Feldshuh explained that her portrayal of Deanna was inspired by Hillary Clinton. She said: "I based her on Hillary Clinton. She's somebody I've admired and somebody incredibly qualified to lead the nation. She's been in service to the United States for a good deal of her life. I studied her as my immediate prototype. I looked at other wonderful congresswomen, and tried to think what I could bring to it: Where did the character connect with my character as a human being? Because there was no time. Don't forget, this wasn't my audition (character). It's not like subliminally I had prepared." On her auditioning process, she described it as "extremely tense" but also "wonderful". She considered Alexandria an "incredible naivete" citing that nothing has happened to the community since the outbreak. On bringing Rick Grimes and the survivors into the community, she said: "Deanna is clearly looking to connect with street smarts, brawn, muscle, but not hooliganism. She has to make sure these people are rational." She further commented that Deanna is a culturist who "needs [Rick's] brawn [just as much as] he needs her cultural brain."

She further assessed the community and her character saying: "Alexandria is named after the greatest city with the greatest library in the world—it was the first great library in Alexander’s empire. And Deanna is a woman of the book. She's a woman of high intellect and a woman who is highly cultured. She's a woman who knows how to get a grandma to babysit little children in her 30-member society. But as a great leader, she knows they need new blood. They need new blood to procreate. They need new genetic pools to get some strong blood in there. And she's desperate for brawn, for warriors that they can trust."

Scott Ian of the American thrash metal band Anthrax makes an appearance in this episode as a walker.

== Reception ==
=== Ratings ===
Upon airing, the episode was watched by 14.43 million American viewers with an 18-49 rating of 7.5, an increase in viewership from the previous episode which had 13.44 million viewers and an 18-49 rating of 6.9. The UK broadcast was the most-watched on the network that week, with 1.22 million viewers. In Australia, the episode was watched by 86,000 viewers, making it the most-watched telecast on pay television that day. In New Zealand, it received 134,620 viewers, as well as 27,190 timeshifted viewers.

=== Critical reception ===
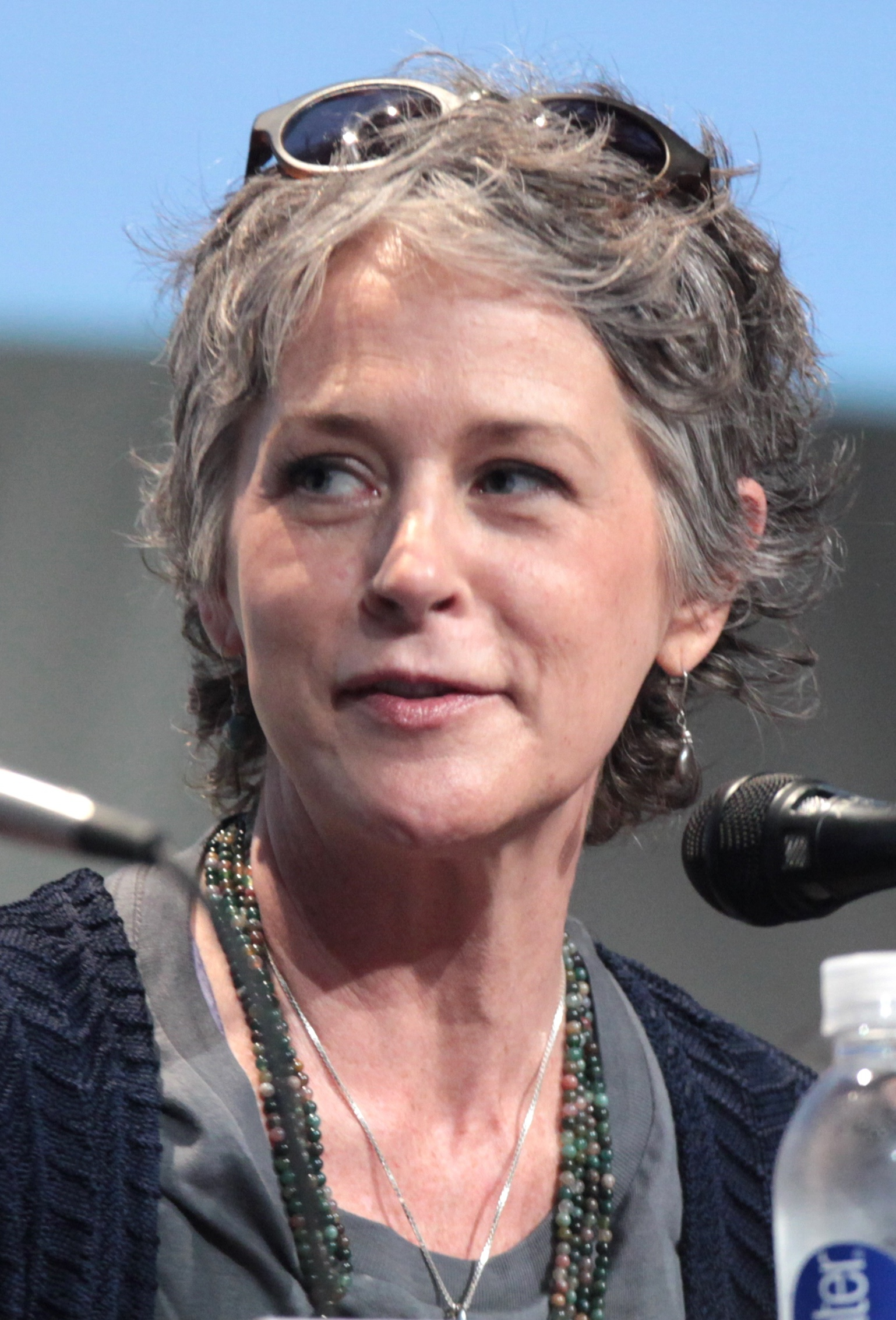
Many critics praised the scenes involving Melissa McBride as Carol in the episode.

The episode was critically acclaimed, with many praising aspects such as the introduction of the Alexandria setting, its shift in narrative, the theme of civilization, and the character development of Carol Peletier and Rick Grimes.

Writing for The Independent, Alex Straker praised Andrew Lincoln and Melissa McBride's performances, as well as noting that the episode would be referred to as "the turning point of the season" in retrospect. Rebecca Hawkes of The Daily Telegraph summed up the episode as "gripping" and deemed Alexandria "brilliantly realised." She also noted that Carol's interview was one of the most interesting scenes of the episode, inferring of her transformation from "victim to killer, heroine, and tough-as-nails fighter, described herself as a former housewife, happiest when cooking and homemaking."

Zack Handlen for The A.V. Club gave the episode an A−, complimenting the writing team for its improvement on structure over the course of the series, and called the episode one of his favorites of the season. He praised the scene involving Carol Peletier (Melissa McBride)'s interview and the character of Carl Grimes and his struggle settling back into a normal lifestyle. He also adulated the prospect of a new status quo, saying: "Another reason that “Remember” works is that it's the first time in a while that the show has suggested the possibility of a new status quo, one that could significantly affect how things work from now on." He further assessed that "What comes across most clearly in “Remember” is the uber-competence of the central ensemble, their skills as survivors, their hesitance to accept the possibility of peace, and their ruthlessness once they realize they might have found a new home." He further complimented the setting as opposed to previous safe havens the characters had stayed in temporarily saying: "Alexandria could be a home base that offers more chance for loss and moral complexity than previous settings. Rick keeps saying that life is about survival, but here’s a chance to make it about more than that, and it could be interesting to see how Rick deals with that possibility."

Tim Surette of TV.com praised the introduction of Alexandria and felt it was a vast improvement of depicting civilization in comparison to Woodbury, a community introduced in the third season. Surette found Carol's reaction to be the standout and most interesting. Surette said: "Carol's reaction was the most interesting one, as she seemingly went all-in on participating in the Junior League, downplaying the kind of badass she became in the woods, and fondly remembering her abusive husband (yeah right) to Alexandria leader Deanna, while also warning Rick in private that the longer the group stayed in Alexandria, the weaker they would become. I love you, Carol, and I love your huge-ass guns." He also noted: "Carol surrendering her guns was hilarious. She continues to be the absolute best." The theme of civilization itself was praised as well. Mark Perigald of The Boston Herald and Amanda Michelle Steiner for People found Carol to be humorous in her lies in the episode.

Matt Fowler of IGN gave the episode an 8.2 out of 10 saying that the episode had "some really satisfying moments featuring the dirty, exhausted survivors experiencing a bit of 'culture shock'."
