= Sasha Williams =

Fictional character

- The Walking Dead character
- Sasha Williams, as portrayed by Sonequa Martin-Green in the television series.
- First appearance: "Made to Suffer" (2012)
- Last appearance: "What Comes After" (2018)
- Created by: Robert Kirkman; Glen Mazzara
- Portrayed by: Sonequa Martin-Green

In-universe information
- Occupation: Firefighter; Guard for Woodbury; Prison Council Member; Supply Runner for the prison Guard and Marksman for the Alexandria Safe-Zone
- Family: Tyreese Williams (brother)
- Significant others: Bob Stookey; Abraham Ford

Sasha Williams is a fictional character (portrayed by Sonequa Martin-Green) from The Walking Dead, an AMC television horror drama series. The character was created by Robert Kirkman, the creator of The Walking Dead comic book series which the show is based on and in which Sasha has no counterpart.

Sasha, her brother Tyreese, and a small family of other survivors stumble upon the prison where Rick's group has already been set up. After being denied sanctuary at the prison, the surviving members of Sasha's group find themselves at Woodbury and serve as soldiers and look-outs for The Governor. As the other members of their original group perish in the war between the prison and Woodbury, The Governor's cruelty is exposed to Sasha and Tyreese, who switch sides and join Rick's group. Sasha eventually becomes romantically involved with Bob Stookey, and later on, Abraham Ford. Sasha becomes the group's sniper. She later dies after ingesting poison as a method of trying to kill Negan.

== Overview ==
Sasha, a firefighter before the apocalypse, is among a large group of survivors (a total of 25 at one point) from Jacksonville, Florida, led by her older brother, Tyreese (Chad Coleman). In Atlanta, Georgia, the group comprises five people when they encounter Rick Grimes (Andrew Lincoln) and his group of survivors in the prison but are quickly thrown out by an emotionally unstable Rick. Sasha and Tyreese then encounter The Governor (David Morrissey) and Woodbury, but after learning of the monster The Governor truly is, Sasha returns to the prison with the other newcomers, becoming a council member to the community.

Sasha forms a romantic attraction with fellow survivor Bob Stookey (Lawrence Gilliard Jr.) and is one of the victims of the illness that affects the prison. Of those so infected, only she and Glenn (Steven Yeun) survive.

Following the destruction of the prison in The Governor's last attack she, Bob, and Maggie Greene (Lauren Cohan) are separated from Tyreese and the others. At this juncture, she forms a relationship with Bob as she reluctantly helps Maggie to find Glenn and meets up with another group led by Sgt. Abraham Ford (Michael Cudlitz). Deciding to accompany Abraham in his quest to embark to Washington, D.C., in search of a cure and sanctuary, Sasha is reunited with Tyreese, Rick, and the rest of their group as both groups merge and continue their journey.

After encountering Gareth (Andrew J. West) and the cannibals of Terminus, and a failed attempt to rescue Beth (Emily Kinney), Sasha suffers the losses of Bob and Tyreese, and becomes more hardened and unstable. After encountering Aaron (Ross Marquand), the group is brought to the Alexandria Safe-Zone where Sasha becomes the lookout in the bell-tower.

Sasha, Daryl, and Abraham aid in redirecting a massive herd of walkers threatening to overrun Alexandria before being drawn into a conflict with another group known as the Saviors, led by the mysterious Negan (Jeffrey Dean Morgan). During this time Sasha develops a romance with Abraham, much to Rosita Espinosa's (Christian Serratos) dismay, until Negan murders Abraham and Glenn. She continues to care for Maggie's well-being at the Hilltop Colony, but seeks vengeance on Negan.

During a botched assassination attempt with Rosita, Sasha is captured by the Saviors. Rather than be used against Alexandria, Sasha commits suicide, becomes a walker who attacks Negan's men, and is put down as a walker by Maggie.

Sasha has been described as a realist who demonstrates a pragmatic approach to survival. Martin-Green called Sasha a "team player on the outside but a loner on the inside", who combats the world through her protective and defensive nature.

== Appearances ==
Sasha is Tyreese Williams' younger sister. Before the apocalypse, the siblings lived near each other in Jacksonville, Florida. As children, Sasha followed Tyreese around and copied everything he did, but bossed Tyreese.

During the outbreak's onset, Sasha and her older brother stayed in a bunker in their neighbor Jerry's backyard. After 7 months, they ran out of supplies, after which Sasha and Tyreese met a family of survivors: Allen, Donna, and Ben, and then joined a larger group of survivors, which numbered 25 members at one point. After their camp was overrun, they wandered for 6 weeks under Tyreese's leadership until they found the prison.

=== Season 3 ===
In the mid-season finale "Made to Suffer", about six weeks after their group is overrun, Sasha, along with Tyreese, Allen, Ben and a mortally wounded Donna (who later dies of her wound), find an entrance into A-Block of the prison. They are found by Carl (Chandler Riggs), who leads them into the foyer of the cell block. In the episode "The Suicide King", Hershel (Scott Wilson) tends to any wounds that the small group have, before Beth (Emily Kinney) walks into the room with baby Judith, to which Sasha, shocked, says that she never thought she would see another baby again. After Rick's group returns from Woodbury, Rick almost accepts them into his group. However, after hallucinating Lori (Sarah Wayne Callies), Rick tells Lori to get out, but Sasha's group leaves the prison in a misunderstanding. In the episode "I Ain't a Judas", a few days later, Sasha's group is found by Andrea (Laurie Holden) and Milton (Dallas Roberts), whom the latter leads back to Woodbury. The Governor appoints Sasha and Tyreese as soldiers, specifically as "wall guards."

In the episode "Prey", when on their wall duties, Tyreese and Sasha are confronted by Andrea, who says she is leaving Woodbury and that they should too. Andrea also warns them about The Governor before she leaves. Later, Sasha goes to the walker pit, where she and Tyreese are shocked to hear about The Governor's plans for the prison. Sasha also witnesses the fight between Tyreese and Allen but when Tyreese tries to push Allen into the walker pit Sasha begs Tyreese not to and he listens. In the season finale "Welcome to the Tombs", Tyreese and Sasha stay behind to protect Woodbury after The Governor's army leads an attack on the prison but Sasha begins to suspect that The Governor might kill them when he returns but knows there may be nowhere to run, so both stay on the wall with rifles in case he comes back. When Rick, Daryl (Norman Reedus) and Michonne arrive at Woodbury after the attack with Karen (Melissa Ponzio), Tyreese and Sasha are at first hostile, but after Karen tells about The Governor massacring his army, let them in Woodbury where they learn Andrea never made it to the prison and is actually captive in the town itself. After Andrea's death, caused by The Governor leaving Milton to turn and bite her, Sasha, Tyreese, Karen and the remaining Woodbury citizens return to the prison with Rick.

=== Season 4 ===
Sasha is appointed as a member of the prison council and a participant in supply runs. In the season premiere "30 Days Without an Accident", she is reluctant to let Bob Stookey go to the Big Spot supply run, but is eventually convinced by Bob. At the Big Spot, when walkers start falling through the ceiling, Sasha, along with all her companions except Zach (Kyle Gallner), who is bitten by a walker, are forced to leave the building after an army helicopter crashes through the roof, without any supplies. In the episode "Infected", after the D-Block attack, Sasha is at the prison council meeting regarding the new disease that killed Patrick (Vincent Martella), when they hear Karen, Tyreese's new girlfriend, coughing. After realizing this is a symptom of the new disease, Sasha, along with Karen, comfort Tyreese, and transport her to A-Block. When a hoard of walkers is attracted to the prison after the gunshots fired during the D-Block attack, Sasha notices that someone has been feeding the walkers rats, before the fence starts to come down. She then helps place two supporting beams when Rick and Daryl draw the walkers away from the fence. In the episode "Isolation", Sasha is revealed to have contracted the disease. In the episode "Internment", she is one of the people infected but still assists Hershel and Glenn in treating the other sick patients. In the mid-season finale episode "Too Far Gone" she along with Maggie and Bob are separated from the main group after an attack by The Governor and his followers on the prison.

In the mid-season premiere "Inmates", Sasha, Maggie and Bob find the prison bus, hoping to find Glenn inside; instead it is filled with undead prison residents which they kill. In the episode "Alone", Sasha disagrees with Bob and Maggie about going to Terminus. Sasha tries to convince Bob to find a safe place to stay but he still wants to go to Terminus with Maggie. When Bob and Sasha find out Maggie left for Terminus they go after her. Sasha finds a safe building and she tries to convince Bob to come with her, but Bob kisses her and goes after Maggie. Sasha looks out of the building's window and sees Maggie under attack. Sasha and Maggie fight off walkers and go after Bob. Reunited, the three head for Terminus. In the episode "Us", Sasha, Maggie and Bob find Abraham (Michael Cudlitz), Eugene (Josh McDermitt) and Rosita (Christian Serratos) and the six rescue Glenn and Tara (Alanna Masterson) from walkers in a tunnel. The group decides to settle down in the tunnel that night and Sasha learns of Abraham's mission and Eugene's claims. She agrees to go on with the group to Washington, D.C., but only after arriving at Terminus to see if Tyreese has made it there. Bob agrees with her, on both counts. The following day, Sasha and the rest of the group arrive on foot at Terminus. After easily entering the compound's perimeter, the group eventually comes upon a middle aged woman, Mary, cooking in a courtyard. The woman smiles and introduces herself, telling them she'll get them settled before offering them a plate of food. In the season finale "A", Rick, Carl, Michonne and Daryl are ushered into a train car where it is revealed that Sasha and the others are being held by the residents of Terminus.

=== Season 5 ===
In the season premiere "No Sanctuary", Sasha and the others escape Terminus and she is happily reunited with Tyreese. In the episode "Strangers", she plays a game of "good out of the bad" with Bob. After a few rounds they kiss. The group find Gabriel Stokes (Seth Gilliam) who leads them to a church, and later, Sasha volunteers to go on a supply run with Bob in place of her brother. They go to a food bank in which the floor has fallen through but Sasha devises a plan to use the shelves to block them away from the walkers to take them out more easily. When Bob is dragged under the water by a walker, Sasha rushes to help him. Later in the church, Sasha and Bob are sat together during Abraham's speech. After the speech she leaves to go hold Judith, giving Bob a kiss before he leaves the church. In the episode "Four Walls and a Roof", Sasha searches for a missing Bob. She confronts Gabriel about it, believing the disappearances of Bob, Daryl and Carol are connected. However, Gabriel is revealed to have nothing to do with it but breaks down in tears, revealing his own sins. After Bob is dumped outside, Sasha rushes to him, enlisting Tara and others to carry him inside. She is shocked to learn that Gareth had followed them and eaten his leg in front of him, but he refuses medicine and reveals the walker bite on his shoulder. Sasha stays by Bob's side when he is moved into Gabriel's office. She volunteers to go with the others to kill the Terminus survivors. Tyreese tries to persuade her to stay with Bob for when he wakes up but she insists on going. When they ambush the Terminus survivors, Sasha kills one of them (Martin, the one Tyreese claimed that he had killed during the destruction of Terminus) by stabbing him repeatedly. When Bob dies Sasha readies her knife to stop him from reanimating, but Tyreese takes the knife from her, to spare her by doing it himself. Sasha is then seen wearing Bob's green military jacket, making a makeshift gravestone from twigs and rope. Sasha stays at the church to wait for Carol and Daryl, instead of going ahead to Washington, D.C., with Abraham and his group when they leave. In the episode "Crossed", Sasha is distraught over Bob's death and wears his military jacket in memory of him. The group head to Grady Memorial Hospital in Atlanta where Carol and Beth are forcibly being held. She accompanies Tyreese, Rick and Daryl, and after much hesitation, accepts Tyreese's consoling to move on and honour him by embracing the good in others. When the group capture two officers as hostages, Bob Lamson (whose name piques Sasha's interest) speaks to Sasha when the others leave about his killed and reanimated partner, gaining her sympathy. She offers to put Lamson's partner to rest only to be knocked out by him as he flees. In the mid-season finale "Coda", Sasha is frustrated with herself over being tricked by Lamson, who has since been killed by Rick after trying to escape and dismisses that she and Tyreese are and can be the same as Bob's death left her naive. Later, Beth is killed during an exchange for the other officers and they leave the hospital.

In the mid-season premiere "What Happened and What's Going On", after Tyreese is killed Sasha is seen visibly distraught so much so that she can not even pick up a shovel to help bury his body. In the episode "Them", the group are sixty miles from DC and Sasha continues to grieve for her recent losses. She lashes out at walkers in rage, breaking the group's formation to not use weapons in order to conserve energy, leaving the group forced to help her in killing them. Michonne shows concern and warns her that her rage could get her killed. She kills a pack of wild dogs that threaten the group and they serve as food for the group. Maggie and Sasha bond over their recent deaths alone together as a man suddenly walks up to them and introduces himself as Aaron (Ross Marquand). He asks to talk to Rick, saying he has good news. In the episode "Remember", Aaron has recruited the group to Alexandria after initial distrust, and Sasha is not given a job yet. The episode "Forget" focuses on Sasha's posttraumatic stress disorder and struggle to adjust to Alexandria's lifestyle. She takes shooting practices outside the walls and later volunteers to keep watch in the guard tower outside Alexandria. Deanna Monroe (Tovah Feldshuh) agrees on the condition that she can attend her party. Sasha reluctantly attends and meets Spencer Monroe (Austin Nichols), who takes an interest in her. She later lashes out and leaves after being asked what her favorite meal is and hearing other trivial matters, receiving flashes of the recent people who have died. The next day, Deanna asks Sasha what happened and she responds that Alexandria "isn't real", referring to its sense of suburbia but Deanna, while accepting of her trauma, dismisses it and hands her a box of ammunition, leaving her to her new job. In the episode "Try", Sasha becomes overwhelmed with guilt after learning of Noah's death, as she told him he would die, and begins hunting walkers. Concerned, Michonne and Rosita go out to find her where they find her fighting a pack of walkers and narrowly save her though she yells at Michonne stating that she didn't need to be saved, before breaking down and telling them about what she said to Noah and how guilty it is making her feel. Later she returns to the tower and shoots down a pack of walkers headed for the gates. In the season finale "Conquer", Sasha is first seen carting walkers individually into a mass grave alone, outside Alexandria. She then lies in the grave in silence. She is later seen sitting quietly in Alexandria's chapel, when Gabriel walks in. She asks him if he can help her, to which he replies "No". Gabriel accuses her of killing even when she had no reason to or it wasn't in self-defense, and aggressively throws guilt on her shoulders. She shouts for him to stop, before the two have a brief fight. Sasha ultimately wins this fight and points her weapon at Gabriel, who is lying on the floor with Sasha keeping him down with her foot. Maggie walks in and defuses this situation, and the three of them are later seen in a circle in the chapel, praying.

=== Season 6 ===
In the season premiere "First Time Again", Sasha is shown in a flashback walking home as she sees Abraham drunk. He gestures a peace sign which she jokingly returns. The next day Rick addresses the community and reveals the nearby quarry is overrun with walkers kept inside only by a few trucks at the exits, the reason Alexandria has avoided being overrun, which is in danger of collapsing and Rick proposes re-directing the herd onto the main road and away from Alexandria. Sasha volunteers to help Daryl lure the walkers on the road to stay ahead of them, insisting he can't do it alone. Abraham abruptly volunteers to accompany her. As Rick goes over the plan, Abraham asks Sasha if she is doing such a risky task to die. To his surprise, Sasha smiles, telling him "no". Sasha and Abraham take their car and travel with Daryl along the main road, but Abraham briefly jumps out of the car and throws himself at the walkers to keep them following which concerns Sasha. However, as they are halfway through their plan, a loud horn goes off, distracting half the herd away. In the episode "Thank You", Daryl insists on going to help Rick but Sasha and Abraham insist he stay or their lives will be endangered. Eventually Daryl comes to his senses and rejoins them and they continue leading the herd away. In the episode "Always Accountable", Sasha, Abraham and Daryl have driven 20 miles away as planned and begin their trip home but are ambushed by other survivors in a car who separate Daryl from them and wreck the car. Sasha and Abraham wander to a nearby town to find shelter, as Sasha decides the best way to find a tracker is to stay put, so they mark the door "Dixon" for Daryl to find them. Sasha becomes uncomfortable when Abraham insists on needlessly killing walkers at the risk of exposing himself to greater danger. She confronts him on his recklessness but he shrugs it off, reminding Sasha of her outlast at Deanna's welcoming party. Later after Abraham returns, acquiring an RPG and various other weapons from a wrecked military vehicle, he admits she is right about his recklessness and commends her for calling out his bullshit. She tries to help him through his PTSD and tells him he has choices. He confesses a romantic interest in her, and believes she reciprocates these feelings. Despite this, she insists he has "stuff to take care of". The two are eventually found by Daryl and they begin driving back. In the mid-season finale "Start to Finish", on the way back to Alexandria several bikers force the group to stop and declare that all of their supplies now belong to Negan (Jeffrey Dean Morgan).

In the mid-season premiere "No Way Out", Abraham is held at gunpoint by the leader, to which Sasha tries to negotiate to save his life. Both are then held at gunpoint about to die, but the bikers are killed in an explosion caused by Daryl with an RPG. When Glenn is about to be killed, Sasha and Abraham save his life and help the others kill the remainder of the herd at Alexandria. In the episode "Knots Untie", two months have passed and Sasha and Abraham continue bonding on patrols. Aware of his attraction to her despite being in a relationship with Rosita, she changes her shift to go on guard duty, leaving Eugene to take her place. In the episode "Not Tomorrow Yet", Sasha goes with the others to attack the base of the Saviors (Negan's group). Sasha tries to break into one of the Saviors' rooms as Abraham (who has since broke up with Rosita) is almost killed by a feral Savior who Sasha then stabs repeatedly, but before she can kill him, he presses the alarm to alert his group of their presence. Sasha kills another Savior and escapes with the others. In the episode "Twice as Far", Sasha is saddened by the news of Denise's death and worries for Abraham's wellbeing. He reminds her of how she told him he had choices, and says that she has them too. He tells her that it could be thirty years for them at Alexandria, but it wouldn't be enough. She then tells him to come inside, implying the beginning of their relationship together. In the episode "East", Sasha and Abraham are happily together. She guards the gate until Abraham takes her place. She learns that Carol has left, and tells Rick that she had not heard or seen anyone leave overnight on her six-hour shift. She then deduces that Carol must have left during her shift change. In the season finale "Last Day on Earth", Sasha tags along with Rick, Abraham, Eugene, Aaron and Maggie to get Maggie to see a doctor at the Hilltop Colony. The group find themselves cornered by Saviors, and Sasha and Eugene work out different routes to take that are the safest. Abraham speaks to Sasha about the possibility of having children, and Sasha questions whether able would be prepared to take up that responsibility. They are compromised and leave the RV with Eugene, carrying Maggie with them. However, they are captured and forced to kneel as Negan arrives, deciding to kill one of them off. It is not shown who is killed.

=== Season 7 ===
In the season premiere "The Day Will Come When You Won't Be", Abraham is revealed to be Negan's victim. Just before Negan kills him, Abraham silently signals the peace sign he and Sasha often waved to each other. Sasha is then forced to tearfully watch, as Negan violently slams Lucille into Abraham's head, killing him and destroying much of his skull. Amidst her grief, she is also forced to watch Negan severely kill Glenn in the same manner, after Daryl recklessly punched Negan to avenge Abraham. After Negan leaves, Rosita comforts Sasha, amidst her grief as they and Eugene carry Abraham's corpse to a truck while the others carry Glenn's corpse to the truck so they can be buried at Alexandria. Sasha however goes with Maggie to the Hilltop as she still requires medical attention.

In the episode "Go Getters", Sasha and Maggie have made it to the Hilltop where Glenn and Abraham are secretly buried. Sasha and Maggie bond and come into conflict with the arrogant and cowardly leader Gregory (Xander Berkeley) who refuses to let a pregnant Maggie stay. Jesus comforts Sasha and reminisces on meeting Abraham with her. At night, the Hilltop is left under attack with the threat of walkers, leading Sasha and Jesus (Tom Payne) to take them out. Later, Sasha tries to negotiate with Gregory, which leads him to make a sexual advancement, which Maggie shuts down. Maggie punches him and declares that the Hilltop is their home. Sasha and Maggie then later have dinner with Enid (Katelyn Nacon) who travels to the Hilltop. Sasha asks Jesus to find where Negan lives, and to keep it between the two of them.

In the mid-season finale "Hearts Still Beating, Sasha is caught in a lie about the time Jesus left by Enid. Sasha tells Enid that she is doing it for Maggie's own good and to keep her safe from the trouble of Negan. Enid tries to tell her that she and Maggie aren't the only ones who want to kill Negan, however Sasha is unconvinced. Later, Sasha is euphoric when Rick and the others come to the Hilltop and everyone reunites, ready to fight against Negan.

In mid-season premiere "Rock in the Road", Rosita is still displaying animosity towards Sasha since she feels jealous of Sasha begin a relationship with their late lover. In the episode "Say Yes", Rosita comes looking for Sasha, claiming she needs her help. Knowing that the task in question is killing Negan, Sasha agrees to help so long as she gets to take the shot. Having predicted this, Rosita gives her a sniper rifle. Sasha states that while she is up for it, Rosita should know what this will cost them, with both of them knowing this will likely result in them dying.

Sasha begins preparing for this mission in the episode "The Other Side", with Jesus providing her with a layout of the Sanctuary for her to plan around. She initially plans to tell Maggie her plans, but when the Saviors pay a surprise visit to the Hilltop, she's forced to flee with Rosita through an escape hatch they prepared. During the journey, Sasha attempts to get to know Rosita, but all her efforts are rebuffed with Rosita insisting they focus on the task at hand. Sasha advocates a stealth approach, suggesting they take a sniper position and stay outside the gates, but Rosita feels that they need to get inside to ensure Negan dies. They try Sasha's plan first, setting up in a factory adjacent to the Sanctuary. Rosita eventually begins to open up to Sasha and admits that she wasn't angry at her so much as being angry at the situation. When they miss their window to take a shot at Negan, they wait until nightfall before breaching the fences. Sasha goes through first, but then seals the fence. Rosita is shocked by this, but Sasha insists their friends need her before charging into the Sanctuary, cutting down several Saviors in her path.

In the episode "Something They Need", Sasha is shown to have been captured and locked in a cell where she is visited by a Savior named David. He attempts to rape Sasha, but Negan intercedes, killing David. He apologizes to her, cutting her ties, and states that he is impressed with her willingness to die in the name of a mission. He leaves her a knife and states she has a choice: kill herself or kill David when he reanimates and show she is willing to join his side. She is later visited by Eugene who implore her to join Negan, but she tells him to leave. She eventually decides to kill David, impressing Negan who reveals he has a spy watching Rick and knows they are conspiring against him. When Sasha sees Negan will use her to hurt her friends, she begs Eugene for a way to kill herself though her intent is still to kill Negan. Unfortunately this course of action is foiled when Eugene gives her a poison capsule in place of a weapon.

In the season finale "The First Day of the Rest of Your Life", it is revealed that while Negan intended on using her as a bargaining chip at Alexandria, Sasha chooses to take the poison capsule in order to foil Negan's plans. When Negan prepares to reveal her to Rick as a hostage, alive and well, she bursts forth as a walker and tried to attack him, killing another Savior in the process. Later in the episode, Jesus and Maggie find her, and Jesus holds down the zombified Sasha for Maggie to finish her with a knife.

=== Season 8 ===
Sasha, as a walker, briefly appears in Eugene's flashback in "Time for After".

=== Season 9 ===
In the episode "What Comes After", in a vision, Rick walks onto a field filled with the bodies of all his friends, where he speaks to Sasha, who reminds him that all that he has done has been for the good of all. Sasha tells him that he will find his family, as they are not lost.

=== Season 10 ===
Sasha appears in the episode "What We Become", during one of Michonne's hallucinations where she has to decide who to kill with Negan's baseball bat, Lucille.

=== Season 11 ===
In the eleventh season, Sasha appears in the form of flashbacks in the episodes "Lockdown" and "Outpost 22." She is also featured in the final episode of the series ("Rest in Peace"), speaking the words "We're the ones who live."

== Development ==
=== Casting ===
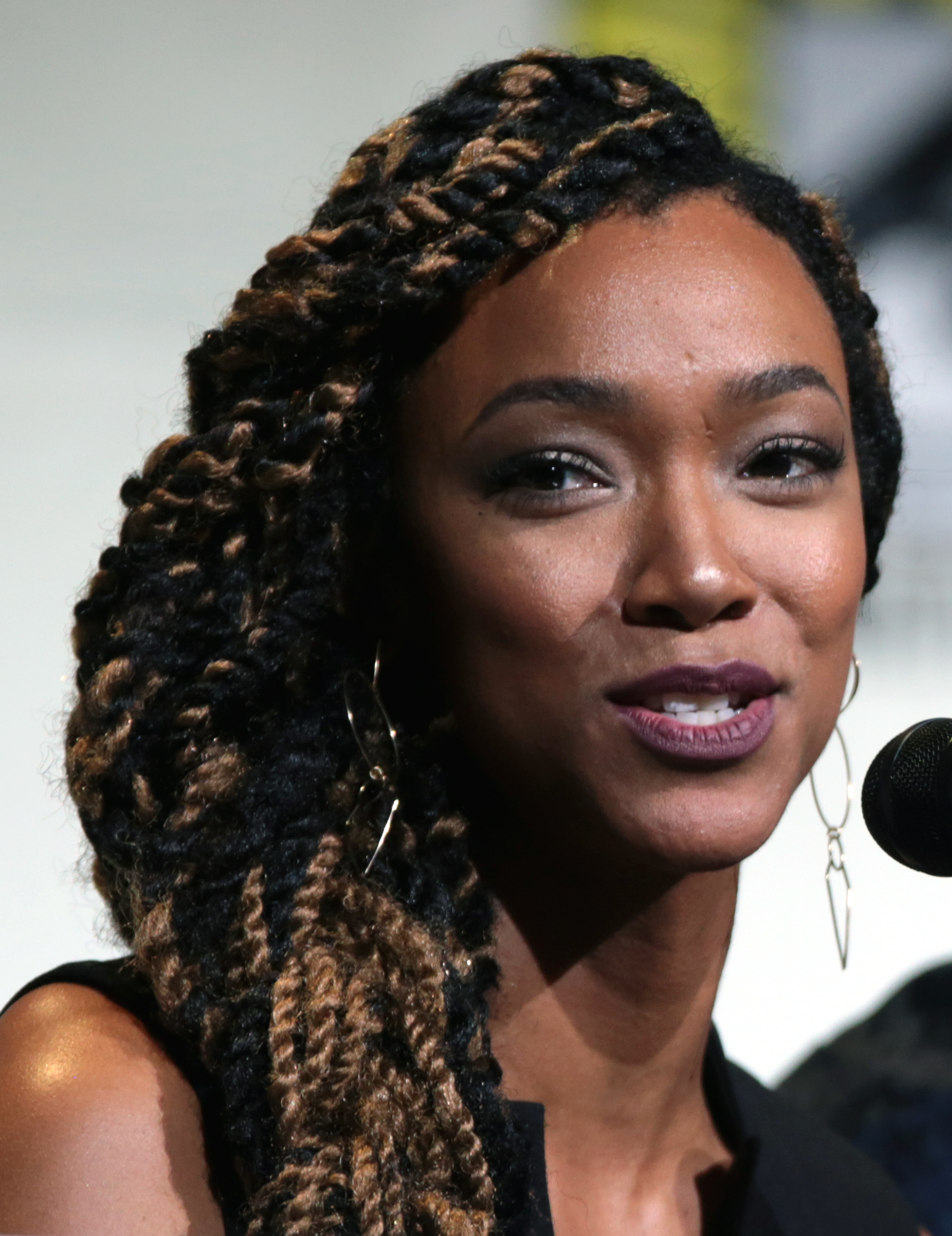
Sonequa Martin-Green portrayed Sasha Williams on The Walking Dead, a role specifically created based on her audition for the series.

In 2012, Sonequa Martin-Green auditioned for the role of Michonne, albeit with a pseudonym due to the secrecy of the auditioning process. When Danai Gurira was cast, in what Martin-Green said was "the perfect choice", former showrunner Glen Mazzara still wanted Martin-Green to be a part of the show and decided to create a role specifically for her. She was cast in a recurring role on The Walking Dead as Sasha, Tyreese's kid sister, an original character exclusive to the television series. Martin-Green explained: "[Sasha] was supposed to be a recurring character and as we kept going forward, they picked up my option to be a regular. It's very rare and I'm still quite dumbfounded about it but Glen and I hit it off and I still appreciate him. He wanted to work with me and wrote Sasha for me." She was promoted to a series regular for season four. After auditioning for the role of Michonne, she read the first three volumes of the graphic novels in preparation for the television series. Knowing they diverged from the television storylines, she chose not to continue reading the comic book series to avoid being aware of future storylines that may occur on the television series.

=== Characterization ===
Sasha has been described as a realist who demonstrates a pragmatic approach to survival. Martin-Green called Sasha a "team player on the outside but a loner on the inside", who combats the world through her protective and defensive nature. Over the course of the series, Sasha is "pushed further and further to repression and brutality", in contrast to her brother who desperately tries to retain his humanity. Martin-Green commented that: "Sasha [...] is someone who has always been apt to step away from humanity and close herself off" in contrast to her brother, who embraces his humanity at all times. Martin-Green commented on Sasha's relationship with her sibling having juxtaposition on how they view the world, which "makes them both better and challenges them in the best of ways. After going through different experiences after the assault on the Prison and Terminus, she believed there to be a "disparity between them, and there always has been. They've always seen life in a different way. But that distance between them is definitely growing because they've both gone through some pretty traumatic things that have pushed them further to what they were already feeling."

Sasha is a fiery yet compassionate young woman. Being tough and talented with firearms, she acts as the primary sharpshooter of Rick's band of survivors. She commands authority, as seen in the season four premiere, where she directs orders and gives permission for Bob Stookey to contribute and accompany her group on a supply run, which she co-leads. During the downfall of the Prison, Sasha insists on Bob and Maggie, her fellow escaping survivors, to follow her lead and find a place to live for themselves. She is the only survivor to reject the notion of a sanctuary where the survivors head to, considering it to be false hope, which is later revealed to be true. Sasha appears to be a realist.

She's hit rock bottom. It's been an honor for me to portray PTSD (in honor of those who have suffered from it). And that's what you hope - you hope that there's a light at the end of the tunnel; you hope that you can cross over to the other side, and find a reason to live again. And not just live, but thrive. And that's what I'm hoping that she finds - a way to respond correctly to the deaths of her most loved ones...

— Sonequa Martin-Green on Sasha's posttraumatic stress disorder over her losses in the fifth season.

On her relationship with Bob Stookey, Sonequa Martin-Green said: "Bob really signified the beginning of hope for her." She further commented that "She was very closed-off after everything that happened in season 4 with Terminus, which was what she had suspected" but "Bob [...] saved her from that exclusion" which was "the first time someone got through to her." She commented that "[Bob] got through to her more than Tyreese [...] and other people in their group". She felt that "the romance helped because suddenly there is hope, there is a promise of something delightful to look forward to. He gave her something to look forward to." She further assessed that her relationship with Bob and his death pushed her forward into becoming guarded and closed off than she was beforehand. Martin-Green felt that Sasha learned how to "entertain hope and connect with people" more through Bob. He also showed her that there's more to life than just "survival." An event which later takes place comes into fruition where she tries to entertain hope with one of the group's hostages, a police officer with the name of Bob who takes advantage of her grief and knocks her out, managing to escape from the group's clutches thereafter. Martin-Green felt that this turned Sasha back to where she had been before forming a bond with Bob, but even less trusting.

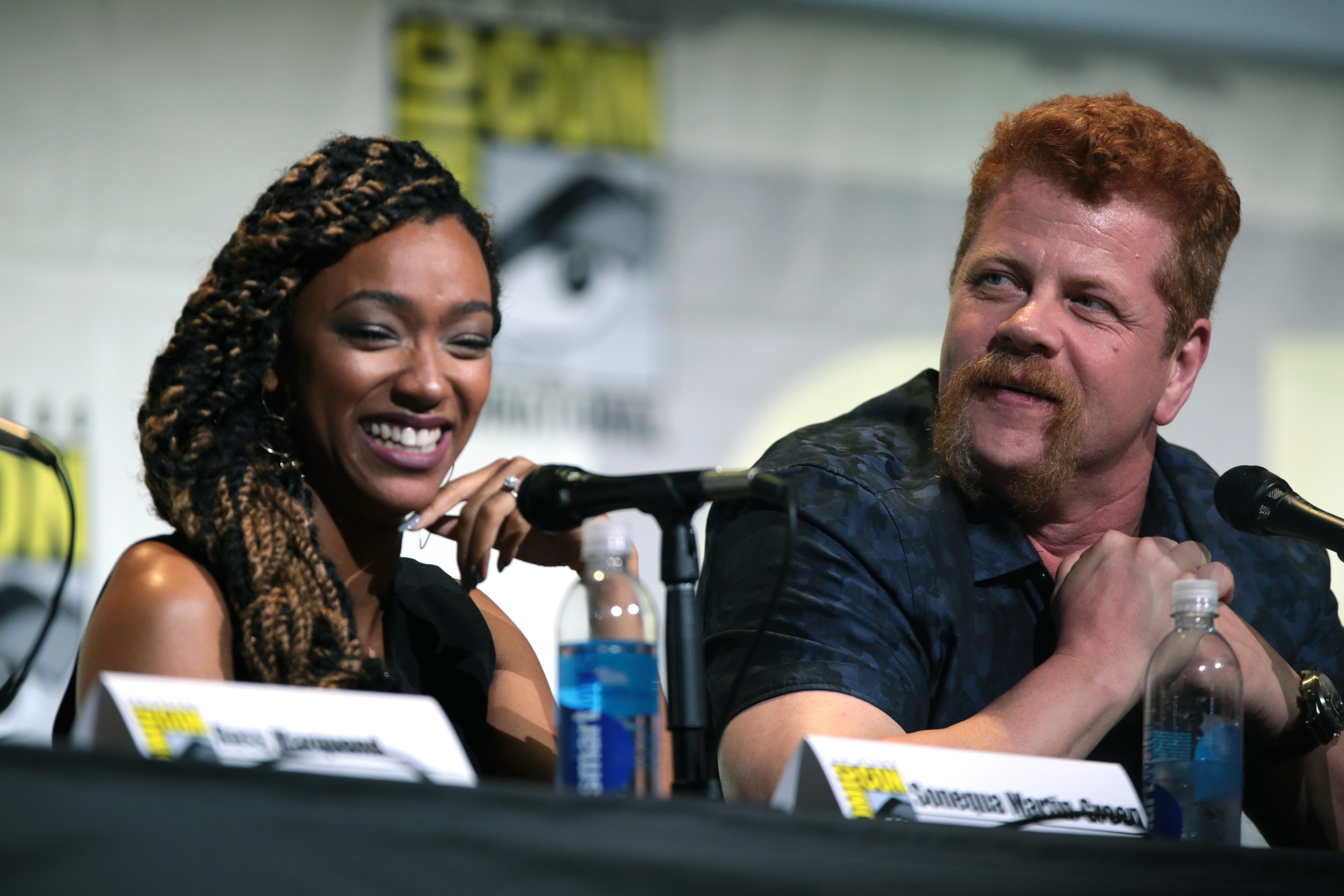
Sasha enters into a relationship with Abraham Ford (Michael Cudlitz, right) in the sixth season.

She was originally a recurring character, but was upgraded to the main cast of season four. She is credited as also starring until the end of season five. Beginning with season six, Martin-Green's name appeared in the opening credits.

In the sixth season, Sasha pursues a relationship with Abraham. On Talking Dead, Sonequa Martin-Green admitted to being "a bit surprised" but "really liked the storyline". She felt that Sasha and Abraham had "parallel experiences and similar struggles" as well as having a "soldier's mindset" and having a "PTSD link" through their losses. Martin-Green also said that Sasha is helping Abraham in the same way Bob helped her, honoring his memory. After this, Abraham and Sasha pursue a relationship.

However, this is cut short by the death of Abraham by Negan (Jeffrey Dean Morgan) in the seventh-season premiere. Due to the fact that they had to hide the death from Abraham's perspective in the sixth-season finale, Greg Nicotero had to work around a way for Abraham to say farewell to Sasha in the following episode. Michael suggested a peace sign, which is used between Abraham and Sasha several times in the sixth season. Cudlitz described it further and said: "For those paying attention, the peace sign is something that was between me and Sasha throughout the series. It was an unspoken, very loaded peace sign. We had to find a way for Abraham to connect with Sasha for him to say good-bye specifically to Sasha. We had already established in the finale of last year that eye contact was not broken. He got knocked down, he came back up. We could add dialogue, but there was no way for him to turn away or nod nothing to Sonequa. Going back into it, we had to figure out a way to tell Sonequa, tell Sasha, that everything would be okay and to say good-bye. That was what we came up with."

On Sasha's willingness to sacrifice herself after the loss of Abraham, Martin-Green said: "Sasha [...] feels she's come to a defining moment in her life now" and she "and the rest of the group feel that they have a tremendous opportunity to redefine the world they live in; Sasha represents a reality that is bigger than what Negan represents." She went further, "There are so few of us who are still alive and we have a responsibility to make sure the right ideals are being upheld and we are willing to sacrifice everything to get it. Like getting Maggie to the Hilltop when she and her baby were not well — and we lost family on that mission but we were all ready to sacrifice ourselves to carry on those legacies. Sasha feels like she's carrying out Abraham's legacy. It's really moving." Furthermore, Martin-Green commented on her character development and shifting perspective. She noted that Sasha was "very selfish when she first came into the zombie apocalypse and was more focused on the self-preservation of it all. She had a lot of defense mechanisms in place and was only concerned about survival and didn't care about connecting with anyone. She put a wall up and that was how she made it through. Then when she lost Bob and Tyreese, that wall broke down completely and she spiraled all the way down and had to come back up and realize that she was scared but was strong enough to take the risk to connect with people. So after losing Abraham, it's just confirmation that her purpose is not a selfish one. Now she's expanded her understanding of life and those around her. Sasha now sees that her purpose is greater than herself and that perhaps she's not the one to have a relationship. She sees that her service to this world is going to be different than what she originally thought, and she's willing to make that sacrifice."

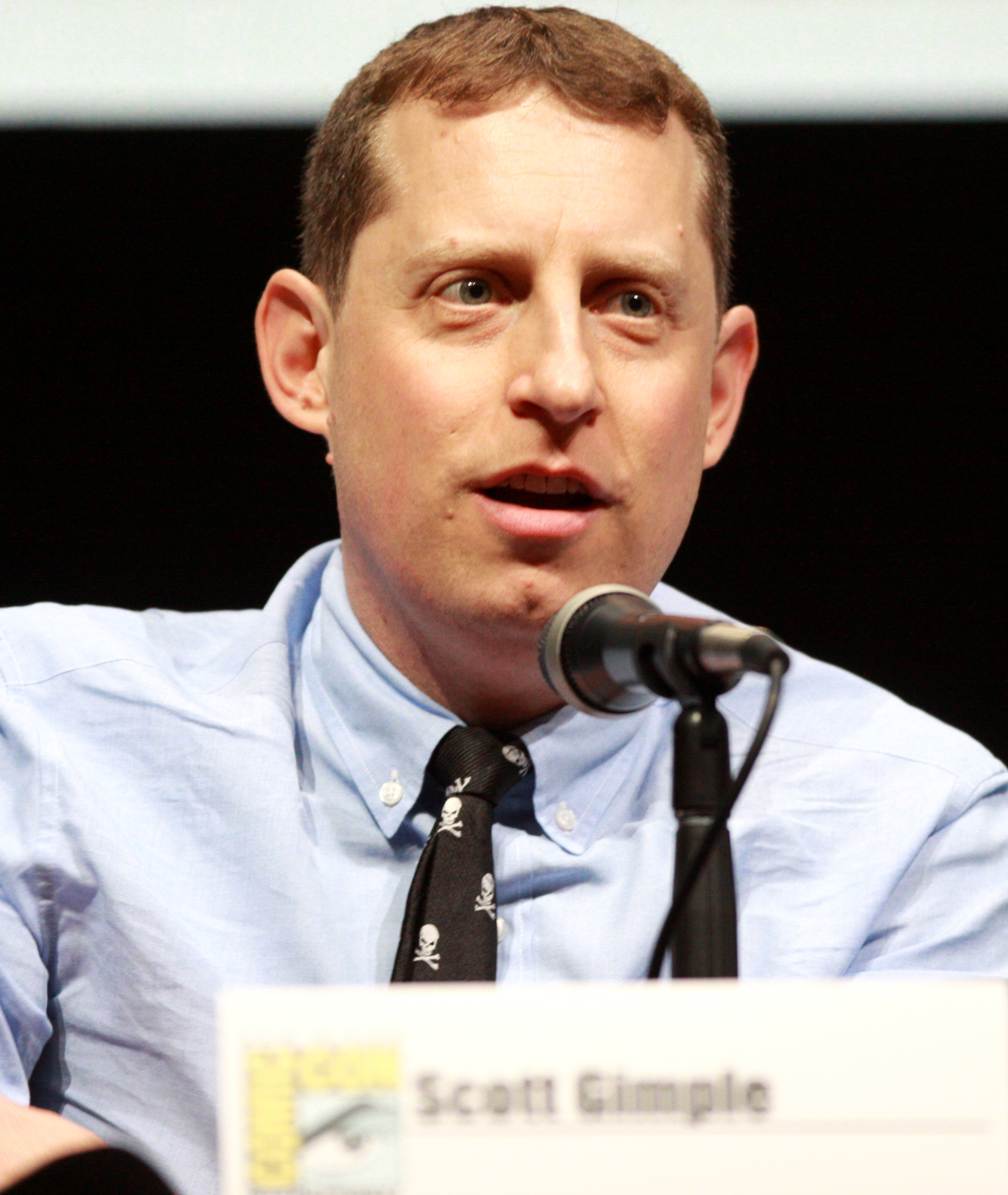
Scott M. Gimple said the death of Sasha was "always about Sasha not being a victim."

Sasha is killed off in the seventh season finale. On Talking Dead, Scott M. Gimple explained that he did not want Sasha to be a victim in her demise. He elaborated, "She had wanted a weapon from Eugene. She wanted a knife. She didn't get one, so she became the knife." Martin-Green explained Sasha's decision to sacrifice herself and felt that it was "right and complete". She said: "It was quite poetic [...] it was the perfect end to my story, the perfect culmination of my life. I felt like all of my roads had led to that moment of getting to that place of complete selflessness. Also, it was beautiful because the way I saw it, that warrior spirit lives on. That even in death, I was still going to fight, because I had realized my purpose. It had been revealed to me. Everything before that had been self-preservation, self-defense mechanisms, basically self-obsession. And over the course of my life as Sasha, it was progressing beyond that to the point that I said, 'O.K., I now have a greater purpose that is much bigger than me, that's for the future, and I'm going to do it even in death.'"

Speculation had arisen over Martin-Green leaving the show to play the role of Michael Burnham on Star Trek: Discovery. However, she dismissed these claims and said: "...what was happening on Walking Dead was already underway. It was the path. It was definitely in place. And then as we were going into the very end of the season, the very end of our shoot for the season --- that's when the opportunity for Star Trek came. And so I know some people might think that I left Walking Dead to do Star Trek, but it did not happen that way. It was after Walking Dead was already ending that the opportunity for Star Trek came." Martin-Green said she was aware of the death of Sasha for a while, though was unaware of the details "until a few weeks before". She said: "I didn't know it would be the suicide pill and the Negan of it all. What Scott did tell me is that it would be heroic and sacrificial and that it would be perfect end to the story. He'd thought about it for a long time and had a vision of it for a very long time."

== Reception ==
=== Critical reception ===
The character was well received. Writing for The A.V. Club, Zack Handlen felt that it made sense for Sasha and Tyreese to start questioning The Governor's motivations in the episode "Prey" because "they're still good people at heart, far more in tune with what Rick and his group are aiming for than the Governor's burgeoning fascism".

Martin-Green received much praise for her performance in the fifth season, particularly the second half. On his review for the episode "Them", Ron Hogan for Den of Geek felt Sonequa Martin-Green delivered the best performance of the episode. For the episode "Forget", he felt that Sasha's breakdown at the party of Alexandria served as the episode's highlight. He said: "A few days ago, she was eating beans out of a can; now she's at a dinner party with people eating potato puffs off little plastic swords and drinking beer like there's nothing happening just beyond those corrugated steel walls. But there is. Sasha knows this, and Sonequa Martin-Green plays this perfectly." He went further to say, "I understand what she's going through completely, and her lashing out makes perfect sense, both in ferocity and in timing." He also felt that the direction complimented Martin-Green's performance. Matt Fowler for IGN also felt the scene involving Sasha was a highlight.

Sasha's character arc and Martin-Green's performance in "Try" were praised by The Independent's Alex Straker. He said: "As a character that has encountered repeated losses in recent episodes, Sasha's downward spiral is wholly authentic, driven by Sonequa Martin-Green's powerful performance." He further assimilated that it was an "interesting turn" in events for the character, regarding her exacerbating mental state. Andy Greenwald for Grantland complimented Martin-Green as "excellent" and "fiery", regarding her portrayal as Sasha as she "throws herself into battle with bloodthirsty gusto".

In the sixth season, John Saavedra for Den of Geek was complimentary of Sasha's growth but critical of her lack of screentime and interactions with Abraham. Writing for the episode "Always Accountable", he said that, "I've enjoyed watching Sasha regain her faith throughout the season. She's come a long way from lying on top of a bunch of corpses in a mass grave to talking Abraham out of an early one", though felt "the issue with her story is that she's rarely on the forefront of anything and is given the same "do I want to live or die?" plot as many of the other secondary characters." He was wary of the development of the relationship between Abraham (Michael Cudlitz) and Sasha, being critical of Abraham as a character and felt that "he has no real purpose on this show anymore. And making Sasha, who is a bit more complex and deserves more screen time than she usually gets, the focus of his affections isn't a solution." Lenika Cruz, writing for The Atlantic was critical of the writing in the interactions with Sasha and Abraham, but complimentary of the actors. She noted the "mixed-metaphor, idiom-heavy speeches" in the "zombie apocalypse" and said "I'm generally not fan of the writing the show does in these one-on-ones, but Sonequa Martin-Green and Michael Cudlitz are strong enough performers to sell subpar lines."

After pursuing a relationship with Abraham, he is killed by Negan, revealed in the seventh season opener. Laura Bradley, writing for Vanity Fair, on the premiere said: "Want to live through the zombie apocalypse? Maybe consider staying away from Sasha." Bradley took sympathy in Sasha's recent tragic loss, saying, "Good god, Sasha!" She went further to assess her tragic losses. "First, her brother Tyreese dies a slow, delirious, heart-rending death. Then, her newly blossoming love interest, Bob, bites the dust—after having his leg cut off and eaten in front of him by a bunch of cannibals. Now her newest love, Abraham, gets beaten to death with a barb wire-covered bat right in front of her. Sure, many of Maggie's loved ones have fallen away in tragic story arcs—but every potential narrative involving Sasha seems to end in premature death. Has Sasha's fate become some kind of sadistic inside joke?"

Writing for Forbes, Erik Kain appreciated the focus on Sasha in "The Other Side". He was critical of the decision to go with Rosita's plan rather than Sasha's plan "to use the sniper rifle to actually, you know, snipe Negan from a distance" rather than Rosita's insistence to "go inside the gate. Because I guess you need a sniper rifle for close quarters combat." Kain was critical of Sasha's decision to save Rosita saying, "If the show had really explained that Rosita was this awesome, essential part of group, I'd be more inclined to agree with Sasha's decision. As it stands, Sasha seems just as integral to the group as Rosita. It makes as little sense as Sasha agreeing to Rosita's plan in the first place, when the sniper plan is so much better. And it just plain sucks that the better character is waltzing off to certain death, while one of the show's worst characters (at least lately) is safe." Writing for The A.V. Club, Zack Handlen liked Sasha's decision to leave Rosita behind, calling it a "nice twist" with "horrible, horrible consequences". Jeff Stone, however, questioned Sasha's actions, believing it to be "manufactured and under-motivated (like Morgan's turn last episode), since Sasha never seemed to have much of a martyr complex, and her major character beat in the series so far was finding a way back from the brink after she became suicidal back in Season 5."

Sonequa Martin-Green's performance was praised in the episode "Something They Need". Josh Jackson felt unlike Masterson, "Sonequa Martin-Green, on the other hand, did a great job. I love the way she responded when Negan's asked if Rick had put her up to the assassination attempt: "Rick? Your bitch? No."" Noel Murray for Rolling Stone said: "The often-underutilized and soon-to-be-Trekkie-fan-favorite Sonequa Martin-Green has been taking full advantage of her increased screen-time over the past two weeks; she does some of her best TWD work to date when Sasha – who didn't die in her suicide raid – sits locked in a Sanctuary cell, pondering her next move." He went further on the Sasha storyline saying, "What's so remarkable about these interactions are the layers of emotions and motivations that Sasha cycles through, from fear and despair to a sense of hope when she realizes she can manipulate the mulleted gent into slipping her a weapon to "kill herself" – which she hopes to use on the big man in charge." Blair Marnell for CraveOnline felt that while it was likely it would be her final appearances on the show, they "have also been a gift to Martin-Green, as she's never been more important to the series than she is now. In last week's episode, Sasha had the really terrific bonding scene with Rosita. This week, Martin-Green carried most of her scenes with Negan and Eugene. She brought the life and fire to this episode, and the series will be poorer for her absence… whenever it eventually comes.

Jeff Stone of IndieWire appreciated that Sasha "went out fighting in her own way". Blair Marnell of CraveOnline felt the episode "gave Sasha a memorable send off…and then it just kept on giving it to her. The intercutting between Sasha's dream reunion with Abe, her time with Negan and Eugene, and her final moments in the coffin was an interesting way to chronicle the last hours of her life. But it went on for far too long." Kevin Yeoman of Screen Rant assessed that Sasha's death served as the episode's highlight. He went further saying, "Her plan, to become a spring-loaded zombie in Negan's coffin [...] worked like a charm and the episode's technique of filling the frame with Sonequa Martin-Green's face while she listened to some Donny Hathaway and reminisced about Abraham set the tone for her departure and suggested that even with the loss everything would be okay. Surprisingly, that's where 'The First Day of the Rest of Your Life' excelled. At making one character's death feel like it meant something after so many of them have increasingly felt like distractions from a go-nowhere plot. In the end, Sasha's death also provided a necessary distraction, one that let Rick and his crew turn the tables on the duplicitous Jadis and her junkyard kids, and finally push back against the bully in the schoolyard. It's just too bad the rest of the hour wasn't as effective as losing Sasha." Elise Nakhnikian of Slant Magazine praised Sasha's final scenes and felt it gave the "most emotionally engaging moments, as it did in "Something They Need."
