= Morgan Jones (The Walking Dead) =

Fictional character

- The Walking Dead character
- Morgan Jones, as portrayed by Lennie James in the television series (left) and in the comic book series (right).
- First appearance: Comic: "Issue #1" (2003); Television: "Days Gone Bye" (2010)
- Last appearance: Comic: "Issue #83" (2011); Television: "All I See Is Red" (2023)
- Created by: Robert Kirkman; Tony Moore
- Adapted by: Frank Darabont (The Walking Dead)
- Portrayed by: Lennie James

In-universe information
- Aliases: Television: Nightingale
- Occupation: Comic: Cook for the Alexandria Safe-Zone; Television: Soldier for the Kingdom (former); Soldier for the Militia (former); Leader of his own group (former); Leader of the Valley Town (former); Co-Leader of the North Texas Alliance (former); Collector for PADRE (former)
- Fighting style: Aikido
- Weapon: Wooden Staff; Battle Axe
- Spouses: Comic: Mrs. Jones †; Television: Jenny Jones †
- Significant others: Comic: Michonne Hawthorne (lover); Television: Grace Mukherjee † (lover)
- Children: Duane Jones † (son); Television: Morgan "Mo" (adoptive daughter)

Morgan Jones is a fictional character from the comic book series The Walking Dead, portrayed by Lennie James in the American television series of the same name and its companion series Fear the Walking Dead. In both the comics and television series, he is a devoted father struggling to get over the recent death of his wife. He and his son, Duane, seek refuge in Rick's hometown after the outbreak occurs and are the first survivors that Rick encounters after awakening from his coma. Morgan is characterized by his catchphrase "you know what it is", which he repeats regularly throughout the television series.

In the television series, Morgan saves Rick's life from a zombie and informs him about the outbreak. They part ways with the intention of reuniting in Atlanta but then lose contact. In the season 3 episode "Clear," Morgan is revealed to be alive when Rick encounters him on a supply run. Morgan has become mentally unstable as Duane was killed by Morgan's undead wife, and refuses to rejoin Rick's group. In season 5, Morgan is shown to have recovered from his mental break and learns that Rick is in Virginia. He eventually reunites with his old friend. In season 6 Morgan acts as a pacifist, insisting that the group can resolve threats without the use of violence, which conflicts with Rick's views. Morgan also tries to help Rick regain his humanity. A flashback episode "Here's Not Here" reveals that after encountering Rick the second time, Morgan met a survivor named Eastman who helped him recover from his mental break, teaching him aikido and insisting that he never has to kill people. An ongoing war diminishes Morgan's commitment to peace, and he reverts to killing. By the end of the war, he leaves the area. It was decided to transfer his character to the companion series Fear the Walking Dead, in which he assumes the role of the series' new protagonist, coming to adopt a new daughter, also named Morgan. In the show's final season, Morgan returns to where he had lost his family and finally faces their loss, putting down a zombified Duane and burying Duane and his wife. At last finding a way to accept his losses with Madison Clark's help, Morgan decides to return to Alexandria with his daughter to reunite with the friends that he had left behind, Rick Grimes in particular.

== Appearances ==
=== Comic book series ===
Morgan Jones, as depicted in the comic book series.

Morgan's son, Duane, spots Rick wandering around their house and, mistaking him for a walker, knocks him out with a shovel. Morgan quickly comes to the realization that Rick is a living human and aids his recovery. He provides details to Rick of the outbreak and what has been happening within the world the past couple months. Rick later supplies him and his son with guns from the Sheriff's station to ensure their protection, and then departs from them to Atlanta.

Morgan and Duane are later shown still remaining within their house several months afterward, during the winter. In an attempt to preserve old tradition and celebrate Christmas with Duane to lift his spirits, Morgan is able to find a Game Boy from a nearby store and give it to him as a present.

Sometime within the following months, Duane falls prey to the walkers, specifically his walker-turned mother, and gets turned. Morgan, unable to cope with the death of his son, resorts to locking Duane in the house with chains. As his mental and physical health deteriorates, he begins murdering survivors who pass by so he can feed the boy. Rick, along with his son Carl and new second-in-command Abraham, arrive back to the town with the plan to bring Morgan into the group, which he agrees to after freeing his zombie son. He quickly develops an intense fixation on Carl, who reminds him of Duane. While in the group, he becomes one of the primary defenders of their campsite, and deepens his bond with Michonne, the two of them both connecting due to their damaged psyches and history of loss. At the same time, he attempts to deepen his bond with Carl after witnessing first-hand the boy's cold-blooded mentality. He believes himself to be responsible for maintaining Carl's childhood innocence and is determined to make amends for his failure to protect Duane.

Once arriving at the new walled-in community named the Alexandria Safe-Zone, he was assigned by the leader Douglas the role of being a chef. He and the rest of the survivors enjoyed the resources that the community offered, however he was one of the few who found himself frustrated with the fake upbeat attitude of their surroundings. After he and Michonne leave the welcome party hosted by the townspeople, the two finally engage in sex. He deeply regrets his actions the following morning, believing himself to be an adulterer and continuing to cling to the memory of his deceased wife. His burdening of ill-conceived principles and refusal to let go of the past angers Michonne, despite their growing attraction towards one another.

Morgan later apologizes for the hindrance in their relationship and reassures her that he is trying the best he can to get over all that has happened. She accepts and the two are able to reunite as lovers once more. Tension between the two of them develops again however, as Michonne becomes insulted by his egocentric demeanor when he justifies their sexual activities as him deserving to be happy.

While helping fight off zombies with Rick, Morgan is caught off guard and bitten on the arm by a walker. Michonne chops his arm off, and from there he is left bedridden. He confesses to Carl his knowledge of the murder committed by him and pleads for him not to let darkness overcome his morality. Michonne later tries to make amends with him, only to discover that he has died from blood-loss. He is shortly thereafter put down by her before he has the chance to re-animate.

=== Television series ===
The Walking Dead								Fear the Walking Dead				
1	2	3	4	5	6	7	8	4	5	6	7	8
Guest		Guest		Recurring	Main			Main				

==== Season 1 ====
In the television series, Rick's hometown - where the Jones' settle - is a small Georgia town called King County. In the series premiere "Days Gone Bye", Morgan examines Rick after his son Duane mistakes Rick for a walker and hits him with a shovel. Rick later wakes up tied to a bed, as Morgan checks Rick for zombie bites or fever, either of which could indicate he is turning into a walker. Morgan initially doubts Rick's status as a living being, going so far as to threaten to shoot him if he does not prove his humanity. After deciding Rick is not a threat, Morgan frees him using a Buck 110 hunting knife and shares what information he has regarding the apocalypse and the walkers.

The following day, Rick tells Morgan that his wife and son are missing and they are most likely alive, since the family photos have been taken from the house. Morgan and Duane tell Rick they may have set off to Atlanta, where the Centers for Disease Control and Prevention has set up a quarantine zone. Rick takes Morgan and Duane to his former Sheriff's headquarters, where the trio use the emergency generator to power up the station. They take hot showers and clean out the armory. Rick heads to Atlanta, while Morgan and Duane stay behind. Rick gives Morgan a rifle and a walkie-talkie and promises to broadcast every morning at dawn. Morgan goes to the top floor of his house, where he looks through old family photos before shooting several zombies. As he hoped, the noise attracts more walkers, including his dead wife Jenny, but Morgan finds himself unable to shoot her and breaks down in tears.

Though Rick broadcasts messages to Morgan at the appointed time, Morgan never responds. After the decision is made to abandon their camp following a walker attack, Rick leaves behind a message for Morgan and a map of where they are going.

==== Season 2 ====
At the beginning of "What Lies Ahead," Rick attempts to contact Morgan over the walkie-talkie one final time without success. Rick warns Morgan that Atlanta is not safe and they are being forced to abandon the city in favor of Fort Benning. Rick expresses hope to see Morgan there someday and almost tells Morgan a secret that Doctor Edwin Jenner at the CDC had whispered in his ear, but ultimately chooses to remain silent on the subject.

==== Season 3 ====
In the episode "Clear", when Rick, Carl, and Michonne go on a run into King County, Morgan holds them at gunpoint from a roof. They have a shootout, and while trying to pursue Rick, Carl ultimately shoots Morgan in the chest. Rick pulls off Morgan's shirt, revealing that he had donned body armor, revealing that he's not actually dead just unconscious. They drag his unconscious-self into his building, avoiding his traps, and lay him down on a bed. For safety measures, his hands are bound by Rick. While Rick is reading the strange writings on the wall, he discovers that Duane had reanimated, and decides to stay and wait for Morgan to wake up.

While Michonne and Carl go on a run, Rick waits for him to wake up, but Morgan grabs a knife that was taped to the side of the bed. He attacks Rick, claiming that he is not familiar with anyone anymore. He stabs Rick in the upper-left chest. Rick knocks the weapon away, pointing his revolver at Morgan's head, and Morgan begs Rick to kill him. Morgan is tied up again and, after patching himself up, Rick finally manages to make him remember that the two know each other. Morgan says that he tried to contact Rick every morning for several weeks, but he never answered the radio, before explaining what happened to Duane.

He is offered the chance to join the group at the prison, but he realizes that Rick is taking a lot of guns, meaning that they are preparing for a war. Morgan claims that Rick, Carl, and his people will die either by bullets or by walkers, and refuses to join them, not wanting to see anyone else die. While clearing out the walkers caught on his traps, Carl approaches Morgan and tells him that he is sorry for shooting him earlier. Morgan remarks to Carl, "Don't ever be sorry." While leaving King County, Rick, Carl, and Michonne watch as Morgan prepares to burn the corpses of the walkers he captured.

Note: Morgan Jones did not appear in The Walking Dead (season 4).

==== Season 5 ====
After the credits in the episode "No Sanctuary", a masked man is seen approaching a Terminus sign Rick had written "No Sanctuary" on. He turns around and pulls off his mask, revealing himself to be Morgan who finds a cross mark on a tree and begins following a trail of them. Morgan reappears after the credits in the episode "Coda" where he follows the tree markings left by Gareth to the elementary school where he and the Hunters had cannibalized Bob Stookey's leg. Morgan puts down a walker pinned under debris and comes across Fr. Gabriel Stokes's church, where he puts together a makeshift shrine and kneels in front of it, praying for a short time before laughing. Morgan finds the map with a route to Washington, D.C., lying on the ground (the one that Abraham Ford had previously given to Rick in the episode "Four Walls and a Roof") and reads the message Abraham had left on it for Rick. Morgan realizes that his friend is still alive somewhere.

In the season finale "Conquer", Morgan is in Virginia and sleeping in a car, before starting a fire. A man approaches him at gunpoint, revealing himself to be a member of the Wolves, and after a brief conversation, demands that Morgan surrender all of his supplies as well as himself. As another Wolves member lunges at Morgan from behind with a knife, Morgan dodges the attack and fights the men with a wooden staff, overpowering them and knocking them unconscious. Morgan places them in the backseat of the car and blows the horn—checking if any walkers are nearby—before departing. When Daryl Dixon and Aaron become trapped in a van surrounded by walkers when they set off a trap laid by the Wolves, Morgan rescues them and Aaron offers him the chance to come to Alexandria as a thank you for saving them. Morgan initially turns down the offer, but says he is lost but on his way to somewhere, and shows Daryl the map to Washington, D.C., with Rick's name on it that he had found at the church. Realizing that Morgan knows Rick, Daryl and Aaron bring him to Alexandria, where they arrive in time to witness Rick executing Pete Anderson under orders from Deanna Monroe following Pete's murder of Deanna's husband.

==== Season 6 ====
In the season premiere, "First Time Again", Morgan and Rick catch up, revealing that he learned how to use his staff from a fellow survivor following the outbreak. Morgan is kept in a room for the night before Rick lets him free, telling him he doesn't take chances anymore. Morgan accompanies Rick in going out of the Safe Zone to bury Pete, when they come across a rock quarry filled with walkers. Morgan helps Rick with his plan to lure the walkers out of the quarry and away from the Safe Zone, knowing it's only a matter of time before they break free. Morgan is present when they walk in on Carter (Ethan Embry) discussing his plans to kill Rick and take the Safe Zone back, holding a gun to Eugene. Rick disarms Carter, telling Morgan that no matter what happens, people like Carter will end up dying. During construction on a makeshift barrier, several walkers stumble into the work zone. Rick wants the Alexandrians to kill them, but Morgan intervenes, saying he doesn't take chances anymore either. As the group are luring the walkers out of the quarry and away from the Safe Zone, a blaring horn is heard coming from Alexandria. This causes the herd of walkers to begin making their way through the woods and back to the Safe Zone, with Morgan, Rick and Michonne running back to Alexandria.

In the episode "JSS", Morgan arrives back at Alexandria after a big rig truck crashed into a tower. He finds out that Alexandria was breached by a group known as the Wolves, who are brutally slaughtering everyone they can in Alexandria with an arsenal of blades. Morgan rescues fellow survivor and reverend Gabriel, who is attacked by a Wolf. Morgan begins securing Alexandria, fighting off other Wolves before being encircled by a group of Wolves. The leader of the pack recognized Morgan from their previous encounter. Morgan asked the Wolves to leave, but instead the Wolves attacked him. One by one the Wolves were knocked down by Morgan using only his staff in hand. He informs the Wolf that his people have guns and they would be shot if they didn't leave. The Wolves finally comply as they realize they can't win. Once the Wolves left Alexandria, Morgan surveys the carnage left behind by the attackers. He went inside a house the Wolves ravaged and was ambushed by who appears to be the leader of the Wolves. A fight ensued between them in the living room, and eventually Morgan was able gain an upper hand to subdue the Wolf leader and knocked him unconscious.

The episode "Here's Not Here" reveals how Morgan regained his sanity and learned his martial arts skills from a survivor named Eastman. After Rick left Morgan in King County, it's revealed that Morgan began attacking and killing anyone he came across. When he comes across Eastman, he was knocked unconscious and locked inside a cell in the cabin. While Morgan initially rebuffs Eastman's attempts to get to know him and help him move past his trauma (constantly telling him, he's going to kill Eastman when he gets out), Morgan eventually calms down and listens to Eastman's philosophy. From then on, Eastman taught Morgan how all life is precious as well as teaching him Aikido to allow him to defend himself without resorting to lethal force. The episode shows how Eastman died from a walker bite, but Morgan carries his peaceful ways on with a promise to never kill again. The episode ends with Morgan shown to have been telling the story to the Wolf leader (locked in his basement) in an attempt to convert him in turn.

In the episode "Heads Up", Morgan admits to Rick and Michonne that he let the Wolves escape, believing that people can change, though Rick doubts his ability to survive without getting his hands dirty. Morgan later visits Denise Cloyd and gains her help in treating the Wolf he captured. In the mid-season finale "Start to Finish", when Alexandria's walls are breached by a horde of walkers, Carol and Morgan take shelter in Morgan's house. She finds the captive Wolf, and threatens him with a knife, but Morgan intervenes and they fight, allowing the Wolf to escape.

In the mid-season premiere "No Way Out", the escaped Wolf is killed while saving Denise from walkers. When the Wolf reanimates, Morgan kills it and apologizes. In the episode "Not Tomorrow Yet", Morgan tries to talk the group out of attacking the Saviors, but Rick is determined to kill them all. With the strike force gone on their sneak attack, Morgan is seen back in Alexandria welding bars together to make a new detention cell. In the episode "Twice as Far", Morgan is seen reinforcing his jail cell, telling Rick it will give them options in the future. In the episode "East", after Carol goes missing, both Morgan and Rick set out to find her. They find an unknown man, whom Rick decides to shoot after the man asks for his horse, but Morgan stops him. The man is already gone by the time Morgan explains to Rick how everything is a cycle and by sparing the Wolf leader he kept in Alexandria, Denise was saved and was able to save Carl. The two then part ways with Rick giving Morgan a gun and telling him to come back once he finds Carol.

In the season finale "Last Day on Earth", Morgan continues to search for Carol. He finds the missing man's horse and is pleased to see he was telling the truth. Soon, he finds Carol, who has been shot twice by one of the Saviors. When the man moves to shoot Carol, Morgan kills him by repeatedly shooting him and then moves to help Carol when the man he and Rick encountered before returns with a friend. Morgan returns his horse and the men agree to help get Carol to safety.

==== Season 7 ====
Morgan first appears in the second episode of the season, "The Well", where it's revealed that the men he encountered at the end of last season brought him and Carol to a community known as The Kingdom. After Carol wakes up from a long sleep, Morgan introduces her to the leader of the community, King Ezekiel and his pet Bengal tiger Shiva. While Carol dismisses Ezekiel's masquerade as a true medieval king as ridiculous, Morgan seems more open-minded. He begins to become more involved in the community, helping feed their pigs and dispatch walkers. Ezekiel, impressed by Morgan's skills with the staff, asks him to train Ben, a young survivor who is very important to him. Morgan is reluctant at first as he reasons the stick couldn't have saved Carol, but he eventually agrees.

While training Ben, Morgan allows Ben to borrow The Art of Peace a book Eastman gave him and states that he is struggling with his beliefs as he was forced to kill again to save Carol, but still continues to value life. Morgan is later present when Ezekiel and other members of the Kingdom give tribute to the Saviors with Ezekiel expressing his desire to fight and defeat the Saviors. The episode ends with Morgan escorting Carol to an abandoned house outside the Kingdom where they part on amicable terms before Morgan heads back. Morgan reappears in the mid-season finale "Hearts Still Beating", where Carol sees him leaving fruit by her door. She calls him inside and shows him Ezekiel has already brought plenty of fruit, before asking him how he is. When he responds that he's good, she then tells him to leave. The two are then approached by Ezekiel's adviser Richard, who asks for their help in convincing Ezekiel to launch a preemptive strike against the Saviors. Morgan refuses as he doesn't want to be the one to break the peace. When Carol reiterates that she just wants to be left alone, Morgan replies that she was never supposed to see him before leaving.

In "Rock in the Road", Morgan is reunited with Rick and the others when they are brought to the Kingdom by Jesus. He tells them that he found Carol, but she left a short time after being in the Kingdom. He later sits in on Rick's meeting with Ezekiel, where he asks the Kingdom to join their fight against the Saviors. Ezekiel asks Morgan for his opinion and Morgan admits that he believes war isn't the answer and suggests they find another way. This sways Ezekiel to turn down Rick and the group leave the Kingdom soon after (though Daryl stays behind in order to better hide from the Saviors). In "New Best Friends", Morgan is present at the next tribute to the Saviors when tensions escalate between Richard and Jared. When guns are drawn, Morgan and Ben use their staffs to stop Jared who then takes Morgan's staff. Despite this, he continues to disagree with Daryl who advocates war.

Morgan's moral conundrums come to a head in "Bury Me Here", when during a tribute, the Kingdom comes up short. To make an example of the Kingdom, Jared shoots Benjamin. They rush him to Carol's but Ben succumbs to his injuries and dies. Benjamin's death causes Morgan to become distraught and begin to lose his grip on reality (with flashbacks of King County flashing through his mind). When he realizes Richard engineered the situation, he confronts him. Richard claims it was supposed to be him, but that they can use Ben's death to rally the Kingdom. The next day, while compensating the Saviors, Morgan snaps and attacks Richard, stunning him with his staff before strangling him to death (shocking both sides). Morgan explains that Richard was behind Ben's death and is able to placate the Saviors. He then goes to see Carol and reveals what happened as well as telling her the truth about everyone the Saviors killed. He claims he's going to kill them all, one by one, but Carol convinces him to stay. The episode ends with Morgan sharpening his staff into a spear, symbolizing his abandonment of Eastmen's ideals in favor of violence.

In "The First Day of the Rest of Your Life", Morgan is found by Ezekiel, Carol and a group of Kingdom survivors en route to Alexandria, donning Benjamin's armor and wielding his spear. Ezekiel asks him if he is determined to erase who he was with Morgan claiming he doesn't wish it, but is "stuck" (implying his inability to live in their world with both his life and values). Ezekiel convinces him to march with them to Alexandria. When they arrive, they join the Alexandrians in battle against the invading Saviors. During the battle, Morgan kills several Saviors (saving Rick at one point), making liberal use of both firearms and his spear. He is later seen sitting in silence, after the battle, where he is comforted by Carol (as both have been forced into killing again).

==== Season 8 ====
Morgan appears in the season premiere "Mercy" where he is part of Tara and Jesus's group of soldiers, assigned to attack several Savior compounds. "The Damned" shows the attack commencing with Morgan leading the attack, assuaging doubts by claiming "I don't die", a reference to his loved ones constantly dying while he survives. Morgan is shown to kill numerous Savior during the attack before encountering Jared, Benjamin's killer, again. He is about to kill him when Jesus stops him, stating they've surrendered. "Monsters" shows Morgan's group leading the captured Saviors back to Hilltop as prisoners. Jared continues to bait Morgan, but he refrains from taking action. When the prisoners attempt an escape, Morgan kills one of them, but is stopped by Jesus from killing the others. Their disagreement over killing leads Morgan to attack Jesus, leading to a heated fight. Despite seemingly being evenly matched, Jesus manages to disarm Morgan before returning his staff. Morgan claims "I know I'm not right. But that doesn't make me wrong" before leaving the group.

Its subsequently shown that Morgan chose to take up a post watching the Sanctuary instead of actively fighting in the war. In "Time for After," Morgan helps lay down covering fire for Daryl and Rosita's attack on the Sanctuary, helping them break through the walls with a garbage truck and allowing the herd inside. When Rick later arrives with the Scavengers, he finds the sentries dead, the Sanctuary clear of walkers and no sign of Morgan. In "How It's Gotta Be," Morgan is revealed to have survived the Saviors retaliation and makes his way back to the Kingdom in time to overhear Gavin threatening Ezekiel while the Kingdom is overrun with Saviors.

In a flashback in "Honor," Morgan witnesses the Saviors escape the Sanctuary and quickly flees. At the Kingdom, Morgan teams up with Carol to rescue Ezekiel and kill the Saviors who have taken over. Together, Morgan, Carol and a liberated Ezekiel kill the Saviors and reclaim the Kingdom. Morgan captures Gavin, the high-ranking Savior lieutenant responsible for Benjamin's death and prepares to kill him despite the efforts of Carol and Ezekiel to convince him otherwise. Before Morgan can kill Gavin, Gavin is suddenly killed from behind by Benjamin's younger brother Henry to the three's shock. Subsequently, in "Dead or Alive Or," Morgan dodges questions from Henry about his brother's killer and contemplates telling him the truth. After finding out that Carl died helping a stranger, Morgan lies to Henry that Gavin was Benjamin's killer and as such, Henry already got his revenge.

During "Do Not Send Us Astray," Morgan is haunted by hallucinations of Gavin telling him that it should've been Morgan that killed him. Morgan participates in the defense of the Hilltop Colony and helps to repel the attack and then to deal with the reanimated residents who have been turned by the Saviors' tainted weapons. Afterwards, Morgan is saddened to learn that Henry is missing.

In "Still Gotta Mean Something," Morgan joins Carol in a search for Henry and continues hallucinating, this time of a dead Henry. Overwhelmed and having found a walker with Henry's fighting stick impaled through it, Morgan gives Henry up for dead and abandons Carol to continue the search on her own. Morgan tells Carol that "I don't die, I just see it" and feels that he can't save anyone he cares about. Instead, Morgan joins Rick's efforts to track down the escaped Savior prisoners which include Jared. The two men are captured by the Saviors, but Rick tries to convince the Saviors to release them as a herd of walkers are coming. When the herd arrives, Rick and Morgan are released and then turn on the Saviors, killing several of them. Morgan has a final confrontation with Jared, ending with Morgan trapping Jared and ensuring he is devoured by walkers, getting his revenge for the murder of Benjamin. Morgan and Rick discuss their first meeting and Morgan explains that his choice to save Rick at the time stemmed from the fact that his son was with him. Upon returning to the Hilltop, Morgan is shocked but relieved to find that Carol found and rescued Henry. Morgan informs Henry that he got revenge upon Benjamin's killer, but Henry just apologizes after seeing Morgan's state.

In "Wrath," Morgan's mental state continues to deteriorate, causing him to now hallucinate Jared and accidentally knock Henry over while going after Alden and the freed Savior prisoners who were returning from a legitimate errand for the Hilltop. Morgan continues his aggressive stance towards the Saviors, slaughtering a group that the Militia ambushes while Jesus tries to console Morgan to take a less violent stance, using the blunt end of his stick for the living and the pointed end for the dead. During the final battle with the Saviors, Morgan nearly kills a subdued Savior, but instead decides to take Jesus' advice at the last moment and knocks out the man. After listening to Rick's speech to the gathered communities, Morgan hands over Benjamin's armor to be given to Henry and decides to go his own way for a while so he can move on and heal away from other people. Morgan extends an offer from Rick for Jadis, the former leader of the Scavengers, to join Alexandria so that she doesn't have to be alone. Jadis, revealing her real name to be Anne, accepts his offer while Morgan stays by himself in the Junkyard that had acted as the home to the Scavengers.

=== Fear the Walking Dead ===
==== Season 4 ====
Shortly after the war with the Saviors, Morgan is visited in the Junkyard by Jesus, Carol, and Rick who all separately attempt to get Morgan to return with them. Rick warns Morgan that no matter how far he runs, he will eventually find himself with people again. Subsequently, Morgan leaves the Junkyard and begins working his way west, ending up in Texas where he meets John Dorie. After running into a hostile group of survivors, the two men are rescued by a journalist named Althea and are then captured by Victor Strand, Luciana Galvez and Nick and Alicia Clark. At first, Morgan attempts to stay out of the affairs of his new friends, aside from attempting to convince Nick to let go of his path of vengeance which ends in Nick's death. After hearing the story of John and his love for the woman he knew as Laura, Morgan decides to go after his new friends and attempt to stop their war with the Vultures, to no success. To save John's life after he gets shot, Morgan, Al, June, who is the woman John knew as Laura and a young girl named Charlie return to the Dell Diamond baseball stadium where Alicia's group had formed a community before it was destroyed by the Vultures. Morgan helps get the needed medical supplies and uses his own experiences to talk Alicia out of getting revenge on June and Charlie.

At the beginning of the second half of the season, Morgan decides to return to Alexandria to tell Rick that he was right: Morgan did find his way back to people after all. During this time, Morgan's group discovers that a series of truck drivers led by a man called Polar Bear have been leaving supplies along the roadways for anyone who needs them. However, a powerful hurricane hits, separating the group. While taking refuge in a semi-truck during the storm, Morgan is accidentally transported to Mississippi where he makes three new friends in Jim, Sarah and Wendell. The group makes their way back to Texas, leaving boxes of supplies belonging to the original truck driver along the road for other survivors, but come into conflict with a woman named Martha who was driven insane after losing her husband in a car accident when no one would help her. After Jim is bitten and dies, and Martha is defeated, Morgan chooses not to return to Alexandria. Instead, Morgan decides to take over a denim factory and use it and the resources Polar Bear left behind to help other survivors in need. The rest of the group chooses to join in with Morgan's efforts instead of going their separate ways or to Alexandria.

==== Season 5 ====
Morgan continues to lead the group in helping other survivors. In "The Hurt That Will Happen," Morgan's group meets a woman named Grace. Once the situation is defused, Grace explains that a walker Morgan had struggled with is radioactive due to a reactor meltdown at a nearby power plant. He and Grace begin to fall in love as a group called the Pioneers threatens them with subjugation. In the season finale, the group is captured and separated by Virginia. Morgan is shot by Virginia but records a final message to his group, telling them to move on and do good. He passes out as walkers approach him, leaving his fate unknown.

==== Season 6 ====
After narrowly surviving his gunshot wound, Morgan subsequently dedicates himself to building a new community in the valley and adopts a willingness to be more violent as he reunites his friends and engages in conflict with the Pioneers. When Morgan captures Virginia, he chooses not to go through with the execution after remembering the other people that he's killed. Instead, Morgan convinces everybody to let Virginia live with her actions and invites anyone who is willing to follow the rules to join his new community. Many of Morgan's friends decide to join him, but Strand declines, instead opting to lead the Pioneers, insisting that a grave threat that Virginia has been preparing for is still out there. Morgan banishes Virginia and Dakota from his community, but a vengeful June executes Virginia with John's gun, believing that Virginia is responsible for her husband's murder as Virginia had covered up for Dakota even after knowing what she was capable of. After Grace's daughter is stillborn, Morgan learns of the threat poised by Teddy Maddox and teams up with Strand to stop him from launching nuclear warheads from a beached submarine. However, Strand wants to prove to Alicia he is a hero and tries to sacrifice Morgan to walkers on the sub so he can stop Teddy alone. The scuffle only buys Teddy the time he needs to launch the missiles. As the group flees, Morgan and Grace nearly commit suicide together after declaring their love for each other. However, when they discover their friend Rachel has sacrificed her life to save her infant daughter Mo, Morgan adopts Mo on the spot as they take shelter from the bombs in the sub.

==== Season 7 ====
Morgan and Grace try to eke out a living based in the sub despite the nuclear wasteland around them. Morgan learns that Strand has built a community in a tower in a habitable zone, with Strand placing all the blame for Teddy's destruction on him. Morgan tries to assassinate Strand for his crimes but is foiled, with Grace and Mo forced to take up residence in the Tower. Morgan reunites with Alicia who has formed her own group, and they prepare to declare war on Strand. On the eve of the conflict, Grace orders Morgan to flee with Mo into the Gulf of Mexico to find a habitable place for them to live. Morgan complies, but arrives on a beach on the Gulf Coast where Mo is kidnapped by PADRE, an organization of child traffickers. Morgan encounters Madison Clark, who survived her apparent death and is now working for PADRE. After Morgan tells her that Nick is dead and Alicia appears to be as well, Madison agrees to help him infiltrate PADRE to rescue Mo, with Morgan pretending to be a willing recruit.

==== Season 8 ====
In "Remember What They Took From You," following his arrival at PADRE, which is located on an island in Georgia, Morgan successfully rescues his daughter Mo with the help of Madison. However, seven years later, an imprisoned Madison discovers that Mo has been returned to the island and is now known as "Wren." Escaping from PADRE with Mo, Madison encounters Morgan who has willingly given up Mo to PADRE, feeling that she is safer with them. For Mo's own protection, Morgan attempts to distance himself from her and clashes with Madison about his actions. Morgan has become a Collector for PADRE, taking children for them like Madison did, but he privately admits to Madison that, rather than just kidnapping kids, Morgan only takes kids who have no family or whose parents willingly give them up in the hopes of a better life.

As Mo discovers her true parentage, she joins Morgan and Grace in going on the run from PADRE. They journey to King County where Morgan finally puts down Duane, who he left as a walker after he was bitten, using the rifle that Rick had given to Morgan on their first parting. Morgan is then finally able to lay his family to rest, burying them and promising not to take so long to visit them again. Morgan reveals that he doesn't remember much of his period of insanity, having blocked it all out. This includes Morgan returning to the house where Duane had died and moving his son, chaining Duane up in the attic of the house where Morgan and his son were living when Rick had first met them. However, Grace, who now has terminal cancer from her radiation exposure before Morgan ever met her, is bitten while protecting Mo. Morgan races to get Grace treatment from June but Grace ultimately dies in Mo's care, forcing Morgan to put her down after Grace reanimates and attacks their daughter. A heartbroken Mo declares her intent to return to PADRE to escape the pain of her loss, causing Morgan to relapse into much of his old insanity. However, he is pulled out of it by Mo and Madison while the others defeat PADRE's leaders. Madison helps Morgan to finally understand that the ones you lose are always with you, seeming to finally end Morgan's cycle of loss and insanity.

Convinced that his friends are in good hands with Madison, Morgan decides to return to Alexandria and the friends that he had left behind there and to stop running from his past. After a final goodbye with Madison, Morgan returns to Eastman's cabin with Mo where he buries Grace by his old friend and talks to Eastman's grave about how much he's learned since losing him. Now truly at peace with his losses, Morgan experiences flashbacks of fond memories with Jenny, Duane, Eastman, Benjamin, Nick, Isaac, Rachel, John Dorie, John Dorie Sr., Alicia and Grace - the people that he's lost along the way - and broadcasts an open message to Rick that he's coming to find him, promising that he'll rebroadcast the message and leave the radio open for a few minutes each day at dawn, echoing Rick and Morgan's promise to each other during their very first parting.

=== The Walking Dead: Destinies ===
Morgan also appears in the video game The Walking Dead: Destinies, playing a similar role to his appearance in the first and third seasons of the TV show. However, unlike the comics and TV versions of Morgan, this Morgan is never mentioned to have had a son.

After awakening from his coma, Rick meets Morgan who teaches Rick some of the rules of the new world and helps him to retrieve clothes and a car to go to Atlanta and find his family. Morgan decides to remain behind in King County when Rick leaves.

Rick/Shane later returns to King County in search of weapons with which to defend the prison from the Governor of Woodbury. Having gone insane after the loss of his wife, Morgan attacks Rick/Shane, but is talked down when he reaches the building upon which Morgan is shooting from. Morgan allows Rick/Shane to take the guns, but he refuses to go with him to the prison which Morgan states will fall and that it's only a matter of time. Morgan remains behind in King County, declaring that he has to continue to "clear."

== Development and reception ==
Lennie James played Morgan in the series premiere "Days Gone Bye". Mike Ryan of Vanity Fair described Morgan in his review of the episode as "scared shitless of zombies breaking in, which seems like a reasonable reaction". Liz Kelly and Jen Chaney of The Washington Post commented on Morgan and Duane, "whose loss of the mother figure in their family reminded us a little of "Lost's" Michael and Walt". Josh Jackson of Paste described Morgan and Duane as being "tormented by Morgan's wife walking the streets outside the suburban home where they're squatting. Unable to put her out of her misery or move on without her, they're frozen in place, tormented by loss that hasn't really gone away.

It's the most nightmarish of scenarios – hunted by the shell of a loved one – the zombies aren't generic; this one is personal." Jackson also stated that Rick is "shell-shocked by the world he wakes up to and Morgan serves as his shepherd into reality". Leonard Pierce of The A.V. Club described Morgan as "beautifully played by the always welcome Lennie James" and adding that he "adds a moment of poignancy, as he finds himself actually apologizing for having not killed his now-reanimated wife". Pierce describes the scene in which Morgan "tries to gather the—strength? resolve? compassion?—to destroy what used to be his wife" as a "wrenching" scene. Kris King of Starpulse noted that Morgan "has a powerful scene involving the fate of his wife and his grizzly attempt to come to terms with his loss". Writing for The Atlantic, Scott Meslow describes what he considers "the episode's most devastating scene", in which "Morgan aims at [his wife's] head through a rifle from a window, almost pulling the trigger several times before collapsing in tears. Morgan's fate is a dark reflection of Rick's worst fears; with his wife and son missing, and with no way to contact them, Rick never knows if he'll turn a corner and find a grotesque perversion of the wife and son he loves."

It was confirmed on November 19, 2012, that Morgan would be returning in Season 3. In an interview with Inside TV, Robert Kirkman defines the title of the episode "Clear", and how it relates to Morgan: "It means a lot of things. To a certain extent it's the ravings of a lunatic but it's also about him trying to clear out his life and clear out any entanglements around him. He's living by himself so he's trying to have a clear head. It's basically about him getting rid of his wife and getting rid of his son and the only way for him to survive is to clear the area around him." Kirkman also felt that Lennie James was "really playing a completely different character and doing completely different things in this episode and is just as amazing doing it. So it was a lot of fun having him back and also having him do things that were so different from what he had done before." In his recap of the episode for the Los Angeles Times, Emily VanDerWerff called Lennie James a "brilliant actor", and felt that "his role is significant enough that he essentially becomes the main supporting player in the piece". Eric Kain of Forbes called the performance of Lennie James "absolutely riveting", noting that Morgan "is a changed man, and not for the better"; Kain called Morgan's refusal of Rick's offer to return to the prison with him "a glorious scene". Zack Handlen of The A.V. Club describes Morgan's situation: "Morgan's crime is that he couldn't let go of the past; he couldn't shoot his dead wife, and so his dead wife eventually killed his son. So now he has nothing to live for, but he doesn't have the strength of will left to take his own life. Which leaves him trapped. He can't join up with Rick's group, no matter how much Rick wants him to, because that would mean connecting with people again, becoming vulnerable, risking himself and having to suffer when his new friends die. And he can't commit suicide, because that would require a different kind of courage. So he's stuck building his traps, covering the walls with his writing, sending messages to strangers he'll never see."

On November 26, 2017, it was announced on Talking Dead that Lennie James would be exiting The Walking Dead and transitioning the role of Morgan to Fear the Walking Dead.

Noel Murray of Rolling Stone ranked Morgan Jones 4th in a list of 30 best Walking Dead characters, saying, "Over the past few seasons, the survivors have had less use for such a gentle, philosophical soul, but the show still badly needs Morgan – both to prove that it's possible to stay alive without sacrificing every principle and that it pays to speak softly and carry a big staff."
