= Strangers (The Walking Dead) =

- The Walking Dead episode
- Bob's leg is amputated and eaten by Gareth and the Terminus survivors.
- Episode no.: Season 5 Episode 2
- Directed by: David Boyd
- Written by: Robert Kirkman
- Cinematography by: Michael E. Satrazemis
- Editing by: Avi Youabian
- Original air date: October 19, 2014

Guest appearances
- Chris Coy as Martin; April Billingsley as Theresa; Chris Burns as Mike; Benjamin Papac as Albert; Travis Young as Greg

Episode chronology
← Previous "No Sanctuary"	Next → "Four Walls and a Roof"
- The Walking Dead season 5

"Strangers" is the second episode of the fifth season of the post-apocalyptic horror television series The Walking Dead, which aired on AMC on October 19, 2014. The episode was written by series creator Robert Kirkman and directed by David Boyd. In the episode, Rick Grimes (Andrew Lincoln)'s group encounters a priest, Father Gabriel Stokes (Seth Gilliam), who provides them solace in his church, while Rick contemplates Abraham Ford's (Michael Cudlitz) proposition to escort Dr. Eugene Porter (Josh McDermitt) to Washington, D.C. to cure the walker virus.

"Strangers" features the debut of Father Gabriel Stokes, a major protagonist of the graphic novels of the same name. Commentators gave the overall episode positive reviews, but most gave an alarmed response to the episode's ending scene, with some calling it one of the show's most shocking moments.

Upon airing, the episode was watched by 15.14 million viewers and received an 18-49 rating of 7.7, down a whole ratings point from the previous episode, which attained an 18-49 rating of 8.7.

== Plot ==
Rick's group continues to flee from Terminus, although Daryl senses that someone is following them. They rescue Father Gabriel Stokes (Seth Gilliam) from a horde of walkers, and Gabriel shows them to his church, where he has been living in solitude since the onset of the apocalypse, surviving on canned food from a food drive just prior. Rick is suspicious of Gabriel, and warns his son Carl that he should never let his guard down.

Gabriel suggests that Rick's group help scour a nearby food bank that is overrun by walkers. Rick, Michonne, Bob, and Sasha join Gabriel as he leads them there. They start to deal with the walkers, when Rick sees Gabriel seemingly ready to submit to a female walker, but Rick dispatches the walker first. Bob is also attacked by a walker, but he is rescued by Sasha. As they collect the salvageable food, Rick realizes Gabriel knew the person that became that walker. The other members of the group do their own supply runs, and Daryl and Carol find a working car nearby, which they plan to save as "backup". When Rick returns with his group, Carl shows him writing scratched into the woodwork of a windowsill outside the church: "you'll burn for this".

The group celebrates that night with a feast. Rick announces that he has decided to follow Abraham's proposal to head to Washington, D.C. to deliver Eugene there to help work a cure for the outbreak. Afterwards, Tara confesses to Maggie about her affiliation with the Governor and the prison attack, for which Maggie forgives her. Meanwhile, Gabriel sneaks off to be alone in his office, sadly looking at a photo of himself with the woman that became the walker from the food bank. Carol, who is still coming to terms with being exiled and the events of The Grove, leaves and goes to the car she found earlier. Daryl follows her and asks what she is doing. She replies she doesn't know, and Daryl asks her to come back with him. Just then they see a car race by with a white cross in its back windshield, which Daryl recognizes as the car that took Beth. The two get in the car and set off to follow without telling the others.

As the feast dies down, Bob steps outside the church, weeping. He is knocked out by a hooded figure and when he wakes up, he finds himself watched by Gareth, Martin, and four other Terminus members, all seeking revenge toward Rick's group as their actions forced them to abandon Terminus and wander. Gareth says they have devolved into "hunters" and the shot expands to show that they have cut off Bob's left leg and are eating it. Gareth casually states, "If it makes you feel any better, you taste much better than we thought you would."

== Production ==
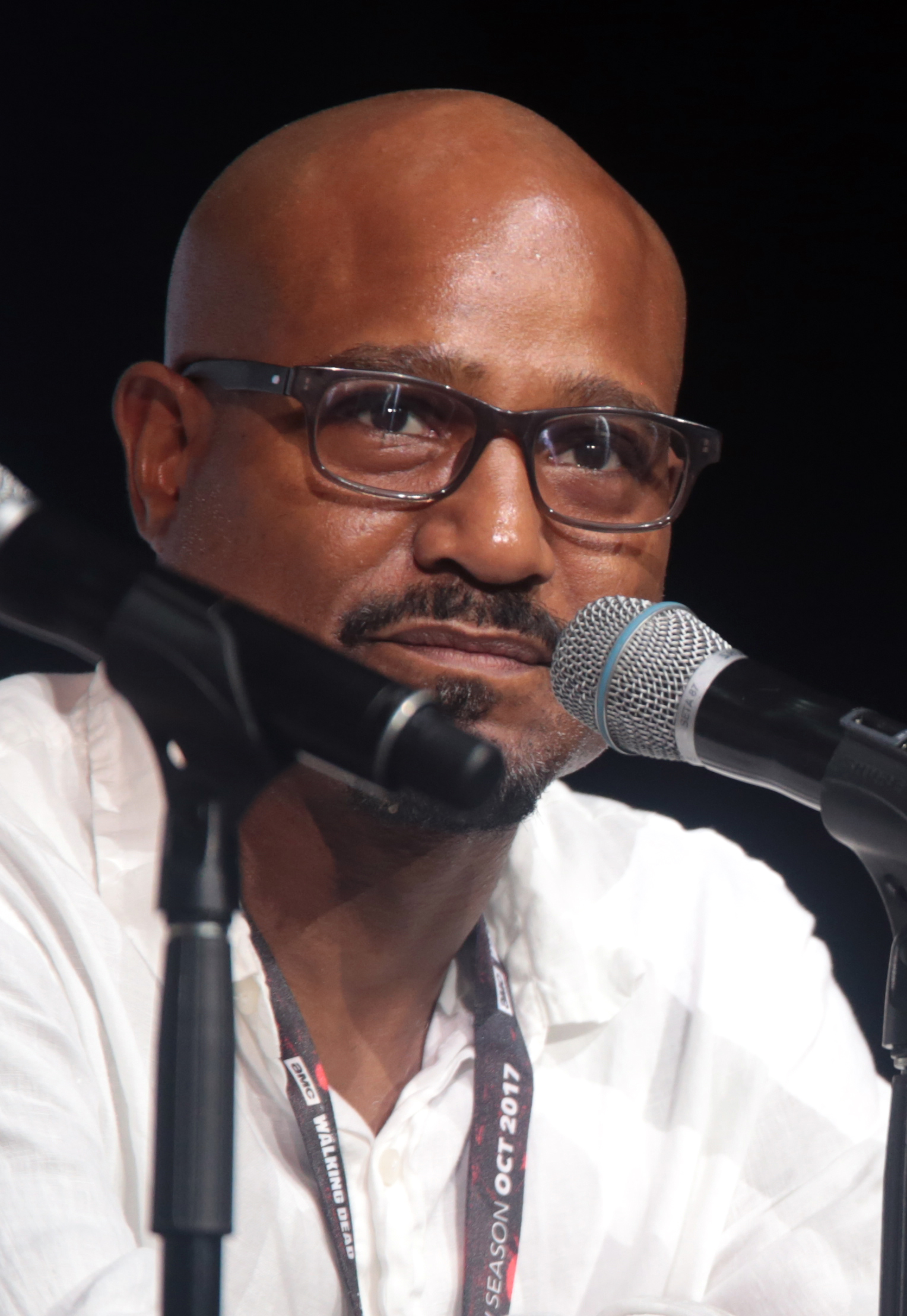
Seth Gilliam made his first appearance as Ft. Gabriel Stokes in this episode.

Actor Andrew J. West addresses Gareth's presence in the episode, saying: "I read that script and when I got the last couple pages, I was just shocked — but in a good way. I was smiling from ear to ear. All Scott [M. Gimple] had told me was that I was in episode two. I kept reading and got to the final pages and my God. I'm a fan of the comic book, too, so that was informing what I was reading and I recognized certain things. But it was a huge surprise and a pleasant one at that for me to be able to get to do something like that."

Certain elements of this episode were produced to resemble certain elements in "Volume 11", "Issue #63" of the comic book series, including:

- The group's arrival at Father Gabriel's church.
- Gareth's monologue in final scene (resembling Chris in that issue of the comics).
- The shot of Bob discovering that his left leg is missing (resembling Dale without his leg in the comics).

Actor Andrew Lincoln (and others working with the show) insisted in an interview with Entertainment Weekly that "It's a grown-up show this season. And some of the violence is moving into a territory where it's human violence, the most scary aspect of this show."

== Reception ==
Upon airing, the episode was watched by 15.143 million American viewers, with 9.796 million viewers aged 18–49 watching it, which translates to an 18-49 rating of 7.7.

Commentators gave the episode very positive reviews, with many commenting on the introduction of Father Gabriel and the ending scene featuring Bob and Gareth. Rebecca Hawkes of The Telegraph gave the episode 4 stars out of 5, calling the episode "beautifully surreal." She continued to say that the show "often excels at action-packed high drama, but it's the quieter episodes that really reinforce the reality of life in a post-apocalyptic world – the idea that survival is one long slog."

Matt Fowler of IGN gave the episode an 8.8 out of 10, saying "Normally, since most of my issues with The Walking Dead involve character beats and decisions, I tend to dread the "come down" episodes a little bit. But "Strangers" managed to juggle the large ensemble very well while also keeping the story fresh and dangerous. The episode also raised legitimate questions about how to handle new faces on the road now that it's a clear given that people are far worse than the undead in this new world."

The ending scene was given alarming reaction from critics. Andrew J. West's performance as Gareth was highly praised and liked how close it played to the comic. Kyle Ryan of Entertainment Weekly said "Last week's explosive (literally) episode piled on the gore, pyrotechnics, and emotion so relentlessly that what followed it couldn't help but slow the pace considerably. But that doesn't make "Strangers" slow or easy to watch: The gross-out scene Greg Nicotero giddily anticipated delivered in suitably nasty fashion, and the ending pulled a nice fake-out with Bob before delivering him to the former Terminans, now all but officially known as the Hunters." Allen St. John of Forbes pondered whether or not this was the most shocking moment ever on the series, saying "Yes, I know that this is a show in which a 13-year-old kid shoots his mother to keep her from turning into a walker. And one in which Rick bit open the neck of a would-be killer. And the less said about what happened at The Grove, the better. And somehow, this moment has been worse than any of them. Bob being eaten alive by a hipster. (Before writing poor Bob's obituary, note that Hershel survived a good long time on one leg.)" Terri Schwartz of Zap2it gave similar comments, saying "surprisingly Father Gabriel Stokes wasn't the biggest arrival in the episode. Though he is a man who -- as is repeatedly said in the series -- clearly has something to hide, it's the reveal that Gareth and the Terminans have turned into the Hunters from "The Walking Dead" comics that is the most skin-crawling, stomach-turning moment in the episode;" Lisa Respers France of CNN simply stated "how gross was that?" Patrick Kevin Day of The Los Angeles Times compared Bob's fate to that of Mrs. Landingham's from The West Wing, saying "the former army medic who has battled his demons in the past, but seemed to have at long last found love with Sasha [...]. Suddenly, Bob was everywhere this episode, smiling and smooching and looking like the love in his heart was enough to fight back the apocalypse around him. We should have known that he was about to get Mrs. Landingham-ed."
