= Four Walls and a Roof =

- The Walking Dead episode
- Rick and Sasha confront a kneeling Gareth, moments before killing him.
- Episode no.: Season 5 Episode 3
- Directed by: Jeffrey F. January
- Written by: Angela Kang; Corey Reed
- Cinematography by: Stephen Campbell
- Editing by: Julius Ramsay
- Original air date: October 26, 2014

Guest appearances
- Chris Coy as Martin; April Billingsley as Theresa; Chris Burns as Mike; Benjamin Papac as Albert; Travis Young as Greg

Episode chronology
← Previous "Strangers"	Next → "Slabtown"
- The Walking Dead season 5

"Four Walls and a Roof" is the third episode of the fifth season of the post-apocalyptic horror television series The Walking Dead, which aired on AMC on October 26, 2014. The episode was written by Angela Kang and Corey Reed, and directed by Jeffrey F. January. In the episode, the group of Rick Grimes (Andrew Lincoln) prepares for a showdown with Gareth (Andrew J. West) and his group of Terminus residents. Meanwhile, following his leg being amputated and eaten by Gareth's group, Bob Stookey (Lawrence Gilliard Jr.) is on the brink of death from a walker bite sustained in the previous episode.

The episode marked Lawrence Gilliard Jr. and Andrew J. West's final appearances as regular actors on the show. It also features the climax and deaths of the notable comic book villains "The Hunters", which was praised by critics for its quick conclusion and fast pacing.

== Plot ==
Gareth and the other remaining Terminus members taunt Bob as they eat his left leg. Gareth expresses his anger towards Carol, who killed his mother, and states that they saw Carol and Daryl drive off together as they were approaching the church. They had planned to capture and eat Rick and the rest of his group, but Gareth says Bob will "do just fine." Bob starts laughing, and tells them that he was bitten the previous day. The Terminus group starts panicking, fearing they will turn. Gareth knocks out Bob to stop his hysterical laughter.

At the church, as they realize that Bob, Carol, and Daryl are missing, Sasha confronts Father Gabriel about their whereabouts. Gabriel cannot answer, but this leads to Rick questioning him about the fate of his congregation. Gabriel is forced to admit that when the apocalypse started, he had locked his congregation out of the church and allowed them to be killed by walkers.

The group hears a noise outside, and finds Bob there, having been left there by the Terminus group. Bob tells them about his bite mark, Gareth, and Carol and Daryl's absence, and Gareth's presence nearby. Rick wants to stay until Carol and Daryl return, but Abraham refuses to risk Eugene's life. Glenn convinces Abraham to stay 12 more hours and promises to leave with him should Carol and Daryl not return by then. The group prepares to defend against Gareth, and Sasha instructs Tyreese to watch Bob and prepare to stab his head with a knife should he die.

At night, Rick and some of the group leave to search for Gareth, but Gareth and his group are hiding nearby. They break into the church while Rick's group is out of sight, but Rick and the others were lying in wait and return. Two of the Terminus members are killed before Rick and the others hold Gareth and the others at gunpoint. Gareth begs for mercy, promising not to eat any more of Rick's group. Rick tells him that if they don't feed on his friends, they will find someone else to feed on. Rick reiterates his previous vows to Gareth, stating that he "already made him a promise", and proceeds to kill him. Rick, Sasha, Michonne, and Abraham slaughter the remaining Terminus group, much to the horror of the others, and to Gabriel's anguish due to the carnage occurring in the "Lord's house". Maggie tells him that the church is just "four walls and a roof". Michonne recovers her stolen katana from the bodies.

Bob survives until morning, where the group says their goodbyes to him. He dies in Sasha's arms before Tyreese stabs him. Bob is buried with Gabriel's other parishioners. Abraham prepares to set out with Eugene, Rosita, Glenn, Maggie, and Tara. Abraham gives Rick a map of their route to Washington D.C. As they leave, Rick sees that Abraham left an encouraging message for Rick to follow as soon as they can.

That evening, Michonne is talking to Gabriel, who is still distressed about the violence he saw. Michonne hears a noise in the nearby bushes and Daryl appears. Michonne asks him about Carol, and Daryl turns to a nearby bush and instructs someone to come out.

== Reception ==
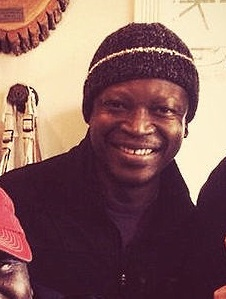
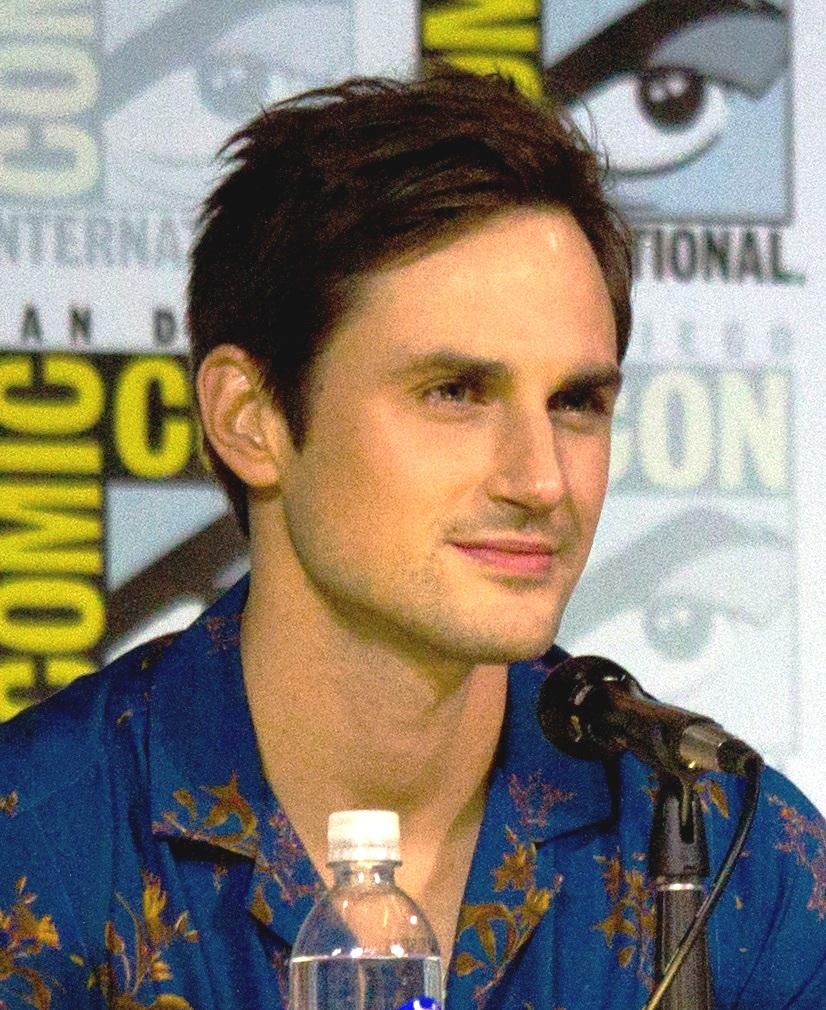
Lawrence Gilliard Jr. (left) and Andrew J. West (right) made their final appearances in "Four Walls and a Roof" as series regulars, playing Bob Stookey and Gareth, respectively.

Upon airing, the episode was watched by 13.801 million American viewers with an 18-49 rating of 7.0, a decrease in viewership from the previous week which had 15.143 million viewers with an 18-49 rating of 7.7.

In the United Kingdom, the episode was viewed by 1.147 million viewers, making it the highest-rated broadcast that week. It also received 0.062 million timeshift viewers. In Australia, it received 0.107 million viewers, making it the highest-rated cable broadcast that day.

Zack Handlen of The A.V. Club gave the episode an A grade.

Matt Fowler of IGN gave the episode an 8.6 out of 10, saying the episode "once again showed us what a powerful force Rick's group can be by having them pretty much annihilate Gareth's posse in one fell swoop. Everyone's on the same page, morality-wise, and their fighting skills are, for far, unrivaled. Which is why it's frustrating to see them get cut in half and split off into two separate storylines at the end. I do understand that the show can't realistically handle such a giant ensemble always being together in one spot, but I just wish I'd bought more into the reasons for the split."

Alan Sepinwall of HitFix said "this was another effective, pulpy episode, and a good illustration of the ways "The Walking Dead" has improved itself over time." With regard to the church massacre, he said "I appreciated both that the writers didn't keep the cannibals around as a long-term threat — and excuse for wallowing in the sadism of what they do (even if Gareth doesn't see it that way) — and that Rick didn't turn out to be nearly as stupid as they wanted him to seem when he led most of the good fighters away from the church when that was so obviously what Gareth wanted him to do. The massacre of the remaining Termites[...] was brutal, and illustrated how cold and rough Rick can be when you push him to this point."
