= No Sanctuary (The Walking Dead) =

- The Walking Dead episode
- Rick modifies a sign leading to Terminus with mud to read "No Sanctuary".
- Episode no.: Season 5 Episode 1
- Directed by: Greg Nicotero
- Written by: Scott M. Gimple
- Cinematography by: Michael E. Satrazemis
- Editing by: Julius Ramsay
- Original air date: October 12, 2014

Guest appearances
- Lennie James as Morgan Jones; Denise Crosby as Mary; Tate Ellington as Alex; Chris Coy as Martin; Robin Lord Taylor as Sam; Justice Leak as Knife Smock Man; Adam Boyer as Bat Smock Man; Owen Harn as Crazed Man; Anissa Matlock as Woman; Nelson Bonilla as Terminus Guard

Episode chronology
← Previous "A"	Next → "Strangers"
- The Walking Dead season 5

"No Sanctuary" is the fifth season premiere of the post-apocalyptic horror television series The Walking Dead, which aired on AMC on October 12, 2014. It was written by showrunner Scott M. Gimple and directed by Greg Nicotero. In the episode, Rick Grimes' (Andrew Lincoln) group struggles to figure out a way to escape Terminus, whose inhabitants have resorted to cannibalism to survive. Concurrently, Carol Peletier (Melissa McBride) devises a plan to rescue Rick's group after learning they are in danger.

The episode featured several recurring guest stars, including Lennie James, who makes a brief uncredited post-end credits appearance as Morgan Jones, in his third overall appearance in the show. This episode was critically praised; most applauded its action, story progression, emotional aspect, and Morgan's return, although several viewers were disturbed by the graphic nature of the episode. Upon airing, the episode hit series-high ratings, with 17.29 million viewers; the episode also garnered an 18-49 age bracket rating of 8.7. The show achieved its previous series-high ratings during the fourth-season premiere, "30 Days Without an Accident", which garnered 16.11 million viewers. The episode is considered by critics and audiences to be one of the show's best, citing the fast-paced action, dark themes, and performances by the lead cast as high points.

== Plot ==
In a flashback, Gareth, Mary, Alex, and other members of Terminus are held captive in a train car by a group of murderers and rapists. A member of Terminus is taken, and the three vow to take revenge.

Trapped in the train car, Rick and his group are flashbanged, knocking them out. Rick, Daryl, Glenn, Bob, and several other unnamed survivors wake up gagged and bound inside a butchering room to be killed and prepared for consumption. While the other captives are being murdered, Rick vows to Gareth that he will kill him. Right before a butcher can kill Glenn, they are interrupted by gunshots and an explosion.

Carol, Tyreese, and Judith follow the tracks to Terminus. They hide from a walker herd and encounter Martin (Chris Coy), a Terminus member. On Martin's radio, they hear that Rick's group has been captured. Carol heads to Terminus while Tyreese watches over Judith and Martin in a nearby cabin. Carol ignites a propane tank near a fence, creating a breach for walkers to enter. Inside the butcher room, Rick frees himself and kills the butchers. Rick, Daryl, Glenn, and Bob raid the armory and kill several Terminus members. Amidst the chaos, they search several train cars. From one of them, a crazed man screams to Glenn that his people and Terminus are the same before being killed by a walker.

Carol confronts Mary, who tells Carol Terminus initially began as a true sanctuary, but became hostile and cannibalistic after being betrayed by the group that held them captive. Carol shoots Mary in the leg. Mary pleads for her life by insisting that Terminus' actions were justified, but Carol leaves her to be devoured by walkers. Back at the cabin, Martin continuously antagonizes Tyreese for his pacifism. Suddenly, Martin escapes his restraints and grabs Judith, threatening to kill her unless Tyreese exits the cabin, where a walker is attempting to break in. Martin leaves the cabin but is ambushed by Tyreese, who brutally beats him.

Carol reunites with Rick and his group in the forest. Rick decides that they must get as far away from Terminus as possible. As the group travels the tracks, Rick smears a Terminus sign to read "no sanctuary".

In a post-credits scene, Morgan finds the altered sign some time later. Morgan then begins following symbols carved into the trees.

== Production ==
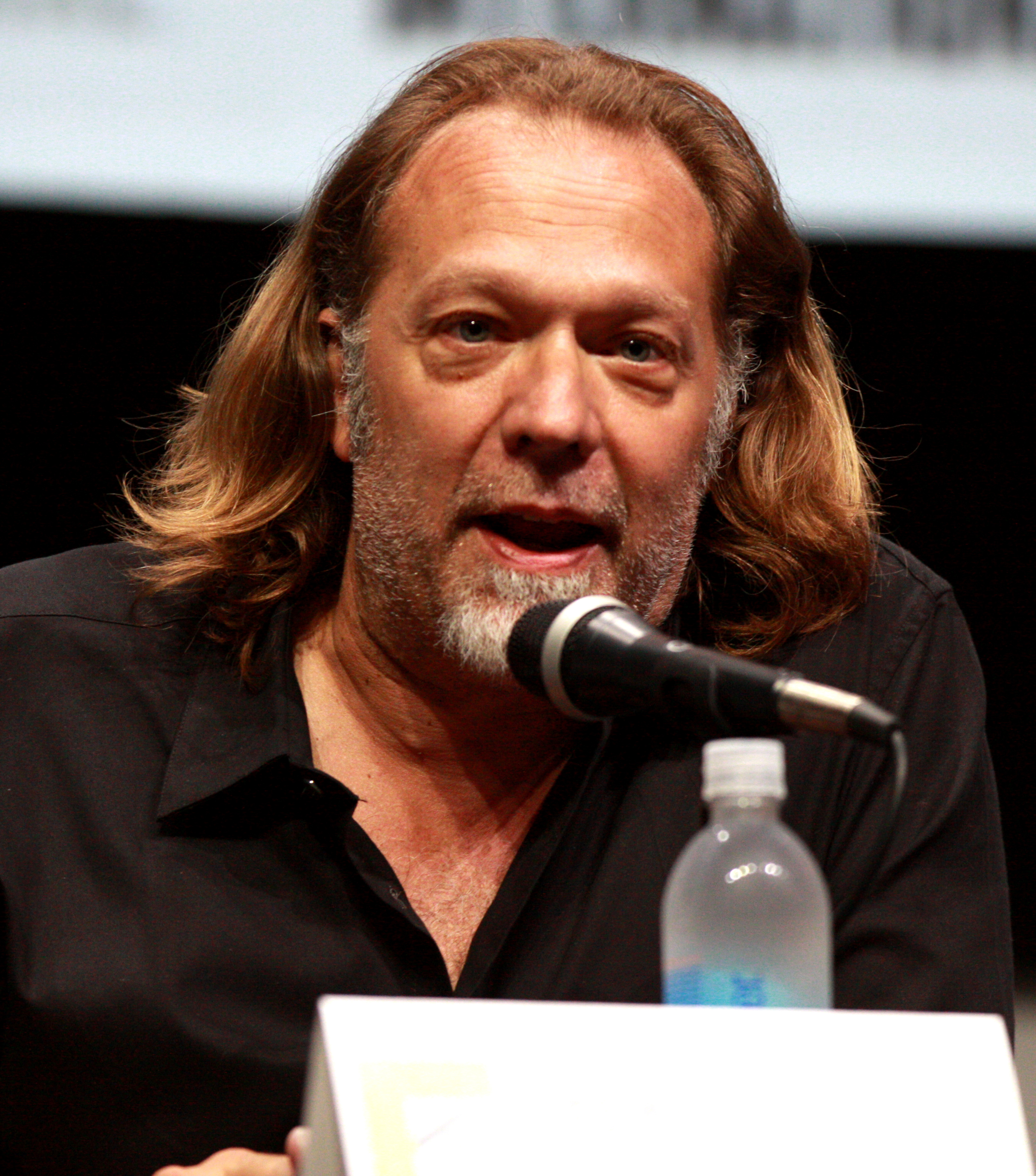
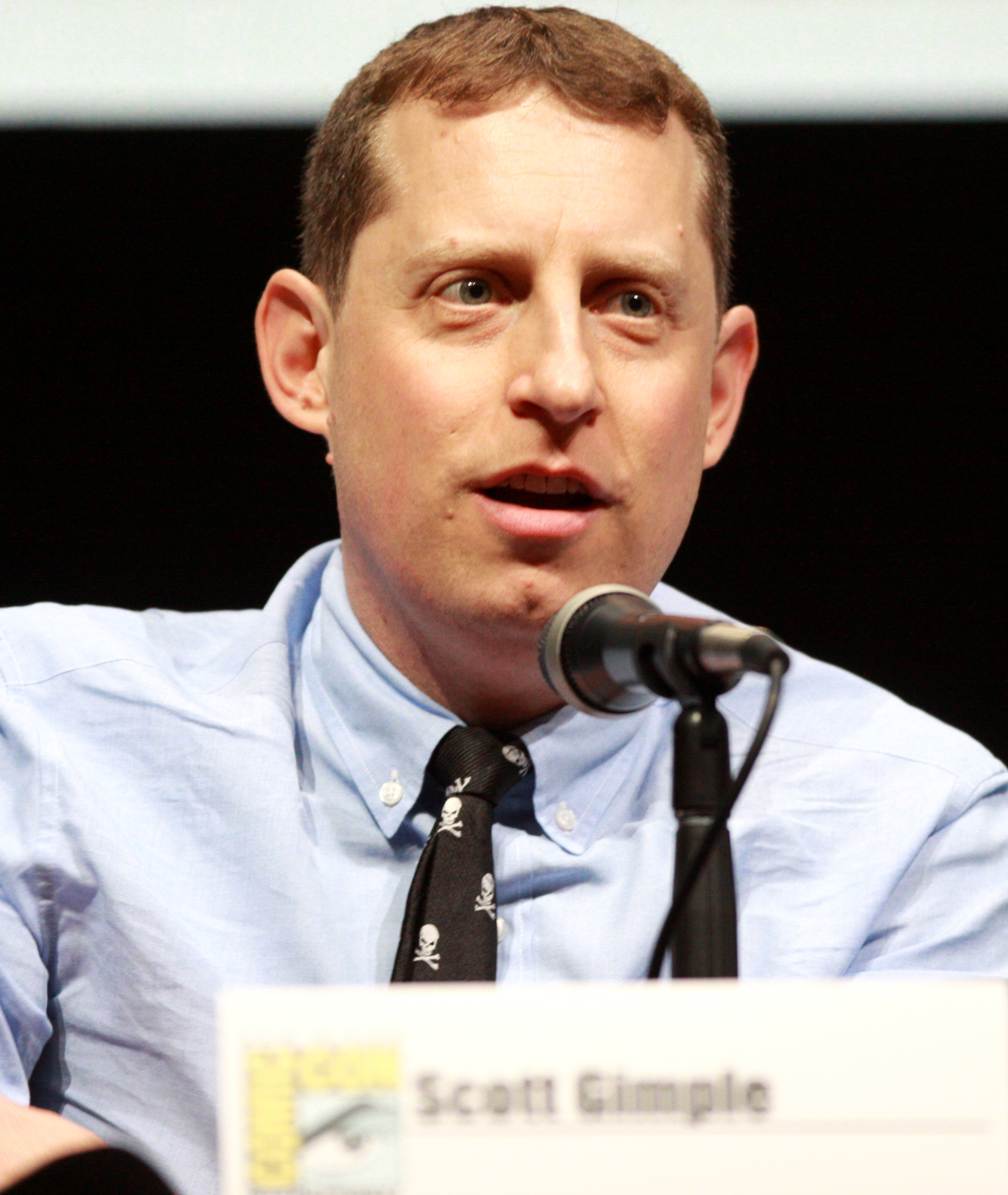
Executive producer Greg Nicotero (left) served as director of "No Sanctuary", which was written by series showrunner and executive producer Scott M. Gimple (right).

"No Sanctuary" was written by executive producer and series showrunner Scott M. Gimple, and directed by executive producer and special make-up effects supervisor Greg Nicotero. Nicotero was expected to direct three additional episodes in the fifth season. "No Sanctuary" marked the first episode that featured Michael Cudlitz, Josh McDermitt, Christian Serratos, Alanna Masterson, and Andrew J. West as series regulars; they reprise their roles as Sgt. Abraham Ford, Dr. Eugene Porter, Rosita Espinosa, Tara Chambler, and Gareth, respectively, from the fourth season.

Several cast and crew members warned the audience of the graphic content of the episode. Prior to the episode's release, certain scenes were reported to have been cut from the official broadcast, having been deemed too disturbing. The scenes remaining in the episode have been met with comparable observations by the show's actors. Steven Yeun, who portrays Glenn Rhee, said:

I remember a couple of scenes I would look over at what was going on in the scene and I would be like, ‘What the eff? What are we doing? How is this legal? It's grounded and real, too; it's not like torture or gore for no reason. It's literally, that is what would happen and we are trying to show it. It would not work on network television, let me tell you that.

Lauren Cohan, who portrays Maggie Greene, made similar comments regarding the episode, saying some of the scenes were "so disturbing", she did not think they would make it on TV. The series' composer, Bear McCreary, tweeted to parents of young children: "Do not let children watch The Walking Dead tonight. Or ever again. I'm very serious", as he is aware of the show's younger fans. Despite his warning, McCreary said that "No Sanctuary" was his "favorite episode in years, and, [in my honest opinion], the scariest score I've ever done." Series creator and executive producer Robert Kirkman stated that the episode's opening presented to the audience the threat that the characters face, although he said, "[It] actually adds a tremendous amount of value to the story, and so that’s what justifies these great lengths that we go to to, you know, disgust the audience." Gimple said that there was concern of the graphic nature of the episode, but both he and the network eventually felt it was necessary for the episode's plot, and that it contained meaning within the story. He also stated that the disturbing acts of the people in Terminus were important to convey the terror of "institutional evil", saying:

Seeing such a pronounced, bloody, horrific thing being done by men who are completely dispassionate about it, and who are merely just having another day at the office, that this is their version of “time to make the donuts.” I think there’s something terrifying about that institutional violence. Institutional evil, I think, is the scariest stuff. And as they go down the line, and we see that there isn’t a personal stake in it, I think we become very cognizant of, well, these aren’t people we can talk out of this. They don’t really have much emotion to it. This is almost like dealing with a machine. It’s very, very terrifying — these people are no longer really people. And I think it was important to portray that very early in the season.

"No Sanctuary" can be seen as a transitioning stage for Rick Grimes, who has accepted his brutality whilst retaining his humanity, after attempting to live a peaceful life in the fourth season. Andrew Lincoln, who portrays Rick, said: "there's something about getting dirty, sweaty and bloody that feels right." The episode also featured several reunions in the group - siblings Sasha and Tyreese and baby Judith with Rick and Carl - that were organized by Carol Peletier, who enabled the events that helped the group escape Terminus. Gimple noted that Rick would not respond positively to Carol's return had she not been responsible for assisting in their escape and reuniting him with his daughter. He also believed that the reunions reinforced Rick's motivations in his actions: "for the survival of his children and the sake of love." "No Sanctuary" also displays Tyreese's aversion to violence, and his reluctance to step up, despite being "almost the most powerful" among the primary characters. Kirkman believed that his ability to become violent to survive, such as killing all the walkers outside the cabin with his bare hands, terrifies him, which could be seen as his weakness; Kirkman stated that this will be explored throughout the fifth season.

The episode introduced a "Then and Now" structure, which utilizes flashbacks that bookend the episode; flashbacks were used in previous seasons of the television series, and were sparsely used in the graphic novels the series is based on. Although Gimple stated that this feature would not be seen throughout the season, he said, "We definitely play with time this season. And we’ll be jumping around a little bit, but I believe this is our only Then and Now." Kirkman noted that the audience "[knows] so much more about Gareth and all of those people because of those two very minor scenes." Gimple knew the backstory of Terminus while the characters were traveling there in the previous season, and stated that it echoes what happens next to Rick's group. The writers wanted to divulge and formulate the "whole story" of Terminus that affects the characters of the show; he related the stories of everyone in their universe to "walking ghosts of Christmas Future and ghosts of Christmas Past to [the] characters."

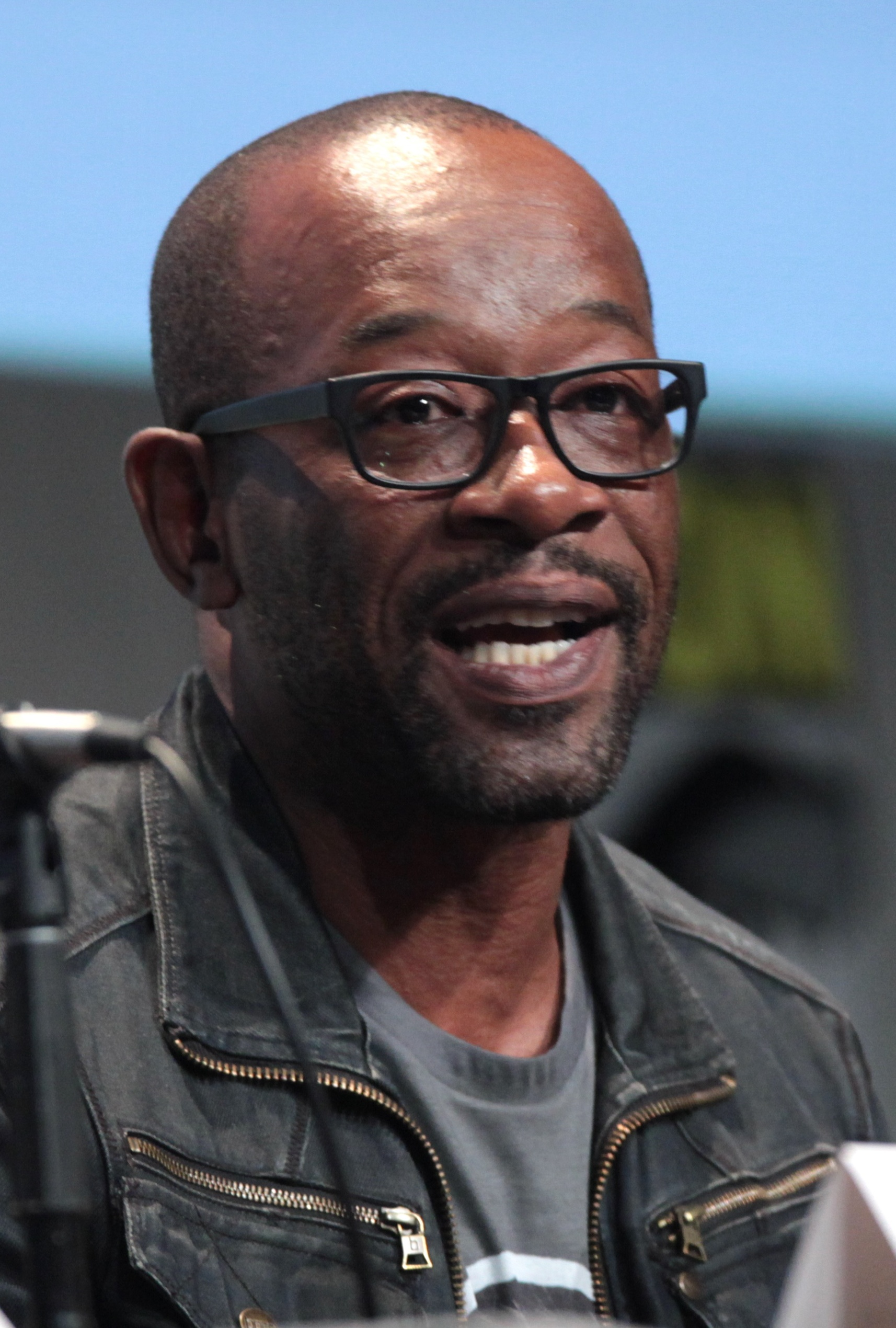
The episode featured Lennie James' (pictured) third guest appearance as Morgan Jones in the television series.

The episode featured the return of Lennie James as Morgan Jones in a brief uncredited post-end credits cameo. It marked his third appearance in the show, after the pilot, "Days Gone Bye", and the season three episode "Clear". Gimple explained in an interview with The Hollywood Reporter that Morgan's appearance was the "beginning of something" for the character, but would not state further; he instead said, "Looking at him, how he's dressed, how he's acting — it's not a 42-minute episode there — but you get some hints about where he's at. I would look at that carefully." In an interview with Entertainment Weekly, he also noted that Morgan was "definitely dressed better than the last time we saw him. He looks pretty well put together. You know, he’s not talking to himself. I would say that, just laying eyes on him, it looks like a different Morgan." Kirkman stated that Morgan was possibly following Rick's trail, as Rick left him a map in "Clear". He also said that the post-credits scene was used not only to surprise the audience, but to also "[sequester the] story of this episode...into its own contiguous piece."

"No Sanctuary" featured several homages to various horror films. The episode's opening scene involved primary characters Rick Grimes, Daryl Dixon, Glenn Rhee, and Bob Stookey being brought to a slaughterhouse and lined up over a trough with other Terminus captives, who are violently hit over the head with baseball bats before their throats are slit to drain their blood. Nicotero said during an interview in the aftershow Talking Dead that the scene was inspired by the film Alien (1979), particularly the "chestburster" scene. "[Director] Ridley Scott they had blood tubes hooked up and nobody knew what was going to happen...When they rolled six cameras and Veronica Cartwright gets hit with all the blood, all those reactions were real," stated Nicotero, who also opted to use practical effects in filming and kept the true nature of the scene hidden from the actors. Another scene involved Rick's group escaping from the slaughterhouse and passing by several crates, one of which read: "Arctic Expedition Horlicks University, Attn: Julia Carpenter". Nicotero, who usually inserts several Easter eggs in the episodes he directs, added this as an homage to the film Creepshow (1982) and its director, George A. Romero, who worked with Nicotero in Day of the Dead (1985).

Alongside the episode's opening, several scenes utilized practical effects. During Talking Dead, Nicotero said that one of his favorite walkers was the one who fed on the nose of a Terminus resident; the crew used a puppet that was lit on fire as a walker, while a stuntman who portrayed the walker's victim wore a silicone mask that protected him from the fire. The walkers Carol Peletier and Tyreese encounter on the train tracks in the beginning of the episode were rotting; this was indicative of Nicotero's intention for the walkers in the fifth season to look more skeletal, with several body parts missing. In the episode's climax, Carol blows up a propane tank to attract walkers to Terminus and distract the captors there. In filming the scene, the special effects team custom built the tank out of foam to control the size of the explosion.

Some fans initially thought that a walker Carol killed in the beginning of the episode was a zombified Andrea, a major character who was killed off in the third-season finale. However, Laurie Holden (who portrayed Andrea) disproved this as did Nicotero, who felt that it would have not been an appropriate conclusion for Andrea and explained that the walker was portrayed by the wife of the director of photography, Michael Satrazemis. Several fans also believed that the crazed man Glenn freed, who was swiftly killed, was Negan, a primary antagonist of the graphic novels, although this was also disproved by Gimple, who noted that Negan does not have a ponytail, and Nicotero, who said:

"He's one of the dudes that took over Terminus...At the end, when they go back into the train car and you see them, that's the same guy. When they're saying, 'You're either the cattle or the butcher,' Mary says, 'We put the signs up because we did want to save this place and want it to be a sanctuary and then they took it away.' Them being willing to take people in, it was the biggest mistake they made and it turned them. That's a big theme on the show because it shows how you can start out as a good person and with a few flips of the switch, be not such a good person."

In the same interview, Gimple stated that the crazed man's backstory might be explored, including a possibility that the man's group was part of a larger group, although Nicotero added, "It's a big world. There are others but you'll have to wait and see."

== Reception ==
=== Ratings ===
The show delivered series-high ratings, with 17.29 million American viewers and an age 18-49 rating of 8.7. Including DVR viewership, the episode was watched by 22.37 million viewers, with 14.52 million aged 18–49. This placed the show first for cable viewing for the week.

In the United Kingdom, the episode was viewed by 1.152 million viewers, making it the highest-rated broadcast that week. It also received 0.082 million timeshift viewers. In Australia, it received 0.098 million viewers, making it the highest-rated cable broadcast that day.

=== Critical reception ===
The review aggregator website Rotten Tomatoes reported an approval rating of 100%, based on 15 reviews. The website's critical consensus reads: "In The Walking Dead's season five premiere, 'No Sanctuary' delivered an action-packed resolution to last season's cliffhanger while deepening our understanding of Rick and Carol."

Brian Lowry of Variety gave the fifth-season premiere a positive review, writing:

After the (rather too) long and winding road to Terminus, "The Walking Dead" opens its fifth season in spectacular fashion, a dazzling adrenaline rush filled with suspense, righteous violence and, before it's all over, genuine emotion. Imbued with cinematic touches, the only downside to this breathtaking episode is pondering what the creative brain trust can do for an encore. Still, AMC's megahit finds itself in a very good place, from the current makeup of its ever-evolving cast to the latitude it has earned to take unexpected detours. Given the hype surrounding the series, it's still impressive to see the producers deliver such a feast.

Zack Handlen of The A.V. Club gave the episode an A− grade, writing:

What's most striking about "No Sanctuary," apart from its attempts at thematic resonance, is how quickly and brutally the question of Terminus is resolved. If you'd asked me beforehand, I would've guessed that it would take at least a couple of episodes before Rick and the others could free themselves. I wouldn't have been exactly excited about that, because the longer you stay in a community full of murderous cannibals without any major character being killed, the more the tension just drips away, but it seemed like a reasonable assumption to make, especially when taking into consideration how tricky it was going to be to build the rest of the season. Without the prison home base or an obvious major villain (goodbye, the Governor), we need something to create structure—a group of psychos who harvest human flesh seems like too good a concept to dispose of immediately.

Matt Fowler of IGN rated the episode 9 out of 10, writing that the episode "was a madhouse spectacle of violence and mayhem that gave our heroes a big win and a well-earned reunion. While last season's 'Indifference' and 'The Grove' elevated Carol's character, 'No Sanctuary' made her even more fan-accessible by using her no-nonsense approach to the zompocalypse as a way to shift her into full warrior mode". He also said that the beginning scenes in the episode "featured the most gripping, intense moments".

Terri Schwartz of Zap2it not only gave the episode a positive review, but she also commented on the emotional aspect of the show, writing: "It's truly an impressive feat of storytelling when a show like 'The Walking Dead,' now entering its fifth season, can continue to tell a fresh story that delivers increasingly effective emotional payoffs. Such was the case in the Season 5 premiere, 'No Sanctuary,' which ended with one of the best uplifting moments of the entire series."

In his 4 star review, Vulture's Richard Rys wrote: "If this episode is any indication of what's ahead in season five, it's gonna be an ugly, bloody ride." In yet another 4 star review, Rebecca Hawkes of The Daily Telegraph wrote that the episode "was a powerful season opener that blended the expected quantities of gore and action with one of the show's starkest statements yet about the moral realities of its post-apocalyptic world. As one of the cannibals observed, 'You're either the butcher or the cattle.' By the time the end credits started to roll, her world view felt undeniably true".

=== Accolades ===
The episode and its sound mixers, Michael P. Clark, Gary D. Rogers, and Daniel J. Hiland, received a 2015 Cinema Audio Society Award nomination for "Outstanding Achievement in Sound Mixing for Television Series – One Hour".
