= Fear the Walking Dead season 8 =

Fear the Walking Dead
- Season 8
- Promotional poster
- Showrunners: Andrew Chambliss; Ian Goldberg
- Starring: Lennie James; Kim Dickens; Colman Domingo; Danay García; Austin Amelio; Karen David; Christine Evangelista; Jenna Elfman; Rubén Blades; Daniel Sharman
- No. of episodes: 12

Release
- Original network: AMC
- Original release: May 14 – November 19, 2023

Season chronology
- ← Previous; Season 7

The eighth and final season of Fear the Walking Dead, an American horror-drama television series on AMC, premiered on May 14, 2023, and concluded on November 19, 2023, consisting of twelve episodes. The series is a companion series to The Walking Dead, which is based on the comic book series of the same name by Robert Kirkman, Tony Moore, and Charlie Adlard. The executive producers are Kirkman, David Alpert, Greg Nicotero, Gale Anne Hurd, Scott M. Gimple, Michael E. Satrazemis, Andrew Chambliss, and Ian B. Goldberg, with Chambliss and Goldberg as showrunners for their fifth and final season.

The season takes place seven years after the previous season and has the characters living on the island known as "PADRE".

== Cast ==
The eighth season features ten actors receiving main cast billing status, with all but one of them returning from the seventh season. This was the first season not to include Mo Collins, Colby Hollman and Keith Carradine, who were all credited as main cast members in previous seasons. Alycia Debnam-Carey, who appeared as a series regular for the first seven seasons, returns in a guest role. Alexa Nisenson also returns in a guest role after being a regular since the fifth season. Kim Dickens and Daniel Sharman rejoin as series regulars after the former guest starred in the previous season and having last been a regular in the fourth season; while the latter last appeared as a regular in the third season.

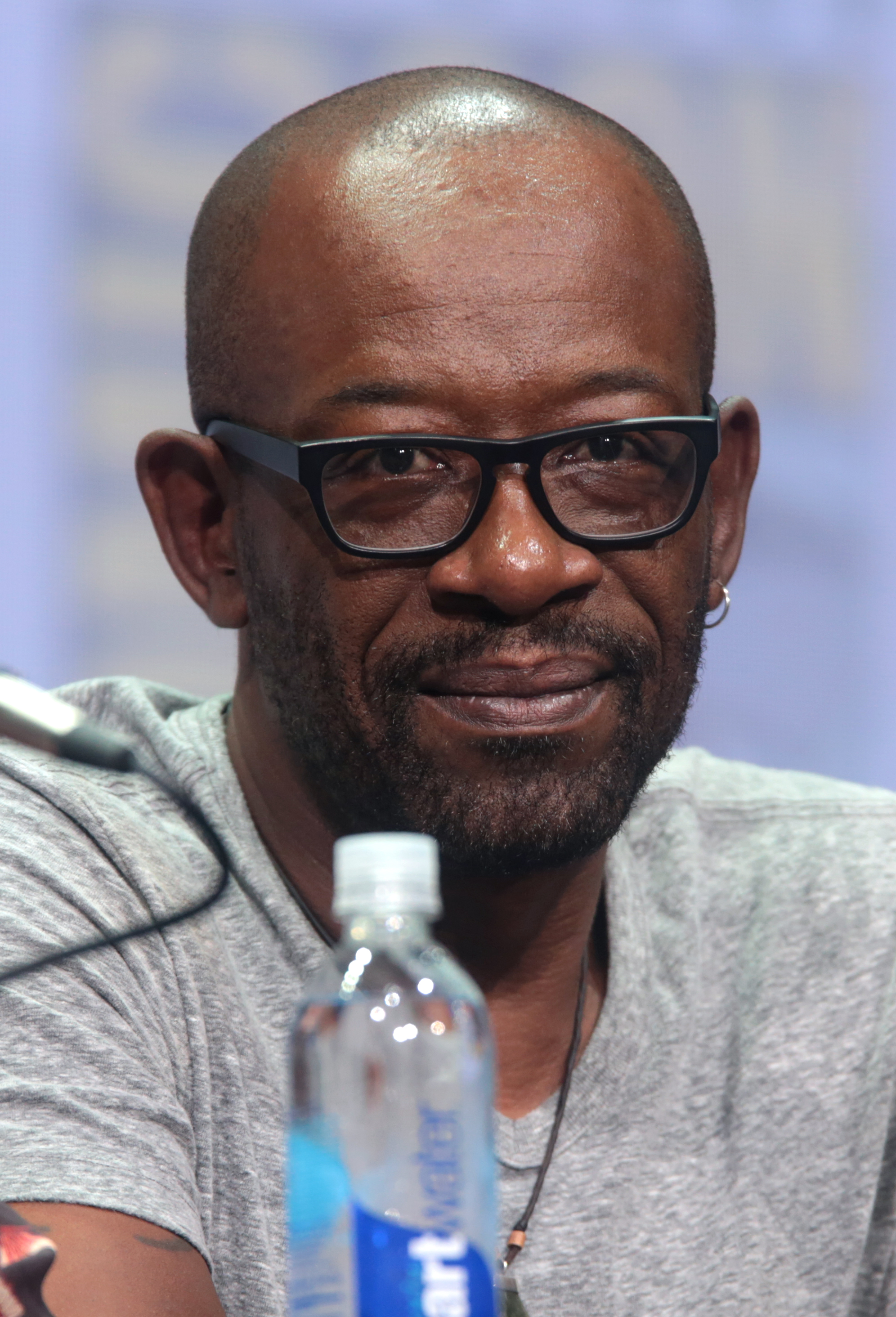
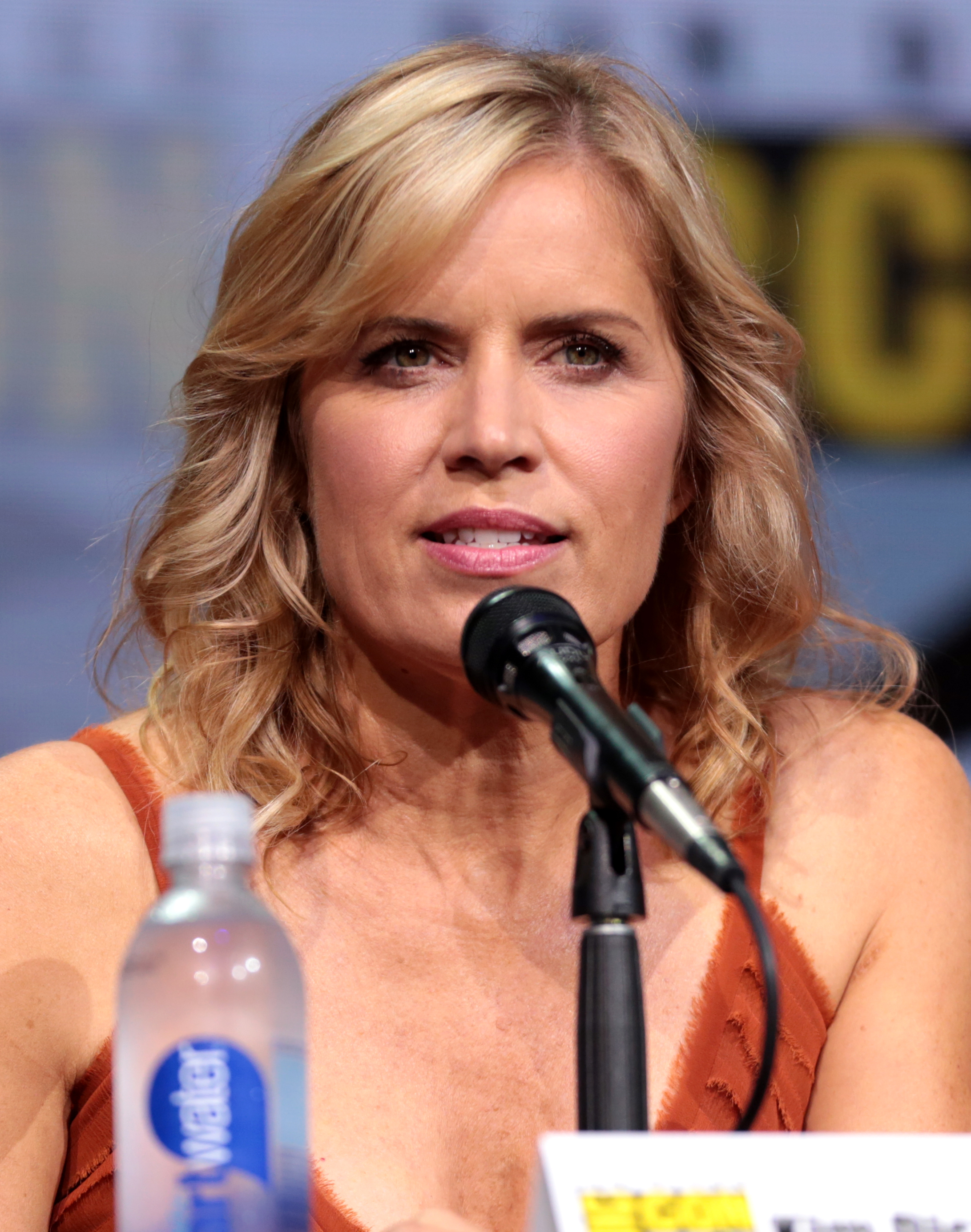
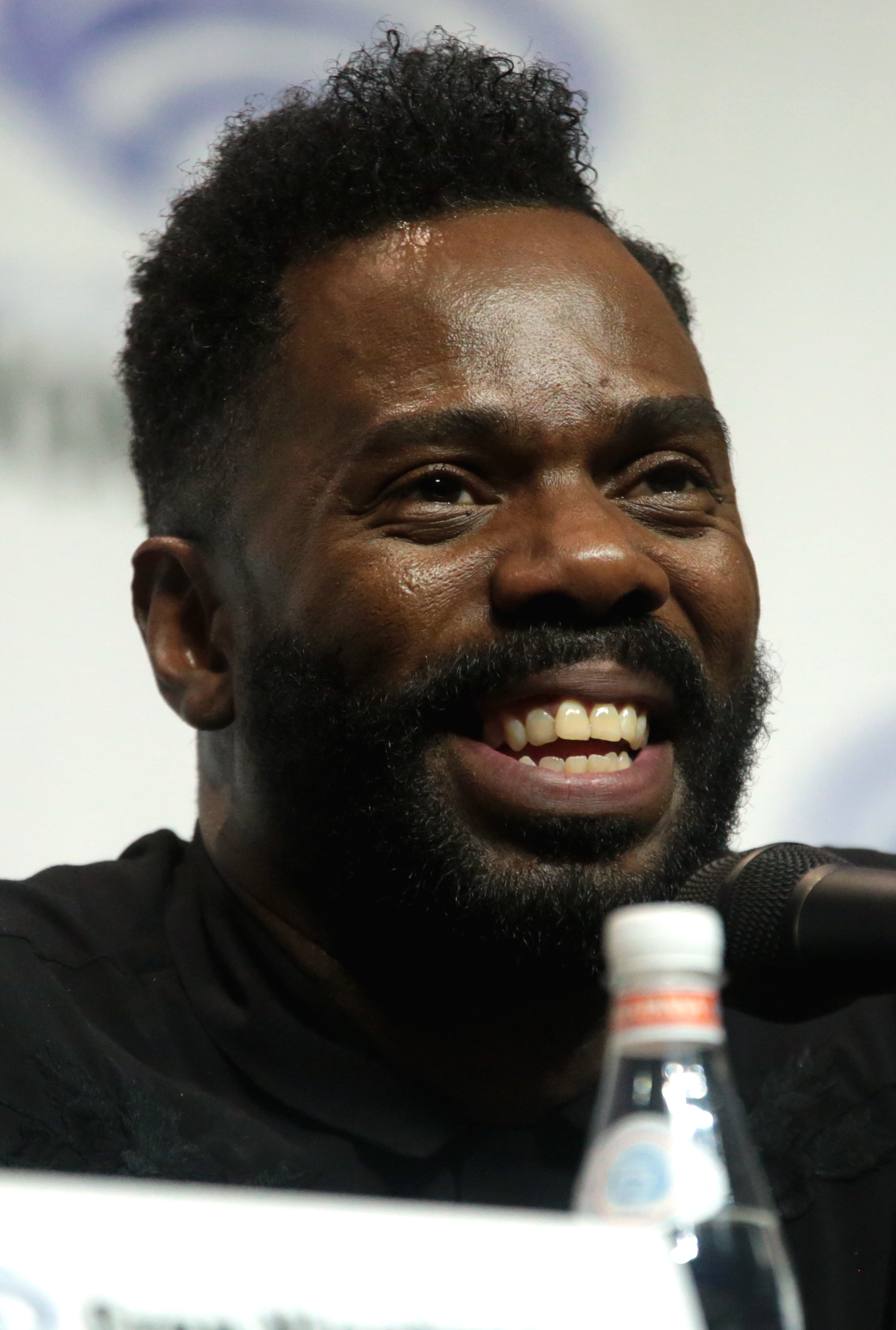
Lennie James (Morgan Jones), Kim Dickens (Madison Clark), and Colman Domingo (Victor Strand)
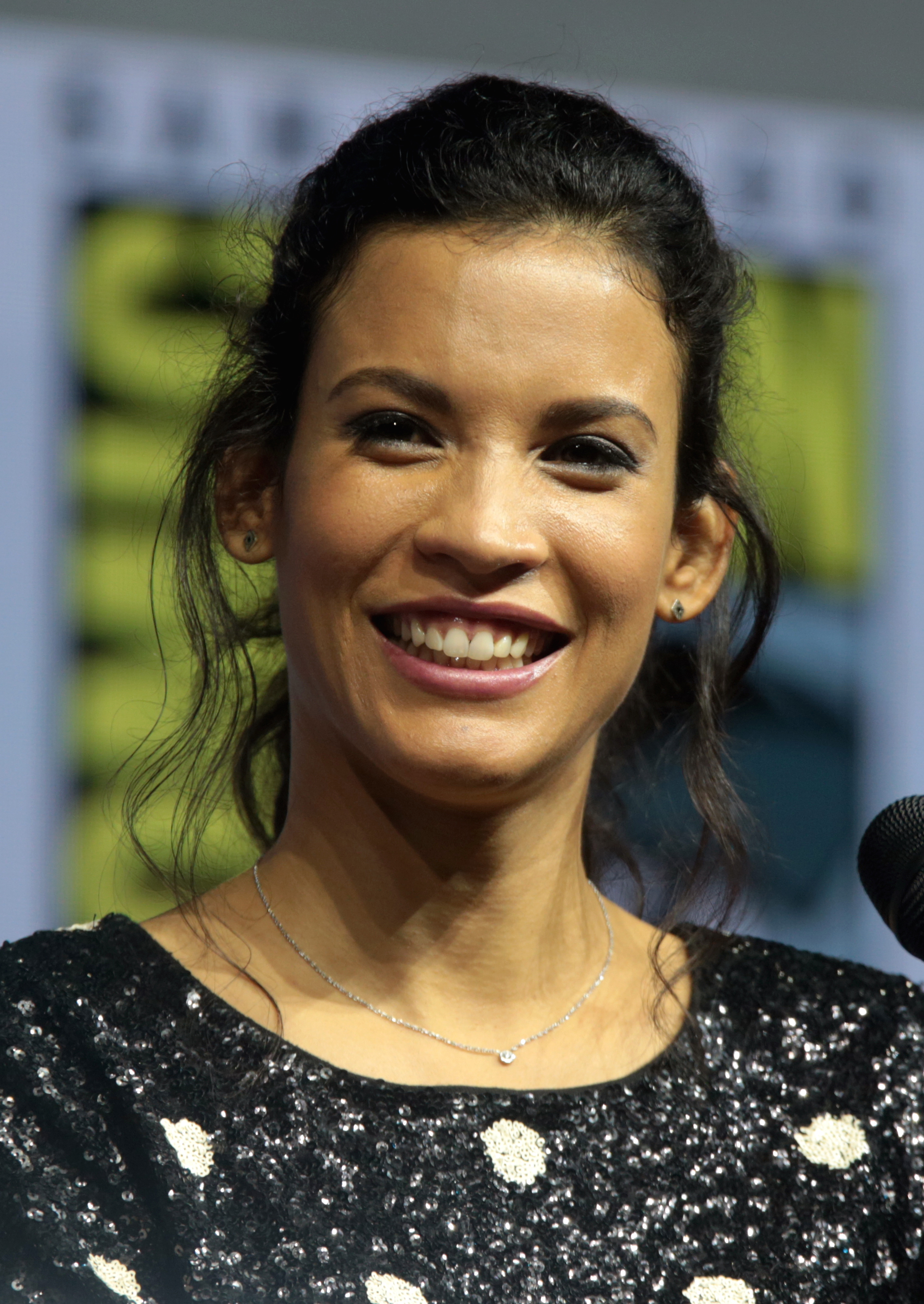
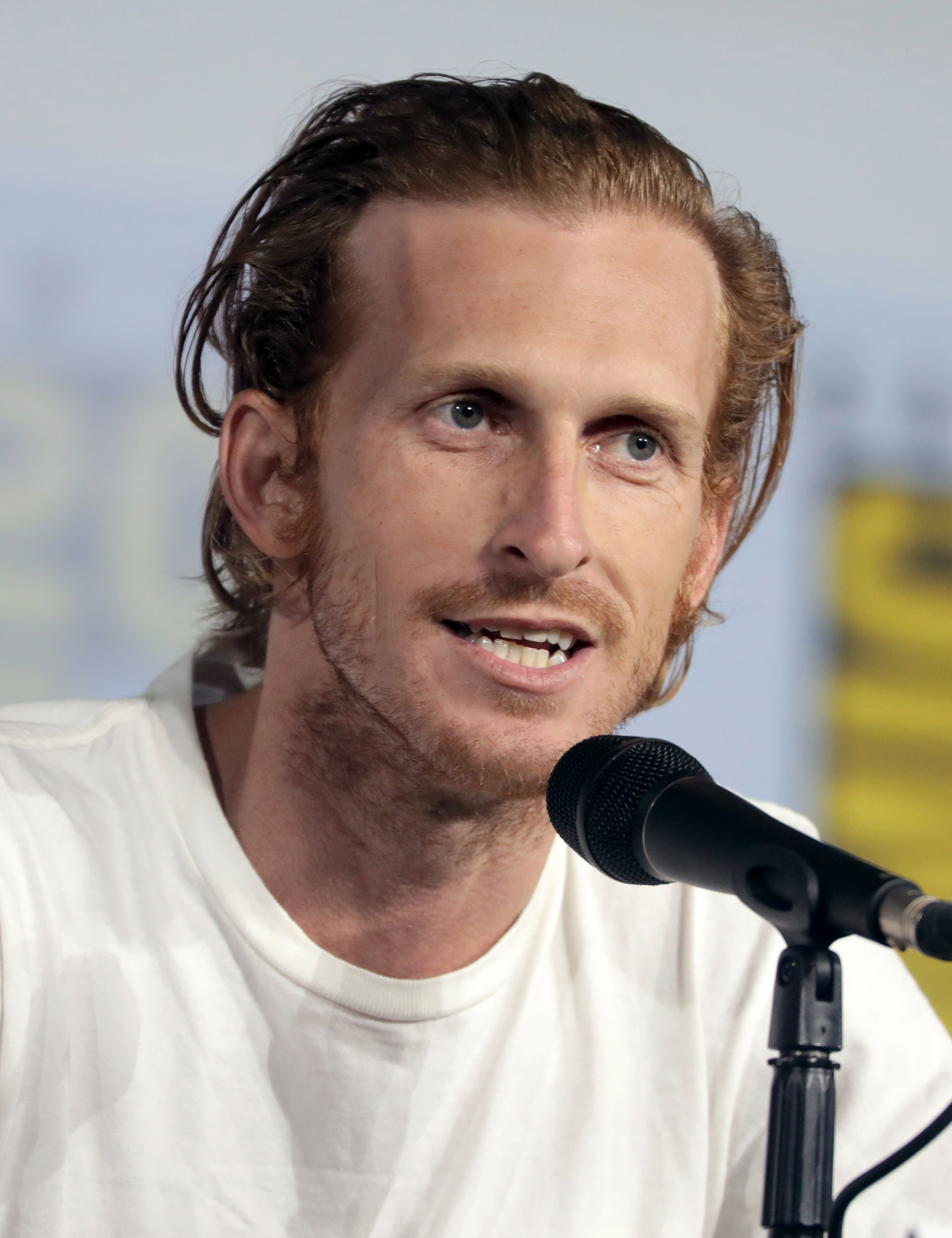
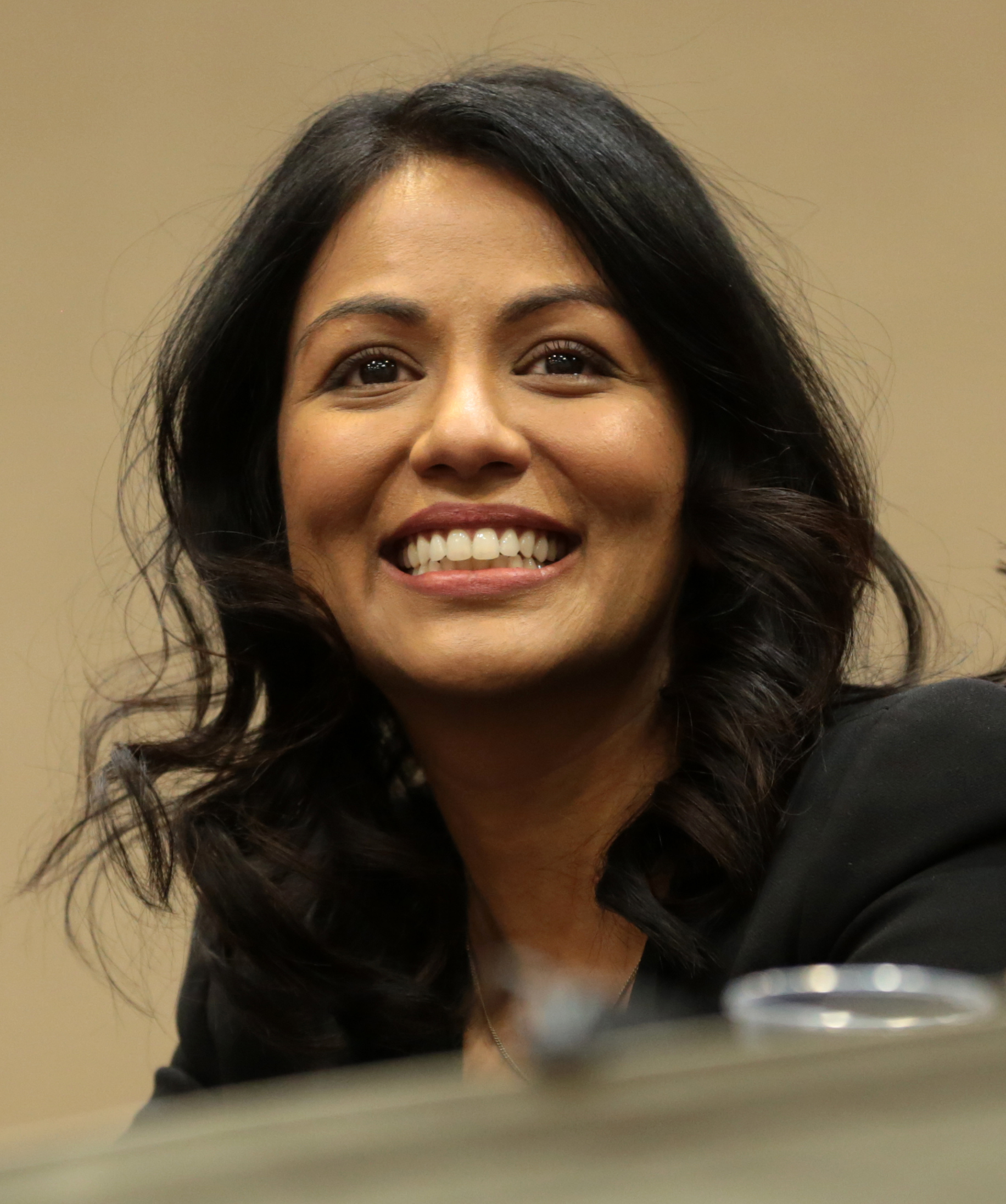
Danay García (Luciana Galvez), Austin Amelio (Dwight), and Karen David (Grace Mukherjee)
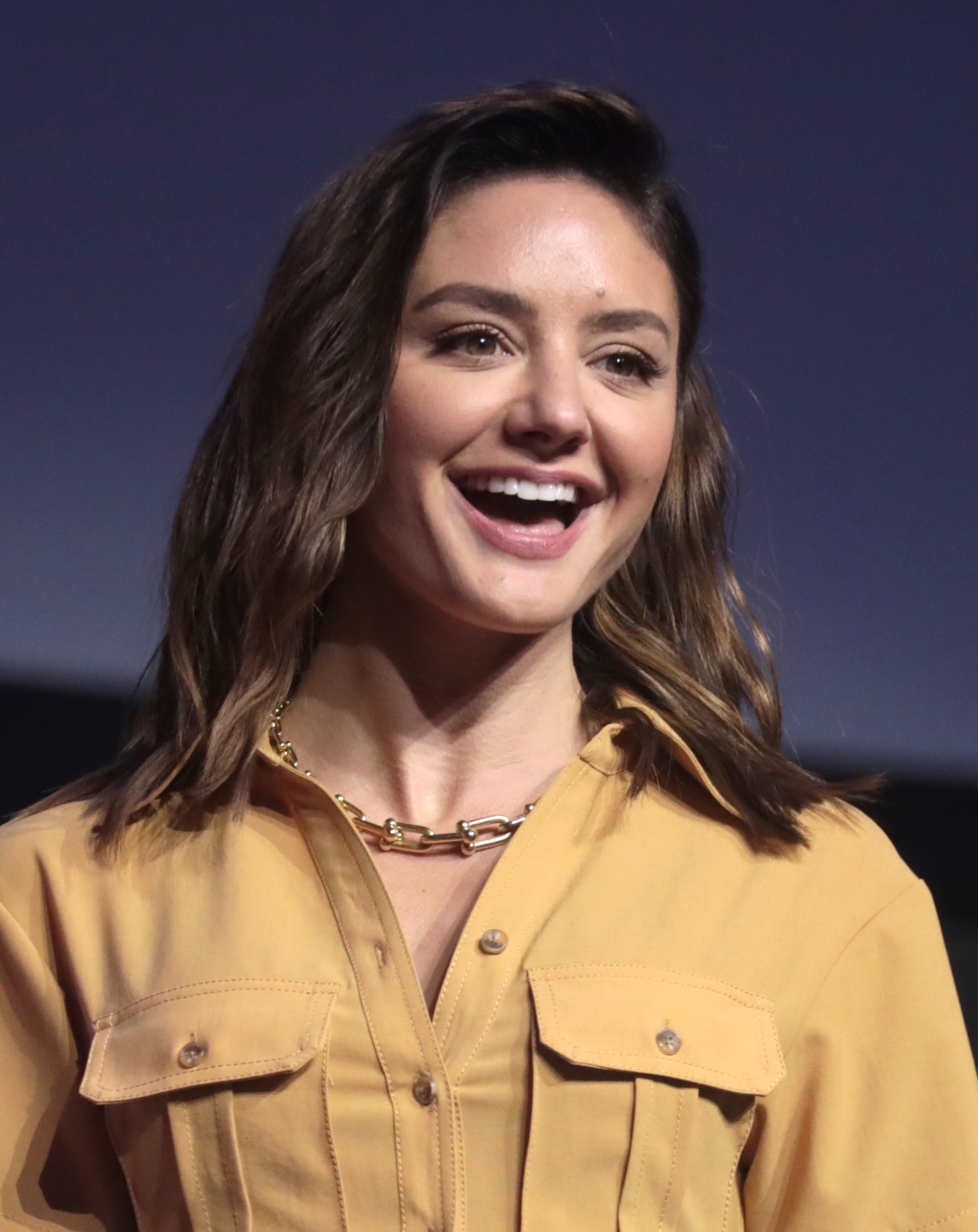
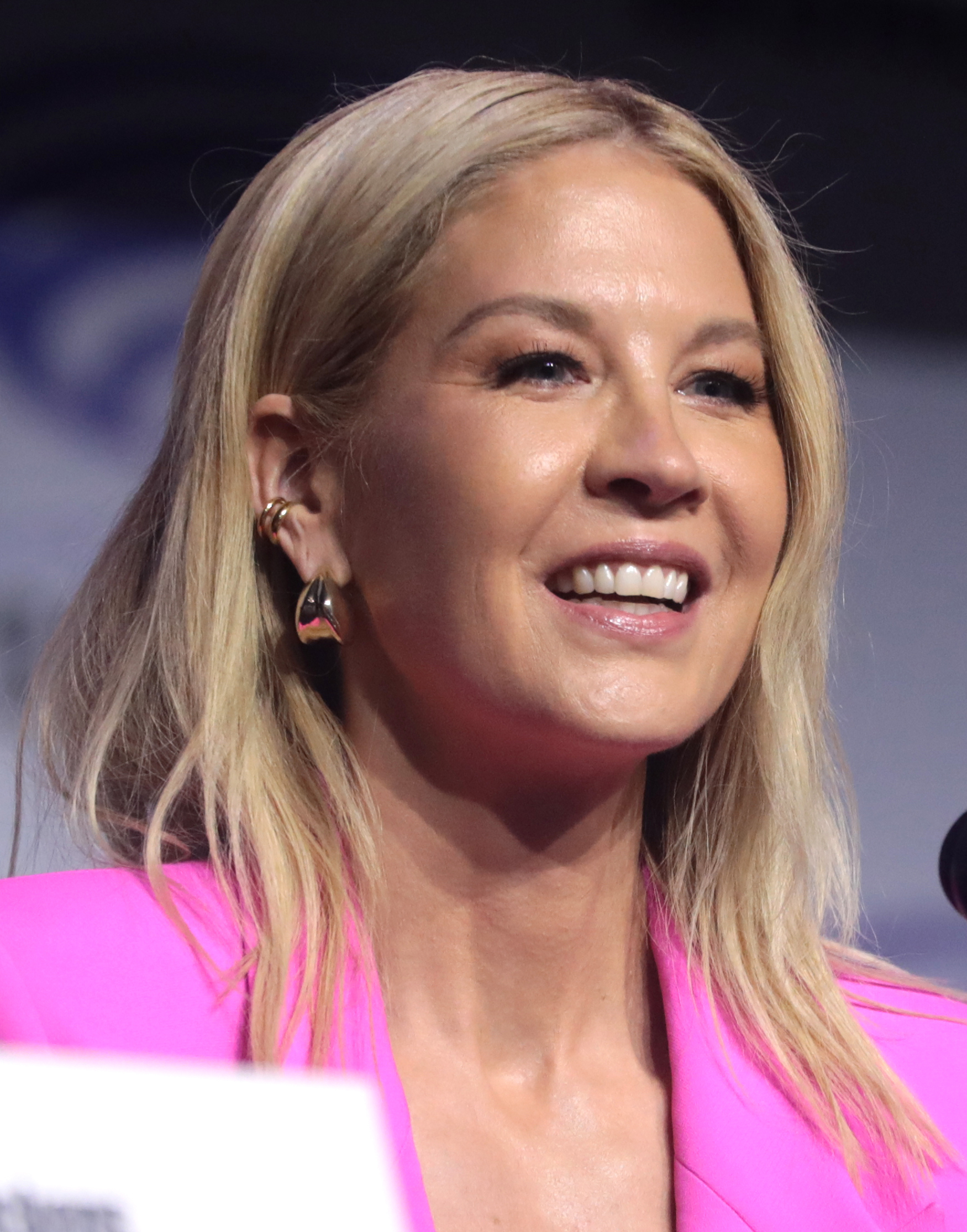
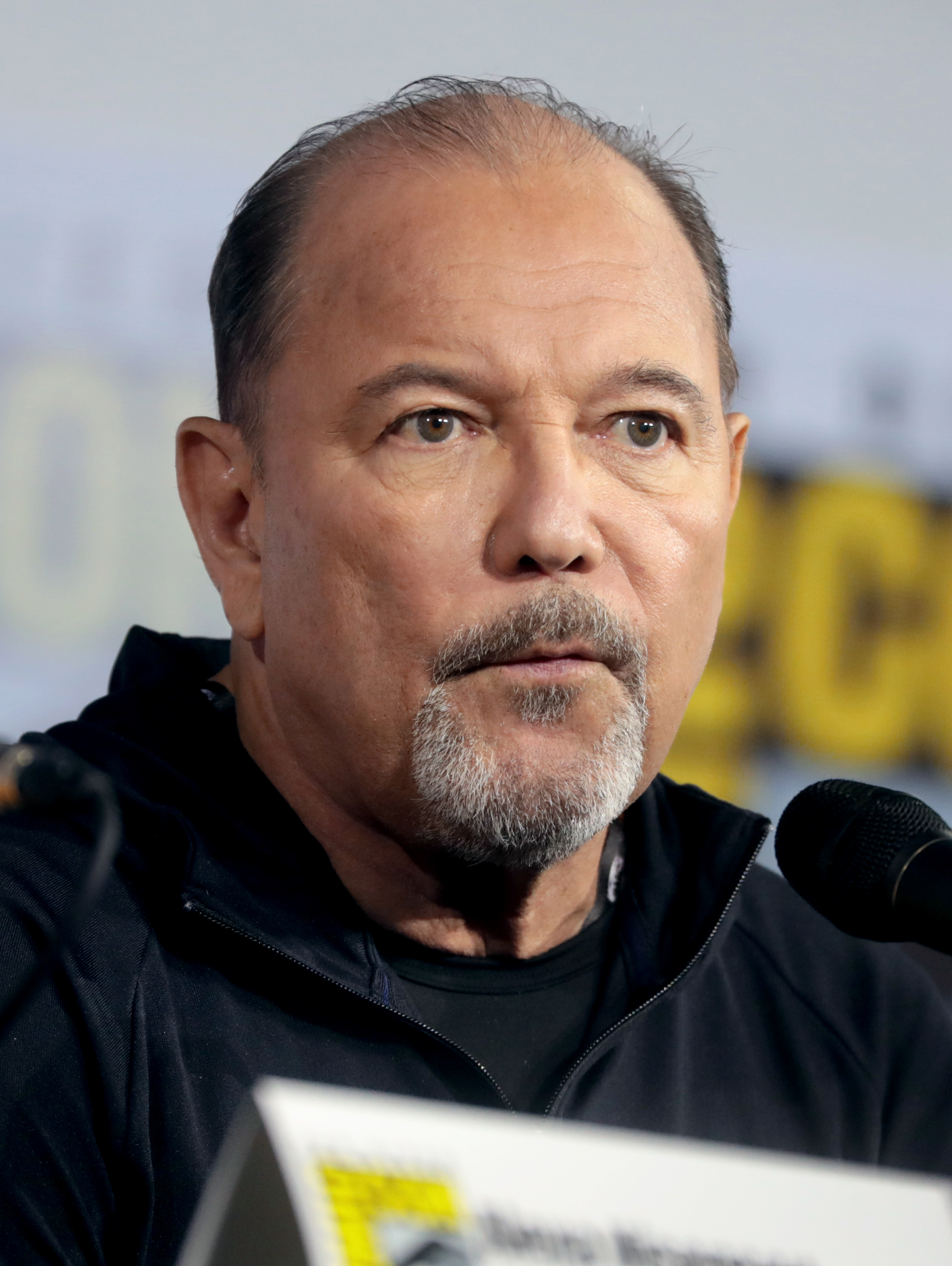
Christine Evangelista (Sherry), Jenna Elfman (June Dorie), and Rubén Blades (Daniel Salazar)

=== Main cast ===
- Lennie James as Morgan Jones / "Nightingale": A pragmatic man, formerly a part of Rick Grimes' group on The Walking Dead, whose adopted daughter was captured by PADRE, which forced him to work for the organization.
- Kim Dickens as Madison Clark / "Lark": A cunning and domineering former high school guidance counselor, and mother of Nick and Alicia. She was recruited by PADRE following her presumed death and now is imprisoned at PADRE's island after rebelling.
- Colman Domingo as Victor Strand / "Anton": A smart and sophisticated conman-turned-businessman who formed friendships with Madison and Alicia. He is the reformed former leader of the Tower who disappeared when Morgan's group was captured by PADRE, having since joined a community of German survivors.
- Danay García as Luciana Galvez / "Polar Bear": A former member of the La Colonia community from Mexico who has since become the leader of a vast supply operation spread across several states that aims to help desperate survivors, taking up the cause and callsign of Clayton and his group of truckers.
- Austin Amelio as Dwight / "Red Kite": A reformed former lieutenant of the Saviors, who was exiled from Virginia by Rick Grimes' group on The Walking Dead and eventually reunited with his wife, Sherry. He is now working for PADRE where their son, Finch, was born.
- Karen David as Grace Mukherjee / "Heron": A woman who used to work at a nuclear power plant that melted down and was in a relationship with Morgan Jones, with whom she has an adopted daughter, Mo. She is now working for PADRE, maintaining its radio communication.
- Christine Evangelista as Sherry / "Starling": Dwight's wife who fled across the country to Texas after escaping the Saviors on The Walking Dead. She is now working for PADRE where their son, Finch, was born.
- Jenna Elfman as June Dorie / "Blue Jay": A kind and distrustful nurse who was married to John Dorie. She is now living alone, hiding from PADRE.
- Rubén Blades as Daniel Salazar: A courageous and ruthlessly pragmatic former Sombra Negra member who is leading a resistance movement against PADRE.
- Daniel Sharman as Troy Otto: The charismatic and impulsive son of Jeremiah Otto, who survived his apparent death at the end of the third season and now leads a militia while seeking revenge on Madison and her allies.

=== Supporting cast ===
- Maya Eshet as Sam Krennick / "Shrike": The ruthless co-leader of PADRE alongside her brother, Ben.
- Zoey Merchant as Morgan "Mo" / "Wren": Morgan and Grace's adopted daughter who was kidnapped by PADRE when she was one-year-old and has been trained as a warrior.
- Jayla Walton as Odessa Sanderson / "Dove": A prefect at PADRE who acts as Mo's tutor. She is the daughter of Ava Sanderson, who Madison encountered in the previous season.
- Gavin Warren as "Finch": Dwight and Sherry's son.
- Daniel Rashid as Ben Krennick / "Crane": The cunning co-leader of PADRE alongside his sister, Sam.
- Isha Blaaker as Frank: Strand's German husband and Klaus' father.
- Julian Grey as Klaus: Frank's son and Strand's adopted son.
- Randy Bernales as Russell: Troy's second-in-command.
- Antonella Rose as Tracy Otto: Troy's rebellious daughter.

=== Guest cast ===
- Jonathan Medina as Adrian: A member of Daniel's resistance movement whose daughter was kidnapped by PADRE.
- Michael B. Silver as Major General Krennick: Sam and Ben's father who is a high-ranking officer in the U.S. military during the early days of the apocalypse.
- Alexa Nisenson as Charlie / "Iron Tiger": A former spy for the Vultures, now an adult, who was cured of radiation sickness by PADRE before joining Luciana's supply operation under the call sign "Iron Tiger".
- Jack Mikesell as Jay: A diabetic survivor who encounters Dwight.
- Alex Morf as Marty: A hostile survivor whose group occupies the Sanctuary.
- Nona Parker Johnson as Ada: The leader of a group of survivors who continue Alicia's legacy by masquerading as her.
- Alycia Debnam-Carey as Alicia Clark: The fiery yet compassionate daughter of Madison. After she leaves the group in Texas to help desperate survivors in the previous season, her fate has since become unknown after the re-emergence of Troy and his group, prompting Madison to search for her.

== Episodes ==
No. overall	No. in season	Title	Directed by	Written by	Original release date	U.S. viewers (millions)
102	1	"Remember What They Took from You"	Michael E. Satrazemis	Ian Goldberg & Andrew Chambliss	May 14, 2023	0.56
Taken to PADRE, an island off the coast of Georgia, Morgan and Madison overpower several guards and rescue Mo. Seven years later, a suicidal Madison is imprisoned for her role in Mo's escape. Learning about Madison, a young girl named Wren attempts to enlist her help for training to take part in PADRE's future, but Madison discovers she is actually Mo, and has been brainwashed by PADRE. They escape the island and encounter Morgan, now working for PADRE, who believes that Mo is safer on the island. Morgan leads them to a houseboat in a walker-infested swamp, where Mo finds references to Morgan's past life. Under attack by walkers, Morgan admits a similar attack seven years ago caused him to give Mo up to PADRE for her safety. Grace arrives and rescues the group, but Morgan and Grace reluctantly decide to turn Mo back over to PADRE. Now disillusioned with PADRE, Mo begs her parents to flee with her, but they refuse. Madison is taken back into custody, while Morgan is fired out of fear that he will eventually choose Mo over PADRE. Back on the island, Mo claims to have learned her lesson and resumes her training with newfound confidence.
103	2	"Blue Jay"	Heather Cappielo	Andrew Chambliss & Ian Goldberg	May 21, 2023	0.47
June, living alone in the wilderness, attacks PADRE Collectors and cuts off their trigger fingers. She meets a desperate father, Adrian, who is searching for his daughter, Hannah. During an ambush, June discovers Dwight, Sherry and their son Finch, who has appendicitis and needs surgery. June reluctantly agrees to help and takes them to an abandoned lab. Joined by Adrian, June admits she performed experiments with radiation to find a cure to bite infections after having deduced that Alicia had survived due to her previous exposure. (Note: Occurred in season 5's "Still Standing".) However, the radiation levels were fatal to her test subjects, causing June to abandon her research. After finding Hannah amongst the test subjects, a devastated Adrian allows himself to be devoured rather than live without her. June saves Finch and decides to flee PADRE with Dwight and Sherry. They are caught by Shrike, who cuts off June's trigger finger and has Finch bitten by an undead Adrian in order to motivate June to resume working on a cure. Elsewhere, Morgan admits his guilt over something he didn't do in his past is holding him back in his relationship with Mo. Madison helps Morgan escape, remaining behind and ordering him to go fix whatever it is.
104	3	"Odessa"	Ron Underwood	Andrew Chambliss & Ian Goldberg	May 28, 2023	0.47
Twelve years earlier, General Krennick of the U.S. Army prepares to distribute supplies PADRE stockpiled to rebuild civilization. Walkers overrun the shipyard and Krennick is killed. He implores his children Sam and Ben to continue PADRE's mission. In the present, with June's treatment having been successful on Finch, Shrike prepares to experiment on Madison. Suspicious of Finch's fate, Mo and Dove find the train and create a distraction, allowing June to overpower Shrike. The group Adrian was part of, led by Daniel, eventually captures them. Daniel, having been abandoned by PADRE, reveals he organized a group of parents into a resistance movement to rescue their kids. With Shrike as a hostage, Madison, June and Dove return to the island and confront PADRE, who is revealed to be Ben. After losing their father, Shrike and Ben restructured PADRE to protect children from the pain of losing their parents while simultaneously working to rebuild the world. Dove turns on Madison after learning she is actually Odessa Sanderson and her mother died in Louisiana because Madison convinced her that she could rescue her daughter. Daniel rescues Madison and June, and vows to find Morgan. Shrike returns to the shipyard and tells Ben they will clear out the walkers and begin their expansion, as their father intended.
105	4	"King County"	Kenneth Requa	Ian Goldberg & Andrew Chambliss	June 4, 2023	0.46
Morgan returns to King County, Georgia on a quest to put down his zombified son, Duane. Grace and Mo follow him, as well as Dwight and Sherry, who were forced into hunting Morgan by Shrike. Morgan reveals his wife, Jenny, bit Duane after he couldn't bring himself to put her down when he had the chance. Morgan and Grace are eventually captured and forced to show Shrike's forces that they are telling the truth about Morgan's mission, but they find no sign of Duane. Dwight and Sherry kill the guards with them, unwilling to allow Morgan to be executed, and help Finch escape from Shrike's captivity. Left alone, Grace confesses to Morgan that she is terminally ill from radiation sickness. While trying to escape from Morgan's burning house, Mo discovers her father chained up Duane in the attic years before during his period of insanity. With Mo in danger, Morgan is finally able to shoot Duane with the gun that Rick Grimes had left for him and buries Jenny and Duane's bodies. Shortly thereafter, a walker bites Grace, and Morgan vows to get her to June for help.
106	5	"More Time Than You Know"	Heather Cappielo	David Johnson & Calaya Michelle Stallworth	June 11, 2023	0.55
Morgan enters a race against time to get Grace to the train car and June for treatment. Resigned to her fate, Grace tries to get her family to accept the inevitable and enjoy the time she has left. Shrike offers Morgan a deal where she'll help him in exchange for Morgan clearing out the shipyard, but Morgan, Daniel and the others decline when they learn it has to be done by hand. Meanwhile, Finch becomes sick as his own infection returns, the treatment only having a temporary effect due to June not using enough radiation out of the fear it would kill him. Morgan finally accepts Grace's fate, but Mo goes against her parents' wishes and takes Grace to the train car. Although June guides Mo through the treatment, it fails to work and Grace dies. Mo is unable to put down Grace, who reanimates. Morgan arrives in time to save Mo from a zombified Grace, and Mo decides to re-join PADRE as a way of escaping from her pain. Shrike locks Morgan in the train car surrounded by a herd as she, Mo and the others prepare to attack the walkers at the shipyard.
107	6	"All I See Is Red"	Michael E. Satrazemis	Andrew Chambliss & Ian Goldberg	June 18, 2023	0.46
Descending back into periodic insanity after losing Grace, Morgan escapes from the train car and teams up with Madison and Daniel's group to stop PADRE'S expansion. Having been outmatched by the walkers at the shipyard, Mo and the Prefects lead them into the swamps towards Morgan's houseboat, but Shrike knows her father carries the coordinates PADRE needs. After attacking his allies, Morgan ends up trapped with Mo at the houseboat. He helps Mo escape before being rescued by Madison. As Shrike prepares to kill them, Krennick crawls out of the swamp and bites her; Madison puts Krennick down and takes the coordinates. Ben and the Prefects surrender following an impassioned plea by Madison, Morgan and Daniel. At the request of a dying Finch, June allows Ben to euthanize Shrike and banishes him from PADRE. After burying Finch and knowing they only bring pain to each other, Dwight and Sherry decide to end their relationship for good. Finally at peace with his losses, Morgan buries Grace by Eastman's cabin (Note: As shown in The Walking Dead episode "Here's Not Here".) and decides to return to Alexandria with Mo to find Rick Grimes. As Madison rebuilds PADRE into its original purpose, an unknown survivor, in possession of Strand's sunglasses and Alicia's prosthetic arm, is shown to be listening to her broadcast.
108	7	"Anton"	Danay García	Nazrin Choudhury & Justin Boyd	October 22, 2023	0.54
On the run from a hostile group, Madison takes shelter in a friendly hotel community run by Victor Strand who is now going by the name Anton, has adopted a son named Klaus, with his husband Frank, and hides his past. When the other group comes searching for Madison, frightened of his past coming back to haunt him, Strand tries to turn her over to them, but Klaus helps Madison to escape and convinces his father to help. Hiding from a herd, Strand explains that after leaving Texas, he and several others washed up in Georgia, but they rejected his help due to Strand's tyrannical past, leading to their deaths of starvation. Remorseful for his actions and wanting to live up to Alicia's request to become a better man, Strand reinvented himself as Anton, the man that he wants to be. Madison, Strand and his people are captured by the hostile group who are revealed to be led, much to Madison and Strand's shock, by Troy Otto who had supposedly died several years ago at Madison's hands. Having survived blinded in one eye, Troy seeks revenge on Madison and to take PADRE for his people, exposing Madison and Strand's secrets to Strand's people. Before Troy can harm anyone, the group is rescued by Daniel, June, Sherry and several others and Madison takes Strand's people back to PADRE. Before they leave, Troy claims to have killed Alicia Clark and left her to reanimate, providing Madison with Alicia's prosthetic arm as proof of his claims.
109	8	"Iron Tiger"	S. J. Main Muñoz	Nick Bernardone & Jacob Pinion	October 29, 2023	0.52
In search of gas, Daniel, Strand and Madison are reunited with Luciana and Charlie who was cured of her illness by PADRE. After being captured by PADRE, Luciana had agreed to refine oil for them in exchange for the use of PADRE's resources to help other survivors across the country and for the release of Daniel whom PADRE had intended to kill. Charlie confesses to an enraged Madison that she was the one to murder Nick, causing Madison to blame her choices for the deaths of her children. Madison demands that Charlie use her skills to assassinate Troy, but relents and forgives the girl after discovering that Charlie had Nick's body dug up and cremated, leaving Nick's ashes for his mother. However, Charlie is captured by Troy who demands the location of PADRE in exchange for Charlie's release. In the chaos of an explosion that she set, Charlie breaks free and commits suicide, sacrificing herself to protect PADRE. Madison briefly helps Troy to search for his missing daughter Tracy, learning that he was cutting off the arms of walkers to mess with her and that Troy blames Madison for the death of Tracy's mother, something that Madison has no knowledge of. The death of Charlie causes Luciana and Daniel to turn against Madison, and Daniel leaves to be with Luciana. Realizing that they're right, Madison leaves PADRE in Strand's care and goes off on her own.
110	9	"Sanctuary"	Phil McLaughlin	Justin Boyd & David Johnson	November 5, 2023	0.50
Devastated by the loss of his son, Dwight returns to his and Sherry's old home where he encounters Jay, another survivor whose much needed insulin has been stolen by a group of bandits living in the long-abandoned Sanctuary, Negan's old fortress. Dwight retrieves the insulin, burning one of the bandits to death in the furnace, but Jay has already succumbed to his diabetes. Experiencing an emotional breakdown, Dwight is approached for help in the fight against Troy by Sherry, June and Dove, but Dwight refuses, believing that he will only cause more harm to people that he cares about. Dove is shot by the bandits, forcing the group to take her to the Sanctuary for treatment where Dove reveals that she was trying to run away because she believes that under the current leadership, they will just get everyone killed. At the Sanctuary, Dwight and Sherry are forced to face their trauma from living under Negan while June is forced to face her guilt over being unable to save her daughter and Finch. A herd and the bandits attack, causing the already unstable building to collapse, killing everyone but Dwight, Sherry, June and Dove who hide in the furnace. Filled with a renewed determination to make something good out of all the bad that they've encountered, June successfully removes the bullet and Dwight agrees to return to PADRE, inviting June and Dove, who returns to going by her birth name Odessa, to join his and Sherry's family. Strand captures Troy's daughter Tracy and tells Tracy that she will help him to save PADRE.
111	10	"Keeping Her Alive"	James Armstrong	Nazrin Choudhury & Calaya Michelle Stallworth	November 12, 2023	0.47
Furious about Strand's abduction of Tracy, Dwight, Sherry and June attempt to return the girl to her father along with Strand. Wanting to save Tracy from that, Strand escapes with her and brings Tracy to Madison who is continuing her search for Alicia and Tracy agrees to help Madison find Alicia. Wanting to use Tracy to get revenge for Ofelia's death, Daniel accompanies them, throwing Strand out of the truck when he tries to stop them. Strand is rescued by a group of women driving Al's old SWAT van who explain that, after escaping Texas with dozens of survivors who had heard her message, (Note: As shown in "Divine Providence" and "Amina".) Alicia had traveled around helping survivor groups until her apparent death; having been saved by Alicia, the group has been keeping her alive for other people. Tracy leads Daniel and Madison into a trapped herd that she claims holds Alicia, but in reality, it's an attempt to get Madison killed by her zombified mother who Tracy claims died because she believed in the same things as Madison and Alicia. Tracy finally tells Madison that Alicia is in a mansion near Fort Worth and Strand talks Madison down from killing Tracy, but she escapes with the knowledge of where PADRE is, convinced that Troy was right about them. Troy attacks Luciana's truck stop, killing most of both groups, but they realize that Troy intends to attack PADRE using an army of the dead like he did with Broke Jaw Ranch. (Note: As seen in "Brother's Keeper" and "This Land Is Your Land".) Unwilling to risk anyone else that she cares about, Madison goes after Troy alone in the SWAT van.
112	11	"Fighting Like You"	Haifaa al-Mansour	Nick Bernardone & Jacob Pinion & Kelly Jane Costello	November 19, 2023	0.44
Troy begins leading a massive herd to PADRE, but his truck is wrecked by a trap, causing Tracy to seek out Madison's help. After a brief scuffle, the two reach a deal where Madison will help Troy bury his wife Serena and reunite with Tracy and he will lead them to the herd. Troy reveals that Alicia had saved Serena from a walker bite, causing Serena to follow in Alicia's footsteps. Serena was killed in a robbery while answering a distress call, causing the grief-stricken Troy to blame Alicia and Madison. However, the two are attacked by a vengeful Ben Krennick who seeks to reclaim PADRE for himself. Ben reveals that he and Shrike had rescued Madison from the destruction of the Dell Diamond baseball stadium (Note: As seen in "No One's Gone".) and used her love for her children to manipulate Madison to do their bidding. Madison draws in walkers who devour Ben while Troy unexpectedly saves her life. A remorseful Troy admits that Serena had encouraged him to continue helping others even after it killed her, and Troy willingly helps Madison's group to stop the herd. Believing that Alicia giving Troy a second chance got her daughter killed, Madison fatally impales Troy with Alicia's prosthetic arm rather than making peace with him. Before dying, Troy implores Madison to take care of Tracy, claiming that she is actually Alicia's daughter who Troy had kidnapped.
113	12	"The Road Ahead"	Michael E. Satrazemis	Ian Goldberg & Andrew Chambliss	November 19, 2023	0.44
Now convinced that trying to help others only gets people killed, Madison attempts to set out with Tracy to find Alicia, putting Madison at odds with her friends. Russell reveals that Alicia might still be alive before launching an attack on PADRE with thousands of walkers in retaliation for Troy's death. Tracy shoots Madison and puts down and buries a zombified Troy before later being found by Strand. Strand reveals that although PADRE was destroyed, everyone escaped because Madison, having been protected from the bullet by Alicia's St. Christopher's medallion, had once again seemingly sacrificed herself to destroy the herd the exact same way that she did at the stadium. Renaming the organization MADRE in honor of Madison's sacrifice, the group splits up to use MADRE's supplies to build new communities and honor Madison's ideals of trying to build something better. June decides to return to John Dorie's cabin with Odessa and to provide medical attention to those in need while Dwight and Sherry set out to find the still missing parents of PADRE's children, intending to rebuild the Sanctuary with them. Daniel and Strand finally make peace before parting ways and Daniel is reunited with his long-lost cat Skidmark. (Note: Lost at some point between "Handle with Care" and "USS Pennsylvania" as mentioned in "Ofelia".) Madison is rescued by Tracy and reunites with a still alive Alicia who reveals that she is not Tracy's mother. Madison and Alicia let Strand know that they had survived, but choose to keep their survival a secret otherwise. Madison decides to return to Los Angeles with Alicia and Tracy to help rebuild their old home.

== Production ==
The series was renewed for an eighth season in December 2021. Upon the renewal announcement, it was confirmed that Kim Dickens, who played the lead character during the first four seasons, would rejoin the series as a regular for the eighth season after first returning as a guest star for the seventh season. In January 2023, it was confirmed the eighth season would be its last and would consist of 12 episodes split into two six-episode parts.

Production for the eighth season moved from Texas to Savannah, Georgia, including scenes at the De Renne Georgia Library at Wormsloe Historic Site. In April 2022, co-showrunner Andrew Chambliss said they were in the planning stages of the season. The final season began filming in August 2022 and concluded in March 2023. For the final season, Colman Domingo is credited as a producer. The sixth episode of the season marks the final appearance of Morgan Jones portrayed by Lennie James, whose character originally debuted in the pilot episode of The Walking Dead which aired in 2010. In July 2023, it was confirmed that Daniel Sharman would reprise his role as Troy Otto in the second half of the season. His character was presumably killed off at the end of the third season. Danay García directed an episode of the series, making her the fourth cast member to direct an episode.

== Release ==
The season premiered on May 14, 2023, on AMC, with each episode available three days early via AMC+. The second half of the season premiered on October 22, 2023, and the series finale aired on November 19.

== Reception ==
=== Critical response ===
On Rotten Tomatoes, the season has a rating of 60% based on 5 reviews, with an average rating of 7/10.
