= Evolution (The Walking Dead) =

- The Walking Dead episode
- Episode no.: Season 9 Episode 8
- Directed by: Michael E. Satrazemis
- Written by: David Leslie Johnson-McGoldrick
- Cinematography by: Stephen Campbell
- Editing by: Evan Schrodek
- Original air date: November 25, 2018
- Running time: 44 minutes

Guest appearances
- Eleanor Matsuura as Yumiko; Dan Fogler as Luke; Nadia Hilker as Magna; John Finn as Earl Sutton; Lauren Ridloff as Connie; Matt Lintz as Henry; Kerry Cahill as Dianne; Matt Magnum as DJ; Angel Theory as Kelly; James Chen as Kal

Episode chronology
← Previous "Stradivarius"	Next → "Adaptation"
- The Walking Dead season 9

"Evolution" is the eighth episode and mid-season finale of the ninth season of the post-apocalyptic horror television series The Walking Dead, which aired on AMC on November 25, 2018.

== Plot ==
Daryl, Jesus, and Aaron follow a missing Eugene's tracks. They observe a herd of walkers milling around in the middle of a field and talk about how unusual it is of the walkers to be doing this, and decide to walk around it. As they depart, an odd looking walker watches them from the herd.

At Alexandria, Gabriel sits with Negan, trying to comfort him, but Negan continues to antagonize his efforts. After their conversation, the riders from the Hilltop arrive with news that Rosita was injured and has been taken to the Hilltop. When Gabriel next sees Negan, he chastises him, telling him that he is forced to stay to watch over Negan instead of seeing to Rosita, earning Negan's genuine sympathy; Gabriel brushes it off.

Michonne, Siddiq, and DJ lead Magna's group to the Hilltop, though they are met with clear hostility. Tara explains that Eugene's still missing and that Aaron is out with Jesus searching for him. Michonne and Siddiq help to introduce Magna's group to the Hilltop residents, as well as Carol. Michonne and Carol have a private conversation, revealing that there is factiousness between Alexandria, the Hilltop, and the Kingdom, making it difficult to continue their past friendship, or for Alexandria to participate in an upcoming fair. Henry gets settled into the Hilltop as apprentice to blacksmith Earl, as Carol returns to the Kingdom, but discovers that Enid, his crush, is in a relationship with Alden. Meanwhile, Rosita wakes and immediately warns Michonne and Tara of the threat she and Eugene discovered, and that Daryl's group is not safe.

Depressed, Henry meets with a group of teenagers, who invite him to join them that evening for some debauchery at a secret shelter outside the gates. After drinking moonshine whiskey heavily, they show him a walker that they have been using as a plaything, but Henry quickly kills it and the rest of the group abandons him. When he returns on his own, Tara and Earl put him in a cell for drunken disobedience. Though Earl considers sending Henry back to the Kingdom, he becomes sympathetic to Henry due to his own drunken mistakes and promises to speak to Jesus on his behalf. Meanwhile, at the jail, Negan discovers that the door to his cell was left unlocked and exits it.

Daryl's group lures the herd away and goes to a barn that was near Rosita's location, where they find Eugene hidden under its floor. Eugene explains to them that Rosita stashed him there due to his knee injury and warns them that the herd outside is unusual, having heard them speaking before and that they have come through twice before looking for him. He suggests the possibility that the walkers may have evolved into more intelligent foes. The group quickly find that the herd is approaching the barn and evacuate. Daryl offers to lead the herd away while the others take Eugene back to the Hilltop. However, despite creating a distraction with fireworks and Dog's barking, the herd continues on following the others. Aaron, Eugene, and Jesus eventually get trapped in a walled cemetery, and as they take out the front line of walkers, Michonne arrives with others from the Hilltop to help rescue them, but Jesus decides to stay back to cover the others. Jesus dispatches several walkers, but one of them ducks his blade and grabs and fatally stabs him, warning him that they are where they "do not belong." Daryl arrives and kills the walker while the group clears the rest. As Aaron mourns over Jesus's body, Daryl examines the walker that killed Jesus, revealing that it was a living human wearing a mask made out of a walker's skin. Before they can process the situation, whispers around them get louder; the group circles up preparing for a fight.

== Production ==
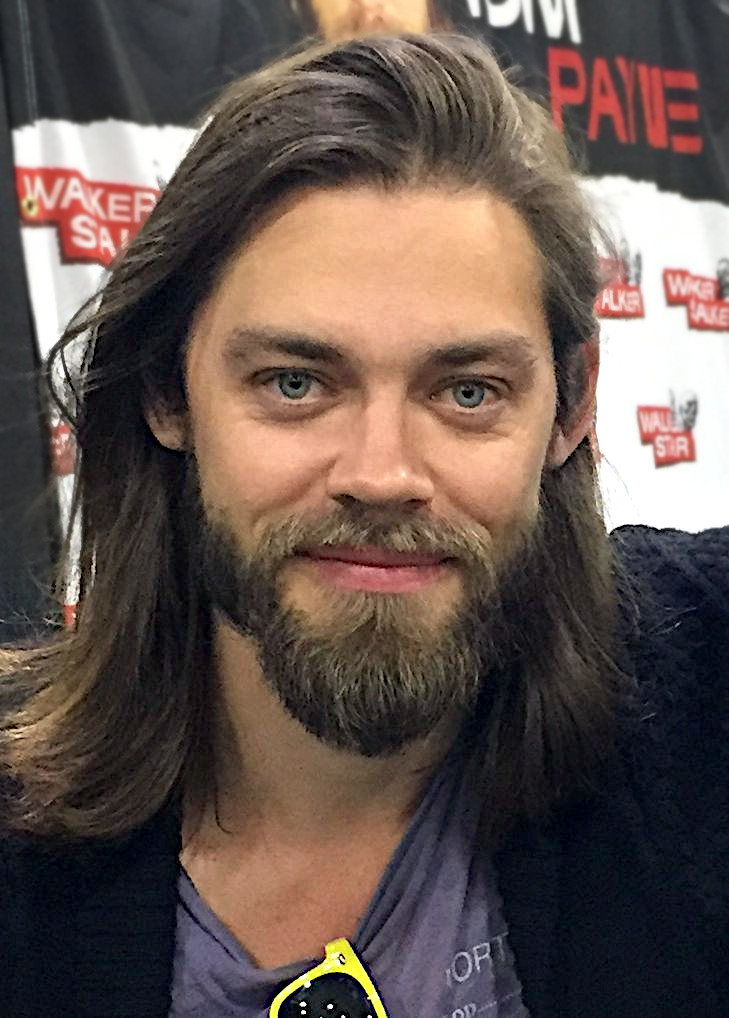
The episode marks the death of Paul "Jesus" Rovia, played by Tom Payne.

"Evolution" marks the death of Paul "Jesus" Rovia (Tom Payne). Jesus was a recurring character in the sixth season but became part of the main cast in Season 7. His death at the hands of the Whisperers is a significant change from the comic arc, in which Jesus helps spearhead the communities' fight against the Whisperers and comes to have a long-term relationship with Aaron. Payne stated that he was not disappointed in leaving the show as he had become frustrated by how little the character has been used despite the fact that he had taken efforts to train for various action roles that had been suggested by the comic storyline during the war with the Saviors and Whisperers. He stated "it was mutual and they knew I would be OK with it. It's an amazing show and I was so honored to be a part of it, but at the same time, being the same character without anything fun to do is a bit frustrating." Payne did ask showrunner Angela Kang to make sure his departure was done "to make sure we were telling a story that surprises the audience" and was happy that his death formally presented the human Whisperers on the show. He did not rule out his reappearance in the second half of season nine, alluding to the show's plans to have flashbacks into the six-year time jump following Rick Grimes' disappearance in "What Comes After" that led to the current division between the survivor communities.

== Reception ==
=== Critical reception ===
"Evolution" received positive reviews from critics. On Rotten Tomatoes, the episode has an approval rating of 81% with an average score of 7.4 out of 10, based on 21 reviews. The critical consensus reads: "The Walking Dead delivers an unnerving midseason cliffhanger -- and a new and terrifying threat -- although some viewers may feel that the ghoulish Whisperers are a retread of the same old antagonists with a new, rotting face.

=== Ratings ===
"Evolution" received a total viewership of 5.09 million with a 2.0 rating in adults aged 18–49. It was the highest-rated cable program of the night and the episode increased in viewership from the previous week.
