= The Storm (The Walking Dead) =

- The Walking Dead episode
- Episode no.: Season 9 Episode 16
- Directed by: Greg Nicotero
- Written by: Angela Kang; Matthew Negrete
- Cinematography by: Stephen Campbell
- Editing by: Alan Cody
- Original air date: March 31, 2019
- Running time: 46 minutes

Guest appearances
- Eleanor Matsuura as Yumiko; Cooper Andrews as Jerry; Ryan Hurst as Beta; Nadia Hilker as Magna; Kerry Cahill as Dianne; Cassady McClincy as Lydia; Cailey Fleming as Judith Grimes; Nadine Marissa as Nabila

Episode chronology
← Previous "The Calm Before"	Next → "Lines We Cross"
- The Walking Dead season 9

"The Storm" is the sixteenth and final episode of the ninth season of the post-apocalyptic horror television series The Walking Dead, which aired on AMC on March 31, 2019.

== Plot ==
Several months after the massacre, winter has arrived and the Kingdom has fallen due to burst pipes, rot, and fires, and is unable to keep up its infrastructure. Ezekiel makes the decision to abandon the Kingdom, assembling a large caravan of the remaining survivors to seek out better shelter at the Hilltop, though not before he broadcasts their situation via radio to anyone who might be listening; Daryl, Michonne, and Yumiko help to escort them. They discuss the Hilltop's issues of leadership following Tara's death, noting that Maggie has opted to stay with Georgie and her group even after sending her several requests to return. After dealing with rogue walkers, Ezekiel tells Daryl that he wants a fresh start with Carol at the Hilltop, stating "it would be easier if it was just us." Daryl asks if that is also what Carol wants.

Meanwhile, Lydia wanders into the forest and finds a walker half-buried in ice. She takes off her glove while crying and offers her hand to the walker to commit suicide, but stops when Carol appears and follows her back to the group. With the storm building up and nowhere close to a way station, Michonne decides to take the group to the abandoned Sanctuary. The abandoned factory provides shelter from the storm, but it becomes clear that they do not have the supplies to wait it out. Reviewing maps, they recognize that if they cross the boundary to the Whisperers' land and traverse a frozen river, they can quickly reach a safe way station within a day.

At Alexandria, with the approaching storm taking out their solar power, Gabriel concocts a plan to group up next to large fireplaces in the church and in Aaron's house and realizes they'll have to free Negan from his cell so he doesn't freeze; the residents take shelter in the church. Eugene later discovers that the fireplace in the church is blocked off and cannot be used safely, and so they decide that they need to relocate to Aaron's house. They all tie a rope around themselves and head out into the blizzard. As they cross through the windy snowfall at sub-freezing temperatures, Judith hears Dog barking in the distance and chases after him, forcing Negan to race after her, but he gets injured from flying debris. He hears Dog barking and finds Judith, who is beginning to suffer from hypothermia; Negan carries Judith and leads Dog back to the group, despite his injury.

Using the cover of the storm, the Kingdom's group passes the pikes into Alpha's territory, only finding some frozen walkers along the way, and arrive at a river that has been frozen over. Carol goes looking for Lydia, who has disappeared, while the rest deal with rising walkers buried in the snow. She eventually catches up to Lydia, who believes she's to blame for their situation and feels she can't stay with them. Lydia asks Carol to kill her, but Carol refuses Lydia's request and tells her that she is not weak. The group eventually makes it to the way station and soon reaches the Hilltop the next day. There, Carol tells Ezekiel that she plans to go with Daryl back to Alexandria and subsequently breaks up with him. Daryl, Michonne, Carol, Lydia, and a few others prepare to depart and continue on to Alexandria, leaving Ezekiel in charge of the Hilltop.

Eventually, Daryl's group reaches Alexandria as the storm subsides. Michonne is elated to see Judith and R.J. In the infirmary, Michonne goes to talk to Negan, who is being treated for his wound; she thanks him for saving Judith. He compliments her on having the guts to cross through the Whisperers' territory. In their camp, Alpha reminds Beta that she'll need to be strong for what comes next and Beta assures her she will be. Per Alpha's request, Beta flogs her arm with a branch to make her stronger, leaving several lashes on her arm, as she used to do to Lydia. At the Hilltop, Ezekiel converses with Judith via radio to catch up and tells her that just because they left their house doesn't mean they lost their home. They finish talking and Ezekiel exits the room. The radio then picks up a faint transmission and a woman's voice comes through asking if anybody is out there.

== Production ==
Despite the demise of the characters of Tara Chambler (Alanna Masterson) and Enid (Katelyn Nacon), their actors names appear in the opening credits.

While showrunner Angela Kang stated that the faint radio message heard at the end of the episode was meant to be a mystery to be explored in season ten, many journalists believe it is helping to set up the show to follow into the comic's Commonwealth arc, which occurs after the war with the Whisperers. In the comic book series, Eugene uses the radio to contact a member of the Commonwealth and learns it is a thriving thousands-strong survivor community in Ohio, and eventually a small scouting party from the allied communities travel there. At the time that "The Storm" aired, the comic book series was still in the middle of the Commonwealth arc.

The episode was shot at Pinewood Atlanta Studios in Fayetteville, Georgia.

== Reception ==
=== Critical reception ===
"The Storm" received critical acclaim from critics. On Rotten Tomatoes, the episode has an approval rating of 90% with an average score of 7.33 out of 10, based on 20 reviews. The site's critical consensus reads, "Hell freezes over in a wintry The Walking Dead finale that takes full advantage of "The Storm" with some chilly scares and a meditative, mournful tone—although this elegiac installment arguably would have best worked as a preamble instead of a denouement."

Aaron Neuwirth of We Live Entertainment gave a positive review of the episode, writing: "While filming in Georgia certainly doesn’t lend itself to frequent episodes like this, it’s an impressive look for the show to embrace massive blizzards, mounds of snow, and even an icy lake. As a cold way to bring an end to a pretty consistently strong set of episodes (a nice change of pace for this series), The Walking Dead did a lot with this contemplative episode."

Alex McLevy of The A.V. Club gave the episode a B saying: "The show has always tended to follow up installments in which noteworthy characters die with brooding and meditative stories, moments in which both audience and characters can stop and take stock of where they are, reevaluating themselves and asking if it’s all still worth it. And for all the live-or-die snowbound action of the episode, “The Storm” is very much in line with this tradition, a reflection on grief in the wake of trauma, and how it can quietly have significant unforeseen consequences, even weeks or months later."

=== Ratings ===
"The Storm" received a total viewership of 5.02 million (in the USA on the day of release) with a 1.9 rating in adults aged 18–49. It was the highest-rated cable program of the night, and increased in viewership from the previous week as well being the highest-rated episode since the midseason premiere. However, it was the lowest-rated season finale of the series.
