= Who Are You Now? (The Walking Dead) =

- The Walking Dead episode
- Episode no.: Season 9 Episode 6
- Directed by: Larry Teng
- Written by: Eddie Guzelian
- Cinematography by: Stephen Campbell
- Editing by: Dan Liu
- Original air date: November 11, 2018
- Running time: 53 minutes

Guest appearances
- Eleanor Matsuura as Yumiko; Dan Fogler as Luke; Cooper Andrews as Jerry; Nadia Hilker as Magna; Rhys Coiro as Jed; Lauren Ridloff as Connie; Cailey Fleming as Judith Grimes; Matt Lintz as Henry; Traci Dinwiddie as Regina; Lindsley Register as Laura; Angel Theory as Kelly; Matt Magnum as DJ

Episode chronology
← Previous "What Comes After"	Next → "Stradivarius"
- The Walking Dead season 9

"Who Are You Now?" is the sixth episode of the ninth season of the post-apocalyptic horror television series The Walking Dead, which aired on AMC on November 11, 2018. This episode is the first not to have Andrew Lincoln credited in the main cast billing as Rick Grimes and the first not to have Lauren Cohan (Maggie Greene) credited since season 2.

This episode marks the first appearance of The Whisperers, a prominent antagonistic group featured in the comics following the defeat of Negan and the Saviors.

== Plot ==
Michonne narrates over scenes of the survivors continuing to rebuild their various communities and struggling to survive, six years after Rick Grimes' apparent death.

Judith leads Magna's group to Aaron, Eugene, Laura, and Rosita, who are hesitant about protecting them, but Judith insists. They travel to Alexandria, just as Michonne returns from a scavenging run. Michonne sizes them up and knows that Judith did not follow the proper procedure for bringing new survivors in, but agrees to let them stay overnight and to hear their case the following morning in front of their council which includes the former high-ranking Savior Laura, now a trusted member of the community.

At the Kingdom, Ezekiel recognizes the needs to have a trained blacksmith to help effect repairs, and decides to have Henry travel to Hilltop to be apprenticed in the art. Carol brings Henry along with a number of supplies she plans to bring to the Hilltop too. En route, they are attacked by the remains of the Saviors, aside from those who joined the other communities, led by Carol's old enemy Jed and former Savior lieutenant Regina. Jed reveals that the Sanctuary has fallen and the remaining Saviors have become marauders to survive. They steal the supplies, among them the ring that Ezekiel gave to Carol, and promise they will never see them again. That night, after setting up camp, Carol sneaks out to find the Saviors camp, douses the area in gasoline, and sets them ablaze, killing them while recovering her ring. They continue on the next day they rendezvous with Daryl who has taken to living on his own.

In the morning, the council asks Magna's group questions similar to what Rick would ask of potential allies. While the other council members seem accepting of their answers, Michonne sees that Magna has a prison tattoo, and a hidden knife, and demands she explain herself. She cannot do so, and the council votes to have them evicted from the community after Yumiko is treated.

Rosita and Eugene go to take some radio equipment to set up on a nearby water tower for Gabriel, who is trying to see if any other communities can make contact. They note that a large herd had passed, but believe it will not interfere with their goal. As Eugene places the radio equipment, he spots the horde now aiming for them. He spooks their horses as he tries to climb down, and Rosita rushes to recover essential gear from their wagon. Eugene is forced to jump the last bit off the tower and injures his leg, and after Rosita gets him a shovel as a makeshift crutch, the two escape.

Judith, who has developed a rapport with the imprisoned Negan, is upset at Michonne for not trusting her. Michonne mulls over her decision as she tends to her and Rick's child, Rick Jr. (RJ). As the group is about to be evicted, Michonne has a change of heart and says they likely will be able to stay over at Hilltop, and will escort them personally there along with Siddiq and former Savior D.J. to watch over Yumiko's recovery.

As Eugene and Rosita make it into the woods, the horde surprisingly stays on their tail, and only once they find a wet ditch and cover themselves in mud does the horde seem to ignore their presence. They hear faint whispers of "Where are they?" and "They must be close, don't let them get away" as the horde passes.

== Production ==
From this episode, Daryl Dixon (Norman Reedus) becomes the main protagonist of the series. This is the first episode broadcast following the departure of Andrew Lincoln as Rick Grimes, which included a six-year time jump from the events of his apparent death. Among changes include Khary Payton (King Ezekiel) being promoted to the main cast as his name appears in the opening credits. The episode is last for Regina (Traci Dinwiddie). This episode introduces Matt Lintz as the older Henry; Matt is the older brother of Macsen Lintz who had played Henry in previous seasons, and brother to Madison Lintz, who had played Carol's daughter Sophia on the first two seasons of the show.

This is the first episode to feature a significant appearance by the Whisperers, which in the comics are a group of human survivors that wear the skin of walkers to mask themselves, and speak only in whispers to avoid drawing the walkers' attention. Within the comics, Rick's son, Carl Grimes, was an essential element to that arc, but within the show, Carl (Chandler Riggs) had been killed off in the middle of the eighth season. According to showrunner Angela Kang, to adapt the comic's story, they plan on taking some of the role that Carl had and giving them to Judith, now aged similarly to Carl, which allows them to follow the main threads of the comic's Whisperer arc but with a new take using Judith's personality.

== Reception ==
=== Critical reception ===
"Who Are You Now?" received positive reviews from critics. On Rotten Tomatoes, the episode has an approval rating of 83% with an average score of 6.92 out of 10, based on 16 reviews. The critical consensus reads: "Who Are You Now?" swiftly establishes a new world order in The Walking Dead without Rick Grimes, effectively conveying the progression of the survivors, but some viewers may feel adrift in what feels like the umpteenth re-set for the series.

Erik Kain of Forbes praised the episode and the reboot of the series, saying "I'm still shocked by how good The Walking Dead has gotten, and while I was worried before (and still have some doubts) I don't think it's going to suffer too much without Rick. His "death" serves as an interesting catalyst for character growth throughout the community, as they no longer have the luxury of one leader calling all the shots."

=== Ratings ===
"Who Are You Now?" received a total viewership of 5.40 million with a 2.0 rating in adults aged 18–49. It was the highest-rated cable program of the night, and the episode was steady in viewership from the previous week.
