= What Comes After (The Walking Dead) =

- The Walking Dead episode
- Rick stands among the corpses of his friends and allies in a lucid dream state. This scene was inspired by an alternate cover art for Issue #100 of The Walking Dead comic series.
- Episode no.: Season 9 Episode 5
- Directed by: Greg Nicotero
- Story by: Scott M. Gimple; Matthew Negrete
- Teleplay by: Matthew Negrete
- Cinematography by: Duane Manwiller
- Editing by: Evan Schrodek
- Original air date: November 4, 2018
- Running time: 45 minutes

Guest appearances
- Jon Bernthal as Shane Walsh; Sonequa Martin-Green as Sasha Williams; Scott Wilson as Hershel Greene; Eleanor Matsuura as Yumiko; Dan Fogler as Luke; Cooper Andrews as Jerry; Nadia Hilker as Magna; Lauren Ridloff as Connie; Cailey Fleming and Chloe Garcia-Frizzi as Judith Grimes; Sydney Park as Cyndie; Kerry Cahill as Dianne; Nicole Barré as Kathy; Aaron Farb as Norris; Kenric Green as Scott; Traci Dinwiddie as Regina; Angel Theory as Kelly; Briana Venskus as Beatrice; Sarah Wayne Callies as Lori Grimes (voice); Emily Kinney as Beth Greene (voice); Michael Cudlitz as Abraham Ford (voice); Lennie James as Morgan Jones (voice)

Episode chronology
← Previous "The Obliged"	Next → "Who Are You Now?"
- The Walking Dead season 9

"What Comes After" is the fifth episode of the ninth season of the post-apocalyptic horror television series The Walking Dead, which aired on AMC on November 4, 2018. The episode's teleplay was written by Matthew Negrete, from a story by Scott M. Gimple and Negrete, and it was directed by Greg Nicotero. In the episode, a heavily wounded Rick Grimes struggles to divert a zombie herd while he questions his legacy in maintaining his vision of the united communities.

This episode included guest appearances by former regular cast members Jon Bernthal (Shane Walsh), Sonequa Martin-Green (Sasha Williams), Scott Wilson (Hershel Greene), Sarah Wayne Callies (Lori Grimes), Emily Kinney (Beth Greene), Michael Cudlitz (Abraham Ford), and Lennie James (Morgan Jones). It was Wilson's penultimate on-screen appearance before his death in real life. It also marks the final appearances of Andrew Lincoln (Rick Grimes), and Pollyanna McIntosh (Anne). It was also the last appearance for Lauren Cohan (Maggie Greene) in the season, due to other acting commitments. She returned to the show late in the second part of season 10 and became a series regular in the third part of season 10, as does Lincoln himself in a guest appearance during the series finale.

== Plot ==
Rick dreams of a swarm of helicopters, before regaining consciousness and finding himself surrounded by walkers, bleeding profusely from his abdomen. Using his belt, Rick manages to free himself off the rebar he had been impaled on after being thrown off by his spooked horse, bloodied but unbowed. He makes it back to his horse, barely holding onto consciousness to lead the merged walker hordes away from the construction camp. Getting enough of a lead, he finds an abandoned cabin nearby to create makeshift bandages, before leading the hordes onward. Throughout this, Rick falls in and out of consciousness and has lucid dreams of him trying to find his family, which includes conversations with Shane and Hershel, both of whom urge him to wake back up to reality and stay ahead of the horde.

Anne is trying to make her way to a planned rendezvous point in Heath's stolen RV, and is told by the man on the other end of the walkie-talkie that she had misled them before. She assures them she has the "A" they need and needs to get out of this place. Maggie continues onto Alexandria; Michonne hears of this and intercepts her before she reaches the cage where Negan is being kept. Maggie is able to convince Michonne to hand over the keys, telling her she will be able to live with this decision. Negan taunts and mocks Maggie about how much he enjoyed killing Glenn as well as detailing his death to her, but she remains steadfast despite being agitated by him over his taunting of the event. Negan soon starts begging her to kill him so he can be with his late wife, Lucille. Thinking it's another trick, Maggie angrily pulls and roughly throws Negan out of the cell into the light, and sees that he is a shadow of his former, tyrannical self. Maggie puts him back in his cell, walking out satisfied, with a better understanding of why Rick kept him alive. She and Michonne then hear word of trouble outside from Dianne, and race to see what is happening with other residents.

In another vision, Rick walks onto a field filled with the bodies of all his friends, where he speaks to Sasha, who reminds him that all he has done has been for the good of all. Sasha tells him that he will find his family, as they are not lost. Rick then awakens to find himself on the ground at the now-abandoned camp, with the horse having fled. With walkers - including zombified savior member Norris, Oceanside resident Kathy and community members from the clash at the camp - closing in on him, Rick keeps on leading them toward the bridge. He stumbles just short of the bridge, but as the walkers near him, he sees Michonne lead a large group of his allies to dispatch the walkers. Michonne urges Rick to keep on fighting, and Rick comes to realize that Michonne and his friends are now his family. He realizes this is just another vision; he finds himself alone just off the bridge with the horde still following him, passed out on the ground. He gets back up and continues to lead the walkers across the bridge as the river waters rise. To Rick's dismay, the weight of the walkers is not sufficient to cause the bridge to fall. A group from the united communities – including Saviors – arrive and begin killing off the walkers near Rick. Maggie worries that if the walkers cross, they will continue onto Hilltop, and leads a group to try to turn the horde around, but Rick waves them off, muttering to himself that he found his family. Rick sees some of the dynamite left on the bridge, and fires at it, seemingly sacrificing himself destroying the bridge and most of the walker horde, causing the remaining to fall into the river. To his allies, Rick appears to have been killed in the explosion, and several break out in tears of grief.

Anne sees the smoke from the explosion and chatter over the walkie-talkies about Rick's apparent death while a helicopter lands nearby. She sees Rick lying on the bank of the river, clinging to life and severely injured. She tells the pilot that she has a "B" and convinces the helicopter to save his life, claiming she wants to save a friend who saved her; Rick and Anne are both flown away to the Civic Republic of Philadelphia.

Six years later, a small group of survivors, Magna, Connie, Kelly, Yumiko, and Luke are trying to hold off a walker horde when a few are shot from a forest nearby. The group is told to take cover, and find that they have been rescued by a now-preteen Judith Grimes, who wears Carl's hat and is armed with Rick's revolver and a katana like Michonne.

== Production ==
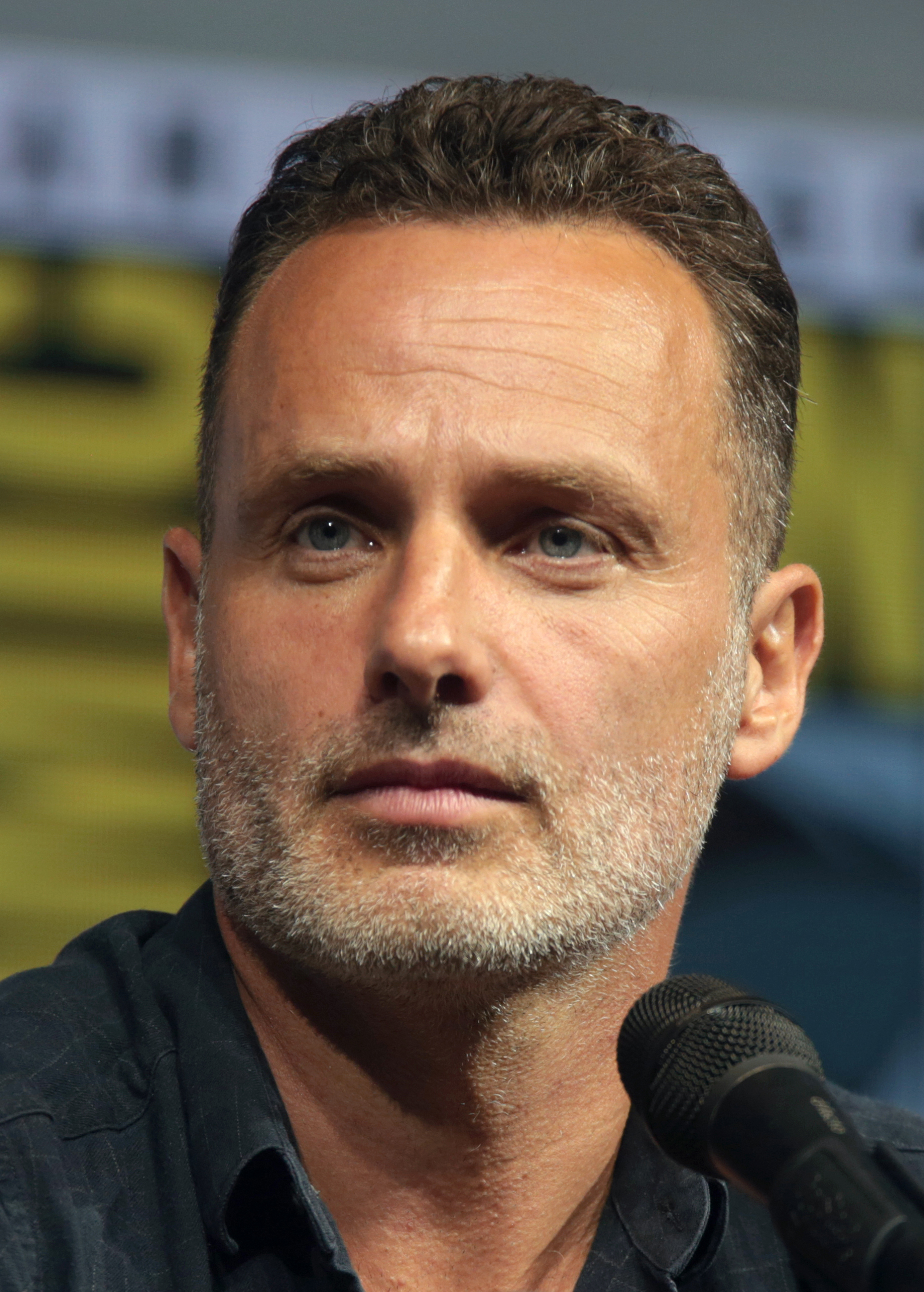
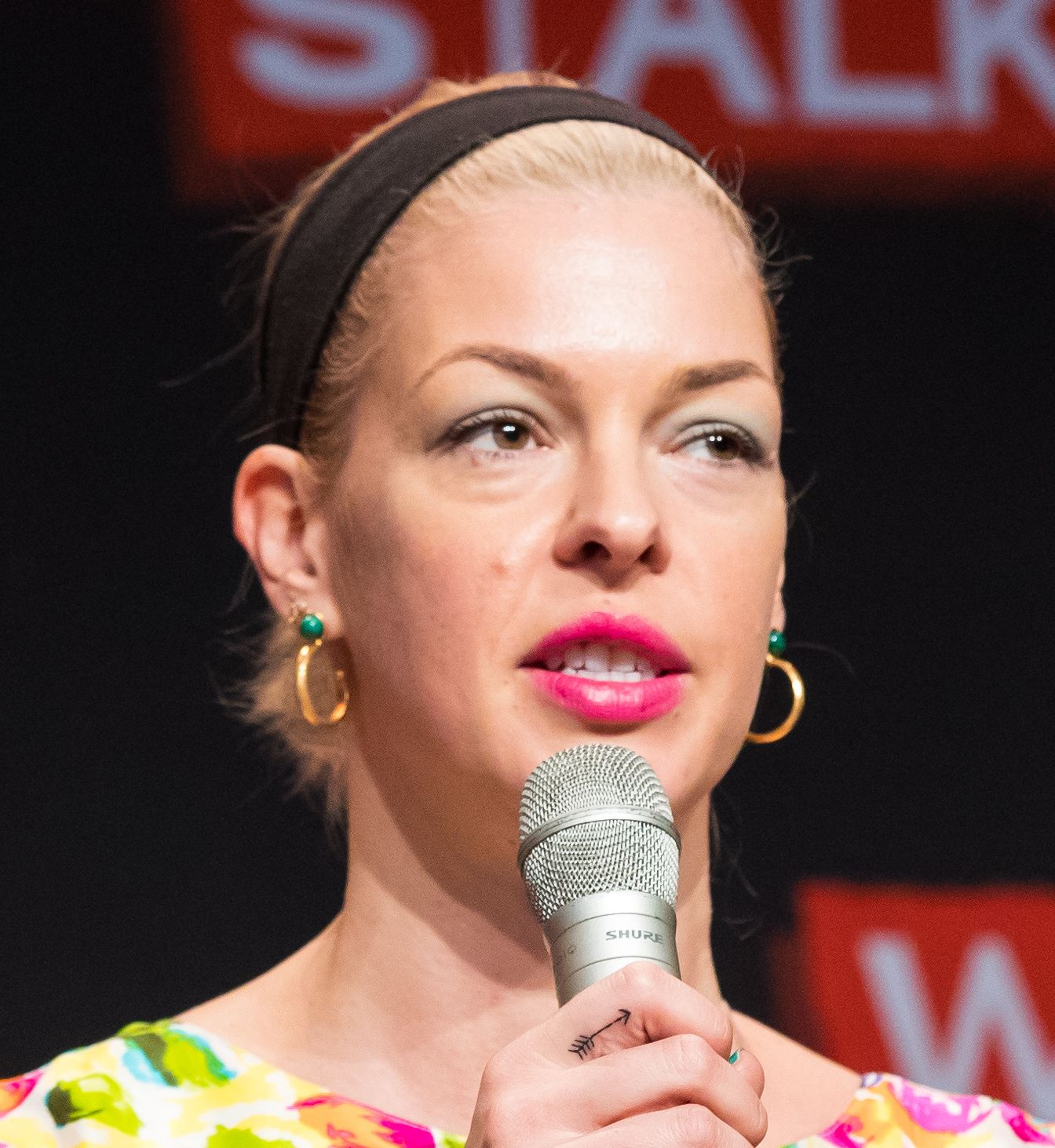
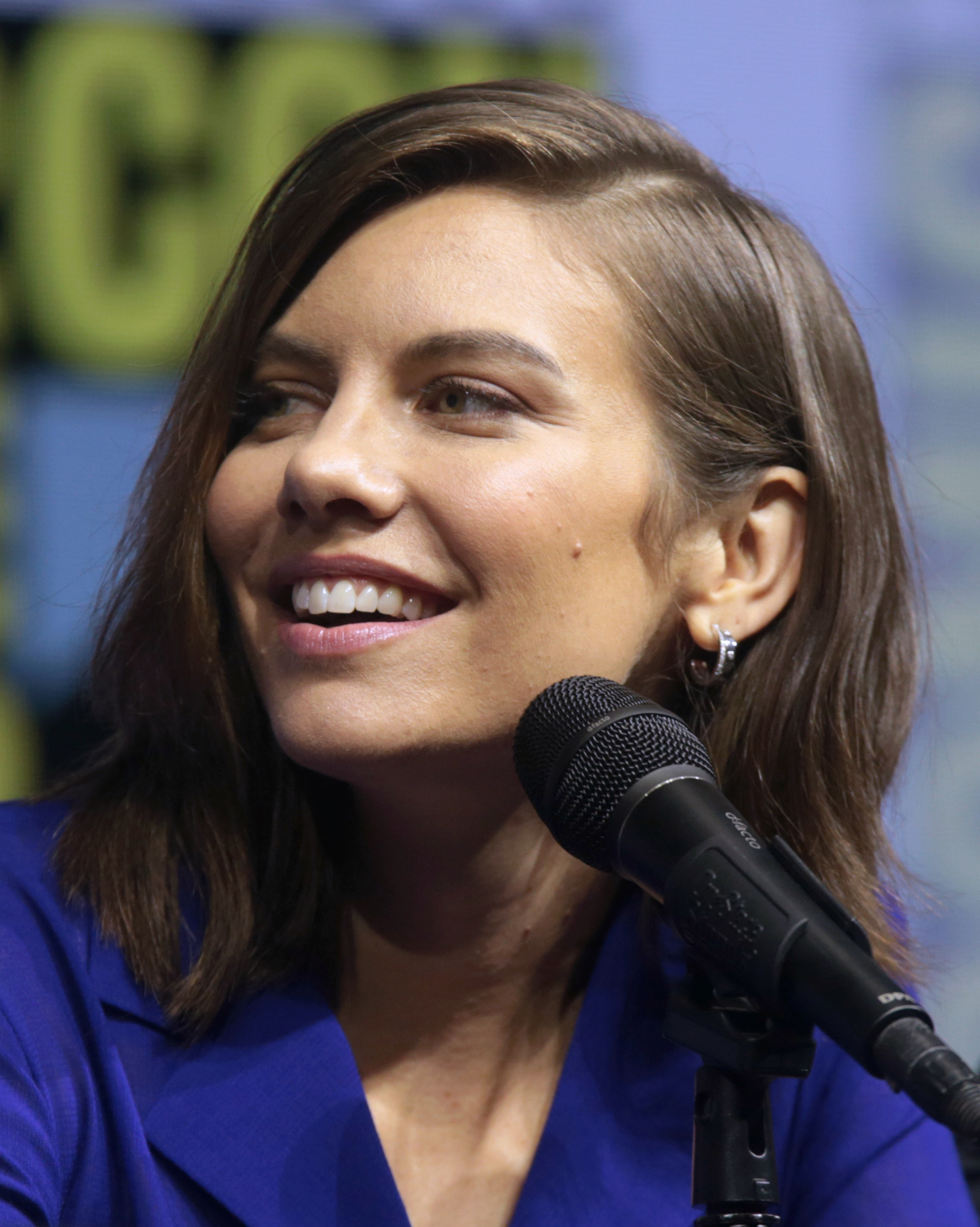
This episode marks the last appearances of Andrew Lincoln (Rick Grimes) and Pollyanna McIntosh (Anne) on the show, and the last appearance in the season for Lauren Cohan (Maggie Greene) due to further acting commitments.

This episode marks the last appearance of both Andrew Lincoln (Rick Grimes) as well as Pollyanna McIntosh (Jadis/Anne). Both actors were planned to take a role in a series of three AMC Original Films to continue Rick's story, with production on the first to initially start in 2019. Lincoln had been working with Scott Gimple, the former showrunner and now current content manager for all of AMC's The Walking Dead properties, about how Rick's story could continue for some time. They had established early on that it needed to involve Jadis and the helicopter, and established these elements in earlier seasons to prepare for this point. Showrunner Angela Kang also confirmed that this episode would be the last episode of this season for Lauren Cohan as Maggie, due to previous commitments she had made for the show Whiskey Cavalier prior to signing on for the ninth season, though it is uncertain yet if she will return to the show; Kang stated they have additional stories they can tell with Maggie's character should Cohan be able to return. As to close out Maggie's story, they introduced the scene with Maggie and Negan which took place much later in the comic book series (after the introduction of the Whisperers). This gave them a way to move Maggie forward and beyond her obsession with Negan, should Cohan be able to return.

The cabin that Rick stops to rest was modeled after the cabin from the film The Evil Dead, including a replica of its Necronomicon on the table. The episode's producer, Greg Nicotero, had previously worked on Evil Dead 2.

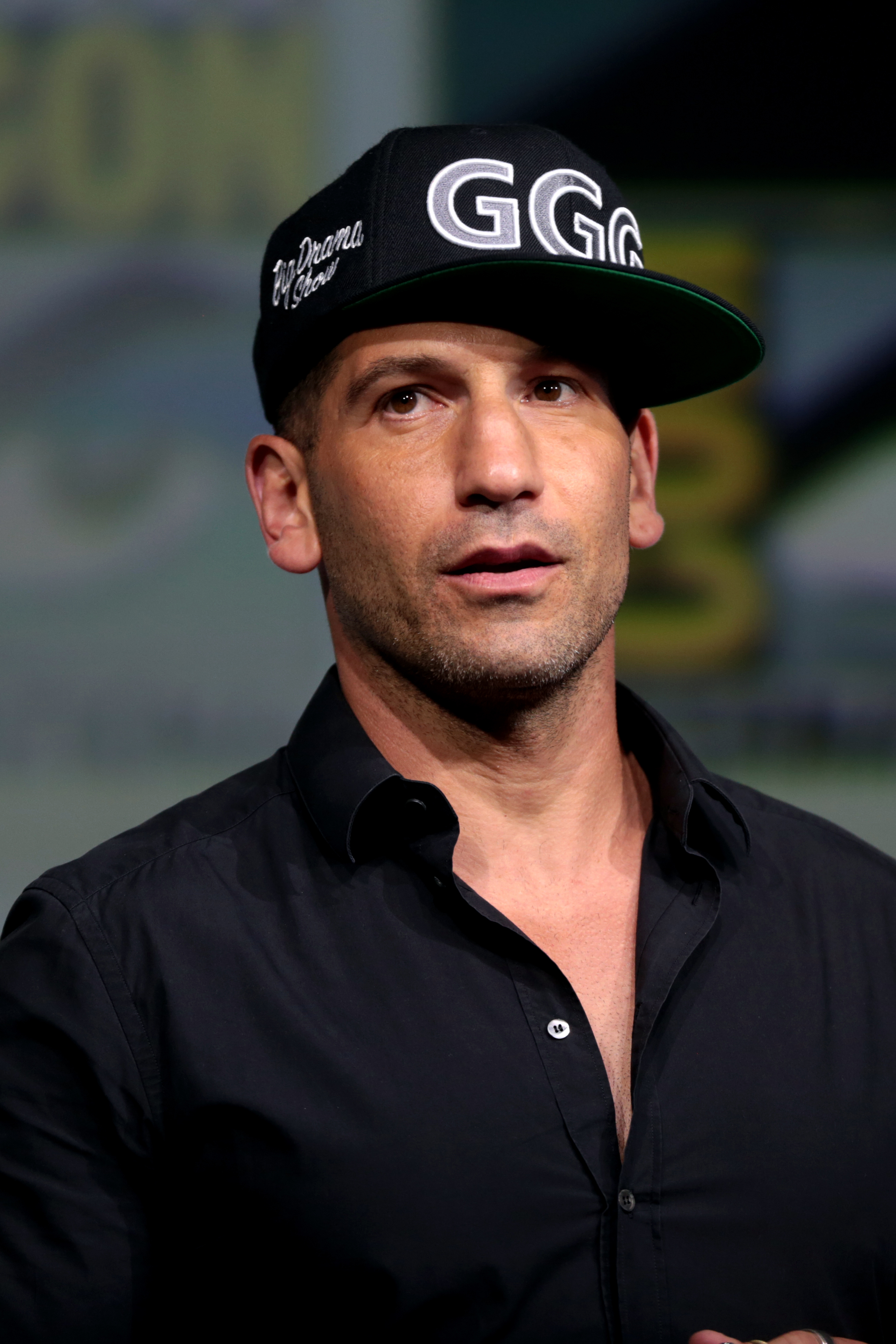
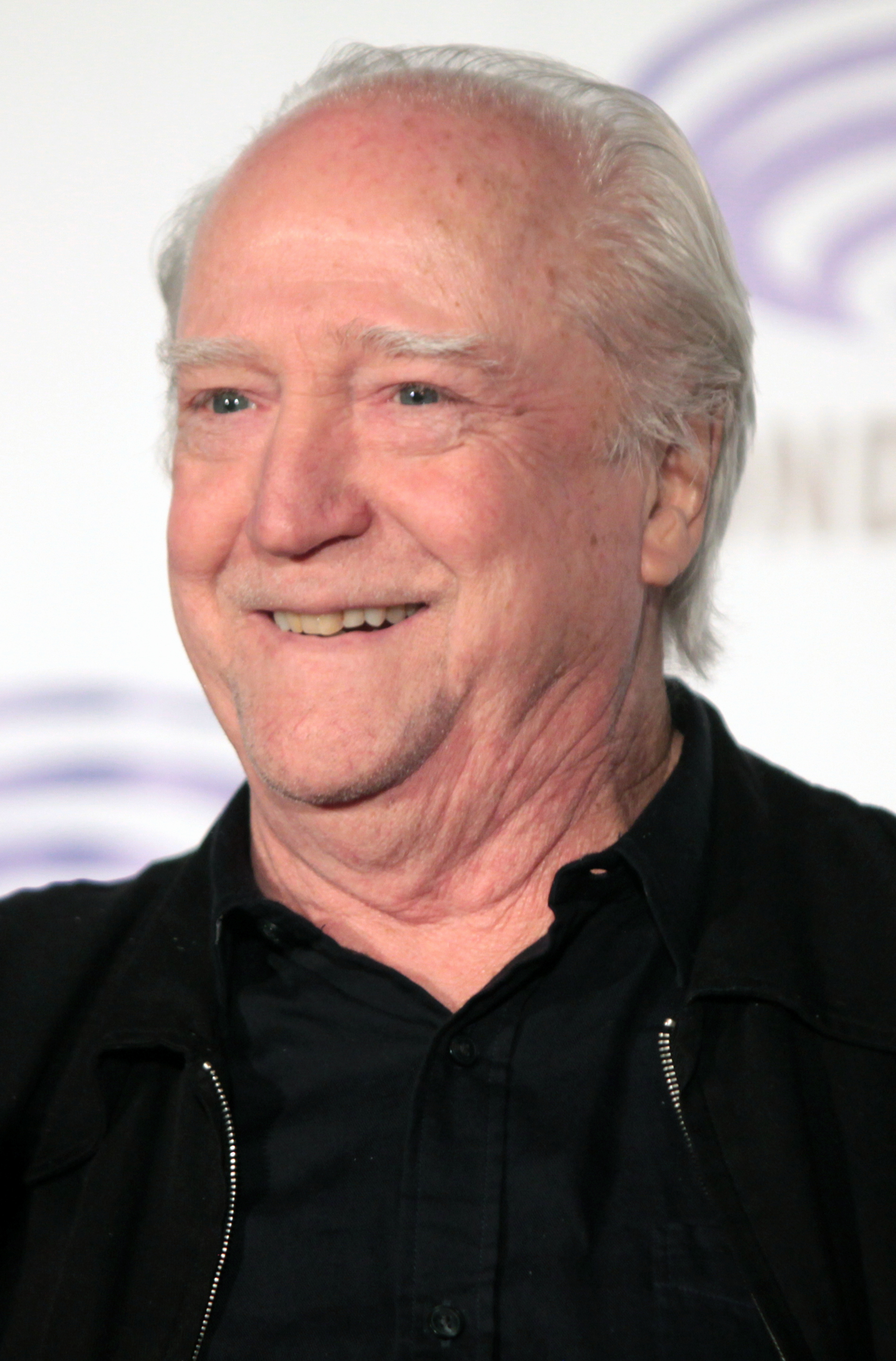
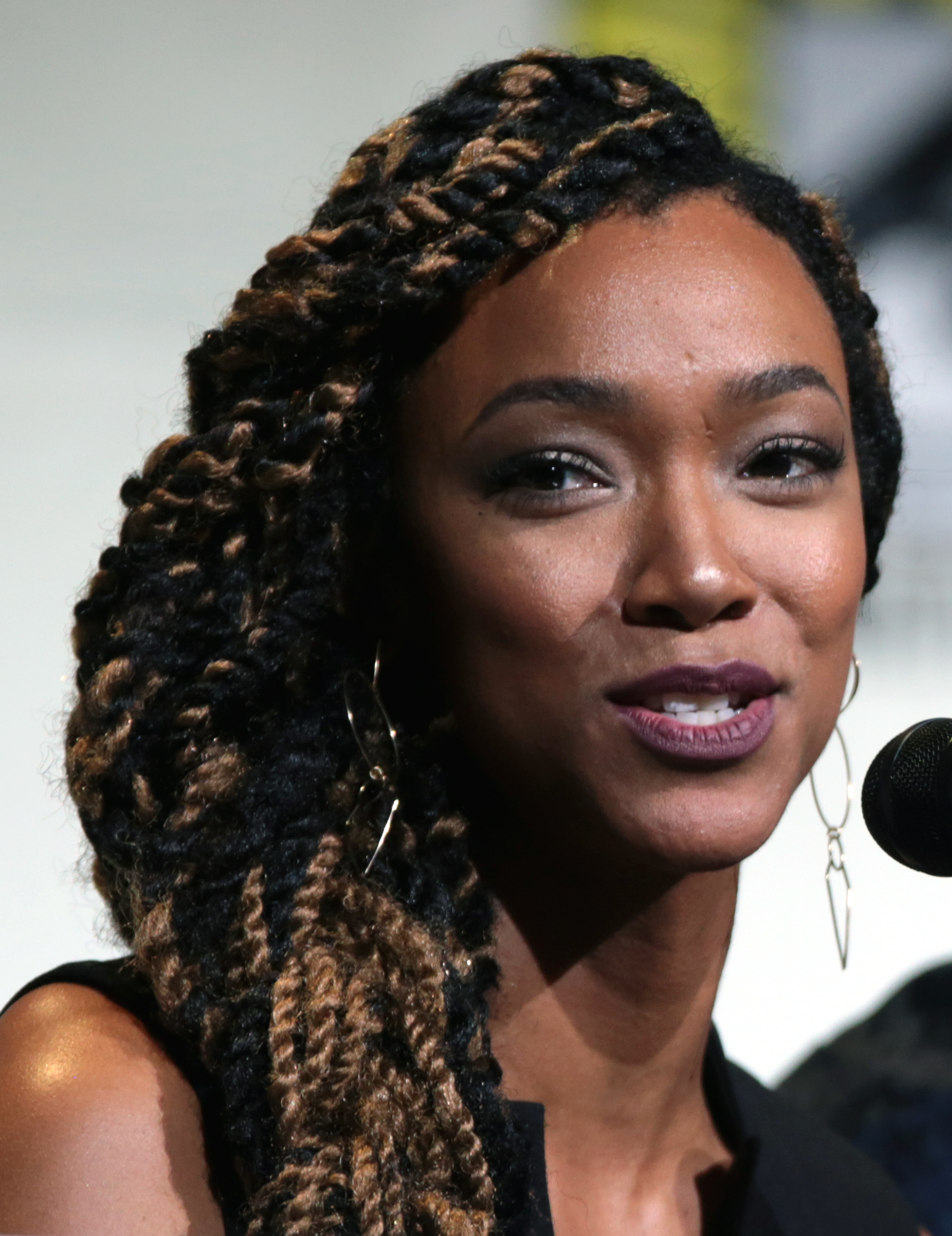
Jon Bernthal (Shane), Scott Wilson (Hershel) and Sonequa Martin-Green (Sasha) reprised their roles in dream sequences, the performances of Wilson, Martin-Green and Bernthal were acclaimed. Wilson died a month before the episode aired.

All of the lucid dream shots were filmed on a sound stage at Raleigh Studios, using green-screen effects for the backgrounds. These scenes were to play on the Third man factor, bringing in people from Rick's past that would help keep him moving as he struggled with his blood loss. This led to some discussion about whom to bring back for these shots between Kang and writers Scott Gimple and Matt Negrete, needed characters that were essential to Rick. Shane, as played by Jon Bernthal, was considered essential given Shane's impact on Rick's story throughout the show. Hershel as played by Scott Wilson was seen as a father-figure to Rick, and Sasha as played by Sonequa Martin-Green was seen as a soldier who knew how to put the bigger picture first in her priorities. They had considered bringing back others like Steven Yeun who played Glenn, but there were scheduling conflicts, and the production felt the three guests they had worked strongest for the story. This ended up being Wilson's last on-screen role before his death; on the day that they announced that Bernthal, Wilson, and Martin-Green would return in guest roles for this episode during the 2018 New York Comic Con in October 2018, Wilson died from complications from leukemia. Additionally, former The Walking Dead actors Lennie James, Sarah Wayne Callies, Emily Kinney, and Michael Cudlitz all provided voice-line cameos as their former characters Morgan Jones, Lori Grimes, Beth Greene, and Abraham Ford respectively as part of Rick's lucid dreams.

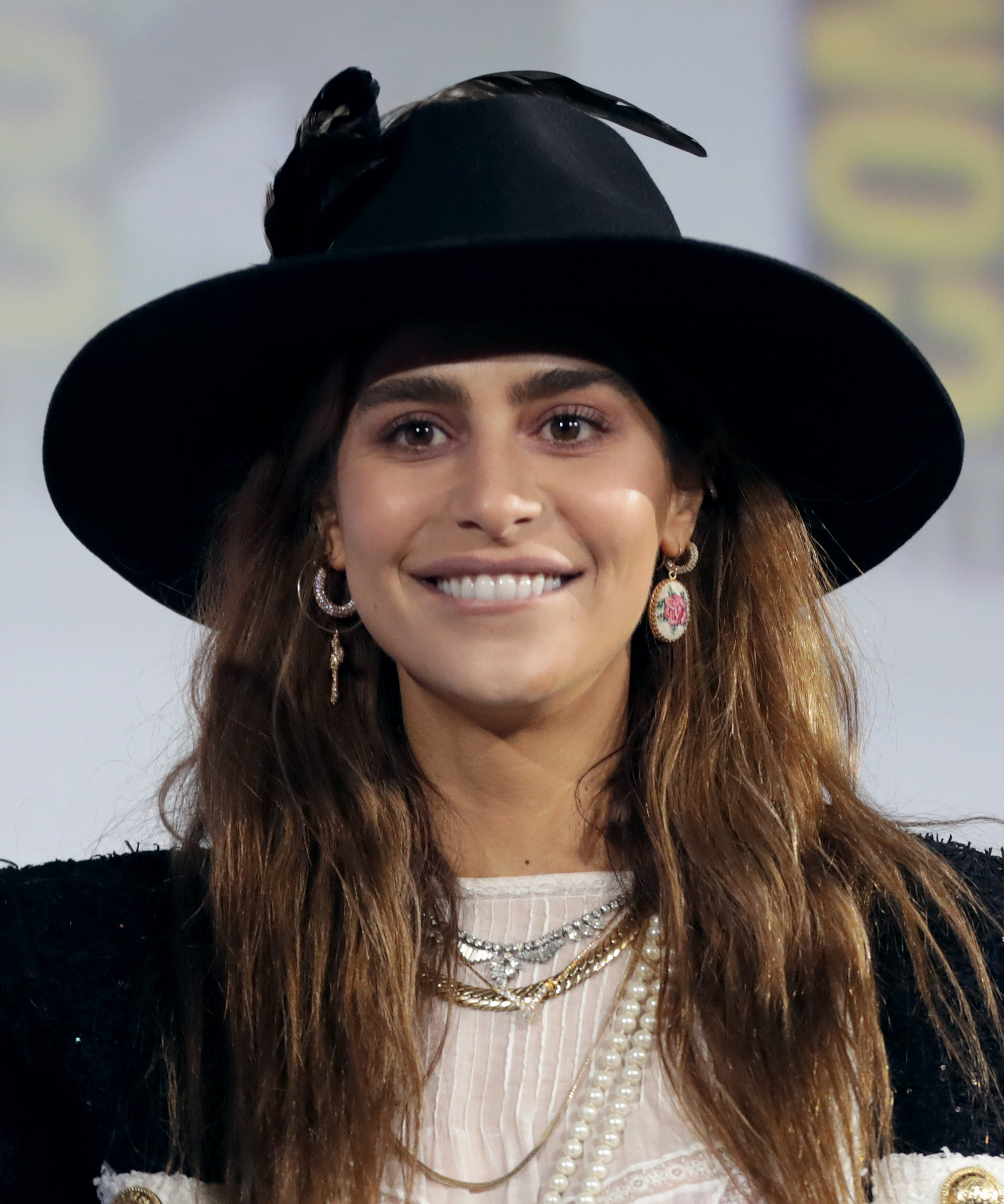
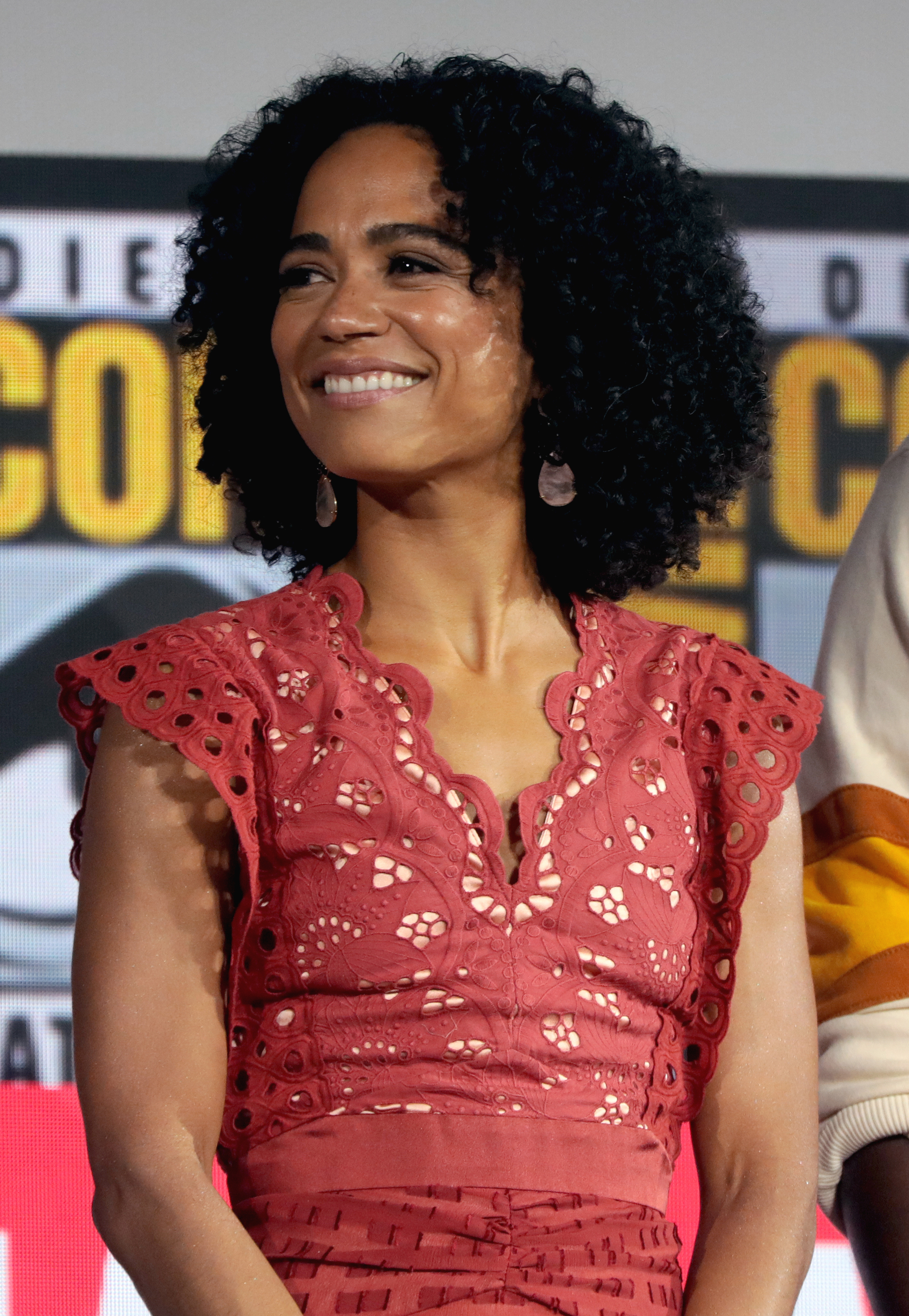
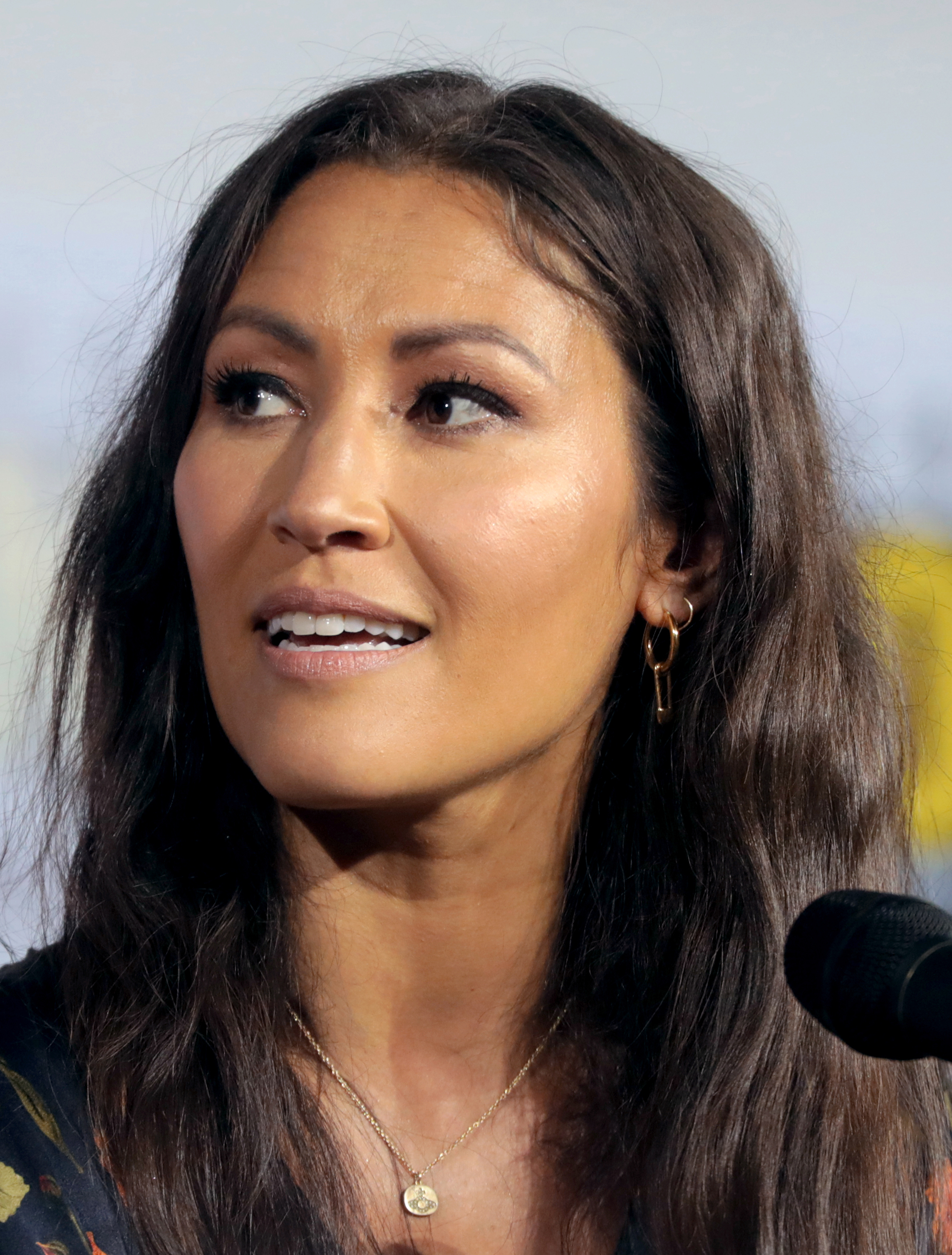
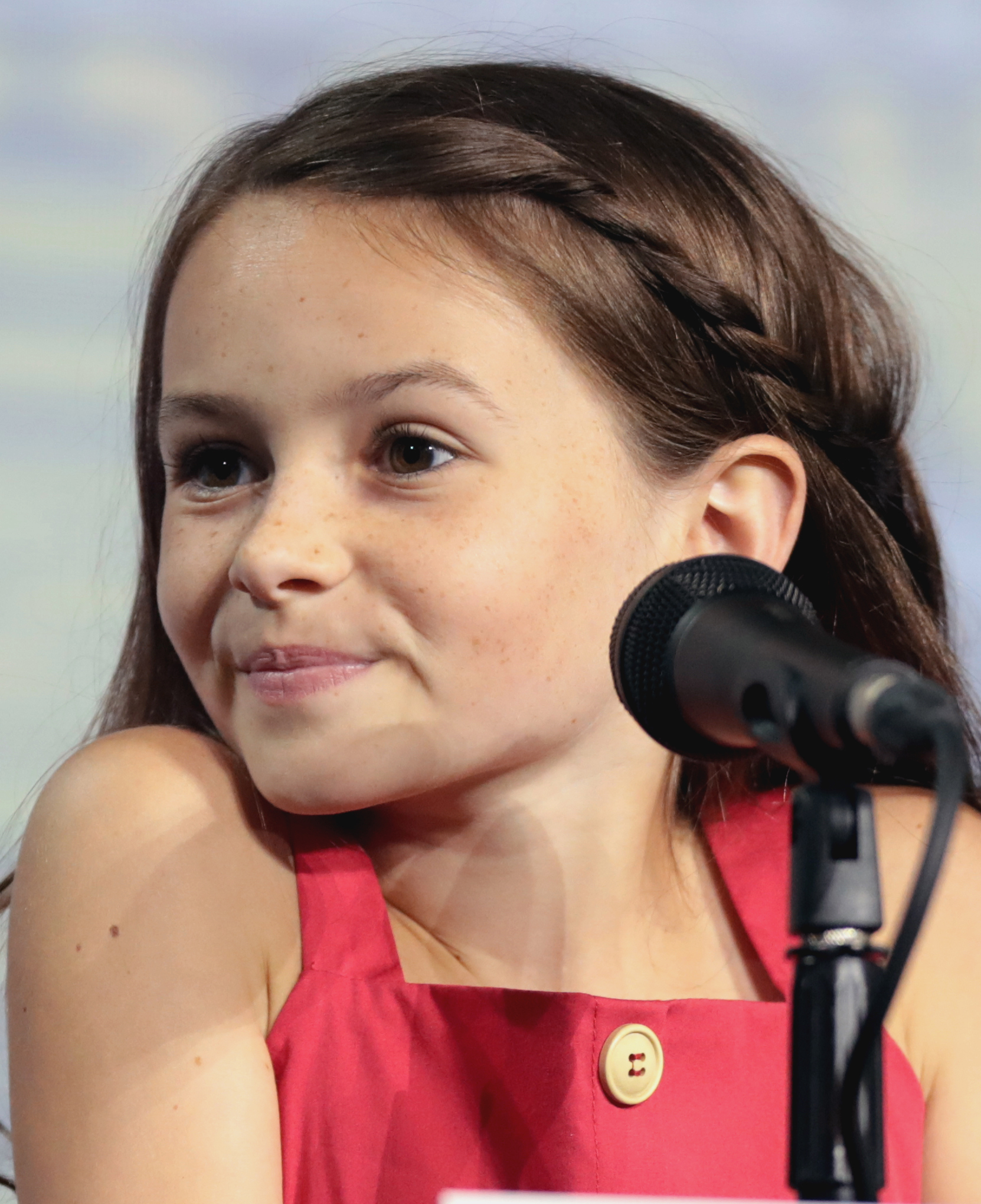
Nadia Hilker, Lauren Ridloff, Eleanor Matsuura and Cailey Fleming make their first appearances in this episode as Magna, Connie, Yumiko and Judith Grimes respectively

The shot of Rick walking among the bodies of those he knew include a mix of his fellow actors, body doubles of former characters, and dummies for other characters. The scene itself was inspired by one of the special covers for issue #100 of the comic book, where Glenn is killed by Negan. This scene was originally to have some of the bodies rise up to make it more harrowing towards Rick, including Negan, but this was ultimately cut. Kang stated they felt that Shane served well-enough as an antagonizing character to Rick but had a friendship and connection with him, while Negan's hostility would have been more direct. The final scenes shot for the episode involved the hospital setting where Rick first woke up in the pilot episode "Days Gone Bye", though with small changes. To further bookend Rick's arc, they reused the song "Space Junk" by Wang Chung which was also featured in "Days Gone Bye".

The episode includes an estimated six-year time jump, according to Kang. The episode introduces Cailey Fleming as an older Judith, as well as the members of Magna's (Nadia Hilker) group, including Lauren Ridloff as Connie, Angel Theory as Kelly, Eleanor Matsuura as Yumiko, and Dan Fogler as Luke, who are key elements related to the Whisperers arc in the comic book series.

== Reception ==
=== Critical reception ===
"What Comes After" received mostly positive reviews from critics, with praise being aimed at Andrew Lincoln's performance and the return of Jon Bernthal as Shane Walsh. On Rotten Tomatoes, the episode has an approval rating of 76% with an average score of 6.4 out of 10, based on 33 reviews, the lowest scoring episode of the season on the site. The critical consensus reads: "'What Comes After' serves as an emotionally raw and rousing farewell to series lead Andrew Lincoln, though some viewers may find Rick Grimes' ambiguous departure more of a cop out than a relief."

Jeff Stone writing for Indiewire praised the episode with a qualification of B and in his review he said: ""What Comes After," at least before things take a serious turn for the bonkers, is a perfectly acceptable, if somewhat, cliché-ridden hour of television, with some extremely welcome returns." Megan McCluskey of Time Magazine praised the Lincoln's development and said: "The Walking Dead has a sprawling cast of characters, but the story at its core has always revolved around Rick's leadership of the group of survivors." Noetta Harjo of Geek Girl Authority praised the episode and wrote: "I was bawling like a baby. I enjoyed all of the callbacks to episode one. And seeing the return of Jon Bernthal, Scott Wilson and Sonequa Martin-Green was heartwarming."

=== Ratings ===
"What Comes After" received a total viewership of 5.41 million with a 2.1 rating in adults aged 18–49. It was the highest-rated cable program of the night, and the episode marked an increase in viewership from the previous week.
