= Yumiko (The Walking Dead) =

Yumiko Okumura
- The Walking Dead character
- Yumiko Okumura, as she appears in the comic book series (left) and as portrayed by Eleanor Matsuura in the television series (right).
- First appearance: Comic: "Issue #127" (2014); Television: "What Comes After" (2018)
- Last appearance: Comic: "Issue #193" (2019); Television: "Rest in Peace" (2022)
- Created by: Robert Kirkman
- Adapted by: Angela Kang (The Walking Dead)
- Portrayed by: Eleanor Matsuura; Courtney Chen (stand in for the episode "Splinter")

In-universe information
- Occupation: Comic: Member of the Militia; Television: Criminal Defense Lawyer; Hilltop Council Member
- Family: Television: Tomichi Okumura (brother)
- Spouses: Television: Magna (wife)
- Significant others: Comic: Magna (girlfriend)

Yumiko (full name in the television series: Yumiko Okumura) is a fictional character in the comic book series The Walking Dead and the television series of the same name, where she is portrayed by Eleanor Matsuura. In both universes, Yumiko is part of a small group of roaming survivors that is led by her girlfriend, Magna, and as in the comic books, she is an LGBT character like Tara Chambler, Aaron, and Jesus.

== Appearances ==
=== Comic book series ===
Yumiko is part of a group of survivors from Richmond who joins the Alexandria Safe-Zone two years after the fall of Negan and the Saviors. At the beginning of the apocalypse, Yumiko is one of many survivors who arrive at a nursing home near Washington D.C. As they moved through the east side of Washington, a massive herd of walkers that was being routed by Jesus and other residents of Alexandria took Magna's group by surprise, causing them to lose their trailer and other belongings, as well as one of its members.

After being rescued and taken to Alexandria, Yumiko and her group were interviewed by Rick and Andrea in order to allow them to stay, and although at first they felt comfortable with the community they soon began to distrust the idyllic life they led. When Rick is absent in Alexandria, Yumiko and the group discover a prison. They find Negan, who tells them that Rick and his people are animals that torture him and begs them to release him, but Magna refused as she knew that Negan was lying.

During the war against the Whisperers, like Magna, Yumiko was a very important member of the militia, helping them win the war against the Whisperers and, after the death of Rick, Yumiko and her girlfriend Magna live together in the Commonwealth.

=== Television series ===
==== Season 9 ====
Yumiko appears for the first time in "What Comes After" while escaping from a herd of walkers. Yumiko, like the rest of her group, defended themselves from the walkers while trying to escape, hurts her head and the group overwhelmed with Yumiko out of combat the group can hardly keep fighting and although they ended up being surrounded by them and subsequently rescued by an unknown person. Making their way through the wood, a wound Yumiko is carried by her friends inside the forest and discovered a little girl who had rescued them; she later introduced herself as Judith Grimes.

In "Who Are You Now?", after meeting the rest of Judith's group and being escorted to Alexandria, Yumiko was quickly taken to the infirmary of the place so that her wounds could be treated by Siddiq. Although her injuries were healing and stabilized, Yumiko did not wake up from her deep sleep while being visited by the rest of her group and because she was the only one in the team not to be stripped of her weapons, Magna took her necklace with a sharp blade as a defense weapon against any threat that arises. Once she regained her consciousness the next morning with the news that they were leaving the community, Yumiko joked with her group stating that she could have hit her head harder to stay longer in the community. However, after a sudden change of mind, Michonne decided to escort Yumiko and the rest of her group to another community where they would be safe instead of sending them back in the open, and decided to escort them to another community they knew.

In "Stradivarius", as they made their way to the Hilltop, Yumiko and the rest of her group made a stop at the place where they were attacked by the herd of walkers and took advantage of the moment to collect all their stuff that they had left behind when they escaped from the herd - among them Bernie's belongings - with which Yumiko tried to convince Magna to take them as a souvenir to her late friend. When Michonne declared that all the weapons they found from Magna's group would be taken by their group, causing Magna to become hostile as she is against the woman's decision, Yumiko became the voice of reason in the middle of the discussion and proposed to her entire group to accept Michonne's terms instead of starting a fight. After spending the night in an abandoned factory and suddenly being ambushed by a pack of walkers, Yumiko claimed her weapons to defend herself and with the use of her bow, she ended up with several walkers that crossed her path; making their way to the horses to escape the undead and finding the zombified Bernie among them. Back on the highway, Yumiko tries to comfort Magna after witnessing their friend turned into a walker, and also were comforted by Michonne, who confessed that she understood the pain of losing someone she considered part of the family.

In "Evolution", after arriving to the Hilltop and reluctantly surrendering their weapons to enter, the fate of Yumiko and her group within the walls was put on hold by Tara, who informed the new arrivals that they could stay in the community while waiting for Jesus' arrival to make a final decision regarding if they could stay in the community. Despite the hospitality of her new home, Magna maintained her suspicions regarding the leader of the community, but accepted her partner's proposal to work hard on what the community would need to gain her place. With the news that Eugene had been hidden from a herd of walkers by Rosita, Yumiko along with Magna decided to go to search for the man and arrived just in time to help Michonne to rescue Jesus, Aaron and Eugene from walkers in an abandoned cemetery. When Jesus confronted the rest of the remaining walkers and prepared to return to the group to escape the walkers, Yumiko and the others watched in horror as he was stabbed in the heart by a walker and without time to lose she helped to retaliate against the armed walkers that were attacking them. After discovering that they were people disguised with walker skin, Magna and her group ended up being surrounded by group of "walkers", who whispers that they were going to die.

In "Adaptation", Yumiko along with her group defended themselves from the group that was attacking them and before leaving, she helped take Jesus' body with them. As they set off to return to the Hilltop, they spotted a small herd of walkers on the bridge where some members of the group that had attacked them in the cemetery. After they killed most of the "walkers", the group was forced to take with them the only survivor of the skirmish in order to interrogate her about her group. After arriving to the Hilltop carrying the bad news of what happened in their mission, Yumiko along with Magna helped lower the body of Jesus from one of the horses that transported him to be buried.

In "Omega", after discovering in the wood the horses that belonged to Luke and Alden who were missing, Yumiko, like the rest of her team, did not lose hope and decided to keep looking, but they were interrupted by Tara, who decided that it will be better to return to the Hilltop for their own safety. Later, when Yumiko proposed to look for Luke on her own despite Tara's orders, Magna was reluctant to think that they could lose the life they had within the community, but nevertheless ended up accepting their demands and subsequently, they left the place in the middle of the night. The large number of walkers forced Yumiko and her group reluctantly to leave the search behind and return to the Hilltop, only to witness the arrival of Alpha and her group at the gates of the community who demanded that they have to give her her daughter.

In "Bounty", from the walls, Yumiko along with other residents of the community were deciding if they should take the fair offer by Alpha that involved two prisoners who had previously been captured by her group in exchange for her daughter who was in captivity within the community. Fortunately, when the exchange was successful, Yumiko along with her group received Luke at the entrance and subsequently decided to celebrate their reunion by drinking during the night.

In "Chokepoint", Yumiko was part of a team who escorted the residents of the community to the fair and after noticing Kelly's concern about her sister's whereabouts, she assured her that she will be alright in the company of Daryl. When a small herd of walkers approached the survivors, Yumiko defended herself from the undead with the use of her bow until she was aided by a group of people called as the Highwaymen, who revealed themselves to be allies of the Kingdom and escorted the delegation directly to the fair. Once arrived at the community, Magna was in charge of lowering of the vehicle carrying the supplies that they had to offer as an exchange at the fair.

In "The Calm Before", while enjoying the fair, Yumiko and her group watched the arrival of Daryl and his group to the community. Fearing that the Whisperers will retaliate against the Hilltop for having taken Lydia from them, Magna offered to travel to her home to defend the community from any attack and during the road she ran into one of the carts belonging to Hilltop completely destroyed after an unfortunate encounter with the Whisperers. With Yumiko's decision to accompany Daryl and others to find the missing people, Magna chose to follow the initial plan and said goodbye to her girlfriend. At night, Yumiko and the group gets attacked by walkers. They take them out one by one until the Whisperers surround them. Beta emerges from the trees and tells them to drop their weapons. After the group is tied up, Alpha approaches them and tells them she ran into trouble on the road as she wipes her bloody knife on her pants. Michonne warns her if she tries to get Lydia back they'll respond in force, but Alpha assures her Lydia isn't her concern anymore. She takes out a shotgun and orders Daryl to follow her. At dawn, Daryl returns to the group and they leave back to the Kingdom. On their way back to the Kingdom, they find a beaten and bloody Siddiq tied to a tree. He points them to a nearby hill, which has ten pikes in the ground. Each spike has a severed head stabbed through the top. The group walk devastated towards it and look in horror at the victims: Ozzy, Alek, D.J., Frankie, Tammy, Rodney, Addy, Enid, Tara, and Henry. Yumiko is horrified and falls to her knees. They then put down their friends and loved ones and head back to the Kingdom. Later that day, Yumiko listens from the crowd as Siddiq delivers the tragic news, tells them how brave everyone was in their final moments and how he was intentionally kept alive to tell this very story. He encourages everyone to remember the fallen as brave heroes and to honor them.

In "The Storm", a few months after the massacre at the fair that marked the Whisperers' territory, a strong blizzard alerted the inhabitants of the Kingdom to leave their community due to the condition of the Kingdom was unable to live. With the help from Alexandria and the Hilltop, they escorted the Kingdommers safely to the Hilltop. Along the way, when the storm began to affect the survivors more, Yumiko and her group were forced to spend the night inside the abandoned Sanctuary and heard Michonne's plan to cross the frozen lake that belonged to Alpha's territory. Despite the fear to cross the border, the group succeeded in carrying out the plan successfully and arrived safely to the Hilltop.

==== Season 10 ====
In "Lines We Cross", Yumiko became a member of the militia that would face the Whisperers. But after the harsh winter, the Whisperers had mysteriously disappeared from the area. She attended the training carried out on the coast in case they would face them in the future. When a walker mask was found, Yumiko accompanied Michonne and others to investigate the surroundings in search of any sign that Alpha and the Whisperers had returned and eventually their fears came true when they found a walker's skin a few meters from a camp that was totally destroyed. When a satellite crashed to the Whisperers' territory causing a forest fire, Yumiko and her group had no choice but to cross the border that divided them from the Whisperers.

In "Silence the Whisperers", after being alerted to the mysterious fall of a tree against the walls of the Hilltop, Yumiko helped transport the injured from the fallen tree to the rooms of the mansion due to the lack of capacity of the infirmary. When the noise caught the attention of several herds of walkers, Magna and few residents of community were repelling the walkers and reluctantly was forced by Yumiko to fall back after the situation became critical; the Hilltop eventually received the help of Michonne and her group and together they stopped the invasion. Angry at the new role of her girlfriend occupied within the community, Magna confronted her about the fact that she was making decisions for others and reminded her that she is no longer her lawyer.

In "What It Always Is", Yumiko checks around the community to make sure everyone is helping with their chores. She is informed by Alden that Eugene has come up with a plan to salvage the fallen tree and use it to fix the wall. He also suggests to her that they should build up their defenses, but she says is not the time as Earl complains about their lack of retaliation against the Whisperers. Suddenly, Brianna tells Yumiko that someone stole the crate of fish from Oceanside during the night. Upon finding out it happened during Magna's shift, Magna was confronted by Yumiko for what she had done. During the conversation, she confessed to her girlfriend that she was guilty of the crime that she thought was innocent and left the room to avoid more tension between them.

Subsequently, Magna is apparently killed when Carol's reckless efforts to destroy Alpha's horde causes a cave-in that traps Connie and Magna. During the destruction of the Hilltop, Yumiko spots her girlfriend amongst the horde, but quickly realizes that Magna had covered herself in walker guts in order to walk with the horde and escape. A traumatized Magna admits that she got separated from Connie and doesn't know if she survived. Although Magna reconciles with Yumiko from their previous fight, she permanently ends their romantic relationship.

When Eugene announces his intention to head off to meet his contact Stephanie, Magna encourages Yumiko to go with him to find a new adventure and life. Accompanied by Ezekiel who is dying of thyroid cancer, the three make the trek and are joined by Princess. However, at the meeting spot, they are all captured and interrogated by the Commonwealth Army.

==== Season 11 ====
Taken to the Commonwealth, the group undergoes a more rigorous interrogation and plots an escape. However, on their way out, Princess spots a picture of Yumiko on a notice board and Yumiko discovers that her brother Tomi, whom she hadn't spoken to in years even before the world ended, is living in the Commonwealth. As a result, Yumiko aborts the escape and demands expedited processing into the Commonwealth which is eventually granted. Yumiko is able to find Tomi working in a bakery and is reunited with her brother. Unlike the others, due to her past as a lawyer, Yumiko is spared from many of the issues of the Commonwealth's class system and fails to recognize the problems that exist within the community. While the others are forced to perform menial jobs such as clearing walkers from houses, Yumiko is given a job as a lawyer in the Commonwealth, eventually becoming the personal attorney of Governor Pamela Milton. Tomi, who is aware of the issues, purposefully hid his past as a thoracic surgeon to avoid getting dragged into the mess until Yumiko reveals his true profession, forcing her brother back to work as a doctor. However, Tomi is eventually allowed to treat Ezekiel's thyroid cancer, saving his life.

After the others move to the Commonwealth, Yumiko initially clashes with Magna over their differing views of life in the Commonwealth. However, Yumiko quickly realizes that her friends are right and joins with their efforts to expose the corruption of the Milton family, although she keeps working for Pamela so as not to blow her cover. As the situation worsens, Yumiko openly berates Pamela for having tear gas used on her friends and plans to help them escape if the situation calls for it. However, Yumiko herself intends to remain behind so as to protect Tomi from any fallout.

Following the death of Sebastian Milton, all of Yumiko's friends are rounded up and made to disappear, although Yumiko is spared that fate. Yumiko furiously confronts Pamela who blackmails Yumiko into acting as the prosecutor in Eugene's murder trial to give it the appearance of legitimacy. With Pamela threatening her brother and promising to lead Yumiko to her friends if she complies, Yumiko finds herself torn, especially after a failed attempt to follow the man who had tried to abduct Connie. Eugene is resigned to his possible fate and holds no ill will against Yumiko for possibly being forced to prosecute him, but he encourages Yumiko not to give up faith in their friends. After learning that Daryl and Carol had managed to escape, Yumiko turns her public announcement of prosecuting Eugene into a public announcement proclaiming that he is being unjustly persecuted and that Yumiko will be his defense attorney instead. During the announcement, Yumiko reminds the community of just how invaluable Tomi is to them, making it impossible for Pamela to simply disappear him in retaliation. Despite knowing that the trial is rigged, Yumiko uses it to reach out to the lower classes to further expose Pamela's corruption, even confronting Pamela on the stand about the things that Sebastian had revealed in the speech that Max Mercer had secretly recorded and played. Although Pamela tries to claim that Eugene had faked the tape, it is met with disbelief and calls for Eugene to be freed. Eugene is convicted and sentenced to death, but General Michael Mercer and some of his soldiers break Eugene out. While Eugene is in hiding, Mercer has Yumiko and Max continue sowing dissent amongst the population and helps Yumiko to cover up her knowledge of Eugene's whereabouts.

After the others are rescued from a forced labor camp, they return to the Commonwealth to take down Pamela. Yumiko, Eugene and Max are reunited with their friends with Luke and Jules joining them soon afterwards. However, the Commonwealth is overrun by a massive herd drawn in by Pamela as an excuse to force a lockdown. Yumiko joins the defense of the Commonwealth and is devastated by the loss of Luke. After Pamela is overthrown, Yumiko helps to destroy the herd and save the Commonwealth. Yumiko and Magna rekindle their romantic relationship and are still living together in the Commonwealth a year later.

== Development and reception ==
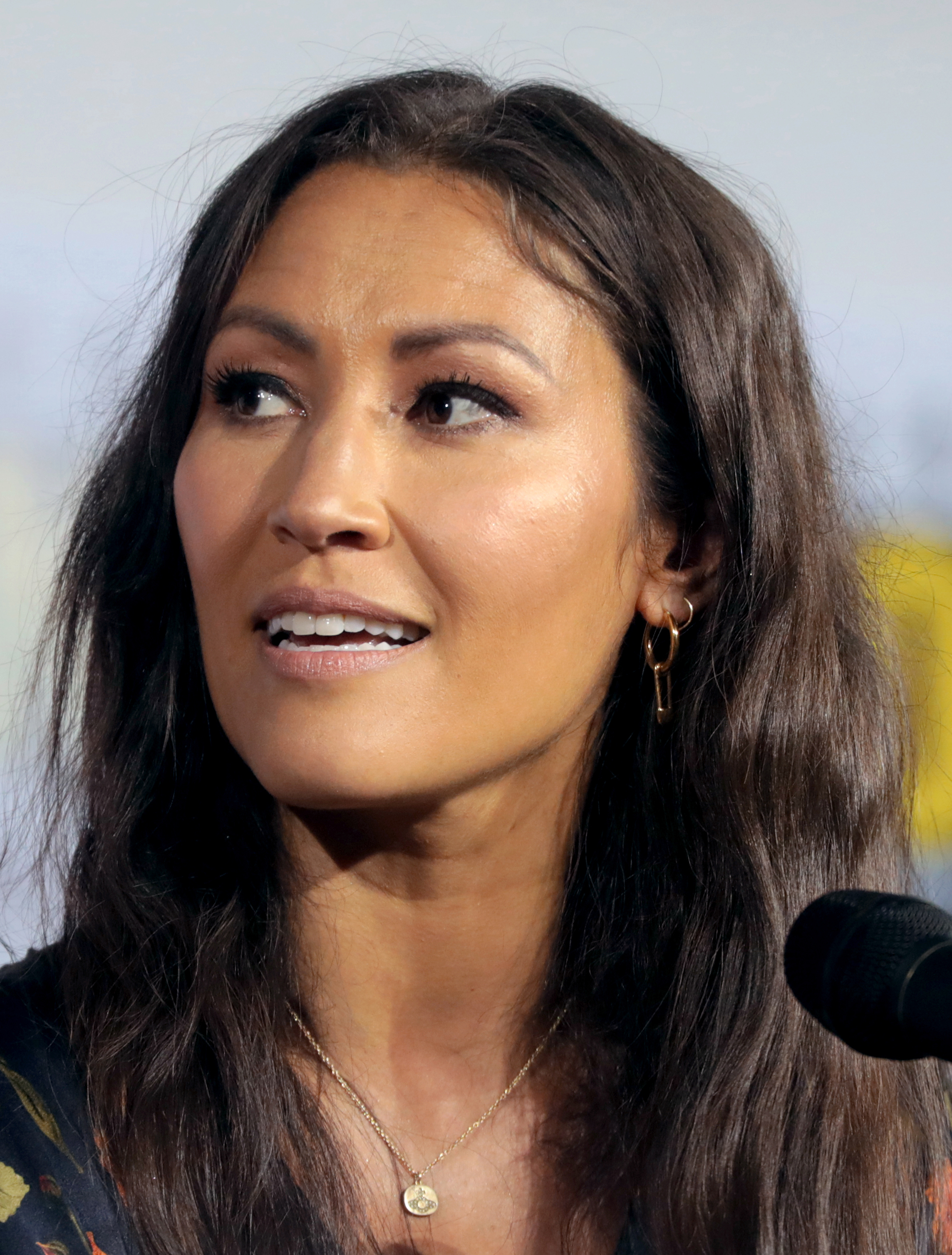
Eleanor Matsuura portrays Yumiko

Yumiko is portrayed by Eleanor Matsuura. The character entered the recurring cast beginning with the episode "What Comes After" of the ninth season. However, Eleanor Matsuura was promoted to a series regular starting the tenth season.

During an interview with Cynthia Vinney writing for CBR Eleanor Matsuura revealed that she was excited to join the show and said: "Oh my gosh, it was crazy and a real honor to join such an established show, a huge family that's been just like slaying it for nine years. I mean the fact that we're on our tenth season now is just an incredible achievement. I feel so proud to be a part of it."

Ryan DeVault of Monsters and Critics praised the work of Eleanor Matsuura and wrote: "Matsuura's character of Yumiko is already making an important impact on The Walking Dead cast. Though she has only been in a handful of episodes, there is a lot of foreshadowing that suggests she will have an important part in the coming conflict with the Whisperers."

During an interview with Emily Hannemann writing for TV Insider Eleanor Matsuura revealed the interest of Yumiko's character development and said: "Yes, it was! I had a conversation with Angela at the beginning of the season where she told me about where she sees Yumiko going and what's going to unfold in the season. One of the things that was mentioned was that Hilltop is going through this huge change with the attacks happening and losing Tara last season, and Maggie is currently not around. I don't think it was ever pre-planned, that Yumiko's like, 'I'm going to be the leader!' It's just an opportunity that presented itself when we were under attack from the Whisperers. I have this line, 'When the s**t hits the fan, someone has to step up.' And I think when that happened, when the tree falls through and the walkers overwhelm us, Yumiko naturally steps into that role because she can and because she’s good at it. It was never something where Angela was like, 'Yumiko's going to become the next leader of Hilltop.' But it was definitely an opportunity to show that Yumiko's incredibly capable and she's so passionate about her new community that she will fight for it."
