= Stradivarius (The Walking Dead) =

- The Walking Dead episode
- Episode no.: Season 9 Episode 7
- Directed by: Michael Cudlitz
- Written by: Vivian Tse
- Cinematography by: Duane Manwiller
- Editing by: Alan Cody
- Original air date: November 18, 2018
- Running time: 44 minutes

Guest appearances
- Eleanor Matsuura as Yumiko; Dan Fogler as Luke; Nadia Hilker as Magna; Lauren Ridloff as Connie; Matt Lintz as Henry; Kerry Cahill as Dianne; C. Thomas Howell as Roy; Angel Theory as Kelly; Matt Magnum as DJ

Episode chronology
← Previous "Who Are You Now?"	Next → "Evolution"
- The Walking Dead season 9

"Stradivarius" is the seventh episode of the ninth season of the post-apocalyptic horror television series The Walking Dead, which aired on AMC on November 18, 2018.

== Plot ==
At the Hilltop, Tara goes over the day's activities with Jesus, revealing that Maggie decided to leave with her child Hershel and joined Georgie's group, leaving Jesus in charge of Hilltop. They further discuss the situation between the Hilltop and Alexandria, the two communities having refused to work together due to past events. Later, Jesus sneaks out of Hilltop and meets with Aaron, where they practice close-quarters combat and discuss in private how they can help restore the trust between their two communities. Suddenly, they see a flare go off nearby, and find a wounded Rosita needing their help. They race her back to the Hilltop for medical attention.

Michonne, with Siddiq and DJ, take Magna's group back to their former camp, finding the shipping container they used for shelter had been upended, seemingly by a large herd. Luke, a former music teacher, recovers a supply of musical instruments he has collected and had stashed there. Michonne states that this will be as far as she goes and prepares to return to Alexandria, but Magna convinces her she needs to stay with them to argue their case to Maggie. They find shelter for the evening in an abandoned building.

Daryl leads Carol and Henry to his camp, and introduces them to his dog, named Dog. Carol fears for Daryl's health as he has not eaten much, but Daryl has become accustomed to that, and in his course of searching for Rick Grimes' body, has gotten used to living on his own. That night, as Daryl takes Dog to check his traps, they are followed by Henry. Dog gets stuck in one of the traps, and while Daryl frees it, they are overwhelmed by walkers. Henry steps in to help kill them. When they return to camp, Henry explains that he's learned that it is better to look at the big picture of everyone's survival than just one person.

During the night, Luke scavenges from junk in the abandoned building, alerting Michonne, and when he emerges with an object, she slashes it in two. He reveals that the object was a rare Stradivarius violin, one he had found earlier in their group's travels and states that he believes that by bringing art and music back, they will be able to overcome the walkers. They prepare to set out the next morning, and Michonne again states her intention to return to Alexandria, but Siddiq reveals that Maggie has long departed there. Before they can discuss further plans, they realize a walker horde has surrounded the building. The group efficiently dispatches the walkers until they see one they recognize as Bernie, a former member of Magna's group. Michonne executes Bernie with some degree of respect before they set out.

As they near Hilltop, two riders from the Hilltop come by, on their way to Alexandria to inform them about Rosita, but since they are here, the group, including Michonne, prepare to continue to Hilltop. Connie thinks she sees something in the woods, but later says it was nothing. However, unseen by the convoy, someone is spying on them as they depart. They reach Hilltop, where they reconvene with Daryl's group. Daryl learns of Rosita's injury, and that Eugene is still missing. Aaron, Daryl, and Jesus head out in search of Eugene.

== Production ==
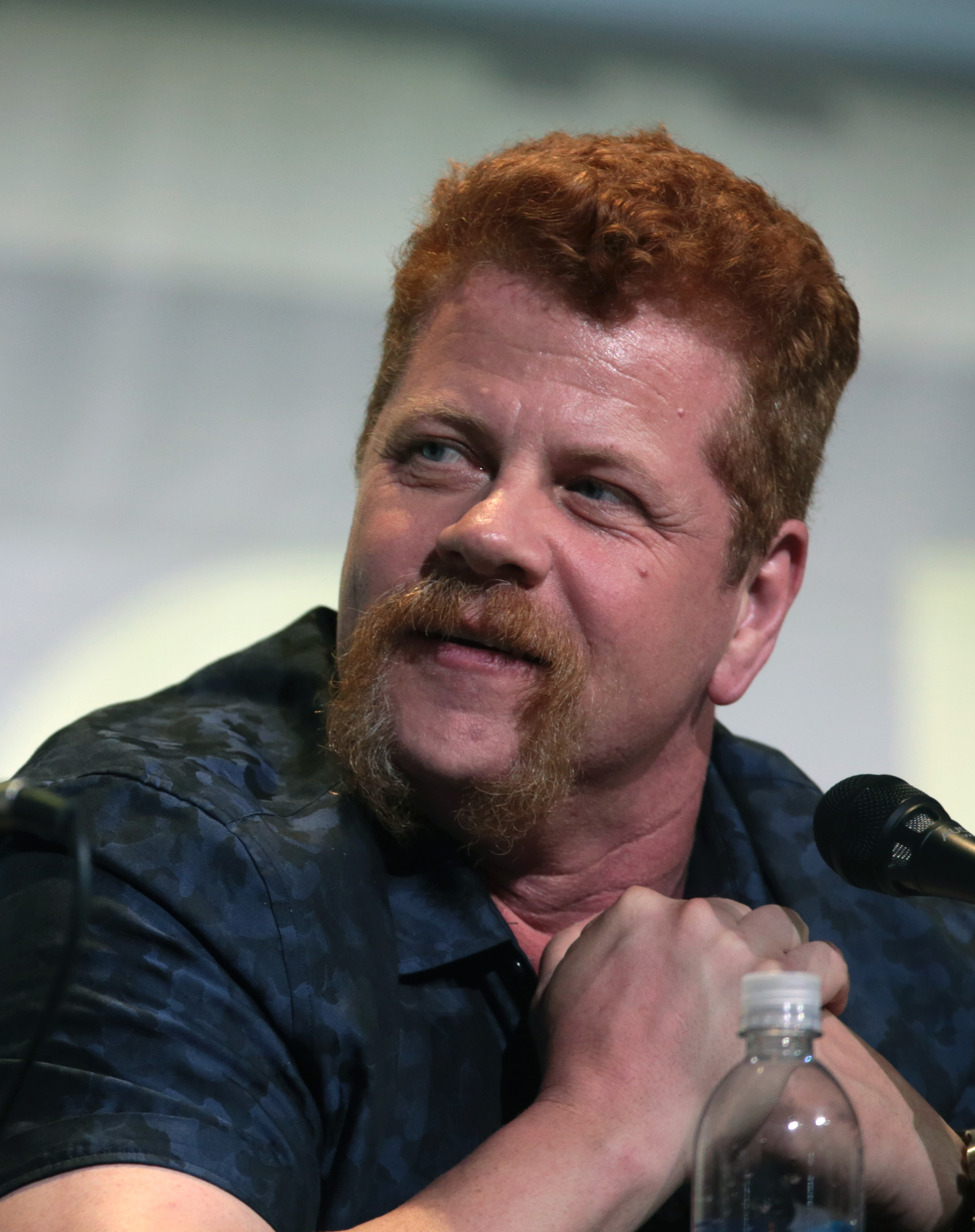
The episode was directed by former cast member Michael Cudlitz

"Stradivarius" is the directorial debut of Michael Cudlitz, who had played Abraham Ford from seasons 4 through 7 on the show. Cudlitz said that, after his casting, he had spoken to Scott Gimple about the potential to direct episodes in the future. Cudlitz had been in line to direct episodes of Southland, a previous series he had starred in before The Walking Dead, but the show was cancelled before he could get his chance. Cudlitz and Gimple discussed this possibility during his time on the show, and Cudlitz made mention of this again after his departure. Once the new showrunner Angela Kang took over for Gimple, Gimple put her in touch with Cudlitz to explore the opportunity to direct.

Knowing that Kang was giving the show a more Western feel, Cudlitz took inspiration from films like The Searchers and Shane for how to frame some of the scenes. A significant part of the episode was developing Daryl's backstory and why he had separated from the groups, as well as how he would be re-integrated. Norman Reedus, the actor that plays Daryl, scriptwriter Vivian Tse, and Cudlitz had various ideas of how these elements should play out, and the three worked to create a cohesive story that will be developed upon. Cudlitz was also responsible in this episode of making sure that an X-shaped scar on Daryl was featured, mimicking one seen on Michonne's back in the previous episode. Cudlitz did not fully explain the significance of the marks but indicated they were tied to the breakdown of the relationship between Michonne, Maggie, and Daryl during the time jump.

The episode features a cameo appearance from C. Thomas Howell, who took the role after being asked by Cudlitz, as they "needed someone who could ride a horse and act." Cudlitz and Howell are friends and they previously worked together on Southland.

== Reception ==
=== Critical reception ===
"Stradivarius" received generally positive reviews from critics. On Rotten Tomatoes, the episode has an approval rating of 79% with an average score of 6.03 out of 10, based on 16 reviews. The critical consensus reads: "Stradivarius" efficiently sets the board for promising developments and provides a welcome spotlight for Daryl Dixon, but some viewers may feel The Walking Dead is sacrificing organic narrative development and stalling for time with contrivances.

=== Ratings ===
"Stradivarius" received a total viewership of 4.79 million with a 1.8 rating in adults aged 18–49. It was the highest-rated cable program of the night, however, the episode dropped in viewership from the previous week.
