= Magna (The Walking Dead) =

- The Walking Dead character
- Magna, as portrayed by Nadia Hilker in the television series (left) and in the comic book series (right).
- First appearance: Comic: "Issue #127" (2014); Television: "What Comes After" (2018)
- Last appearance: Comic: "Issue #193" (2019); Television: "Rest in Peace" (2022)
- Created by: Robert Kirkman; Charlie Adlard
- Adapted by: Angela Kang (The Walking Dead)
- Portrayed by: Nadia Hilker

In-universe information
- Occupation: Comic: Former Leader of Slade County Retirement Home; Co-Leader of the Militia; Former Deputy Leader of the Alexandria Safe-Zone; De Facto Leader of the Alexandria Safe-Zone; Television: Truck Stop Waitress; Guard for the Hilltop Colony
- Spouses: Television: Yumiko (wife)
- Significant others: Comic: Yumiko (girlfriend)

Magna is a fictional character in the comic book series The Walking Dead and the television series of the same name, where she is portrayed by Nadia Hilker. In both universes, Magna is the feisty leader of a small group of roaming survivors and, as in the comic books, she is an LGBT character.

== Appearances ==
=== Comic book series ===
Magna is the leader of the survivors from Richmond who joins the Alexandria Safe-Zone two years after the fall of Negan and the Saviors. At the beginning of the zombie apocalypse, Magna is one of many survivors who arrive at a nursing home near Washington D.C. As they moved through the east side of Washington, a massive herd of walkers that was being routed by Paul "Jesus" Monroe and other residents of Alexandria took Magna's group by surprise, causing them to lose their trailer and other belongings, as well as one of its members.

After being rescued and taken to Alexandria, Magna and her group were interviewed by Rick Grimes and Andrea in order to allow them to stay, and although at first they felt comfortable with the community they soon began to distrust the idyllic life they led. When Rick is absent in Alexandria, Magna and her group discover a prison. They find Negan, who tells them that Rick and his people are animals that torture him and begs them to release him, but she refused as she knew that Negan was lying.

During the war against the Whisperers, Magna was a very important member of the militia, helping them win the war against the Whisperers. After Rick's death, Magna and her girlfriend Yumiko live together in Alexandria after the community joins the Commonwealth.

=== Television series ===
==== Season 9 ====
Magna appears for the first time in "What Comes After" while escaping from a herd of walkers. Magna, like the rest of her group, defends herself from the walkers while trying to escape, although they end up being surrounded by them and subsequently rescued by an unknown person. Making their way through the wood, Magna and her group go into the forest and discover that their rescuer is a little girl named Judith Grimes.

In "Who Are You Now?", after meeting the rest of Judith's group and being taken to her community, the arrival of Magna and her group is not well received by Michonne, who reminds Aaron that he does not have the right to allow other groups to enter Alexandria. Eventually, Aaron reluctantly agrees that the fate of the newcomers in the community will be decided by the council. Inside Gabriel's church, Magna and his group are questioned about their profession before the outbreak began and the things they did to survive; and despite making good impressions to the council members, the story told by Magna arouses Michonne's suspicions. Ultimately, the council decides to allow them to spend the night in Alexandria, but declares that they must leave the next day. Her fellow group members force her to hand over the other knife she had in store and strongly oppose her plan to steal Alexandria's supplies before leaving. Without giving up on her plan, Magna decides to break into Michonne's house to attack her, but after seeing Michonne embrace her son, she stops at the last moment and gives her the other knife that she had kept, confessing that she would have taken the same precautions that Michonne took with her group if she were the community leader. Magna's words eventually convince Michonne not to send them back in the open, and she escorts them to another community.

In "Stradivarius", on their way to the Hilltop, Magna protests Michonne's decision not to hand over their weapons after having repeatedly shown her that they are no danger to anyone, but her group ignores her. Michonne tells her that they will take the weapons they found, which leads to an argument between her and Magna. However, Magna ultimately accepts Michonne's decision, and she sets off to find a safe place for the night. The next day, after realizing that several walkers are approaching their location, Magna demands that Michonne give them their weapons to be able to defend themselves from the walkers. While they make their way to the cart connected to the horses to escape the undead, Magna comes face to face with the zombified Bernie and is unable to put her friend out of his misery, forcing Michonne to destroy him. Back on the road, Magna is completely shattered after witnessing her friend turned into a walker, and is comforted by Michonne, who confesses that she understands the pain of losing someone she considers part of her family.

In "Evolution", after arriving to the Hilltop and reluctantly surrendering their weapons to enter, the fate of Magna and her group within the walls is put on hold by Tara Chambler, who informs the new arrivals that they can stay in the community while waiting for Paul "Jesus" Monroe's arrival to make a final decision regarding if they could stay in the community. Despite the hospitality of her new home, Magna maintains her suspicions regarding the leader of the community, but accepts her partner's proposal to work hard on what the community will need to gain her place. With the news that Eugene Porter has been hidden from a herd of walkers by Rosita Espinosa, Magna, along with Yumiko, decides to go to search for him and arrives just in time to help Michonne rescue Jesus, Aaron and Eugene from walkers in an abandoned cemetery. When Jesus confronts the rest of the remaining walkers and prepares to return to the group to escape the walkers, Magna and the others watch in horror as he is stabbed in the heart by a walker. She helps to retaliate against the armed walkers that are attacking them. After discovering that they are in fact living people wearing walker skin, Magna and her group end up being surrounded by group of "walkers", who whispers that they are going to die.

In "Adaptation", Magna, along with her group, fights the group that is attacking them and before leaving, she helps take Jesus' body with them. As they set off to return to the Hilltop, Magna comforts Aaron over the loss, ensuring that he looked like a good person. They later spot a small herd of walkers on the bridge. After they kill most of the "walkers", the group is forced to take with them the only survivor of the skirmish in order to interrogate her about her group. After arriving at Hilltop carrying the bad news of what happened in their mission, Magna helps lower Jesus' body from one of the horses that transported him to be buried. Later, after being informed that Luke and Alden had gone out to look for them, Magna decides to accompany Enid in one of the guard posts waiting for the arrival of both of them and assures her that her boyfriend is in good hands.

In "Omega", after discovering in the wood the horses that belonged to Luke and Alden who are missing, Magna, like the rest of her team, decides to keep looking, and is interrupted by Tara, who decides that it will be better to return to Hilltop for their own safety. Later, when Yumiko proposes to look for Luke on her own despite Tara's orders, Magna reluctantly accepts their demands; subsequently, they leaves the place in the middle of the night. Daunted by the large number of walkers, Magna and her group reluctantly leave the search behind and return to the Hilltop, only to witness the arrival of Alpha and her group at the gates of the community, demanding that they turn over her daughter, Lydia.

In "Bounty", Magna oversees an exchange of Lydia for Luke, whom Alpha had taken prisoner. She receives Luke at the entrance and subsequently decides to celebrate their reunion by drinking during the night.

In "Chokepoint", Magna is part of a team that escorts the residents of the community to the fair. After noticing Kelly's concern about her sister's whereabouts, Magna assures her that she will be safe in the company of Daryl Dixon. When a small herd of walkers approached the survivors, Magna defends herself from the undead with the use of her bow until she is aided by a group of people called as the Highwaymen, who reveal themselves to be allies of the Kingdom; she then escorts the delegation directly to the fair. Once they arrive at the community, Magna is in charge of lowering the vehicle carrying the supplies that they have to offer as an exchange at the fair.

In "The Calm Before", while enjoying the fair, Magna and her group watch the arrival of Daryl and his group to the community. Fearing that the Whisperers will retaliate against the Hilltop for having taken Lydia from them, Magna offers to travel to her home to defend the community from any attack and during the road she runs into one of the carts belonging to Hilltop completely destroyed after an encounter with the Whisperers. With Yumiko's decision to accompany Daryl and others to find the missing people, Magna chooses to follow the initial plan and says goodbye to her girlfriend. After being informed that Alpha murdered several members of the community, Magna is among the people who listen to Siddiq's story about the courage the victims.

In "The Storm", a few months after the massacre at the fair, a blizzard alerts the inhabitants of the Kingdom to leave their community. With the help from Alexandria and Hilltop, they escort the Kingdom residents safely to Hilltop. Along the way, when the storm begins affecting the survivors, Magna and her group are forced to spend the night inside the abandoned Sanctuary and hears Michonne's plan to cross the frozen lake that is part of Alpha's territory. The group carries out the plan and arrives safely at the Hilltop.

==== Season 10 ====
In "Lines We Cross", Magna has become a member of the militia that will face the Whisperers. Following the harsh winter, the Whisperers have mysteriously disappeared from the area. Magna attends the training carried out on the coast in case they face them in the future. When a walker mask is found, Magna accompanies Michonne and others to investigate the surroundings in search of any sign that Alpha and the Whisperers have returned; eventually, their fears come true when they find a walker's skin a few meters from a camp that was totally destroyed. When a satellite crashes into the Whisperers' territory, causing a forest fire, Magna and her group have no choice but to cross the border that separates them from the Whisperers.

In "Silence the Whisperers", after being alerted to the mysterious fall of a tree against the walls of the Hilltop, Magna helps transport the injured from the fallen tree to the rooms of the mansion due to the lack of capacity of the infirmary. When the noise draws the attention of several herds of walkers, Magna and few residents of community repel them, but is forced by Yumiko to fall back after the situation becomes critical; the Hilltop eventually receives the help of Michonne and her group and together they stop the invasion. Angry that the new role of her girlfriend occupies within the community, Magna confronts her about the fact that she is making decisions for others and reminds her that she is no longer her lawyer.

In "What It Always Is", assuming that more attacks will come to the Hilltop, Magna along with Kelly decides to steal the community's supplies and hide them in a remote area of the forest in order to have resources for her group in case the community falls. When Kelly does not return to Hilltop with the hunting team, Magna joins Daryl and Connie in search of her. After finding her lying under the tree, she is forced by Kelly to reveal the place where they had hidden the supplies that they had stolen Hilltop's pantry supplies and thus confirm their guilt. Her actions are criticized by Daryl and Connie, who instead of condemning them decided to hide the truth by changing it to a version that would protect their stay inside the walls. After returning to the Hilltop, Magna is confronted by Yumiko for what she had done. During the conversation, she confesses to her girlfriend that she is guilty of the crime and leaves the room to avoid more tension between them.

In "The World Before", when Gamma reveals the location of the herd of walkers that Alpha had, Magna joins a small team to destroy the herd, but finds the place completely empty. Assuming an act of treason by their informant, Magna and the rest of her team decides to change their plans and undertake the search for Lydia after having disappeared without any trace; but she is forced to chase after Carol after she glimpses Alpha in the distance. The group ends up falling into her trap inside a dark cave full of walkers.

In "Squeeze," the group desperately tries to find a way out. However, due to Carol's reckless actions to destroy the horde with unstable dynamite, the cave partially collapses, trapping Magna and Connie who are feared to be dead and creating a rift between Daryl and Carol.

In "Walk with Us," Magna reappears as part of the herd during the destruction of the Hilltop. At first, Yumiko believes that her girlfriend has died and turned, before realizing that Magna has covered herself in walker guts, allowing Magna to walk undetected with the herd. A traumatized Magna reveals that, after the cave collapse, she and Connie had managed to escape in the herd using walker guts, but she got separated from Connie and doesn't know if her friend survived or not. Magna makes amends with Yumiko from their previous fight, but decides to end their romantic relationship for good.

In "Look at the Flowers," Magna encourages Yumiko to join Eugene's mission to meet Stephanie and to find a new adventure.

In "A Certain Doom," Magna joins the group that covers themselves in walker guts to pass through the Whisperers' horde and lead it away from the Tower, acting as an archer protecting the wagon carrying the makeshift sound system. After the sound system is destroyed, Magna and the others infiltrate the herd once again and assassinate the Whisperers one by one, allowing Carol and Lydia to lead the herd to its destruction.

==== Season 11 ====
Now residing in a badly damaged Alexandria, Magna takes part in the efforts to rebuild the community and deal with the food issues. Magna also discourages Carol's searches for the still-missing Connie with Kelly, but joins her friends after they get a lead from a surviving Whisperer. The group finally finds Connie and saves her from cannibalistic survivors. When Alexandria faces simultaneous danger from a storm and a herd, Magna helps to close the breaches in the walls and put out the fire that is drawing the walkers.

After contact is made with the Commonwealth, Magna is one of the people that moves there and gets a job as a waiter unlike Yumiko who gets a rather lofty position as a lawyer. Magna clashes with Yumiko somewhat, pointing out the unfair class system that exists in the Commonwealth. While the two don't resume their romantic relationship, they remain close friends and Yumiko promises to help get Magna out if things go bad, although Yumiko plans to stay herself as Yumiko's long-lost brother Tomi resides in the Commonwealth and she needs to protect him. Magna is abducted along with the rest of the Coalition survivors and sent to a forced labor camp, but she is freed. Upon returning to the Commonwealth to fight Governor Pamela Milton, Magna is reunited with Yumiko who was spared everyone else's fate. However, shortly after being reunited with Luke for the first time in months, the Commonwealth is overrun by a massive horde and Luke is bitten. Despite the efforts of his closest friends to save him, Luke dies, devastating them and forcing Magna to stab him in the head to keep him from turning.

After the horde is destroyed and Pamela overthrown, Magna and Yumiko resume their romantic relationship and are still living together in the Commonwealth a year later.

== Development and reception ==
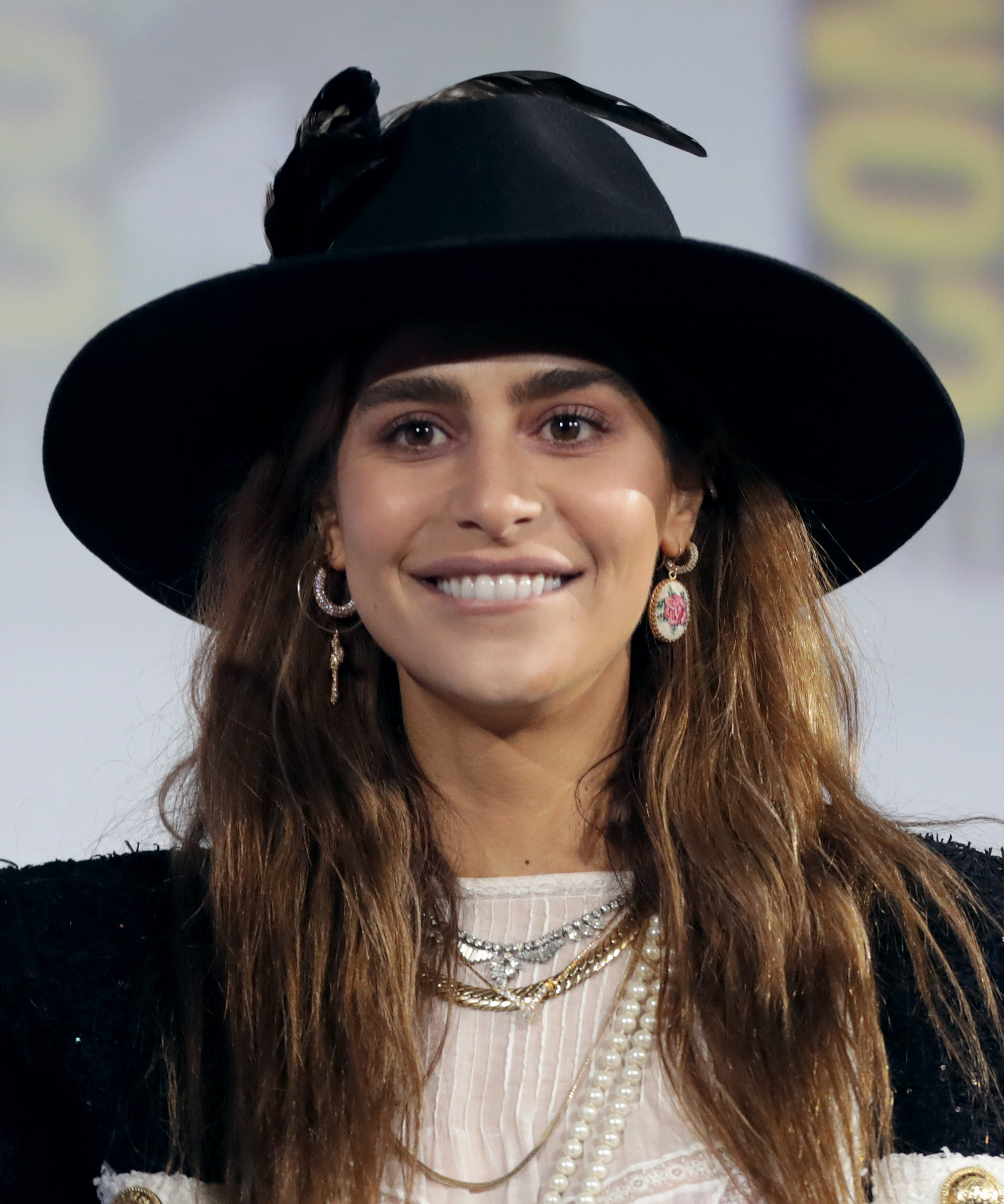
Nadia Hilker portrays Magna

Magna is portrayed by Nadia Hilker. The character entered the recurring cast beginning with the episode "What Comes After" of the ninth season. However, Nadia Hilker was promoted to a series regular starting the tenth season.

Alex McLevy writing for The A.V. Club in the episode "Silence the Whisperers" praised the development of Magna's character: "Magna remains the most memorable, simply because Nadia Hilker is a magnetic actor, but even she is stuck doing little but sniping at Yumiko for making decisions Magna doesn't agree with, as though that's a huge problem when it involves saving their asses."

During an interview with Jon Maus writing for Fanfest News Nadia Hilker said that it felt great to work for Robert Kirkman, and remarked: "I still haven't realized how big it is yet. But, when I do, it's great. I'm so grateful. It's a family. We're all having each other's backs, and it's super brutal to shoot. Like, shooting the show itself is brutal, but it's so much fun. It feels like summer camp, and everybody is too good to be true."

Ryan DeVault of Monsters and Critics praised Hilker's work, writing: "Nadia Hilker is best-known for her recurring character of Luna on The 100. She is a German-born actress who has also appeared in the films Allegiant and Collide. Soon, Hilker is going to be best-known for her portrayal of Magna."

John Saavedra, writing for Den of Geek!, expressed praise to Hilker for the character of Magna and said: "Magna is one of the new characters who was brought in to freshen up the show in season 9. With Danai Gurira set to exit this season, Nadia Hilker might be ready to shine as The Walking Dead's new badass with a blade."
