= What It Always Is =

- The Walking Dead episode
- Episode no.: Season 10; Episode 5
- Directed by: Laura Belsey
- Written by: Eli Jorné
- Cinematography by: Duane Charles Manwiller
- Editing by: Alan Cody
- Original air date: November 3, 2019
- Running time: 46 minutes

Guest appearances
- Thora Birch as Gamma / Mary; John Finn as Earl Sutton; Angel Theory as Kelly; Blaine Kern III as Brandon; Anthony Lopez as Oscar; Austin Freeman as Alex; Camille Robinson as Brianna; Virginia Newcomb as Amelia; Roman Spink as Milo; Ross Crain as Whisperer

Episode chronology
← Previous "Silence the Whisperers"	Next → "Bonds"
- The Walking Dead season 10

"What It Always Is" is the fifth episode of the tenth season of the post-apocalyptic horror television series The Walking Dead, which aired on AMC on November 3, 2019.

== Plot ==
Free from his cell, Negan gets some distance from Alexandria and finds he is being followed by Brandon, the son of a former Savior also living in Alexandria. Brandon expresses his admiration for the way Negan used to be when he ran the Saviors; he gives Negan a new bat and returns his old leather jacket, both of which Negan refuses to accept.

Yumiko receives reports that supplies have been missing. Hilltop soldier Oscar informs Kelly's deaf and mute sister Connie that Kelly, with slight hearing loss, has gotten separated from the hunting party. Daryl and Connie go to search for her but are also being followed by Magna. They eventually find Kelly near a stash of supplies that she and Magna have been taking from the Hilltop, as they do not yet fully trust the community.

Elsewhere, Aaron, while on patrol, spots Gamma leading a walker to the river water so that its blood poisons the waters. Gamma senses someone nearby, but does not spot Aaron. She then reports back to Alpha, who tells her to be wary. Later, as Gamma leads another walker to blood-let, conflicted in where her morals lie, she cuts her hand. Aaron, who saw her, gives her a bandage; she takes it and runs off. When Gamma shows this to Alpha, she considers that Aaron may be interested in Gamma; she takes off Gamma's walker mask, suggesting she may need to use another to keep him interested.

Meanwhile, Siddiq discovers that Ezekiel has thyroid cancer and does not know how long he'll live. Though Ezekiel's grandmother and father fought off the same illness, Ezekiel is convinced that his condition is terminal in the current world which lacks modern medicine. Siddiq contacts Alexandria as he plans to return that night, but arranges for Carol to come talk to Ezekiel. However, just as Carol is about to come on, Ezekiel turns off the radio. Meanwhile Yumiko confronts Magna about the stolen supplies, as she was the one guarding the inventory; Magna denies it.

After Negan and Brandon rescue a mother and son trapped aboard a bus, and growing increasingly irritated with Brandon's pestering and idolization of the Saviors' way of life, Negan tells him to leave. After Brandon storms off, Negan is soon drawn to the son and promises that he will lead them in the right direction to the Hilltop where he and his mother can live peacefully. When Negan returns from collecting firewood, he finds that Brandon has killed the two, thinking this was a test to become Negan's protégé. Enraged by the senseless murder, Negan takes a stone and beats Brandon to death, then recovers the bat and his jacket, and continues on.

That night at the Hilltop, Daryl talks to Connie, having agreed not to inform the rest of the community and instead saying that they simply found the supplies, and tells her he understands the bond of family. Out in the woods, Negan purposely crosses into Whisperer territory, shouting and baiting walkers to come toward him. As he starts killing a group of them, however, he is caught and thrown to the ground by Beta.

== Reception ==
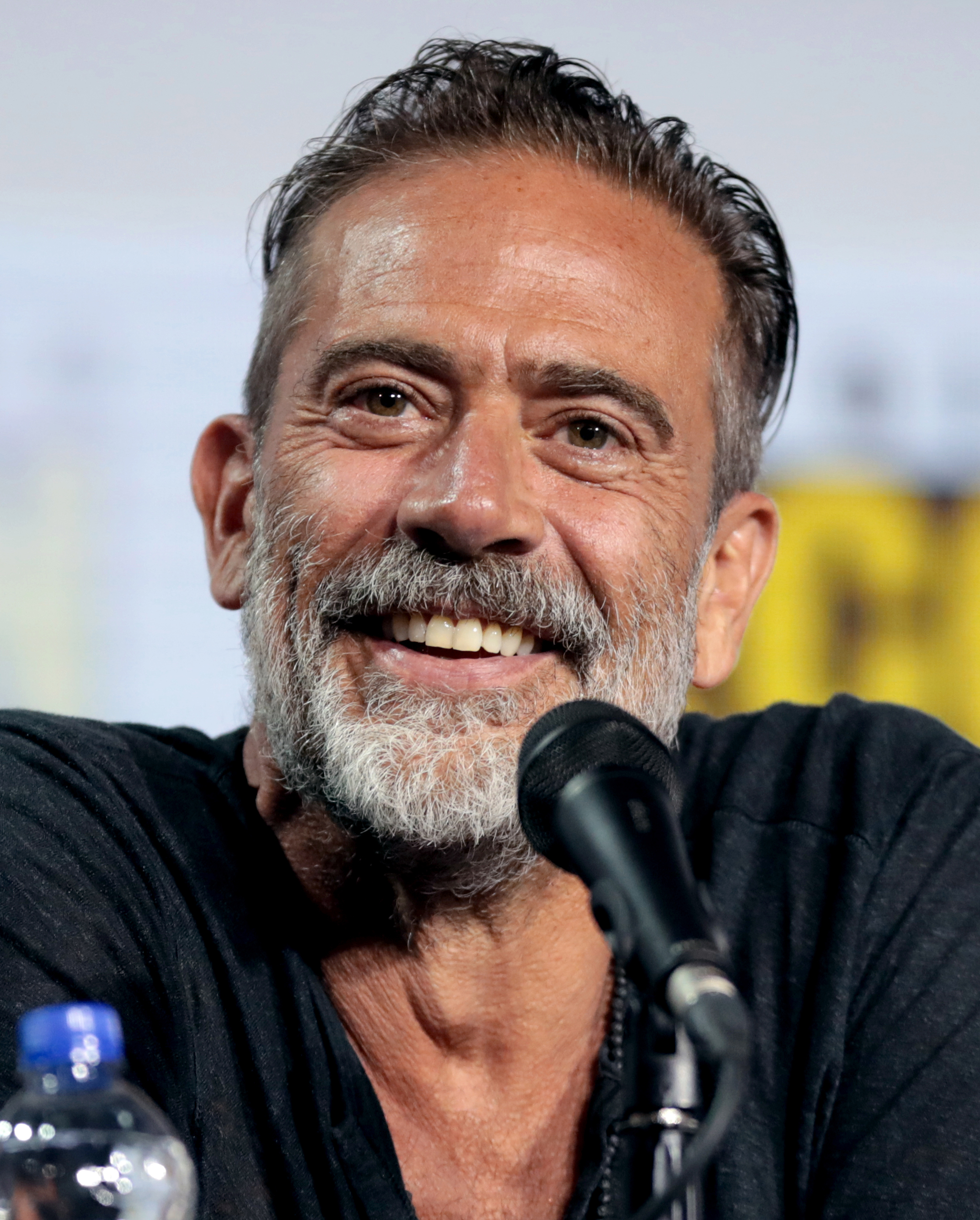
Jeffrey Dean Morgan received praise for his performance as Negan.

=== Critical reception ===
"What It Always Is" received positive reviews from critics, with praise going towards Jeffrey Dean Morgan's performance. On Rotten Tomatoes, the episode has an approval rating of 89% with an average score of 6.80 out of 10, based on 19 reviews. The site's critical consensus reads: "While packed with several gripping plot threads, a rewarding showcase of Negan is what truly makes 'What It Always Is' a stand out episode of the season."

=== Ratings ===
"What It Always Is" received a total viewership of 3.09 million. It was the highest-rated cable program of the night; however, it decreased in viewership from the previous week and was a series low in viewers.
