= Silence the Whisperers =

- The Walking Dead episode
- Episode no.: Season 10; Episode 4
- Directed by: Michael Cudlitz
- Written by: Geraldine Inoa
- Cinematography by: Duane Charles Manwiller
- Editing by: Tiffany Melvin
- Original air date: October 27, 2019
- Running time: 45 minutes

Guest appearances
- Dan Fogler as Luke; John Finn as Earl Sutton; Kenric Green as Scott; Juan Javier Cardenas as Dante; Angel Theory as Kelly; Lindsley Register as Laura; Kerry Cahill as Dianne; Nadine Marissa as Nabila; Blaine Kern III as Brandon; Gustavo Gomez as Marco; Antony Azor as R.J. Grimes; Jackson Pace as Gage; Tamara Austin as Nora; Jerri Tubbs as Margo; David Shae as Alfred; Austin Freeman as Alex

Episode chronology
← Previous "Ghosts"	Next → "What It Always Is"
- The Walking Dead season 10

"Silence the Whisperers" is the fourth episode of the tenth season of the post-apocalyptic horror television series The Walking Dead, which aired on AMC on October 27, 2019.

== Plot ==
At Hilltop, a tree falls across the fence line and onto a barn, trapping people inside while walkers start to invade via the gap. Hilltop's people rally to contain the breach until it can be fixed. Connie, Alden, and Earl suspect that Alpha and the Whisperers knocked over the tree, and Alexandria is alerted to the situation. Michonne leaves with Judith and a small group to help out.

Meanwhile at Alexandria, word spreads that the incident was believed to be caused by the Whisperers, Lydia finds herself being tormented and bullied by Gage, Alfred, and Margo, accusing her of the other Whisperers' deeds. Lydia runs off to hide, only to be found by Negan who helps to comfort her and suggest she retaliate against the bullies. Daryl catches Negan talking to Lydia, and warns him that he should stay away from her, as he and Michonne are worried that Negan's influence may cause Lydia to act irrationally; they need to protect Lydia as she is believed to be what is holding Alpha back from unleashing a full walker horde against them. Daryl finds "Silence the Whispers" written across his house sometime later.

En route to Hilltop, Michonne spots Ezekiel all alone, and has the group continue on while she talks to him. She finds Ezekiel has become suicidal, and helps to calm him down from the brink of jumping, and he thanks her with a kiss, before he tells her about his sorrow at having lost his Kingdom, Shiva, Benjamín, Henry, and Carol. The two rejoin the others, and head on to the Hilltop.

That night at Alexandria, Gage, Alfred, and Margo corner and attack Lydia. Negan arrives to try to break up the fight, inadvertently pulling Margo off too hard and cracking her skull in the process. When Daryl discovers this, Lydia asserts that Negan was helping her and didn't mean to hurt Margo. Daryl locks Negan in his cell and puts Negan's fate to a vote before the Alexandria council. Back at the Hilltop, Michonne's group arrives and helps with pushing back the invading walkers long enough for the fence to be braced, and then she talks to Daryl through the radio, and she tells him to keep Lydia safe as she might be the only leverage they have against Alpha and tells Daryl to be her proxy in the vote.

The vote at the council turns out to be a tie, Gabriel being the tiebreaker takes the night to consider his vote. The next morning while thinking over his vote, Gabriel goes to visit Negan but finds the cell empty; Lydia claims she allowed him to escape, but Daryl had watched her all night and knows this is a lie. Lydia locks herself up, knowing that she does not fit in with their group.

As proper repairs on the fence at Hilltop start, there are reports of a Whisperer near Oceanside. Michonne heads there with Judith and Luke, with Eugene staying behind to help with repairs. Alexandria has more graffiti on its buildings, saying "Silence the Whispers".

== Production ==
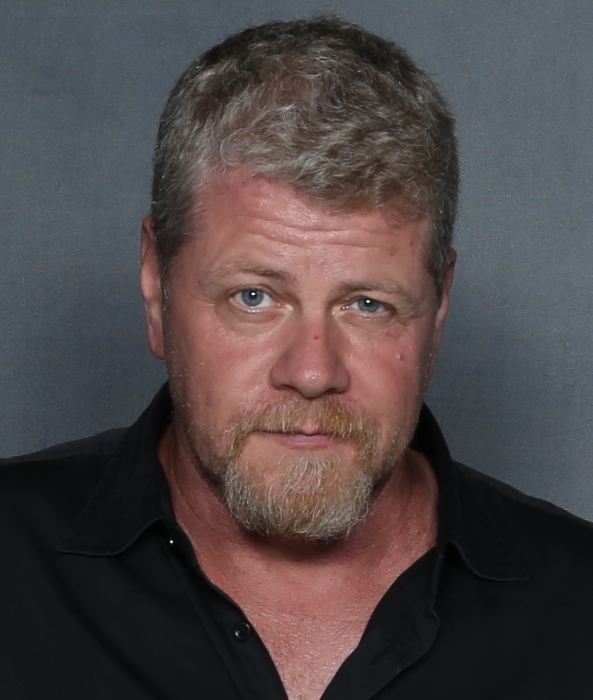
Michael Cudlitz, who played Abraham Ford, directed the episode.

The episode was directed by Michael Cudlitz, who portrayed Abraham Ford on the series. This is the second episode Cudlitz directed for The Walking Dead, he previously directed the season 9 episode "Stradivarius."

== Reception ==
=== Critical reception ===
"Silence the Whisperers" received critical acclaim from critics. On Rotten Tomatoes, the episode has an approval rating of 100% with an average score of 7.13 out of 10, based on 15 reviews. The site's critical consensus reads, "'Silence the Whisperers' offers a meditative focus on the developments of some lesser characters, all while continuing this season's compelling narrative thrust."

=== Ratings ===
"Silence the Whisperers" received a total viewership of 3.31 million. It was the highest-rated cable program of the night; however, it decreased in viewership from the previous week.
