= Nadia Hilker =

German actress (born 1988)

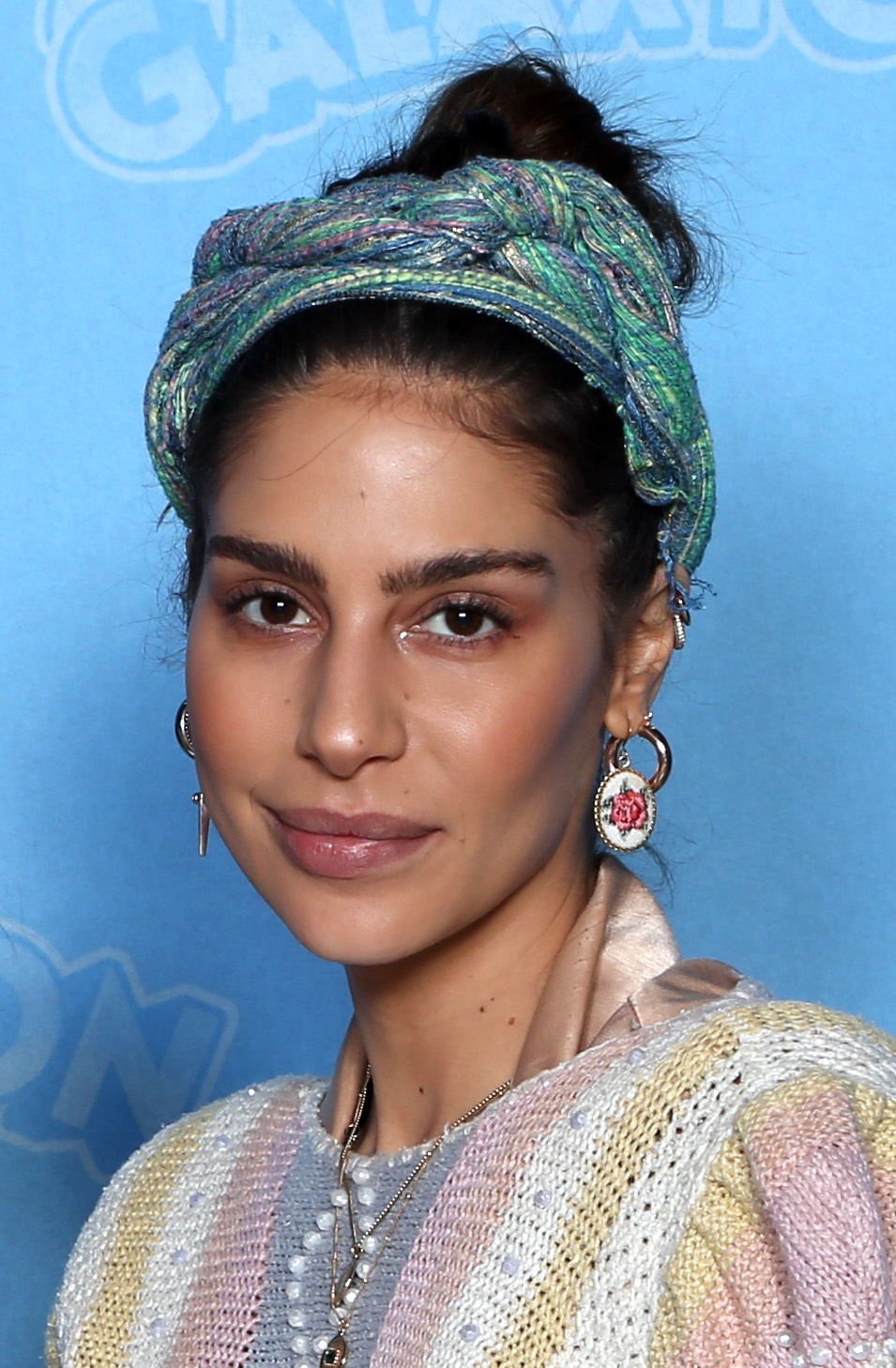
- Hilker at GalaxyCon Richmond in 2020
- Born: 1 December 1988 (age 36); Munich, West Germany
- Occupation: Actress
- Years active: 2010–present
- Children: 1

Nadia Hilker is a German actress, known for her roles in Spring (2014), The 100 (2016–2017), and The Walking Dead (2018–2022).

== Career ==
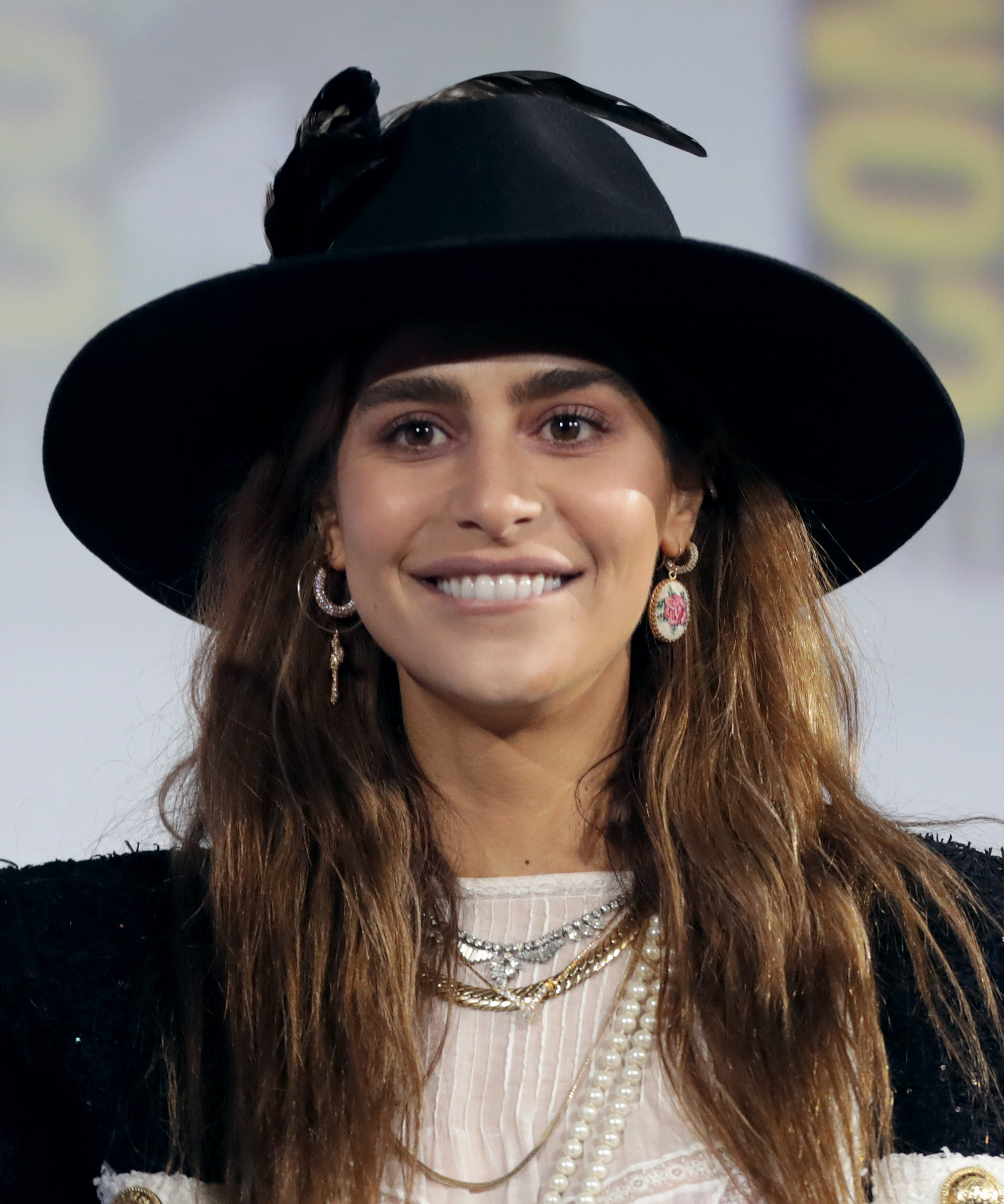
Hilker in 2019

Hilker was on camera for numerous German and international magazines and fashion companies and shot commercials for, among others, Clearasil and C & A. Through modeling, she came to acting. In the ARD feature film Zimmer mit Auntie, she played the female lead role alongside Jutta Speidel and Ingo Naujoks. This was followed by numerous series appearances and other roles in television films such as Rosamunde Pilcher's The Other Woman with Rupert Everett and Natalia Wörner. In 2014 she took over the female lead role in the feature film Spring.

A short film in which Hilker played a part was In the Gallery by Kai Sitter. The project was released in Munich in August 2013. The main focus of the film is on the relationships between five different characters, their encounters in a closed space and their interaction with each other. In this film, she shared the leading role with the actor and producer Seren Sahin. The film premiered in May 2014 in Berlin at the Moviemento and Kino Babylon.

From 2016 to 2017, Hilker was in seven episodes of the science fiction television series The 100.

In 2018, Hilker joined the cast of the AMC TV series The Walking Dead, playing a character named Magna.

In 2020, Hilker was in an episode of the second season of The Twilight Zone television series.

== Personal life ==
On March 12, 2024, Hilker announced on Instagram that she and her longtime boyfriend are expecting their first child in November 2024.

== Filmography ==
=== Film ===
Year	Title	Role	Notes
2014	Spring	Louise	
2014	In the Gallery	Zeynep	Short film
2016	The Divergent Series: Allegiant	Nita	
2016	Collide	Rowena	

=== Television ===
Year	Title	Role	Notes
2010	Zimmer mit Tante	Marie-Luise Seelig	TV movie
2010	Die Route	Xenia	TV movie
2010	SOKO München	Tina Pfeifer	Episode: "Schmarotzer"
2010	Alarm für Cobra 11	Shirin	Episode: "Für das Leben eines Freundes"
2010	Stuttgart Homicide	Tatjana Marquardt	Episode: "Knock Out"
2011	Für immer 30	Luca	TV movie
2012	Der letzte Bulle	Romy Weidner	Episode: "Ich sag's nicht weiter"
2012	SOKO München	Lena Weil	Episode: "Liebe, Sex und Tod"
2012	The Other Wife	Gemma Kendall	Miniseries
2013	München 7	Nadine	Episode: "Einfach anders"
2015	Breed	Ruby	TV pilot
2015	Huck	Betti	Episode: "Cannstatter Kurve"
2016–2017	The 100	Luna Kom Floukru	7 episodes
2018–2022	The Walking Dead	Magna	Recurring (Season 9); Also starring (Season 10); Main (Season 11); 30 episodes
2020	The Twilight Zone	Channing Carp	Episode: "8"
