= Eleanor Matsuura =

British actress (born 1981/1982)

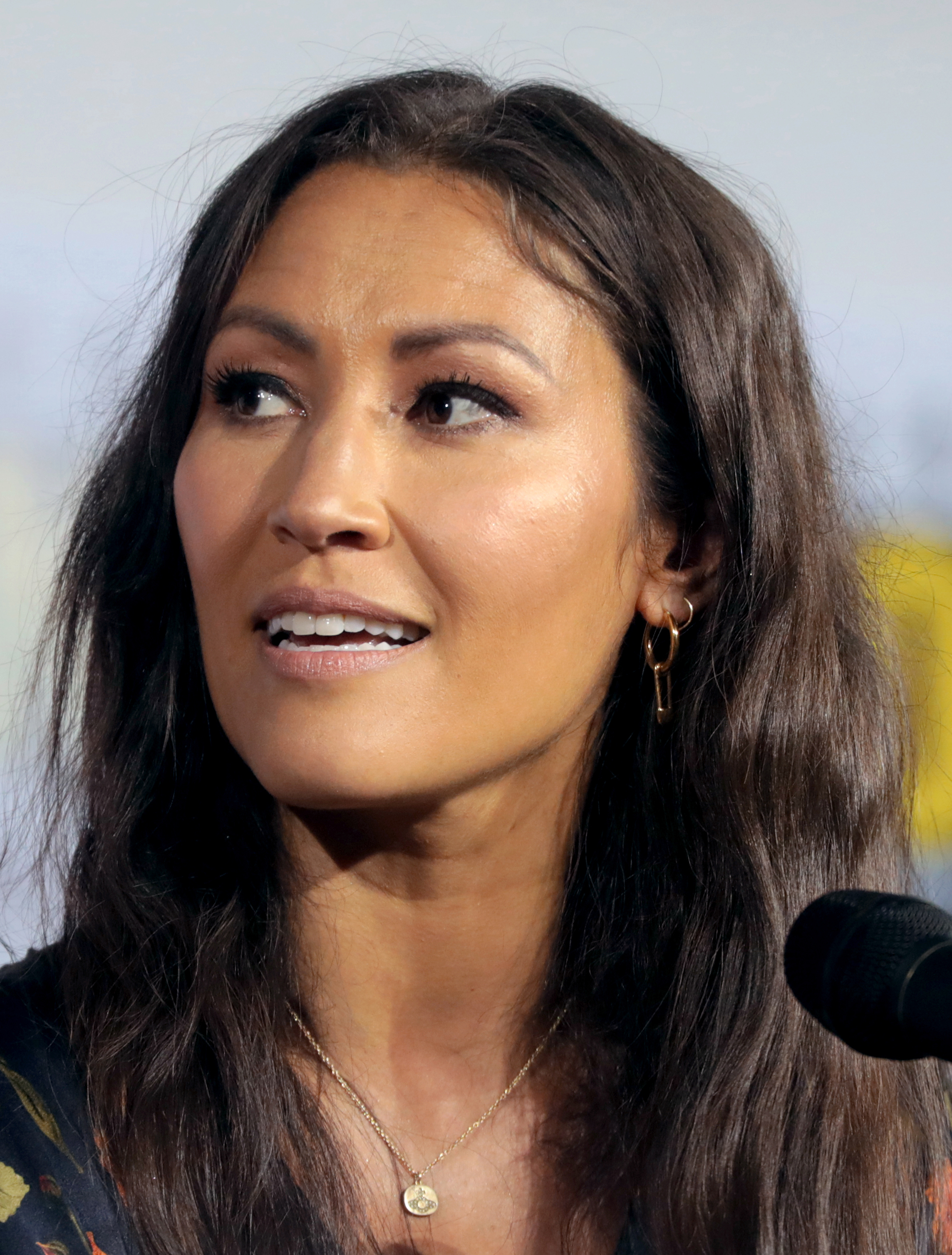
- Matsuura at San Diego Comic-Con in 2019
- Born: 1981/1982 (age 44–45); Tokyo, Japan
- Citizenship: United Kingdom
- Education: Central School of Speech and Drama
- Occupation: Actress
- Years active: 2005–present
- Spouse: Trevor White (m. 2014)
- Children: 1

Eleanor Matsuura (born 1981/1982) is a British actress best known for her roles as Yumiko in The Walking Dead, Hannah Santo in Spooks: The Greater Good, Bev in Utopia and as PC Donna Prager in Cuffs.

== Early life ==
Matsuura was born in Tokyo and grew up in Hertfordshire, England. She is of half-English and half-Japanese descent and does not speak Japanese. She was trained at the Central School of Speech and Drama in London and graduated in 2004. She is trained in modern and period dance.

== Career ==
Matsuura worked on stage at the Royal Court Theatre, Old Vic Theatre and several West End theatres. She has also appeared in several British TV dramas, including EastEnders, Thorne, Extras, Holby City, Lead Balloon, Doctor Who and Hustle; and in British films. In 2015 she appeared as Isobel in Bull at the Crucible Theatre, Sheffield.

Matsuura is in the fourth series of the BBC One drama series Sherlock, playing the role of Detective Inspector Hopkins. Starting in 2010, she has done voice acting for video games such as Mass Effect: Andromeda, Dreamfall Chapters, and the 2024 release Elden Ring Shadow of the Erdtree. She portrays Yumiko on the TV show The Walking Dead based on the comic book of the same name.

== Personal life ==
Matsuura is an animal rights supporter and works with the Battersea Dogs and Cats Home.

In 2014, Matsuura married Canadian actor Trevor White, whom she met in 2006 when they performed together in a Royal Shakespeare Company production of Coriolanus; as of 2016, the couple were living in the West Hampstead district of London. The couple have a daughter.

== Filmography ==
=== Film ===
Year	Title	Role	Notes
2006	Breaking and Entering	Ruby	
2006	After the Rain	Lian	Short
2007	Magicians	Waitress	
2012	The Grind	Charlie (Young Lady)	
2013	Alan Partridge: Alpha Papa	TV Reporter	
2013	The Love Punch	Michaela	
2014	Blood Moon	Black Deer	
2015	Spooks: The Greater Good	Hannah Santo	
2015	The Lady in the Van	Interviewer	
2015	Burn Burn Burn	Pandora	
2016	The Complete Walk: Antony and Cleopatra	Unknown	Short
2016	The 101-Year-Old Man Who Skipped Out on the Bill and Disappeared	Rebecca	
2017	Lost in London	Laura	
2017	Wonder Woman	Epione	
2017	Justice League	Epione	Uncredited
2018	Juliet, Naked	Cat	
2020	The One and Only Ivan	Candace Taylor	
2021	Zack Snyder's Justice League	Epione	Uncredited
2022	I Used to Be Famous	Amber	

=== Television ===
Year	Title	Role	Notes
2005	Hustle	Receptionist	Episode: "The Lesson"
2005	Holby City	Suzie Ford	Episode: "Damage Limitation"
2005	Extras	Producer's Wife	Episode: "Ben Stiller"
2005	A Very Social Secretary	Luz	TV movie
2006	EastEnders	Dr. Thorne	Episode: "Episode dated 5 January 2006"
2006	9/11: The Twin Towers	Operator #1	TV documentary
2006; 2008	Doctors	Diana Coverly; Erika Simms	Episode: "The Real Thing"; Episode: "Hidden Demons"
2007	Party Animals	Sally	Episode: "Episode #1.1"
2007	After You've Gone	Miss Murray	Episode: "Ripped Off"
2008	Trial & Retribution	Angela Clarkson	Episodes: "Conviction: Part 1" "Conviction: Part 2"
2008	Doctor Who	Jo Nakashima	Episode: "The Sontaran Stratagem"
2008	My Family	Doctor	Episode: "Neighbour Wars"
2008	Lead Balloon	Izzy	Episode: "Mistake"
2008; 2012	Casualty	Janie Newark; Kelly Leese	Episode: "Someone's Lucky Night"; Episode: "Duty of Care"
2009	Hunter	DI Zoe Larson	Episodes: "Episode #1.1" "Episode #1.2"
2009	The Old Guys	Marianne	Episode: "Marriage"
2009	FM	Jess	Episode: "System Addict"
2010	Money	Cherry	Episode: "Episode #1.1"
2011	Lunch Monkeys	Miss Fox	Episode: "Big Trouble in Little Cranford"
2011	Sirens	Tracy Kadam	Episode: "Two Man Race"
2011	New Tricks	Tiffany Hayes	Episode: "Old Fossils"
2011	The Fades	Vicky	4 episodes; mini series
2011–2012	The Royal Bodyguard	Dana	Episodes: "The Limping Assassin" "Bullets over Broad Street"
2012	Hacks	Ho Chi Mao Feast	TV movie
2012	Twenty Twelve	Doctor	Episode: "Inclusivity Day"
2012	Vexed	Emma	Episode: "Episode #2.1"
2013	Utopia	Bev	Episodes: "Episode #1.1" "Episode #1.2" "Episode #1.3"
2013	Law & Order: UK	Sophie Cohen	Episode: "Fatherly Love"
2014	The Smoke	Cindy	Episode: "Episode #1.3"
2014	Silk	Elizabeth Forester	Episode: "Episode #3.4"
2015	Residue	Angela Rossi	3 episodes; mini series
2015	Da Vinci's Demons	Madame Singh	6 episodes; recurring (season 3)
2015	Cuffs	PC Donna Prager	8 episodes; mini series
2016	The Comic Strip Presents Redtop	Wendi Deng	TV movie
2016	A Midsummer Night's Dream	Hippolyta	TV movie
2017	Sherlock	DI Hopkins	Episode: "The Six Thatchers"
2017–2019	Into the Badlands	Baron Juliet Chau	6 episodes; recurring role (seasons 2–3)
2018	Shetland	DI Jessie Cole	Episode: "Episode #4.5" "Episode #4.6"
2018–2022	The Walking Dead	Yumiko Okumura	Recurring (Season 9); Also Starring (Season 10); Main (Season 11); 30 episodes
2019	The Rook	Claudia Clifton	Episodes: "Chapter 1" "Chapter 2"
2021	This Time with Alan Partridge	Professor Rebecca Burns	Episode: "Series 2: Episode 6"
2024	The Day of the Jackal	Zina Jansone	
2026	Dear Life	Mary Matsumoto	TV series: 6 episodes

=== Video games ===
Year	Title	Role	Notes
2010	Doctor Who: The Adventure Game – Shadows of the Vashta Nerada	Dana Tanaka (voice)	
2014	Dreamfall Chapters	Saga (Age 35) (voice)	
2015	Dirty Bomb	Kira (voice)	
2015	Final Fantasy XIV: Heavensward	Ranger of Darkness / Yugiri (voice)	
2015	Star Wars: Battlefront	Unknown (voice)	
2016	Homefront: The Revolution	Unknown (voice)	
2017	Ghost Recon: Wildlands	Weaver (Female) (voice)	
2017	Mass Effect: Andromeda	Additional Voices (voice)	
2017	Final Fantasy XIV: Stormblood	Yugiri (English version, voice)	
2017	Lego Marvel Super Heroes 2	Unknown (voice)	
2017	Star Wars: Battlefront II	Unknown (voice)	
2017	Planet of the Apes: Last Frontier	Oaka (voice)	
2018	Subnautica	CTO Yu (voice)	
2018	World of Warcraft: Battle for Azeroth	Unknown (voice)	
2024	Elden Ring: Shadow of the Erdtree	Swordhand of Night Jolán (voice)	
TBA	Squadron 42	August Beck (voice)	
