= Judith Grimes =

- The Walking Dead character
- Judith Grimes, as portrayed by Cailey Fleming in the television series
- First appearance: Comic: "Issue #39" (2007); Television: "Killer Within" (2012)
- Last appearance: Comic: "Issue #48" (2008); Television: "The Last Time" (2024)
- Created by: Robert Kirkman; Tony Moore; Charlie Adlard
- Adapted by: Glen Mazzara (The Walking Dead)
- Portrayed by: Cailey Fleming (Season 9–11, The Walking Dead: The Ones Who Live); Several child actresses (Seasons 3–9)

In-universe information
- Nickname: Jude
- Occupation: Television series: Student at the Alexandria Safe-Zone (formerly); Soldier for the Coalition (formerly); Self-Defense Teacher at the Alexandria Safe-Zone (formerly); Student at the Commonwealth (current)
- Family: Lori Grimes (mother); Carl Grimes (half-brother); Rick Grimes (father); Comics: Sophia Peletier (sister-in-law); Andrea Grimes II (half-niece); Television series: Michonne (adoptive mother); Rick Grimes Jr. (half brother); Daryl Dixon (adoptive uncle); Carol Peletier (adoptive aunt); Maggie Rhee (adoptive aunt); Rosita Espinosa (adoptive aunt); Aaron (adoptive uncle); Hershel Rhee (adoptive cousin); Socorro Espinosa (adoptive cousin); Gracie (adoptive cousin)

Judith Grimes is a fictional character from the comic book series The Walking Dead. In the television series of the same name, she is primarily portrayed by Cailey Fleming. She was portrayed by several child actors when the character was younger.

== Appearances ==
=== Comic series ===
Judith is the daughter of Lori Grimes and the adopted daughter of Rick Grimes, and the younger half-sister of Carl Grimes. Judith's biological father is probably Shane, though this has not been confirmed. However, Rick told Lori he did not care if she was Shane's daughter because he will still love her as his daughter. During The Governor's last assault on the prison, Lori is killed by Lilly while holding Judith. Lori falls, crushing Judith, leaving Rick and Carl in total devastation.

=== Television series ===
==== Season 3 ====
Judith Grimes first appeared in the episode "Killer Within" where she was born via caesarean section carried out by Maggie due to complications that Lori Grimes had during labor. During the caesarean section, Lori loses a lot of blood and agonizingly says goodbye to Carl as he shoots her out of mercy to avoid her reanimation. On the day she was born, Glenn and Maggie go to get formula milk when Hershel told them baby Judith could not survive without it. Daryl nicknames her the "Little Asskicker". Baby Judith was often in the care of Beth and Carol throughout the season.

==== Season 4 ====
When an outbreak of a deadly flu came to the prison community, Judith fortunately survived the outbreak. During the last assault of the Governor, she was saved by the sisters Lizzie and Mika Samuels who take the little baby with Tyreese and together they begin making their way to Terminus. On the road, Tyreese decides to help a father and his son, leaving the little ones to their fate as a group of walkers approach. The girls were saved by Carol. When Tyreese and Carol realized Lizzie's mental breakdown after seeing Lizzie murder Mika, Lizzie reveals that she wanted to kill Judith to see her become a walker and Carol manages to stop her. During a debate with Tyreese, they decide to eliminate Lizzie to avoid hurting Judith and the rest of the people. Later, they travelled with Judith to Terminus.

==== Season 5 ====
Judith is still in the care of Tyreese and Carol. When Carol, Tyreese, and Judith arrive near Terminus, a walker tries to attack them and is subdued by Carol, then baby Judith begins to cry attracting more nearby walkers. Carol, Tyreese, and Judith flee until they reach a cabin where they see a man named Martin, from Terminus, standing guard in the cabin. Listening in on his conversation over a walkie, they discover their friends are being held captive at Terminus. Carol and Tyreese subdue the man and question him. Carol decides to save the group while Tyreese stays at the cabin with Judith and Martin. Martin manages to take Judith as a hostage, but Tyreese beats him unconscious, saving her life. After the rescue of Rick and the group Carol appears before Rick and the rest of the group. Carol takes Rick and Carl to Judith who happily reunite again.

Judith was accompanied by her father and the group manage to reach the church of Fr. Gabriel Stokes who gives them asylum in his church. The church ends up being a slaughterhouse of the people from Terminus who hunted the group. After the deaths of Beth and Tyreese, Judith arrives into the safe-zone (called Alexandria) along with the group and was guided by a community recruiter named Aaron.

==== Season 6 ====
When the group was working against the massive herd of walkers in a nearby quarry, a group of scavengers called "The Wolves" invade the community by slaughtering several Alexandrians. Carl protects his sister Judith while the group manages to annihilate the Wolves. The shots and the sound a truck horn attracted the herd that were diverting the group, while the walkers invade the safe-zone. Fr. Gabriel carried Judith to his church and the community successfully eliminate the walkers. When Rick and Michonne revealed their romance, Michonne became Judith's mother figure.

==== Season 7 ====
When Negan meets Judith, he becomes fond of her despite having a rough relationship with her father and promises to protect her and Carl. Later, Judith was transported to the Hilltop. She sits on the ground while Maggie and Jesus talk. Shortly after, Judith stands up and is carried away by Enid.

==== Season 8 ====
Judith was always in the care of the Alexandrians during the war against the Saviors, later Carl discovers that he was bitten by a walker, he decides to spend a day with his little sister. Before his death, she manages to survive under the sewers when Negan bombs Alexandria and the little girl is successfully taken to the Hilltop Colony.

==== Season 9 ====
Eighteen months after the fall of Negan, Judith lives happily with Rick and Michonne. When problems begin within the communities, Rick is forced to deal with a herd of walkers by destroying a bridge in order to save the communities. The group believes that Rick died. Six years later, a group of survivors led by a woman named Magna are overwhelmed by a herd of walkers. A little girl with a sheriff's hat appears and saves them from the herd. She introduces herself as Judith Grimes. It is later revealed that Judith disagrees with her adoptive mother Michonne about Judith's friendly relationship with Negan. Judith also has a half-brother named Rick Grimes Jr., the son of Rick and Michonne conceived before Rick's presumed death. Several months after the massacre during the community's fair done by Alpha, she was saved by Negan when she attempted to save Daryl's dog in the large blizzard during the winter.

==== Season 10 ====
In "Lines We Cross", some months after the blizzard, Judith and the Coalition form a militia in order to train the residents of the communities to face any future threats. She takes part in a training exercise on the Oceanside beach. As Ezekiel and Jerry methodically release walkers from a shipwrecked boat, Judith and the other militia work together as a unit to take out the walker threat. Later on, Judith and R.J. play with some shells that R.J. found. As they dump out their seashells in the sand, a Whisperer mask falls out. Judith gets scared and informs the rest of the group. A while later, Judith tells R.J. the story about Rick blowing the bridge to save his friends. "He died and went to heaven," Judith tells R.J. about "the brave man" in her story. Michonne walks up to hug them, telling them she'd do anything to protect them. Suddenly, an explosion rings out and everyone looks up to witness streaks of fire cascading from the sky. Judith then stays at the camp looking after her brother as the adults deal with the situation.

In "Ghosts", while the Alexandria residents face against waves of walkers pouring onto the community gates over the next 49 hours, Judith stays at her home looking after her brother. When Michonne checks on them in the morning, Judith reminds her mother it's not safe to go to sleep. The next day, Judith keeps looking after her brother when Michonne arrives to sleep with them. As they lay together in bed, Michonne explains to Judith that it is safe to sleep for now.

In "Silence the Whisperers", Judith and her family dine together and share a laugh as they are joined by Daryl. The following morning, Judith accompanies Michonne to visit the Hilltop to help out the community after a tree has fallen down. On the way, Michonne tells Judith never to take enemies by their word. Judith suggests the Whisperers are probably trying to tire them out like R.J. does before he goes to sleep. Suddenly, Michonne spots Ezekiel riding on his own and tells Judith and the group to continue while she investigates. Later that day, the group catches up and they continue their travel to Hilltop. That night, Judith and the convoy arrive to help the Hilltop residents fight off the invading walkers. While fighting, Judith takes out walkers by herself to the proud smile of her mom. The following morning, Judith listens to the council meeting where Michonne announces she will be delivering supplies to Oceanside after receiving reports of potential Whisperer activity. She becomes surprised when Michonne says she will accompany her. Later that day, Judith and a group prepare their convoy and head out on their journey towards Oceanside.

In "The World Before", Judith and the group continue their journey towards Oceanside when they stop briefly after Scott comes across recent footprints on their path. When Luke says he is going as a representative of Hilltop, she jokes that he really wants to see Jules and then asks him what he was whistling before. He explains he was whistling one of his favorite songs and writes it down for her in a book where she is documenting everything that happens to them for the future. When Luke suggests stopping at a nearby library along the way to look for more books, Judith convinces her mother to accept after complaining that she has already read almost every book back in Alexandria. When the group heads inside the library, Judith finds a Russian-English dictionary she gives to Luke for Eugene to understand the satellite parts. As Michonne tells her daughter they can read a book together, she is called over the radio by Magna. Upon hearing Luke screaming for help, she and the group find him in the music section where he explains he was saved by a man before he fled. Judith then remains in silence as her mother informs him of Siddiq's death. Later that day, the group arrives at Oceanside where Judith witnesses as the residents bring the man that saved Luke to the camp and accuse him of being a Whisperer. While the stranger begs he simply wants to get back to his family, Judith watches as the group debates what to do with him. When walkers suddenly invade, she helps take out the threat and slashes the man in the leg to stop him from escaping. Judith then calls out to her mother who proudly congratulates her. That night, Judith reads a book from the man's backpack when he suddenly wakes up. He claims the book is for his daughter and attempts to stop her from reading it but falls due to being tied up. Judith tells him to be careful with his stitches and then leaves when her mother arrives to question him. A while later, Michonne tells Judith her plan of helping the man get back to his family on a naval base in exchange for weapons to destroy Alpha's horde but says she needs to go alone. Judith understands her mother's decision and they hug. The next day, Judith listens as Michonne informs the group of her mission and gives them a radio to contact her if they need to. She also tells Judith she can contact her at any time and reminds her to be good with her uncle Daryl until she returns. Judith then bids her mother farewell before she and the rest of the group travel back to their communities.

In "Stalker," Judith befriends the former Whisperer known as Gamma and helps to defend her against Beta's incursion into Alexandria. At one point, Judith shoots Beta, but he survives due to Beta wearing body armor.

In "Walk with Us," Judith takes part in the defense of the Hilltop against the Whisperers, instinctively killing an attacking Whisperer who sneaks up on her, much to Judith's shock. After escaping from the Hilltop's destruction with the other kids, Judith is shocked and saddened to discover that Earl Sutton has been fatally bitten. Earl charges Judith with keeping the other kids safe before committing suicide in an effort to protect them. However, Earl fails to destroy his brain and he reanimates, forcing Judith to put him down. The kids are found by Daryl, Ezekiel and Jerry moments later and Daryl comforts the young girl.

In "What We Become," Michonne contacts Judith after leaving the naval base, revealing that she has found proof that Rick might still be alive somewhere. Judith encourages her mother to go after her father, suggesting that Rick might need Michonne more than they do now that Alpha's dead. Michonne agrees to go and to keep in contact with Judith for as long as possible while she looks.

In "The Tower," Judith joins Daryl in patrolling as the survivors hide from the Whisperers in an abandoned hospital. While Judith has told Daryl of Michonne's departure, she has not revealed that her mother is looking for Rick. The two have also lost contact with Michonne.

In "A Certain Doom," as the survivors get trapped in the abandoned hospital by the Whisperers' horde, Gabriel reassures Judith that they have each other and anyone outside who might be trying to reach them. Judith joins the others in evacuating and, after the Whisperers defeat, is reunited with Maggie who had returned just in time to save Gabriel from the Whisperers.

==== Season 11 ====
In "For Blood," Judith takes shelter from a storm and a herd that threatens the badly damaged Alexandria, talking with Virgil about the still missing Michonne. As walkers invade the house, Judith gets trapped in the flooding basement with Gracie.

In "No Other Way," Judith and Gracie are rescued from the flooding basement by Aaron. After the storm, Daryl and the remnants of Maggie's team return as does Eugene with Lance Hornsby and troops from the Commonwealth who offer to help rebuild Alexandria and a new home in the Commonwealth for its citizens.

In "New Haunts," Judith has moved to the Commonwealth with her brother and Daryl and has begun attending school there.

In "Lockdown," Judith and the other children are targeted by Lance Hornsby's spies, but they are protected by Jerry.

In "A New Deal," after the communities decide to go their separate ways, Judith argues with Daryl about staying to help the Commonwealth, even running away at one point. Daryl eventually admits that he wants to help too, but he is torn by his need to protect Judith and RJ. When walkers attack the Founders Day celebration, Judith insists upon helping Daryl to defend the crowd and he returns Rick's Colt Python to her, Judith having previously refused to take the gun back. Judith, Daryl and Mercer eliminate the walkers attacking the crowd with Judith killing the walker that fatally bit Sebastian Milton too late to save his life.

In "Family," after Alexandria is liberated from the Commonwealth's control, Judith insists upon joining the mission to the Commonwealth to take down Pamela Milton, passing Carl's hat down to RJ before she leaves. During the firefight with Pamela's forces, Judith pushes Maggie out of the way, saving her life, but is shot herself by Pamela, leaving Judith unconscious and severely wounded. As walkers overrun the Commonwealth, Judith's friends desperately try to get to the hospital for help.

In "Rest in Peace," Daryl manages to get Judith to the hospital, only to find it abandoned as Pamela has pulled all of the doctors and essential personnel to her gated community, the Estates. Briefly awakening, Judith manages to barricade the hospital doors against the herd. Daryl later gives Judith a blood transfusion to help stabilize her and Judith reveals to Daryl and Carol that Rick's still alive and Michonne is out looking for him. Judith admits that she hadn't told them before because Judith was afraid that if she did, Daryl and Carol would go out looking for her parents and she'd lose more people that she cares about. With the help of Mercer and his men, the group manages to sneak into the Estates where Tomi successfully treats Judith's injuries. Judith takes part in the confrontation against Pamela, begging the governor to help the people trapped outside and then not to give up and kill herself after Pamela is defeated. Following the defeat of Pamela and the Commonwealth being saved, Judith takes part in a celebration and is the first to realize that's something's wrong from Rosita's behavior.

A year later, Judith is still living in the Commonwealth when Daryl departs to try to find Rick and Michonne. Judith promises to look after Dog for him and tells Daryl that he deserves to find a happy ending too. Looking out over the fields of the Commonwealth, Judith tells her brother that "we get to start over. We're the ones who live."

=== The Walking Dead: Daryl Dixon ===
Judith appears in a flashback in the series premiere as Daryl washes up in France, telling Daryl that he deserves a happy ending too. Later, Laurent echoes Judith's words to Daryl during Daryl and Laurent's first conversation.

Daryl lists Judith as one of the people whom he misses back in America and finds himself increasingly torn between the family that he's building in France and the one that he has in America, particularly because of Daryl's promise to Judith that he would find her parents and bring them home for her.

=== The Walking Dead: The Ones Who Live ===
Judith appears several times in Michonne's flashbacks throughout her journey. It's revealed that even after Michonne had passed out of radio range with her daughter, she would still try to send Judith messages.

In the series finale, Michonne finally contacts Judith with the news that she's coming home, having successfully found Rick. In a field, Rick and Michonne are reunited with their children and Judith tells her father that she had always believed that he was still out there, and she had never given up hope of Rick some day returning. As CRM helicopters fly overhead to deliver supplies to communities in need, the Grimes family embraces each other.

== Development and reception ==
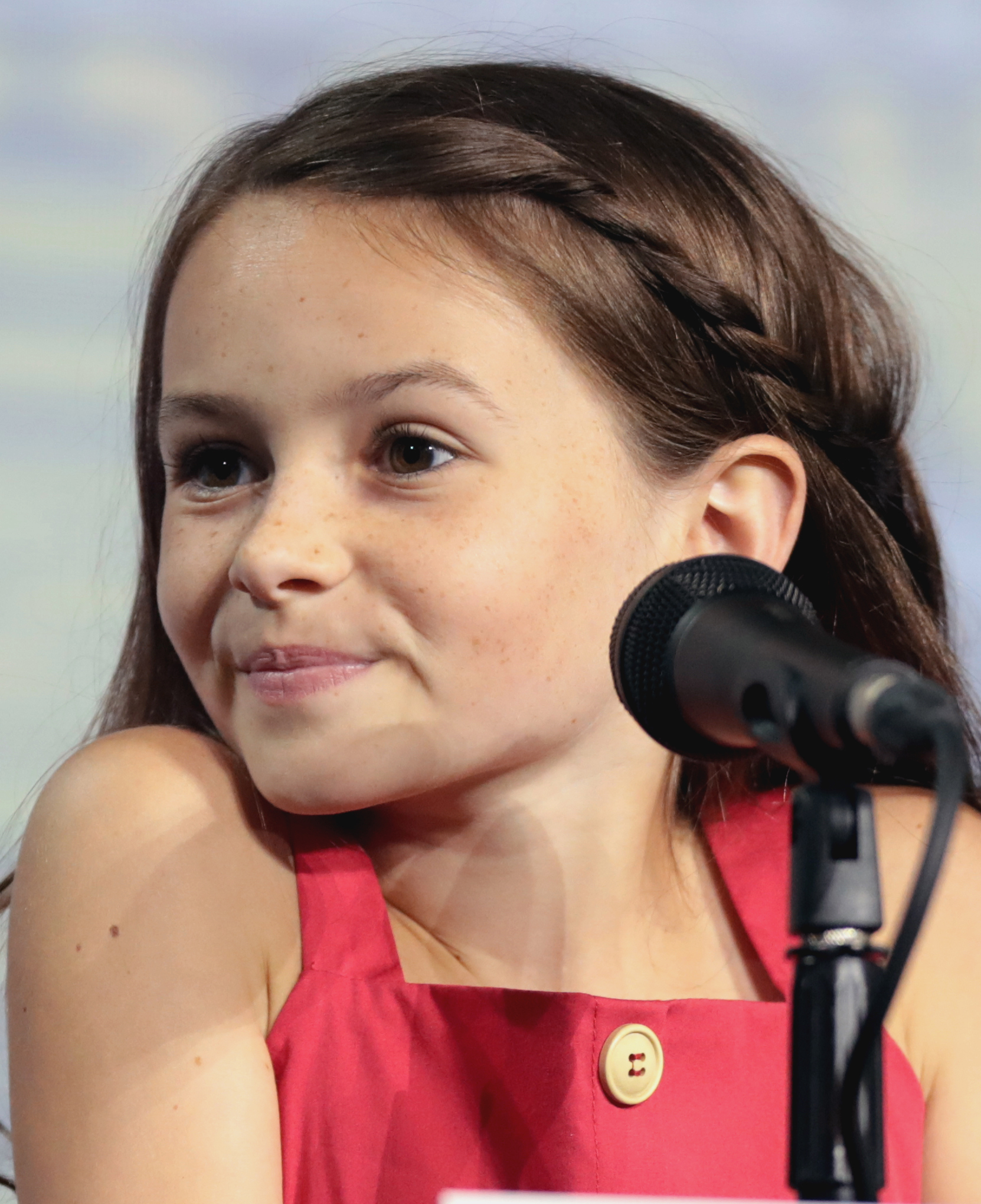
Cailey Fleming portrays Judith Grimes in the television adaptation.

Cailey Fleming entered the final part of the fifth episode "What Comes After" in the ninth season as part of the recurring cast and despite that she appeared in the section "also starring". In the following tenth season, Fleming was promoted to the main cast of the series giving importance to being a member of the surviving Grimes family.

According to showrunner Angela Kang, to adapt the comic's story, they plan on taking some of the role that Carl had and giving them to Judith, now aged similarly to Carl, which allows them to follow the main threads of the comic's Whisperer arc but with a new take using Judith's personality.

Matt Fowler of IGN expressed in this way about the development of Cailey Fleming portraying Judith Grimes after a brief appearance in season 9:

"I'm here to kick ass and chew bubblegum. And I've never tried bubblegum because it's a long-dead confectionary of a world I never knew."

— Cailey Fleming

Louisa Mellor writing for Den of Geek! praised Cailey Fleming and said: "Judith Grimes is hardly the only, or the first powerful little girl on TV with things to teach us. She's part of a growing gang (Lisa Simpson's the founding member, obviously, Stranger Things' Eleven is the muscle). These girls and their real-world counterparts are here with lessons to teach us, and mostly, we're all ears."

Josh Wigler of The Hollywood Reporter said: "As played by Star Wars: The Force Awakens actress Cailey Fleming, Judith's arrival as an apocalypse-tested warrior marks a major deviation from how events unfold in Robert Kirkman and Charlie Adlard's Walking Dead comic books on which the AMC show is based. In their original telling of the tale, Judith died as an infant, alongside her mother Lori when the Governor unleashed the full power of Woodbury on the prison. In the TV series, Lori died much earlier than expected, while Judith's fate was left lingering following the Governor's assault on the prison. It was revealed some episodes later that baby Judith wound up in the care of Carol and Tyreese, featured heavily in season four's episode "The Grove", a consensus pick for one of the very best episodes in Walking Dead history."

Kirsten Acuna writing for Insider write and praise Angela Kang's work as showrunner. Kang stated about Fleming: "She's such a professional actress at 11 years old. Her first two days on set, the actors, Danai [Gurira], Jeffrey [Dean Morgan], they're all like, 'Oh my God, she's out-acting all of us.' They really love the work that she's doing and love working with her. She's just absolutely fantastic for us."

Christopher Weston writing for HITC praised the ninth season including the character of Cailey Fleming as Judith Grimes and said: "The show was an immense success, becoming one of the most widely discussed and watched efforts on TV at the time. However, enthusiasts will know that series' can feel a little stale as they overstay their welcome. Gradually, many fans began to fall out of love with The Walking Dead, feeling that it was dragging on unnecessarily. Over the years they've thrown in new faces and curveballs to keep things interesting, and with season 10 now in full swing, we're welcoming Cailey Fleming firmly to the fold."

Erik Kain of Forbes commented on her appearance in "Who Are You Now?", saying: "Judith is a great little kid. She's tough, sweet, compassionate, and just an all around badass that the people of Alexandria respect and even defer to in some instances. A budding relationship is forming between her and Negan, who remains in prison though with a good deal less hair. Whatever relationship was supposed to form between Carl and Negan is happening instead between these two, with Judith on the steps doing math and Negan telling her what's the point."

The writer Alex Zalben of Decider praised Fleming's development in the series and said: "Cailey Fleming playing Judith Grimes is easily her biggest role so far. Walking Dead has been a mixed bag when it comes to child actors (there have been some... not so great ones), but with Fleming's strong back catalog of roles, tall Judith looks like it'll fall on the better side of the equation."

Kevin Lever of Tell-Tale TV praised the performance of Fleming as Judith and wrote: "There's a lot of great work being done with Judith that's fleshing her out as the kindest heart left in this world."
