= Reaper (disambiguation) =

A reaper is a farm tool or machine for harvesting grain.

(The) Reaper(s) may also refer to:

== Arts and entertainment ==
=== Artwork ===
- Reaper (Van Gogh series), a 1889 series of paintings by Vincent van Gogh
- Reapers (painting), a 1785 painting by George Stubbs
- The Reaper (Miró painting), a lost 1937 painting by Joan Miró
- The Reaper (Bohland), a 1952 sculpture by Gustav Bohland in Milwaukee, Wisconsin

=== Film and television ===
- The Reaper (2013 film), a Mexican film
- The Reaper (2014 film), a Croatian-Slovenian film
- Reaper (film), a 2014 American horror/crime film
- Reaper Award, an American horror-film award
- Reaper (TV series), a 2007–2009 American comedy-drama series
- "Reaper" (Smallville), a television episode
- "The Reaper" (Swamp People), a television episode

=== Literature ===
- The Reaper (magazine), an American literary magazine 1980–1989
- Reaper (novel), a 1998 novel by Ben Mezrich
- The Reaper, a 2015 autobiography, and Reaper, a 2018–2020 novel series, by Nicholas Irving

=== Music ===
- "Els Segadors" (The Reapers), national anthem of Catalonia
- "(Don't Fear) The Reaper", a song by Blue Öyster Cult, 1976
- Reaper (band), a German electro-industrial band
- Reaper (album), by Nothing,Nowhere, 2017
- "Reaper" (song), by Sia, 2017
- "Reapers" (song), by Muse, 2016
- The Reaper (album), by Grave Digger, 1993
- "The Reaper" (The Chainsmokers song), 2019

=== Video games ===
- Reaper: Tale of a Pale Swordsman, a 2013 action role-playing game
- Reaper, a 1991 ZX Spectrum game

=== Fictional characters and elements ===
- Reaper (Adventure Time character), in episode "Wizard"
- Reaper (comics), various characters from the Marvel and DC Comics universes
- Reaper (Overwatch), in the video game Overwatch
- Reaper, in the video game Ace Combat Infinity
- Reaper Leviathan, in the video game Subnautica
- Reapers (Doctor Who), in the Doctor Who episode "Father's Day"
- Reapers (Mass Effect), in the original Mass Effect trilogy
- Reapers, in the 2014-2020 TV series The 100
- Reapers, and the Reaper virus, in the 2002 film Blade II
- Reaper virus, in the 2008 film Doomsday
- The Reapers, introduced in season 10 of the TV series The Walking Dead

== Vehicles ==
- Reaper (sailing vessel), a 1901 restored Fifie fishing boat
- Reaper (schooner), a Massachusetts privateer schooner during the War of 1812
- HMS Reaper (D82), a 1943 United States aircraft carrier leased to the Royal Navy
- General Atomics MQ-9 Reaper, an unmanned aerial vehicle
- Reaper, a gold dredge featured on the TV show Bering Sea Gold

== Other uses ==
- Reaper (program), software used to remove the Creeper worm
- REAPER (Rapid Environment for Audio Production, Engineering, and Recording), a digital audio workstation software
- Maryland Reapers, an American Indoor Football league team in 2012
- Reaper Miniatures, an American manufacturer of gaming figurines
- Robert Whittaker (fighter), a New Zealand–Australian mixed martial artist

== See also ==
- "Els Segadors" (lit. "The Reapers"), the anthem of Catalonia
- Reap (disambiguation)
- Grim Reaper (disambiguation)
- Don't Fear the Reaper (disambiguation)
