= Grim Reaper (disambiguation) =

The Grim Reaper is a personification of death.

Grim Reaper(s) may also refer to:

== As a nickname ==
=== Military ===
- 493rd Fighter Squadron, USAF F-15 Eagle squadron
- VF-10, aviation unit of the US Navy from 1942 to 1945
- VFA-101, US Navy Fleet Replacement Squadron active 1952–2005 and 2012–19

=== People ===
- Gregory Scarpa, mafia hitman for the Colombo crime family
- Stu Grimson, Canadian ice hockey player active in the NHL from 1989 to 2002
- Patrick Mahomes, American quarterback for the Kansas City Chiefs
- Mitch McConnell, American politician and Senate Republican leader since 2007

== Art and entertainment ==
- Grim Reaper (band), a British heavy metal band
- "Grim Reaper of Love", a 1966 single by the American rock band The Turtles
- "The Grim Reaper", a song by King Gizzard & the Lizard Wizard from Omnium Gatherum

=== Films and television ===
- Grim Reaper (film), a 2007 horror film
- The Grim Reaper, episode 37 of Thriller (American TV series)
- La commare secca, typically titled in English as The Grim Reaper, a 1962 Italian mystery film directed by Bernardo Bertolucci
- Antropophagus, distributed in the US as The Grim Reaper, a 1980 Italian horror film directed by Joe D'Amato

=== Characters ===
- Grim Reaper (Marvel Comics), a Marvel Comics supervillain
- Grim Reaper (Nedor Comics), a Nedor Comics hero
- Grim Reaper aka Grim, a character in the animated TV series The Grim Adventures of Billy & Mandy; see List of The Grim Adventures of Billy & Mandy characters

== Other ==
- Grim Reaper (advertisement), a 1987 Australian AIDS awareness campaign
- Grim Reapers Motorcycle Club (Canada), a Canadian outlaw motorcycle club (MC) established in 1967
- Grim Reapers Motorcycle Club (USA), an American outlaw motorcycle club (MC) established in 1965
- The Grim Reaper, an error alert that replaced the Guru Meditation in later versions of AmigaOS
- The Grim Reapers: The Anatomy of Organized Crime in America, 1970 non-fiction book by Ed Reid

== See also ==
- Reaper (disambiguation)
- Thanatotheristes, a genus of dinosaur, literally "death harvester"
