= Reaping (disambiguation) =

Reaping typically refers to the cutting of grain or pulse for harvest.

Reaping may also refer to:

- The Reaping, a 2007 horror film
- The Reaping (audio drama), a Big Finish Productions audio drama based on the television series Doctor Who
- Reaper, also "reaping machine", a farm tool or machine for harvesting grain
- Sickle, also "reaping-hook", a curved-blade agriculture tool typically used for harvesting

== See also ==
- Reap (disambiguation)
- Reaper (disambiguation)
