= Cailey Fleming =

American actress (born 2007)

Cailey Presley Fleming
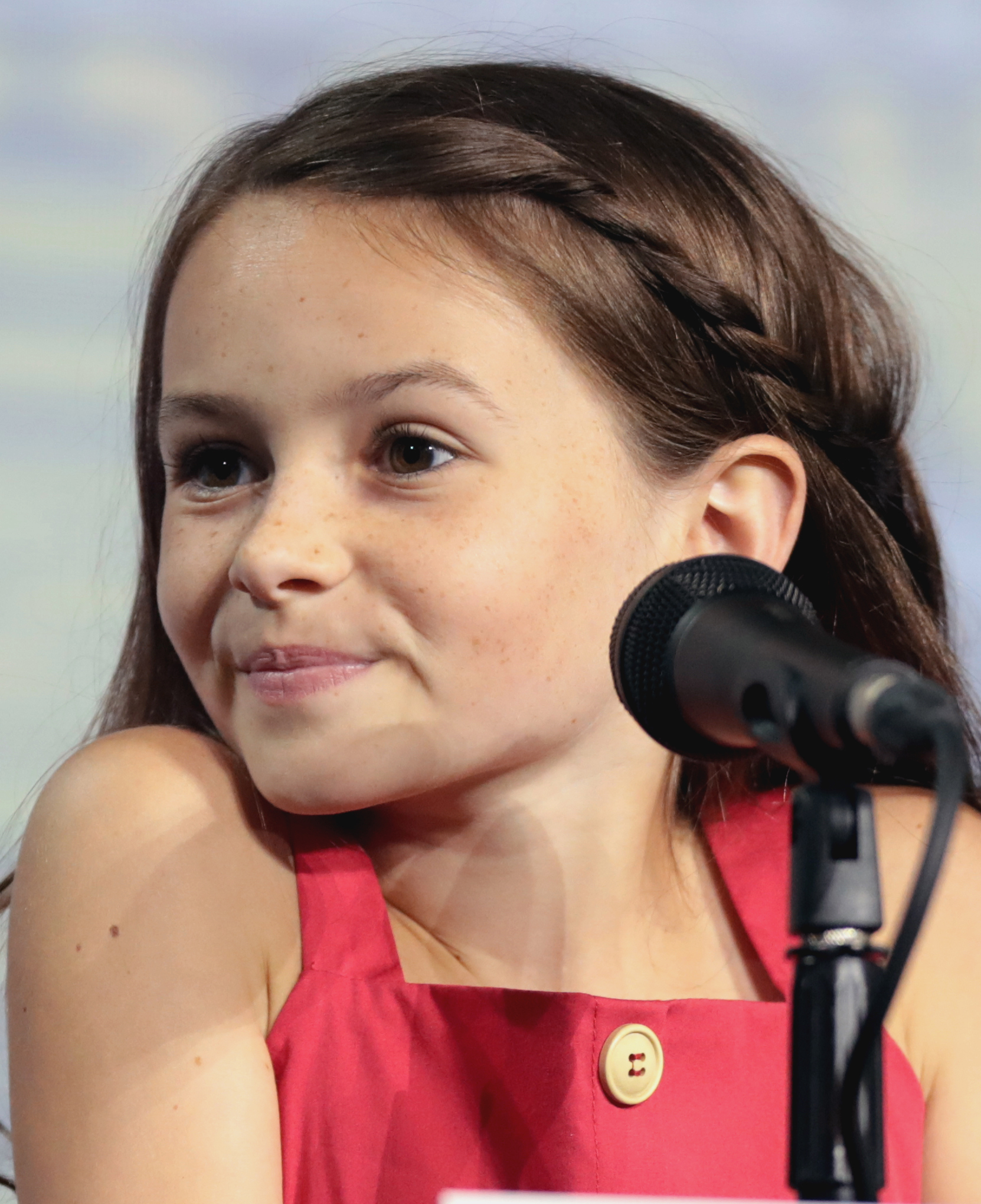
- Fleming at the 2019 San Diego Comic-Con in San Diego, California
- Born: Cailey Presley Fleming; March 28, 2007 (age 19); Picayune, Mississippi, U.S.
- Occupation: Actress
- Years active: 2015–present

Cailey Presley Fleming (born March 28, 2007) is an American actress. She gained prominence for her portrayal of Judith Grimes in the AMC horror-drama television series The Walking Dead (2018–2022), as young Rey in Star Wars: The Force Awakens, and as the main character, Bea, in the feature film IF (2024) by John Krasinski.

== Early life and career ==
Cailey Presley Fleming was born on March 28, 2007 in Picayune, Mississippi. Her parents are Mathew and Misty Fleming and she has a brother, Chandler. At age eight, she began acting professionally, first gaining attention in Star Wars: The Force Awakens, portraying young Rey. The role gained significant attention due to the film's success. In 2018, Cailey Fleming joined the cast of AMC in The Walking Dead during season nine as Judith Grimes, and became a series regular beginning with season ten. She briefly appeared in Loki episode four as Young Sylvie. In January 2022, Fleming was cast as Bea in the comedy film, IF, directed by John Krasinski who also acts in it.

== Filmography ==
=== Film ===
Year	Title	Role	Notes
2015	Star Wars: The Force Awakens	Young Rey	
2016	The Book of Love	Young Millie Pearlman	
2017	Armed Response	Danielle	
2017	Desolation	Grace	
2018	Supercon	Lizzie Fisher Fan	
2018	Hover	Greta Dunn	
2018	Peppermint	Carly North	
2019	Star Wars: The Rise of Skywalker	Young Rey	Archive footage
2024	IF	Bea	

=== Television ===
Year	Title	Role	Notes
2015	One Mississippi	Young Tig	Episode: "Pilot"
2016	Memoir	Obee	Television short
2017	Preacher	Susie	Episode: "The End of the Road"
2017	Better Things	Sorrow	4 episodes
2018–2022	The Walking Dead	Judith Grimes	Recurring (season 9), starring (seasons 10–11); 32 episodes
2019	Creepshow	Evie	Episode: "The House of the Head"
2021	Loki	Young Sylvie	Episode: "The Nexus Event"
2024	The Walking Dead: The Ones Who Live	Judith Grimes	Episode: "The Last Time"
