= Reap =

REAP may refer to:

== Government and organisations ==
- Reserve Educational Assistance Program, Chapter 1607 (G.I. Bill of Rights), a Department of Defense education benefit program
- Re-Engineering Assessment Practices, one of six projects funded under the Scottish Funding Council's E-learning Transformation Programme
- Resource and Energy Analysis Programme, a specialist programme of the Stockholm Environment Institute
- Rice Exporters Association of Pakistan, a Pakistani business association

== Other uses ==
- The Reap, a 1997 arcade shooter computer game
- Rounding Errors in Algebraic Processes, a mathematical book by James H. Wilkinson published in 1963
- "Reap", a song by The Red Jumpsuit Apparatus from the album Am I the Enemy

== See also ==
- Reaper (disambiguation)
- Reaping (disambiguation)
