= We Are the End of the World =

- The Walking Dead episode
- Episode no.: Season 10; Episode 2
- Directed by: Greg Nicotero
- Written by: Nicole Mirante-Matthews
- Cinematography by: Stephen Campbell
- Editing by: Tiffany Melvin
- Original air date: October 13, 2019
- Running time: 44 minutes

Guest appearance
- Thora Birch as Gamma / Mary

Episode chronology
← Previous "Lines We Cross"	Next → "Ghosts"
- The Walking Dead season 10

"We Are the End of the World" is the second episode of the tenth season of the post-apocalyptic horror television series The Walking Dead, which aired on AMC on October 13, 2019. The episode was written by Nicole Mirante-Matthews and directed by Greg Nicotero.

A flashback reveals the origins of Alpha (Samantha Morton) and Beta (Ryan Hurst). Alpha attempts to toughen up Lydia (Havana Blum) as they prepare to walk with the dead. Meanwhile, the Whisperers create their herds. The episode was positively received by critics.

== Plot ==
In the past, Alpha and Lydia struggle to survive on the road. The two have learned how to walk among the dead by covering themselves with skin and staying quiet. Lydia, still frightened by the noises, wears earmuffs to muffle the sounds, but panics when a walker knocks them off. Her mother drags her into a nearby sanitarium, where they encounter a hooded man. He threatens them at first, but after discovering he and Alpha share similar views on the walkers, allows them to stay the night.

To keep their anonymity, she refers to herself as "A" and him as "B". Attempting to become more brave to be like her mother, Lydia covers herself with walker blood and wanders off to practice walking among the dead while Alpha is asleep. Alpha wakes up and immediately begins looking for Lydia. B discovers Alpha in the room, and as they talk a walker suddenly enters, which Alpha quickly destroys. As B attempts to kill Alpha in a rage, they are interrupted by Lydia, who attempts to convince B to follow Alpha's path. B collapses by the walker's body in remorse; Alpha, recognizing that the walker must have been someone important to B, offers to take the skin off the walker and give it to B as a mask to wear.

In the present, Alpha orders Beta to lead a team of Whisperers to gather a herd of walkers. Among the team is Frances, the mother of the baby that was abandoned outside of Hilltop, as well as Frances' sister. After gathering walkers, Frances hallucinates hearing a baby crying nearby and panics, causing the walkers to turn on them. Beta is able to kill the walkers, but assures Frances that there will be consequences, and they return to their camp. Upon returning, Frances is taken to a secluded area to meet with Alpha; expecting punishment, Frances cries and repents, promising to never show weakness again. Alpha decides to spare her of punishment, causing Beta, who was expecting Frances to be executed, to begin questioning Alpha's leadership. She justifies sparing Frances by saying she understands the loss of a child, falsely claiming to have killed Lydia during their last encounter.

The Whisperers continue their attempts at gathering more walkers, until a distant explosion caused by a crashing satellite scatters them. While attempting to re-group the scattered walkers, Frances sees a walker with a baby carrier, reminding her that Alpha had ordered her to bring her son to Hilltop. With newfound anger towards Alpha, Frances jumps onto Alpha's back and starts screaming, attracting the horde toward them. Frances' sister drags Alpha to safety and pushes Frances into the herd of walkers, killing her. This impresses Alpha, who thanks her for her sacrifice and later grants her the title of Gamma. The following morning, Alpha leaves the rest of the Whisperers and heads to the site of one of their old camps; Beta secretly follows her and discovers that she has set up a small shrine to Lydia. When he demands an explanation, Alpha breaks down into tears and admits that Lydia is still alive. Alpha is ashamed at having shown weakness, but Beta promises to keep her secrets from the rest of the Whisperers. Alpha then destroys the shrine and asserts they will soon attack the communities, which Beta had been requesting ever since their last conflict. She then repeats the Whisperers' code together with Beta. Later, she spots Carol from across a ravine.

== Production ==
This episode marks the first appearance of Thora Birch as Gamma, a member of the Whisperers. Her casting was first announced in July 2019.

== Reception ==
=== Critical reception ===
"We Are the End of the World" received critical acclaim from critics. On Rotten Tomatoes, the episode has an approval rating of 94% with an average score of 7.4 out of 10, based on 17 reviews. The site's critical consensus reads, "While heavy on flashbacks, 'We Are the End of the World' unveils a dark, thoughtfully constructed exploration of the Whisperer's origins."

Ron Hogan of Den of Geek gave the episode 4 out of 5 stars, writing that, "The Walking Dead hasn’t always done a good job of making villains well-rounded characters, but with the Whisperers, Angela Kang and company is doing a solid job of turning what would otherwise be a group of masked psychopaths into a Shakespearian drama company of back-stabbers and schemers." Hogan praised Nicotero's direction and how the two storylines of flashback and present were matched together.

Erik Kain of Forbes praised the episode as a "very strong character-building episode for our new villains". He further said of the episode that, "This show has become so much better in the past two seasons, and this is yet another great example of Angela Kang’s leadership totally transforming The Walking Dead into truly captivating television once again." Jeff Stone of IndieWire gave the episode a C+, writing that, "Those hoping for the season to gain a little more narrative momentum after last week’s pokey premiere will be disappointed."

Alex McLevy for The A.V. Club gave the episode a B, feeling that the flashbacks and backstory were unnecessary but that Samantha Morton's performance was excellent.

=== Ratings ===
"We Are the End of the World" drew 3.47 million viewers and was the second most watched cable show of the night, and was the most watched non-sports broadcast.
