= Reaper (comics) =

Reaper, in comics, may refer to:

- Reaper (Marvel Comics):
  - Reaper (Pantu Hurageb), a Marvel Comics character who has appeared in X-Force
  - Reaper (Gunther Strauss), a Marvel Comics fictional Nazi spy
  - Reaper (Louis Dawson), a Marvel Comics character, SWAT team member who became the masked Reaper
- Reaper (DC Comics), a number of DC Comics characters

== See also ==
- Grim Reaper (Marvel Comics)
- Reaper (disambiguation)
