= Grim Reaper (film) =

- DVD cover
- Directed by: Michael Feifer
- Written by: Ellis Walker
- Produced by: Michael Feifer
- Starring: Adam Fortin; Cherish Lee; Brent Fidler; Benjamin Pitts
- Cinematography: Jeffrey D. Smith
- Edited by: Adam Severin
- Music by: Dennis Smith
- Production company: MRG Entertainment
- Distributed by: DeA Planeta Home Entertainment; MRG Entertainment; Maple Pictures
- Release dates: January 16, 2007 (US); April 18, 2007 (Spain); November 12, 2007 (Japan)
- Running time: 82 minutes
- Country: United States
- Language: English
- Budget: $1,000,000 (estimated)

Grim Reaper is a 2007 slasher film directed by Michael Feifer, which stars Cherish Lee, Brent Fidler, Benjamin Pitts, and Adam Fortin as the title character.

== Plot ==
Stripper Rachel is hit by a cab but survives in the emergency room of a hospital. However, she sees Death chasing her, but she does not succeed in convincing the nurses. She is drugged and wakes up in St. Joseph, a mental hospital administrated by Dr. Brown. She finds five other inmates that had a near death experience and also claim that Death is coming for them, but Dr. Brown tells them that they are subject of a mass hypnosis experiment. Meanwhile, Rachel's boyfriend and student of medicine Liam seeks her nearby the night-club. While trying to escape from the facility, Rachel discloses the truth about Dr. Brown and St. Joseph.

== Cast ==
- Cherish Lee as Rachel
- Brent Fidler as Dr. Brown
- Benjamin Pitts as Liam
- Adam Fortin as the Grim Reaper
- Nick Mathis as Nick
- Rebekah Brandes as Katie
- Turiya Dawn as Tia
- Peter Bisson as Pete
- Mike Korich as Stuart
- James C. Burns as Homeless Man
- Caia Coley as Karen
- Jay Wilkins as Paramedic
- Serdar Kalsin as Cab Driver
- Alice Ensor as Nurse Hill
- J.D. Head as Bubba

== Release ==
The film was released direct-to-video in Canada and the United States on January 16, 2007, by Maple Pictures and Lionsgate respectively.

== Reception ==
Critical reception for the film has been negative.

Christopher Armstead from Film Critics United.com gave the film a negative review criticizing the film's poor execution, calling it "dull" and 'slow moving'.

Rick L. Blalock from Terror Hook.com awarded the film a score of 2 / 10 stating, "Well, I can't say I am surprised by how much I didn't like this film - I kind of expected it but was hoping for the best. This film to be honest is one slasher film I found myself bored with rather quickly".

Absolute Horror awarded the film a score of 2 / 4, stating, "Sadly, what really might have saved GRIM REAPER and its vaguely original idea was some good execution, something in very short supply here".
