= Don't Fear the Reaper (disambiguation) =

"(Don't Fear) The Reaper" is a 1976 song by American rock band Blue Öyster Cult.

Don't Fear the Reaper may also refer to:

== Music ==
- Don't Fear the Reaper (EP), by Clint Ruin and Lydia Lunch, 1991
- Don't Fear the Reaper (album), by Witchery, 2006

== Other uses ==
- "Don't Fear the Reaper", 91st episode of Yu-Gi-Oh! GX
- Don't Fear the Reaper (novel), 2023 novel by Stephen Graham Jones

== See also ==
- "Don't Fear the Roofer", a season sixteen episode of The Simpsons
