= The Walking Dead season 10 =

Season of television series

The Walking Dead
- Season 10
- Promotional poster art featuring characters Michonne, Daryl Dixon and Carol Peletier
- Showrunner: Angela Kang
- Starring: Norman Reedus; Danai Gurira; Melissa McBride; Christian Serratos; Josh McDermitt; Seth Gilliam; Ross Marquand; Khary Payton; Ryan Hurst; Samantha Morton; Jeffrey Dean Morgan; Lauren Cohan; Callan McAuliffe; Avi Nash; Eleanor Matsuura; Cooper Andrews; Nadia Hilker; Cailey Fleming; Cassady McClincy; Lauren Ridloff
- No. of episodes: 22

Release
- Original network: AMC
- Original release: October 6, 2019 – April 4, 2021

Season chronology
- ← Previous; Season 9 Next → Season 11

The tenth season of The Walking Dead, an American post-apocalyptic horror television series on AMC, premiered on October 6, 2019, and concluded on April 4, 2021, consisting of 22 episodes. Developed for television by Frank Darabont, the series is based on the eponymous series of comic books by Robert Kirkman, Tony Moore, and Charlie Adlard. The executive producers are Kirkman, David Alpert, Scott M. Gimple, Angela Kang, Greg Nicotero, Joseph Incaprera, Denise Huth, and Gale Anne Hurd, with Kang as showrunner for the second consecutive season. The tenth season received generally positive reviews. It was nominated for multiple awards, including a fifth consecutive nomination for Best Horror Television Series, at the 46th Saturn Awards.

This season adapts material from issues #145–174 of the comic book series and focuses on the group's preparation and war against the Whisperers. Set several months after the massacre perpetrated by Alpha (Samantha Morton) during the community fair, the season focuses on the united communities as they initiate a fight in order to end the threat of the Whisperers.

The tenth season is the final season for series regular Danai Gurira, who has portrayed Michonne since the third season. The planned season finale was scheduled to air on April 12, 2020, but post-production was delayed due to the COVID-19 pandemic. Instead, the episode aired on October 4, 2020, with an additional six episodes added to the tenth season that were broadcast from February 28 to April 4, 2021.

== Cast ==
=== Main cast ===
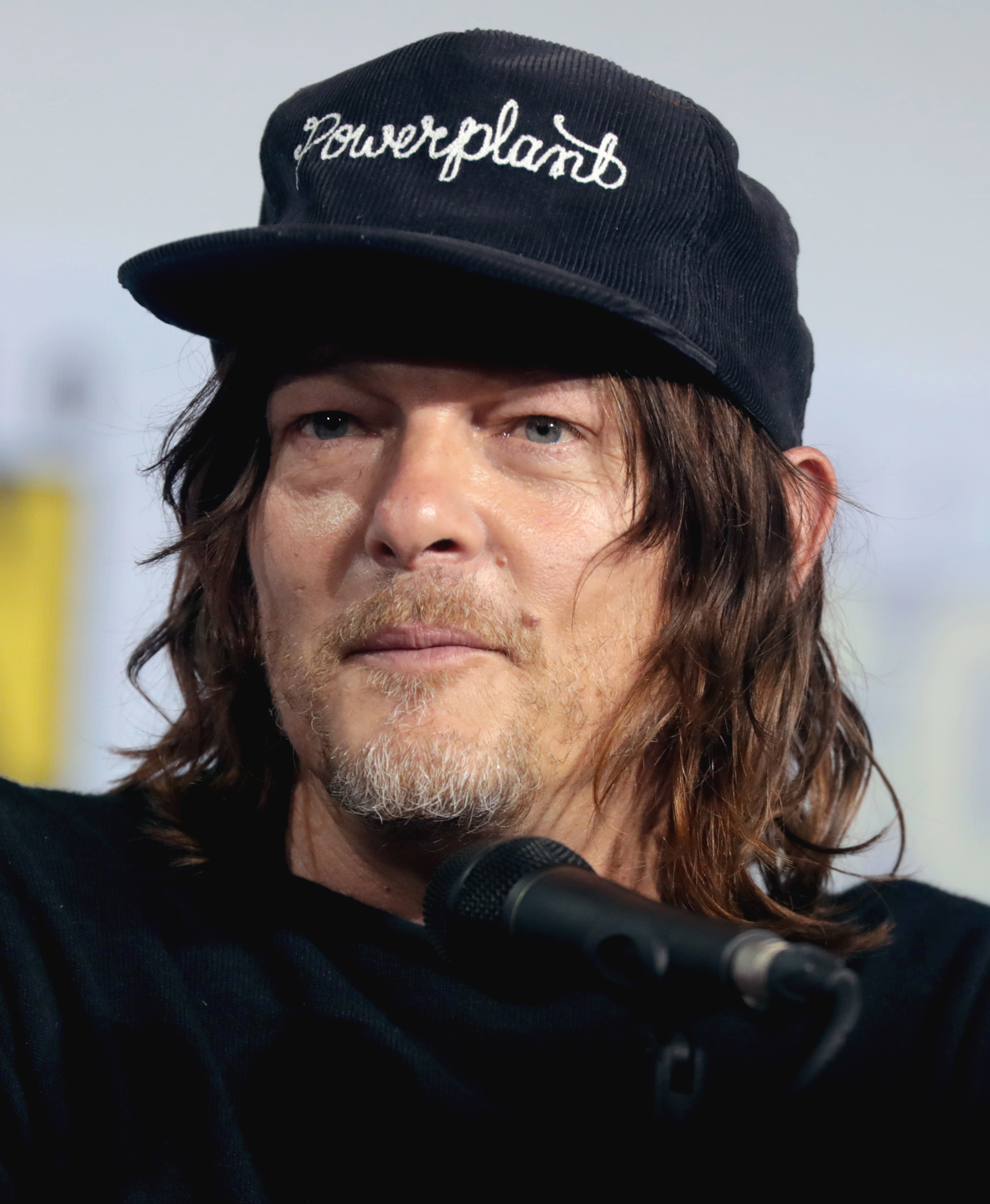
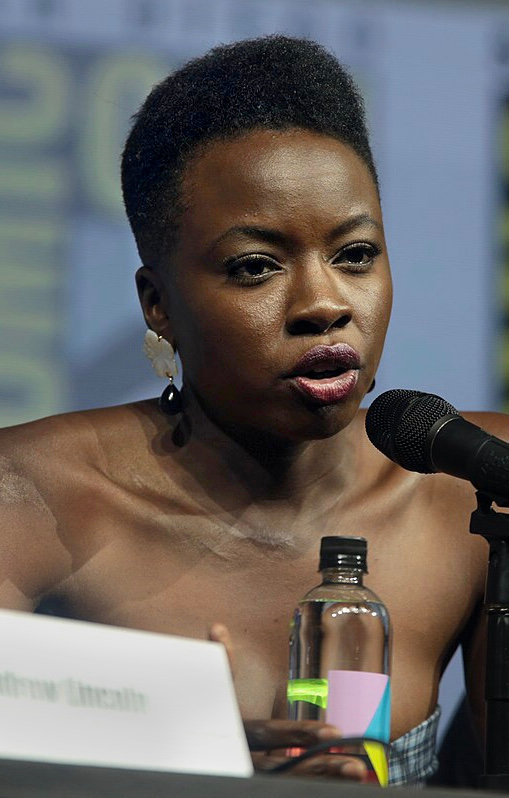
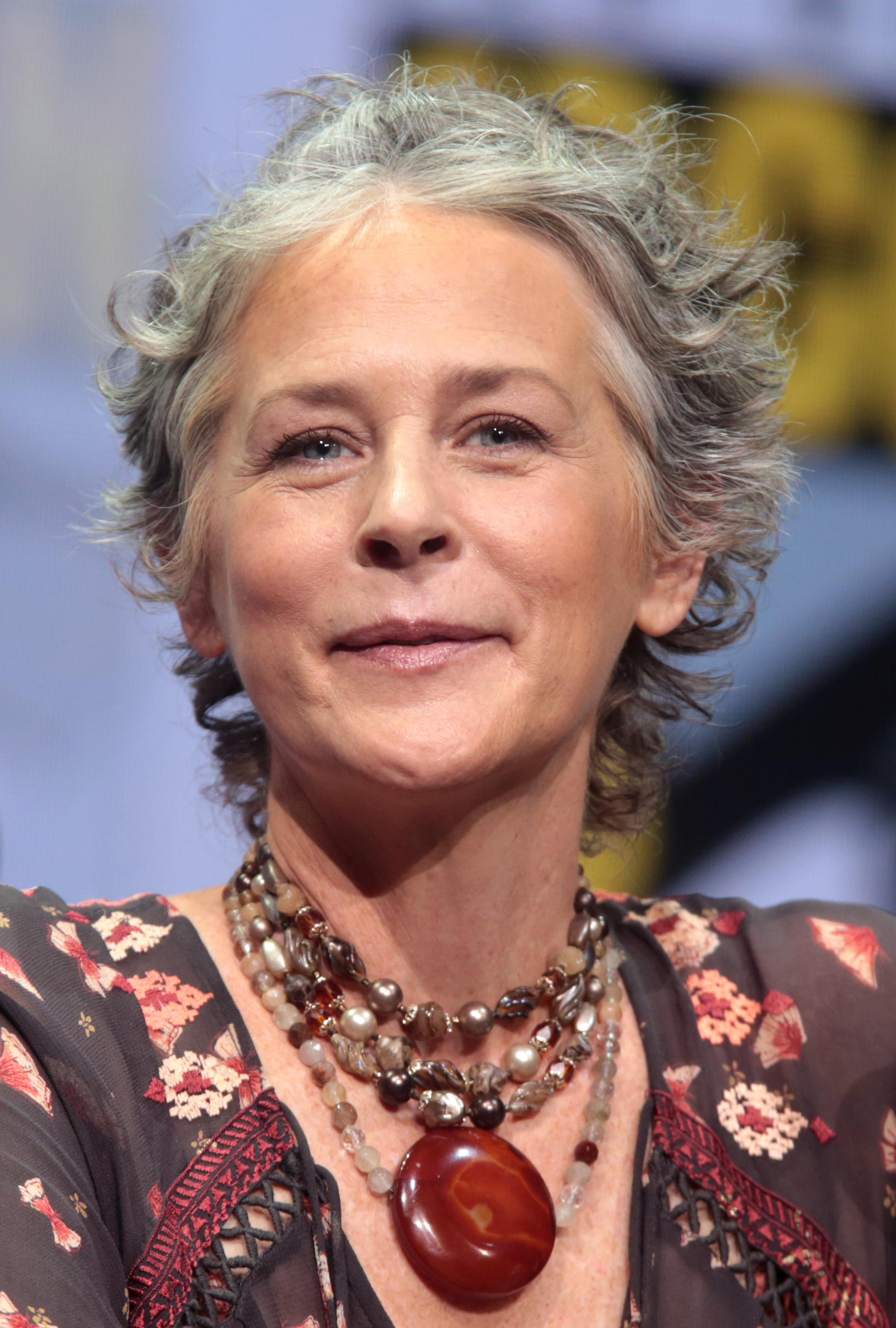
Norman Reedus (Daryl Dixon), Danai Gurira (Michonne), and Melissa McBride (Carol Peletier)
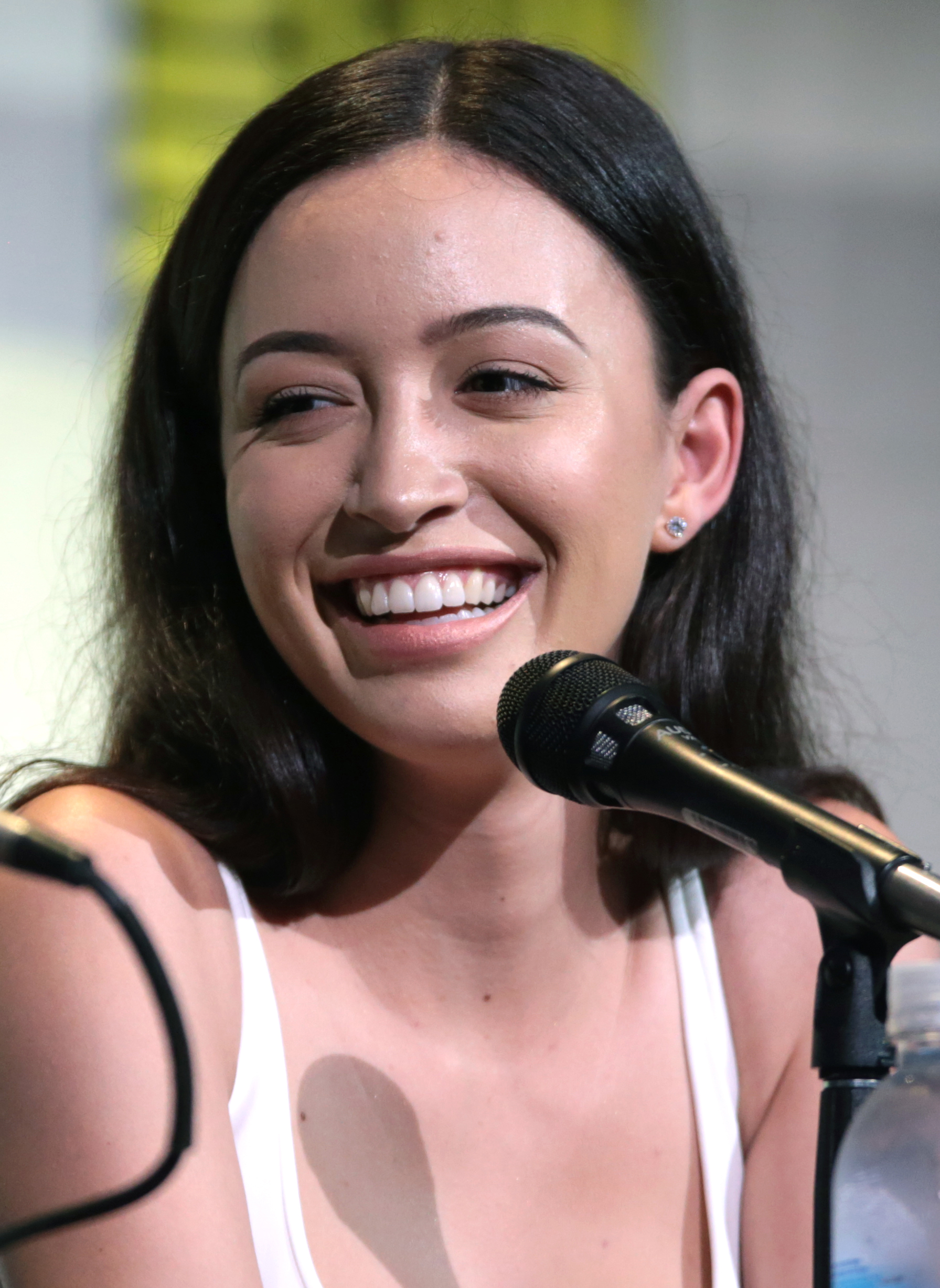
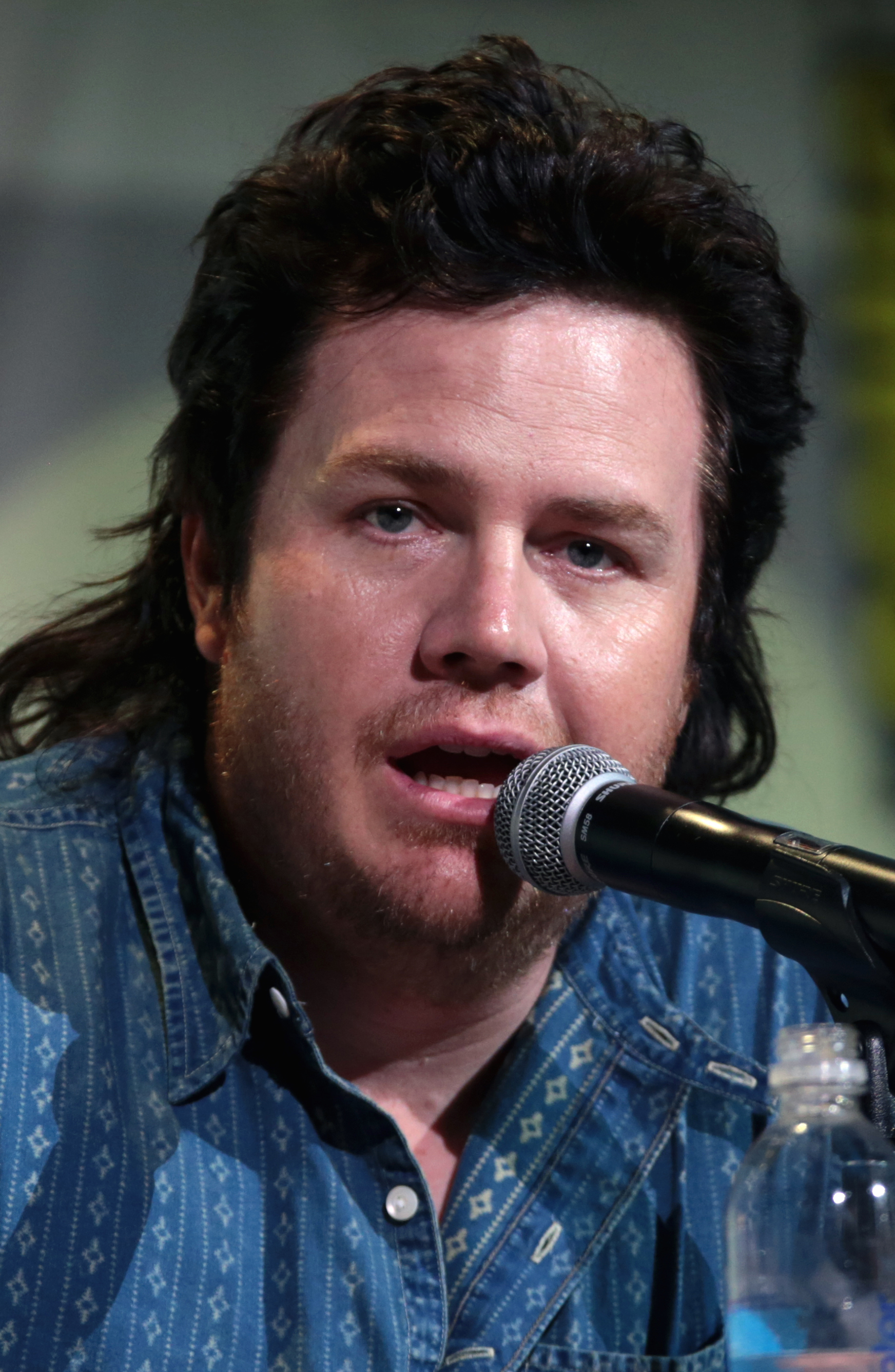
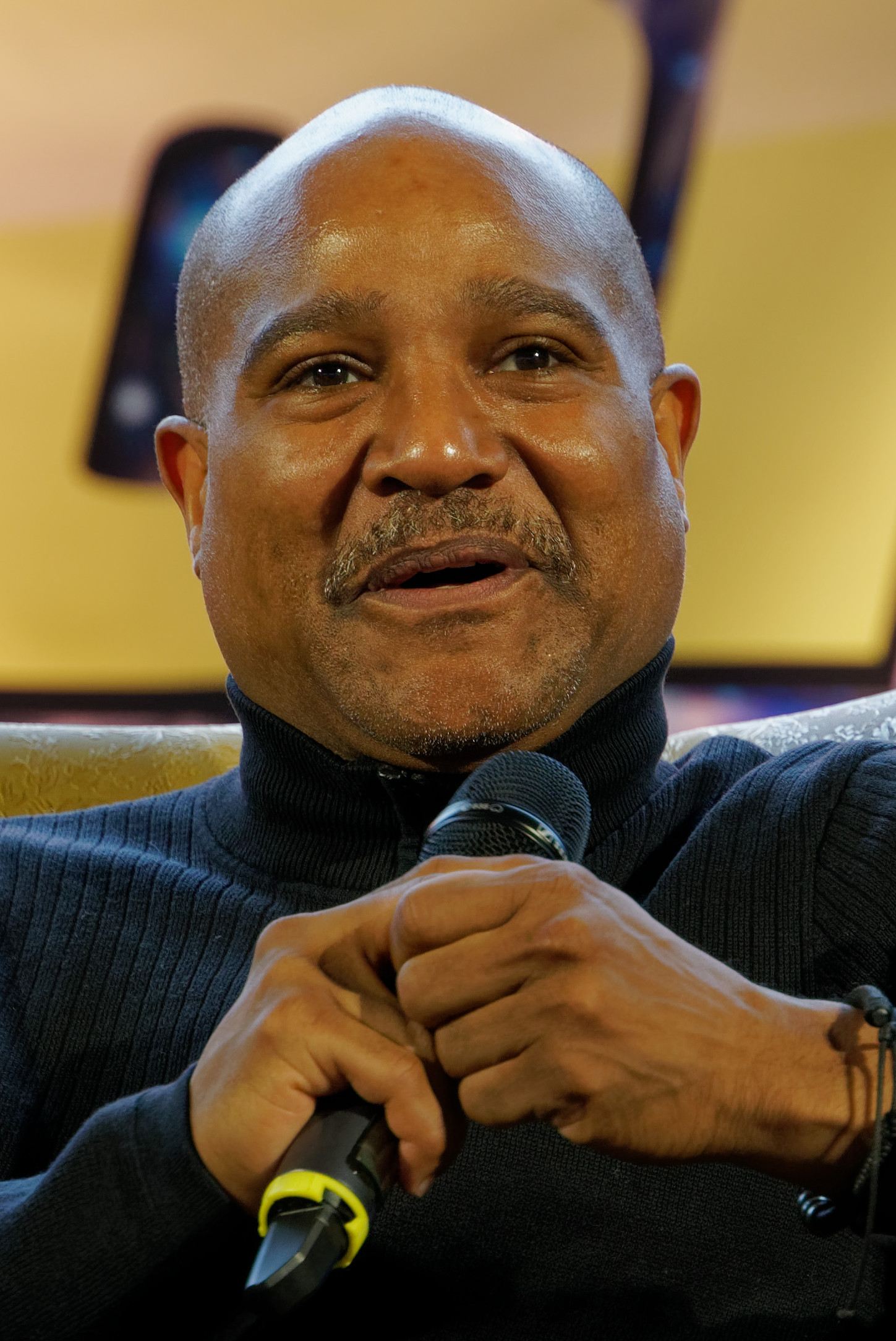
Christian Serratos (Rosita Espinosa), Josh McDermitt (Eugene Porter), and Seth Gilliam (Gabriel Stokes)
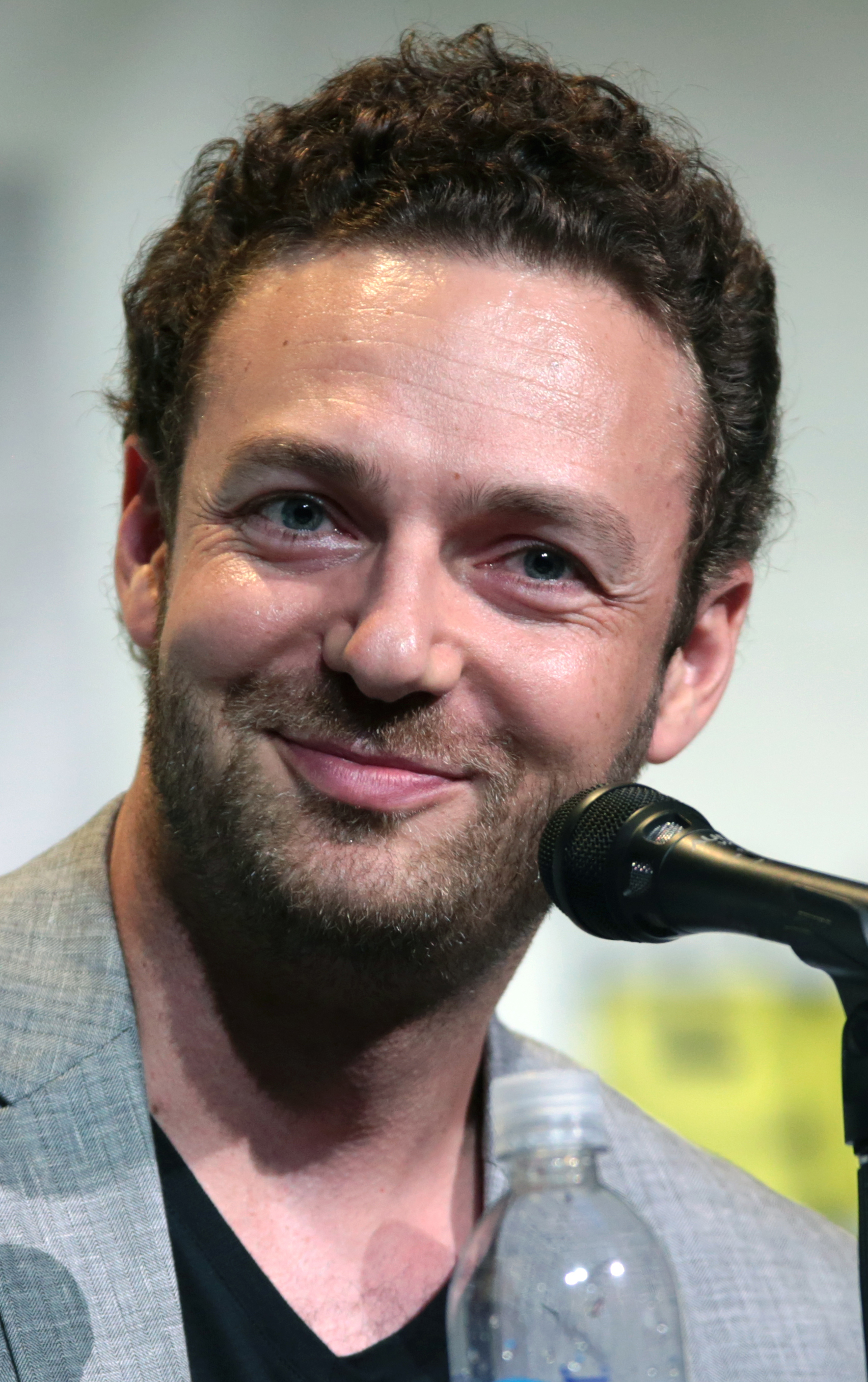
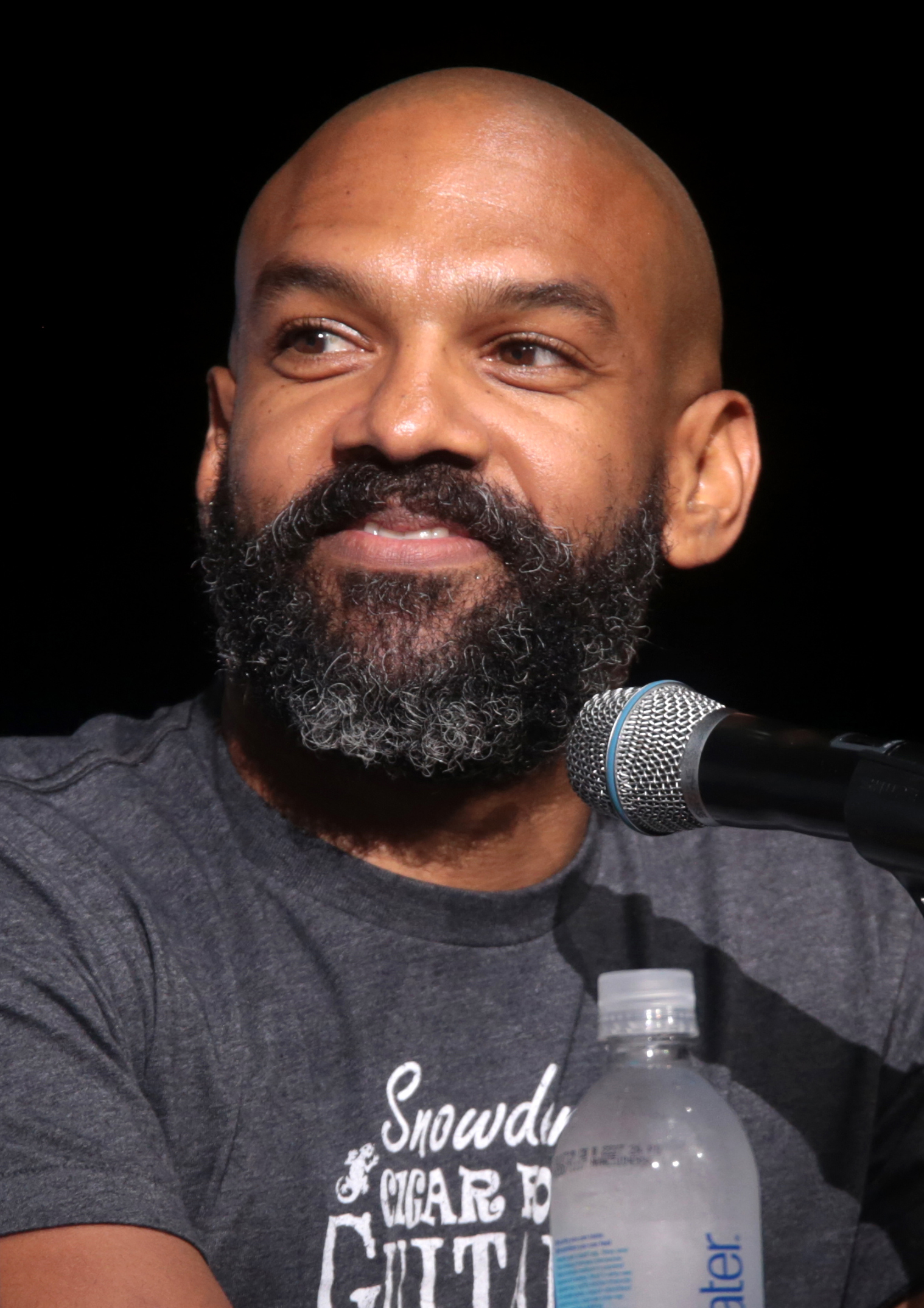
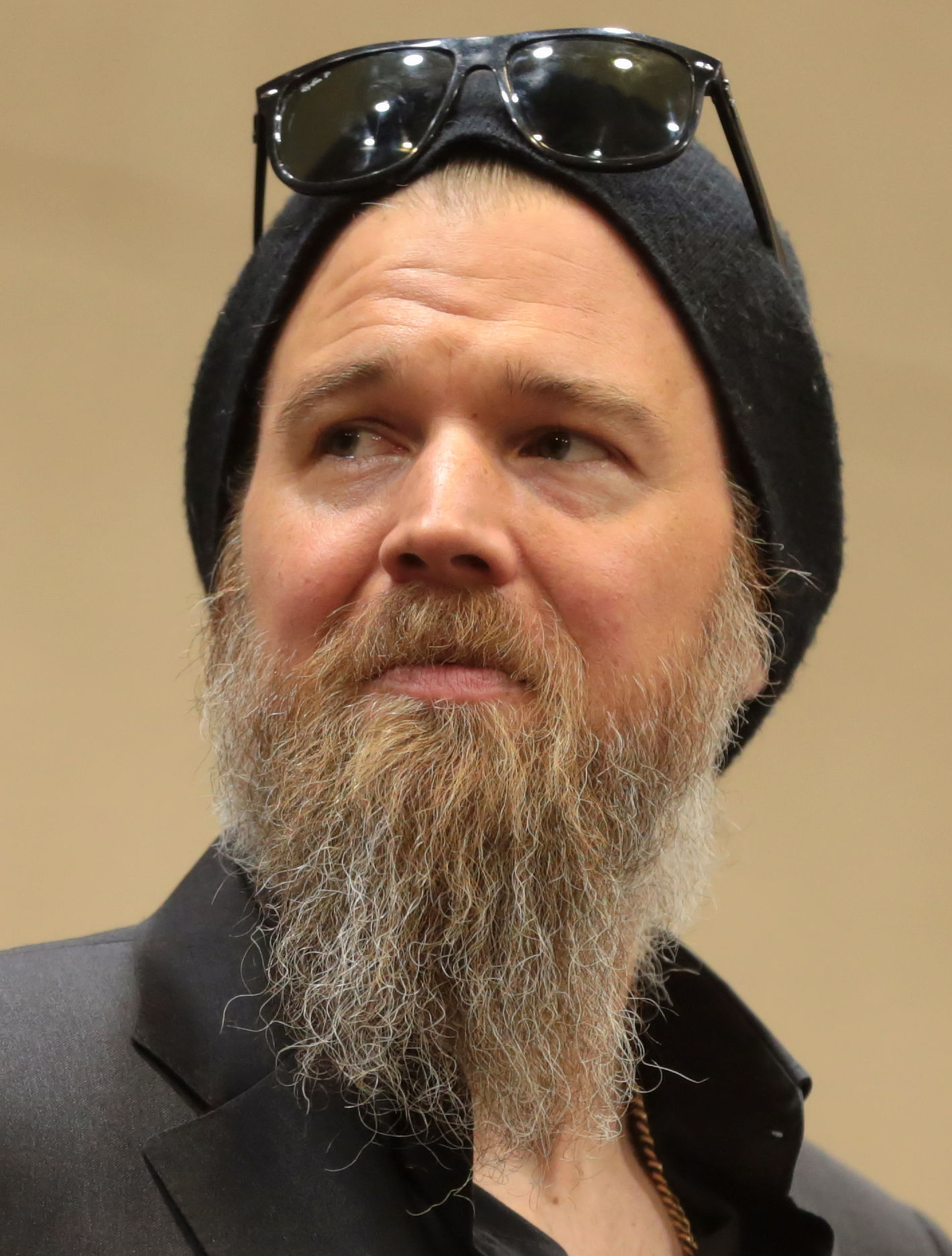
Ross Marquand (Aaron), Khary Payton (Ezekiel), and Ryan Hurst (Beta)
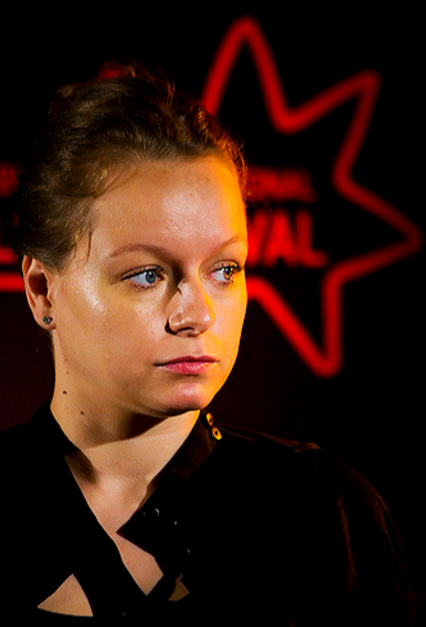
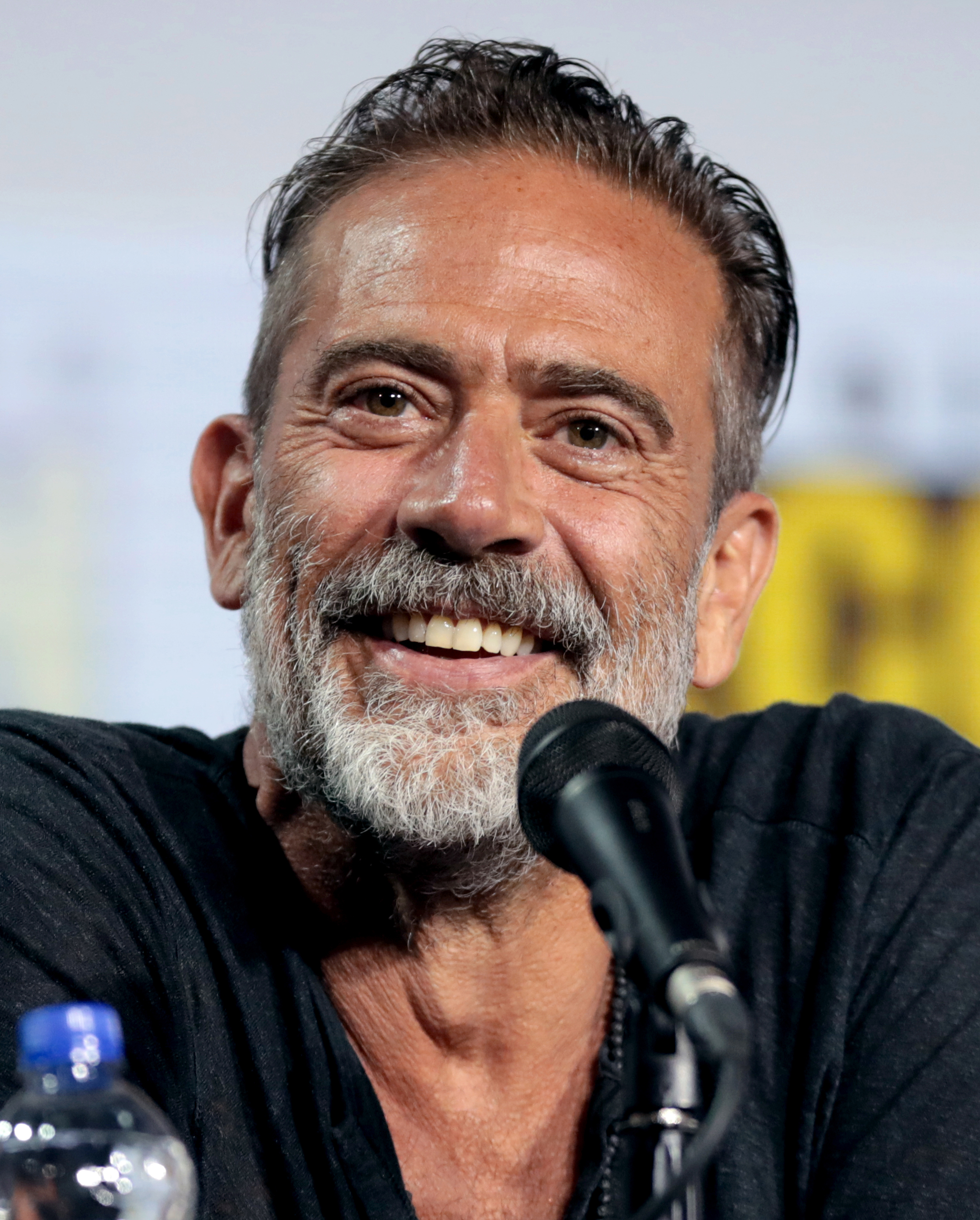
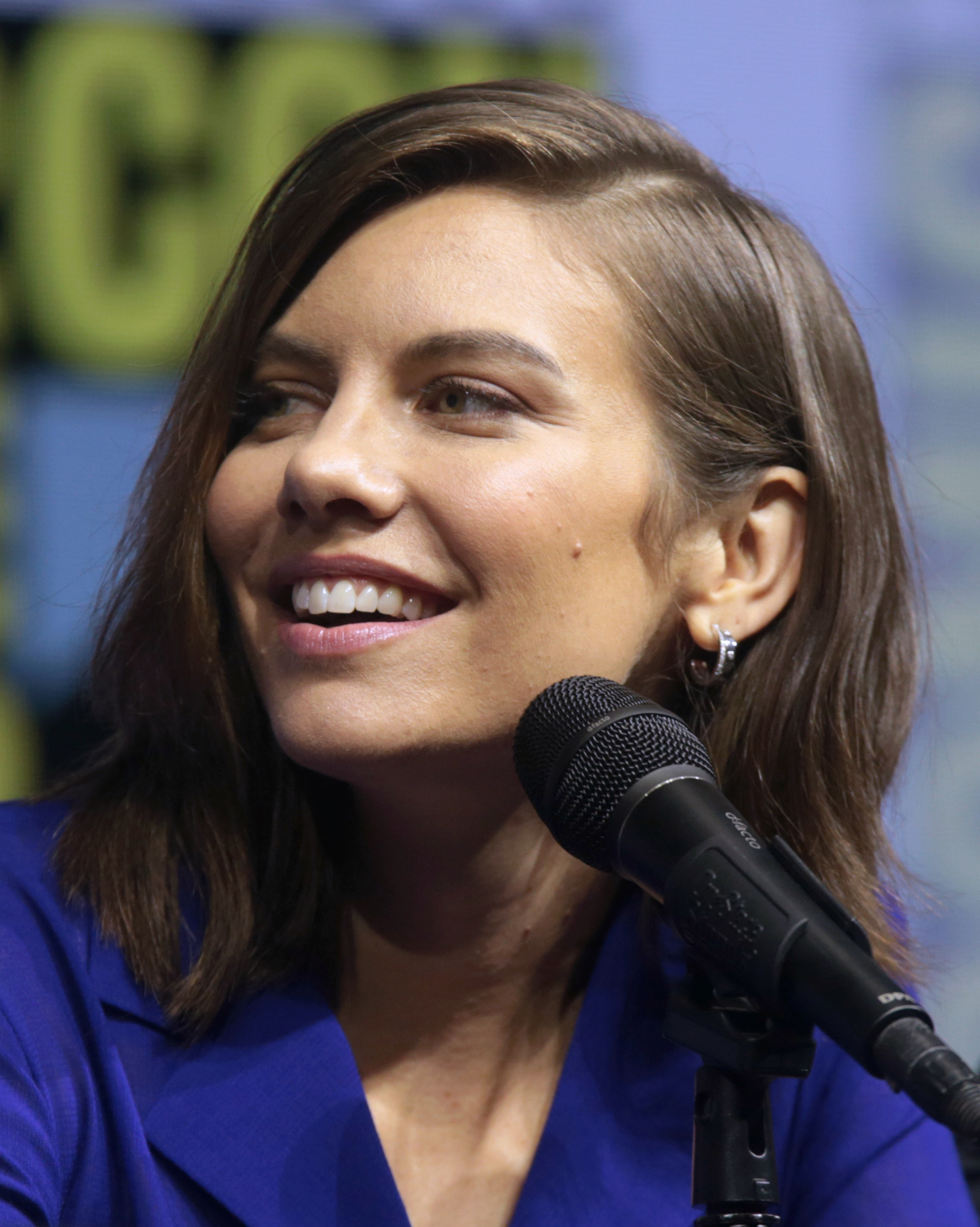
Samantha Morton (Alpha), Jeffrey Dean Morgan (Negan), and Lauren Cohan (Maggie Greene)
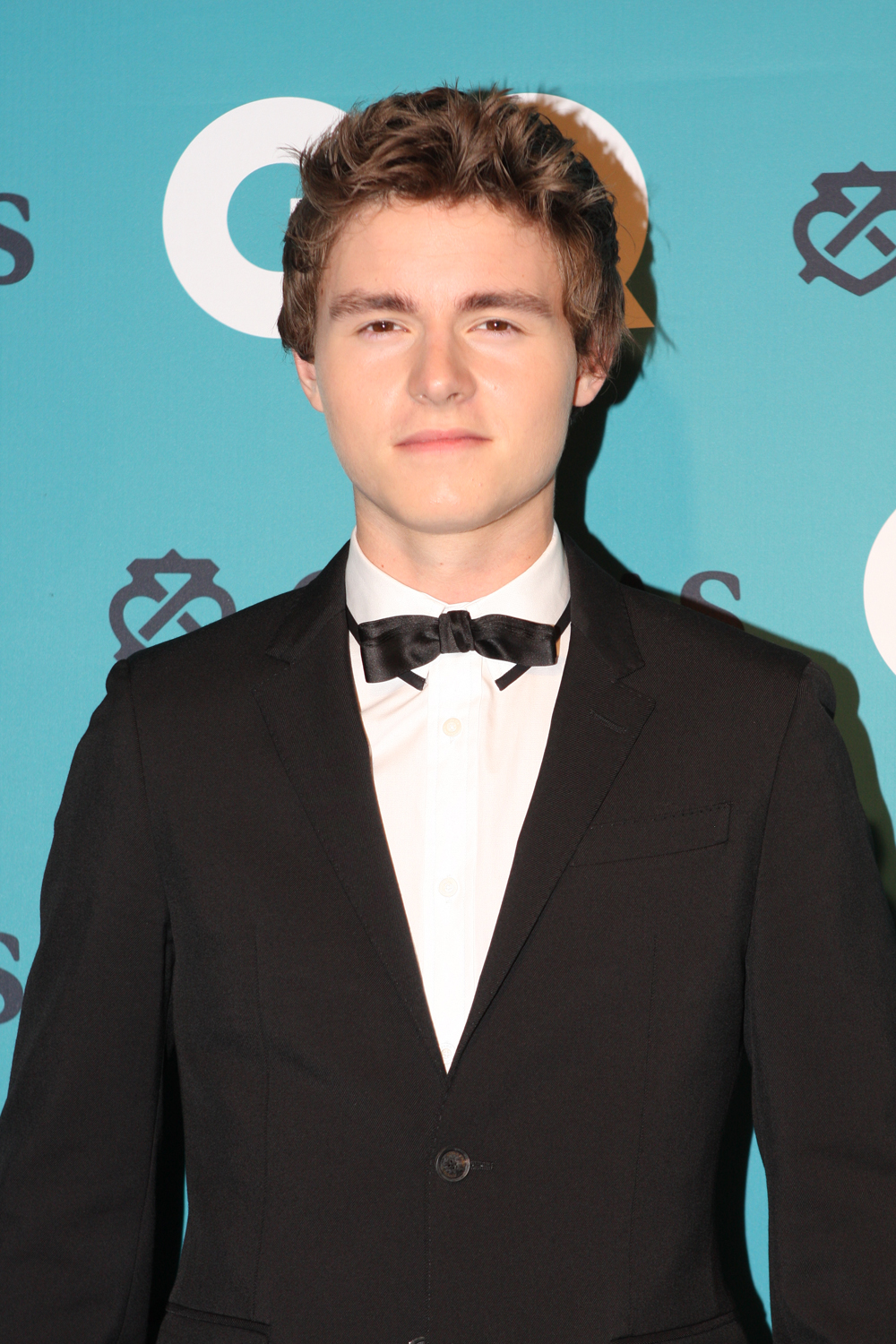
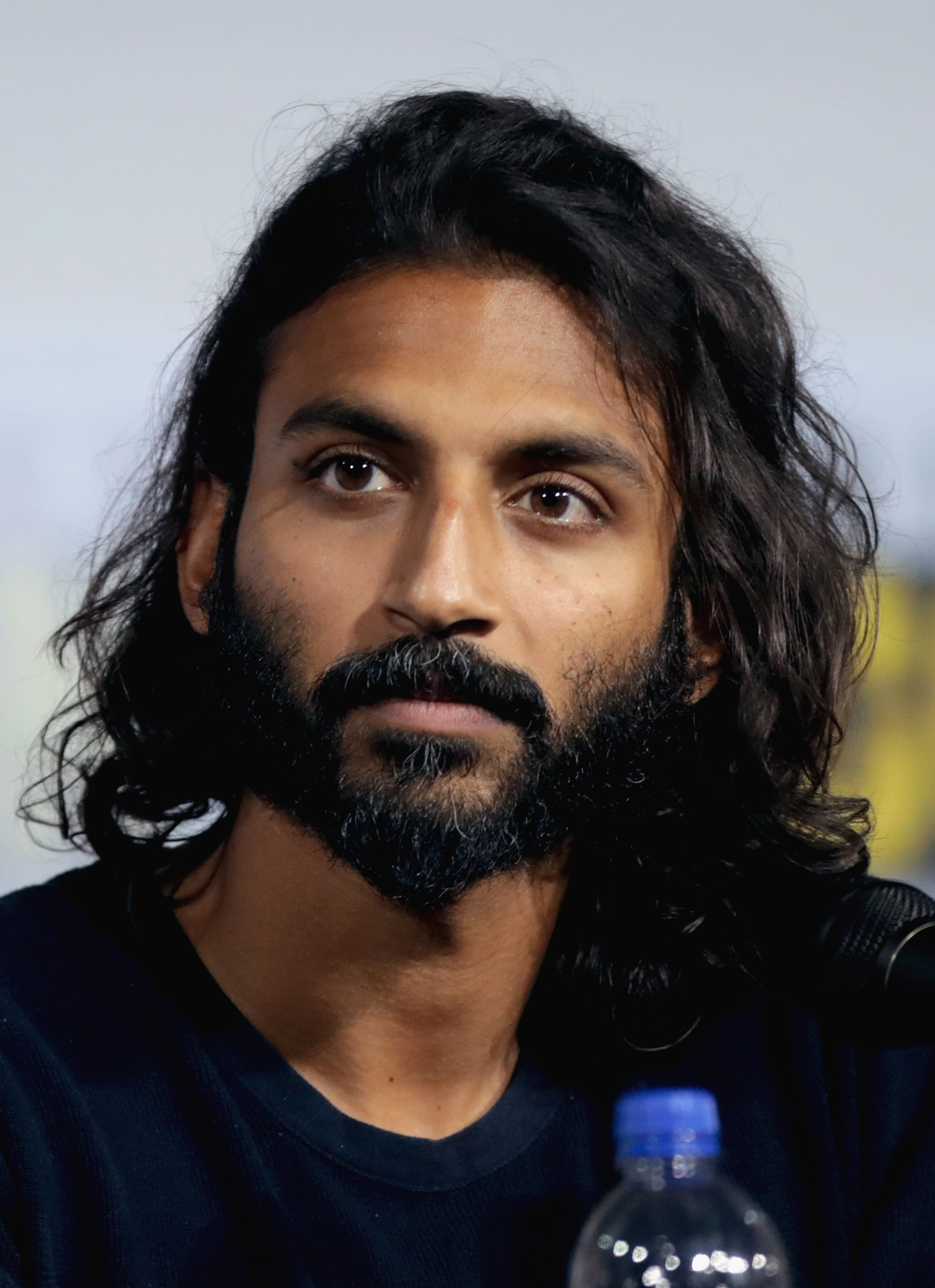
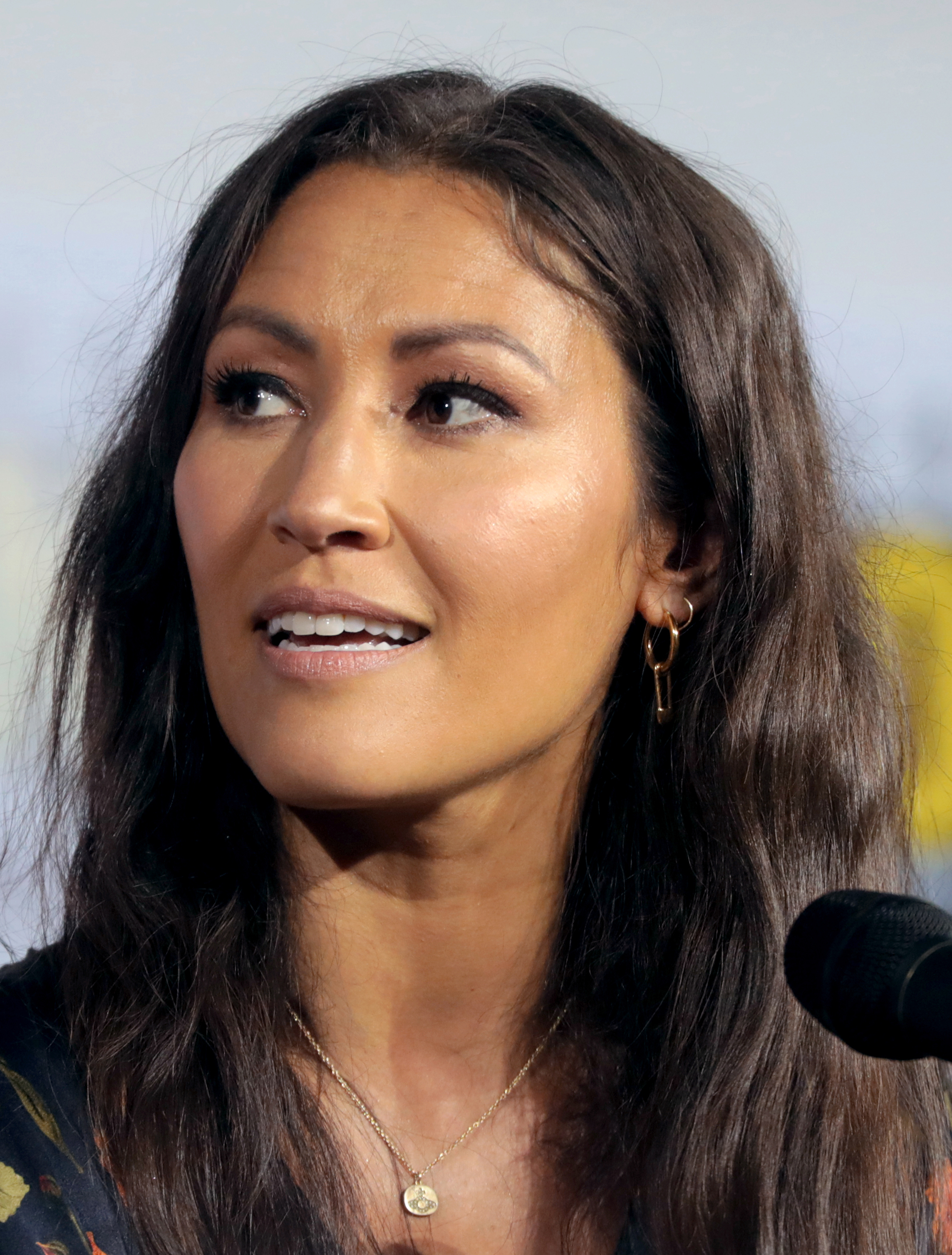
Callan McAuliffe (Alden), Avi Nash (Siddiq), and Eleanor Matsuura (Yumiko)
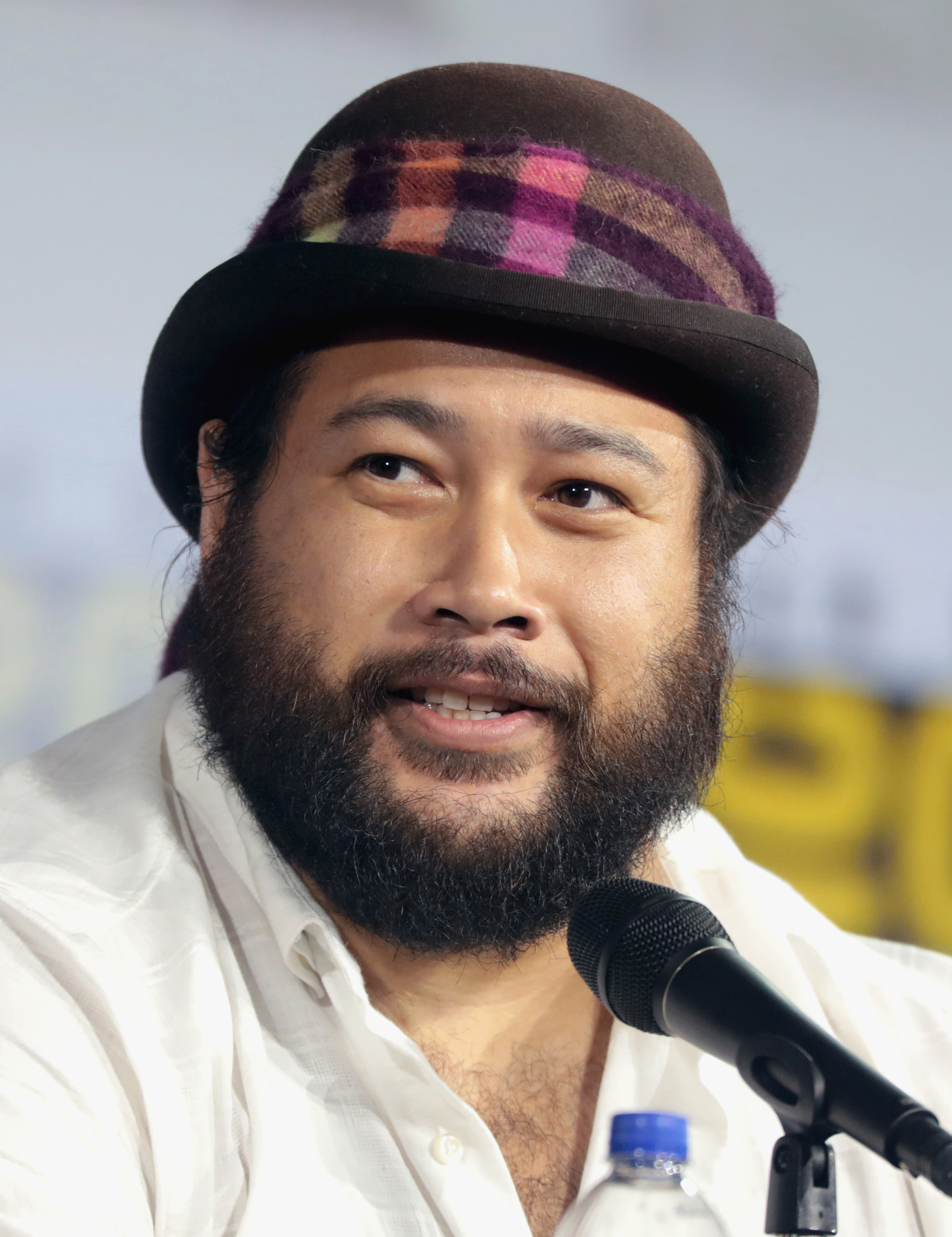
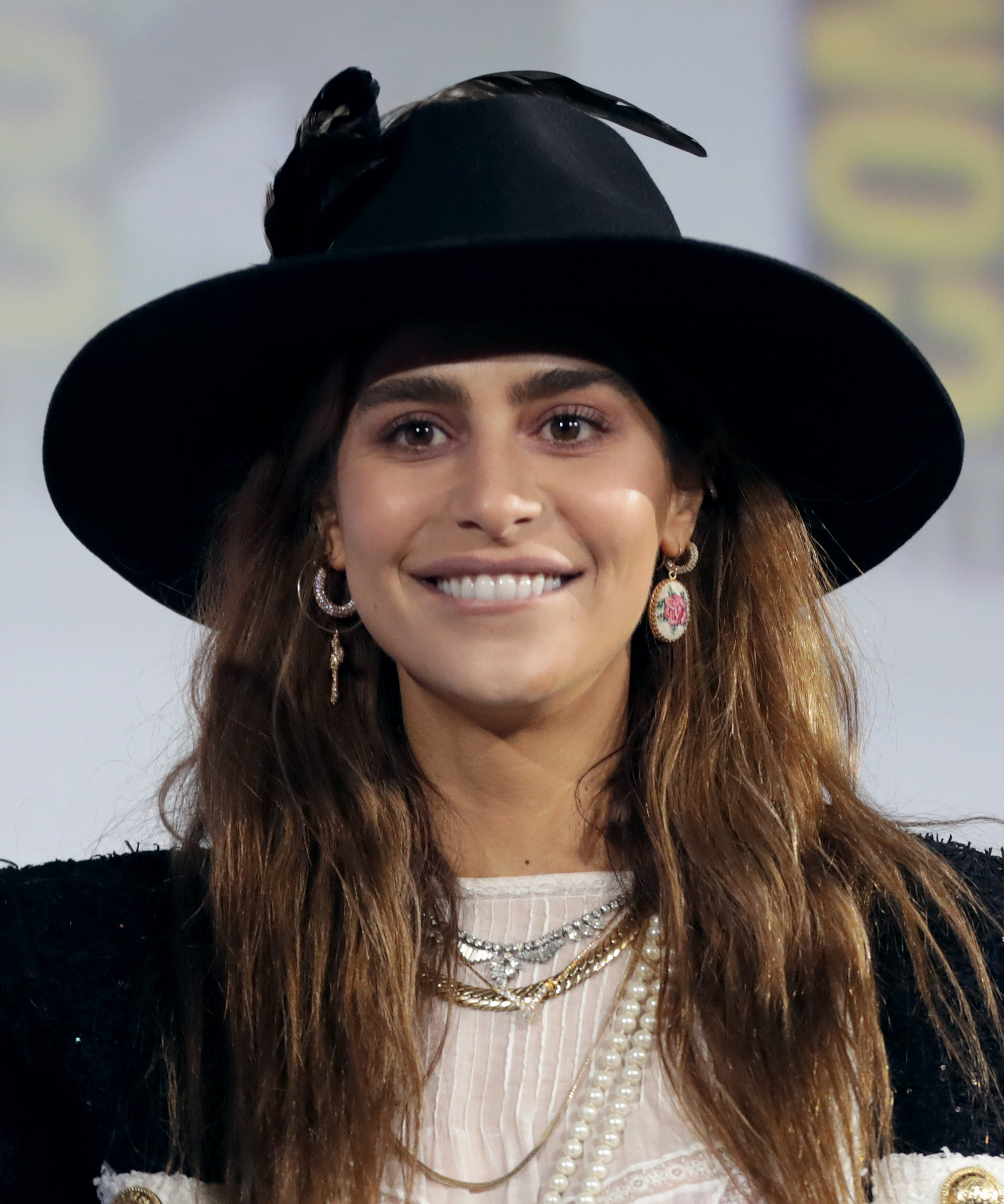
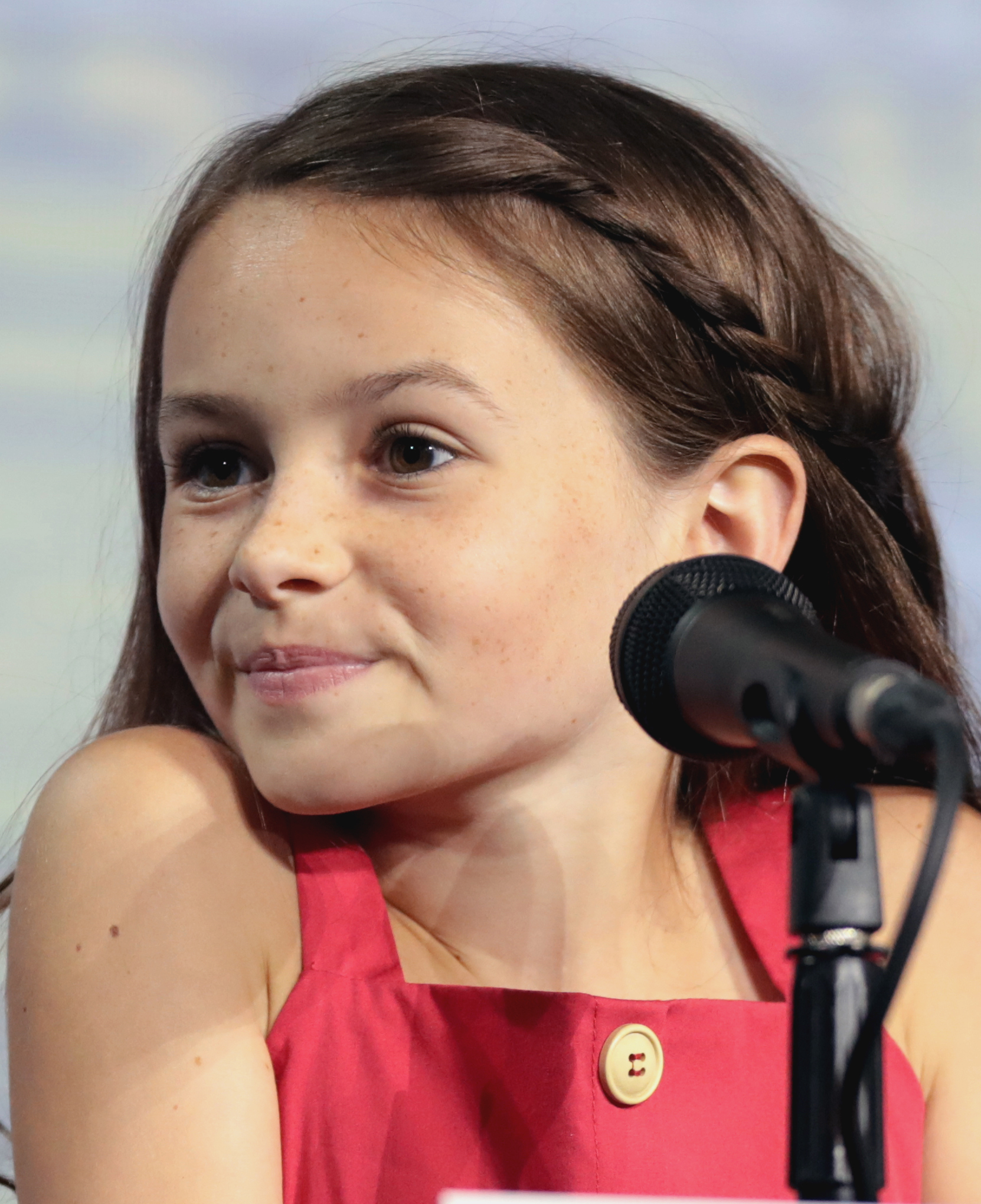
Cooper Andrews (Jerry), Nadia Hilker (Magna), and Cailey Fleming (Judith Grimes)

The tenth season features twenty series regulars overall. Ryan Hurst, Eleanor Matsuura, Cooper Andrews, Nadia Hilker, Cailey Fleming, Cassady McClincy, and Lauren Ridloff were all promoted to series regular status, after previously having recurring roles. Hurst is added to the opening credits, while the rest are credited as "also starring". Beginning with episode 17, Lauren Cohan was re-added to the opening credits and as a series regular.

==== Starring ====
- Norman Reedus as Daryl Dixon, a southerner and Rick's former right-hand man. He is a skilled hunter and former recruiter for Alexandria.
- Danai Gurira as Michonne, a katana-wielding warrior and Rick's former romantic partner. She is also adoptive mother to Judith, and mother to her and Rick's child.
- Melissa McBride as Carol Peletier, a survivor who has overcome several traumas, is a skilled and ingenious fighter, and now resides at Alexandria. She is also ex-wife to Ezekiel.
- Christian Serratos as Rosita Espinosa, a pragmatic member of the group who is mother to her and Siddiq's child. She is also in a relationship with Gabriel.
- Josh McDermitt as Eugene Porter, an intelligent survivor who has overcome his fear of walkers. He also fell in love with Rosita.
- Seth Gilliam as Gabriel Stokes, a priest and head of the council of Alexandria who has reconciled his beliefs with what needs to be done to survive. He is also in a relationship with Rosita.
- Ross Marquand as Aaron, a former recruiter from Alexandria who lost his arm in an accident and adoptive father to Gracie.
- Khary Payton as Ezekiel, the charismatic former leader of the Kingdom and ex-husband to Carol.
- Ryan Hurst as Beta, the second-in-command of the Whisperers and the secondary antagonist of the season.
- Samantha Morton as Alpha, the leader of the Whisperers, a mysterious group of survivors who wear the skins of walkers to mask their presence and the main antagonist of the season.
- Jeffrey Dean Morgan as Negan, the reformed former leader of the Saviors who is incarcerated at Alexandria. He formed a parental bond with Michonne's adoptive daughter, Judith.
- Lauren Cohan as Maggie Greene, Glenn's widow and the former leader of the Hilltop, who left with Georgie and is helping with a new distant community. She also has a grudge against Negan for killing her husband.

==== Also starring ====
- Callan McAuliffe as Alden, a former member of the Saviors who resides at the Hilltop and now vows a retaliation against the Whisperers. He had been in a relationship with Enid, who was killed by Alpha.
- Avi Nash as Siddiq, a doctor for Alexandria who is the father to his and Rosita's child. He is suffering from PTSD due to being a key witness to Alpha's killings of several members of his group.
- Eleanor Matsuura as Yumiko, Magna's girlfriend who is a proficient archer and former criminal defense lawyer before the apocalypse.
- Cooper Andrews as Jerry, a former resident of the Kingdom and Ezekiel's right-hand man who is in a relationship with Nabila.
- Nadia Hilker as Magna, the feisty former leader of a small group of roaming survivors.
- Cailey Fleming as Judith Grimes, the daughter of Lori Grimes and Shane Walsh, and adopted daughter of Rick and Michonne.
- Cassady McClincy as Lydia, Alpha's daughter and former Whisperer who now resides in Alexandria. She is also Henry's former love interest.
  - Havana Blum as young Lydia
- Lauren Ridloff as Connie, a deaf former member of Magna's group who forms a close bond with Daryl.

=== Supporting cast ===
==== Alexandria Safe-Zone ====
- Lindsley Register as Laura, a former lieutenant of the Saviors who is a member of the council of Alexandria.
- Kenric Green as Scott, a supply runner in Alexandria.
- Mandi Christine Kerr as Barbara, a resident of Alexandria.
- Tamara Austin as Nora, a member of the council of Alexandria and Michonne's friend.
- Anabelle Holloway as Gracie, the adoptive daughter of Aaron.
- Antony Azor as Rick "R.J." Grimes Jr., the son of Rick and Michonne.
- Jerri Tubbs as Margo, a former member of the Highwaymen who resents Lydia.
- David Shae as Alfred, a former member of the Highwaymen and Margo's friend.
- Blaine Kern III as Brandon, a prison guard in Alexandria who watches over Negan.

==== The Hilltop ====
- Nadine Marissa as Nabila, a former resident and gardener of the Kingdom, and Jerry's wife.
- Dan Fogler as Luke, a former music teacher who has come to appreciate safety in numbers.
- Angel Theory as Kelly, Connie's alert and protective sister who has a gradual hearing loss.
- John Finn as Earl Sutton, the Hilltop's blacksmith and former husband to Tammy.
- Kerry Cahill as Dianne, one of Ezekiel's top soldiers and a skilled archer.
- Karen Ceesay as Bertie, a teacher at the Hilltop.
- Gustavo Gomez as Marco, a supply runner of the Hilltop.
- Anthony Lopez as Oscar, a resident of the Hilltop.
- Jackson Pace as Gage, a resident of the Hilltop who now resents Lydia over the deaths of his friends.

==== Oceanside ====
- Sydney Park as Cyndie, a young woman who is the leader of the Oceanside community.
- Avianna Mynhier as Rachel Ward, a teenage member of Oceanside who represents her community.
- Alex Sgambati as Jules, a member of Oceanside.
- Briana Venskus as Beatrice, one of Oceanside's top soldiers and Cyndie's right-hand.

==== The Whisperers ====
- Thora Birch as Gamma / Mary, a member of the Whisperers who is very protective of Alpha.
- Juan Javier Cardenas as Dante, Siddiq's wise-cracking medical assistant and a spy for the Whisperers.
- Juliet Brett as Frances, a member of the Whisperers and Mary's sister who abandoned her newborn-son under Alpha's orders.
- Mark Sivertsen as Rufus, a member of the Whisperers.

==== Bloodsworth Island ====
- Kevin Carroll as Virgil, a survivor who seeks Michonne's help to look for his family.
- Eve Gordon as Celeste, a resident of Bloodsworth Island, who was a researcher alongside Virgil and Jeremiah.
- Taylor Nichols as Jeremiah, a resident of Bloodsworth Island, who was a researcher alongside Virgil and Celeste.
- Olivia Stambouliah as Lucy, a resident of Bloodsworth Island, who was a janitor in the island's research facility.

==== Survivor Caravan ====
- Breeda Wool as Aiden, a member of a survivor caravan.
- Andrew Bachelor as Bailey, a member of a survivor caravan and Aiden's friend.

==== The Wardens ====
- Okea Eme-Akwari as Elijah, a mysterious and masked member of the Wardens.
- James Devoti as Cole, a trusted member of the Wardens.
- Kien Michael Spiller as Hershel Rhee, the son of Glenn and Maggie.

=== The Commonwealth ===
- Margot Bingham as Max "Stephanie" Mercer, a survivor from an unknown location who communicates with Eugene over the radio.
- Cameron Roberts as Tyler Davis, a soldier of the Commonwealth military.

==== Miscellaneous ====
- Matt Lintz as Henry, the adopted son of Carol and Ezekiel who was killed by Alpha in the ninth season. He appears in Carol's hallucinations.
- Matt Magnum as D.J., a reformed former lieutenant of the Saviors who was killed by Alpha in the ninth season. He appears in Siddiq and Michonne's hallucinations.
- Paola Lázaro as Juanita "Princess" Sanchez, a quirky and flamboyant survivor who has suffered various traumas in her past.
- Lynn Collins as Leah Shaw, the former owner of Dog who formed a loving connection with Daryl.
- Robert Patrick as Mays, a deranged and renegade survivor who lost trust in people.
- Hilarie Burton as Lucille, Negan's late wife who died of pancreatic cancer early in the outbreak. She appears in Negan's flashbacks.
- Miles Mussenden as Franklin, a kind and altruistic doctor who provides medication for Negan's wife. He is also Laura's adoptive father.
- Rodney Rowland as Craven, the antagonistic leader of the motorcycle gang Valak's Vipers.

== Episodes ==
No. overall	No. in season	Title	Directed by	Written by	Original release date	U.S. viewers (millions)
132	1	"Lines We Cross"	Greg Nicotero	Angela Kang	October 6, 2019	4.00
Months after the winter storm, the communities thrive without any signs of the Whisperers, though Michonne insists they respect Alpha's border to avoid conflict. After a Whisperer mask washes ashore at Oceanside and a skin is found in the woods nearby, the groups go on the alert. They observe an old Soviet Union satellite crash to the earth within the Whisperers' boundary; Michonne agrees to send fire-extinguish crews to prevent the fire's spread. Daryl and Carol wander off on their own, where Carol spots Alpha, who is watching her.
133	2	"We Are the End of the World"	Greg Nicotero	Nicole Mirante-Matthews	October 13, 2019	3.47
A Whisperer holds resentment towards Alpha for forcing her to abandon her child; she attacks Alpha in the midst of a walker herd but her sister, Gamma, kills her, earning Alpha's respect. Beta discovers a shrine that Alpha has dedicated to Lydia, where Alpha reveals that she lied to the Whisperers about killing Lydia; Alpha destroys the shrine to prove that Lydia is "dead" to her. Beta informs Alpha of the satellite crash, leading Alpha to return to the border to investigate; she spots Carol from a distance. Flashbacks detail how Alpha met Beta and formed the basis for the Whisperers.
134	3	"Ghosts"	David Boyd	Jim Barnes	October 20, 2019	3.48
The group in Alexandria defends the community against waves of walkers, leading the survivors to suspect that Alpha is sending them. Negan earns Aaron's trust after saving him from walkers riddled with hogweed. Gamma arrives in Alexandria and tells the group to meet Alpha at the border, where Alpha demands more land as punishment for crossing into her territory; Carol tries to kill Alpha after she boasts about Henry's death but Michonne and Daryl stop her.
135	4	"Silence the Whisperers"	Michael Cudlitz	Geraldine Inoa	October 27, 2019	3.31
At Hilltop, a tree collapses and knocks down the wall; the survivors defend the community from an invasion of walkers. Because it is believed that the tree was knocked over by the Whisperers, Lydia is attacked by a group of Alexandrians; Negan saves her, accidentally killing one of the attackers in the process. The council is conflicted on what to do with Negan but he goes missing, alarming the community. A depressed Ezekiel nearly attempts suicide but Michonne intervenes. Michonne, Judith, Luke and others travel to Oceanside to help the community with walkers.
136	5	"What It Always Is"	Laura Belsey	Eli Jorné	November 3, 2019	3.09
Kelly becomes disorientated due to her hearing loss and gets lost in the woods but is found by Daryl, Connie and Magna. Aaron encounters Gamma and offers her bandages after she cuts her hand; Gamma flees and informs Alpha of their interaction. Negan is found and joined by Brandon who murders a mother and her son to impress Negan, leading Negan to kill him. At Hilltop, the community works to rebuild the wall, while Ezekiel reveals to Siddiq that he has thyroid cancer. Magna reveals to Yumiko that she killed a man who attacked her young cousin, causing a rift between the two. Negan crosses into the Whisperers' territory and is attacked by Beta.
137	6	"Bonds"	Dan Liu	Kevin Deiboldt	November 10, 2019	3.21
Carol and Daryl set out to destroy Alpha's walker horde; after Carol captures a Whisperer, Daryl becomes skeptical of Carol's intentions. At Alexandria, Rosita and several other survivors become ill after Gamma contaminates Alexandria's water supply with walker blood. Eugene talks to a stranger from an unknown community over the radio but insists that he will keep their communication a secret for the safety of both parties. Negan is tested by Beta to prove his worth; he later vows his loyalty to Alpha and is seemingly accepted into the group.
138	7	"Open Your Eyes"	Michael Cudlitz	Corey Reed	November 17, 2019	3.31
Carol interrogates the captured Whisperer, during which the Whisperer praises Alpha for claiming to have killed Lydia; he is later poisoned to death by Dante. Carol plans to turn the Whisperers against Alpha for lying about Lydia's death. Gamma meets Aaron at the border, where she holds him at knifepoint; Carol and Lydia arrive, leading Gamma to flee in shock over Lydia's survival. Lydia flees into the woods after realizing that Carol used her. Siddiq suddenly recognizes Dante as a Whisperer present during the pike beheadings, leading Dante to strangle Siddiq to death to protect his identity.
139	8	"The World Before"	John Dahl	Julia Ruchman	November 24, 2019	3.21
Dante's identity as a Whisperer spy is exposed after he attacks Rosita; he is revealed to be responsible for many recent incidents within the community. Dante is imprisoned but Gabriel murders him in his cell. Oceanside encounters a man named Virgil, whom they initially suspect to be a Whisperer; Virgil eventually offers to lead Michonne to a naval base containing valuable weapons. While searching for Alpha's horde with Daryl, Aaron, Magna, Connie, Kelly and Jerry, Carol spots and chases after Alpha; the group follows behind, where they are lured into a cave, surrounded by Alpha's horde.
140	9	"Squeeze"	Michael E. Satrazemis	David Leslie Johnson-McGoldrick	February 23, 2020	3.52
The group navigates through the cave, fending off walkers and Whisperers as they search for an exit; Kelly finds a crate full of faulty dynamite, which Carol recklessly detonates in hopes of destroying the horde. Daryl, Carol, Aaron, Jerry and Kelly eventually escape but Connie and Magna are trapped inside the cave after the exit collapses from the dynamite blast. Alpha becomes skeptical of Gamma's loyalty after Negan suggests that she might be a spy for Alexandria, leading Alpha to send Beta to track her down; Alpha "rewards" Negan for his intel by having sex with him.
141	10	"Stalker"	Bronwen Hughes	Jim Barnes	March 1, 2020	3.16
Gamma arrives at Alexandria to inform the group of what happened in the cave; despite her honesty, Gabriel and Rosita are skeptical and lock her in the cell. While searching for another entrance to the cave, Daryl spots Alpha and attacks her; the two brawl and both wind up critically wounded. Daryl is rescued by Lydia but Alpha is left behind. Beta invades Alexandria through a secret tunnel created by Dante, killing several Alexandrians in the process. Upon finding Gamma, Beta is attacked by Rosita but he overpowers her; Gamma offers to leave with Beta to save Rosita's life but Beta flees after being outnumbered. Alpha recovers and declares that she is now stronger than ever.
142	11	"Morning Star"	Michael E. Satrazemis	Julia Ruchman & Vivian Tse	March 8, 2020	2.93
Over the radio, the stranger, Stephanie, finally reveals her name and location to Eugene; they plan to meet in one week. Alpha and the Whisperers plan to attack Hilltop with the horde, forcing the community to start planning for battle; before the battle, Daryl reconciles with Carol. That night, Negan works with the Whisperers to lead the horde to Hilltop; the group fights back but the Whisperers begin to burn the community using flammable tree sap.
143	12	"Walk with Us"	Greg Nicotero	Eli Jorné & Nicole Mirante-Matthews	March 15, 2020	3.49
As Hilltop burns to the ground, the survivors scatter into groups in search of safety. While fighting walkers that broke in, Judith becomes shocked after accidentally killing a Whisperer, only snapping out of it when Earl takes her away. Magna escapes from the cave by blending in with the horde but Connie's fate remains unknown. While luring walkers away from Alden and Kelly, Gamma is found and killed by Beta. After getting the children to safety, Earl succumbs to a walker bite and is put down by Judith. Negan lures Alpha to a cabin after falsely claiming that Lydia is inside; he kills Alpha by slitting her throat and severing her head. Negan is then approached by Carol, revealing that the two were working together to kill Alpha.
144	13	"What We Become"	Sharat Raju	Vivian Tse	March 22, 2020	3.66
Michonne arrives at the naval base with Virgil but finds no weapons, soon realizing it is a trap. Virgil locks her up and she finds out that there are other captives on the island. Virgil drugs her and she experiences hallucinogenic visions of Andrea, Siddiq and of what her life would have been like if she had sided with Negan and the Saviors. As she comes to, she stabs Virgil, escapes and frees the others. She chases Virgil to the armory where she finds evidence that Rick Grimes may be alive. Allowing Virgil to live, she takes leave of the others and contacts Judith via walkie-talkie to tell of her intent to find Rick; she later comes across stragglers who need help catching up to a large group of organized troops marching ahead of them.
145	14	"Look at the Flowers"	Daisy von Scherler Mayer	Channing Powell	March 29, 2020	3.26
Flashbacks show Carol freeing Negan from his cell after he agrees to kill Alpha; in the present day, Carol hallucinates Alpha, who taunts her about her morality and her past. Negan struggles to convince Daryl that he killed Alpha; a group of Whisperers ambush the duo and appoint Negan as the new Alpha but Negan kills them to prove his loyalty to Daryl. Beta's past identity as a famous country singer is revealed; he plays his own records at high volume, luring walkers to his location. Eugene, Yumiko, and Ezekiel travel to meet Stephanie; on the road, they encounter a quirky and flamboyant survivor. Beta skins Alpha's face and attaches it to his mask before leading the horde of walkers to parts unknown.
146	15	"The Tower"	Laura Belsey	Kevin Deiboldt & Julia Ruchman	April 5, 2020	3.49
After introducing herself to Eugene, Ezekiel, and Yumiko, Princess accidentally scares away their horses and offers to lead them to transport. She takes them on a roundabout path as she wants to endear herself to them, having been alone for numerous years. Beta, hearing voices in his head, leads the horde of walkers he has gathered to Alexandria to find it empty. Alden and Aaron, hiding in the windmill, report on the movements to the rest of Alexandrians who have sheltered in a nearby hospital. Beta and the horde head towards the hospital.
147	16	"A Certain Doom"	Greg Nicotero	Story by : Jim Barnes & Eli Jorné & Corey Reed; Teleplay by : Corey Reed	October 4, 2020	2.73
With the hospital surrounded, Daryl and other survivors sneak through the horde and lead it away using a wagon and loud music; Beatrice is killed on the way. Several Whisperers make it into the hospital where Gabriel remains behind to allow the others to escape. Maggie and a masked survivor rescue Gabriel, having received Carol's letters and then saving Alden and Aaron. The Whisperers destroy the makeshift sound system, forcing Daryl's group to infiltrate the horde and kill the Whisperers one by one. After a fight with Negan, Beta is wounded by Daryl and consumed by the walkers. Lydia and Carol lead the horde over a cliff. Eugene's group is captured by armed soldiers while trying to make his rendezvous and Virgil finds an exhausted Connie near Oceanside.
148	17	"Home Sweet Home"	David Boyd	Kevin Deiboldt & Corey Reed	February 28, 2021	2.89
Maggie discovers that Negan has been released and Carol explains she released him and that Negan killed Alpha. Maggie learns that Hilltop had been burned and destroyed by the Whisperers. Maggie, Daryl and the others seek refuge for the night and later return to Maggie's group's haven to find two of their members dead and Maggie's son Hershel missing. Cole, a member of Maggie's group, explains who the Reapers are and that they destroyed their home. While searching for Hershel, Maggie and the others are attacked by a Reaper who ends up killing three members of Maggie's group. Maggie and Daryl manage to find the attacker and subdue him but he commits suicide with a grenade before they can interrogate him. Soon after, Maggie finds Hershel is safe. The group then returns to Alexandria, where the walls are being repaired.
149	18	"Find Me"	David Boyd	Nicole Mirante-Matthews	March 7, 2021	2.26
Daryl prepares to go hunting for food in the woods and reluctantly allows Carol to tag along. While hunting, Daryl's dog locates an abandoned cabin. In the cabin, Carol finds a note which Daryl remembers. In flashbacks to five years ago, two years after Rick's supposed death, Daryl wanders alone in the woods to find him. Daryl meets his dog's owner who at first takes Daryl hostage and interrogates him. The owner sets him free and the two have occasional run-ins. Eventually, the owner introduces herself as Leah and the two begin a relationship. Ten months later, Daryl returns to find Leah gone after an argument. In hopes that they would run into each other again, Daryl writes a note requesting Leah to find him. In the present day, Daryl blames Carol for what happened to Connie and the pair have a fight that ends with them going their separate ways.
150	19	"One More"	Laura Belsey	Erik Mountain & Jim Barnes	March 14, 2021	2.17
While on a supply run, Aaron and Gabriel find an apparently abandoned warehouse and spend the night. The next day, Aaron is missing and a gunman named Mays approaches Gabriel and tells him that this is his safehouse and that Gabriel and Aaron have taken his supplies. Mays reveals a tied-up Aaron and forces him and Gabriel to play Russian roulette. Gabriel and Aaron try to convince him that not all people are bad but he refuses and confesses what he did to his family. When Aaron is about to pull the trigger on himself, Mays tells him to stop. When Mays unties them, Gabriel kills him with the mace from Aaron's prosthetic arm. They then discover Mays' captive brother, along with the corpses of his family, in the attic. Aaron and Gabriel try to free him but he kills himself.
151	20	"Splinter"	Laura Belsey	Julia Ruchman & Vivian Tse	March 21, 2021	2.11
Eugene, Princess, Yumiko and Ezekiel are imprisoned in separate boxcars by a group of masked soldiers. While imprisoned, Princess is able to make contact with Yumiko before the latter is taken by soldiers. When Princess gets a splinter, she begins to suffer from PTSD. The following day, she discovers a way out to Eugene's boxcar. Eugene informs Princess to go back to her boxcar and follow the community's protocols. Princess is then interrogated by one of the soldiers, although she refuses to answer the questions; they force her back to her boxcar. Princess attempts to see Eugene again, only to find him gone. Ezekiel then enters her boxcar and the two have a brief argument. One of the soldiers then enters the boxcar. Princess and Ezekiel interrogate the soldier who reveals he is only following protocol. Ezekiel beats up the soldier only for Princess to realize she was hallucinating Ezekiel the whole time. Princess escapes and confronts another hallucination of Ezekiel who attempts to convince her to leave. Princess refuses in the end and returns to her boxcar. There, she frees the soldier and completes the interrogation, only for her and the group to be captured again.
152	21	"Diverged"	David Boyd	Heather Bellson	March 28, 2021	1.94
Daryl and Carol go their separate ways; Carol returns to Alexandria with Dog and Daryl goes off into the woods. Carol, wanting to feel useful, tries to make soup for the community with the limited resources available. Carol also makes a mousetrap to catch a rat that had been in the grain and repairs the solar panels. In the woods, Daryl's motorbike breaks down and he scavenges a vehicle for parts to fix it. Daryl realizes he is unable to fix it without the knife that he had given to Carol. Daryl comes across a group of walkers wearing military gear and he is able to kill them and take supplies, including a knife needed to fix his bike. Daryl returns to Alexandria and he and Carol ask each other about their difficult day. Their friendship is still strained and they again go their separate ways.
153	22	"Here's Negan"	Laura Belsey	David Leslie Johnson-McGoldrick	April 4, 2021	2.12
With increasing tensions between Negan and Maggie, Carol decides to banish Negan to Leah's cabin for his safety. Negan reflects on his past, where he was a deadbeat and unfaithful husband to his wife Lucille, who tells him that she has cancer and asks him to stay until she dies. Negan refuses to give up on her and continues to treat her as the apocalypse begins but he is forced to search for medicine when their stash is spoiled. Six weeks later, he meets a doctor named Franklin and his daughter Laura who gives him medicine after hearing his story but he is captured by a biker gang on the way home. He is released with the medicine after giving up Franklin's location but returns home only to see that Lucille had killed herself in his absence. After burning their house and Lucille, he returns to the biker gang, kills them and rescues Franklin and Laura. In the present, he digs up his Lucille baseball bat which is destroyed after killing a walker in self-defense. Burning the rest of the bat and at peace with his past, he returns to Alexandria and accepts whatever fate befalls him.

== Production ==
In February 2019, the series was renewed for a tenth season. Filming began in May 2019. Andrew Lincoln expressed interest in directing an episode for season 10, but he was not able to due to scheduling conflicts. Michael Cudlitz, who directed an episode in season 9, returned to direct the fourth and seventh episodes of season 10. Production for the original 16-episode order of season 10 was completed in November 2019. Production resumed in October 2020, for the six additional episodes for season 10. The series moved from shooting on 16 mm film to digital beginning with the six bonus episodes. This changed was prompted due to the COVID-19 pandemic and safety precautions with there being fewer "touch points" with digital than film.

=== Casting ===
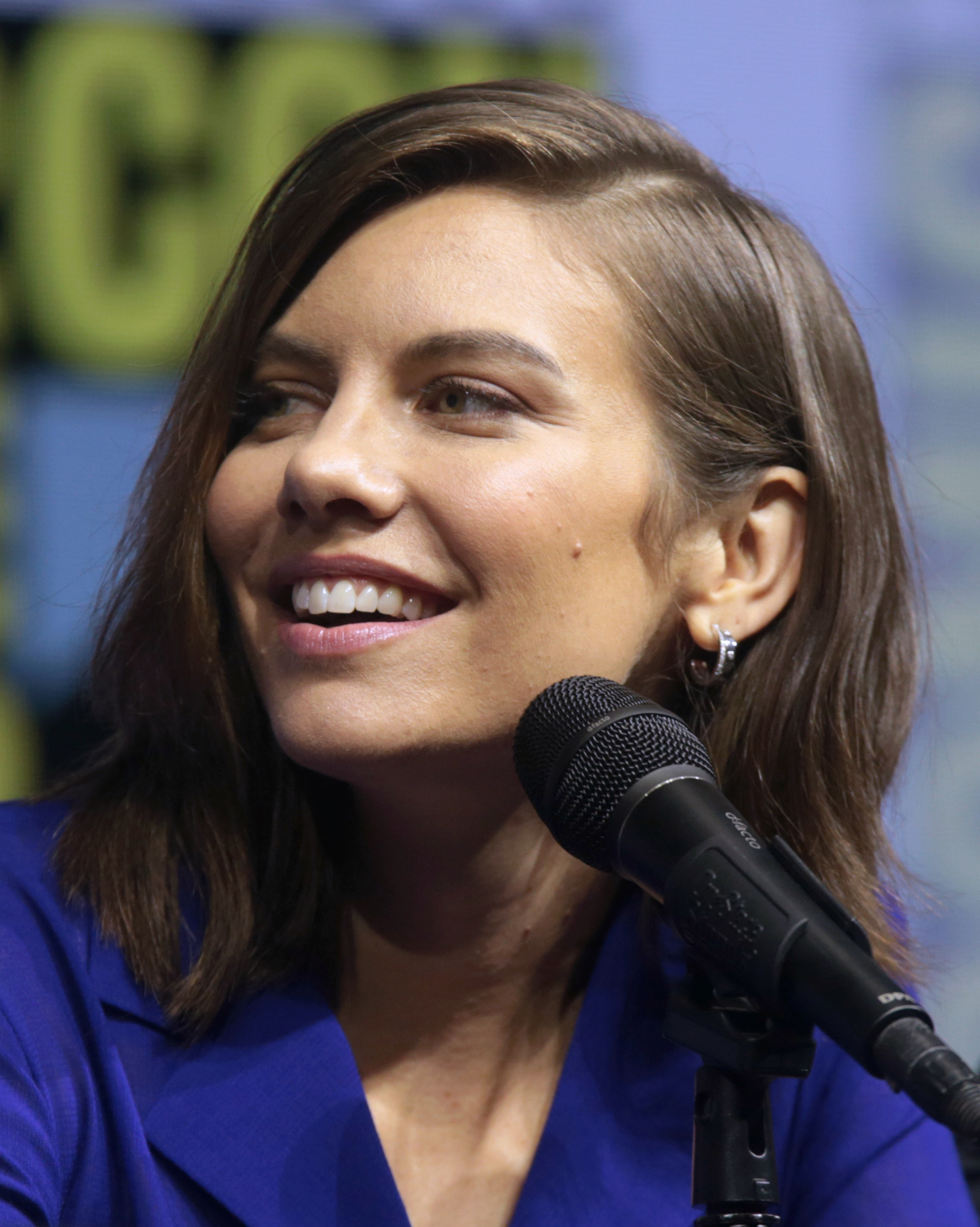
Lauren Cohan rejoined the series as Maggie Greene in late season 10, after being absent since early in the ninth season.

In February 2019, it was announced that Danai Gurira, who portrays Michonne, would exit the series in the tenth season. Gurira appeared in a limited capacity, in a handful of episodes that was interspersed throughout the season. Later, in July 2019, Gurira confirmed her exit at a panel at San Diego Comic-Con, and stated:

I can confirm this is the last season I'll be on this amazing TV show as Michonne. I would just like to say this has been one of the purest joys in my life. I am very very thankful for the experience I've had in ways that I can't even express right now. My heart does not leave... it doesn't ever end, the connection between us never ends. It was a very difficult decision. It was about my calling and other things I feel called to... as a creator of work. All I'm filled with is a lot of pain about leaving and a lot of gratitude and to all of you. I love you guys. TWD family is forever.

In July 2019, it was announced that Thora Birch and Kevin Carroll had been cast; Birch plays Gamma, a member of the Whisperers, and Carroll plays Virgil, a survivor looking for his family. Regarding Lauren Cohan's status on the show as Maggie Greene, showrunner Angela Kang remarked in July 2019, "I'll just say that we're working on it." Cohan left The Walking Dead in its ninth season to star in the TV series Whiskey Cavalier, however that series was canceled after one season. In October 2019, Kang affirmed Cohan would return as a series regular in season 11, but also hinted towards her appearance in the second half of season 10. Kang said that in developing season, even before knowing of Cohan's return, they had kept seeding that Maggie was still considered part of the ongoing narrative so that they could work in her return if she had the opportunity. The teaser trailer for "A Certain Doom", airing after the broadcast of "The Tower", confirmed Maggie's return to the series.

As part of the extended episodes for season 10, one focuses on Negan's backstory and introduces his wife Lucille, who is played by Morgan's real-life wife, Hilarie Burton. On November 19, 2020, it was announced that Robert Patrick and Okea Eme-Akwari had been cast for the extended episodes as new characters Mays and Elijah, respectively.

== Release ==
The trailer was released on July 19, 2019, at San Diego Comic-Con. The season premiere was made available for streaming to subscribers of AMC Premiere on September 29, 2019.

AMC announced in March 2020 that due to the COVID-19 pandemic, post-production on the season finale could not be completed by its planned April 12, 2020, airdate, and instead would air on October 4, 2020. Showrunner Angela Kang stated that the delay on post-production was related with coordination of the worldwide production studios doing their special effects before the state issued its shutdown orders that effectively shuttered their California production studio to combine those into the final episode package. "Home Sweet Home" premiered a week early on February 21, 2021, on AMC+ before its televised air date and subsequent episodes were released every Thursday ahead of its AMC linear premiere on Sunday.

The 22-episode tenth season was released on Blu-ray and DVD on July 20, 2021, with special features including multiple audio commentaries and an "In Memoriam" featurette.

== Reception ==
=== Critical response ===
The tenth season of The Walking Dead has received generally positive reviews. On Rotten Tomatoes, the season holds a score of 77% with an average rating of 7 out of 10, based on 392 reviews. The critical consensus reads: "A few changes in front of and behind the camera allow TWD create space for compelling new stories and some seriously scary new adversaries." Commenting on the season premiere, Brandon Davis of ComicBook.com called it a "perfect return" while Alex Zalben of Decider wrote that the episode is "gross, scary, and big budget storytelling the way only Walking Dead can do. Season 10 is already off to a promising start". Paul Tassi of Forbes praised the writing and direction, writing: "The writing remains on point, the direction is solid. The show is still in a good place."

In further reviews based upon the first three episodes available to critics, Tassi wrote that "they're all good episodes, and I think I liked each one more than the last" and "they're very solid and continue my confidence in the Angela Kang era of the show, showing that season 9 wasn't a fluke. The show is genuinely good now, and I can't wait to see what's next". Cameron Bonomolo of ComicBook.com praised the episodes for its horror elements, writing: "The Walking Dead Season 10 recaptures the same tone of raw realism established by first-season showrunner Frank Darabont, expanding on it with a flavoring that is deliciously eerie. Not only is The Walking Dead straight-up scary, it often feels like a genuine horror movie, a feat achieved either through atmosphere and tension-building or pop-up spooks."

The Walking Dead season 10: Critical reception by episode
Season 10 (2019–21): Percentage of positive critics' reviews tracked by the website Rotten Tomatoes

=== Accolades ===
The tenth season of The Walking Dead received five nominations for the upcoming 46th Saturn Awards—Best Horror Television Series (the series' fifth consecutive nomination, with four consecutive wins), Best Supporting Actor on a Television Series for Norman Reedus (his fourth nomination), Best Supporting Actress on a Television Series for Melissa McBride (her seventh consecutive nomination, with two consecutive wins), Best Performance by a Younger Actor on a Television Series for Cassady McClincy, and Best Guest Starring Performance on a Television Series for Jeffrey Dean Morgan (his fourth consecutive nomination, with two wins).

At the inaugural Critics' Choice Super Awards, the season was also nominated for Best Horror Series and Best Villain in a Series for Samantha Morton. The first half of the season was nominated for Outstanding Action Performance by a Stunt Ensemble a Comedy or Drama Series at the 26th Screen Actors Guild Awards (the series' eighth consecutive nomination). Additionally, Danai Gurira won the Gracie Award for Outstanding Female Actor in a Leading Role in a Drama.

=== Ratings ===
Viewership and ratings per episode of The Walking Dead season 10
No.	Title	Air date	Rating (18–49)	Viewers (millions)	DVR (18–49)	DVR viewers (millions)	Total (18–49)	Total viewers (millions)
1	"Lines We Cross"	October 6, 2019	1.4	4.00	0.9	2.31	2.3	6.31
2	"We Are the End of the World"	October 13, 2019	1.3	3.47	0.9	2.16	2.2	5.63
3	"Ghosts"	October 20, 2019	1.2	3.48	0.8	2.12	2.0	5.60
4	"Silence the Whisperers"	October 27, 2019	1.1	3.31	0.9	2.20	2.0	5.51
5	"What It Always Is"	November 3, 2019	1.0	3.09	1.0	2.25	2.0	5.34
6	"Bonds"	November 10, 2019	1.1	3.21	0.8	2.23	1.9	5.44
7	"Open Your Eyes"	November 17, 2019	1.1	3.31	0.9	2.11	2.0	5.42
8	"The World Before"	November 24, 2019	1.0	3.21	0.8	2.10	1.8	5.31
9	"Squeeze"	February 23, 2020	1.2	3.52	0.7	1.86	1.9	5.38
10	"Stalker"	March 1, 2020	1.0	3.16	0.8	1.84	1.8	5.00
11	"Morning Star"	March 8, 2020	0.9	2.93	0.6	1.52	1.5	4.45
12	"Walk with Us"	March 15, 2020	1.2	3.49	0.8	1.96	2.0	5.45
13	"What We Become"	March 22, 2020	1.2	3.66	0.8	1.91	2.0	5.57
14	"Look at the Flowers"	March 29, 2020	1.1	3.26	0.7	1.72	1.8	4.98
15	"The Tower"	April 5, 2020	1.1	3.49	0.6	1.51	1.7	5.00
16	"A Certain Doom"	October 4, 2020	0.9	2.73	—N/a	—N/a	—N/a	—N/a
17	"Home Sweet Home"	February 28, 2021	0.9	2.89	0.4	1.41	1.3	4.30
18	"Find Me"	March 7, 2021	0.7	2.26	0.5	1.55	1.2	3.81
19	"One More"	March 14, 2021	0.6	2.17	0.5	1.45	1.1	3.62
20	"Splinter"	March 21, 2021	0.6	2.11	—N/a	—N/a	—N/a	—N/a
21	"Diverged"	March 28, 2021	0.6	1.94	—N/a	—N/a	—N/a	—N/a
22	"Here's Negan"	April 4, 2021	0.6	2.12	—N/a	—N/a	—N/a	—N/a
