= Lines We Cross =

- The Walking Dead episode
- Episode no.: Season 10; Episode 1
- Directed by: Greg Nicotero
- Written by: Angela Kang
- Cinematography by: Duane Charles Manwiller
- Editing by: Alan Cody
- Original release dates: September 29, 2019 AMC Premiere; October 6, 2019 AMC TV
- Running time: 52 minutes

Guest appearances
- Dan Fogler as Luke; John Finn as Earl Sutton; Sydney Park as Cyndie; Juan Javier Cardenas as Dante; Kerry Cahill as Dianne; Lindsley Register as Laura; Angel Theory as Kelly; Avianna Mynhier as Rachel Ward; Blaine Kern III as Brandon; Anthony Lopez as Oscar; Gustavo Gomez as Marco; Jackson Pace as Gage; Antony Azor as R.J. Grimes; Tamara Austin as Nora; Anabelle Holloway as Gracie; Jerri Tubbs as Margo; David Shae as Alfred; Alex Sgambati as Jules

Episode chronology
← Previous "The Storm"	Next → "We Are the End of the World"
- The Walking Dead season 10

"Lines We Cross" is the premiere episode of the tenth season of the post-apocalyptic horror television series The Walking Dead, which aired on AMC on October 6, 2019. The episode was made available for streaming to subscribers of AMC Premiere on September 29, 2019.

== Plot ==
The harsh winter has passed, and the collective communities continue to thrive. There have been no signs of the Whisperers, and there are split opinions on what this means. Michonne and Daryl fear that they will return, and order others to respect the line that delineates their boundaries from others.

The collective communities have started training an army against walkers at Oceanside, however, during one exercise, they find a Whisperer walker mask washed ashore, and fears about the Whisperers spread to the communities. Scouting parties are sent out to check along the territory boundaries to see if there are any signs of walkers, but none are found. Carol returns from a time at sea. She and Daryl spend time together, and he informs her of the Whisperer news. Carol plans to return to sea, she asks Daryl to join her and they discuss leaving together on his bike.

Across the communities, they all witness fireballs fall from the sky into the nearby forest, within the Whisperers boundaries. Over radio, the communities agree that if they do not put out the fire, it will spread and threaten their communities, and fire-fighting teams are sent out. As they put out the fire, they find the fallen object is an old Soviet satellite. After a brief encounter with walkers drawn by the fire, the fire is extinguished, and Michonne orders everyone to leave immediately, but Eugene insists they need to recover the satellite for any technology that might help them. Michonne reluctantly agrees. During the chaos, Carol and Daryl come across a ravine. Daryl checks Carol is no longer planning to leave. As Daryl goes back to the others, Carol looks down into a nearby ravine and sees Alpha step out of the woods, and their eyes meet.

== Production ==
Beginning with this episode, Alanna Masterson and Katelyn Nacon are removed from the opening credits. According to showrunner Angela Kang, the idea of using a satellite was part of the writing team's take on trying to keep the show fresh. It was used both to show how the longer-term effects of the apocalypse have affected other parts of society - a long-forgotten satellite falling out of orbit with no one to monitor it - and helped to introduce technology that would become part of the season's arc. This is the first episode to feature Ryan Hurst (as Beta) in the show's opening credits, after he and six others were promoted to series regulars for season 10.

== Reception ==
=== Critical reception ===
"Lines We Cross" received critical acclaim from critics. On Rotten Tomatoes, the episode has an approval rating of 92% with an average score of 7.48 out of 10, based on 25 reviews. The site's critical consensus reads, "'Lines We Cross' sets the stage for TWD's 10th season with a fierce momentum that delivers equally on satisfying character moments and tense plotting."

=== Ratings ===
"Lines We Cross" received a total viewership of 4 million with a 1.4 rating in adults aged 18–49. It was the highest-rated cable program of the night.
