= Chokepoint (The Walking Dead) =

- The Walking Dead episode
- Episode no.: Season 9 Episode 13
- Directed by: Liesl Tommy
- Written by: Eddie Guzelian; David Leslie Johnson-McGoldrick
- Cinematography by: Duane Manwiller
- Editing by: Alan Cody; Brian G. Addie
- Original air date: March 10, 2019
- Running time: 41 minutes

Guest appearances
- Eleanor Matsuura as Yumiko; Cooper Andrews as Jerry; Ryan Hurst as Beta; Nadia Hilker as Magna; Brett Butler as Tammy Rose Sutton; John Finn as Earl Sutton; Angus Sampson as Ozzy; Lauren Ridloff as Connie; Cassady McClincy as Lydia; Kerry Cahill as Diane; Matt Lintz as Henry; Nadine Marissa as Nabila; Angel Theory as Kelly

Episode chronology
| ← Previous "Guardians" | Next → "Scars" |
- The Walking Dead season 9

"Chokepoint" is the thirteenth episode of the ninth season of the post-apocalyptic horror television series The Walking Dead, which aired on AMC on March 10, 2019. The episode was written by Eddie Guzelian and David Leslie-Johnson McGoldrick, and directed by Liesl Tommy.

In the episode, Daryl's (Norman Reedus) daring rescue mission forces Alpha to unleash a group of her own, led by Beta (Ryan Hurst), to retrieve her daughter Lydia (Cassady McClincy), even if the price is paid in blood. Meanwhile, The Kingdom's plans to reunite the communities are put in jeopardy.

The episode received mostly positive reviews, particularly the fight scene between Daryl and Beta.

== Plot ==
As Daryl and Connie have fled with Henry and Lydia from a group of Whisperers, Alpha's second-in-command, Beta, watches another Whisperer die from the walker attack earlier in the night. He vows to bring Lydia back, or failing there, to turn her whole group into walkers.

As the Kingdom prepares for their fair, one of their scout groups, led by Jerry, has been ambushed and robbed by a group called The Highwaymen. Jerry relates this to Carol and Ezekiel. When Carol learns of this, she suggests that because The Highwaymen did not kill Jerry's group, they may be open to negotiation. Meanwhile, Tara worries that Daryl's group hasn't arrived either, and she leads an expedition to locate them, accompanied by Yumiko, Magna, Kelly, Tammy, and Earl, fighting walkers along the way.

In the morning, Daryl's group is led by Connie to an incomplete high-rise that her group had taken shelter in before, where she shows Daryl that they could isolate the Whisperers by laying an ambush on the upper floors. They argue whether or not to bring Lydia back to home with them, with Connie writing on a piece of paper that she and Daryl have friends, whereas Lydia has none.

Ezekiel, Carol, and other Kingdom members go to the Highwaymen's headquarters, and lure the group into a trap so that the Kingdom group can overpower them. Ezekiel tries to convince the Highwaymen to help them keep the roads clear for the other communities traveling to the fair, offering them access to the Kingdom in return. While the Highwaymen initially refuse, they agree after Carol convinces them that they would have an opportunity to see a movie if they help. The Highwaymen then return the gear they stole and later help Tara's group make their way to the Kingdom.

Unsure about Lydia's trustworthiness, Daryl locks her in a closet with Dog while they prepare for Beta's group to arrive. When the group arrives, Beta and his allies are forced to abandon the walkers on the ground floor, giving Daryl and Connie the ability to kill them. Lydia, fearing for Henry's safety, breaks out of the closet, in time for Dog to attack a Whisperer that was about to kill Henry, though Henry still ends up injuring his leg. Daryl then has a brutal one-on-one fight with Beta, which ends with Daryl pushing him into an open elevator shaft. With the Whisperers subdued, the group work to lure the walkers out of the ground floor so that they can escape, unaware that Beta is still alive at the bottom of the elevator shaft.

== Production ==
Discussing the fight scene between Daryl (Norman Reedus) and Beta (Ryan Hurst), episode director Liesl Tommy explained: "I worked really hard with Monte [Simons] and Josh [Lamboy], our stunt guys, to make a fight that felt worthy of these two actors. So you just want that fight to be as visceral and brutal and, at the same time, feel like these are two men who may not be physically matched, but they match in intensity."

== Reception ==
=== Critical reception ===
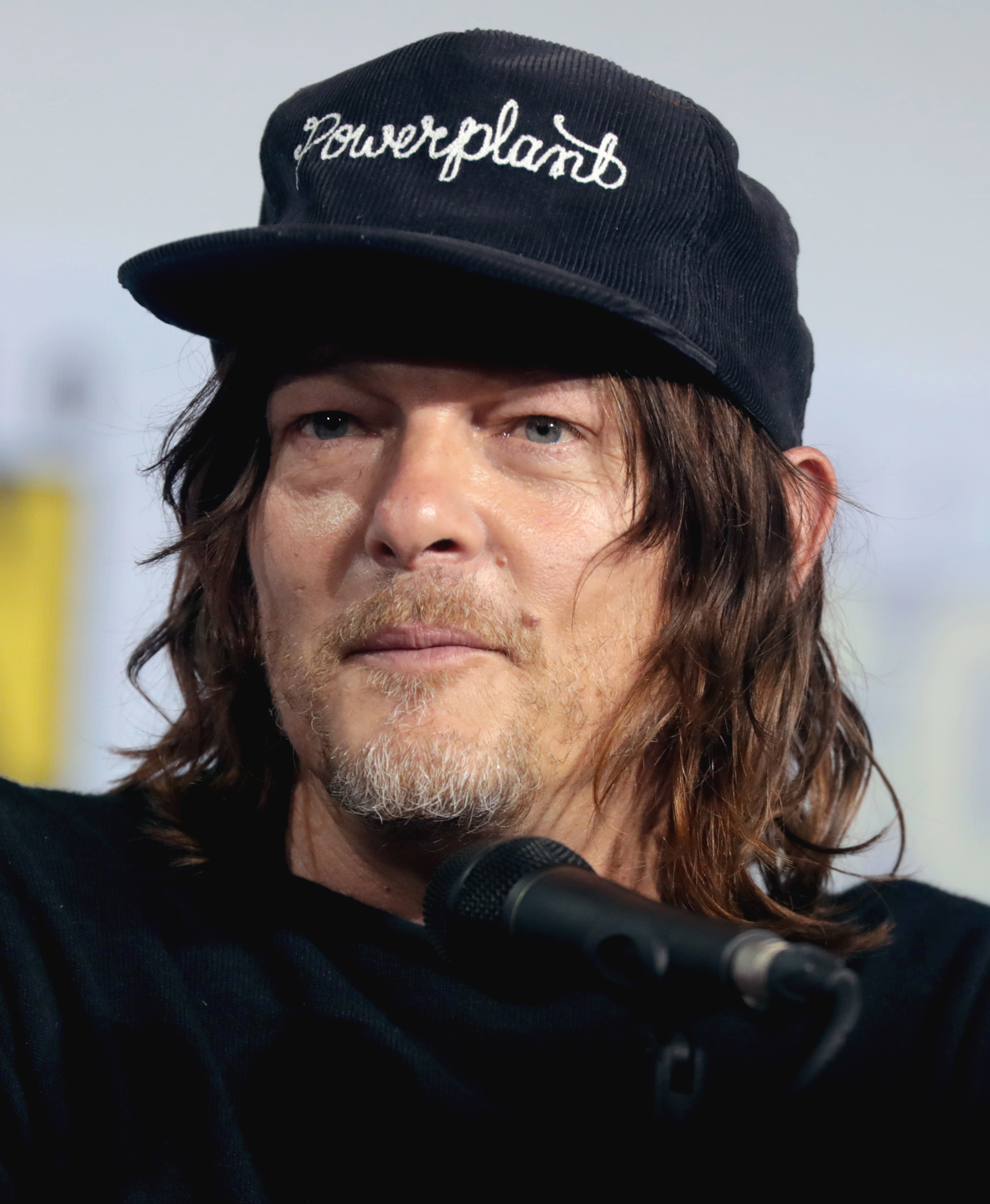
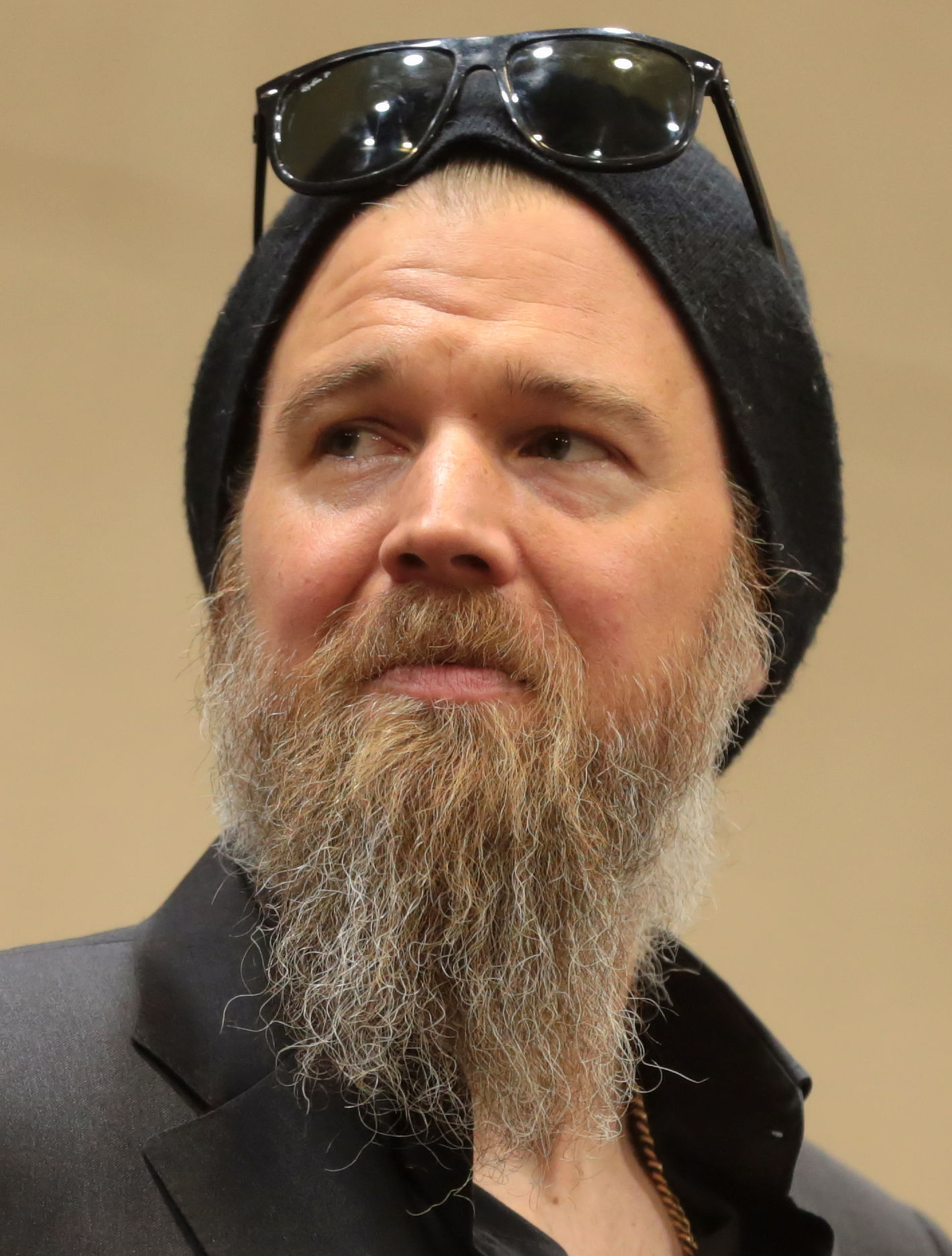
The fight scene between Daryl (Norman Reedus) and Beta (Ryan Hurst) received high praise from critics.

"Chokepoint" received critical acclaim. On Rotten Tomatoes, the episode has an approval rating of 90% with an average score of 7.40 out of 10, based on 20 reviews. The critical consensus reads: "'Chokepoint' brings a welcome dose of crunchy action to The Walking Dead, spotlighting Norman Reedus' physicality while introducing an intriguing new gang of rogues into the mix."

Matt Fowler of IGN gave the episode a positive review with a score of 7.9 out of 10. He praised the fight scene between Daryl and Beta, writing: "And it's here that we get a really awesome fight that allows Daryl to shine as the kind of action hero this series has needed for a long while." Overall, he felt: "If 'Chokepoint' had focused solely, or even a little more, on Daryl and Connie's clash with the wicked Whisperers, it would have felt like a stronger installment. Because all that stuff, even with Henry in mind, was pretty awesome. The Kingdom's side story, which sprinkled a whole new faction into the stew, was both harmless and head-scratchy. Payoff for it will hopefully come down the line, the sooner the better, but the other stuff was so strong that it just came off as bloat."

Jeff Stone of IndieWire gave the episode a B+, writing: "The whole action scene with Daryl's team vs the Whisperers is a stand-out, especially since the unfinished building provides ample hiding spots and surprise dangers, like the saw blade Beta nearly finishes Daryl with. Unlike the Savior years, here's a conflict that isn't just two groups of grimy extras shooting at each other from behind cover. The relative rarity of firearms, post time jump, has done wonders for the show's human vs. human fight scenes."

Erik Kain of Forbes praised the episode and in his review wrote that "Beta is terrifying" and "that whole fight scene was just phenomenal." He went on to say that "'Chokepoint' was, for the most part, a fantastic episode. It's certainly the first episode of 9B that had me on the edge of my seat. Mostly that's because of Beta who is just wonderfully scary and intimidating. The guy is huge, for one thing (at 6'4" he's got an inch on me) and in his trenchcoat and walker skin he's quite the striking figure, whether shambling slowly with his "guardians" or charging through a wall to attack Daryl."

=== Ratings ===
"Chokepoint" received a total viewership of 4.83 million with a 1.8 rating in adults aged 18–49. It was the highest-rated cable program of the night and improved in viewership from the previous week.
