= The Calm Before =

- The Walking Dead episode
- Episode no.: Season 9 Episode 15
- Directed by: Laura Belsey
- Written by: Geraldine Inoa; Channing Powell
- Cinematography by: Duane Manwiller
- Editing by: Dan Liu; Tiffany Melvin
- Original air date: March 24, 2019
- Running time: 57 minutes

Guest appearances
- Eleanor Matsuura as Yumiko; Dan Fogler as Luke; Cooper Andrews as Jerry; Ryan Hurst as Beta; Nadia Hilker as Magna; Jansen Panettiere as Casper; Brett Butler as Tammy Rose Sutton; John Finn as Earl Sutton; Angus Sampson as Ozzy; Lauren Ridloff as Connie; Cassady McClincy as Lydia; Kerry Cahill as Dianne; Cailey Fleming as Judith Grimes; Nadine Marissa as Nabila; Matt Lintz as Henry

Episode chronology
← Previous "Scars"	Next → "The Storm"
- The Walking Dead season 9

"The Calm Before" is the fifteenth and penultimate episode of the ninth season of the post-apocalyptic horror television series The Walking Dead, which aired on AMC on March 24, 2019.

This episode covers events of "Volume 24", "Issue #144" of Robert Kirkman's original comic book series, and in turn this episode marks the final appearances of Tara Chambler (Alanna Masterson), Henry (Matt Lintz) and Enid (Katelyn Nacon).

== Plot ==
As the fair at the Kingdom begins, Alpha leads an attack on a caravan from the Hilltop going to the Kingdom. Daryl and Michonne arrive with Judith, Henry, Lydia, and Connie, reuniting with Carol and Ezekiel. Michonne brings all the leaders from the communities together to apologize for Alexandria forgoing its relationships, to announce that Alexandria will give asylum to Lydia, and to establish a mutual protection pact knowing that Alpha will likely retaliate. To affirm the pact, Ezekiel has the communities sign Michonne's charter and then starts arranging for a small combined force to travel to the Hilltop to make sure it is secure from an attack by the Whisperers. As the fair continues, Alpha poses as one of the Alexandria fairgoers from the caravan and gathers information.

Earlier that day, Daryl's small force leaves for the Hilltop and meets up with the Highwaymen en route. The Highwaymen point them to the group of Hilltop residents that were killed by Alpha. The group decides to split up to look for any survivors. That night, Daryl, Michonne, Carol, and Yumiko are attacked by walkers, and take them out one by one until the Whisperers surround them. Beta emerges from the trees and tells them to drop their weapons, saying, "You just had to give me the girl. No one else had to die. Now that deal is done."

That night, as most of the fairgoers gather for the film, Lydia is saving a seat for Henry when Alpha sits next to her and gestures for her to stay quiet. Outside the theater, Alpha tries to convince Lydia to come with her, but Lydia rejects her. Alpha tells her she is not strong and is no longer part of her group, and departs. Later, at the Whisperers' new camp, Alpha, now out of disguise, joins her people, and approaches Daryl and company, who are captive. After announcing that her daughter is no longer a concern, Alpha tells Daryl to come with her alone.

At dawn, Alpha forces Daryl at gunpoint to the top of a cliff where a gargantuan horde of walkers and Whisperers walk beneath them. She tells him that his friends at the camp are fine and that she has marked off a line which is the extent of Whisperer lands, but the next time his people cross into her land, she'll release the horde into theirs. Daryl asks if she killed Lydia, and Alpha tells him that she didn't kill her, but doubts that Daryl can protect her. He tells her that she's wrong and leaves to reunite with his friends. Back in her camp, Alpha, in private, begins to cry over the loss of her daughter. However, when a Whisperer accidentally witnesses this, Alpha kills him to make sure no one ever sees her being weak.

As Daryl's group works their way back to the Kingdom, they find a beaten and bloody Siddiq tied to a tree. Siddiq is untied and points them to a nearby hill. To their horror, they find a line of ten severed heads on pikes made up of Ozzy, Alek, D.J., Frankie, Tammy Rose, Rodney, Addy, Enid, Tara, and Henry, meant to signify Alpha's territorial boundary. Later, in the Kingdom, Siddiq addresses the community to deliver the tragic news. He explains how they were taken by the Whisperers, and that Alpha left him alive to tell a story of what happened and to drive the communities apart again. Instead, Siddiq tells a different story: before the end, the prisoners were found by Ozzy, Alek and D.J., who gave them the chance to fight back. The prisoners fought to the end, protecting each other like family even though some of them didn't even know each other, and taking down several Whisperers. Though they failed in the end, they died as heroes which is how Siddiq wants them to be remembered and honored. Sometime later, Daryl and Lydia return to the border. Lydia leaves the necklace Henry made for her on the ground by the pike that once held Henry's head. As the two walk away, snow flurries begin to fall.

== Production ==
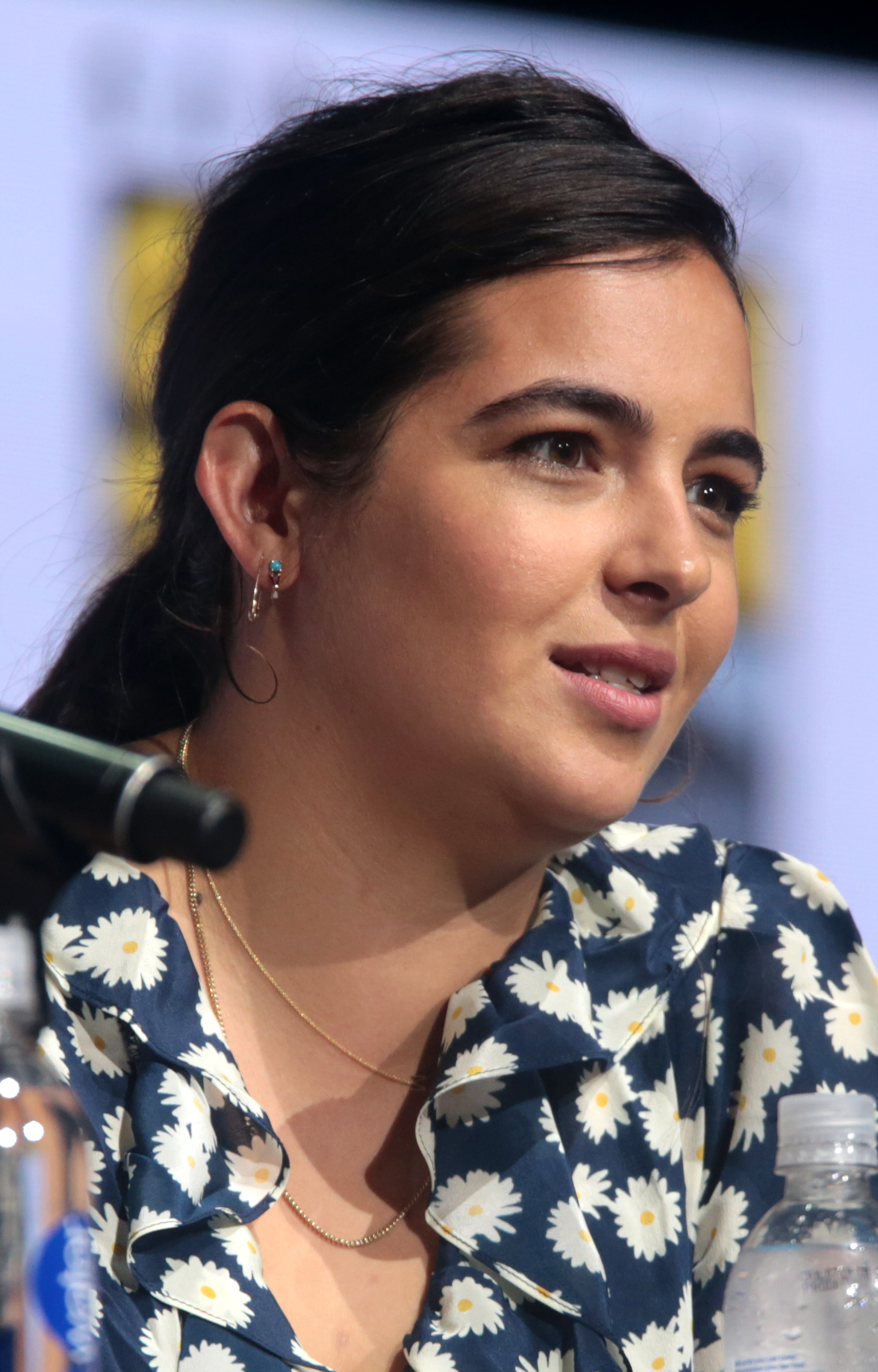
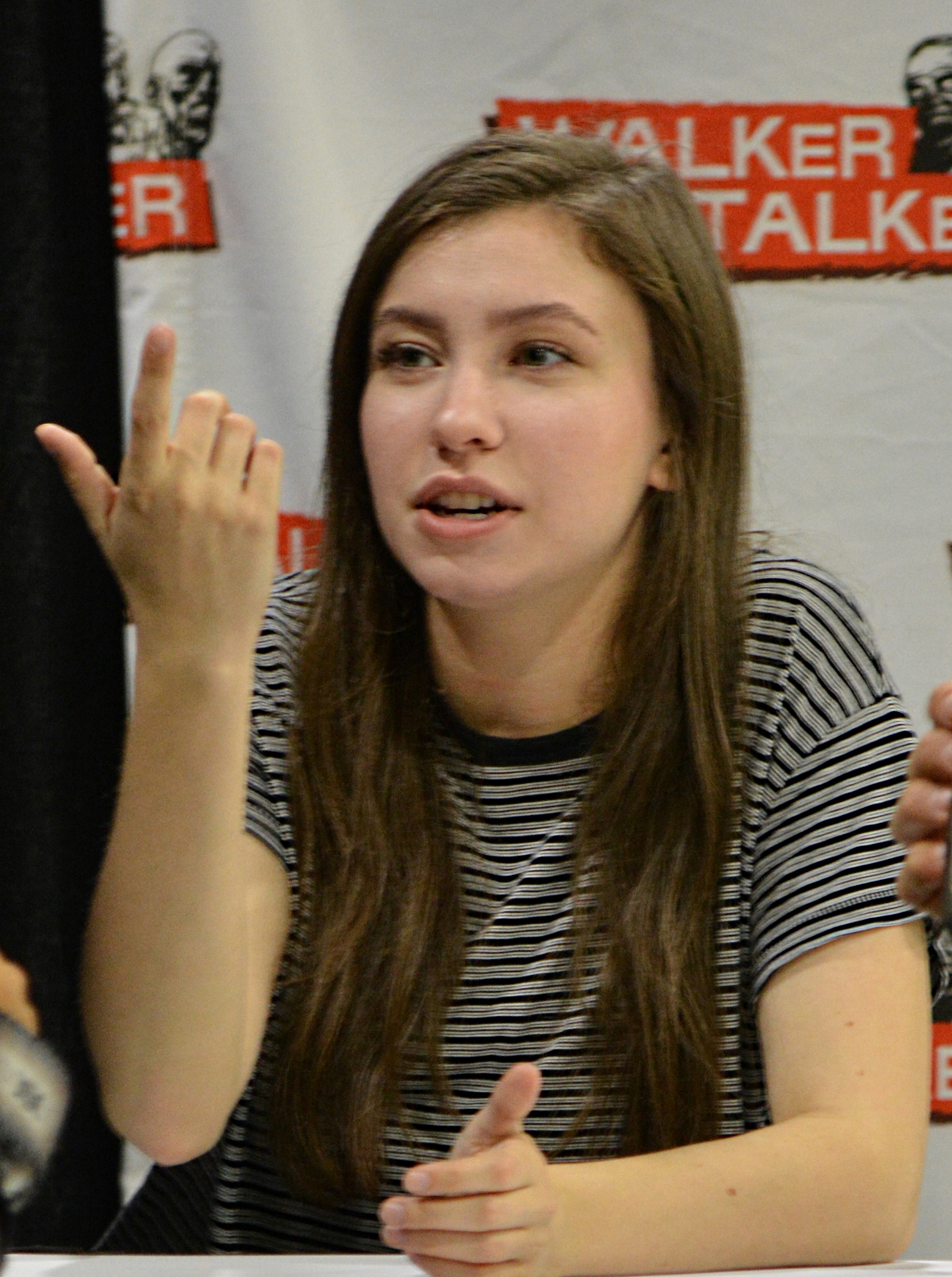
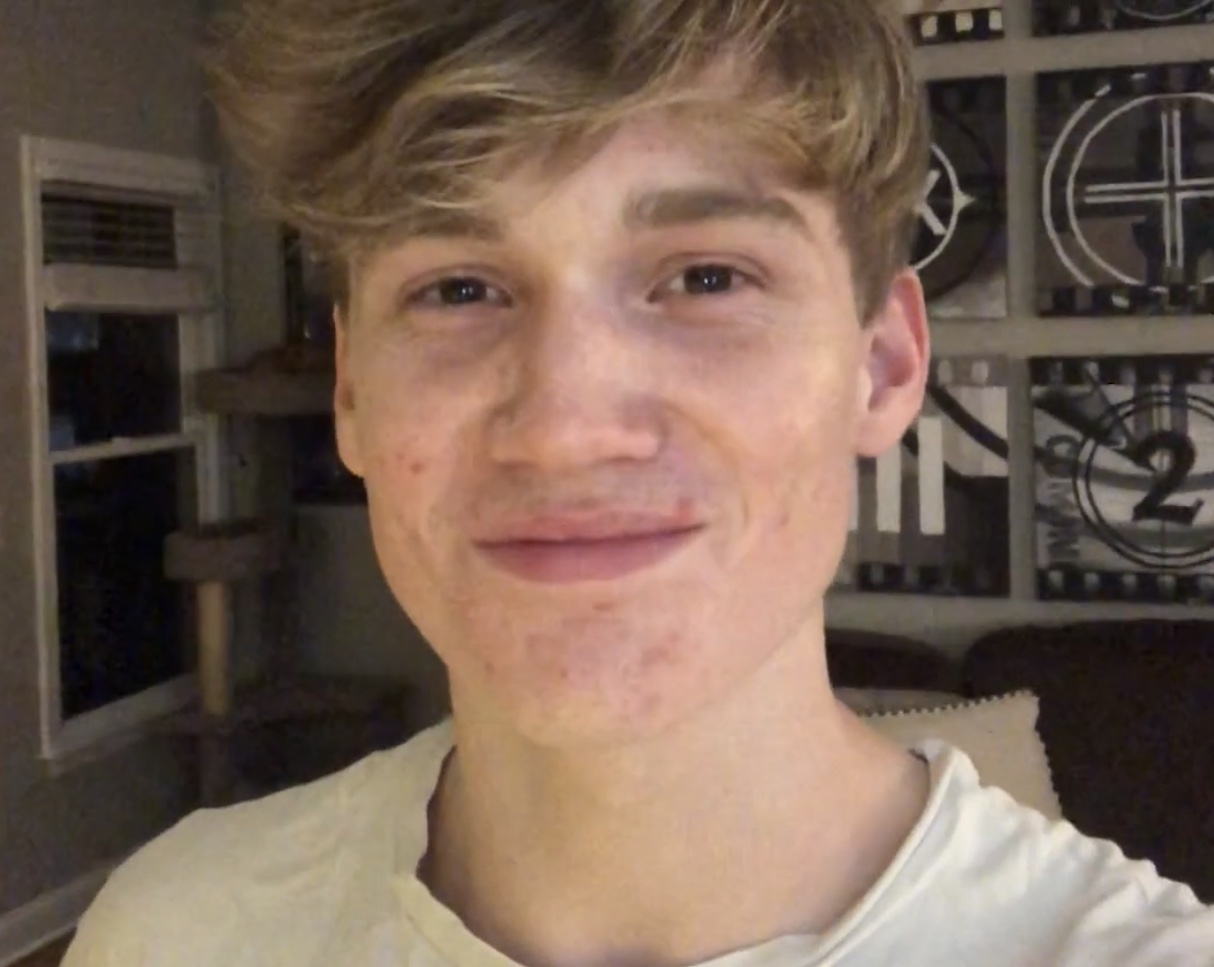
"The Calm Before" marks the final regular appearance of Tara Chambler (Alanna Masterson) and Enid (Katelyn Nacon). It also marks the final appearance of Henry (Matt Lintz).

"The Calm Before" involves the deaths of several characters and mirrors an iconic scene from the comic book series that is a preamble to the Whisperer War arc. Whereas in the comic, characters like Ezekiel and Rosita are among those beheaded and placed on the pikes, the show had long-time characters Tara, Enid, and Henry fall victim. According to executive producer Greg Nicotero, they knew that this scene would happen where it did in the season, but not until about two to three episodes prior in the production schedule did they know who would be falling victim. Alanna Masterson, who played Tara, said she only got the call about this about two weeks before filming, while Katelyn Nacon, who played Enid, had been alerted by showrunner Angela Kang at the start of filming of the season that Enid might leave the show by this episode, but that wasn't confirmed until they began rehearsing.

The writing crew had gone back and forth when writing the episode to figure out which victims felt most natural at this point based on their state in the show's universe. In the case of Henry, this was necessary to cement storylines for Ezekiel, Carol, and Daryl going forward, but for Tara and Enid, Greg Nicotero noted that Tara was finally becoming more comfortable as a leader, while Enid was showing a budding romance with Alden, so that both deaths were considered tragic. Because the identities of the victims were decided so late, production then had to rush to produce the head props for filming. Some of the heads were made from molds of the actors and given limited animatronics to make their mouths move. For Henry, Tara, and Enid, they used a combination of these animatronic heads alongside digital placements of the actors themselves acting out their dying roles. A clip of the 1950 Noveltoons cartoon Quack-A-Doodle-Doo, in which Baby Huey accidentally pulls out the skin of a fox's head after choking him, was included to foreshadow the characters' fate; due to the film being in the public domain, the crew did not consult Paramount Pictures to use the cartoon.

== Reception ==
=== Critical reception ===
"The Calm Before" received critical acclaim from critics. On Rotten Tomatoes, the episode has an approval rating of 91% with an average score of 8.6 out of 10, based on 22 reviews. The critical consensus reads: "'The Calm Before' exemplifies everything that The Walking Dead does best - bittersweetly affirming the bonds of a makeshift community and finding glimmers of humanity in a nihilistic landscape before dropping a horrifying twist that will leave viewers reeling long after."

Erik Kain in his Forbes review noted the following about the brutal ending: "I'm pretty sure I've said more than once that Enid and Tara need to go, and now they have. I feel a tiny bit bad about it now. But only a tiny bit. The cast has become far too unwieldy, even with a bunch of character deaths." Writing for Den of Geek!, Ron Hogan in his review said: "The Walking Dead rarely deals in taut emotions, preferring to manipulate with big pushes and pokes. The Calm Before has that in spades, but the creative team is able to dial it back, sprinkling moments of hopefulness in front of Alpha. Unlike Lydia, who was taken in by it, she's repulsed, and while it doesn't show on her face, it shows in her actions, and her talk with Daryl at shotgun-point. The very same incidents strike two related people totally differently, and in the denouement of the episode, the very things that lend sweetness and happiness end up causing the greatest in bittersweet pain."

However, Jeff Stone writing for IndieWire gave the episode a B− saying: "The decapitation border is a big moment from the comics, which I have not read. Apparently, the victim line-up was quite different, but such changes are par for the course at this point. It's interesting that the show feels compelled to stick with those big events, but is perfectly content to change the characters. Doesn't matter whose heads are on those sticks, as long as there are some heads on sticks. The reveals of the victims, with oblivious people at the fair wondering about the whereabouts of each character, was particularly effective. Alden scanning the crowd for Enid as he performs his number with Luke was probably the most devastating."

Alex McLevy writing for The A.V. Club praised the episode with a qualification of A− and in his review he said: "At best, “The Calm Before” could be a memorial for what this show has been as it heads toward a new future, a reminder of what it used to look like during its strongest seasons, before reshuffling the undead chessboard of its major players and changing up the nature of its structure and stories. “Warning Signs” showed this was possible, and the Whisperers are an ideal foil by which to engage in some ambitious new ways of dealing with these characters and communities as they enter a new era of existence. True, this show hasn't demonstrated anything like the kind of consistency that would point to such a maneuver; continuing its uneven mix of soap-opera melodrama and intriguing experiments in post-apocalyptic thrills is the likely progression. But as we close the book on season nine and look to the show's 10th(!) year, this was an excellent reminder of what got us all tuning in in the first place."

=== Ratings ===
"The Calm Before" received a total viewership of 4.152 million with a 1.5 rating in adults aged 18–49. It was the highest-rated cable program of the night, however, it decreased in viewership from the previous week to a new series low.
