= Scars (The Walking Dead) =

- The Walking Dead episode
- Episode no.: Season 9 Episode 14
- Directed by: Millicent Shelton
- Written by: Corey Reed; Vivian Tse
- Cinematography by: Stephen Campbell
- Editing by: Evan Schrodek
- Original air date: March 17, 2019
- Running time: 45 minutes

Guest appearances
- Rutina Wesley as Jocelyn; Lauren Ridloff as Connie; Cassady McClincy as Lydia; Lindsley Register as Laura; Cailey Fleming as Judith Grimes; Kenric Green as Scott; Matt Lintz as Henry

Episode chronology
← Previous "Chokepoint"	Next → "The Calm Before"
- The Walking Dead season 9

"Scars" is the fourteenth episode of the ninth season of the post-apocalyptic horror television series The Walking Dead, which aired on AMC on March 17, 2019.

== Plot ==
The episode is split between a flashback to the aftermath of Rick's apparent death and the present.

In the flashback segments, a pregnant Michonne and Daryl look for any trace of Rick for closure, but only discover his revolver. Daryl explains his choice to go live on his own; Michonne returns to Alexandria alone. In a later time at Alexandria, Michonne watches as some strangers arrive and discovers among them her old college friend, Jocelyn. Michonne vouches for her to the others and brings Jocelyn in for medical care, but Jocelyn urges them to recover the children she was protecting at a nearby building; they safely recover the children.

That night, all of Jocelyn's children, including Judith and the other Alexandrian ones, enjoy a bonfire. Meanwhile, Jocelyn explains to Michonne that all of the adults of her group have died, but the children have become skillful hunters. When morning comes, the Alexandrians find that Jocelyn and the children have all fled, killing at least one Alexandrian, kidnapping Judith and the other children, and stealing much of the community's food and medical supplies before fleeing into the sewers. Daryl joins up with Michonne to track them down. Michonne laments about how she trusted Jocelyn, but Daryl convinces her that it wasn't her fault.

They eventually find one of the children sneaking around a school and give chase, but they are both lured into a trap by Jocelyn and the children. Sometime later, Michonne and Daryl wake up bloodied and tied to a pipe, and realize that Jocelyn has brainwashed the children to be vicious and nearly feral. They are then painfully branded with an iron X, a sign of strength according to Jocelyn. When they are left alone, Daryl is able to help them escape and they decide to split up to look for the Alexandria children, who are forced into a trailer outside. In the hallway, one child slashes Michonne across her pregnant stomach, with little regard to the infant she carries. Michonne eventually finds an exit, but is immediately beaten with a wooden plank by Jocelyn. However, Michonne summons the strength to stab Jocelyn in her leg and chest, killing her. Michonne then tries to convince children that they can all return to Alexandria, but Mitchell, second-in-command of Jocelyn's group, instructs the children to kill the Alexandrians. She is forced to kill Mitchell and begs the kids to stop, but they all refuse and charge towards Michonne. With no other options, Michonne is forced to kill them one by one, much to her anguish, with only one leaving peacefully. After the massacre, Michonne and Daryl recover the children back to Alexandria. Following these events, Michonne decides to no longer allow strangers in Alexandria. As a result, relationships between Alexandria and the other communities break down.

In the present, Aaron alerts Michonne of Daryl's group's presence at the Alexandria gates, including Connie, Henry, and Lydia. Daryl vouches for Lydia to convince Michonne to let them take shelter. They stay long enough for Henry to get the medical care he needs, but Michonne refuses to provide them an escort to the Kingdom. Later, Judith talks to Daryl, disappointed about how Michonne has been acting. That night, Daryl, Connie, Henry, and Lydia take off to return to the Kingdom, with Michonne seeing them off.

In the morning, Michonne finds Judith has left on her own, having taken Rick's pistol. She accosts Negan about if he knows where Judith went, but he instead tells her that Judith is trying to follow what Carl had suggested for the communities and upset that Michonne refuses to let anyone in. Michonne then goes off on her own and eventually catches up with Judith as she is surrounded by walkers; the two fight off the walkers. As Michonne takes care of Judith's non-fatal wounds, Judith tells Michonne that she remembers witnessing her kill Jocelyn and her children in order to rescue her, something Michonne was not aware of and had not talked about with her. Judith then explains that she feels that Michonne no longer has love for their allies and that she went on her own to help them; they hug and reconcile.

Back in Alexandria, at Carl's grave, Michonne explains to Judith that they never wanted to bury another child, but after the incident with Jocelyn she decided to make Alexandria only about those within as to keep the children safe. Michonne realizes what Judith's concern has been and agrees that they should help protect their allies. They go off to catch up with Daryl's group via a horse-drawn carriage to help them arrive to the Kingdom faster. They soon arrive and enter the Kingdom, unaware that a pair of Whisperers are watching them and plan to inform Alpha.

== Production ==
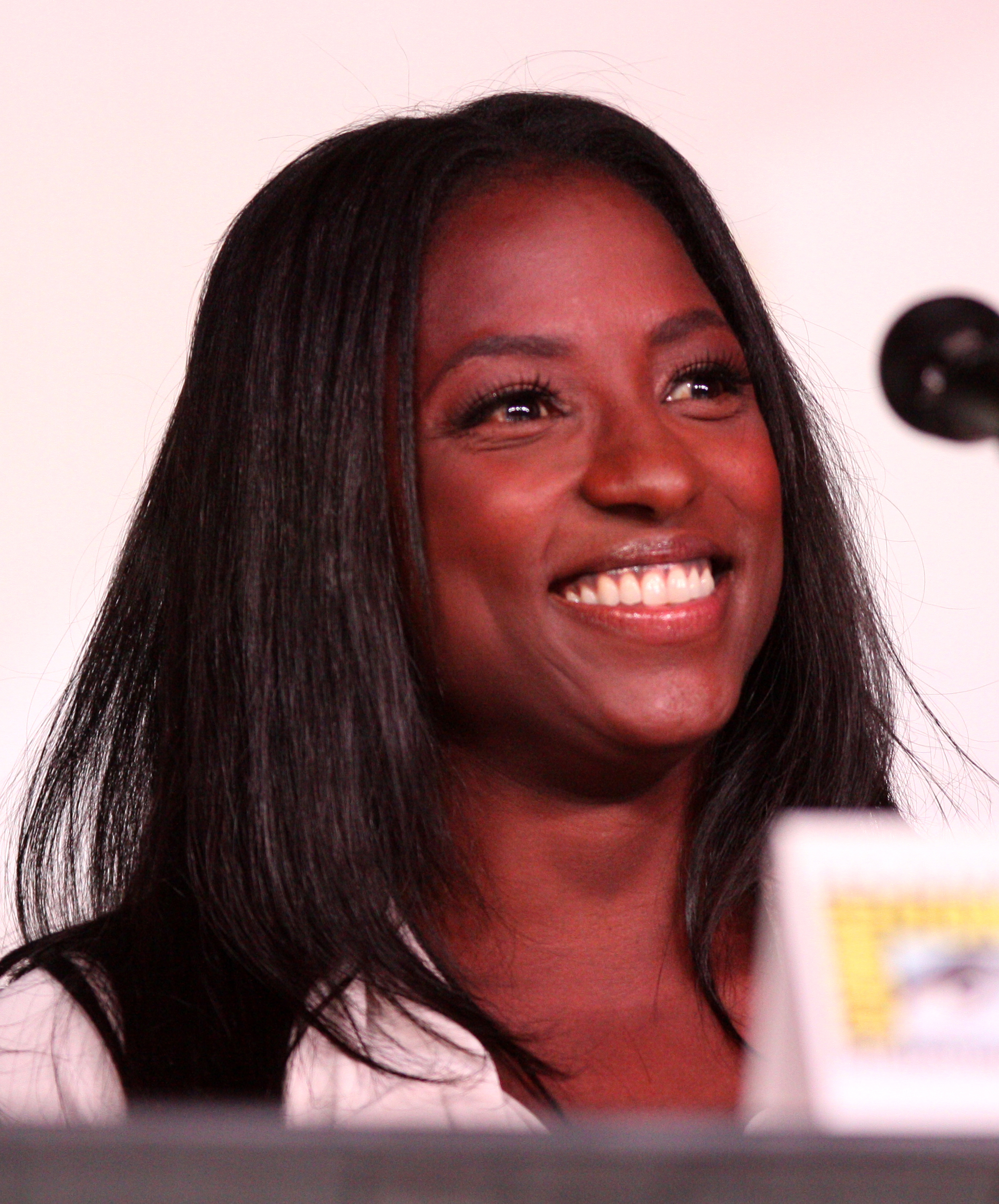
Rutina Wesley guest starred in this episode as Jocelyn.

Because of the story featuring violence toward children shown in this episode, AMC took several precautions to minimize any psychological harm to the child actors. During casting, the casting directors met with the children and parents, and were upfront about their roles in this episode. Once the cast was selected, they and their parents met with the writers Corey Reed and Vivian Tse, and the assistant producers to review their roles. During production, there were both a production staff psychologist and a contracted child psychologist on set. All props used were rubber and the crew took extensive time to choreograph the action scenes to further avoid any surprises. Further, the episode's structure, alternating between flashback and present, allowed them to cut away from any of the children's deaths, instead using Michonne's attacks on the walkers instead. Director Millicent Shelton also spent time with both showrunner Angela Kang and Michonne's actress Danai Gurira to make sure that the progression of the scenes shows that Michonne was attempting as much as she could to avoid harming the children until they had shown their willingness to harm Judith or Michonne's unborn child. Several changes were made during filming to further this point, such as asking the child actors to be more ferocious towards Michonne to strengthen her decision.

== Reception ==
=== Critical reception ===
"Scars" received positive reviews. On Rotten Tomatoes, the episode has an approval rating of 85% with an average score of 6.99 out of 10, based on 20 reviews. The critical consensus reads: "An emotionally lacerating installment of The Walking Dead provides crucial backstory for the series' new status quo with a flashback structure that culminates in a shocking set-piece that will leave even the most hard-bitten fans shaken."

Erik Kain from Forbes gave an overwhelmingly positive review of the episode, "Filled with betrayal, terror, torture and the kind of gripping excitement that keeps you on the edge of your seat, I didn't think we'd ever see an episode like this again from AMC's zombie drama. Thank goodness, I was wrong."

However, Jeff Stone from IndieWire gave a negative review, along with a D+ rating, stating, "After a relatively solid string of episodes, "Scars" is Season 9's first big stinker, a nasty piece of work that doesn't even have the courage of its own convictions."

=== Ratings ===
"Scars" received a total viewership of 4.57 million with a 1.7 rating in adults aged 18–49. It was the highest-rated cable program of the night, however, it decreased in viewership from the previous week.
