= Stalker (The Walking Dead) =

- The Walking Dead episode
- Episode no.: Season 10; Episode 10
- Directed by: Bronwen Hughes
- Written by: Jim Barnes
- Cinematography by: Duane Charles Manwiller
- Editing by: Tiffany Melvin
- Original air date: March 1, 2020
- Running time: 45 minutes

Guest appearances
- Thora Birch as Gamma / Mary; Kenric Green as Scott; Lindsley Register as Laura; David Shae as Alfred; Anabelle Holloway as Gracie; Antony Azor as R.J. Grimes

Episode chronology
← Previous "Squeeze"	Next → "Morning Star"
- The Walking Dead season 10

"Stalker" is the tenth episode of the tenth season of the post-apocalyptic horror television series The Walking Dead, which aired on AMC on March 1, 2020. The episode was written by Jim Barnes and directed by Bronwen Hughes.

After escaping the cave, Daryl (Norman Reedus) confronts Alpha (Samantha Morton). Meanwhile, the residents of Alexandria must defend the community from a threatening, outside force—Beta (Ryan Hurst). The episode was acclaimed by critics.

== Plot ==
At Alexandria Gamma arrives to explain that their people are trapped in a cave surrounded by Alpha's horde. Gabriel seems to believe Gamma's story, but Rosita calls her a liar and knocks Gamma unconscious, and orders for her to be put in the basement cell. She later wakes up in the cell where she is confronted by Gabriel and Rosita about Dante's actions, but she claims she wasn't involved in that. When Gabriel insists she is hiding something and calls for a sincere confession, Gamma tearfully reveals she killed her sister for Alpha. Believing her, Gabriel accepts her help.

In the woods, Daryl secretly observes Alpha and three of her followers leading a faction of the horde from another entrance to the cave. Following them to a river, Daryl attacks them; a brutal fight ensues between Alpha and Daryl, culminating with Alpha stabbing him in the leg with a knife. A horde of walkers is attracted by the commotion, forcing the two of them, both severely injured, to flee the scene separately. Alpha soon stumbles into an abandoned gas station where Daryl is hiding, with the knife still in his leg; she starts making noise to attract the nearby walkers. Daryl is able to defend himself against the oncoming walkers, but is forced to pull the knife out of his leg to kill the last one; in doing so, he begins to lose massive amounts of blood.

Meanwhile, in the Alexandria meeting hall, Gamma shows them the location of the cave on a map and explains that most of Alpha's forces are situated around the cave, so the borders are defenseless. Alexandria is informed by their surveillance post, three kilometers from the community, about a hundred-walker horde incoming. Unable to receive a response, Gabriel assigns Rosita and Laura to secure the gates with a support group while he and others head out on a recon mission.

That night, Beta infiltrates Alexandria via underground tunnels, entering through a grave. He murders several survivors in their homes, turning them into walkers so the others will soon have to deal with the undead as a distraction. On the road, Gabriel and his scout team find that the soldiers from the surveillance post have been murdered, and realize the Whisperers forced them to give false information about the horde so they would leave Alexandria and weaken the inner defense. Beta soon finds Gamma in her cell where she explains to Beta that the community is not as Alpha had told them. Unfazed, Beta demands Gamma to go with him. Laura then appears and threatens Beta with an ax; she tells Gamma to get help. As Gamma flees, Beta overpowers and kills Laura.

Gamma hides inside the Grimes' residence, alongside R.J. and Judith. Beta tracks Gamma into the house, searching the house until he comes to a door; Judith shoots him from behind the door, knocking him on his back but not killing him due to his bulletproof vest. Judith and R.J. are able to escape past him, but he grabs Gamma by the leg, tripping and knocking her out. Rosita appears and clashes with Beta; she manages to hurt him, but he gains control of the fight and slams her on the ground. As Beta prepares to kill Rosita, Gamma picks up one of his knives, threatening to commit suicide. Knowing that Alpha wants her alive, Beta leaves Rosita, and he and Gamma depart together. Along the way, they are caught by Gabriel's group; Beta quickly flees. Gamma, lying on the ground, surrenders and tells Gabriel that she was not responsible for what happened in Alexandria; the scout team and Gamma return to Alexandria.

Back at the gas station, Lydia soon appears and approaches Alpha, who reveals she has been training Lydia to be her replacement when she is gone and asks Lydia to kill her. She refuses to kill her mother and instead leaves her to pass out from blood loss. In the morning, Alpha finds Lydia has left and scrawled "your way is not the only way" into a wooden table.

Daryl wakes up in the woods to find that Lydia has nursed him back to health. Alpha, reunited with the Whisperers, vows to exact revenge on the communities with their horde while reiterating the Whisperers' anthem, officially declaring war.

== Production ==
The episode features the death of Lindsley Register as Laura, who had been on the show since the seventh season, first appearing in the episode "The Cell".

== Reception ==
=== Critical reception ===
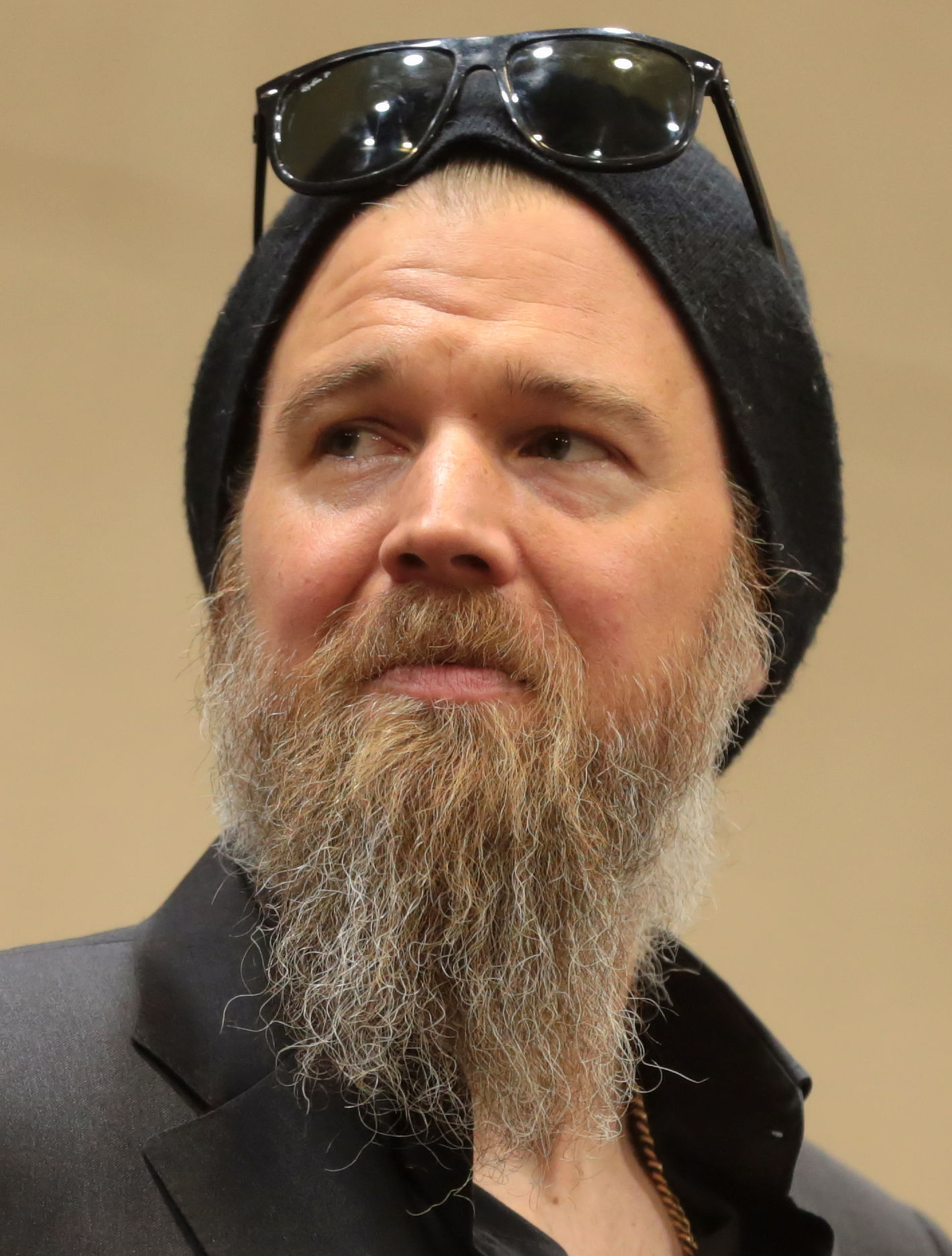
Ryan Hurst, who plays Beta, received positive reviews for his horror film-like performance.

"Stalker" received critical acclaim. On Rotten Tomatoes, the episode has an approval rating of 100% with an average score of 8.00 out of 10, based on 19 reviews. The site's critical consensus reads: "Fueled by a thrillingly brutal confrontation between Daryl and Alpha, 'Stalker' showcases a nerve-wracking flashpoint that brings the tensions of the incoming Whisperer War to a simmering boil."

Ron Hogan of Den of Geek gave the episode a rating of 4 out of 5 and praised the episode, writing: "The knife fight between Alpha and Daryl is well-shot, chaotic enough with walkers and other Whisperers to effectively disguise Alpha's presence without muddying up the solid choreography." He also positively commented on Ryan Hurst as Beta, stating that he "does a brilliant job of simply lurking in the background of scenes like a true Michael Myers type".

Alex McLevy writing for The A.V. Club gave the episode a "B" grade and complimented the direction by Bronwen Hughes as the MVP of the episode, writing: "She knows how to cross-cut between locations and points of view, ratcheting up momentum and intensity without sacrificing coherence or spatial geography." Jeff Stone of IndieWire gave the episode an "A−" rating and wrote that the episode "might not let us know what's going on with Connie, Magna, or Carol, but it more than makes up for that by delivering two taut, exciting plots and ratcheting up the tension of the Whisperer War".

Writing for Vulture, Richard Rys praised fight scene between Daryl and Alpha, stating that "the brawl that ensues does not disappoint". Alex Avard of GamesRadar+ gave the episode 2.5/5 stars and opined the episode as "another series of fairly inconsequential events [that] are stretched out over the course of 45 minutes". He concluded by writing that the episode "treated us to some strong character moments from Daryl, Beta, and Gabriel, but boil it down to its rudiments, and little has really changed in the dynamics of the Whisperer war at large".

=== Ratings ===
"Stalker" received a total viewership of 3.16 million and was the second highest-rated cable program of the night.
