= Guardians (The Walking Dead) =

- The Walking Dead episode
- Episode no.: Season 9 Episode 12
- Directed by: Michael E. Satrazemis
- Written by: LaToya Morgan
- Cinematography by: Stephen Campbell
- Editing by: Dan Liu
- Original air date: March 3, 2019
- Running time: 44 minutes

Guest appearances
- Lauren Ridloff as Connie; Cassady McClincy as Lydia; Lindsley Register as Laura; Cailey Fleming as Judith Grimes; Matt Lintz as Henry; Ryan Hurst as Beta

Episode chronology
← Previous "Bounty"	Next → "Chokepoint"
- The Walking Dead season 9

"Guardians" is the twelfth episode of the ninth season of the post-apocalyptic horror television series The Walking Dead, which aired on AMC on March 3, 2019.

== Plot ==
As Alpha leads her group back to camp, she questions Lydia about her time at the Hilltop and to reveal any information she learned while held captive, but her daughter claims that there was little of interest. Henry eventually catches up with Lydia and the Whisperers, and watches them from a close distance as they rest, but is found and grabbed by Beta, Alpha's second-in-command. Beta tosses Henry in front of Alpha, who questions the boy. Henry reveals that he came alone to get Lydia; Alpha decides that Henry is coming with them. On their way back to camp, Alpha asks Lydia why she didn't mention Henry. Lydia explains that he wasn't worth mentioning, but Alpha reminds her that he just risked his life to save her, so she must be lying.

In Alexandria, Michonne finds herself at odds with other members of the community’s council, particularly with Siddiq and Gabriel; she was concerned about not learning of Rosita and Eugene's mission to establish a radio tower. Gabriel points out to Michonne that she frequently overrides their decisions, specifically disallowing Alexandria to participate in the Kingdom's upcoming fair over concerns for their safety. Meanwhile, Rosita's pregnancy with Siddiq's child continues. Both Gabriel and Eugene struggle with their own past romantic interests in Rosita. Eugene, evaluating his position logically, realizes that he likely has no chance, but encourages Gabriel to make efforts to continue to see Rosita, as it is clear the two love each other very much. Meanwhile, Michonne goes to check in on Negan, who has returned to his cell. Negan reveals he knows much of the situation due to gossip he hears outside his window as he tries to get Michonne to trust him.

The Whisperers soon arrive back at their camp, unaware that Daryl and Connie are searching for Henry in the woods, and are following their tracks. At the camp, Alpha taunts a secured Henry and explains to him why they disguise themselves as walkers, as the strong adapt while the weak die. Two whisperers, Sean and Helen, approach Alpha and question why they gave up two people for her daughter. Alpha reminds them that she did it to get information, but Sean issues a challenge for her leadership role. In response, Alpha confirms that he has the right to challenge her position, but that she also has the right to defend it. Knowing that it was Helen that has been sowing seeds of discontent within the group, Alpha grabs Helen and decapitates her with a piece of wire. She then hands the head over to Sean before fatally stabbing him in the stomach, as Henry looks on in horror. Privately, Alpha tells Beta a story about Lydia when she was three years old. They both then agree that Henry can be useful and that they need to find out if Lydia truly has feelings for him. On a field, two Whisperers draw a herd to devour the couple's corpses as Daryl and Connie watch nearby.

Michonne returns to her home to chastise Judith, as she has been talking with Negan, but Judith insists that Negan has changed. Michonne refuses to believe that people can change until Judith points out that Michonne changed. While upset at Judith, Michonne takes this advice to heart and goes to tell Aaron that she will not overrule a vote to allow Alexandria to participate in the fair, even though she thinks it is still a bad idea.

At night, Beta takes Henry to Alpha. Unmasked, Alpha drops her knife and makes Lydia pick it up, commanding her to kill Henry with it so that she can prove what side she's on; Lydia picks up the knife and begins to cry. Her mother warns her not to be weak and that Beta will kill them both if she doesn't kill Henry. Suddenly, a small horde of walkers show up and begin eating the unmasked Whisperers, creating mass confusion. Alpha and the others quickly put on their masks so that they can try to lure the herd away. Moments later, Daryl and Connie arrive disguised as Whisperers to free and rescue Henry. Daryl grabs Henry, who grabs Lydia, and together the four escape.

== Production ==
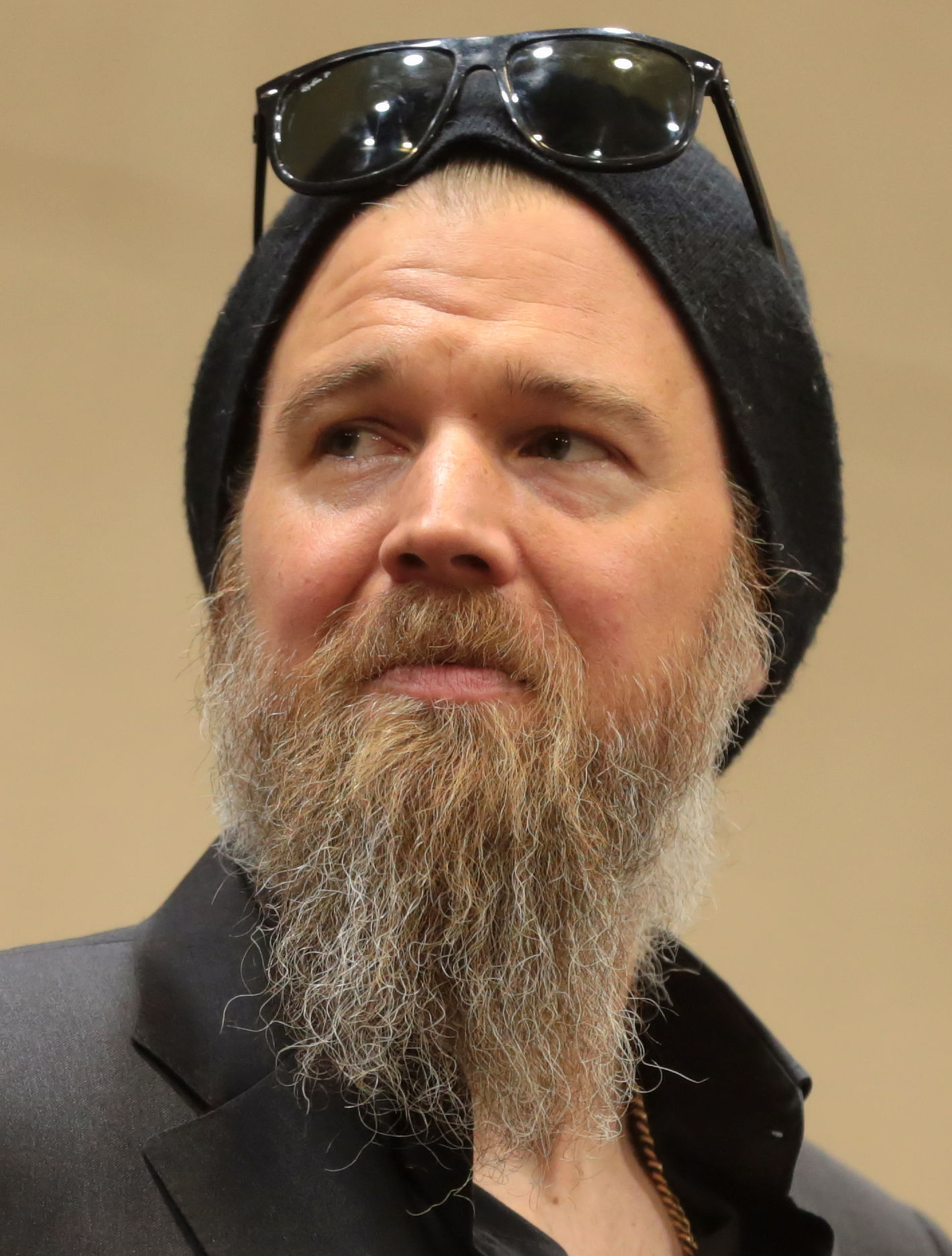
This episode marks the debut of Ryan Hurst as Beta, the second-in-command of the Whisperers.

This episode introduces Ryan Hurst as Beta, the second-in-command of the Whisperers; his casting was first announced in August 2018. Beginning with this episode, Tom Payne (Paul "Jesus" Rovia) is removed from the opening credits.

== Reception ==
=== Critical reception ===
"Guardians" received positive reviews from critics. On Rotten Tomatoes, the episode has an approval rating of 82% with an average score of 6.78 out of 10, based on 17 reviews. The critical consensus reads: "'Guardians' presents dual stories of tested leadership with thematic resonance and provides the malevolent Alpha a plump opportunity to demonstrate her villainy -- although The Walking Dead is still withholding crucial context from viewers longing to understand the motivations of their heroes."

=== Ratings ===
"Guardians" received a total viewership of 4.71 million with a 1.7 rating in adults aged 18–49. It was the highest-rated cable program of the night and improved in viewership from the previous week.
