= Connie (The Walking Dead) =

Fictional character in "The Walking Dead"

- The Walking Dead character
- Connie, as she appears in the comic book series (left) and as portrayed by Lauren Ridloff on the television series (right)
- First appearance: Comic: "Issue #127" (2014); Television: "What Comes After" (2018)
- Last appearance: Comic: "Issue #191" (2019); Television: "Rest in Peace" (2022)
- Created by: Robert Kirkman
- Adapted by: Angela Kang (The Walking Dead)
- Portrayed by: Lauren Ridloff

In-universe information
- Occupation: Comic: Member of the Militia; Television: Journalist
- Family: Television: Kelly (sister)
- Significant others: Comic: Kelly (boyfriend)

Connie is a fictional character in the comic book series The Walking Dead and on the television series of the same name, where she is portrayed by Lauren Ridloff. In both universes, Connie is part of a small group of roaming survivors who are led by Magna. She is the first deaf character in the Walking Dead universe, and the actress who plays her on the television series, Lauren Ridloff, is also deaf.

== Appearances ==
=== Comic book series ===
Connie is part of a group of survivors from Richmond who joins the Alexandria Safe-Zone two years after the fall of Negan and the Saviors. At the beginning of the apocalypse, Connie is one of many survivors who arrive at a nursing home near Washington D.C. As they moved through the east side of Washington, a massive herd of walkers that was being routed by Jesus and other residents of Alexandria took Magna's group by surprise, causing them to lose their trailer and other belongings, as well as one of its members.

After being rescued and taken to Alexandria, Connie and her group were interviewed by Rick and Andrea in order to allow them to stay, and although at first they felt comfortable with the community they soon began to distrust the idyllic life they led. When Rick is absent in Alexandria, Connie and the group discover a prison. They find Negan, who tells them that Rick and his people are animals that torture him and begs them to release him, but Magna refused as she knew that Negan was lying.

During the war against the Whisperers, like Magna, Connie was a very important member of the militia, helping them win the war against the Whisperers.

=== Television series ===
==== Season 9 ====
Connie appears for the first time in the episode "What Comes After" while escaping from a herd of walkers. Connie, like the rest of her group, defended themselves from the walkers while trying to escape, although they ended up being surrounded by them and subsequently rescued by an unknown person. Making their way through the wood, Connie and her group went into the forest and discovered a little girl who had rescued them; she later introduced herself as Judith Grimes.

In the episode "Who Are You Now?", after meeting the rest of Judith's group and being taken to her community, the arrival of Connie and her group was not well received by Michonne, who reminded Aaron that he did not have the right to allow other groups to enter Alexandria, but eventually she reluctantly agreed that the fate of newcomers in the community would be decided by the council. Inside Father Gabriel's church, Connie and her group were questioned about their profession before the outbreak began and the things they did to survive; and, despite making good impressions on the council members with their responses, the story told by Magna was questioned by Michonne, who showed that the woman had spent a long time in prison from the tattoos she had on her hand and, if that was not enough, she forced her to deliver the knife she had hidden in her belt. The council then decided that newcomers will be allowed to stay in the community for one night in order to rest and leave the next day; and while they settled in their temporary home, Connie criticized Magna's way of thinking about her guests and strongly opposed her plan to take all the supplies of the community before leaving. The next day, as they prepared to return to the weather, Connie thanked Judith between signs for everything she had done for her group, and before she could leave the community, Michonne arrived just in time to inform Connie and her group that would undertake the trip to another safe place where they would be allowed to live.

In the episode "Stradivarius", as they made their way to the Hilltop, Connie and the rest of her group made a stop at the place where they were attacked by the herd of walkers and took advantage of the moment to collect all their stuff that they had left behind when they escaped from the herd - among them Bernie's belongings - with which Yumiko tried to convince Magna to take them as a souvenir to her late friend. When Michonne declared that all the weapons they found from Magna's group would be taken by their group, causing Magna to become hostile as she is against the woman's decision, Yumiko became the voice of reason in the middle of the discussion and proposed to her entire group to accept Michonne's terms instead of starting a fight. After spending the night in an abandoned factory and suddenly being ambushed by a pack of walkers, Connie claimed her weapons to defend herself and with the use of her bow, she ended up with several walkers that crossed her path; making their way to the horses to escape the undead and finding the zombified Bernie among them. Back on the highway, Connie along with Yumiko try to comfort Magna after witnessing their friend turned into a walker, and also were comforted by Michonne, who confessed that she understood the pain of losing someone she considered part of the family.

In the episode "Evolution", after arriving at the Hilltop and reluctantly surrendering their weapons to enter, the fate of Connie and her group within the walls was put on hold by Tara, who informed the newcomers that they could settle in their facilities while they waited for the Jesus' arrival to make a final decision regarding if they could stay in the community. While discussing the strange nickname of the community's leader, Connie and her group met Carol, who personally introduced herself to her with sign language.

In the episode "Omega", after discovering in the wood the horses that belonged to Luke and Alden who were missing, Connie and her friends were surprised by several walkers who emerged from the woods and without further choice were forced to return to Hilltop for their safety, except for Kelly, who in tears opposed the idea and remembering the time Luke rescued them in Coalport and was later comforted by his sister, who ordered Magna and Yumiko to move forward without them while helping Kelly to recover. Once arrived to the community, Connie separated from her sister when she was captured and escorted by the guards, Connie saw the arrival of Alpha and her group at the gates of the community who demanded that they have to give her her daughter. She then decided to hide herself in the cornfield as she didn't make it in time to get inside the Hilltop.

In the episode "Bounty", hidden in the cornfield, Connie watches as Alpha signals for more Whisperers to show up and nearly gets spotted by a Whisperer until they walk away. Later, Connie watches as a herd arrives and Alpha instructs her people to draw them away. Luke spots Connie in the cornfields and signs behind his back for her to keep quiet. Suddenly, a Whisperer's baby starts crying, which attracts the walkers over. Alpha shrugs at the mother, indicating she should leave the baby to die. Alden and Luke scream for them not to but Alpha explains it's natural selection. Luke frantically signs Connie to grab the baby. Connie runs out of the cornfield, sling-shots a walker, and grabs it. The Whisperers around her unsheathe blades as Connie escapes back into the cornfield. Daryl runs in and kills the walkers around her while Kelly, Tammy, and Earl step in to rescue her. She is then escorted inside Hilltop. At night, Connie watches in thought as her companions drink and celebrate Luke's safety. A while later, she goes outside and sits by a table to write something. Suddenly, she notices Daryl getting ready to leave and stops him. He explains he is going in search of Henry and she writes him a note, claiming that she wants to tag along. Daryl reluctantly agrees and they set off.

In the episode "Guardians", in the woods, Connie and Daryl look for Henry and realize that the Whisperers caught up with him. They kill some walkers and Daryl orders his dog to bring him the bolt back, but he refuses. Connie smiles as Daryl calls him a bad dog. Later, she and Daryl watch from some bushes as some Whisperers draw a herd to devour some corpses. At night, Connie and Daryl, dressed as Whisperers, lure the herd into the Whisperers' camp. In the middle of the chaos, Connie and Daryl grab Henry, who grabs Lydia, and together they escape.

In the episode "Chokepoint", back in the woods, following their daring escape from the Whisperers, Daryl blames Lydia for getting them into this mess and says she can't go with them back to Hilltop. Connie and Henry refuse to leave her behind and run off with her in another direction. Daryl reluctantly follows them. At dawn, Connie and Daryl devise a plan to use an office building as a means of separating the Whisperers from the undead. Lydia warns Daryl that Alpha's going to send Beta, who's their best fighter. "We'll kill him first", Daryl promises. Inside the office building, Connie reveals to Daryl that her group used the building to hide supplies and they argue about how they should proceed afterwards, with Connie saying Lydia should come back with them because they have more to lose than her. Later, Lydia spots a group of walkers/whisperers emerge from the bushes. In the middle of the group is Beta, who quietly instructs his people to spread out as Daryl shoots one of them with his crossbow. Beta and his people break in and quickly discover a trap meant to separate them from the dead. Meanwhile, Daryl makes Lydia hide in a closet as the Whisperers creep upstairs. Henry knocks one of them out as Connie slingshots another, before going to hunt down the others. Suddenly, a Whisperer stabs Henry in the leg, but is then tackled by Daryl's dog. Connie finishes it off as Lydia breaks out and goes to help Henry. Afterward, Connie draws the herd away with her slingshot and Daryl tells the others they're headed to Alexandria to get Henry help because it's closer. However, he doesn't intend to stay and they will instead keep moving on.

In the episode "Scars", Connie arrives at Alexandria with Daryl, Henry, and Lydia. From a guardpost, Michonne tells Daryl she's skeptical of Lydia but he assures her she's on their side. Inside, Connie tells Michonne that she's thankful to her for everything. At night, Connie, Daryl, Henry, and Lydia leave for the Kingdom. The next day, Connie, Daryl, Henry, and Lydia encounter Michonne and Judith in the woods and join them on their way towards the Kingdom.

In the episode "The Calm Before", Connie and the group arrive at the Kingdom as the fair starts. She runs to her sister and hugs her, before embracing her whole group. Later, Connie says goodbye to Yumiko and Magna as they prepare to leave the Kingdom to go to Hilltop and leave some soldiers in case of a possible attack. She also says goodbye to Daryl and promises him to watch after his dog until he returns. In the fair, Connie apologizes to Kelly for leaving in a rush and confess she saved the baby because she still hasn't moved on from a past trauma. Later, Connie and Kelly try to help Earl look for Tammy around the fair. The next day, in the Kingdom, Connie is in the crowd as Siddiq delivers the tragic news, tells them how brave everyone was in their final moments and how he was intentionally kept alive to tell this very story. He encourages everyone to remember the fallen.

==== Season 10 ====
In the season premiere "Lines We Cross", some months after the blizzard, Connie and the Coalition form a militia in order to train the several residents of the communities to face any future threats. She takes part in a training exercise on Oceanside beach. As Ezekiel and Jerry methodically release walkers from a shipwrecked boat, Connie and the other militia work together as a unit to take out the walker threat. Later on, Connie helps the Oceanside residents pull some fishing nets from the sea. Kelly tells Connie she's worried her gradual hearing loss will prevent her from translating for her. Connie assures her that she'll be okay and they should see their deafness as a superpower. Suddenly, Dog runs over with Daryl following behind. Kelly gives Connie a look suggesting she and Daryl are into each other, but Connie just rolls her eyes. Connie then walks to the dock to deliver Dog to Daryl with a note saying, "Think you lost something." He communicates with her in ASL. Connie is impressed and tells him that he signs with a southern accent. When Carol arrives on a boat, Connie greets her with a hug. That night, Connie and the others decide to cross Alpha's border to put out the fire and avoid it burning down Oceanside. They discover the remains of the satellite and start combating the fire. Some use water while others dig a means to prevent the fire from spreading until the morning arrives. The group runs out of water as a herd of walkers approaches the group. With their backs to the fire, the group prepares for a fight. Connie and the group take their formations and start fighting off the herd. As they keep killing the walkers, Daryl tosses an axe to cut a tree down and have it fall onto some walkers. Later, the fire is put out and everyone recovers. She then helps out Eugene scrap the fallen satellite for any valuable part.

In the episode "Silence the Whisperers", Connie is alerted to the commotion of a tree falling onto a house and a portion of Hilltop's walls. Luke wonders if the Whisperers are responsible, and Connie is left thinking about that. She then helps the other residents rescue the trapped injured from the rubble. The next day, the residents realize that a small herd has arrived outside the community walls. Connie and a group head outside to fight them off. That night, Connie and the other residents kill the incoming walkers with the help of the Alexandria convoy when the herd invades the community. The following morning, Connie hugs Luke goodbye advising him to be safe as he rides with the parting group towards Oceanside and watches as they leave the community.

In the episode "What It Always Is", Connie helps serve food to the residents as she notices Daryl and Siddiq arriving at the Hilltop. When the hunting group returns, Connie expresses concern about Kelly's whereabouts. Oscar informs that she volunteered to stay back and she would return later. Connie looks concerned as Daryl listens nearby. Later that day, Connie and Daryl search for Kelly around the woods. As Connie grows worried for her sister, Daryl tells her a story about how he saved his brother Merle from drowning during a fishing trip but was chastised for not getting the beer off the lake. They laugh over the story and hold hands. Suddenly, Dog finds the remains of a boar. They hear a noise behind them and find Magna. Sometime later, the group manages to find an exhausted Kelly lying under a tree. As they give her water, Kelly insists to Magna they tell Daryl and Connie about the supplies they've been taking. Daryl is mad about them hiding the supplies and Connie suggests they lie and say they found it in the woods. When the group later arrives back at Hilltop, Connie informs Yumiko of the recent events. That night, Connie finds Daryl as he is preparing to head back to Alexandria and apologizes for involving him with Kelly and Magna's lie. He claims to understand because they are her family. She then says she considers him family too and smiles as he drives off, however, her smile quickly drops.

In the episode "The World Before", Connie is part of the group from Hilltop to meet up with Daryl, Carol, and Aaron in the woods to go find the horde following Gamma's intel. When Daryl thanks her for helping, she smiles and pulls out a pre-written note saying "anything for us". That night, the group crosses one of the borders in the woods to continue their mission. The next day, the group arrives at the location of the horde in a clearing only to find it's empty, so they leave to go search for the missing Lydia. When Carol chases after Alpha into a dark building, Connie and the others follow her inside. The group then falls below a cave into a trap where they find themselves surrounded by most of the herd.

In the episode "Squeeze", Connie and Magna are trapped in the cave when a dynamite explosion collapses the exit. In the episode "Walk With Us," Magna makes her way back to Hilltop and reveals that she and Connie had escaped by using walker guts to hide among the herd. However, they got separated and Magna doesn't know if Connie survived or not.

In the episode "A Certain Doom", Virgil finds an exhausted but still alive Connie near Oceanside.

==== Season 11 ====
In "Out of the Ashes", Keith, a surviving Whisperer, reveals to Carol, Lydia, Aaron and Jerry that his group had seen Connie alive recently and he directs them to the area.

In "On the Inside," Kelly begins a frantic search for her sister with the help of Carol, Magna, Aaron and Rosita. Kelly manages to locate Connie's abandoned camp where she discovers that Connie is being chased by an unknown force and had been trapped walking with the horde for days before she had eventually managed to escape.

At the same time, Connie and Virgil take cover from a herd inside of an old house. There, they are ambushed throughout the house by feral cannibalistic survivors who attempt to feed upon them. Virgil is wounded in the fighting and insists that Connie abandon him and leave, revealing his encounter with Michonne to her, but Connie refuses. Finally, cornered, Connie covers herself in walker guts and lets the herd in which proceeds to devour most of the Ferals while ignoring Connie and Virgil thanks to the walker guts. Escaping outside, Kelly arrives just in time to save Connie and Virgil from two surviving Ferals and the sisters are finally reunited. Connie and Virgil join the others in returning to Alexandria as a massive storm approaches.

In "For Blood," Connie joins Carol's group in defending Alexandria as the residents split up when the massive storm causes part of the damaged wall to fall and a herd to get in.

In "No Other Way," Connie and the others successfully manage to fix the damage and eliminate the walker herd that got in. Shortly thereafter, Connie is finally reunited with a delighted Daryl.

After contact is established with the Commonwealth, Connie moves there along with most of her friends where Connie gets a job as a journalist with Kelly acting as her sign language interpreter. An amused Connie reveals to her friends that she had once exposed Commonwealth Governor Pamela Milton's uncle for corruption and gotten him kicked out of Congress. Following the disappearance of Tyler Davis after an altercation at a party, Connie and Kelly are secretly passed a list of hundreds of people who have been made to disappear by the Milton family. Connie plays a pivotal role in the plan to orchestrate an uprising against Pamela, writing an article about how Sebastian Milton's greed got thirty to forty people killed as they don't have enough information for Connie to write about the disappearances. The article sparks riots before Pamela manages to place the blame on Lance Hornsby.

After Sebastian's death, Pamela has everyone abducted and made to disappear. Connie manages to escape and alert Yumiko who tries and fails to follow Connie's attacker. Pamela later reveals to Yumiko that Connie has been found and captured. While observing the Commonwealth's supply train as part of their plan to follow it their missing friends, Daryl and Carol observe Connie being transferred to the train and overhear a conversation that reveals that Connie has been given Designation 2, separating her out from the others. Although reminded of losing Connie after the cave explosion, they are unable to act without risking their whole plan. Joined by an escaped Maggie, Gabriel and Rosita, the group learns from a dying soldier that Designation 2s are taken far away and never seen again. As a result, the group lays an ambush for the train, killing the guarding soldiers and rescuing Connie. Although the engineer commits suicide rather than reveal any information, Rosita manages to trick a friendly trooper over the radio into revealing that everyone has been taken a forced labor camp at the Commonwealth-occupied Alexandria. Connie joins Daryl in sneaking into the community through the sewers where they are able to subdue the sadistic Warden who is using Kelly as a hostage. Connie and the others return to the Commonwealth to overthrow Pamela and are finally reunited with Tyler Davis whom they had been searching for since his disappearance, expressing understanding over his actions. However, as a herd overruns the Commonwealth, the group is both reunited with and loses Luke who dies from a walker bite. After Pamela is overthrown, Connie joins the others in destroying the herd and saving the Commonwealth.

A year later, Connie continues to live in the Commonwealth and work as a reporter. Connie tells a visiting Daryl that she intends to keep the new administration, led by now-Governor Ezekiel Sutton, honest through her work.

== Development and reception ==
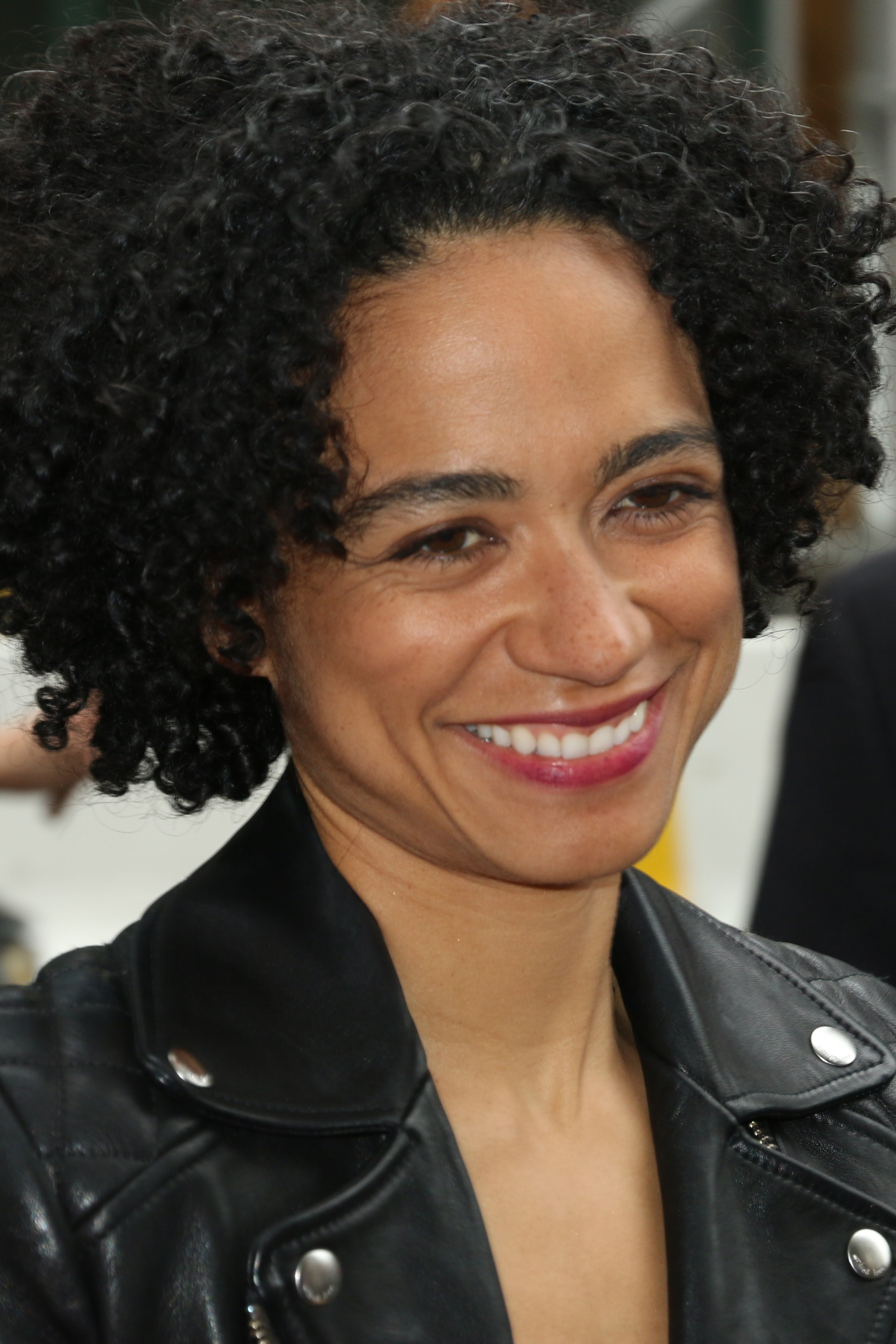
Lauren Ridloff portrays Connie

Connie is portrayed by Lauren Ridloff. The character entered the recurring cast beginning with the episode "What Comes After" of the ninth season. However, Lauren Ridloff was promoted to a series regular starting the tenth season.

Dalton Ross of Entertainment Weekly praised Connie's character and said: "Connie has been described as 'a seasoned survivor deft at using her senses to read people, situations, and trouble.' Her character is deaf and uses American Sign Language (ASL) to communicate."

Liam Mathews of TV Guide praised the development of Connie's character in the episode "Omega" and said: "Connie quickly proved her mettle during one of the season's best action sequences, rescuing an abandoned, crying baby from walkers and running into a zombie-infested cornfield. We experienced the scene from Connie's point of view, which added a thrilling dimension to the sequence, since we couldn't hear the zombies sneaking up on her. It was something that couldn't be done with a hearing character and opened up new possibilities for types of Walking Dead action scenes, an impressive feat for a show nine seasons in."

The current showrunner of the series Angela Kang also expressed her praise on the scene that rescued the newborn from the Whisperers' herd and said: "We just wanted to feel how scary that is and how capable she is, and how much she cares, in the moment, for saving this baby, that she would risk herself when she could have just stepped back."

Writing for Fan Fest News, Casey Perriccio praised Ridloff and said: "Ridloff quickly became a fan favorite on The Walking Dead when she joined the series in season 9. As the spunky, kind-hearted and brave Connie, Ridloff's performance has brought a softness to the show. She's the first deaf character audiences have been introduced to in The Walking Dead universe and has taken that role on with stride. Other projects for Ridloff include guest spots in series such as Legacies and New Amsterdam. She joins fellow Walking Dead star Danai Gurira in the MCU. Gurira first appeared in Black Panther and recently in Avengers: Endgame."
