= Beta (The Walking Dead) =

- The Walking Dead character
- Beta, as he appears in the comic book series (left) and as portrayed by Ryan Hurst in the television series (right)
- First appearance: Comic: "Issue #154" (2016); Television: "Guardians" (2019)
- Last appearance: Comic: "Issue #173" (2017); Television: "A Certain Doom" (2020)
- Created by: Robert Kirkman
- Adapted by: Angela Kang (The Walking Dead)
- Portrayed by: Ryan Hurst

In-universe information
- Alias: Half Moon
- Occupation: Second-in-Command of the Whisperers; De Facto Leader of the Whisperers; Comic: NBA Player; Actor; Television: Country Musician

Beta is a fictional character in the comic book series The Walking Dead and the television series of the same name, where he was portrayed by Ryan Hurst. In both universes, Beta is the second-in-command of the Whisperers, a group of survivors who wear walker (zombie) skin to hide their presence from actual walkers. He serves as Alpha's right-hand man and after her death, becomes de facto leader of the Whisperers.

Also in both universes, Beta is a famous celebrity before the apocalypse; in the comic books, he was a basketball player and an actor, and in the television series it was revealed in an episode of the companion series, Fear the Walking Dead (where Hurst made an uncredited cameo appearance), that he was a country musician as he was seen on the cover of an album that was released before the apocalypse, and it is later revealed in the main TV series that his stage name was "Half Moon".

== Appearances ==
=== Comic book series ===
Beta is Alpha's right-hand man who carries two knives. In an encounter with Michonne and Aaron, Beta stabs Aaron and attempts to kill Michonne until Dwight and several members of the Militia save them. Upon arriving at the Whisperers' camp, he confronts Negan for lying and attempts to kill him; however, Beta is thwarted by Alpha. In response to the untimely death of Alpha, Beta takes a leadership position and declares war on the communities. During the war, he kills Gabriel and several other members of the Militia. He eventually fights Negan to get revenge for Alpha's death, but is injured after Negan bashes "Lucille" on his back several times. Near the end of the war, he and few other Whisperers unleash a large herd of walkers on Alexandria. In a decisive fight, while Beta is fighting against Jesus, Aaron shoots him through the chest. He then blacks out as they pull off his mask and recognize him as a famous celebrity.

=== Television series ===
==== Season 9 ====
Beta appears for the first time in the episode "Guardians" when he discovers Henry following the Whisperers in order to save Lydia; he grabs Henry and presents the boy to Alpha. That night, Alpha orders her daughter to execute Henry with a knife to prove which side she is on, but Lydia refuses and Alpha then orders Beta to execute them both. Suddenly, the appearance of several walkers in the camp puts the camp in chaos; Alpha and Beta went to help the others. Moments later, Daryl and Connie, who created the distraction, arrive unnoticed to rescue Henry. However, they also take Lydia at Henry's insistence. In the episode "Chokepoint", Beta comforts a dying Whisperer, and then takes a group of Whisperers and walkers with him to go find Lydia on Alpha's orders. The next morning, the group manages to spot them in an abandoned building. Beta and his team quickly break in, and discover a trap meant to separate them from the dead. Soon after, Daryl and Beta have a one-on-one duel in which Beta announces that all he wants is "the girl". However, Daryl manages to shove Beta down an elevator shaft. Shortly after, Beta rises in pain and peers up, enraged, and covered in blood, with his bottom front teeth having been knocked out from the more than two-story fall. In the episode "The Calm Before", a group of walkers ambush Daryl, Michonne, Carol and Yumiko during the night; they take them out one by one until a group of Whisperers surround them. Beta, who managed to find a way out of the elevator shaft, emerges from the trees and orders the group to drop their weapons. He then approaches and growls at Daryl, who is taken by surprise since he thought Beta was dead, and reminds Daryl that all he had to do was hand over Lydia and that this initial deal is now off. Back at the camp, after Alpha showed Daryl what her people are capable of doing if they ever crossed their borders again, Beta approached Alpha to ask her about what happened with Lydia. He is only told by Alpha that she wanted to be left alone so that she can endure her pain by herself; Beta obeys and leaves her alone. In the season finale "The Storm", a few months have passed since the massacre at the fair. After surviving a great storm that swept through the Whisperers' entire territory, the Whisperers proceed to reassemble their camp while Beta privately meets with a disconsolate Alpha; he informs her that the time away has been good for the pack. When this new information assures her, Alpha reminds Beta that she will need to be strong for what comes next; he assures her that she will be. Alpha then hands Beta a branch and stretches her left arm out. Beta, without hesitation, begins to wound her by whipping her arm with the branch to make her stronger.

==== Season 10 ====
In the episode "We Are the End of the World", it is discovered in flashbacks the origin and past of a then unstable Beta, and what happened before he formed the Whisperers with Alpha, who he meets in an abandoned sanatorium along with Lydia. However, they distrusted each other as they were getting to know each other, but after Alpha discovered Beta's face, both began to develop a mutual trust. In the present, Alpha orders Beta to collect more walkers from a nearby parking lot and take the two sisters (Mary and Frances) with him. In the garage, Beta attracts the walkers successfully, but Frances, whom Alpha had forced to leave her newborn at the Hilltop Colony, believes she hears a baby crying nearby and enters into a panic, causing the walkers to turn against them. Beta then rescues Frances and returns to camp without the walkers. There, Beta is ready to execute Frances, but Alpha instead takes Frances to talk privately where Frances cries and regrets her actions. Beta then begins worrying why Alpha chose not to punish Frances for showing weakness and wonders why they have not attacked the other communities yet. Later, Beta follows Alpha and discovers that she has made a small shrine for Lydia. Alpha then admits to an angered Beta that she lied about killing Lydia and that she is still alive, and breaks down telling Beta that she couldn't bring herself to kill her daughter. She then destroys the shrine and pleads with him to keep secret about Lydia being alive; Beta promises that he will. In the episode "What It Always Is", after a Whisperer defies Alpha's strategies, Beta tries to kill him but is stopped by Alpha. She then cuts the Whisperer on his arm and leg, and hands the knife to Beta, who approaches the injured Whisperer and slashes him on the back of his neck to finish the job. That night, Beta and a group of Whisperers arrive at one of their borders after hearing the yells of a man—Negan. Beta confronts and throws Negan to the ground before he can keep killing their walkers. In the episode "Bonds", Beta and the Whisperers escort a blindfolded Negan, who is interested in joining the Whisperers, through the woods after capturing him. When Negan keeps talking and making jokes, Beta puts his knives to Negan's throat and demands him to be quiet as he told him that he is too loud. Negan apologizes and introduces himself, explaining that he has been a prisoner of their enemy for eight years and is willing to reveal their secrets. Upon arriving at their camp, Beta argues with Alpha that Negan should be killed because he could not be trusted and that he doesn't belong with them. Alpha notes that Beta has been questioning her rather often lately and asks if he is finally challenging her. Beta kneels in submission and vows that he will never challenge her; Alpha forgives him. Later that day, Beta forces Negan to do a series of tasks, including digging graves, skinning walkers and help hunt a wild boar to prove his worthiness. That night, Beta tells Negan that he has not earned the right to eat with them and throws him to the ground. He then notices in anger as another Whisperer shares some of his meal with Negan. A while later, Beta takes Negan to walk among one of their herds in the woods as his final task. However, after Beta unleashed anger again upon hearing more jokes from Negan, Beta assured Negan that he'll never be one of them because he's too loud and weak. Beta then kills the Whisperer that shared his meal with Negan in response and walks away, leaving Negan to fend for himself with only a pocket knife. The next morning, Beta returns to the camp and informs Alpha that Negan died because he was weak, but is suddenly left in shock when a blood-covered Negan arrives back and kneels in front of Alpha to introduce himself and offer his loyalty to her. He then watches Alpha as she accepts Negan.

In the mid-season premiere "Squeeze", while he was guarding the camp, Beta was informed by Alpha that the enemy had crossed the border to go to the national park where the entire horde was and listened carefully as their leader instructed Gamma to go to the border to inform his spies about the situation. However, when the girl never reached her destination, Alpha began to suspect that the traitor was actually her and ordered Beta to track her down, who alleged that he would murder her for what he had done but her wishes were quickly refuted by Alpha, who assured that she would personally punish her in front of the entire herd. In the episode "Stalker", Beta enters Alexandria in the middle of the night through an underground tunnel that one of his spies had created, Beta proceeded to brutally murder several Alexandrians who were in their homes and patiently waited for them to reanimate into walkers as a way to create a distraction to be able to search for Gamma without any problem. Locating the girl inside a cell, Beta ordered her to surrender ensuring that her death would be painless in case she did not fight him but before he could accomplish his task, Laura's arrival allowed Mary to escape and Beta was threatened by the woman with a spear. However, the whisperer managed to get rid of his adversary and quickly followed his prey to the Grimes' house, where he began to search for each room until he was shot down by Judith in the chest. Surviving the little girl's attack thanks to his bulletproof vest, Beta once again faced more of her enemies and while preparing to end Rosita's life, the man was interrupted when Mary threatened to commit suicide if he did not leave his opponent alone. And finally to avoid further slaughter, the girl accepted the fate that awaited her and surrendered to the big man. Despite having fulfilled his mission to capture the deserter, the trip back to the camp was nevertheless frustrated with the arrival of a group of Alexandrians, who without thinking twice opened fire on Beta and the whisperer had no choice but to leave Gamma back to save his life. In the episode "Morning Star", Beta has declared war on the communities, and was tasked with extracting sap from various trees and later commanded his men through the horde on their way to Hilltop. Once arrived at the community, Beta took full charge of his group's battle tactics, devising a clever plan that consisted of spraying their enemies with sap and using flaming arrows to set fire to everything in their path. In the episode "Walk with Us", Beta observes the remnants of the battle and wiping out the remaining survivors, Beta realized that Alpha was not satisfied with all the destruction he had caused because he had not found his daughter and personally offered to search for her in the surroundings. In the process, Beta found Mary wiping out a few walkers and quickly stabbed her in the belly, but she futilely tried to attack the deranged man by removing part of his mask and eventually died in his hands. What happened was contemplated by a whisperer, who confessed to Beta that he recognized him but before he could continue speaking, Beta killed him. Waiting for Mary to reanimate as a walker, Beta did not have time to take her with his group when Alden finished her off from a distance, and noting that he was at a disadvantage, he escaped in terror.

In the episode "Look at the Flowers", after finding Alpha's zombified head embedded in a pike, Beta flatly refused to occupy the woman's rank within The Whisperers and punished one of his companions who proclaimed him their leader. While walking through an abandoned town in search of new walkers for his horde, Beta entered a bar where several pieces of music were found and while inspecting him he found several memories of his time as a singer; destroying all traces that made him face his past. However, after reflecting on everything he had that made him remember his professional career, Beta decides to listen to a recording of one of his concerts on the record player and, in turn, took the opportunity to attract all the walkers who were in the zone. After thanking the walker Alpha for all she had done for him, Beta ended her miserable existence and removed part of the woman's face to replace the part of his mask that had been damaged; subsequently guiding the gigantic horde of walkers towards their enemies. In the episode "The Tower", Beta and the Whisperers as a new leader, has finally brought the horde to Alexandria, but finds it apparently empty. Meanwhile, as the horde sweeps Alexandria, Beta watches from the base of the mill. As he discusses his next assault with the other Whisperers, Beta hears voices in his head, then informed the other Whisperers that they will head towards Oceanside. Unbeknownst to him, Alden is checking him out from the top floor of the mill, who is communicating information to Aaron through signs. Beta almost discovers Alden, but finally decides to take the retreat. Beta is seen leading the horde towards Oceanside, but suddenly stops when he feels something is wrong. He complains that the survivors are not stupid and begins to suspect that they are leading them into a trap. Another Whisperer tries to reassure Beta, but in doing so, he accidentally calls him "Alpha". Despite her remorse, Beta prepares to kill the Whisperer, but the voice in his head stops him. Beta asks the voice to show him the way, but urges him to be patient and have faith in his strength. With that, Beta continues on with the horde, at the leadership of the horde and The Whisperers, Beta talks to himself and continues to hear voices in his head. Just then, he sees a cat crossing the street. The voice is now manifested in a walker marching alongside Beta, who tells him that faith will be rewarded. Beta laughs tortuously. Beta has finally arrived at the Tower with the horde and its minions. He begins to sing and hallucinates the walkers too.

In "A Certain Doom," Beta continues to lead the herd and the Whisperers, but Daryl and several others infiltrate the horde using the walker guts trick and draw the horde away with a sound system hooked up to a wagon. The Whisperers eventually manage to destroy the wagon, forcing Daryl's group to infiltrate the horde once again and take out the Whisperers one by one. Spotting Lydia steering the herd away, Beta begins to follow her, but is confronted by Negan. Taking the former leader of the Saviors down, Beta prepares to kill him in revenge for the death of Alpha, but is attacked by Daryl who stabs Beta through both eyes. Beta flashes back on his life as a Whisperer before he is devoured by the horde, a fate he gladly accepts. As Beta is devoured, his mask is ripped off, shocking Negan who recognizes who Beta really is, though Daryl simply calls him "nobody." With Beta and the Whisperers gone, Carol and Lydia are able to lead the horde over a cliff, ending their threat once and for all.

In a flashback in "Here's Negan," Negan's wife Lucille is wearing a "Half Moon" T-shirt, revealing that Negan and his wife were fans of Beta when he was a musician.

=== Fear the Walking Dead ===
==== Season 5 ====
In the episode "Today and Tomorrow", a photo of Beta, on his records, before the apocalypse is seen being carried by Daniel Salazar, but he is forced to abandon them after walkers attack.

== Development and reception ==
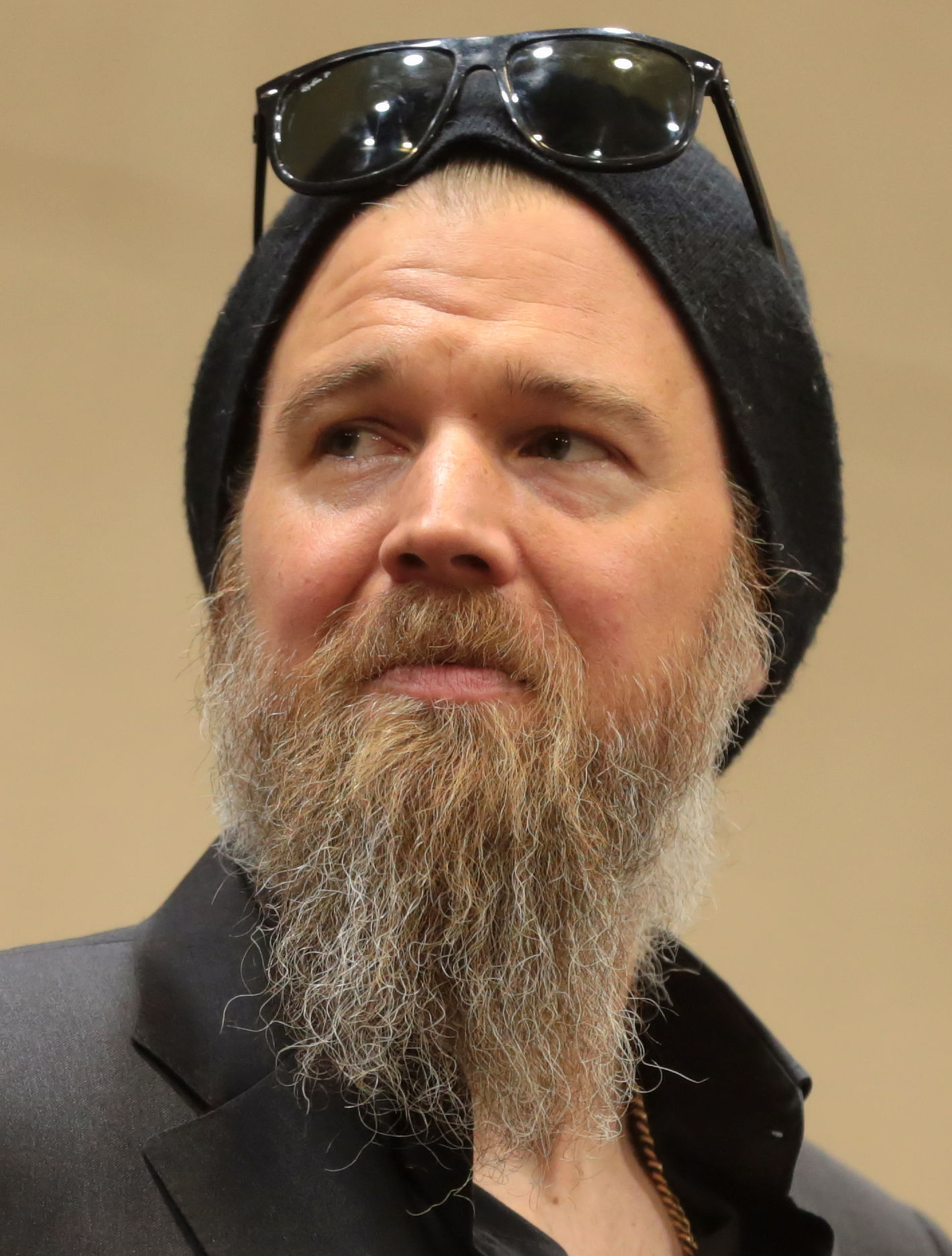
Ryan Hurst portrays Beta.

Beta is portrayed by Ryan Hurst. The character entered the recurring cast of the credits beginning with the episode "Guardians" of the ninth season. However, Hurst was promoted to a series regular starting the tenth season.

Erik Kain of Forbes praised the development of Hurst, writing: "Beta is pretty awesome. Ryan Hurst was a great casting choice and I have high hopes for his character. That zombie-skinning scene was pretty gross also." In his review for "Chokepoint", Kain wrote that "Beta is terrifying" and "that whole fight scene was just phenomenal." He went on to say that "'Chokepoint' was, for the most part, a fantastic episode. It's certainly the first episode of 9B that had me on the edge of my seat. Mostly that's because of Beta (Sons of Anarchy's Ryan Hurst) who is just wonderfully scary and intimidating. The guy is huge, for one thing (at 6'4" he's got an inch on me) and in his trenchcoat and walker skin he's quite the striking figure, whether shambling slowly with his "guardians" or charging through a wall to attack Daryl." In a review of the episode "Look at the Flowers" Kain praised the development of Hurst's character and wrote: "This was mostly a very good episode. Beta is a very scary guy, and the end suggests that the full force of his wrath and vengeance is about to be unleashed on our heroes".

Ron Hogan writing for Den of Geek praised Hurst's work and wrote: "Ryan Hurst is an excellent goon for Alpha, because what she lacks in physical prowess, he more than makes up for. What he lacks in organizational management, she more than makes up for by being the face and voice of the organization." He also positively commented on Ryan Hurst as Beta by the episode "Stalker", stating that he "does a brilliant job of simply lurking in the background of scenes like a true Michael Myers type."

Kirsten Acuna of Business Insider interviewed Hurst in which Hurst said: "Probably about a year ago, I had this premonition that I was going to be on the show. It was so strong that I actually called my agent and my manager, and I said, 'Hey, can you call over to The Walking Dead and tell them that I'd like to be on the show?'" Hurst said his agent and manager told him that's not exactly how it works, and that he needs to audition for the show, but Hurst was persistent. He then said: "'Yeah, yeah, yeah, I know, but just cold call the producers and say,' 'Hey, Ryan Hurst would like to be on the show,' and they did. And the producers got back to them and they said, 'No, he can't be on the show right now. We'll let you know.'"
