= Squeeze (The Walking Dead) =

- The Walking Dead episode
- Episode no.: Season 10; Episode 9
- Directed by: Michael E. Satrazemis
- Written by: David Leslie Johnson-McGoldrick
- Cinematography by: Jalaludin Trautmann
- Editing by: Alan Cody
- Original air date: February 23, 2020
- Running time: 45 minutes

Guest appearances
- Thora Birch as Gamma / Mary; Angel Theory as Kelly

Episode chronology
← Previous "The World Before"	Next → "Stalker"
- The Walking Dead season 10

"Squeeze" is the ninth episode and second-part premiere of the tenth season of the post-apocalyptic horror television series The Walking Dead, which aired on AMC on February 23, 2020. The episode was written by David Leslie Johnson-McGoldrick and directed by Michael E. Satrazemis.

After becoming trapped in a cave, the group must figure out how to get out of the precarious situation. Meanwhile, Negan (Jeffrey Dean Morgan) and Alpha (Samantha Morton) become closer to one another. The episode was acclaimed by critics.

== Plot ==
Daryl, Carol, Aaron, Jerry, Connie, Kelly, and Magna are in the cave surrounded by a gargantuan horde of walkers. Alpha watches from above; Carol screams in anger at her. The group begins to move through the cave looking for an exit. Carol soon begins to suffer from claustrophobia. During a rest break, Daryl chastises Carol for placing the entire group in danger. The group is soon attacked by a group of Whisperers, most of whom they kill except for a few who manage to escape.

At the Whisperers' camp, Alpha informs Beta and Gamma that the "enemy" has been watching them and has crossed the border, suspecting that there is a traitor among them and that the survivors must have been sending spies. Alpha then assigns more guards at the border and instructs Gamma to carry a message to the survivors at the border about the situation. The next morning, Negan suggests to Alpha that Gamma may be the traitor, but she threatens him and tells him to not spread paranoia among the camp. After learning that Gamma never reached her destination, Alpha begins to suspect that Negan may be correct. She then orders Beta to track Gamma down and bring her back to the camp. Beta vows to murder her for what she has done, but Alpha quickly assures that she will personally punish her in front of the Whisperers. Alpha later takes Negan, who believes she is going to kill him, deep into the forest. She then orders him to undress while she does as well, telling him that he is a "crass man" and reckons that he might appreciate a crass reward; the two proceed to kiss.

Daryl's group enters an old mine station where they find a possible exit and a box of dynamite. Carol goes back with a stick of dynamite intending to destroy the horde below. She nearly falls into the hole, but is saved by Daryl; however, she drops the dynamite and it explodes below. The cave begins to collapse as the group starts to exit through the mine station above, with Jerry supporting a beam to aid their escape. Kelly and Aaron escape, but are attacked by awaiting Whisperers, who they kill. Connie and Magna search for Daryl and Carol, and help them escape. Connie and Magna stay behind to protect Jerry from incoming walkers, but Jerry is unable to support the beam any longer and escapes through the hole; Connie and Magna become trapped, as the rest of the dynamite immediately explodes causing the cave to implode. Daryl tries to remove the debris, but Aaron and the others convince him that it would be an impossible task; Carol blames herself for what has happened. Daryl then orders everyone to go back to Alexandria and inform the others where the horde is while he searches for another entrance to the cave.

== Reception ==
=== Critical reception ===
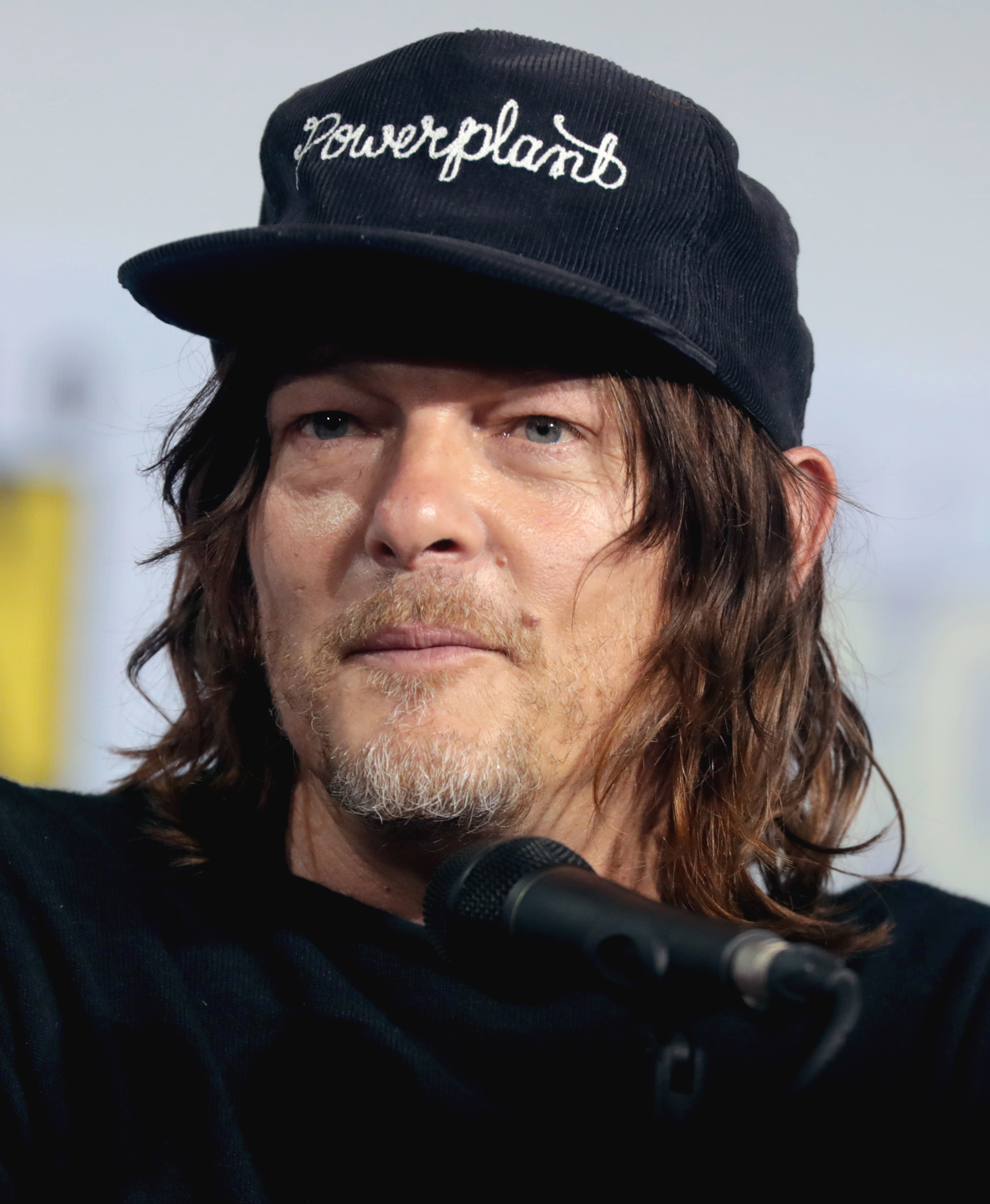
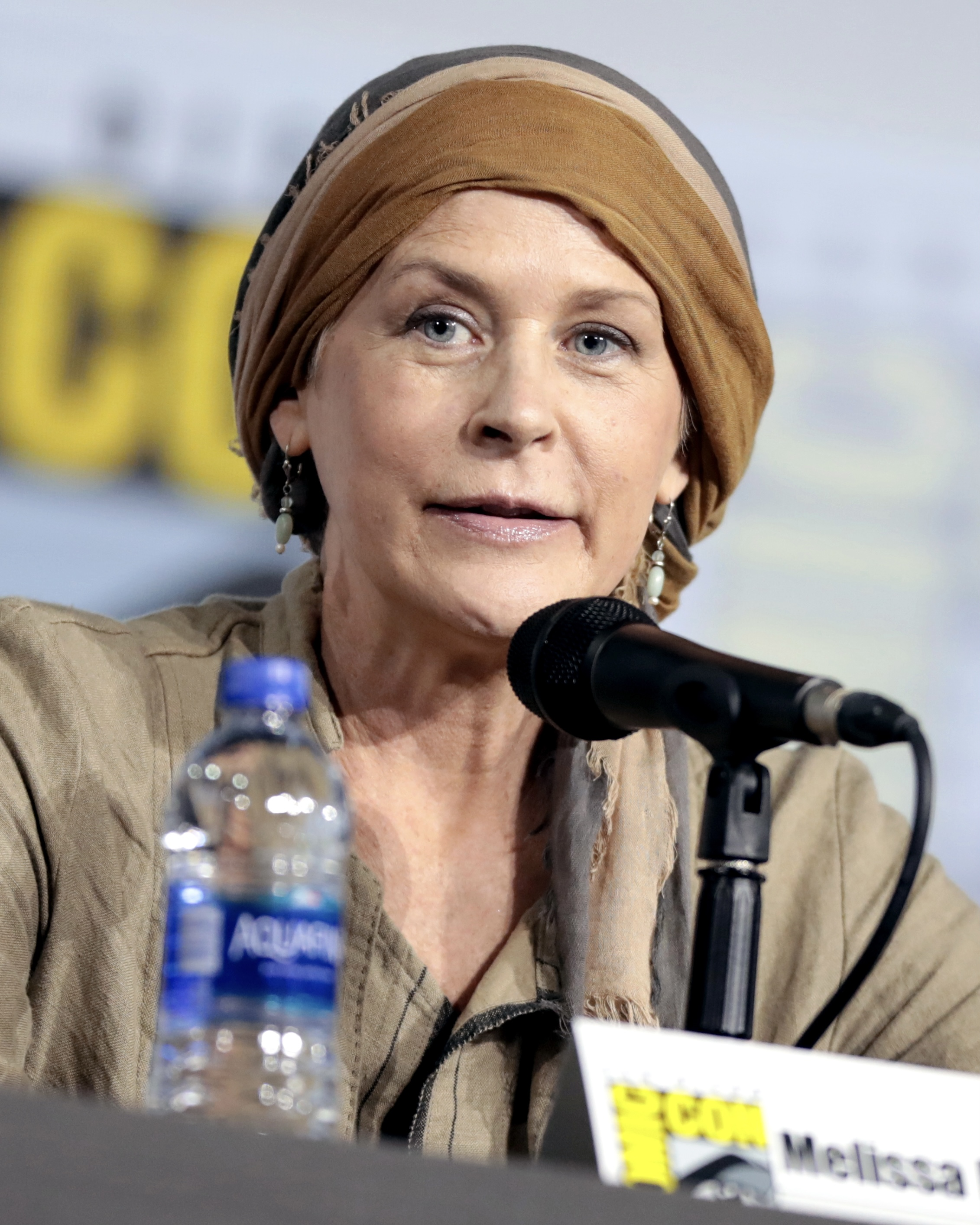
Norman Reedus (Daryl Dixon) and Melissa McBride's (Carol Peletier) performances were praised by critics.

"Squeeze" received positive reviews. On Rotten Tomatoes, the episode has an approval rating of 95% with an average score of 7.15 out of 10, based on 19 reviews. The site's critical consensus reads: "'Squeeze' returns viewers to the 10th season of TWD with a heart-stoppingly claustrophobic story that finds time to enrich the strong dynamic between Carol and Daryl." Ron Hogan of Den of Geek gave the episode a rating of 3 out of 5.

However, fans were grossed out and disturbed by the love scene between Negan (Jeffrey Dean Morgan) and Alpha (Samantha Morton). In an interview for Entertainment Weekly, showrunner Angela Kang explained: "I think it really tracks with who Alpha is. She's very survival of the fittest and nature's way is the right way. There is some hypocrisy in the things that she says sometimes, but I think that for the most part, she is a cult leader who's a true believer of her own word."

=== Ratings ===
"Squeeze" received a total viewership of 3.52 million, with a 1.2 rating in adults aged 18–49. It was the highest-rated cable program of the night and the most-watched episode of season ten after the premiere episode; however, it is the lowest-rated mid-season premiere episode of the series.
