= Ryan Hurst =

American actor (born 1976)

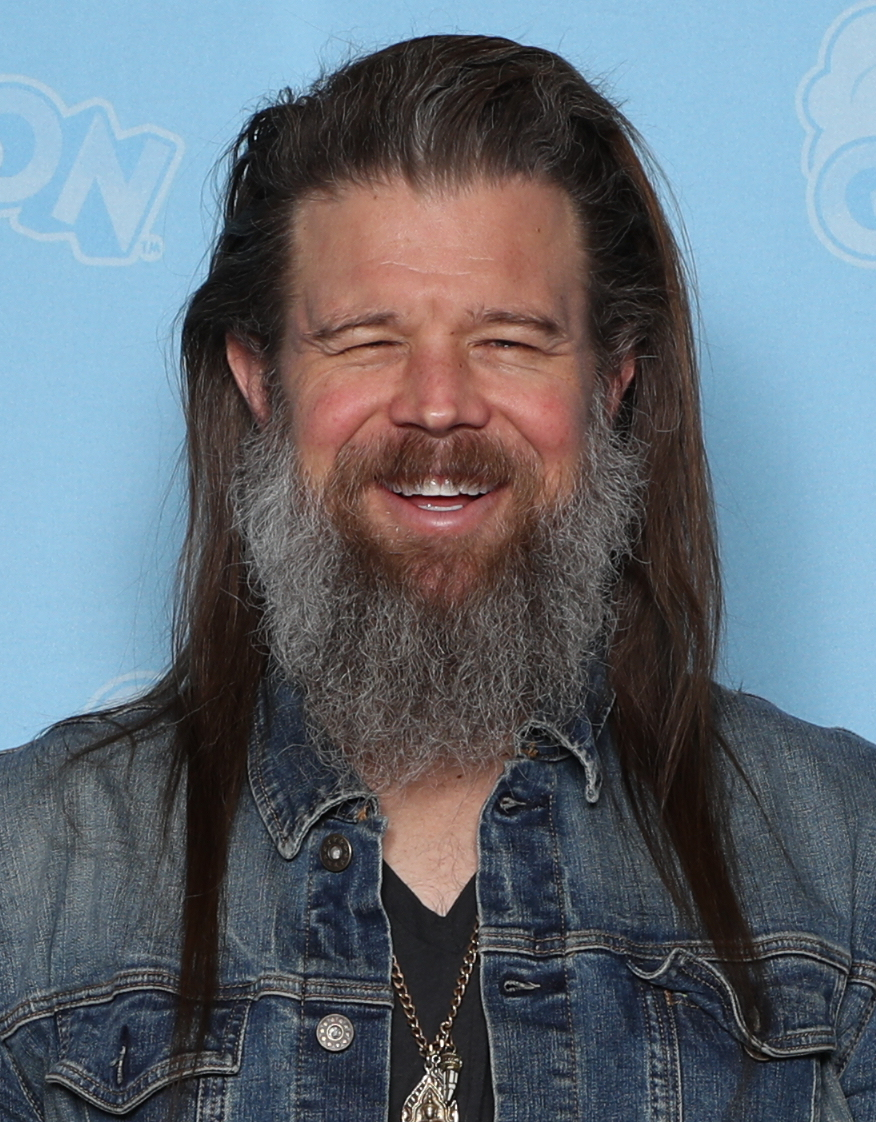
- Hurst in 2019
- Born: Ryan Douglas Hurst; June 19, 1976 (age 50); Santa Monica, California, U.S.
- Occupation: Actor
- Years active: 1993–present
- Spouse: Molly Cookson (m. 2005)
- Parent: Rick Hurst (father)

Ryan Douglas Hurst (born June 19, 1976) is an American actor. He is best known for his roles as Gerry Bertier in Remember the Titans (2000) and Opie Winston in the FX drama series Sons of Anarchy (2008–2012). He provided the voice for the Norse god Thor in the 2022 video game God of War Ragnarök, for which he received a BAFTA Award nomination. He also portrayed "Lil Foster" Farrell in the Outsiders (2016–2017) and Beta in the AMC horror drama series The Walking Dead (2019–2020).

== Early life ==
Hurst was born in Santa Monica, California, the son of Rick Hurst, an actor perhaps best known for playing Cletus on The Dukes of Hazzard, and Candace Kaniecki, an acting coach, who currently runs the Candace Kaniecki (Herman) Acting School. He attended Santa Monica High School.

== Career ==
Growing up in a Hollywood family, Hurst made a very early start in show business, with a recurring role in the NBC teen situation comedy series Saved by the Bell: The New Class. In the 1998 epic war film Saving Private Ryan, Hurst portrayed Michaelson, a paratrooper who, despite a temporary hearing loss, is able to communicate to Captain John H. Miller (Tom Hanks) the approximate location of Private Ryan. In 2000, Hurst followed this with a role in Rules of Engagement and the central supporting role of Gerry Bertier in Remember the Titans. Additionally, he appeared in the war film We Were Soldiers (2002) as Sgt. Ernie Savage, played the football player Lump Hudson in the black comedy thriller film The Ladykillers (2004), and starred in the TNT police drama series Wanted (2005). From 2005 to 2007, Hurst gained recognition for portraying the recurring role of Allison DuBois' half-brother, Michael Benoit, in NBC's supernatural procedural drama series Medium.

Hurst's big break came when he was cast as Opie Winston in the FX crime drama series Sons of Anarchy. Originally a recurring cast member in the first season, he was promoted to main cast member for the following season and went on to become a fan favorite. His character, newly released from a five-year prison stint and "living right", but not making ends meet, goes back to SAMCRO to provide for his family, despite his wife's objections and his knowing the risks. Hurst's portrayal of Opie earned him the Satellite Award for Best Supporting Actor – Series, Miniseries or Television Film in 2011. Also in 2011, Hurst voiced Jedidiah in the animated box office hit Rango. He also stars in the WGN America series Outsiders. In August 2018, it was announced that he would star as Beta on AMC's The Walking Dead. His debut episode, "Guardians", premiered on March 3, 2019.

In 2022, Hurst voiced Thor in the video game God of War Ragnarök and also provided the motion-capture.

In December 2024, Hurst was cast as a member in independent drama Out Come The Wolves based on the Rancid 1995 album of the same name.

In January 2026, he was announced to be returning to the God of War franchise, this time portraying the main character Kratos in the upcoming Amazon Prime Video live-action adaptation of the two Norse mythology-based games. However, in late June, Hurst injured his bicep during filming of the series, and as a result of his estimated recovery time, it was announced in July that the role would be recast.

In 2026, he appeared as the Ancient Greek character Mentor, guardian of Tom Holland's character Telemachus, in Christopher Nolan's The Odyssey.

== Personal life ==
Hurst and Molly Cookson met in 1994 and married in May 2005. Together, they founded the production company Fast Shoes. In April 2013, Hurst purchased a 3,400 square-foot home in Woodland Hills, California, for $1.71 million.

He converted to Sikhism and his Sikh name is Gobind Seva Singh.

== Filmography ==
=== Film ===
Year	Title	Role	Notes
1997	The Postman	Eddie March	
1998	Patch Adams	Neil	
1998	Saving Private Ryan	Paratrooper Michaelson	
2000	Rules of Engagement	Captain Hustings	
2000	Remember the Titans	Gerry Bertier	
2001	Perfect Lover	Guy	
2001	Venus and Mars	Roberto	
2002	We Were Soldiers	Sgt. Ernie Savage	
2002	Lone Star State of Mind	Tinker	
2004	The Ladykillers	Lump Hudson	
2006	Noble Things	Kyle Collins	
2008	Chasing the Green	Ross Franklin	
2011	Rango	Jedidiah	Voice
2014	CBGB	Mad Mountain	
2018	A Million Little Pieces	Hank	
2020	Superman: Man of Tomorrow	Lobo	Voice
2023	Desperation Road	Larry	
2026	The Odyssey	Mentor	
TBA	And Out Comes The Wolf †	TBA	Post-production

Key
†	Denotes films that have not yet been released

=== Television ===
Year	Title	Role	Notes
1993	Saved by the Bell: The New Class	Crunch Grabowski	2 episodes
1994	Beverly Hills, 90210	Student Actor	Episode: "Divas"
1995	JAG	Dirk Grover	Episode: "Shadow"
1995–1996	Campus Cops	Wayne Simko	9 episodes
1996	Boston Common	Nikolai	2 episodes
1996	Wings	Barry	Episode: "Too Beautiful for You"
1999	L.A. Doctors	Kevn Raives	2 episodes
2002	Touched by an Angel	Doug	Episode: "Two Sides to Every Angel"
2002	John Doe	Elvis Braithwaite	Episode: "Mind Games"
2002	Taken	Adult Tom Clarke	5 episodes
2004	Dr. Vegas	Steve	Episode: "All In"
2005	House	Sam McGinley	Episode: "The Mistake"
2005	Wanted	Agent Jimmy McGloin	13 episodes
2005–2007	Medium	Michael Benoit	3 episodes
2006	Everwood	Ed Carnahan	Episode: "Across the Lines"
2006	CSI: Miami	Detective Michael Lloyd	Episode: "Curse of the Coffin"
2007	Raines	Marco	Episode: "Pilot"
2007	Heartland	Mark Evans	Episode: "Pilot"
2008–2012	Sons of Anarchy	Harry "Opie" Winston	54 episodes
2011	Law & Order: Special Victims Unit	Doug Loveless	Episode: "Bombshell"
2013	King & Maxwell	Edgar Roy	10 episodes
2015	Axe Cop	Chupacabra	Voice, episode: "Night Mission: The Extincter"
2015–2017	Bates Motel	Chick Hogan	15 episodes
2016–2017	Outsiders	Li'l "Foster" Farrell	26 episodes
2019	Bosch	Hector Bonner	8 episodes
2019	Fear the Walking Dead	Beta	Episode: "Today and Tomorrow" (uncredited)
2019–2020	The Walking Dead	Beta	Recurring (Season 9); Main cast (Season 10); 14 episodes
2020–2022	S.W.A.T.	Terry Luca	4 episodes
2021	Paradise City	Oliver Ostergaard	TV spinoff of American Satan
2021–2022	The Mysterious Benedict Society	Milligan	Main role
2025	The Abandons	Miles Elderton	Recurring role

=== Video games ===
Year	Title	Role
2022	God of War Ragnarök	Thor

== Awards and nominations ==
Year	Association	Category	Nominated work	Result
2011	Satellite Awards	Best Supporting Actor – Series, Miniseries or Television Film	Sons of Anarchy	Won
2023	British Academy Games Awards	Performer in a Supporting Role	God of War Ragnarök	Nominated
