= Lauren Ridloff =

American actress (born 1978)

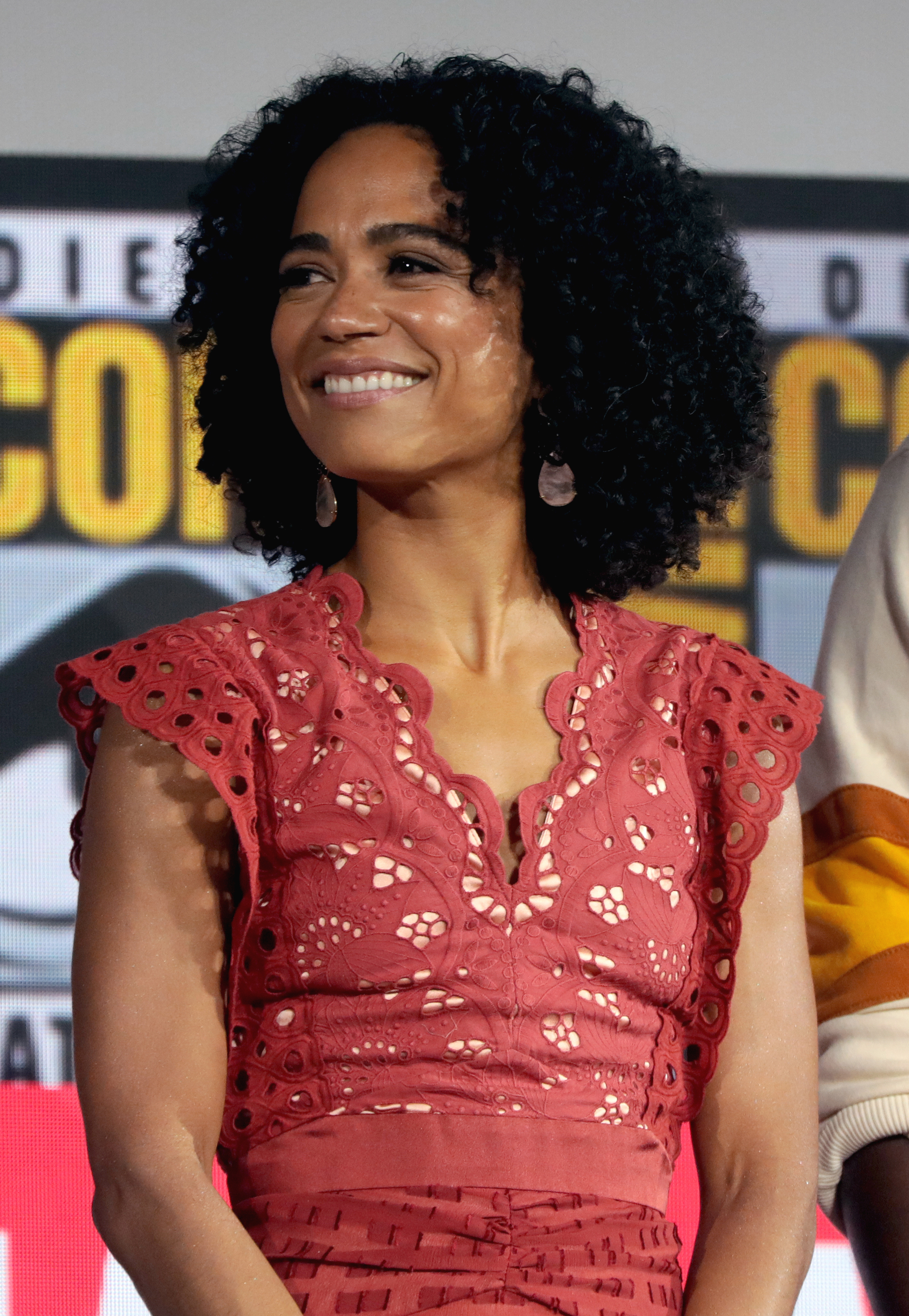
- Ridloff at the 2019 San Diego Comic-Con
- Born: Lauren Teruel; April 6, 1978 (age 48); Chicago, Illinois, U.S.
- Education: California State University, Northridge (BA, 2001); Hunter College (MEd, 2005)
- Occupation: Actress
- Years active: 2017–present
- Spouse: Douglas Ridloff (m. 2006)
- Children: 2

Lauren Ridloff (née Teruel; born April 6, 1978) is a deaf American actress known for her roles in the TV series The Walking Dead and the film Eternals. She gained prominence in 2018 with a lead role in the Broadway revival of Children of a Lesser God, earning her a Tony Award nomination for Best Actress in a Play. Ridloff was born in Chicago, Illinois. She attended California State University, Northridge and later earned a master's degree in education from Hunter College. She initially worked as a teacher before pursuing acting, and she was also crowned Miss Deaf America.

Ridloff's acting career gained momentum when she was hired as an American Sign Language tutor for Kenny Leon, the director of Children of a Lesser God, and subsequently cast in the lead role. She then joined the ninth season of The Walking Dead, and she was also cast as the first deaf superhero in the Marvel Cinematic Universe in the film Eternals. In addition to acting, Ridloff has received various accolades and is actively involved in projects that expand representation in the entertainment industry.

== Early life and education ==
Lauren Teruel was born on April 6, 1978, in Chicago, Illinois, in the United States. She was born deaf to hearing parents, a Mexican-American father and an African-American mother. Her father Hugo was a counselor at University of Illinois at Chicago. He was also a musician, and Ridloff's mother was an artist. Ridloff grew up in the Chicago neighborhood of Hyde Park. Her parents thought their infant had a developmental delay, but by the time she was two years old, they learned that she was deaf. They learned sign language with her and enrolled her in Catholic school with hearing children. She performed well in school. When she was 13 years old, she stopped using her voice so people would stop judging her intelligence based on her vocal intelligibility. Following Catholic school, she attended the Model Secondary School for the Deaf in Washington, D.C., where she was among deaf and hard-of-hearing peers. She began exploring the arts, starting with ceramics and becoming involved with drama. In a school production of The Wiz, she played Dorothy. She was also on the cheerleading team and became one of the first deaf American cheerleaders to compete internationally.

Ridloff chose to attend California State University, Northridge, a university with a large deaf and hard-of-hearing student population, because of its National Center on Deafness. She majored in English with an emphasis in creative writing, completing her degree in 2001. While in college, she joined a local deaf performing group and took up hip-hop dancing. After she graduated in May 2000, she began working at the NCOD, where she was involved in a program to improve post-secondary school education for deaf and hard-of-hearing students. Later in the year, she decided to compete in the National Association of the Deaf's Miss Deaf America competition, having been inspired by the competition she saw two years prior. She won the preliminary competition of Miss Deaf Illinois and ultimately won Miss Deaf America. She was the second consecutive CSUN graduate to win the crown, and she was also the first competitor of either African-American or Mexican-American descent to win the pageant. Her activities in competition included an ASL performance of the book The Giving Tree by Shel Silverstein. After winning Miss Deaf America, she began a two-year stint of attending luncheons and graduation ceremonies as a spokesperson for NAD.

After graduating from CSUN, Ridloff went to Hunter College in New York to study education with the goal of becoming a children's author. After earning her master's degree in education in 2005, She started teaching kindergarten and first grade at Public School 347 in Manhattan. She was also involved with deaf community theater and film work for friends. She married Douglas Ridloff, whom she met at CSUN, in 2006, and they have two children, both boys and both deaf. After nine years of teaching, she left her teaching job to take care of the boys. The family lived in Williamsburg, Brooklyn, a neighborhood of New York, until they moved to Austin, Texas, in 2022.

== Acting career ==
=== Lead-up to Children of a Lesser God ===
Ridloff played a small role as a superpowered agent in the 2017 film Sign Gene: The First Deaf Superheroes. She also joined the production of the 2017 film Wonderstruck as a consultant and was ultimately cast in a small role. She also appeared in the lyric video for the song "Love Me Now" by John Legend.

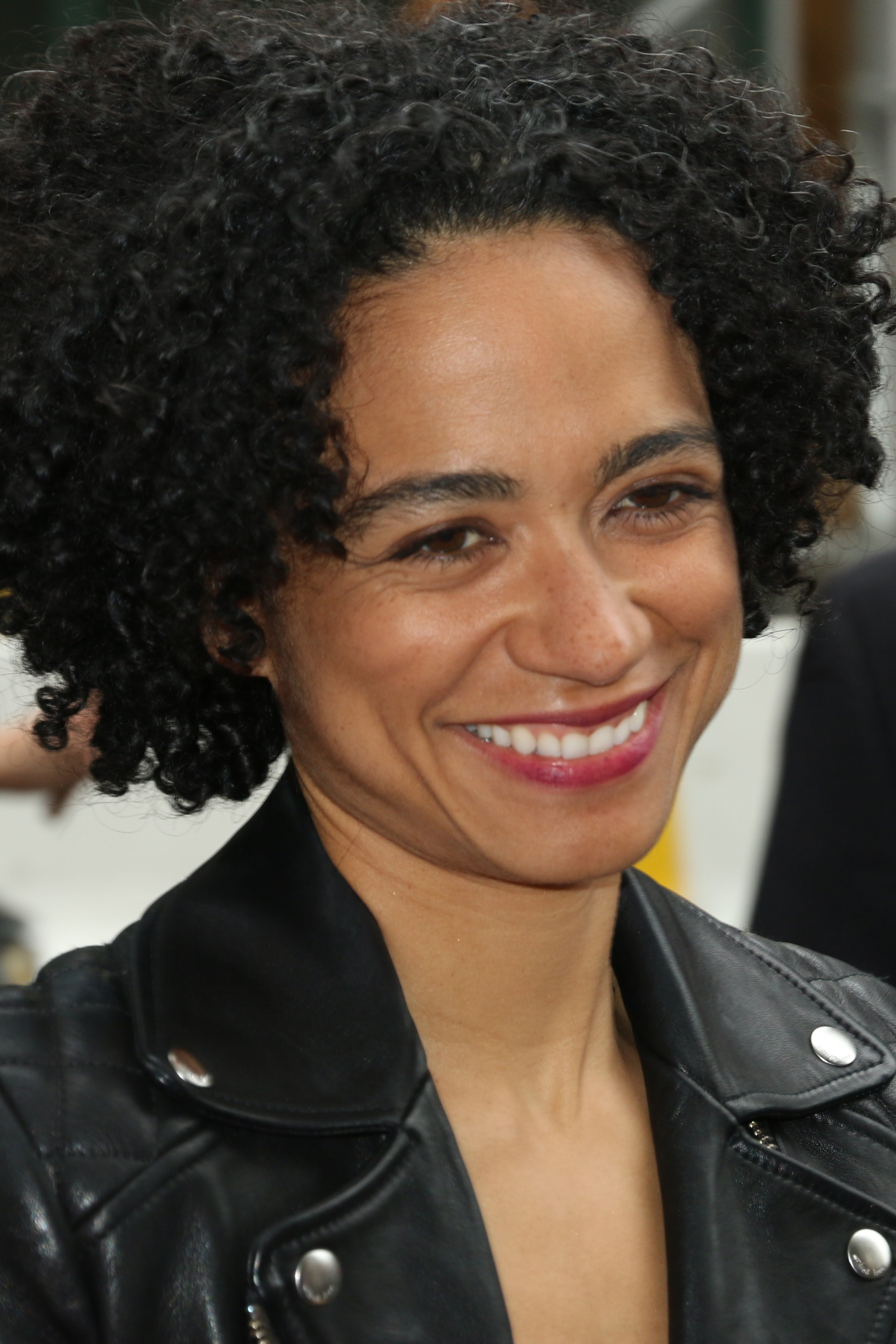
Ridloff after the conclusion of Children of a Lesser God in May 2018

When director Kenny Leon began producing a revival of the 1980 play Children of a Lesser God, he hired Ridloff to tutor him in American Sign Language. Leon cast Joshua Jackson as the male lead but had not cast the female lead role. By then, Ridloff had been tutoring Leon for over a year. He asked her to substitute at a read-through early on, and based on her performance, he offered her the role as Sarah Norman. The cast had an initial run at the Berkshire Theatre Group in Stockbridge, Massachusetts. One of the most challenging aspects of her role was using her voice, which she had not used since she was 13 years old. The New York Times wrote, "Ms. Ridloff compares the experience of using her voice during the play to a crotch shot, saying that at first she felt exposed, and vulnerable, and ugly." After a year with the role and with a vocal coach, she found greater ease. She explained, "It feels empowering to me—like finally I own every part of myself, [but] I don't see myself ever using my voice on a conversational level—that's just not who I am." The revival premiered on Broadway in April 2018, and The New York Times wrote, "Critics were underwhelmed by the production, but mesmerized by Ms. Ridloff." The revival was shuttered on May 27, 2018.

=== The Walking Dead, Eternals, and beyond ===
Ridloff was a fan of the TV series The Walking Dead, which had premiered in 2010, and submitted an audition tape to be cast in the series. She was cast as Connie and started her role in the show's ninth season, which premiered in October 2018. In July 2019, Ridloff was cast in the 2021 Marvel Cinematic Universe superhero film Eternals as the superhero Makkari, who in the comics is a hearing and white man. As part of director Chloé Zhao's approach to broaden casting representation, the casting of Ridloff revises the character to be a deaf woman of color. The casting makes Ridloff the first deaf superhero in the MCU. To film for Eternals, Ridloff took a leave of absence from The Walking Dead, not appearing in six consecutive episodes of the show's tenth season. Her role in Eternals led to an increase in web searches for American Sign Language courses.

Following Ridloff's appearance in Eternals in 2021, she re-partnered with Joshua Jackson from Children of a Lesser God to star together in a romantic drama TV series being developed by Ava DuVernay at the TV network Starz. The network gave a three-season commitment to the planned series in May 2022. Ridloff was also attached as executive producer along with DuVernay and Jackson. In September 2023, Starz said that the drama series, which had started filming, would not be proceeding, following DuVernay's decision to depart after her contract with Warner Bros. TV concluded and amidst several series changes at the network.

In July 2022, Ridloff was one of three deaf actors cast in an episode of the Fox anthology drama TV series Accused, with the episode being directed by Marlee Matlin, and the episode aired in January 2023.

Ridloff joined the ensemble cast for the untitled Ocean's Eleven prequel film, directed by Bradley Cooper and to be released in June 2027.

== Recognition and advocacy ==
In 2020, Ridloff received the SAG-AFTRA Harold Russell Award at the 41st Media Access Awards. In the same year, the British Academy of Film and Television Arts selected Ridloff as a 2020 Breakthrough performer along with 33 other talents in film, television, and games.

In March 2023, the New York Women in Film & Television at their Muse Awards honored Ridloff along with several women in the industry. In December, Ridloff delivered a lecture about inclusion and representation as part of the Kean University President’s Distinguished Lecture Series.

== Credits ==
Ridloff's acting credits
Year(s)	Title	Medium	Role	Notes	Ref.
2017	Sign Gene: The First Deaf Superheroes	Feature film	QIA agent		
2017	Wonderstruck	Feature film	Pearl, The Maid		
2018	Children of a Lesser God	Stage	Sarah Norman		
2018–2022	The Walking Dead	Television	Connie	Seasons 9 through 11 (30 episodes)	
2018	Legacies	Television	Dragon	Episode: "Some People Just Want to Watch the World Burn"	
2019	New Amsterdam	Television	Margot	Episode: "Happy Place"	
2019	Sound of Metal	Feature film	Diane		
2021	Eternals	Feature film	Makkari		
2021	The Magnificent Meyersons	Feature film	Tammy		
2023	Accused	Television	Sari	Episode: "Ava's Story"	
2027	Untitled Ocean's Eleven prequel	Feature film		Filming	

== Accolades ==
Ridloff's acting awards
Year	Title	Medium	Award	Ceremony	Result	Ref.
2018	Children of a Lesser God	Stage	Drama League Award for Distinguished Performance	84th Drama League Awards	Nominated	
2018	Children of a Lesser God	Stage	Outer Critics Circle Award for Outstanding Actress in a Play	Outer Critics Circle Awards for 2017–2018	Nominated	
2018	Children of a Lesser God	Stage	Theatre World Award	Theatre World Awards for 2017-2018	Honored	
2018	Children of a Lesser God	Stage	Tony Award for Best Actress in a Play	72nd Tony Awards	Nominated	

== See also ==
- List of Afro-Latinos
