= Morning Star (The Walking Dead) =

- The Walking Dead episode
- Episode no.: Season 10; Episode 11
- Directed by: Michael E. Satrazemis
- Written by: Vivian Tse; Julia Ruchman
- Cinematography by: Jalaludin Trautmann
- Editing by: Jack Colwell
- Original air date: March 8, 2020
- Running time: 45 minutes

Guest appearances
- Dan Fogler as Luke; Thora Birch as Gamma / Mary; John Finn as Earl Sutton; Angel Theory as Kelly; Kerry Cahill as Dianne; Nadine Marissa as Nabila; Margot Bingham as Stephanie (voice only); Karen Ceesay as Bertie; Anthony Lopez as Oscar; Anabelle Holloway as Gracie; Antony Azor as R.J. Grimes; Gustavo Gomez as Marco

Episode chronology
← Previous "Stalker"	Next → "Walk with Us"
- The Walking Dead season 10

"Morning Star" is the eleventh episode of the tenth season of the post-apocalyptic horror television series The Walking Dead, which aired on AMC on March 8, 2020. The episode was written by Vivian Tse and Julia Ruchman, and directed by Michael E. Satrazemis.

After Daryl (Norman Reedus) and Lydia's (Cassady McClincy) encounter with Alpha (Samantha Morton), the communities must decide whether to run or fight the Whisperers, who are coming for Hilltop. Meanwhile, Eugene's (Josh McDermitt) communication with Stephanie (Margot Bingham) gets complicated. The episode received positive reviews from critics.

== Plot ==
Eugene continues his conversations with Stephanie over the radio. He discovers that she also saw the falling satellite and determines she must be relatively nearby. Eugene offers to allow her to select a time and place for them to meet, and she says she will discuss it with the others. Meanwhile at the Hilltop, Aaron arrives with Mary, explaining that she wishes to see her nephew, Adam, now under the care of Earl. Earl does not allow her to see Adam, remembering how her people abandoned him.

Ezekiel, having been told by Jerry and Kelly about the events at the mine, tracks down Carol at Daryl's former camp in the woods, and convinces her to return to the Hilltop. Daryl and Lydia also return shortly after, warning that Alpha and her horde are coming. Rosita comes in search of Eugene and discovers the unattended radio with Stephanie trying to reach Eugene. Rosita asks her who she is, and Stephanie immediately falls quiet. Eugene hurriedly rushes back in and attempts to get Stephanie to answer to no avail, and he sternly tells Rosita to leave as he continues to attempt to reestablish communication.

Before leaving with the horde, Negan attempts to persuade Alpha that it would be better to terrorize the Hilltop and make them bend the knee to her rather than killing them. The residents of the Hilltop attempt to evacuate, but discover Alpha has blocked all roads leading out, with reanimated hanged Hilltop guards dangling from trees along the road. Daryl recognizes this as a Negan scare tactic, concluding that he is now working with Alpha. With no other option, they begin reinforcing the perimeter of the Hilltop.

Carol visits Ezekiel and takes notice of his growing tumor, and the two have sex. Rosita later finds Eugene rigging up defenses and encourages him to not give up on Stephanie, challenging him to kiss her, knowing his long infatuation with her. He finds he is unable to, proving Rosita's point that he really does have feelings for Stephanie, and he resolves to keep trying to contact her. He does so singing for her, when he finishes singing, she returns on the radio and apologizes for breaking contact, and gives him coordinates to meet her in one week.

Daryl and Ezekiel meet before the battle, reconciling their past disputes and promising each other that should one of them fall, the other would be in charge of leading the children out of harm's way. The residents of the Hilltop gather with weapons and shields outside the walls of the community as night falls, and prepare to face the horde. The walker horde is slowed down by electrical traps and a makeshift barricade which allows the survivors to kill walkers from a safe distance.

The Whisperers load up grenades of flammable liquid, and sling them at the barricade, the walls of the Hilltop, and the survivors themselves. They then follow up with flaming arrows, setting alight the barricade. In the woods, Negan questions Alpha, as he expected she would bring the Hilltop survivors into her group, rather than kill them all. Alpha tells Negan that she does intend for the survivors to join with her, but as part of her horde. The flames and the force of the horde are too great, and the survivors are forced to fall back. While attempting to reenter the Hilltop, the outer walls are set ablaze, trapping the survivors between the fire and the horde.

== Production ==
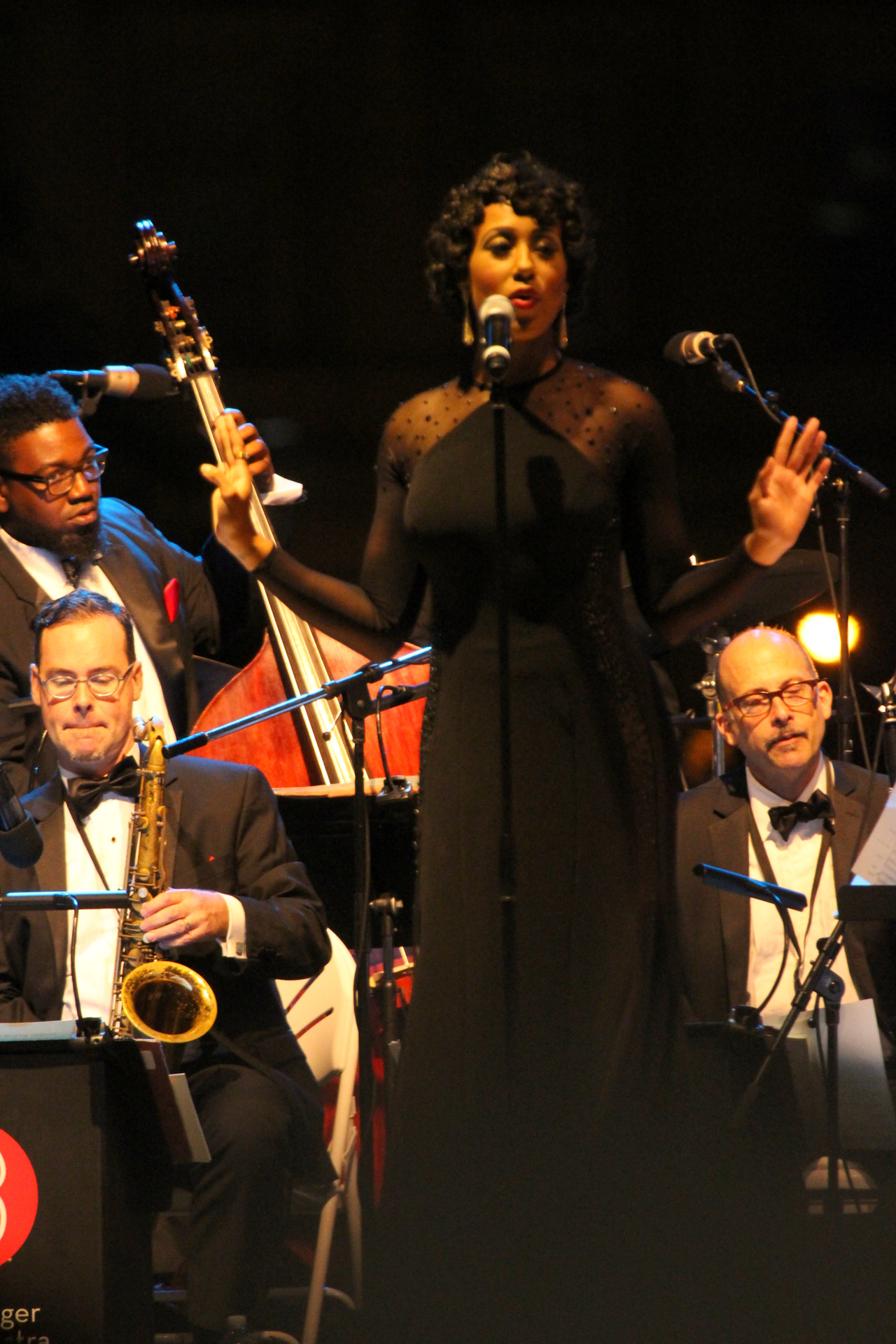
Margot Bingham portrays Stephanie, who reveals her identity in the episode.

This episode reveals the identity of the mysterious woman on the radio whose name is Stephanie, a member of the Commonwealth, portrayed by Margot Bingham. The song Eugene sings on the radio to Stephanie is "When the Wild Wind Blows" by Iron Maiden.

== Reception ==
=== Critical reception ===
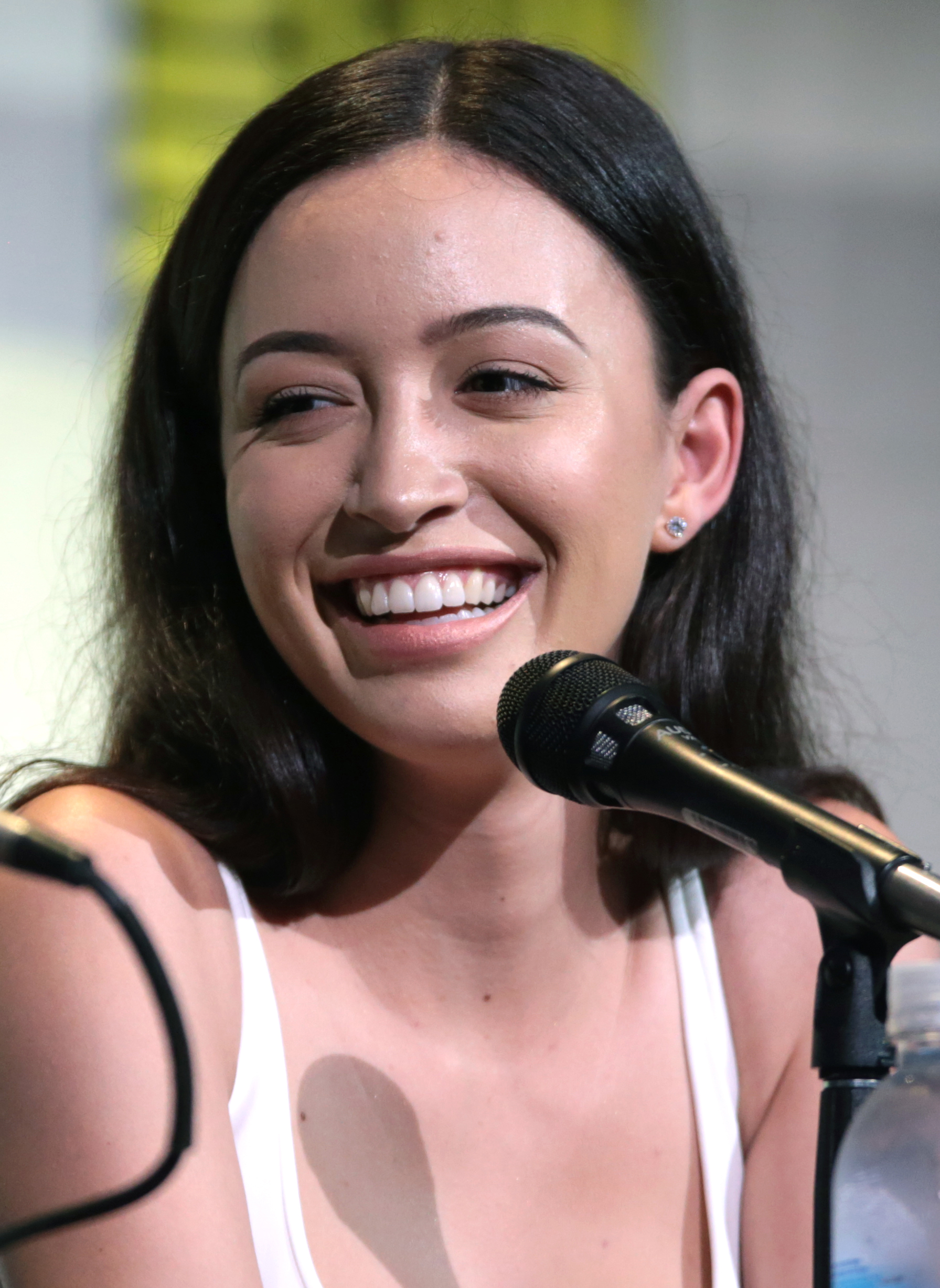
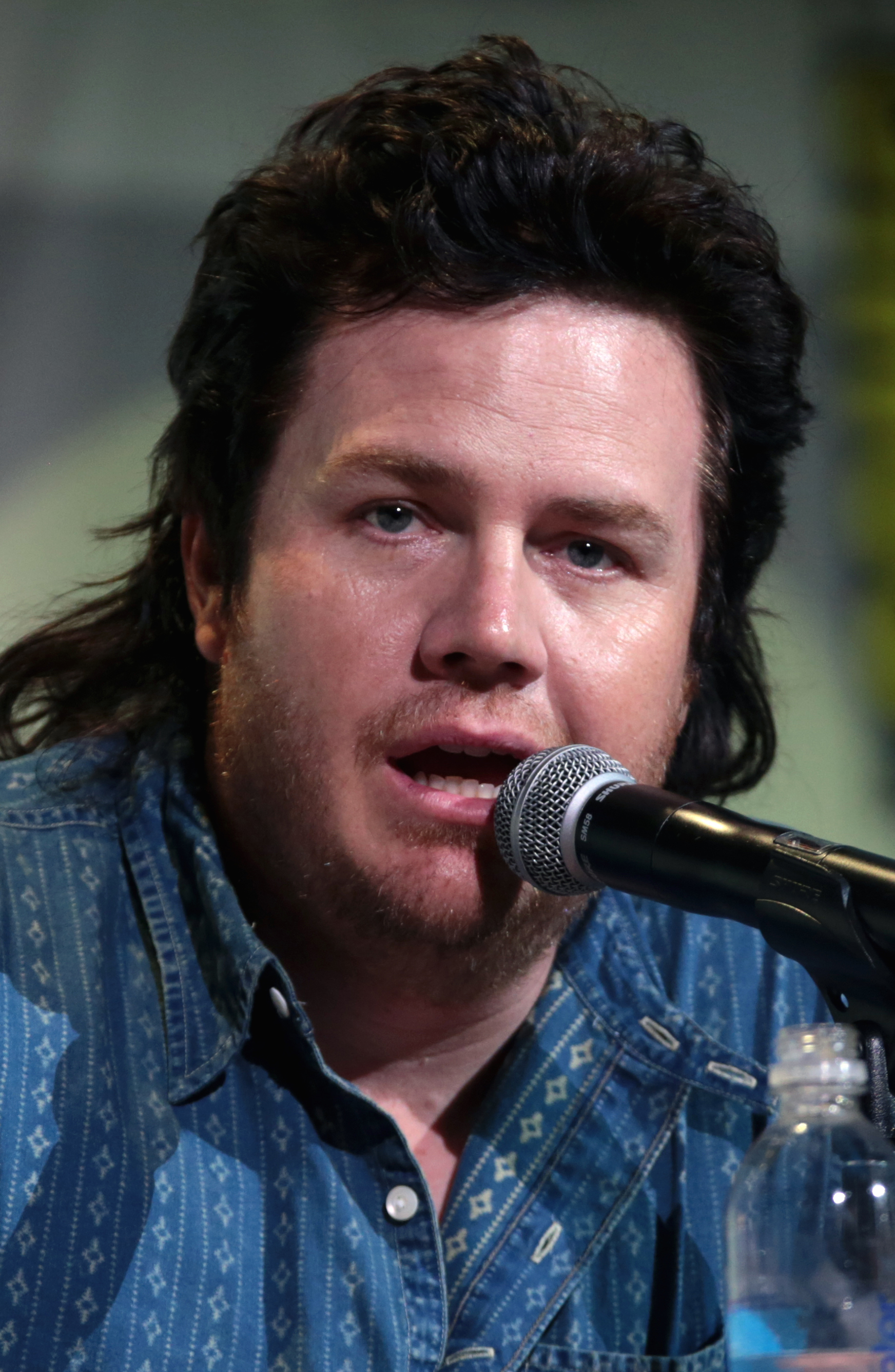
Christian Serratos (Rosita Espinosa) and Josh McDermitt (Eugene Porter) received positive reviews for their scenes together in the episode.

"Morning Star" received very positive reviews. On Rotten Tomatoes, the episode has an approval rating of 94% with an average score of 7.56 out of 10, based on 18 reviews. The site's critical consensus reads: "Before ending with a spectacular cliff-hanger, 'Morning Star' pits the Hilltop crew against the Whisperers in a skillfully staged battle that promises a bloody end to this season."

Dustin Rowles of Uproxx wrote: "It is a tremendously great battle and a great cap to the end of the episode, which otherwise trafficked in some nice character moments, particularly those of Rosita and Eugene." He praised Christian Serratos, writing that she "has been very good this season now that she's finally been given some material with which to work".

Writing for Pajiba, Brian Richards gave it an average review, and wrote in summary: "Not a bad episode, even though it took it sweet-ass time to get the ball rolling and have the war against the Whisperers finally start."

Matt Fowler of IGN gave the episode an 8 out of 10 and wrote: "'Morning Star' told one story, and told it well. It gathered the entire cast into one spot and forced them into battle against staggering odds. It felt big and important enough to be the final 'brawl to settle it all' when it comes to the Whisperer War."

=== Ratings ===
"Morning Star" received 2.93 million viewers, the lowest rating in the show's history to date.
