= Bounty (The Walking Dead) =

- The Walking Dead episode
- Episode no.: Season 9 Episode 11
- Directed by: Meera Menon
- Written by: Matthew Negrete
- Cinematography by: Duane Manwiller
- Editing by: Evan Schrodek
- Original air date: February 24, 2019
- Running time: 42 minutes

Guest appearances
- Eleanor Matsuura as Yumiko; Dan Fogler as Luke; Nadia Hilker as Magna; Cooper Andrews as Jerry; Brett Butler as Tammy Rose Sutton; John Finn as Earl; Lauren Ridloff as Connie; Matt Lintz as Henry; Cassady McClincy as Lydia; Kerry Cahill as Dianne; Angel Theory as Kelly

Episode chronology
| ← Previous "Omega" | Next → "Guardians" |
- The Walking Dead season 9

"Bounty" is the eleventh episode of the ninth season of the post-apocalyptic horror television series The Walking Dead, which aired on AMC on February 24, 2019.

This episode marks the final appearance of Paul "Jesus" Rovia (Tom Payne), who died in the mid-season finale episode "Evolution".

== Plot ==
In a flashback, Carol, Ezekiel, and Jerry wait for representatives from the Hilltop and Alexandria to arrive to trade goods in a clearing in the woods. Jerry reveals that he and his wife Nabila are expecting a child. Eventually, Jesus and Tara arrive with the trade goods, and Jesus hands Ezekiel the charter of rights that Michonne had been developing for the Kingdom to hold onto; Ezekiel becomes enamored by the document and promises Carol that someday the community leaders will all sign it together. In the present, Ezekiel looks longingly at the charter in the Kingdom.

At the Hilltop, Alpha demands that the community residents turn over her daughter Lydia. She explains that she has removed her walker mask to show them that she comes in peace and willing to overlook their trespass of her lands. Daryl is initially dismissive of her demands as she and her human allies are few compared to the Hilltop forces. However, there are several more of Alpha's allies in wait beyond the tree lines, as well as a horde of walkers. He decides to walk outside to talk to Alpha face to face. Daryl tells her that she can't have Lydia and informs her that he's ready to fight her people to ensure she doesn't get Lydia back, until he spots one of the Whisperers with a baby. Suddenly, a couple of Whisperers bring up a tied up Alden and Luke. Alpha then offers to trade both of them for her daughter; Daryl accepts.

At the Kingdom, with the fair approaching, Ezekiel leads a scouting party to a nearby town. His goal is to obtain a projection bulb from a movie theater to replace the one that is broken, but the theater is packed with walkers. Carol is initially against the plan, but is convinced by Ezekiel, who explains how this will be a positive improvement for the Kingdom. With minimal incident, they recover the bulb as well as one of the poster display cases, which Ezekiel wants to use so that he can frame the charter of rights once it is signed.

Inside the Hilltop, Daryl discovers that Henry and Lydia escaped. Addy tells him that she knows where they went; she and Enid head out to find them. As the standoff continues, the baby belonging to one of disguised women starts to cry, drawing the walkers. Alpha shrugs at the mother, indicating that she should leave the baby to die. Fearing for her life, the baby's mother decides to abandon him as he continues to cry. Alden and Luke beg for Alpha to have the baby be spared, but Alpha refuses. The Hilltop guards bang the fence to attract the walkers away from the baby, but it doesn't work. Luke then signs Connie, still hiding in the cornfield, to grab the baby. Connie then runs out of the cornfield and rushes to save the child. The Whisperers around her unsheathe blades as Connie escapes back into the cornfield and is helped back into the Hilltop by Daryl, Kelly, Tammy, and Earl.

Soon after, Enid and Addy are able to track down Henry and Lydia to an abandoned house near the Hilltop, where Henry has provided Lydia a new set of clothes. Enid tries to convince Henry not to let the bad things change him, and she urges him to allow them to turn over Lydia, recalling how much death she herself has seen and the advice Carl had given her before he died. Lydia opts to leave on her own accord and is traded for Alden and Luke. Reunited, Lydia apologizes to her mother, but is slapped by Alpha across the face, ordering her to address her as "Alpha" like everyone else. She then smiles at Daryl as they leave.

The child recovered by Connie is turned over to Earl and Tammy to raise. That night, Henry leaves a note and sneaks out of the Hilltop to find Lydia. His departure is soon discovered by Daryl, who finds out that Henry couldn't live with letting Lydia go. Daryl then decides to chase him down, but is stopped by Connie. She insists that he let her join him as she feels the same way as Henry; they both depart together.

== Production ==
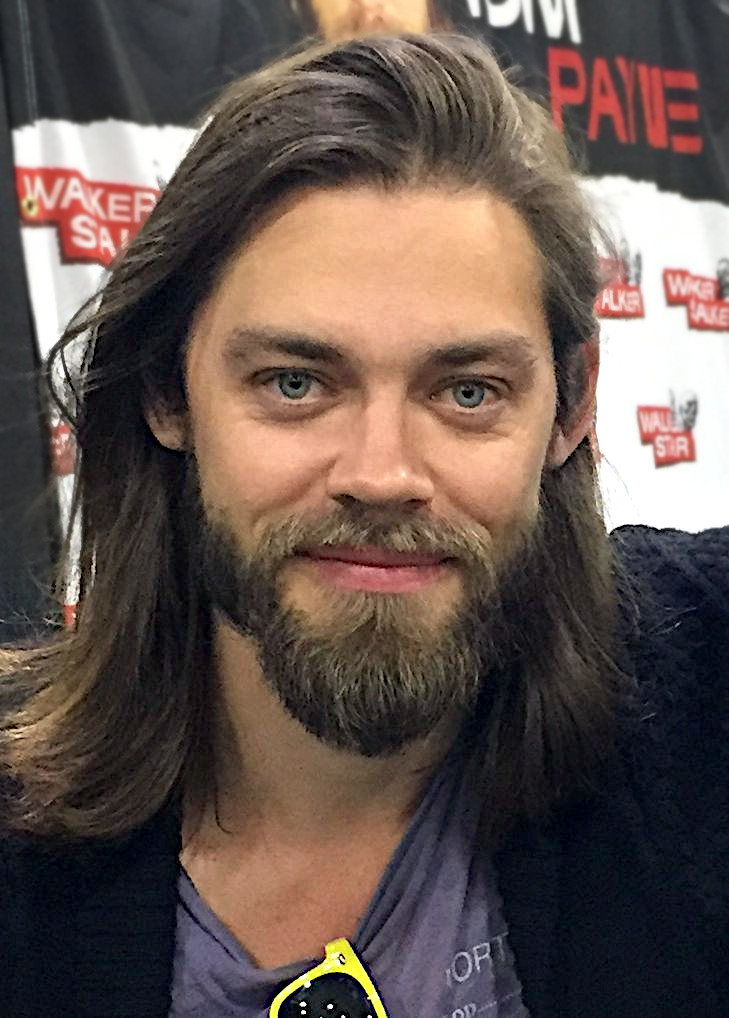
Tom Payne appears for the last time in this episode in a flashback sequence.

This episode features a cameo of Tom Payne as Paul "Jesus" Rovia, who appears in a flashback; his character was killed in the mid-season finale episode "Evolution".

== Reception ==
=== Critical reception ===
"Bounty" received positive reviews from critics. On Rotten Tomatoes, the episode has an approval rating of 79% with an average score of 7.10 out of 10, based on 19 reviews. The critical consensus reads: "'Bounty' rekindles The Walking Dead's knack for a lighthearted shaggy dog story and hair-raising horror set-piece, but some viewers may come away dissatisfied with the installment's teasing of a clash that never materializes."

=== Ratings ===
"Bounty" received a total viewership of 4.39 million with a 1.7 rating in adults aged 18–49. It was the highest-rated cable program of the night, however, it marked a series low in both viewership and its 18-49 rating.
