= Walk with Us =

- The Walking Dead episode
- Episode no.: Season 10; Episode 12
- Directed by: Greg Nicotero
- Written by: Nicole Mirante-Matthews; Eli Jorne
- Cinematography by: Duane Charles Manwiller
- Editing by: Alan Cody
- Original air date: March 15, 2020
- Running time: 45 minutes

Guest appearances
- Dan Fogler as Luke; Thora Birch as Gamma / Mary; John Finn as Earl Sutton; Angel Theory as Kelly; Kerry Cahill as Dianne; Nadine Marissa as Nabila; Anabelle Holloway as Gracie; Antony Azor as R.J. Grimes

Episode chronology
← Previous "Morning Star"	Next → "What We Become"
- The Walking Dead season 10

"Walk with Us" is the twelfth episode of the tenth season of the post-apocalyptic horror television series The Walking Dead, which aired on AMC on March 15, 2020. The episode was written by Nicole Mirante-Matthews and Eli Jorne, and directed by Greg Nicotero.

Following the attack on the Hilltop, led by Alpha (Samantha Morton), alongside Negan (Jeffrey Dean Morgan), the Whisperers lead a massive horde of walkers into the settlement while the survivors are forced to fall back.

== Plot ==
As the battle between the Hilltop and the Whisperers rages, the sheer volume of walkers slowly begins overwhelming the survivors, compounded by the Whisperers setting much of the community ablaze. The survivors begin to retreat when the Whisperers destroy one of the Hilltop's walls. Judith kills a Whisperer she believed to be a walker, shaking her as this is the first human life she has taken; she and the other children are ushered away by Earl. Eugene recovers the radio he was using to contact Stephanie from Barrington House, while Yumiko is shocked to see Magna camouflaged amongst the horde.

The next morning, Alpha tells Negan that she will not consider the battle a victory until she has regained Lydia. Negan subsequently stumbles upon Aaron, who reacts in anger to Negan switching sides, but retreats when walkers start to close in. Negan then proceeds to find Lydia in the woods and captures her, tying her up in a cabin, while the other survivors migrate toward planned rendezvous points. When Mary, Alden, Kelly, and Adam are confronted by walkers, Mary lures them away only to be killed by Beta, ripping off part of Beta's mask before she dies; Beta then kills a Whisperer who recognizes him from before the apocalypse. Elsewhere, Magna tells Yumiko that she and Connie were separated while the herd was being moved out of the cavern, and the pair decide to end their relationship on mutual terms after Yumiko punches Carol for causing Magna and Connie's predicament.

Meanwhile, Earl hides the children in a cottage as he prepares to kill himself, having been bitten during the battle. However, his suicide attempt fails to destroy his brain, forcing Judith to put down his reanimated body afterward. A group of survivors later arrive to retrieve the children after finding Ezekiel; Daryl comforts the despondent Judith.

In the woods, Negan reports to Alpha that he has found Lydia. He tries to talk her out of killing her own daughter, relating the story of how his late wife Lucille died from cancer. However, Alpha insists she believes this is the only thing she can do for her daughter for failing to become a Whisperer. As Lydia struggles free of her restraints, Negan leads Alpha to a nearby cabin, but it is soon revealed that Lydia is not in it. A confused Alpha turns to Negan, who then slits her throat while her guard is down, killing her. Negan then delivers Alpha's severed, reanimated head to Carol, who is pleased.

== Production ==
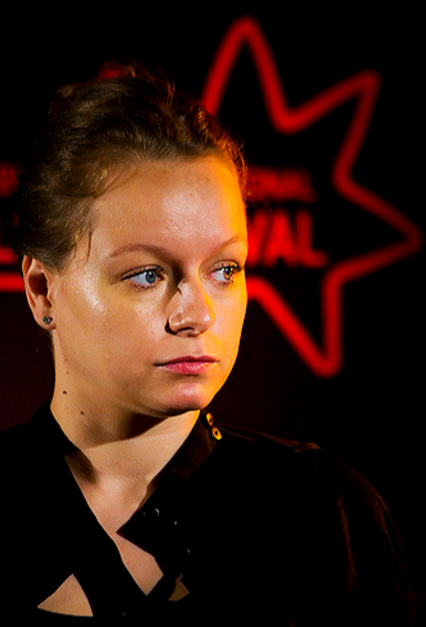
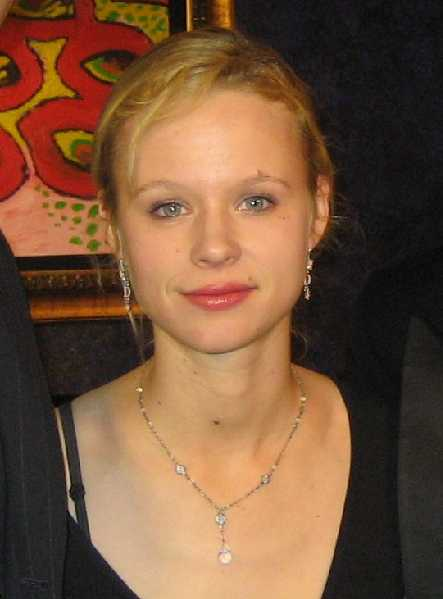
"Walk with Us" marks the deaths of Alpha, portrayed by Samantha Morton (left), and Gamma / Mary, portrayed by Thora Birch (right). Morton's performance has been critically acclaimed.

"Walk with Us" features the death of Alpha (Samantha Morton) at the hands of Negan (Jeffrey Dean Morgan) which resembles her death from an issue adapted from the comic book series. It also features the final appearances of Gamma / Mary (Thora Birch) and Earl Sutton (John Finn), who are both killed in this episode.

During an interview with Dalton Ross for Entertainment Weekly, Morton said the following about her character's death:

I knew when I got the part — basically, when [showrunner] Angela [Kang] and I were talking about Alpha and the possibility of me playing her and all that kind of stuff. She was really, really honest and said, "Listen, this is what's going to happen." I think that the overwhelming feeling on the show is that you are part of the story that continues. The show is bigger than any one individual, it is all about The Walking Dead, so to play a villain such as Alpha, you know that something's got to give. So, I always knew.

In an interview with Kirsten Acuna for Insider, Morton also revealed the following about Alpha's death:

Well, I kind of always knew because when I was in discussions with [showrunner] Angela [Kang] under the early stages if I potentially was going to play Alpha, it was very clear that this character would have her head chopped off. So it kind of ... I always knew. Yeah, I just knew.

In an interview with Josh Wigler for The Hollywood Reporter, showrunner Angela Kang clarified the following about Alpha's fate:

We often remix moments from the comics, but I came into the room to break the season feeling very steadfast that we needed to do the Negan [kills] Alpha storyline. It's such an iconic storyline. But we needed to have our own twist on it, which is why we have Carol. The emotional aspect of that story is so strong, the idea that they were in it together in this very particular way, but Negan takes his own path toward getting there. But yeah, we were always going to do Negan [killing] Alpha.

During an interview for Entertainment Weekly, Kang explained the following about Alpha's death:

So first of all this pairing in the comic of Alpha and Negan, it's one of my favorites parts of the comic and we knew that we wanted to do this story of Negan as the one that ultimately kills Alpha. And so how do we do that in the show where it still has that surprising element that we had in the books? How can we service all the emotional elements that are there, and Carol's part in it. We really liked the idea of doing this partway through the back half [of the season], not in the finale. It felt like Alpha for her side had this kind of epic emotional story with her daughter. And so we wanted to get to a place with the story where we understood that Alpha was ready to kill her own daughter. And that seemed to make sense. It tracked via the rejecting her once and for all.

And then from Negan's side, we asked ourselves: What is Negan's red line? And we know that Negan really genuinely seems to care about children. In the books, he was a teacher before the apocalypse began, and we showed him develop this relationship to Lydia. And just the fact that Alpha has this go in and kill everybody, who cares, burn it all down, I'll kill my own child philosophy — that really feels like for Negan that's the red line that he can't cross. There's a lot about Alpha that I think would be appealing to him. He obviously is really drawn to the strong, but we felt that to get the most satisfying version of that, that it had to be complicated for Negan too.

And so that's how we worked about just constructing all of that. And then we really wanted to demonstrate that conflict in real time. And so it felt like if she's there ready to kill her daughter, it's almost like a test for him, and she fails, and so he has to do it in that moment.

== Reception ==
=== Critical reception ===
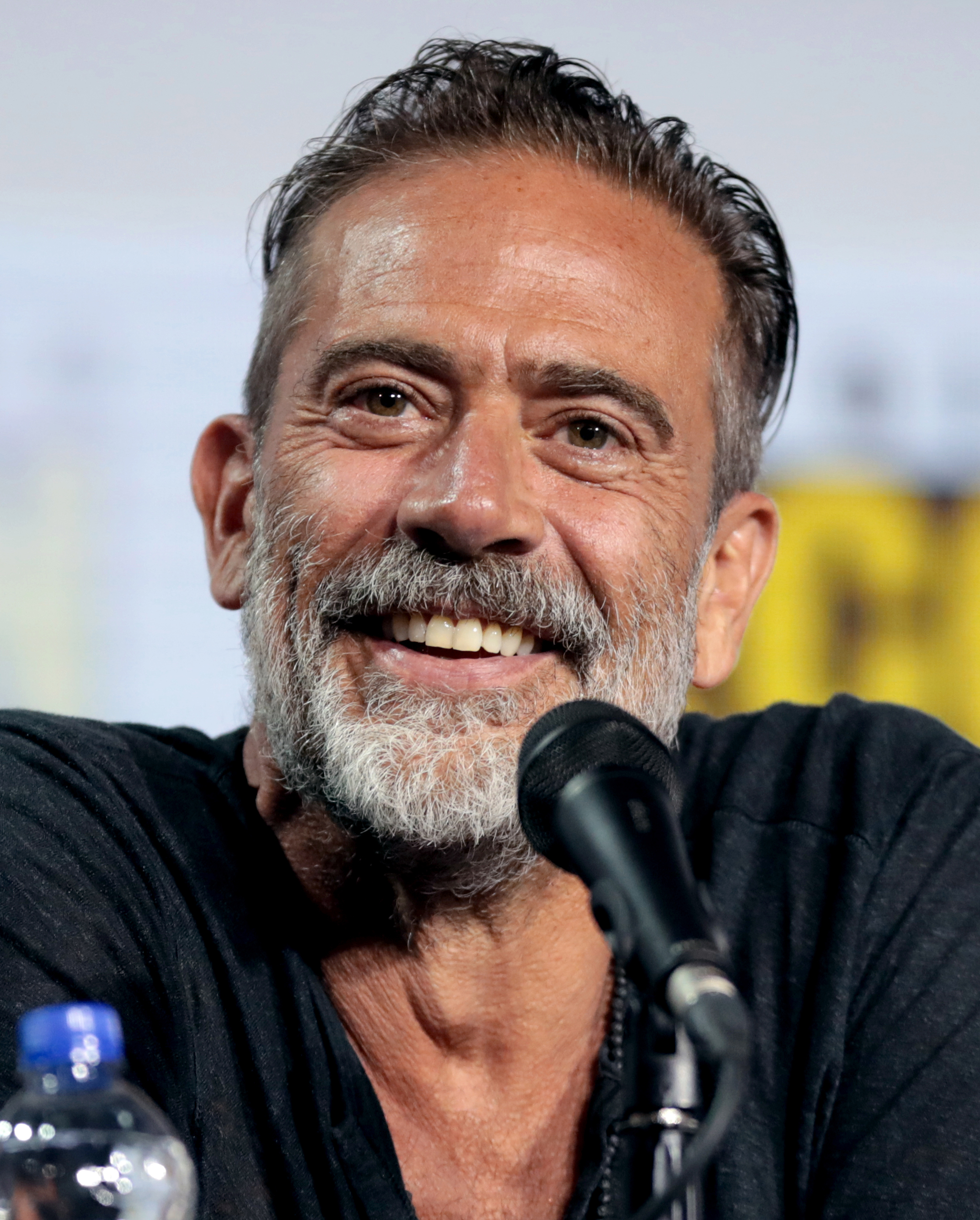
The character development of Negan (Jeffrey Dean Morgan) was acclaimed by critics in this episode.

"Walk with Us" received critical acclaim. On Rotten Tomatoes, the episode has an approval rating of 94% with an average score of 8.10 out of 10, based on 18 reviews. The site's critical consensus reads: "Following a swift and violent conclusion to last week's harrowing battle, 'Walk With Us' delivers a restless aftermath marked by stunning characters deaths and unanticipated twists."

Noetta Harjo of Geek Girl Authority praised the episode, writing: "This season is just getting better. I was on the edge of my seat throughout this episode of The Walking Dead. RIP Mary a.k.a. Gamma and Earl. RIP Alpha?" Writing for The A.V. Club, Alex McLevy gave the episode a C+ and wrote: "It started great and ended even better; if only there weren't that whole episode in between to drag it down." Conversely, Jeff Stone of IndieWire gave the episode an A−, writing: "There are a few too many holes for the episode to be a complete success, but it's another very strong showing in a half-season that's had way more good than bad."

Forbes' Erik Kain noted the following: "The second part of the Hilltop battle was almost as great as the first part. It's pretty cool to see The Walking Dead go this big with a battle scene and really pull it off." Writing for Den of Geek, Ron Hogan gave the episode 4 out of 5 stars and wrote: "Solid performances abound, with [Jeffrey Dean] Morgan and Samantha Morton continuing to be spectacular." Matt Fowler of IGN gave the episode an 8 out of 10, writing: "It was paced and plotted out in a bizarre way that left us asking questions... Some mid-card character deaths, and a big final twist that took down the major villain, helped elevate it in the end." Writing for Pajiba, Brian Richards praised the episode and wrote: "A very impressive episode that helped bring an end to Samantha Morton's time as Alpha, who was one of the very best things about the show these last couple of seasons."

=== Ratings ===
"Walk with Us" received 3.49 million viewers, up from the previous episode's rating.
