= Omega (The Walking Dead) =

- The Walking Dead episode
- Episode no.: Season 9 Episode 10
- Directed by: David Boyd
- Written by: Channing Powell
- Cinematography by: Stephen Campbell
- Editing by: Alan Cody
- Original air date: February 17, 2019
- Running time: 46 minutes

Guest appearances
- Eleanor Matsuura as Yumiko; Nadia Hilker as Magna; Steve Kazee as Frank; Lauren Ridloff as Connie; Matt Lintz as Henry; Cassady McClincy as Lydia; Angel Theory as Kelly; James Chen as Kal

Episode chronology
← Previous "Adaptation"	Next → "Bounty"
- The Walking Dead season 9

"Omega" is the tenth episode of the ninth season of the post-apocalyptic horror television series The Walking Dead, which aired on AMC on February 17, 2019.

== Plot ==
At the Hilltop, Lydia describes her backstory to Henry while both are in the community prison, unaware Daryl is listening in. As Lydia explains, Henry starts to become more compassionate toward Lydia, his own family having gone through similar hardships. Throughout the episode, Lydia's stories are told in flashbacks. She and her parents have taken refuge in a Baltimore shelter with others. Lydia's father's sanity starts to unravel and he believes the shelter is no longer safe.

Meanwhile in the present, Tara leads Magna, Yumiko, Connie, and Kelly to search for Alden and Luke, aware that they may encounter more people like Lydia that wear walker disguises. While they find the pair's horses, Tara declares it is too risky to stay out and orders the group back to the Hilltop. There, Magna's group debates going against orders to go back out and search for Luke, knowing that this will harm their chance to be accepted by the Hilltop.

At the Hilltop, Daryl drags Henry away, fearing he may be becoming too close. Daryl continues to talk to her as well, trying to scope out the size of her group as Lydia claims that they may be coming to save her. She reveals that her mother grew increasingly hardened as the apocalypse continued, willing to kill a survivor sheltering with them who is having a panic attack as she considers him too weak to survive. As he hears the story, Daryl finds Lydia's arm covered in marks, which she says came from her mom. Daryl, who had been similarly beaten as a child, displays sympathy for Lydia's abuse. She finishes her story by telling of how the survivor her mother killed turned one night, and ended up biting her father, who was trying to save his daughter. This only serves to harden Lydia's mother, eventually leading them to don the masks made from walkers to survive. As Lydia still believes in her mother's methods, Daryl eventually walks off. Daryl tells Henry that Lydia is Tara's problem, but Henry tries to convince him that she is coming to face her past now. Henry mentions his adoptive mother, Carol, who had cut her hair short due to abuse from her first husband, Ed, has finally grown to feel safe enough to let it grow again now. Daryl agrees to work with Henry to try to help Lydia.

That night, Magna's group try to find the tracks again, they start to hear walkers. Magna then suggests that they need to return, but Kelly states that they should find Luke, who she has an emotional attachment to; Connie opts to stay with Kelly. Unbeknownst to them, a Whisperer secretly watches them. Eventually, Magna and Yumiko return to the Hilltop by daylight.

Before dawn, Henry decides to let Lydia out of her cell for a while and discreetly shows her the safety and facilities the Hilltop has to offer. While Lydia has an opportunity to take a hammer and strike Henry with it to escape, the cries of a baby cause her to panic and flashback to her past, and she begs to be returned to her cell. She asks Henry to stay with her through the night. When morning comes, Daryl returns and Lydia states that she doesn't think her mother will be coming, and she was only trying to scope out information for her. Lydia then tells them that her story was a lie, her mother having told her that story to blame her father's death on Lydia. In reality, when the survivor had turned, it wasn't Lydia's father that was bitten, but instead another survivor; her mother took the opportunity to try to make their escape from the shelter, killing Lydia's father when he refused to leave with them. Lydia mentions where her mother and her people may be camped, but notes that they frequently move about.

On a guard post, Yumiko apologizes to Tara for leaving. Tara accepts and tells Yumiko to talk to her next time, and informs her that the guards had seen them leave and that she had sent out a party to find and recover them, not wanting to see anyone else hurt. As they watch the guards bring Kelly and Connie back just outside the Hilltop gate, they spot a small group of Whisperers approaching the Hilltop. The guards then grab Kelly to get her safely inside, but are separated from Connie, who hides and takes shelter in the nearby cornfield. At the front of the gate, the Whisperers' leader, Lydia's mother, now known as Alpha, appears unmasked and introduces herself. Alpha announces to the Hilltop residents that she wants only one thing from them: her daughter.

== Production ==
Despite the death of his character in the eighth episode, Tom Payne (Paul "Jesus" Rovia) was credited in the episode, but does not appear. Samantha Morton (Alpha) joins the main cast as of this episode, as her name appears in the opening credits. In addition, the only credited main cast members that appear in this episode are Norman Reedus (Daryl Dixon) and Alanna Masterson (Tara Chambler).

For her role as Alpha, Morton cut and shaved her real hair for this episode. Morton said regarding doing it on camera, "Oh, I loved it. It just feels very real, and what the audience is seeing is real, you know? And there’s emotions about that, but the practicalities for pre-Alpha is that the hair, she’s turning herself into something. She’s metamorphosing from a caterpillar to a butterfly, but not the nicest butterfly, you know? She’s completely changing who she is, and whether that’s trauma and something to do with the brain, or that she just found her true self that she’s able to be because of what’s happening to the world."

In August 2019, the Federal Communications Commission fined AMC Networks $104,000 for misuse of actual or simulated tones of the Emergency Alert System in the episode.

== Reception ==
=== Critical reception ===
"Omega" received positive reviews from critics. On Rotten Tomatoes, the episode has an approval rating of 79% with an average score of 7.15 out of 10, based on 19 reviews. The critical consensus reads: "'Omega' utilizes an unreliable narrator to flesh out the zombie skin-clad fanatic Alpha and succeeds at making her all the more unnerving, but some viewers may find the episode's flashback structure and side plots to be more laborious than revelatory."

=== Ratings ===
"Omega" received a total viewership of 4.54 million with a 1.7 rating in adults aged 18–49. It was the second highest-rated cable program of the night, however, it marked a series low in both viewership and its 18-49 rating.
