= Adaptation (The Walking Dead) =

- The Walking Dead episode
- Episode no.: Season 9 Episode 9
- Directed by: Greg Nicotero
- Written by: Corey Reed
- Cinematography by: Duane Manwiller
- Editing by: Dan Liu
- Original air date: February 10, 2019
- Running time: 52 minutes

Guest appearances
- Eleanor Matsuura as Yumiko; Dan Fogler as Luke; Nadia Hilker as Magna; Brett Butler as Tammy Rose Sutton; Cailey Fleming as Judith Grimes; Matt Lintz as Henry; Cassady McClincy as Lydia; Matt Mangum as DJ

Episode chronology
← Previous "Evolution"	Next → "Omega"
- The Walking Dead season 9

"Adaptation" is the ninth episode and mid-season premiere of the ninth season of the post-apocalyptic horror television series The Walking Dead, which aired on AMC on February 10, 2019. The episode was made available a week earlier on February 3 via AMC Premiere, the network's on-demand service.

== Plot ==
Daryl, Michonne, and the others manage to ward off the walkers from the cemetery, killing four more disguised humans, and recovering Jesus' corpse and the mask from the human who killed him as they leave. As the group head toward the Hilltop, they spot six more walkers following them and lure the group into a confrontation on a covered bridge. Three of the "walkers" turn out to be more humans in disguise. Daryl and Michonne kill two while the third, a young woman, surrenders and is taken prisoner back to the Hilltop.

At Alexandria, Negan finds the streets nearly empty and gathers some supplies, including a compass he takes from Judith's room. As he is about to climb the walls of Alexandria, Judith appears, threatening to shoot him. Negan pleads to let him go, but she warns him there is nothing outside the walls for him. However, Judith does allow him to flee, letting him keep the compass for if he ever loses his way, warning that she will shoot him if she sees him again. Negan retraces his steps back to the Sanctuary, passing the clearing where he had killed Glenn and Abraham, where he gets sick after having drunk river water, and stopping by a town where he is briefly attacked by dogs and a walker, before he continues on to the Sanctuary.

Eventually, Michonne's group returns to the Hilltop. Before they arrived, Tara, Alden, and others planned out search parties to look for the group, with Alden and Luke heading out on the rescue mission. The new threat of humans disguised as walkers is discussed; the girl is locked up and questioned, but she asserts all the others she knew died at the cemetery and the bridge. Eugene is taken to the infirmary to repair his leg. While helping him, Rosita gets sick and rushes outside, followed by Siddiq. Rosita tells Siddiq that she thinks she is pregnant with his child, which Eugene, who has had romantic attractions to Rosita, overhears.

Negan finds the Sanctuary, now completely abandoned. The courtyard is overgrown with weeds while the main room has various pieces of furniture scattered around and pools of standing water. Negan attempts to live alone in the Sanctuary for a short time, but realizes that there is no longer anything there for him after putting down a small group of walkers. He then puts down Richie, a zombified former Savior that had remained on the grounds, and then abandons the Sanctuary for good, leaving on a motorcycle he retrieves from a hidden room and heads back to Alexandria.

The Hilltop prepares to bury Jesus' body and Daryl, upset over the loss, rushes down to interrogate the girl again in earshot of Henry, who is also still locked up for past transgressions. Daryl finds that the girl's mother may still be out there, leading walkers against the various communities. After Daryl leaves, the girl introduces herself as Lydia to Henry and the two start to get to know each other; Daryl overhears this conversation. Meanwhile, on the road back to Alexandria, Negan finds Judith waiting for him; she shoots at him, causing him to fall off his motorcycle but not hitting him directly. Negan picks himself up and admits to Judith that she was right, and he plans to willingly return to Alexandria and his cell as he no longer knows what to do with himself.

After Alden and Luke find arrows from Yumiko embedded in trees, they follow the arrows. However, the arrows draw them directly into a dense part of a forest where humans in walker masks surround them. One of the humans reveals the arrow trail was set up by them, brandishes a sawed-off shotgun at them, and proclaims: "Trail ends here."

== Production ==
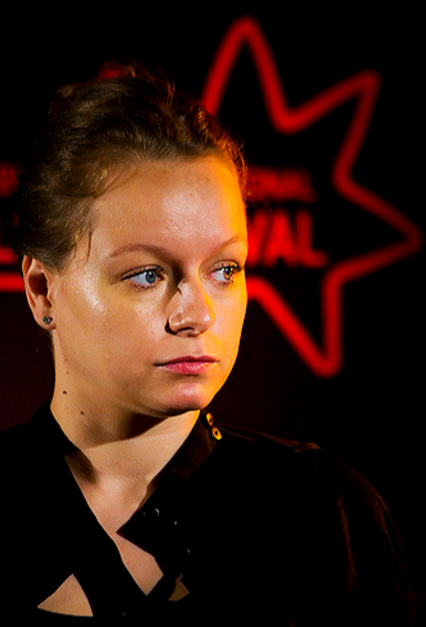
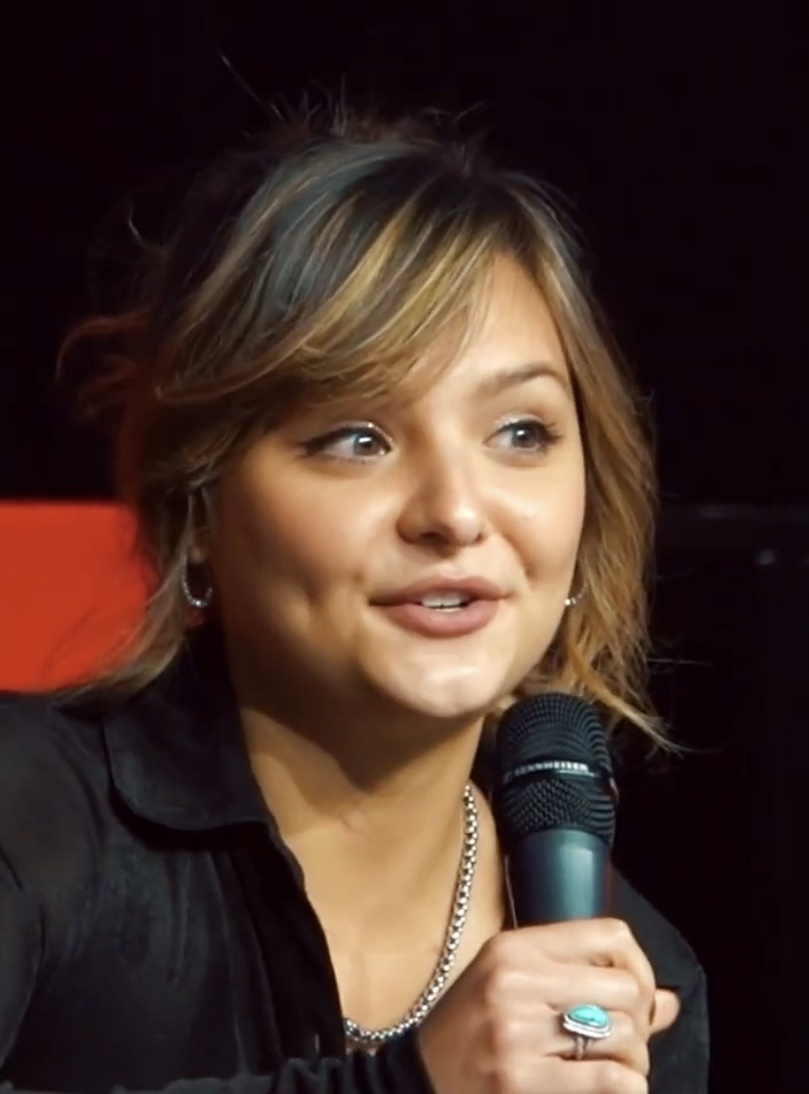
This episode marks the debut of Samantha Morton (left) as Alpha, the leader of The Whisperers, and Cassady McClincy (right) as Lydia, the daughter of Alpha.

This episode marks the first appearance of Samantha Morton as Alpha, the leader of The Whisperers. Her casting was first announced in July 2018. Cassady McClincy also makes her first appearance as Lydia, Alpha's daughter. Tom Payne, whose character Paul "Jesus" Rovia was killed off in the previous episode, appears as the corpse of his deceased character. Showrunner Angela Kang explained: "Tom was great. We could have just done a dummy or something. He was like, 'I'll do it if you want me to. If you want me to be the body in the episode I will be there.'"

== Reception ==
=== Critical reception ===
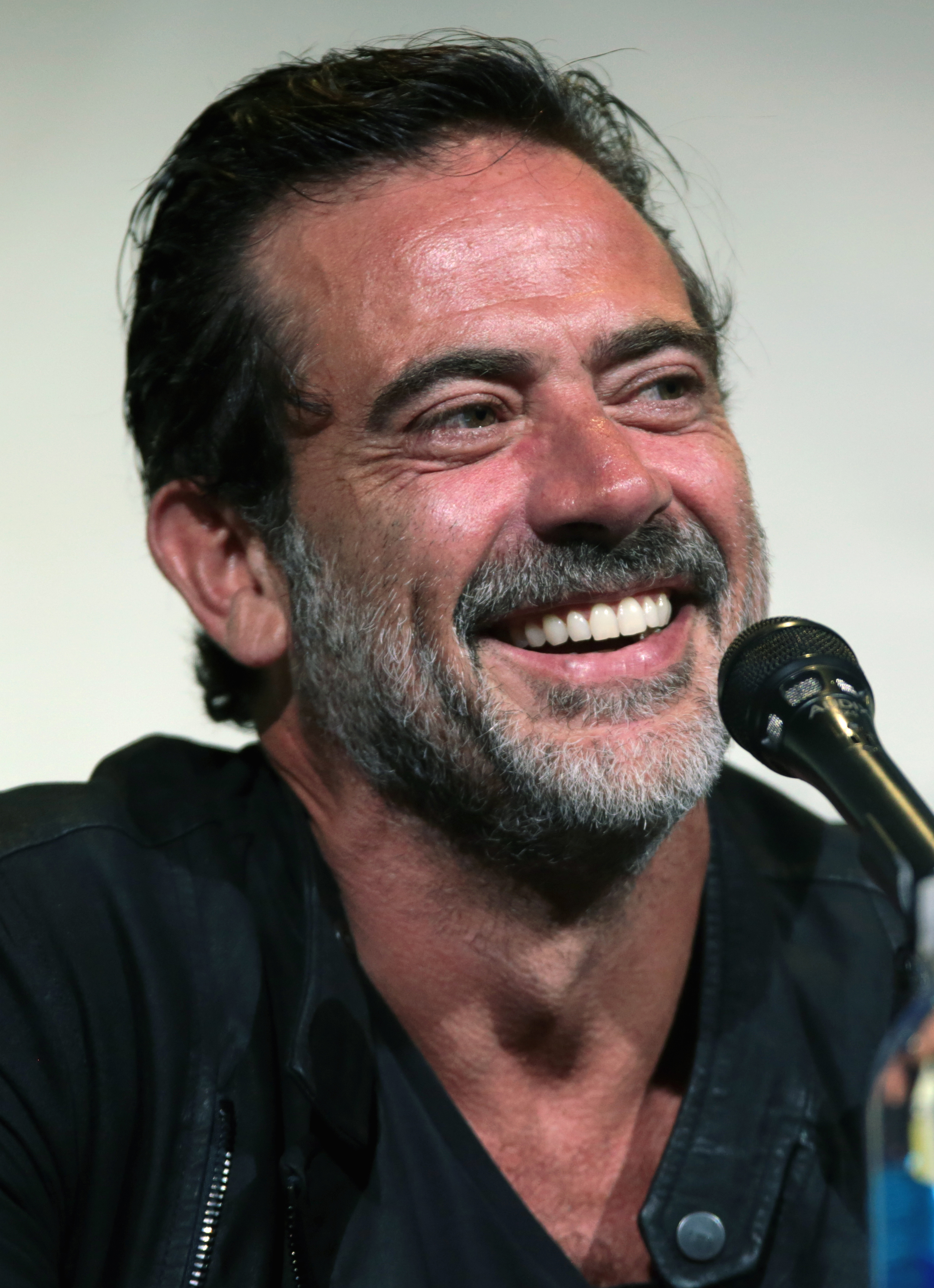
Jeffrey Dean Morgan received praise for his performance as Negan in this episode.

"Adaptation" received positive reviews from critics. On Rotten Tomatoes, the episode has an approval rating of 92% with an average score of 6.80 out of 10, based on 24 reviews. The critical consensus reads: "'Adaptation' creepily fleshes out the Whisperers beyond their rotting camouflage to chilling effect and teases that redemption for the irredeemable Negan may be possible -- adding up to a solid and satisfying return for The Walking Dead."

=== Ratings ===
"Adaptation" received a total viewership of 5.16 million with a 2.0 rating in adults aged 18–49. It was the highest-rated cable program of the night and the episode increased in viewership from the mid-season finale from November 2018. However, it was the lowest-rated mid-season premiere in the show's history.
