= Alpha (The Walking Dead) =

Character appearing in The Walking Dead media franchise

- The Walking Dead character
- Alpha, as she appears in the comic book series (left) and as portrayed by Samantha Morton in the television series (right).
- First appearance: Comic: "Issue #132" (2014); Television: "Adaptation" (2019; The Walking Dead)
- Last appearance: Comic: "Issue #157" (2016); Television: "Dee" (2022; Tales of the Walking Dead)
- Created by: Robert Kirkman
- Adapted by: Angela Kang (The Walking Dead)
- Portrayed by: Samantha Morton

In-universe information
- Occupation: Leader of the Whisperers
- Spouses: Television: Frank
- Significant others: Television: Negan
- Children: Lydia (daughter); Comic: Conner (son-in-law)

Alpha (real name in the TV series universe: Dee) is a fictional character in the comic book series The Walking Dead and the television series of the same name, where she was portrayed by Samantha Morton. In both universes, Alpha is the leader of a group of survivors called the Whisperers, a mysterious group that wears the skins of walkers (zombies) to mask their presence. In the television series, she first appeared in the ninth mid-season premiere.

== Appearances ==
=== Comic book series ===
Alpha is the leader of the Whisperers, a mysterious group of survivors who disguise themselves with zombie skin to blend in with them and not get noticed, and Lydia's mother. She and several of her people approach the gates of the Hilltop Colony, where Lydia has been taken prisoner, and demands her daughter back. When Carl Grimes chases the Whisperers, he is taken prisoner. Alpha decides to infiltrate the Alexandria Safe-Zone and buys a sword at the fair. After meeting with Rick Grimes, she allows Carl and Lydia to leave on the condition that nobody will cross the new border she marked. On their way back, Rick and the group discover that Alpha has decapitated 12 residents of Alexandria, the Hilltop, the Kingdom and the Sanctuary, and that she used their heads placed on pikes to mark the border. After Negan appears to have joined her group, he fatally slashes Alpha across the neck and decapitates her.

=== Television series ===
Alpha is the leader of the Whisperers, a mysterious group of hostile survivors who disguise themselves with the skin of the walkers in order to blend in with them and not get noticed, and the mother of Lydia (Cassady McClincy). She also served as the primary antagonist of the second half of season nine and whole of season ten. Alpha's dark past is shown in flashbacks; it is revealed that she killed her husband Frank (Steve Kazee) and their group of survivors during the initial stages of the outbreak, believing them to be "weak". In the present, she shows up at the Hilltop Colony with some members of her group, demanding that the community return her daughter Lydia, whom the community is holding as their prisoner; Lydia is eventually returned. The Whisperers murder and behead several key members from each community to warn the communities not to cross into Whisperer territory. The beheaded members' heads are placed on spikes, marking the boundary of the new border. Alpha is eventually murdered and beheaded herself by Negan (Jeffrey Dean Morgan), who had formed an intimate relationship with her. He subsequently delivers her head to Carol Peletier (Melissa McBride), with whom he had been working the whole time. Her reanimated head is placed on the pike border by Carol, but it is retrieved and eventually put down by Beta who uses a piece of Alpha's face to fix his own broken walker mask.

==== Tales of the Walking Dead ====
The episode "Dee," taking place between the flashback events of "Omega" and "We Are the End of the World", focuses on Alpha (known at this time by her real name of Dee) and Lydia. Throughout the episode, Alpha is shown narrating the events to a severed head, revealing details of her life such as killing her father at a young age, although Alpha states that he deserved it. In the present of the episode, Dee and Lydia live on a steamboat with a community of other survivors. The community is led by exercise instructor Brooke and enjoys living as if the world has continued on as normal, something that puts Dee at odds with Brooke due to Dee's more realistic view of the world. Lydia is also shown to be terrified of her mother due to Dee's murder of her husband Frank. Dee's growing suspicions of the steamboat's bartender Billy prove to be correct when Billy and his gang attempt to seize the vessel for themselves. Dee saves Brooke and escapes with Lydia, sparking a fight that kills everyone else aside from Brooke. Dee scars Brooke's face in retaliation and, after an encounter with a herd, Dee and Lydia are found by the Whisperers, at this point led by a woman named Hera.

It is then revealed that Dee later murdered Hera and has been narrating to her severed head. Dee turns Hera's face into her walker mask and becomes Alpha, the leader of the Whisperers.

==== Season 9 ====
In the mid-season premiere, "Adaptation", Alpha leads a group of Whisperers who captured Alden (Callan McAuliffe) and Luke (Dan Fogler), luring them into a trap by setting up a trail of arrows for them to follow. She brandishes a sawed-off shotgun at them and proclaims: "Trail ends here." In the episode "Omega", Lydia, who has been captured and held in a cell at the Hilltop Colony, tells her story (shown through flashbacks) to Daryl Dixon (Norman Reedus) and Henry (Matthew Lintz), bonding with the latter in the process. At the end of the episode, at the Hilltop's front gate, Alpha appears unmasked and demands that the Hilltop residents turn over her daughter.

In the episode "Bounty", Alpha demands that the Hilltop residents turn over her daughter Lydia. She explains that she has removed her walker mask to show them that she comes in peace and that she is willing to overlook their trespassing on her lands. Daryl decides to walk outside to talk to Alpha face to face; the two meet. He is initially dismissive of Alpha's demands, as she and her human allies are few compared to the Hilltop forces. However, there are several more of Alpha's allies in wait beyond the tree line, as well as a horde of walkers. Daryl tells Alpha that she cannot have Lydia and informs her that he is ready to fight her people to keep the girl safe. Suddenly, a couple of Whisperers bring forward Alden and Luke. Alpha then offers to trade both of them for her daughter; Daryl reluctantly accepts. As the standoff continues, a baby belonging to one of the disguised women starts to cry, drawing the walkers. Alpha shrugs at the mother, indicating that she should leave the baby to die. Fearing for her life and not having any other choice, the baby's mother decides to abandon him as he continues to cry. Alden and Luke beg Alpha to spare the baby, but Alpha refuses; Connie (Lauren Ridloff) rushes to save the child. Lydia ultimately opts to leave on her own accord and is traded for Alden and Luke. Reunited, Lydia apologizes to her mother, but Alpha slaps her across the face, ordering her to address her as "Alpha" like everyone else. She then smiles at Daryl as they leave.

In the episode "Guardians", as Alpha leads her group back to camp, she questions Lydia about her time at the Hilltop and to reveal any intel she learned while being held captive, but Lydia claims that there was little of interest. Henry eventually catches up with Lydia and the Whisperers, and watches them from a close distance as they rest, but is found and grabbed by Beta (Ryan Hurst), Alpha's second-in-command. Beta brings Henry before Alpha, who questions the boy. Henry reveals that he came alone to get Lydia; Alpha decides that Henry is coming with them. On their way back to camp, Alpha asks Lydia why she did not mention Henry. Lydia explains that he was not worth mentioning, but Alpha reminds her that he just risked his life to save her, so she must be lying. The Whisperers soon arrive back at their camp. There, Alpha taunts a secured Henry and explains to him why they disguise themselves as walkers: "The strong adapt, the weak die." Two of Alpha's subordinates, Sean and Helen, question her about why they went to the Hilltop to give up two strangers up for her daughter. Alpha then reminds them that she did it to get information, but Sean issues a challenge for her leadership role. In response, Alpha confirms that he has the right to challenge her position, but that she also has the right to defend it. Knowing that it was Helen that has been sowing seeds of discontent within the group, Alpha grabs her and decapitates her with a piece of wire. She then hands the head over to a sobbing Sean before fatally stabbing him in the stomach, as Henry looks on in horror. Privately, Alpha tells Beta a story about Lydia when she was three years old. They both then agree that Henry can be useful and that they need to find out if Lydia truly has feelings for him. At night, Beta brings Henry to Alpha. Unmasked, Alpha drops her knife and makes Lydia pick it up, commanding her to prove her loyalty by killing Henry; Lydia picks up the knife and begins to cry. Alpha warns her that Beta will kill them both if she does not kill Henry. Suddenly, a small horde of walkers show up and begin eating the unmasked Whisperers, creating mass confusion. Alpha and the others quickly put on their masks so that they can try to lure the herd away. Moments later, Daryl and Connie arrive disguised as Whisperers to rescue Henry and Lydia.

In the episode "The Calm Before", as the fair at the Kingdom begins, Alpha leads an attack on one caravan from the Hilltop going to the Kingdom. Alpha sneaks into the fair, posing as one of the Alexandria fairgoers from the caravan, and gathers intel. That night, as most of the fairgoers gather to watch a movie, Lydia is saving a seat for Henry when Alpha quietly sits next to her and gestures for her to stay quiet. Outside the theater, Alpha tries to convince Lydia to come with her, but Lydia rejects her. Alpha condemns her as weak, excommunicates her from the Whisperers, and departs. Later, at the Whisperers' new camp, Alpha, now out of disguise, joins her people, and approaches Daryl, Carol, Michonne (Danai Gurira), and Yumiko (Eleanor Matsuura), who were captured by Beta and are now tied to a tree. After announcing that her daughter is no longer a concern, Alpha takes out a shotgun and tells Daryl to come with her alone. At dawn, Alpha leads Daryl to the top of a cliff where a horde of walkers and Whisperers walk beneath them. She tells him that his friends at the camp are fine and that she has marked off a line which is the extent of their lands, but the next time his people cross into her land she will release the horde into theirs. Back in her camp, Alpha begins to tear up over the loss of her daughter. When a Whisperer accidentally witnesses her crying, Alpha kills him to make sure no one ever sees her being weak. Alpha and the Whisperers surprise a total of 12 residents from all three communities, including Henry, and kill them. Alpha leaves their decapitated, zombiefied heads on pikes at the border, meant to signify Alpha's territory boundary. Carol, Henry's adoptive mother, vows to kill Alpha to avenge him. In the season finale, "The Storm", in their camp, Alpha reminds Beta that she will need to be strong for what comes next, and Beta assures her she will be. Per Alpha's request, Beta flogs her arm with a branch to make her stronger, leaving several lashes on her arm, as she used to do to Lydia.

==== Season 10 ====
In the episode "We Are the End of the World", flashbacks portray Alpha's first encounter with Beta. In the present, Alpha orders Beta to collect more walkers from a nearby parking garage, having him take two sisters with him. At the garage, Beta lures the walkers out to follow them, but one of the sisters, Frances (Juliet Brett), the woman whom Alpha had forced to leave her baby behind at the Hilltop, believes she hears a baby crying nearby and panics, causing the walkers to turn on them. Beta rescues Frances and they return to their camp without the walkers. There, Beta is ready to kill Frances, but Alpha gets her to repent and spares her life. Beta follows her to their old camp and discovers Alpha has set up a small shrine to Lydia. Alpha admits that Lydia is still alive, and that she has shown weakness in not attacking the communities. Beta assures her that she was made for this world. Alpha destroys the shrine, and together with Beta, repeat the Whisperers' code: "We Are the End of the World". Alpha assures him that they will soon attack the communities. Just then, they see the fire trail of a fallen satellite nearby, drawing walkers to them. Amidst the chaos, Frances sees a walker wearing a baby carrier and, overcome by grief and anger, attacks Alpha, drawing the attention of the walkers. Frances' sister (Thora Birch) rushes in and pulls Alpha to safety after pushing Frances into the walkers, who kill her. When the Whisperers find shelter, Alpha is impressed with Frances' sister's sacrifice and dubs her "Gamma". The Whisperers go to investigate the fallen satellite and Alpha, pulling her mask off, stares at Carol from across a ravine.

In the episode "Ghosts", Alpha sends Gamma to Alexandria to tell Michonne, Daryl and Carol to meet with her at the border. There, Alpha warns them to not cross her borders again, but proceeds to take more of their land after Carol tries to shoot her. In the episode "What It Always Is", Alpha devises a plan to sabotage the communities. She orders Gamma to pollute the river that the communities use as a water supply with dead walkers; when she returns to the camp to ask for another walker, Alpha offers her a Whisperer she has just killed for questioning her authority. When Gamma shows Alpha her injured hand covered with bandages that Aaron (Ross Marquand) gave her, she states that she understands Gamma's actions, assuming that it was a necessary sacrifice and comments that Aaron could be useful to them.

In the episode "Bonds", when Negan is discovered prowling within her territory, Alpha decides to test him to determine if he is strong enough to join her. When Beta expresses discontent at having the newcomer within the group, Alpha asks if he has finally decided to challenge her to take command of the Whisperers, but he flatly refuses and kneels before her, promising that he will never again question her decisions. Alpha is disappointed when Beta informs her that Negan has died in her final test, but is happily surprised when Negan appears in the camp and kneels before her, swearing his full loyalty; Alpha accepts him as a member of the group.

In the episode "Open Your Eyes", after finding Gamma in the middle of the forest, Alpha asks her for information about Aaron and his community, but is disappointed when Gamma reveals she only managed to find out his name and that he has a daughter. Noticing signs of weakness in her apprentice, Alpha orders Gamma to remove her mask and proceeds to strike her arm so that she stays strong; Alpha reminds Gamma that the enemy is using her and that she should not allow herself to be fooled by Aaron's charms. In the mid-season finale, "The World Before", after questioning Gamma's loyalty to the group, Alpha decides to move the gigantic horde of walkers away from their former location and into a nearby cave. After witnessing her enemies once again enter her territory in search of the horde, Alpha lures Carol into a chase through the forest to the cave. Carol and her group follow her and fall into her trap, finding themselves trapped in the cave and surrounded by the horde.

In the mid-season premiere, "Squeeze", Alpha watches the cave from a distance and orders her people to make sure the group do not escape. After returning to the camp, Alpha tells Beta and Gamma what has happened, assuming that their enemies have been spying on them and entrusting the latter to go to the border to leave a message for their mole in Alexandria. While relieving herself in an impromptu latrine, Alpha receives a visit from Negan, who suggests that the traitor she is looking for might be inside the camp, listing Gamma as his prime suspect. Alpha initially disregards Negan's theory, but later realises he was correct when Beta informs her that Gamma has not reached the border. Promising Gamma will pay for her treachery, Alpha orders Beta to track her down and bring her before her so that she can punish her in front of the entire group. As a way of rewarding him, Alpha escorts Negan to the far reaches of the camp and, aware of the vulgar behavior the man has displayed during his stay in the group, decides to reward him in the same way. Ordering Negan to undress, Alpha approaches him wearing only her walker mask, and they become lovers.

In the episode "Stalker", Alpha and her people prepare a walker herd to attack the Hilltop. Suddenly, Daryl ambushes them, killing her people before engaging her in hand-to-hand combat, where the two both end up seriously injured. Both seeking refuge in an abandoned building, Alpha thanks Daryl for helping her become stronger, but is offended when he accuses her of not loving her daughter. When Lydia appears, Alpha is happy to see her and urges her daughter to kill her in order to take leadership of the Whisperers, but is angered and disappointed when Lydia tells her that the only reason they are talking is so she can say goodbye. Later, after being found by her people, Alpha swears revenge upon the communities and recites the group's motto, declaring war.

In the episode "Morning Star", Alpha and the Whisperers are leading the horde of walkers to the Hilltop when Negan proposes that instead of killing them, she should force them to surrender and join her instead. However, she attacks the community as planned once they arrive. Negan expresses confusion, but Alpha assures him that their enemies will soon join them as part of their horde. In the episode "Walk with Us", Alpha is not satisfied with the aftermath of the Hilltop assault as she still does not have what she wants — Lydia. Negan later captures Lydia and brings Alpha to her supposed location, Alpha intending to kill her daughter so she will always be with her as part of her horde. However, this turns out to be a trap and Negan slits Alpha's throat, killing her. Negan then delivers Alpha's zombified head to Carol, with whom he had been working the entire time.

In the episode "Look at the Flowers", Carol places Alpha's zombified head onto a pike at the border in the same manner Alpha did with the fair victims. She is subsequently haunted by hallucinations of Alpha, representing Carol's wish to die. Beta and two other Whisperers later discover Alpha's severed head. Enraged, Beta grabs one of his men and has Alpha bite him after he calls Beta the "new Alpha". He then carries Alpha's head to a hotel connected to his past as a famous musician and, after "talking" to Alpha, spends the night using his old music to attract a massive herd. In the morning, the deranged Beta "thanks" Alpha before putting her down with a knife to the head. He then removes part of her face and uses it to repair his damaged walker mask.

In the episode "A Certain Doom", Lydia, using Alpha's walker mask, leads Alpha's horde to its destruction with the help of Carol. As the horde is destroyed, Lydia tosses her mother's mask over a cliff. At the same time, after finally being brought down by Daryl, Beta has a series of flashbacks involving Alpha before he is devoured by his own horde.

== Development and reception ==
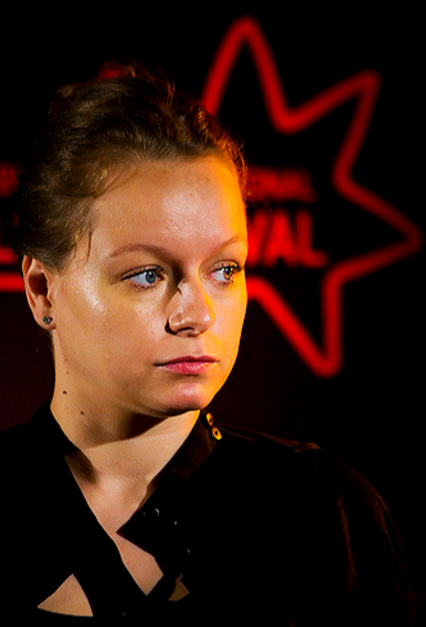
Samantha Morton was chosen for the role to portray the leader of the Whisperers.

Alpha is portrayed by Samantha Morton on The Walking Dead television series, beginning with the ninth season. The episode "Adaptation" marks the first appearance of Morton as the leader of the Whisperers. Her casting was first announced in July 2018.

Morton joined the main cast as of the episode "Omega", as her name appears in the opening credits. For her role as Alpha, Morton cut and shaved her real hair for this episode. Morton said regarding doing it on camera, "Oh, I loved it. It just feels very real, and what the audience is seeing is real, you know? And there's emotions about that, but the practicalities for pre-Alpha is that the hair, she's turning herself into something. She's metamorphosing from a caterpillar to a butterfly, but not the nicest butterfly, you know? She's completely changing who she is, and whether that's trauma and something to do with the brain, or that she just found her true self that she's able to be because of what's happening to the world." On Rotten Tomatoes, the critical consensus for "Omega" reads: "'Omega' utilizes an unreliable narrator to flesh out the zombie skin-clad fanatic Alpha and succeeds at making her all the more unnerving, but some viewers may find the episode's flashback structure and side plots to be more laborious than revelatory." The critical consensus for the following episode "Guardians" reads: "'Guardians' presents dual stories of tested leadership with thematic resonance and provides the malevolent Alpha a plump opportunity to demonstrate her villainy -- although The Walking Dead is still withholding crucial context from viewers longing to understand the motivations of their heroes."

In his review for "The Calm Before", Erik Kain of Forbes wrote: "Alpha uses the woman's scalp and its long golden locks as a disguise. She enters the Kingdom and walks about Ezekiel's fair. She even has a (very creepy) conversation with the King, who doesn't seem to notice how weird this woman is." Writing for Den of Geek, Ron Hogan in his review wrote: "The creative team is able to dial it back, sprinkling moments of hopefulness in front of Alpha. Unlike Lydia, who was taken in by it, she's repulsed, and while it doesn't show on her face, it shows in her actions, and her talk with Daryl at shotgun-point. The very same incidents strike two related people totally differently, and in the denouement of the episode, the very things that lend sweetness and happiness end up causing the greatest in bittersweet pain." Commenting on the decapitation border, Jeff Stone of IndieWire wrote: "It is kind of funny how Alpha seemed to know how important each character was and ordered them accordingly." Alex McLevy of The A.V. Club wrote: "Alpha showing the walker horde to Daryl is a strong narrative conceit, the equivalent of warning your enemy by holding up an ICBM and saying you're not afraid to use it."
