= Tales of the Walking Dead =

American post-apocalyptic drama television series

- Genre: Anthology; Horror; Drama; Zombie apocalypse
- Created by: Scott M. Gimple; Channing Powell
- Based on: The Walking Dead by: Robert Kirkman; Tony Moore; Charlie Adlard
- Showrunner: Channing Powell
- Music by: Morgan Kibby; Daniel Wohl
- Country of origin: United States
- Original language: English
- No. of seasons: 1
- No. of episodes: 6

Production
- Executive producers: Channing Powell; Scott M. Gimple; Gale Anne Hurd; David Alpert; Robert Kirkman; Michael E. Satrazemis; Brian Bockrath
- Production location: Georgia
- Camera setup: Single-camera
- Running time: 43–47 minutes
- Production companies: Illiterate Manifesto; Idiot Box Productions; Skybound Entertainment; Valhalla Entertainment; Circle of Confusion; AMC Studios

Original release
- Network: AMC
- Release: August 14 – September 18, 2022

Related
- The Walking Dead franchise

Tales of the Walking Dead is an American post-apocalyptic horror drama anthology television series created by Scott M. Gimple and Channing Powell. The fourth television series within The Walking Dead franchise, it is a spin-off to The Walking Dead, which is based on the comic book series of the same name by Robert Kirkman, Tony Moore, and Charlie Adlard.

Tales of the Walking Dead aired on AMC between August 14 and September 18, 2022. It is set to be followed by a series titled More Tales from the Walking Dead Universe.

== Premise ==
Tales of the Walking Dead is an episodic anthology series that is based on new and existing characters within The Walking Dead universe.

== Production ==
=== Development ===
In September 2020, AMC announced they and Scott M. Gimple had been developing an episodic anthology series set within The Walking Dead universe. In October 2021, AMC officially greenlit a six-episode first season to debut in mid-2022. Channing Powell, who has written for both The Walking Dead and Fear the Walking Dead, serves as showrunner. In April 2023, it was reported that Gimple would return to oversee anthology series More Tales from the Walking Dead Universe, though it was unclear if this was a subtitle for a potential second season or a separate show entirely.

=== Casting ===
In February 2022, it was announced that Anthony Edwards, Parker Posey, Terry Crews, Poppy Liu, and Jillian Bell had been cast in starring roles. Daniella Pineda, Olivia Munn, Danny Ramirez, Loan Chabanol, Embeth Davidtz, Jessie T. Usher and Gage Munroe later joined the cast in undisclosed roles. In April 2022, it was confirmed that Samantha Morton would reprise her role as Alpha in an episode, and that Lauren Glazier and Matt Medrano had joined the cast.

=== Filming ===
Filming for the series began in January 2022 in Buford, Georgia, with the first episode directed by Michael E. Satrazemis; who has directed several episodes of both The Walking Dead and Fear the Walking Dead. In February 2022, it was confirmed that Satrazemis would direct three of the six first-season episodes, with the remaining episodes directed by Haifaa al-Mansour, Deborah Kampmeier, and Tara Nicole Weyr (who previously directed for Fear the Walking Dead). Later, it was revealed that Ron Underwood would be directing an episode, replacing Weyr. In April 2022, a crew member suffered an accidental injury on set, briefly suspending production. Filming for the season wrapped in April 2022.

== Episodes ==
No.	Title	Directed by	Written by	Original release date	U.S. viewers (millions)
1	"Evie / Joe"	Ron Underwood	Maya Goldsmith & Ben Sokolowski	August 14, 2022	0.572
Joe, a lonely man who has been living in a bunker since before the beginning of the apocalypse, leaves the safety of his home to embark on a 700 mile road trip to meet with a former online friend. On the road, he encounters Evie, who joins him on a similar mission. After Evie initially kidnaps him, the two bond before being separated by the theft of Joe's motorcycle. Evie is unable to find her ex-husband Steven but does find proof that he really loved her. Joe locates his friend Sandra's bunker, but Sandra has been driven insane and become a serial killer targeting men. Evie rescues Joe who is forced to kill Sandra in self-defense. After locking her reanimated corpse in the bunker, Evie convinces Joe that there is more to life and they resume their journey. Cast : Terry Crews as Joe, Olivia Munn as Evie, and Kersti Bryan as Sandra
2	"Blair / Gina"	Michael E. Satrazemis	Kari Drake	August 21, 2022	0.448
Two feuding office employees at an insurance company, receptionist Gina and her boss Blair, caught in a time loop at the beginning of the apocalypse, must work together to save their loved ones and escape the city of Atlanta. After working together to save a large group of fleeing civilians from a herd and facing their respective fears, the time loop is finally broken, although Gina suggests that, alternatively, they may be experiencing a shared delusion. Cast : Parker Posey as Blair Crawford, Jillian Bell as Gina, Kevin L. Johnson as Joel, and Matt Medrano as Brian
3	"Dee"	Michael E. Satrazemis	Channing Powell	August 28, 2022	0.430
Alpha, known then as "Dee", tries to protect her daughter Lydia on the community steamboat they live in post-apocalypse, but grows jealous of another resident, Brooke, who Lydia appears to like and trust more. Dee is alarmed by Brooke's naive view of the current world and attempt to maintain normality despite the dangers. Dee's suspicions of a resident named Billy prove to be true as Billy and his gang attempt to seize the boat for themselves; Dee and Lydia narrowly escape as the residents and the gang wipe each other out, leaving Brooke as the only other survivor. Dee scars Brooke's face for failing to protect her daughter after Lydia stops her mother from killing Brooke. At the end of their rope, Dee and Lydia are found by the Whisperers who are led at this time by a woman named Hera. Dee later kills Hera and turns Hera's face into her walker mask, becoming Alpha of the Whisperers. Cast : Samantha Morton as Alpha, Lauren Glazier as Brooke, Scarlett Blum as Lydia, Rachael Markarian as Jenna, Nick Basta as Billy, and Eric Tiede as Nolan
4	"Amy / Dr. Everett"	Haifaa al-Mansour	Ahmadu Garba	September 4, 2022	0.409
A reclusive scientist and nature documentarian, Dr. Chauncey Everett, accompanies a stranger, Amy, as she tries to find the group of survivors she was separated from in an area of the Wiregrass region now called the Dead Sector. Amy's attempts to connect with Everett are largely unsuccessful as he sees the undead, which he has dubbed Homo mortuus, are the next stage of nature's evolution while humanity is the danger. Everett is focused on saving one of his missing research specimens, dubbed Specimen 21, who is later revealed to be one of his former colleagues, but Specimen 21 is eaten by an alligator. Amy and Everett have a falling out after he stops her from saving two of her friends before Everett reveals that her camp is in the path of a massive herd and is doomed. Amy rushes off to warn her friends, but Everett later discovers that they have fallen to the herd and turned themselves. Everett begins tagging his new specimens for study, including a now undead Amy, although Everett displays some hesitation when faced with his former friend. Cast : Anthony Edwards as Dr. Chauncey Everett and Poppy Liu as Amy
5	"Davon"	Michael E. Satrazemis	Channing Powell	September 11, 2022	0.387
In a small town in Maine, Davon awakens with a head wound and temporary amnesia and shackled to the corpse of a woman named Amanda. After putting Amanda down, Davon hallucinates Amanda talking to him, accusing Davon of murder. In flashbacks, a wounded Davon arrives in town seven weeks earlier and he is taken in by Amanda and her sister Nora with whom he develops a romantic relationship. In the present, Davon finds a zombified boy in Amanda's basement and puts him down before being captured by the townspeople who accuse Davon of murdering their missing children and attempt to execute him. His memories slowly returning, Davon remembers finding Nora's son Garen who escaped while Davon fought off, shackled himself to and accidentally killed Amanda in self-defense when she tried to kill him. Escaping his execution, Davon finds Garen with Amanda's son Arnaud who has been kidnapping and murdering the town's children, convinced that he is sparing them from the horrors of the world while Amanda had been protecting her son. Finding the reanimated bodies of two of Arnaud's victims, Davon summons the townspeople and exposes Arnaud while Garen exonerates Davon. The enraged parents feed Arnaud to his own victims in revenge and the disgusted Davon leaves town. Cast : Jessie T. Usher as Davon, Loan Chabanol as Nora, Gage Munroe as Arnaud, and Embeth Davidtz as Amanda
6	"La Doña"	Deborah Kampmeier	Lindsey Villarreal	September 18, 2022	0.378
Eric and Idalia decide to try to take refuge at the house of an elderly woman, Doña Alma. She agrees to give them food and let them stay the night but insists they must leave the next day. Over dinner, Eric pushes the issue and asks to be allowed to stay for good, but Alma orders them to leave on the spot. She suddenly falls and hits her head, dying instantly. Though Eric is satisfied now having the well-protected house to themselves, Idalia is uncomfortable taking over the deceased woman's house. Idalia experiences various hallucinations and visions as she hears the voice of Alma insisting the house belongs to her. Eric is dismissive until he too begins seeing things, including believing the walker of their friend Maria is actually her back from the dead. The two become hostile with each other as the hauntings persist, but when they try to leave, they are chased into the basement by Alma's ghost. The pair are driven to stab each other and find themselves pulled into branches and walkers of people they met. Cast : Daniella Pineda as Idalia, Danny Ramirez as Eric, Julie Carmen as Alma, and Iris Almario as Maria

== Release ==
=== Broadcast ===
The series premiered on AMC on August 14, 2022. The first episode was released on August 11, on AMC+ and each subsequent episode is made available a week before their AMC air dates.

=== Marketing ===
A teaser trailer was released on April 10, 2022, using the tagline "6 Different Stories, 1 Dead World".

== Reception ==
The review aggregator website Rotten Tomatoes reports a 74% approval rating with an average rating of 5.95/10, based on 29 critic reviews. The website's critics consensus reads, "While these Tales of the Walking Dead are shaggy dog stories of varying quality, there's still enough meat on the bone to justify this expansion of the long-running zombie saga." Metacritic, which uses a weighted average, assigned a score of 61 out of 100 based on 8 critics, indicating "mixed or average reviews".

== Future ==
Tales of the Walking Dead is set to be followed by a separate series, titled More Tales from the Walking Dead Universe.
