= Paul Corley =

American composer and sound artist

Paul Corley is an American composer, producer, and sound artist.

== Biography ==
Corley joined the Icelandic music collective and record label Bedroom Community in 2007, working alongside Nico Muhly, Ben Frost and Valgeir Sigurðsson.

In 2012 Corley released his debut solo album 'Disquiet' and also composed his first score for the theatre, Hreinsun at the National Theatre of Iceland. Textura.org commented on Disquiet as "nothing short of remarkable", while Popmatters made note of how the record "deals more in the silence around the music than the music itself".

Corley has collaborated and produced albums with Oneohtrix Point Never, Gabi, Tim Hecker & Ben Frost. His work with Frost has covered numerous stage works and film scores, including the Palme d'Or nominated Sleeping Beauty, the UK television show Fortitude and the music-theatre adaptation of the Iain Banks novel The Wasp Factory.

He became the music director for Sigur Rós live shows in 2016 and through the success of this collaboration began developing new material with the band for their forthcoming eighth studio album. Corley is also part of the collaborative project Liminal, together with Sigur Rós member Jonsi and composer Alex Somers.

== Discography ==
=== Albums ===
- Disquiet (Bedroom Community, 2012)

h=== Remixes ===

- Atli Örvarsson - Solid Ground (Paul Corley Remix) (Inni Music, 2021)
- Ben Chatwin - Bow Shock (Village Green, 2019)
- Mary Lattimore - Baltic Birch (Paul Corley Remix) (Ghostly International, 2019)
- Penelope Trappes - Nite Hive (Paul Corley Rework) (Houndstooth, 2019)
- Johann Johannsson - …Eins Og Venjulegt Fólk (Deutsche Grammophon, 2018)

=== Filmography ===
- The Snare (2025, with Josh Eustis)
- Mogul Mowgli (2020)

=== As Liminal ===
- Liminal 3 (Krúnk, 2018)
- Liminal 2 (Krúnk, 2018)
- Liminal (Krúnk, 2018)

== See also ==
- List of ambient music artists
