= The Snare (2025 film) =

2025 American crime thriller film

- Directed by: Merlin Camozzi
- Written by: Merlin Camozzi
- Produced by: Merlin Camozzi; Kristifor Cvijetic; Kareem Mortimer; Jenny Leigh Reed
- Starring: Cassady McClincy Zhang as Dani; Dempsey Bryk as Marty; Lucy Walters as Faye; Royce Johnson
- Music by: Paul Corley; Josh Eustis
- Production companies: Grey Star Entertainment; Best Yet Entertainment
- Distributed by: Filmhub
- Release dates: March 16, 2025 (Cinequest); August 21, 2026 (United States)
- Running time: 110 minutes
- Country: United States
- Language: English

The Snare is a 2025 American crime thriller film written and directed by Merlin Camozzi in his feature directorial debut. It stars Cassady McClincy Zhang as Dani, a high school student who is pressured by police into becoming a confidential informant after a drug arrest. The film premiered at the Cinequest Film & Creativity Festival in March 2025, where it won an Audience Award, and was released in select theaters in the United States by Filmhub on August 21, 2026.

== Plot ==
Dani, an 18-year-old high school student with a college scholarship, works at a sandwich shop and helps care for her younger brother while her mother, Faye, works several jobs. After police find a small amount of MDMA on her, officers threaten her with charges unless she becomes a confidential informant. The only dealer Dani knows is Marty, a young man she has feelings for, and she is forced to choose between protecting him and protecting her future.

== Cast ==
- Cassady McClincy as Dani
- Dempsey Bryk as Marty
- Lucy Walters as Faye
- Royce Johnson as Ted
- Elizabeth Stahlmann
- Dominic Bogart
- Esther Zyskind
- Joaopaulo Malheiro as Bison
- Anire Kim Amoda as Carla

== Production ==
Camozzi developed the film over roughly ten years, after reading a New Yorker article about teenage confidential informants. In April 2023, Deadline Hollywood reported that McClincy, Bryk, Walters and Johnson had been cast and that production had wrapped in Schenectady, New York, with Grey Star Entertainment and Best Yet Entertainment producing. The score was composed by Paul Corley and Josh Eustis.

== Release ==
The Snare had its world premiere at Cinequest in San Jose, California, on March 16, 2025. It screened as the East Coast premiere at the Brooklyn Film Festival in 2025 and at Poland's Splat!FilmFest in 2025. Filmhub released the film in select theaters on August 21, 2026, and on video on demand on August 25, 2026.

== Reception ==
On the review aggregator website Rotten Tomatoes, the film holds an approval rating of 100% based on 11 critics' reviews.

Glenn Kenny of The New York Times called the film a "grim and forceful crime drama" and "a potent critique of the tactics used to fight the seemingly never-ending war on drugs", writing that Dani is "played with a mastery of registers by Cassady McClincy Zhang". Previewing the film ahead of Cinequest for The Mercury News, Randy Myers wrote that Camozzi's "stark drama is steeped in truth and toughness". Morgan Rojas of Cinemacy wrote that McClincy Zhang "captures Dani's vulnerability without ever diminishing her strength".

=== Accolades ===
Award	Year	Category	Result	Ref.
Cinequest Film & Creativity Festival	2025	Audience Award: Best Narrative Feature, Thriller, Horror, or Sci-Fi	Won	
