= Carl Grimes =

Fictional character in the comic book series The Walking Dead

- The Walking Dead character
- Carl Grimes, as portrayed by Chandler Riggs in the television series (left) and in the comic book series (right).
- First appearance: Comic: "Issue #2" (2003); Television: "Days Gone Bye" (2010)
- Last appearance: Comic: "Issue #193" (2019); Television: "Rest in Peace" (2022)
- Created by: Robert Kirkman; Tony Moore
- Adapted by: Frank Darabont (The Walking Dead)
- Portrayed by: Chandler Riggs; Oliver Gaffney (Young Carl in "Wrath")

In-universe information
- Occupation: Member of the Militia; Comic: Elementary school student Blacksmith apprentice Messenger for the Commonwealth; Woodcarver; Television: Middle school student
- Family: Rick Grimes (father); Lori Grimes (mother); Judith Grimes (half-sister); Comic: Jeffrey Grimes (uncle); Andrea (stepmother); Amy (step-aunt); Carol (mother-in-law); Maggie Greene (adoptive mother-in-law); Glenn Rhee (adoptive father-in-law); Hershel Rhee (adoptive brother-in-law); Television: Evie (aunt); Michonne (stepmother); Rick Grimes Jr. (half-brother); Violet (pet)
- Spouses: Comic: Sophia Girlfriend later wife only comic best friend série TV
- Significant others: Comic: Lydia; Television: Enid (First Girlfriend)
- Children: Comic: Andrea Grimes II

Carl Grimes is a fictional character and is one of the main protagonists in the comic book series The Walking Dead and was portrayed by Chandler Riggs in the American live-action television series of the same name. The character was created by writer Robert Kirkman and artist Tony Moore, and debuted in The Walking Dead #2 in 2003. In both forms of media, Carl is the son of Rick and Lori Grimes.

In the comic book series, Carl begins as a mean and coldblooded child, but as the events of the zombie apocalypse force him to grow up, he becomes colder, and sometimes makes brash decisions for what he thinks is the good of the group. The character's development is similar in the television series, where he adopts a callous personality, putting him at odds with his father, who wishes to maintain Carl's childhood morality and innocence as much as possible. Upon reflection, Carl eventually regains his sense of morality while still keeping his survival edge. At the same time, his father begins to lose his morality, which eventually puts Carl into conflict with him for various reasons, particularly in regards to helping strangers in need.

Riggs' portrayal of Carl was well received among fans and critics alike. For his performance as Carl, Riggs won the Saturn Award for Best Performance by a Younger Actor in a Television Series in 2014 and 2016. He was also nominated for the Young Artist Award for Best Performance in a TV Series – Leading Young Actor in 2012, 2013, and won in 2014. Carl's death caused backlash from fans due to Carl's importance in the comics.

== Appearances ==
=== Comic book series ===
Carl Grimes, as depicted in the comic book series. Art by Charlie Adlard

Carl is the only son of sheriff Rick Grimes and his wife, Lori Grimes. When the dead rise, Lori takes Carl to a purported safe zone in Atlanta, Georgia, along with Rick's partner, Shane Walsh. Lori and Carl join a group of survivors on the outskirts of Atlanta, formed and led by Shane. There, they are eventually reunited with Rick. Despite being only seven years old, Carl is taught to shoot a pistol. This comes in handy when he saves his mother from an attacking walker. Later, he is forced to kill an unstable Shane in order to protect his father.

After the group buries Shane and leaves Atlanta, Carl is shot and wounded by ranch foreman Otis while searching for supplies in the woods. The survivors are brought to the farm of Otis' employer, veterinarian Hershel Greene, who successfully treats Carl. The group remains at the farm for several days until tensions cause Hershel to evict them.

They eventually find an abandoned prison. While there, Carl and the others enjoy the prison's luxuries, such as hot showers and open space. He is confronted with disturbing experiences, such as witnessing numerous violent deaths. While Rick was away with other survivors, he frequently gave Lori re-assurance about his well-being. Throughout Lori's pregnancy, Carl was thrilled with the idea of a baby sister and when Judith is born he is fiercely protective over her. When The Governor and his army attack the prison, Carl managed to escape with Rick.

During the journey, while returning to Kentucky with Rick and Abraham Ford, he is nearly raped by a group of rednecks before his father manages to kill all of them. In the aftermath of their murders, Carl confesses to killing Shane and being a different person than he was before the apocalypse. Shortly after their return to the main group, Carl witnesses a fellow child survivor murder his brother, and he secretly kills the child when he realizes no one else is willing to do it. He feels deep grief, but does not regret his actions.

When they arrive at a gated community in D.C., Carl is unable to fit in with the other children because of his horrific experiences in the dangerous outside world and the false sense of security the other children had. During a zombie attack, Carl is shot in the face, losing his right eye, and in a coma for weeks. When he wakes up and again is taken care of by Rick, he shows a much more negative outlook, berating his father for all of the horrible things that have happened in his life.

When Rick decides to attack a group of enemy survivors known as the Saviors, they retaliate by killing Glenn Rhee. Rick decides to create the illusion of falling in line with their leader, Negan, but is actually trying to find more information about the group when Carl decides to sneak into one of the Saviors' vans and launch an assault on them, ending with him as Negan's new "guest". Negan takes a liking to Carl, although the feeling is not mutual. Not long after, Carl is returned to Rick unharmed. He accompanies Rick to "The Kingdom", a neighboring settlement led by Ezekiel. There, they plan to go to war with the Saviors. Carl stays back in the Safe Zone while Rick ventures out to Negan's stronghold for war.

After the roughly four-year time gap, Carl decides that he wants to leave the Safe Zone to journey to The Hilltop and start an apprenticeship with Earl Sutton, the blacksmith. Shortly after arriving there, two boys attack him and Sophia, and Carl fights back with a shovel, nearly killing them. He is temporarily held in a cell where he bonds with Lydia, a survivor from a rival group, the Whisperers. After being let out Carl convinces Maggie to let Lydia out under his watch and they bond further; eventually, Lydia seduces him and they make love. Though Carl and Lydia grow even closer after this Lydia's mother "Alpha" arrives at the Hilltop's gates demanding Lydia back or she will attack and Maggie is forced to hand her over, a decision that enrages Carl. Later when Sophia goes to check on Carl he is missing and is revealed to have sneaked out after Lydia.

In the final comic, Carl is an adult and married to Sophia. After killing a wandering walker belonging to Maggie Greene's son Hershel, he faces criminal charges in a society where the threat of zombies is largely ignored and forgotten, but he is cleared of all charges with Michonne being his judge. He is last seen telling his daughter, Andrea Grimes, the story of his father, Rick, and how his efforts paved the way for a safer world for everyone.

=== Television series ===
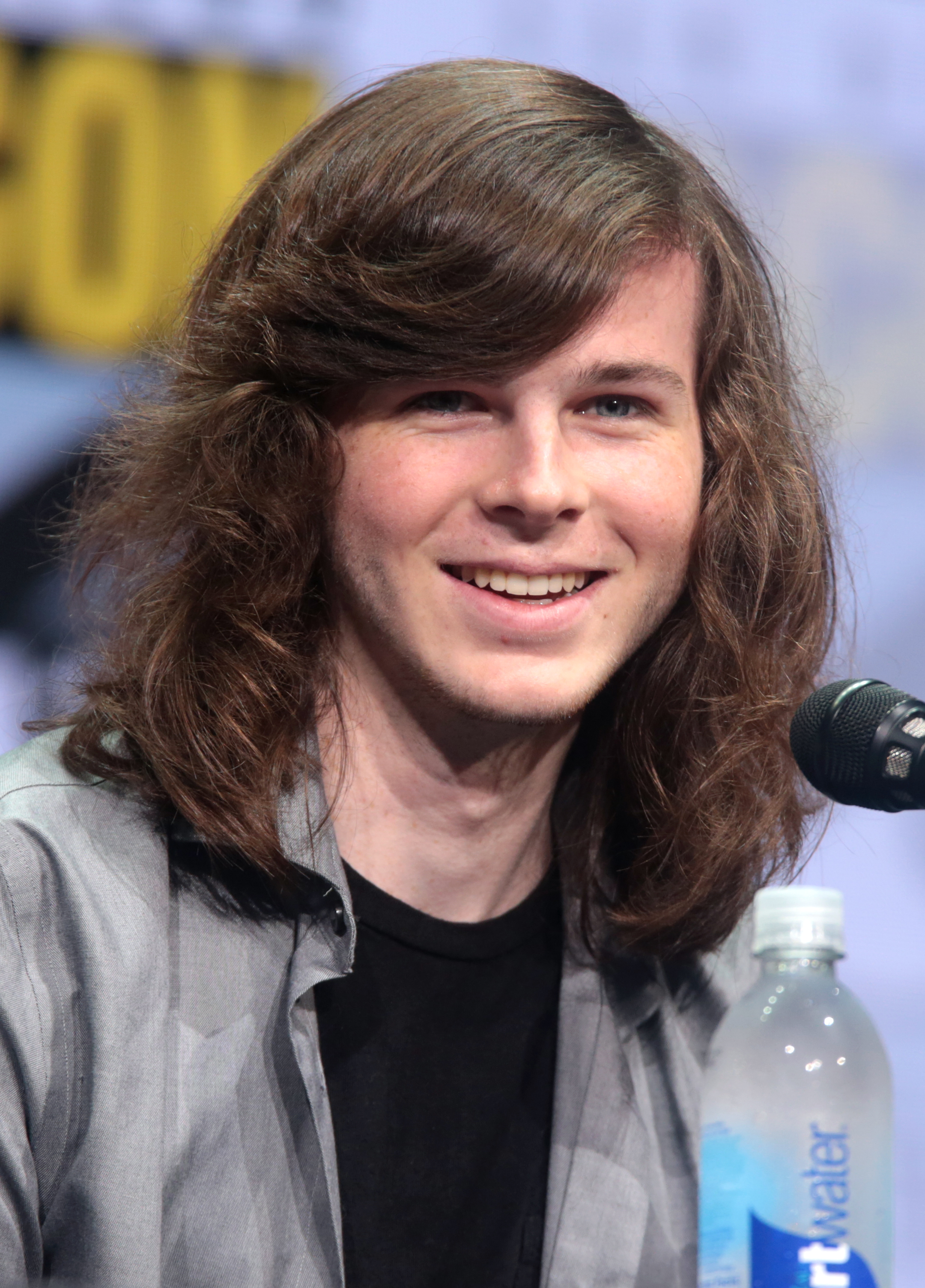
Chandler Riggs portrays Carl Grimes in the television adaptation

Carl is Lori and Rick Grimes' son and Judith's elder half-brother (or brother, depending on whether Judith's father is Rick or Shane). Carl loved both his parents, even though they began to have marital issues. Upon learning of his father's shooting days before the outbreak, he is devastated, even wanting to give a blood transfusion to help which his mother talks him out of. When the outbreak begins, Shane Walsh and Lori take him to the supposed safe zone in Atlanta. On the way there, he is told that his father is dead, and he gradually began to accept it but had little time to mourn. On the way to Atlanta when traffic is backed up Carl, Lori and Shane meet Carol, Ed and their daughter Sophia who Carl quickly becomes friends with. They set up camp with other survivors on the outskirts of Atlanta, Carl begins to look at Shane as a father figure, as he does various activities with him such as fishing and learns some survival skills from him, but appeared to be oblivious to Shane and Lori's ongoing sexual relationship. Carl and Rick are both ambidextrous.

==== Season 1 ====
Carl along with Lori and Shane are part of the survivor group camping in a quarry outside of Atlanta, and has made friends with Sophia, Carol's daughter. When Rick is found and brought back to the camp, Carl is overjoyed to see his father alive, and Lori instructs him to distance himself from Shane. The group is forced to abandon the camp and leave Atlanta.

==== Season 2 ====
As Rick's group heads to Fort Benning, they are forced to hide themselves from a horde of walkers amid a jam-up of cars on a highway, during which Sophia goes missing. The group splits up to search for her, and Carl joins Rick and Shane. They spot a deer, but as Carl approaches it, he is accidentally shot by Otis, a farmhand from Hershel Greene's farm nearby. They race Carl to Hershel who operates to remove the bullet fragments. The operation is successful, but Carl is bedridden for several days, leading Hershel to allow Rick's group to stay on the farm while he heals.

Once Carl heals, he helps out around the farm and the survivor's camp, but Lori notices he has a colder demeanor. Carl becomes more distant from the group. Shane starts to go crazy and opens a locked barn then the group finds that Sophia has become a walker and was herded among other walkers of Hershel's family and friends into his barn, believing they can be cured. Rick's group is forced to put down all of the walkers, including Sophia. Later, Carl heads into the woods alone, finding a walker stuck in a mud pit. He aims a gun to dispatch it but instead tries to taunt it, and the walker lurches forward, freeing itself. Carl runs back to camp but fails to mention the walker. Later that day, Dale is attacked by the same walker, and the group is forced to euthanize him, Carl feels regret for not having killed the walker when he had the chance. Carl learns that Lori is pregnant, but she is unsure if it is Shane's or Rick's child; Glenn and Rick head out to the bar to find Hershel to save Beth after she attempts to kill herself. After their arrival, two "trusted" people from another group draw on them resulting in Rick, Glenn, and Hershel shooting and killing them. As the night continues, more people from their group come looking for them. They leave Randall impaled on a fence in pain as walkers build up. Hershel pulls Randall's leg off to save him. Daryl beats him to gain information about his group of 30 people. Shane decided to lead Randall into the woods snapping his neck and lying to the group by scraping his nose on tree bark saying Randall "hit him and ran off." As rick and Shane arrive back at the farm, Rick calls him out. Shane draws on Rick, then he stabs Shane to death. Shane shoots a gun attracting a large group of walkers as Carl watches. Carl pulls out a gun and aims it at Rick; however, he does this to fire at the reanimated body of Shane who is about to attack Rick. This is when Rick took the scientist's words into perspective. "We are all infected". Daryl and Glenn find no scratches or bites on Randall's undead body. Carl and Rick lead quite a few walkers into the barn. Then Carl burns the barn. Rick's group and the Greenes are forced to abandon it.

==== Season 3 ====
Rick's group comes to an abandoned prison that they make their new shelter, and spend time clearing it of walkers. They also must deal with a few living prisoners, one of whom turns on the group and is abandoned to walkers by Rick. The prisoner gets his revenge by leading walkers into a breach into the prison. The group is forced to split up, and Carl helps to cover Lori and Maggie. The events have caused Lori to enter into childbirth, but she knows she requires a C-section that will likely be lethal, and says her goodbyes to Carl as Maggie operates. Her daughter is born safely, but she dies, and a traumatized Carl is forced to euthanize his mother to prevent her reanimation. When Carl and Maggie regroup with Rick and the others, carrying the child but without Lori, Rick becomes shellshocked, and spends numerous days mourning over Lori's loss and unable to provide leadership. Carl helps to see to his sister, whom he named Judith, while Daryl, Hershell, and Glenn take up leadership roles.

The prison community becomes the target of the nearby Woodbury community, led by the vengeful Governor, who seeks revenge on Michonne, whom the prison group has taken in cautiously. Glenn and Maggie are captured, and Rick leads a group to recover them, leaving Carl in charge. While Rick is gone, Carl encounters a group of survivors led by Tyreese, one who had been bitten by a walker, and he allows them shelter of the prison but locked away from the rest of the group, though says he will ask Rick to evaluate them when he returns. Rick's group returns successfully, but Rick is still troubled by visions of Lori, and when Carl introduces him to Tyreese's group, Carl interprets Rick's cries of "Get out!", which he is shouting at his hallucinations, as his decision to refuse Tyreese's group to stay. Carl leads them out and apologizes for Rick's lack of understanding.

With war between the prison and Woodbury becoming more likely, Rick, Carl, and Michonne drive to Rick's hometown to retrieve weapons from the sheriff's station. Carl remains concerned about Michonne, but Rick seems to trust her. Rick is surprised to find Morgan Jones, the man he first met after waking from his coma, still in his town, and while Rick sees to Morgan, Carl goes to obtain supplies for Judith with Michonne's help. However, his first stop is a local bar to get a photograph of his family as a memento for Judith, but the bar is filled with walkers. Michonne assists Carl in getting the photo safely. As they return to the prison with weapons and supplies, Carl tells Rick that he believes Michonne is one of them, having gained trust in her.

When the Governor attacks the prison, Carl helps in its defense, including killing a terrified teenager compelled to fight when he was advancing on the unarmed Hershel and Judith. Carl later tells Rick he didn't want what happened to Dale, caused by his inaction, to happen to anyone else. The Governor is chased away, and the Woodbury group is integrated into the prison, as Rick finally has come to terms with Lori's death and finally sees Judith as his daughter.

==== Season 4 ====
Despite a population of teenagers at the prison, Carl remains distant from them, having been hardened by his experiences, and instead keeps check on Rick, who has relinquished the group's leadership. Carl wants to assist with killing and fighting. Rick wants him to help the kids during the flu-like outbreak that is lethal to many, which in turn leads to the dead becoming re-animated until appropriate medicine is brought back to stop the illness.

The Governor returns with a new army to attack the prison, holding Hershel and Michonne captive. Rick attempts to make a deal with the Governor's new group. The Governor chops Hershel's head off, saying, "Liar" as Maggie and Beth watch. Rick runs off to kill the Governor. The governor chokes him out, and then Michonne stabs him. The Governor's army ran over the fence infesting the prison with walkers, forcing the survivors to flee separately. Carl finds a heavily injured Rick in the chaos and helps him to walk away, but then they see the empty baby carrier where Judith had been and fear she died. The two escape alone, and eventually come to a suburban neighborhood, taking shelter in a house. Rick is still injured and past the point of exhaustion, so Carl lets him rest while scavenging for supplies in the nearby homes. Eventually, Rick recovers, and the two are elated when Michonne, having tracked them from the prison, joins them. The three spend several times resting and bonding, learning about Michonne having lost her own son in the walker epidemic. However, upon the arrival of a group of scavengers who have discovered their presence, they are forced to flee the house. They come to railroad tracks, with signs pointing to the sanctuary at Terminus, and follow them.

Some days later, they are discovered by the same group of scavengers, who have also captured Daryl. Their leader, Joe, announces that his group will beat Daryl to death and rape and kill Carl and Michonne before killing Rick. The threat of harm to Carl enrages Rick, who tears Joe's throat out, guts Carl's attacker, and kills the rest assisted by Daryl and Michonne. The four continue to Terminus. They near Terminus, but Rick, suspicious of it, buries most of their weapons outside before they approach it. While they are welcomed into the community, they notice they possess items belonging to their friends, and suspect they have been captured. The Terminus people turn on them and force them into a boxcar, where the remains of Rick's group are being held. Rick vows that the Terminus group messed with the wrong people.

==== Season 5 ====
Carol and Tyreese help to rescue Rick's group from Terminus, and when they regroup Rick and Carl are elated to find they have watched and cared for Judith since the Governor's attack on the prison. The group encounters Fr. Gabriel Stokes and spend some time sheltered in his church. Carl is put in charge of defending the survivors when Rick and the others leave to finish off the remains of the Terminus population that are seeking revenge from the group.

The group eventually continues on from the church, heading towards Washington D.C., and suffers a number of hardships along the way. The group is met by Aaron, a recruiter for the nearby Alexandria Safe-Zone, offering the group a place there. While Rick's group is initially skeptical, they are generally welcomed with open arms. Carl helps to take care of Judith as Rick and the others improve Alexandria's security. Carl meets some of the teenagers in the community, including Enid, a girl who had been wandering on her own after seeing her parents killed by walkers. Carl finds something of interest in Enid, and discreetly watches her, and when she climbs over the fence of Alexandria, he follows her. She remains emotionally distant, but accepts Carl's friendship and returns to the community.

==== Season 6 ====
Rick's people have been placed into positions of leadership around Alexandria due to their superior survival skills, and one of Rick's first acts is to round up and herd a large group of walkers from a nearby quarry far away from the community. Carl remains in Alexandria to watch over Judith and the other Alexandria residents. An attack by the Wolves, a feral group that attacks settled communities, disrupts Rick's plan. The Alexandria wall is breached and walkers swarm in. Rick and Michonne race back to the community to help protect it, joining Carl as he, Judith, Gabriel, Deanna Monroe and Jessie Anderson and her two sons Ron and Sam attempt to escape to an upper floor of a house and escape. Deanna, who already knew she was dying, sacrifices herself to give the others time to escape by covering themselves in viscera from dispatched walkers to fool the horde. They get far enough to allow Gabriel to take Judith to the secured church safely so that they can then seek out other survivors, but a panicked Sam does not want to leave with Gabriel and instead insist on staying with their mother. This leads to walkers attacking the group, killing Sam and Jessie. Ron, enraged to see his family killed, pulls a gun and shoots Carl in the eye, before Michonne kills him. Carl is rushed to safety, and eventually Rick and his allies clear out the walkers.

Over the next several months, Alexandria resecures its walls. Carl loses his eye, but is otherwise unharmed, and continues to develop a friendship with Enid.

Rick's group comes to learn of the Saviors, a survivor group that use violence to coerce other communities to provide them offering of food and supplies on a regular basis. As a part of the group goes on the hunt for Saviors, Maggie starts having complications with Glenn's unborn child. Carl joins Rick, Maggie, Glenn and others as they set off for the nearby Hilltop community, with whom they have made friendly ties. They run into traps set by the Saviors, and soon Rick's group, including those who went looking for the Saviors, are forced to kneel before Negan, the leader of the Saviors. He plans on killing one of them with "Lucille", a baseball bat wrapped in barbed wire, to force them into servitude, and threatens to cut out Carl's other eye and feed it to Rick should any of them intercede.

==== Season 7 ====
After a random choice, Negan kills Abraham, and when Daryl tries to punch Negan in revenge, Negan then kills Glenn in retaliation. While the rest of the group is held at gunpoint, Negan takes Rick on a short trip to convince him to submit, and on his return, demands that Rick cut off Carl's arm as a show of agreement to the Savior's terms, or else he will kill the entire group. Rick tearfully prepares to cut off Carl's arm, but Negan stops him at the last moment, assured that Rick will now follow his orders. The Saviors leave them, but plan to show up at Alexandria for their offerings.

When the Saviors first arrive, they proceed to take much more than anticipated, and Carl yells at Rick for being willing to put up with this. Carl attempts to sway one Savior named David at gunpoint from taking nearly all the medicine. Negan sees this, and tells Carl that he is impressed by his courage, but he cannot tolerate anyone threatening his group and warns him that he will kill another Alexandrian if he dares pull the trigger in which Carl stands down but because of his actions, Negan has the Saviors confiscate all of the guns from Alexandria and including the ones they took from their satellite outpost. Later, Carl helplessly watches Enid being bullied by David who has her green balloons. After the Saviors leave, Carl sees Enid leaving Alexandria, and when he catches up to her, he finds out that she wants to go to Hilltop to visit Maggie and Sasha. He accompanies her there, explaining his desire to kill Negan. They arrive at Hilltop just as the Saviors are there collecting their weekly offering. Carl decides to stowaway aboard one of the trucks when they drive away, discovering that Jesus, one of the Hilltop survivors, is also there, seeking the location of Sanctuary, the Savior's base. As they near Sanctuary, Carl tricks Jesus into getting off the truck.

When the trucks get to Sanctuary, Carl starts attacking, killing two of the Saviors before he is restrained. Negan again shows appreciation of Carl's courage, and forces Carl to talk about how he lost his eye, and then into how he lost his mother; Carl avoids speaking about Judith during this. Negan decides to return Carl to Alexandria and takes several men there, arriving earlier than expected for their next supply run. As Rick has gone with Aaron to find more supplies, Negan decides to wait by making himself at home in the house Rick and Carl occupy, and Carl is unable to stop him from discovering Judith. Negan uses this information to help put more sway over Rick once he returns. After Negan leaves, Rick, encouraged by Michonne and Carl, decides to take a stand against the Saviors, and starts to find allies and weapons. Eventually, the Alexandria community is joined by the Hilltop and the Kingdom to stop an attack by the Saviors and their allies, the Scavengers, against Alexandria, and the three communities declare war against the Saviors.

==== Season 8 ====
While Rick organizes the combined forces of Alexandria, the Hilltop, and the Kingdom against Negan, Carl becomes more concerned with the safety of others, making sure that the remaining survivors of Alexandria are prepared. At some point, Carl and Rick are out searching for gas but come across a man named Siddiq, alone and seemingly confused. Rick is prepared to shoot him, but Carl stops him and berates Rick for not showing compassion. Later, as Rick's army attacks the Saviors, Carl encounters Siddiq again, and after learning his hardships, offers to take him to Alexandria. As they make their way back, they run into a small group of walkers, one of which manages to bite Carl on his abdomen before they can fend it off. Carl keeps the bite hidden from Siddiq and others. Knowing his death is imminent, he spends time with Judith, and writes several letters to his loved ones.

Negan and the Saviors eventually escape Sanctuary and assault Alexandria. Thanks to Carl's planning and distractions, most of the Alexandrians are able to make it to the shelter of sewers as the community is firebombed by the Saviors. Eventually, Rick and Michonne make their way back and follow the others into the sewers, where Carl is forced to show them the walker bite. Daryl prepares to lead the other Alexandrians to the Hilltop, but tells Carl he helped to make this all possible. With Carl too weak to make the trip, Rick and Michonne take him to the Alexandria church, and Carl implores Rick to show mercy and compassion, hoping to make him a better man. Rick and Michonne go outside to deal with their grief as Carl shoots himself in the head with the same gun he has had since he was a child. Rick and Michonne then bury his body next to the church. The shocking news of his death reaches the communities and even Negan. In the eighth-season finale, Rick reads Carl's note to him about the future. When Alexandria, The Kingdom, Hilltop, and Oceanside go to war with the Saviors for the last time, Rick and Negan talk about Carl's dream, which almost brings Negan to tears. Rick slits Negan's throat but spares his life, just as Carl wanted. Later, Rick mentions that Negan will not be killed or harmed as Carl found him to be redeemable. With the Saviors finally defeated, Rick thanks his son for allowing him to be his father.

==== Season 9 ====
Two years after Negan's defeat and imprisonment, Rick has continued to honor Carl's legacy by keeping the joined communities working together, despite any inner turmoil amongst the Saviors. However, even though Rick's allowing Negan to live was done to honor Carl, Daryl and Maggie are still hellbent on killing him to avenge Glenn's death. When Maggie is going to Alexandria to kill him, Rick and Daryl argue about her plan and Rick is brought to tears in saying that by killing Negan, Carl died for nothing. Daryl tells Rick that he'd die for him and that he would have died for Carl, but urges him to let his son's dream for the future go. When Rick is gravely injured by being impaled on a piece of rebar, Carl appears in Rick's hallucination as one of the many corpses piled together that he stands upon.

Six years after Rick's apparent death, Carl is mentioned by Judith when she admits to Michonne that she is starting to forget both Carl and Rick's voices. During the time-skip, Michonne has given birth to Carl's half-brother, Rick "R.J." Grimes Jr., who was conceived shortly before Rick's disappearance. Negan continues to be a prisoner in Alexandria, and he shares an amicable relationship with Judith, telling her stories about the past that an overprotective Michonne keeps from the young girl. Negan later berates Michonne for not telling Judith more about her father and brother, calling Judith just as much of a badass as Carl was. The older Judith has taken to wearing Carl's old hat that he had left to his sister before dying.

==== The Walking Dead: The Ones Who Live ====
Carl appears in the form of flashbacks after Rick encounters Jadis in a park in the Civic Republic. After reuniting with Rick, Michonne learns from an artist named Benjiro that Rick had tried to have him draw Carl, just like Benjiro drew Michonne and Judith for Rick, but he could never quite get Carl right. An emotional Michonne reveals Carl's name to the man.

Rick later admits that he used to see Carl in his dreams when he was first taken by the CRM and it kept him going. However, Rick "lost" Carl over time and started dreaming of Michonne instead, only to lose her too. In order to help inspire Rick to return to Alexandria with her, Michonne reveals that she had Benjiro create a portrait of Carl on an old iPhone which she gives to Rick. This causes Rick to recall happy memories with his son and finally agree to return home with his wife.

== Development and reception ==
Carl's character development has been well received in both mediums.

In "Judge, Jury, Executioner", Carl evolves into a desensitized character and ultimately relinquishes his naïveté to the world around him. Although Entertainment Weekly writer Clark Collis drew parallels to a serial killer, Kirkman suggested this was an initiative to give more screen time to the character. He said Carl was "one of the most fun characters to tell stories about in this world." He continued: "It's true of the comic and it's true of the show. Over time, we're going to start to see more and more of this kid. What's awesome about that is, think about what it would be like to grow up in this world. It's one thing to have everything you know taken away from you and have to deal with this s—y world you now have to live in. But to have barely even really recognized what the world is and how it works and what to expect and then to be thrust into this apocalyptic threat and to grow up and mature with these kinds of situations. It's going to make him grow up weird, is what I like to say."

When it was discovered that Carl was going to be killed off after the season 8 midseason finale, fans were upset by the loss of the character, which is a significant departure from the comics, where Carl is still alive and takes on more of a leadership role as Rick ages, even outliving his father by the end of the comics.
