= Lydia (The Walking Dead) =

- The Walking Dead character
- Lydia, as she appears in the comic book series (left) and as portrayed by Cassady McClincy in the television series (right).
- First appearance: Comic: "Issue #133" (2014); Television: "Adaptation" (2019)
- Last appearance: Comic: "Issue #193" (2019); Television: "Rest in Peace" (2022)
- Created by: Robert Kirkman
- Adapted by: Angela Kang (The Walking Dead)
- Portrayed by: Cassady McClincy (The Walking Dead); Havana Blum (younger in The Walking Dead); Scarlett Blum (younger in The Walking Dead and in Tales of the Walking Dead)

In-universe information
- Occupation: Student; Comic: Messenger for the Commonwealth
- Family: Alpha (mother); Television: Frank (father)
- Spouses: Comic: Conner
- Significant others: Comic: Carl Grimes; Television: Henry; Elijah

Lydia is a fictional character from the comic book series The Walking Dead and the television series of the same name, where she is portrayed by Cassady McClincy.

== Appearances ==
=== Comic book series ===
Lydia is one of the Whisperers to follow Paul "Jesus" Monroe, Darius and two other guards. She is captured by Jesus. She is put in a cell next to Carl's. She tries to get information about the Hilltop community by talking to Carl, and starts a sexual relationship with him. After the war against his group, Lydia goes to the ranks of Rick's group and survives to the end of the story. Carl's lingering feelings for Sophia finally ends their relationship, although they remain close friends.

=== Television series ===
Lydia is a survivor who, along with her parents, "Alpha" and Frank, survived the initial stages of the zombie apocalypse. After 23 days of the initial outbreak, Lydia and her parents remained in a moldy basement with a group of survivors. After Frank dies, Alpha raises Lydia with cruelty, treating her more like her servant than her child, to the point of making Lydia call her "Alpha" instead of "momma". After being captured by Daryl Dixon and Michonne, and kept as a prisoner in a cell at the Hilltop, Lydia begins to form a bond with Henry. Lydia and Henry fall in love and begin a relationship, with her ultimately rejecting the Whisperers in favor of the other communities who agree to grant Lydia asylum. Lydia rejects the Whisperers completely and is disowned by her mother. However, her relationship with Henry is cut short when Alpha brutally murders him and several other residents of Hilltop.

==== Tales of the Walking Dead ====
In the episode "Dee," taking place between the flashback scenes of "Omega" and "We Are the End of the World," Lydia and her mother live on a steamboat run by a woman named Brooke. Lydia is nearing her ninth birthday and bonds with Brooke while remaining fearful of her mother, currently going by her real name of Dee, due to Dee's murder of Lydia's father Frank. Lydia enjoys the community's efforts to recapture the pre-apocalypse world, although Dee sees Brooke as a bad influence on her daughter and has a much more realistic view of the world, although at this time, Dee has been trying to be a good person and mother rather than being as ruthless as she usually is as Alpha. Dee's violent reaction to a suspicious bartender named Billy sends Lydia into hiding when it stirs up bad memories for her. However, Dee proves to be right about Billy who returns to take the boat for himself and demands that Dee and Lydia be handed over. Dee manages to escape to shore with Lydia while a fight breaks out that decimates both sides.

On shore, Dee and Lydia narrowly avoid a herd that devours the survivors by hiding under a corpse. After they discover that Brooke is the only other survivor, Lydia stops her mother from killing Brooke and remains defiant towards Dee. Lydia refuses to learn how to fight a herd and runs off, causing Dee to realize her mistakes and that this is no world for a child. As Dee prepares to kill Lydia and then herself, they are surrounded by the Whisperers, currently led by a woman named Hera. Hera and the Whisperers take in Dee and Lydia with Dee eventually killing Hera and becoming Alpha, the leader of the Whisperers.

==== Season 9 ====
In the mid-season premiere, "Adaptation", as Daryl, Michonne, and the others return to the Hilltop, they spot six walkers following them and lure the group into a confrontation on a covered bridge. Three of the "walkers" turn out to be humans in disguise. Daryl and Michonne kill two while the third—Lydia—surrenders and is taken prisoner back to the Hilltop. Lydia is locked up and questioned by Daryl. After Daryl leaves, Lydia introduces herself to Henry and the two start to get to know each other; Daryl overhears this conversation. In the episode "Omega", Lydia describes her backstory to Henry while both are in the community prison, unaware Daryl is listening in.

As Lydia explains, Henry starts to become more compassionate towards Lydia. Daryl continues to talk to her as well, trying to scope out the size of her group as Lydia claims that they may be coming to save her. He finds her arm covered in marks, which she says came from her mother. Daryl, who had been similarly beaten as a child, displays sympathy for Lydia's abuse, but she remains uncooperative. Lydia's story is told in flashbacks that date to the months after the walker outbreak. Henry decides to let Lydia out of her cell for a while and discreetly shows her what the Hilltop has to offer. While Lydia has an opportunity to take a hammer and strike Henry with it to escape, the cries of a baby cause her to panic, and she begs to be returned to her cell. She asks Henry to stay with her through the night. When morning comes, Daryl returns and Lydia states that she doesn't think her mother will be coming. Lydia then tells them that she had lied about her history. Lydia mentions where her mother and her people may be camped, but notes that they frequently move about.

In the episode "Bounty", Lydia's mother, Alpha, arrives at Hilltop with some of the Whisperers and demands the release of Lydia. Inside the Hilltop, Daryl discovers that Henry and Lydia have escaped. Enid and Addy are able to track down Henry and Lydia to an abandoned house near the Hilltop, where Henry has provided Lydia a new set of clothes. Lydia opts to return to Hilltop of her own accord and is returned to Alpha in exchange for the return of Alden and Luke, two Hilltop residents being held prisoner by the Whisperers. Reunited, Lydia apologizes to her mother. Alpha slaps her across the face, ordering her to address her as "Alpha" like everyone else does.

In the episode "Guardians", as Alpha leads her group back to camp, she questions Lydia about her time at the Hilltop, but Lydia claims that she has little information of interest. Henry eventually catches up with Lydia and the Whisperers, but is found and captured by Beta, Alpha's second-in-command. Henry reveals that he came alone to rescue Lydia. Alpha decides that Henry is coming with them. On their way back to camp, Alpha asks Lydia why she didn't mention Henry. Lydia explains that he wasn't worth mentioning, but Alpha reminds her that he just risked his life to save her, so she must be lying. The Whisperers soon arrive back at their camp. At night, Beta takes Henry to Alpha. Unmasked, Alpha drops her knife and makes Lydia pick it up, commanding her to kill Henry with it so that she can prove what side she's on; Lydia picks up the knife and begins to cry. Her mother warns her not to be weak and that Beta will kill them both if she doesn't kill Henry. Suddenly, a small horde of walkers show up and begin eating the unmasked Whisperers, creating mass confusion. Alpha and the others quickly put on their masks so that they can try to lure the herd away. Moments later, Daryl and Connie arrive disguised as Whisperers to free and rescue Henry; they prepare to retreat. Daryl grabs Henry, who grabs Lydia, and together the four escape.

In the episode "Scars", Daryl, Connie, Henry and Lydia take shelter at Alexandria. That evening, Daryl, Connie, Henry and Lydia depart for the Kingdom.

In the episode "The Calm Before", after the fair at the Kingdom begins, Alpha sneaks into the fair by posing as an Alexandria resident. That night, as most of the fairgoers gather to watch a movie, Lydia is saving a seat for Henry when Alpha quietly sits next to her and gestures for her to stay quiet. Outside the theater, Alpha tries to convince Lydia to leave the Kingdom with her, but Lydia rejects her. Alpha tells her she is not strong and is no longer part of her group, and departs. Later, Daryl's group finds a line of ten severed heads on pikes, one of which is Henry's. Sometime later, Daryl and Lydia return to the border. Lydia leaves the necklace Henry made for her on the ground by the pike that once held Henry's head.

In the season finale "The Storm", Ezekiel makes the decision to abandon the Kingdom, assembling a large caravan of the remaining survivors to seek out better shelter at the Hilltop. Lydia wanders into the forest and finds a walker half-buried in the snow. She takes off her glove while crying and offers her hand to the walker to commit suicide, but stops when Carol appears and follows her back to the group. Using the cover of the storm, the Kingdom's group passes the pikes into Alpha's territory, finding only frozen walkers along the way, and arrive at a river that has been frozen over. Carol goes looking for Lydia, who has disappeared. She eventually catches up to Lydia, who believes that she is to blame for their situation and feels she can't stay with them. Since she cannot go back to her mother, Lydia asks Carol to kill her, but Carol refuses Lydia's request and tells her that she is not weak.

==== Season 10 ====
Although now a resident of Alexandria, Lydia is often distrusted and bullied, particularly by the other teenagers of the community who lost their friends in Alpha's massacre despite Lydia's protestations that she had truly loved Henry. Lydia bonds with Negan over them both being outcasts and Negan rescues Lydia from an attack by her vengeful bullies, accidentally killing one of them in the process, but also putting Negan's own life on the line. Lydia's testimony proves to be enough to convince Daryl to spare Negan, but he escapes before a final decision can be made and joins the Whisperers. Daryl continues to look after Lydia and act as a father figure towards her while Michonne in particular seeks to keep her safe, knowing that Lydia's presence may cause Alpha to hesitate to attack.

During this time, Lydia helps to defend the communities, having taken up Henry's old fighting staff as her weapon and adopting the fighting style that he had learned from Morgan Jones. Carol's attempts to manipulate Gamma by revealing Lydia's survival to her causes Lydia to abandon the communities and take off on her own, but she later returns, although she can't bring herself to kill her mother. During the Whisperer attack on the Hilltop, Lydia joins in the defense and suffers an injured leg. She is later captured by Negan who leads Alpha to where he is supposedly keeping Lydia with Alpha planning to kill her daughter so that she will rejoin the Whisperers as a walker. However, this turns out to be a trap and Negan kills Alpha. Lydia manages to escape before Negan can return and alerts Daryl who confronts Negan, learning that Negan was working with Carol to infiltrate the Whisperers in order to assassinate Alpha and had used Lydia to draw her out.

In the aftermath of her mother's death, Lydia is left with conflicted feelings as she truly loved Alpha despite everything. When the Coalition's base the Tower comes under siege by Beta and his massive horde, Lydia helps direct the Coalition's archers in providing covering fire against the Whisperers, picking a few Whisperers out of the horde for them. Lydia urges Negan to help and he provides her with Alpha's Whisperer mask. Using the mask, Lydia infiltrates the horde and joins Carol, Daryl and the rest of their team in diverting the horde. When the Whisperers destroy their makeshift sound system, Lydia offers to lead the horde away herself, having been trained in how to do it by her mother despite the fact that it is very likely to be a suicide mission. As the others assassinate the Whisperers one by one, Lydia diverts the herd and is saved from retaliation by Beta by Negan and Daryl who finally take Beta down. With the Whisperers defeated, Lydia leads the horde to a massive cliff where Carol takes over, intending to sacrifice herself to finish the job. Lydia saves Carol's life and together the two watch the destruction of the Whisperers' ultimate weapon. As the horde is destroyed, Lydia tosses her mother's mask over the cliff as well. Returning to the others, Carol hails Lydia as the one responsible for the end of the horde's threat and Negan tells Lydia that he intends to stick around for now.

After the defeat of the Whisperers, Lydia can briefly be seen helping the wagons carrying the survivors back home and helping to rebuild the badly damaged Alexandria.

==== Season 11 ====
With Alexandria badly damaged by the Whisperers and their food supply destroyed, Lydia, now a fully accepted and respected member of the community, joins the efforts to gather replacement food supplies, participating in the mission to a military base. When a team returns to the ruins of the Hilltop in search of blacksmithing supplies to try to fix Alexandria's damaged wall, Lydia joins them and they discover a small faction of surviving Whisperers squatting in the ruins. Lydia recognizes their leader, Keith, as a Whisperer who was kind to her behind Alpha's back and not a part of her mother's inner circle. Lydia is horrified by the barbarity that her vengeful friends show to Keith, but Keith proves to be more understanding. Later, when a herd breaches Alexandria during a massive storm, Lydia participates in defending the survivors taking refuge inside of a house. When Aaron falls into trouble, Lydia escapes through a window and comes to his rescue. When the team who went to Meridian returns, Lydia is visibly disappointed and upset by Negan's choice to take off on his own.

After the communities make contact with the Commonwealth, Lydia moves to the Hilltop and joins in Maggie's efforts to rebuild the community. Maggie's young friend Elijah develops a crush on Lydia who considers leaving to join the Commonwealth. However, the arrival of a dying young man leads Maggie, Lydia and Elijah to the community of Riverbend which is under siege by the Commonwealth Army with Gabriel and Aaron caught in the middle. Lydia is reunited with Negan who now lives in Riverbend with his pregnant wife Annie. Lydia and the others help the Riverbend residents to defeat the invaders and Lydia helps them to hide in an old Whisperer hideout in the aftermath and then helps Maggie, Elijah and Marco to fight off an invasion of the Hilltop by Commonwealth soldiers and Leah Shaw. When Lance Hornsby seizes control of Alexandria, the Hilltop and Oceanside, Lydia is amongst a group that remains outside of the Commonwealth's control to fight back.

After the defeat of Lance Hornsby, Lydia joins Aaron, Jerry and Elijah on a supply run to Oceanside. Lydia and Elijah continue developing feelings for each other, but Lydia resists the idea of a romantic relationship with him due to her lingering love for Henry. While stopping to avoid a herd, Aaron gives Lydia advice based upon his own romantic relationship with his late husband Eric Raleigh. Following an attack by a variant walker, Lydia finally accepts her feelings for Elijah and kisses him, starting a relationship with Elijah.

Shortly thereafter, the group encounters Luke and Jules who reveal that Oceanside has been taken over by Commonwealth forces. With Commonwealth soldiers searching the area, Lydia has the group cover themselves in walker guts and move with a nearby herd as a cover. However, the soldiers begin leading the herd towards the Commonwealth. Unbeknownst to everyone, the herd contains a number of variant walkers, one of which picks up a knife that Lydia drops. Trying to hide in an abandoned RV, the group is separated, and Lydia is bitten in the arm while trying to pull Elijah in. Jerry is forced to amputate Lydia's arm and leaves to find the others while Aaron remains behind with Lydia. Aaron and Lydia eventually manage to make their way through the herd to where it is overrunning the Commonwealth, only to learn that Luke and Jules are dead, and that Jerry and Elijah are still missing. Lydia receives medical treatment for her amputated arm and survives both it and the bite, but she is left despondent by Elijah's continued absence and the thought that someone she loves might once again be dead. After Pamela Milton's defeat, Lydia is finally reunited with Elijah who arrives with Jerry as the herd closes in on the part of the Commonwealth that most of the survivors are taking refuge in. Lydia joins the successful effort to destroy the herd and save the Commonwealth.

A year later, Lydia who is now wearing a prosthetic left arm is living in the rebuilt Hilltop with Elijah whom she remains in a relationship with. Visiting Alexandria, she delivers a package from Negan to Judith.

== Development and reception ==
Lydia is portrayed by Cassady McClincy on The Walking Dead television series, beginning with the ninth season. She makes her first appearance in the episode "Adaptation".

Erik Kain of Forbes reviewed the episode "Chokepoint" and asserted that Lydia's relationship with Henry appeared "to have popped out of nowhere and blossomed much too quickly... it would have been more believable if their relationship had more time to grow and develop before Alpha came and took Lydia back".

Aaron Neuwirth of We Live Entertainment reviewed the episode "The Storm", stating, "Cassady McClincy has done a lot with a character who could have come off as the worst throughout these past few episodes that have heavily relied on her".

Alex McLevy of The A.V. Club noted that "Alpha’s daughter has been a surprisingly strong presence...and it has everything to do with Cassady McClincy’s performance. She has consistently located the raw-wound heart of the character, making even those groan-inducing moments of teenage romance between Henry and herself maintain a degree of appeal that would otherwise curdle into cloying nonsense".
