= Cassady McClincy Zhang =

American actress

Cassady McClincy
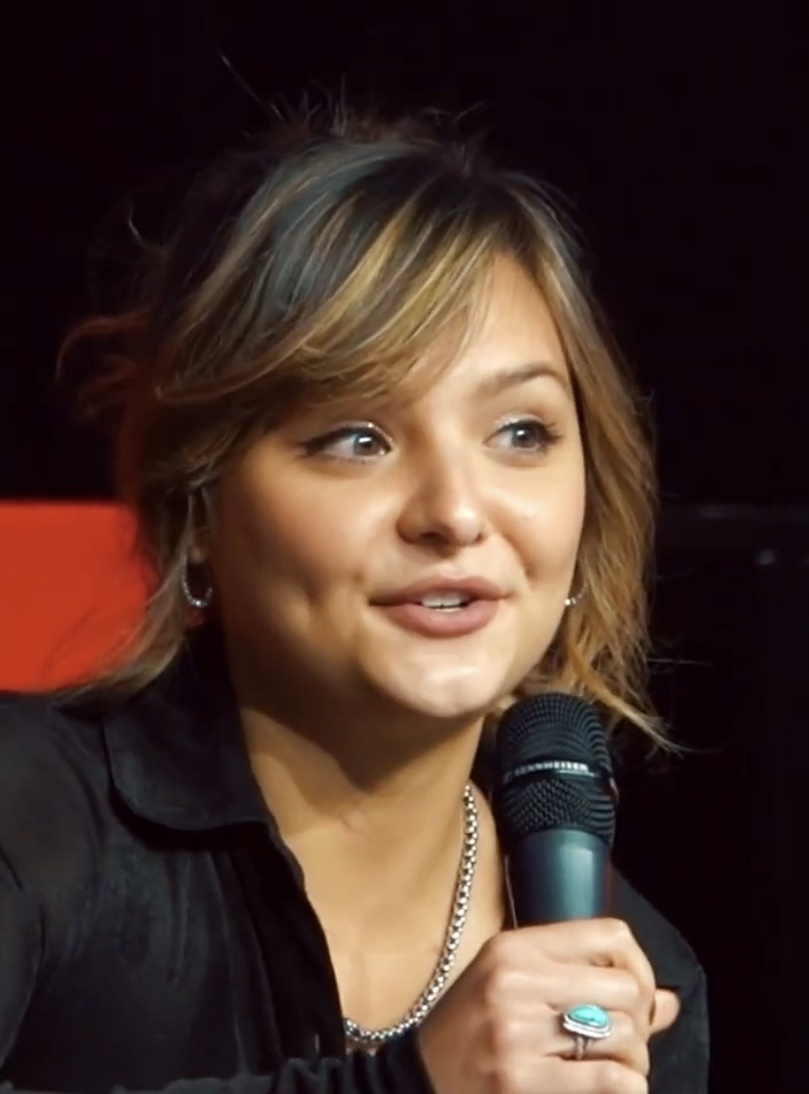
- McClincy at the 2022 German Comic Con Dortmund
- Born: 2000 or 2001 (age 25–26)
- Occupation: Actress
- Years active: 2010–present
- Known for: The Walking Dead (2019–2022)

Cassady McClincy Zhang is an American actress best known for her portrayal of Lydia on the AMC horror-drama television series The Walking Dead from 2019 until 2022 and as Mel Day in the CBS action drama Tracker.

== Life and career ==
McClincy is from Atlanta, Georgia. Her younger sister, Callie, is also an actress.

She started taking dancing and theatre lessons at the age of 7. She started her career as a child actress at the age of 9.

McClincy has guest starred in Lifetime's Drop Dead Diva, NBC's Constantine, TNT's Good Behavior and Amazon Prime Video's original anthology series Lore. In 2017, she made recurring guest star appearances on the Netflix original series Ozark, the Hulu original series Castle Rock and VH1's Daytime Divas. In 2018, she had a role in Love, Simon as Jackie.

At the age of 17, McClincy began to portray Lydia in The Walking Dead during season 9 and became a series regular beginning with season 10.

Following the conclusion of The Walking Dead, McClincy was cast in the independent drama And Out Comes The Wolf, based on the Rancid 1995 album of the same name. Beginning with the film, McClincy changed her stage name to Cassady McClincy Zhang. The film is scheduled to premiere at the 2026 Newport Beach Film Festival. In 2025, McClincy starred as Dani, a high school student pressured into becoming a police informant, in Merlin Camozzi's crime thriller The Snare, which premiered at the Cinequest Film Festival. Randy Myers of The Mercury News called her performance "impressive", and Glenn Kenny of The New York Times wrote that Dani is "played with a mastery of registers by Cassady McClincy Zhang".

In 2025, she was cast in a recurring role as Melanie "Mel" Day on the CBS action drama Tracker alongside Fiona Rene; she was promoted to series regular for the show's fourth season.

McClincy Zhang is also a vocalist. In 2022, she had two shows at a Jazz Club in Alpharetta, Georgia.

== Filmography ==
=== Film ===
Year	Title	Role	Notes
2015	Crimes and Mister Meanors	Kat	
2018	Love, Simon	Jackie	
2018	Poor Jane	Erica	
2025	The Snare	Dani	
2026	And Out Comes The Wolf	Rude Girl Carol	

=== Television ===
Year	Title	Role	Notes
2010	The Wizard of Agni	Munchkin Bobbi	Television film
2010	Five Smooth Stones	Schoolgirl / Soccer Player	Television short
2013	Sid Roth's It's Supernatural	Troubled Teen	Episode: "Karen Wheaton"
2014	Drop Dead Diva	Laura Dwyer	Episode: "Sister Act"
2014	Let the Lion Roar	Mary	Documentary
2015	Constantine	Amberly	Episode: "Waiting for the Man"
2015	Backtrack	Milly Pnewski	Television short
2016	Good Behavior	Ashleigh	Episode: "We Pretend We're Stuck"
2017	Ozark	Anna Sloan	Episode: "Book of Ruth"
2017	Daytime Divas	Tandy Ainsley	Recurring (Season 1)
2017	Lore	Greta Hetfelderz	Episode: "The Beast Within"
2017	The Visitor	Young Angie	Television short
2018	Castle Rock	Young Molly Strand	Recurring (Season 1)
2019–2022	The Walking Dead	Lydia	Recurring (Season 9), also starring (Seasons 10–11), main (Season 11); 33 episodes
2024–2025	Chicago Med	Ariel Sparkman	2 episodes
2025–present	Tracker	Melanie "Mel" Day	Recurring (Season 3); Series Regular (Season 4)
