= The Key (The Walking Dead) =

- The Walking Dead episode
- Episode no.: Season 8 Episode 12
- Directed by: Greg Nicotero
- Written by: Corey Reed; Channing Powell
- Cinematography by: Paul Varrieur
- Editing by: Dan Liu; Tiffany Melvin
- Original air date: March 18, 2018
- Running time: 46 minutes

Guest appearances
- Jayne Atkinson as Georgie; Cooper Andrews as Jerry; Elizabeth Ludlow as Arat; Mike Seal as Gary; Mandi Christine Kerr as Barbara; Kim Ormiston as Hilda; Misty Ormiston as Midge

Episode chronology
| ← Previous "Dead or Alive Or" | Next → "Do Not Send Us Astray" |
- The Walking Dead season 8

"The Key" is the twelfth episode of the eighth season of the post-apocalyptic horror television series The Walking Dead, which aired on AMC on March 18, 2018. It was written by Corey Reed and Channing Powell, and directed by Greg Nicotero.

== Plot ==
At the Sanctuary, Negan organizes the Saviors to cover their weapons in the blood and viscera of the walkers prior to an attack on the Hilltop community. Dwight struggles with hiding his loyalty to Rick and his allies from Negan and his other lieutenants, particularly Simon, as the Saviors start to convoy towards Hilltop.

Meanwhile, Rick and Michonne return to the Hilltop to regroup. Daryl apologizes to Rick for indirectly enabling the Saviors to clear out Sanctuary, resulting in the attacks on the various communities, while Rick admits that his plan of simply waiting for the Saviors' surrender was insufficient. The two decide to continue scouting around Hilltop, leaving Maggie in charge. While waiting, Maggie spots empty crates outside of Hilltop, and on retrieving them, finds a note requesting supplies and vinyl records in exchange for the promise of "the key" to help them. Though Maggie is cautious, she, Michonne, Rosita and Enid decide to comply to see who might be willing to help.

Outside the walls of the Hilltop, Rick spots the Saviors' convoy, and proceeds to chase them down, ramming Negan's car out of the convoy. Rick chases Negan through a desolate town, eventually tipping his car over. Negan flees into an abandoned building; Rick follows him upstairs with walkers following after them, and tries to kill Negan with a hatchet. Negan dives for cover but falls into the building's basement after crashing through some of the rotten wood. Rick follows Negan into the basement, finding his bat "Lucille". As Rick attempts to hunt him down in the dark basement, Negan tries to persuade Rick to surrender by offering to reduce the amount of resources that the Saviors take from the community. Rick rebukes him, refusing to trust him after the Scavengers were wiped out by Saviors; Negan, unaware of Simon's actions, realizes that his orders were disobeyed. To lure Negan out, Rick sets fire to Lucille and uses it to bash a door that he heard walkers behind. The two fight as walkers swarm them; Negan manages to recover Lucille and get away, and Rick escapes soon after but loses track of Negan.

At the planned meeting point, Maggie's group meets Georgie (Jayne Atkinson) with her aides, Hilda (Kim Ormiston) and Midge (Misty Ormiston), who offers them knowledge in exchange for the supplies they were to bring. Maggie decides to hold them at Hilltop until they can figure out what they can do. As Maggie and Michonne discuss what to do, Enid suggests they should just turn Georgie away. Michonne talks her down, and Maggie realizes that the better option would be to fulfill Georgie's wishes. Georgie, in return, offers them some of their food, and a book of plans for constructing rudimentary structures like windmills, hoping that Maggie can turn Hilltop into a thriving community the next time she visits. As Georgie drives off, Enid admits to Michonne she killed the leader of Oceanside, Natania, and is unsure of how she can know what the right thing is to do.

In the midst of events, Simon orders the other Saviors to surround the area while he and Dwight go to find Negan. While looking, Simon talks to Dwight, suggesting that they consider Negan may be dead so they can take control of the Saviors and make the group stronger. They find Negan's upturned car, but instead of searching for Negan, Dwight sets fire to it, and they return to rest of their men. Simon takes control, stating that Negan may be dead, and he now plans to "expunge" the other communities. Elsewhere, Negan wakes up to find that he was taken captive by Jadis, holding him at gunpoint.

== Reception ==
=== Critical reception ===
"The Key" received very positive reviews from critics. On Rotten Tomatoes, it holds an 83% average rating of 7.77 out of 10, based on 24 reviews. The site's consensus reads: ""The Key" injects interesting new characters and action into TWD season 8's ongoing arc of betrayal, though the series sorely needs to break some predictable patterns."

=== Ratings ===
The episode received a total viewership of 6.66 million with a 2.8 rating in adults aged 18–49. This was a slight increase from the previous week, which had 6.60 million viewers.
