= Jerry (The Walking Dead) =

Fictional character

- The Walking Dead character
- Jerry, as portrayed by Cooper Andrews in the television series.
- First appearance: "The Well" (2016)
- Last appearance: "Rest in Peace" (2022)
- Created by: Scott M. Gimple; Matthew Negrete
- Portrayed by: Cooper Andrews

In-universe information
- Occupation: Steward; Bodyguard; Maintenance Worker for the Kingdom; Member of the Militia; Hilltop Council Member
- Spouse: Nabila
- Children: Ezra (son); Aliyah (daughter); Mariam (daughter)

Jerry is a fictional character from AMC's horror drama series The Walking Dead, who first appeared in the seventh season as a recurring character. The character was created for the television series by Scott M. Gimple and is portrayed by Cooper Andrews. Jerry is a former resident of the Kingdom, where he served as King Ezekiel's steward, bodyguard and advisor. After the war against Negan and the Saviors, he married Nabila and several years after Rick Grimes' assumed death, they conceived three children. Much like Daryl Dixon, Simon, and Sasha Williams, Jerry is an original character that does not have a counterpart in the comic book series of the same name.

== Appearances ==
=== Season 7 ===
Jerry first appeared in the episode "The Well" where he was seen in the auditorium with King Ezekiel and Shiva. Jerry also accompanies Ezekiel and the others as they gather feral pigs in the city to give to the Saviors.

In "Rock in the Road", Jerry appeared next to King Ezekiel when he was refusing a deal with Rick Grimes about the rebellion against the Saviors. In "New Best Friends", during an offering for the Saviors, things got tense when Richard and Jared, a hostile Savior, started to argue. Because of this, Jerry and the others aim their weapons towards the Saviors, although nonetheless, the confrontation was stopped by the leaders of both groups. Before returning to their community, the group visited Carol at her new home and Jerry took the time to give her a fruit cake.

In "Bury Me Here", a week after their meeting, the same team ventured to give the Saviors again an offering of twelve melons but before the meeting they had crossed various, strangely put obstacles that prevented their passage to the meeting. When the group arrived to the meeting, the Saviors were surprised that one of the melons were missing in the box. Gavin orders Jared to execute a member of their group as a punishment. Jerry witnessed as Benjamin is shot in the leg by Jared and eventually bleeds to death. Finding the last missing melon, Jerry and the group met again with the Saviors to deliver what was missing. It is revealed that Richard was responsible for the missing melon, and Morgan proceeds to kill him for his actions.

In "The First Day of the Rest of Your Life", Jerry prepares with Carol, Morgan and King Ezekiel to help Rick in the war against the Saviors and save Carl from certain death at the hands of Negan with the help of Shiva along with the Hilltop. The Saviors was forced to retreat back to the Sanctuary.

=== Season 8 ===
In "Mercy", Jerry is among the militia to listen to the speeches of the leaders before attacking the Sanctuary. Jerry goes with Ezekiel to attack an outpost of the Saviors. Seeing a Savior during the lookout at the door, the group started to shoot at him, immediately after however the Savior survived and managed to escape by throwing a grenade at them creating a smokescreen.

In "The Damned", Jerry appears with the Kingdommers when Ezekiel and Carol are fighting walkers in a cloud of smoke. Jerry kills them with his axe, and they manage to find the Savior who escaped from the lookout with the help of Shiva and the Kingdommers successfully accomplished the mission of eliminating much of the next outpost they attacked. In "Monsters", Jerry and his fellow Kingdommers successfully killed the Saviors outside the Gavin's outpost. However, Ezekiel notices that there is a machine gun pointing at the group and orders everyone to run including Jerry.

In "Some Guy", after a great casualty of Kingdommers, Ezekiel is injured and is taken as a hostage by a Savior named Gunther. When he decided to execute him, Jerry appears and halves him with the axe. The two tried to escape from a herd of walkers but they managed to escape with the help of Carol. However, things are not easy having an injured Ezekiel, when the walkers overwhelmed them, Shiva appears and sacrifices herself so that his owner, Carol, and Jerry can escape.

In "The King, the Widow, and Rick" Jerry is seen watching the place where Ezekiel hides, Carol asks her to let her see but Jerry refuses to let her in because Ezekiel doesn't want to talk to anyone, later Carol asks Jerry again to talk to Ezekiel and with a shotgun points to the door and Jerry tells her that it is not necessary because the doors are open. In "How It's Gotta Be", after saving Rick from being killed by the Saviors when inspecting the remains of the Sanctuary, Jerry separates himself from the group back to the Kingdom and helps his friends in a possible battle but on the way he was ambushed and captured by the Simon and his group of Saviors who beat him until he was seriously injured. In addition, after the Saviors intercepted Maggie's and her group's trip to the Sanctuary, clarifying that one of them should be killed as punishment for the attacks they had been made, Gary was about to execute Jerry but Simon ordered him not to do so and instead ended the life of one of Maggie's soldiers. In "Dead or Alive Or", Jerry energetically helped prepare the place for an impending attack by the Saviors and accompanied Maggie to the makeshift prison where all the captive Saviors were to make it clear that they were going to decrease their food ration due to all the people who now took refuge in the community but later she decided with a change of heart that the Saviors will leave for a few minutes a day in pairs and under the close supervision of the guards. In "The Key", Jerry met with Maggie inside the mansion to inform him about the surveillance posts located around the community which were ordered to notify when the Saviors were approaching the place so that everyone is ready to respond to the impending attack. In "Do Not Send Us Astray", Jerry meets the group at the Hilltop and prepared for a Savior attack at the top of the wall with several soldiers, when the Saviors attack the Hilltop, he and the others open fire on them and giving the necessary time for the Saviors to retreat and the next day Jerry helps bury the dead during the Savior assault and survived the walker outbreak caused by contaminated weapons. Later, they realized that Henry has disappeared. In "Still Gotta Mean Something", Jerry is still in the Hilltop guarding with Kal when they see Carol and Henry returns. While Kal and the other guards distract the walkers outside, happy to see that Henry was still alive, Jerry went to announce to King Ezekiel about their arrival, who calmed that Henry had not died as everyone speculated.

In "Wrath", Jerry leaves along with the militia led by Rick to the point where the group and the Saviors will have the final battle, after most of the Saviors were eliminated due to the explosive bullets caused by Eugene, Jerry and the others fight against the Saviors until they give up. Jerry witnessed how Negan was defeated and captured. Rick gives a speech to the group and the Saviors, declaring peace between all the communities. Later, Jerry returns to his home in the Kingdom.

=== Season 9 ===
In "A New Beginning", a year and a half after the end of the war, Jerry and Nabila started a romantic relationship. On the way to Washington D.C., Jerry is seen patrolling and guarding the perimeter of the routes. When Rick and his group arrived at the Sanctuary to deliver the materials the Saviors, they discovered a message on the wall that highlighted that some were still with Negan, Jerry assured Daryl to ignore the person who had done it; and after the visit, he accompanied Ezekiel on his trip to the Kingdom, promising Carol to take care of him during her absence. In "The Bridge", Jerry was one of the people who served in the construction of the bridge that would allow trade between all the communities and temporarily settled in the small camp they had established as a base of operations with his loving interest. When a herd of walkers approached to the construction zone putting everyone's life at risk, Jerry was one of those responsible for activating the alarms to divert the walkers away from the group. In "Warning Signs", Jerry watches the group as the Saviors begin to blame Daryl and Anne for being the murderers of Justin, a member of their group. They grab axes in order for retaliation, but it was stopped by Rick with his gun warning everyone to back off. Later, Jerry is present when Rick and asks his group to look for Arat before the Saviors find out and leave, delaying the construction of the bridge. Jerry asks and tells him what kind of punishment those responsible for the missing Saviors will receive, causing Rick and Maggie to argue. In "The Obliged", Jerry arrives at the camp to alert Rick that Maggie is embarking on a trip to Alexandria, later, when Jed and several Saviors return to demand weapons to retaliate against Oceanside, Jerry leaves his tent with a gun in his hand. However, after Carol caught Jed off guard, more Saviors appear and causes a shooting. In "What Comes After", Jerry was one of the few people who managed to survive the shooting and later along with the rest of his group, witnessed how a wounded Rick blew up the bridge under construction to stop the advance of a large herd of walkers and saw him seemingly die in the explosion.

In "Who Are You Now?", six years later after Rick's assumed death, Jerry married Nabila and conceived 3 children. When the water and light pipes in the Kingdom were getting worse, Jerry got under way to repair them and in the process while talking with Carol, he joked as the queen of the community and the mother of a prince. However, his pleasant talk was interrupted by the sudden explosion of one of the water pipes, and Jerry next to the king and Carol ran to see what had happened and watched with delight as Henry had come forward to repair the damage caused. In "Bounty", following the preparations for the fair, Jerry accompanied Ezekiel and a group of Kingdommers that went out to look for more supplies to offer during the event and went into an abandoned theater to get a light bulb to repair the old movie projector. In the process, Jerry managed to find the piece they needed in company with Dianne but accidentally dropped it into a room infested with walkers and along with his companions they risked fighting the walkers to recover it. In "Chokepoint", when Jerry went for a supply run, he was attacked by a group of plunderers called "The Highwaymen" (similar to the Saviors) demanding the payment of a toll for all those attending the great community fair, Jerry informed his king what had happened and agreed with his plan to eliminate them to maintain the safety of his community. However, Carol decided to put the situation in her hands and managed to converse with their leader Ozzy and his group in a peaceful way and convince them to protect the roads they took with the Kingdom so in return they can be part of the fair and the communities. Having established an agreement with the Highwaymen, Jerry and his group returned to the Kingdom and getting ready for the fair. In "The Calm Before", Jerry attended the fair and after hearing an emotional speech from Ezekiel about reuniting the communities, he began to enjoy the event of the fair in the company of Nabila and his three children. Later, Jerry and his family attended to the community theater for a movie night. After being informed about the victims who were killed at the hands of Alpha, Jerry later listened to Siddiq's speech about not being divided again and that they had to the face the fear of the Whisperers.

In "The Storm", a few months have passed after the massacre during the community fair, a strong winter alerted the inhabitants of the Kingdom and because of the deteriorated status of the Kingdom, the residents were forced to leave their home as Jerry sought the safety of his family and with his people spent a night inside the abandoned Sanctuary and subsequently went on with Michonne's plan to cross the frozen lake as the route is the shortest way to the Hilltop. Despite the risk that the route belonged to the territory of the Whisperers, the Kingdommers managed to arrive safely to the Hilltop Colony.

=== Season 10 ===
In "Lines We Cross", a few months has passed after the harsh winter, Jerry was part of the militia and they trained on the beach of Oceanside for battle in case that the Whisperers will return, but during the winter the Whisperers had mysteriously disappeared from the area. When a satellite crashed to the Whisperers' territory, the crash caused a forest fire enough to destroy the entire Oceanside. Because of the danger, Jerry and the militia crossed the border that divided them from the Whisperers in order to extinguish the fire.

=== Season 11 ===
Now living in a badly damaged Alexandria, Jerry helps to defend the community from walker threats and is dismayed by the state of the Hilltop when a group returns in search of blacksmithing supplies and are forced to put down several reanimated friends. After contact is made with the Commonwealth, Jerry moves there with his family and supports Ezekiel during his treatment for thyroid cancer. Unlike many others, Jerry appears to harbor no lingering resentment for Negan, enthusiastically greeting him when he arrives at the Commonwealth and leading him to Carol. As Negan and Carol deal with the threat of Lance Hornsby, Jerry protects the children from Lance's goons.

After a deal is struck with Governor Pamela Milton, Jerry joins Aaron, Elijah and Lydia on a supply run to Oceanside. After their wagon gets stuck, Jerry injures his leg which, when combined with a nearby herd, forces the group to take shelter for the night at an abandoned renaissance fair. Jerry dubs the location Kingdom 2.0 and suggests it as a possible place to rebuild the Kingdom and Aaron suggests that instead of being under King Ezekiel, this time it can be under King Jerry and Queen Nabila. The herd that the group had encountered earlier attacks, shocking them when one can open doors, leading to a suspicion of surviving Whisperers. However, when the culprit scales the wall to attack Jerry with a rock, it's discovered that it's just a walker. After the herd is dispatched, Aaron notes that he's heard stories of walkers with the ability to climb walls and use tools, but he had never seen one before and thought that they were just stories. As a result, Aaron worries that other variants might also exist.

Shortly thereafter, the group encounters Luke and Jules who reveal that the Commonwealth has taken over Oceanside. With Commonwealth soldiers searching the area, the group covers themselves in walker guts and moves with a nearby herd, only to have the soldiers lead it towards the Commonwealth. However, while trying to hide in an abandoned RV, Luke, Jules and Elijah are separated from the others and Lydia is bitten on the left arm. Jerry is forced to amputate Lydia's arm with his sword and, with Lydia insisting that they need to go and find their friends, Jerry departs into the herd once more to help the others while Aaron and Lydia remain behind. When Aaron and Lydia finally arrive at the Commonwealth, they discover that Luke and Jules are dead and that Jerry and Elijah are still missing, leading to fears that they've perished. That night, as the herd approaches the area where most of the survivors have taken shelter, Jerry and Elijah finally arrive. Jerry frantically searches for his family, but Ezekiel reassures Jerry that they are safe back in Alexandria. Jerry helps to coordinate the destruction of the herd, working with Colonel Vickers and her men to collect the fuel needed for their plan.

After the Commonwealth is saved from the herd and liberated from Pamela Milton's tyranny, Jerry and his family move back to Alexandria. A year later, Jerry and Nabila are walking together when Daryl visits.

== Development and reception ==
Jerry's character entered the recurring cast in the episode "The Well" of the seventh season. However, Andrews was promoted to a series regular starting the tenth season.

Erik Kain of Forbes in the episode "Bounty" praised the development of Cooper Andrews and wrote: "Jerry is wonderful. Cooper Andrews needs to do a movie with Jason Momoa where they're brothers who just chill and crack jokes and drink beer and maybe solve mysteries or save the world or something. I'd watch that movie."

Writer for Comicbook Brandon Davis also praised Jerry's development and said: "Jerry, played by Cooper Andrews, brought a layer of humor to the AMC series which fan have been unfamiliar with. After all, this is a show which earned its popularity on the mantra of, 'No one is safe.'"

Nat Berman of TV Overmind also praised the character played by Andrews and wrote: "If you are a fan of The Walking Dead, then you know that Cooper Andrews' character, Jerry, is a faithful steward to (the former) King Ezekiel, played by Khary Payton. The character played by Andrews brings a much-needed air of comic relief to a show that can be downright terrifying at times."

Dustin Rowles of Uproxx praised Andrews and wrote: "The actor who plays The Walking Dead's new best character is Cooper Andrews, and if he looks familiar, it's probably because you've seen Halt and Catch Fire, where he plays the similarly delightful Yo-Yo Engberk."
