= The First Day of the Rest of Your Life =

The First Day of the Rest of Your Life may refer to:

- The First Day of the Rest of Your Life (film), a 2008 French comedy-drama film
- "The First Day of the Rest of Your Life!" (Pokémon the Series), a 2016 episode of the nineteenth season of the Pokémon anime series, Pokémon the Series: XYZ
- "The First Day of the Rest of Your Life" (The Walking Dead), a 2017 episode of the television series The Walking Dead
