= How It's Gotta Be =

- The Walking Dead episode
- Episode no.: Season 8 Episode 8
- Directed by: Michael E. Satrazemis
- Written by: David Leslie Johnson; Angela Kang
- Cinematography by: Paul Varrieur
- Editing by: Evan Schrodek
- Original air date: December 10, 2017
- Running time: 65 minutes

Guest appearances
- Callan McAuliffe as Alden; Deborah May as Natania; Jayson Warner Smith as Gavin; Cooper Andrews as Jerry; Sydney Park as Cyndie; Jason Douglas as Tobin; Kenric Green as Scott; Avi Nash as Siddiq; Thomas Francis Murphy as Brion; Sabrina Gennarino as Tamiel; Kerry Cahill as Dianne; Lindsley Register as Laura; R. Keith Harris as Dr. Harlan Carson; Joshua Mikel as Jared; Briana Venskus as Beatrice; Nicole Barré as Kathy; James Chen as Kal; Peter Zimmerman as Eduardo; Mike Seal as Gary; Nadine Marissa as Nabila; Adam Fristoe as Dean; Mandi Christine Kerr as Barbara; Ted Huckabee as Bruce; Aaron Farb as Norris; Matt Mangum as D.J.; Alan Heckner as Savior; Karl Funk as Neil

Episode chronology
← Previous "Time for After"	Next → "Honor"
- The Walking Dead season 8

"How It's Gotta Be" is the eighth episode and mid-season finale of the eighth season of the post-apocalyptic horror television series The Walking Dead, which aired on AMC on December 10, 2017. The episode was written by David Leslie Johnson and Angela Kang, and directed by Michael E. Satrazemis.

This episode focuses on the ongoing war between the Saviors and the combined forces of Alexandria, the Hilltop, and the Kingdom escalates, continuing the "All Out War" arc from the comic book series of the same name. Free from the Sanctuary, the Saviors launch multiple attacks to gain an edge in the war. At the Kingdom, Gavin (Jayson Warner Smith) and his group declare everything the community produces to be theirs. On the road, Simon (Steven Ogg) overtakes Maggie's (Lauren Cohan) convoy. At Alexandria, Negan (Jeffrey Dean Morgan) and his soldiers attack with grenades and explosives.

The episode received mixed reviews from critics.

== Plot ==
In the wake of Daryl and Tara's attack on the Sanctuary that unintentionally allowed the Saviors to escape, Savior lookouts open fire on Rick, Jadis, and the Scavengers; Rick is abandoned. Suddenly, Rick is rescued by Carol and Jerry; the three decide to split up to warn the allied communities. With the Sanctuary now back under their full control, Negan and the Saviors launch a counterattack against the Militia. At Alexandria, Carl sits alone in a room in contemplation and writes a letter to his father.

Elsewhere, Aaron and Enid decide to try to make up with the Oceanside community, whose guns they took to fight the Saviors, by bringing them a truck full of alcohol from a nearby brewery. Waiting outside the community at night, Aaron is attacked, but Enid shoots his attacker, which turns out to be Natania, the leader of Oceanside. The two are then surrounded by other Oceanside members; Cyndie mourns her grandmother.

Back at Alexandria, Carl prepares to deliver more food to Siddiq, but is unexpectedly interrupted by Negan, who orders the community to surrender over a loudspeaker outside the walls. Prepared to torch Alexandria to the ground, Negan is interrupted by Carl, who appears over Alexandria's walls. Carl tries to talk sense into Negan, offering and willing to give up his life. However, this is a distraction to allow all of the Alexandria residents escape into the sewers. Acting as decoys, Daryl, Michonne, Tara, and Rosita drive and smash trucks in the walls at the back of the safe-zone and through a roadblock of Savior vehicles, purposely arranged ineffectively by Dwight; a chase ensues.

Meanwhile, Maggie, Jesus, and a large convoy of Hilltop residents head presumably toward the Sanctuary to meet up with the Alexandrians in the hopes that the Saviors will surrender. However, a group of Saviors overtake the convoy, revealing that they have captured Jerry en route to the Hilltop; Simon appears and approaches Maggie's car. Simon then orders Maggie to give up her convoy's firearms to the Saviors or else Jerry and everyone else will be shot; Maggie agrees. Before the convoy can head back to the Hilltop, Simon shoots and kills one of the people inside Maggie's car as punishment. Upon returning to the Hilltop, Maggie executes one of the Savior prisoners—Dean—in retribution and orders the Hilltop to be fortified.

At the Kingdom, Gavin and a force of well over a dozen Saviors have gathered up the citizens for an announcement. Gavin proclaims that the Kingdom and whatever they produce are now property of the Saviors, all able-bodied residents will be taken to the Sanctuary to see to its repair and refurbishment, and announces that his men will make the Kingdom their home due to the destruction of their former residence. Ezekiel, who had sneaked away, creates a distraction that allows the residents to escape into the nearby woods.

Infuriated by Carl's ruse, Negan orders his men to launch grenades into Alexandria; several buildings and houses are razed. Negan's troops smash their way through the front gate and pour into the community while Carl provides cover through smoke bombs before he escapes to the sewers. Concurrently, the pursuing Savior group is led into an ambush set by Daryl's convoy; Dwight begins to kill several Saviors. However, Laura, a high-ranking Savior, catches Dwight in the act of betrayal and shoots him in the arm, and then escapes. In the aftermath of the firefight, Dwight joins Daryl and company, who then descend into the sewers as Alexandria burns; Michonne remains above ground; at the sanctuary, Eugene helps the ill Gabriel and Dr. Harlan Carson escape to the Hilltop Colony, though Eugene fears Gabriel may not make it; at the Kingdom, Carol encounters the residents and finds Ezekiel, who locks himself in the Kingdom to face the Saviors alone, with Morgan observing this from a distance.

Amidst the bombardment, Rick eventually arrives and sees the town in flames; he rushes to his house to look for Michonne, Carl and Judith, only to find Negan awaiting his arrival. The two brawl, but Rick, severely injured, manages to escape and meets with Michonne; the couple descend into the sewers. Joining the surviving Alexandrians, they find Carl looking sweaty and tired; Carl lifts his shirt, showing them a walker bite on his abdomen. Devastated and stunned, Rick and Michonne comfort Carl as they take in the horror of what must come next.

== Development ==
"How It's Gotta Be" features the revelation that the character of Carl Grimes was apparently bitten by a walker in the sixth episode, "The King, the Widow, and Rick". Showrunner Scott M. Gimple explained that Carl's bite is "a one-way ticket". He alluded to the show's next episode, following the mid-season break, that the bite is "very important to Carl's story and the entire story what happens in the next episode". Carl's pending death deviates significantly from the comic book series, as, at the time of airing, both Carl and Rick were still alive in the comic's published arc, with Carl having a critical role in the Whisperers arc that follows the "All Out War" narrative. Some have said that Carl's pending death is the largest deviation that the television series has made from the comics to date. Chandler Riggs, who portrays Carl, explained that the decision to kill Carl off was not due his own personal life (at the time, he was taking a year off before entering college) but a choice made by the showrunners to account for a gap in the comic's story. In the comic's "All Out War" story arc, the war ends with Rick slashing Negan's throat, but then time jumps two years forward to show that Rick had kept Negan alive, although in prison. Riggs said that Gimple felt they needed to make Carl appear as a humanitarian figure in death as to give something for Rick to aspire towards, as to overcome this characterization gap in the comics. Riggs himself only learned of the character's death during the filming of the sixth episode of the season.

== Reception ==
=== Critical reception ===
"How It's Gotta Be" received mixed reviews from critics. On Rotten Tomatoes, it holds a 64% with an average rating of 6.07 out of 10, based on 28 reviews. The site's consensus reads: "Few surprises and far too many dumb decisions -- is this really 'How It's Gotta Be?'"

Zack Handlen of The A.V. Club wrote: "Despite all the big events, so much of 'How It's Gotta Be' is boring, and so little of it makes sense." Writing for IGN, Matt Fowler wrote that the episode "distinguished itself from its Season 8 predecessors by having real weight, real consequences, and a certain sense of closure (thanks to the fatal wounding of one of the show's founding characters) - so in that regard it sort of towers over the other chapters a bit. Still, nothing came to a complete close here". Fowler also felt that the episode had problems with pacing and staging, and called the structure of the first half of the season "woefully unsatisfying". While he felt that Carl's revealed fate was predictable, the reveal made up for it, calling it a "really effective moment".

Writing for Den of Geek, John Saavedra gave the episode 3 out of 5 stars, commenting that the episode "really feels like the first half of a two-part story" and that it "effectively ties up all of the different storylines from the first half". Saavedra also believed that Carl's death was genuinely shocking, having criticized the show in his review for "The King, the Widow, and Rick" for playing it safe and putting main characters into situations that the audience knows they'll survive. Jeff Stone of IndieWire gave the episode a C−, writing: "Since it's the mid-season finale, basically every named character gets at least one line of dialogue, but the biggest focus is poor ol' optimistic Carl, who grew a pesky conscience between seasons."

=== Ratings ===
The mid-season finale drew a total viewership of 7.89 million with a 3.4 Nielson rating in adults aged 18–49. It marked an increase in viewership from the previous week, but compared to previous seasons, it was the lowest viewership for a mid-season finale since the season two episode "Pretty Much Dead Already", which drew a total audience of 6.62 million viewers.
