= The Well (The Walking Dead) =

- The Walking Dead episode
- King Ezekiel and Shiva make their debut.
- Episode no.: Season 7 Episode 2
- Directed by: Greg Nicotero
- Written by: Matthew Negrete
- Cinematography by: Michael E. Satrazemis
- Editing by: Rachel Goodlett Katz
- Original air date: October 30, 2016
- Running time: 47 minutes

Guest appearances
- Khary Payton as King Ezekiel; Logan Miller as Benjamin; Karl Makinen as Richard; Daniel Newman as Daniel; Cooper Andrews as Jerry; Kerry Cahill as Dianne; Joshua Mikel as Jared; Jayson Warner Smith as Gavin; Jason Burkey as Kevin; Macsen Lintz as Henry; Carlos Navarro as Alvaro; Jule Culotta as Kingdom Choir; Jelani Watkins as Kingdom Choir; Stephen Pepper as Kingdom Choir; Erin Barksdale as Kingdom Choir; Madalyn Hardwick as Kingdom Choir; Devon Higgins as Kingdom Choir; Taylor Conley as Kingdom Choir; Will Nichols as Kingdom Choir

Episode chronology
← Previous "The Day Will Come When You Won't Be"	Next → "The Cell"
- The Walking Dead season 7

"The Well" is the second episode of the seventh season of the post-apocalyptic horror television series The Walking Dead, which aired on AMC on October 30, 2016. The episode was written by Matthew Negrete and directed by Greg Nicotero.

The episode focuses on Carol (Melissa McBride) and Morgan (Lennie James) finding refuge and being introduced to a new well-established community called the Kingdom. It marks the first appearances of King Ezekiel (Khary Payton), his pet Bengal tiger named Shiva, and his right-hand man Jerry (Cooper Andrews).

== Plot ==
Carol regains consciousness in the bed of a horse-drawn wagon. Her wounds are fresh; it's only been a couple hours since she was shot repeatedly by a Savior and rescued by Morgan. The men on horseback, who previously offered to get Carol medical assistance, lead the way to their survivor community: The Kingdom. Morgan walks alongside the wagon and Carol falls back asleep. However, en route, Carol experiences visions of a decrepit female walker that is inside an abandoned house outside the community.

Two days later, Carol is fully conscious, though still weak, and is taken by Morgan to meet King Ezekiel (Khary Payton), the leader of the Kingdom, and his pet Bengal tiger, Shiva. Carol is taken aback by Ezekiel's over-the-top manner, but feigns approval of his hospitality and politely rejects his offer of fruit, stating that pomegranates are not to her liking. Later, Carol confides in Morgan that she is going to leave at the first opportunity.

As Carol recovers, Morgan is invited by Ezekiel on a secret mission with a small group to collect eight wild pigs, let them feed on walkers, and slaughter them as their current offering to the Saviors. At the arranged meeting, there is open hostility between the Saviors and Kingdom, but the Saviors accept the pigs and demand produce for their next offering or threaten to kill one of the Kingdom's men. Ezekiel, impressed with Morgan's performance in this mission, asks him to train one of his men, Benjamin (Logan Miller), in staff combat skills. While training, Benjamin reveals that Ezekiel continues to meet the Saviors' demands as he does not believe the Kingdom can beat them.

Some time later, Carol attempts to collect some provisions from the Kingdom's stores before she leaves, but Ezekiel catches her. He tells her he knew she was feigning her approval but is curious about her strong survival abilities. Carol explains some of her past, leading Ezekiel to reveal his own "King" is an act; he was a former zookeeper and amateur actor, but took on the King persona to give his people someone to follow and know there is good in the world. Carol still wishes to leave and Ezekiel suggests that she can stay nearby in the abandoned house, so that she could "go and not go." Subsequently, Morgan escorts Carol to the house. There, she clears it of the walker she had spotted earlier. Later, Carol gets a visit from Ezekiel and Shiva. He offers her a pomegranate, telling her how good they are; she smiles.

== Production ==
Beginning with this episode, Steven Yeun and Michael Cudlitz are removed from the opening credits, while Alanna Masterson, Josh McDermitt and Christian Serratos are added, having joined the series in the fourth season.

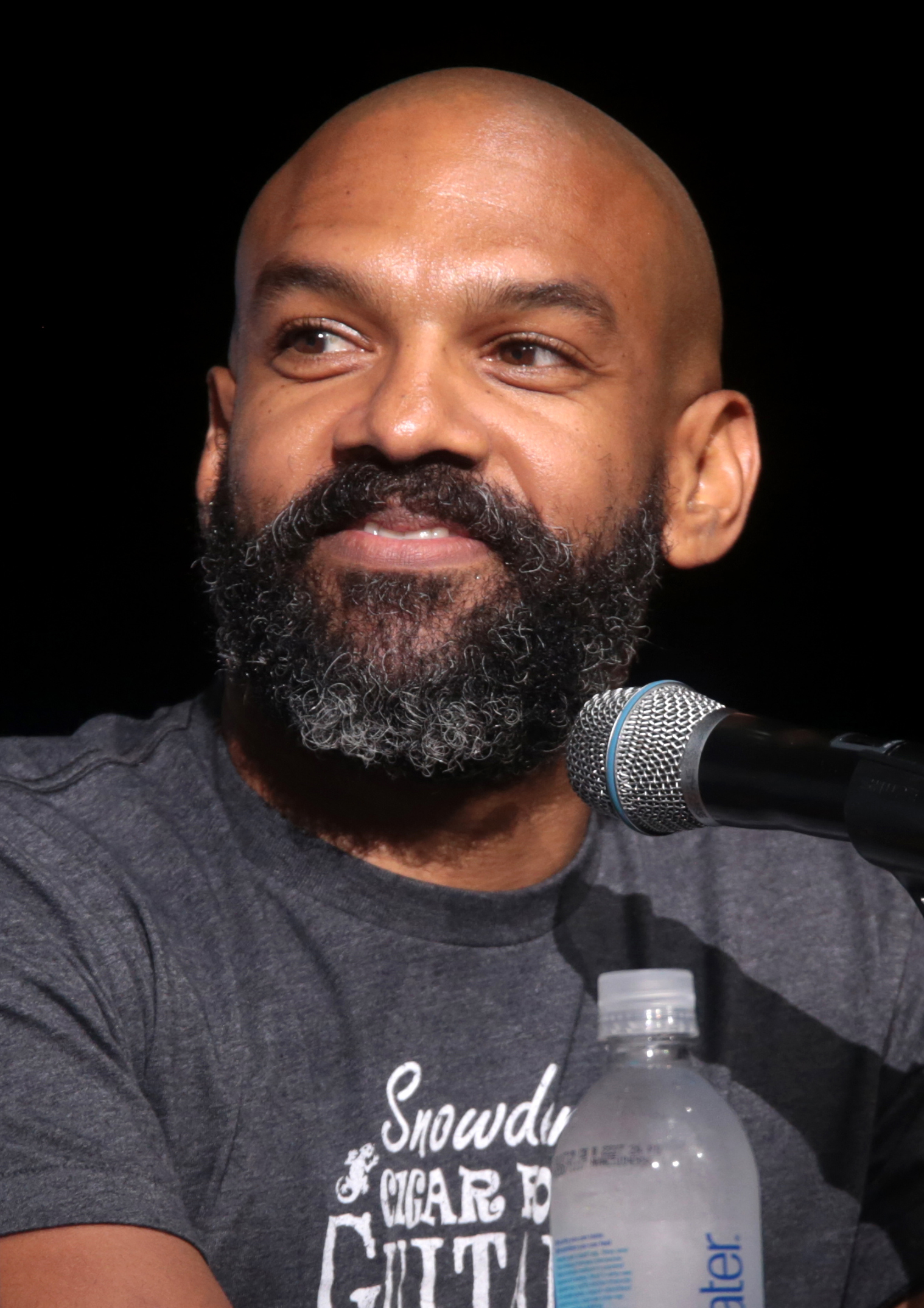
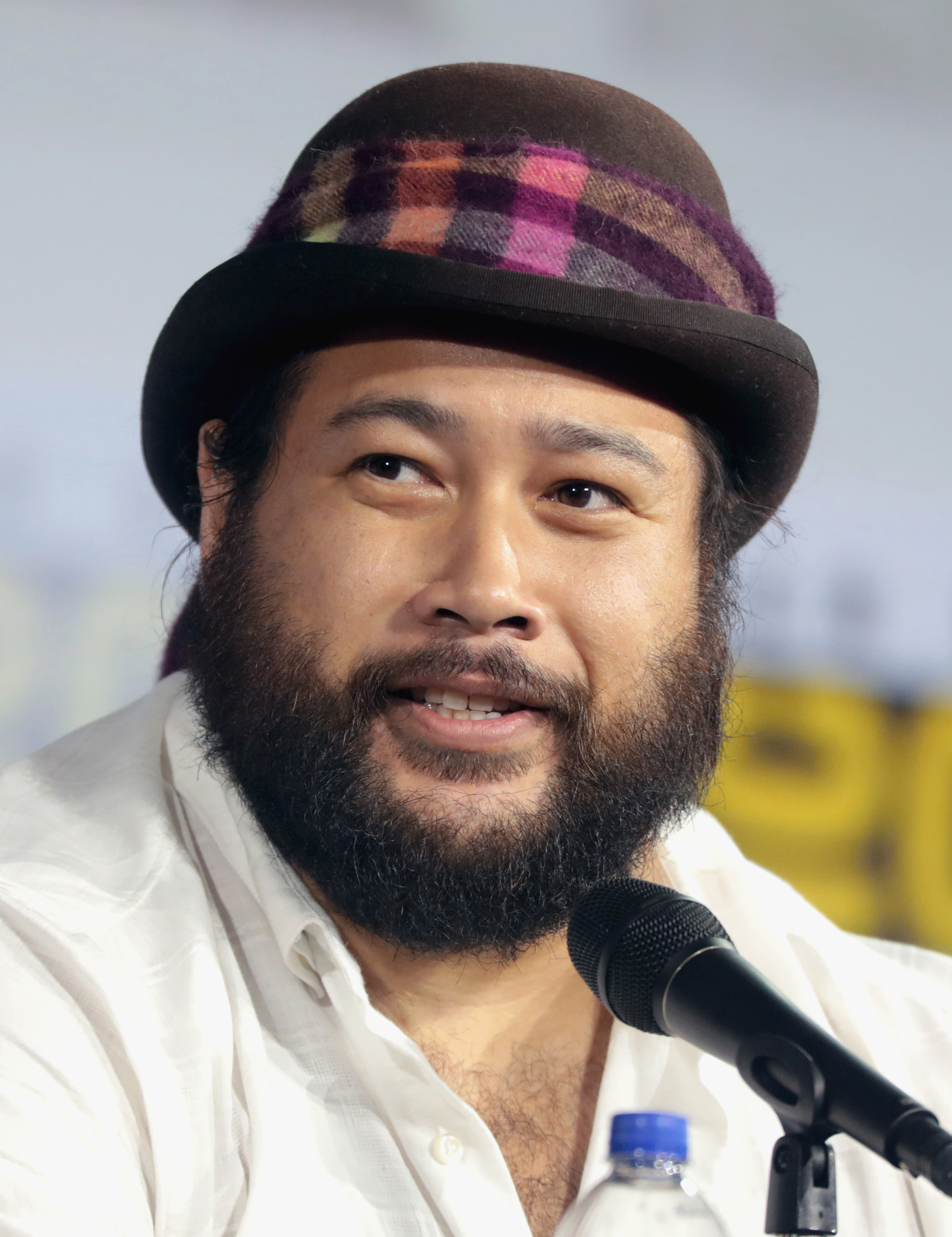
This episode marks the debut of Khary Payton as King Ezekiel and Cooper Andrews as Jerry

== Reception ==
=== Critical reception ===
"The Well" received critical acclaim. It is also the best reviewed episode of the season on Rotten Tomatoes. On the aforementioned website, it holds a 95% with an average rating of 7.85 out of 10, based on 41 reviews. The site's consensus reads: "The Well" brings a welcome reprieve from the brutality of the season premiere, introducing a colorful new character and focusing on two of The Walking Dead's most fascinating regulars.

=== Ratings ===
The episode received a 6.1 rating in the key 18-49 demographic with 12.46 million total viewers.
