= Time for After =

- The Walking Dead episode
- Episode no.: Season 8 Episode 7
- Directed by: Larry Teng
- Written by: Matthew Negrete; Corey Reed
- Cinematography by: Duane Manwiller
- Editing by: Alan Cody
- Original air date: December 3, 2017
- Running time: 44 minutes

Guest appearances
- Thomas Francis Murphy as Brion; Sabrina Gennarino as Tamiel; R. Keith Harris as Dr. Harlan Carson; Lindsley Register as Laura; Chloe Aktas as Tanya; Griffin Freeman as Mark; Traci Dinwiddie as Regina; Sonequa Martin-Green as Sasha Williams (archive footage)

Episode chronology
← Previous "The King, the Widow, and Rick"	Next → "How It's Gotta Be"
- The Walking Dead season 8

"Time for After" is the seventh episode of the eighth season of the post-apocalyptic horror television series The Walking Dead, which aired on AMC on December 3, 2017. The episode was written by Matthew Negrete and Corey Reed, and directed by Larry Teng.

== Plot ==
Rick attempts to negotiate his release with Jadis of the Scavengers, but she refuses again and takes photographs of Rick's half-naked body at different angles, intending to use the photos as references for a sculpture she plans to create of him.

Inside the Sanctuary, Eugene, who is aware that Dwight is the mole within Negan's ranks that allowed Rick's plan to work, struggles with what action to take. Gabriel, who has been taken prisoner by Negan and held in the infirmary, tries to convince Eugene to do the right thing to help the combined Alexandria, Hilltop, and Kingdom communities.

Outside the Sanctuary, Daryl, Tara, Michonne, and Rosita plot to take a garbage truck and ram it through the walls of the compound, thus allowing the walkers presently surrounding the building to flood in and attack the Saviors. As they discuss matters, Morgan arrives, having overheard their discussion, and offers his support and that of his group of snipers that are monitoring the Sanctuary under Rick's orders. Rosita starts to become concerned about going against Rick's plan and leaves, while Michonne is still unsure if this is the right action, knowing that the situation, as it is, is working to keep the Saviors confined.

Later, Negan summons Eugene and questions him on the progress he has made to figure out how to rid the walkers around the Sanctuary, and will become second-in-charge should he do so. Eugene comes up with an idea for creating a glider drone with a speaker to lure the walkers away; however, he is forced to locate the coffin that Negan used to take Sasha to Alexandria and find the iPod he had given her before she committed suicide en route, forcing him to relive that memory. With the glider ready to launch, Dwight holds Eugene at gunpoint on the roof, reminding him that Negan will go after Rick and his friends if he goes through with this. Eugene decides to launch anyway, but Dwight shoots the drone down before it can attract the walkers. Just then, Daryl drives the truck into the Sanctuary walls, allowing the walkers to flood the lower floors of the Sanctuary. Many of the workers are killed, but Negan's lieutenants lead an assault to keep the walkers at bay. Eugene, enraged by events, tells Gabriel that he will do what keeps him alive and will remain loyal to Negan. He then goes to see Negan, preparing to inform him that Dwight is the mole, but Dwight and Regina suddenly arrive, causing Eugene to stop short of revealing Dwight's betrayal. He then returns to his room and, amid the constant sound of gunfire, starts to get drunk on wine to try to drown out the noise. Eugene eventually offers Negan an audacious plan to free themselves from the Sanctuary that will take a lot of bullets.

Rick is brought out from the storage container and led to the center of the junkyard by a Scavenger. He is then forced to his knees, before Jadis presents a lightly armored walker as a method of execution. Able to get the upper hand, Rick threatens Jadis to let him go or die; she lets him go. Rick then makes a deal to allow the Scavengers to share in the spoils from the Saviors if they join him, but Jadis demands to see the situation at the Sanctuary itself before she or her people commit to Rick's plan. The Scavengers are then led by Rick to the outer perimeter of the compound. Walking in, Rick finds one of his snipers dead, being devoured by a small group of walkers. Unable to contact the other snipers, Rick climbs the water tower and observes the area from higher ground. Looking towards the front of the Sanctuary, Rick looks on aghast at the Sanctuary yard, completely devoid of walkers, only to see an abandoned garbage truck and an open door with a giant hole in the compound's wall, alarming him.

== Production ==
This episode was supposed to feature a scene where Dwight killed fellow Savior Mark by throwing him off of a balcony to his death. However, actor Griffin Freeman's stuntman, John Bernecker, died shooting the scene and it was thus never shown.

== Reception ==
=== Critical reception ===
"Time for After" received generally positive reviews from critics. On Rotten Tomatoes, it holds a 76% with an average rating of 6.25 out of 10, based on 21 reviews. The site's consensus reads: "Time for After" improves on TWD's previous episode by focusing on Eugene's emotional struggle. Many critics noted Josh McDermitt's emotional performance, as well as the change of pace from the previous episode, as the episode's highlights.

Zack Handlen of The A.V. Club graded the episode a B− and said: "Rick had a plan; that plan isn't working. We get to see things start to shift before he does, and the final shot of him realizing just how much trouble he's in works, ending the hour on a strong note."

Steve Ford of TV Fanatic gave the episode a 4 out of 5 stars, saying ""Time for After" put more focus toward a smaller variety of characters. It allowed more time for their stories to build and play out more naturally without feeling rushed. As a result, the episode was all the better for it."

=== Ratings ===
The episode averaged a 3.3 rating among adults 18-49, and had a viewership of 7.47 million viewers, which marked a decrease in viewership from the previous week.
