= New Best Friends (The Walking Dead) =

- The Walking Dead episode
- Rick fights off an armored walker named Winslow after being thrown into a trash pit by Jadis
- Episode no.: Season 7 Episode 10
- Directed by: Jeffrey F. January
- Written by: Channing Powell
- Cinematography by: Michael E. Satrazemis
- Editing by: Dan Liu
- Original air date: February 19, 2017
- Running time: 52 minutes

Guest appearances
- Khary Payton as King Ezekiel; Karl Makinen as Richard; Logan Miller as Benjamin; Pollyanna McIntosh as Jadis; Thomas Francis Murphy as Brion; Cooper Andrews as Jerry; Daniel Newman as Daniel; Carlos Navarro as Alvaro; Kerry Cahill as Dianne; Jayson Warner Smith as Gavin; Joshua Mikel as Jared; Sabrina Gennarino as Tamiel

Episode chronology
| ← Previous "Rock in the Road" | Next → "Hostiles and Calamities" |
- The Walking Dead season 7

"New Best Friends" is the tenth episode of the seventh season of the post-apocalyptic horror television series The Walking Dead, which aired on AMC on February 19, 2017. The episode was written by Channing Powell and directed by Jeffrey F. January.

The episode focuses on Rick (Andrew Lincoln) and his group's encounter and discovery of a mysterious collective, while searching for a missing Alexandrian; its inhabitants are unlike any they have come across. It also features the reunion of Daryl and Carol.

== Plot ==
King Ezekiel, Morgan, and several other members of the Kingdom, including Richard, meet the Saviors for their weekly supply drop. During this, Savior Jared gets confrontational with Richard, and demands his gun; Richard refuses until Ezekiel orders him to do so. Richard hands it over with an insult to Jared, causing Jared to lunge at him but Morgan uses his wooden staff to stop it. For the infraction, the Saviors take Morgan's staff when they leave and warn them to avoid these types of incidents in the future.

Back at the Kingdom, Richard hands Daryl a new crossbow and explains that they share the same goal: killing the Saviors. Daryl is asked by Richard to help him defeat the Saviors; Daryl agrees. Richard leads Daryl to a hiding spot on a highway that he knows the Saviors use. He wants to attack the Saviors when they pass, so that when other Saviors discover the scene, they will follow a trail to a weapons cache he planted at the cottage occupied by Carol. Richard anticipates that if the Saviors kill Carol, Ezekiel, who respected her, will be incited enough to declare war. Daryl, learning that Carol is at risk, refuses to do anything with this plan in which the two men get into a fight that leads him to beat up Richard, then vows to harm him if Carol is hurt in any way, and leaves on his own.

Elsewhere, Rick and his group are escorted into a giant junkyard by the Scavengers, a group of strange-acting survivors. Their leader, Jadis (Pollyanna McIntosh), tells the group that the Scavengers now "own" them and they must "buy" themselves back. Rick attempts to plead for them to help support his fight against the Saviors, but Jadis seems unimpressed. Gabriel appears, having been kidnapped by the Scavengers the previous day, and holds one of them hostage, trying to convince Jadis that should they beat the Saviors, they can have some of the spoils. Jadis is intrigued and she takes Rick to a high pile of trash. She explains she is still not sure of the deal, and pushes Rick into an enclosed trash pit, where a walker named Winslow is covered in spikes and wearing a metal helmet, lunges for him. Rick is able to use the trash to defeat the walker, proving his mettle to Jadis. Jadis tells Rick they had been watching the boat that he and Aaron had taken supplies from, looking for someone with the capability of reaching it. Jadis agrees to offer the Scavengers' help if they are rewarded with "a lot" of guns, a third of the Saviors' stores, and a portion of the Alexandria supplies, to which Rick agrees. As the Scavengers disperse and Rick's group is allowed to leave, Gabriel thanks Rick for rescuing him and believing he did not steal the supplies. When asked why he smiled, he reminds Gabriel that "enemies can become friends". As they leave, Rick takes a cat statue out of a junk pile to replace the one Michonne lost and claiming that his group won.

At Carol's house, she greets Ezekiel and accepts his gift of cobbler. After Ezekiel leaves, Carol is surprised by another guest: Daryl. The two hug, and Carol tells Daryl that she left Alexandria as she didn't want to lose anyone else. Daryl catches her up on events in Alexandria, though lies about the deaths of Glenn and Abraham. Daryl returns to the Kingdom, and while befriending Ezekiel's bengal tiger, Shiva, he asks Morgan to help convince Ezekiel to join the cause against the Saviors. Morgan refuses to do so. The next day, Daryl sets out to return to Hilltop to help prepare there.

== Reception ==
=== Critical reception ===
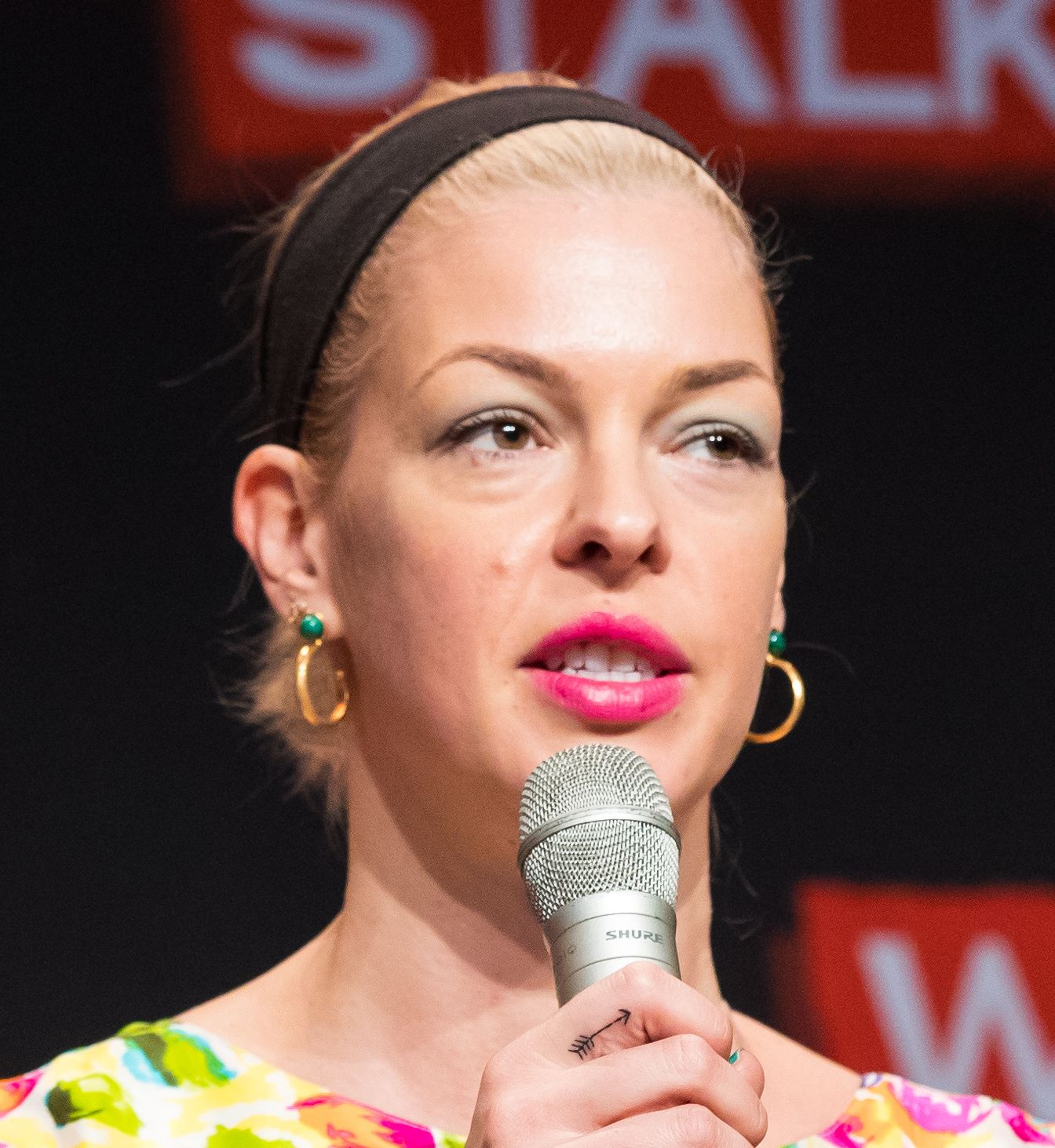
Pollyanna McIntosh made her first appearance as Jadis in this episode.

"New Best Friends" received positive reviews from critics. On Rotten Tomatoes, it holds an 84% with an average rating of 7.38 out of 10, based on 31 reviews. The site's consensus reads: "New Best Friends" balances absurdity and dramatic tension as it introduces a bizarrely entertaining new community, even if some moments feel forced and contrived.

=== Ratings ===
The episode received a 5.3 rating in the key 18-49 demographic with 11.08 million total viewers.
