= Gabriel Stokes (The Walking Dead) =

Fr. Gabriel Stokes
- The Walking Dead character
- Gabriel Stokes, as he appears in the comic book series (left) and as portrayed by Seth Gilliam in the television series (right).
- First appearance: Comic: "Issue #61" (2009); Television: "Strangers" (2014; The Walking Dead)
- Last appearance: Comic: "Issue #158" (2016); Television: "Become" (2024; The Ones Who Live)
- Created by: Robert Kirkman; Charlie Adlard
- Adapted by: Scott M. Gimple (The Walking Dead)
- Portrayed by: Seth Gilliam

In-universe information
- Occupation: Episcopal priest Member of the Militia; Television: Look-out for the Alexandria Safe-Zone; Head of the Alexandria Council
- Significant others: Television: Anne; Rosita Espinosa
- Children: Television: Socorro Espinosa (adopted daughter)

Father Gabriel Stokes is a fictional character from the comic book series The Walking Dead and is portrayed by Seth Gilliam in the television series of the same name. He is an Episcopal priest from Georgia who isolated himself from the outside world at the beginning of the outbreak, after shutting out the members of his congregation, causing their deaths. He is struggling to come to terms with the new reality he faces and his own faith.

== Appearances ==
=== Character biography ===
Since the start of the apocalypse, Gabriel had barricaded himself in his parish, St. Sarah's Episcopal Church. He had been hiding within the church walls from the undead and surviving off of canned goods from the parish food pantry. It is revealed that he is a widower and that he likely lost his wife to the zombie plague. He has survived over several months alone in the church by turning away his followers and any other civilians when the zombie attacks started, saving him from internal conflict. As a consequential result, however, he now feels extreme remorse.

=== Comic book series ===
Gabriel is first encountered by the group after they had escaped from Terminus, with Rick and the group skeptical of Gabriel and his story. He brings Rick and company to his church, where they stay, with Gabriel being able to effortlessly blend into the group, due to Rick and the group dealing with Ben killing Billy. Gabriel allows them to stay at the church as they search for Dale, who went missing. He is killed by Beta during the war against the Whisperers in issue 158

=== Television series ===
==== Season 5 ====
Gabriel first appears in the season 5 episode "Strangers". He is heard screaming for help, and when Rick's group arrives, they find him trapped on top of a boulder with three walkers surrounding him. They quickly kill the walkers and Gabriel comes down, thanking them after vomiting. After being searched and answering Rick's questions, he tells them that he has a church nearby, and he leads them back to it. He insists that he is alone, and has been ever since the outbreak started, surviving off food from the nearest town. When he tells them that he hasn't searched the local food bank, due to it being overrun, he is forced on a supply run to the food bank with Rick, Michonne, Bob, and Sasha. During the run, he panics when he recognizes one of the walkers in the flooded basement, and is nearly killed before Rick saves him. Rick makes it immediately clear that he does not trust Gabriel, although Carl believes that Rick is being too tough on the priest. Rick's suspicions increase when Gabriel admits to having "sinned" in the past, and Carl discovers scratch marks on the outside of the church's walls, along with the phrase "You'll burn for this" scratched into the wood. In the episode "Four Walls and a Roof", when Sasha accuses Gabriel of being behind the disappearances of Bob, Carol, and Daryl, Rick grabs Gabriel and demands that he confess what he did. Breaking down sobbing, Gabriel reveals that in the immediate aftermath of the outbreak, he locked his church's doors and windows and refused to let anyone in, even members of his own congregation as they were torn apart by the walkers. He buried their bones outside the church grounds, but nonetheless believes that he is damned to hell for what he did and begs Rick to kill him if he is. Gabriel is clearly appalled at the group's use of violence when they slaughter all six of the Terminus survivors inside his church. In the episode "Crossed", despite his distaste of the use of weapons, Carl convinces Gabriel to choose a weapon that Carl will teach him how to use. After some reluctance, he chooses a machete. However, it is revealed that he is actually using the machete to pry open the floorboards of his office so that he can escape using a crawlspace beneath the church. In the mid-season finale "Coda", Gabriel heads to the elementary school where the late Bob said he was taken by the Hunters when they ate his leg. After finding the Hunters' camp, including Bob's burned leg and Mary's Bible, he is thoroughly horrified at what the world around him has become. At that moment, the herd of walkers that was trapped inside the school finally breaks through the glass doors and begins pursuing him. He runs back to the church, only to lead the walker horde right back to the church as well, thus rendering the church no longer safe when the walkers break through the door. However, Abraham and his group return blocking the walkers off by smashing the entrance with a firetruck. Gabriel is seen among Abraham's group when they arrive in Atlanta, in time to see Daryl carrying Beth's lifeless body.

In the mid-season premiere "What Happened and What's Going On", Gabriel is seen reading a passage of the bible during Tyreese's funeral. In the episode "Them", Gabriel is seen talking to a depressed Maggie and telling her that he understands her pain and he is there if she ever wants to talk about Hershel and Beth. Maggie instead coldly says that he doesn't know shit about her pain and that he does not know Hershel or Beth, bringing up Gabriel's cowardice by hiding and shutting out members of his flock from the church. After Sasha kills a pack of dogs who prepared to attack the group and after barbecuing them for consumption, Gabriel pulls off his clerical collar and drops it into the fire. Soon after it rains, and he becomes remorseful after burning it, saying, "Sorry, my Lord..". In the episode "The Distance", Gabriel travels and arrives to Alexandria with the rest of the group. In the episode "Remember", Gabriel is seen entering Alexandria. In the episode "Spend", Father Gabriel is shown in the makeshift chapel, emotionally tearing pages out of a Bible. Gabriel later goes to Deanna's house and tries to convince her that Rick and the entire group are evil in disguise and the Alexandria community shouldn't have taken them in. He tells her she must take action but fears it might already be too late. Maggie overhears his plea to Deanna but she remains concealed and does not make her presence known. In the season finale "Conquer", Gabriel appears at the gates of Alexandria as Spencer Monroe lets him out. Gabriel claims he wishes to take a quick walk, and leaves the community. Gabriel then approaches a zombie distracted by eating a half-dead human, and calls out to it, saying "I'm ready!", intending to let the walker kill him. He then notices that the corpse the walker was eating is moving, indicating that the person is still alive, barely. The walker turns and approaches him, and, even though he knew that it was not human, still found it emotionally difficult to kill it. He rips its head off and smashes its head in with a rock, killing it. He then neared the suffering human and crushed his head in too, out of mercy. Due to this emotional trial, he breaks down on the road and cries. He then returns to the community where Spencer asks if his walk around outside the community was okay, Spencer then asks him if he could close the gate and walks away. Gabriel makes a halfhearted attempt to close the gate, failing to shut it properly. At night, he declines attending the gathering and instead goes into the chapel. He finds Sasha there, requesting emotional guidance, which he coldly denies her. He then taunts her by suggesting that her sins caused Bob's and Tyreese's deaths. Sasha angrily strikes him and threatens to kill him, and he is entirely unconcerned over it. Maggie intervenes and stops Sasha. Gabriel tells her she made a mistake in not letting Sasha kill him. Maggie convinces both of them to pray with her.

==== Season 6 ====
In the season premiere "First Time Again", Gabriel is no longer trusted by the rest of the group, who have found out about his betrayal and look at him with contempt, particularly Rick, despite Gabriel's earnest efforts to redeem himself by helping out around Alexandria. In the episode "JSS", Gabriel approaches Carl, saying that he is now ready to learn how to fight. After some hesitation, Carl agrees to start with a machete. During the Wolf attack, Gabriel manages to hold off one of the Wolves long enough for Morgan to rescue him. In the episode "Heads Up", Gabriel is shown putting up fliers for a sermon later that afternoon, only to have them taken down by Rick. In the mid-season finale "Start to Finish", Gabriel puts his machete training to good use, taking down several walkers as he takes shelter in Jessie's house along with Rick, Carl, Deanna, and Michonne (following the collapse of the guard tower). After the group has to disguise themselves with walker guts to reach the armory, Gabriel tells Rick that this time he will not run, regardless of what happens. Having witnessed Gabriel's efforts as a team player, Rick tells him "I know." In the mid-season premiere "No Way Out", Gabriel offers to take Judith to safety in his church. Rick is reluctant at first, but Gabriel promises to make it. When Rick and his group make a stand against the herd, Gabriel rallies the Alexandrians in his church and joins in the fight, killing many walkers. Two months later, Alexandria's walls have been expanded so as to include a neighboring church, which Gabriel now uses as his own church. When Rick and the others travel to the Hilltop Colony with Paul "Jesus" Monroe, Rick originally plans to leave Judith with Gabriel, the minister having fully earned his trust. In the episode "Not Tomorrow Yet", Gabriel joins the mission to storm the Saviors' compound. He and Rick are shown joking around during the trip, the animosity between them long gone. Gabriel remains outside during the shootout to keep watch and orders a wounded Savior to drop his weapon. He then recites a small prayer before killing the Savior. Gabriel is briefly seen in the episode "The Same Boat" being observed by another group of Saviors who have Carol and Maggie captive. In the season finale "Last Day on Earth", Rick leaves Gabriel in charge of Alexandria before leaving in the RV with Maggie and a few others towards the Hilltop.

==== Season 7 ====
In "Service," shortly after Negan starts asking Rick about Maggie, and talking about how he'd love to bring her back to The Sanctuary, Father Gabriel sneaks up from behind. Negan gets a bit spooked out as Gabriel introduces himself and asks if Negan would like to pay his respects towards Maggie. Negan questions Maggie's state, in which both Gabriel and Rick lead him to Maggie's "grave." They soon hear a shot, which Negan and Rick walk towards to investigate. Later, Rick thanks Gabriel for what he did, in which Gabriel insists that there's still faith to stop the Saviors. Rick informs him that there's nothing they can do, in which Gabriel states that things can change, giving an example of how they're both friends now, and it didn't used to be that way before. Gabriel, along with Rick and Carl, later witnesses David harassing Enid in the streets of Alexandria. In "Sing Me a Song," Gabriel, Spencer, Rosita, and Eugene get ready to scavenge for the Saviors. Gabriel insists they all go as a group, which Eugene agrees. Rosita and Eugene end up going to the factory alone, while Gabriel and Spencer head out on a car. Both Gabriel and Spencer have a discussion, in which Spencer asks if hating someone is a sin. Spencer then admits to Gabriel that he hates Rick. Gabriel expresses the fact that Rick has inspired him, but Spencer continues to claim that his family was better at leading Alexandria. Spencer finally says that he hopes Rick doesn't come back alive, which forces Gabriel to call him a "tremendous shit." After Spencer stops the car, Gabriel gets out and heads back to Alexandria. In "Hearts Still Beating," Gabriel urges Rosita to wait on killing Negan, insisting to do so much later when everyone has the advantage to take Negan on. Later, Gabriel, along with many other Alexandreans, witnesses the deaths of Spencer Monroe and Olivia. That night, Gabriel keeps watch while being watched by someone through binoculars.

In "Rock in the Road," Gabriel reads his bible during his night shift at the Alexandria gate. He stares into the darkness, a worried expression on his face, and leaves his post. In the pantry, Gabriel hurriedly fills crates with food and weapons. His bible falls to the ground as he skims through the weapons registry with shaky hands. He loads the crate into a car and leaves Alexandria. A dark figure is visible in the passenger seat. Rick and most of his group later encounter a group of mostly female survivors after Gabriel left the word "BOAT" in the supply room log, as a clue to his location. In "New Best Friends," Rick demands Jadis, at the junkyard, to show him where Gabriel is. Soon, several scavengers bring Gabriel out and when Jadis rejects Rick's requests, a fight breaks lose. Gabriel snatches a knife and threatens to kill Tamiel. Finally, Jadis signals the scavengers to lower their weapons. Later, Gabriel witnesses Rick walk towards the group with a smile, explaining that both he and Jadis have made the deal. In "Say Yes," Rosita has a harsh conversation with Gabriel at the church. She states the facts are that she almost killed Negan, and Gabriel patiently defends himself, explaining that the group needs her. In "Something They Need," Gabriel joins Rick, who leads a small group of Alexandrians towards The Oceanside; a location Tara had found earlier. Once the group arrives, they ask for the residents to join them, and ask for their guns. Soon, they're all attacked by walkers, and the group, along with some residents, kill all of the walkers. Finally, the group leaves with all of the guns. When they arrive back at Alexandria, Rosita tells them that someone is there. She leads them towards a room, where Dwight is waiting for them. Dwight tells Rick he wants to help, so Rick points his gun at him and tells him to kneel. In the season finale "The First Day of the Rest of Your Life," Gabriel is seen fighting back during the attack at Alexandria.

==== Season 8 ====
In the season premiere "Mercy", Gabriel travels to the Sanctuary with Rick and everyone to attack Negan and the Saviors. Gabriel tries to leave the Sanctuary but then spots Gregory in need to help, so he gives him a hand, but Gregory leaves Gabriel behind by taking his car and driving off. Gabriel rushes to safety to escape the walkers and find a trailer house. Inside he finds Negan there as the trailer house is surrounded by the dead, in "The Big Scary U" Gabriel appears in the same room as Negan, Negan gives a speech on how Rick got his people killed, and explains that he has killed people that deserved it. As Negan talks to Lucille, Gabriel takes his gun and tries to shoot him, he then locks himself in a little storage area inside the room and refuses to come out unless Negan confesses about his real wife. Once Negan mentions he had a real wife and couldn't put her down, he described himself as "weak". Gabriel comes out and Negan drags a walker out of a hole. He and Gabriel then rub walker guts on themselves and head outside. Once they are outside, they begin to make their way through the herd of walkers, Gabriel trips over a walker, and is saved by Negan, and he later saves Negan in return. They finally make it inside where they regroup with the other saviors, Negan orders his men to put Gabriel in a holding cell, Eugene later comes in and knocks on the door, unlocks it and sees Gabriel on the floor wounded. Eugene says "we need to get you to Dr. Carson 2.0", Gabriel then says "Dr. Carson is Maggie's, we need to get him out of here". In "Time for After" Gabriel is seen in the infirmary at the Sanctuary, being treated by Harlan Carson. He reveals to Eugene that Gabriel has a few infections and will need more help, he asks Eugene to watch over Gabriel as he heads down to the marketplace in search of medicine and herbs to treat Gabriel's infection. Gabriel reaches for water and Eugene watches him struggle a bit before helping him get a drink. Gabriel asks if Eugene is going to help him get the doctor out, but Eugene insists he only does what is in his own best interest. Gabriel tells him to have faith and trust himself. "It's absurd," Eugene tells him. Gabriel continues his plea, urging Eugene to do the right thing, later Eugene storms into Gabriel's room and tells him he will never help him escape and says that he will never put himself at risk. In "How It's Gotta Be" Gabriel is first seen in the hospital bed when Eugene comes in and reveals that he will allow him and Harlan to escape. Eugene has taken out the guard at the North Gate and prepared a vehicle so that Harlan and Gabriel can make it to the Hilltop and Harlan can take care of Maggie. Gabriel asks Eugene to come with him to the Hilltop, but he refuses and Eugene “drops” the key to the gate, and Gabriel compliments Eugene for doing the right thing.

In "Dead or Alive Or" a sick Gabriel escapes with Harlan Carson. They travel for miles, and eventually reach a cabin that contains medicines. Gabriel's overall health begins to improve, but he begins to lose sight in his left eye. when Gabriel and Harlan were moving away from the cottage Harlan set a trap for wolves and it gets stuck with the injured foot when suddenly walkers appear but Gabriel manages to save it and they are captured again by the rescuers, in an escape attempt by Harlan it costs him his life and Gabriel takes him to the sanctuary for work in Eugene's factory. In "Worth" Gabriel continues helping at Eugene's outpost helping to make bullets. Though Gabriel is recovering from his illness, he is still mostly blind and is forced to wear a mask to prevent others from getting sick. Eugene discovers that Gabriel has been tampering with the bullets which will cause them to backfire and harm the users. Gabriel explains that he only intended to make them ineffective so that no one would get hurt and is forced to sit to the side by Eugene, following Eugene's brief capture by Rosita and Daryl, he returns filled with new determination and puts Gabriel back on the bullet-making line. Eugene warns Gabriel that he can either follow directions this time "or you can cry and die." In the season finale "Wrath" Gabriel returned to the Sanctuary once the bullets were created and accompanied Negan in his vehicle to the place where he was going to unleash the war to confess as he had done previously. Confused by the new attitude of the man of wanting to kill everyone leaving aside his old law that people were a resource; Gabriel took advantage of the fact that a wayfarer blocked his way to escape from his captors and into the forest, although it was not long before he was captured by Eugene and Laura and returned to the vehicle. Held at gunpoint by Negan, Gabriel was condemned to die and prepared for his end as the villain counting down as his teammates searched for him and luckily managed to save himself when all the weapons exploded thanks to Eugene's plans. With the great war over, Gabriel returned to the remains of his church, leaning on a walking stick and finally understood the purpose God had given him in the war.

=== The Walking Dead: The Ones Who Live ===
In "Become," Gabriel appears in flashbacks starting three years before the present. Jadis, going by her real name of Anne, returns to the area around Alexandria where she meets with Gabriel once a year. Anne refuses to tell Gabriel about her new community and does not reveal her knowledge that Rick Grimes is still alive, but privately confides in Gabriel that while she is committed to the CRM's cause, Anne is conflicted about the number of people that they are killing. Gabriel insists that Anne is still a good person and that she is not coming back every year, she never really left. After the war with the Whisperers, Gabriel attempts to enlist her help with Alexandria's dire situation, but Anne cannot help. Anne finds herself unable to kill Gabriel which he uses as proof that she is still a good person, promising to meet her in another year.

In the present, a dying Jadis realizes that Gabriel was right about the person that she is, and she decides to die as Anne rather than as Warrant Officer Jadis Stokes - having adopted Gabriel's last name as a part of her alias - of the CRM. Anne gives Rick a wedding ring that Gabriel had found for him shortly before Rick disappeared, Rick having discussed Gabriel marrying Rick and Michonne on the bridge before his supposed death. On Anne's request, Rick kills her, and he and Michonne get married using the ring that Gabriel had found for them.

When Anne fails to show up to their yearly meeting, a heartbroken Gabriel realizes that she is dead and crafts a makeshift grave marker for her.

== Casting ==
Gilliam was initially reported to have joined the cast in an unknown role in May 2014. During the series' San Diego Comic-Con panel it was revealed that he would be playing the pivotal comic role of Father Gabriel.
