= The King, the Widow, and Rick =

- The Walking Dead episode
- Carl and Siddiq slowly approach a group of walkers in the woods outside of Alexandria
- Episode no.: Season 8 Episode 6
- Directed by: John Polson
- Written by: Angela Kang; Corey Reed
- Cinematography by: Duane Manwiller
- Editing by: Evan Schrodek
- Original air date: November 26, 2017
- Running time: 45 minutes

Guest appearances
- Cooper Andrews as Jerry; Kenric Green as Scott; Avi Nash as Siddiq; Thomas Francis Murphy as Brion; Sabrina Gennarino as Tamiel; James Chen as Kal; Peter Zimmerman as Eduardo; Kerry Cahill as Dianne; Macsen Lintz as Henry; Nadine Marissa as Nabila; Callan McAuliffe as Alden; Joshua Mikel as Jared; Adam Fristoe as Dean; Ciera L. Payton as Zia; Adam Cronan as Leo

Episode chronology
| ← Previous "The Big Scary U" | Next → "Time for After" |
- The Walking Dead season 8

"The King, the Widow, and Rick" is the sixth episode of the eighth season of the post-apocalyptic horror television series The Walking Dead, which aired on AMC on November 26, 2017. The episode was written by Angela Kang and Corey Reed, and directed by John Polson.

== Plot ==
In the days after the onset of the war against Negan and the Saviors, Rick, Maggie, and Carol correspond with each other to report on their victories and losses, and make plans to launch the next phase of the plan in a few days: Aaron returns to Hilltop with baby Gracie; Jesus keeps watch over the Saviors they have captured, secured on the fence outside of the community; Rick has traveled to the Scavengers' base to meet with Jadis.

Maggie expresses disappointment that Jesus is using their supplies to provide them food and water, while Gregory suggest they build gallows to hang them. However, Jesus reminds them that by killing their prisoners they would be no better than the Saviors. Maggie later decides to allow the Saviors inside, imprisoned in a makeshift cage, as long as they do not cause trouble. She then sends Gregory into the pen to be imprisoned with the Saviors, despite his loud protests, as she cannot trust him either. In private, Jesus thanks Maggie for keeping the Saviors alive, but she sees them as future bargaining chips.

In the Kingdom, Ezekiel has secluded himself in his home, refusing to allow others to see him. Carol works to prepare other able-bodied residents to help in Rick's plan. Henry, Benjamin's younger brother, desperately wants to participate despite her hesitation, and eventually she relents. Afterwards, Carol is able to approach Ezekiel and tries to encourage him to take up leadership again, even if he just maintains his act. Ezekiel remains reluctant to participate and tells her to leave him alone.

At the Scavengers' base, Rick shows Jadis the Polaroid photos of their victories and offers to deal with them in his war despite their previous actions; Jadis refuses to deal. With no options left, Rick is taken and kept prisoner inside a shipping container, stripped down to his boxer shorts.

Meanwhile at Alexandria, Michonne is anxious to know what is happening, feeling responsible for the war as she had urged Rick to take a stand toward the Saviors. Rosita offers to come with her to see what is happening at the Sanctuary. Tara is surprised to find Daryl, fixated on taking his own actions outside of Rick's plan, waiting on her porch. When she vows to kill Dwight after the war is over, Daryl proposes they kill him together and suggests that they don't have to wait.

Elsewhere, Carl goes scavenging outside Alexandria and encounters Siddiq. Carl apologizes for Rick's previous hostility toward Siddiq, and offers him food and water. Seeing that Siddiq was trapping a walker, Carl asks Siddiq the three questions that Rick uses to judge potential members of his group and is satisfied with his answers. Carl decides to lead Siddiq back to Alexandria, promising to vouch for him once they get there. En route, they are attacked by a small group of walkers, some of which pin down Carl before he dispatches them; appearing uninjured, they continue on.

On the way to the Sanctuary, Michonne and Rosita hear loud music and find two Saviors nearby trying to load a truck with speakers, which they plan to use to lure away the walkers surrounding the Sanctuary. Michonne and Rosita kill one of them, but the other escapes with the truck, until it is sideswiped by a garbage truck driven by Daryl and Tara, killing the other Savior. The four travel together to the Sanctuary, seeing the walkers still surround it; Daryl decides they need to take action now.

In a library at the Hilltop, Aaron shares his feelings of loss with Maggie, who understands his pain firsthand. Taking Maggie's words to heart, Aaron decides to go on a personal mission. Before departing, Enid offers to join him; Aaron agrees.

== Reception ==
=== Critical reception ===
"The King, the Widow, and Rick" received poor reviews from critics. On Rotten Tomatoes, it holds a 36% score with an average rating of 5.80 out of 10, based on 28 reviews. The site's consensus reads: "The King, The Widow, and Rick" spreads itself between too many storylines, and thereby doesn't accomplish much in the process. It is also the worst reviewed episode of the series on the website, tying with "Diverged" (season 10, episode 21), which has an average rating of 4.60 out of 10, based on 14 reviews.

=== Ratings ===
The episode averaged a 3.6 rating among adults 18-49, and had a viewership of 8.28 million viewers, which marked an increase from the previous week which was a six-year low for the series.
