= Jadis (The Walking Dead) =

Fictional character

Anne / Jadis
- The Walking Dead character
- Jadis / Anne, as portrayed by Pollyanna McIntosh in the television series.
- First appearance: "New Best Friends"; The Walking Dead; February 19, 2017
- Last appearance: "Become"; The Walking Dead: The Ones Who Live; March 24, 2024
- Created by: Scott M. Gimple
- Portrayed by: Pollyanna McIntosh

In-universe information
- Occupation: Art Teacher; Artist; Leader of the Scavengers; Warrant Officer of the Civic Republic Military
- Significant other: Fr. Gabriel Stokes

Anne (better known as Jadis and later Jadis Stokes) is a fictional character from the horror drama television franchise The Walking Dead, appearing in the self-titled television series, The Walking Dead: World Beyond, and The Walking Dead: The Ones Who Live, which air on AMC in the United States and are based on the comic book series of the same name. She is portrayed by Pollyanna McIntosh. Jadis is an original character in the television series and has no counterpart in the comics.

== Appearances ==
=== Personality ===
Jadis is initially introduced as the oddly-spoken and enigmatic leader of the Scavengers. She is calm and collected, but also very cunning and sly. Though she originally only speaks in contrived broken English (and complains that others talk too much), she reverts to full sentences following the murders of the Scavengers by Simon and members of the Saviors. Later, as Anne, she is a fully accepted member of the Alexandria community beginning in season 9, and starts a relationship with Fr. Gabriel Stokes, which does not last the full run of the season. She keeps secret details of her connection with a mysterious organization still flying helicopters many years into the apocalypse and eventually leaves to rejoin them, taking a critically injured Rick Grimes with her by helicopter. In The Walking Dead: World Beyond, Jadis has become completely loyal to the CRM and is hardened and ruthless in her actions. Jadis tells Huck that she truly believes that the CRM is the last light in the world and that they must be allowed to succeed in their plans.

=== Season 7 ===
In the mid-season premiere "Rock in the Road", Jadis's group kidnapped Gabriel and then ambushed Rick's team as they searched for him. In the episode "New Best Friends", when asked by Rick to join forces to defeat the Saviors, Jadis is reluctant but takes it into consideration after being told that they could gain more supplies. Jadis tells Rick he needs to prove his worth and she pushes him down a trash heap into a pit of trash and metal. After watching Rick kill a heavily armored walker, she tells him that she and her people will help him, but that they need a lot of guns. In the episode "Say Yes", when Rick's group delivers 63 guns to her, she tells him that it is not enough, claiming they need nearly twice as many guns. Rick and Jadis renegotiate and agree that he will keep 20 of the guns while he searches for more. He finds the needed guns at Oceanside in the episode "Something They Need", seemingly clinching the Scavengers' support. In the season finale "The First Day of the Rest of Your Life", on the day of the battle, she crudely propositions Rick upon arrival at Alexandria. Together, the Scavengers and the Alexandrians wire up bombs at the gates ready for the enemy. When the explosion fails as Negan and his men wait by the gates, Jadis pulls a gun on Rick and the Scavengers follow suit with the rest of the Alexandrians. She reveals that she told Negan of Rick's plan and was offered a "better deal" by the Saviors. When the Saviors get distracted by the re-animated Sasha, Rick attempts to make another deal with her, but Jadis refuses and shoots him in the abdomen; she pushes him off the platform. During the battle, she flees with her group through smoke bombs.

=== Season 8 ===
In the episode "The King, the Widow, and Rick", after the war between the Saviors and the banded survivors has begun, Rick again attempts to get Jadis on his side. She imprisons him in a shipping container. In the episode "Time for After", Jadis releases him to fight with another armed walker. He decapitates the walker and disarms her men, giving her new terms which she appears to accept. In the mid-season finale "How It's Gotta Be", Rick is abandoned by Jadis and her Scavengers when they discover the aftermath of Daryl's attack on the Sanctuary and are fired on by Savior soldiers.

In the episode "The Lost and the Plunderers", Simon, not pleased with Negan's approach and knowing the Hilltop has the rest of his 38 men in captivity, goes to the Scavengers' junkyard and accuses Jadis of going back on their deal with the Saviors, but gives her Negan's offer of returning to the original terms of their deal and giving over all their guns. Jadis agrees, but Simon does not believe Jadis is showing enough remorse and kills her two lieutenants, Tamiel and Brion, in cold blood. She punches him, causing Simon to then order his men to kill the rest of the Scavengers. By the time Rick and Michonne arrive at the junkyard, all of the Scavengers but Jadis have reanimated. They find Jadis alone, having dropped her aloof nature. She explains that she had been an artist before the outbreak, having used the junkyard for materials, but afterwards, she and the Scavengers saw the junkyard as a way to keep themselves isolated from the rest of the world while using the entire yard as their canvas.

Rick, tired of Jadis' double-crosses, decides to abandon her as he and Michonne escape. Jadis lures the remaining walkers into an industrial shredder to protect herself, crying to herself as she watches her former friends be destroyed. In the episode "The Key", Jadis captures Negan at gunpoint. In the episode "Still Gotta Mean Something", in flashback, Jadis plays dead to save herself from the massacre of the Scavengers by Simon and the Saviors. In the present, she takes time to compose herself before collecting a captive Negan and carrying his modified baseball bat, "Lucille", and a suitcase. Negan tries to apologize for what happened to her people, recognizing that Simon had gone against his orders in wiping out the Scavengers, but Jadis is steadfast and still threatens to kill him. While she is out of sight, he is able to access her suitcase, containing a gun and pictures from her past, convincing her to talk lest he destroy them with a flare. He reveals that he named his bat after his late wife, Lucille, and, like Jadis' pictures, his bat is the last thing he has to remember his previous life. Jadis suddenly rushes him, more to get at the flare, but it is knocked out of their hands into a puddle, and extinguishes. She runs off to get another flare as a helicopter hovers briefly overhead before disappearing, too late to see Jadis' second flare. Jadis breaks down into tears. Jadis lets Negan go; he offers her to come with him and follow a new path, but she refuses. In the season finale "Wrath", Jadis tells Morgan that he can call her "Anne". Morgan comes to the junkyard and tells her she can go anywhere she wants now that Negan has been defeated, so she leaves, but he stays in her place.

=== Season 9 ===
In the season premiere "A New Beginning," Anne, now a fully accepted member of the Alexandria community, joins a supply run into Washington, D.C. Having visited the Smithsonian Museum once with her class when she was still a teacher, Anne is able to lead the group to a cache of supplies in the basement of the museum. On their return, they find the bridge to Hilltop is out, and Rick develops a plan to rebuild it. In the episode "The Bridge", Anne helps with this reconstruction, during which she and Father Gabriel start to discover feelings for each other. However, while on watch one night, she spots a helicopter flying overhead. In the episode "Warning Signs", the next day she departs from the construction camp, unaware Gabriel is following her. Back at the scrapyard, she recovers a walkie-talkie and talks to an unidentified man on the other end. The man tells her she missed her pickup and they will only pick her up if she brings an "A" with her. Anne discovers Gabriel and subdues him. In the episode "The Obliged", she prepares to feed Gabriel to a walker but cannot come to do it, but she still tells the man on the other end of the walkie-talkie that she has his "A". Gabriel recognizes that Anne has been engaging in human trafficking, but she lets him go while she flees to meet with the helicopter. In the episode "What Comes After", she races to the meeting point, insisting to the man she still has her "A". While waiting at the site, she witnesses the smoke set up by Rick's destruction of the bridge, and among the various walker bodies that float down river, she finds a heavily-wounded Rick washed ashore. She reports to the landing helicopter that she has a "B" and he needs their help. Anne and Rick are loaded on the helicopter and taken away.

=== The Walking Dead: World Beyond ===
==== Season 2 ====
Jadis appears again in The Walking Dead: World Beyond season 2.

Jadis first appears in a mid-credits scene in the episode "Quatervois", revealing that Lieutenant Colonel Elizabeth Kublek has been recalled to the Civic Republic and that she is now in charge of the Civic Republic Military (CRM) research facility for the time being. Now a warrant officer in the CRM, she is going by the name of Jadis Stokes. Jadis has now become a full believer in the CRM cause, stating that the CRM truly is the last light in the world. In the episode "Who Are You?", while talking with Huck, Jadis confirms that her real name is not in fact Jadis, but "that name - that identity - it helped me live so Jadis is who I am." Jadis tells Huck, who used to be her mentor, that she has spent six years with the CRM at this point and she briefly mentions several events such as being the leader of a group and their massacre. Jadis also states that she had traded "something very valuable" to get a new life with the CRM. Jadis later tells Huck in the series finale "The Last Light" that while she had an 'A', she lied and said that they were a 'B' because she owed them more than letting them become a test subject in the CRM's experiments.

In "Who Are You?", Jadis begins running a full security audit which is interrupted by the theft of a vial of a variant of chlorine gas. After Silas Plaskett is captured, Jadis personally interrogates him and grows to like the young man, showing an interest in him as a future CRM soldier. In the episode "Blood and Lies", Jadis releases him into the custody of Dennis Graham who backs up Silas' story despite knowing that he is actually lying. Recognizing Jadis, Dennis is clearly not pleased to see her or to learn of her investigation. Working with Huck, she interrogates Dr. Leo Bennett, only to have Dr. Lyla Belshaw reveal that Leo had stolen the vial and the true nature of her secret work which involves studying reanimation as it happens in her test subjects, many of whom have been killed by the CRM either directly or indirectly. After pressuring Leo into agreeing to work for them on the project, Jadis reveals that she had always known the truth and was testing Huck's allegiance and using the situation to back Leo into a corner. On Jadis' orders, Huck reluctantly kills Lyla by unleashing one of her own test subjects, Barca, onto her while Jadis mocks the dying scientist. With Huck having proved her allegiance and earned her full trust, Jadis reveals to her the next stage of the CRM's plan: wipe out the survivor settlement in Portland, Oregon which is over 87,000 people.

In the episode "Returning Point", as the scientists begin their rebellion after learning the truth from Leo, Jadis has the facility locked down in order to "learn how far the rot has spread," resulting in the Bennett's, Percy, Felix, the scientists, their bodyguards and a captured Mason Beale getting locked in the bio-containment unit. However, the facility's own lockdown protocols prevent Jadis and her men from reaching them for a few hours until the system can be rebooted. Brody, one of the council of the nearby artist community known as the Perimeter, betrays his people and reveals their alliance with the Endlings to Jadis, causing her to send men to kill everyone in the Perimeter. However, Huck kills Brody after he tries to blackmail her into securing him a permanent home in the Civic Republic. The Perimeter's leader Indira tries to talk Jadis down and although Jadis respects Indira for her art, referencing her past as the leader of the Scavengers, Jadis believes that Indira and her people cannot survive for long in this world and that their destruction by a larger group is as inevitable as the destruction of the Scavengers was. Jadis orders her men to carry out the execution, but the intervention of Will Campbell, Dennis Graham and Silas Plaskett leads to the deaths of all of her men with only a few losses on the other side. At the same time, the scientists escape into the old mining tunnels below the facility, setting C4 charges to cover their escape. Jadis reports to Huck that the scientists have wiped all of their research from the facility's mainframe and are trying to take it with them in a full rebellion. Concerned that such a betrayal could lead to the end of everything that they have built, Jadis orders her men into the tunnels where they are to kill everyone as an example to those who come after them. In the episode "Death and the Dead", when the scientists escape the area, they are cornered by Jadis and several soldiers. Jadis attempts to convince Iris to stop the rebellion, but she refuses, saying the CRM are evil, citing the genocide of Omaha and the Campus Colony as an example. Jadis defends the destruction of Omaha and the Campus Colony, saying they and Portland have become too reliant on the Civic Republic and will eventually fall to famine and disease, so the CRM destroyed Omaha and the Campus Colony as well as planning on destroying Portland as a form of euthanasia to spare the residents the famine and disease that will eventually befall Omaha, the Campus Colony and Portland. In "The Last Light", when Iris still refuses to surrender, Jadis orders the soldiers to open fire on the Iris and the scientists. Huck then turns on Jadis, shooting several of the soldiers and buying Iris and the scientists time to escape. Fleeing back into the research facility, Jadis and Huck fight, which Jadis wins by stabbing Huck in the stomach with a knife. However, Huck revealed that she has rigged the research facility with explosives timed to explode soon. Jadis quickly flees the scene in a helicopter as the facility explodes, destroying the final sources of chlorine gas.

Back at the Civic Republic, Jadis meets with Kublek, who she charges with treason against the Civic Republic and has her sentenced to prison. Silas later joins the CRM to become a soldier, but also to act as a secret informant, unbeknownst to Jadis, who takes him on as her protégé.

=== The Walking Dead: The Ones Who Live ===
Three years before the events of The Ones Who Live, Anne meets Gabriel alone in a forest, she reveals she is a member of a new group. The two discuss forgiveness for her previous lives, and Gabriel tells her about Rick’s supposed death. Exactly one year later, the two meet again, Gabriel gives her a ring she found that he intended to give to Rick to marry Michonne, and she expresses remorse for her past and current actions. Gabriel asks that her group give aid for Alexandria following food shortages from a war, but she cannot. The next year, Gabriel again attempts to convince her to return, she states that he is now a loose end and knocks him to the ground, pointing a gun at him. Gabriel challenges her, telling her to do it, although she is not who she is now. After hesitating, she instead kills a nearby walker before telling him to go, Gabriel replies that she has her answer.

When Michonne locates Rick and becomes a consigneee, she falsely claims her name is Dana and that she and her sister were once part of a large community that fell during her interview. Anne sees this interview and deletes the footage, she confronts Rick at his apartment and warns him she will kill everyone in Alexandria if the two attempt to escape, before asking what he is doing.

Jadis states that if she has placed a file among her possessions detailing Alexandria that, in the event of her death, will lead to the CRM finding and destroying it. When Rick asks why she didn’t do this before, she replies that the two of them together can do anything. Rick organises for Michonne’s escape by faking her death, and convinces Jadis to help him as he will stay, however, he finds that Michonne has refused to leave without him. After a mission, Jadis meets with Rick again, and Michonne spots her, but Rick drags her into a helicopter before she can say anything. Michonne later forces herself and Rick out of the helicopter which then crashes. Jadis joins a squad to clean up the crash, but then returns alone to confirm their deaths. Upon finding a car missing, she follows them.

She confronts the two as they sleep, Rick attempts to convince her to let them go, addressing her as ‘Anne’. A fight ensues in which she is wounded and attempts to escape in a car. The two pursue her and she crashes, she finds a group of struggling survivors and convinces them to lure them into a trap. In the trap, another fight ensues in which the group are devoured by walkers, a standoff begins, and Jadis again reiterates that Alexandria will be destroyed if she dies. Rick and Michonne appear to make a deal for Michonne to leave while Rick returns to the CRM to receive the Echelon briefing, a series of secrets that only a select few in the CRM know. As she does not trust Rick, she prepares to execute him, only for Michonne to return with a new weapon and hold her at gunpoint. Before anything can happen, surviving walkers bite her in the neck.

As she dies, Anne thinks back in her previous lives, and states she was tired of losing every community she was a part of, and attempted to preserve both Alexandria and the CRM so she wouldn’t lose it. She tells the two where the file on Alexandria is and asks that they do not attempt to stop the CRM. Michonne refuses, stating that Rick will receive the Echelon briefing, and that they will reveal it to the citizens of the CRM, who will revolt. She then gives Rick the ring that Gabriel gave to her, and states that she wishes she had died an artist. At Anne's prompting, Rick shoots her in the head in an act of mercy. Both Rick and Michonne are conflicted by her death, having to turn their heads away when Rick shoots Anne. After Anne doesn't show up to their yearly meeting, a heartbroken Gabriel realizes that she's dead and creates a makeshift grave marker for Anne.

== Development and reception ==
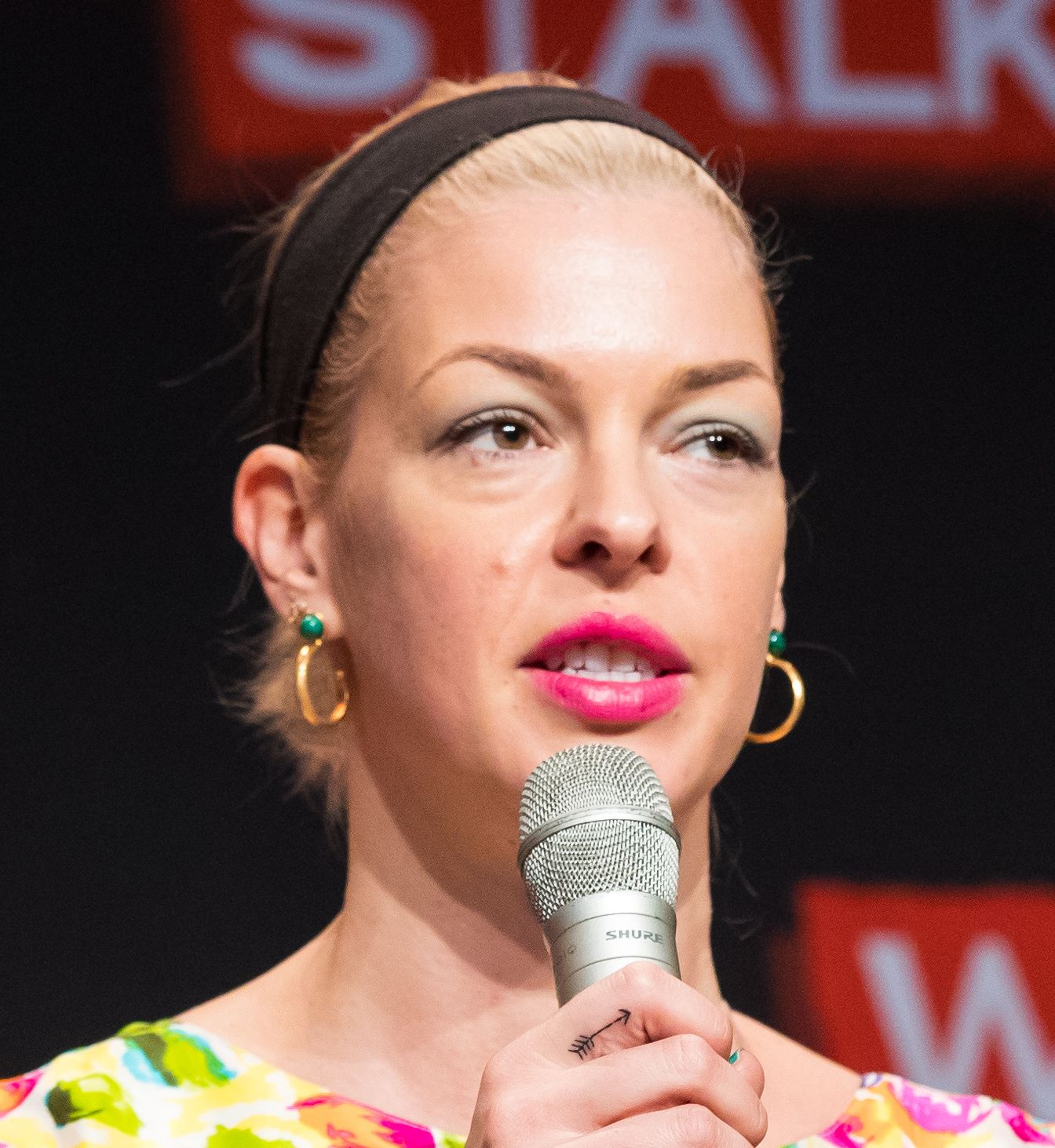
Pollyanna McIntosh portrays Jadis/Anne

Pollyanna McIntosh appears as Jadis in what was just a recurring role in 3 episodes of The Walking Dead's seventh season. However, for the eighth season of the show she was promoted to the main cast.

=== As Jadis ===
Ron Hagan for Den of Geek! in his review of season 7 episode "Something They Need" said, "Jadis and the garbage men (best band name ever) are a prime example of the writers having a little fun with the show, creating a new faction that is both wholly original and fits in with the overall mythology of the show." Kevin Fitzpatrick of Screen Crush reviewed the season finale "The First Day of the Rest of Your Life" and said that "there's a notable dichotomy between treating that reveal [of Sasha's death] as a moment of surprise, and having Jadis and the junkyard folks' betrayal actually catch viewers off-guard. The outbreak of war itself isn't any major shock, nor is the lack of any notable casualties, but a non-comic element like Jadis felt like the one true wild card in an otherwise predictable showdown." He also commented that "as much as Jadis' interaction with Negan reiterates the amusing distinction* her group provides, the 'Heapsters' heel-turn does mean we spent two or three episodes building these characters up as allies, only to have them turn with little explanation, and essentially guarantee their role as enemies next season" and that "Jadis' proposition to 'lay with' Rick offered another wonderful moment of weirdness for this oddly monosyllabic group, but why even bother, given what she knew of how the exchange would go down?" Blair Marnell of CraveOnline commented on how "Jadis and her Scavengers had betrayed Rick's group to the Saviors. Really? You mean it wasn’t a good idea to hunt down guns and give them to these cartoon psychos that they barely knew? There are times when the TV show improves upon the comic book’s storyline, but this was not one of those occasions. From the start, the Scavengers have felt out of place on this series, and it would have been refreshing to see all of them end up as tiger food." Marnell also said that "At least Jadis had a very funny moment in which she propositioned Rick right in front of Michonne and basically asked if Michonne had a problem with that. The facial expressions of Danai Gurira and Andrew Lincoln were really priceless. That take on Jadis could have had more potential, if all of her followers didn't also have the same strange way of speaking. There was simply nothing more to Jadis or the Scavengers other than their bizarre trash motif." Stuart Jeffries of The Guardian called her hairstyle "the fringe that's an unwitting homage to King Henry V of England c1415" and said that "Jadis and her gang turned their guns on the Alexandrians. Even Michonne found herself in the cross hairs of a former ally on the roof. Why did it have to be this way, Jadis, why? 'I got a better deal,' quoth she. Just hope, for her sake, the deal she struck with Negan includes a few hours at a top salon, if you catch my drift." Elise Nakhnikian of Slant Magazine was critical that "the mystery isn't so much why Jadis betrayed Rick as why he ever trusted her in the first place. She clearly never gave a damn about his safety or well-being, tossing him off her trash heap to fight with the armored walker on their first meeting, and she was a mercurial and unreasonable trading partner, insisting that Rick's people go back for more guns after they'd risked so much to bring her the first batch. Yet he keeps trying to negotiate with her even after she shoots him, offering to strike a new deal until she casually pushes him off yet another high platform, annoyed that he failed to obey her command to kneel down."

Zack Handlen of The A.V. Club reviewed the season eight episode "Time for After" and said: "After capitulating to Rick because he beat up some people, Jadis tries negotiating. She wants to sculpt him in the nude. He refuses, and while I get that posing naked in a garbage dump for strangers isn’t everybody’s idea of a good time, I’m a little disappointed." Steve Ford of TV Fanatic reviewed the same episode, saying "It was interesting how Jadis came around after having her face inches away from that walker head's gnawing teeth. Perhaps she admires Rick's tenacity. However, I wouldn't put it past Jadis to turn on Rick yet again, but I think she'll follow Rick at least for the time being. "

=== As Anne ===
The season 9 episode "What Comes After" marked the last appearance of both Andrew Lincoln (Rick Grimes) as well as Pollyanna McIntosh (Jadis/Anne). Both actors have been confirmed to take a role in a series of three AMC Original Films to continue Rick's story, with production on the first to initially start in 2019. Lincoln had been working with Scott Gimple, the former showrunner and now current content manager for all of AMC's The Walking Dead properties, about how Rick's story could continue for some time. They had established early on that it needed to involve Jadis and the helicopter, and established these elements in earlier seasons to prepare for this point.

=== Civil Republic Military ===
On the role in The Walking Dead: World Beyond, AMC Network's Scott Gimple confirmed in a press release: "In our story, years have passed—we'll get hints of what happened with that fateful helicopter ride and learn Jadis has new allies and alliances; she is a big part of connecting the CRM and Three Circles mythology that's seen throughout all three series. We can't wait to share it all with fans of the TWDU."

Writing about the return, Alec Bojalad for Den of Geek said that Jadis has come a long way since, "First introduced as a quite literal garbage person in The Walking Dead season 7, Jadis received the honor of being the character that brought Rick Grimes (Andrew Lincoln) to safety so that he could live another day…and get his own spinoff movie franchise. Now the character is on to big things once again." Bojalad speculated that the new role could be setting up the movie spin-off.

McIntosh said of her return: "I love the character of Jadis, and I love this world, so getting to inhabit her again in collaboration with the talented team at The Walking Dead: World Beyond in beautiful Richmond, Virginia was a joy."

Walking Dead Chief Content Officer Scott Gimple has said that McIntosh as Jadis/Anne is planned to appear in the upcoming spin-offs, telling the story of what happened after Rick and Jadis departed in a helicopter.
