= Angela Kang =

American television writer (born 1976)

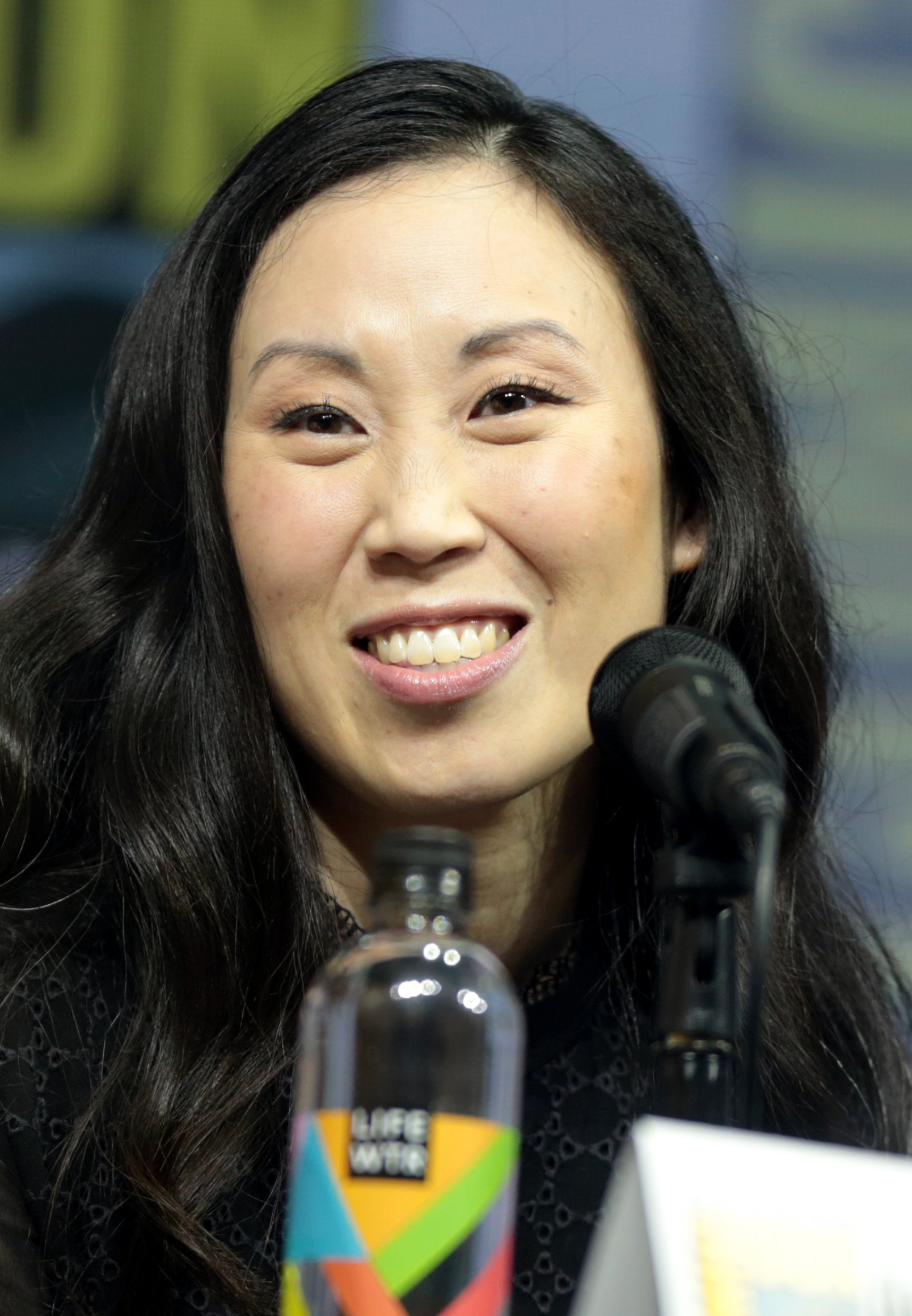
- Kang at the 2018 San Diego Comic-Con
- Born: March 23, 1976 (age 49); Irvine, California, U.S.
- Occupation(s): Television writer Showrunner
- Known for: Terriers; The Walking Dead

Angela Kang (born March 23, 1976) is an American television writer known for serving as showrunner on the AMC horror drama series The Walking Dead for the final three seasons.

== Early life ==
Kang was born and raised in Irvine, California, the daughter of working-class Korean immigrants. She received a Bachelor of Arts in English and Theater from Occidental College in Los Angeles, California in 1998, after which she had several short stories and poems published, and also wrote a number of plays. She eventually returned to school where she received a Master of Fine Arts degree in screenwriting from the University of Southern California where she was the recipient of the Annenberg Graduation Fellowship.

== Television career ==
Her first job in the television industry came when she worked as an intern for the ABC medical drama series Grey's Anatomy and Private Practice. Her first job as a staff writer was for the unaired NBC post-apocalyptic series Day One, which she got coming out of graduate school. Shortly thereafter, she was hired as a staff writer on the short-lived FX series Terriers, of which she wrote two episodes. She also wrote the short films Slow Pitch in Relief (2009) and Harlequin (2004).

In 2011, she joined the writing staff of the acclaimed AMC horror drama series The Walking Dead as a story editor for season two. She was promoted to producer for season three (2012–2013), co-executive producer for season five (2014–2015), and showrunner for seasons nine through eleven (2018–2022). Kang also starred on the Talking Dead, a talk show talking about The Walking Dead and Fear the Walking Dead. Following the conclusion of the 11th and final season of The Walking Dead, Kang was announced to serve as showrunner of the spin-off series The Walking Dead: Daryl Dixon, originally set to focus on the characters of Daryl Dixon (Norman Reedus) as well as Carol Peletier (Melissa McBride). In April 2022, she exited the project as showrunner, but remained as an executive producer. In 2022, she signed an overall deal with Amazon and joined the SSU series Silk: Spider-Society as showrunner. In 2024, Amazon chose to no longer move forward with the series after they requested it to focus less heavily on Silk, and returned the rights to Sony so the studio could shop the series to other networks.

== Works ==
=== Terriers ===
- Staff Writer – 12 Episodes (2010)
- Writer – 2 Episodes (2010)

=== The Walking Dead ===
- Producer – 32 Episodes (2012–2014)
- Co-Executive Producer – 64 Episodes (2014–2018)
- Executive Producer – 62 Episodes (2018–2022)
- Writer – 28 Episodes (2011–2021)
- Story Editor – 13 Episodes (2011–2012)
- Story by – 2 Episode (2017–2022)
- Teleplay by – 1 Episode (2017)

=== Terriers episodes ===
- 1.06 – "Ring-a-Ding-Ding"
- 1.12 – "Quid Pro Quo" (co-written with Leslye Headland)

=== The Walking Dead episodes ===
- 2.06 – "Secrets"
- 2.11 – "Judge, Jury, Executioner"
- 3.05 – "Say the Word"
- 3.11 – "I Ain't a Judas"
- 4.02 – "Infected"
- 4.12 – "Still"
- 4.16 – "A" (co-written with Scott M. Gimple)
- 5.03 – "Four Walls and a Roof" (co-written with Corey Reed)
- 5.08 – "Coda"
- 5.15 – "Try"
- 6.03 – "Thank You"
- 6.10 – "The Next World" (co-written with Corey Reed)
- 6.13 – "The Same Boat"
- 7.03 – "The Cell"
- 7.07 – "Sing Me a Song" (co-written with Corey Reed)
- 7.09 – "Rock in the Road"
- 7.14 – "The Other Side"
- 7.16 – "The First Day of the Rest of Your Life" (co-written with Scott M. Gimple and Matthew Negrete)
- 8.05 – "The Big Scary U" (co-written with Scott M. Gimple and David Leslie Johnson)
- 8.06 – "The King, the Widow, and Rick" (co-written with Corey Reed)
- 8.08 – "How It's Gotta Be" (co-written with David Leslie Johnson)
- 8.10 – "The Lost and the Plunderers" (co-written with Channing Powell and Corey Reed)
- 8.13 – "Do Not Send Us Astray" (co-written with Matthew Negrete)
- 8.16 – "Wrath" (co-written with Scott M. Gimple and Matthew Negrete)
- 9.01 – "A New Beginning"
- 9.16 – "The Storm" (co-written with Matthew Negrete)
- 10.01 – "Lines We Cross"
- 11.01 – "Acheron: Part I" (co-written with Jim Barnes)
- 11.02 – "Acheron: Part II" (co-written with Jim Barnes)
- 11.24 – "Rest in Peace" (story)
