= King Ezekiel =

Ezekiel
- The Walking Dead character
- King Ezekiel, as he appears in the comic book series (left) and as portrayed by Khary Payton on the television series (right)
- First appearance: Comic: "Issue #108" (2013); Television: "The Well" (2016)
- Last appearance: Comic: "Issue #145" (2015); Television: "Rest in Peace" (2022)
- Created by: Robert Kirkman; Charlie Adlard
- Adapted by: Scott M. Gimple (The Walking Dead)
- Portrayed by: Khary Payton

In-universe information
- Occupation: Zookeeper; Leader of the Kingdom; Co-Leader of the Militia; Television: Amateur Theater Actor; Hilltop Council Member; Animal Control for the Commonwealth; Governor of the Commonwealth
- Family: Shiva (pet tiger)
- Spouses: Television: Carol Peletier (ex-wife)
- Significant others: Comic: Michonne
- Children: Television: Henry (adopted son)

King Ezekiel (full name in the television series: Ezekiel Sutton) is a fictional character from the comic book series The Walking Dead and the television series of the same name, on which he is portrayed by Khary Payton.

Ezekiel is the leader of the Kingdom, a community of survivors terrorized by a vicious group called the Saviors. Other communities including the Hilltop and the Alexandria Safe-Zone suffer the same subjugation. The communities, led by Ezekiel, Maggie at the Hilltop, and Rick at Alexandria, team up in an all-out war against the Saviors and their leader, Negan. Ezekiel has a loyal pet tiger, Shiva, that he saved from the zoo in the early days of the apocalypse when he was a zookeeper. Although Shiva can be deadly to Ezekiel's enemies, she is not a threat to the Kingdom's peaceful residents and guests. Instead, Ezekiel rules by the consent of his community, who believe in his charismatic leadership skills and ability to keep them safe. In the comics, Ezekiel enters into a romantic relationship with Michonne, while on the show, he instead marries Carol.

== Appearances ==
=== Comic book series ===
Ezekiel, referred to as "King Ezekiel" by his fellow citizens, is the leader of a community known as The Kingdom. Ezekiel was formerly a zookeeper and has known his pet tiger, Shiva, since she was born.

At some point, Ezekiel meets and forms a friendship with Paul "Jesus" Monroe, who invites his community to join a trading network that includes The Hilltop community that Jesus belongs to. Ezekiel later discovers the Saviors are threatening and harassing the other communities in the trade network in exchange for supplies and possibly sees how vicious their leader, Negan really is (despite the truce offered by the Saviors).

Ezekiel bides his time and waits for the opportune moment to strike back against the tyrant. The opportunity Ezekiel is waiting for finally comes when Jesus brings Rick Grimes to meet him and passes on the information they have regarding the Saviors' strength and the location of their main base of operations.

During the war, Ezekiel starts a relationship with Michonne. Two years after the war against the Saviors ends, Ezekiel and Michonne break up, but Ezekiel is confident about starting their relationship again. However, he and 11 other people are decapitated by Alpha during the conflict with the Whisperers.

=== Television series ===
==== Backstory ====
Prior to the outbreak, Ezekiel was a zookeeper in D.C. as well as a stage actor. As a child, Ezekiel witnessed his father and grandmother suffer from and ultimately beat thyroid cancer. At some point he met Shiva, a tiger cub who was injured in her exhibit. Ezekiel cared for and befriended Shiva and formed a strong bond with her. When the walker outbreak began, Ezekiel returned to the zoo and freed Shiva with the two being together ever since. Ezekiel subsequently founded a community known as The Kingdom which grew to be a thriving community, lush with food and comfort. To better inspire his people, Ezekiel began referring to himself as King Ezekiel and took on the mannerisms of a benevolent and generous feudal king (going so far as to speak in Shakespearean tone and form). He also formed a court of advisers to help him manage The Kingdom which include seasoned survivor Richard, his personal attendant and bodyguard Jerry, and Benjamin, a young survivor who was the son of a good friend of Ezekiel's.

==== Season 7 ====
Ezekiel is first introduced to the series in the episode "The Well", when Morgan Jones and Carol are brought to the Kingdom by his people to give medical attention to Carol. When Carol awakens, Morgan introduces her to Ezekiel and his pet Bengal tiger Shiva. Ezekiel's quasi-Shakespearean manner of ruling leaves Carol quietly incredulous. When Ezekiel asks what she thinks of his sanctuary and him, she feigns enthusiasm (telling him, "It's amazing!"), and refuses his offer of fruit, stating that pomegranates aren't worth the trouble. Morgan, having swiftly gained Ezekiel's confidence, is taken out with Ezekiel's inner circle to perform a seemingly pointless task: herd a group of wild pigs into a barn far outside the Kingdom, where they feed on walkers. Ezekiel asks Morgan about his combat skills, as he sees Morgan is capable of using a staff, and asks him to train one of his men, Benjamin. After hesitating, Morgan agrees. Ezekiel brings Morgan and Benjamin to a secret meeting with the Saviors, who are given the walker-fed pigs, now slaughtered, as part of their tribute from the Kingdom. One of the Saviors, Jared, tells Richard the Saviors are letting the Kingdom off easy by taking only eight pigs, to which Richard replies: the Saviors are the ones being let off easy. Jared attacks Richard, and Ezekiel makes them break up the fight. The leader of the Saviors group tells Jared to stop only after Jared has hit Richard a few times. The Saviors leave and say they will want produce next time, or Richard will be the first to die. During the night, Carol is picking fruit as she prepares to leave town quietly, and Ezekiel catches her. He explains that he realized Carol's innocence was just an act but wonders how Carol could survive and wants to know where she originally came from. After a few moments, Ezekiel slowly drops his guard and reveals that he was a zookeeper and amateur actor. He tells her that he developed the "King Ezekiel" persona so that the people would have someone to follow and to emphasize that there is still good in the world. Carol still wishes to leave, so Ezekiel suggests that she go to live in the abandoned house she passed on the way to the Kingdom so that she can "go and not go". She agrees to this arrangement. Morgan takes Carol out to the house, tells her to take care of herself, and returns to the Kingdom. Later, she gets a visit from Ezekiel and Shiva. Ezekiel once again offers her a pomegranate, causing Carol to smile.

In the mid-season premiere "Rock in the Road", Ezekiel is shown to be friends with Hilltop scout Paul Rovia, aka "Jesus". Jesus introduces Ezekiel to Rick Grimes, the leader of Alexandria, another community forced to serve the Saviors. Rick implores Ezekiel to join their fight against the Saviors as only together can they succeed. Ezekiel takes the night to ponder his decision, but ultimately decides against open conflict with the Saviors as he refuses to endanger his people's lives. He does, however, allow Rick's friend Daryl Dixon to stay in the Kingdom to hide from the Saviors. Ezekiel appears in episode "New Best Friends" when the Saviors arrive for their offering. When Jared continues to insult Richard, the two draw guns on each other and Morgan and Ben are forced to stop further violence. Ezekiel later chastises Benjamin for acting hasty as violence must be reserved as a last resort. In the episode "Bury Me Here", Ezekiel, Morgan, Ben, Richard and several others find a roadblock en route to their meeting with the Saviors. They then find a grave reading bury me here with Ezekiel claiming that it is only luck that the world has not driven them all insane, though Ben credits Ezekiel with keeping them together. They arrive to find that their load of fruit is short of the required amount, causing Jared to shoot Ben. They bring him to Carol's, but despite their best efforts, Ben dies. When they meet the Saviors to settle their debt Morgan attacks and kills Richard, strangling him to death. He reveals that Richard discarded a fruit on purpose in an effort to start a war with the Saviors. Ezekiel is enraged at Richard's betrayal and shocked at Morgan's brutality (though he still attempts to bring him back). Carol later goes to the Kingdom and offers Ezekiel her condolences before stating that it is time to fight; Morgan, wishing to be alone, temporarily stays at Carol's house. Ezekiel agrees. In the season finale, "First Day of the Rest of Your Life", Ezekiel leads Carol and a group of Kingdom fighters to Alexandria to accept Rick's alliance. They encounter Morgan along the way, and Ezekiel convinces him to march with them. Ezekiel's arrival proves timely; their group arrives at Alexandria just as Negan is about to execute Carl. Ezekiel and Shiva charge into battle, killing numerous Saviors and helping drive off the Saviors. The episode ends with Ezekiel standing beside Rick and Maggie Greene as the Kingdom, Hilltop and Alexandria pledge to aid each other.

==== Season 8 ====
In the season premiere "Mercy", as Rick prepares for war against Negan, Ezekiel commits his own soldiers from the Kingdom, and provides rousing speeches to his men at Kingdom and later to the combined group prior to their first attack. After their initial assault on Sanctuary, resulting in a large walker horde that prevents the Saviors from leaving or entering, Rick's army breaks into several groups to attack other Savior strongholds. In the following episode, "The Damned", Ezekiel, alongside Carol, leads forces of Kingdom soldiers, clearing out all but one Savior at a stronghold. The solitary Savior escapes, but Ezekiel orders his group to give chase, fearing he will warn a nearby stronghold. With Shiva's help, the solitary Savior is stopped in time.

In the episode "Monsters", since they are close to another stronghold but still undetected, Ezekiel decides to launch an attack, despite not being in Rick's plan and against Carol's caution. The attack goes better than expected, with no losses to the Kingdom forces. As they are celebrating, Savior forces hidden in a nearby building fire on the group with a heavy machine gun, killing most of the Kingdom forces instantly; the few not yet hit rush to protect Ezekiel. In the episode "Some Guy", Ezekiel crawls out from the pile of corpses with a limp foot, aghast at the bodies around him that are starting to reanimate. Ultimately, he is saved by Jerry, who remains a loyal follower, and Carol, who dealt with the Savior attackers. They struggle towards the Kingdom, but Ezekiel is broken both physically and emotionally, and tells them to leave him behind, no longer worthy of being their king. Shiva arrives to fend off walkers that are about to attack Ezekiel, but the walkers eventually overwhelm the tiger, and Ezekiel can only look on in anguish as his companion is fed upon. The three eventually make it to Kingdom, and Ezekiel cannot say anything to the families of his soldiers, walking off in silence. In the episode "The King, the Widow, and Rick", Ezekiel has secluded himself in his home, refusing to see anybody. Carol is able to approach Ezekiel and tries to encourage him to take up leadership again, even if it is just maintaining his act, but Ezekiel remains reluctant to participate and urges her to lead the Kingdom. In the mid-season finale "How It's Gotta Be", when his community is invaded by the Saviors and they demand to know where Ezekiel is hiding, he allows himself to be caught soon afterwards, so his people may escape.

In the mid-season premiere, "Honor", Ezekiel is kidnapped by the Saviors commanded by Gavin, but their plans to take him to the Sanctuary are frustrated by Carol and Morgan, who manage to annihilate their followers and rescue Ezekiel. When Gavin flees, Morgan catches him, but Ezekiel, along with Carol, tries to convince Morgan not to kill him. Morgan insists he has to, but before he can, a fighting stick pierces Gavin's throat, killing him. Henry is revealed to be the killer, shocking Carol and Morgan. Ezekiel soothes Henry and tells him not to look at Gavin's body. Carol berates Henry for not staying behind and disobeying her, but Ezekiel assures Henry that everything will work out. "All will be resolved" he tells him. In the next episode, "Do Not Send Us Astray", Ezekiel and his community move to Hilltop to avoid retaliation from the Saviors. Henry wants to join the fight, but Ezekiel orders him to defend Hilltop from the inside. When Simon's convoy arrives, Daryl leads them through the gate. The people of Hilltop block the convoy with a bus, and Ezekiel and all open fire on the rescuers. The battle begins, and the rescuers succeed in lethally wounding several members of the militia with weapons contaminated with the blood of a walker. Ezekiel, Carol, Rosita, Tara, Maggie, Daryl, Enid, Jesus, Rick, Carol, and others are also wounded in the fight, but survive. They also manage to turn the tide of the attack of the rescuers as Simon and the remaining Saviors flee. Mayhem erupts at dawn inside the Barrington house in Hilltop, as many wounded succumb to the infection and die, because of the Saviors' contaminated weapons, begin to revive as walkers and attack. Ezekiel helps fight the walkers. Ezekiel shoots a reanimated Kevin, while Rick, Morgan, and Daryl shoot the remaining walkers. The next day, Ezekiel and Carol look for Henry, who had disappeared during the night. In the episode "Still Gotta Mean Something", Ezekiel asks Carol to help him find Henry, but she refuses. Ezekiel realizes that Carol believes that Henry is dead. Ezekiel accuses her of being a coward for thinking that and leaves. Later, Jerry rushes to Ezekiel to share the good news, just as Carol and Henry enter the community. Ezekiel hugs Henry and thanks Carol. Carol tells Ezekiel that he was right about her being afraid. In the season finale "Wrath" the combined forces mobilize to ambush the Saviors, Ezekiel predicts that it could be the last morning for some of them, Ezekiel accompanies Rick and the rest of the militia to fight the Saviors in the final battle. After most of the Saviors are eliminated due to Eugene's defective bullets, Ezekiel and the others fight the remaining Saviors until they surrender, shortly after Negan is defeated and captured while Rick addresses the crowd, declaring the peace among all the communities. Afterwards, Ezekiel returns home to the Kingdom.

==== Season 9 ====
In the season premiere, "A New Beginning", 18 months have elapsed. Ezekiel and Carol have grown as a couple and adopted Henry. Ezekiel joins an expedition to the city of Washington D.C. to find a wooden cart and agricultural machinery needed by the rescuers, and after finding everything they need in an abandoned museum, the king helps the rest of the group carefully move the car through a glass floor that contains a huge number of walkers underneath. Ezekiel falls in the last crossing as the glass floor is broken, but they are tied together with ropes, and Carol and others rescue him quickly from certain death. Carol and Ezekiel embrace, and later, the group goes back to their respective communities on their journey. On the way, Ezekiel proposes to Carol. She tells him to keep the ring and reminds him that she still does not want to be asked, especially on a horse. Ezekiel smiles and says he still loves her. The next day, Carol tells Ezekiel that she is staying in the Sanctuary. Ezekiel feels she is trying to stay away, but she denies it and kisses him before telling him to kiss Henry for her and instructs Jerry to take care of him as they move away.

In the second half of the season, Ezekiel struggles to reunite the fractured communities with a trade fair, while the Kingdom begins to fall apart from old age and disrepair. The situation worsens when a new enemy, the Whisperers, arises and Henry falls in love with Lydia, the daughter of the Whisperer leader. The new threat brings the communities back together. Though Michonne has developed a more isolationist mindset, she allows Alexandria to send a delegation, convinced by Judith Grimes to mend relationships with her old friends. At the same time, the Kingdom comes into contact with a new group, the Highwaymen, who try to extort the Kingdom for supplies. Instead, Ezekiel and Carol make a deal with the Highwaymen, who prove to be reasonable despite their rough start, to protect the area around the Kingdom in exchange for trade and getting to watch a movie using the Kingdom's recently repaired theater, something the Highwaymen have not been able to do for years.

In "The Calm Before," the communities are reunited at the Kingdom's trade fair, much to Ezekiel's pleasure. To cement their reestablished relationship, Ezekiel has the leaders of the four communities finally sign Michonne's charter, which had been recovered by Tara and given to Ezekiel after Michonne had given up on unity. Ezekiel and Carol invite Daryl, who has been living on his own in the woods since Rick's assumed death, to move to the Kingdom. However, the trade fair takes an ominous turn when it is infiltrated by Alpha, leader of the Whisperers, who Ezekiel unknowingly encounters and talks with. Alpha kidnaps and brutally murders ten people from the fair, including Henry.

In "The Storm," the Kingdom finally falls due to disrepair and disaster and Ezekiel and the other residents are forced to relocate to Hilltop during a severe blizzard. In the months since Henry's death, Ezekiel and Carol's marriage has fallen apart. After reaching Hilltop, Carol decides to end their marriage and return to Alexandria, though Ezekiel has her keep the ring he had given her.

==== Season 10 ====
Now living in Hilltop, Ezekiel struggles with the loss of the Kingdom and his divorce from Carol. Michonne later finds him suicidal, and they share a kiss, but don't take it further than that. Ezekiel eventually reveals a large lump on his neck to Siddiq, knowing that it is thyroid cancer which his family has a history of. While his father and grandmother successfully fought it off, Ezekiel is convinced that his condition is terminal in the current world which lacks modern medicine. However, he can't bring himself to tell Carol, getting off the radio when she comes on rather than admit that he is dying. After Siddiq is murdered by Dante, Ezekiel attends the funeral and is reunited with Carol, whom he considers telling about his condition but still can't go through with it.

Following the destruction of Hilltop, Ezekiel agrees to join Eugene's mission to meet Stephanie despite his deteriorating condition, wanting to do something good with what's left of his life. As Ezekiel grows increasingly ill, he becomes more despondent until a rousing speech by Yumiko and meeting Princess restore some of Ezekiel's good cheer. However, the group is captured and interrogated by the Commonwealth Army rather than meeting Stephanie.

==== Season 11 ====
The group is eventually granted admission into the Commonwealth where Ezekiel's condition improves somewhat after Lance Hornsby arranges for him to receive medical treatment, the Commonwealth having the modern medicine that Alexandria and the other communities lack. However, Ezekiel's prognosis remains poor without surgery to remove the tumor from his thyroid cancer which he won't get in time as Ezekiel is too far down the list. Ezekiel is assigned to work as the Commonwealth's animal control officer, a job that Ezekiel greatly enjoys. Carol eventually makes a deal with Lance where he arranges for Ezekiel to get the surgery in exchange for Carol doing favors for him. Ezekiel undergoes the surgery which is performed by Yumiko's long-lost brother Tomi who was a thoracic surgeon before the world ended. Ezekiel's cancer is successfully removed, and he later tells Carol that he has a good prognosis.

Ezekiel becomes disturbed by the class inequality that he witnesses during his cancer treatment and secretly opens a clinic for the disadvantaged to receive free medical treatment, eventually convincing Tomi to help him out. Ezekiel joins the effort to expose the Milton family's corruption and refuses to leave when the communities go their separate ways, wanting to try to save another Kingdom before it inevitably falls. After Sebastian's death, he and the others are made to disappear and sent to a forced labor camp. Negan approaches Ezekiel for help in leading a revolution against the sadistic Warden, aided by the fact that the camp that they've been sent to is at a Commonwealth-occupied Alexandria. Ezekiel, who has deliberately avoided Negan for years, reluctantly works with the former leader of the Saviors, eventually revealing that his hatred of Negan is of a personal nature due to the Saviors murdering Benjamin who was like a son to him. However, when Negan attempts to martyr himself for everyone else rather than exposing Ezekiel's role in the rebellion, Ezekiel comes to his defense, leading a number of the prisoners in making a stand. Ezekiel succeeds in convincing most of the Commonwealth soldiers to stand down while the Warden is subdued by Daryl, allowing the Coalition to retake Alexandria.

As everyone heads to the Commonwealth to take down Pamela, Ezekiel makes peace with Negan, recounting his various near-death experiences and deciding to let go of his bitterness. Instead, Ezekiel feels that Negan living to make something good of his life is a better way of dealing with his anger and grief. In turn, Negan reveals that he had attempted to sacrifice himself to save Ezekiel and the others out of unselfish motives. As a massive herd overruns the Commonwealth, Ezekiel rallies both his friends and General Mercer's loyal forces to fight for the Commonwealth, unwilling to give up on it. Together, they manage to overthrow Pamela and eliminate the herd, saving the Commonwealth.

A year later, with Pamela in prison for her crimes, Ezekiel becomes the new Governor of the Commonwealth with Mercer as his Lieutenant Governor.

== Development and reception ==
Ezekiel is portrayed by Khary Payton on The Walking Dead television series, beginning with the seventh season. Ezekiel and his pet tiger Shiva were introduced in the season seven trailer at San Diego Comic-Con in 2016.

Noel Murray of Rolling Stone ranked King Ezekiel 9th in a list of 30 best Walking Dead characters, saying, "Thanks to Khary Payton's theatrical flair, the general congeniality of "The Kingdom," and one seriously awesome pet tiger, this new leader offered a reminder that violence and selfishness aren't the only way to survive. Sometimes an overly polite nice guy pretending to be medieval royalty can stir up some loyalty too."
