= The Lost and the Plunderers =

- The Walking Dead episode
- Episode no.: Season 8 Episode 10
- Directed by: David Boyd
- Written by: Angela Kang; Channing Powell; Corey Reed
- Cinematography by: Paul Varrieur
- Editing by: Alan Cody
- Original air date: March 4, 2018
- Running time: 46 minutes

Guest appearances
- Sydney Park as Cyndie; Thomas Francis Murphy as Brion; Sabrina Gennarino as Tamiel; Briana Venskus as Beatrice; Nicole Barré as Kathy; Mimi Kirkland as Rachel; Mike Seal as Gary; Adam Fristoe as Dean; Aaron Farb as Norris; Matt Mangum as D.J.

Episode chronology
← Previous "Honor"	Next → "Dead or Alive Or"
- The Walking Dead season 8

"The Lost and the Plunderers" is the tenth episode of the eighth season of the post-apocalyptic horror television series The Walking Dead, which aired on AMC on March 4, 2018. It was written by Angela Kang, Channing Powell and Corey Reed, and directed by David Boyd.

== Plot ==
After burying Carl, Rick and Michonne gather their remaining supplies from Alexandria and abandon the community as walkers overrun it; Michonne tries to stop a fire from overtaking a gazebo Carl enjoyed, but Rick convinces her to let it go. On the road, Rick considers what Carl told him, and from his advice, heads to see Jadis and the Scavengers, who had witnessed what happened at the Saviors' Sanctuary.

Meanwhile, at the Sanctuary, Negan orders his men to seek out the Alexandria residents and instructs Simon to go to the Scavengers with his "standard offer," to kill one of them to bring the rest in line, reminding him that he values the people as resources to be saved otherwise. Just then, they receive a box sent by the Hilltop community with the message to "stand down", containing the reanimated body of Dean, one of Simon's men.

Elsewhere, Enid and Aaron are taken to the Oceanside community as prisoners for killing their leader, Natania. Natania's granddaughter Cyndie, after hearing Enid's pleas, decides to let the two live, but orders them to never return. Once escorted outside Oceanside, Aaron insists Enid get back to the Hilltop to let them know what happened, while he will try to go back to Oceanside and convince them to help.

Simon, not pleased with Negan's approach and knowing the Hilltop has the rest of his 38 men in captivity, goes to the Scavengers' junkyard and accuses Jadis of going back on their deal with the Saviors, but gives her Negan's offer of returning to the original terms of their deal and giving over all their guns. Jadis agrees, but Simon does not believe Jadis is showing enough remorse and kills her two lieutenants, Tamiel and Brion. She punches him, causing Simon to then order his men to kill the rest of the Scavengers. After, Simon reports back to Negan that all went well, though he spots paint on his shoe from the scuffle with Jadis.

By the time Rick and Michonne arrive at the junkyard, all of the Scavengers but Jadis have reanimated. They find Jadis alone, having dropped her aloof nature. She explains that she had been an artist before the outbreak, having used the junkyard for materials, but afterwards, she and the Scavengers saw the junkyard as a way to keep themselves isolated from the rest of the world while using the entire yard as their canvas. Rick blames the death of the Scavengers on Jadis for betraying them and siding with the Saviors. Tired of Jadis' double-crosses and deeming her useless now that her entire group is dead, he decides to abandon her as he and Michonne escape. Jadis begs to go with them but Rick fires a warning shot to scare her away. Jadis lures the remaining walkers into an industrial shredder to protect herself, crying as she watches her former friends be destroyed.

As they drive away, Rick explains to Michonne that he only fired a warning shot because he wanted her gone, not that he wanted her dead. Michonne believes that not wanting to kill people is what Carl was talking about before dying. Rick pulls over and takes a moment to stop and read Carl's letters by himself, including one written to Negan. Inclined to contact Negan over walkie-talkie, Rick decides to inform him that Carl is dead and that his son wrote a letter to Negan, asking him to stop fighting. Negan receives the news and is saddened, but Rick vows to keep fighting and kill Negan. Negan retorts that it was Rick's intense focus on his war with Negan that led to Carl's death and that Negan helps save people whereas Rick cannot. Negan tells Rick that Rick has failed as both a leader and father. He demands Rick to stop fighting and making decisions that will keep getting people killed, and to give up because he has already lost.

== Reception ==
=== Critical reception ===
The episode received generally positive reviews from critics. On Rotten Tomatoes, it holds an 81% with an average rating of 6.71 out of 10, based on 21 reviews. The site's consensus reads: ""The Lost and the Plunderers" takes a segmented approach to focus on individual characters—albeit with mixed results."

=== Ratings ===
The episode drew a total viewership of 6.82 million with a 2.9 rating in adults aged 18-49. This marked the series' lowest adults 18-49 rating since season one and its smallest audience since the season two episode "Judge, Jury, Executioner," which had 6.77 million viewers.
