= The First Day of the Rest of Your Life (The Walking Dead) =

- The Walking Dead episode
- In a flashback, Maggie Greene and Sasha Williams watch the sunrise. The episode details several flashbacks of Sasha to show her decision to sacrifice herself for the group.
- Episode no.: Season 7 Episode 16
- Directed by: Greg Nicotero
- Written by: Scott M. Gimple; Angela Kang; Matthew Negrete
- Cinematography by: Michael E. Satrazemis
- Editing by: Dan Liu
- Original air date: April 2, 2017
- Running time: 60 minutes

Guest appearances
- Khary Payton as King Ezekiel; Katelyn Nacon as Enid; Steven Ogg as Simon; Pollyanna McIntosh as Jadis; Thomas Francis Murphy as Brion; Jason Douglas as Tobin; Kenric Green as Scott; Michael Cudlitz as Abraham Ford; Jordan Woods-Robinson as Eric Raleigh; Cooper Andrews as Jerry; Carlos Navarro as Alvaro; Kerry Cahill as Dianne; Daniel Newman as Daniel; Elizabeth Ludlow as Arat; Mike Seal as Gary; Brian Stapf as Roy; Sabrina Gennarino as Tamiel; Dahlia Legault as Francine; Peter Zimmerman as Eduardo; Karen Ceesay as Bertie; Anja Akstin as Farron

Episode chronology
← Previous "Something They Need"	Next → "Mercy"
- The Walking Dead season 7

"The First Day of the Rest of Your Life" is the sixteenth and final episode of the seventh season of the post-apocalyptic horror television series The Walking Dead, which aired in the United States on AMC on April 2, 2017. The episode was written by Scott M. Gimple, Angela Kang, and Matthew Negrete, and directed by Greg Nicotero.

In the episode, Sasha Williams (Sonequa Martin-Green) comes to terms with the decision to commit suicide while in captivity, in order to kill Negan (Jeffrey Dean Morgan) as a walker. Brief flashbacks show her short-term relationship with Abraham Ford (Michael Cudlitz) and her friendship with Maggie Greene (Lauren Cohan) as a reason to sacrifice herself to protect her friends. The episode also includes the build-up to the following season's storylines.

This episode marked Martin-Green's final regular appearance in the series. Cudlitz reprised his role as Abraham in flashbacks. Khary Payton, Steven Ogg, Katelyn Nacon, and Pollyanna McIntosh reappeared as guest stars before being upgraded to series regulars for the eighth season. Dedicated in memory of Bernie Wrightson, the episode received positive reviews from critics.

== Plot ==
Sasha listens to an iPod in a casket in the back of a truck, struggling to maintain consciousness and has daydreams of her now-deceased boyfriend Abraham and friend Maggie.

At the Alexandria Safe-Zone, Rick and his allies question Dwight, a former member of the Saviors group, who warns them their leader Negan has captured Sasha and is preparing a major attack. Rick sends word to Jadis and the Scavengers that their help is needed.

At the Sanctuary, Sasha convinces Negan to kill only one Alexandrian instead of three for their transgressions and agrees to help in his plan. Negan has Sasha secured in a casket on a truck as the rest of the Saviors prepare to march. Eugene provides Sasha with an iPod and some water before the casket is closed. The Saviors encounter a roadblock set up by Dwight, giving time for the Alexandrians and Scavengers to take defensive positions. Before a fight can start, Jadis and the Scavengers turn their weapons on the Alexandrians, revealing that they double-crossed Rick's group after the Saviors approached them and offered them a better deal. Negan enters Alexandria and taunts Rick, before ordering Sasha's casket forward, saying that he will let Sasha live if Alexandria surrenders and turns over all its possessions. Rick demands to see Sasha, and Negan prepares to open the casket. A flashback shows Sasha took the suicide pill Eugene had given her the day before. Now a walker, Sasha attacks Negan, and the distraction allows the Alexandrians to fight against the Saviors and Scavengers. After subduing them, Negan prepares to kill Carl in front of Rick, but is stopped by the arrival of forces from the Kingdom and Hilltop, led by King Ezekiel and Maggie, who help successfully fend off the Saviors and Scavengers.

When the Saviors regroup at Sanctuary, Negan asks Eugene how Sasha could have died, and he suggests she may have died from suffocation in the casket. Negan remains doubtful but accepts the answer, and tells the Saviors to prepare for war. At Alexandria, the combined group mourn their losses, including Sasha's sacrifice. Daryl finds a note from Dwight, explaining that he was unaware of the Scavengers' betrayal. Rick, Maggie, and Ezekiel agree to combine their forces in the war against the Saviors.

== Production ==
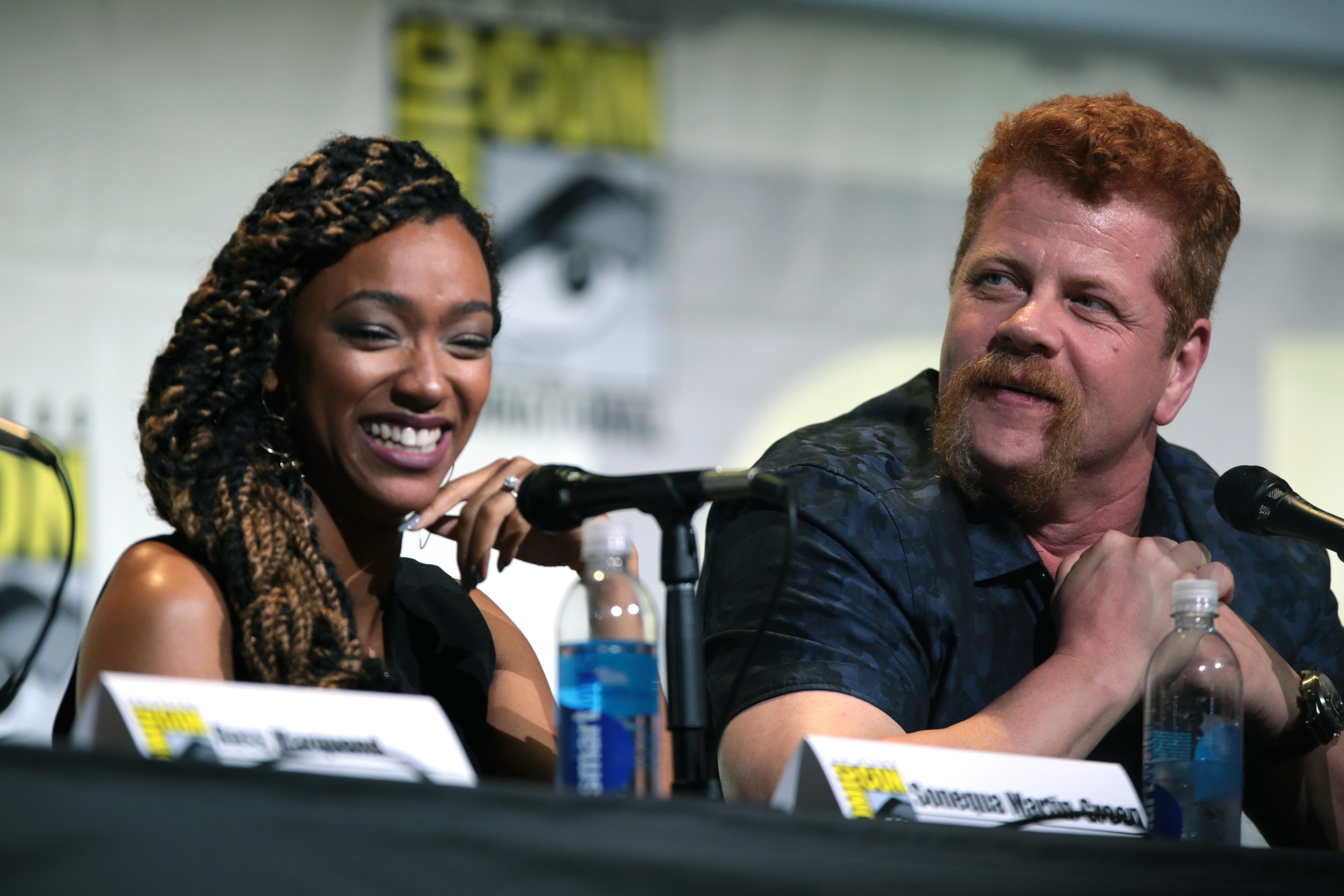
Sonequa Martin-Green (left) and Michael Cudlitz (right) made their final regular appearances in this episode.

The episode marks the last regular appearance of Michael Cudlitz as Abraham Ford and Sonequa Martin-Green's final regular appearance as Sasha Williams. Martin-Green explained Sasha's decision to sacrifice herself and felt that it was "right and complete". She said, "It was quite poetic [...] it was the perfect end to my story, the perfect culmination of my life. I felt like all of my roads had led to that moment [...] I was still going to fight because I had realized my purpose." Speculation had arisen over Martin-Green leaving the show to play the role of Michael Burnham on Star Trek: Discovery. However, she dismissed these claims. Martin-Green said she was aware of the death of Sasha for a while, though was unaware of the details "until a few weeks before." She said that writer Scott M. Gimple had told her Sasha's death would be "heroic and sacrificial and that it would be [the] perfect end to the story. He'd thought about it for a long time and had a vision of it for a very long time."

Although Sasha's brother, Tyreese, is not mentioned, Sasha's death serves as a parallel to her brother's death scene in the fifth season episode "What Happened and What's Going On". Both episodes begin with a flashforward of the deaths (although this is not known until the end) and feature re-appearances of dead characters, as well as the episode titles referencing time.

This episode was dedicated in memory of American comic artist Bernie Wrightson, who died on March 18, 2017.

== Reception ==
In its initial airing, "The First Day of the Rest of Your Life" was seen by 11.31 million total viewers. Additionally, it received a 5.4 rating in the key 18-49 demographic, making it the show's lowest-rated season finale since season two. The review aggregator website Rotten Tomatoes reported an approval rating of 83% with an average score of 7.5/10 based on 41 reviews. The website's critical consensus reads, "'The First Day of the Rest of Your Life' overcomes sporadic doldrums with an action-packed battle sequence, satisfying and innovative storytelling, and impressively imaginative use of a tiger."

Jeff Stone of IndieWire gave the episode a grade rating of a "B−", summarizing the season finale as being poorly paced, but having "enough thrills to get by." Kevin Fitzpatrick of Screen Crush gave the episode a positive review saying that it was a "strong finish to an otherwise uneven season". Blair Marnell of CraveOnline gave the episode a mixed review, stating that he felt the episode "gave Sasha a memorable send off [in] an interesting way. But it went on for far too long."

Stuart Jeffries of The Guardian called it "a satisfyingly gaudy ending", while Kevin Yeoman of Screen Rant felt the episode was "a drag" but assessed that Sasha's death served as the episode's highlight. Elise Nakhnikian of Slant Magazine was critical of the ending but praised Sasha's scenes. She assessed the ending as being "disappointing" and "so badly botched that it did little to change the balance of power, functioning mainly as a prolonged teaser for the battle that will follow."

Writing for Rolling Stone, Noel Murray gave the season finale positives notes for its climax and ending. Noam Cohen, from The New York Observer, gave a mixed review, stating that some scenes felt repetitive to previous episodes. Furthermore, the New York Daily News journalist Dan Gunderman found the opening sequences of the episode to be "slow out of the gate", but once the episode arrived to the climax, he said it was "chill-inducing TV". Lastly, from the Orlando Sentinel, Hal Boedeker wrote that "The First Day of the Rest of Your Life" gave viewers "memorable twists and an unforgettable sendoff".
