= Cooper Andrews =

American actor

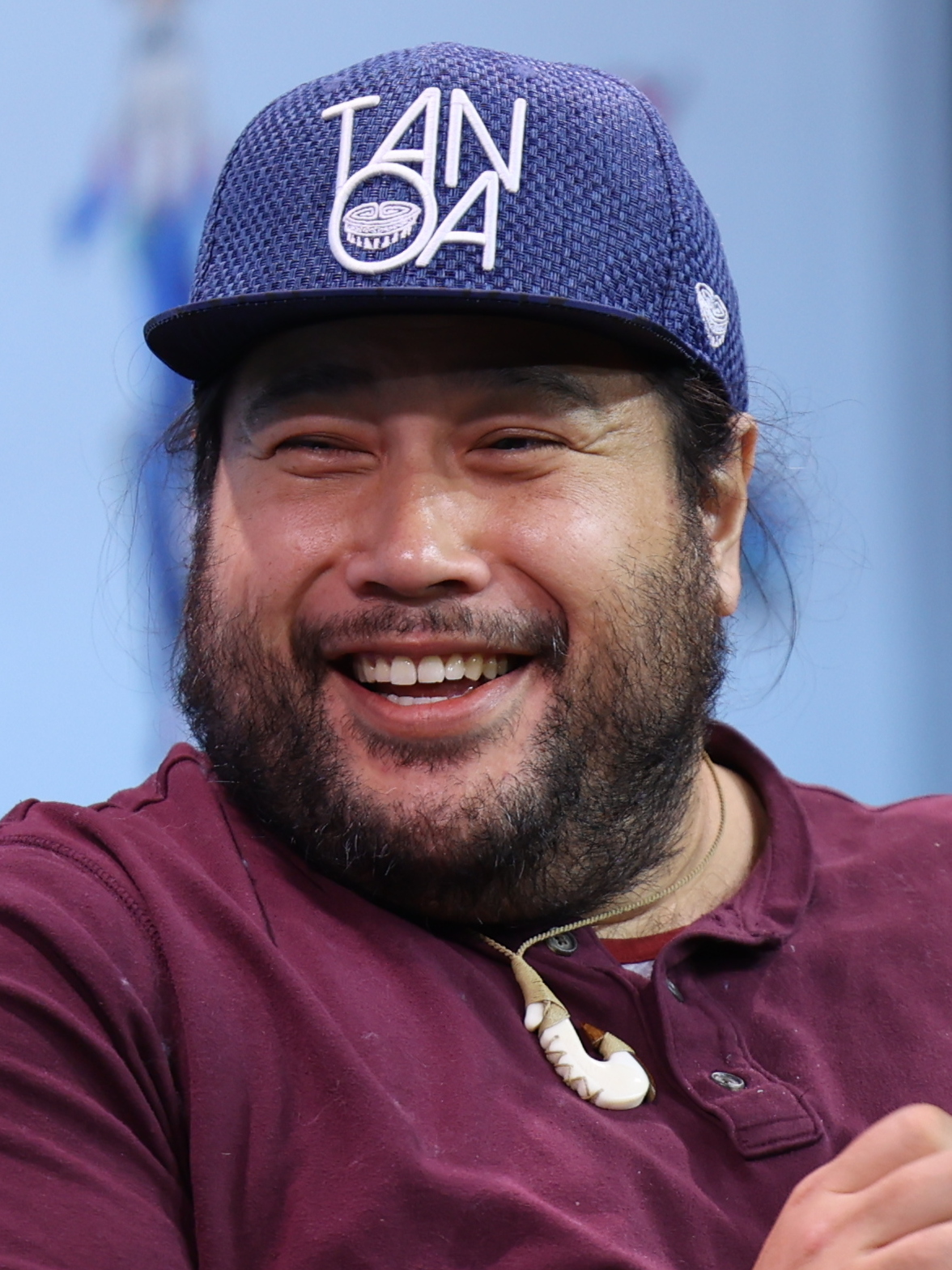
- Andrews at GalaxyCon Columbus in 2024
- Born: Andrew Lawrence Cooper; March 10, 1985 (age 41); Smithtown, Long Island, New York, U.S.
- Occupations: Actor, director, stunt coordinator, boom operator
- Years active: 2006–present
- Spouse: Abin Shim (m. 2019)

Andrew Lawrence Cooper (born March 10, 1985), known professionally as Cooper Andrews, is an American actor, boom operator, stunt coordinator and assistant director. He is best known for his role as Jerry on The Walking Dead. In 2019, he was cast as Víctor Vásquez in Shazam! (2019) and returned for its sequel (2023) in the DC Extended Universe.

== Early life ==
Andrews was born in Smithtown, New York on Long Island. His father is Samoan and his mother is of Hungarian Jewish descent. He grew up with his mother, and was raised Jewish. Andrews lived in Atlanta for many years and is a graduate of Dunwoody High School.

== Career ==
Andrews played the recurring character Yo-Yo Engberk in the first three seasons in AMC's Halt and Catch Fire. He went on to be cast as Jerry in The Walking Dead and in Shazam! as Victor Vásquez, a role which he reprised in its 2023 sequel Shazam! Fury of the Gods. Andrews has also worked behind the camera as boom operator, stunt coordinator and assistant director.

== Filmography ==
=== Film ===
Year	Title	Role	Notes	Reference(s)
2006	Death of Seasons	Guy		
2008	Golgotha	Evil Guard		
2008	Faceless	Catwalk BodyGuard	Short film	
2009	Mandie and the Secret Tunnel	Brother Cooper		
2014	Ruins and Reckoning	Kavick	Short film	
2015	Assassinmas XVII	Buckets	Short film	
2016	Billy Lynn's Long Halftime Walk	Grateful / Anxious American		
2018	Den of Thieves	Mack		
2019	Shazam!	Víctor Vásquez		
2019	Going Up	Roger Branch	Short film	
2019	Darlin'	Nurse Tony		
2023	Shazam! Fury of the Gods	Víctor Vásquez		
2023	The Last Butterflies	Dad	Also producer Short film	

=== Television ===
Year	Title	Role	Notes	Reference(s)
2014–2016	Halt and Catch Fire	Yo-Yo Engberk	17 episodes	
2015	The Red Road	Rowtag	2 episodes	
2015	Your Pretty Face Is Going to Hell	Modok	Episode: "New-cronomicon"	
2015	Limitless	Kenny Sumida	Episode: "Arm-aggedon"	
2016	Hawaii Five-0	Vance Pekelo	Episode: "Kanaka Hahai"	
2016–2022	The Walking Dead	Jerry	49 episodes	
2017	Thin Ice	Small Paul	Television film	
2017	S.W.A.T.	Reggie Lee	Episode: "Radical"	
2019	NCIS: Los Angeles	Matt Saplou	Episode: "Decoy"	
2021	Aquaman: King of Atlantis	Aquaman	3 episodes Voice	
2023	Hailey's On It!	Kai Banks	14 episodes Recurring; Voice	

=== Video games ===
Year	Title	Role	Notes	Reference(s)
2020	Madden 21	Fetu Valtal		
2023	Justice League: Cosmic Chaos	Aquaman		
