= What We Become (The Walking Dead) =

- The Walking Dead episode
- Episode no.: Season 10; Episode 13
- Directed by: Sharat Raju
- Written by: Vivian Tse
- Cinematography by: Duane Charles Manwiller
- Editing by: Jack Colwell
- Original air date: March 22, 2020
- Running time: 50 minutes

Guest appearances
- Kevin Carroll as Virgil; Eve Gordon as Celeste; Taylor Nichols as Jeremiah; Olivia Stambouliah as Lucy; Lindsley Register as Laura; Breeda Wool as Aiden; Andrew Bachelor as Bailey; Matt Mangum as DJ; Antony Azor as R.J. Grimes

Episode chronology
← Previous "Walk with Us"	Next → "Look at the Flowers"
- The Walking Dead season 10

"What We Become" is the thirteenth episode of the tenth season of the post-apocalyptic horror television series The Walking Dead, which aired on AMC on March 22, 2020. The episode was written by Vivian Tse and directed by Sharat Raju.

After the death of Siddiq (Avi Nash), Michonne (Danai Gurira) embarks on a trip to the island of Virgil (Kevin Carroll), to obtain weapons to defeat Alpha and the Whisperers, and help Virgil rejoin his family.

This episode features the return of Avi Nash as Siddiq, whose character was killed in the seventh episode of the tenth season, "Open Your Eyes". The episode also features the first appearance of Laurie Holden as Andrea Harrison since the season 3 episode "Welcome to the Tombs," and marks the final regular appearance of Danai Gurira (Michonne), who first appeared in the third season premiere episode "Seed." The episode also features archive footage of Andrew Lincoln (Rick Grimes), Chandler Riggs (Carl Grimes), Steven Yeun (Glenn Rhee), Lauren Cohan (Maggie Greene), Sonequa Martin-Green (Sasha Williams), Michael Cudlitz (Abraham Ford), Austin Amelio (Dwight), Steven Ogg (Simon), and more.

The second episode of The Walking Dead: The Ones Who Live picks up shortly after this episode ends and continues the story that the episode's ending set up.

== Plot ==
Michonne and Virgil use a boat to travel to Bloodsworth Island, an abandoned naval base where he claims his family and a stash of weapons can be found. Virgil soon admits his family is dead but are still reanimated as walkers, and he asks for Michonne's help to put them down. Michonne helps clear the base of walkers, finds Virgil's family who had hanged themselves within a cell, and helps Virgil to put them to rest and bury them. Virgil promises to lead Michonne to the weapons the next day.

That night, Michonne becomes impatient and tries to locate the weapons herself. While investigating in one of the buildings, she enters a room and hears the door slam shut behind her: a trap set by Virgil. Virgil's allies, trapped in an adjacent cell, warn Michonne that Virgil has gone insane since he inadvertently locked his family in the cell while they went scavenging, leading to their hanging.

Virgil feeds Michonne some drugged food, giving her hallucinations. In these sequences, she experiences visions of Siddiq, and then experiences hallucinations of an alternate version of her life, beginning with her deciding to ignore Andrea's cries for help, which led to her living on her own and eventually meeting Negan and joining the Saviors, becoming his right-hand woman then fighting against Rick and his allies, but eventually being killed by Daryl and Rick.

As the drugs wear off and Michonne regains her senses, Virgil offers her water, and she uses the opportunity to attack him. Virgil flees, leaving the door open behind him; Michonne helps the others out of their cell, and the four of them head to the docks but discover that Virgil set Michonne's boat aflame, leaving them stranded on the island. The four of them track down and capture Virgil; while his former allies want to kill him, Michonne shows mercy and is able to reason with Virgil and convinces him to help. Virgil shows Michonne a room full of scavenged gear, and she recognizes Rick's boots among the items. She demands to know where Virgil found them, and he takes her to a nearby beached military boat. The two of them board the vessel and, among other equipment, Michonne finds a cell phone etched with Rick's name and a drawing of her and Judith, along with a log book indicating Rick may be alive near New Jersey.

Michonne and the others plan to take the boat back to the mainland, but Virgil opts to stay on the island instead. While sailing back to the mainland, Michonne contacts Judith via walkie-talkie, telling her that Rick might be alive. Judith manages to convince Michonne not to return to Alexandria and to instead try to find Rick, which Michonne decides to do; the two of them promise to talk every day as she searches. Some time later, Michonne is walking through a forest when she comes upon two stragglers, who ask for her help catching up to a huge caravan moving north. Remembering Rick's initial kindness towards her, Michonne agrees to help them.

== Production and development ==
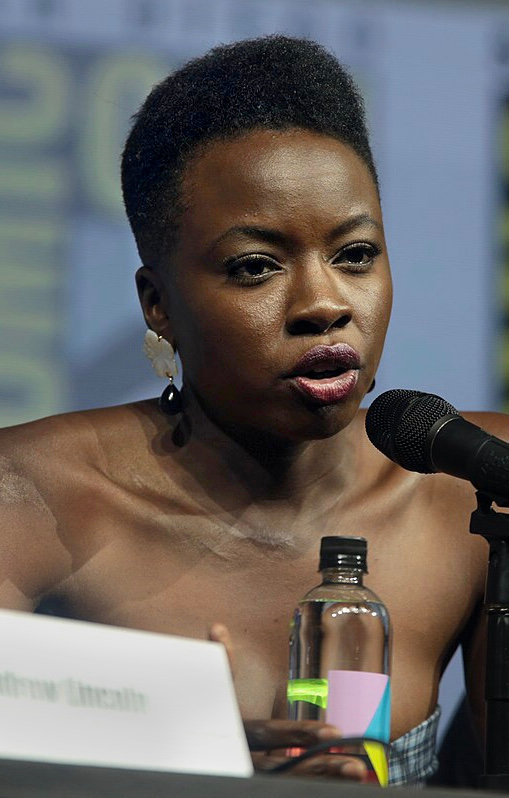
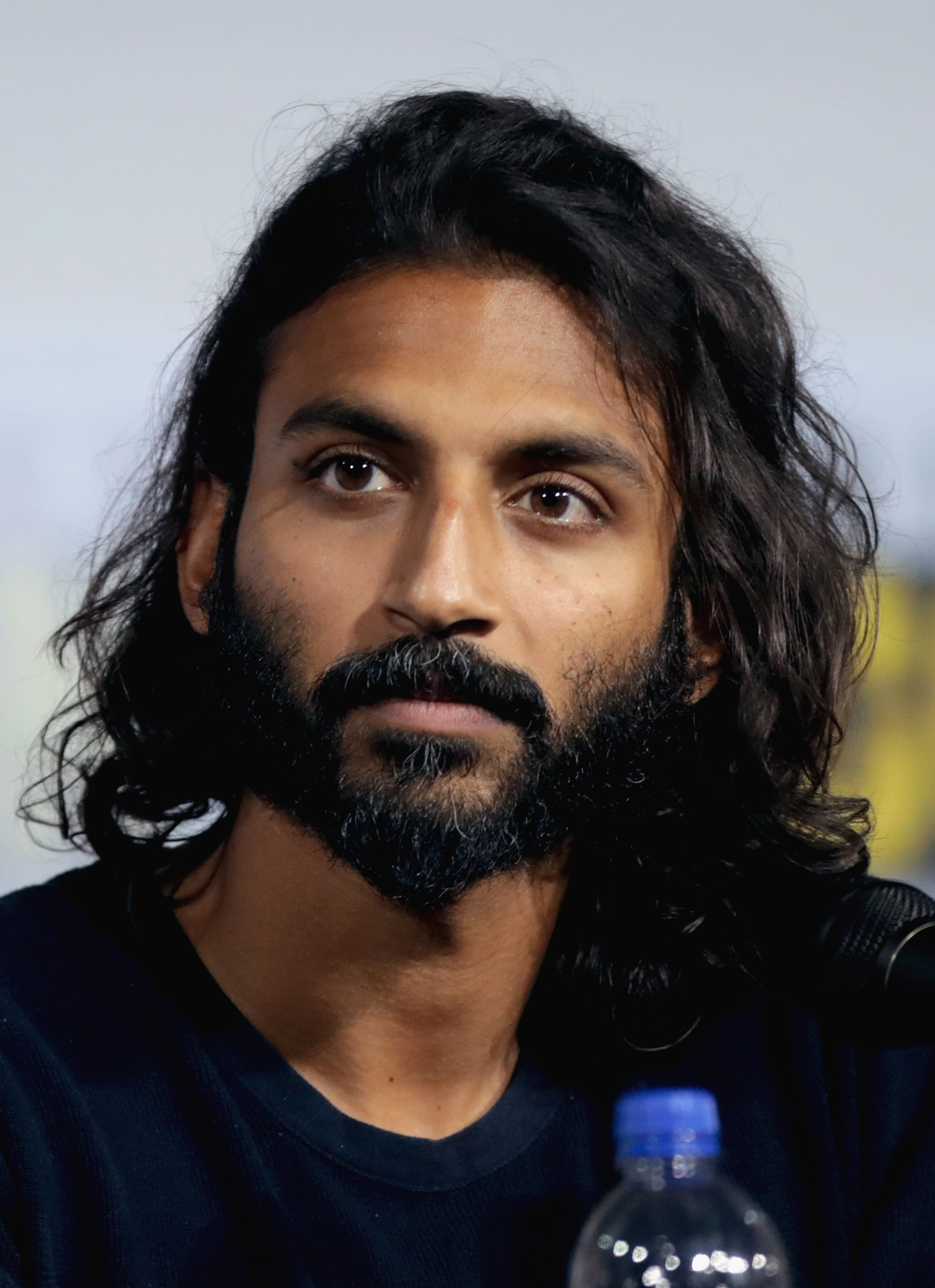
Danai Gurira (left) makes her final regular appearance on "What We Become" and Avi Nash (right) also makes his final appearance.

The episode marks the departure of Danai Gurira as Michonne. Gurira's departure from the series was announced in February 2019. In July 2019, Gurira confirmed her exit at a panel at San Diego Comic-Con, and stated:

I can confirm this is the last season I'll be on this amazing TV show as Michonne. I would just like to say this has been one of the purest joys in my life. I am very very thankful for the experience I've had in ways that I can't even express right now. My heart does not leave... it doesn't ever end, the connection between us never ends. It was a very difficult decision. It was about my calling and other things I feel called to... as a creator of work. All I'm filled with is a lot of pain about leaving and a lot of gratitude and to all of you. I love you guys. TWD family is forever.

During an interview with Dalton Ross writing for Entertainment Weekly, Gurira expressed her appreciation for the series and said:

It was very, very, very emotional. There was a lot of love. I received so much love, I was really blown back by how much love I received from everybody. When you receive all that love at the same time around your leaving, I was overwhelmed, and just beyond full of gratitude. And so you're dreading that last day, that last minute, that last frame, you're dreading it. That's it. And at the same time, there's so much beauty and love around it that you're able to just be in the moment with it. So it was great. It was beautiful. It was like leaving home. There's nothing quite like it.

Kirsten Acuna of Business Insider interviewing showrunner Angela Kang about Gurira's departure and Kang said:

One thing that emerged early on as feeling critically important to all of us on the writing side as well as Danai was the idea of concrete evidence of Rick’s presence and a direction to go in,” said Kang. “The boots are an iconic part of Rick’s costume, would’ve been on his person at the time of the bridge explosion, and would be immediately recognizable to Michonne, so that’s how we came to have this first clue.

Kang tells to The Hollywood Reporter about how the ending for Michonne's story came to life, and said:

The idea of her possibly joining the filmic universe was exciting for everyone. As Danai and Scott were having those conversations, similar to the ones with Andy about how he was going to transition out [of the series], I just needed the end point information, take that, and figure out how to craft a handoff as best as we can.

Avi Nash (Siddiq) returns in new footage in Michonne's hallucinations, the episode also marks the departure of Nash, who first appeared in the episode "Mercy" in the eighth season. Several former series regulars appear via archive footage within the hallucinations, including Andrew Lincoln (Rick Grimes), Chandler Riggs (Carl Grimes), Laurie Holden (Andrea), Steven Yeun (Glenn Rhee), Lauren Cohan (Maggie Greene), Sonequa Martin-Green (Sasha Williams), Michael Cudlitz (Abraham Ford), Austin Amelio (Dwight), and Steven Ogg (Simon). Archive footage from the episodes "Pretty Much Dead Already", "Beside the Dying Fire", "Hounded", "Not Tomorrow Yet", "Last Day on Earth" and "The Day Will Come When You Won't Be" is also shown, with some portions incorporating new footage of Michonne into previous episodes as part of a "what if" scenario; such as Michonne being part of the Saviors.

While Gurira departed the show, the episode's conclusion set up her return with the 6-episode spin off series that also starred Andrew Lincoln (Rick Grimes).

== Reception ==
=== Critical reception ===
"What We Become" received positive reviews. On Rotten Tomatoes, the episode has an approval rating of 83% with an average score of 7.6 out of 10, based on 18 reviews. The site's critical consensus reads: "Michonne is given an admirable, mostly successful departure from The Walking Dead as 'What We Become' delivers a series of fascinatingly trippy 'What If' scenarios from her past."

Alex McLevy writing for The A.V. Club gave the episode an A− and in his review he said: "All told, this was one of the most successful farewell episodes the series has done in years: a sharp look at one of its better characters, and a potent reminder of how much [Danai] Gurira will be missed".

Matt Fowler of IGN gave the episode a 9 out of 10 and wrote, "Despite the fact that Michonne's midseason finale choice to leave her friends and family felt rushed and wrong, "What We Become" was a stellar episode featuring a wickedly warped version of Michonne's life". Aaron Neuwirth of "We Live Entertainment" praised the episode and wrote: "The magic of the writing and direction of this episode is how it's able to accomplish a lot as far as looking back at Danai Gurira's years on the show".

Writing in his review for TV Fanatic, Paul Dailly praised the episode and wrote: "'What We Become' will go down as one of the best episodes of The Walking Dead. Ever. It brought Michonne's storyline to an ambiguous conclusion, and if that was indeed Gurira's last stand as the fan-favorite, then it was perfect."

Noetta Harjo of Geek Girl Authority praised the episode and wrote: "I did enjoy the "What If" scenerio [sic] because is [sic] shows how one [sic] choices in life can lead them on a different path. And it also shows that even when Rick's people were the good guys, they were the bad guys too".

=== Ratings ===
"What We Become" received 3.66 million viewers, up from the previous episode's rating.
