= Wrath (The Walking Dead) =

- The Walking Dead episode
- Episode no.: Season 8 Episode 16
- Directed by: Greg Nicotero
- Written by: Scott M. Gimple; Angela Kang; Matthew Negrete
- Cinematography by: Paul Varrieur
- Editing by: Alan Cody
- Original air date: April 14, 2018
- Running time: 47 minutes

Guest appearances
- Callan McAuliffe as Alden; Avi Nash as Siddiq; Cooper Andrews as Jerry; Sydney Park as Cyndie; Kenric Green as Scott; Joshua Mikel as Jared; Kerry Cahill as Dianne; Lindsley Register as Laura; Macsen Lintz as Henry; Karen Ceesay as Bertie; James Chen as Kal; Nadine Marissa as Nabila; Peter Zimmerman as Eduardo; Anthony Lopez as Oscar; Mandi Christine Kerr as Barbara; Nicole Barré as Kathy; Mimi Kirkland as Rachel; Elyse Nicole DuFour as Frankie; Chloe Aktas as Tanya; Autumn Dial as Amber; Traci Dinwiddie as Regina; Aaron Farb as Norris; Matt Mangum as D.J.; Colin Dennard as Lance; Stephen Shelton as Duke

Episode chronology
← Previous "Worth"	Next → "A New Beginning"
- The Walking Dead season 8

"Wrath" is the sixteenth and final episode of the eighth season of the post-apocalyptic horror television series The Walking Dead, which aired on AMC on April 14, 2018. It was written by Scott M. Gimple, Angela Kang and Matthew Negrete, and directed by Greg Nicotero.

This episode marks the last regular appearance of main cast member Lennie James as Morgan Jones, who first appeared in the first season premiere episode "Days Gone Bye". The character was moved to the companion series Fear the Walking Dead beginning with its fourth season. It also marks the final appearance of Austin Amelio, who played Dwight from the sixth season in the episode "Always Accountable" as a recurring member of the series and the following season was promoted to the regular cast. The fate of Dwight also marked the same path of Morgan for the crossover of Fear The Walking Dead as he made his debut for the fifth season as part of the main cast.

== Plot ==
At the Hilltop, Rick and company prepare to launch their offensive against the Saviors. In the midst of events, Rick has flashbacks to a day before the apocalypse that Carl alluded to in his last letter to him, in which a young Carl was leading him down a country road. Rick goes to tend to Gracie and encounters Siddiq. Rick asks how Carl was bitten; Siddiq tells him it happened while honoring Siddiq's mother, someone Carl never knew. Later, Rick, Michonne, Daryl, and Maggie review and prepare to depart to investigate the Savior plans that had been previously delivered by Gregory on behalf of Dwight. However, they are unaware that Negan planted these as a ruse to entrap them. Meanwhile, Morgan, starts hallucinating again and nearly kills Henry before Carol stops him.

Back at the Sanctuary, Eugene delivers and demonstrates his homemade ammo supply to Negan, and recommends that they use a firing line approach to fight Rick's army. Negan sends a decoy group of Saviors to set up a roadblock as part of the ruse to entrap Rick, while he, Gabriel, Eugene, and the rest of them set out on their real course. As they drive, Negan confesses to Gabriel that he intentionally sacrificed the roadblock group, knowing Rick will kill all of them, but that this was a necessary sacrifice as they were also armed with more false intel that would lead Rick's group into his ambush while thinking the plans from Dwight were legitimate. Gabriel, on hearing this, tries to escape the moving vehicle to warn Rick, but is caught by Eugene. Demiah Pantin then catches both of them in the forest, and turns them over.

Rick's group kills the roadblock as predicted, with Morgan killing a surrendering Savior in cold blood; Jesus later suggests that he should not kill the living so willingly. Following the map, Rick's group witnesses a massive walker horde in the distance and continue on. They end up in a large field where Negan taunts them over a PA system. Negan reveals that he has Gabriel at gunpoint, that their traitor Dwight is a prisoner, and that his people are ready to fire. He counts down from three, as a firing line of Saviors appears on the ridge line of the hill, ready to shoot down Rick's group. However, as they fire, their weapons all backfire due to Eugene's purposely faulty ammo, killing or injuring many – including Negan – and rendering the guns inoperable. As Rick's group engage in gun battle, Gabriel and Dwight overpower their captors and force Negan to flee with his baseball bat "Lucille". In the ensuing shootout, many of the Saviors are killed while the rest willingly put down their weapons and surrender.

Concurrently, a smaller Savior convoy reaches the Hilltop. The residents all evacuate through a secret passage to the woods behind the community. Tara and Alden stay behind to slow down the Saviors, when suddenly the Saviors are hit by molotov cocktails thrown by the Oceanside community, led by Cyndie and Aaron.

Back at the field, Rick pursues Negan to a tree where two stained glass windows hang; one of Rick's shots fractures one. Negan attacks Rick with Lucille; the two grapple until Negan gains the upper hand. He tells Rick that he wanted to kill him back when they first met, but could not do it in front of Carl. Rick says there can be another way and convinces Negan to hear him out for Carl's sake, that there could be a peaceful future for both of them. Negan seems to be listening and becomes tearful. With Negan's guard down, Rick uses a shard of broken glass to slice Negan's throat while the combined groups watch from a distance. Rick tells Siddiq to save him, much to Maggie's anguish; she wanted to see Negan dead for killing her husband, Glenn. Michonne restrains Maggie as Rick tells the gathered people that they will start a new world, living in peace, and that the walkers are the real enemies; stating that all the communities, including the Saviors, must work together in order to survive. As everyone departs, Rick falls against the tree and tearfully says to himself "My mercy prevails over my wrath" – a scene first shown in "Mercy".

Eventually, the survivors regroup back at their various communities. At the Hilltop, Alden tells Maggie he will stay and help build the inventions from the book given to Maggie by Georgie. The Oceanside group reintegrate and revitalize the Sanctuary. In exchange, a large amount of food and other supplies are given to Tara for the Hilltop. Dwight, whom Daryl has driven deep into the woods, profusely apologizes for his former actions but acknowledges to Daryl he deserves to die. Instead, Daryl gives him the keys to the truck and tells him to leave, but warns him to never return or he will be killed, and to go make it right and find his wife Sherry. Later, Dwight arrives at their old home and finds a recent note from Sherry. At the junkyard, Morgan stops to see Jadis and tells her that Rick has invited her to join their community and be part of a group again. Morgan says he will stay behind in the junkyard to be alone as he has decided he cannot be around people now.

Back in her office at the Hilltop, Maggie has a private meeting with Jesus and Daryl. They believe Rick and Michonne made a mistake by keeping Negan alive and the three allude to rectifying this once Hilltop has had time to regroup and fortify. In the infirmary, Rick and Michonne explain to a recovering Negan that he will spend the rest of his life in a cell while he watches their community thrive. At Alexandria, Gabriel returns to the burnt-out remains of the church and thanks God for helping him by showing him the light. Later, Rick reads his own letter back to Carl – saying he remembers that earlier day too and thanks him for leading him to this point.

== Production ==
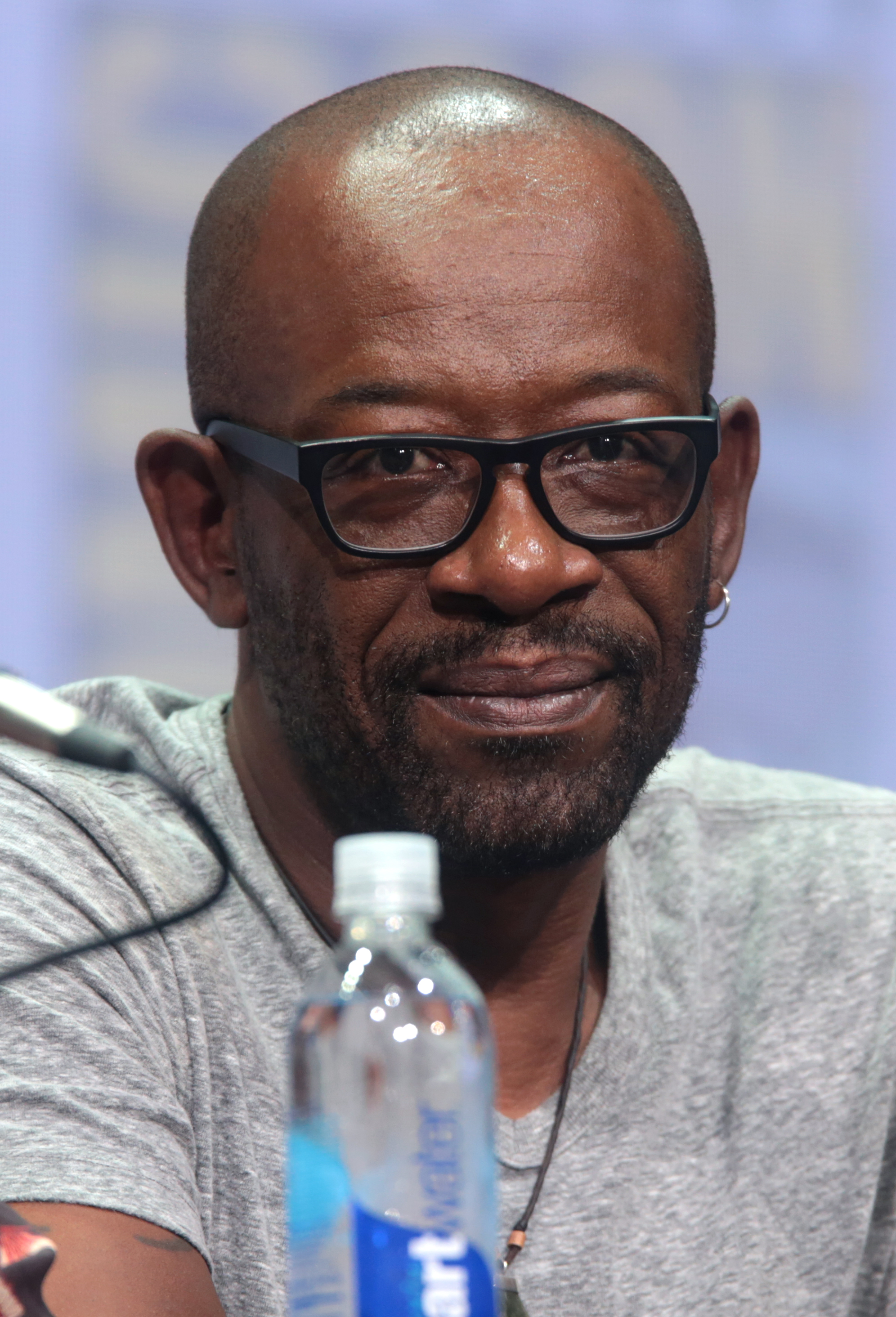
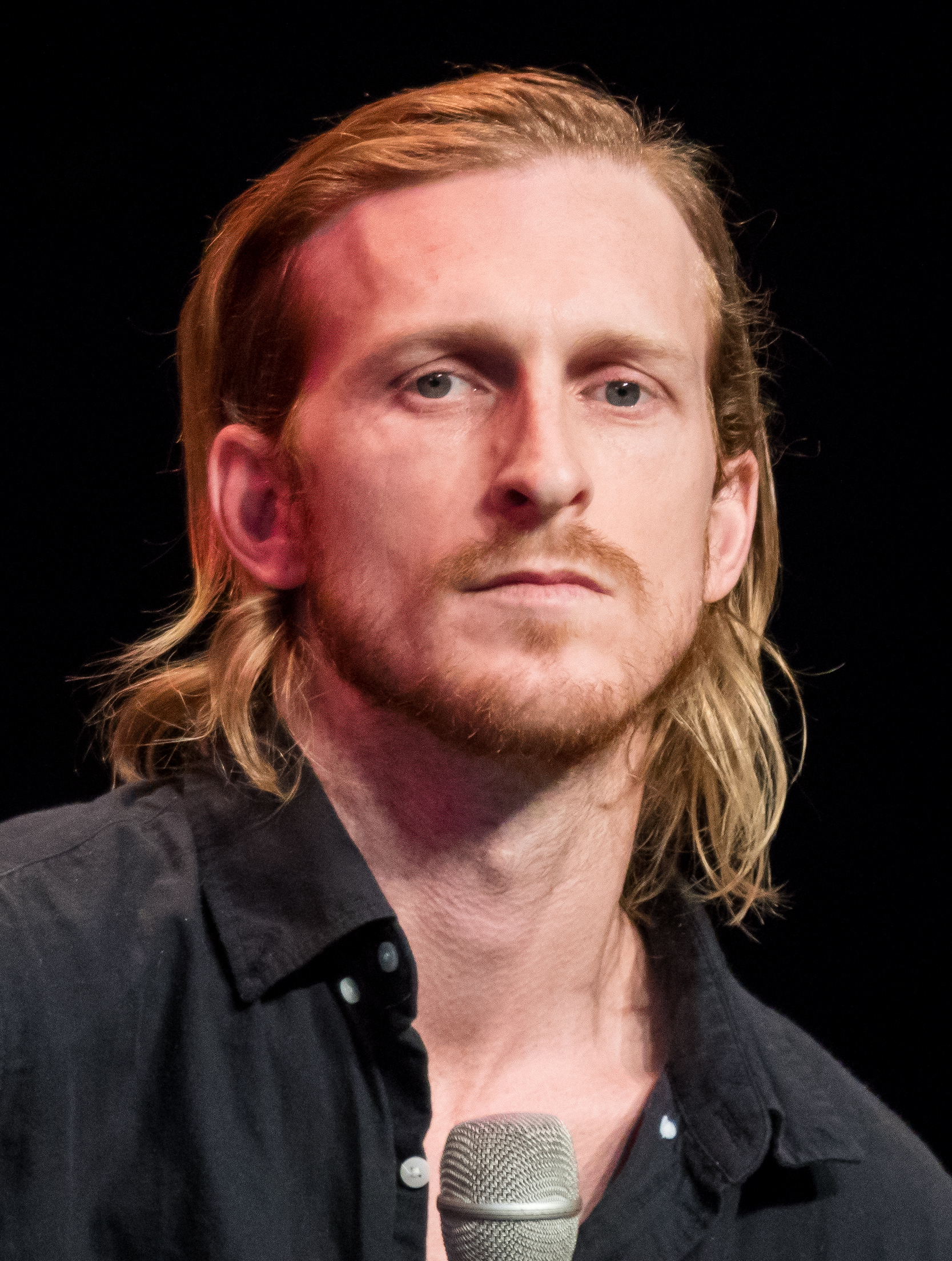
Lennie James (left) and Austin Amelio made their final regular appearances in "Wrath"

This episode features the departure of Morgan Jones, portrayed by Lennie James, as the character was about to be incorporated into the show's companion series, Fear the Walking Dead, where he became a regular character starting with its fourth season, which premiered immediately after the episode's broadcast.

According to showrunner Scott M. Gimple, the idea of having Eugene be critical to the end of the war by sabotaging the ammunition, which was not a narrative element of the comic series, had been devised before Eugene was taken by the Saviors and had not informed Josh McDermitt about it until necessary as to reflect the character's own motivations as a last-minute change of heart due to his humanity finally overcoming his instinct for self-preservation.

It also marks the departure of Dwight, played by Austin Amelio, who first appeared in season 6 "Always Accountable", became a recurring character and in season 7 was promoted to the regular cast. There has been speculation that Dwight was going to appear in the middle of season 9. Dustin Rowles of Uproxx wrote: "Should characters from The Walking Dead and Fear the Walking Dead come upon The Commonwealth around the same time, it's quite possible that Dwight could step right back into his The Walking Dead role, only now as a representative of Fear the Walking Dead. In this scenario, Daryl (filling the role of Rick) could be the one to pull the trigger and kill Dwight in that meeting with Governor Milton (or Georgie). However, Daryl — the guy who exiled Dwight from Alexandria — would feel much less remorse about killing Dwight than Rick does in the comics."

== Reception ==
=== Critical reception ===
"Wrath" received mostly positive reviews. On Rotten Tomatoes, it holds a 75% with an average rating of 6.95 out of 10, based on 28 reviews. The site's consensus reads: "Wrath" begins predictably and ends twistedly as it tidily closes out the "all-out-war" arc that's been creeping throughout TWD season 8, presenting a cliffhanger that goes against the grain of several lead characters and the series itself.

Nick Romano of Entertainment Weekly gave the episode a "B−" and said: "In the end, the hour comes down to only a few things: remembrance of Carl, the walk-up to the finale, the twist, and the aftermath — with the latter being saved for next season." Noel Murray of Rolling Stone commented on the episode: "The twist gets the story where it needs to go." Alex McLevy of The A.V. Club gave the episode a "B" and said: "The ending of this story means the series has a chance to do some firm rebooting next season." Matt Fowler of IGN rated the episode 7.6 out of 10 and commented: "There were a couple twists in the third act - one from the comics, that the show's been not shy about telegraphing, and the other one taking three character and having them act extremely contrary to how we know them to be."

Bill Keveney of USA Today commented on the episode: "The war, which dragged on longer than many viewers liked, turned on a surprising, satisfying plot twist." Steven Johnson of the Chicago Tribune commented on the episode: "All of Sunday's wrap-up material — Rick under the tree with the art glass windows hanging from it; Rick, red- and teary-eyed, intoning, "My mercy prevailed over my wrath" — packed a surprising emotional wallop." Dustin Rowles of Uproxx commented on the episode: "The season eight finale of The Walking Dead threw us all for a loop when Maggie teased her role in the future of the series."

=== Ratings ===
The season finale received a total viewership of 7.92 million with a 3.4 rating in adults aged 18–49, which was an increase from the previous week which had 6.67 million viewers, and was the highest-rated episode since the mid-season premiere, "Honor", which had 8.28 million viewers. However, it was also the show's lowest rated season finale since season one.
