= Eugene Porter =

- The Walking Dead character
- Eugene Porter, as portrayed by Josh McDermitt in the television series (left) and in the comic book series (right).
- First appearance: Comic: "Issue #53" (2008); Television: "Inmates" (2014)
- Last appearance: Comic: "Issue #193" (2019); Television: "Rest in Peace" (2022)
- Created by: Robert Kirkman; Charlie Adlard
- Adapted by: Scott M. Gimple; Matthew Negrete; Channing Powell
- Portrayed by: Josh McDermitt
- Voiced by: Josh McDermitt (Onslaught)

In-universe information
- Occupation: Comic: High school science teacher; Head of the Herd-Duty Crew; Head of the Ammo Crew; Head of the Western Railroad Construction Crew; Television: Engineer for the Alexandria Safe-Zone; Chief Engineer for the Sanctuary; Lieutenant of the Saviors; Head of the Bullet Factory Outpost; Biofuel Producer; Leader of his own group; School Teacher at the Commonwealth
- Family: Comic: Rosita Espinosa (ex-wife); Television: Maxxine Porter (wife); Rosie Porter (daughter); Michael Mercer (brother-in-law)
- Significant others: Comic: Stephanie (ex-girlfriend); Television: Shira (ex-girlfriend)

Dr. Eugene Porter (full name in the television series: Dr. Eugene Hermann Porter) is a fictional character from the comic book series The Walking Dead and is portrayed by Josh McDermitt beginning in the fourth season of the American television series of the same name. In both media he claims to be a scientist who knows the cure to the zombie plague and is being escorted to Washington, D.C. by Sgt. Abraham Ford and Rosita Espinosa, and encounter Rick Grimes and his group and recruit them to assist their mission.

Eugene possesses virtually no survival skills of his own and is extremely dependent on the group, but is highly intelligent and resourceful in using technology to ensure the group's survival. Eventually, it is revealed that Eugene is not a scientist, but a high school science teacher, and that he does not know how to cure the virus but lied to manipulate the other survivors into taking him to Washington, D.C., believing it to be the best chance for survival. This proves true as the group eventually finds the Alexandria Safe-Zone where Eugene becomes its primary engineer. Though his lie puts a strain on their friendship, Abraham eventually forgives him and they resume being friends.

== Appearances ==
=== Comic book series ===
Eugene Porter, as portrayed in the comic book series. Art by Charlie Adlard.

Eugene first appears at Hershel's farm, which is now occupied by the remaining prison survivors. Eugene claims to know what has caused the plague, but will not disclose any information with the remaining survivors, including Abraham and Rosita. He says he will only share information with officials in Washington, D.C. His lie, along with a belief that Washington is the only safezone, prompts the rest of the survivors to head there in hopes of long-term survival.

During the journey, Eugene studies various zombies in order to gain knowledge about them, but is careful to shadow the convoy to protect himself.

Eugene's deception is discovered after the Hunter ordeal. Everyone learns of his true career as a science teacher, and that he is using the radio as an excuse to get to Washington, D.C. He is hated by the group after this but remains a member, travelling with them to the Alexandria Safe-Zone, where he lives alone. After Rosita and Abraham break up, she moves in with Eugene, where he tries to create a relationship between them. Eugene eventually realizes he can begin to manufacture bullets in a repair shop nearby, where Abraham is killed when they scout it out only moments after they make amends. During the war with Negan, the shop is overrun by walkers and Eugene with his crew are captured by Negan. They are tortured for information but eventually escape with the help of Dwight, taking a van with a mix of Alexandrians and defecting Saviours back.

After the two-year time jump, Eugene and Rosita have a strained relationship. He works on many projects in the zone and is now a respected member of the community. It turns out Rosita is pregnant by another man but Eugene vows to raise the child like his own.

=== Television series ===
==== Season 4 ====
Eugene, Abraham and Rosita are introduced to Tara and Glenn in the episode "Inmates". Eugene claims to be a scientist with vital information to end the pandemic and needs to get to Washington D.C., having secured Abraham and Rosita's escort ("Claimed"). Tara and Glenn join them, and soon their group is reunited with Maggie, Sasha, and Bob ("Us"). Eugene convinces Abraham that they should join with this group as they make their way to Terminus for supplies and more recruits. However, the group becomes captives of the residents of Terminus when they arrive ("A").

==== Season 5 ====
Rick Grimes helps to save Eugene and the other captured group from Terminus ("No Sanctuary") and continue to make their way north, taking shelter in the former church run by Father Gabriel ("Strangers"). After a day, Abraham believes they must continue on, but Rick wants to wait for Daryl and Carol who had gone looking for Beth. Abraham's group is joined by Tara, Glenn, and Maggie as they take one of the church buses to drive north. ("Four Walls and a Roof"). During a stop, Eugene purposely sabotages the bus, admitting he fears being abandoned if he does not succeed in abolishing the epidemic. Abraham finds a fire truck that allows them to continue, until they run into a section of road that is overwhelmed by hundreds of walkers blocking their path. As the others try to figure out if they can go around, Eugene admits that he lied about being a scientist, having only used it to coerce Abraham into protecting him. Enraged, Abraham punches him, knocking Eugene out ("Self Help"). Once he recovers, the group decides to return to rejoin Rick's group, who had failed to save Beth after she had been kidnapped to Atlanta ("Crossed").

Some time later, the group is invited to join the Alexandria Safe Zone community, a suburban development protected by strong walls. Eugene helps with maintenance of the community, and goes with Glenn, Noah, Tara, Aiden, and Nicholas to get electronics supplies from a nearby warehouse. The inexperienced Alexandrians Aiden and Nicholas create more problems, leading Tara to be injured. While Glenn and Noah attempt to cover for them, Eugene helps to rescue Tara to their van, and fights off Nicholas who wants to try to ditch the others and flee back to Alexandria with the van. Glenn arrives to stop Nicholas in time ("Spend"). Back in Alexandria, while watching over Tara as she heals, Eugene and Abraham apologize to each other, and Eugene thanks Abraham for getting them to Alexandria ("Conquer").

==== Season 6 ====
In the season premiere, "First Time Again", Eugene is in the food pantry gathering food for himself when he overhears one Alexandrian, Carter, trying to convince Deanna's son Spencer, Tobin, Francine, and Olivia to help kill Rick and take back Alexandria from Rick as he believes they are becoming dangerous and power-hungry. Eugene drops a glass jar which alerts Carter of his presence. Carter approaches Eugene and says that he heard the plan before aiming his gun at Eugene. Eugene states that he didn't hear anything. He is almost killed by Carter, but is saved as Rick, Michonne, and newcomer Morgan Jones walk in on them and disarm Carter. In "JSS", Eugene meets Dr. Denise Cloyd, who is the new doctor after Pete's death. In "Heads Up", Eugene is seen attending Rosita's lesson on how to use a machete, but seems very distracted by the noise of the walkers outside. He admits that he's scared of dying; Rosita tells him that dying is easy and that watching friends die is much harder to bear. In the mid-season finale, "Start to Finish", Eugene is rescued by Tara and Rosita from the herd of walkers, seconds after hearing Daryl on the radio and letting out a cry of help. The three seek refuge and get trapped in a nearby garage. Later, Eugene uses his lock-picking skills to escape the room. They stumble into the same room where Owen is holding Denise captive, with Carol and Morgan unconscious on the floor. He forces them to surrender their weapons and Eugene watches as the Wolf leaves the house, taking Denise with him. In the mid-season premiere "No Way Out", Eugene helps kill the remaining herd, showing his growing acts of bravery.

In the episode "Twice as Far", Eugene now goes on patrols with Abraham. He calls himself a survivor now. Eugene is furious after Abraham does not allow him to kill a walker and tells Abraham he no longer needs his protection and has outlived his usefulness to him. Abraham leaves and tells Eugene to find his own way home. After Denise is killed by Dwight, it is revealed that he and his men have captured Eugene. Dwight demands that he, Daryl and Rosita take them back to Alexandria and if they do not oblige, he will kill them. Eugene spots Abraham hiding behind oil barrels nearby and insists that they should kill him first. Dwight orders one of his men to investigate, and while he is distracted Eugene turns and bites his crotch. Abraham uses the distraction to shoot two Saviors, and Daryl and Rosita are able to retrieve their guns. Dwight manages to break free from Eugene, who is hit during the shootout. As Dwight and the remaining Saviors flee, Abraham, Rosita and Daryl carry Eugene back to Alexandria. Abraham reconciles with Eugene at home. In the season finale "Last Day on Earth", Eugene accompanies a small group to bring an ill Maggie to the Hilltop. The Saviors beat up Eugene as well as capturing him and trapping the group and then afterwards, Negan kills one of them after a twisted variation of the game, Eeny, meeny, miny, moe.

==== Season 7 ====
Eugene and the others are forced to witness Negan kill Abraham and later Glenn before they are let go, but told to expect the Saviors to arrive at Alexandria for a portion of their supplies ("The Day Will Come When You Won't Be"). After Rosita berates Eugene for being a coward, Eugene discovers a nearby metalworking shop and constructs a single bullet, which he gives to her ("Sing Me a Song"). Negan and the Saviors arrive and start taking supplies, including ammunition. An altercation between Negan and Spencer leads to Negan killing him; in anger, Rosita fires Eugene's bullet at Negan, but only striking his bat. Negan prepares to have the Saviors kill Rosita, but Eugene steps forward and claims responsibility for making the bullet. Seeing the potential for his skills, Negan takes Eugene with the Saviors when they depart ("Hearts Still Beating"). At the Saviors' Sanctuary, Eugene claims he is a scientist and provides advice about dealing with walkers to Negan. Negan takes a liking to Eugene for this, as well as Eugene's willingness to submit to him, and makes him one of his lieutenants, giving him additional comforts and benefits ("Hostiles and Calamities"). Sasha and Rosita secretly arrive to try to kill Negan and rescue Eugene, but Eugene refuses to leave, and as a result, Sasha is captured ("Something They Need"). Eugene visits Sasha in captivity to try to convince her to join Negan, but Sasha flatly refuses, and insists instead Eugene bring her a weapon to use against Negan. He comes back later and secretly slips her a poison capsule ("Something They Need"). Knowing that Negan plans to bring Sasha to Alexandria in a coffin in order to kill her in front of Rick's group as payback for the death of one of his men, Eugene finds a music player to give to Sasha during transit. At Alexandria, when Negan goes to open the cabinet, a reanimated Sasha attacks him; Eugene realizes that Sasha had used the poison pill to commit suicide so she could attack Negan as a walker. The surprise causes chaos that eventually allows the Alexandrians with the other communities to ward off the Saviors' attack, and Negan, Eugene, and the other Saviors retreat. Back at Sanctuary, Eugene claims to have no idea how Sasha died in transit ("The First Day of the Rest of Your Lives").

==== Season 8 ====
Eugene appears as one of Negan's lieutenants in "Mercy," but is essentially ignored by Rick beyond a brief acknowledgment when Rick tries to negotiate with the lieutenants. Along with the rest of the Saviors, he is trapped in the Sanctuary by the herd the Militia lures there.

In "The Big Scary U," Eugene acts as part of the council trying to decide how to deal with the siege. Eugene disagrees with Simon's amoral plans for escape, backed up by Dwight. As a result, Eugene thanks Dwight for his help privately. Eugene later realizes that Dwight is the traitor in the Sanctuary helping Rick's group. After Gabriel is brought in as a prisoner, Eugene attempts to bring him food and discovers that Gabriel is deathly ill. Gabriel asks for Eugene's help in rescuing Doctor Harlan Carson from the Sanctuary so that Doctor Carson can aid Maggie in her pregnancy. In "Time for After," Eugene confronts Dwight about his betrayal. Though Dwight admits to it, he insists that all Eugene needs to do is let things play out as Rick only wishes Negan dead and is trying to force everyone else to surrender. Eugene is shown to have conflicted loyalties, drinking heavily and contemplating the seriously ill Gabriel's request to help rescue Doctor Carson. Eugene eventually comes up with a plan to lure the walkers away using the music player he gave Sasha, but is foiled by Dwight. Shortly afterwards, Daryl and Tara crash a garbage truck into the Sanctuary flooding it with walkers. Eugene refuses to help Gabriel, stating that he is now out only for himself. Eugene presents a plan to defeat the herd to Negan, but stops short of exposing Dwight's treachery.

In the mid-season finale "How It's Gotta Be," it is revealed that Eugene has found a way to clear the Sanctuary of walkers, allowing the Saviors to retaliate against Alexandria, the Hilltop and the Kingdom. Eugene continues to struggle with his conscience, drinking heavily to numb the guilt. Finally, Eugene decides to help Gabriel and Dr. Carson escape despite the likelihood that it will result in Gabriel's death due to his condition. Eugene discreetly disables one of the gate guards and leaves a vehicle for Gabriel and Carson to use that he "accidentally" drops the keys to before leaving the two. Though Gabriel requests that Eugene return with them, Eugene refuses.

In the mid-season premiere "Honor" in Carl's envisioned future, Eugene is tending the gardens in Alexandria and offers Judith a green apple. In "Dead or Alive Or", Eugene is questioned by Negan, who is unaware that Eugene helped two of his captives escape. A nervous Eugene inquires about the events that occurred at Alexandria, Negan questions his loyalty and sending him to his own outpost in a bullet factory to create ammunition for war.

In the finale, "Wrath", Eugene is seen showing Negan the ammunition he manufactured, with Negan congratulating him. Later on in the episode, when the Saviors surround Rick's group on top of a hill, most of their weapons blow up in their faces instead of firing, with Negan trying to kill Eugene when he realises that he purposefully botched the production process, but failing when Dwight and Gabriel overpower him, forcing him to flee.

==== Season 9 ====
Before Rick Grimes's presumed death and the timeskip thereafter, Eugene is shown to be running the reformed sanctuary, though some saviors are still loyal to Negan. He also works on the bridge, and is there when it explodes.

After the timeskip, in "Who Are You Now", Eugene is one of the people to come across Magna's group and is shown to be more confident and has become a part of Alexandria. He also notices Rosita's affection for Gabriel. Later on, he is working on a radio project and travels out to a water tower with Rosita, but they lose their horses and have to flee on foot when a herd arrives, which is later revealed to be The Whisperers when they hear the dead talking to each other.

In "Evolution", Eugene is found hiding underneath the floor of a barn by Daryl, Aaron and Jesus after Rosita escapes back to Alexandria and tells them about what happened. He is there when Jesus is killed, blaming himself, as well as when they capture Lydia. After attending Jesus's funeral, he returns to Alexandria.

In "Scars", he is part of the group that finds the children in the flashback, and also helps Michonne after the betrayal by Jocelyn. In "The Calm Before" he attends the festival in The Kingdom. In "The Storm" he helps keep the group with Negan, Judith and Gabriel safe, and saves two people's lives by noticing the fireplace is about to explode.

==== Season 10 ====
In "Lines We Cross", Eugene is shown to have successfully set up communication with the other communities. He also helps raise Rosita and Siddiq's daughter, Coco. When the satellite falls, he is one of the people to help douse the fire and convinces Michonne to let him harvest the satellite for parts. Later, in "Ghosts", he is yelled at by Rosita for acting like he is Coco's father, and admits to her that he thought of their relationship as a means to achieve a romantic relationship between them. When visiting Hilltop in "Silence The Whisperers", he helps to defend and rebuild the community from a wave of walkers caused by a breach in the wall.

In "Bonds", still in Hilltop, he finishes building a long distance radio, and catches up with Rosita, slightly fixing their relationship. Later on, he calls out on the airwaves with no hope of actually reaching someone but is surprised when a woman answers, with them both being excited but wary, and bonding over shared experiences of a train festival but not sharing information on their communities. Later, in "The World Before", he visits Alexandria to pick up his belongings to take to Hilltop, attending Siddiq's funeral and talking more with Rosita while there.

In "Morning Star", Eugene and the woman, who reveals herself to be called Stephanie, are talking, when they both realize they are close enough to see the same satellites fall. After Eugene leaves, Rosita enters while Stephanie is still there, causing Stephanie to go silent despite Eugene's pleas, as they had agreed to keep it secret on both sides. Later, as everyone else is equipping to fight the Whisperer's herd, Eugene tries to reach her by singing the Iron Maiden song When The Wild Wind Blows, with it succeeding and Stephanie returning and telling Eugene to meet her in a train yard in Charleston, West Virginia.

Following the destruction of the Hilltop, Eugene leads Ezekiel, Yumiko and Princess to meet with Stephanie. However, upon arriving at the meeting location after some mishaps, the group is captured and interrogated by the Commonwealth Army.

==== Season 11 ====
After being allowed into the Commonwealth, Eugene begins a romantic relationship with the woman introducing herself as Stephanie, but finds himself caught up the machinations of the Commonwealth's Governor, Pamela Milton, and her right-hand man, Lance Hornsby. Eugene is eventually forced to lead the Commonwealth Army to Alexandria after an altercation with Milton's son Sebastian, arriving just in time to deliver vital food and rebuilding supplies for the community. After Alexandria joins up with the Commonwealth, Eugene permanently moves to the Commonwealth, becomes a schoolteacher, and writes a manuscript about Stephanie.

One day, Stephanie suddenly vanishes and Eugene begins an investigation, eventually discovering a rogue element within the Commonwealth led by Hornsby, who seeks power for himself. "Stephanie" turns out to be one of Hornsby's spies, Shira, who was assigned to seduce Eugene in order to find his community so as to further Hornsby's plans. Hornsby manipulates and shames Eugene into keeping quiet about his discoveries and Eugene burns his manuscript. However, shortly thereafter, Eugene finally meets the real Stephanie who turns out to be Milton's assistant Max Mercer. Max explains that her communications with Eugene had gotten intercepted, although her brother, General Michael Mercer, had kept Max from being discovered, resulting in her being unable to meet Eugene as promised. After some initial hesitation on both sides, Eugene and Max start a romantic relationship and become embroiled in the plan to sow dissent against Pamela.

As the communities prepare to go their separate ways, Eugene agrees to help Max expose the Miltons by conspiring to publicly play a recording that Max had made of Sebastian mocking the people of the Commonwealth. However, this stunt coincides with an attack by several reanimated Commonwealth janitors, murdered by Hornsby's forces, attacks a public festival. An enraged Sebastian tries to feed Max to a walker, but Eugene throws the walker off of her. However, the walker lands on Sebastian and kills him before Judith puts it down. As a result, Eugene becomes a wanted fugitive, hunted for the murder of Sebastian. Eugene eventually turns himself in and confesses, but lies that he had acted alone so as to protect Max.

Eugene is put on trial for Sebastian's murder, although Milton rigs the trial against him, while arresting his friends disappear and blackmailing Yumiko into prosecuting him. Although resigned to his fate, Eugene urges Yumiko not to lose faith in their friends or herself, and she decides to act as Eugene's defense attorney. Eugene and Yumiko use the trial to further expose Milton's corruption and reach out to the lower classes. At the end of the trial, Eugene makes a speech admitting to his faults, and urging the people to stand up to Milton. Although Eugene is sentenced to die, he is broken out by General Mercer and some of his troops, who are rebelling against Milton.

As a horde overruns the Commonwealth, Eugene reunites with his friends and helps Rosita to rescue her daughter. However, he is devastated to find that she has been bitten. Eugene helps to overthrow Milton and to destroy the horde. In the aftermath, Eugene confesses his love for Rosita and is at her bedside as she dies.

A year later, Eugene continues to reside in the Commonwealth which is now led by Ezekiel. During this time, Eugene has married Max and they have had a daughter named Rosie together.

== Casting ==
The Eugene character was announced in a casting call for Episode 10 in July 2013, under code-name "Wayne Kasey". The character's real name and the actor who would play the role (McDermitt) were confirmed during the show's panel at New York Comic Con 2013. The Hollywood Reporter and other media publicized the confirmation afterwards.

== Critical reception ==
Writing for IGN, Dan Phillips praised Eugene's introduction in Issue #53.

Noel Murray of Rolling Stone ranked Eugene Porter 12th in a list of 30 best Walking Dead characters, saying, "Since admitting that he can't cure zombie-ism, the former high school science teacher has become determined to earn others' loyalty for real, and his tentative steps toward confidence and courage have been inspiring to watch. Plus any actor who can rock a mullet like Josh McDermitt is a-ok in our book."
