= Dead or Alive Or =

- The Walking Dead episode
- Episode no.: Season 8 Episode 11
- Directed by: Michael E. Satrazemis
- Written by: Eddie Guzelian
- Cinematography by: Stephen Campbell
- Editing by: Evan Schrodek
- Original air date: March 11, 2018
- Running time: 46 minutes

Guest appearances
- Callan McAuliffe as Alden; Cooper Andrews as Jerry; Avi Nash as Siddiq; Jason Douglas as Tobin; Kenric Green as Scott; Joshua Mikel as Jared; R. Keith Harris as Harlan Carson; Jon Eyez as Potter; Kerry Cahill as Dianne; Macsen Lintz as Henry; Nadine Marissa as Nabila; James Chen as Kal; Peter Zimmerman as Eduardo; Karen Ceesay as Bertie; Anthony Lopez as Oscar; Jason Burkey as Kevin; Mandi Christine Kerr as Barbara; Ted Huckabee as Bruce; Elyse Nicole DuFour as Frankie; José Michael Vasquez as José; Scott Deckert as John; Dan Johnson as Derek; Courtney Patterson as Mel; CC Castillo as Savior #6; Chad Joyce as Savior #7

Episode chronology
← Previous "The Lost and the Plunderers"	Next → "The Key"
- The Walking Dead season 8

"Dead or Alive Or" is the eleventh episode of the eighth season of the post-apocalyptic horror television series The Walking Dead, which aired on AMC on March 11, 2018. It was written by Eddie Guzelian and directed by Michael E. Satrazemis.

== Plot ==
Daryl, aided by Rosita, Tara, and Siddiq, leads the survivors from the destroyed Alexandria Safe-Zone toward the Hilltop while avoiding Savior patrols who are under orders to seek them out by Negan. Dwight, a former Savior that has helped the Alexandrians, guides them using his knowledge of the area, but most remain cautious of his advice, since he was previously a member of the Saviors.

Elsewhere, Dr. Harlan Carson helps the ill Gabriel to escape the Saviors' Sanctuary, but Gabriel's fever, which affects his eyesight, makes them lose their way. Gabriel relies on his faith in God against Dr. Carson's advice, leading them to an abandoned house where they happen to find antibiotics to treat Gabriel's fever. But he will still likely go blind without additional help. After accidentally breaking open a piggy bank, they discover car keys and a map to Hilltop (when it was a museum).

Daryl's group come to find the safest route is to cross through a swamp, and Daryl puts Tara in charge of protecting the survivors while he, Rosita, and Siddiq kill the many walkers half-submerged in the swamp. Tara sees some walkers a distance away, and convinces Dwight to help, but this is a ruse to get him away from the group and kill him. Dwight pleads for her to let him go, apologizing for killing her girlfriend, Denise, but she fires a shot and he runs off. However, as she catches up to him, they see a group of Saviors approaching. As the Saviors come closer to where they are hiding, and with Tara's gun pointed at Dwight, he quickly walks out of the brush and approaches the group, acting as if he managed to escape and reunite with the Saviors. He then draws the patrol away from the Alexandria group, telling them that no Alexandrians could be in the swamp area, since he'd just come from there. When Tara returns to the group, Daryl scolds her, fearing Dwight could tell Negan everything, but Tara explains that she now trusts Dwight, and that he would not do so.

At the Hilltop, Morgan and Carol deal with Henry's lack of remorse after murdering Gavin, while Maggie reviews the state of their resources, knowing that with their Savior prisoners along with Gregory, they do not have enough supplies to last, and so she considers cutting them off. Daryl's group then makes it to the Hilltop, where news of Carl's death wracks the community, particularly Enid. Maggie decides to allow the Saviors to have limited rations and supervised time outside of their cage. Siddiq offers his services as a doctor to Maggie.

As he follows Dr. Carson outside, Gabriel notices signs that the place is trapped just before Dr. Carson steps into a bear trap, drawing walkers. Despite his dim eyesight, Gabriel manages to safely avoid the traps and walkers, and rescues Dr. Carson in time. However, the commotion leads a group of Saviors to find them. As they are being escorted away, Dr. Carson notices one of their guard's guns in close reach and grabs for it, but another Savior reacts and shoots and kills him first. Gabriel's faith is shaken, and he begins to cry as he is driven off by the Saviors.

Back at the Sanctuary, Gabriel is put to work under Eugene to help the Saviors' ammunition manufacturing process at Eugene's new outpost, the industrial machine shop, in advance of Negan's next offensive. When Eugene reports to Negan that their ammo will not be at full supply for several more days and suggests they build catapults instead, Negan comes up with a second plan, to infect some of the Saviors' weapons with walker blood, so that in the pending attack, they merely have to harm their foes to cause them to turn, rather than kill.

== Reception ==
=== Critical reception ===
The episode received generally positive reviews from critics. On Rotten Tomatoes, it holds a 60% with an average rating of 6.27 out of 10, based on 20 reviews. The site's consensus reads: "Focusing on different characters and presenting a new walker threat, "Dead Or Alive Or" is an entertaining episode—though one that struggles to build suspense."

=== Ratings ===
The episode drew a total viewership of 6.60 million with a 2.8 rating in adults aged 18-49. This was a decrease from the previous week, which had 6.82 million viewers. It is also the show's lowest total viewership since the season two episode "Secrets", which aired in 2011.
