= Bonds (The Walking Dead) =

- The Walking Dead episode
- Episode no.: Season 10; Episode 6
- Directed by: Dan Liu
- Written by: Kevin Deiboldt
- Cinematography by: Stephen Campbell
- Editing by: Geofrey Hildrew
- Original air date: November 10, 2019
- Running time: 45 minutes

Guest appearances
- Juan Javier Cardenas as Dante; Nadine Marissa as Nabila; James Parks as Captured Whisperer; Margot Bingham as Stephanie (voice only); Rebecca Koon as Cheryl

Episode chronology
← Previous "What It Always Is"	Next → "Open Your Eyes"
- The Walking Dead season 10

"Bonds" is the sixth episode of the tenth season of the post-apocalyptic horror television series The Walking Dead, which aired on AMC on November 10, 2019. The episode was written by Kevin Deiboldt and directed by Dan Liu.

Carol Peletier (Melissa McBride) and Daryl Dixon (Norman Reedus) go on a mission together while Siddiq (Avi Nash) struggles to solve a mystery. Negan (Jeffrey Dean Morgan) attempts to prove his worth to Alpha (Samantha Morton). The episode received positive reviews.

== Plot ==
Carol and Daryl go on a mission to find where Alpha is keeping the horde. They set up a watchpoint in view of the Whisperers' border. Eventually they see a Whisperer moving a herd of walkers into their territory. Daryl doesn't want to continue with the mission before returning to base and getting help, but Carol convinces him they can do it on their own.

In Whisperers territory, Negan is taken by Beta to Alpha, trying to prove his value for knowing everything about the communities' plans. Alpha decides to test Negan, which Beta oversees. Negan is unable to outdo Beta's strength and attempts to capture a live pig to present as food for the Whisperers.

At Hilltop, Eugene learns about the infection at Alexandria through the radio from Rosita. Meanwhile, at Alexandria, Siddiq and Dante rush to fight off a fast-moving infection within Alexandria, the cause of which they struggle to identify. That night, Siddiq, who is suffering from PTSD caused by witnessing the deaths of his friends, falls asleep in the infirmary but then wakes up on the windmill's balcony, unsure how he got there. Meanwhile, Eugene hears a new radio signal coming in with a female voice. He answers it, but they both agree to avoid sharing specific information. Eugene and the woman talk more, but the woman insists that Eugene should keep these conversations private.

Carol and Daryl track the Whisperers into the night, but unintentionally draw the walkers to them. While Daryl hides, Carol captures a Whisperer. They return to Alexandria with their captive. At the Whisperers camp, Beta refuses to give Negan any food, though another Whisperer shares with him. Beta catches this and kills the Whisperer as a walker horde arrives. Beta leaves Negan to defend himself. Beta returns to Alpha to tell her that Negan is dead. When Negan emerges, he goes straight to Alpha, kneels in front of her, and submits to her, which enrages Beta.

== Production ==
In an interview with Insider, Ryan Hurst spoke of his time filming the episode: "Beta and Negan, they couldn't be more diametrically opposite than anything. It's this stone-faced immovable person and then you have this mouthpiece who just will not shut up. Jeff [Dean Morgan] and I have been great friends for a long time. So the fact that we get to share the screen together is an enormous joy."

== Reception ==
=== Critical reception ===
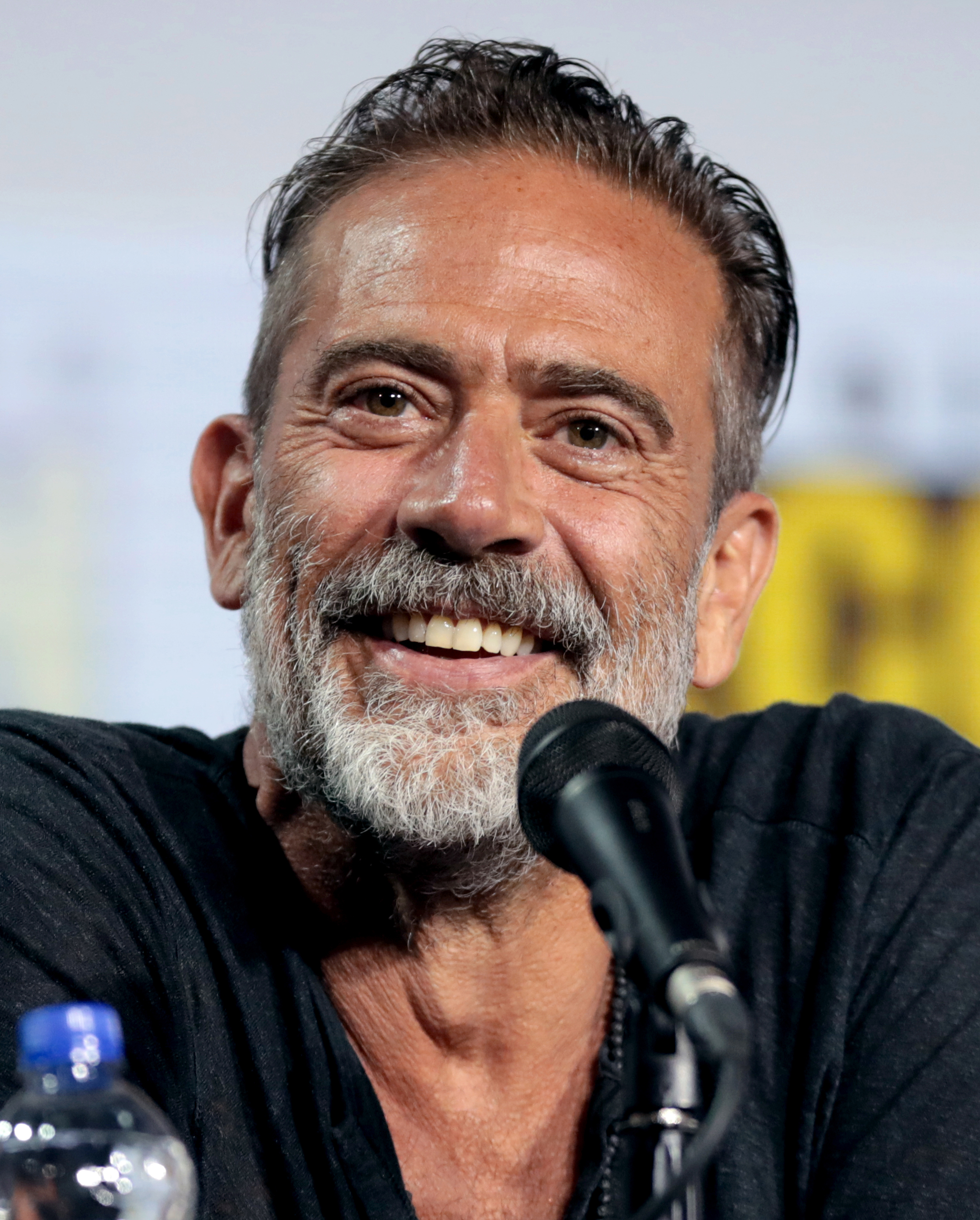
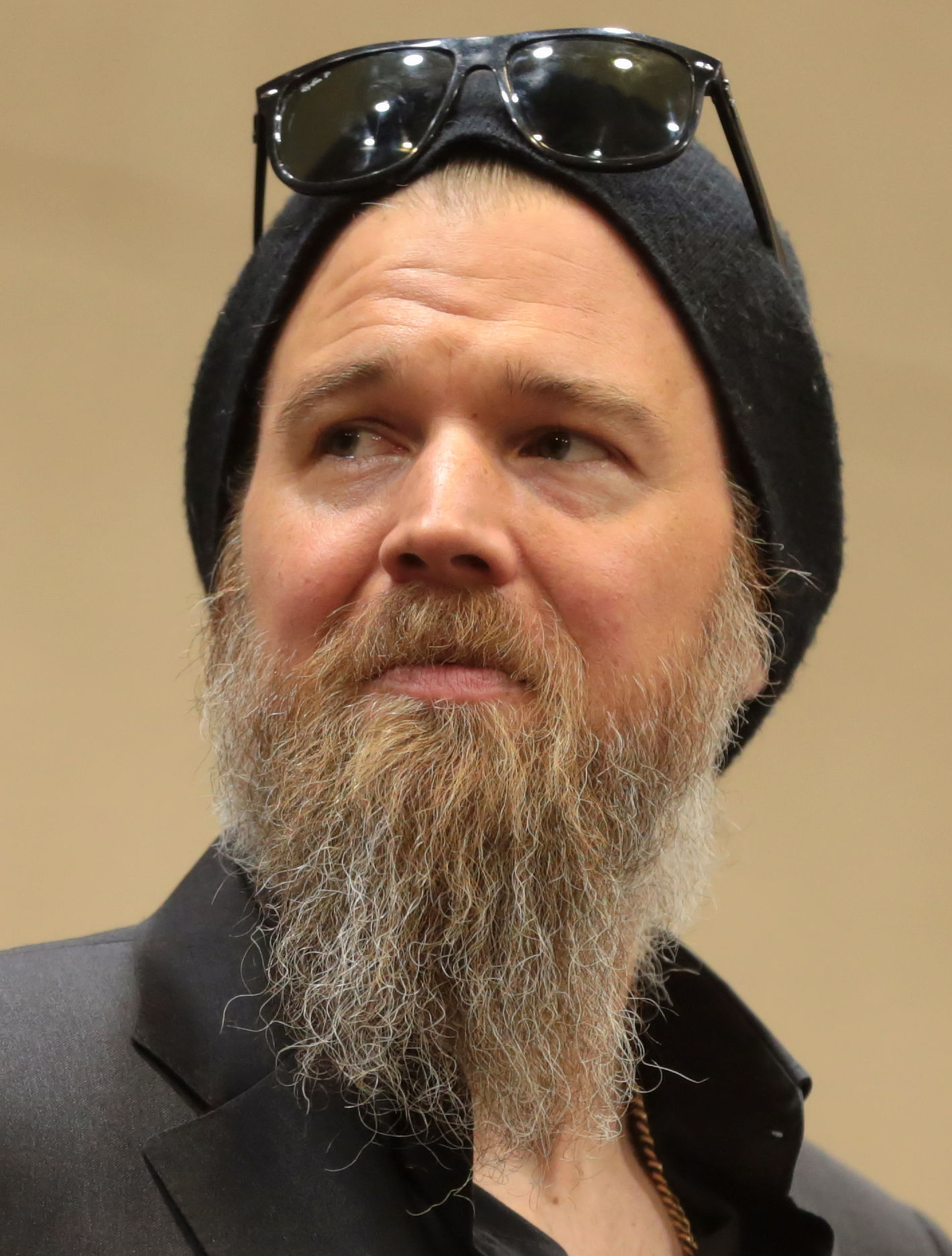
Jeffrey Dean Morgan (left) and Ryan Hurst (right) were praised by critics for their scenes together.

"Bonds" received positive reviews from critics, with particular praise towards Jeffrey Dean Morgan and Ryan Hurst's humorous interactions. On Rotten Tomatoes, the episode has an approval rating of 93% with an average score of 6.98 out of 10, based on 15 reviews. The site's critical consensus reads, "Though it ultimately sets up more than it pays off, 'Bonds' introduces a contentious dynamic between Negan and Alpha that offers some of this season's more memorable character moments."

Ron Hogan writing for Den of Geek! praised Negan's development in this episode and said: "Negan isn't the sort of person who would make a good addition to just about any group on The Walking Dead... He's abrasive, he's loud, he has a huge ego, and he's not exactly the hardest worker or the strongest worker. These are all things that Beta points out to both Alpha and Negan when Negan comes sauntering into the Whisperers camp with his hands tied up. Beta wants to kill him outright, but Alpha seems to have a sixth sense of when people might be useful, so she tells Beta that she wants him to be tested. And if he's found wanting, or if he's found useful, he'll be staying around with the group. One way or another, Negan isn't going back to Alexandria".

Matt Fowler of IGN gave the episode an 8.1 out of 10 and wrote, "The Walking Dead delivered a solid episode thanks to Negan's obnoxious interactions with the Whisperers".

Writing for Forbes, Erik Kain also praised Negan's development during the episode and said: "All told–in spite of my overarching complaints with regards to the show’s broader setup–this was another very good episode. Negan has become, shockingly, one of my favorite characters and he did not disappoint with his first Whisperer encounter. It’s interesting to see Alpha and Beta so at odds over him as well, and Negan’s whole kneeling monologue was hilarious".

In contrast, Jeff Stone of IndieWire gave the episode a mixed review with a "C" grade, and referred to it as "a lot of setup, but not a lot of drama."

=== Ratings ===
"Bonds" had an estimated 3.21 million viewers.
