= Disinherited =

Upcoming American crime drama series

- Genre: Crime drama
- Created by: Peter Gould
- Starring: Victoria Pedretti; Kiera Allen; Karl Glusman; Alan Ruck; Katja Herbers; Eddie Marsan; Jonathan Higginbotham; Avi Nash
- Country of origin: United States
- Original language: English

Production
- Executive producers: Peter Gould; Rian Johnson; Ram Bergman; Nena Rodrigue; Thomas Schnauz
- Cinematography: Lyle Vincent
- Production companies: Crystal Diner Productions; T-Street; FXP

Original release
- Network: FX; FX on Hulu

Disinherited is an upcoming American crime drama television series created by Peter Gould and starring Victoria Pedretti and Kiera Allen for FX.

== Premise ==
An unexpected inheritance thrusts a pair of scrappy sisters into a world of generational wealth and long-buried crimes.

== Cast ==
- Victoria Pedretti as Marian
- Kiera Allen as Sarah
- Karl Glusman as a paralegal who helps Sarah and Marian with the inheritance
- Alan Ruck as a powerful attorney who handles the sisters' inheritance case
- Katja Herbers as a mother of a young boy who seemingly comes from an important family
- Eddie Marsan
- Jonathan Higginbotham
- Avi Nash

== Production ==
=== Development ===
On June 4, 2025, it was reported that FX had given a pilot order to Disinherited from Peter Gould, whom he's set to write, direct, and executive produce alongside Rian Johnson, Ram Bergman, and Nena Rodrigue of T-Street. On March 4, 2026, it was announced that the pilot was picked up to series.

=== Casting ===
Alongside the pilot order, it was also announced that Victoria Pedretti and Kiera Allen will star in the pilot. On October 7, 2025, Karl Glusman, Alan Ruck, Katja Herbers, Eddie Marsan, and Jonathan Higginbotham joined the cast with Glusman portraying a paralegal who helps Sarah and Marian with the inheritance, Ruck portraying a powerful attorney who handles the sisters' inheritance case, and Herbers portraying a mother of a young boy who seemingly comes from an important family. In August 2026, Avi Nash joined the cast as series regular.
