= Open Your Eyes (The Walking Dead) =

- The Walking Dead episode
- Episode no.: Season 10; Episode 7
- Directed by: Michael Cudlitz
- Written by: Corey Reed
- Cinematography by: Duane Charles Manwiller
- Editing by: Jack Colwell; Shari Mead
- Original air date: November 17, 2019
- Running time: 44 minutes

Guest appearances
- Thora Birch as Gamma / Mary; Juan Javier Cardenas as Dante; James Parks as Captured Whisperer; Matt Mangum as D.J.; Rebecca Koon as Cheryl

Episode chronology
← Previous "Bonds"	Next → "The World Before"
- The Walking Dead season 10

"Open Your Eyes" is the seventh episode of the tenth season of the post-apocalyptic horror television series The Walking Dead, which aired on AMC on November 17, 2019.

== Plot ==
Siddiq struggles with ongoing visions of being held captive and Alpha killing people and a voice telling him to open his eyes, but does not know if these are dreams or past visions due to the fatigue from dealing with the infections in Alexandria.

Carol secures the Whisperer she and Daryl caught in the prison. Gabriel, fearing that Alpha will retaliate, insists that the prisoner receive medical treatment. On the roof, Lydia says that the prisoner has been trained to avoid harsh interrogation, and instead suggests to Carol to show him the value of life within Alexandria to turn him. Carol offers the man sandwiches but he spits them back at her. Carol and Daryl revert to a more harsh interrogation, but Carol pauses after hearing him praise Alpha for sacrificing Lydia. Carol realizes that the Whisperers, outside of Alpha, do not know about Lydia's safety, and considers using her as a pawn to reveal Alpha's lies to the Whisperer. Carol goes to get Lydia to see the prisoner but discovers that he died shortly before their arrival. Dante discovers that the medical kit being used to treat the prisoner's wounds contained hemlock, which was mistakenly given to him; Siddiq blames himself, as he realizes that he accidentally added the hemlock to the bag due to his fatigue.

Meanwhile, Aaron continues to meet with Gamma at their boundary, hoping to bond with her. Gamma tells him she is an only child. She later goes back to the Whisperers camp, where Alpha questions her, and then ritualistically whips her arm. Alpha then says she believes in Gamma, and tells her that Aaron is tempting her with lies.

After seeing Dante burying one of the older infected women that he had grown close to, Siddiq attempts to commit suicide by drowning himself, but is rescued by Rosita. As they talk, Siddiq has a realization and rushes to test the water supply, discovering it to be contaminated; he blames himself for failing to notice.

Despite Daryl's strong opposition, Carol takes Lydia to see the Whisperers, and that night comes across one of Aaron and Gamma's meetings, where Gamma has taken Aaron at knifepoint to demand more intel. Carol and Lydia rush forward. Upon seeing Lydia, Gamma panics and runs away; when Lydia discovers that Carol simply used her as a pawn, she flees as well. Carol and Aaron are forced to retreat as walkers approach.

After decontaminating the water supply, Dante tries to cheer up a depressed Siddiq, reassuring him that what happened wasn't his fault. While doing so, Dante then makes a strange verbal tic which causes Siddiq to have another lucid dream, in which he remembers one of the Whisperers' making the same tic during the decapitation of several fair attendees. He realizes that Dante is a Whisperer agent who helped Alpha sneak into the Kingdom's fair and capture the victims. He moves to attack Dante, but Dante gets the upper hand and is able to subdue and choke him to death.

== Production ==
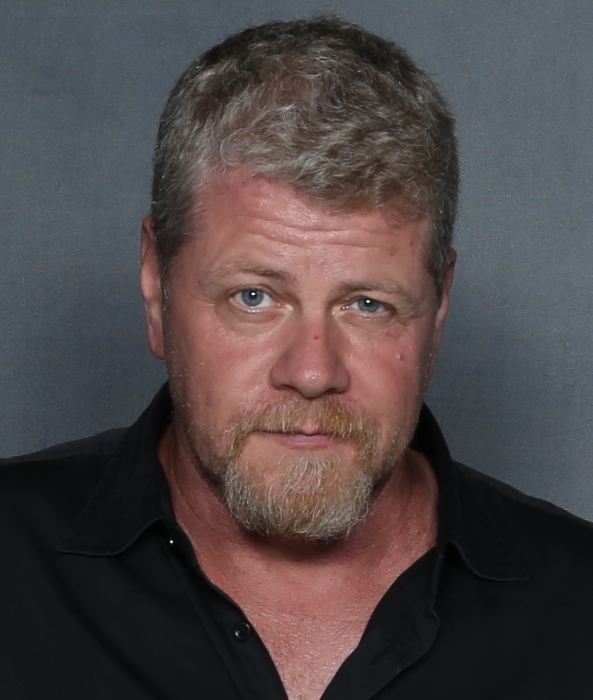
Cudlitz, who played Abraham Ford, directed his third episode for the series.

This episode marks the death of Siddiq played by Avi Nash. The episode was directed by Michael Cudlitz, who portrayed Abraham Ford on the series. This is the third episode Cudlitz directed for The Walking Dead.

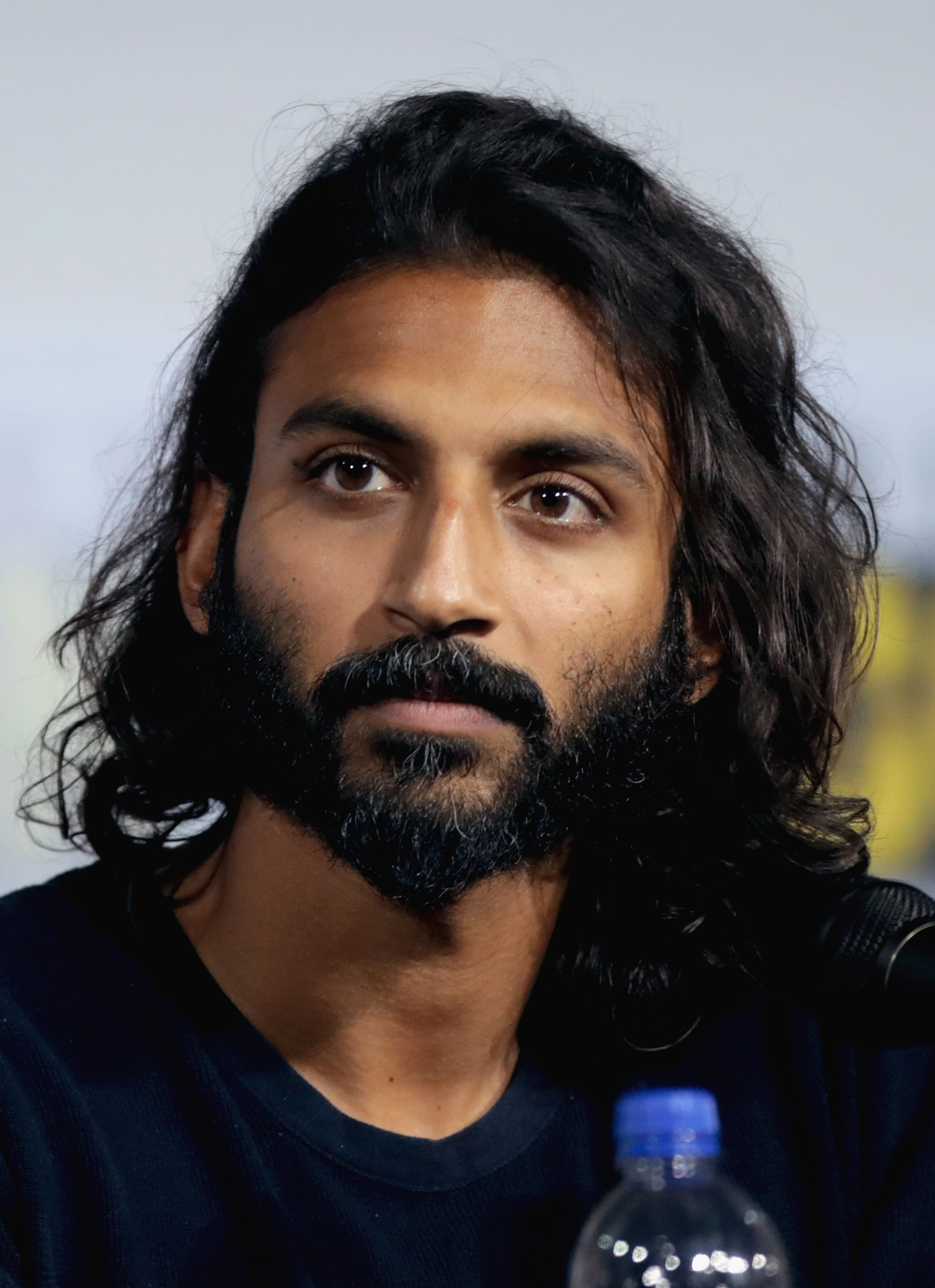
The episode marks the death of Siddiq played by Avi Nash

== Reception ==
=== Critical reception ===
"Open Your Eyes" received critical acclaim, with particular praise for the twist ending and Avi Nash's performance. On Rotten Tomatoes, the episode has an approval rating of 93% with an average score of 8.09 out of 10, based on 15 reviews. The site's critical consensus reads, "'Open Your Eyes' fulfills the potential of the foundations laid earlier in this season with a surprising character death and some ingenious twists."

=== Ratings ===
"Open Your Eyes" received a total viewership of 3.31 million and was the highest-rated cable program of the night.
