= The World Before (The Walking Dead) =

- The Walking Dead episode
- Episode no.: Season 10; Episode 8
- Directed by: John Dahl
- Written by: Julia Ruchman
- Cinematography by: Stephen Campbell
- Editing by: Alan Cody
- Original air date: November 24, 2019
- Running time: 54 minutes

Guest appearances
- Dan Fogler as Luke; Thora Birch as Gamma / Mary; Kevin Carroll as Virgil; Kenric Green as Scott; Juan Javier Cardenas as Dante; Angel Theory as Kelly; Sydney Park as Cyndie; Avianna Mynhier as Rachel Ward; Lindsley Register as Laura; Kerry Cahill as Dianne

Episode chronology
← Previous "Open Your Eyes"	Next → "Squeeze"
- The Walking Dead season 10

"The World Before" is the eighth episode and first-part finale of the tenth season of the post-apocalyptic horror television series The Walking Dead, which aired on AMC on November 24, 2019. The episode was written by Julia Ruchman and directed by John Dahl.

== Plot ==
In a flashback several months after the blizzard, Alpha chooses and assigns Dante, due to his loyalty and because Lydia doesn't know him, to infiltrate Alexandria as her spy and sabotage the community from the inside for the impending war between them. It is revealed that Dante is the one who painted the "Silence the Whispers" graffiti, sabotaged the water supply, and suffocated Cheryl to death. In the present, Rosita goes to visit Siddiq, but finds Dante who attacks her. Rosita is able to stab Dante in the shoulder with a knife and is forced to put down a reanimated Siddiq, before beating Dante unconscious.

At the border, Gamma reveals information to Aaron about the current position of the horde in exchange for seeing her nephew. She also reveals her real name is Mary. Aaron returns to Alexandria, where Daryl, Carol, Gabriel, and Rosita interrogate Dante. They later hold an Islamic funeral for Siddiq, led by Gabriel who delivers a eulogy. Rosita is distraught over Siddiq's death and releases her anger by killing walkers on the outskirts of the community; she is helped by Eugene.

Meanwhile, Michonne, Judith, and Luke travel to Oceanside. Along the way, they visit a library for books and music. While looking at music sheets, Luke is attacked by walkers from among the bookshelves. He is rescued by an unknown person who then runs away. When they arrive at Oceanside, a man named Virgil is captured and Michonne threatens him with death if he doesn't explain himself. Luke recognizes him as the one who saved him in the library. Before he can explain, the group is attacked by walkers.

That evening in Alexandria, Gabriel visits an imprisoned Dante and ends up stabbing him to death. As night falls, Daryl, Carol, and Aaron set out and meet with Jerry, Magna, Connie, and Kelly to locate the horde. At Oceanside, Virgil explains he was just looking for supplies and wants to get back to his family. They live on a fortified naval base, but it is hard to find. Michonne agrees to help Virgil find his family in exchange for weapons from the base to destroy Alpha's horde.

In the morning, Michonne leaves Judith a walkie-talkie for them to communicate and they say their goodbyes. Michonne and Virgil then sail away on a boat toward the island. Judith and Luke later return to Alexandria. Meanwhile in the forest, the group finds the location where the walker horde used to be is empty and instead decide to go look for Lydia. Carol spots Alpha and chases her. The whole group follows her which leads them directly into a cave, where they are trapped and surrounded by Alpha's gargantuan horde of walkers.

== Production ==
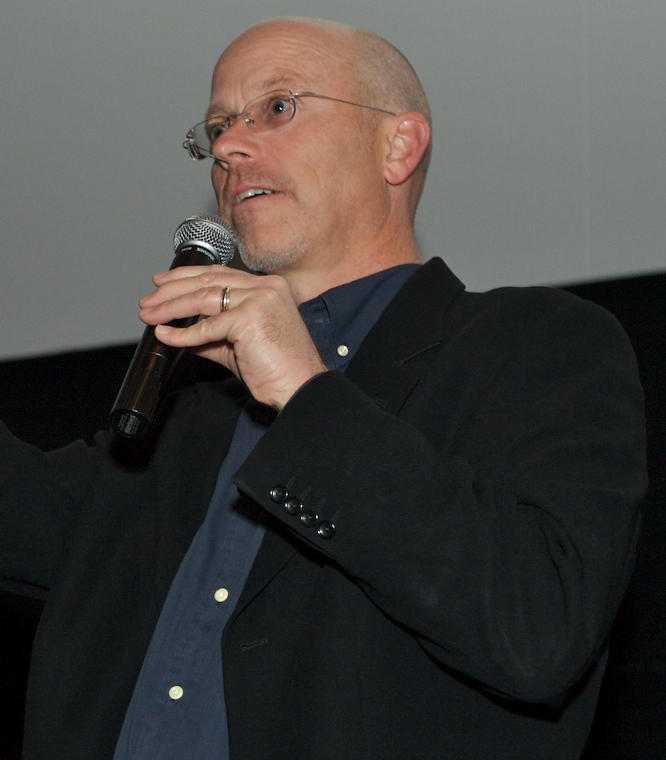
The episode was directed by John Dahl, who directed for the series for the first time

The episode features the first appearance of Virgil, played by Kevin Carroll. His casting was first announced in July 2019. This episode was directed by John Dahl, marking the first episode he had directed for the series.

== Reception ==
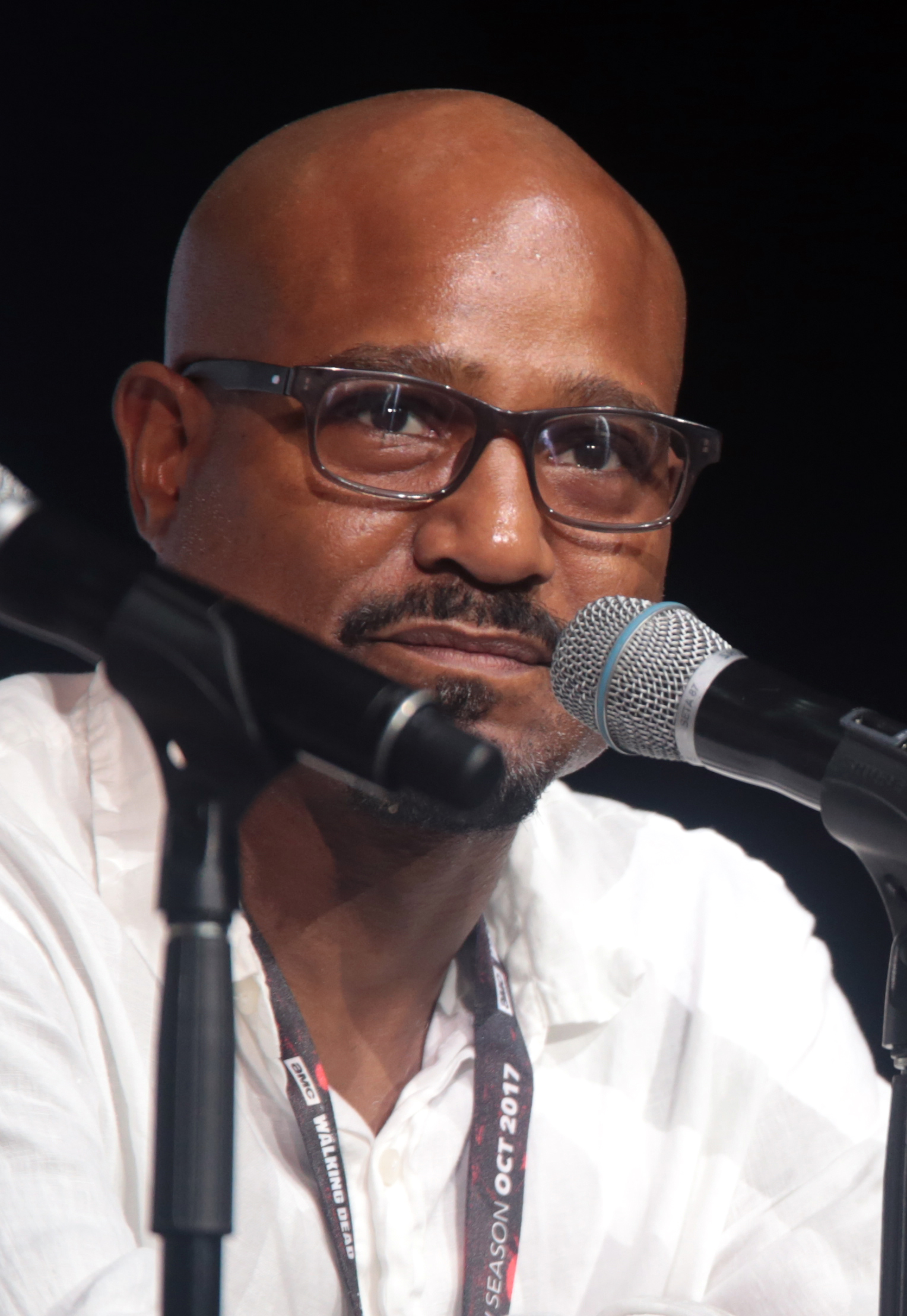
Seth Gilliam was critically acclaimed for his performance while the development of Father Gabriel was also praised

=== Critical reception ===
"The World Before" received generally positive reviews, with particular praise towards the character development of Gabriel. On Rotten Tomatoes, the episode has an approval rating of 90% with an average score of 6.94 out of 10, based on 20 reviews. The site's critical consensus reads, "A somewhat anticlimatic [sic] and uneven effort, 'The World Before' still manages to leave the door open for a engaging slate of plot threads in the second half of TWD's 10th season."

Brian Lowry writing for CNN praised the episode and wrote: "Through the first half of the 10th season, the series has regained a degree of momentum, thanks to the way the writers have showcased key characters". Erik Kain of Forbes praised the development of Rosita and Gabriel and wrote: "Gabriel vs Dante and Rosita vs Dante scenes were both spectacular, but the whole "find the herd" plot and everything Whisperer related-including the weirdly anticlimactic cliffhanger-are just meh". Writing for TV Fanatic, Paul Dailly said in his review, "In some respects, it worked. In others, it felt like the producers forgot about a lot of storylines that should have gotten resolved, or at the very least, gotten some more steam to keep fans pondering as they await the next batch of episodes".

=== Ratings ===
"The World Before" received a total viewership of 3.21 million, with a 1.0 rating in adults aged 18–49. It was the highest-rated cable program of the night, however, it marked a slight decrease in viewership from the previous week.
