= Siddiq (The Walking Dead) =

- The Walking Dead character
- From left to right: Siddiq, as he appears in the comic book series, television series (portrayed by Avi Nash) and video game series.
- First appearance: Comic: "Issue #127" (2014); Video game: "In Too Deep" (2016); Television: "Mercy" (2017)
- Last appearance: Comic: "Issue #192" (2019); Video game: "What We Deserve" (2016); Television: "What We Become" (2020)
- Created by: Robert Kirkman; Charlie Adlard
- Adapted by: Scott M. Gimple (The Walking Dead)
- Portrayed by: Avi Nash
- Voiced by: T. J. Ramini (video game)

In-universe information
- Occupation: Member of the Militia; Comic: Construction Foreman for the Alexandria Safe-Zone; Television: Resident Doctor; Doctor for the Alexandria Safe-Zone; Alexandria Council Member; Video game: First Mate of the ship Companion
- Significant other: Rosita Espinosa
- Children: Television: Socorro Espinosa (daughter)

Siddiq is a fictional character from the comic book series The Walking Dead and the television series of the same name, where he was portrayed by Avi Nash.

== Appearances ==
=== Comic book series ===
Siddiq is a member of the construction crew who arrived during the two year time skip. During the fair, he heads up the effort to build rooms for the new arrivals.

=== Video games ===
Siddiq appears in The Walking Dead: Michonne, which takes place before he first appeared in the comics. He appeared as a crew member of the Companion, serving under the ship's captain Pete, along with two other men, Berto and Oak. Regardless of the player's choices, Siddiq would survive the game.

=== Television series ===
==== Season 8 ====
In the season premiere "Mercy", Siddiq is first seen surrendering to Carl and tells him that he has not eaten in a few days. When Carl suddenly points a gun at Siddiq, he tries to calm Carl down and then Rick comes and fires a few warning shots, scaring Siddiq away. Later, Carl returns and leaves two cans of food with a note saying: "Sorry." Siddiq watches Carl from the bushes as he walks away. In the episode "The King, the Widow, and Rick", Carl encounters Siddiq while Carl scavenges outside Alexandria. Carl apologizes for Rick's earlier hostility towards Siddiq, and Carl offers him food and water. Noticing that Siddiq was trapping a walker, Carl asks Siddiq the three questions that Rick uses to judge potential members of his group - “how many walkers have you killed”, “how many people have you killed”, and “why” - and is impressed with his answers.

Carl chooses to lead Siddiq to Alexandria, promising to vouch for him once they get there. En route, they are attacked by a small group of walkers, some which pin down Carl before he can dispatch them; appearing uninjured, they continue on. In the mid-season finale "How It's Gotta Be", Carl sneaks Siddiq into Alexandria, and they wait in the sewers with the rest of the survivors while the Saviors attack, and Carl reveals that he was bitten by a walker while bringing Siddiq to Alexandria. Siddiq looks on while Rick and Michonne sit with Carl and cry.

In the mid-season premiere "Honor", in a flashback, Carl keeps his bite mark hidden, and makes sure Siddiq finds quarters in the sewers below the community. Siddiq tells Carl that he was a medical resident and gives him medicine. After Carl kills himself, Siddiq vows to honor him by showing everyone that Carl’s choice to save him mattered.

In the episode "Dead or Alive Or", Daryl, aided by Rosita, Tara, and Siddiq, lead the survivors from the destroyed Alexandria Safe-Zone towards the Hilltop while avoiding Savior patrols who are under orders to seek them out by Negan; Dwight, a former Savior who has helped the Alexandrians, helps to guide them using his knowledge of the area, but most of the others remain cautious of his advice, knowing his duplicity. They come to find the safest route is to cross through a swamp, and Daryl puts Tara in charge of protecting the survivors while he, Rosita, and Siddiq weed out the walkers half-submerged in the swamp.

Later, Maggie decides to allow the Saviors held captive at the Hilltop to have limited rations and supervised time outside their cage, and Siddiq offers his services as a doctor to Maggie. In the episode "Do Not Send Us Astray", as the Hilltop prepares for the Saviors to attack, Siddiq visits the infirmary. During the attack, Siddiq aids Tobin after he is injured, and Rick nearly kills Siddiq when he mistakes him for a Savior. The next day, Siddiq offers to treat Rick's wound and tries to console him about Carl's death, but Rick refuses to accept any sympathy and walks off.

After the wounded reanimate as walkers and attack, Siddiq checks on the Savior prisoners and struggles with some of them who had become walkers; Alden saves him from the attack. In the episode "Worth", Siddiq is seen at the infirmary. In the season finale "Wrath", at the Hilltop, Rick and company prepare to launch their offensive against the Saviors. In the midst of events, Rick goes to tend to the baby Gracie and encounters Siddiq. Rick asks how Carl was bitten; Siddiq tells him how Carl was bit while honoring Siddiq's mother, someone he never knew. Later, during the fight, Rick critically wounds Negan, but tells Siddiq to save him as he tells the gathered people that they will start a new world.

==== Season 9 ====
In “A New Beginning”, Siddiq was part of the supply search expedition inside an abandoned museum in the city of Washington, D.C., and in the course he was attacked by a walker full of spiders, confessing to the rest of the group his fear for the arachnid. After finding the wooden car and the agricultural machinery that the Sanctuary needed, the boy helped the rest of the group to carefully pass the car through a glass floor that contained a gigantic number of walkers inside. On their trip to the communities once the mission was over and after discovering that the bridge that connected with them had been blocked by a storm, the survivors without further choice were forced to look for other routes to their destination and on the way the car that They were getting stuck under mud, as a group of walkers approached their location. After he managed to free the wooden vehicle and prepare to escape, Siddiq watched in horror as Ken was bitten by one of the creatures and in an attempt to save the boy's life, he simply couldn't do anything else for him but just see how he succumbed to the infection. In “The Bridge”, as the weeks went by, Siddiq trained Enid with the subject of medicine once the girl recovered from her injuries and tested her in the camp that served as the base of operations for the construction of the bridge that connected with all the communities; watching as Cyndie's injured hand sutures. After noticing Enid's good progress, Siddiq proposed to Rick to leave Enid as the nurse of the group while he returned to Alexandria to help anyone in need in the community. In “Warning Signs”, in Alexandria's infirmary, Siddiq was visited by Rick, Michonne and Judith to take a look at the latter about the cough he had; and used Rick as another patient to make her understand that nothing bad was going to happen to her.

In “Who Are You Now?”, Six years after Rick’s apparent death on the Alexandria Bridge, Siddiq has become the community’s official doctor. Siddiq maintained his loyalty to Michonne and decided to remain in Alexandria to help people in need in the infirmary for about six years. With the arrival of a group of outsiders to their doors after they were rescued by Judith from a herd of walkers, Siddiq quickly treated the wound that one of the newcomers had done to the head and subsequently attended the meeting convened at the church of the place to decide its destiny within the walls. Convinced that the newcomers were not a problem for anyone, Siddiq agreed to allow them to stay in the community; although he eventually changed his mind after Michonne unmasked the team leader about her dark past and the knife she had hidden in her belt. In “Stradivarius”, when Michonne decided to escort the newcomers to Hilltop instead of abandoning them to her fate, Siddiq accompanied the woman on her trip and maintained that she had to allow Magna and her companions to remain in Alexandria, but it made it clear that only I was helping them for their daughter. After arriving at the site where Magna's group was previously camping, the outsiders were sad to discover that the place was razed by walkers and that none of their other companions managed to survive, and while they collected some supplements from the ground, Siddiq found a flute that belonged to Luke and confessed to having played the instrument during his youth. After spending the night in an old warehouse, Siddiq tried to convince Michonne to change his mind about traveling with them to Hilltop and finally informed him that Maggie and her baby had left the community to found other establishments with Georgie. Before being able to explain what happened, the group was ambushed by several walkers and Siddiq along with the rest of his companions defended themselves from the creatures and escaped terrified of the place. On his way to Hilltop, Siddiq was forgiven by Michonne for having hidden what happened with Maggie and was subsequently informed by two community guards that Rosita had been admitted to Hilltop's infirmary after being found unconscious in the forest.

In “Evolution”, once in Hilltop, Siddiq was informed of Rosita's condition after being treated in the community and how a search group made up of Daryl, Jesus and Aaron had left the place to search for the missing Eugene. Repented by the secret he had kept to Michonne, Siddiq again apologized to the woman for what he had done and subsequently visited Rosita in the infirmary only to listen to the warnings of this one that Daryl and his team had no idea what They faced.

In “Adaptation”, Siddiq was one of many people to sadly observe the arrival of Daryl and his team to the community with the lifeless body of Jesus; and quickly proceeded to attend to Eugene of his dislocated leg in his office. While looking for some bandages for the man, Siddiq watched as Rosita left the room to be able to vomit away from others and offered to address her discomfort by stating that she was still recovering from her injuries, but was informed by her that she was pregnant with him as product of the adventures they had before starting a relationship with Gabriel. Later, Siddiq attended the funeral of Jesus organized by the inhabitants of the community and once the funeral was over, the man left with Michonne and the rest of Alexandria's group to return home. In “Guardians”, when Michonne discovered that the council had hidden her mission of contacting other communities through a satellite radio, Siddiq was part of the meeting and reminded the woman that they needed the Kingdom and the rest of the communities to preserve the survival of Alexandria, but she told him that he would not sacrifice his own people to the dangers that lurked the world to save the Kingdom. Later, when Rosita proposed to Gabriel to talk about the baby that was to come, Siddiq and the woman waited for the priest on the porch of his house and as the future father of the creature, he decided to join the meeting to take part in the future plans they had with the new blessing of their lives.

In "The Calm Before", Siddiq is among the group of Hilltop residents who are kidnapped by Alpha, the leader of the group The Whisperers, and is the only survivor of the ensuing massacre. Siddiq returns to Hilltop to tell the heartbroken residents how their friends died as heroes. It is implied that Siddiq has post-traumatic stress disorder as a result of witnessing the massacre.

In "The Storm", A few months have passed after the massacre that marked the life of the communities, Siddiq returned to Alexandria with the rest of his companions and, with a strong blizzard putting everyone's life at risk, Siddiq was forced to take refuge inside the community church waiting for the storm to pass and with Negan also sheltering inside the place, Siddiq heard the jokes of the man about the false fatherhood that Gabriel was going to exercise with a baby that would not be his; but they were interrupted when the chimney suddenly exploded and prevented them from continuing to heat up to protect themselves from the cold. With no time to lose, Siddiq followed Gabriel's plan to move to Aaron's house and with his companions he tied himself to a rope and entered the storm setting his way to his new refuge. When Negan left the group to rescue Judith from the storm - after the little girl ventured in search of Daryl's dog - and was hurt in the process, Siddiq took care of the man's wounds and left the room so he could talk with Michonne about his heroic feat.

==== Season 10 ====
In the season premiere: "Lines We Cross", several months have passed since the mysterious disappearance of The Whisperers in the area, Siddiq could enjoy the birth of the baby he was waiting for with Rosita and set off to take the role of father, receiving the help of Eugene and Gabriel with the care of Coconut. Despite his deep happiness, Siddiq was not able to get rid of his head contemplating how his friends were executed by Alpha and began to have hallucinations due to his post-traumatic stress disorder. After observing how a satellite fell in the vicinity of the space and collapsed within the territory of the Whispers, Siddiq decided to lend his help to extinguish the forest fire that had caused the disaster and had no choice but to cross the border that his enemies had marked.

In "Ghosts," when Alexandria was attacked by herds of walkers for forty-nine hours, Siddiq helped defend the community of creatures along with the rest of his companions and subsequently attended the meeting convened by Michonne to discuss what was happening, although he suffered again of hallucinations that forced him to retire. His disorder in turn prevented him from attending to the wound that Carol had done while defending himself against some walkers and his problems were eventually discovered by Dante, who told him that he understood what was going on and enjoyed a drink together thus encouraging their friendship.

In "Silence the Whisperers," more hallucinations about what happened in the stable began to dominate Siddiq's mind and prevented him from paying full attention to the scene of the crime committed by Negan against one of the bandits in his attempt to save Lydia from her abusers; heading quickly to the infirmary and immersing his face against icy water. After stabilizing, Siddiq was part of the council meeting to discuss Negan's fate and was one of those who voted in favor of forgiving the prisoner's life instead proposing to focus all his attention against the true enemy that was stalking them, but when the vote was in a tie with Gabriel being the last one left to vote, Siddiq had no choice but to wait for the priest to give his final testimony and thus apply the measures against Negan.

In "What It Always Is," when Negan escaped from his cell, Siddiq accompanied Daryl in the search for the prisoner and took advantage of the fact that they were near Hilltop to go to the community and rest. Offering his help in the infirmary of the place, Siddiq noticed the bad state in which Ezekiel was and after examining it he discovered a large lump in his neck due to thyroid cancer that was affecting him, and despite proposing treatments that could help him out from the terrible situation he is facing, Ezekiel opposed and chose to accept his destiny. Feeling compassion for his friend and knowing that he could die at any time, Siddiq decided to help him have a conversation with Carol after so long using his radio and then prepared to return to Alexandria during the night to continue offering his help. in the community

In "Open Your Eyes," Siddiq realizes that his friend and fellow doctor Dante is in fact a Whisperer, and the one who had forced him to watch the executions of his friends. In the fight that follows, Dante strangles Siddiq to death from behind to protect his secret.

In the mid-season finale "The World Before," Dante reflects on the events leading up to Siddiq's murder before finally going to prevent him from reanimating. However, Dante only gets as far as closing Siddiq's eyes before they are interrupted by Rosita, who quickly grows suspicious of Dante's behavior. As Rosita and Dante enter into a struggle, Siddiq reanimates and is drawn by the cries of his daughter. However, before the zombified Siddiq can hurt Coco, Rosita manages to overpower Dante and puts Siddiq down by stabbing him in the head with Dante's knife. Siddiq is subsequently given a funeral attended by his friends and family. Later, an enraged Gabriel, who loved Siddiq like a brother, kills Dante in his cell.

In "What We Become," Siddiq reappears in Michonne's hallucinations, where Siddiq tells her to imagine the sun. At first Michonne is glad to see him, but he blames her for his murder and also begins to blame her for the deaths of Rick and Carl. Siddiq then asks what will happen to his family when he is gone. Michonne starts crying and tells Siddiq that he is her family, but the latter responds "this is how it feels to be your family".

== Development and reception ==
Siddiq is portrayed by Avi Nash on The Walking Dead television series. Greg Nicotero explained the significance of Siddiq's first appearance in the eighth season premiere "Mercy" to Entertainment Weekly, and why Rick is heard saying "My mercy prevails over my wrath" in one of the layered timelines of the episode: "you hear that line in the episode, because Siddiq says it to Carl in the gas station when he's talking about his mom and he was talking about the traveler and all this stuff, and it's Siddiq that says that he's basically quoting something that his mom said. So when you broke it down that way there might even be four timelines because if you think about Rick at Glenn and Abraham's graves, and then you think about Rick on the back of the truck when he's doing his speech so yeah, we always do that because it always gives the audience an opportunity to put some of these timelines together for themselves."

The Hollywood Reporter asked actor Chandler Riggs if his character Carl died a hero in the episode "How It's Gotta Be" for sacrificing his life to save Siddiq - someone he did not know - and Riggs replied: "I definitely think so. It wasn't saving Siddiq, it was saving all of Alexandria. He was the reason that they all got to safety — because he stalled the Saviors and [prevented] them from finding any Alexandrians with his smoke grenades and he led them away from everyone and saved everyone. It was a pretty cool way to go out." Riggs also joked with Entertainment Weekly that Carl's death "was all Siddiq's mom's fault".

In the season finale "Wrath", when Siddiq finally tells Rick that Carl was bitten by a walker while trying to honor Siddiq's mother, Erik Kain of Forbes commented that "The Siddiq and Rick scene should [have] happened two episodes ago. It was fine, I guess, but felt really out of place."

He was promoted to series regular for season 9.
