= Honor (The Walking Dead) =

- The Walking Dead episode
- Rick and Michonne wait outside the church, moments before an infected Carl's death.
- Episode no.: Season 8 Episode 9
- Directed by: Greg Nicotero
- Written by: Matthew Negrete; Channing Powell
- Cinematography by: Duane Manwiller
- Editing by: Dan Liu
- Original air date: February 25, 2018
- Running time: 56 minutes

Guest appearances
- Jayson Warner Smith as Gavin; Cooper Andrews as Jerry; Avi Nash as Siddiq; Jason Douglas as Tobin; Kenric Green as Scott; Macsen Lintz as Henry; Nadine Marissa as Nabila; Mandi Christine Kerr as Barbara; Kinsley Isla Dillon as Six Year-Old Judith; Ted Huckabee as Bruce

Episode chronology
← Previous "How It's Gotta Be"	Next → "The Lost and the Plunderers"
- The Walking Dead season 8

"Honor" is the ninth episode and mid-season premiere of the eighth season of the post-apocalyptic horror television series The Walking Dead, which aired on AMC on February 25, 2018. The episode was written by Matthew Negrete and Channing Powell, and directed by Greg Nicotero.

The episode is the final regular appearance of Chandler Riggs as Carl Grimes, who had been on the series since the first season. It also marks the departure of actor Jayson Warner Smith as Gavin, who had been part of the recurring cast since the previous season.

== Plot ==
Following Negan and the Saviors' assault on the communities of Alexandria, the Kingdom, and the Hilltop convoy, Rick (Andrew Lincoln) and his allies deal with the aftermath of events. In a flashback, Carl, having been bitten by a walker while trying to bring Siddiq to Alexandria, keeps his bite mark hidden, makes sure Siddiq finds quarters in the sewers below the community, spends time with his toddler sister Judith, and writes several letters to those he knows.

In the present, while Gavin and the other Saviors of his group keep watch over Ezekiel inside the Kingdom, outside Carol has led the survivors far enough away and instructs them to continue toward the house she used outside of the Kingdom for shelter, while she goes back to rescue Ezekiel. Henry, who is trained in both firearm and melee combat, and whose older brother Benjamin had been killed by Jared, a Savior, insists that he come along to assist, but Carol orders him to stay with the others.

Rick and Michonne regroup with all the other Alexandria survivors in the storm sewers and come to learn of Carl's impending death. They decide to wait until Negan's assault is over and then head off to the Hilltop to regroup. Rick knows Carl will not survive the journey, and he and Michonne remain with Carl. Before leading the rest away, Daryl commends Carl on their survival due to Carl's intent to stay out of the war with the Saviors and the preparations he had made. Carl and Rick spend much time discussing the past; Carl explains why he brought Siddiq here, and how he felt remorse for having killed a youth back during their time at the prison; Rick forgives him for these past transgressions.

Carol meets up with Morgan, who had escaped the Saviors' massacre of Rick's snipers watching the Sanctuary. However, Morgan has become bitter and once the two are inside the Kingdom, he becomes brutal in dispatching the Saviors. At one point during the mission, Morgan disembowels a Savior as Carol and a rescued Ezekiel watch. Gavin, the last Savior of the group left alive, flees and attempts to hide, but Morgan easily finds him. Morgan prepares to kill Gavin, but Carol senses that Morgan is conflicted and attempts to convince him to spare Gavin. A distressed Morgan balks, trying to decide what to do, when suddenly Gavin is stabbed through the neck from behind by Henry, who had followed Carol and is seeking revenge for the murder of his brother.

As Rick and Michonne move Carl up to the church, Carl insists that Rick can become a better person; in his mind (shown in a dream sequence first seen in "Mercy"), Carl imagined his father in the future becoming compassionate rather than vengeful, and devoting his time to raising their family and leading the Alexandria community. All survivors, including Negan, work together harmoniously to make Alexandria a thriving community in this dream. The next morning, a near-death Carl sends Rick and Michonne out of the church, and shoots himself rather than force them to have to do it once he dies; Rick and Michonne prepare a burial site to lay Carl to rest.

== Development ==
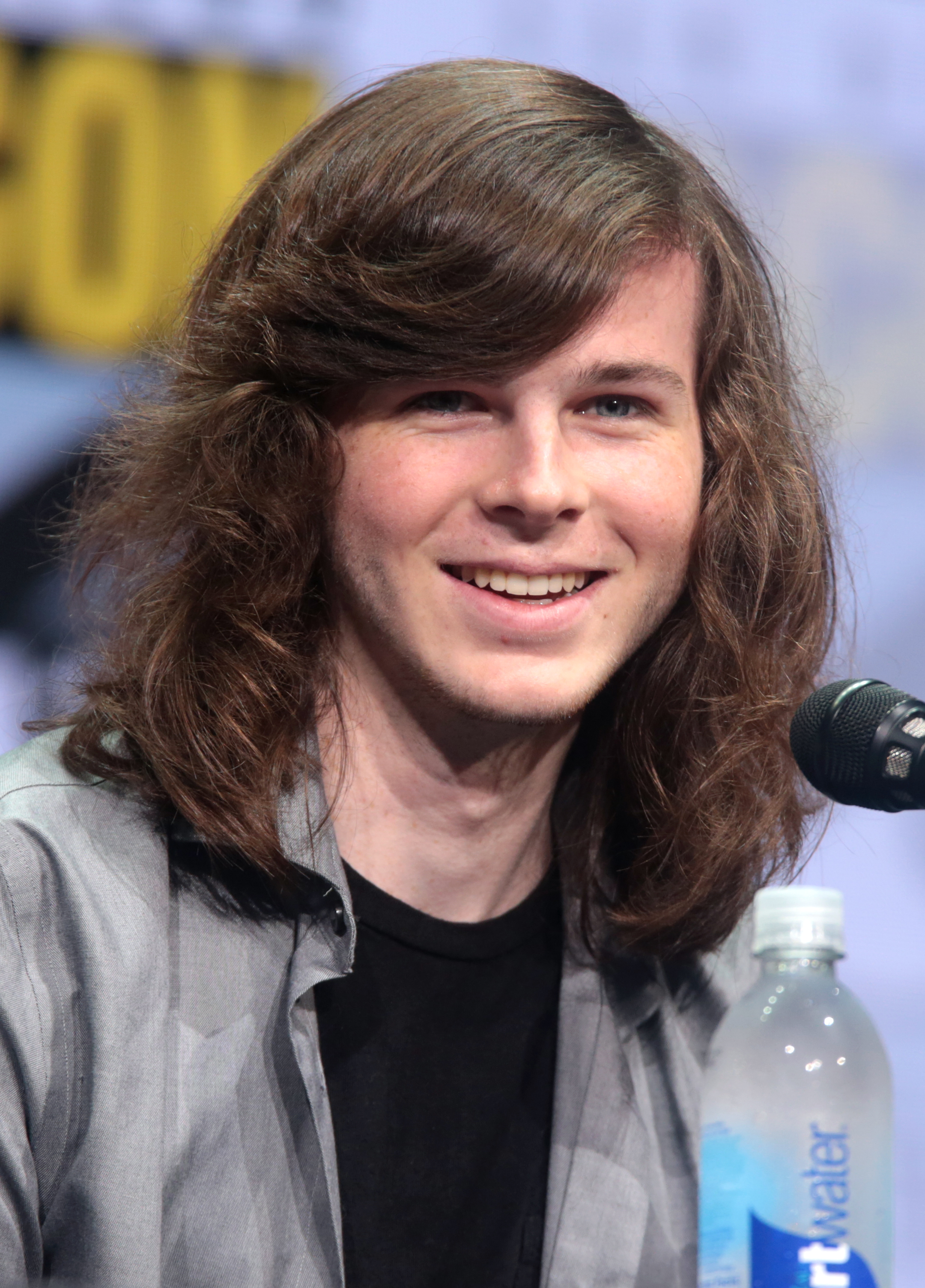
Chandler Riggs makes his final regular appearance as Carl Grimes in this episode.

The ending of the episode intercuts between Carl saying his goodbyes to Rick and Michonne, and Morgan's struggle to kill Gavin with Carol and Ezekiel attempting to talk him down. Director Greg Nicotero saw these scenes in direct contrast with each other, spending more time planning out how these two scenes would be merged. Nicotero saw Carl and Morgan's struggles mirroring each other, and had shot Carl's scenes with him on one side of the frame, and Morgan's on the other, to represent this mirroring.

== Reception ==
=== Critical reception ===
The episode received positive reviews from critics. On Rotten Tomatoes, it holds an 80% with an average rating of 7.50 out of 10, based on 30 reviews. The site's consensus reads: "Focusing on the farewell of one of the series' original characters, "Honor" delivers an emotional mid-season premiere."

=== Ratings ===
The mid-season premiere drew a total viewership of 8.28 million with a 3.6 rating in adults aged 18–49. This was an increase in viewership from the mid-season finale, which had 7.89 million viewers.
