= Mercy (The Walking Dead) =

- The Walking Dead episode
- Rick and the Militia use warning shots to call out Negan at the Sanctuary
- Episode no.: Season 8 Episode 1
- Directed by: Greg Nicotero
- Written by: Scott M. Gimple
- Cinematography by: Michael E. Satrazemis
- Editing by: Dan Liu
- Original air date: October 22, 2017
- Running time: 47 minutes

Guest appearances
- Jason Douglas as Tobin; Jordan Woods-Robinson as Eric Raleigh; Kenric Green as Scott; Dahlia Legault as Francine; Mandi Christine Kerr as Barbara; Kinsley Isla Dillon as Six Year-Old Judith; Peter Zimmerman as Eduardo; Karen Ceesay as Bertie; Jeremy Palko as Andy; Brett Gentile as Freddie; Anthony Lopez as Oscar; Cooper Andrews as Jerry; Kerry Cahill as Dianne; Daniel Newman as Daniel; Carlos Navarro as Alvaro; Jayson Warner Smith as Gavin; Traci Dinwiddie as Regina; Avi Nash as Siddiq

Episode chronology
← Previous "The First Day of the Rest of Your Life"	Next → "The Damned"
- The Walking Dead season 8

"Mercy" is the eighth season premiere of the post-apocalyptic horror television series The Walking Dead, which aired on AMC on October 22, 2017. The episode was written by Scott M. Gimple and directed by Greg Nicotero, and serves as the 100th episode overall of the series.

This episode focuses on the combined attack, involving the communities of the Alexandria Safe-Zone, the Hilltop Colony and the Kingdom, against the Sanctuary, thus starting the "All Out War" story arc. It also introduces the character Siddiq, portrayed by Avi Nash, who plays a significant role in the upcoming story arcs in the comics.

== Plot ==
The Militia, a coalition of people from the Alexandria Safe-Zone, the Hilltop Colony and the Kingdom, prepare for war in an alliance to fight the Saviors. Rick, Maggie, and King Ezekiel lead the respective communities in an assault on the Sanctuary. Meanwhile, Carol, Morgan, Tara, and Daryl lead a large horde of walkers toward the Sanctuary via controlled distractions.

Helped by directions from Dwight, the coalition takes out the Saviors mini-outposts. Shortly after, Rick's convoy arrives at the Sanctuary and simultaneously fire warning shots. Negan steps out with his lieutenants—Dwight, Simon, Gavin, Regina (Traci Dinwiddie), and Eugene. After being taunted by Negan, Rick tells the lieutenants that he will let them live if they surrender, but reminds Negan that he will kill him. After none of the lieutenants accept Rick's offer, Negan tells Rick that he lacks the numbers to win a fight against the Saviors and instructs Gregory, the leader of the Hilltop, to come out. Subsequently, Gregory steps out and asserts that the Hilltop stands with Negan, and the punishment to any Hilltop resident for fighting against the Sanctuary is banishment for the offenders and their families. Jesus, speaking for all the Hilltop soldiers there, shouts that the Hilltop "stands with Maggie", refuting Gregory's power. Infuriated, Simon, after deciding he's no longer useful, aggressively pushes Gregory down a set of stairs.

On the road, a Savior caravan unintentionally activates a tripwire and sets off an explosion, which is heard at the Sanctuary. Rick tells Negan's lieutenants to make up their minds, but they don't respond. Rick starts a countdown, but ends it early, firing at the walls and windows of the Sanctuary, creating noise to draw the incoming walkers. Negan runs off as his lieutenants run back inside for cover. In the midst of the mayhem, Rick's fighters continue to spray bullets at the Sanctuary, but eventually retreat to their cars for evacuation. With signals sent by Carol's group, Gabriel positions their RV, rigged with explosives, in front of the Sanctuary fence and exits as it continues slowly moving forward. Rick uses a garage door opener to detonate the explosives, successfully breaching the gate.

Limping, Negan takes cover behind a sheet of metal as Rick, intent on killing Negan, continues firing at him, but Gabriel urges Rick to evacuate as well, reminding him of the plan. Before he goes, Rick uses an instant camera to snap a picture of Negan at the scene. As the herd closes in on the Sanctuary, Gabriel sees a wounded Gregory and, compelled to help, pulls him to shelter. Gregory panics and takes off, driving away in the car Gabriel was to leave in. With no other way out and surrounded by walkers, Gabriel finds shelter in a box trailer, but Negan is revealed to be there too.

Interspersed throughout, the episode cuts to four different scenes, but are not established when they occur relative to present events. In one, Rick and Carl are scavenging for gas when they encounter Siddiq (Avi Nash), a man of Middle Eastern descent, rambling to himself and begging for food. Carl tries to approach him carefully, but Rick fires a warning shot, scaring him off. Carl scolds Rick, but Rick insists the man could have been a spy for Negan. Carl later returns alone and leaves food for Siddiq, while Siddiq watches him from the nearby bushes. A second scene has Rick, alone, crying to himself against a tree in a forest in the light refracted through a stained glass piece, muttering "My mercy prevails over my wrath". A third has him mourning over two gravesites at the Hilltop. In the final scene, an older, grey-haired and bearded Rick wakes up in a bed, and with a cane, walks to a living space, and happily greets Carl, Michonne and an older Judith, who leads him outside to an invigorated Alexandria preparing for a festival.

== Production ==
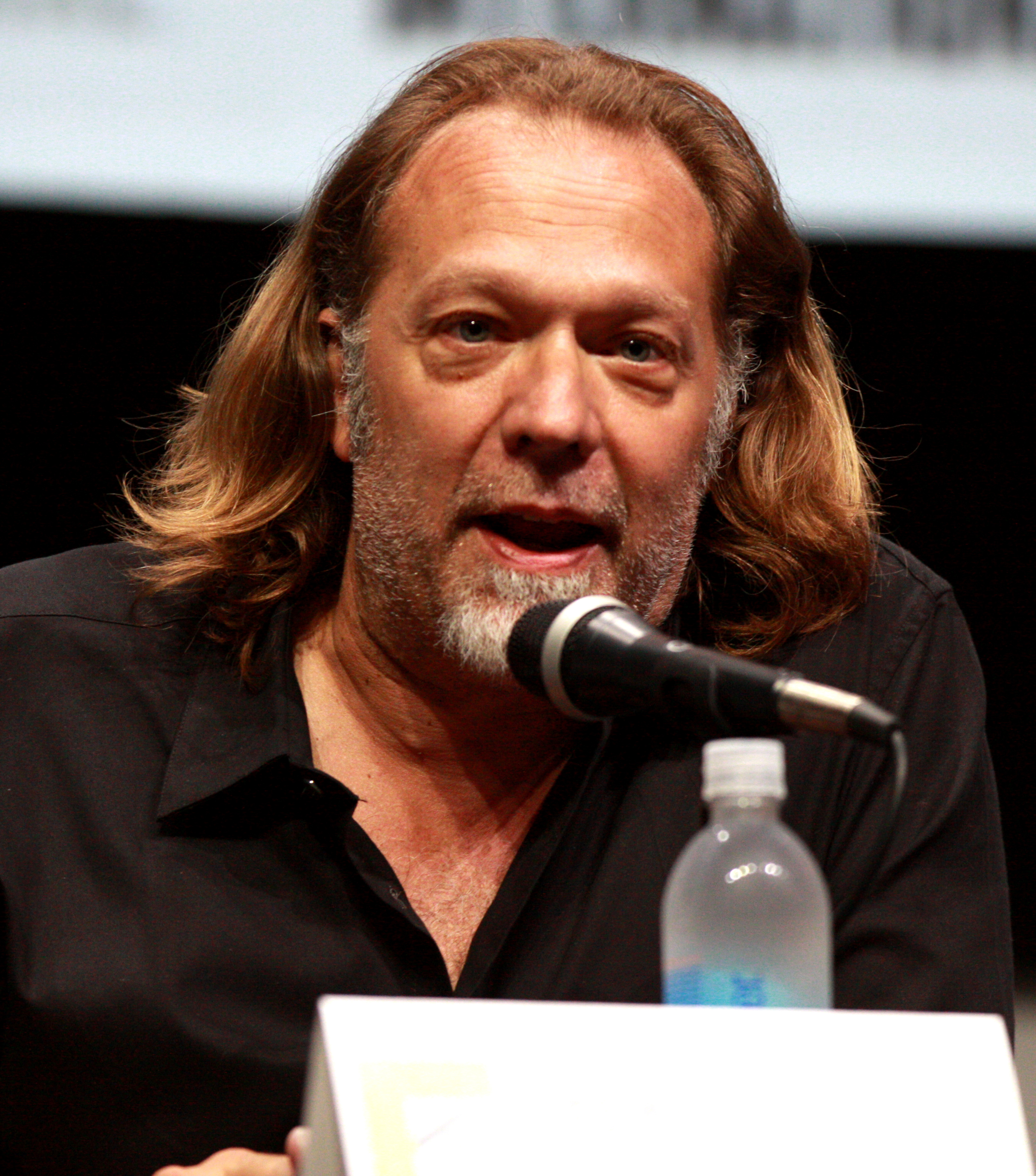
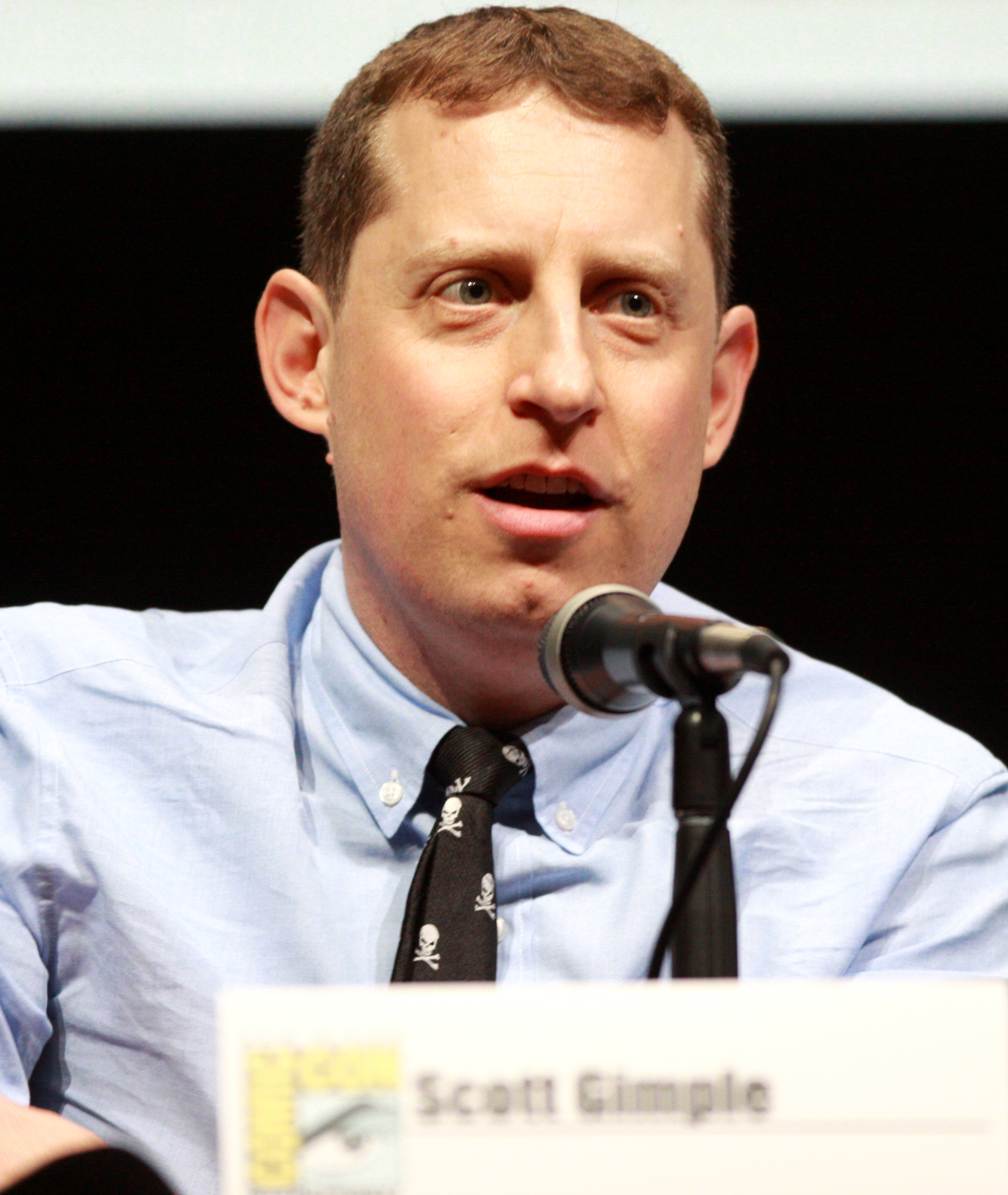
Executive producer Greg Nicotero (left) served as director of "Mercy", which was written by series showrunner and executive producer Scott M. Gimple (right)

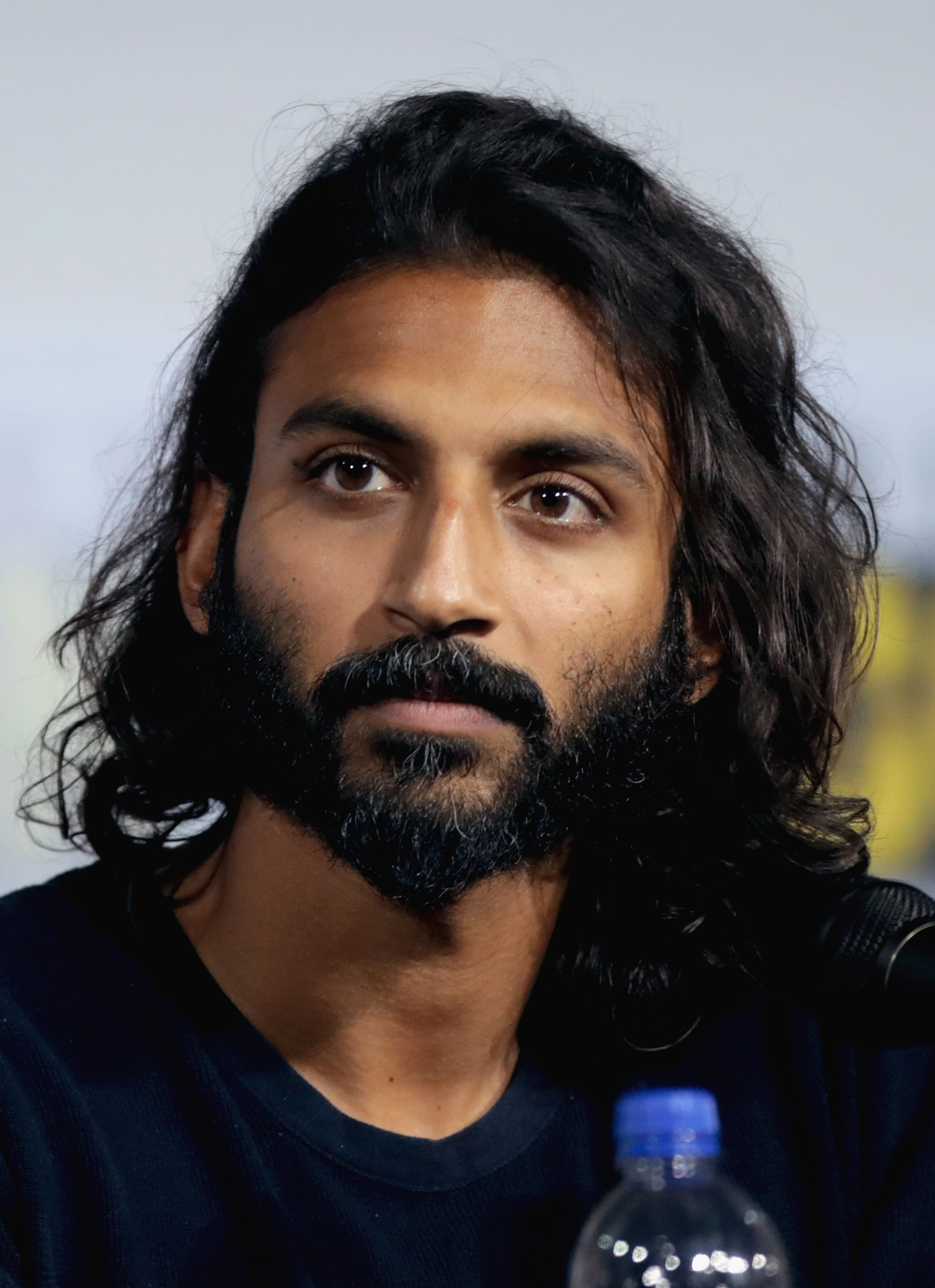
Avi Nash made his first appearance as Siddiq in the premiere episode of the eighth season

For the 100th episode, Nicotero wanted to bring callbacks from the show's premiere episode, "Days Gone Bye". The scene of Rick and Carl at the gas station was an attempt to recreate shot-for-shot the first scene of the series, though with Carl in Rick's shoes for this episode. This included the secret casting of Addy Miller, the young girl walker Rick encountered in "Days Gone Bye" but now a teenager, performing as a walker in a similar outfit. Miller's role in the scene was shot separately from Lincoln's, and she had been kept away from Lincoln during the filming, as the production crew were afraid of Lincoln spoiling this should he recognize her. The "flashforward" scenes were also filmed to mirror Rick waking up from his coma in "Days Gone Bye". Nicotero brought back Joe Giles, one of the actors that played a walker that followed Rick off a bus in Atlanta as one of walkers used by a Savior watchtower for this episode. Other easter eggs include Carl using the orange backpack that he, Rick, and Michonne collected from a dead hitchhiker from the season three episode "Clear", and Negan starting a conversation with Rick using the line "Let me ask you somethin', Rick", which Shane had frequently used in the first two seasons of the show.

The scene where the combined groups have gathered and making final preparations for the attack uses a directorial style which Nicotero called their Goodfellas' moment, where the camera pans through several small groups and picks up various conversations throughout as well as providing some visual storytelling elements. Nicotero wanted this scene to make the audience feel part of the group while also conveying a lot of information at the same time.

This episode also introduces the colored armbands to better distinguish between the residents of each of the three communities participating in the fight against the Saviors. Those fighting from Alexandria have white armbands, while those from the Hilltop have green bands and the Kingdom have orange ones.

The episode's "flashforward" to an older Rick uses the song "Another One Rides the Bus", by "Weird Al" Yankovic (a parody of "Another One Bites the Dust" by Queen). Gimple wanted a song during these scenes that was jarring for the audience and that would be something that Rick's daughter Judith would be into but would be distinctive, partially inspired by a toddler that was in Gimple's life that was obsessed with the song. He did not want a "cool" song for these scenes, and felt that with Yankovic's music, "that there's no worry about cool", making the song a perfect fit.

AMC invited a small number of journalists to watch the filming of the episode, which took place in May 2017.

The episode was dedicated to John Bernecker, a stuntman who died in an accident during filming in July 2017. It was also dedicated to filmmaker George A. Romero, known as the father of the zombie genre, who died in July 2017. Gimple said that the success of The Walking Dead "owes a great debt" to Romero.

A special two-hour Talking Dead live show was held at the Greek Theatre in Los Angeles following the broadcast of the episode as part of celebrating both the season premiere and 100th episode milestone. Along with host Chris Hardwick, all twenty of the main cast for the season and the showrunners were present along with former stars Sonequa Martin-Green (Sasha Williams), Emily Kinney (Beth Greene), Scott Wilson (Hershel Greene), IronE Singleton (T-Dog), and Michael Rooker (Merle Dixon), while Steven Yeun (Glenn Rhee) and Sarah Wayne Callies (Lori Grimes) provided video messages.

== Reception ==
=== Critical reception ===
"Mercy" received positive reviews from critics, with several critics describing the episode as a return to form for the series. On Rotten Tomatoes, it holds a 91% with an average rating of 7.34 out of 10, based on 32 reviews. The site's consensus reads: "Mercy" mixes mysterious time-hopping sequences with explosive action to create a more hopeful premiere than previous seasons of The Walking Dead.

Matt Fowler of IGN gave the episode a 7.3/10, saying in its verdict "This was a good set-up episode, but because we were only given the initial stages of this conflict, the stakes fell a bit flat."

=== Ratings ===
Initial Nielsen viewership numbers estimated that the premiere was watched by 11.44 million viewers with 6.5 million in the 18-49 age bracket, the lowest numbers that a season premiere episode of The Walking Dead had had in five years. However, it was still the most-watched programming outside of NFL games.
