= Avi Nash =

American actor

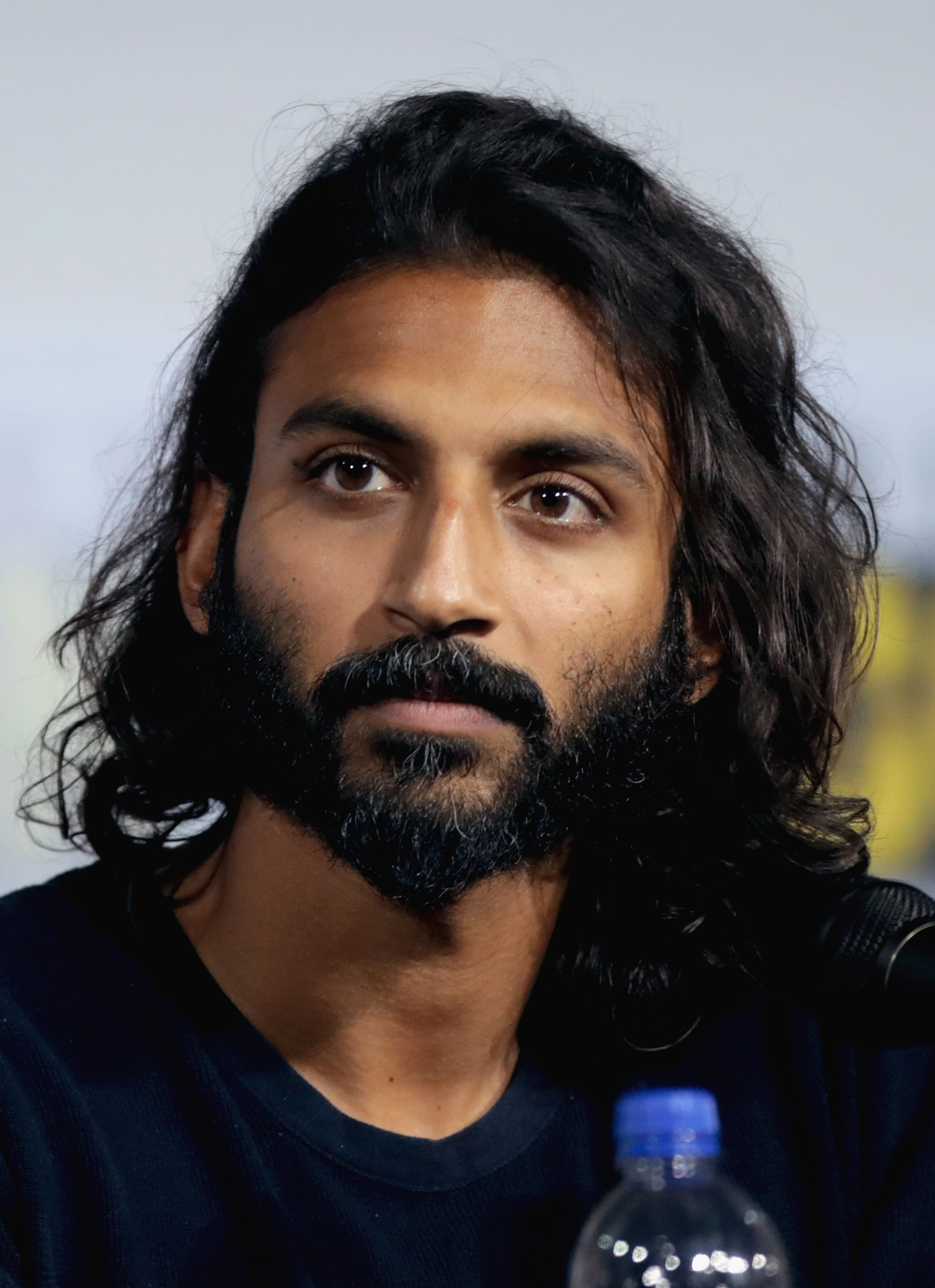
- Nash at San Diego Comic-Con in 2019
- Education: Stanford University (BS); London Academy of Music and Dramatic Art (MA)
- Occupation: Actor
- Years active: 2013–present
- Known for: The Walking Dead (2017–2020)

Avi Nash is an American actor. He played Siddiq in the AMC television series The Walking Dead (2017–2020), and Lukas Kyle in the Apple TV series Silo (since 2023).

== Life and career ==
Nash can read and write in Devanagari and Urdu. He studied Hindi at Stanford and took his acting class in India completely in Hindi. Nash learned Portuguese from his ex-girlfriend while briefly living near the Brazilian border.

=== Early life and education ===
Avi Nash's father is Indo-Guyanese and his mother is from Mumbai, India.

Nash started acting in senior year of high school due to a dare to audition for the school play; prior to this, he identified primarily as a visual artist.

Nash began attending Stanford University when he was 17 years old, performing with the Stanford Shakespeare Company. He was classmates with Young the Giant's Sameer Gadhia, who encouraged Nash to pursue acting seriously, while he himself dropped out to pursue a professional music career. After freshman year, Nash left Stanford to attend acting school under Anupam Kher at Actor Prepares in Mumbai for six months. However, he returned to Stanford to complete his degree, citing conflicting feelings between his various interests. He majored in mathematical and computational sciences, while also studying architecture.

Nash trained in theatre at the London Academy of Music and Dramatic Art in London, England. and graduated with an MA degree in 2016.

=== Career ===
Prior to acting, Nash was a cook in a closed door restaurant (puerta cerradas) that he ran out of a hostel in Buenos Aires and conducted bike tours.

He made his feature film debut in Learning to Drive alongside Sir Ben Kingsley and Patricia Clarkson, directed by Spanish director Isabel Coixet. The film premiered at the 2014 Toronto International Film Festival, where it won First Runner Up for the People’s Choice Award.

In 2017, Nash portrayed AMC's The Walking Dead's first male Muslim-American character, Siddiq, in seasons 8–10 of the show. As a result, he has attended different comic book conventions throughout the years, including Walker Stalker Convention.

== Filmography ==
=== Film ===
Year	Title	Role	Notes
2013	Life of Guy	Younger Guy	Short
2013	E-103	E-103	Short
2014	Learning to Drive	Preet	
2015	Postal Jerks	Juan	
2016	Amateur Night	Orderly	
2016	Barry	Saleem	
2019	Hosea	Henry	
2022	There There	Sam	
2023	The Braid	Camal	
2025	O Horizon	Douglas	
2026	The Weight	Singh	

=== Television ===
Year	Title	Role	Notes	Ref(s)
2015, 2019	Silicon Valley	Wajeed	2 episodes	
2017–2020	The Walking Dead	Siddiq	Recurring (season 8); Also starring (seasons 9–10); 27 episodes	
2023–present	Silo	Lukas Kyle	Main cast	
2023	Black Mirror	Krish	Episode: "Joan Is Awful"	
2026	Secret Service	Ravindra Sangvhi (Rav)	Main cast	
TBA	Disinherited		Upcoming series	
