= Something They Need =

- The Walking Dead episode
- Negan attempts to coerce Sasha to join him.
- Episode no.: Season 7 Episode 15
- Directed by: Michael Slovis
- Written by: Corey Reed
- Cinematography by: Stephen Campbell
- Editing by: Rachel Goodlett Katz; Enrique Sanchez
- Original air date: March 26, 2017
- Running time: 46 minutes

Guest appearances
- Katelyn Nacon as Enid; Jason Douglas as Tobin; Jordan Woods-Robinson as Eric Raleigh; Kenric Green as Scott; Dahlia Legault as Francine; Peter Zimmerman as Eduardo; James Chen as Kal; Anthony Lopez as Oscar; Deborah May as Natania; Sydney Park as Cyndie; Briana Venskus as Beatrice; Nicole Barré as Kathy; Mimi Kirkland as Rachel; Martinez as David

Episode chronology
| ← Previous "The Other Side" | Next → "The First Day of the Rest of Your Life" |
- The Walking Dead season 7

"Something They Need" is the fifteenth and penultimate episode of the seventh season of the post-apocalyptic horror television series The Walking Dead, which aired on AMC on March 26, 2017. The episode was written by Corey Reed and directed by Michael Slovis.

The episode focuses on Tara (Alanna Masterson) leading Rick (Andrew Lincoln) and a group of Alexandrians to Oceanside, after failing to keep her promise to Cyndie (Sydney Park), in order to retrieve guns so they can fight the Saviors. Meanwhile, Sasha (Sonequa Martin-Green) is questioned by Negan (Jeffrey Dean Morgan) and must make a heartbreaking decision.

== Plot ==
Tara informs Rick about the existence and arsenal of the Oceanside. He, Tara, and a small group set off to claim the weapons. While Rick and the others wait at the outskirts, planting an explosive to distract the Oceanside survivors, Tara sneaks into the community to face their leader, Natania, and tries to convince her to join in Rick's plan.

At Hilltop, Maggie continues to take a strong leadership position, which Gregory, its current leader, resents. When Maggie leaves the community to dig up a blueberry bush, Gregory follows her, and apologizes for his behavior towards her. He draws a knife to guard her while she digs up the bush, and contemplates using it on her. However, when walkers appear, he is unable to take action, and Maggie saves his life in time.

At the Sanctuary, Sasha has been captured and placed in a cell. A Savior, David, attempts to rape her, but Negan arrives just in time to stop the act and reminds David that rape is forbidden before killing him with a knife. Impressed with Sasha's bravery for attacking Sanctuary, Negan offers her his personal knife and gives her three options for it: kill him, commit suicide, or put down David's corpse before he re-animates as to join them as a Savior. After Negan leaves, Sasha is visited by Eugene who suggests she join the Saviors like he did, as they make him feel safe.

Back at the Oceanside community, Natania refuses to help, and after Rick's explosives goes off, she takes Tara's gun and holds her in check. As the other Oceanside residents go to check the explosion, Rick's group holds them at gunpoint, explaining his plan to face the Saviors. Natania emerges with Tara, refusing to join them, but just then, a horde of walkers drawn by the blast appears. In the confusion, Cyndie subdues Natania with a punch to the face, freeing Tara from gunpoint. Rick efficiently leads both communities into quelling the horde, but Natania still refuses to authorize her people to fight.

When Negan returns to Sasha's cell, Sasha has put down David. She tells him that he won before returning the knife. Negan informs her that he heard that Rick's group is up to no good and tomorrow will be a "big day." Distraught, Sasha pleads with Eugene to bring her a weapon, ostensibly so she can end her life. He brings her one of the poison capsules he previously made, leaving her disappointed.

Rick's group leaves with Oceanside's weapons and some of its survivors willing to help in the fight. When they return to Alexandria, Rosita informs them they have a visitor: Dwight, one of Negan's former right-hand men. Daryl attempts to attack him but Rick and the others hold him back, as Dwight states that he wants to help them.

== Reception ==
=== Critical reception ===
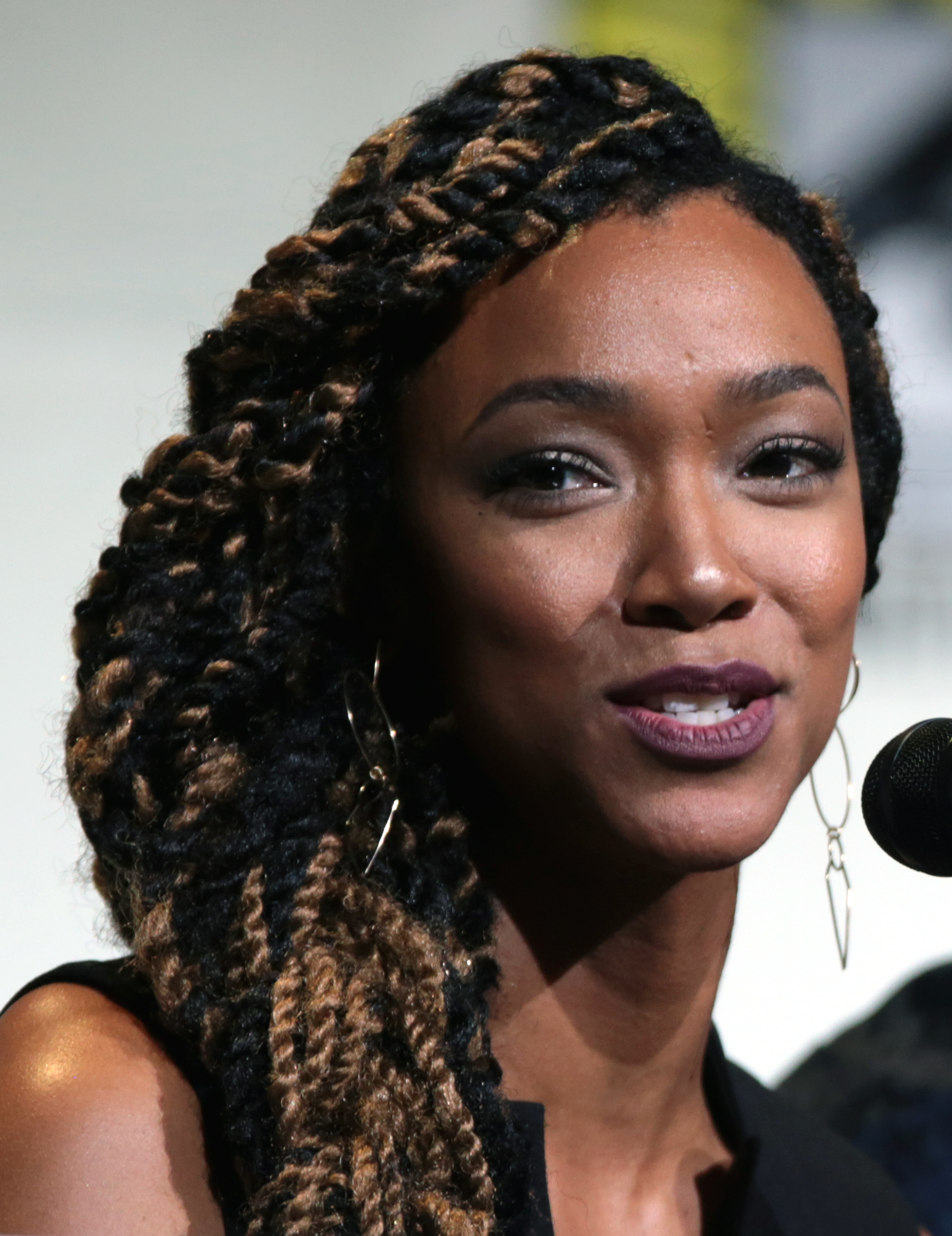
Sonequa Martin-Green received praise for her performance as Sasha in this episode.

"Something They Need" received generally positive reviews from critics. On Rotten Tomatoes, it holds a 70% with an average rating of 6.34 out of 10, based on 33 reviews. The site's consensus reads: "Something They Need" overcomes an uneven arc with humor, an upbeat pace, and a classic Walking Dead cliffhanger.

Jeff Stone for IndieWire gave it a C+ moderately positive review, but felt it was mostly "perfunctory". He felt Sasha's storyline "is the only one with any current intrigue, and that’s mostly a coin flip to see if she’ll live." He also assessed that, "At least Sasha didn’t kill herself (yet) which would be a pretty depressing anti-climax." The Independent's Jacob Stolworthy was complimentary of the old-fashioned walker set-piece. He was disappointed with the show's decision not to show Sasha's infiltration and capture in the Sanctuary, and cutting to the aftermath (spoiled by the promotional stills of the following week). He also felt Sasha's death was inevitable and said, "...it's unfortunate then that, in one of the episode's most misjudged moments Sasha's big reveal is merely heard in favour of being shown from the viewpoint of Eugene who is listening outside the door. - something of a head-scratcher."

Josh Jackson noted the return of Tara in a central role as positive. He said, "...while Alanna Masterson hasn’t been the greatest actress to grace the zombie apocalypse, I can appreciate the everywoman-ness of our bumbling hero." Shane Ryan felt he was "burned out" with the show. He was complimentary of the action at Oceanside, but levelled some criticisms. He assessed, "The plotting of it was bad, the execution was a little strange, but it was still fun because it stuck to the rules of what makes TWD good, on those rare occasions when it actually is."

Noel Murray for Rolling Stone was complimentary of the episode's table-setting. He said, "About two-thirds of the episode consists of the kind of long, dialectical scenes this show relies on far too often, as a way of killing time instead of walkers and creating the illusion of thematic depth. But here, these pieces serve more of a narrative purpose. And because they're divided across two locations, and broken up by some actually thrilling sequences elsewhere, the overall experience is more satisfying."

Sonequa Martin-Green's performance was praised. Josh Jackson felt unlike Masterson, "Sonequa Martin-Green [...] did a great job. I love the way she responded when Negan’s asked if Rick had put her up to the assassination attempt: “Rick? Your bitch? No.”" Noel Murray for Rolling Stone said, "The often-underutilized and soon-to-be-Trekkie-fan-favorite Sonequa Martin-Green has been taking full advantage of her increased screen-time over the past two weeks; she does some of her best TWD work to date when Sasha – who didn't die in her suicide raid – sits locked in a Sanctuary cell, pondering her next move." He went further on the Sasha storyline saying, "What's so remarkable about these interactions are the layers of emotions and motivations that Sasha cycles through, from fear and despair to a sense of hope when she realizes she can manipulate the mulleted gent into slipping her a weapon to "kill herself" – which she hopes to use on the big man in charge." Blair Marnell for CraveOnline felt that while it was likely it would be her final appearances on the show, they "have also been a gift to Martin-Green, as she’s never been more important to the series than she is now. In last week’s episode, Sasha had the really terrific bonding scene with Rosita. This week, Martin-Green carried most of her scenes with Negan and Eugene. She brought the life and fire to this episode, and the series will be poorer for her absence… whenever it eventually comes.

Some critics felt the characterization of the core group of survivors was off. Ron Hagan for Den of Geek! said, "Rick and Tara finally discuss the presence of the Seaside Motel group, and that means he's ready to go wage a full-fledged assault on a group of women and children, blowing up dynamite outside their walls, drawing the attention of zombies in the area, and then taking all their guns away to fight his own battle. And yes, that's the hero of the story." He was relieved that the cliffhanger involving Sasha in the previous week was not stretched out to the finale. Zack Handlen for The A.V. Club had a similar perspective on raiding Oceanside and gave the episode a C+ grade. He said, "The fact that Tara not only signed off on this plan, but also seems to be one hundred percent behind it, is at odds with everything we know about her. However much she’s supposed to believe in Rick now (and clearly, she’s supposed to believe in him a lot), for her to willingly go in on such an openly aggressive scheme is bizarre. This isn’t “we’re going to talk, and see what happens next.” This is “well, I have this hammer, so I guess this has to be another nail!”" Handlen overall assessed, "...we are forcibly reminded of The Walking Dead’s greatest weakness: Rick Must Always Be Right (except when he’s trying to fight against his destiny as a leader). The people of Oceanside almost immediately lose what little distinctive identity they once had, falling in line like they were just waiting for some bearded dude to show up and start ordering them around, and there’s no acknowledgement of the weirdness of this, of how close Rick’s tactics are to the very man he’s trying to destroy".

=== Ratings ===
The episode received a 4.9 rating in the key 18-49 demographic, with 10.54 million total viewers.
