= The Other Side (The Walking Dead) =

- The Walking Dead episode
- Sasha and Rosita travel on a secret mission.
- Episode no.: Season 7 Episode 14
- Directed by: Michael E. Satrazemis
- Written by: Angela Kang
- Cinematography by: Stephen Campbell
- Editing by: Dan Liu; Tiffany Melvin
- Original air date: March 19, 2017
- Running time: 46 minutes

Guest appearances
- Katelyn Nacon as Enid; Steven Ogg as Simon; Karen Ceesay as Bertie; R. Keith Harris as Dr. Harlan Carson; James Chen as Kal; Peter Zimmerman as Eduardo; Brett Gentile as Freddie; Ilan Srulovich as Wesley; Brian Stapf as Roy; Stephen Jones as Bike Park Savior

Episode chronology
← Previous "Bury Me Here"	Next → "Something They Need"
- The Walking Dead season 7

"The Other Side" is the fourteenth episode of the seventh season of the post-apocalyptic horror television series The Walking Dead, which aired on AMC on March 19, 2017. The episode was written by Angela Kang and directed by Michael E. Satrazemis.

The episode focuses primarily on Sasha (Sonequa Martin-Green) accompanying Rosita (Christian Serratos) on a secret mission to assassinate Negan (Jeffrey Dean Morgan) in order to avenge their late boyfriend, Abraham Ford. Elsewhere, Simon (Steven Ogg) and the Saviors pay an unexpected visit to the Hilltop with plans of taking more than just supplies.

== Plot ==
At the Hilltop, Sasha and Maggie have begun training survivors, including Enid, in the use of knives offensively in preparation for the imminent war against the Saviors. Surprising everyone, Simon and a crew of Saviors raid the community, forcing Daryl and Maggie to hide in the cellar. Aware of the Saviors' arrival, Sasha packs her bag and takes Rosita to a secret escape hatch that passes beneath the perimeter wall. After sneaking out of the Hilltop, both rebels begin to carry out their secret mission.

During the raid, a Savior walks toward the cellar doors. Enid desperately tries to distract him away from the basement, but he proceeds to enter the cellar. As Daryl readies his knife to attack the Savior searches the cellar, but soon leaves with some supplies and shuts the door. Once he's gone, Maggie remarks to Daryl that he hasn't spoken a word to her ever since he returned to the Hilltop. Crying, Daryl apologizes to Maggie for Glenn's death. Maggie resolutely maintains Daryl wasn't to blame, saying that Glenn knew Daryl was "good", and that nearly killing a Savior unnecessarily would only have detracted from the bigger goal — winning the war; they embrace. Eventually, the Saviors leave with Dr. Harlan Carson in tow, as their new doctor, so that he can replace his now-deceased brother, Emmett Carson, who was burned alive inside a furnace after being thrown in by Negan for a false confession. The Hilltop residents gather at the gates and watch the Saviors leave with Dr. Carson. Gregory, sensing their disappointment, shifts around uncomfortably as he continues to lose credibility as a leader.

Situating themselves in an empty building near the Sanctuary, Sasha and Rosita set up a sniper's nest. While waiting, they bond over their purpose and past events. At night, Sasha and Rosita attempt to sneak into the Sanctuary, where they encounter Eugene from the other side of a fence. They urge Eugene to come with them and escape, but he refuses. He tells them to go away and heads back inside the compound; Rosita curses at Eugene in disappointment. At Sasha's suggestion, Rosita keeps watch as Sasha slips through the fence, but doesn't notice Sasha using a lock to close the opening behind her so that she can lock Rosita out. Despite Rosita's protest, Sasha explains to her that it isn't her "time" and that Alexandria still needs her. Leaving Rosita behind, Sasha breaks into the Sanctuary, kills another Savior in the process, and runs through an open door, to kill Negan herself. As gunfire breaks out, Rosita flees and sobs in frustration after she hears Saviors approaching, but eventually stops to catch her breath and notices a dark figure, holding a crossbow, watching her from a small distance.

== Production ==
The episode largely focuses on Sasha (Sonequa Martin-Green) and Rosita (Christian Serratos). Martin-Green commented on Sasha's sacrifice as symbolic of the themes of the season saying, "I think so many of us have realized that the only fight worth fighting is one for the future. Our value of life has expanded beyond concern for ourselves. We're leaders of this world and we're building a future for us, for our children and hopefully our children's children. Regardless of the sacrifice. It's a prevailing theme of the back half of the season and I think it's an astounding truth." She said, "Rosita is needed elsewhere. There has to be a point to these sacrifices, as I say to her, and there would be no point for her to join me when this is my path alone to take. It was definitely emotional, but there was joy there too, the joy that comes from reconciliation and the joy that comes from stepping into what you believe is your purpose." Serratos mentioned the bonding scene between Rosita and Sasha was the most dialogue she ever had on the show. On Rosita's backstory, she commented, "She knew that what she had to offer was her appearance and that it could benefit her if she chose to utilize it, and that’s what she did to survive. And I thought that was just really cool, and the fact that she was doing it 10 times better than all these dudes is a really cool message."

The episode also features the re-appearance of Maggie (Lauren Cohan), who has been absent for four consecutive episodes and was last seen briefly in "Rock in the Road." This episode also is the first to address the sexual orientation of Jesus. Actor Tom Payne promised “he is the same as he is the comic books in that regard,” and later said, “I was excited to first establish Jesus as a kick-ass ninja, then have the fact that he happens to be gay dropped in later. The way it’s done is subtle. It’s a small moment.”

== Reception ==
=== Critical reception ===
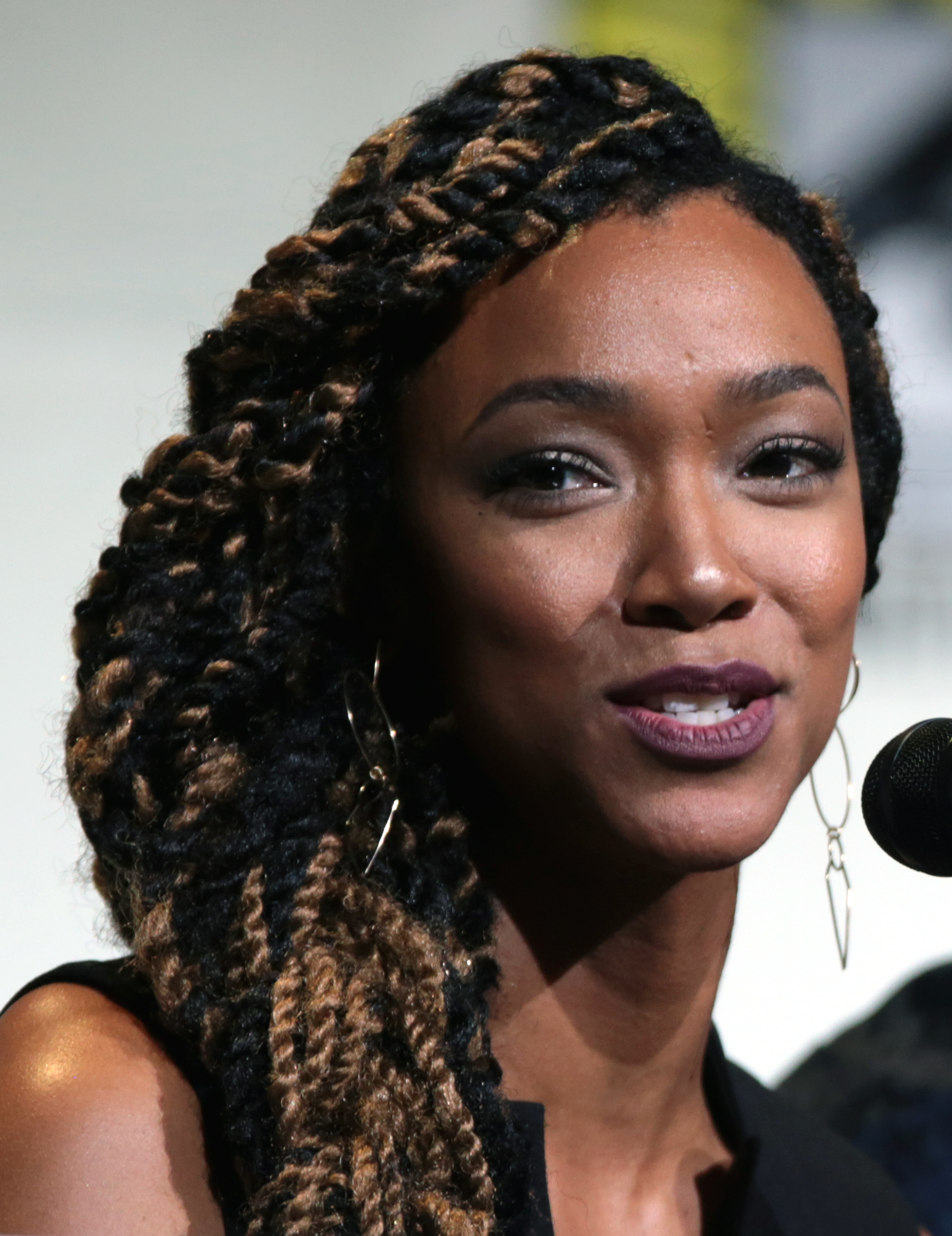
The scenes involving Sasha (Sonequa Martin-Green) (pictured) were noted as highlights, but most critics felt Sasha's decision to sacrifice herself to save Rosita (Christian Serratos) was manufactured.

"The Other Side" received generally positive reviews from critics. On Rotten Tomatoes, it holds a 69% with an average rating of 6.0 out of 10, based on 29 reviews. The site's consensus reads: "The Other Side" delves into the sorrowful aftermath of losing key characters with a slow-building narrative that gathers speed—and gains power—along the way.

Writing for Forbes, Erik Kain appreciated the focus on Sasha and Maggie, despite it being more of a "Sasha and Rosita" episode. He was critical of the decision to go with Rosita's plan rather than Sasha's plan "to use the sniper rifle to actually, you know, snipe Negan from a distance" rather than Rosita's insistence to "go inside the gate. Because I guess you need a sniper rifle for close quarters combat." Kain was critical of Sasha's decision to save Rosita saying, "If the show had really explained that Rosita was this awesome, essential part of group, I'd be more inclined to agree with Sasha's decision. As it stands, Sasha seems just as integral to the group as Rosita. It makes as little sense as Sasha agreeing to Rosita's plan in the first place, when the sniper plan is so much better. And it just plain sucks that the better character is waltzing off to certain death, while one of the show's worst characters (at least lately) is safe." He appreciated that Eugene turned out to be "the True Coward" rather than "a wolf in sheep's clothing."

Writing for Entertainment Weekly, Nick Romano gave the episode a "B" grade. He felt the moment where Sasha sacrificed herself and told Rosita to flee was a bit "forced" and felt that, "By all accounts, she seemed like she wanted to live." He liked the bonding scene between Sasha and Rosita, and felt that, "A moment like this was needed for Rosita, who’s been frustrating to watch for some time as she makes reckless decision after reckless decision."

Writing for The A.V. Club, Zack Handlen gave the episode a "B−" grade. He commented that the episode "manages something I thought was nearly impossible at this point: it made me care about Rosita and Sasha’s friendship. Rosita’s become something of a drag of late, as her rage and self-loathing have made her tediously one note. Her interactions with Sasha, in which she never bothers to hide her resentment over Abraham, have been the worst of it. Sasha is less irritating, but she hasn’t had a lot to do other than mourn and plot revenge against Negan. Thankfully, by the end of this episode, both women felt a little closer to actual people again. It’s a simple trick—they bond over attempted murder and a list of Rosita’s ex-boyfriends—but an effective one." However, he was critical of the timing it took to get to the emotional payoff of the episode. He praised Eugene's allegiance to Negan and its pay off, as well as Sasha's decision to leave Rosita behind, calling it a "nice twist" with "horrible, horrible consequences".

Metro's Adam Starkey praised the episode, calling it "an effectively emotional build with some standout performances", enjoying the comfort moments between Sasha and Rosita.

Jacob Stolworthy of The Independent praised the episode. He said "what makes this episode work on a wavelength most episodes this season have failed to is through the weaving in of the very plot points the writers have taken time to flesh out; viewer’s patience continues to be rewarded. Take, for instance, both Sasha and Rosita - they’re both seeking to avenge the death of the man they both loved and, while this has made them more adversary than ally previously, we see them learn to find respect for each other with inevitable death approaching (more on that below)." He praised the scene between Daryl and Maggie, complimenting Reedus and Cohan's performances. Stolworthy also noted the impact of Sasha's decision to face Negan alone. He said, "In a series where the moustachioed soldier's death was - somewhat understandably - overshadowed by original character Glenn (Steven Yeun), this moment feels like the Abe tribute he's deserved for some time now."

Jeff Stone of IndieWire gave the episode a "B" grade. He felt that the episode was "an excuse to give Rosita some semblance of character development, something she’s been sorely lacking over her four seasons on the show. It’s also mostly set-up for a cliffhanger to lead us into the final two episodes. It’s serviceable on both counts." He also questioned Sasha's actions, believing it to be "manufactured and under-motivated (like Morgan’s turn last episode), since Sasha never seemed to have much of a martyr complex, and her major character beat in the series so far was finding a way back from the brink after she became suicidal back in Season 5."

Noam Cohen of New York Observer was more negative of the episode, saying, "When it decides to slow down to give us character-centric vignettes, rather than letting their personalities and emotions emerge from their involvement in the plot, it starts to lag, and feel like a lot like filler."

=== Ratings ===
The episode received a 4.7 rating in the key 18-49 demographic, with 10.32 million total viewers.
