= Hearts Still Beating =

- The Walking Dead episode
- Reunited, Rick and Daryl embrace.
- Episode no.: Season 7 Episode 8
- Directed by: Michael E. Satrazemis
- Written by: Matthew Negrete; Channing Powell
- Cinematography by: Stephen Campbell
- Editing by: Avi Youabian
- Original air date: December 11, 2016
- Running time: 60 minutes

Guest appearances
- Katelyn Nacon as Enid; Ann Mahoney as Olivia; Jason Douglas as Tobin; Jordan Woods-Robinson as Eric Raleigh; Kenric Green as Scott; Karl Makinen as Richard; Peter Zimmerman as Eduardo; Elizabeth Ludlow as Arat; Mike Seal as Gary; Martinez as David; Joshua Hoover as Joseph; Lindsley Register as Laura; Aerli Austen as Isabelle

Episode chronology
← Previous "Sing Me a Song"	Next → "Rock in the Road"
- The Walking Dead season 7

"Hearts Still Beating" is the eighth episode and mid-season finale of the seventh season of the post-apocalyptic horror television series The Walking Dead, which aired on AMC on December 11, 2016. The episode was written by Matthew Negrate and Channing Powell, and directed by Michael E. Satrazemis.

The episode mainly focuses on Negan's (Jeffrey Dean Morgan) unwelcome and unexpected visit to Alexandria as other members scavenge for supplies; with tensions high, things quickly spin out of control. It also features the final appearances of Olivia (Ann Mahoney) and Spencer Monroe (Austin Nichols). His death was adapted from Issue #111 of the comic book series.

== Plot ==
At the Hilltop, Gregory warns Maggie not to let her growing popularity with the Hilltop residents go to her head. Maggie cannot locate Jesus and Sasha lies about his whereabouts, knowing he is looking for the Saviors' home, the Sanctuary.

At Alexandria, Negan tries to bond with Carl and Judith while their father, Rick and Aaron retrieve supplies from an abandoned houseboat floating in the middle of a walker-infested river, as part of their offering to the Saviors. Among the supplies are numerous guns, but no ammo, along with a vulgar note which contains a drawn middle finger and the words, "CONGRATS FOR WINNING BUT YOU STILL LOSE!!!!", left by the previous owner sardonically congratulating them on their prize. They return to Alexandria, unaware they were watched by a man with mismatched boots. The three Saviors: Gary, David,& Laura guarding the gate check over the supplies and the trio discover the vulgar note, believing it was written by Rick and Aaron for them in which they furiously confront the duo. Aaron attempts to apologize to them while truthfully denying the fact that they have no idea who left it, but the Saviors angrily beat him up as punishment for insulting and disrespecting them in which Rick is unable to intervene.

At the Kingdom, Richard, a member of their military, pays Carol a visit inside her cottage, though Morgan is also there. Richard tries to persuade them both to have King Ezekiel consider fighting the Saviors, as he fears they may in fact kill them even if they continue to obey their demands. They debate and both staunchly refuse; Richard dejectedly leaves.

At the Sanctuary, with help from an anonymous source, Daryl is able to sneak out of his cell to a waiting motorcycle to escape. He encounters Fat Joey and bludgeons him to death with a pipe. Jesus finds Daryl and, together, they leave the compound, with Daryl recovering Rick's signature .357 Colt Python revolver from Joey's corpse. Nearby, Michonne has abducted a Savior woman named Isabelle and demands she show her the Sanctuary. The woman directs her to a nearby hill where Michonne sees that there are vast numbers of Saviors, more than they initially thought. The woman states it would be pointless to fight them and it would be better to just take the car and dump it, then adds that there is a silencer in the glove compartment. After a moment, Michonne kills her, dumps the body, and drives back to Alexandria.

Spencer, who has a vendetta against Rick, approaches Negan and proposes to talk. A pool table is set up outside and a crowd gathers, and as Negan plays, Spencer explains that Negan should name him as leader of Alexandria over Rick, since he will readily acquiesce to Negan's demands. Negan considers this, approaches Spencer and explains that unlike Rick, he has no guts and proceeds to disembowel him. Enraged, Rosita fires the single bullet that Eugene had made at Negan, but it strikes "Lucille", his bat. Savior Arat subdues Rosita while Negan demands to know who made the bullet. When Rosita lies and claims she did, Negan tells Arat to kill someone. Arat chooses and kills Olivia. By then, the gunfire has drawn Rick along with a battered Aaron to the scene and he tries to confront Negan. Negan reminds him of his deal that no Alexandrian can have a firearm and Olivia's death was the penalty for disobedience. Eugene fearfully admits he made the bullet. Negan and the Saviors take their leave, taking Eugene with them despite Rosita's tearful protests to take her instead. That night, Michonne convinces Rick that they must fight back against the Saviors and Rick finally accepts.

The next day, Rick, Michonne, Carl, Rosita, and Tara show up at the Hilltop, reuniting with Maggie, Sasha, and Enid in which Rick apologizes to Maggie for not listening to her on getting ready to fight Negan. As they plan, Daryl and Jesus return to everyone's surprise. Rick and Daryl embrace, and Daryl returns his gun to him. The group makes plans to go to war with the Saviors.

At Alexandria that night, Father Gabriel keeps watch, unaware that the same figure with mismatched boots watches him from afar.

== Reception ==
=== Critical reception ===
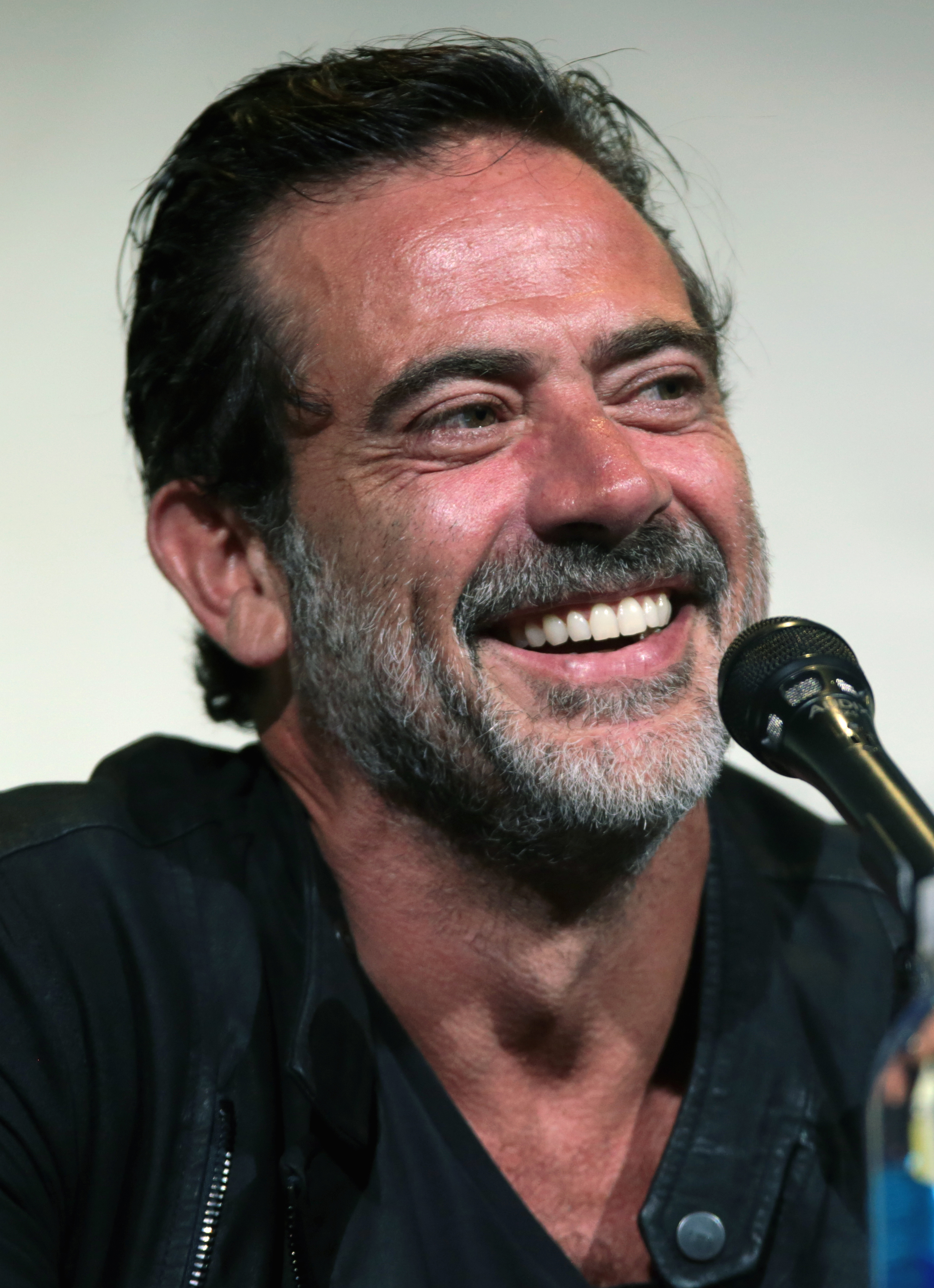
Jeffrey Dean Morgan received praise for his performance as Negan in this episode.

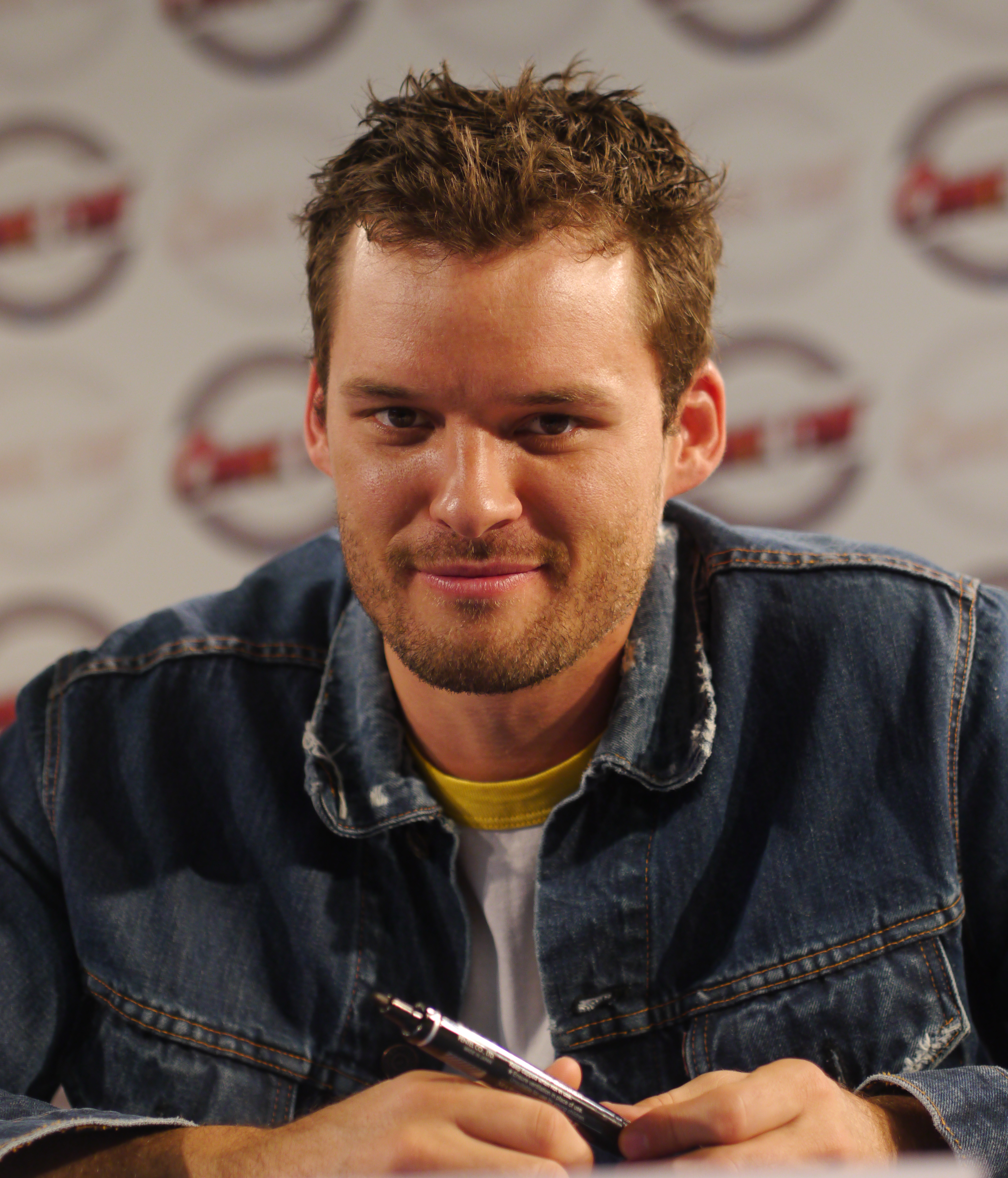
Austin Nichols made his final regular appearance as Spencer Monroe in this episode.

"Hearts Still Beating" received generally positive reviews from critics. On Rotten Tomatoes, it holds a 78% with an average rating of 7.44 out of 10, based on 32 reviews. The site's consensus reads: "Hearts Still Beating" corrects course after a frustrating first half to The Walking Dead's seventh season, using an improved pace and some welcome narrative jolts to set up a hopeful, rousing conclusion.

=== Ratings ===
The episode received a 5.1 rating in the key 18-49 demographic with 10.58 million total viewers.
