= Service (The Walking Dead) =

- The Walking Dead episode
- Negan enters Alexandria for his first visit.
- Episode no.: Season 7 Episode 4
- Directed by: David Boyd
- Written by: Corey Reed
- Cinematography by: Michael E. Satrazemis
- Editing by: Dan Liu
- Original air date: November 13, 2016
- Running time: 60 minutes

Guest appearances
- Katelyn Nacon as Enid; Ann Mahoney as Olivia; Jason Douglas as Tobin; Jordan Woods-Robinson as Eric Raleigh; Kenric Green as Scott; Ted Huckabee as Bruce; Dahlia Legault as Francine; Mandi Christine Kerr as Barbara; David Marshall Silverman as Kent; Vanessa Cloke as Anna; Martinez as David; Elizabeth Ludlow as Arat; Mike Seal as Gary; Robert Walker-Branchaud as Neil

Episode chronology
← Previous "The Cell"	Next → "Go Getters"
- The Walking Dead season 7

"Service" is the fourth episode of the seventh season of the post-apocalyptic horror television series The Walking Dead, which aired on AMC on November 13, 2016. The episode was written by Corey Reed and directed by David Boyd.

The episode focuses on the remaining members of the core group holding together in Alexandria, while mourning the deaths of Glenn and Abraham, but Negan (Jeffrey Dean Morgan) and the Saviors show up early at their gates for their first offering.

== Plot ==
At Alexandria, Michonne takes a hidden sniper rifle and leaves for a field, with a burnt-out car, to practice with the weapon. A walker eventually approaches and she misses it several times, and eventually decapitates it with her katana. She finds one of her stray bullets hit a deer, and she carries it back to Alexandria.

Meanwhile, Negan and his Saviors, including a captive Daryl, arrive earlier than expected to collect half of Alexandria's supplies. Rick says they have already set out half of their supplies, but Negan retorts that he gets to determine what they take, as they are providing a "service" to the community. He orders his Saviors to search the homes, taking their beds. Dwight forces Rosita and Spencer to collect Daryl's motorcycle from the nearby woods. While outside of Alexandria, Spencer expresses his concern that Rick is not more accepting of Negan's rule. Rosita recovers a gun from the undead corpse of a Savior and they find Daryl's bike.

As they wait, Negan taunts Rick over video footage taken from when Rick's group first arrived in Alexandria, and asks to see the "sick girl" Maggie. Gabriel appears and asks if Negan would like to pay his respects to her, tricking him into believing Maggie is dead. Their conversation is broken by a gunshot, and they congregate at the community's infirmary. There, Carl holds a Savior named David at gunpoint due to the man taking too much of the medicine away from them along with another Savior as well. Negan is impressed by Carl's bravery but forces him to stand down otherwise he will kill someone to prove a point to them again in which Carl complies at once, and then Negan demands to see the armory, as Alexandria seems to have a lot of guns. After Olivia shows Negan around the armory, he instructs them to turn over all the guns, including those that Rick's group had stolen from one of his outposts. As the Saviors load the guns on their trucks, they find two listed in the inventory missing, and Negan threatens to kill Olivia if they aren't returned. Rick and the other Alexandria survivors search through the homes to find them, and Rick discovers them, along with a stash of food, hidden in Spencer's home.

With all the guns collected, the Saviors prepare to leave when Rick sees Michonne hiding in one of the dilapidated houses outside. He begs Negan for a moment, and goes to the house and convinces Michonne to turn over the rifle, which was not in the inventory, and the deer for the better good despite her protests. Appreciative of Rick's effort, Negan warns Rick that if they catch any Alexandrian with a gun, they will kill them. Rick asks if Daryl can stay, but when Negan tells Daryl to plead his case, he remains obstinately silent.

After the Saviors leave with Daryl in tow, Rick accuses Spencer of hoarding supplies, while Spencer taunts Rick for his failure as a leader then afterwards, is confronted by an infuriated Rosita upon learning that he had guns hidden and that she spent wasting time finding on one gun when he had them in her need of bullets. Later, Michonne attempts to encourage Rick to fight. Rick tells her he cannot. He explains that he knows that Judith is not his daughter but that of his friend, but loves her anyway, and similarly with Alexandria, they need to accept Negan's rule to keep living. The following day, while outside Alexandria in the same field, Michonne finds all the mattresses that the Saviors took burned in a pile by the road.

At night, Rosita finds and picks up an empty shell casing that Negan had fired earlier. She visits Eugene and requests he make her a bullet for the gun she still has.

== Reception ==
=== Critical reception ===
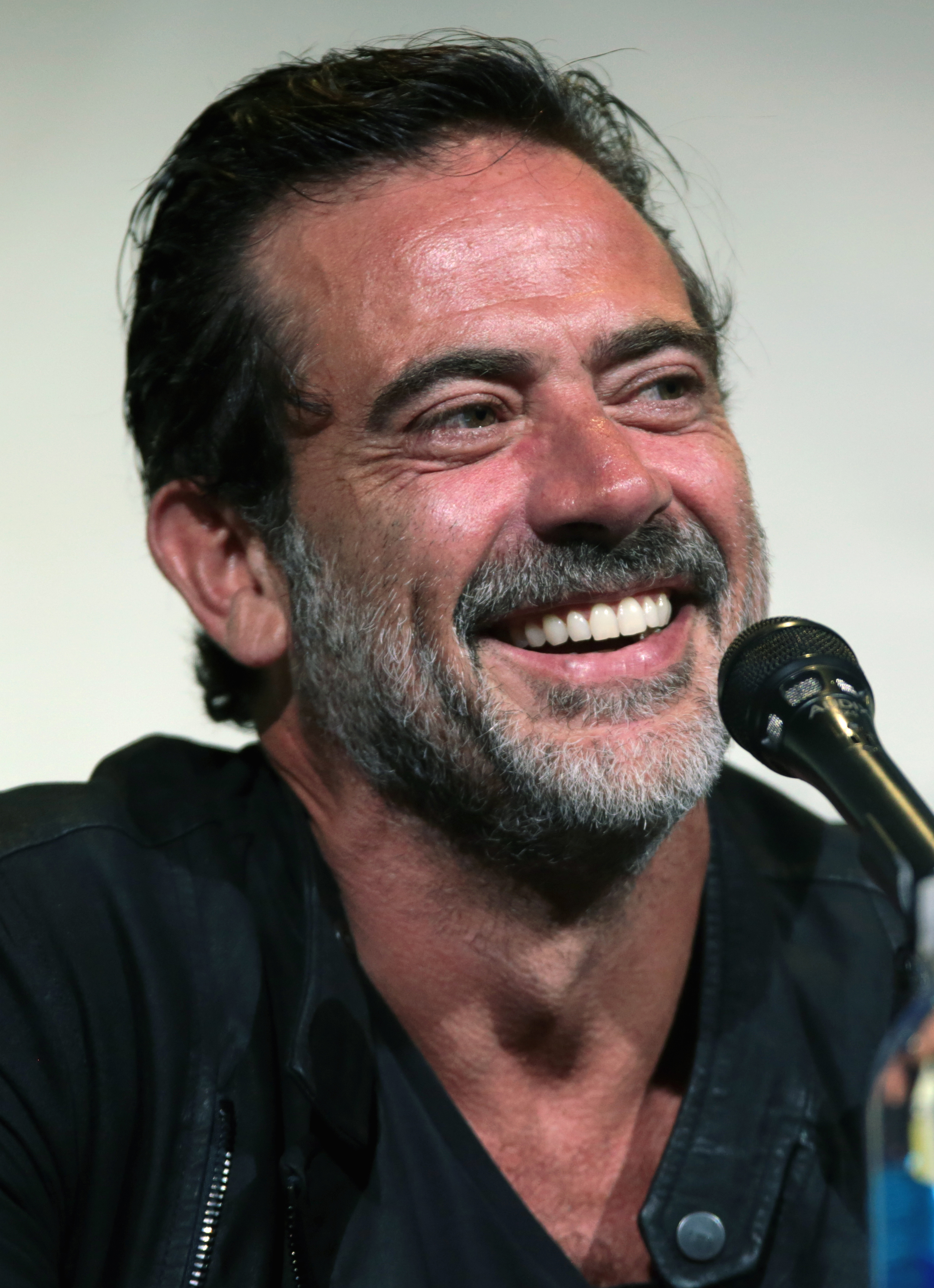
Jeffrey Dean Morgan received positive reviews for his performance while the development of Negan received mixed reviews in this episode.

"Service" received mixed reviews from critics. On Rotten Tomatoes, it holds a 62% with an average rating of 6.94 out of 10, based on 34 reviews. The site's consensus reads: Though the pace is slower than desired, "Service" systematically sets a foundation for a frightening future while furthering the story of life under Negan's rule.

Kelly Lawler of USA Today reviewed the episode, saying, "Jeffrey Dean Morgan's villain is still just as boring, just as non-threatening as he was before. An extra-long episode that was basically just the IKEA trip from Hell doesn't really do anything to further his character." Erik Kain of Forbes also reviewed the episode, saying, "All told, this was the weakest episode of the season so far by a long shot. I hope the showrunners tighten things up going forward, and give us more action, more intertwined storylines, and less Negan and his endless chatter."

=== Ratings ===
The episode received a 5.4 rating in the key 18-49 demographic with 11.40 million total viewers. At the time, it was the lowest rating the show had since "Dead Weight" from season four.
