= Go Getters =

- The Walking Dead episode
- Jesus and Sasha watch as Maggie helps defend the Hilltop Colony from walkers.
- Episode no.: Season 7 Episode 5
- Directed by: Darnell Martin
- Written by: Channing Powell
- Cinematography by: Stephen Campbell
- Editing by: Avi Youabian
- Original air date: November 20, 2016
- Running time: 44 minutes

Guest appearances
- Katelyn Nacon as Enid; Steven Ogg as Simon; R. Keith Harris as Dr. Harlan Carson; James Chen as Kal; Peter Zimmerman as Eduardo

Episode chronology
← Previous "Service"	Next → "Swear"
- The Walking Dead season 7

"Go Getters" is the fifth episode of the seventh season of the post-apocalyptic horror television series The Walking Dead, which aired on AMC on November 20, 2016. The episode was written by Channing Powell and directed by Darnell Martin.

The episode focuses on Maggie (Lauren Cohan) and Sasha (Sonequa Martin-Green) saddled with grief as they find safety at the Hilltop Colony. However, Simon (Steven Ogg) and a crew of Saviors unexpectedly show up at the Hilltop to confront Gregory (Xander Berkeley). Concurrently, Carl (Chandler Riggs) and Enid (Katelyn Nacon) journey to the same community.

== Plot ==
At the Hilltop Colony, Maggie awakes inside the medical trailer of Dr. Harlan Carson. He informs her that she suffered from abruptio placentae—a separation of the placenta from the uterus—but that the baby is fine. Dr. Carson also advises her to rest and remain at the Hilltop for the duration of her pregnancy. At Maggie's request, Sasha takes her to where Glenn and Abraham are buried. There, Maggie places Glenn's pocket watch, a gift to him from her father, Hershel, on his grave as a marker, and is provided flowers by Jesus. Since Maggie's people didn't wipe out all the Saviors, Gregory, leader of the Hilltop, arrives and demands that she must leave immediately, despite Maggie's condition. Jesus tries to reason with Gregory, but he demands they be gone by morning so that he has plausible deniability that he colluded to take down the Saviors' satellite outpost. Maggie and Sasha are then given temporary quarters by Jesus, who apologizes for Gregory. Sasha asks Jesus to convince Gregory to change his mind and offers to earn Maggie's keep by scavenging for the Hilltop.

Back in Alexandria, not long after the Saviors' first visit to the community for their offering, Rick tries convincing Carl to join him on a supply run for the Saviors, but Carl refuses to bow down. Rick then hands Michonne a walkie-talkie and departs Alexandria with Aaron. Carl later spots Enid leaving the community by scaling the perimeter wall. Having learned of Glenn and Abraham's death, Enid is eager to see Maggie at the Hilltop. Carl shows up and tells her she shouldn't go, but that he won't stop her, and she leaves. Later that day, Enid is approached by a walker as she rides a bike down an empty road. Suddenly, a car rams into the walker and crashes into a nearby post. Enid finds Carl behind the steering wheel; the two then walk together toward the Hilltop.

In the middle of the night, Maggie and Sasha wake up after hearing music. They see fires blazing outside; music blares from a parked car. The Hilltop's gates are wide open and walkers flood in through the front gate, drawn by the music. The two then take action to defend the Hilltop. Jesus helps Sasha kill walkers; Gregory watches from his window. Sasha tries to stop the music, but finds the car sealed off with metal grates and a memento which is the car lock in the form of a middle finger from the Saviors, who are behind the attack. Suddenly, Maggie drives a large tractor into the courtyard, incidentally crushing some walkers while she continues on to the car, destroying it and putting a stop to the music.

The next day, Gregory thanks Maggie and Sasha for saving the Hilltop, but still refuses to let them stay. They're then interrupted by the sound of vehicles arriving in the courtyard; Simon leads a group of Saviors into the Hilltop. Jesus quickly hides the women in the foyer closet on Gregory's orders. Simon and his men stride into the mansion where they are greeted by Gregory. In private, Gregory tells Simon that he received the message "loud and clear" from the previous night. It is then explained by Simon that they unleashed the walkers on the Hilltop to remind its residents that walkers are still a threat and the Saviors provide a great service by killing them. He then informs Gregory that the Saviors at the outpost were killed; Gregory pretends this is news to him. The Hilltop's leader then leads Simon to the foyer closet and opens it with the intention of handing over Maggie and Sasha. Instead, Gregory finds boxes of scotch whisky and offers Simon a bottle as part of the Hilltop's tribute to the Saviors; Simon accepts, taking the entire box though. On his way out, Simon orders Gregory to kneel, which he does with little resistance; the Saviors depart.

As the Saviors are loading their trucks, Carl and Enid reach the Hilltop. Enid then realizes that Carl left Alexandria not to accompany her, but to track down Negan and kill him. She asks Carl not to go, but he sticks to his mission; they share a kiss. Carl then sneaks aboard one of the trucks. Back in the mansion, Jesus releases Maggie and Sasha from Gregory's bedroom closet. Gregory chastises Jesus for hiding them there instead of the foyer closet, but Jesus stands up to Gregory and forces him to let Maggie and Sasha stay. Jesus then threatens to reveal Gregory's deal with Alexandria, stripping him of his plausible deniability. When Gregory says that the Saviors can be reasonable, Maggie, enraged to hear him say this about the people who butchered her husband, punches Gregory in the face. Maggie then reaches into his pocket and takes Glenn's pocket watch, which Gregory stole from the grave. She finally tells Gregory that the Hilltop is her home now and to remember her name: Maggie Rhee. Later, Sasha discreetly asks Jesus if he can find out where the Sanctuary, the Saviors' headquarters, is located; Jesus accepts. Maggie later finds Enid sitting at Glenn's grave; they hug. Afterward, Enid cooks dinner for Maggie in Jesus' trailer; Sasha joins them. Maggie gives the pocket watch to Enid, saying they don't need objects to remember the dead. The three then sit around the table, take each other's hands, and pray. As the Saviors leave the Hilltop, Jesus sneaks into one of the trucks that's bound for their compound. Once aboard, he is surprised and greeted by Carl amidst the cargo.

== Reception ==
=== Critical reception ===
"Go Getters" received generally positive reviews from critics. On Rotten Tomatoes, it holds a 74% with an average rating of 6.42 out of 10, based on 39 reviews. The site's consensus reads: Though lacking significant plot progression, "Go Getters" presents a satisfying female perspective, strong character choices, and a rare glimmer of hope.

Entertainment Weekly's Nick Romano had "found the return trip to the Hilltop colony to be one of the more enjoyable episodes". Erik Kain of Forbes wrote: "Sunday night's episode of The Walking Dead may be the worst episode ever made in the long-running zombie franchise. I certainly can't remember a time I've laughed this hard at the bad writing and terrible plot devices." In addition, it was ranked as the second worst episode of the seventh season by Comicbook.com's Brandon Davis, who wrote that "the dialogue was often hard to believe despite the episode featuring some of The Walking Dead's strongest actors". In contrast, Kelly Lawler of USA Today as having "a genuinely interesting action sequence" and pointing out that the plot moved forward.

=== Ratings ===
The episode received a 5.2 rating in the key 18-49 demographic with 11.00 million total viewers. It is at the time the lowest rating the show has had since "This Sorrowful Life" from season three.
