= The Walking Dead season 7 =

The Walking Dead
- Season 7
- Promotional poster and home media cover art featuring Negan
- Showrunner: Scott M. Gimple
- Starring: Andrew Lincoln; Norman Reedus; Steven Yeun; Lauren Cohan; Chandler Riggs; Danai Gurira; Melissa McBride; Michael Cudlitz; Lennie James; Sonequa Martin-Green; Jeffrey Dean Morgan; Alanna Masterson; Josh McDermitt; Christian Serratos; Seth Gilliam; Ross Marquand; Austin Nichols; Austin Amelio; Tom Payne; Xander Berkeley
- No. of episodes: 16

Release
- Original network: AMC
- Original release: October 23, 2016 – April 2, 2017

Season chronology
- ← Previous; Season 6 Next → Season 8

The seventh season of The Walking Dead, an American post-apocalyptic horror television series on AMC, premiered on October 23, 2016, and concluded on April 2, 2017, consisting of 16 episodes. Developed for television by Frank Darabont, the series is based on the eponymous series of comic books by Robert Kirkman, Tony Moore, and Charlie Adlard. The executive producers are Kirkman, David Alpert, Scott M. Gimple, Greg Nicotero, Tom Luse, and Gale Anne Hurd, with Gimple as showrunner for the fourth consecutive season. The seventh season received mixed reviews from critics. It was nominated for multiple awards and won three, including Best Horror Television Series for the second consecutive year, at the 43rd Saturn Awards.

This season adapts material from issues #100–114 of the comic book series and focuses on the oppressive group of survivors known as the Saviors, led by the vindictive Negan (Jeffrey Dean Morgan). He uses numbers, power and lethal brutality to coerce Rick Grimes (Andrew Lincoln), his group of survivors, and the Alexandria Safe-Zone to make regular offerings of supplies and weapons for the Saviors. Eventually, Rick and his group seek allies to help them confront Negan, including members of the survivor communities of the Hilltop, the Kingdom, Oceanside, and the Scavengers, who have had their own dealings with Negan and the Saviors.

== Cast ==
The primary characters of the seventh season, from "The Well" onwards, include (from left to right): Sasha, Daryl, Tara, Michonne, Gabriel, Carol, Rick, Carl, Maggie, Jesus, Rosita, Morgan, and Aaron; absent: Eugene, Negan, Spencer, Dwight, and Gregory

=== Main cast ===
The seventh season features twenty series regulars overall. For the season premiere, Jeffrey Dean Morgan and Austin Amelio were promoted to series regular status, with Morgan added to the opening credits and Amelio listed under "Also starring". After the first episode aired, the cast faced numerous changes: Steven Yeun and Michael Cudlitz were removed from the opening credits, while Alanna Masterson, Josh McDermitt and Christian Serratos were added to the opening credits, respectively, after previously being credited as "Also starring", in the second episode onwards. Tom Payne and Xander Berkeley were also promoted to series regulars in the second episode and beyond.

==== Starring ====
- Andrew Lincoln as Rick Grimes, the series' protagonist and leader of Alexandria, who is forced to adapt under the rule of Negan.
- Norman Reedus as Daryl Dixon, the group's primary hunter and a recruiter for Alexandria, who is taken prisoner by Negan.
- Steven Yeun as Glenn Rhee, Maggie's resourceful husband, who stands as the group's moral compass.^{1}
- Lauren Cohan as Maggie Greene, Glenn's strong-willed and pregnant wife.
- Chandler Riggs as Carl Grimes, Rick's teenage son, who struggles to maintain his renewed morality that he achieved from residing in Alexandria.
- Danai Gurira as Michonne, a katana-wielding warrior, who has opened up from her previous solitary life and has recently begun a relationship with Rick.
- Melissa McBride as Carol Peletier, an empowered member of the group, whose several tragedies force her to question her ruthless methods.
- Michael Cudlitz as Sgt. Abraham Ford, a former military sergeant, whose reevaluation of his life led him to break up with Rosita and pursue Sasha.^{1}
- Lennie James as Morgan Jones, the first survivor Rick had ever encountered, who is questioning the pacifist philosophy he had adopted.
- Sonequa Martin-Green as Sasha Williams, a former firefighter, Abraham's girlfriend and a guard of Alexandria, who has overcome various traumas.
- Jeffrey Dean Morgan as Negan, the manipulative and totalitarian leader of the Saviors, who serves as the primary antagonist of the season.
- Alanna Masterson as Tara Chambler, a caring member of the group, who discovers an all-female community called Oceanside and struggles to keep it a secret.
- Josh McDermitt as Eugene Porter, a survivor who struggles to prove his worth to the group after lying to them about knowing a possible cure to the walker virus.
- Christian Serratos as Rosita Espinosa, a pragmatic and protective member of the group, and ex-girlfriend of Abraham.

==== Also starring ====
- Seth Gilliam as Gabriel Stokes, a priest, who has managed to earn the group's trust after previously betraying them.
- Ross Marquand as Aaron, an Alexandrian recruiter, who brought Rick's group to Alexandria and serves as a bridge between the two factions.
- Austin Nichols as Spencer Monroe, a guard of Alexandria and the only surviving member of his family.
- Austin Amelio as Dwight, a ruthless but reluctant member of the Saviors and one of Negan's top lieutenants, who forms a violent, hostile rivalry with Daryl.
- Tom Payne as Paul "Jesus" Rovia, a scout for the Hilltop, who introduced Rick's group to his community.
- Xander Berkeley as Gregory, the selfish and arrogant leader of the Hilltop.

=== Supporting cast ===
==== Alexandria Safe-Zone ====
- Katelyn Nacon as Enid, an isolated teenager residing in Alexandria, who forms a special bond with Maggie and is starting to show feelings for Carl.
- Jason Douglas as Tobin, a resident of Alexandria and the foreman of the community's construction crew, who had a brief relationship with Carol.
- Corey Hawkins as Heath, a supply runner for Alexandria and Glenn's friend, who left the group to accompany Tara on a two-week supply run.
- Ann Mahoney as Olivia, an Alexandria resident, who is in charge of the community's food and armory.
- Kenric Green as Scott, a supply runner for Alexandria.
- Jordan Woods-Robinson as Eric Raleigh, Aaron's husband and former Alexandria recruiter.
- Dahlia Legault as Francine, a member of Alexandria's construction crew.
- Ted Huckabee as Bruce, a member of Alexandria's construction crew.
- Mandi Christine Kerr as Barbara, a resident of Alexandria.

==== The Hilltop ====
- R. Keith Harris as Dr. Harlan Carson, the Hilltop's doctor.
- James Chen as Kal, a Hilltop guard.
- Peter Zimmerman as Eduardo, a Hilltop guard.
- Karen Ceesay as Bertie, a resident of the Hilltop.
- Jeremy Palko as Andy, a resident of Hilltop.
- Brett Gentile as Freddie, a timid and nervous resident of the Hilltop.
- Ilan Srulovicz as Wesley, a supply runner for the Hilltop who pledges allegiance to Maggie.
- Anthony Lopez as Oscar, a supply runner for the Hilltop.

==== The Saviors ====
- Christine Evangelista as Sherry, Dwight's ex-wife and now one of Negan's "wives".
- Steven Ogg as Simon, Negan's right-hand man.
- Jayson Warner Smith as Gavin, a Savior lieutenant who deals directly with the Kingdom.
- Joshua Mikel as Jared, a volatile Savior who works with Gavin.
- Elizabeth Ludlow as Arat, a tough high-ranking Savior who is one of Negan's trusted lieutenants.
- Mike Seal as Gary, one of Negan's top lieutenants.
- Michael Scialabba as Gordon, a worker who flees the Sanctuary.
- Martinez as David, a sexually deviant Savior.
- Lindsley Register as Laura, one of Negan's top lieutenants.
- Joshua Hoover as Fat Joey, a Savior who guards Daryl's prison cell.
- Griffin Freeman as Mark, a member of the Saviors and Amber's ex-boyfriend.
- Ricky Russert as Chris, one of Negan's soldiers.
- Tim Parati as Dr. Emmett Carson, a Savior doctor and brother of Harlan Carson.
- Chloe Aktas as Tanya, one of Negan's wives.
- Elyse Dufour as Frankie, one of Negan's wives.
- Autumn Dial as Amber, Mark's ex-girlfriend and one of Negan's wives.
- Brian Stapf as Roy, a petty member of the Saviors.

==== The Kingdom ====
- Khary Payton as Ezekiel, a former zookeeper and the flamboyant leader of the Kingdom.
- Cooper Andrews as Jerry, Ezekiel's wise-cracking personal bodyguard.
- Karl Makinen as Richard, Ezekiel's right-hand-man.
- Logan Miller as Benjamin, a young member of the Kingdom who Morgan takes under his wing.
- Kerry Cahill as Dianne, a bow-wielding member of the Kingdom.
- Daniel Newman as Daniel, the first member of the Kingdom encountered.
- Carlos Navarro as Alvaro, one of Ezekiel's top soldiers.
- Macsen Lintz as Henry, a resident of the Kingdom and younger brother of Benjamin.
- Jason Burkey as Kevin, a resident of the Kingdom.
- Nadine Marissa as Nabila, a resident and gardener of the Kingdom.

==== Oceanside ====
- Deborah May as Natania, the leader of Oceanside.
- Sydney Park as Cyndie, Natania's granddaughter.
- Mimi Kirkland as Rachel, a young resident of Oceanside.
- Briana Venskus as Beatrice, one of Oceanside's top soldiers.
- Nicole Barré as Kathy, one of Oceanside's top soldiers.

==== The Scavengers ====
- Pollyanna McIntosh as Jadis, the unusual leader of the Scavengers.
- Thomas Francis Murphy as Brion, a high-ranking member of the Scavengers.
- Sabrina Gennarino as Tamiel, a high-ranking member of the Scavengers.
- Anja Akstin as Farron, a member of the Scavengers, who forms a brief rivalry with Michonne.

== Production ==
The promotional poster for the season at San Diego Comic-Con

The Walking Dead was renewed by AMC for a 16-episode seventh season on October 30, 2015. Filming for season 7 began in Georgia on May 2, 2016, and concluded on November 18, 2016. Actors Jeffrey Dean Morgan, Xander Berkeley, Tom Payne, and Austin Amelio were all promoted to series regulars for the seventh season, after having recurring roles in the sixth season. The seventh season has featured several extended episodes, running longer than its usual 43-minute running time (without commercials). Extended episodes have ranged from 46 to 62 minutes in length.

The finale was dedicated in memory of American comic artist Bernie Wrightson, who died on March 18, 2017.

== Episodes ==
No. overall	No. in season	Title	Directed by	Written by	Original release date	U.S. viewers (millions)
84	1	"The Day Will Come When You Won't Be"	Greg Nicotero	Scott M. Gimple	October 23, 2016	17.03
Negan's victim is revealed to be Abraham, who is beaten to death in front of Rick's group. Daryl punches Negan out of anger, prompting Negan to also murder Glenn. After several tests, Negan ultimately breaks Rick's resolve by nearly forcing him to hack off Carl's arm. Negan and his crew then leave with Daryl as hostage, while Sasha volunteers to take Maggie to Hilltop to recover, along with the bodies of Glenn and Abraham.
85	2	"The Well"	Greg Nicotero	Matthew Negrete	October 30, 2016	12.46
Carol and Morgan arrive at the Kingdom, a well-established community run by flamboyant former zookeeper "King" Ezekiel. The Kingdom, like Hilltop, has been producing for the Saviors under the threat of violence, although Ezekiel has kept this arrangement secret from most residents of the Kingdom. Carol recuperates and eagerly prepares to abandon the community, but opts to stay in an isolated house nearby after bonding with Ezekiel.
86	3	"The Cell"	Alrick Riley	Angela Kang	November 6, 2016	11.72
Daryl is locked in a cell at the Sanctuary, where Negan and Dwight constantly torture him in an effort to break him down to obedience. Negan sends Dwight on a mission to retrieve an escaped Savior, who says he would rather die than return to the Sanctuary. Dwight, therefore, ultimately mercy-kills the man. Daryl is given the opportunity to become a Savior but adamantly refuses.
87	4	"Service"	David Boyd	Corey Reed	November 13, 2016	11.40
As the grieving survivors struggle to come to terms with life under Negan's rule, Negan and the Saviors arrive at Alexandria days ahead of schedule for their first offering and take most of Alexandria's furniture and medicine, and all their firearms. Feeling powerless, Rick informs the survivors that he is no longer in charge and they must learn to live by Negan's terms. Rosita finds an empty cartridge case and brings it to Eugene, tasking him to craft a live, usable cartridge for a gun she found in the woods.
88	5	"Go Getters"	Darnell Martin	Channing Powell	November 20, 2016	11.00
Carl accompanies Enid to Hilltop to visit Maggie, who is recovering there with Sasha. Gregory is furious with Maggie and Sasha for not fulfilling their deal to kill the Saviors, and demands they leave. However, after they help defend Hilltop from a walker attack, Jesus tells Gregory he must let them stay. While the Saviors raid Hilltop's supplies, Sasha asks Jesus if he can find where Negan lives, which he agrees to do. Jesus then sneaks onto one of the Saviors' trucks, where he finds Carl hiding.
89	6	"Swear"	Michael E. Satrazemis	David Leslie Johnson	November 27, 2016	10.40
Two weeks after the attack at the Saviors' satellite station outpost, Tara is separated from Heath when she falls off a bridge during a walker attack. She washes up on a beach, where she is revived by a girl named Cyndie. Tara follows Cyndie to her community, Oceanside, a secluded group consisting of heavily-armed women and children; any men in the group had been slaughtered by the Saviors. Cyndie helps Tara find her way back to Alexandria and makes her swear to never mention Oceanside to anyone.
90	7	"Sing Me a Song"	Rosemary Rodriguez	Angela Kang & Corey Reed	December 4, 2016	10.48
Upon nearing the Sanctuary, Jesus jumps off the Saviors' truck to recon the area, but Carl stays behind to kill Negan on his own. Dwight subdues Carl, but Negan is impressed by Carl's bravery and tours him around Sanctuary. Rosita and Eugene manage to craft a live cartridge, while Spencer scavenges for supplies in the woods. Upon returning to Alexandria, the trio finds Negan and the Saviors are there.
91	8	"Hearts Still Beating"	Michael E. Satrazemis	Matthew Negrete & Channing Powell	December 11, 2016	10.58
With help from Jesus and an anonymous source, Daryl finally escapes from the Sanctuary. During a discussion about Rick's leadership, Negan guts and kills Spencer, enraging Rosita, who shoots at Negan but hits Lucille instead. As punishment, Arat kills Olivia. Negan and the Saviors then leave with Eugene as hostage. After a talk with Michonne, Rick is finally motivated to fight the Saviors. Rick's group travels to Hilltop to reunite with Maggie, Sasha, and Enid; Daryl and Jesus emerge, and the group embraces.
92	9	"Rock in the Road"	Greg Nicotero	Angela Kang	February 12, 2017	12.00
After Hilltop rallies behind Rick's group in the fight against the Saviors, Jesus introduces the group to the Kingdom, where they meet "King" Ezekiel and reunite with Morgan. Although Ezekiel hesitates to join the proposed alliance, he offers Daryl asylum at the Kingdom. In Alexandria, a group of Saviors raids the community in search of Daryl but leaves after they are unable to find him. Rick's group pursues Father Gabriel, who had taken the group's supplies and left clues leading to a dilapidated yard. Upon their arrival, the group is surrounded by the Scavengers.
93	10	"New Best Friends"	Jeffrey F. January	Channing Powell	February 19, 2017	11.08
Rick manages to convince the Scavengers to join Alexandria in the fight against the Saviors, but their leader, Jadis, demands Rick's group deliver them guns in exchange for their assistance. Richard plans to have Carol killed by the Saviors, believing that her death would motivate Ezekiel to fight. When Daryl learns of Richard's plans, he threatens to kill him should Carol be harmed in any way. After reuniting with Carol and lying to her about Glenn and Abraham's fates, Daryl travels to Hilltop to prepare for battle against the Saviors.
94	11	"Hostiles and Calamities"	Kari Skogland	David Leslie Johnson	February 26, 2017	10.42
Eugene settles in quickly at the Sanctuary, as he's rewarded for his intelligence and willingness to submit to Negan's demands. Eugene bonds with two of Negan's wives. At their request, he makes poison capsules; however, he refuses to give them the capsules after learning of their intentions to kill Negan. Dwight discovers a note from Sherry that reveals she helped Daryl escape from the Sanctuary and then fled to parts unknown. Dwight frames Dr. Emmett Carson for Daryl and Sherry's disappearances, leading Negan to murder Carson by hurling him into a furnace.
95	12	"Say Yes"	Greg Nicotero	Matthew Negrete	March 5, 2017	10.16
Rick and Michonne embark on a hunt for guns to bring to the Scavengers and find an abandoned school carnival, where they acquire dozens of guns. They bring the guns back to the Scavengers, but Jadis is unsatisfied and demands more. Tara contemplates whether or not to tell Rick about Oceanside, knowing Rick's group's need for weapons and reinforcements. Frustrated with the delay, Rosita travels to Hilltop and meets with Sasha; they make a pact to kill Negan together.
96	13	"Bury Me Here"	Alrick Riley	Scott M. Gimple	March 12, 2017	10.68
Ezekiel and his group meet the Saviors for the Kingdom's weekly tribute. After the Saviors notice a single cantaloupe is missing, Jared shoots Benjamin, who bleeds to death. Morgan finds the missing cantaloupe hidden in the street and learns that Richard sabotaged the drop-off in an effort to get himself killed and become a martyr for war. Morgan strangles Richard to death for causing Benjamin's murder. Morgan reveals the truth about Glenn, Abraham, Spencer, and Olivia to Carol, leading her to return to the Kingdom prepared to fight the Saviors alongside Ezekiel.
97	14	"The Other Side"	Michael E. Satrazemis	Angela Kang	March 19, 2017	10.32
The Saviors raid Hilltop unexpectedly, forcing Daryl and Maggie into hiding; the Saviors leave with Dr. Harlan Carson in tow to replace his now-deceased brother as their doctor. While sneaking into the Sanctuary on a secret mission, Sasha and Rosita encounter Eugene and urge him to escape, but he refuses. Sasha then locks Rosita out, telling her to go back to Alexandria because the group needs her. As Sasha breaks into the Sanctuary to kill Negan herself, Rosita flees and notices someone watching her.
98	15	"Something They Need"	Michael Slovis	Corey Reed	March 26, 2017	10.54
Tara leads the group to Oceanside in hopes of convincing that community to join the fight against the Saviors. Natania refuses to have her people fight but ultimately capitulates to Rick's group's demands to take their guns. After imprisoning Sasha, Negan reveals he is aware of Rick's plans to fight him and encourages Sasha to join him. She confides in Eugene and asks him for a weapon, then a way to kill herself; in response, he gives her one of the poison capsules he had made. Upon their return to Alexandria, Rick's group is greeted by Rosita, who after running into Dwight while fleeing the Sanctuary, reveals Dwight's intentions of helping take down Negan.
99	16	"The First Day of the Rest of Your Life"	Greg Nicotero	Scott M. Gimple & Angela Kang & Matthew Negrete	April 2, 2017	11.31
Negan and the Saviors travel to Alexandria with Sasha in a coffin as a gimmick to confront Rick. On the way, Sasha commits suicide with the poison capsule Eugene had given her. At Alexandria, the Scavengers double-cross Rick's group, revealing they've been dealing with Negan all along. After a standoff, a gun fight ensues, but with the unexpected arrival of Kingdom and Hilltop fighters Negan, the Saviors and the Scavengers are forced to retreat. Later the undead Sasha is put down by Maggie and Jesus.

== Reception ==
=== Critical response ===
The seventh season of The Walking Dead has received mixed reviews from critics. On Rotten Tomatoes, the season holds a score of 66% with an average rating of 6.85 out of 10 based on 620 reviews. The site's critical consensus reads: "Increased character depth and effective world-building helps The Walking Dead overcome a tiresome reliance on excessive, gratuitous violence."

The first episode of the season, "The Day Will Come When You Won't Be", received criticism for the amount of violence depicted in the episode, with one writer calling it the equivalent of "torture porn". Subsequently, the first half of the seventh season has seen some of the show's lowest critical ratings. The show's executive producer Gale Anne Hurd claimed that in light of the negative feedback, they tamed some of the more gruesome scenes that were in episodes being filmed for the second half of the season. Hurd said that "this is not a show that's torture porn... Let's make sure we don't cross that line". However, this claim was countered by executive producers Scott M. Gimple and Greg Nicotero. Gimple said that the violence used in the episode was "pronounced for a reason", specifically that "there was a purpose of traumatizing these characters to a point where maybe they would have been docile for the rest of their lives", but noted that he felt that this episode shouldn't represent "the base level of violence that necessarily should be on the show". On Rotten Tomatoes, it holds a 67% with an average rating of 7 out of 10, based on 54 reviews. The site's consensus reads: "The flashback-laden 'The Day Will Come When You Won't Be' is slow to deliver the payoff from last season's finale—but ultimately delivers with sadistic acts of gut-wrenching violence that will push Walking Dead fans to their limit."

The Walking Dead season 7: Critical reception by episode
Season 7 (2016–2017): Percentage of positive critics' reviews tracked by the website Rotten Tomatoes

=== Accolades ===
The series won two awards at the 43rd Saturn Awards: Best Actor on Television (Andrew Lincoln), and Best Guest Starring Role on Television (Jeffrey Dean Morgan). Additional nominations were for Best Supporting Actor on Television (Norman Reedus), Best Supporting Actress on Television (Danai Gurira and Melissa McBride), and Best Performance by a Younger Actor in a Television Series (Chandler Riggs).

The first half of the season was nominated for Outstanding Performance by a Stunt Ensemble in a Television Series at the 23rd Screen Actors Guild Awards. Additionally, for his portrayal of Negan, Jeffrey Dean Morgan earned himself a nomination and win for Best Guest Performer in a Drama Series at the 7th Critics' Choice Television Awards for the first half of the season, in addition to his guest appearance in the season six finale, "Last Day on Earth". Morgan was also nominated at the 26th MTV Movie & TV Awards for Best Actor in a TV Show and Best Villain, winning the latter.

=== Ratings ===
The Walking Dead's seventh-season premiere ("The Day Will Come When You Won't Be") received 17.03 million viewers in its initial broadcast on AMC in the United States. The viewership steadily declined every week after the premiere, until the seventh episode ("Sing Me a Song"), with the sixth episode ("Swear") of the season dropping to 10.40 million viewers, the lowest rating the show has had since season three. Viewing increased to 12 million viewers in the ninth episode ("Rock in the Road"), following this viewing decreased with the twelfth episode ("Say Yes") reaching a season low with 10.16 million viewers.

Viewership and ratings per episode of The Walking Dead season 7
No.	Title	Air date	Rating (18–49)	Viewers (millions)	DVR (18–49)	DVR viewers (millions)	Total (18–49)	Total viewers (millions)
1	"The Day Will Come When You Won't Be"	October 23, 2016	8.4	17.03	2.3	4.50	10.7	21.53
2	"The Well"	October 30, 2016	6.1	12.46	2.9	5.49	9.0	17.95
3	"The Cell"	November 6, 2016	5.7	11.72	2.9	5.49	8.6	17.21
4	"Service"	November 13, 2016	5.4	11.40	2.3	4.32	7.7	15.72^{1}
5	"Go Getters"	November 20, 2016	5.2	11.00	2.7	5.31	7.9	16.31
6	"Swear"	November 27, 2016	4.9	10.40	2.5	4.69	7.4	15.10
7	"Sing Me a Song"	December 4, 2016	5.0	10.48	2.7	5.29	7.7	15.78
8	"Hearts Still Beating"	December 11, 2016	5.1	10.58	2.8	5.42	7.9	16.02
9	"Rock in the Road"	February 12, 2017	5.7	12.00	2.5	4.82	8.2	16.84
10	"New Best Friends"	February 19, 2017	5.3	11.08	2.6	5.08	7.9	16.17
11	"Hostiles and Calamities"	February 26, 2017	5.0	10.43	2.7	5.32	7.7	15.76
12	"Say Yes"	March 5, 2017	4.7	10.16	1.9	3.50	6.6	13.67^{1}
13	"Bury Me Here"	March 12, 2017	4.9	10.68	2.0	3.74	6.9	14.43
14	"The Other Side"	March 19, 2017	4.7	10.32	2.3	4.45	7.0	14.78
15	"Something They Need"	March 26, 2017	4.9	10.54	2.1	4.22	7.0	14.77
16	"The First Day of the Rest of Your Life"	April 2, 2017	5.4	11.31	2.6	5.09	8.0	16.42

^1 Live +7 ratings were not available, so Live +3 ratings have been used instead.

== Home media ==
The season was released on Blu-ray and DVD in region 1 on August 22, 2017, in region 2 on September 25, 2017, and in region 4 on September 27, 2017. The "Limited Edition Spike Walker Statue" set, which is exclusive to Amazon.com was released on October 24, 2017, and was created by McFarlane Toys to pay homage to the zombie character featured in the "New Best Friends" episode in season 7.
