= Rock in the Road =

- The Walking Dead episode
- Enid tells the group that she needs to show them something: The people of Hilltop offer to join Alexandria in the fight against the Saviors.
- Episode no.: Season 7 Episode 9
- Directed by: Greg Nicotero
- Written by: Angela Kang
- Cinematography by: Michael E. Satrazemis
- Editing by: Rachel Goodlett Katz
- Original air date: February 12, 2017
- Running time: 50 minutes

Guest appearances
- Katelyn Nacon as Enid; Khary Payton as King Ezekiel; Steven Ogg as Simon; Karl Makinen as Richard; Jason Douglas as Tobin; Logan Miller as Benjamin; Jordan Woods-Robinson as Eric Raleigh; Cooper Andrews as Jerry; Carlos Navarro as Alvaro; Peter Zimmerman as Eduardo; Karen Ceesay as Bertie; Macsen Lintz as Henry; Ilan Srulovich as Wesley; Brett Gentile as Freddie; Jeremy Palko as Andy

Episode chronology
← Previous "Hearts Still Beating"	Next → "New Best Friends"
- The Walking Dead season 7

"Rock in the Road" is the ninth episode and mid-season premiere of the seventh season of the post-apocalyptic horror television series The Walking Dead, which aired on AMC on February 12, 2017. The episode was written by Angela Kang and directed by Greg Nicotero.

The episode focuses on Rick (Andrew Lincoln) and the group trying to recruit the Kingdom in joining Alexandria for the incoming fight against the Saviors.

== Plot ==
During the night shift at Alexandria, Gabriel sees something in the darkness. In a panic, he loads all of Alexandria's store of food and weapons into a car and drives away, as a dark figure appears in the passenger seat.

Meanwhile, at Hilltop, Rick and his group attempt to convince Gregory, Hilltop's leader, to assist in the struggle with the Saviors, but Gregory stubbornly refuses. Rick and his group, including Daryl, prepare to leave, but a group of Hilltop citizens pledge their support to Rick.

Before leaving Hilltop, Jesus proposes a visit to the Kingdom to introduce them to King Ezekiel. There, Rick's group reunites with Morgan, who, in keeping his word to Carol, asserts to them that he found her but she had subsequently left the Kingdom. Rick pleads his case to Ezekiel, who needs time to consider it but offers the group to stay overnight. However, the next day, Ezekiel states that he does not want to be involved, but will offer asylum to Daryl, who is currently a fugitive from the Saviors. Daryl does not want to stay, but Rick encourages him for his and Alexandria's safety, as well as to help convince Ezekiel to change his mind.

Rick's group drives back to Alexandria, but encounters a blockade of cars, set up by the Saviors to herd passing walkers, as well as a tripline rigged with dynamite. Rick and Michonne spend time to recover the dynamite, but a large group of walkers approaches. Rick and Michonne use the two cars to which the tripline was attached to run through and decimate hundreds of walkers, before switching vehicles and escaping. They arrive at Alexandria just as a group of Saviors led by Simon drive up; they are seeking Daryl. Rick lets them aggressively search the community, discovering that most of their food and other weapons are missing. As they leave, Simon warns that should Daryl turn up, there is "no statute of limitations."

Rick and the others try to figure out what happened to their stock of food, and discover Gabriel's absence. They find a note in his book with "boat," and Rick realizes this is the boat he and Aaron had previously scavenged for supplies. Rick, Michonne, Aaron, Tara, and Rosita go to the boat and follow footprints they recognize as Gabriel's, to a nearby urban parking lot. They are suddenly surrounded by a large group of people, weapons trained on them. Upon seeing this new group of survivors, Rick smiles.

== Reception ==
"Rock in the Road" received positive reviews from critics. On Rotten Tomatoes, it holds an 89% with an average rating of 7.44 out of 10, based on 36 reviews. The site's consensus reads: Incorporating a growing sense of optimism into the bleakness of its continuing arc, "Rock in the Road" is an energized and amusing setup for a climactic, imminent war. The episode received a 5.7 rating in the key 18-49 demographic with 12.00 million total viewers.
