= Sing Me a Song (The Walking Dead) =

- The Walking Dead episode
- Negan introduces Carl to his community.
- Episode no.: Season 7 Episode 7
- Directed by: Rosemary Rodriguez
- Written by: Angela Kang; Corey Reed
- Cinematography by: Stephen Campbell
- Editing by: Dan Liu
- Original air date: December 4, 2016
- Running time: 62 minutes

Guest appearances
- Christine Evangelista as Sherry; Ann Mahoney as Olivia; Joshua Hoover as Joseph; Tim Parati as Dr. Emmett Carson; Mike Seal as Gary; Brian F. Durkin as George; Ricky Russert as Chris; Aerli Austen as Isabelle; David Marshall Silverman as Kent; Autumn Dial as Amber; Elyse Nicole DuFour as Frankie; Chloe Aktas as Tanya; Griffin Freeman as Mark

Episode chronology
← Previous "Swear"	Next → "Hearts Still Beating"
- The Walking Dead season 7

"Sing Me a Song" is the seventh episode of the seventh season of the post-apocalyptic horror television series The Walking Dead, which aired on AMC on December 4, 2016. The episode was written by Angela Kang and Corey Reed, and directed by Rosemary Rodriguez.

The episode focuses on a much more detailed look into the world of the Saviors and their home, the Sanctuary. Meanwhile, members of Alexandria look for supplies.

== Plot ==
Michonne walks down a single-lane road, whistling to attract walkers. She kills two walkers she's lured and drags their bodies away. Separately, Carl and Jesus have stowed away on the same Saviors' truck as it is driven back to their base, Sanctuary. Carl tricks Jesus into getting out of the truck, and he stays with it as it pulls into the Sanctuary's yard, where he sees the Saviors' leader Negan, several Saviors, and his friend Daryl. Carl attempts to shoot Negan, killing two of his Saviors before he is pinned down by Dwight and disarmed afterwards. Negan is impressed by Carl's bravery, and escorts him around the factory floor and then introduces him to his "harem" of wives. There, Sherry (Christine Evangelista) reluctantly concedes to Negan that one of his other wives, Amber (Autumn Dial), has been cheating on him with her ex-boyfriend, Mark (Griffin Freeman). In response, Negan admonishes Amber and tells Dwight, with Daryl in tow, to "fire up that furnace."

Alone with Carl, Negan tells the boy he is trying to bond with him, and asks him to remove his bandages so he can look at Carl's missing eye, coercing Carl by reminding him he killed two of his men. After Carl takes off the bandage, Negan humiliates him by asking if he can touch it, and Carl starts crying, and Negan backs off. As part of paying off his "debt" to him, Negan asks Carl to sing to him, and Carl weakly sings "You Are My Sunshine". This leads to Carl explaining how he had to shoot his mother to prevent her from turning. Later, Negan takes Carl with him to see Mark's punishment, having half his face branded with a hot iron.

Elsewhere, the survivors of Alexandria are preparing for the Saviors' next tribute. Rick and Aaron are part of one team searching for supplies, and they discover a houseboat adrift on a lake nearby, seemingly loaded with supplies but the lake is filled with numerous walkers. They plot how they will get to the boat. Nearby, Father Gabriel and Spencer are driving along to seek supplies. Spencer bitterly complains about Rick's leadership in the face of the Saviors and thinks he could be a better leader. Gabriel is fed up with Spencer and leaves the car to go on his own. Eugene and Rosita secretly meet in the nearby industrial machine shop Eugene had found, where Rosita demands Eugene make a bullet for her to kill Negan. Eugene initially refuses, believing Rosita's plan will not work, but she plays on how others have saved him several times because they feel sorry for him, and this would be the first useful thing that he has done. Eugene is hurt by the comments but proceeds to make the bullet, though he refuses to listen to Rosita's apology. They are later picked up by Spencer and taken back to Alexandria.

While these groups are out, Negan decides to take Carl back to Alexandria, and sets off with a small group of men. Once Negan departs, Daryl finds a note slipped under his cell door that says "go now" and the key to a motorcycle. As a lone Savior drives down a road, she's forced to stop when she reaches a barricade of walker corpses. As the Savior investigates, Michonne sneaks up on her, katana drawn, and orders the woman to take them to Negan. The Savior submits, having fallen into Michonne's trap. At Alexandria, with Rick absent, Negan decides to wait for Rick and has Carl show him around the home they occupy. Carl tries to keep him from Judith's bedroom, but is unable to stop Negan from entering. Negan takes an immediate liking to Judith, and later sits on the front porch, rocking her in his lap while he contemplates killing Rick and Carl and moving into Alexandria.

== Reception ==
=== Critical reception ===
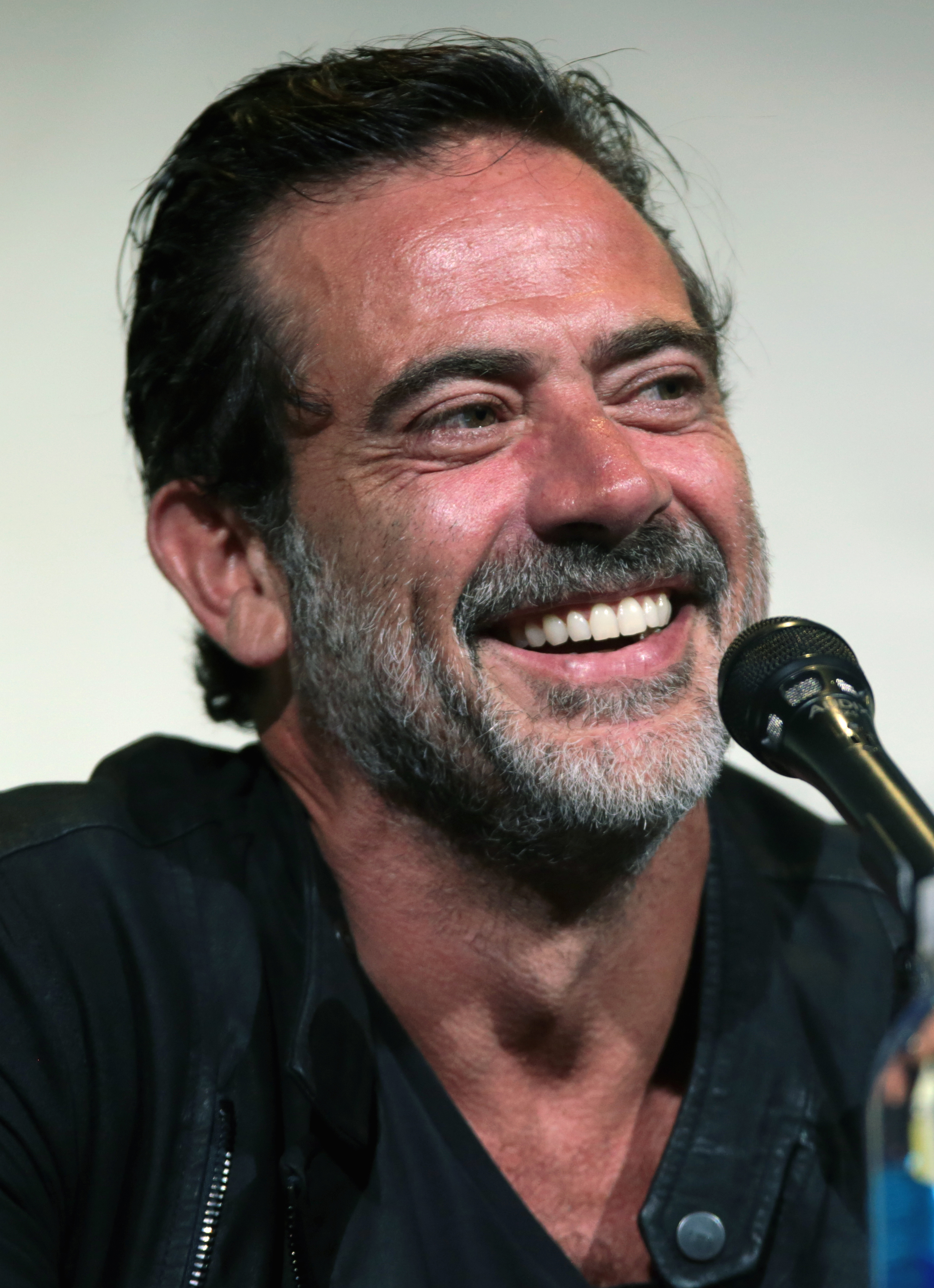
Jeffrey Dean Morgan received praise for his performance as Negan in this episode.

"Sing Me a Song" received generally positive reviews from critics. On Rotten Tomatoes, it holds a 72% with an average rating of 6.25 out of 10, based on 32 reviews. The site's consensus reads: "Sing Me a Song" propels TWD forward by returning to multiple storylines and revealing substantial layers of Negan's character and influence.

Jeremy Egner of The New York Times gave the episode and Jeffrey Dean Morgan's performance a positive review, saying "Negan and Carl ending up at Alexandria was a nice zag that I didn't see coming, and I'm intrigued by where their relationship could go... That and Mr. Morgan's more nuanced performance gives me hope that the midseason finale could be a good one." Paul Vigna of The Wall Street Journal complimented the story's pacing, saying "After spending a long time laying out all the pieces on the new chessboard, The Walking Dead finally got to moving some of them around." Noel Murray of Rolling Stone criticized the episode's extended running time, but praised Morgan's performance, saying "This episode doesn't really justify its extended running time. But this chapter was the best showcase yet for Jeffrey Dean Morgan, who finally got the chance to do more than just grin, whistle, swear, and slaughter."

=== Ratings ===
The episode received a 6.9 rating in the key 18-49 demographic with 10.48 million total viewers.
