= Say Yes (The Walking Dead) =

- The Walking Dead episode
- Rosita asks for Sasha's help.
- Episode no.: Season 7 Episode 12
- Directed by: Greg Nicotero
- Written by: Matthew Negrete
- Cinematography by: Stephen Campbell
- Editing by: Rachel Goodlett Katz
- Original air date: March 5, 2017
- Running time: 42 minutes

Guest appearances
- Pollyanna McIntosh as Jadis; Thomas Francis Murphy as Brion; Sabrina Gennarino as Tamiel

Episode chronology
← Previous "Hostiles and Calamities"	Next → "Bury Me Here"
- The Walking Dead season 7

"Say Yes" is the twelfth episode of the seventh season of the post-apocalyptic horror television series The Walking Dead, which aired on AMC on March 5, 2017. The episode was written by Matthew Negrete and directed by Greg Nicotero.

The episode focuses on Rick (Andrew Lincoln) and Michonne (Danai Gurira) scavenging for supplies. Back in Alexandria, Tara (Alanna Masterson) must make a morally challenging decision. Rosita (Christian Serratos) plans to assassinate Negan (Jeffrey Dean Morgan), with the help of a former friend, Sasha (Sonequa Martin-Green).

== Plot ==
Rick and Michonne leave Alexandria to search for guns to give to the Scavengers to get their help in fighting the Saviors. After one fruitless day, they find an abandoned traveling carnival behind a school; the grounds are filled with walkers of many military soldiers still equipped with their guns. They scout the crowd from the school's roof, but it collapses on them. They land on mattresses inside the empty school, and discover a supply of rations. As they feast and prepare to deal with the walkers the next day, Michonne encourages Rick to take charge of the new world order once they have defeated the Saviors. Rick is unsure of this.

Meanwhile, Rosita ventures out on her own, trying to find more guns, but is unsuccessful. She meets with Gabriel and expresses her desire to kill Negan even if she dies in the attempt, expressing contempt for Gabriel's approach to handling the Saviors. Gabriel cautions her that dying is the easy way out.

In the morning, Rick and Michonne methodically deal with the walker horde. As they split up to finish off the stragglers, Rick spots a deer. As he owes a deer to Michonne for the one she had to give to the Saviors earlier, he climbs the ferris wheel to snipe it, but his footing breaks under him and he falls near a crowd of walkers. Michonne runs over and, horrified at seeing what she thinks are the walkers eating him, drops her katana. Rick reveals himself, having hidden under a crate, and together they clear the remaining walkers eating the deer he had spotted. They collect the guns and return to Alexandria before heading off to meet Jadis, the leader of the Scavengers. She says that Rick has not brought enough guns to fulfill their deal and he needs to return the cat statue he took. He agrees to acquire more guns.

Frustrated, the group returns to Alexandria. Tara, who has contemplated telling the others about the well-armed Oceanside community, asks Rick if they can talk. Knowing they still need to keep looking for weapons, Rosita travels alone to the Hilltop community to meet with Sasha, convincing her to join in her attempt to assassinate Negan with a sniper rifle. Sasha demands to be able to take the kill-shot. They both acknowledge they will likely not survive the attempt.

== Reception ==
=== Critical reception ===
"Say Yes" received generally positive reviews from critics. On Rotten Tomatoes, it holds a 79% with an average rating of 6.65 out of 10, based on 34 reviews. The site's consensus reads: "Say Yes" features an enjoyable side trip with Rick and Michonne, as well as surprises, a few laughs, and some good zombie action."

Erik Kain of Forbes reviewed the episode, saying, "Truly a bizarre episode. Probably the most disappointing one this season since I was genuinely enjoying it for a while before it took a nose dive. That deer. My god, that deer."

=== Ratings ===
The episode received a 4.7 rating in the key 18-49 demographic, the lowest since the sixth episode of season three, "Hounded", and the entire season with 10.16 million total viewers.
