= Bury Me Here =

- The Walking Dead episode
- Benjamin is shot as members of The Kingdom, including King Ezekiel, Carol and Morgan, rush to his aid
- Episode no.: Season 7 Episode 13
- Directed by: Alrick Riley
- Written by: Scott M. Gimple
- Cinematography by: Stephen Campbell
- Editing by: Orlando Machado Jr.
- Original air date: March 12, 2017
- Running time: 46 minutes

Guest appearances
- Khary Payton as King Ezekiel; Logan Miller as Benjamin; Karl Makinen as Richard; Cooper Andrews as Jerry; Carlos Navarro as Alvaro; Kerry Cahill as Dianne; Daniel Newman as Daniel; Jayson Warner Smith as Gavin; Joshua Mikel as Jared; Macsen Lintz as Henry; Nadine Marissa as Nabila; Jason Burkey as Kevin

Episode chronology
← Previous "Say Yes"	Next → "The Other Side"
- The Walking Dead season 7

"Bury Me Here" is the thirteenth episode of the seventh season of the post-apocalyptic horror television series The Walking Dead, which aired on AMC on March 12, 2017. The episode was written by Scott M. Gimple and directed by Alrick Riley. The episode focuses on The Kingdom delivering goods to the Saviors during a routine supply drop-off, but things don't go as planned. It also marks the final appearances of Benjamin (Logan Miller) and Richard (Karl Makinen).

== Plot ==
King Ezekiel, Morgan, Richard, and a group of Kingdom officers meet the Saviors for their routine supply drop-off, after making their way past a blocked road with an open grave nearby. Since they were tardy and only delivered eleven cantaloupes instead of twelve, the group leader, Gavin, explains he's going to teach them a lesson so they understand the stakes and orders Jared to shoot someone. Jared raises his gun and points it at Richard, who says "Just do it", but Jared shifts his hand at the last second before pulling the trigger and shoots Benjamin in the leg. After being rushed to Carol's cottage, Benjamin bleeds out and eventually dies. Back at the urban lot, where they encountered the roadblock, Morgan walks alone and begins to become unhinged, similar to his life before learning aikido, experiencing flashbacks of his son and wife. He contemplates suicide, but backs out. However, he finds the missing cantaloupe hidden in a crate on the street and realizes that Richard intentionally hid the cantaloupe. Morgan returns to the Kingdom and confronts Richard, who explains that he planned to provoke the Saviors into killing him, as Gavin had promised he'd be the first to die if anything went wrong. He'd hoped his death over something so petty would motivate Ezekiel to fight the Saviors.

The next day, Ezekiel and the others return to meet the Saviors for a drop to make up for the missing cantaloupe and upon learning about Benjamin's death, Gavin banishes Jared to the outpost, with the threat of death if he tries to say something against it. Because Richard has not told Ezekiel the truth yet, Morgan strangles Richard to death and tells everyone that Richard staged the missing cantaloupe in order to incite a war. After exposing Richard's plan, Morgan assures Gavin that he knows what's at stake if things went wrong, to which Gavin assents. Morgan drags Richard's corpse to the open grave and buries him there. He then returns to Carol and confesses that Negan and the Saviors killed Abraham, Glenn, Spencer, and Olivia. He explains that Rick wants to fight the Saviors and that's why he was at the Kingdom. Morgan prepares to go after the Saviors and promises to kill "every last one", but Carol convinces him to stay. Carol returns to the Kingdom and finds Ezekiel, telling him she's moving to the Kingdom. She tells him that they need to fight and prepare for the imminent war, to which Ezekiel agrees. Back at the cottage, Morgan sits alone on the porch, seemingly whittling the end of his fighting stick into a sharp point.

== Reception ==
=== Critical reception ===
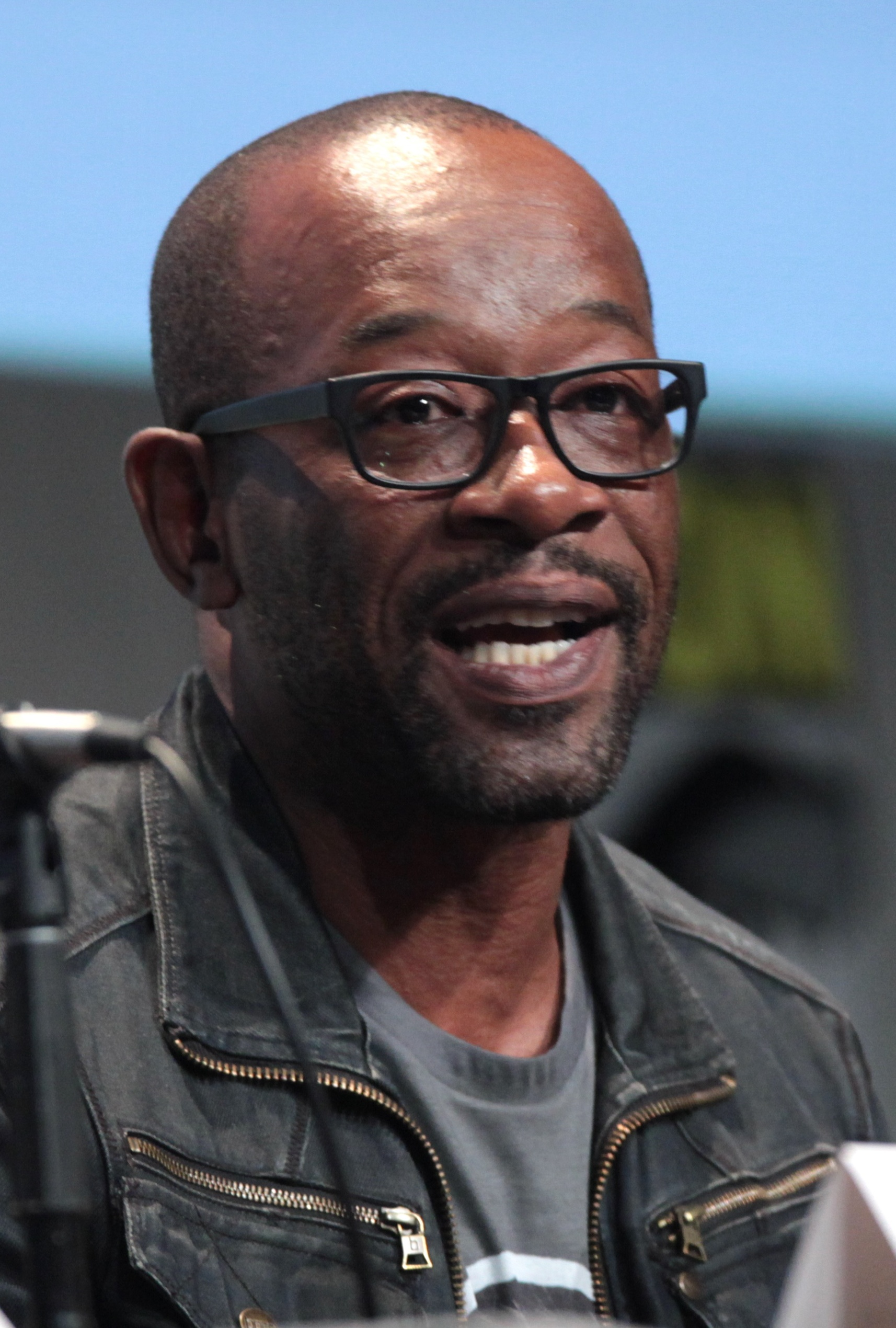
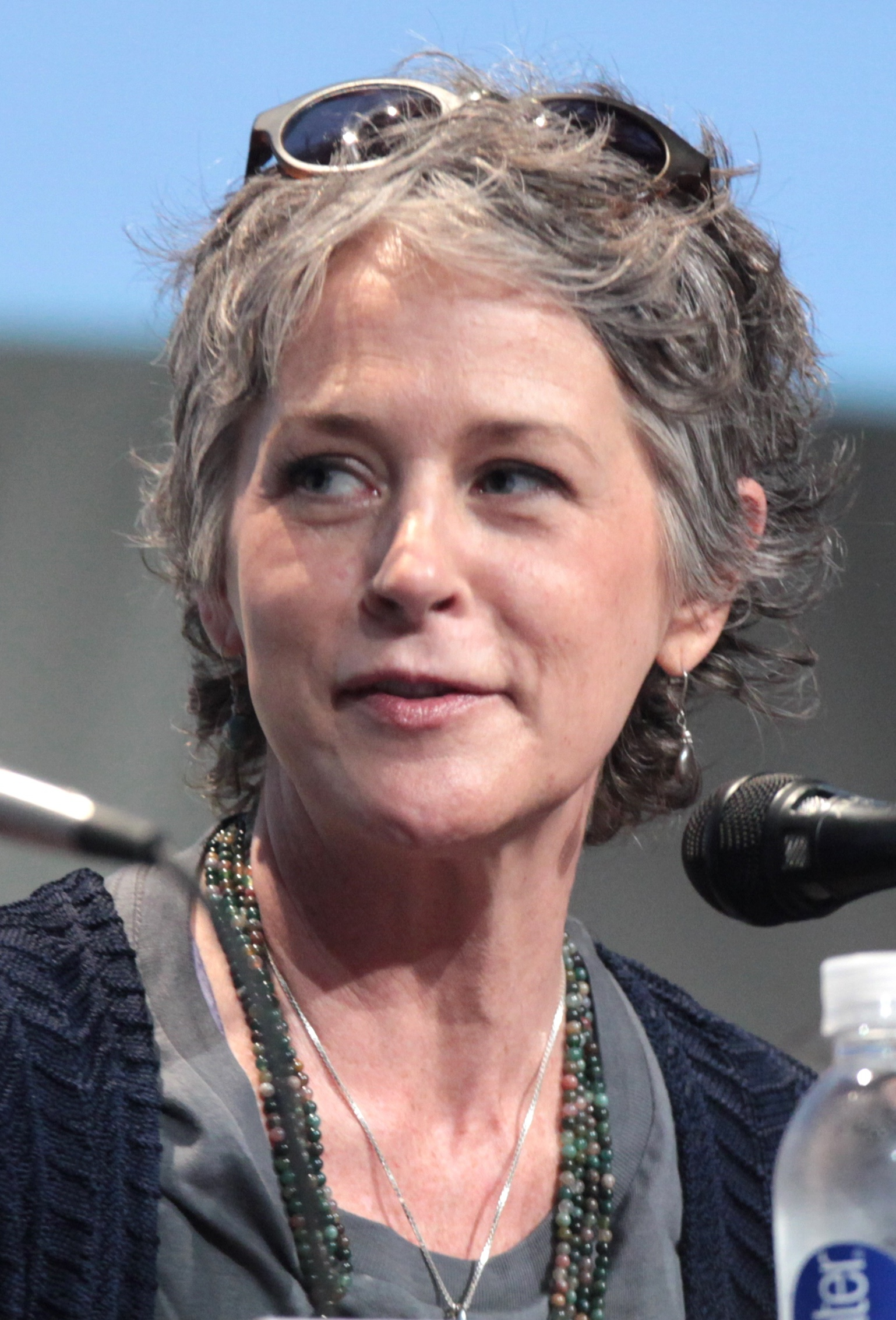
Lennie James (left) and Melissa McBride's (right) performances received praise by critics

"Bury Me Here" received positive reviews from critics. On Rotten Tomatoes, it holds an 81% with an average rating of 7.19 out of 10, based on 31 reviews. The site's consensus reads: "Moving performances by Lennie James and Melissa McBride as their characters get their mojo back move the season's arc forward in "Bury Me Here," though the pacing is slow and their journeys seem relatively implausible." Many critics noted James' emotional performance, as well as McBride's as the episode's highlights.

Zack Handlen of The A.V. Club graded the episode a B+ and said: "The show has made an effort to delineate the tensions between the Kingdom and Saviors in small but believable ways, and when violence does happen, it happens in a way neither side entirely expects, but seems entirely inevitable in retrospect".

Liam Mathews of TV.com also reviewed the episode, saying, "'Bury Me Here' was a frustrating episode of The Walking Dead. Everything you could have expected to happen happened pretty much exactly as you would have expected."

=== Ratings ===
The episode received a 4.9 rating in the key 18-49 demographic, with 10.68 million total viewers.
