= Gregory (The Walking Dead) =

- The Walking Dead character
- Gregory, as he appears in the comic book series (left) and as portrayed by Xander Berkeley in the television series (right).
- First appearance: Comic: "Issue #95" (2012); Television: "Knots Untie" (2016)
- Last appearance: Comic: "Issue #142" (2015); Television: "A New Beginning" (2018)
- Created by: Robert Kirkman; Charlie Adlard
- Adapted by: Scott M. Gimple (The Walking Dead)
- Portrayed by: Xander Berkeley

In-universe information
- Occupation: Leader of the Hilltop Colony; Television: Business Owner

Gregory is a fictional character from the comic book series The Walking Dead and the television series of the same name, in which he was portrayed by Xander Berkeley.

In both media, Gregory is introduced as the cowardly leader of The Hilltop who submits to Negan and the tyranny of the Saviors. Fed up with their forced subjugation, the people of The Hilltop rally behind Rick Grimes and his declaration of war against the Saviors with Maggie Greene succeeding Gregory as their leader.

== Appearances ==
=== Comic book series ===
Gregory is a somewhat self-important member of the Hilltop described as "keeping the trains running on time", though he hosts a number of flaws (including hitting on female newcomers of the Hilltop, forgetting names, and putting himself before others). He is stabbed by Ethan in exchange for Craig's life, who had been taken hostage by Negan, but recovers. Like his fellow survivors, he is helpless against the Saviors and relies on Rick to help rid them of the gang. His inability to rule becomes increasingly apparent throughout his time in the comics. He is apparently overthrown by Maggie Greene as the Hilltop's leader. When Carl starts to live in the Hilltop and beats two boys almost to death he plans to kill Maggie by poisoning her. However, his plan is foiled by Jesus who arrives in time to save Maggie, who requests that Gregory be jailed. After much deliberation, Maggie decides that Gregory must be killed. He is later hanged for his attempt on Maggie's life as the rest of the Hilltop watch.

=== Television series ===
==== Season 6 ====
In the episode "Knots Untie", Rick's group are introduced to Gregory, who leads the Hilltop Colony and is a former businessman on the Chamber of Commerce. Rick ominously says he should not be the one to talk to Gregory and tells Maggie to conduct trade talks. Gregory immediately belittles Maggie and asserts that the Alexandrians are in great need and attempts to use their food shortage as leverage. Later, Rick says that they came all this way for food and they're going to get it, but Jesus calls for patience as he works to convince Gregory to instead show some goodwill to Alexandria and build a relationship that could pay back in the future. Three Hilltop residents, Ethan, Andy and Crystal, return and angrily confront Gregory. They had been sent to deliver tribute to Negan, who said that it was "light" and killed Tim and Marsha while keeping Ethan's brother Craig hostage. For Craig's release, Ethan delivers a message from Negan by stabbing Gregory in the gut. After Gregory is stabilized, Jesus explains that Negan is the head of a group called the Saviors. The Saviors came to the Hilltop, issuing a lot of demands and even more threats, resulting in a deal: half of the Hilltop's supplies, crops and livestock goes to the Saviors in exchange for peace. Daryl offers to kill Negan, take out his boys and rescue Craig if the Hilltop provides food and medicine along with "one of them cows." Maggie closes the deal with Gregory, demanding Hilltop provide half of everything in advance.

==== Season 7 ====
In the episode "Go Getters", Gregory approaches Maggie and Sasha and insists they need to leave and go back to Alexandria. Jesus tries to reason with him, but Gregory says they must leave by morning. At night, Maggie and Sasha wake up to loud music coming from a car parked on the Hilltop's interior, with the Hilltop gates open. Walkers are being attracted by the music and multiple fires that have been set inside the Hilltop. Gregory stares out the window of the house, but does not take action, while Maggie, Sasha, and Jesus intervene. The next day, Gregory and Jesus discuss what to do about Maggie and Sasha when some Saviors show up. Gregory tells Jesus to hide Maggie and Sasha in the closet. Gregory opens the door for Simon and the other Saviors at the Hilltop. Simon tells Gregory they should talk in private in the study. Gregory said the message last night was received loud and clear: He is the Hilltop's "Negan" now. Simon asks if there is anything else he should be made aware of and Gregory stays silent. He says that there actually is something and Gregory leads Simon to the corridor closet, opening the door to reveal bottles of classic scotch. Simon asks Gregory to kneel before they continue and Gregory instantly obliges. Simon tells him it's a solid kneel, and pats his head like a child. After the Saviors leave, Gregory finds Sasha and Maggie in his room, where they were hiding in a closet. Jesus puts his foot down and says the women are staying, and he will knock Gregory out of power if he disagrees. Gregory says the Saviors can be quite reasonable and Maggie punches him in the face. In the mid-season finale "Hearts Still Beating", Gregory warns Maggie not to let her popularity with the Hilltop residents get to her head.

In the mid-season premiere "Rock in the Road", when Rick's group arrives in the neighborhood Hilltop Rick tries to convince Gregory to fight Negan and the Saviors but he refuses to let his community fight, he tells them that his previous agreement is null and void. "We are not business partners," he says, in addition to ruling out any other connection. Jesus calls him out for his cowardly behavior and for not helping to save the community when Maggie and Sasha did. Rick insists that the group can win and questions how Gregory wants to live. Maggie intervenes. Gregory calls them by the wrong name and insists that the Hilltop people do not want to help and will only serve crops, but not fight. Tara insists that people will take a step forward, given an option. Gregory prevents her from finishing her sentence, although he admits that they would be better off without the Saviors. Daryl calls him by his big mouth, and asks "are you with us or are you not", and Gregory makes it clear that he does not want anything to do with the fight and makes everyone leave Hilltop, pretending they were never there nor had their meeting. In the episode "The Other Side", after Simon and an escort of Saviors appear again in Hilltop, Gregory welcomes them with open arms and tries to find out the reason for his previous arrival. Simon's real reason for his visit is to acquire a new doctor for the Sanctuary. Gregory tries to avoid being taken to the only doctor in the community but is once again subjected to the actions of the Saviors. Seeing that the loyalty of his followers is now doubtful with the arrival of Maggie and Sasha, Gregory expresses to Simon his doubts about an internal problem in the community although Simon calms him down and makes it clear that he will solve any problem of Gregory's. In the episode "Something They Need", when Maggie leaves the community to dig out a blueberry bush, Gregory follows her and apologizes for his behavior towards her. Maggie gives him a knife to protect her while digging the bush, and he contemplates using it against her due to her leadership overshadowing his. However, when the walkers appear, he can not bring down the walker who attacks him and Maggie saves his life in time.

==== Season 8 ====
As seen in the season premiere "Mercy" and the episode "The Big Scary U," Gregory makes his way to the Satellite Outpost and from there to the Sanctuary after abandoning the Hilltop. Gregory meets with Negan and his lieutenants and promises that he can help to bring the Hilltop back into line before the Militia arrives to attack. Simon calls Gregory out to order the Hilltop to stand down, but the Hilltop members ignore Gregory's order, instead choosing to stand with Maggie as their leader over Gregory. An enraged Simon pushes Gregory down a flight of stairs, injuring him. As the attack begins, Gabriel Stokes spots Gregory in danger and rescues him from the herd of walkers. In return, Gregory steals Gabriel's car and abandons him to die. In the episode "Monsters," Gregory returns to the Hilltop in Gabriel's car where he attempts to gain entrance. Kal is revealed to have abandoned Gregory after learning of his true plans and Maggie deduces Gregory's cowardice after they recognize Gabriel's car. Despite this, Maggie decides to allow Gregory to reenter the Hilltop, telling Enid that Gregory isn't worth killing. In the episode "The King, the Widow, and Rick," Gregory attempts to act as an advisor to Maggie, but she distrusts him. As a result, Maggie locks Gregory away in the new pen built for their Savior prisoners. Gregory spends several episodes as a captive in the pen, attempting to negotiate his way out but being largely ignored. In the final mid-season "How It's Gotta Be" Gregory is still in the cage he is locked in with the captured Saviors. When Maggie gets back, Gregory tries to talk to her about getting why she locked him in, but Maggie shuts him up. Maggie storms up to the fence and requests that Dean be fetched from the prison. Gregory is angered that he gets to come out, but is shocked that Maggie brought him out to execute him.

In the episode "Dead or Alive Or" Gregory speaks to Maggie through the barb-wire fence, reasoning that he should be released for good behavior, but Maggie refuses to set him free. Alden then approaches the two, speaking up for the rest of the Saviors and attempting to come to an agreement, suggesting that the prisoners be allowed supervised freedom every once in a while for a few minutes each. Again, Maggie refuses, and reveals that they are removing their rations for a few days, much to the shock of the Saviors and Gregory. Later, Maggie returns to the holding pen and agrees to Alden's deal, allowing a maximum of two Saviors at any given time out of the pen for work, exercise and, if the need arises, medical attention. Gregory, while grateful for her decision, is worried about an impending attack by the Saviors and implores that Maggie consider an evacuation, fearing losing the war. She remains strong, telling Gregory that with all they have now, there is little possibility for loss. In the episode "Do Not Send Us Astray," after the Savior attack, Henry visits the pen in hopes of finding out who killed his brother Benjamin and exacting revenge upon them. Gregory introduces himself and alongside Alden attempts to talk Henry down without success. After a Savior prisoner suddenly turns and begins attacking, Jared overpowers Henry and most of the prisoners make a run for it. After appearing to briefly hesitate over whether or not to help out Henry, Gregory chooses to join the Savior prisoners in running rather than staying to help with the situation at the Hilltop. In the episode "Worth," Gregory is revealed to have returned to the Sanctuary and the Saviors. Gregory tries to suck up to Simon again and actually stands up to him, causing Simon to change his mind about killing Gregory. Gregory participates in Simon's attempted coup and is spared when Negan and his loyalists kill Simon's soldiers. During the brutal fight between Simon and Negan, Gregory escapes the Sanctuary with the help of Dwight who gives Gregory a map detailing Negan's plans to give to Rick. Gregory returns to the Hilltop and hands over the plans before being locked up again. During the season finale "Wrath," Gregory is mentioned to have been left behind at the Hilltop when the residents evacuate rather than being taken with them.

==== Season 9 ====
In the season premiere "A New Beginning," Gregory is revealed to have called for a vote to determine who the leader of the Hilltop will be in the eighteen months since the war with the Saviors and has lost in favor of Maggie. Now even more angry and bitter, Gregory takes advantage of a grieving father, persuading him make an unsuccessful attempt on Maggie's life and then luring Maggie into a trap by claiming that someone is vandalizing Glenn's grave. Maggie confronts Gregory, who tries to kill Maggie himself, but she overpowers him. Tired of Gregory's constant treachery, Maggie decides to execute him to prevent such a thing from happening again. That night, Gregory is strung up to a newly-built gallows and sat on a horse in front of the entire Hilltop Colony as well as Rick and Michonne. As he pleads for his life, Maggie has Daryl send the horse away, hanging Gregory. Daryl then cuts him down on Maggie's orders.

== Development and reception ==
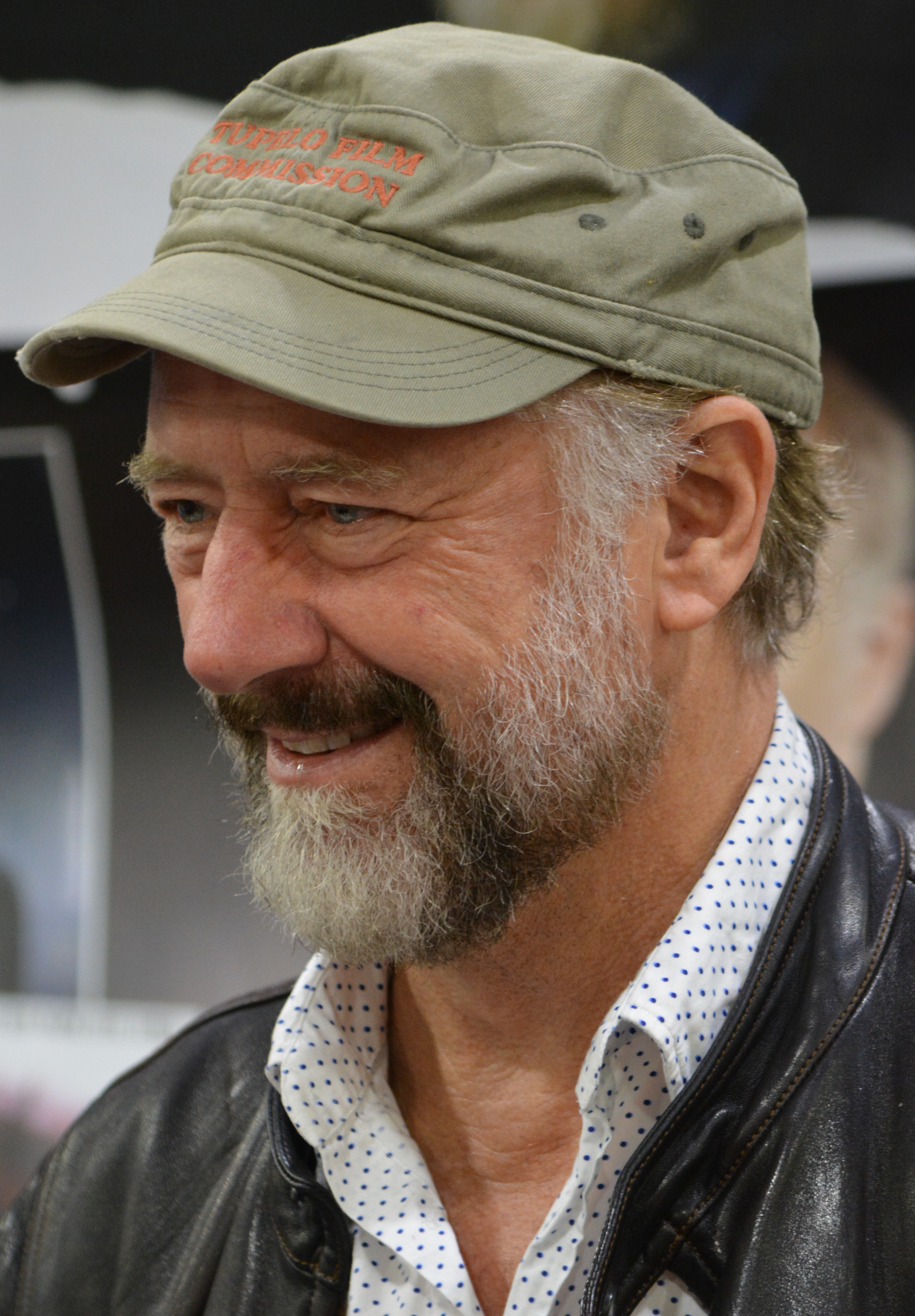
Xander Berkeley portrays Gregory

Gregory is portrayed by Xander Berkeley on The Walking Dead television series, beginning with the sixth season. In his debut appearance in the season six episode "Knots Untie", Ed Powers of Telegraph.co.uk called Gregory "a cowardly creep" and "slithery", commenting: "Gregory was painted in broad strokes by veteran television actor Berkeley (24), a further example of The Walking Dead telegraphing to the audience how it should feel about a character." Josh Jackson of Paste commented: "Gregory is indeed a strange one, and no matter how idyllic the Hilltop seems, I don't think he's the leader I'd want for the zombie apocalypse. Anybody who introduces himself as 'the boss' and asks his guests to go wash up is someone who I might hesitate to save from his own people." Tim Surette of TV.com commented that Gregory "wasted no time being one of the most despicable characters the series has ever introduced by drooling all over Maggie and requesting some of her "services" in exchange for some carrots." Ed Gonzalez of Slant Magazine called Gregory "some kind of perverse caricature of the Southern gentlemen. By which I mean he scarcely qualifies as one."

For the seventh season, Berkeley was promoted to a series regular.

Noel Murray of Rolling Stone ranked Gregory 24th in a list of 30 best Walking Dead characters, saying, "he's made quite an impression, thanks to Xander Berkeley's gruff performance. More inclined to defer to the strong than to take action himself, Gregory has become the show's version of a weaselly politician: pretending to be in charge but always waiting to see which way the wind is blowing before making any decisions."
