= Swear (The Walking Dead) =

- The Walking Dead episode
- The Oceanside community is introduced.
- Episode no.: Season 7 Episode 6
- Directed by: Michael E. Satrazemis
- Written by: David Leslie Johnson
- Cinematography by: Stephen Campbell
- Editing by: Rachel Goodlett Katz
- Original air date: November 27, 2016
- Running time: 49 minutes

Guest appearances
- Corey Hawkins as Heath; Deborah May as Natania; Sydney Park as Cyndie; Briana Venskus as Beatrice; Nicole Barré as Kathy; Mimi Kirkland as Rachel; Jaqueline Fleming as Laundry Woman #1; Lane Carlock as Laundry Woman #2

Episode chronology
← Previous "Go Getters"	Next → "Sing Me a Song"
- The Walking Dead season 7

"Swear" is the sixth episode of the seventh season of the post-apocalyptic horror television series The Walking Dead, which aired on AMC on November 27, 2016. The episode was written by David Leslie Johnson and directed by Michael E. Satrazemis.

The episode focuses on Tara (Alanna Masterson), after being separated from Heath (Corey Hawkins) during their two-week supply run, running into trouble after she encounters a group living near the ocean.

== Plot ==
Two weeks after the attack at the Saviors' satellite station outpost, Tara is separated from Heath after falling off a bridge during a walker attack. She washes up on a beach, where she is found by a young woman named Cyndie (Sydney Park) who leaves behind bottles of water, a fish and a spear. Upon regaining consciousness she spots Cyndie and follows her to her community, Oceanside: a group consisting of only female survivors grounded in Virginia that has situated in a pre-apocalypse campground. She is discovered, shot at, and taken captive. Their leader, Natania (Deborah May), questions Tara, who lies and says that she and her friend had been traveling alone. Eventually, caught in a lie, she admits to being part of a community and tries to convince the members of Oceanside that they should make contact with Alexandria. Natania appears to agree and assigns two women to escort Tara home.

Just outside of Oceanside, Tara, realizing that her escorts are going to kill her, says she will take care of a walker ahead of them, separating from her escorts. Once she is near the walker, she makes a run in an attempt to escape from her escorts while being shot at. She then hides and tries to subdue one of them, but to no avail. While she is held at gunpoint, she is told that all the males in the Oceanside community, aged 10 and above, were slaughtered by the Saviors and that Tara's group did not wipe them out, instead they have started a war. She is then saved from her pursuers by Cyndie, who then overtakes and confronts her. Cyndie makes Tara "swear" to never mention Oceanside to anyone and helps Tara find her way back to the bridge where she lost Heath. Tara finds evidence that Heath managed to escape the walker attack and continues to Alexandria alone.

After making her way back to Alexandria, Tara is greeted at the front gate by an emotional Eugene. In the infirmary, determined to seek revenge on the Saviors, Rosita asks Tara, despondent over the news of Denise's death, if she has any leads on guns or ammunition. Denying her discovery, Tara keeps her word to Cyndie and tells Rosita that she didn't find anything during her scouting mission.

== Reception ==
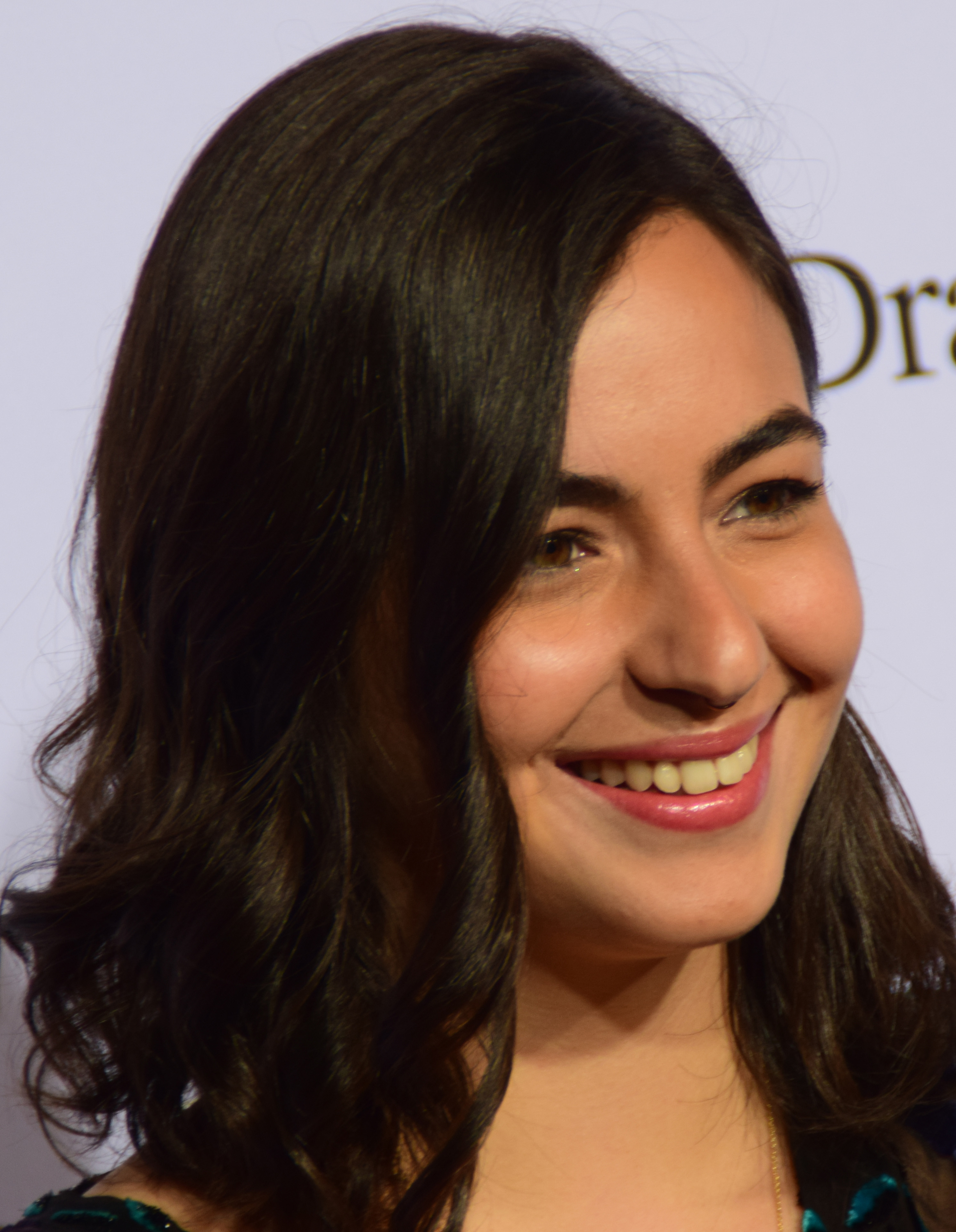
Alanna Masterson, who plays Tara Chambler, received negative reviews about the performance and the development of her debut as a main character in this episode.

=== Critical reception ===
"Swear" is considered to be one of the worst episodes of the series. On Rotten Tomatoes, it holds a 61% with an average rating of 6.38 out of 10, based on 31 reviews. The site's consensus reads: "Although its focus on a secondary character often leaves "Swear" feeling like a diversion, the discovery - and impending danger - of a new community is a refreshing development."

=== Ratings ===
The episode received a 4.9 Nielsen rating in the key 18-49 demographic with 10.40 million total viewers. At the time of broadcast, it was the lowest rating the show had since "Hounded" from season three.
