= Jordan Woods-Robinson =

American actor (born 1985)

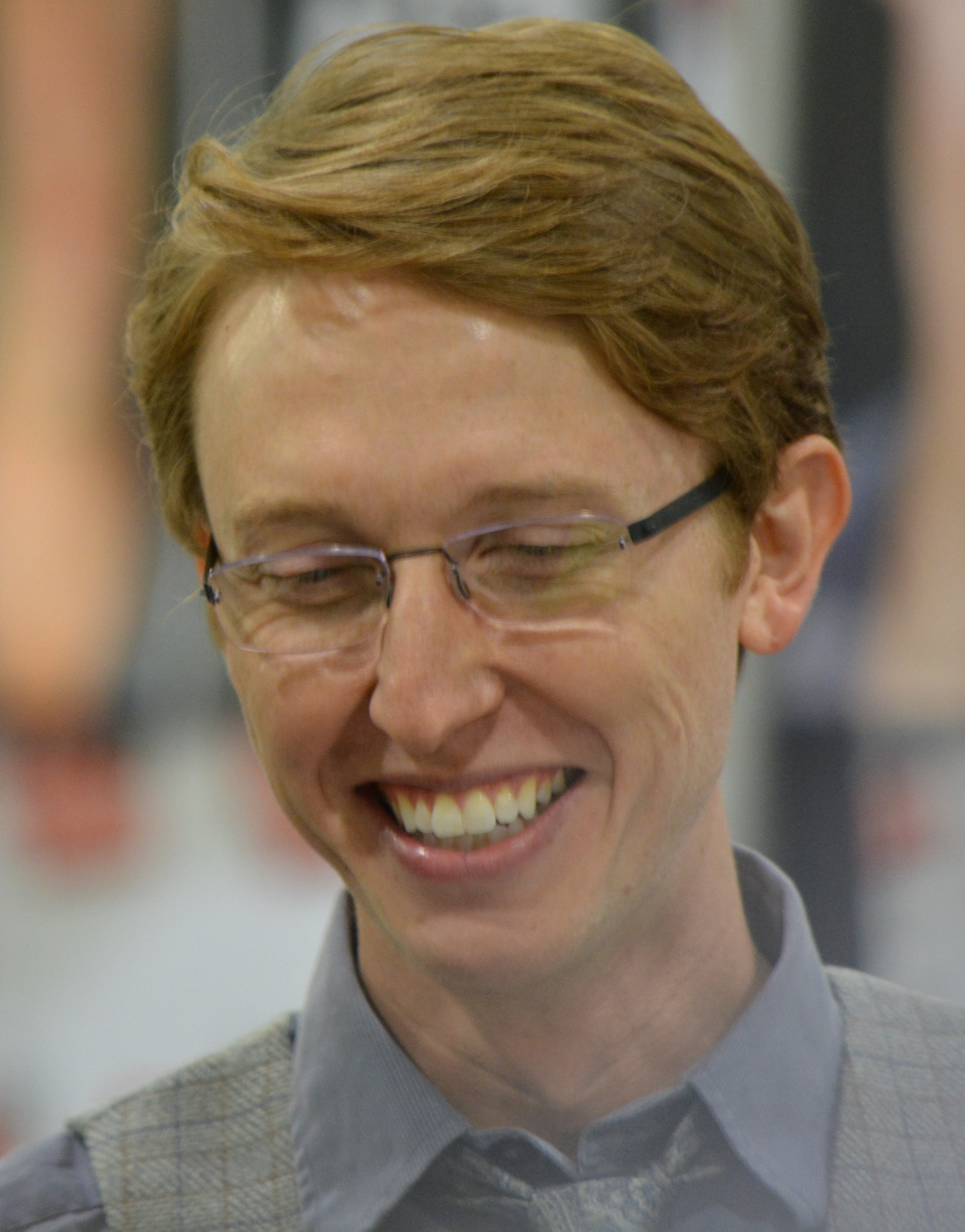
- Woods-Robinson at the 2016 San Diego Comic-Con
- Born: April 24, 1985 (age 41); Bybee, Tennessee, US
- Education: New York University Tisch School of the Arts
- Occupations: Actor, musician, composer
- Years active: 2007–present

Jordan Woods-Robinson (April 24, 1985) is an American actor, musician, and composer, He is best known for his portrayal of Eric Raleigh in The Walking Dead series. He has also appeared in Magic City and Drop Dead Diva.

== Early life and education ==
Woods-Robinson was born on April 24, 1985, in Bybee, Tennessee, on an animal rescue farm. He moved to New York City and graduated from the New York University Tisch School of the Arts.

== Career ==
A few weeks after graduation, Woods-Robinson auditioned for and was cast in the Blue Man Group as a Blue Man. He spent 13 years performing as a Blue Man in New York, Chicago, Las Vegas, Orlando, Boston, and on the Norwegian Epic cruise ship traveling between the Eastern and Western Caribbean ports and even a Mediterranean cruise.

While in Orlando, Woods-Robinson began his acting career and has appeared in popular productions such as The Walking Dead, Homeland, Nashville, The Hunger Games, Army Wives, and many other on-screen roles.

Woods-Robinson lives outside of Atlanta, with his wife and two children.

== Filmography ==
=== Film ===
Year	Title	Role	Notes
2006	Walls	Sam	Short
2009	Just Another Day	Customer #2	Short
2009	Scare Zone	Geek 1	
2010	Angel Camouflaged	Kip	
2011	A Little Bit of Heaven	Brett Boyle	(uncredited)
2012	Capital	Young	
2013	Missionary	Alan Whitehall	
2014	The Hunger Games: Mockingjay – Part 1	Snow's Stylist #1	
2014	Invaders	Driver	Short
2015	Solace	Mr. Oldfield	
2018	Time's Up	Young Adam	Short
2018	The Unfinished Case	William	
2019	Resemblance	Dirk Kramer	Short

=== Television ===
Year	Title	Role	Notes
2009	The Guiding Light	Bellman / Blue Man	1 episode
2009	Army Wives	Scott Keller	episode "About Face" season 3
2009	Drop Dead Diva	Perry Detweiller	Season 1, episode: "What If"
2012	Magic City	Sterling Voss	Recurring role 2 episodes
2014	Red Band Society	Ben Moody	Season 1, episode: "Sole Searching"
2015-2017	The Walking Dead	Eric Raleigh	Recurring role, 17 episodes (Season 5-8)
2016	Good Behavior	Nate	2 episodes (2016-2017).
2017	Nashville	Randall St. Claire	Season 5, 4 episodes.
2018	Homeland	Troll	Season 7, Episode 2: "Rebel Rebel"
2019	David Makes Man	Gerald	Season 1, Episode 4: "Gloria"
2019	The Right Stuff	Mike Turley	Season 1, Episode 2: "#1.2"

== Discography ==
- Red Haired Boy (2015)
- Anthem (2016)
