= Katelyn Nacon =

American actress (born 1999)

- Nacon in The Walking Dead
- Occupation: Actress
- Years active: 2013–present

Katelyn Nacon is an American actress who played Elisia Brown in the go90 web series Tagged (2016–2018) and Enid on The Walking Dead (2015–2019). She also stars in Linoleum (2022) and Southern Gospel (2023).

== Personal life ==
Katelyn Nacon attended Woodstock High School, in Woodstock, Georgia.

== Career ==
Nacon began her acting career with a role in the film Loving Generously. Her first television appearance was on Resurrection. She appeared on Adult Swim's Too Many Cooks, a short film that went viral on YouTube. She portrayed Elisia on T@gged. Her most notable role is Enid on The Walking Dead where she was a main character in season 9.

In 2015, Nacon released her first EP, Love in May.

In 2018, Nacon released a new single, Undone.

== Filmography ==
Year	Title	Role	Notes
2013	Psychology of Secrets	Patti	Film
2013	Second Chances	Cami	Film
2014	Resurrection	Girl	Episode: "Us Against the World"
2014	Too Many Cooks	Chloe Cook	TV shorts
2014	Another Assembly	Mya	Film
2015–2019	The Walking Dead	Enid	Guest role (season 5); Recurring role (seasons 6–7); Also starring (season 8); Main role (season 9)
2016–2018	T@gged	Elisia Brown	Main role
2019	Light as a Feather	Sammi Karras	Main role (season 2)
2022	Linoleum	Nora Edwin	Film
2023	Southern Gospel	Julie Ledbetter	Film
2024	Familiar Touch	Sophie	Film
2025	I Didn't Like You	Max	Short film
2025	Hacked: A Double Entendre of Rage Fueled Karma	Kate	Film
2025	Chicago Fire	Jade Taylor	Episode: "Cut Me Open"
2026	The Rookie	Driver	Episode: Dead Ringer

== Awards and nominations ==
Year	Award	Category	Work	Result	Refs
2016	Young Artist Awards	Best Performance in a TV Series – Recurring Young Actress (14–21)	The Walking Dead	Nominated	
2017	Young Artist Awards	Best Performance in a TV Series – Recurring Teen Actress	The Walking Dead	Nominated	
