= The Bridge (The Walking Dead) =

- The Walking Dead episode
- Episode no.: Season 9 Episode 2
- Directed by: Daisy von Scherler Mayer
- Written by: David Leslie Johnson-McGoldrick
- Cinematography by: Stephen Campbell
- Editing by: Jack Colwell
- Original air date: October 14, 2018
- Running time: 45 minutes

Guest appearances
- Cooper Andrews as Jerry; Brett Butler as Tammy Rose; John Finn as Earl; Rhys Coiro as Jed; Zach McGowan as Justin; Sydney Park as Cyndie; Elizabeth Ludlow as Arat; Lindsley Register as Laura; Traci Dinwiddie as Regina

Episode chronology
← Previous "A New Beginning"	Next → "Warning Signs"
- The Walking Dead season 9

"The Bridge" is the second episode of the ninth season of the post-apocalyptic horror television series The Walking Dead, which aired on AMC on October 14, 2018. It was written by David Leslie Johnson-McGoldrick and directed by Daisy von Scherler Mayer.

== Plot ==
Rick speaks to an unseen individual about the status of the communities over the past month as they work to rebuild the washed-out bridge. Earlier that day, Rick oversees the makeshift camp where most of his close allies help to watch over the Saviors as they labor in rebuilding the bridge. Eugene keeps him up to date on progress, noting that they have not been able to account for a half-dozen Savior walk-offs, and that they plan to detonate a roadblock later that day and that they have plans to route a nearby walker horde away using sirens. Rick sees Siddiq has trained Enid in basic field medic work, and has Siddiq return to the safety of the communities.

Michonne goes to the Hilltop to speak to Maggie. Michonne knows that the Hilltop was waiting for a supply of ethanol being produced at the Sanctuary, which they would exchange for food to provide to the Saviors, but the supply has gone missing; Michonne requests Maggie provide the food on trust that they will get the ethanol. Maggie refuses, pointing out that they have no fuel for their tractor, and with Earl, their blacksmith, being held in custody, they cannot repair the plow they took from the museum, and thus must conserve their food supply. Michonne urges Maggie to reconsider, but Maggie remains steadfast that Earl must be punished.

During work at the bridge, as Henry is passing out water, Justin, a Savior, tries to take more than his share and pushes Henry. Daryl rushes in to subdue Justin before Rick can assert his control on the group. Rick and Daryl realize the Saviors are starting to get out of hand, due to Rick's hurry to finish the bridge and the lack of food. Later, they set off the dynamite, and track the nearby walker horde as it diverts toward the first siren. However, when the second siren, manned by Justin, fails to sound, Rick realizes the group of men at a logging site nearby are in trouble. There, Daryl sees the horde and orders everyone to flee, but in the haste, Aaron's arm is crushed under a giant log. Rick and the others arrive to help defend them, allowing Daryl to rush Aaron to the medical tent. Enid is perplexed at the injury and determines the only action they can take is to amputate Aaron's arm. The surgery is successful, but Daryl takes full blame for Aaron's loss. Daryl chastises Justin for failing to sound the alarm. Justin claims their radio equipment failed, but Daryl refuses to accept this excuse, and beats Justin; later, Rick throws Justin out of the camp.

Maggie does allow Tammy to see Earl under her watch, and learns that Earl's actions were a result of Gregory giving him his first drink of alcohol in years. After some time, Maggie relents; she allows Earl to return to his blacksmith work under guard, and agrees to provide the food to Michonne, as well as being open to discuss a code of laws between the communities, as long as she retains some authority at Hilltop. Meanwhile at the worksite, Anne and Gabriel start to recognize a bond between them, and Carol and Ezekiel discuss their relationship.

That night, Rick's conversation continues, revealed to be with Negan, who is held in a cell within Alexandria. Negan cares little for how Rick is rebuilding the communities, saying that Rick isn't saving the world, he's just getting it ready for Negan's return to power. Anne keeps watch at night and spots a helicopter flying overhead. Justin, walking alone back to Sanctuary, appears to see someone he recognizes before the figure jumps and attacks him.

== Reception ==
=== Critical reception ===
On Rotten Tomatoes, the episode has a perfect approval rating of 100% with an average score of 7.35 out of 10 based on 21 reviews. The critical consensus reads: "A slower burn than the premiere, "The Bridge" is a compelling character study that lays necessary foundations for future installments." "The Bridge" was praised for the direction, writing, and Marquand's emotional performance.

=== Ratings ===
"The Bridge" received a total viewership of 4.95 million with a 2.0 rating in adults aged 18–49. Although it was the highest-rated cable program of the night, the episode marked a decrease in viewership from the season premiere and is the lowest rated episode of The Walking Dead since season one's "Vatos" which had 4.7 million viewers.
