= The Walking Dead season 9 =

The Walking Dead
- Season 9
- Promotional poster art prominently featuring lead character Rick Grimes (foreground)
- Showrunner: Angela Kang
- Starring: Andrew Lincoln; Norman Reedus; Lauren Cohan; Danai Gurira; Melissa McBride; Alanna Masterson; Josh McDermitt; Christian Serratos; Seth Gilliam; Ross Marquand; Katelyn Nacon; Tom Payne; Jeffrey Dean Morgan; Khary Payton; Samantha Morton; Xander Berkeley; Pollyanna McIntosh; Callan McAuliffe; Avi Nash
- No. of episodes: 16

Release
- Original network: AMC
- Original release: October 7, 2018 – March 31, 2019

Season chronology
- ← Previous; Season 8 Next → Season 10

The ninth season of The Walking Dead, an American post-apocalyptic horror television series on AMC premiered on October 7, 2018, and concluded on March 31, 2019, consisting of 16 episodes. Developed for television by Frank Darabont, the series is based on the eponymous series of comic books by Robert Kirkman, Tony Moore, and Charlie Adlard. The executive producers are Kirkman, David Alpert, Scott M. Gimple, Angela Kang, Greg Nicotero, Tom Luse, Denise Huth, and Gale Anne Hurd, with Kang taking over the role of showrunner from Gimple after his promotion to chief content officer for the franchise.

This season adapts material from issues #127–144 of the comic book series and focuses on the aftermath of All Out War. Eighteen months after the defeat of Negan (Jeffrey Dean Morgan) under an alliance of communities spearheaded by Rick Grimes (Andrew Lincoln), the season focuses on the united communities as they face obstacles and dangers both outside and inside their alliance, with the threat of the mysterious Whisperers looming.

The ninth season is the final season for lead actor Andrew Lincoln, who has portrayed Rick Grimes since the series' first season. Lauren Cohan appeared as Maggie Greene in a diminished role and only appeared in the first five episodes of this season due to other commitments; Cohan returned as a series regular in season 10.

== Cast ==
=== Main cast ===
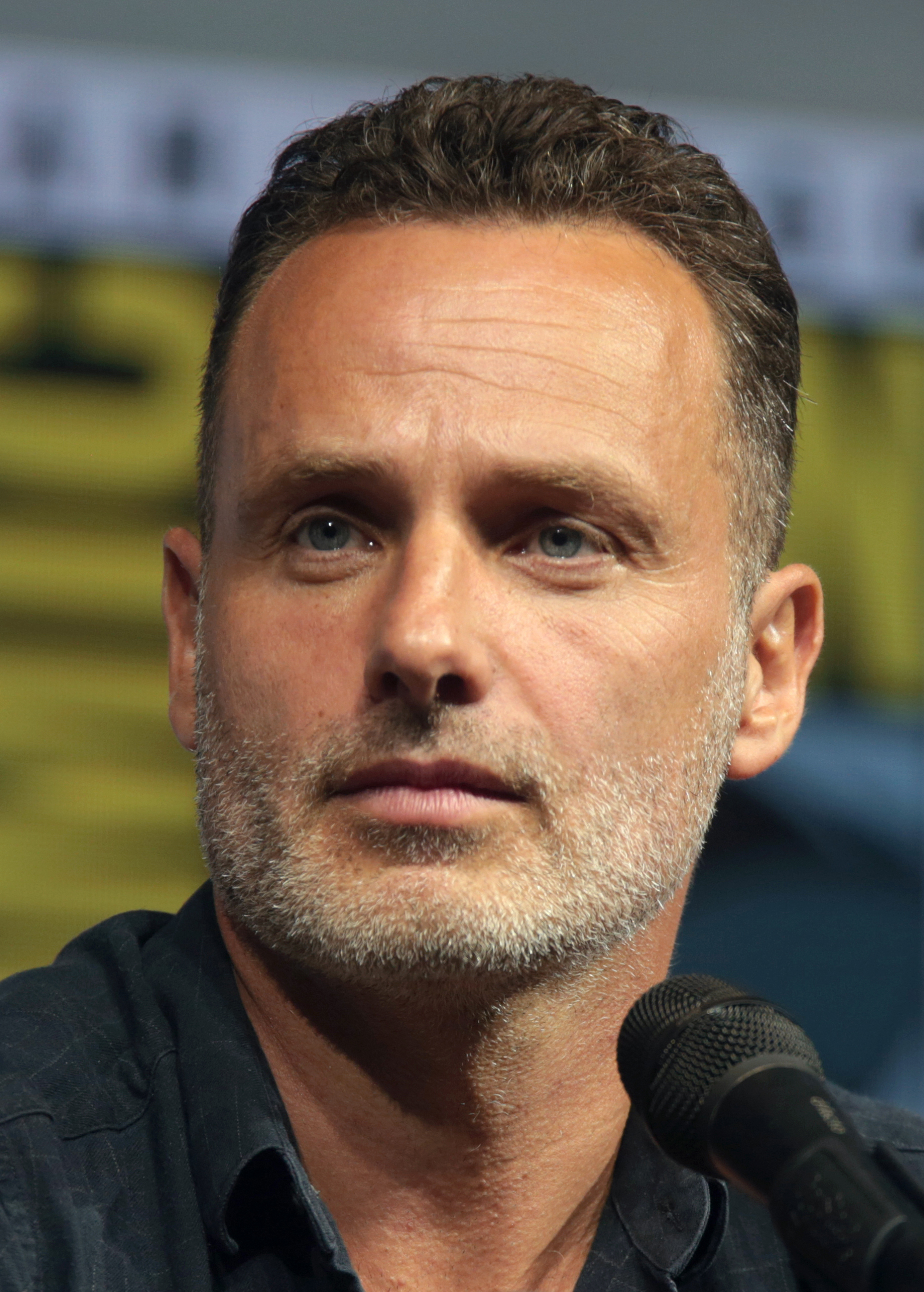
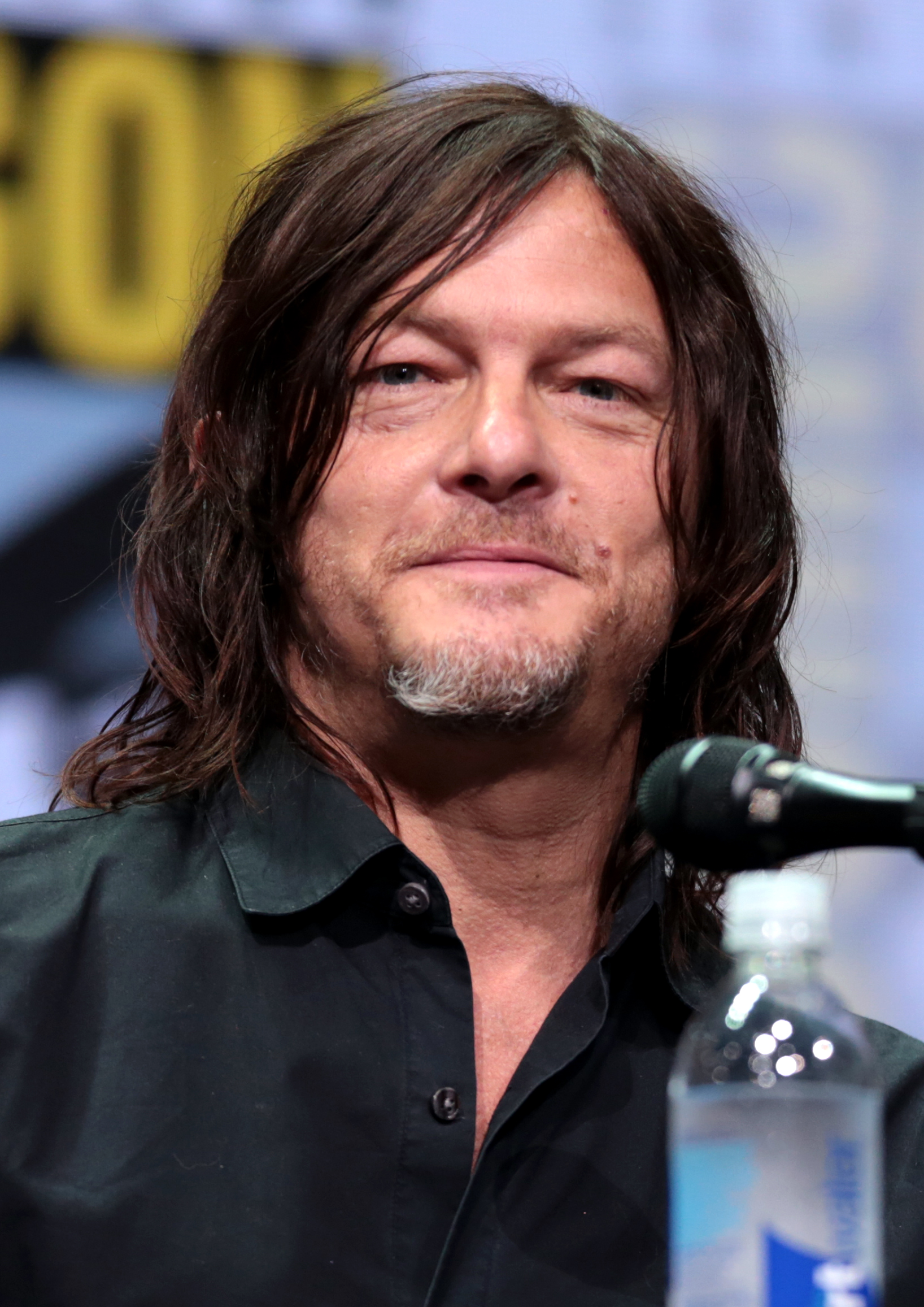
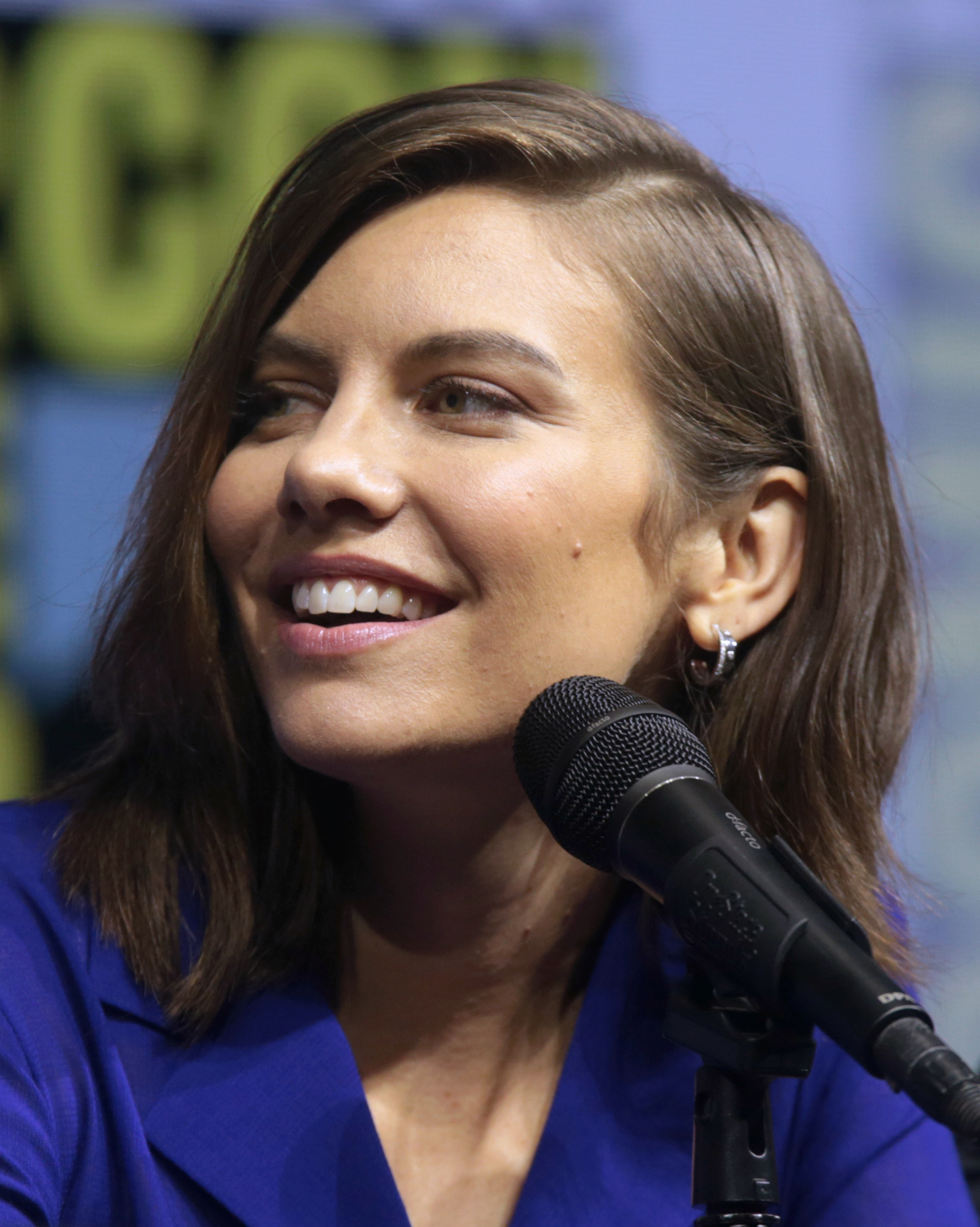
Andrew Lincoln (Rick Grimes), Norman Reedus (Daryl Dixon), and Lauren Cohan (Maggie Greene)
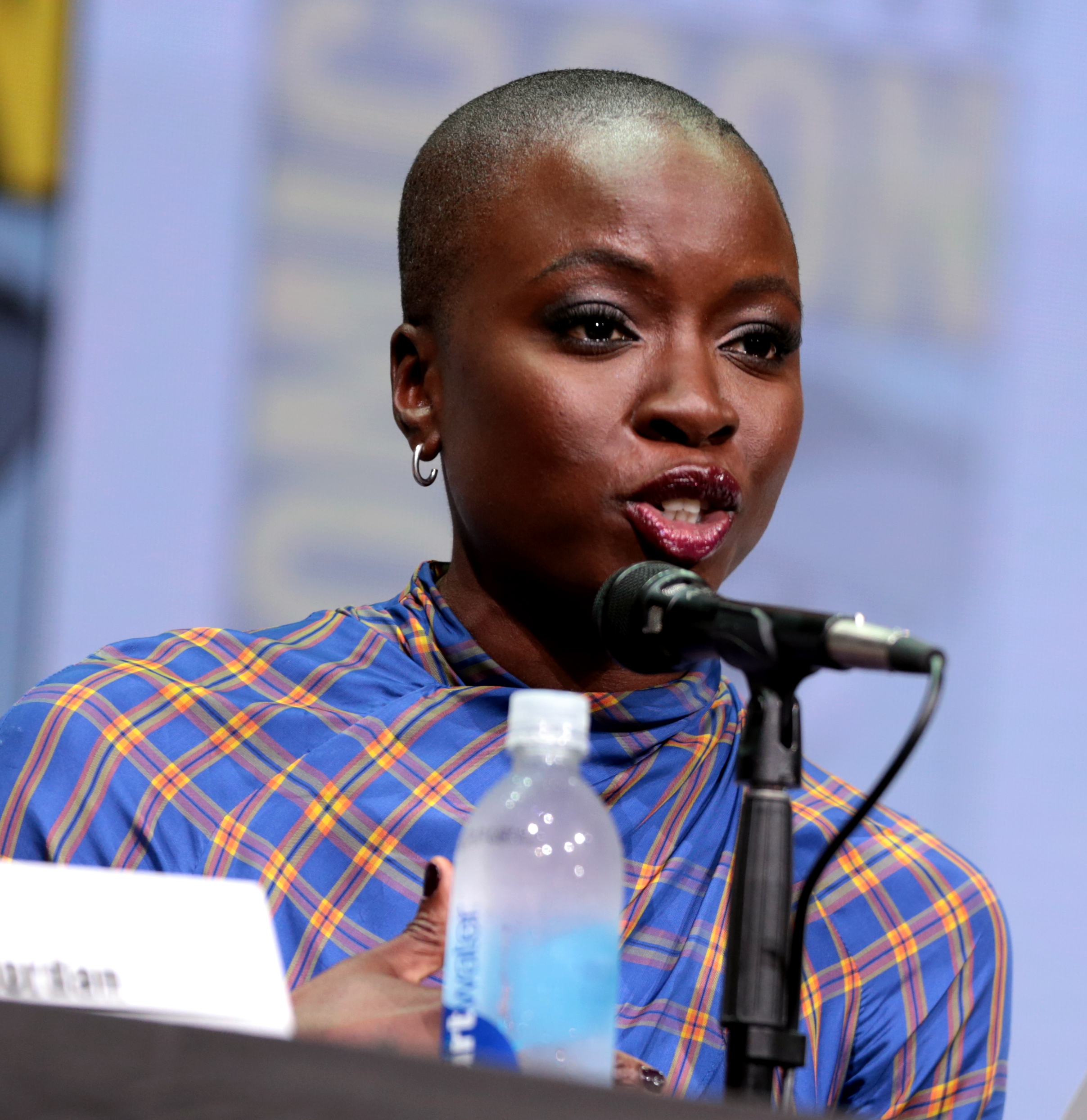
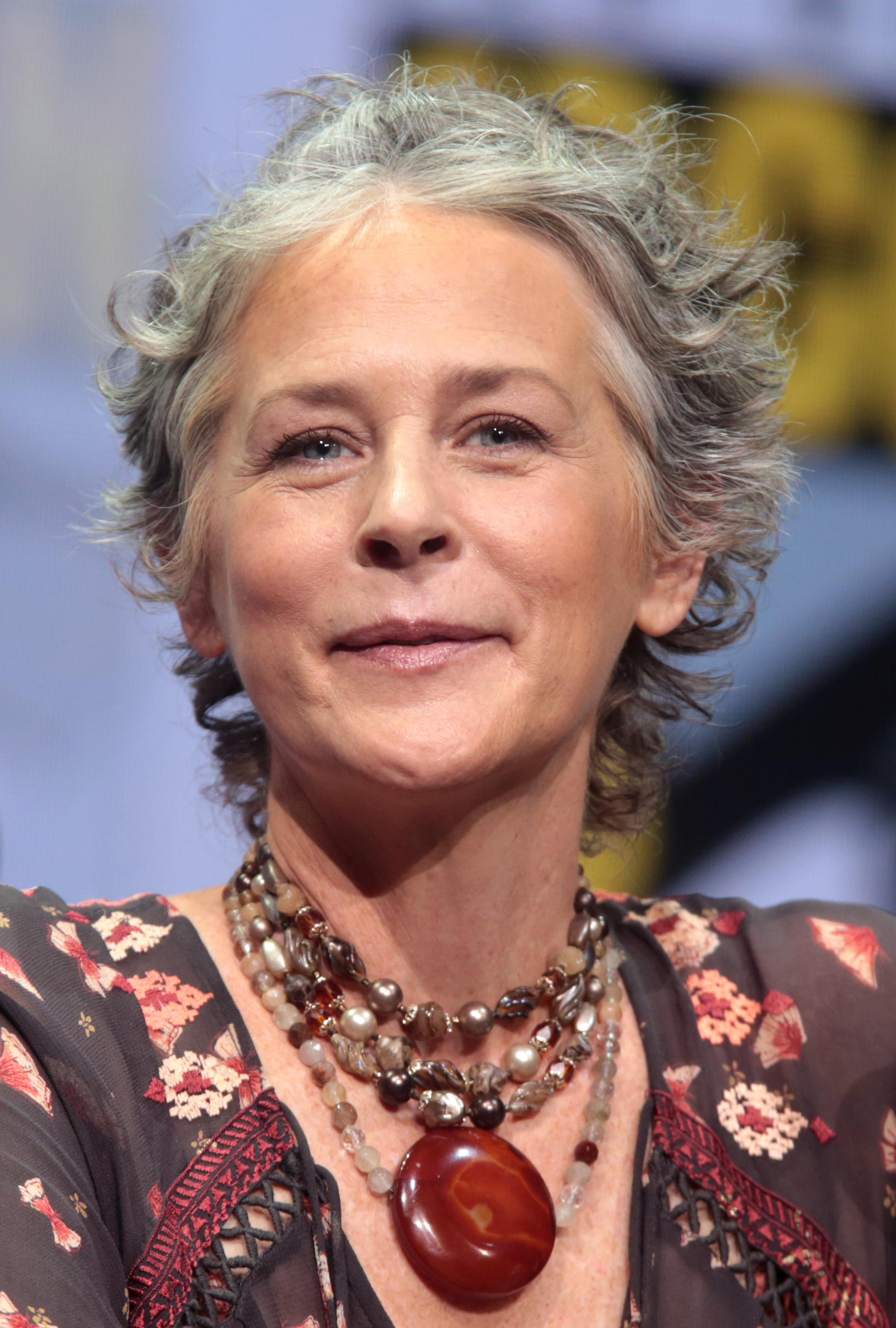
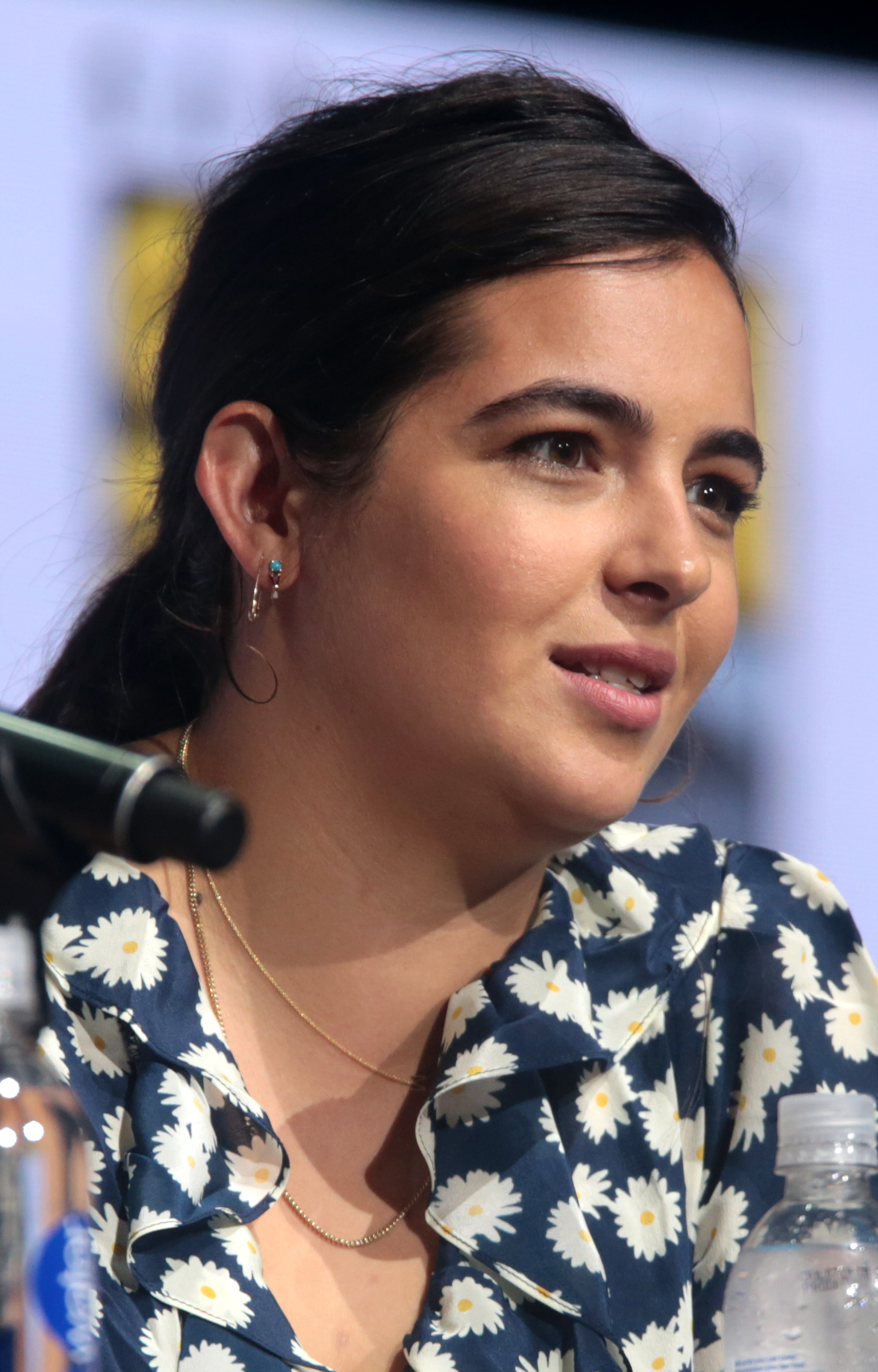
Danai Gurira (Michonne), Melissa McBride (Carol Peletier), and Alanna Masterson (Tara Chambler)
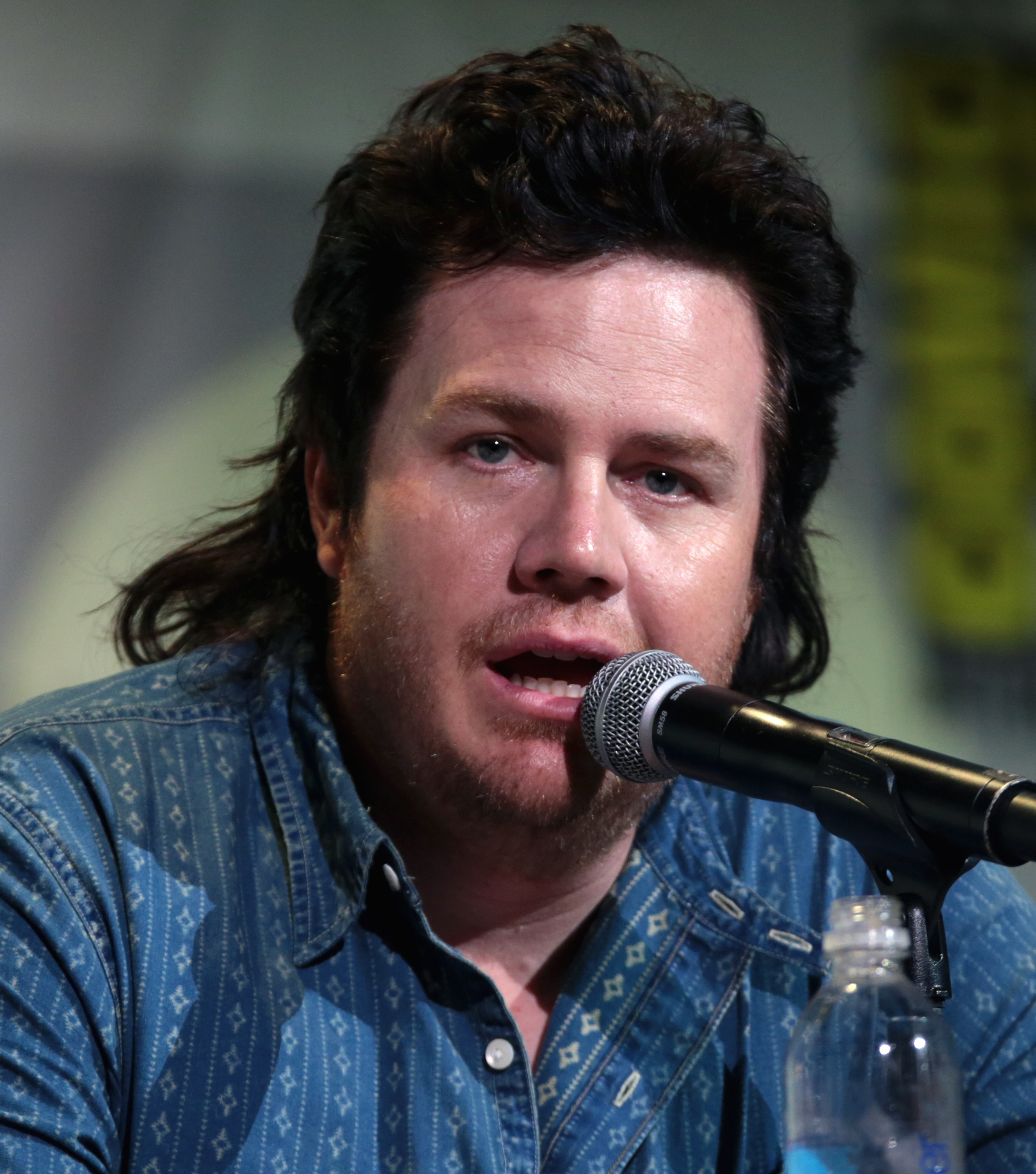
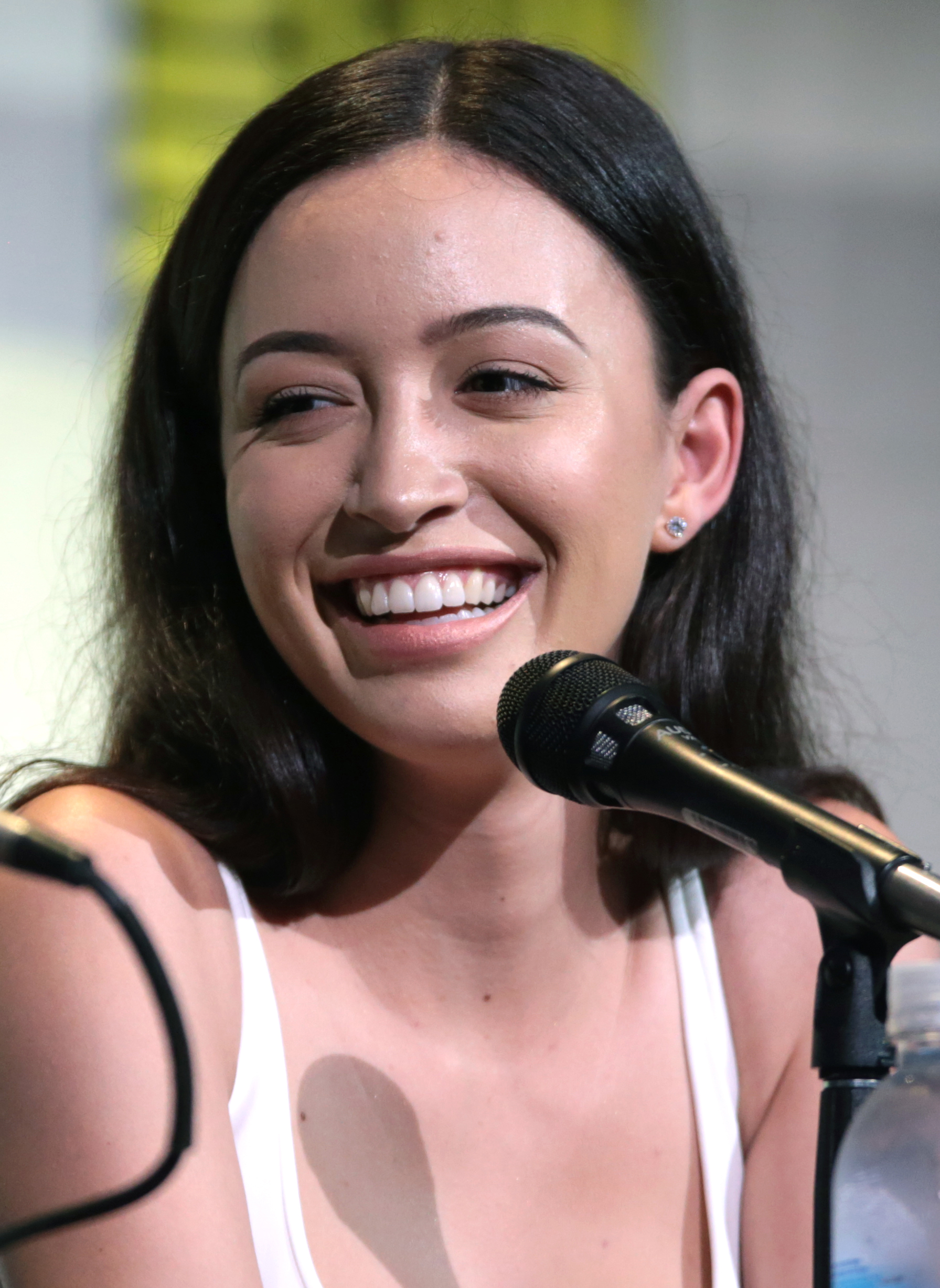
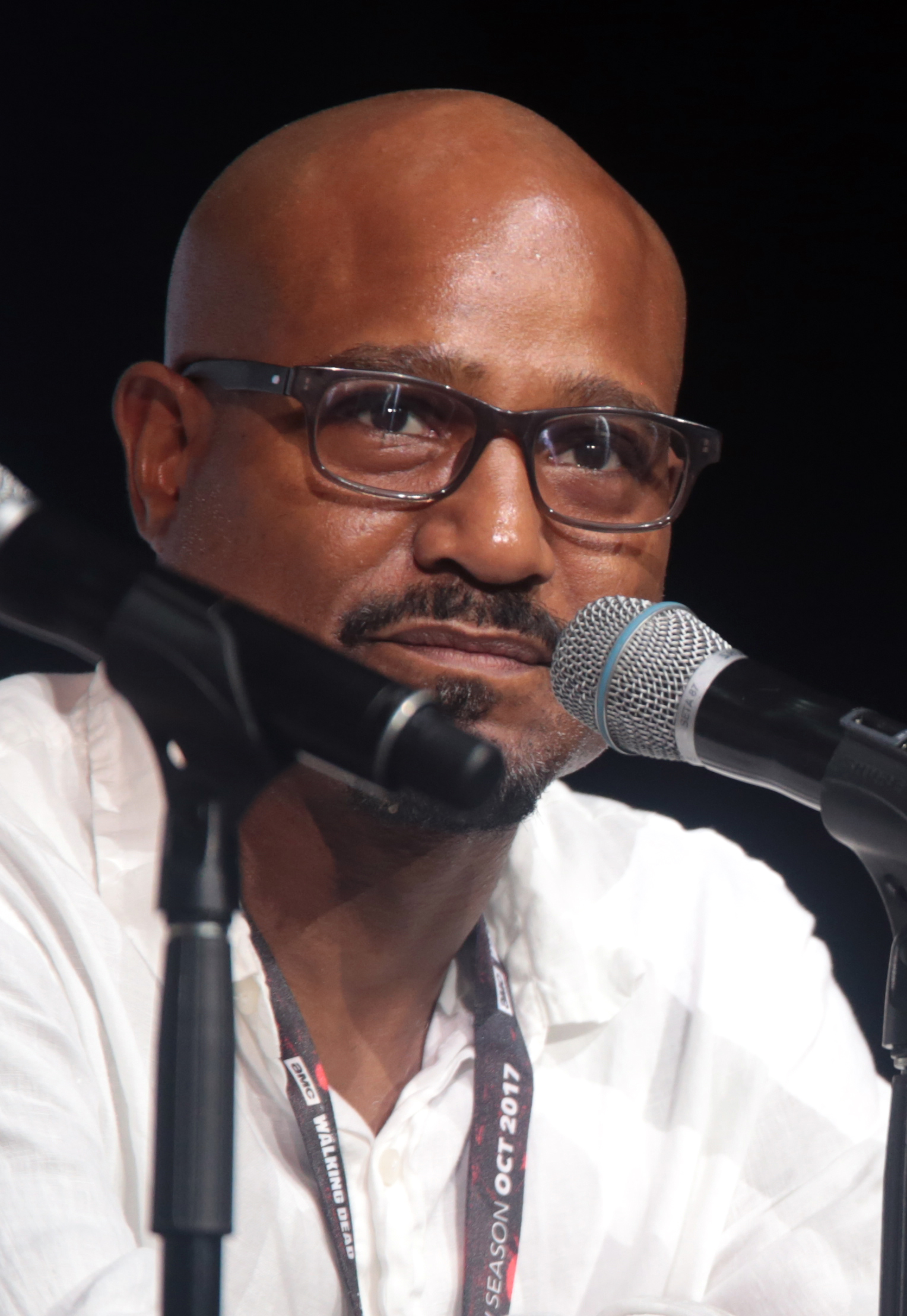
Josh McDermitt (Eugene Porter), Christian Serratos (Rosita Espinosa), and Seth Gilliam (Gabriel Stokes)
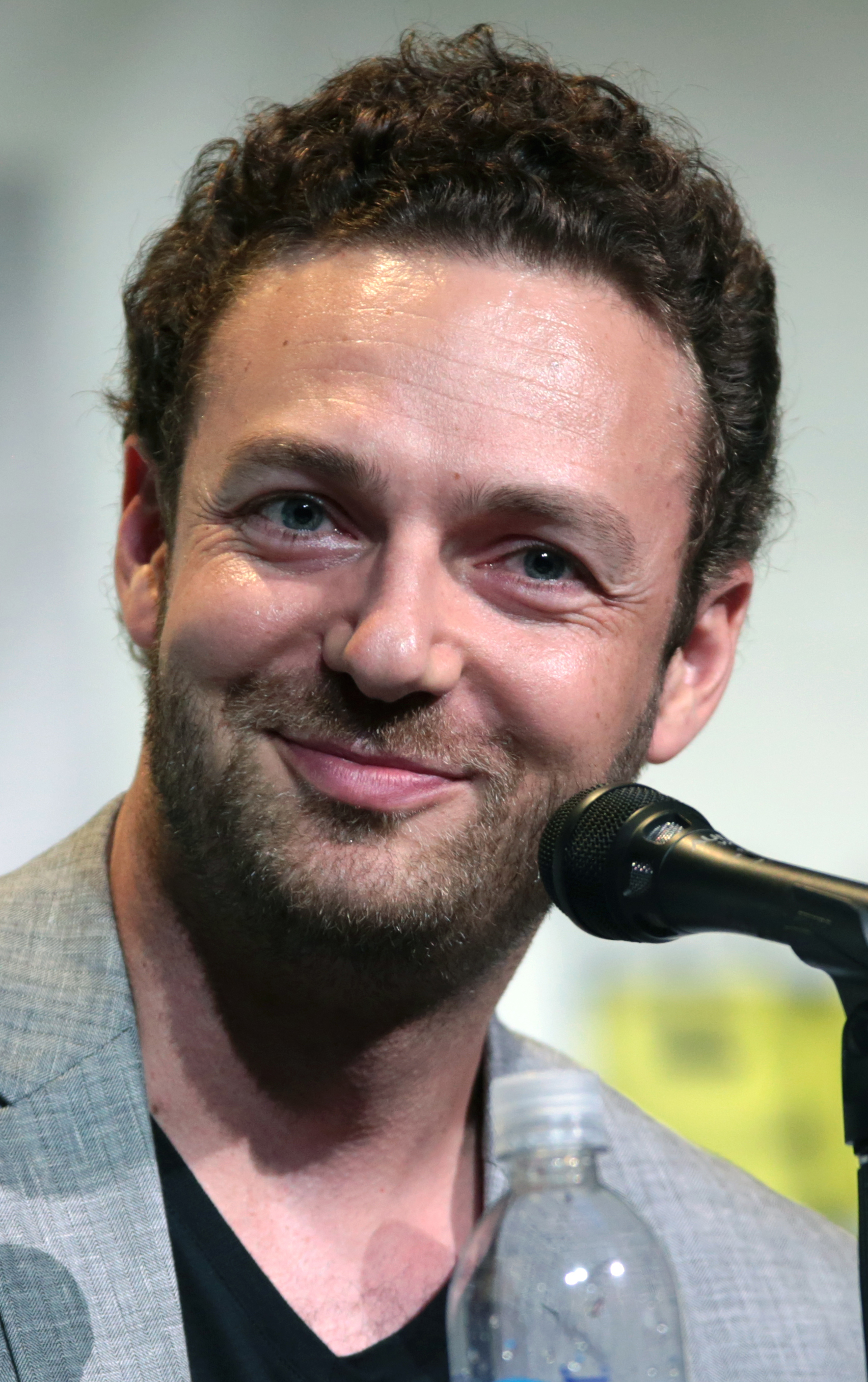
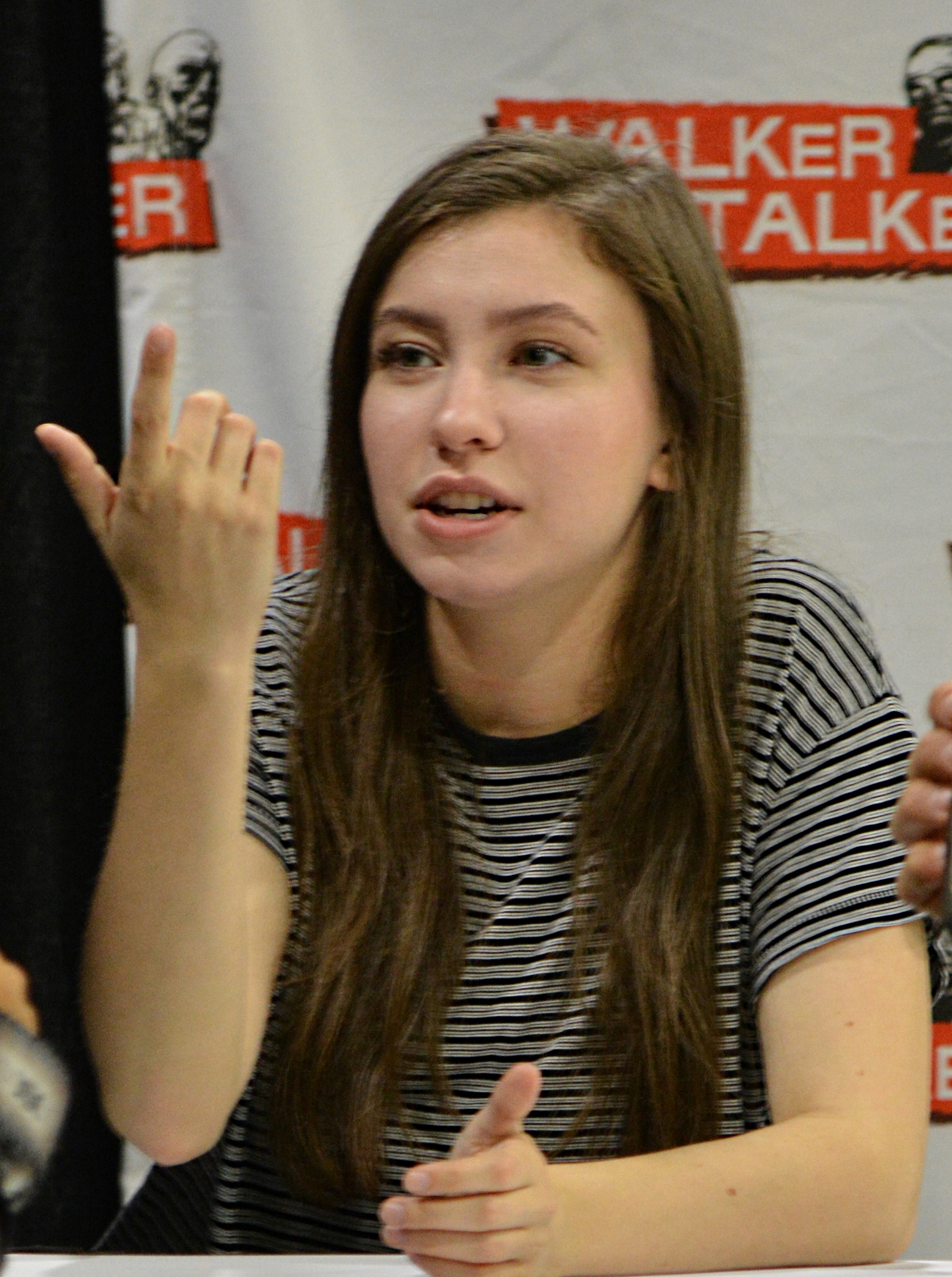
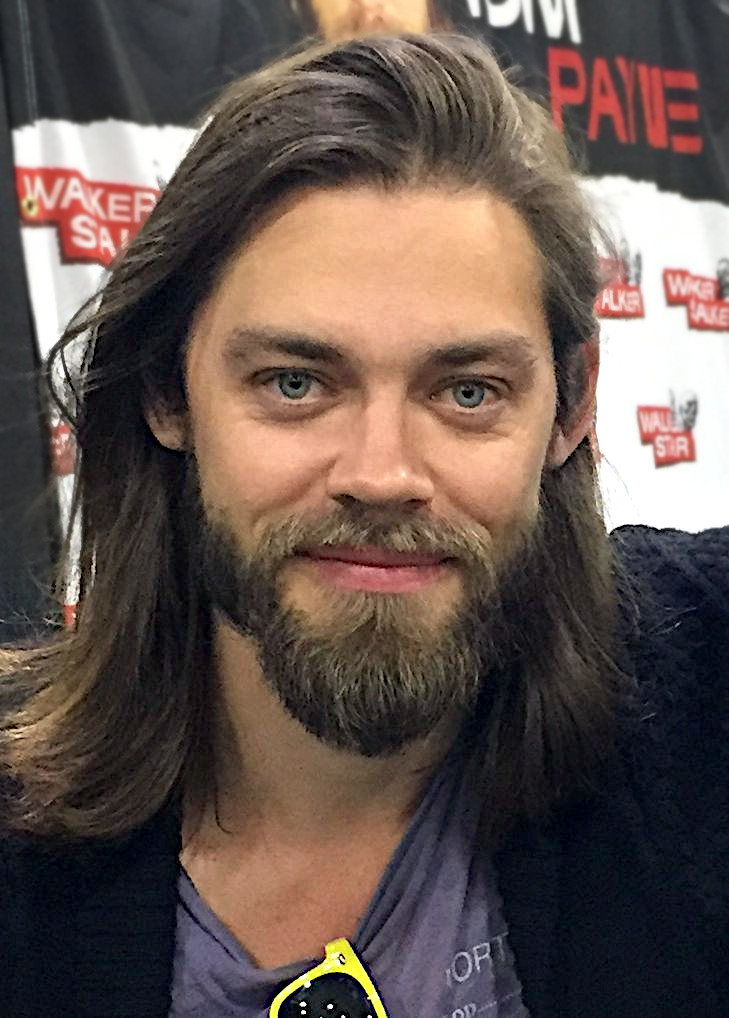
Ross Marquand (Aaron), Katelyn Nacon (Enid), and Tom Payne (Paul "Jesus" Rovia)
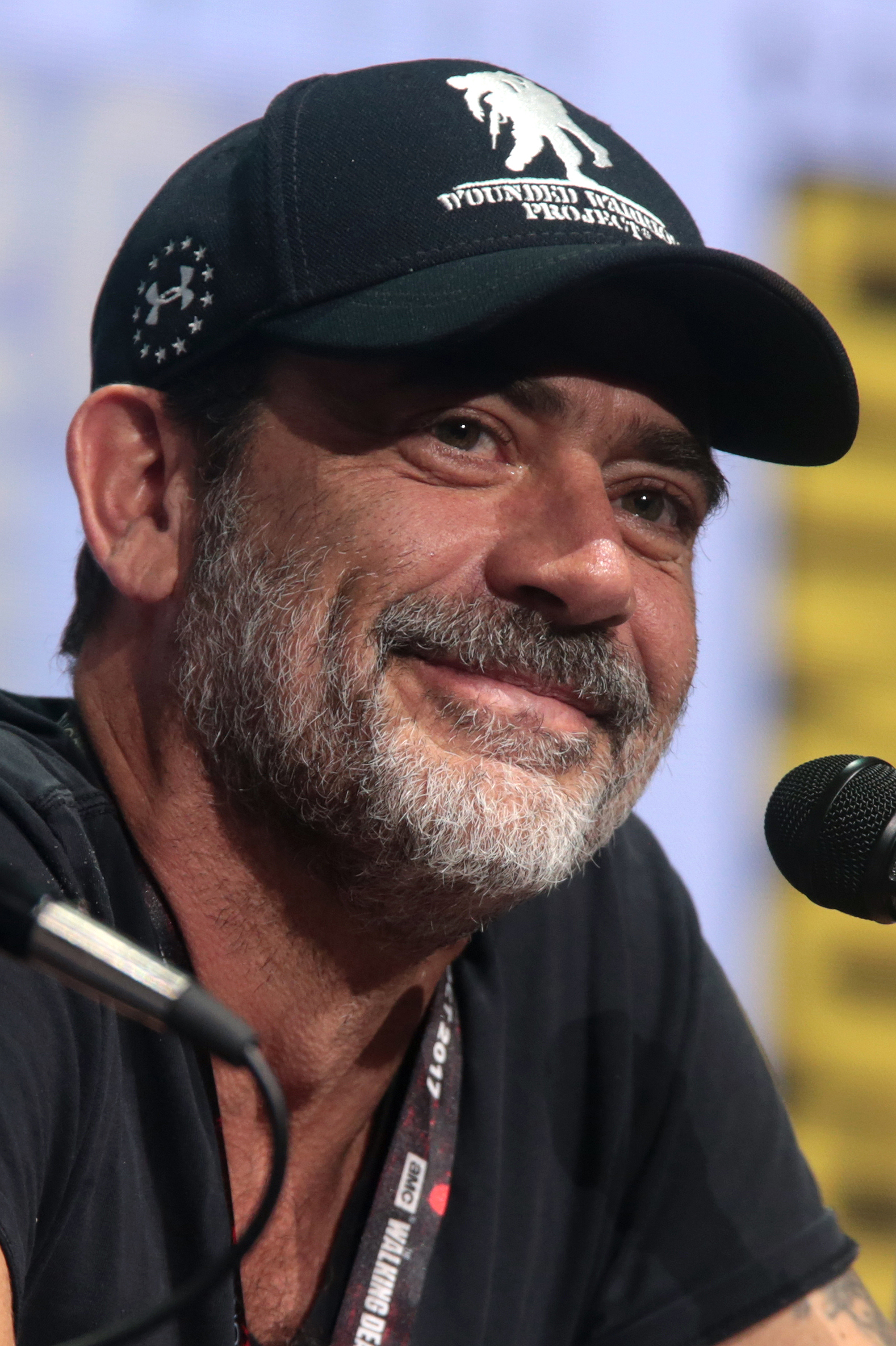
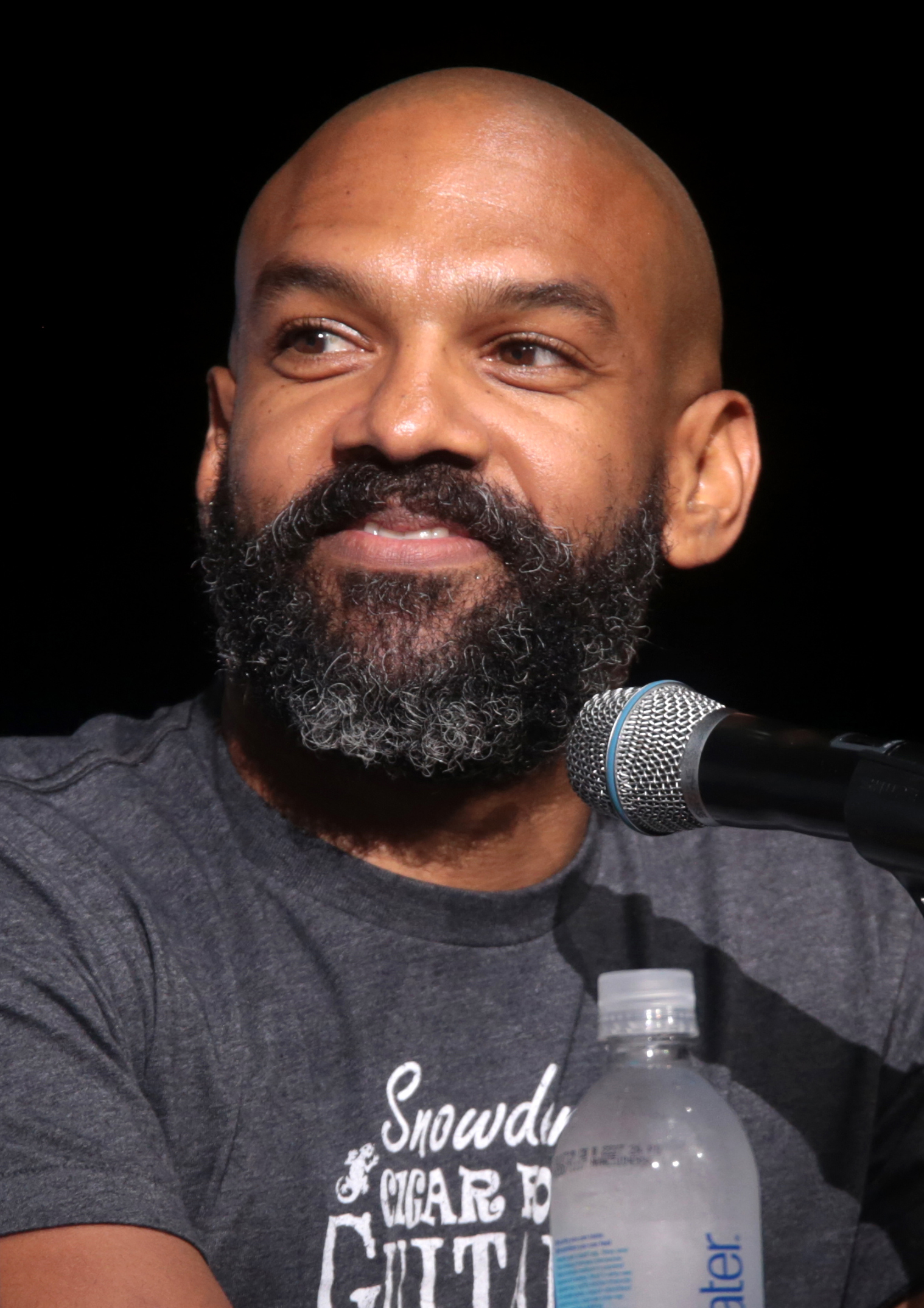
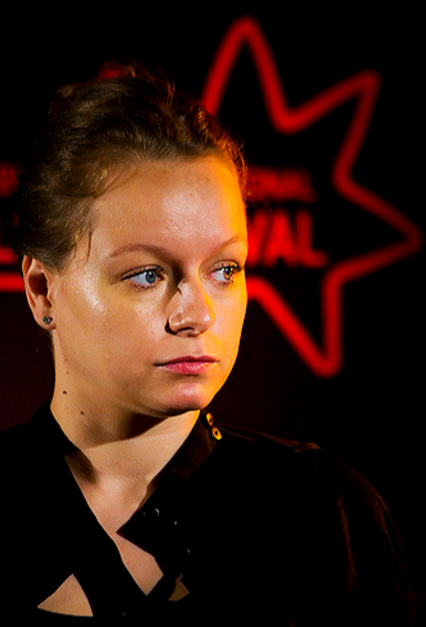
Jeffrey Dean Morgan (Negan), Khary Payton (Ezekiel), and Samantha Morton (Alpha)
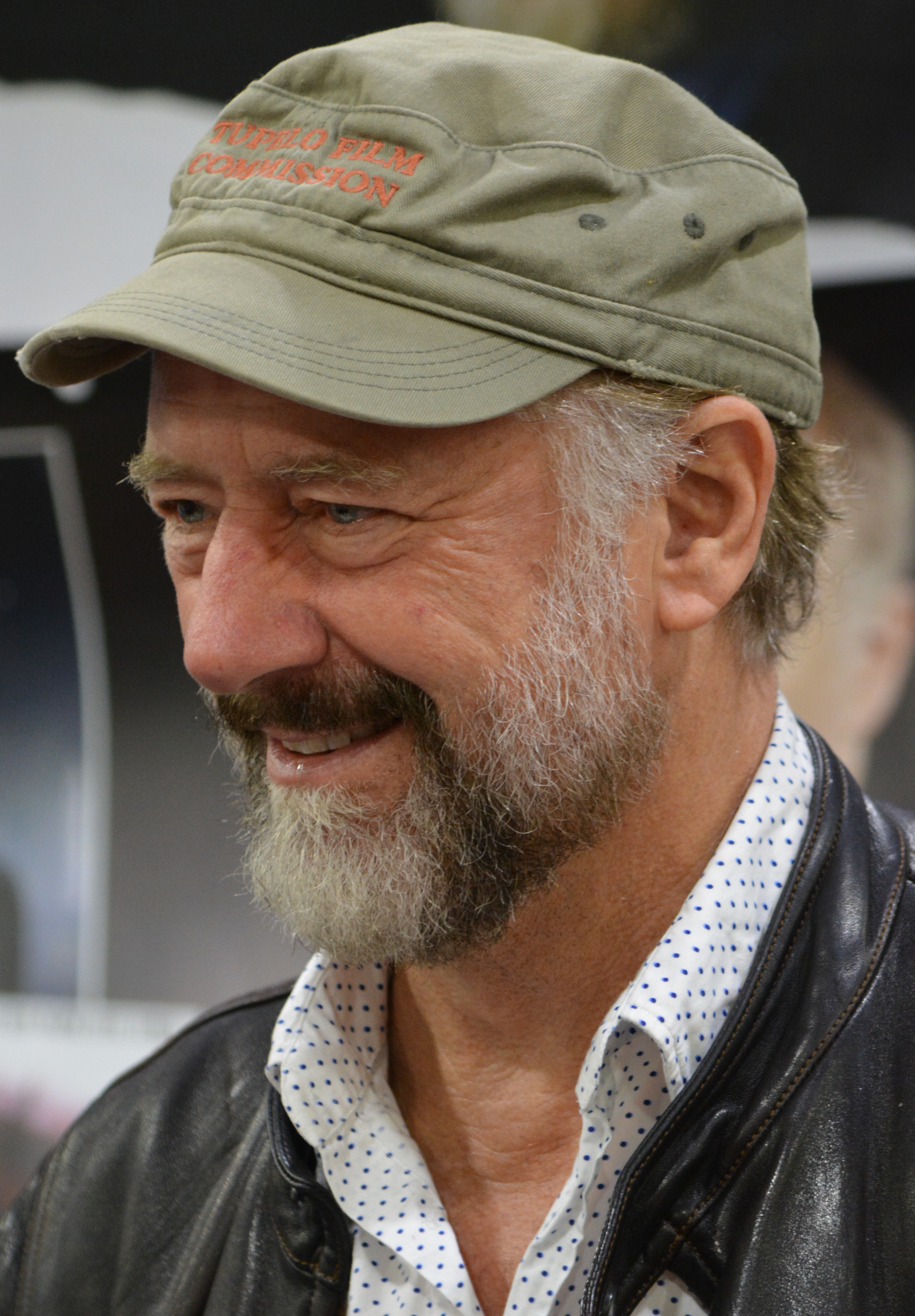
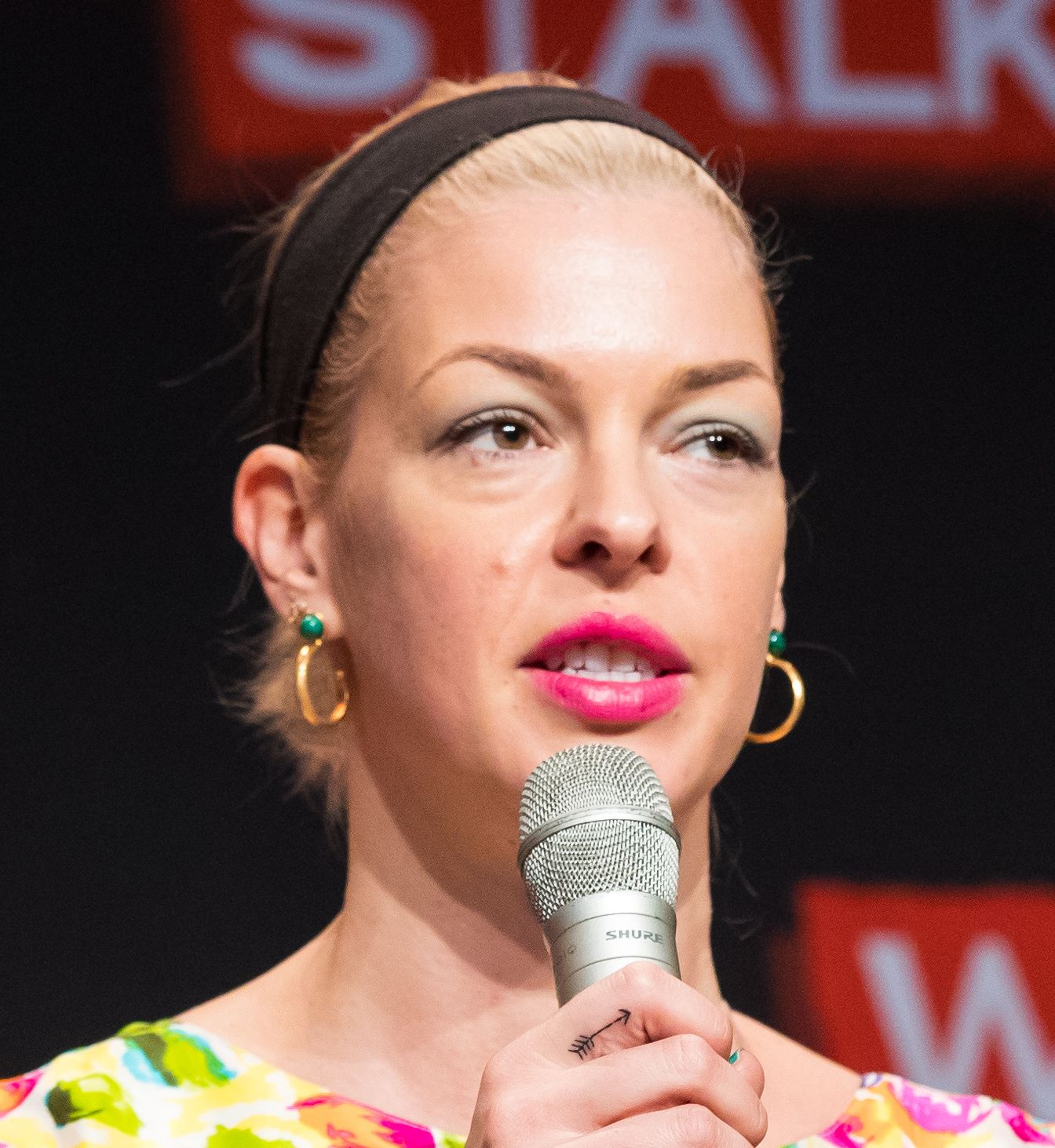
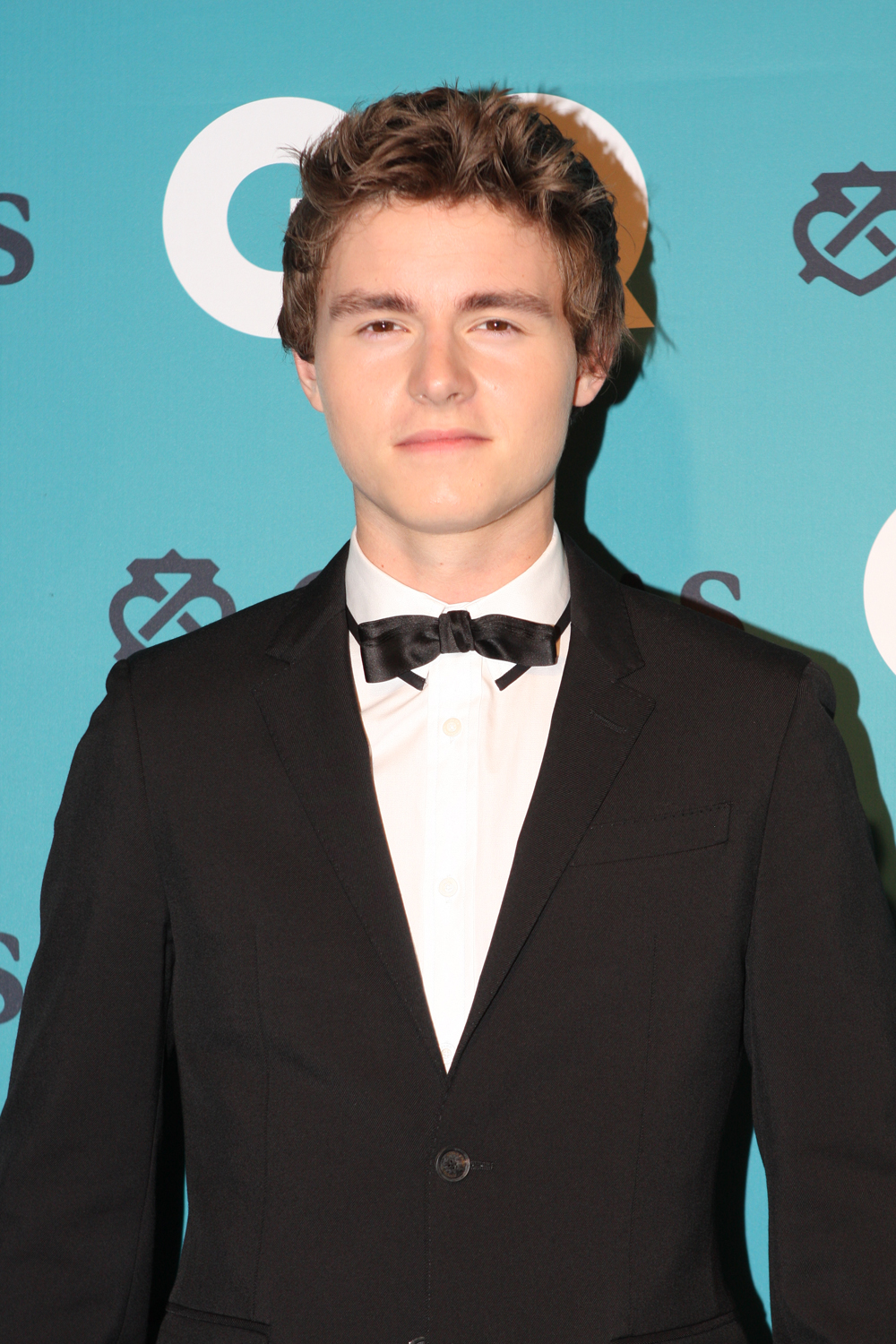
Xander Berkeley (Gregory), Pollyanna McIntosh (Anne), and Callan McAuliffe (Alden)

The ninth season features nineteen series regulars overall. For this season, Katelyn Nacon and Tom Payne were added to the opening credits, along with Khary Payton as of the season's sixth episode, after previously being credited as "also starring". Callan McAuliffe and Avi Nash were promoted to series regular status, after previously having recurring roles. Samantha Morton joined the cast as a series regular and was added to the opening credits beginning with episode ten.

==== Starring ====
- Andrew Lincoln as Rick Grimes, the protagonist of the series. Rick is a former sheriff's deputy from King County, Georgia, and the former leader of the rebuilt Alexandria. He is coping with the recent death of his son Carl, while raising his daughter Judith with his romantic partner Michonne.
- Norman Reedus as Daryl Dixon, Rick's right-hand man. Daryl is a skilled hunter and a former recruiter for Alexandria. He had been running the Sanctuary since the downfall of Negan but later steps out of the position.
- Lauren Cohan as Maggie Greene, Glenn's widow, a mother figure to Enid and the former leader of the Hilltop. She is mother to her and Glenn's child, Hershel. She is at odds with Rick over sparing the life of Negan, the former leader of the Saviors.
- Danai Gurira as Michonne, a katana-wielding warrior and Rick's romantic partner. She is also a mother figure to Judith and mother to her and Rick's child.
- Melissa McBride as Carol Peletier, a survivor who has overcome several traumas, is a skilled and ingenious fighter, and now resides at the Kingdom with her husband Ezekiel.
- Alanna Masterson as Tara Chambler, a supply runner of Alexandria who served as a liaison to Oceanside, is now at peace with the former Saviors, and resides at the Hilltop.
- Josh McDermitt as Eugene Porter, a cowardly but intelligent survivor who was instrumental in defeating the Saviors and won back the group's trust. He also secretly has feelings for Rosita.
- Christian Serratos as Rosita Espinosa, a pragmatic member of the group who was the former partner of the now-deceased Abraham.
- Seth Gilliam as Gabriel Stokes, a priest who has reconciled his beliefs with what needs to be done to survive.
- Ross Marquand as Aaron, a recruiter from Alexandria who lost his boyfriend Eric during the war, and now raises his adoptive daughter, Gracie.
- Katelyn Nacon as Enid, a survivor of the Hilltop and a daughter figure to Maggie who was learning medicine from Siddiq.
- Tom Payne as Paul "Jesus" Rovia, a Hilltop recruiter and Maggie's right-hand man who serves as her voice of reason.
- Jeffrey Dean Morgan as Negan, the former leader of the Saviors and previous antagonist, who is incarcerated following his defeat in the previous season.
- Khary Payton as Ezekiel, the charismatic leader of the Kingdom who helped Rick defeat Negan and his Saviors. He is married to Carol.
- Samantha Morton as Alpha, the leader of the Whisperers, a mysterious group of survivors who wear the skins of walkers to mask their presence, and the main antagonist of the second half of the season.

==== Also starring ====
- Xander Berkeley as Gregory, the arrogant, selfish, and treacherous former leader of the Hilltop who is adjusting under Maggie's leadership.
- Pollyanna McIntosh as Anne, the former leader of the Scavengers (previously known as "Jadis") who has since integrated into Alexandria.
- Callan McAuliffe as Alden, a former member of the Saviors who had defected to Maggie's group during the war against Negan.
- Avi Nash as Siddiq, a former vagabond and doctor who was rescued by Carl before his death.

=== Supporting cast ===
==== Alexandria Safe-Zone ====
- Kenric Green as Scott, a supply runner in Alexandria.
- Mandi Christine Kerr as Barbara, a resident of Alexandria.
- Tamara Austin as Nora, a resident of Alexandria and Michonne's friend.
- Jennifer Riker as Mrs. Robinson, a resident and gardener of Alexandria.
- Lindsley Register as Laura, a former lieutenant of the Saviors and former gardener of the Sanctuary. She defected to Alexandria after the events of the bridge rebuilding.
- Matt Mangum as D.J., a former hostile lieutenant of the Saviors and former guardian of the Sanctuary. He also defected to Alexandria after the events of the bridge rebuilding.
- Chloe Garcia-Frizzi and Cailey Fleming as Judith Grimes, the daughter of Lori Grimes and Shane Walsh and adopted daughter of Rick and Michonne.
- Anabelle Holloway as Gracie, the daughter of a Savior who was killed by Rick during a fight; she is adopted by Aaron.
- Elyse Dufour as Frankie, one of Negan's former "wives" and current resident of Alexandria.
- Antony Azor as Rick "R.J." Grimes Jr., the son of Rick and Michonne.

==== The Hilltop ====
- Brett Butler as Tammy Rose Sutton, a resident of the Hilltop and wife to Earl.
- John Finn as Earl Sutton, the Hilltop's blacksmith and husband to Tammy.
- AJ Achinger as Kenneth "Ken" Sutton, a resident of the Hilltop, son of Earl and Tammy.
- Karen Ceesay as Bertie, a resident of the Hilltop who later becomes the teacher at the community.
- James Chen as Kal, a protector and guardian of the Hilltop.
- Anthony Lopez as Oscar, a resident of the Hilltop.
- Gustavo Gomez as Marco, a supply runner of the Hilltop.
- C. Thomas Howell as Roy, a resident of the Hilltop.
- Kelley Mack as Adeline, a resident of the Hilltop who has feelings for Henry.
- Jackson Pace as Gage, a resident of the Hilltop and Henry's friend.
- Joe Ando-Hirsh as Rodney, a resident of the Hilltop and Gage's friend.

==== The Sanctuary ====
- Traci Dinwiddie as Regina, a former lieutenant of the Saviors, and member of a group of rebel Saviors.
- Jon Eyez as Potter, a former worker for the Saviors who supports Rick's decision to imprison Negan.
- Elizabeth Ludlow as Arat, a former lieutenant of the Saviors who has made peace with Rick's group.
- Aaron Farb as Norris, a member of the Saviors and D.J.'s friend who allies himself with Jed.
- Chloe Aktas as Tanya, a resident of the Sanctuary and one of Negan's former "wives".
- Zach McGowan as Justin, a hostile Savior not interested in working together with the other communities and loyal to the order of Negan's leadership.
- Rhys Coiro as Jed, a rebellious member of the Saviors who also wants to go back to Negan's ideology and the main antagonist of the first half of the season.

==== The Kingdom ====
- Cooper Andrews as Jerry, a resident of the Kingdom and Ezekiel's right-hand man who is in a relationship with Nabila.
- Kerry Cahill as Dianne, one of Ezekiel's top soldiers and a skilled archer.
- Matt Lintz as Henry, a resident of the Kingdom and the younger brother of the deceased Benjamin. He is also adopted son of Carol and Ezekiel.
  - Macsen Lintz as young Henry
- Nadine Marissa as Nabila, a resident and gardener of the Kingdom and Jerry's wife.

==== Oceanside ====
- Sydney Park as Cyndie, a young woman who has become the leader of the Oceanside community following the death of her grandmother, Natania.
- Briana Venskus as Beatrice, one of Oceanside's top soldiers and Cyndie's right-hand, who resents the Saviors.
- Nicole Barré as Kathy, one of Oceanside's top soldiers.
- Avianna Mynhier as Rachel Ward, an aggressive young member of Oceanside.
  - Mimi Kirkland as young Rachel Ward

==== Magna's group ====
- Nadia Hilker as Magna, the feisty leader of a small group of roaming survivors.
- Eleanor Matsuura as Yumiko, Magna's girlfriend.
- Dan Fogler as Luke, a former music teacher who has come to appreciate safety in numbers.
- Lauren Ridloff as Connie, a deaf member of Magna's group.
- Angel Theory as Kelly, Connie's protective sister and a member of Magna's group.

==== The Whisperers ====
- Cassady McClincy as Lydia, Alpha's daughter and Henry's love interest.
  - Scarlett Blum as young Lydia
- Ryan Hurst as Beta, the second-in-command of the Whisperers.

==== The Highwaymen ====
- Angus Sampson as Ozzy, the leader of the Highwaymen, a group of raiders occupying the Kingdom's surrounding areas following the fall of the Sanctuary.
- Jason Kirkpatrick as Alek, Ozzy's right-hand man.

==== Miscellaneous ====
- Jon Bernthal as Shane Walsh, Rick's best friend and fellow police officer, who was previously killed by Rick in the second season, appears in one of Rick's hallucinations.
- Sonequa Martin-Green as Sasha Williams, a former survivor of Rick's group, who sacrificed herself to help Rick and his survivors against Negan during the seventh season, appears in one of Rick's hallucinations.
- Scott Wilson as Hershel Greene, Maggie's father, who was previously killed by The Governor in the fourth season, appears in one of Rick's hallucinations.
- Rutina Wesley as Jocelyn, an old friend of Michonne and the leader of a group of orphaned children.
- Steve Kazee as Frank, Lydia's father and Alpha's husband, appears in Lydia's flashback.

== Episodes ==
No. overall	No. in season	Title	Directed by	Written by	Original release date	U.S. viewers (millions)
116	1	"A New Beginning"	Greg Nicotero	Angela Kang	October 7, 2018	6.08
Eighteen months after Negan's defeat, the communities are working on rebuilding society. The Sanctuary suffers from infertile ground and underlying support for Negan. Rick leads a trek to a Washington, D.C. museum to recover pioneering supplies; on the way back, they find the main bridge to Hilltop has been broken by a storm, forcing them to detour. A young man, Ken, is killed while protecting the group's horses from walkers. Gregory, ousted as Hilltop's leader, convinces Ken's father, Earl, to try to assassinate Maggie but he fails. Rick and Michonne ask Maggie for Hilltop's help in providing for the Sanctuary but she refuses. That evening, Maggie has Gregory publicly executed for his actions.
117	2	"The Bridge"	Daisy von Scherler Mayer	David Leslie Johnson-McGoldrick	October 14, 2018	4.95
A month after Gregory's death, the communities work together to repair the bridge; several Saviors have gone missing since construction began. After some persuasion, Maggie decides to deliver food to a starving Sanctuary. A herd approaches the repair crew after Justin fails to sound an alarm and Aaron's arm is crushed under a log. Daryl rescues Aaron and Enid is forced to amputate Aaron's arm to keep him alive. Anne and Gabriel pursue a romantic relationship but Anne takes note of a nearby helicopter. Rick updates an incarcerated Negan on the bridge's progress, and Negan warns him that his vision will fail. Justin is banished and on his way back to the Sanctuary, he is abducted.
118	3	"Warning Signs"	Dan Liu	Corey Reed	October 21, 2018	5.04
After Justin is discovered dead, Arat goes missing as well, angering the Saviors and postponing the construction on the bridge. Rick asks Gabriel to follow Anne, who is revealed to have been trading people to a mysterious ally in exchange for supplies. Gabriel confronts her, forcing her to incapacitate him. Daryl and Maggie learn that Oceanside has been capturing and killing the Saviors, including Arat, as revenge for killing Oceanside's men. They walk away as Cyndie kills Arat and they decide to ignore "Rick's way" and confront Negan.
119	4	"The Obliged"	Rosemary Rodriguez	Geraldine Inoa	October 28, 2018	5.10
Jesus tells Rick about Maggie's intention to assassinate Negan, and Rick tries to delay her entry into Alexandria. Anne plans to send Gabriel away to her mysterious ally but changes her mind and abandons him instead. The Saviors steal guns and confront Carol over Oceanside's actions; a riot ensues and the gunfire leads a walker herd to the work camp. Rick takes a horse to lead the herd away from the camp but the horse gets spooked and throws him off onto a concrete slab, impaling his torso with rebar and knocking him unconscious.
120	5	"What Comes After"	Greg Nicotero	Story by : Scott M. Gimple & Matthew Negrete; Teleplay by : Matthew Negrete	November 4, 2018	5.41
Critically wounded and weak, Rick attempts to draw the herd away on horseback. Maggie goes to execute Negan, but after realizing that he is worse than dead already, she abandons the attempt. Rick leads the walkers onto the bridge and apparently sacrifices himself by blowing it up, stopping the herd. Unknown to everyone, Rick is found alive and rescued by Anne, who contacts her allies in the helicopter. They gather the duo and fly to parts unknown. Six years later, Judith rescues a new group of survivors from walkers.
121	6	"Who Are You Now?"	Larry Teng	Eddie Guzelian	November 11, 2018	5.40
After much resistance, Judith convinces Michonne to help Magna's group by escorting them to Hilltop. While setting up radio transmitting equipment, Rosita and Eugene are followed by a strangely-acting herd of walkers. Carol takes the teenage Henry to Hilltop to apprentice as a blacksmith; they are ambushed by Jed, Regina and several former Saviors who steal their supplies. Carol later burns the group alive and takes Henry to visit Daryl, who is living alone in the wilderness. Negan remains a prisoner in Alexandria but has apparently adopted a less antagonistic attitude.
122	7	"Stradivarius"	Michael Cudlitz	Vivian Tse	November 18, 2018	4.79
Michonne leads Magna's group towards the Hilltop but refuses to travel all the way, fearing a confrontation with Maggie. She learns from Siddiq that Maggie recently left the Hilltop to help Georgie build another community, leaving Jesus and Tara in charge. Michonne brings Magna's group to their former camp, allowing Luke to recover some of the musical instruments he had been scavenging. While Jesus and Aaron are discussing how to bring Hilltop and Alexandria closer together, they see a flare shot by an injured Rosita, who informs them of Eugene's whereabouts. Daryl escorts Carol and Henry to Hilltop for Henry to apprentice as a blacksmith. Later, Jesus, Aaron and Daryl leave to search for Eugene.
123	8	"Evolution"	Michael E. Satrazemis	David Leslie Johnson-McGoldrick	November 25, 2018	5.09
After Gabriel accidentally leaves his cell unlocked, Negan escapes from confinement. Henry begins his apprenticeship with Earl but sneaks outside Hilltop and gets drunk, leading to his being temporarily imprisoned. Magna's group is accepted into Hilltop but are told by Tara that they must "earn their keep". Daryl, Jesus and Aaron find Eugene, who reveals that he heard walkers whispering to each other, suggesting that they are evolving. The whispering herd pursues the group and corners them in a cemetery. Michonne, Magna and Yumiko arrive to help but Jesus is killed after a "walker" stabs him through the chest. After fending off the herd, the group discovers that the whispering walkers are indeed people wearing walker skins. The Whisperers suddenly surround the group.
124	9	"Adaptation"	Greg Nicotero	Corey Reed	February 10, 2019	5.16
Michonne's group manages to escape the cemetery and they capture a young Whisperer, Lydia, on their way back to Hilltop. Michonne and Daryl attempt to get answers from the girl without much luck, though she admits that her mother is still alive and that her people live among the walkers. Rosita tells Siddiq that she is pregnant with his baby. Tara agrees to let Magna's group stay at Hilltop, while Michonne plans to return to Alexandria to warn her people of the new threat. After escaping Alexandria, Negan returns to the Sanctuary only to find it abandoned, and he thus returns to the comfort of his cell in Alexandria willingly. Luke and Alden are lured into a trap and captured by the Whisperers.
125	10	"Omega"	David Boyd	Channing Powell	February 17, 2019	4.54
As Henry and Lydia grow closer, she reveals events of her past following the onset of the outbreak. Henry is released from his cell by Daryl when he feels the boy is revealing too much to Lydia. After aggressively interrogating Lydia, Daryl takes a softer approach with her after realizing she is the victim of abuse at the hands of her mother. Despite the risks, Magna's group searches for Luke against Tara's orders; they abandon the search after realizing it is no longer safe. The next day, a group of Whisperers arrive at the Hilltop led by Lydia's mother, Alpha, who demands her daughter be returned.
126	11	"Bounty"	Meera Menon	Matthew Negrete	February 24, 2019	4.39
In a flashback, Tara and Jesus give Ezekiel the community charter. In the present, Alpha successfully negotiates with Daryl for an exchange of hostages: Alden and Luke for Lydia. Daryl watches with indignation at how Alpha treats her daughter. Ezekiel, Carol, Jerry, and others enter a movie theater in order to obtain a film projector bulb for a cinema they want to set up for the community fair. Later, Henry leaves the Hilltop, suggesting he is going out to look for Lydia; Daryl sets off with Connie in pursuit.
127	12	"Guardians"	Michael E. Satrazemis	LaToya Morgan	March 3, 2019	4.71
Henry manages to find Lydia but is captured by Beta, Alpha's right-hand Whisperer. In Alexandria, Michonne discusses with the council the possible union of the communities at the fair. Michonne talks with Negan about his escape; he tries to convince her he has changed, but she distrusts him, something that puts her at odds with Judith. Alpha and Beta try to convince Lydia to kill Henry, but she does not want to do so. Daryl and Connie appear, disguised as Whisperers, and they escape with Henry and Lydia.
128	13	"Chokepoint"	Liesl Tommy	Eddie Guzelian & David Leslie Johnson-McGoldrick	March 10, 2019	4.83
Daryl, Connie, Henry, and Lydia take shelter in a building from Beta's pursuit, using the structure to lay ambush to the Whisperers; Daryl pushes Beta down an elevator shaft, though the fall does not kill him. After entering their territory to retrieve the projector bulb, The Kingdom encounters a group called the Highwaymen that have stolen their gear; Ezekiel and Carol negotiate with the group to help patrol the roads prior to the Kingdom's fair. As the Hilltop group arrives at the Kingdom for the fair with the Highwaymen escort, Daryl vows to bring Lydia, Henry, and Connie away from Hilltop to hide from Alpha.
129	14	"Scars"	Millicent Shelton	Corey Reed & Vivian Tse	March 17, 2019	4.57
In a flashback, an old friend of Michonne, Jocelyn, is rescued by Alexandria, along with several children she watches over. The next morning, they find Jocelyn and her group gone, along with the children of Alexandria. Michonne and Daryl track them down, but are lured into a trap; Michonne is forced to kill Jocelyn and her children, and once back at Alexandria, declares that the community will no longer take in strangers. In the present, Daryl's group seeks a short respite at Alexandria before continuing on to Kingdom. Judith reveals she remembers what happened with Jocelyn, and that she does not understand why Michonne does not want to help her friends. Michonne finally has a change of heart, and sets off with Judith to give Daryl's group an escort to Kingdom. Later, the Whisperers discover the Kingdom.
130	15	"The Calm Before"	Laura Belsey	Geraldine Inoa & Channing Powell	March 24, 2019	4.15
The communities gather at the Kingdom for the trade fair; together, the leaders sign the charter and vow to band together against the Whisperers. Alpha infiltrates the fair disguised as a murdered Hilltop resident; after an encounter with Lydia, she disowns her daughter. Alpha later shows Daryl a massive horde of walkers that she threatens to unleash upon the communities if they cross into Whisperer territory again. At the border, the severed heads of Ozzy, Alek, DJ, Frankie, Tammy-Rose, Rodney, Addy, Enid, Tara, and Henry are found. As Daryl and Lydia visit the border, snow begins to fall.
131	16	"The Storm"	Greg Nicotero	Angela Kang & Matthew Negrete	March 31, 2019	5.02
Sometime after their devastating loss, the Kingdom finally falls and has to be abandoned in favor of the Hilltop. The communities come together to help perform the move as a massive and dangerous blizzard hits which forces the Kingdommers to trek through Whisperer territory despite the danger. Everyone makes it safely, but Carol and Ezekiel, having fallen apart since Henry's death, divorce and Carol moves back to Alexandria with Daryl and Lydia. At Alexandria, the residents struggle to survive the blizzard. After Judith runs off to rescue Daryl's dog, Negan risks his own life to save her, injuring his leg in the process. He earns the respect of Michonne due to this. Unbeknownst to anyone, a woman calls out over the radio and questions if anyone's out there.

== Production ==
The series was renewed for a ninth season in January 2018. Along with the renewal, it was announced that showrunner Scott M. Gimple would be promoted to chief content officer for both The Walking Dead and its spin-off show Fear the Walking Dead, while writer and co-executive producer Angela Kang would take Gimple's role for The Walking Dead.

Filming for the ninth season began on April 30, 2018, with Greg Nicotero directing the first episode of the season. Michael Cudlitz, who played Abraham Ford, directed the seventh episode of the season.

The ninth season features a redesigned opening credits sequence. The animated title sequence, which is graphic novel inspired, features familiar imagery such as Daryl's motorcycle and crossbow, and Michonne's katana. Kang spoke of the inspiration for the new sequence, "The feel of the season has elements of the Western genre. We're paying homage to some of the iconic moments from the graphic novel. Life is coming out of death. Nature's taking over, while other things are crumbling."

=== Casting ===
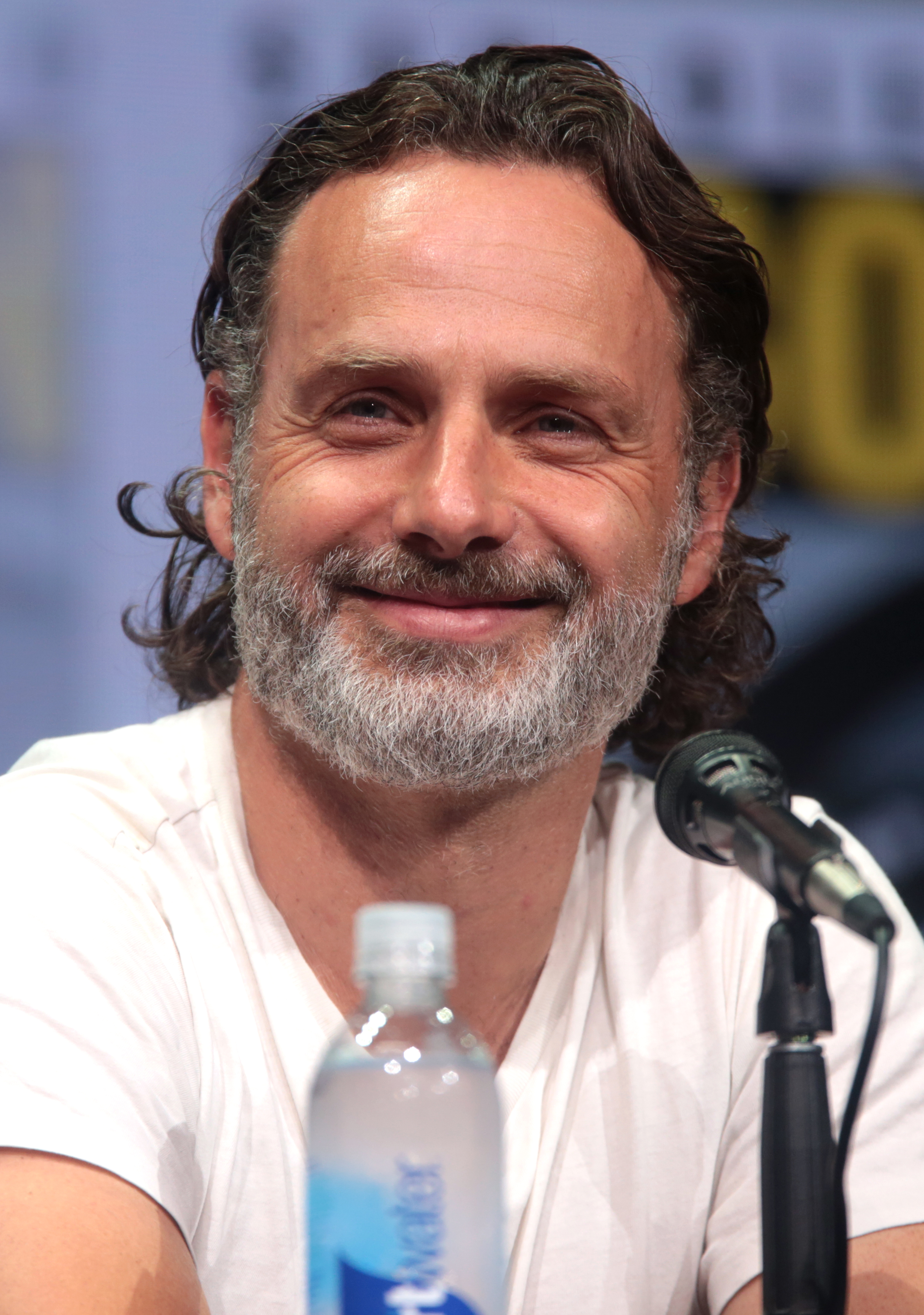
The ninth season is the final season of series lead Andrew Lincoln

Most of the cast's contracts had to be renewed for the ninth season and beyond; most of the cast re-signed; the notable exception was Lauren Cohan who plays Maggie Greene. Cohan had sought a pay increase from AMC given her high demand from other networks; while she had signed on to star in a new series, Whiskey Cavalier, for the ABC network, this contract would enable her to participate on The Walking Dead in a limited role. In April, Cohan confirmed she signed on for the ninth season and appeared in the first five episodes.

At the end of the eighth season, former regular Lennie James (as Morgan Jones) was moved to The Walking Dead's companion series, Fear the Walking Dead, as showrunner Scott M. Gimple felt there were more stories about Morgan to tell that would be more effective with Fear the Walking Dead's smaller cast and narrative approach. In May 2018, it was announced that Avi Nash and Callan McAuliffe, who joined the series in the eighth season as the recurring roles of Siddiq and Alden, respectively, were promoted to series regulars.

In late May, it was reported that the ninth season would be the final season for Andrew Lincoln, who plays lead character Rick Grimes. Lincoln said that as he lives in England and shooting a season takes six months or more, he believed it was time to leave the series to be able to spend more time with his children. He expressed desire to direct an episode in season ten and shadowed director Michael E. Satrazemis during the ninth-season episode "Guardians". In July 2019, it was confirmed Lincoln would not direct in season ten due to scheduling conflicts. Following the broadcast of Lincoln's last episode, AMC announced their plans to create three AMC Original Films to explore events related to Rick's character in the future, starring Lincoln and with the first expected to begin production in 2019. Besides Lincoln, Pollyanna McIntosh (Jadis/Anne) will also star in these films.

Lauren Cohan also announced that this would be her last season on the series, appearing in the first five episodes as Maggie Greene before her departure. Alongside other acting commitments, Cohan felt she had become too comfortable in the role and it was time to move on. She appreciated the opportunity to explore Maggie in her last few episodes, and has not ruled out returning for future seasons based on her future commitments. In October 2019, it was confirmed that Cohan would return in season 11 as a series regular.

In June 2018, it was reported that Jon Bernthal would reprise his role as Shane Walsh for a guest appearance in the ninth season. In July 2018, it was reported that Lauren Ridloff, a deaf actress, would join the series in the ninth season playing Connie, a deaf survivor who communicates through sign language. Also in July 2018, during San Diego Comic-Con, it was announced that Samantha Morton was cast in the series regular role of Alpha, the leader of the Whisperers, a villain from the comic book series. Several other recurring roles were announced as well, played by Brett Butler, John Finn, Rhys Coiro, Dan Fogler and Zach McGowan.

On October 6, 2018, the day before the season premiere, the showrunners affirmed Bernthal's return as Shane, as well as Sonequa Martin-Green and Scott Wilson returning to reprise their roles as Sasha Williams and Hershel Greene, respectively, at the New York Comic Con. Wilson died later that day due to leukemia; according to Comicbook.com, Wilson had filmed his scenes previously to be broadcast during the first half of the season.

The ninth season also features the departures of series regulars Xander Berkeley (Gregory), Tom Payne (Paul "Jesus" Rovia), Katelyn Nacon (Enid) and Alanna Masterson (Tara Chambler). Berkeley's character is killed off in the first episode of the season, which was adapted from the comic book. Payne's character is killed off in the mid-season finale, which introduces the Whisperers. This was a major departure from the original comic, where Jesus is still alive and the actor explained, "It's an amazing show and I was so honored to be a part of it, but at the same time, being the same character without anything fun to do is a bit frustrating". Nacon's and Masterson's characters are killed in the penultimate episode of the season; their deaths were adapted from the comic book in which Rosita Espinosa and Ezekiel are among several killed by the Whisperers.

=== Writing ===
Promotional poster for the second half of the season, featuring Samantha Morton as Alpha

Angela Kang stated that the season would include a timeskip, which coincides with the comic's narrative after the "All Out War" arc. She stated that they were aiming to give the series a "fresh look and feel", and "focusing a lot on the core character relationships in the show that have kind of been long-lasting, as well as all of our wonderful series regulars". Kang said that the season would "explore what happened as man made objects and structures break down" and "what happens as resources are getting low", giving the season a Western feel. Actor Tom Payne, who portrays Paul "Jesus" Rovia, said the timejump is about a year and a half from the end of the eighth season, giving enough time for survivors to re-establish farming and livestock raising.

A second timeskip occurs towards the end of episode 5, after a helicopter whisks a wounded Rick to safety. The next scene takes place six years later, when a now much older Judith saves a group of survivors from a ring of walkers.

=== Design ===
This season introduces the Whisperers, a group of human survivors that have created skins and masks out of walkers that allows them to move among and manipulate walker hordes. For these masks, director Greg Nicotero wanted to change the appearance from the way they are shown in the comic, which gave the masks a type of melting look. Nicotero also did not want to give these masks a look similar to Leatherface's from The Texas Chain Saw Massacre. Instead, they opted to make the Whisperers masks immovable similar to Michael Myers' from the Halloween series, which according to Nicotero, "you cannot judge any kind of emotion".

== Release ==
The teaser for the season was released on July 19, 2018, the first day of the 2018 San Diego Comic-Con. The trailer was released on July 20, 2018. The ninth season premiered on October 7, 2018, and the episode was made available a day early via AMC Premiere, the network's on-demand service. The mid-season premiere was made available a week earlier, on February 3, 2019, via AMC Premiere.

== Reception ==
=== Critical response ===
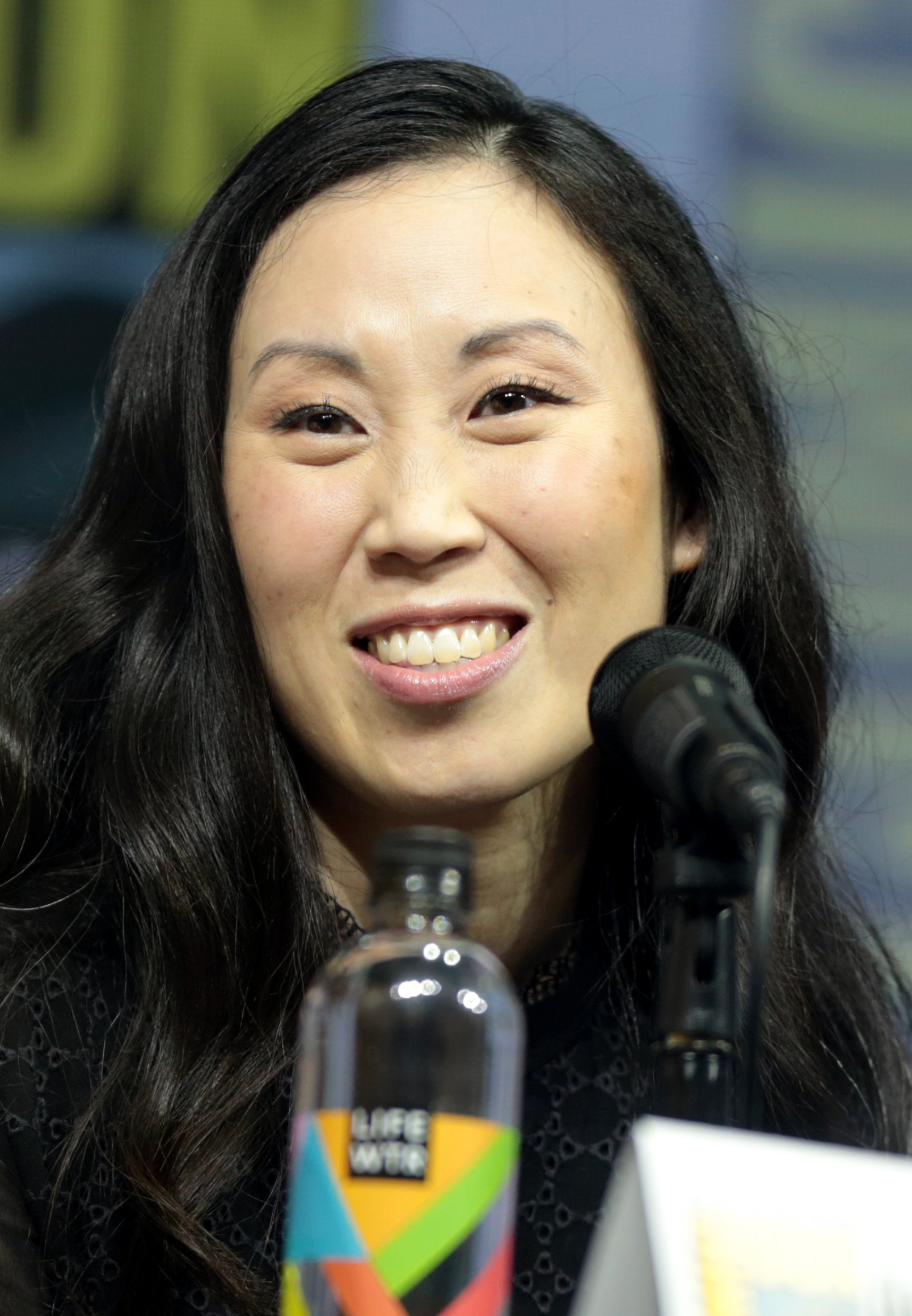
The ninth season received positive reviews, particularly credited to new showrunner Angela Kang

The ninth season of The Walking Dead was met with a positive reception, with critics noting its improvement over the two previous seasons. On Rotten Tomatoes, the season holds a score of 89% with an average rating of 7.15 out of 10, based on 365 reviews. The site's critical consensus reads, "Nine seasons in, The Walking Dead feels more alive than ever, with heightened tension and a refreshed pace that rejuvenates this long-running franchise." On Metacritic, the season has a score of 72 out of 100 based on 4 critics, indicating "generally favorable" reviews. Reviewing the season premiere, Sarah Moran of Screen Rant wrote the episode "feels like the fresh start the series so desperately needs, trading grim wartime for a more peaceful period of growth and reflection" and praised the changes made by new showrunner Angela Kang. Erik Kain of Forbes called the first episode "the best episode since season 6 and better than many in that season as well."

Brandon Davis of Comicbook.com wrote a highly positive review based on the first three episodes, praising the more character-driven narrative. In another review from Comicbook.com, Cameron Bonomolo also praised the first three episodes of the season, writing, "The Walking Dead is now a political drama viewed through the lens of a zombie apocalypse, turning greater focus to more complex character-driven conflict that is at its strongest since the Frank Darabont-led first season." Bonomolo also called the third episode "jaw-dropping" and that it "delivers some of the finest mystery and drama the show has ever seen in its eight-year run." Jeff Stone of IndieWire wrote a positive review based on the first three episodes and gave them an "A−" grade. He called the ninth season a "huge step up for the show" and that the episodes "are as strong as anything the show's done since the heyday of Season 4."

The penultimate episode "The Calm Before" received critical acclaim from critics. In the episode, several characters are killed off; including main characters Enid and Tara Chambler. Alex McLevy writing for The A.V. Club praised the episode, with a qualification of A− and in his review he said: "At best, 'The Calm Before' could be a memorial for what this show has been as it heads toward a new future, a reminder of what it used to look like during its strongest seasons, before reshuffling the undead chessboard of its major players and changing up the nature of its structure and stories. "Warning Signs" showed this was possible, and the Whisperers are an ideal foil by which to engage in some ambitious new ways of dealing with these characters and communities as they enter a new era of existence. True, this show hasn't demonstrated anything like the kind of consistency that would point to such a maneuver; continuing its uneven mix of soap-opera melodrama and intriguing experiments in post-apocalyptic thrills is the likely progression. But as we close the book on season nine and look to the show's 10th(!) year, this was an excellent reminder of what got us all tuning in in the first place."

The Walking Dead season 9: Critical reception by episode
Season 9 (2018–19): Percentage of positive critics' reviews tracked by the website Rotten Tomatoes

=== Ratings ===
Viewership and ratings per episode of The Walking Dead season 9
No.	Title	Air date	Rating (18–49)	Viewers (millions)	DVR (18–49)	DVR viewers (millions)	Total (18–49)	Total viewers (millions)
1	"A New Beginning"	October 7, 2018	2.5	6.08	1.5	3.26	4.0	9.36
2	"The Bridge"	October 14, 2018	2.0	4.95	1.5	3.42	3.5	8.38
3	"Warning Signs"	October 21, 2018	1.9	5.04	1.1	2.39	3.0	7.44 (Note: Live +7 ratings were not available, so Live +3 ratings have been used instead.)
4	"The Obliged"	October 28, 2018	2.0	5.10	1.1	2.42	3.0	7.51
5	"What Comes After"	November 4, 2018	2.1	5.41	1.2	2.63	3.2	8.04
6	"Who Are You Now?"	November 11, 2018	2.0	5.40	1.2	2.62	3.2	8.02
7	"Stradivarius"	November 18, 2018	1.8	4.79	1.1	2.44	2.9	7.24
8	"Evolution"	November 25, 2018	2.0	5.09	1.3	2.79	3.3	7.88
9	"Adaptation"	February 10, 2019	2.0	5.16	0.8	1.95	2.8	7.11
10	"Omega"	February 17, 2019	1.7	4.54	1.2	2.81	2.9	7.36
11	"Bounty"	February 24, 2019	1.7	4.39	1.2	2.84	2.9	7.24
12	"Guardians"	March 3, 2019	1.7	4.71	1.2	2.89	2.9	7.61
13	"Chokepoint"	March 10, 2019	1.8	4.83	1.0	2.51	2.8	7.35
14	"Scars"	March 17, 2019	1.7	4.57	1.2	2.91	2.9	7.49
15	"The Calm Before"	March 24, 2019	1.5	4.15	1.0	2.59	2.5	6.75
16	"The Storm"	March 31, 2019	1.9	5.02	1.0	2.44	2.9	7.47
