= A New Beginning (The Walking Dead) =

- The Walking Dead episode
- Episode no.: Season 9 Episode 1
- Directed by: Greg Nicotero
- Written by: Angela Kang
- Cinematography by: Duane Manwiller
- Editing by: Alan Cody
- Original air date: October 7, 2018
- Running time: 59 minutes

Guest appearances
- Cooper Andrews as Jerry; Brett Butler as Tammy Rose; John Finn as Earl; Sydney Park as Cyndie; Elizabeth Ludlow as Arat; Zach McGowan as Justin; Lindsley Register as Laura; Traci Dinwiddie as Regina; Jon Eyez as Potter

Episode chronology
← Previous "Wrath"	Next → "The Bridge"
- The Walking Dead season 9

"A New Beginning" is the ninth season premiere episode of the post-apocalyptic horror television series The Walking Dead, which aired on AMC on October 7, 2018. The episode was written by showrunner Angela Kang and directed by executive producer Greg Nicotero.

This episode marks the final appearance of Xander Berkeley (Gregory), who first appeared in the sixth season episode "Knots Untie". The episode was dedicated to Scott Wilson, the actor who played Hershel Greene during seasons two through four; he died the day before the episode's broadcast.

== Plot ==
Eighteen months have passed since Negan's defeat at the hands of the Militia. The communities of Alexandria, the Hilltop, the Kingdom, Oceanside, and the Sanctuary have rebuilt what they can to make more viable societies. Rick and Michonne are raising Judith and overseeing Alexandria. Daryl and Eugene oversee the remaining Saviors at the Sanctuary, where infertile ground makes it difficult to grow anything. Maggie has given birth to her and Glenn's child, which she named for her father Hershel. She has defeated Gregory in an election to be leader of the Hilltop, but is still distressed about Rick's decision to keep Negan alive. Carol and Ezekiel at the Kingdom have grown as a couple.

Rick leads a group up into the remains of Washington, D.C. to salvage pioneering supplies, such as plows, canoes, seed samples, and a covered wagon from a museum. This is made difficult by the need to cross over a floor made of weakened glass, under which a horde of walkers have amassed. Ezekiel falls through on the last crossing, but they have tied themselves together with ropes to catch each other, and Carol and others quickly rescue him. They head back to the communities with their haul.

They find a recent rainstorm has raised water levels in a river and destroyed one of the bridges on the way to the Hilltop. While Rick suggests they can get to Alexandria and wait out the water levels, Maggie wants to get back to her child at the Hilltop, and lets Rick's group take the supplies to Alexandria. Rick's group continues on but the wagon gets stuck in a muddy part of the road. As walkers bear down on them, they decide to abandon the supplies and come back for them later. Ken goes back to cut loose the horses, but ends up bitten by a walker. Despite them amputating his arm and immediate medical care, he still dies. Some time later, Maggie talks to Tammy and Earl Rose, Ken's parents, who are angry their son died for nothing of value since the supplies will ultimately go to the Saviors at the Sanctuary. They hold a funeral for Ken overseen by Gregory.

Rick, Daryl, and Michonne bring the recovered supplies to the Sanctuary. Daryl sees graffiti on the walls still proclaiming loyalty to Negan. Daryl talks with Rick about no longer wanting to be the one in charge of the Sanctuary, and prefers the old way of being in smaller groups with people he can trust. Carol talks to Daryl alone, and offers to take over the Sanctuary for him, as she is somewhat concerned that Ezekiel has indicated he wants to marry her. Michonne, after seeing Negan's name at the wall at the Sanctuary and inspired by a display at the museum, suggests to Rick that they establish a charter between the communities to act as a new code of laws.

At the Hilltop, Gregory talks to Earl over a shot of whiskey, suggesting that the election was illegitimate and that others, like himself, are angry. Gregory then finds Maggie walking outside with Hershel and he tells her someone has defaced Glenn's grave. She goes there but is assaulted by a hooded man. Enid and others come to her rescue, revealing the man to be Earl. Maggie accosts Gregory, who does not deny his act, and taunts her that she will refuse to run off to Alexandria for help because Negan is being held prisoner there. Gregory attempts to kill Maggie but she overpowers him. The next day, Rick and Michonne come to visit the Hilltop, and Rick tries to get Maggie to agree to give supplies to the Sanctuary and help with repairing the bridge. She asserts that she will only provide supplies if the Sanctuary supply most of the workforce for the work on the bridge. Maggie tells Rick that she's no longer following his way. Before they leave, Maggie has Gregory hanged while Rick and Michonne look on in horror.

== Production ==
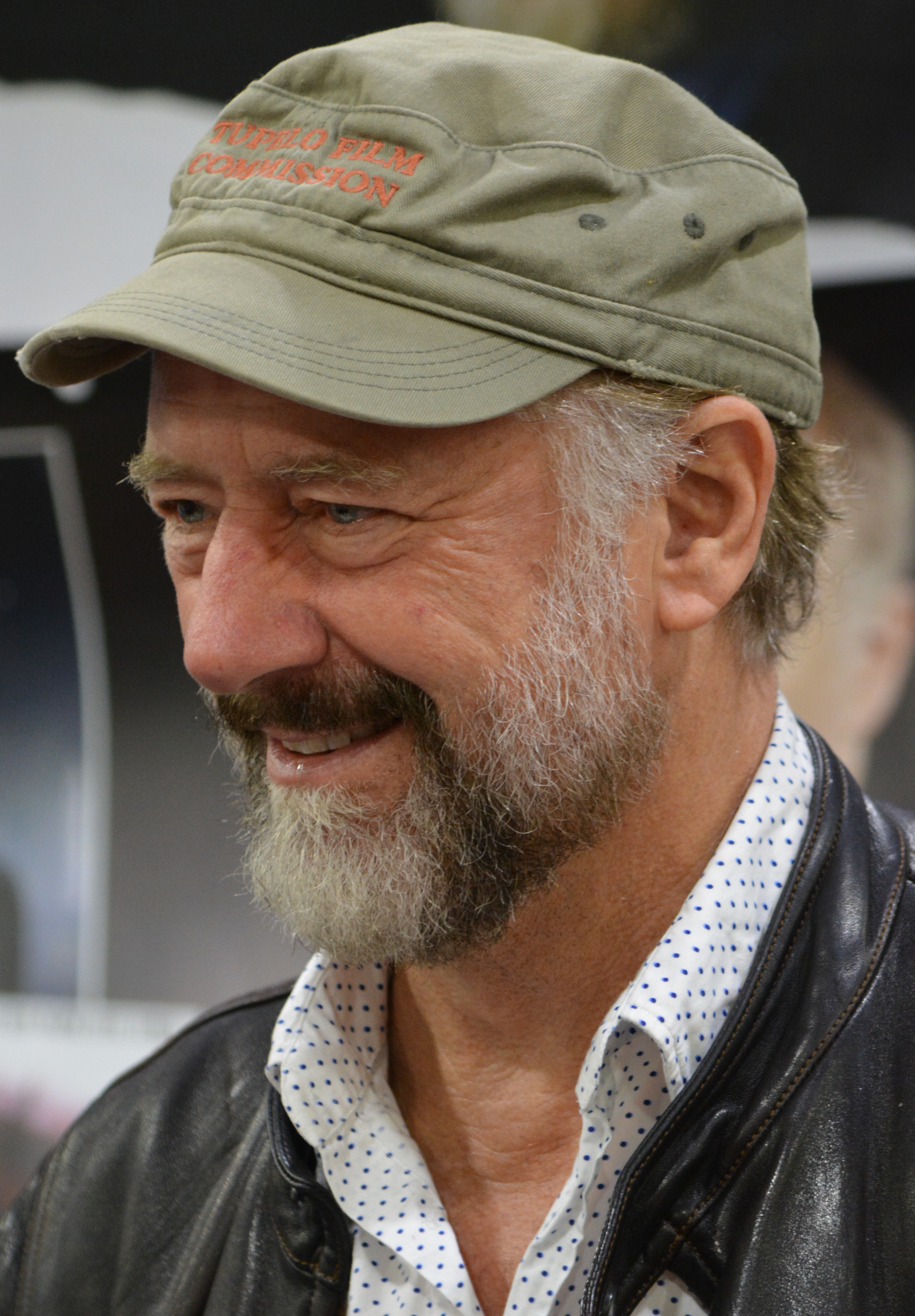
Xander Berkeley made his final regular appearance as Gregory in this episode.

"A New Beginning" represents the first episode of several changes to the series. It is the first episode with Angela Kang as the showrunner, taking over for Scott M. Gimple who was transitioning to his role as overseer of The Walking Dead franchise for AMC. It also represents the last season for Andrew Lincoln as Rick Grimes, who had announced his departure from the show earlier in 2018. To facilitate this, several elements of "A New Beginning" are designed to accommodate Lincoln's departure.

According to Kang, they continued the hostility between Rick and Maggie over differences of how Rick saved Negan's life, and expanding that to some of Rick's other closer allies. Thus, the washed-out bridge that must be fixed and serves as a plot element for several more episodes was envisioned as a literal representation of the bridge that Rick needs to make to his friends and allies to keep the various communities working together, according to Kang.

The episode includes the death of main character Gregory, played by Xander Berkeley. Prior to season nine, Berkeley said that there had been some long-term plan for Gregory's death, stating that "There's only so long a douchebag like Gregory can stay alive." With season nine's change in showrunner alongside the changes necessary to accommodate the departure of Lincoln and the limited schedule of Lauren Cohan, Berkeley learned his character's death had been pushed up much sooner, which he learned nearly last minute. Berkeley had no qualms about the change, and considered that being hanged would add to his actor's portfolio of deaths from previous works. Gregory's death was adapted from the comic book in issue #141, where Gregory similarly plotted for Maggie's death due to being ousted as the Hilltop's leader, and Maggie opted to hang him as punishment.

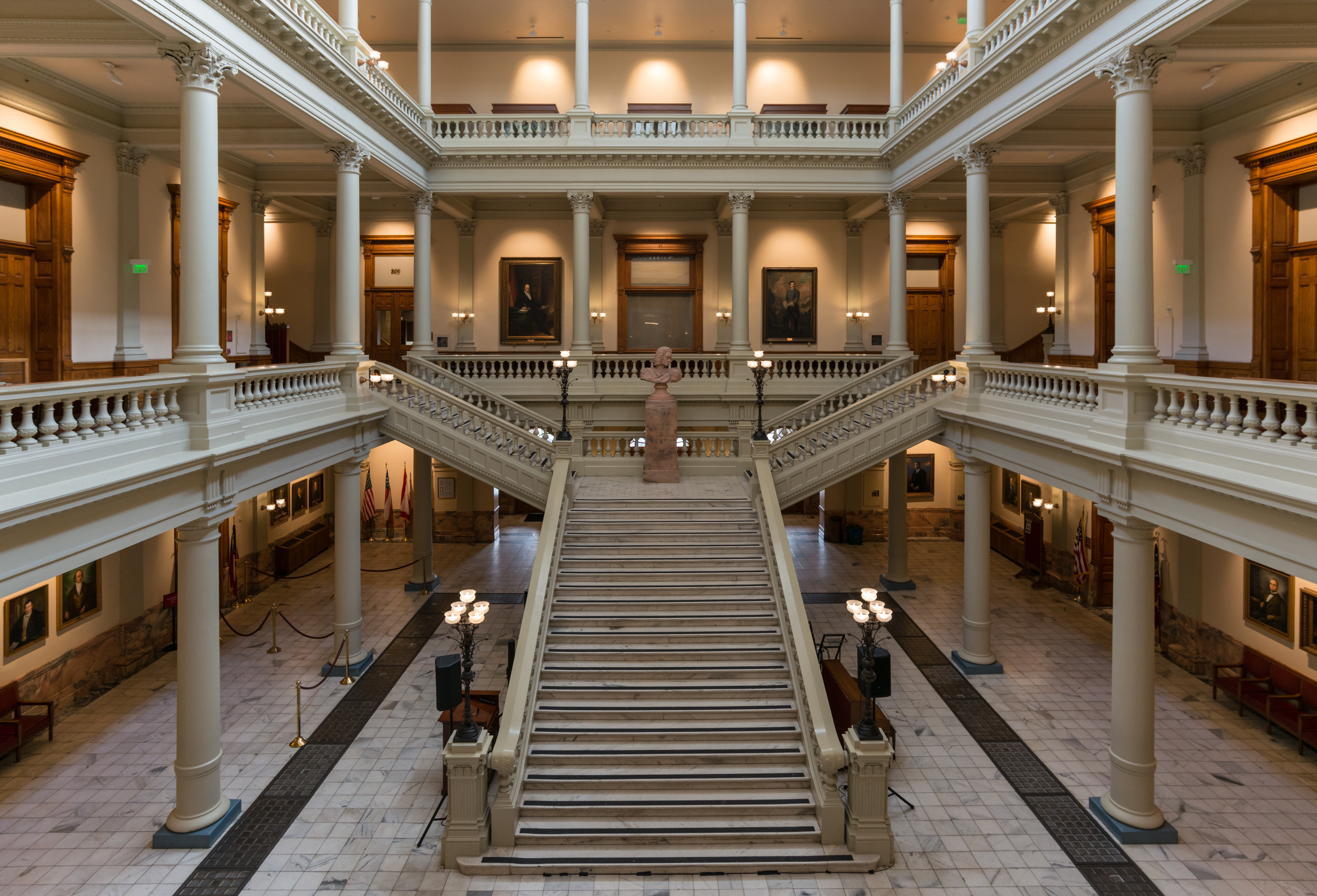
The grand staircase of the Georgia State Capitol, where some of the scenes for this episode were shot.

Filming of the museum scenes primarily took place at the Georgia State Capitol in Atlanta across two days. The production team created a fake glass floor made of plexiglass to use at the base of the building's staircase for some of the scenes.

The episode was dedicated to memory of Scott Wilson, the actor for Hershel Greene on the series. Wilson died on October 6, 2018, shortly after news earlier that day that he had already reprised his role of Hershel for season nine.

== Reception ==
=== Critical reception ===
"A New Beginning" received critical acclaim from critics. On Rotten Tomatoes, the episode has an approval rating of 97% with an average score of 7.23 out of 10, based on 29 reviews. The critical consensus reads: "By returning to its roots, 'A New Beginning' pumps fresh blood into TWD and inspires hope for a brighter future."

=== Ratings ===
The episode received a total viewership of 6.08 million with a 2.5 rating in adults aged 18–49. Although it was the highest-rated cable program of the night, it was the lowest-rated season premiere for the series and was down 50% from the season 8 premiere.
