= The Obliged =

- The Walking Dead episode
- Episode no.: Season 9 Episode 4
- Directed by: Rosemary Rodriguez
- Written by: Geraldine Inoa
- Cinematography by: Stephen Campbell
- Editing by: Alan Cody
- Original air date: October 28, 2018
- Running time: 45 minutes

Guest appearances
- Cooper Andrews as Jerry; Rhys Coiro as Jed; Kerry Cahill as Dianne; Nicole Barré as Kathy; Traci Dinwiddie as Regina; Briana Venskus as Beatrice; Matt Mangum as DJ; Aaron Farb as Norris; Mimi Kirkland as Rachel; Mandi Christine Kerr as Barbara; Jennifer Riker as Mrs. Robinson

Episode chronology
← Previous "Warning Signs"	Next → "What Comes After"
- The Walking Dead season 9

"The Obliged" is the fourth episode of the ninth season of the post-apocalyptic horror television series The Walking Dead, which aired on AMC on October 28, 2018. It was written by Geraldine Inoa and directed by Rosemary Rodriguez.

== Plot ==
In Alexandria, Michonne oversees the community, raising Judith, and writing her proposed code of laws for the communities, but at night, ventures out to fend off walkers. During one event, she loses her katana briefly, and finds the closest weapon at hand to defend herself, a baseball bat. This causes her to start considering Negan, held within a cell inside Alexandria.

Maggie, Daryl, and the Oceanside group conspire to assassinate Negan. They know Rick will not let Maggie into Alexandria as she has made her intentions clear, and start to work out a plan to bring Maggie into Alexandria without Rick's knowledge. Jesus, who is hesitant about this course of action, covertly contacts Rick to warn him.

Rick is overseeing the takedown of the bridge-construction camp, as without the Saviors, it is unlikely they will be able to finish the bridge in time before rising waters wash it away. Eugene warns Rick of two large hordes seen in the area, but both are moving divergent to their routes. Rick gets Jesus' word, and decides to head to Alexandria. He contacts one of the Alexandria watch points to tell them to be on the lookout for Maggie, unaware that the watch point is a member of Oceanside and complicit in Maggie's plan. When Rick prepares to go by horseback, Daryl offers to drive him there instead via motorcycle. Rick becomes concerned when Daryl purposely misses the turnoff for Alexandria. He demands Daryl stop the bike, and the two get into a fistfight. Both end up falling into a deep pit off the road that they cannot easily climb out of. They realize their conflict, with Daryl reminding Rick how many people have helped him and how some of his decisions have come to hurt those and others, like Glenn. The two agree to work together to escape the pit.

Meanwhile, Michonne has gone to see Negan after learning he is on a hunger strike, and gives him food, demanding he eat. He agrees on the condition she stays and talks. The two talk about their past, Negan having lost his wife Lucille, and Michonne having lost her own son Andre. During a second visit, when Negan asks what happened to his baseball bat, "Lucille", Michonne asserts it's still in the field, causing Negan to fall into anguish.

At the Scavengers' junkyard, Anne has secured Gabriel and threatens to let loose an armless walker on him. Gabriel tries to convince her to let him go, apologizing for his own past mistakes. Anne cannot bring herself to kill him, and instead knocks him out. When Gabriel awakes he finds himself alone in the junkyard, a note from Anne in his coat explaining that she has left for places unknown.

At the construction camp, the remaining survivors are preparing to move out when a group of Saviors, led by Jed, hold them at gunpoint. He demands the group turn over weapons for the Saviors to protect themselves, since they know Oceanside has been killing off the other Saviors. Carol lowers her weapon, but when Jed approaches her, she attacks him. A firefight breaks out, Rick and Daryl hear the sounds of gunfire and rush to escape. As they struggle to climb, walkers from one of the approaching hordes, drawn by the sound of gunfire, start falling into the pit, but both still manage to get out alive. Rick sees a loose horse nearby and offers to lead the walker horde away from the camp while Daryl drives off to warn them. Rick, on horseback, leads the horde along but is surprised when the other horde that Eugene warned him of is converging on the same point. The horse becomes frightened by the two hordes and rears, knocking Rick off its back. Rick lands hard on a concrete block and finds a piece of rebar has impaled his side, and is unable to move. Rick loses consciousness as the two hordes converge on him.

== Production ==
The scene between Rick and Daryl was added to this episode based on how showrunner Angela Kang had seen Daryl's actor, Norman Reedus, act during the finale of "Wrath", where Maggie reacts vengefully at Rick's decision to keep Negan alive. Kang said that Reedus had played that scene representing Daryl's disturbed state, feeling the need to help out Maggie but wanting to stay loyal to Rick. As part of closing out Rick's arc, they wanted to have closure on that angle, and thus wrote this scene for the two characters to come to terms. Kang worked with the scriptwriter Geraldine Inoa, her premiere story on the show, and with both Lincoln and Reedus to establish the dialog and actions for the scene. With Rick's departure from the show, they instead put Michonne in Rick's role from the comic series with respect to Negan, a person that Negan connects to in contentious ways.

== Reception ==
=== Critical reception ===
"The Obliged" received critical acclaim. On Rotten Tomatoes, the episode has an approval rating of 90% with an average score of 7.57 out of 10 based on 20 reviews. The critical consensus reads: "'The Obliged' continues the season's streak of excellent episodes, bolstered by a bittersweet performance from Andrew Lincoln."

=== Ratings ===
"The Obliged" received a total viewership of 5.10 million with a 2.0 rating in adults aged 18–49. It was the highest-rated cable program of the night, and the episode marked a slight increase in viewership from the previous week.
