= Lindsley Register =

American actress, producer and writer

- Born: November 5, 1993 (age 32); Blue Ridge Mountains, Virginia
- Occupations: Actress; producer; writer
- Years active: 2013–2021
- Spouse: Alexander McPherson (m. 2023)
- Children: 1

Lindsley Register is an American actress, producer and writer. She is best known for her role as Laura on The Walking Dead, and as Dharma on Six. She has also appeared in an episode of House of Cards.

== Early life and education ==
Register was born and raised in Blue Ridge Mountains of Virginia, United States. She was brought up with two older brothers and a younger sister. She went to Liberty University, and it was not until Register ditched a major in Teaching English as a Second Language during college that she started to take acting seriously. Register had a very traditional conservative Baptist upbringing. During college, Register started acting in plays, and this made her fall in love with acting; she realized this was something she wanted to pursue. Acting really broadened her views and mindset; it made her think from a different perspective, rather than her own which she was brought up with her entire life. Having a mentor figure really helped her with this change.

== Career ==
During her first year after graduating from college, Register received a costarring role in episode 404 of House of Cards, portraying one of the protesters opposite to Kevin Spacey. This would help her get several more roles in indie films and other notable shows, such as The Haves and the Have Nots, where she plays as Karen, and Outcast. Her first series regular role came in the new History channel series Six. Most recently, she has become well known for her role as Laura in The Walking Dead. Register joined The Walking Dead cast during season 7 of the show, and has been a part of the show ever since. In a YouTube video posted during the production of season 8, Register revealed how being called up to The Walking Dead was one of the most terrifying, yet exciting challenges and moments in her career. In that video, she explained how huge the step up was with the massive production set, especially with the character of Laura in her words "a stretch from who I am naturally". However, none of this would harm her performance. On November 14, 2018, Register announced on her Facebook page that she was part of the movie Scorn, which is set to be released later this year.

== Filmography ==
Year	Title	Role	Notes
2020	Scorn	Zoey Webster	
2019	Juanita	Candice	
2019	The Haves and the Have Nots	Karen	
2017–2018	Six	Dharma	Recurring role
2017	Extraordinary	Allison	
2017	Altar Egos	Holly	
2017	Unbridled	Stacy	
2017	Outcast	Churchgoer	
2016–2021	The Walking Dead	Laura	(seasons 7–10)
2016	Legends & Lies	New Jersey Widow	
2016	The Lost Day	Lisa Pond	
2016	God's Compass	Jane	
2016	House of Cards	Protester	
2016	The Wages of the Sin	Rebecca	
2015	Morsus	Lena Stiles	
2015	Uncommon	Melissa	
2015	Ave Maria	Maria Gibbons	
2015	Tell me Anything	Stacy	
2014	Spanish Gold	Penny	
2014	No Mercy	Peggy Wiltz	
2014	What If I Told You	Madison	
