= List of The Walking Dead (TV series) characters =

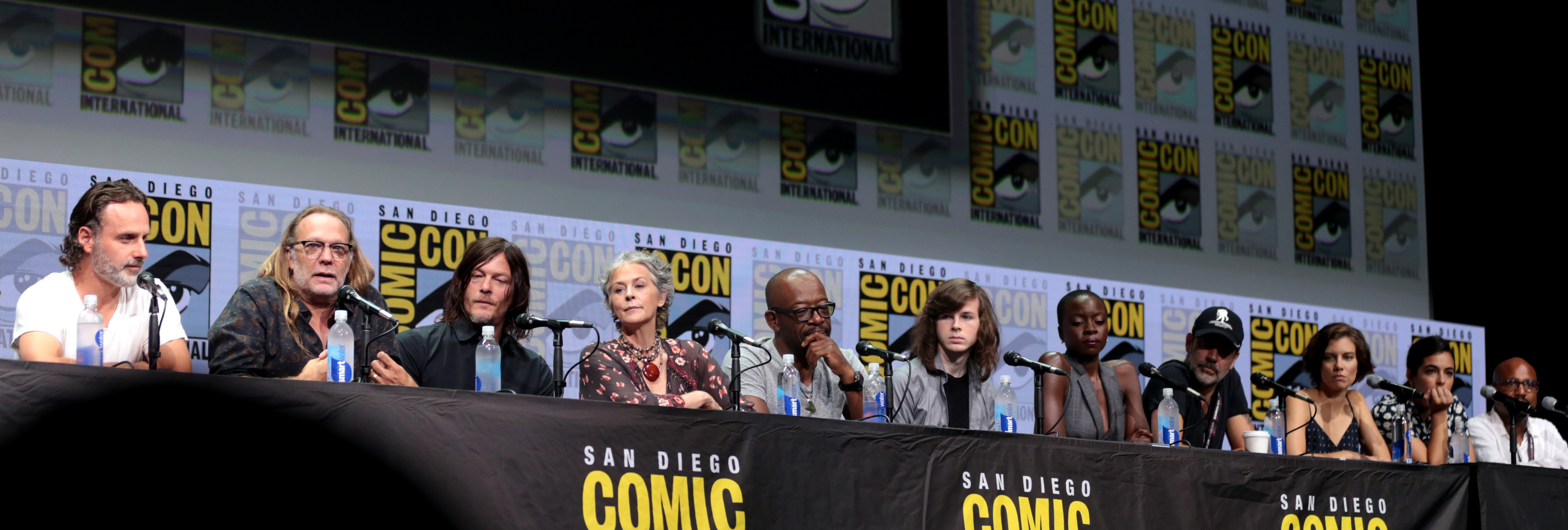
From left to right: Andrew Lincoln (Rick), Greg Nicotero (producer), Norman Reedus (Daryl), Melissa McBride (Carol), Lennie James (Morgan), Chandler Riggs (Carl), Danai Gurira (Michonne), Jeffrey Dean Morgan (Negan), Lauren Cohan (Maggie), Alanna Masterson (Tara), and Seth Gilliam (Gabriel) at the 2017 San Diego Comic-Con

The following is a list of characters from The Walking Dead television series based on the eponymous comic book series. Although some characters appear in both the television and comic series, the continuity of the television series is not shared with the original comic book series.

== Cast ==
=== Legend ===
Main; Actors who listed in the opening intro	Also Starring; Actors who are part of the main cast but are not listed in the opening intro, but rather under "Also Starring"	Recurring; Actors who are part of the supporting cast and are listed under "Also Starring" or "Co-Stars"

=== Main cast ===
Actor	Character	Seasons										
Actor	Character	1	2	3	4	5	6	7	8	9	10	11
Andrew Lincoln	Rick Grimes	Main	Main	Main	Main	Main	Main	Main	Main	Main		Special Guest
Jon Bernthal	Shane Walsh	Main	Main	Special Guest						Special Guest		
Sarah Wayne Callies	Lori Grimes	Main	Main	Main						Guest (Note: Uncredited voice role.)		
Laurie Holden	Andrea	Main	Main	Main								
Jeffrey DeMunn	Dale Horvath	Main	Main									
Steven Yeun	Glenn Rhee	Main (Note: Steven Yeun only appears in the first episode of season seven, although credited as a main cast member.)	Main	Main	Main	Main	Main	Main				
Chandler Riggs	Carl Grimes	Main	Main	Main	Main	Main	Main	Main	Main			
Norman Reedus	Daryl Dixon	Recurring	Main	Main	Main	Main	Main	Main	Main	Main	Main	Main
Lauren Cohan	Maggie Greene		Recurring	Main (Note: Cohan is not credited from 9.06 to 10.15, then as "Special Guest Star" in 10.16 and as a main cast member again starting from 10.17.)	Main	Main	Main	Main	Main	Main	Main	Main
Danai Gurira	Michonne		Stand-in	Main	Main	Main	Main	Main	Main	Main	Main	Special Guest
Michael Rooker	Merle Dixon	Guest	Guest	Main								
David Morrissey	The Governor			Main (Note: David Morrissey is listed as "Also Starring" in the fifth episode of season four.)	Main	Special Guest						
Melissa McBride	Carol Peletier	Recurring	Also starring	Also starring	Main	Main	Main	Main	Main	Main	Main	Main
Scott Wilson	Hershel Greene		Recurring	Also Starring	Main					Special Guest		
Michael Cudlitz	Abraham Ford				Recurring	Main (Note: Michael Cudlitz only appears in the first episode of season seven as a main cast member and as a special guest star in the season finale.)	Main	Main		Guest		
Emily Kinney	Beth Greene		Recurring	Recurring	Also Starring	Main				Guest		
Chad L. Coleman	Tyreese Williams			Recurring	Also Starring	Main						
Lennie James	Morgan Jones	Guest		Special Guest		Recurring (Note: First two appearances uncredited.)	Main	Main	Main	Guest		
Sonequa Martin-Green	Sasha Williams			Recurring	Also Starring	Also Starring	Main	Main		Special Guest		
Jeffrey Dean Morgan	Negan Smith						Special Guest	Main	Main	Main	Main	Main
Alanna Masterson	Tara Chambler				Recurring	Also Starring	Also Starring	Main (Note: Josh McDermitt, Christian Serratos and Alanna Masterson are listed as "Also Starring" in the first episode of season seven.)	Main	Main		
Josh McDermitt	Eugene Porter				Recurring	Also Starring	Also Starring	Main	Main	Main	Main	Main
Christian Serratos	Rosita Espinosa				Recurring	Also Starring	Also Starring	Main	Main	Main	Main	Main
Seth Gilliam	Gabriel Stokes					Also Starring	Also Starring	Also Starring	Main	Main	Main	Main
Ross Marquand	Aaron					Recurring	Also Starring	Also Starring	Main	Main	Main	Main
Katelyn Nacon	Enid					Guest	Recurring	Recurring	Also Starring	Main	Stand-in	
Tom Payne	Paul "Jesus" Rovia						Recurring	Also Starring	Also Starring	Main		
Khary Payton	Ezekiel Sutton							Recurring	Also Starring	Main (Note: Khary Payton is listed as "Also Starring" in the first five episodes of season nine.)	Main	Main
Samantha Morton	Alpha									Main (Note: Samantha Morton is listed as "Also Starring" in the ninth episode of season nine.)	Main	
Ryan Hurst	Beta									Recurring	Main	
Cooper Andrews	Jerry							Recurring	Recurring	Recurring	Also Starring	Main
Callan McAuliffe	Alden								Recurring	Also Starring	Also Starring	Main
Eleanor Matsuura	Yumiko									Recurring	Also Starring	Main (Note: Added in the opening credits from episode 17 onwards. Listed as "Also Starring" prior to this.)
Lauren Ridloff	Connie									Recurring	Also Starring	Main
Cailey Fleming	Judith Grimes			Recurring (Note: Various child actors portrayed Judith from seasons 3 to 9 until Fleming assumed the role midway through the ninth season.)	Recurring	Recurring	Recurring	Recurring	Recurring	Recurring	Also Starring	Main
Nadia Hilker	Magna									Recurring	Also Starring	Main
Cassady McClincy	Lydia									Recurring	Also Starring	Main
Angel Theory	Kelly									Recurring	Recurring	Main (Note: Added in the opening credits from episode 17 onwards, previously the recurring cast.)
Paola Lázaro	Juanita "Princess" Sanchez										Recurring	Main
Michael James Shaw	Michael Mercer											Main
Josh Hamilton	Lance Hornsby											Main
Laila Robins	Pamela Milton											Main
Lawrence Gilliard Jr.	Bob Stookey				Also Starring (Note: Lawrence Gilliard Jr. is credited as a special guest star in the ninth episode of season five.)	Also Starring						
Andrew J. West	Gareth				Guest	Also Starring						
Alexandra Breckenridge	Jessie Anderson					Recurring	Also Starring					
Austin Nichols	Spencer Monroe					Recurring	Also Starring	Also Starring				
Tovah Feldshuh	Deanna Monroe					Recurring	Also Starring					
Austin Amelio	Dwight						Recurring	Also Starring	Also Starring			
Xander Berkeley	Gregory						Guest	Also Starring (Note: Xander Berkeley only appears in the first episode of season nine, although credited as "Also Starring".)	Also Starring	Also Starring		
Steven Ogg	Simon						Guest	Recurring	Also Starring			
Pollyanna McIntosh	Anne "Jadis"							Recurring	Also Starring	Also Starring		
Avi Nash	Siddiq								Recurring	Also Starring	Also Starring	
Lynn Collins	Leah Shaw										Guest	Also Starring
Margot Bingham	Maxxine "Stephanie" Mercer									Guest (Note: Uncredited voice role in season nine.)	Guest	Also Starring

=== Recurring cast ===
Actor	Character	Seasons										
Actor	Character	1	2	3	4	5	6	7	8	9	10	11
Emma Bell	Amy	Recurring		Guest								
Andrew Rothenberg	Jim	Recurring		Guest								
IronE Singleton	Theodore "T-Dog" Douglas	Recurring	Recurring	Recurring								
Juan Pareja	Morales	Recurring							Guest			
Jeryl Prescott Sales	Jacqui	Recurring		Guest								
Adam Minarovich	Ed Peletier	Recurring	Guest									
Madison Lintz	Sophia Peletier	Recurring	Recurring									
Viviana Chavez-Vega	Miranda Morales	Recurring										
Maddie Lomax	Eliza Morales	Recurring										
Noah Lomax	Louis Morales	Recurring										
Pruitt Taylor Vince	Otis		Recurring									
Jane McNeill	Patricia		Recurring									
Michael Zegen	Randall Culver		Recurring									
James Allen McCune	Jimmy		Recurring									
Brandon Fobbs	Terry		Guest	Recurring	Guest							
Aldis Hodge	Mike		Guest	Recurring	Guest							
Lew Temple	Axel			Recurring								
Markice Moore	Andrew			Recurring								
Lawrence Kao	Tim			Recurring								
Alexa Nikolas	Haley			Recurring								
Dallas Roberts	Milton Mamet			Recurring								
Tyler Chase	Ben			Recurring								
Vincent M. Ward	Oscar			Recurring								
Daniel Thomas May	Allen			Recurring	Guest							
Travis Love	Shumpert			Recurring	Guest							
Jose Pablo Cantillo	Caesar Martinez			Recurring	Guest							
Melissa Ponzio	Karen			Recurring	Recurring	Guest						
Vincent Martella	Patrick				Recurring							
Kennedy Brice	Molly				Recurring							
Audrey Marie Anderson	Lilly Chambler				Recurring							
Meyrick Murphy	Meghan Chambler				Recurring							
Marcus Hester	Len				Recurring							
Keith Brooks	Dan				Recurring							
J. D. Evermore	Harley				Recurring							
Eric Mendenhall	Billy				Recurring							
Sunkrish Bala	Dr. Caleb "Dr. S." Subramanian				Recurring							
Luke Donaldson	Luke				Recurring							
Sherry Richards	Jeanette				Recurring							
Jeff Kober	Joe				Recurring							
Davi Jay	Tony				Recurring							
Brandon Carroll	David				Recurring	Guest						
Kerry Condon	Clara				Recurring							
Juliana Harkavy	Alisha				Recurring							
Denise Crosby	Mary				Recurring	Guest						
Brighton Sharbino	Lizzie Samuels				Recurring	Special Guest						
Kyla Kenedy	Mika Samuels				Recurring	Special Guest						
Tyler James Williams	Noah					Recurring						
Chris Coy	Martin					Recurring						
Ricky Wayne	O'Donnell					Recurring						
Christine Woods	Dawn Lerner					Recurring						
Erik Jensen	Dr. Steven Edwards					Recurring						
Teri Wyble	Amanda Shepherd					Recurring						
Steve Coulter	Reg Monroe					Recurring						
Daniel Bonjour	Aiden Monroe					Recurring						
Corey Brill	Pete Anderson					Recurring						
April Billingsley	Theresa					Recurring						
Tiffany Morgan	Erin					Recurring	Guest					
Major Dodson	Sam Anderson					Recurring	Recurring					
Austin Abrams	Ron Anderson					Recurring	Recurring					
Michael Traynor	Nicholas					Recurring	Recurring					
Jason Douglas	Tobin					Recurring	Recurring	Recurring	Recurring			
Ann Mahoney	Olivia					Recurring	Recurring	Recurring				
Jordan Woods-Robinson	Eric Raleigh					Recurring	Recurring	Recurring	Recurring			
Dahlia Legault	Francine					Guest	Recurring	Recurring	Guest			
Mandi Christine Kerr	Barbara					Guest	Recurring	Guest	Recurring	Guest	Recurring	Guest
David Marshall Silverman	Kent					Guest	Recurring	Recurring				
Ted Huckabee	Bruce					Guest	Recurring	Guest	Recurring			
Benedict Samuel	Owen					Guest	Recurring					
Merritt Wever	Dr. Denise Cloyd						Recurring					
Jay Huguley	David						Recurring					
Corey Hawkins	Heath						Recurring	Guest				
Kenric Green	Scott						Recurring	Recurring	Recurring	Recurring	Recurring	
Vanessa Cloke	Anna						Recurring	Guest				
Daniel Newman	Daniel						Guest	Recurring	Recurring			
Christine Evangelista	Sherry						Guest	Recurring				
Peter Zimmerman	Eduardo						Guest	Recurring	Recurring			
James Chen	Kal						Guest	Recurring	Recurring	Recurring		
Karen Ceesay	Bertie						Guest	Recurring	Recurring	Guest	Recurring	
R. Keith Harris	Dr. Harlan Carson						Guest	Guest	Recurring			
Elizabeth Ludlow	Arat							Recurring	Recurring	Recurring		
Lindsley Register	Laura							Recurring	Recurring	Recurring	Recurring	
Mike Seal	Gary							Recurring	Recurring			
Jayson Warner Smith	Gavin							Recurring	Recurring			
Joshua Mikel	Jared							Recurring	Recurring			
Macsen Lintz	Henry							Recurring	Recurring	Guest		
Matt Lintz	Henry									Recurring	Guest	
Logan Miller	Benjamin							Recurring				
Kerry Cahill	Dianne							Recurring	Recurring	Recurring	Recurring	Recurring
Carlos Navarro	Alvaro							Recurring	Recurring			
Karl Makinen	Richard							Recurring				
Anthony Lopez	Oscar							Guest	Recurring	Recurring	Recurring	
Sydney Park	Cyndie							Guest	Recurring	Recurring	Guest	
Briana Venskus	Beatrice							Guest	Recurring	Recurring	Guest	
Mimi Kirkland	Rachel Ward							Guest	Recurring	Guest		
Avianna Mynhier	Rachel Ward									Guest	Recurring	Guest
Nicole Barré	Kathy							Guest	Recurring	Recurring		
Nadine Marissa	Nabila							Guest	Recurring	Recurring	Recurring	Recurring
Ethan Charles	Hershel Rhee							Guest				
Peyton Lockridge	Hershel Rhee									Recurring		
Kien Michael Spiller	Hershel Rhee										Guest	Recurring
Traci Dinwiddie	Regina								Recurring	Recurring		
Various	Gracie								Recurring	Guest		
Anabelle Holloway	Gracie									Recurring	Recurring	Recurring
Matt Mangum	D.J.								Recurring	Recurring	Guest	
Aaron Farb	Norris								Recurring	Recurring		
Brett Butler	Tammy Rose Sutton									Recurring		
John Finn	Earl Sutton									Recurring	Recurring	
Gustavo Gomez	Marco									Recurring	Recurring	Guest
Rhys Coiro	Jed									Recurring		
Tamara Austin	Nora									Recurring	Recurring	
Dan Fogler	Luke									Recurring	Recurring	Recurring
Antony Azor	Rick "R.J." Jr.									Recurring	Recurring	Recurring
Kelley Mack	Adeline "Addy"									Recurring		
Jackson Pace	Gage									Recurring	Recurring	Guest
Joe Ando-Hirsh	Rodney									Recurring		
Alex Sgambati	Jules										Recurring	Recurring
Thora Birch	Mary "Gamma"										Recurring	
Juan Javier Cardenas	Dante										Recurring	
Blaine Kern III	Brandon										Recurring	
Jerri Tubbs	Margo										Recurring	
David Shae	Alfred										Recurring	
Rebecca Koon	Cheryl										Recurring	
Kevin Carroll	Virgil										Recurring	Guest
Okea Eme-Akwari	Elijah										Guest	Recurring
James Devoti	Cole										Guest	Recurring
Glenn Stanton	Frost											Recurring
Laurie Fortier	Agatha											Recurring
Marcus Lewis	Duncan											Recurring
Alex Meraz	Brandon Carver											Recurring
Ritchie Coster	Pope											Recurring
Dikran Tulaine	Mancea											Recurring
Chelle Ramos	Shira "Stephanie Vega"											Recurring
Ian Anthony Dale	Tomichi "Tomi" Okumura											Recurring
Teo Rapp-Olsson	Sebastian Milton											Recurring
Medina Senghore	Annie											Recurring

== Main characters ==
=== Rick Grimes ===
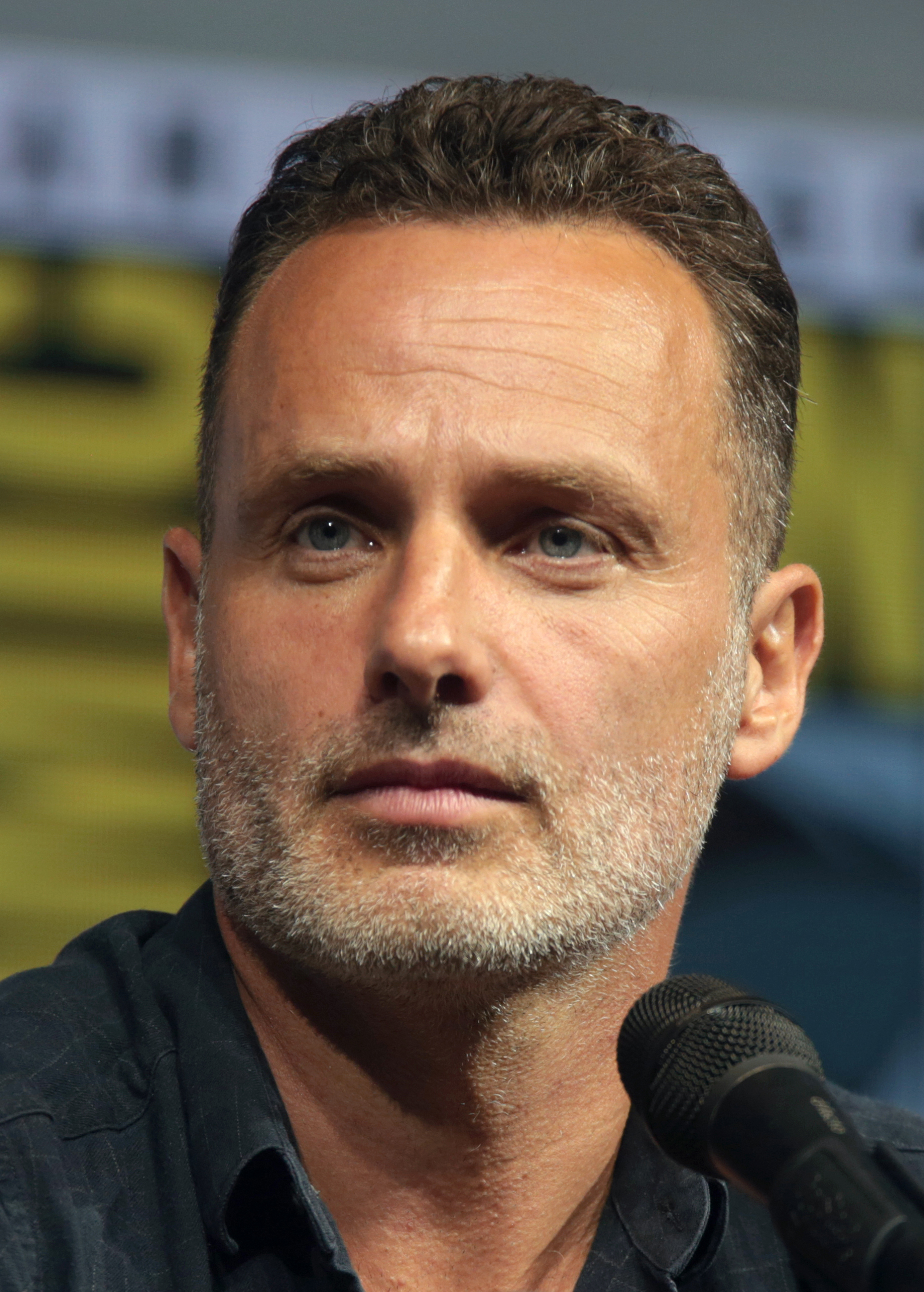
Andrew Lincoln

Rick Grimes, portrayed by Andrew Lincoln, is a former sheriff's deputy from a small Georgia town. He is an everyman—smart, calm, just, a sharpshooter, and a good friend, husband and father—but flawed. Rick is a natural leader, someone his fellow survivors will turn to in a crisis, confident in his guidance, even when he at times doubts himself. His overwhelming need to do the right thing and protect those who cannot protect themselves may pull him away from his family, causing cracks of tension within his marriage with Lori and his relationship with his son, Carl. Frustrated about leading his group and keeping them safe, Rick gradually changes into a darker person.

Eventually, he breaks down once again, following the deaths of Glenn and Abraham, and the overshadowing presence of Negan—the series' central antagonist in season six and seven. Throughout season seven, Rick slowly regains his footing and then starts preparing for an all-out war against Negan and the Saviors. However, before the war is over, Carl dies when a walker bites him with his last wish being for his father to find a way to forgive Negan and even join forces with him so that a large, strong community can live in peace, safe from walkers. Rick is then torn between his desire for revenge and his son's final wish for reconciliation. At the end of season eight, Rick manages to find a middle ground by almost, but not quite killing Negan and deciding to keep him locked inside a prison cell in Alexandria, thus ending the war.

When Rick and the communities decide to build a bridge the following season, chaos erupts with the rebellious, remaining Saviors and conflict with members of Rick's group who believe Negan should die in retribution for brutally murdering Glenn and Abraham. In the midst of the conflict, Rick is critically wounded, the bridge is blown up, and Rick is presumed dead. However, unbeknownst to Michonne, Daryl, and the rest of the community, a nearly dead Rick is discovered by Jadis, who arranges him to be taken off in a helicopter with her to an unknown destination. In the series finale, Judith reveals to Daryl and Carol the truth about Michonne's departure in search of Rick, who is still alive.

=== Shane ===
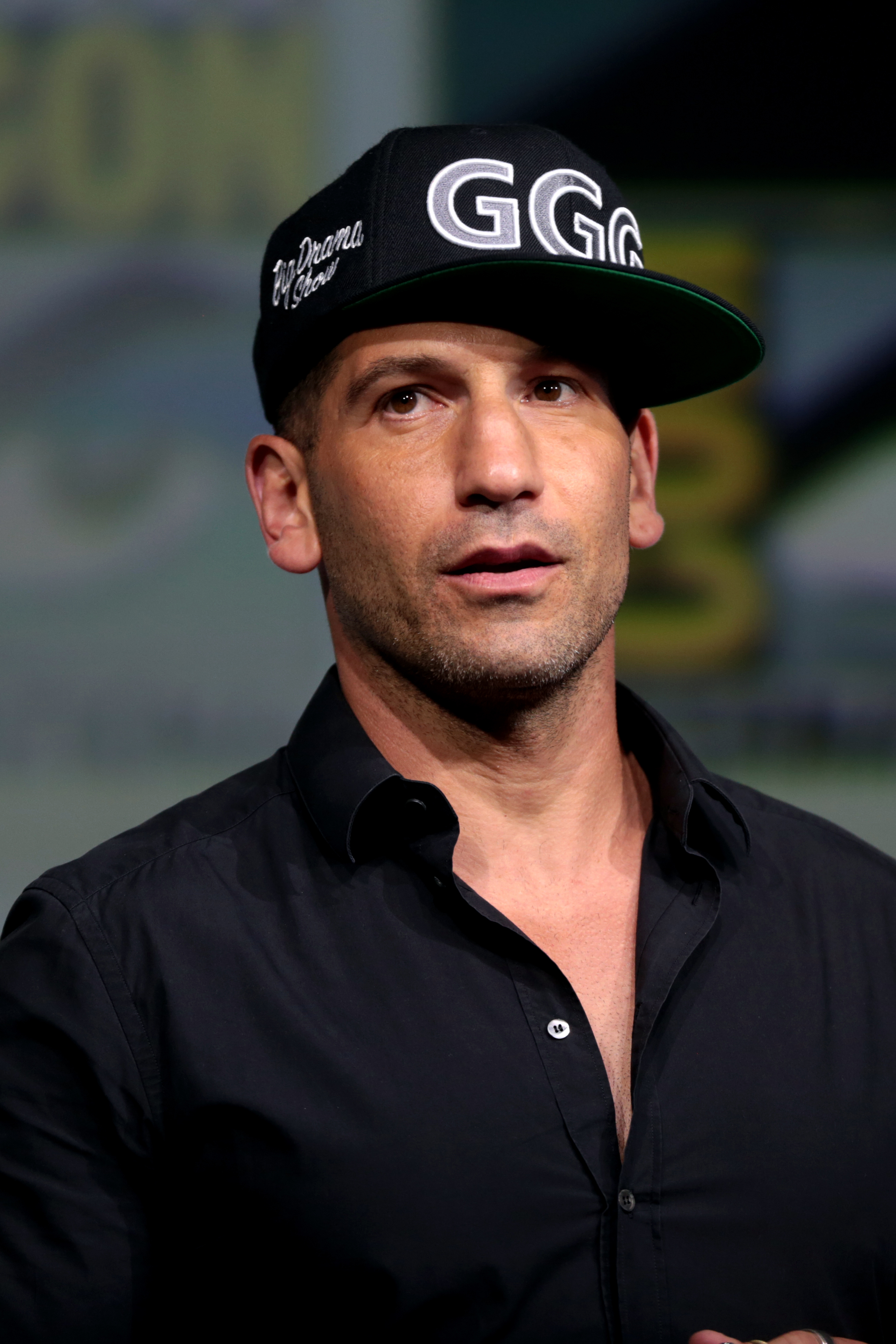
Jon Bernthal

Shane Walsh, portrayed by Jon Bernthal, is a former sheriff's deputy from a small Georgia town. He was Rick's partner in the sheriff's department and his best friend since high school.

After the walkers begin to take over, Shane goes to visit Rick in the hospital, where he has lain in a coma since being shot. He cannot save Rick (and he also welcomes this opportunity to take Rick's place with Lori and Carl), but he blocks the hospital door with a gurney and hopes Rick will die quietly of natural causes. Until Rick's recovery and reappearance, Shane led the group of Atlanta survivors and was Lori's lover. His fixation on Lori becomes very obsessive and deranged, though he tries to acclimate to the reality of Rick as leader of the group and Lori's rightful husband. Additionally, Shane shows a ruthless side, allowing Otis to be killed by walkers so that he can escape. Rick eventually confronts him for all his atrocities, but even so he forgives him. Later, Shane formulates a plan to kill Rick but fails. Rick ends his life with a knife in the chest and Carl then ends his reanimation.

=== Lori Grimes ===
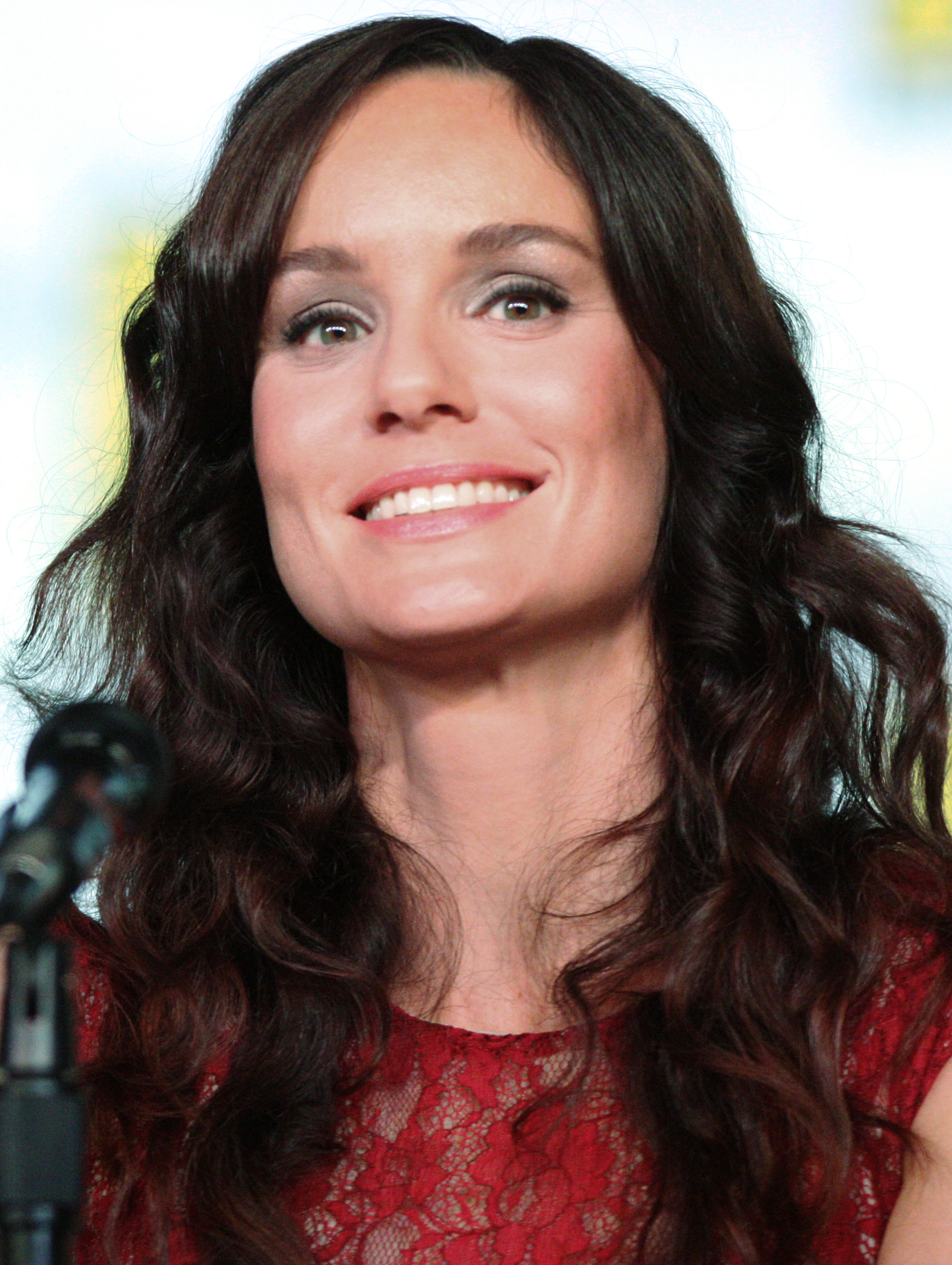
Sarah Wayne Callies

Lori Grimes, portrayed by Sarah Wayne Callies, is Rick's wife, and Carl and Judith's mother. In the first season, Lori believes that Rick has died in the hospital from a gunshot wound, while the walkers are taking over, creating chaos and forcing Lori and Carl to run, under the protection of Shane. A few episodes later, they find out Rick is alive. When Rick reunites with Lori, this attracts the harassment of Shane who gradually becomes more and more hostile even when he knows that she is expecting a child of his. Eventually, Rick manages to learn about this event afterwards.

From their escape from Hershel's farm to their endeavor to take up residence at a prison, Lori becomes increasingly estranged from Rick and Carl, which she blames on herself; she becomes worried about her baby's survival. In "Killer Within", when she goes into labor during an unexpected walker attack, Lori convinces Maggie to give her a C-section, despite the fact that it will prove fatal for her. Lori then dies giving birth and Carl is forced to shoot her to prevent reanimation; this breaks Rick into an emotional state.

=== Andrea ===
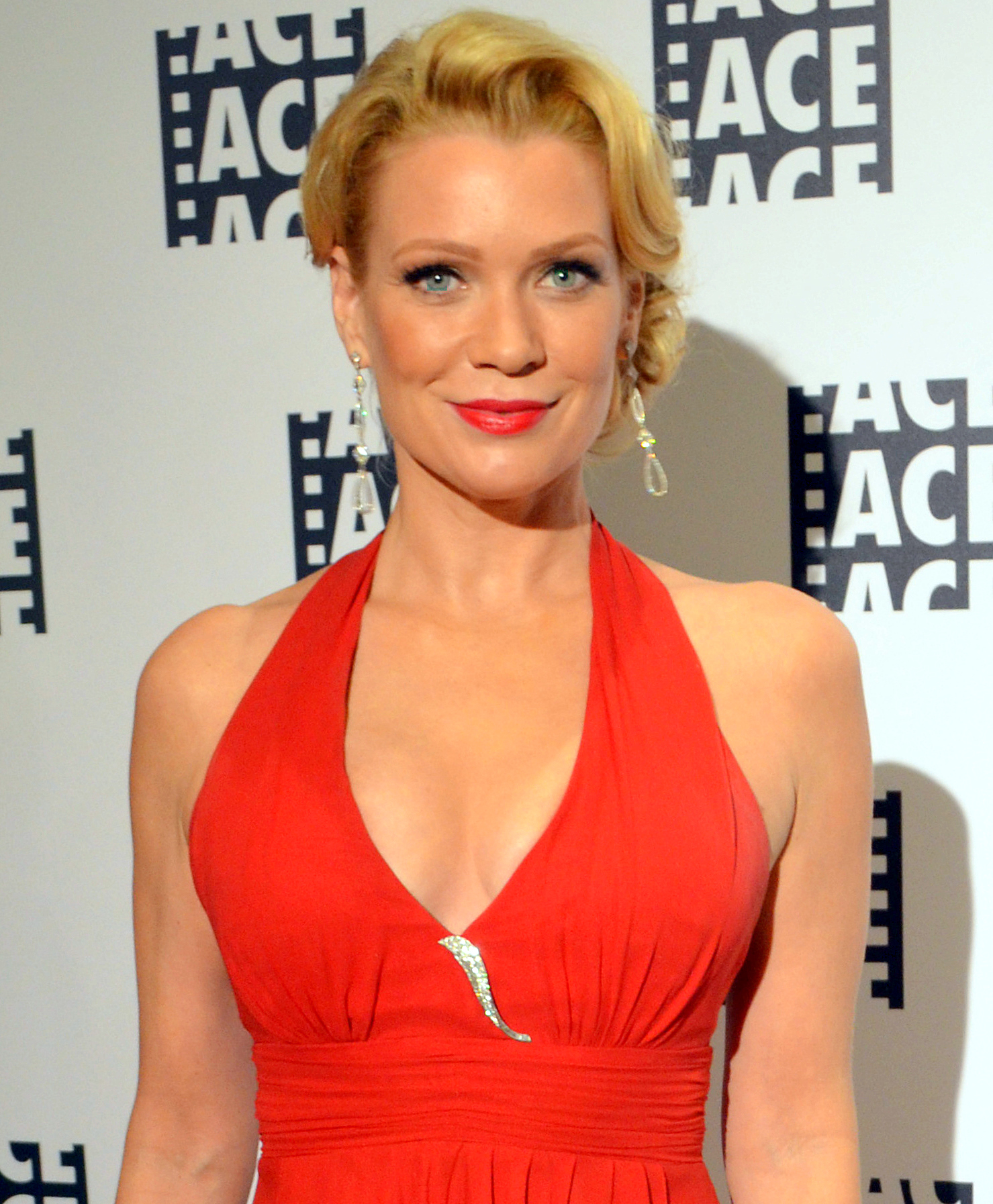
Laurie Holden

Andrea, portrayed by Laurie Holden, is a former civil rights attorney who is extremely protective of her younger sister Amy. Following Amy's death, she considers suicide, but decides to remain with the group.

With the others, they find a farm owned by Hershel Greene. At the farm, she continued to confide and seek comfort in Dale, and gains survivalist skills through Shane. After escaping Hershel's overrun farm, she is rescued by Michonne and is brought by Merle to Woodbury, where she begins a romantic relationship with The Governor.

She is eventually caught in the crossfire between Rick and The Governor, and attempts to mend relations, but later turns on The Governor after learning that he intends to attack the prison. Afterwards, Andrea leaves Woodbury and reaches the prison perimeter, but is secretly followed and tackled by The Governor, who then returns her to Woodbury. She is then locked in his torture chamber, gagged and bound to a dental chair, with an undead Milton. However, before she is able to free herself, the reanimated Milton bites her. After the failed attempt to attack the prison by The Governor, a nearly dead Andrea is found by Rick, Daryl, Michonne, and Tyreese where she makes amends before taking her own life with Michonne by her side.

=== Dale ===
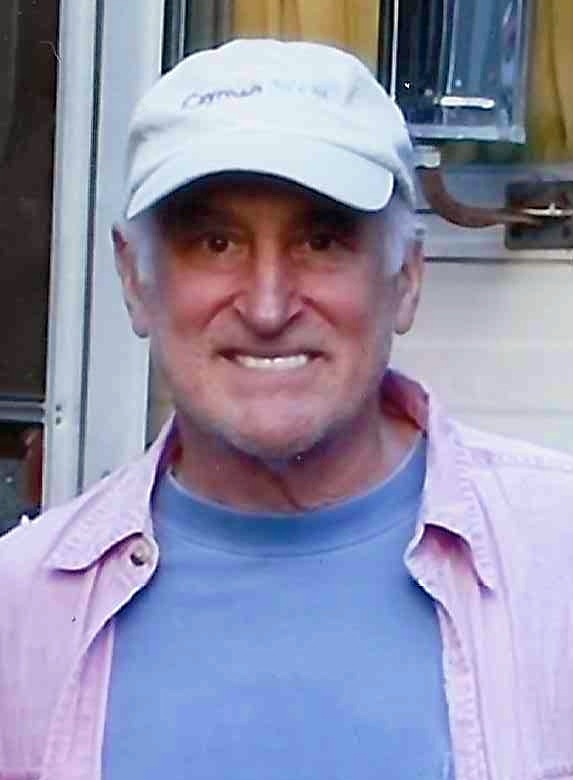
Jeffrey DeMunn

Dale Horvath, portrayed by Jeffrey DeMunn, is an older man and former car salesman. His age, calm affect, worldly experience, and RV provide the nucleus around that the small group of survivors has formed. In addition to being wise and the respected elder of the group, Dale is rather feisty and not afraid to speak his mind or call others out for their mistakes in judgment. At the CDC, he manages to talk Andrea out of a suicide attempt by putting himself at risk, as well; however, Andrea acts cold towards Dale afterward.

Eventually, Dale becomes wary of Shane, after witnessing that the latter contemplated assassinating Rick beforehand as well as guessing that Shane killed Otis while retrieving medical supplies for Carl. He later worries that the group is losing its humanity when they decide to kill Randall in order to avoid any risks he might have posed. Dale argues for sparing his life, leading to the execution being postponed. That night, Dale is disemboweled by a walker that was unintentionally lured by Carl earlier that day; he begins to slowly suffer to death. Since his injuries are beyond treatment, Daryl mercy kills Dale. His death causes the group to reevaluate their unity and allow Randall to live; nevertheless, Shane kills Randall in secret.

=== Glenn Rhee ===
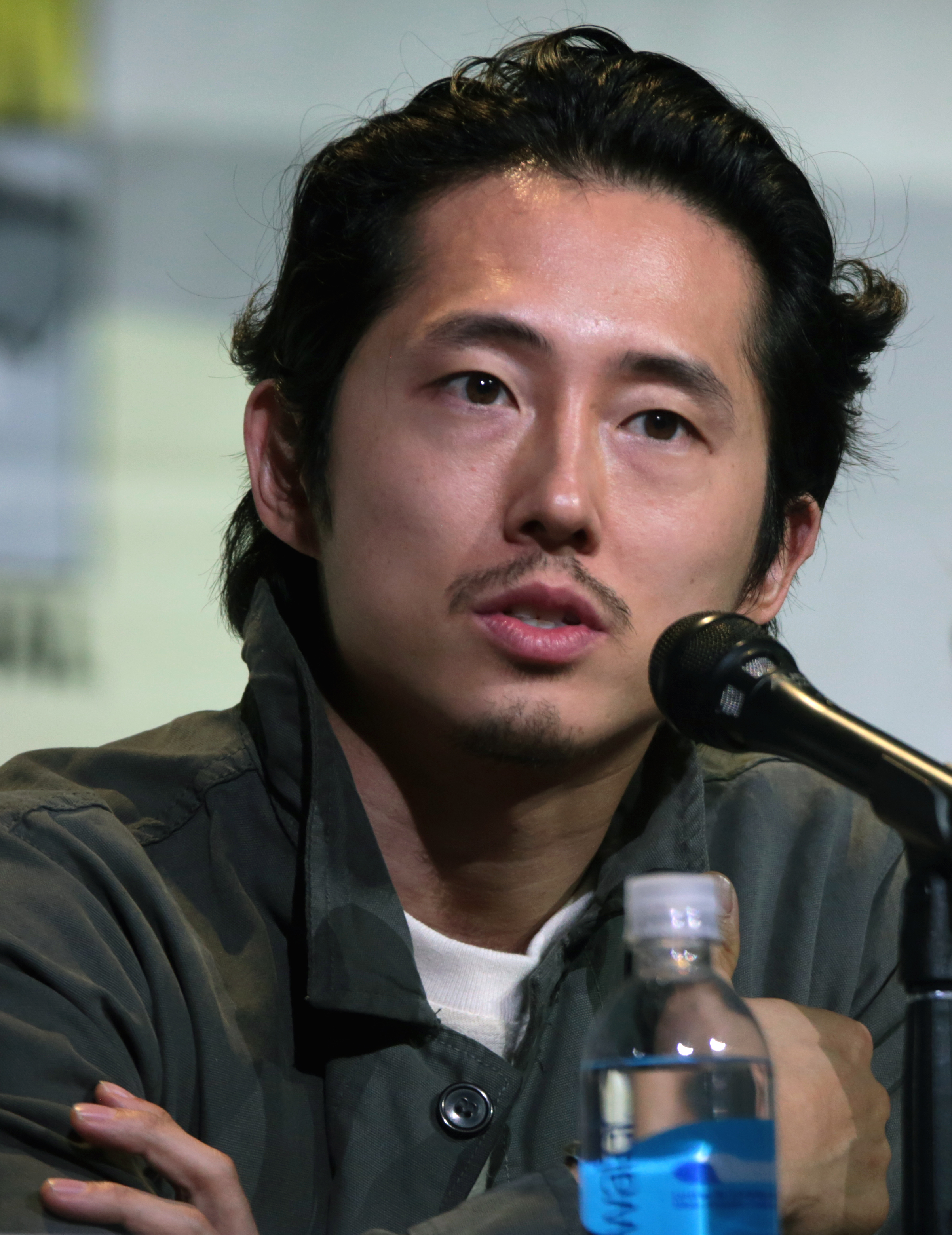
Steven Yeun

Glenn Rhee, portrayed by Steven Yeun, is a former pizza delivery boy from Atlanta who knows every shortcut in Atlanta. Glenn saves Rick's life at the beginning of the outbreak and helps him find his wife Lori and son Carl. As time goes by, Glenn becomes a very important member of the Hershel-inspired group as well as a supply courier in his experience of knowing the streets. While at the farm, he meets Hershel's daughter Maggie; the two fall in love and marry eventually with Hershel's blessing.

Together, they manage to pass many hard tests as they travel northward, eventually arriving at the Alexandria Safe-Zone. When Maggie experiences complications in her pregnancy, Glenn, along with Aaron, Abraham, Carl, Daryl, Eugene, Maggie, Michonne, Rick, Rosita and Sasha, drive to the Hilltop Colony for medical assistance. However, at the nightfall, the group is surrounded by a large group of Saviors at a clearing and forced to kneel before their leader Negan.

As punishment for a previous raid on a Savior outpost led by Rick, Negan's wrath lands on Abraham and Daryl's reaction to Abraham's death causes Negan to additionally bludgeon Glenn to death with his barbed wired baseball bat he calls "Lucille", traumatizing the surviving members of Rick's group. Glenn's remains are then taken by Maggie and Sasha to the Hilltop, where he and Abraham are buried together.

=== Carl Grimes ===
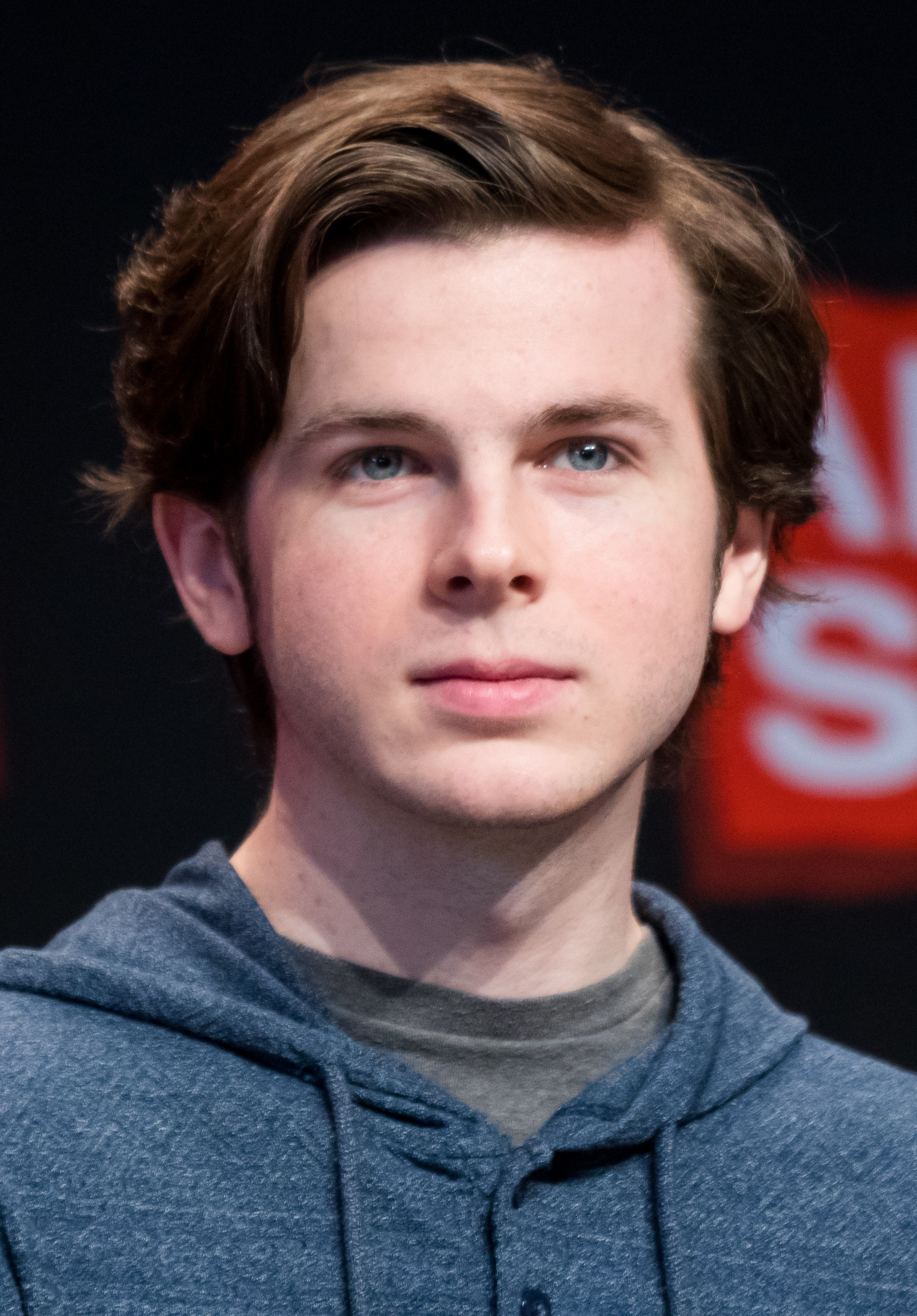
Chandler Riggs

Carl Grimes, portrayed by Chandler Riggs, is Rick and Lori's son and Judith's older brother. His innocence diminishes as he begins to discover and experience the brutality in the world. While approaching a deer in the woods, he is accidentally shot by Hershel's friend Otis; Hershel manages to save Carl's life. In later episodes set at the prison, Carl witnesses his mother's death during childbirth and assumes the responsibility for putting a bullet in her brain to halt reanimation.

Carl's emotional equilibrium is stabilized upon arrival at the Alexandria Safe-Zone. He begins to form friendships with the original residents there and Enid, a young girl who narrowly escaped walkers after they killed her parents. When a walking swarm invades the community, Carl accidentally receives a shot in the right eye, but manages to recover and adapts in the moral balance until the arrival of Negan. Before the war against the Saviors, Carl hatches a daring plan to infiltrate the Sanctuary and kill Negan; however, they end up forming an interesting relationship as Negan tries his best to bond with the youngling.

Negan is hugely impressed with Carl's determination, and frequently makes comparisons between Carl and Rick. Nonetheless, Negan never hesitates to endanger Carl's life, first by ordering Rick to amputate his arm; however, just as Rick is about to go through with it, Negan stops him, believing Rick to now be submissive. The next time Negan endangers Carl's life is when he prepares to strike and kill Carl with Lucille during the Saviors' first assault on Alexandria; however, soldiers from the Hilltop Colony and the Kingdom stop this act by their surprise attack on the Saviors causing a battle to ensue.

Later, Carl meets Siddiq and helps him repel a walker attack in the woods, but is bitten on the torso by a walker. Some days later, during the Saviors' second attack on Alexandria, Carl reveals the secret to his father and Michonne that he was bitten. He gives his father a stack of letters that he wrote to the group (including Negan) and commits suicide to prevent his reanimation.

=== Daryl Dixon ===
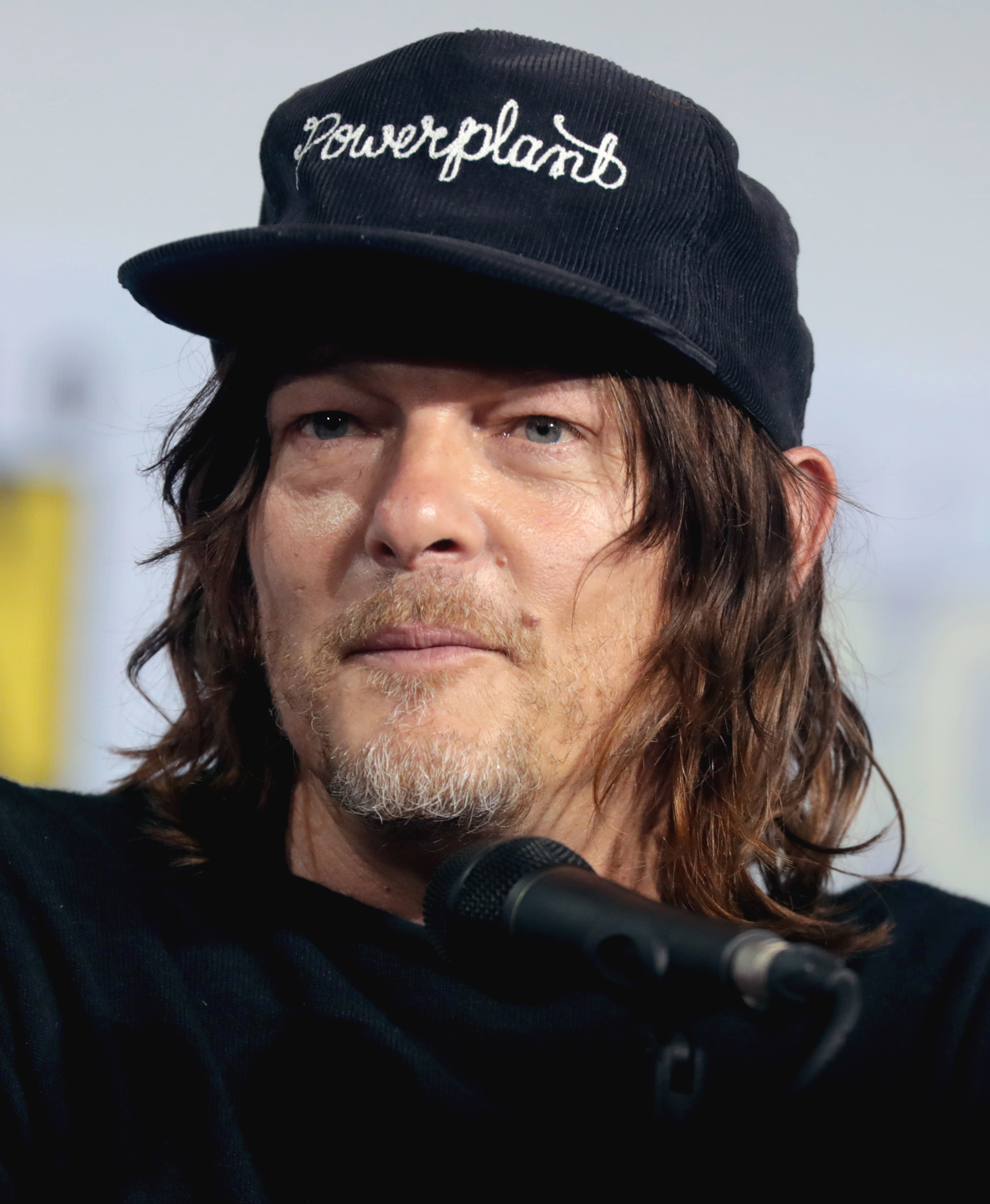
Norman Reedus

Daryl Dixon, portrayed by Norman Reedus, is Merle's younger brother. A Southern redneck with a tough background, Daryl is a survivalist and member of the Atlanta band. At first he held hostility towards the Atlanta group, but with the passage of time, he quickly becomes one of Rick's closest confidantes and a leader within the group. Daryl is Rick's best friend and his right-hand man.

Daryl keeps mainly to himself, reluctant to reveal his emotional inner life. He feels great guilt over the death of his older brother Merle, his inability to find Carol's daughter Sophia before the walkers do, the murder of Beth at Grady Hospital, and his inadvertent role in the death of Glenn. After Negan's murdering rampage, Daryl is captured, imprisoned and emotionally tortured by Negan and the Saviors. Negan's followers all declare their fidelity to Negan by saying "I am Negan."

However, despite weeks of torture and deprivation, Daryl never fails to respond "I am Daryl", and eventually earns Negan's grudging respect. In season nine, Daryl helps Michonne rescue Judith and all the other Alexandria Safe-Zone children from a ruthless woman, Jocelyn, who has brainwashed and trained a group of children to kill. He and Michonne both are branded with the letter "X" on their backs.

=== Carol Peletier ===
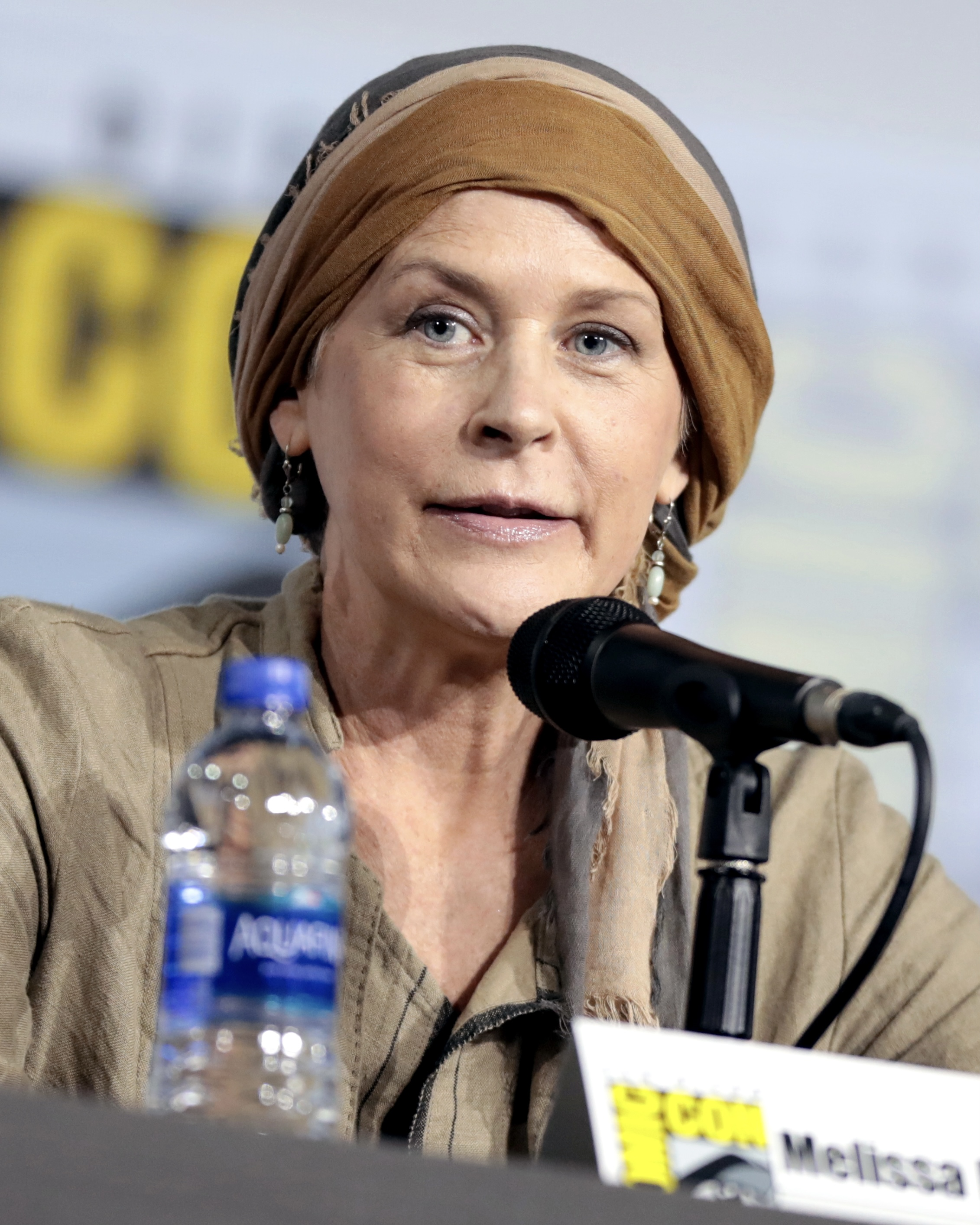
Melissa McBride

Carol Peletier, portrayed by Melissa McBride, is Sophia's protective mother and Ed's abused wife. After Sophia's death, Carol begins to form a great strength in her, becoming a very important component in the group and is able to do anything to keep the group intact. She begins to show a ruthless side that worries Rick, who exiles her while they are at the prison. However, Carol later earns her way back into Rick's inner circle. She promises Mika and Lizzie's dying father that she will take care of his daughters and does her best to keep this promise, even after discovering that Lizzie is insane and attempting to befriend walkers. Ultimately, Carol is forced to kill Lizzie after Lizzie kills her sister in an attempt to turn her into a walker playmate.

Carol proves to be a very strong and skilled member during the rescue of Rick's group in Terminus, the attack of the Wolves in the Alexandria Safe-Zone, and the war against Negan and the Saviors. She later marries Ezekiel, and the two adopt Henry as their own son. When Carol discovers that Alpha murdered Henry, she is totally devastated and unable to sustain Ezekiel's fantasy of Carol as his "queen". However, she separates from him during the blizzard at the end of season nine and returns to Alexandria.

Throughout the series, Carol has formed a strong but gentle bond with Daryl. Numerous times, each believes the other to be dead, and their later reunions are joyous.

=== Maggie Greene ===
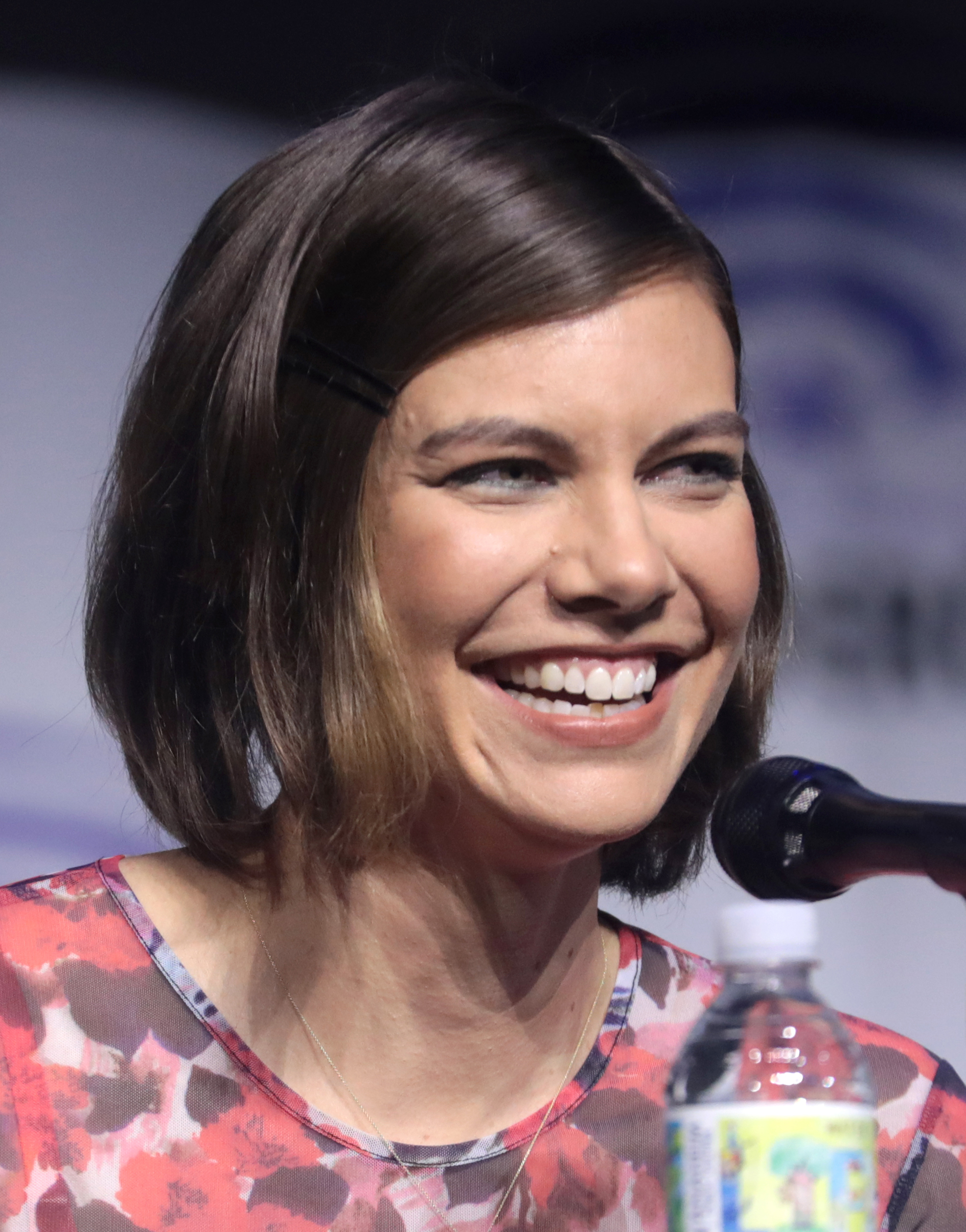
Lauren Cohan

Maggie Greene (later Maggie Rhee), portrayed by Lauren Cohan, is Hershel's daughter and Beth's elder half-sister. She scavenges supplies from the local town. Soon after she meets Glenn, they form a sexual relationship and soon fall in love. Eventually, the two marry while residing at the prison. Over the course of time, both go through hard tests which makes Glenn a pillar, a sustenance in the life of Maggie for her moral balance. She also forms a strong bond of friendship with Sasha.

Months after arriving at the Alexandria Safe-Zone, Maggie reveals to Aaron that she is pregnant with Glenn's child. After the introduction of Paul Rovio (a.k.a. Jesus), Maggie is part of an advance group that visits the Hilltop Colony and attempts to form an alliance with their leader Gregory. However, Gregory is arrogant, determined not to relinquish his position of power (or even to admit he can use help), and rebuffs Maggie disrespectfully.

As the war with Negan and the Saviors intensifies, Gregory sees no choice but to join forces with Negan. Maggie by this time has made the Hilltop her home. She has become a widow, with Glenn being bludgeoned to death by Negan with his barbed wired baseball bat he calls "Lucille". From that point, her dual focus is to safely deliver the baby and to avenge Glenn's death. She assumes a leadership role at the Hilltop; Gregory hates her and continually tries to undermine her.

Rick comes close to killing Negan during the final battle, but chooses to honor Carl's memory by imprisoning Negan for life; Maggie protests this loudly. She and Daryl (who also suffered at Negan's hands) agree that Negan should not be allowed to live, but they wait and watch for a good opportunity. Meanwhile, Maggie is still attempting to lead the Hilltop as best she can. After one final betrayal by Gregory is one too many, Maggie decides to make an example of Gregory (and eliminate his trouble-making once and for all) by hanging him.

She soon sees repeated attempts by the Saviors to sabotage and undermine Rick's work, so she decides the time has come to execute Negan. However, when she visits him at his prison cell at Alexandria, Maggie sees that he is broken and no longer the tyrannical leader who killed Glenn. At some point, during the six years after Rick's supposed death at the destruction of the bridge, she left the Hilltop alongside her son Hershel to join Georgie's group. In "A Certain Doom" Maggie returns to assist the group in the war against The Whisperers saving Father Gabriel from certain death.

=== Michonne ===
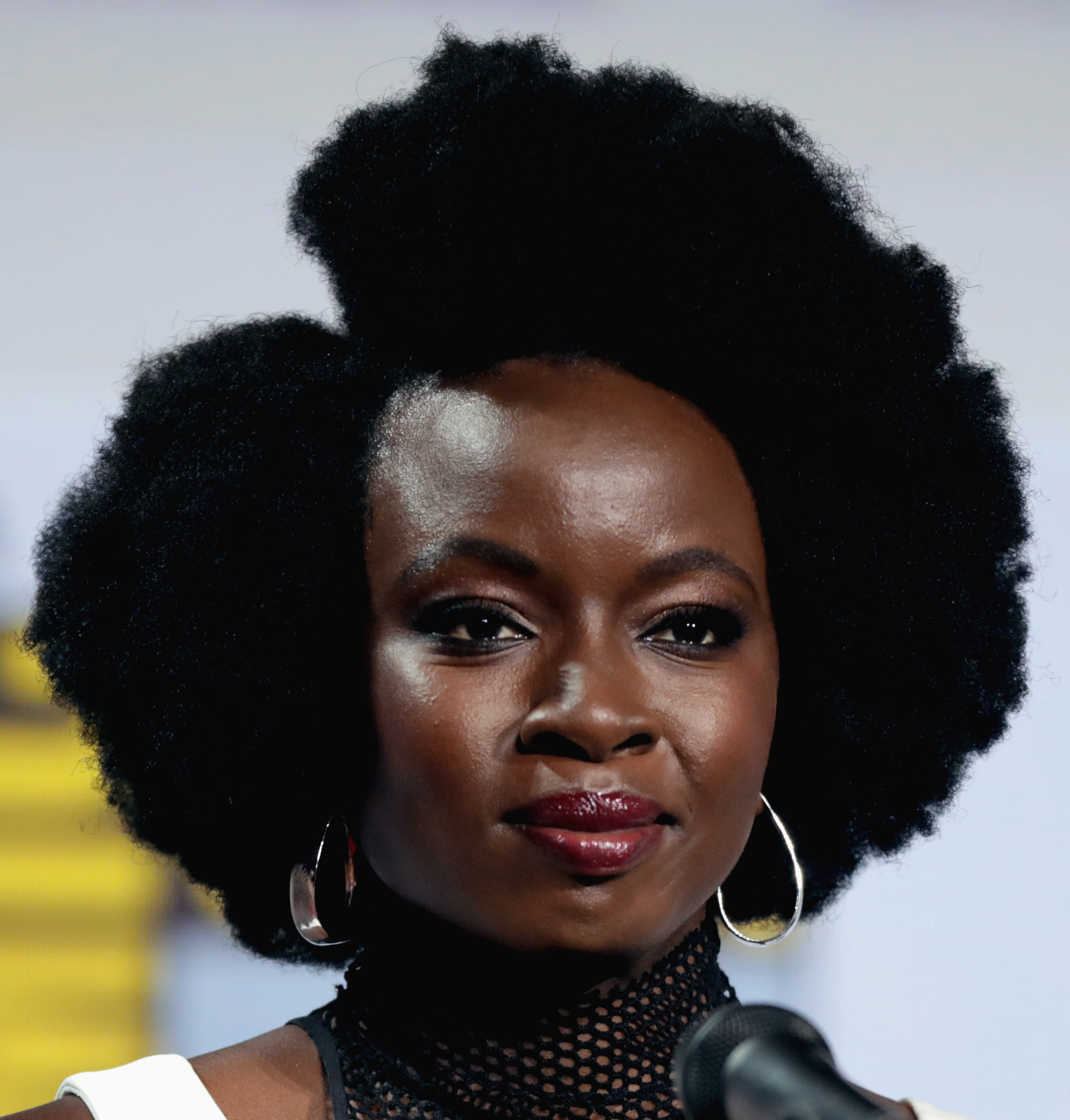
Danai Gurira

Michonne, portrayed by Danai Gurira, is a resourceful and self-sufficient katana-wielding survivor. Michonne met Andrea and began to open up; they developed a close friendship while they survived together. Eventually they met The Governor and were taken to Woodbury. While Andrea was initially smitten with The Governor, Michonne never trusted him or the make-believe world he tried to create. She attempted to join Rick's group, but he did not initially trust her. During the final battle against The Governor at the prison, Michonne saved Rick's life by stabbing The Governor in the chest then leaving him to suffer until Lily ends him.

After that, they coexisted well, all the way to the Alexandria Safe-Zone. The day after Rick captured Paul Rovio (a.k.a. Jesus), he returned home to Alexandria and in the course of a relaxing evening, he and Michonne began a permanent romantic relationship. At the time of Rick's presumed death. she was pregnant with Rick's son R.J. She assumed the position of leader of Alexandria, but due to her frightening encounter with her old college friend Jocelyn, she became exceedingly wary of anyone outside Alexandria for some years, but ultimately was persuaded to reconcile with the Hilltop Colony, the Kingdom, and Oceanside. She is conflicted about Judith's friendship with the still-imprisoned Negan.

=== Hershel Greene ===
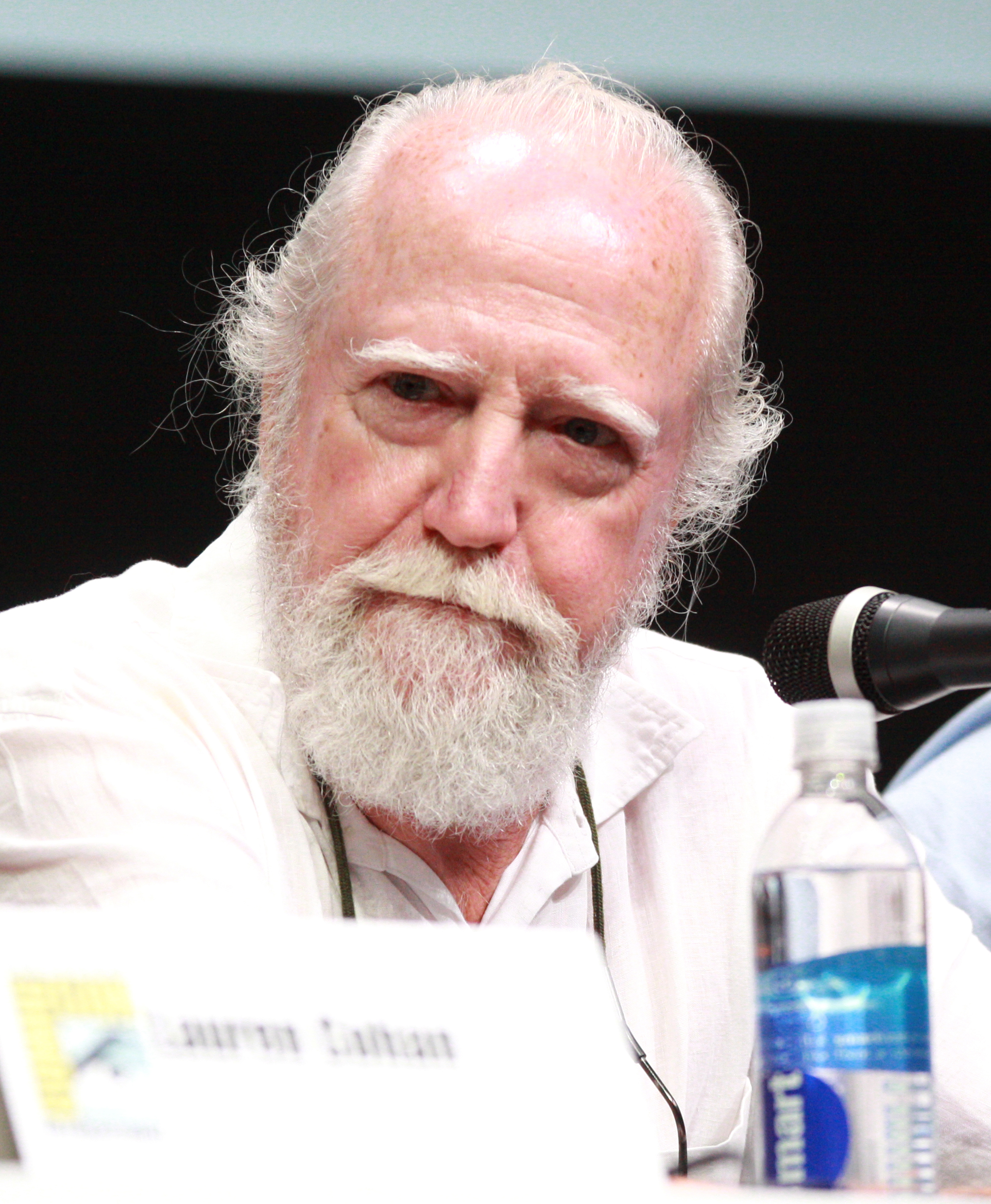
Scott Wilson

Hershel Greene, portrayed by Scott Wilson, is a veterinarian and farmer who lives on his secluded farm for many years with his wife Annette, and his daughters Maggie and Beth, as well as his son Billy from a previous marriage. He grudgingly allows Rick's group to stay at his farm while Carl recovers and while searching for Sophia. It is eventually discovered that Hershel has been keeping his reanimated first wife Josephine, and various friends and neighbors in his barn; he believes that they are simply just sick people needing to be cured.

After the Atlanta refugees eventually discover this, Shane unlocks the doors of the barn and lets the walkers free. The group then kills all the walkers inside as the Greene family watches in horror. Hershel's vision of the world then becomes devastated; however, Rick helps him overcome his trauma. In time, Hershel becomes a mentor to Rick and the moral compass of the group. Before the final battle against The Governor at the prison, Hershel is captured, along with Michonne, and held hostage.

Confronted by The Governor at the prison, Rick pleads for Hershel's life to be spared. The Governor ignores Rick and kills Hershel by beheading him with Michonne's sword as Rick, Maggie, Beth, and the rest of the prison group watches in horror; the battle commences. Sometime after the battle, Hershel's zombified head is found by Michonne and put down.

=== Merle Dixon ===
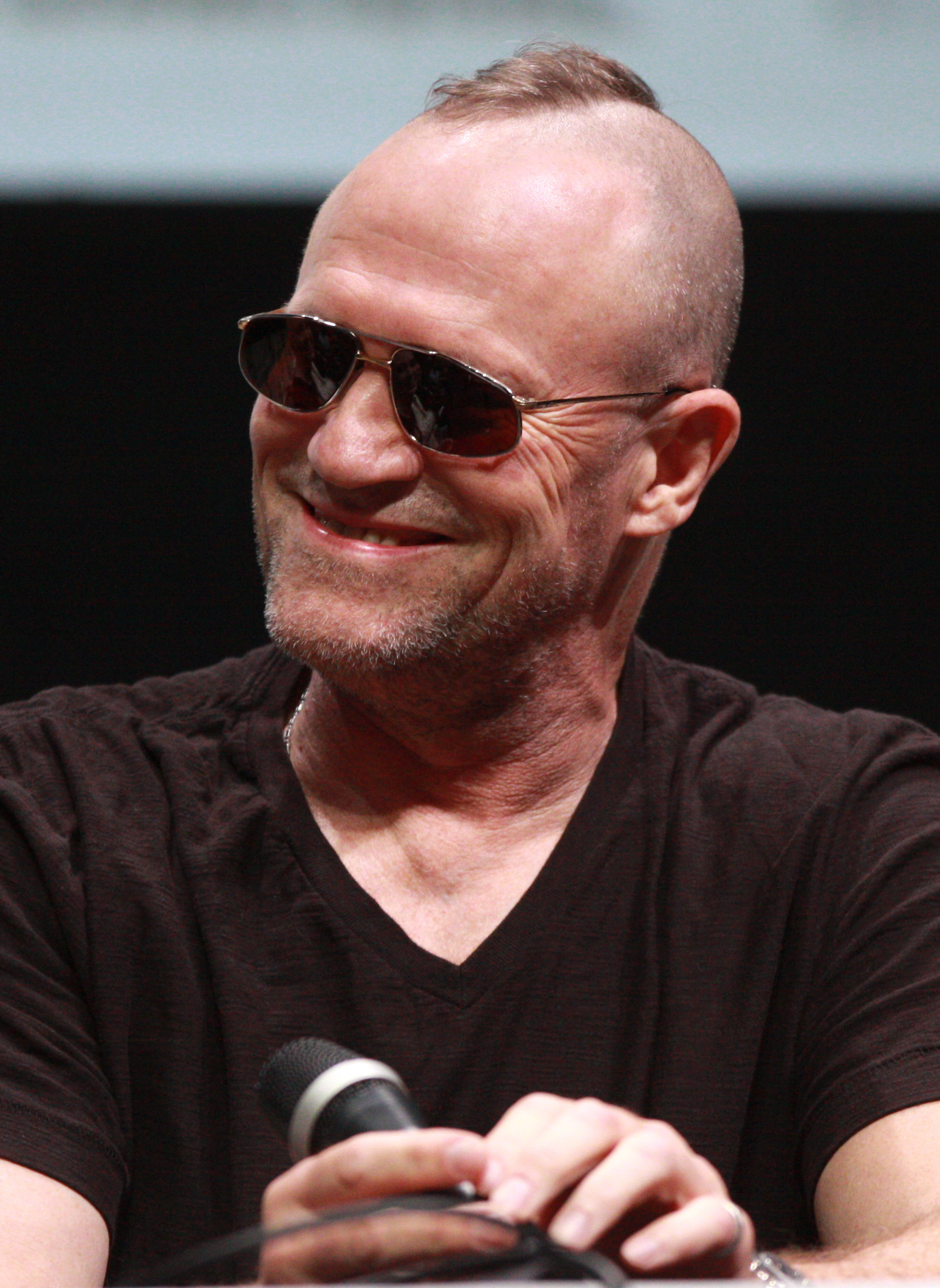
Michael Rooker

Merle Dixon, portrayed by Michael Rooker, is Daryl Dixon's older brother. A racist and misogynist, Merle grew up in an abusive household. His first meeting with Rick quickly escalates to conflict, and Merle is subdued and handcuffed to a pipe, but the keys soon become lost. The group has to leave him there alone, but Rick soon leads a rescue party only to find that Merle has cut himself free and disappeared.

Merle returns in "Walk with Me", alive, one-handed, and residing at Woodbury, a thriving settlement run by the malicious Governor, where Merle serves as his lieutenant and enforcer. He escapes Woodbury with Daryl, but struggles to integrate into the prison.

He attempts to secure peace with The Governor by kidnapping Michonne, but relents and lets her go before returning to Woodbury, luring a pack of walkers to attack in an attempt to assassinate The Governor. He fails and is killed by The Governor, who leaves him to reanimate. Merle is later discovered by Daryl, who violently puts him down while sobbing.

=== The Governor ===
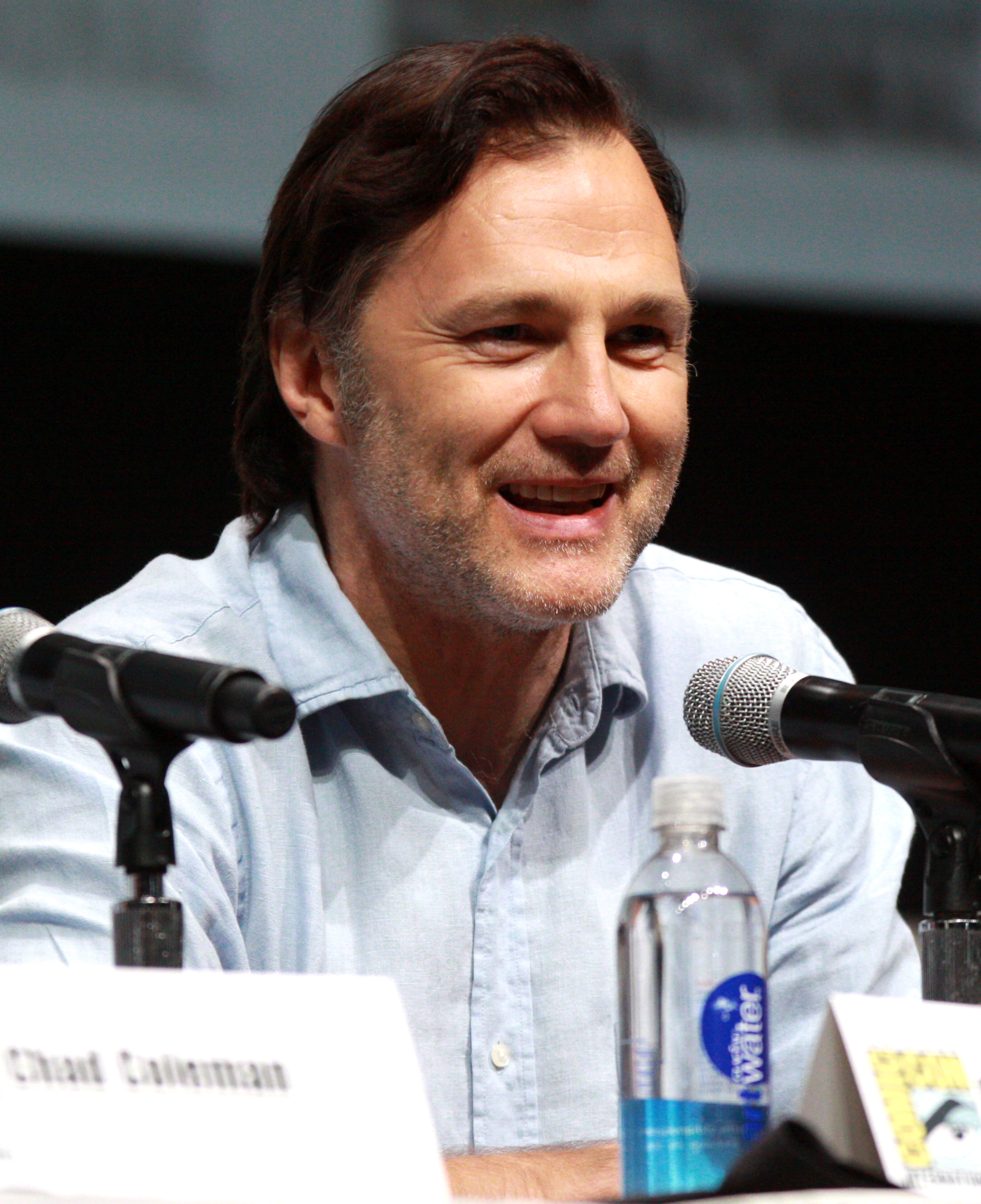
David Morrissey

Philip Blake, better known as The Governor, portrayed by David Morrissey, is the leader of the fortified town of Woodbury and later the new leader of Martinez's Camp. He is shown to be a brutal, callous, cruel, cunning, highly intelligent, megalomaniacal, psychopathic, remorseless, and savage man who is a determined survivor and strong leader to those in his group. The Governor is also a seductive man and willing to kill anyone to secure the necessary supplies to strengthen his city. However, he loses his eye in a brutal confrontation with Michonne, and then begins to wear an eyepatch.

The day after he massacres The Governor's own people following the attempted attack on the prison, he returns to Woodbury and burns it to the ground. The town is then left a burnt-out husk, overrun with walkers, and uninhabitable. After he leaves Woodbury, he goes by his real name—Philip Blake—and briefly by the pseudonym of "Brian Heriot". During the final battle against Rick's group at the prison, just as he is about to kill Rick, he is stabbed in the back by Michonne. Shortly after, he is shot in the head by Lilly, which kills him instantly. Additionally, he has caused the deaths of Axel, Merle, Milton, Andrea, Martinez, and Hershel.

=== Beth Greene ===
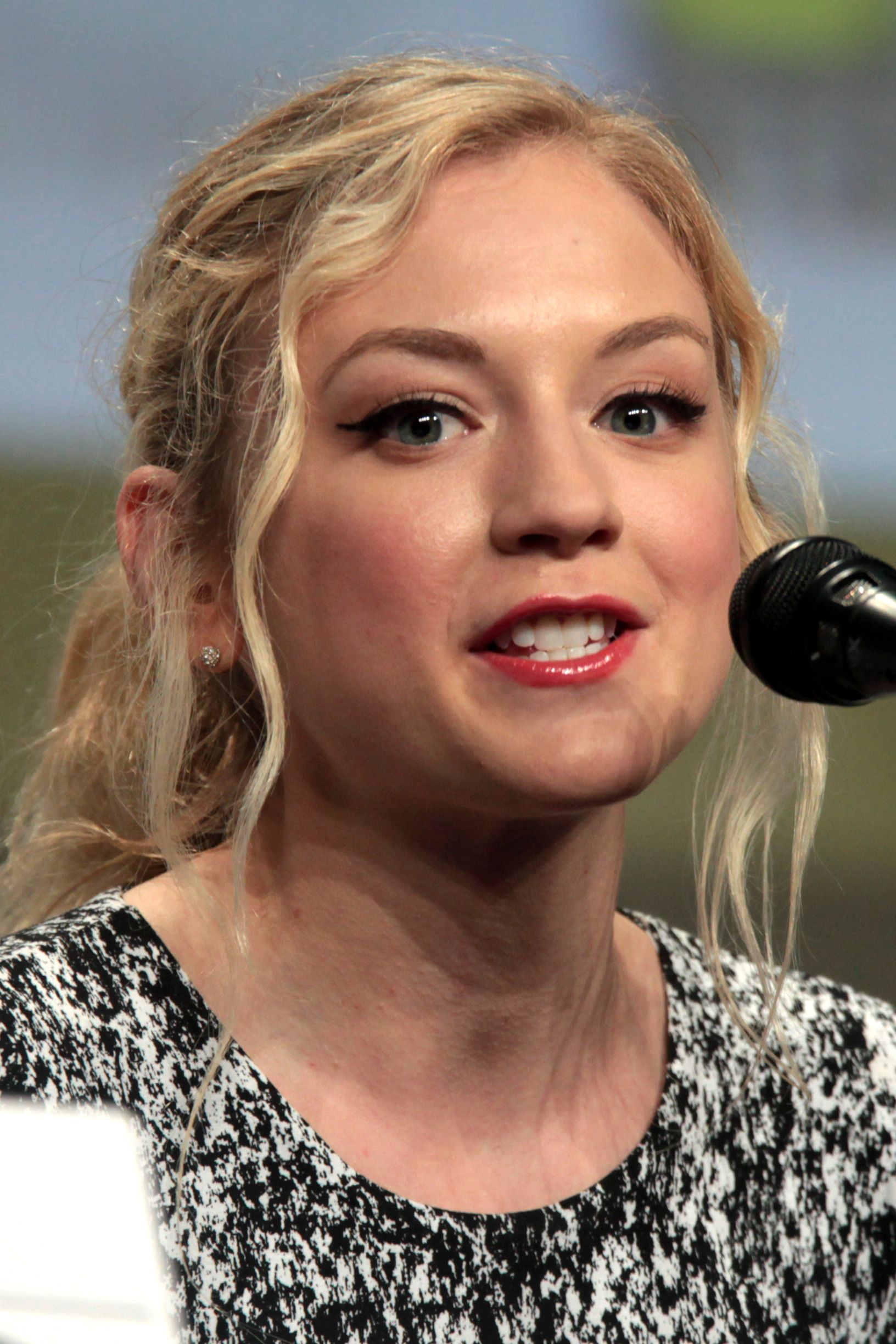
Emily Kinney

Beth Greene, portrayed by Emily Kinney, is the youngest daughter of Annette and Hershel Greene, and the half-sister of Maggie and Shawn.

When first introduced, she is in a relationship with Jimmy, who is another member of Hershel's group. After his death, she later started a relationship at the prison with Zach, who also died. When The Governor returned to the prison, she watched in horror as The Governor beheaded her father; this instantly started the final battle between Rick's group and The Governor's militia. Beth, like the others, was then forced to flee the prison with Daryl, as the whole group became separated during the final showdown.

On the road, she formed a brief bond with Daryl until she was abducted by police officers enlisted in the service under the corrupt Officer Dawn Lerner and forced to remain at the officer's residence—Grady Memorial Hospital. There, she met Noah and became close friends with him. However, when the two attempted to escape together, Beth was caught and Noah had to leave her behind. Soon after, Noah met Daryl, who was searching for Beth with Carol. Daryl then brought Noah to Rick's group at the church where Noah informed them all of Beth's situation.

Rick's group then travels to the hospital where they take two of Dawn's people hostage and exchange them for Beth and Carol, who was also captured while searching for Beth with Daryl. However, when Dawn also requested for Noah, Beth finally understood Dawn and stabbed her with scissors. Dawn then immediately shoots Beth in the head accidentally by reflex, instantly killing her, but protests that she did not mean to kill her. Without hesitation, Daryl immediately pulls out his gun and kills Dawn by shooting her in the head. Outside, as the rest of Rick's group arrive at the hospital, Maggie breaks down as a sobbing Daryl carries Beth's body.

=== Tyreese ===
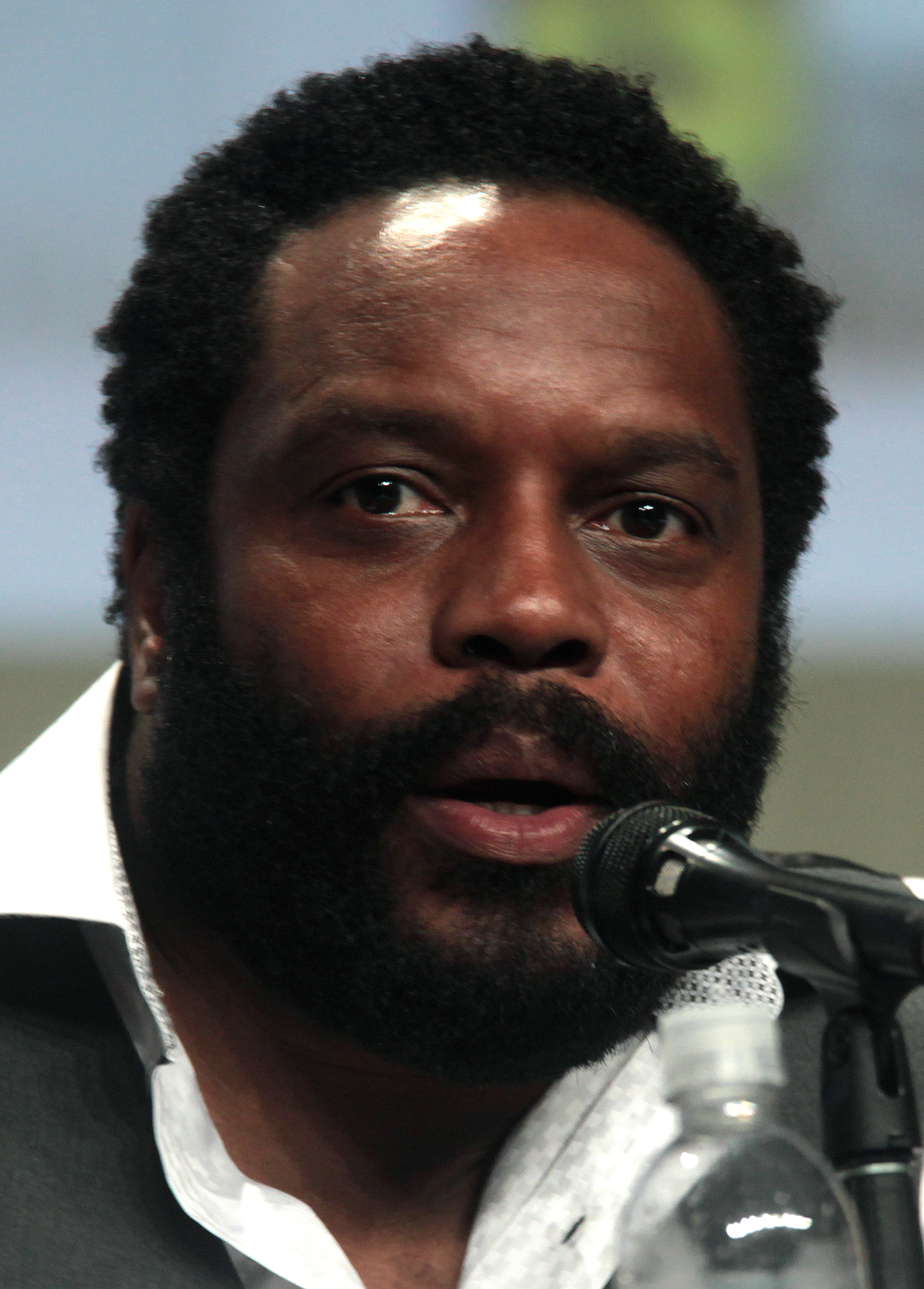
Chad L. Coleman

Tyreese Williams, portrayed by Chad L. Coleman, is the leader of a group from Jacksonville, Florida, which includes his sister Sasha, as well as Allen's family.

During his stay in Woodbury, Karen and Sasha discover the sinister personality of The Governor and upon arriving at the prison, formed a relationship with his surviving Woodbury companion, Karen. After the death of Karen and the fall of the prison, he temporarily becomes the main caretaker of Judith Grimes and Lizzie and Mika Samuels.

When he learned of the death of his partner at the hands of Carol, he forgives her. He goes with Carol to rescue his friends in Terminus and spares the life of a cannibal named Martin who attempts to take the life of the baby Judith. He is bitten on his arm by Noah's zombified brother, which is then amputated by Rick, which causes him to die from loss of blood. Later, Michonne avoids his reanimation.

=== Sasha ===
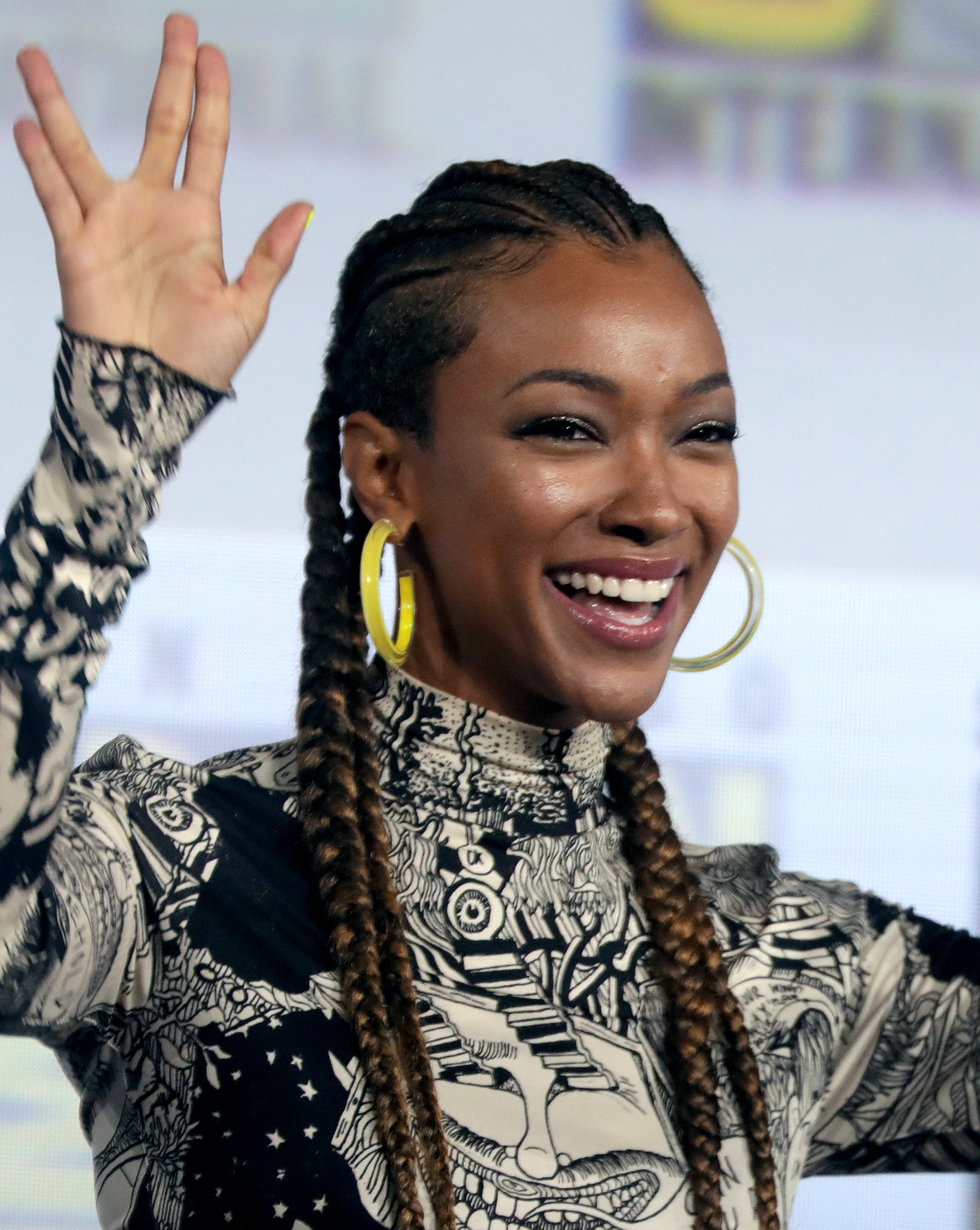
Sonequa Martin-Green

Sasha Williams, portrayed by Sonequa Martin-Green, is a former firefighter from Jacksonville, Florida and Tyreese's young sister. After the fall of the prison, she formed a relationship with, Bob Stookey. After the deaths of Bob and Tyreese, she suffers from severe anguish and post-traumatic stress disorder. She begins to isolate herself, refusing to invest in the Alexandria Safe-Zone; however, she does develop a close friendship with Maggie. She forms a deep and romantic relationship with Abraham Ford in which she and the sergeant share a common experience with post-traumatic stress disorder and suicidal imprudence.

When Abraham is killed by Negan she relocates to the Hilltop Colony, growing closer to Maggie, and befriending Enid and Jesus. During an attempt to get revenge on Negan, Sasha is kidnapped. When he tries to use her as leverage against Rick and the group she commits suicide by taking a cyanide tablet given to her by Eugene Porter; attacking Negan as a walker when he takes her back to Alexandria. Later, Maggie and Jesus find her zombified form wandering around outside Alexandria and put her down.

=== Bob Stookey ===
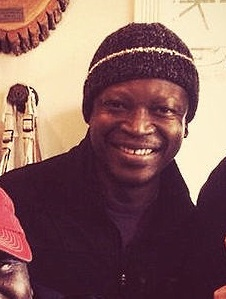
Lawrence Gilliard Jr.

Bob Stookey, portrayed by Lawrence Gilliard Jr., is a former army medic and alcoholic, but struggles to get rid of vice, which causes him problems with the group. As time passes, this develops into an attraction to Sasha with whom he subsequently maintains a loving relationship, in turn Bob has developed a renewed sense of optimism after surviving the fall of the prison. During his stay in the church of Father Gabriel, he leaves with Rick, Michonne and Gabriel on a food run, but is bitten by a walker. After a banquet, he leaves the church and starts crying when he is suddenly kidnapped by the Hunters of Terminus.

After being knocked out, he awakens to discovers his leg is being cannibalized. He laughs and hysterically mocks them, saying that he is "tainted meat" and shows them his bitten shoulder. In response, the Hunters savagely beat him and leave him outside the church. Soon after, the group murders all the Hunters as revenge for Bob and previous matters. He dies the following morning with Tyreese stabbing him in the head to prevent reanimation as Sasha cannot bring herself to do it.

=== Abraham Ford ===
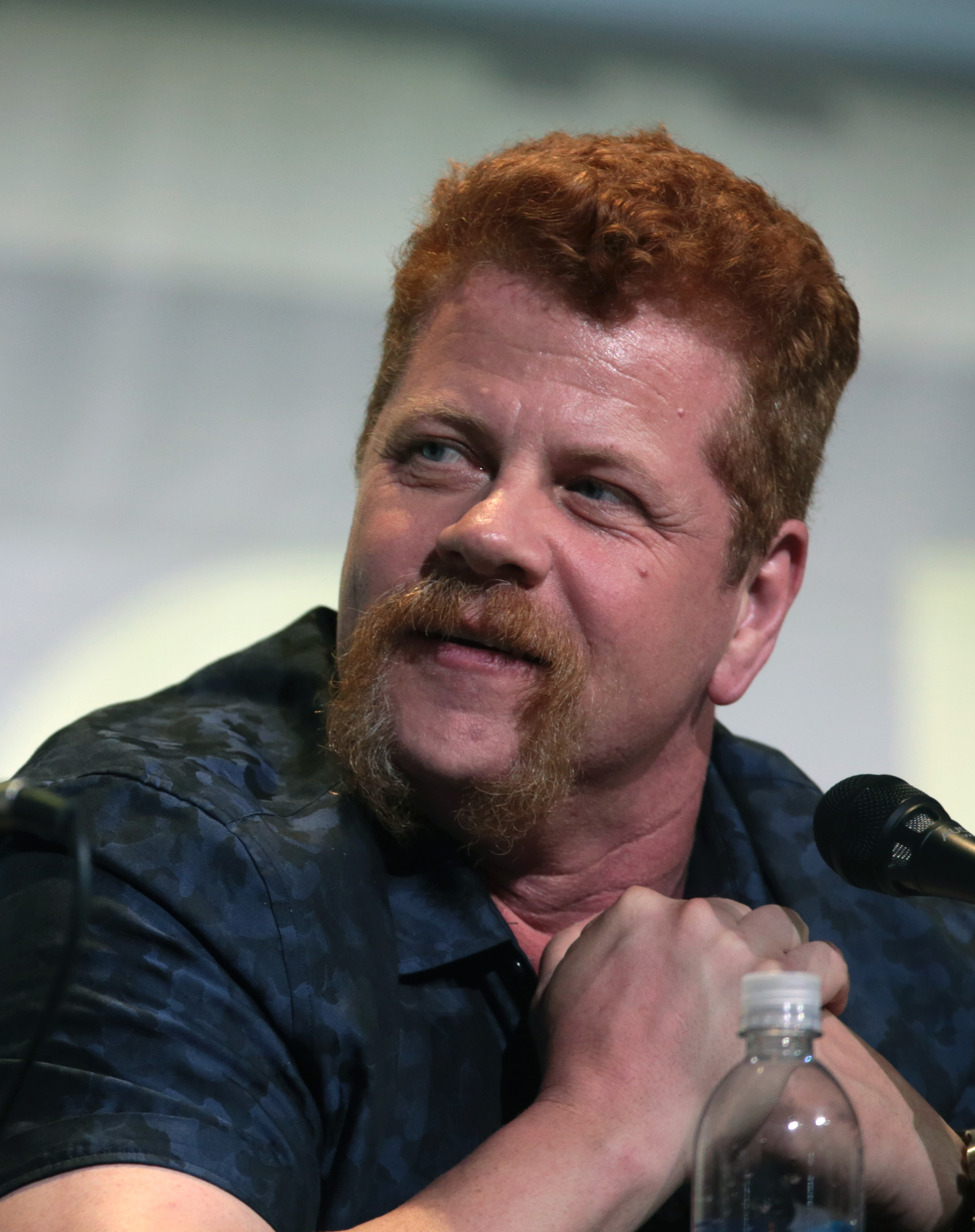
Michael Cudlitz

Sgt. Abraham Alexander Ford, portrayed by Michael Cudlitz, is a survivor and former member of the military who has a relationship with Rosita. Before meeting Eugene, he had a family who ran away after seeing him kill a group that threatened their safety. After his family was killed by walkers, Abraham attempted suicide, but Eugene arrived at the same moment, stopping him from doing so. His mission has become attempting to deliver Eugene to Washington, D.C., believing he has the answer to the cause and cure of the walker plague.

Upon discovering that Eugene was lying, he nearly beats Eugene to death. During his stay at the Alexandria Safe-Zone, he reconciles with Eugene and assumes the position of community construction leader, ends with Rosita and begins a deep relationship with Sasha. However, he is brutally murdered by Negan, who repeatedly clubbed him in the head with his barbed wired baseball bat he calls "Lucille". Abraham's remains are then taken by Sasha and Maggie to the Hilltop Colony, where he and Glenn are buried together

=== Eugene Porter ===
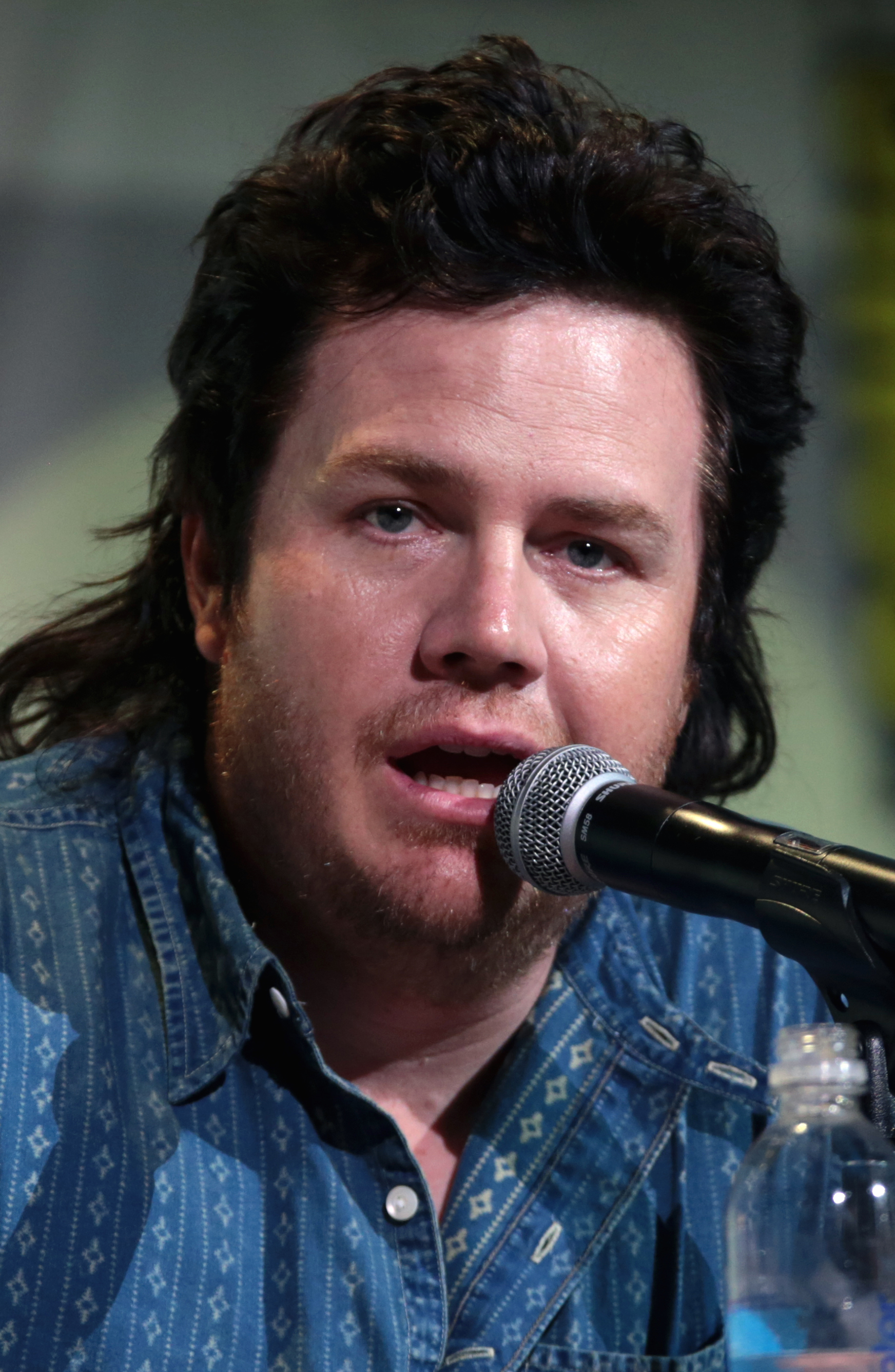
Josh McDermitt

Eugene Hermann Porter, portrayed by Josh McDermitt, is a survivor and member of Abraham Ford's group. He is often portrayed as a cowardly but very intelligent man. When introduced, he was pretending to be a scientist claiming to know how to cure the walker virus, and that he was being taken to Washington D.C. so he could combat it. In truth, he believed Washington to be heavily fortified, and he would therefore be safe there. When he finally admits his lie, he is beaten by Abraham and loses trust within the group, though he is eventually forgiven upon reaching the Alexandria Safe-Zone.

During Negan's rule, he is taken to the Sanctuary and made one of Negan's lieutenants, due to his knowledge of creating ammunition. Eugene abused this trust to turn on Negan in a crucial showdown, saving his friends and forcing the Saviors' surrender. Months after Negan's defeat, Eugene becomes crucial in helping advance and develop the communities. Six years after Rick's supposed death at the destruction of the bridge, a much more capable and confident Eugene becomes one of the first members of the group to encounter The Whisperers.

During the war against The Whisperers, Eugene communicates on the radio with a strange woman who invites him to her distant community. He prepares to go with Yumiko and Ezekiel, and on the way, they meet Princess, who joins them on their journey. Both arrive at the place where they were to be seen but suddenly they are captured by some soldiers in white armor.

=== Rosita Espinosa ===
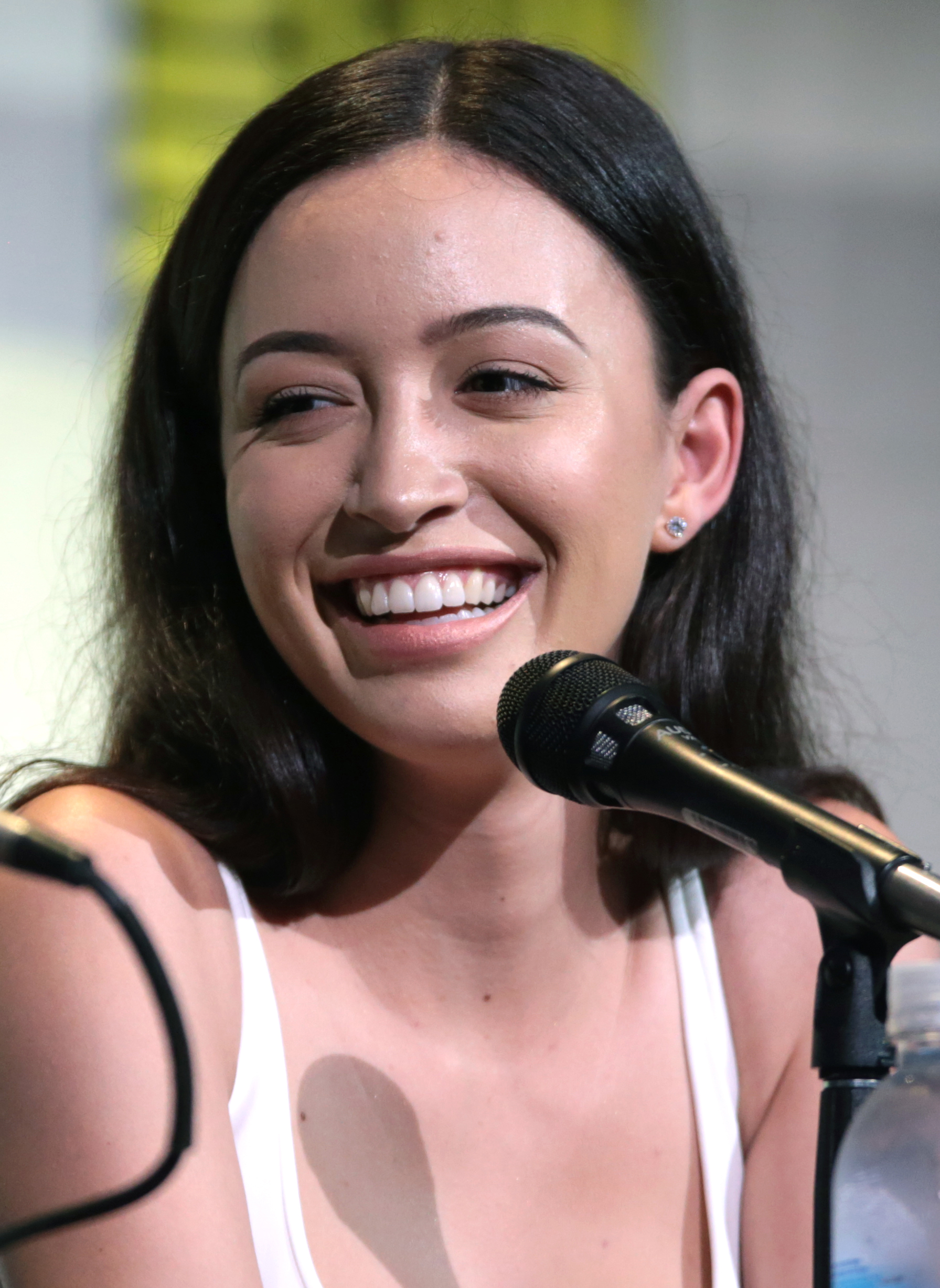
Christian Serratos

Rosita Espinosa, portrayed by Christian Serratos, is an optimistic and pragmatic survivor, and a member of Abraham Ford's group. Initially, she is in a relationship with Abraham; however, he eventually leaves her for Sasha. She rebounds by sleeping with Spencer, though it is clear she does not care much for him. Within the group, she grows close to Tara, Glenn, and Eugene. When both Abraham and Spencer die at the hands of Negan, she swears revenge upon him; however, she begins to reconsider her decision after Sasha sacrifices herself. Six years after Rick's supposed death at the destruction of the bridge, she starts a relationship with Gabriel. However, it is eventually revealed that she got pregnant by Siddiq, whom she had been casually sleeping with before falling for Gabriel.

=== Tara Chambler ===
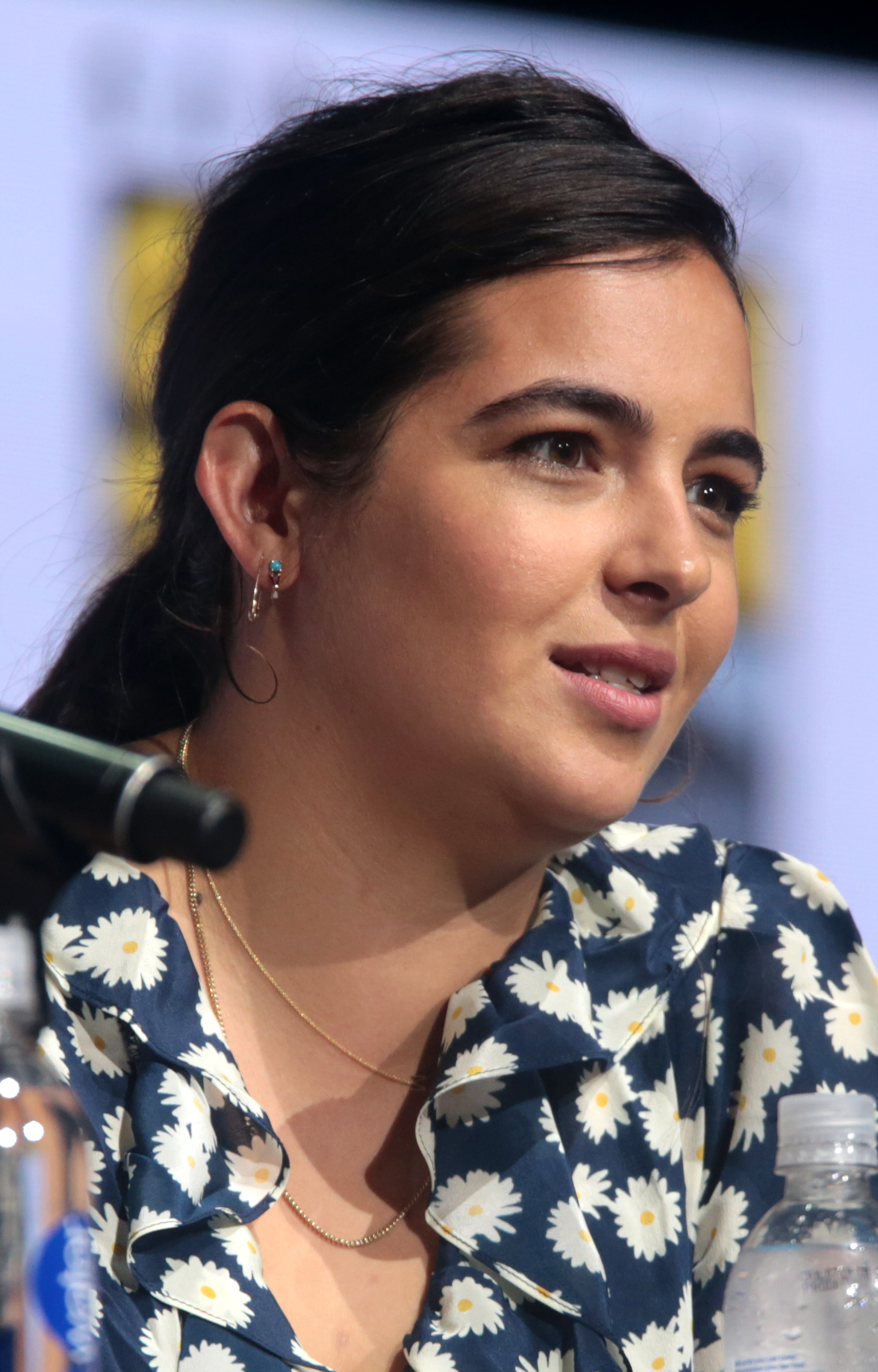
Alanna Masterson

Tara Chambler, portrayed by Alanna Masterson, is a former police academy student who holes up in an apartment complex with her remaining family—her sister Lilly, her dying father David, and her niece Meghan. She is a lesbian and characterized by being optimistic, affectionate, and very overprotective with those around her. Tara welcomes The Governor (under the pseudonym of "Brian Heriot") into her apartment and was with him to attack the prison.

After The Governor kills Hershel, Tara immediately realizes his true personality. After the fall of the prison, Tara helps Glenn to seek for Maggie. After the couple reunites, she then joins Abraham's group. When the group meets up again with Rick and company, Tara is well received in the group. When she arrives at the Alexandria Safe-Zone, she is given the position of supply runner. She forms a great bond with Eugene, Glenn and Rosita, who were with her when she was seriously injured during a supply run.

Her participation in the war against the Saviors was very important. After the war, Tara moves to the Hilltop Colony and becomes the right-hand of Jesus after Maggie departs to join Georgie's group. After Jesus is killed by a Whisperer, Tara takes over the leadership role, but is eventually killed by Alpha. It is later revealed that she was decapitated with her head appearing on a spike.

=== Gareth ===
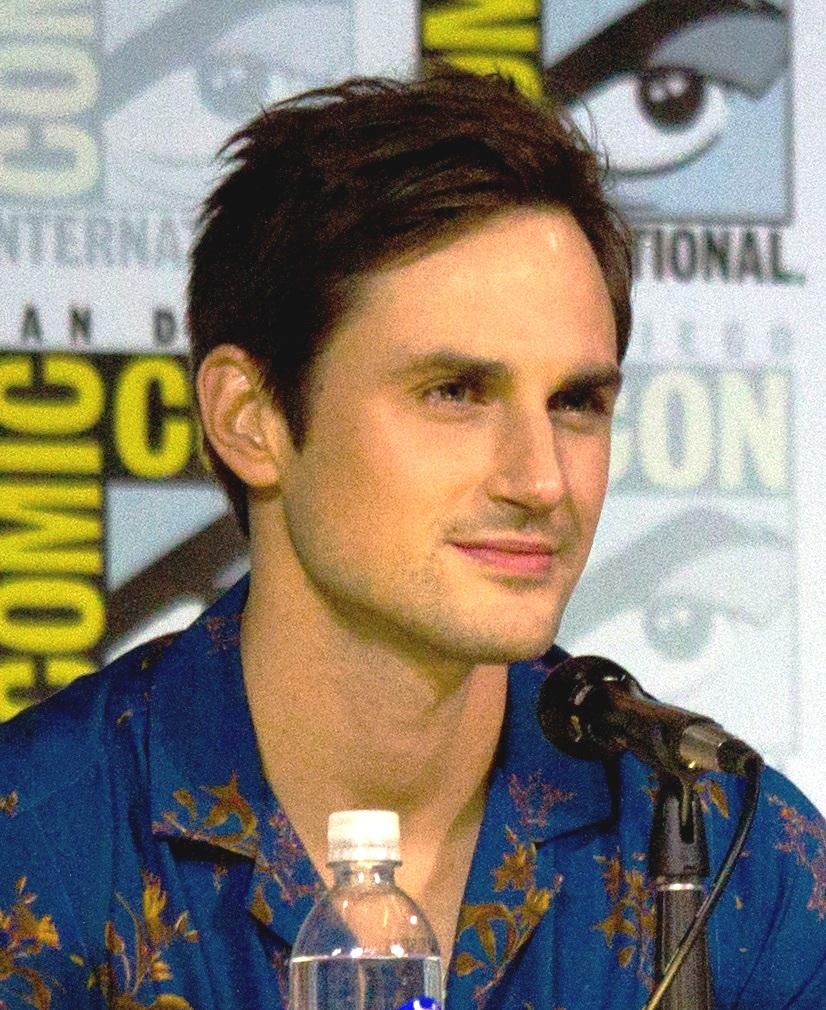
Andrew J. West

Gareth, portrayed by Andrew J. West, is the leader of a supposed safe-zone, Terminus, which he runs along with his younger brother, Alex, and his mother, Mary. He explains that Terminus initially was a safe and welcoming place, a sanctuary for all who wanted to come in, before a group of marauders took over and began ruthlessly beating and raping the other survivors. Gareth and his family had to take Terminus back by force, and decided that from then on, they would run Terminus in a similarly brutal manner by capturing, killing, and eating all those who were lured in by the various signs posted in the area.

Just before Gareth and his butchers can kill Rick, Daryl, Glenn, and Bob, Carol begins her siege on Terminus by blowing up the propane tank outside, blasting open the fences and allowing walkers to flow in. Though Terminus is destroyed and a majority of the survivors, including Alex and Mary, are killed, Gareth manages to survive and escape, along with five others, and become known as The Hunters. Later the Hunters kidnap Bob and eat one of his legs, but when he reveals that he is infected, they savagely beat him and leave him outside Father Gabriel's church, where Rick's group has taken residence. They then attempt to lead a siege against the church in "Four Walls and a Roof", only to be outsmarted and overpowered by Rick's group. Although Gareth initially pleads for his life, Rick refuses and brutally kills him with a red-handled machete (as per a promise Rick made to Gareth in Terminus).

=== Gabriel Stokes ===
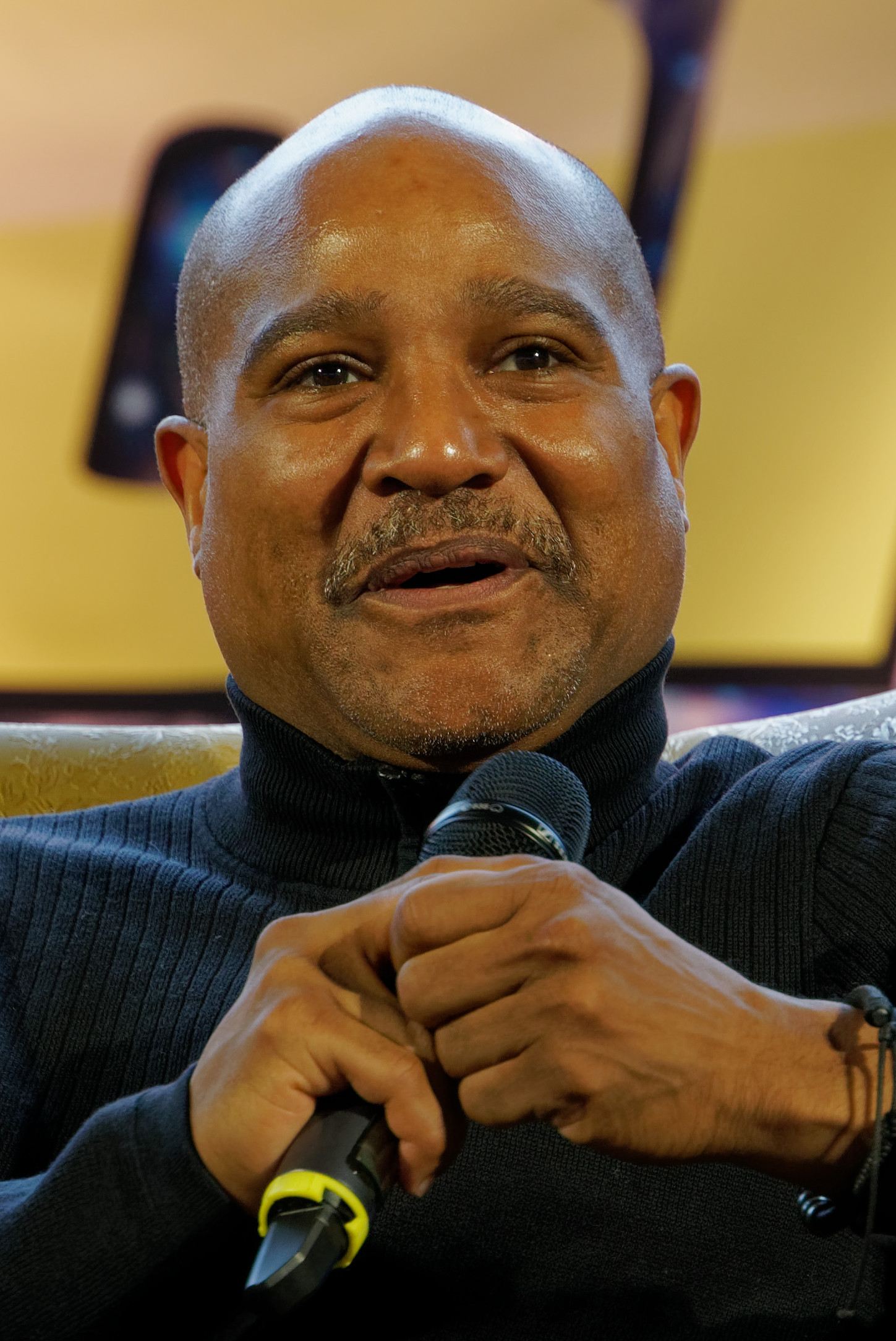
Seth Gilliam

Father Gabriel Stokes, portrayed by Seth Gilliam, is a priest at a small parish church outside Atlanta. He barricaded himself within his church for many months, denying his parishioners entry, and was tormented by his guilt until joining Rick's group. Since then, he has often struggled with trust issues and the nature of humanity in this new world, but over time Gabriel becomes a very important friend to many in the group, offering advice and wisdom to those in need. At the beginning of the war, he found himself trapped alone with Negan inside a trailer house at the Sanctuary where he was able to cut through Negan's bravado and get him to open up for the first time.

He was subsequently kept captive by the Saviors and ended up becoming blind in his right eye after an infection went untreated. After the fall of Negan, he forms a brief romance with Jadis before her disappearance. Six years after Rick's supposed death at the destruction of the bridge, he has become head of the Alexandria Council and started a relationship with Rosita, and watches over the imprisoned Negan. Besides cleaning the prison cell and continuously try to meditate with Negan, Gabriel hopes that there is some humanity inside of Negan. However, when Negan continues to make fun of Gabriel, he snaps and tells him off, to which Negan apologizes for.

=== Morgan Jones ===
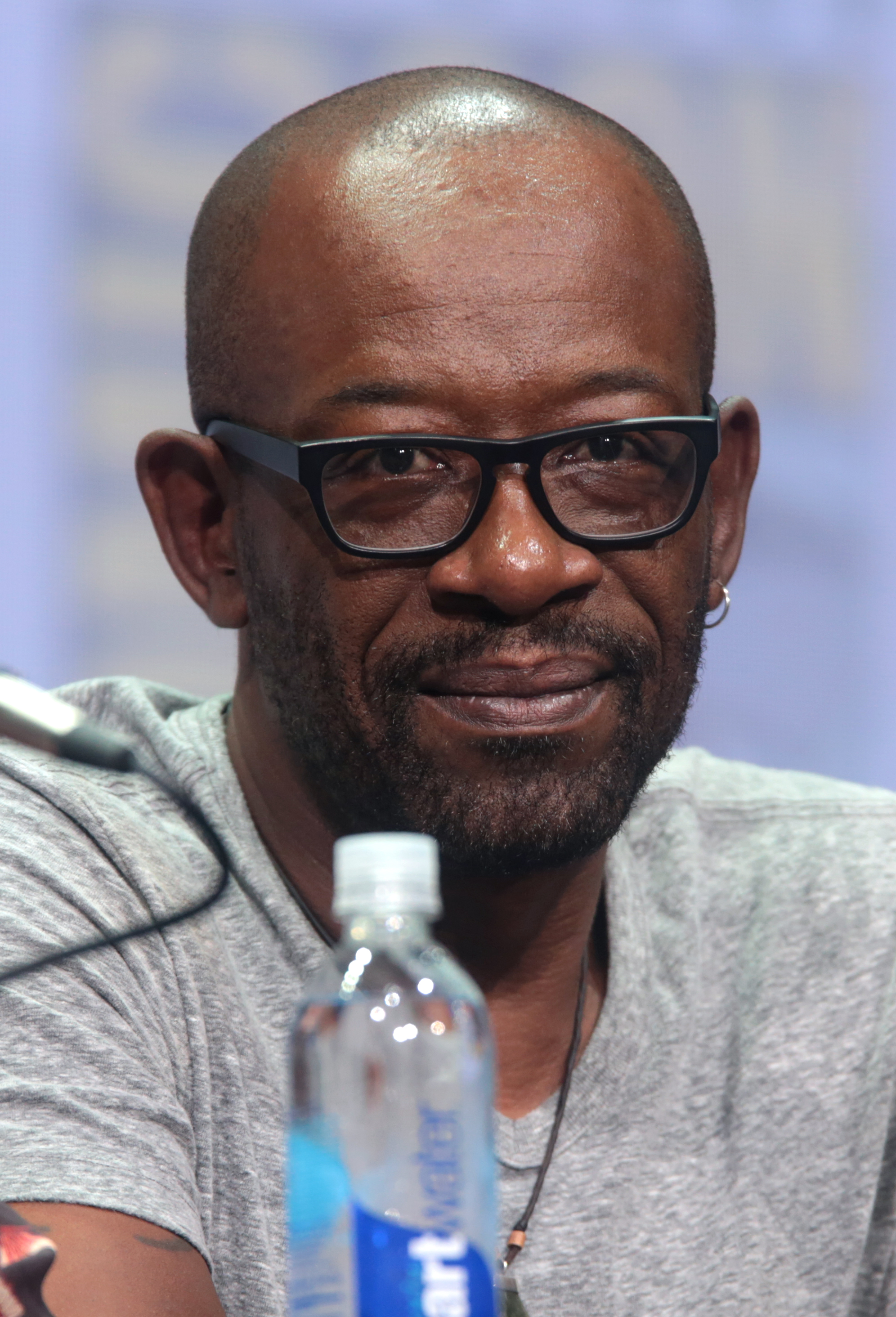
Lennie James

Morgan Jones, portrayed by Lennie James, is a survivor staying in Rick's hometown with his son, Duane. Initially, he suffers from the loss of his wife Jenny at the beginning of the outbreak, unwilling to move on while her reanimated body roamed the town. He helps Rick recover after he wakes from his coma, and promises to contact him over radio as Rick continued towards Atlanta. Later, Morgan could not take action to prevent walker Jenny from biting Duane, and he becomes obsessed with clearing walkers from the town. Rick meets him again while scavenging for supplies, and asks him to join them, but Morgan refuses.

After he accidentally burned down his home in a fit, Morgan takes to following Rick and eventually encounters a former prison psychologist named Eastman, who helps Morgan find inner peace through the use of aikido. This not only gives Morgan a new mode of self-defense, but also imparts a new dedication to respecting the value of human life. Morgan follows Rick's group from Terminus to the Alexandria Safe-Zone, where he finds their violent ways, particularly of Carol's, distressing and tries to help show them a better way to deal with the humans that want to harm them.

After being asked to locate a missing Carol and becoming a part of the Kingdom, Morgan finally comes to the realization that you have to kill sometimes, and kills Richard in a rage. Morgan helps in the fight against the Saviors and Scavengers, but the violence and the familiar feeling of instability become too much for him, and he once again leaves to be on his own, which leads him to Fear the Walking Dead.

=== Jessie Anderson ===
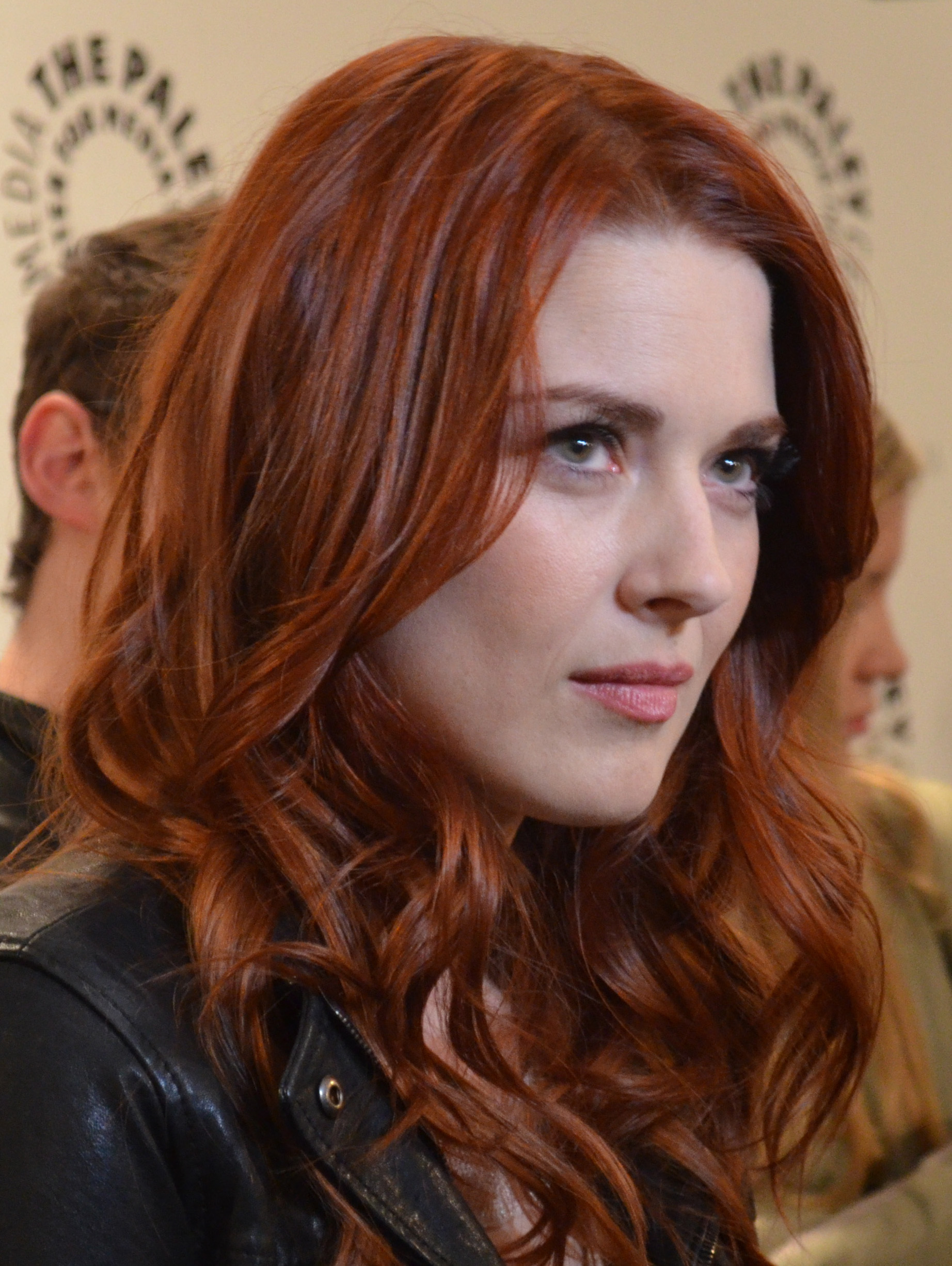
Alexandra Breckenridge

Jessie Anderson, portrayed by Alexandra Breckenridge, is an Alexandria Safe-Zone resident who is married to Pete, and mother to Ron and Sam. She mentions to Rick that she is a former stylist and gives him a long overdue haircut, where it is apparent that the two have a romantic chemistry. It comes to light that Jessie is abused by Pete leading Rick to intervene, which leads to a violent fight between the two men. After Rick is given permission to execute Pete by Deanna for unintentionally killing Reg, Jessie decides to step up in the community and learns to shoot. When the Wolves attack, Jessie is tackled by one of their women and brutally stabs her repeatedly.

She then tries to convince the other Alexandrians that they can be courageous and accept the harsh realities outside the walls, and begins a relationship with Rick. When a gargantuan herd breaks into Alexandria, Sam panics during the escape attempt and is devoured in front of her. In shock, Jessie freezes and a group of walkers begin to rip at her, but continues to grip tightly onto Carl's hand. An emotional Rick is then forced to chop off her arm so that she does not pull Carl into the herd with her as well. The next day, she and her sons are buried together at Alexandria once the herd is destroyed.

=== Aaron ===
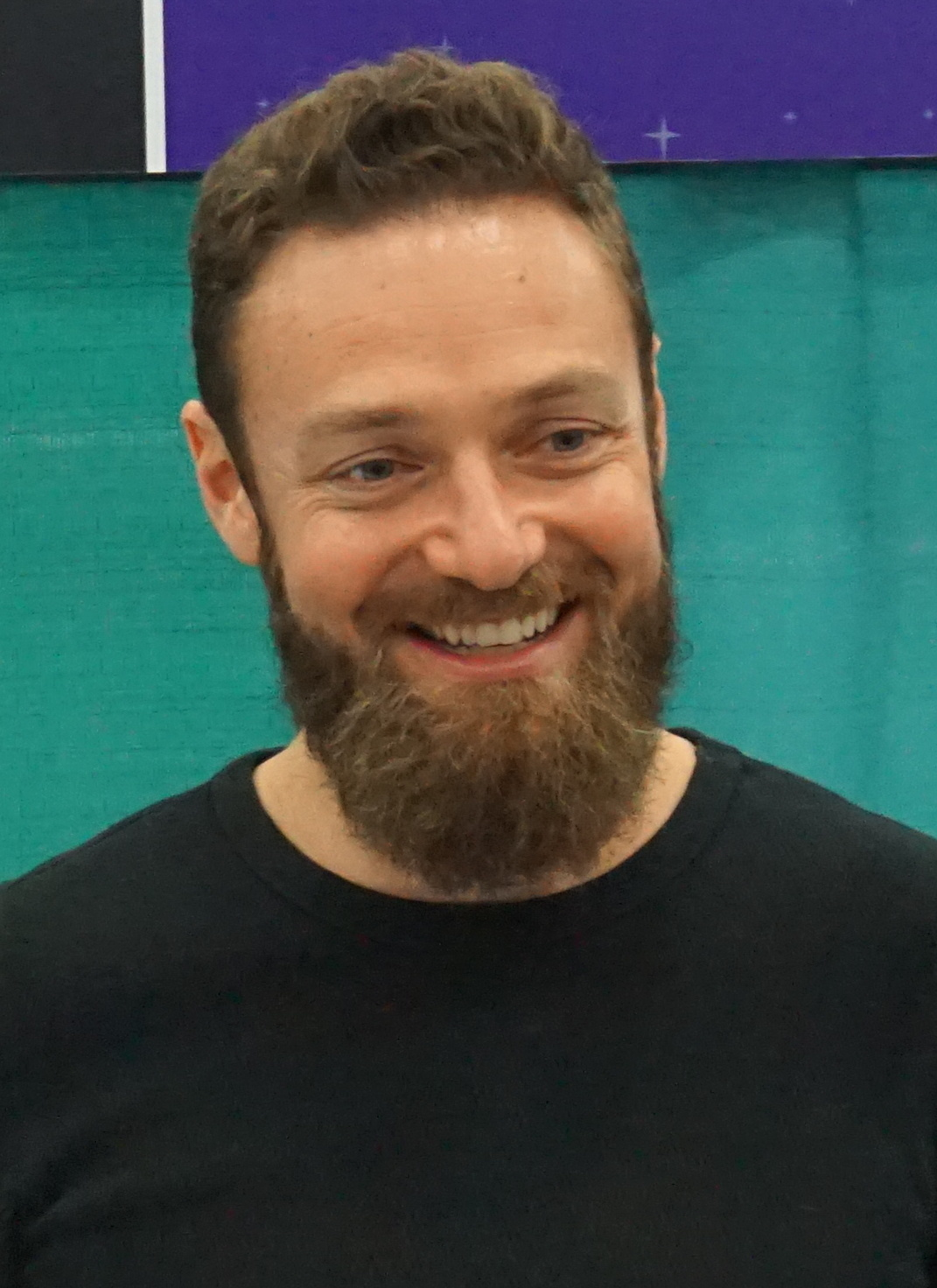
Ross Marquand

Aaron, portrayed by Ross Marquand, is a recruiter for the Alexandria Safe-Zone who generally has a cheerful and outgoing personality. He is gay and maintains a relationship with Eric Raeligh with whom he traveled with to recruit Rick's group. Despite losing Eric during the early stages in the war against the Saviors, Aaron continued to be an important element in defeating Negan and his followers. After the war, Aaron develops an intimate friendship with Jesus and helps construct a bridge. During an accident caused by rebellious Saviors, Aaron loses his left arm.

=== Spencer Monroe ===
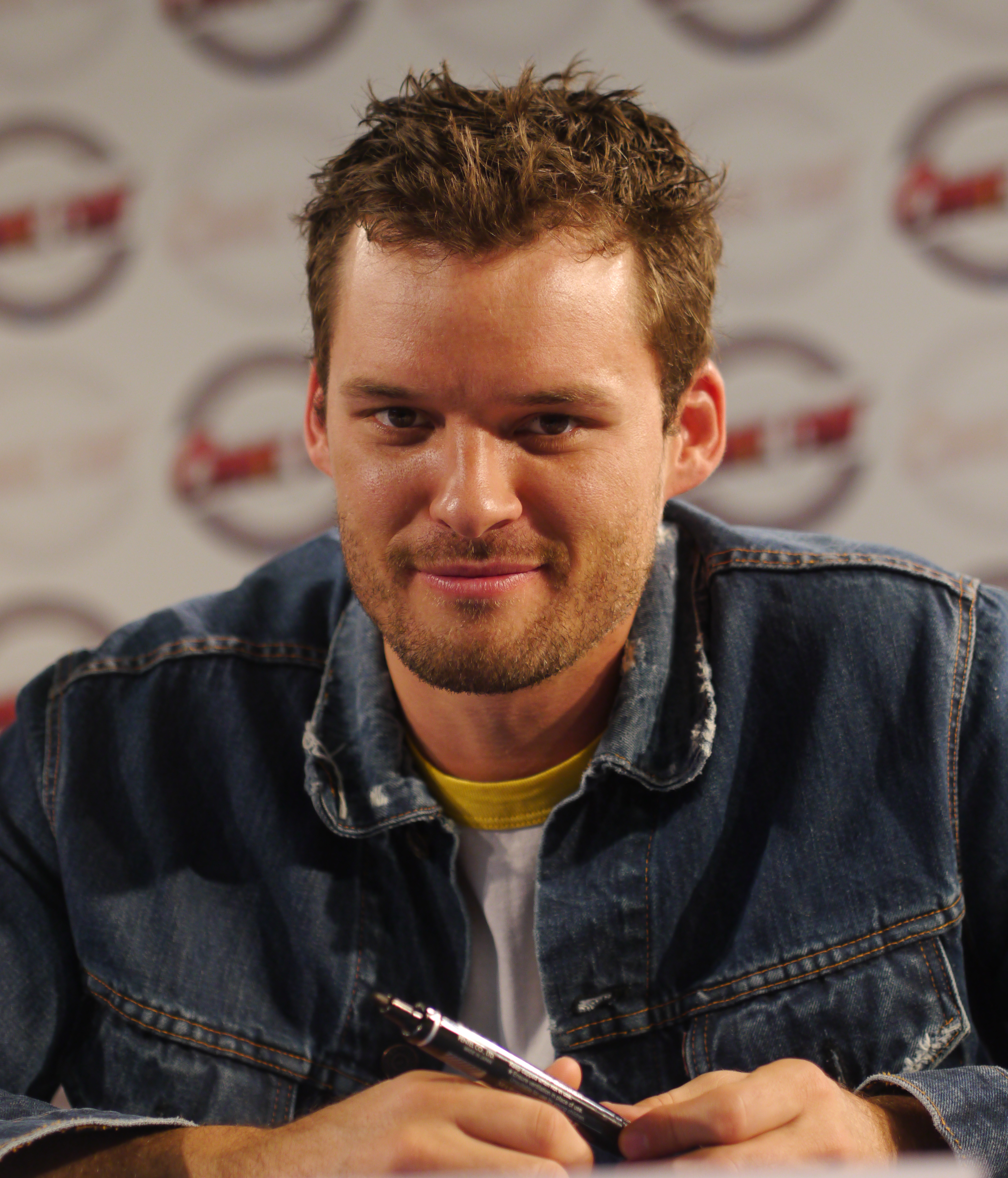
Austin Nichols

Spencer Monroe, portrayed by Austin Nichols, is a resident of the Alexandria Safe-Zone and son of Reg and Deanna Monroe and brother of Aiden. When Rosita ends with Abraham, she has sex with him, develops a quarrel with Rick for the death of his family and how he has handled himself with the Saviors. He tried to prove himself to the Saviors by going out alone to collect supplies, but when he reveals to Negan his desire to overthrow Rick, Negan notices how cowardly Spencer truly is. Negan doubts that Spencer has any "guts" and slashes him across the stomach, allowing his intestines to spill out before he dies, in front of the whole community. He is left to reanimate and Rick puts him down.

=== Deanna Monroe ===
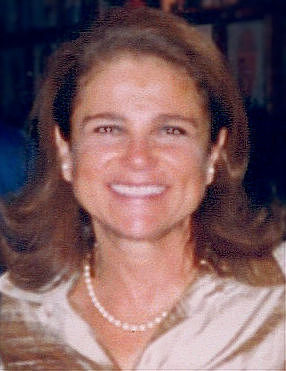
Tovah Feldshuh

Deanna Monroe, portrayed by Tovah Feldshuh, is a former Congresswoman and the leader of the Alexandria Safe-Zone, mother of Aiden and Spencer Monroe and the wife of Reg. Rick made her see how weak the community was, she finally realizes that Rick is a great element for the community. When Pete assassinates Reg, she orders Rick to eliminate him and the latter kills him, being devastated by the death of her husband. She passes part of her leadership to Rick and before dying she declares him leader. During the invasion walker in Alexandria she is bitten by a walker and later Spencer finishes it after reanimation.

=== Negan ===
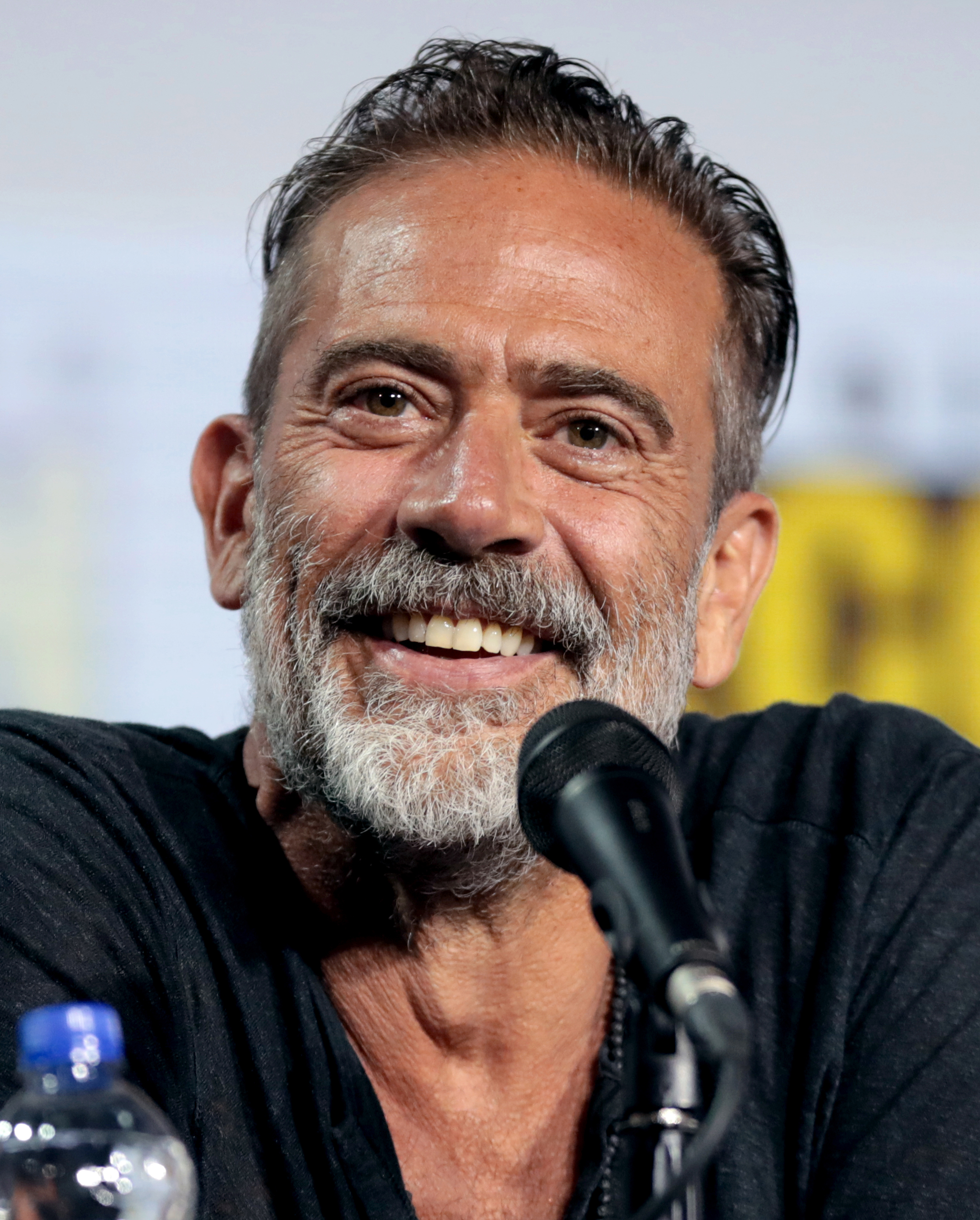
Jeffrey Dean Morgan

Negan Smith, or better known as simply Negan, portrayed by Jeffrey Dean Morgan, is a totalitarian and manipulative dictator who made his first appearance in the sixth-season finale. He is the sociopathic and merciless leader of a vast organization of hostile survivors called the Saviors that he rules with tyranny. Negan has gathered together strong survivors and leads them in terrorizing nearby survivor communities in exchange for food and supplies. He sets out for revenge against Rick's group after they kill a lot of Negan's people at a Savior outpost.

Eventually, Negan and a large portion of his people follow and ambush the group during their trip to the Hilltop. After cornering and introducing himself to Rick's group, Negan brutally murders Glenn and Abraham with a baseball bat wrapped in barbed wire he calls "Lucille", named after his late wife. Afterwards, Negan takes a portion of Alexandria's supplies so that he does not have to kill any more of their residents, but still murders Olivia and Spencer. Rick then plans a rebellion against the Saviors.

Negan is notable for using excessive profanity when he speaks, even to his own people, despite having everything he has always wanted to maintain a balance with his people. He proved it when he had to end the life of his right-hand man, Simon, who betrayed him and became a threat to Negan and his people, and the resources for the Saviors as the war against the Militia progressed. During the final battle, Negan is defeated and then kept as a prisoner in Alexandria. Over the years, Negan's antagonism diminishes and his mental stability improves as he forms a bond with Judith.

Several months after the fair massacre, Negan suggests to Michonne that in a conflict no one is able to admit that they are the evil ones in the situation, indicating reflection and possibly remorse for his past actions. In the midst of the Whisperer War, Negan escapes from his cell and joins The Whisperers, and manages to gain Alpha's trust and affection. Eventually, Negan kills her by slitting her throat and bringing her severed head to Carol with whom he had been working with the whole time. Later, he manages to save Daryl, who was held captive by three Whisperers, in order to prove his loyalty to Alexandria.

=== Dwight ===
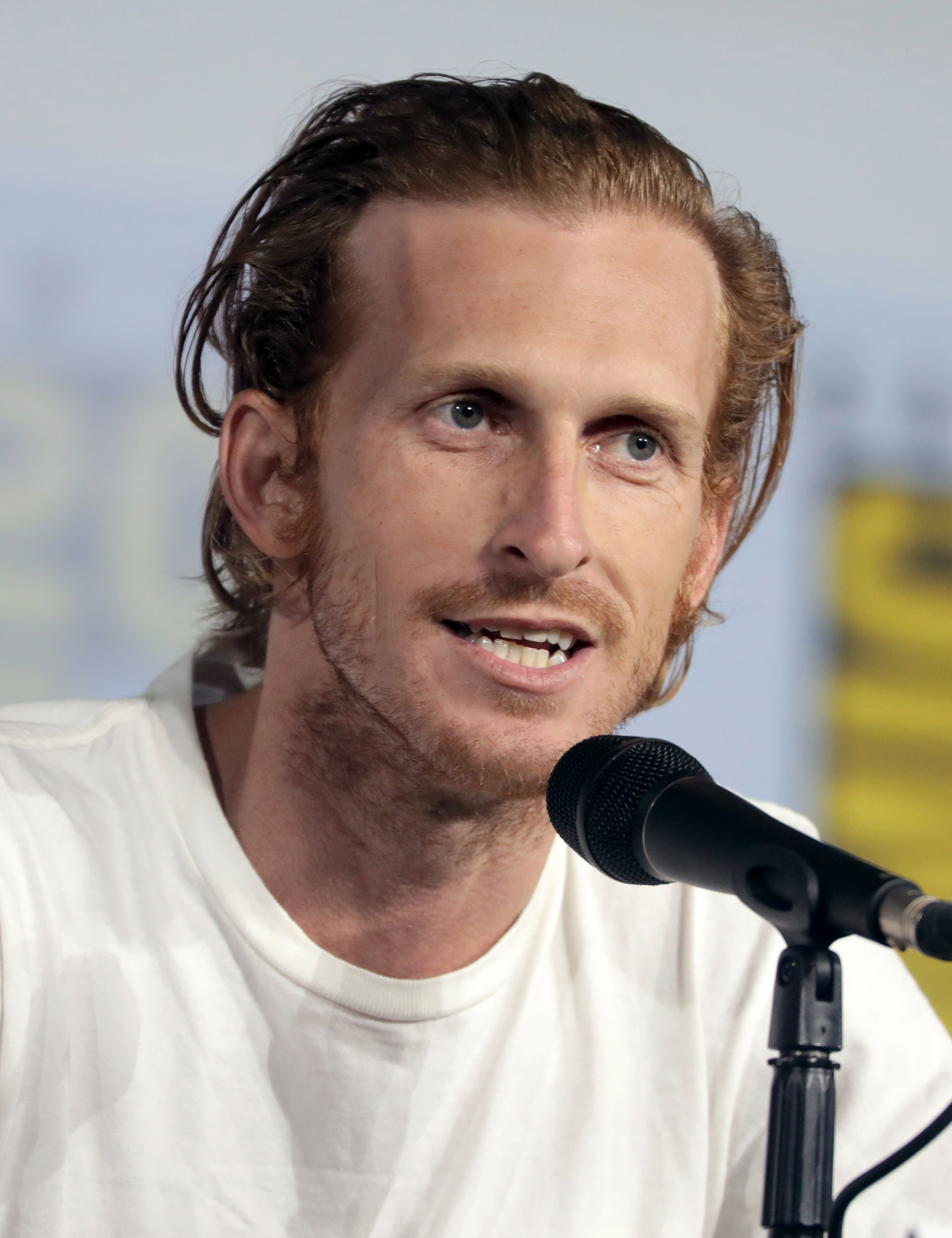
Austin Amelio

Dwight, portrayed by Austin Amelio, is a ruthless but reluctant member of the Saviors who forms a hostile rivalry with Daryl. In "Twice as Far", he reappears with a captive Eugene and murders Denise where you see half of his face burned. He tries to subjugate Daryl and Rosita, but they are saved by Abraham and Eugene who bites his crotch. Dwight acquires the rank of lieutenant within the group of the Saviors. After the deaths of Glenn and Abraham, Dwight is commissioned to keep Daryl imprisoned by orders of Negan. His wife Sherry helps him escape and his wife escapes from the Sanctuary to an unknown location.

This causes Dwight forms quite a grudge against Negan which reveals that Negan burned his face when he left the Sanctuary. For these reasons, he forms an alliance with Rick, working as a double agent in the war against the Saviors. After Negan's defeat, Daryl expels him and threatens to kill him if he sees him again. He accepts the decision and starts look for his wife Sherry which leads him to Fear the Walking Dead.

=== Jesus ===
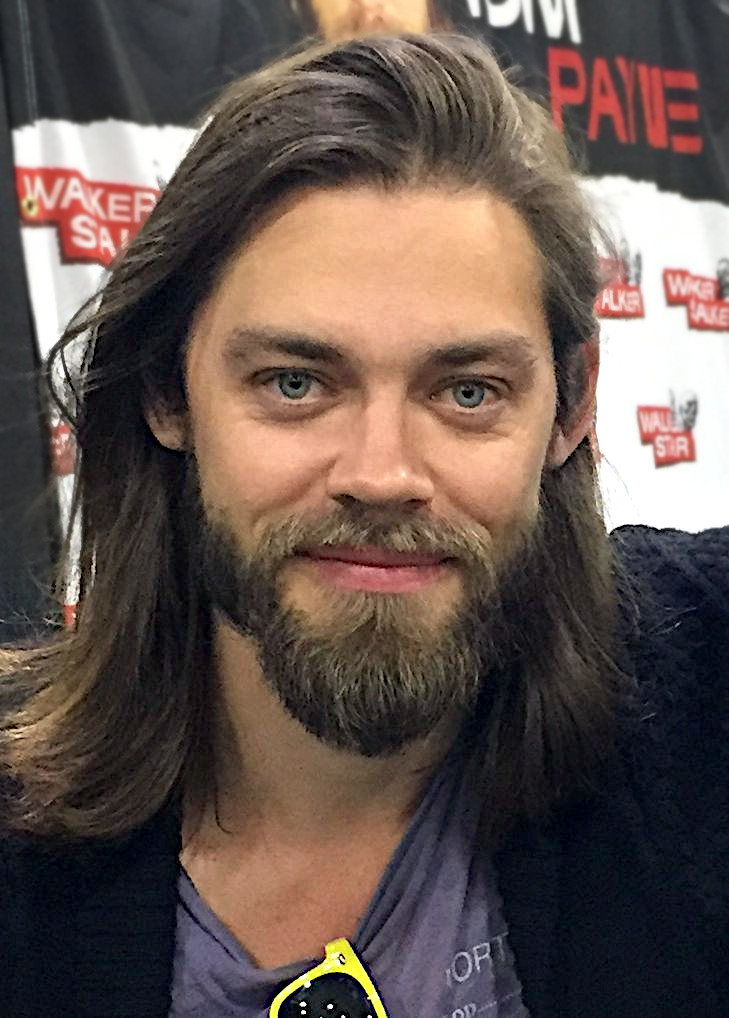
Tom Payne

Paul Rovia, or better known as Jesus, portrayed by Tom Payne, is a scout from the Hilltop Colony who introduces Rick and his group to the community. He has great skills in hand-to-hand fighting and was a very important piece for the war against the Saviors. After the defeat of the Saviors and Maggie overthrows Gregory's leadership, Jesus becomes Maggie's right-hand and adviser. He is the moral compass of the group and eventually became an intimate friend of Aaron. When Maggie leaves the Hilltop, he becomes the leader of the community position. In "Evolution", after finding Eugene with Daryl and Aaron, and trying to return home, Jesus is stabbed in the heart and killed by a Whisperer.

=== Gregory ===
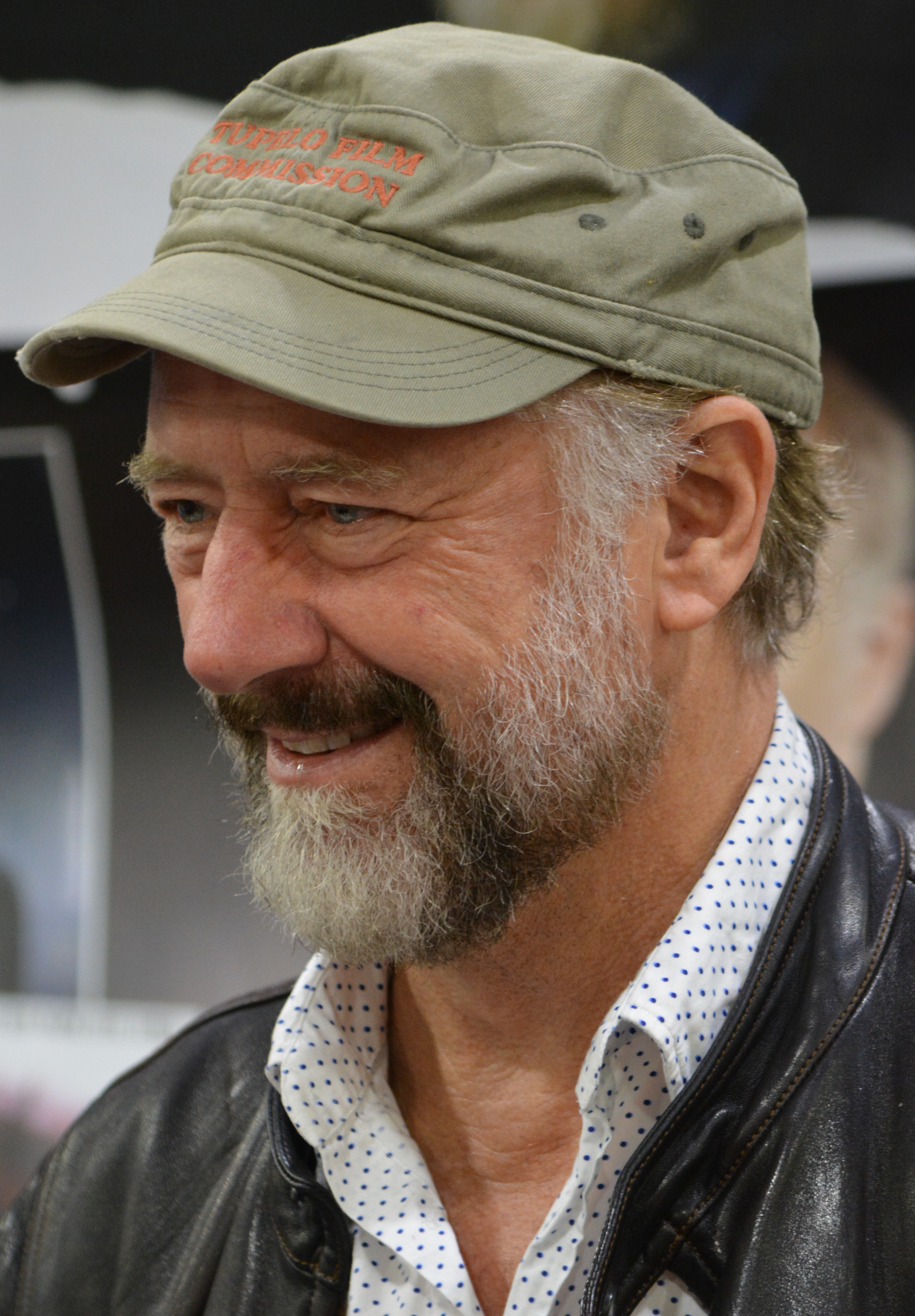
Xander Berkeley

Gregory, portrayed by Xander Berkeley, is the leader of the Hilltop Colony. He is shown to be an arrogant, cowardly, selfish, and treacherous man. His leadership led the Hilltop to the subjugation of Negan and the Saviors. It began to decline with the arrival of Rick's group. Before the war, Gregory accepted a deal from the Saviors and later broke that deal during the war. After the war, Gregory's charge collapsed leaving Maggie as his replacement. After a failed assassination attempt on Maggie, Gregory is executed by hanging on Maggie's order.

=== Ezekiel ===
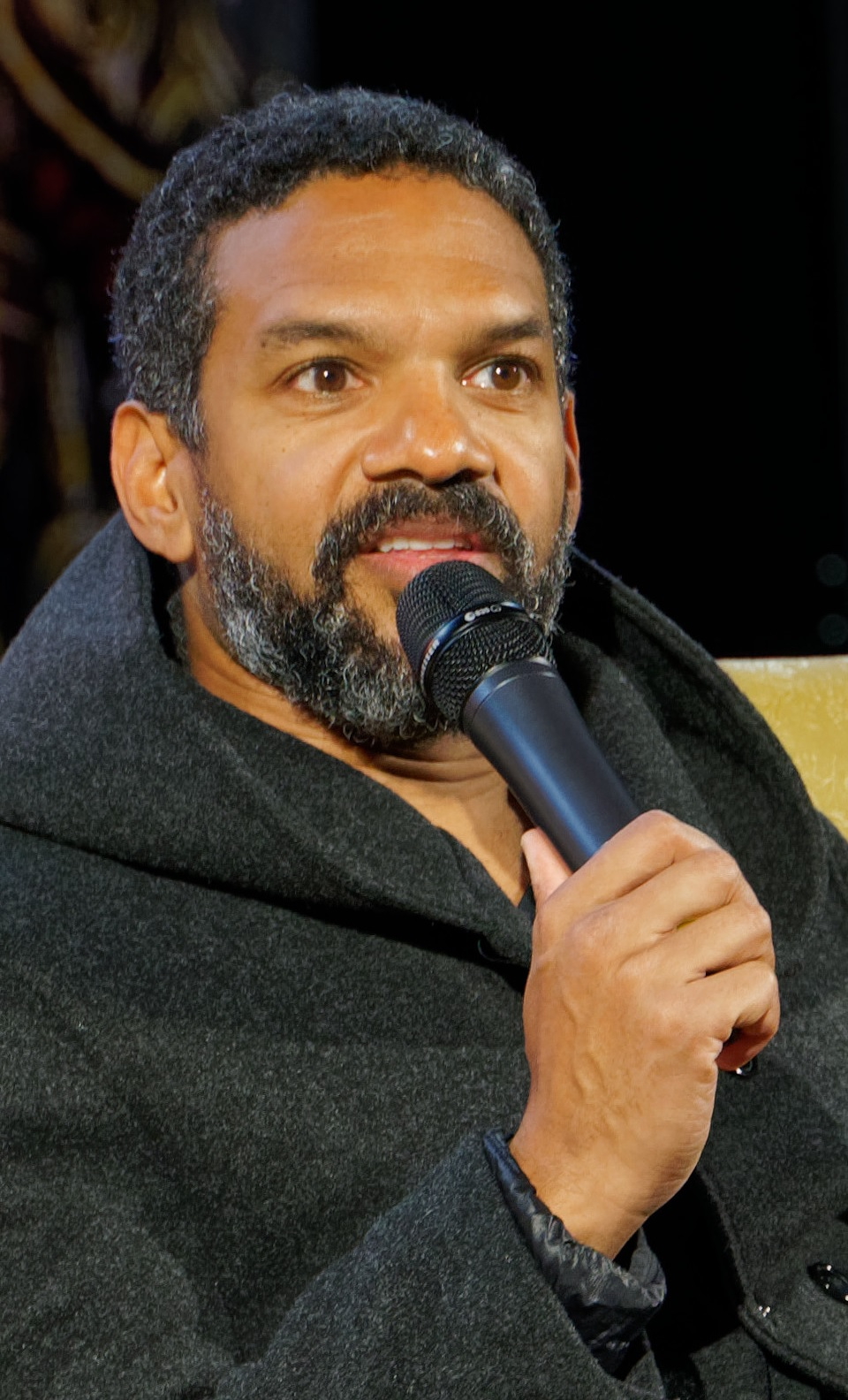
Khary Payton

Ezekiel Sutton, or better known as simply King Ezekiel or just Ezekiel, portrayed by Khary Payton, is the leader of a community known as "the Kingdom". Accompanied by his Bengal tiger, Shiva, Ezekiel has always been a pacifist leader, although his community lived in the terrified subjugation of the Saviors until Rick proposed to form an alliance to end Negan's tyranny. Ezekiel initially rejects Rick, but after a Savior, Jared, kills Benjamin, Ezekiel changes his mind and decides to combine forces with the Alexandria Safe-Zone and Hilltop Colony. Together, the three combined forces manage to defeat Negan and the Saviors. Six years after Negan is defeated, he marries Carol and adopts Henry as his son.

After Henry's death, his relationship with Carol falls apart and they separate. In "What It Always Is", Ezekiel reveals to Siddiq that he has thyroid cancer. Ezekiel accompanies Eugene and Yumiko to the Commonwealth, a distant community, a journey on which they are soon joined by Princess.

=== Simon ===
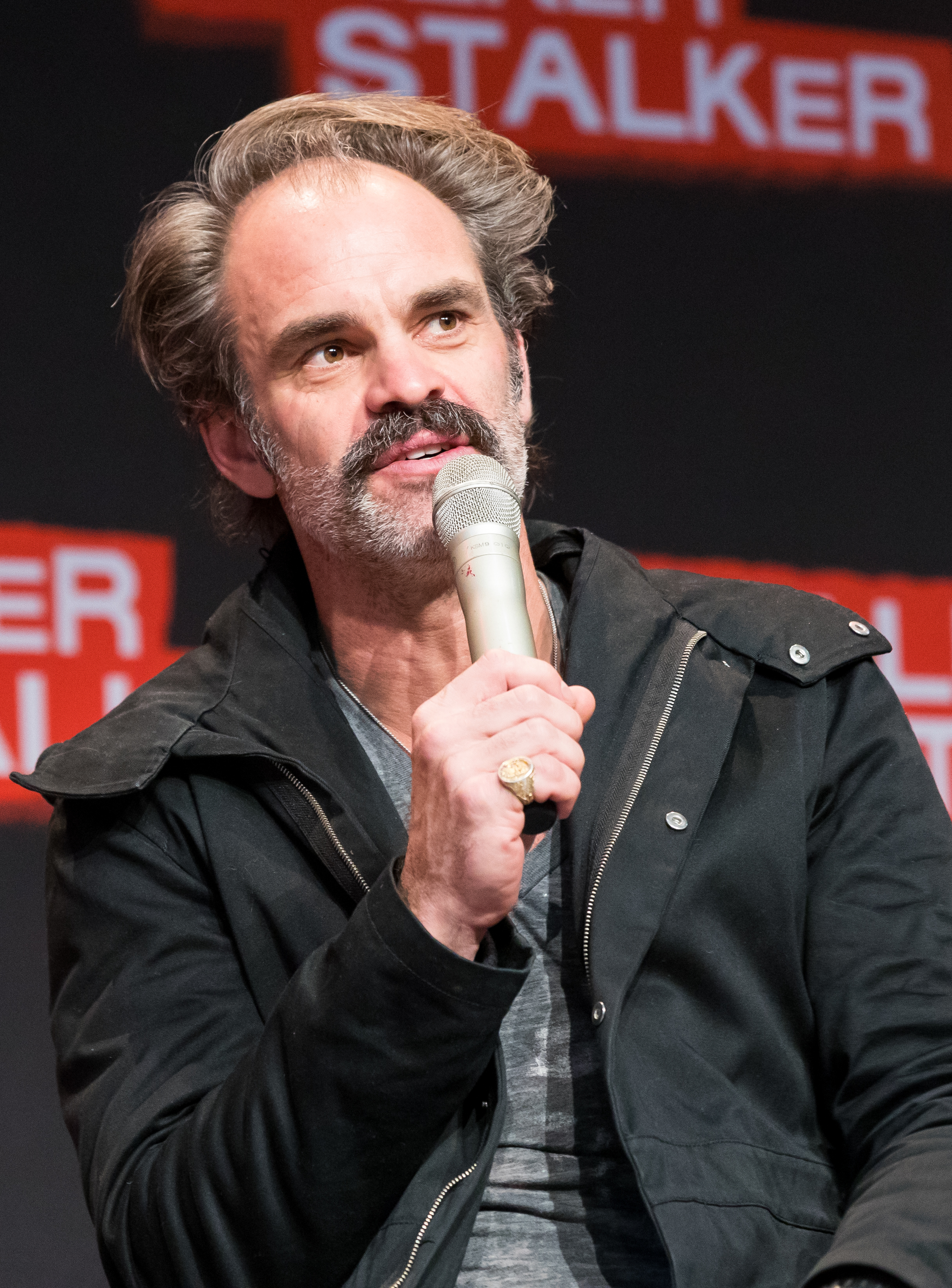
Steven Ogg

Simon (also known as Lead Savior in his first appearance), portrayed by Steven Ogg, is a high-ranking member of the Saviors who serves as Negan's right-hand man. He is shown to be an articulate, brutal, ruthless, and unpredictable man with a sadistic and unnerving sense of humor, and considered even by Negan too violent and "psychotic". Simon has displayed extreme loyalty to his leader and, as such, is highly valued and trusted by Negan. Like Negan, Simon is not beyond using fear and intimidation to achieve his goals while also being a remorseless, cold-blooded mass murderer and not at all bothered by the excessive violence that the Saviors employ.

However, his loyalty to Negan lessens as the war against the Militia progresses. During the course of the war, Simon becomes deranged, has differences with Negan, endangers the Sanctuary during an attack on the Hilltop Colony, desires to take control of the Saviors and, towards the end of the war, secretly attempts to kill Negan with a small group. However, Negan discovers his plan. Despite this and his backstabbing, Negan offers Simon a chance of leadership of the Saviors by fighting to the death, which Simon accepts. Simon initially gets the upper hand before Negan eventually overpowers him.

Negan then brutally strangles Simon to death, all the while furiously berating his right-hand man for ruining what chance they had left of making peace with Rick and the rest of the communities. Afterwards, Negan gives one final squeeze that crushes Simon's windpipe, killing him instantly. Following Simon's death, he reanimates as a walker and is chained to the Sanctuary fence; possibly some Savior ended his misery.

=== Enid ===
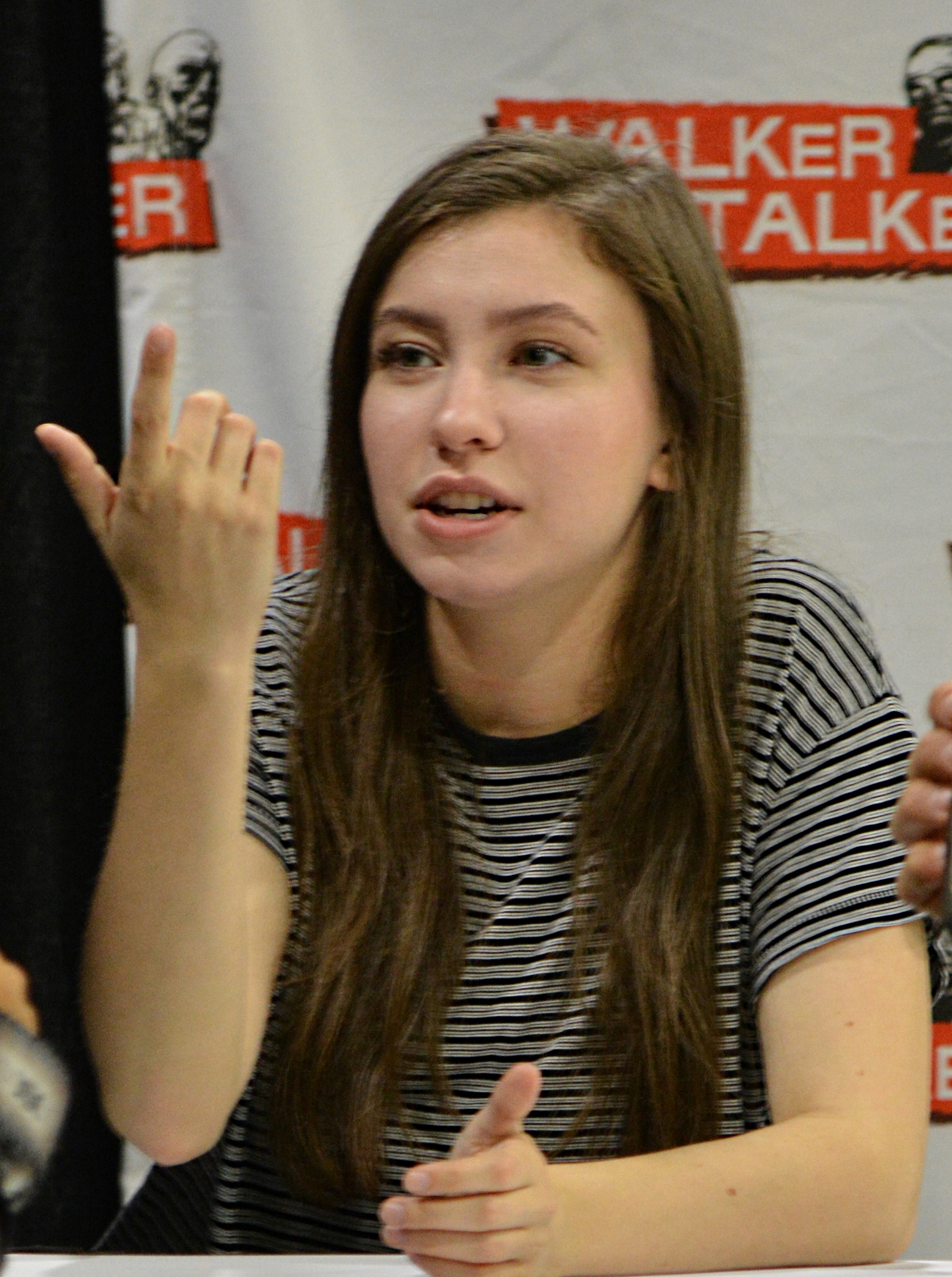
Katelyn Nacon

Enid, portrayed by Katelyn Nacon, is an Alexandria Safe-Zone resident. She is first introduced to Carl sitting on a bed with a book while Ron and Mikey show Carl their video games. She eventually develops a close bond with Carl. After the events with the Saviors, Enid moved to the Hilltop Colony to join Sasha and help Maggie during her pregnancy, and starts a loving relationship with Carl. After the war against the Saviors, she is devastated after the death of Carl and becomes Siddiq's apprentice in medical practices. After the alleged death of Rick, she became the Hilltop doctor and later enters into a relationship with Alden. However, she is killed by Alpha and her severed head is put on a spike.

=== Jadis ===
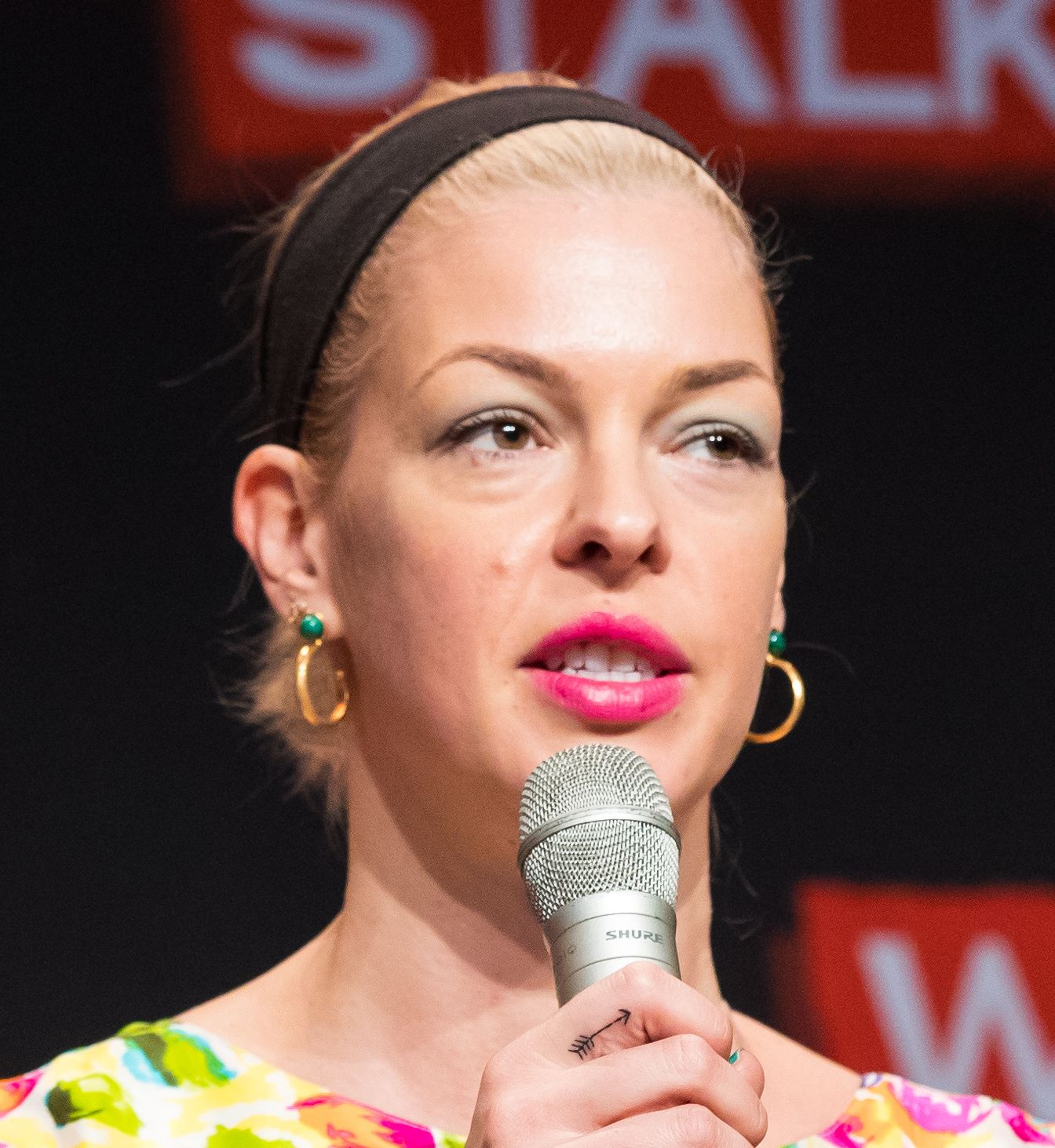
Pollyanna McIntosh

Anne, or better known as Jadis, portrayed by Pollyanna McIntosh, is the oddly spoken and enigmatic leader of the Scavengers who formed alliances with Negan and in the war maintained a neutral position with her group. After the war against the Saviors, she moved to the Alexandria Safe-Zone and had a brief romance with Gabriel. After finding a wounded Rick (following the destruction of the bridge), she redeems herself completely by convincing the helicopter pilot to help her to save him; together they both go to an unknown place to start a new journey.

=== Alden ===
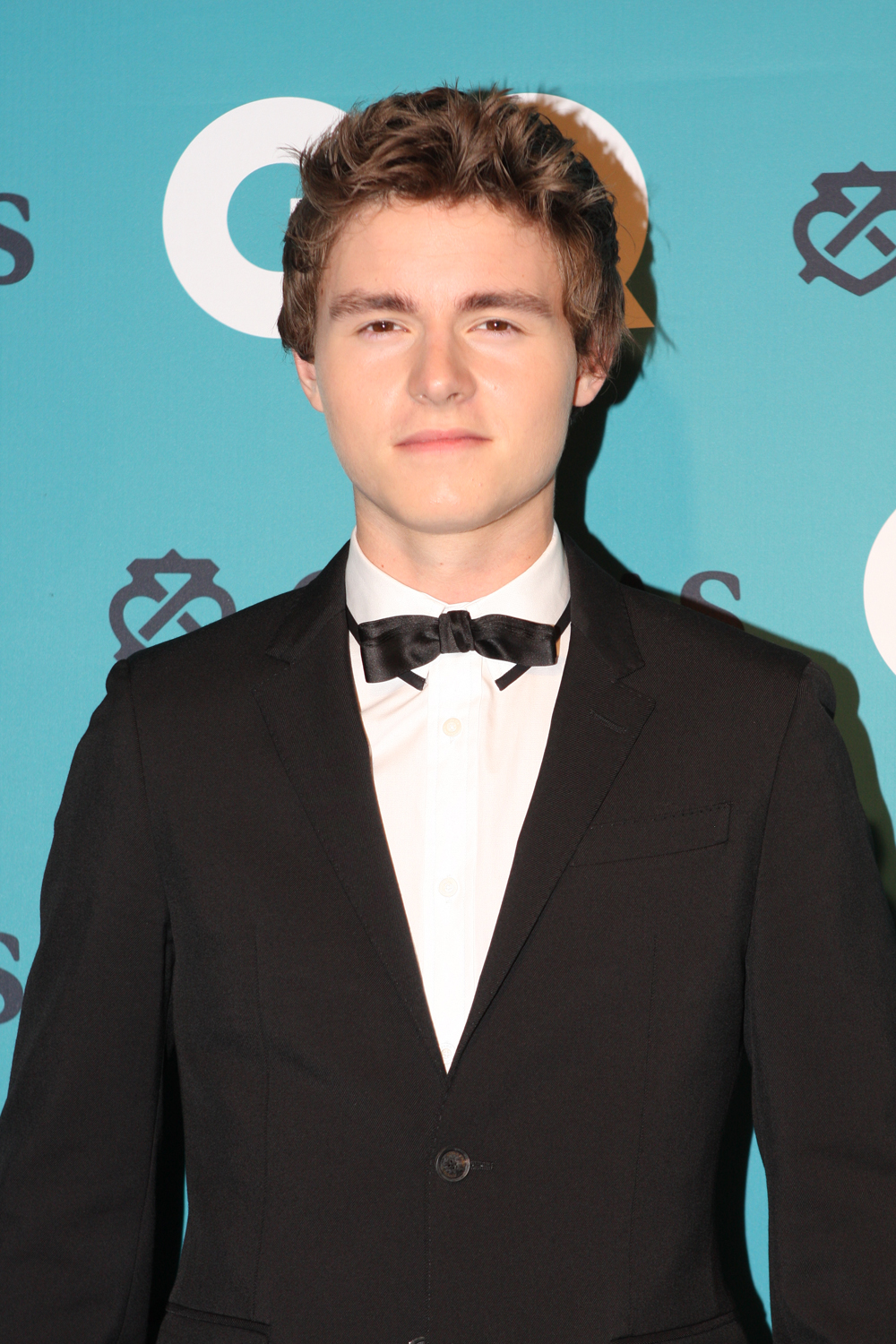
Callan McAuliffe

Alden, portrayed by Callan McAuliffe, is a member of the Saviors who watches over the satellite outpost. When Jesus and the Militia take his group by surprise, he surrenders along with the rest of his group. Eventually, seeing the courage of the Hilltop Colony, he and other Saviors decide to join the ranks of Maggie. During the war against Negan and the Saviors, he gains Maggie's respect and decides to start a fresh new life at the Hilltop. Months after Negan's defeat, Alden has become a close member of Maggie's leadership group within the Hilltop. Six years after Rick's supposed death at the destruction of the bridge, he is working as a blacksmith at the Hilltop while in a relationship with Enid. At the end of "Adaptation", Alden is captured by Alpha along with Luke. However, they are returned in exchange for Lydia in the following episode. In "Hunted", Alden escapes the Reaper ambush, but he is attacked in an abandoned shopping mall by two Reapers that are later identified as Bossie and Michael Turner. Maggie and Negan manage to kill Turner and wound Bossie, forcing him to flee with Turner's body, but not before Bossie severely wounds Alden. Maggie refuses to leave Alden behind and she and Negan support him as they continue with their mission, but they have to stop in an abandoned church. Knowing that he is only slowing them down, Alden joins Negan in urging Maggie to leave behind and continuing on without him. Maggie reluctantly agrees, but she leaves Alden with some food and a knife to defend himself until they can return for him. After Maggie and Negan leave, Alden barricades the church door and settles in to wait. In "No Other Way", Alden, at some point, engaged in a fight with an unnamed reaper which causes him to have his throat slit in the process, though Alden succeeds in killing the aforementioned reaper. Maggie goes back to the church to find a zombified Alden and puts him and the Reaper down before burying Alden's body nearby.

=== Siddiq ===
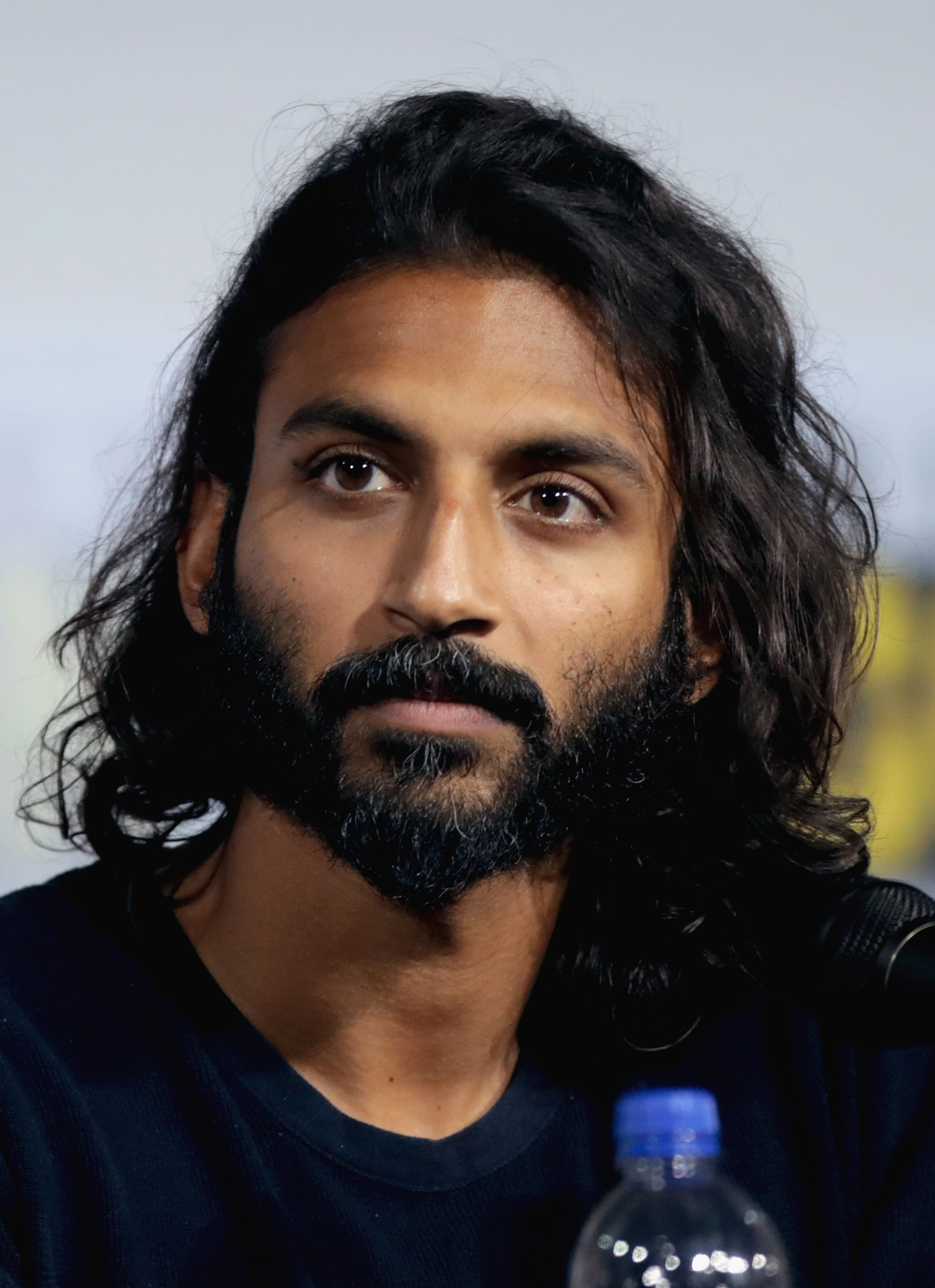
Avi Nash

Siddiq, portrayed by Avi Nash, is a lone survivor skilled in medical practices who debuts in "Mercy". He is first seen surrendering to Carl and tells him that he has not eaten in a few days. When Carl suddenly points a gun at Siddiq, he tries to calm Carl down, but Rick then arrives and fires a few warning shots, which makes Siddiq run away. Later, Carl returns and leaves two cans of food with a note saying: "Sorry". Siddiq watches Carl from the bushes as he walks away. Eventually, Siddiq is willing to accept Carl's help, and the two head back to the Alexandria Safe-Zone; however, Carl is bitten by a walker. As Carl is dying, Siddiq promises to honor Carl's legacy by doing for others what Carl did for him.

Six years after Rick's supposed death at the destruction of the bridge, he is the lead doctor for Alexandria and has taken Enid as his apprentice. He is a member of the Alexandria Council and seems to be one of the few people who still have a positive relationship with Michonne, often advising her on matters. Later, Siddiq is revealed to be the father of Rosita's baby, conceived after a brief fling. He is the sole survivor of those kidnapped by Alpha during the fair, and his memories of what he witnessed tortured him until he was eventually killed by Dante upon realizing he is a Whisperer spy and reanimates as a walker before being put down by Rosita.

=== Alpha ===
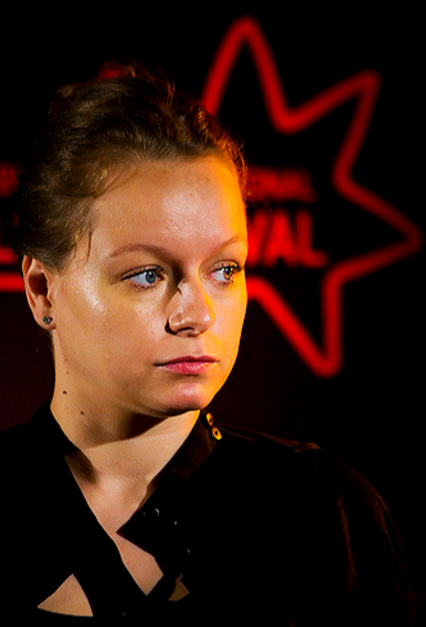
Samantha Morton

Alpha, portrayed by Samantha Morton, is the leader of The Whisperers, a mysterious group of hostile survivors who disguise themselves with the skin of the undead in order to blend in with them and not get noticed, and the main antagonist of the second half of season nine and the whole of season ten. She is shown to be a cold, cunning, egocentric, psychopathic, sadistic, and highly intelligent woman who is a hardened, determined survivor and a strong leader to those in her group, appearing to enjoy being in a position of authority and does not take kindly to anyone who opposes her.

Alpha first appears at the end of "Adaptation", aiming Alden and Luke with a sawed-off shotgun. In "Omega", Alpha's dark past is revealed in flashbacks. It is shown that she killed her husband Frank and their group of survivors during the initial stages of the outbreak, considering them as "weak people". At the end of the episode, she appears unmasked at the Hilltop Colony with some members of her group, asking the community to return her daughter Lydia. In "The Calm Before", it is revealed that she brutally murdered and beheaded Ozzy, Alek, D.J., Frankie, Tammy, Rodney, Addy, Enid, Tara, and Henry. The beheaded members' heads are then placed on spikes, marking the boundary of a new border. Alpha does this in order to warn the communities not to cross into The Whisperers' territory.

Alpha later escalates the conflict into an all-out war after Lydia rejects her completely, forming a relationship with Negan in the process. However, after capturing Lydia, Negan lures Alpha into a trap and slits her throat. Negan subsequently delivers Alpha's reanimated head to Carol, with whom he had been working, because Carol had been obsessed with killing Alpha in revenge for the murder of her adopted son, Henry. Shortly after, Beta finds the head, and furiously grabs one of his men and feeds part The Whisperer's face to Alpha's reanimated head; Beta takes the head with him inside a bag. Inside an abandoned building, Beta puts down Alpha, and skins half of her face and attaches it to himself to wear as the new right side of his own mask, declaring himself the new leader of The Whisperers.

=== Beta ===
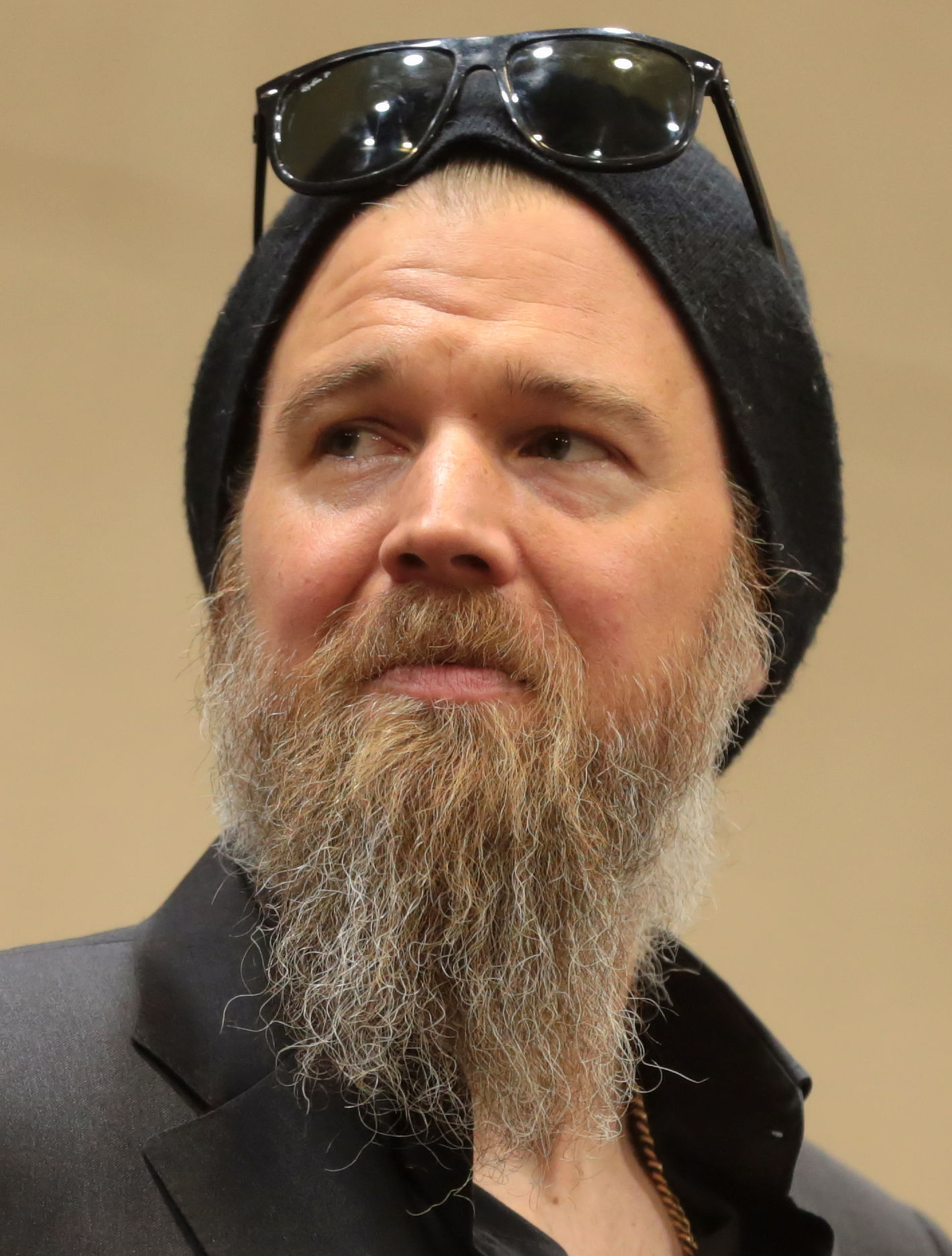
Ryan Hurst

Beta, portrayed by Ryan Hurst, is the second-in-command of The Whisperers and Alpha's right-hand man. He serves as the secondary antagonist of the second half of the ninth season. Beta has a huge and corpulent stature. He is shown to be an aggressive, brutal, cunning, and highly analytical man who is devoted to The Whisperer way of life. Beta is completely loyal to Alpha, following her orders without question and respecting her decisions completely. Due to his large size and strength, Beta is a very dangerous opponent, capable of using excessive force to protect his group and a skilled fighter.

He is shown to be quite capable of cold-blooded murder, and appears to be a highly skilled tracker and strategic thinker as well which makes him a vital member of The Whisperers. Beta is more than willing to harm any Whisperer who poses a threat to Alpha and to keep the others in line. He first appears in "Guardians", where he captures Henry. In "Chokepoint", Daryl has a one-on-one fight with Beta, which ends with Daryl pushing Beta into an open elevator shaft. Beta survives and finds a way out.

In "Look at the Flowers", Beta discovers Alpha's severed head on a spike. In response, a furious Beta ends one of his men and puts the head inside a bag. Carrying the bag, he goes inside an abandoned building. There, his past identity as a famous country music singer is revealed. He plays one of his own records at high volume, luring walkers to his location. He then puts down Alpha, and skins half of her face and attaches it to himself to wear as the new right side of his own mask, declaring himself the new leader of The Whisperers. Beta then leads the horde of walkers to the Alexandria Safe-Zone.

In "A Certain Doom", Beta discovers the group's hiding place, and attacks with The Whisperers and a gigantic walker horde. The group manages to evade the walkers and send the horde off-track, but The Whisperers overwhelm them. During the fight, Beta is attacked by Negan, but gains the upper hand, and is about to kill Negan when Daryl intervenes, stabbing Beta in the eyes. Mortally injured, Beta is taken down by the walkers surrounding him.

=== Yumiko ===
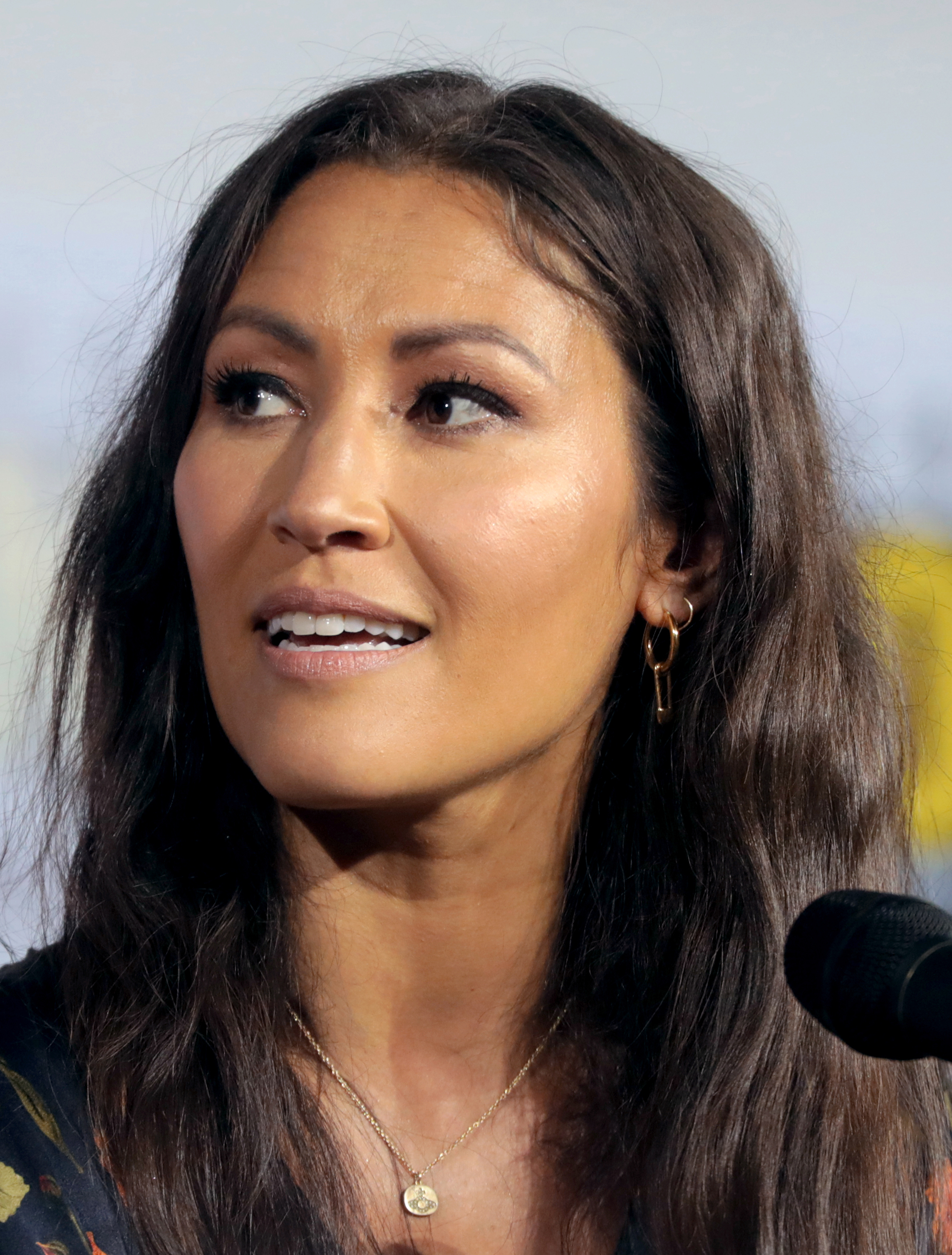
Eleanor Matsuura

Yumiko Okumura (Japanese: 由美子 奥村), or better known as simply Yumiko, portrayed by Eleanor Matsuura, is a member of Magna's group, a former criminal defense lawyer, and Magna's girlfriend. She is wounded on the road when a horde of walkers surround them but recovered shortly thereafter. She and the rest of her group begin living at the Hilltop Colony just prior to the Whisperers' arrival. Since the deaths of both Jesus and Tara, Yumiko has taken on a leadership role at the Hilltop, something Magna does not fully support. Yumiko, along with Ezekiel, volunteers to accompany Eugene to the Commonwealth, a distant community. They are soon joined on their journey by Princess, with whom Yumiko has a brief hostility. In "A Certain Doom", when they arrive at the Commonwealth, they are surrounded by soldiers wearing white armor.

=== Jerry ===
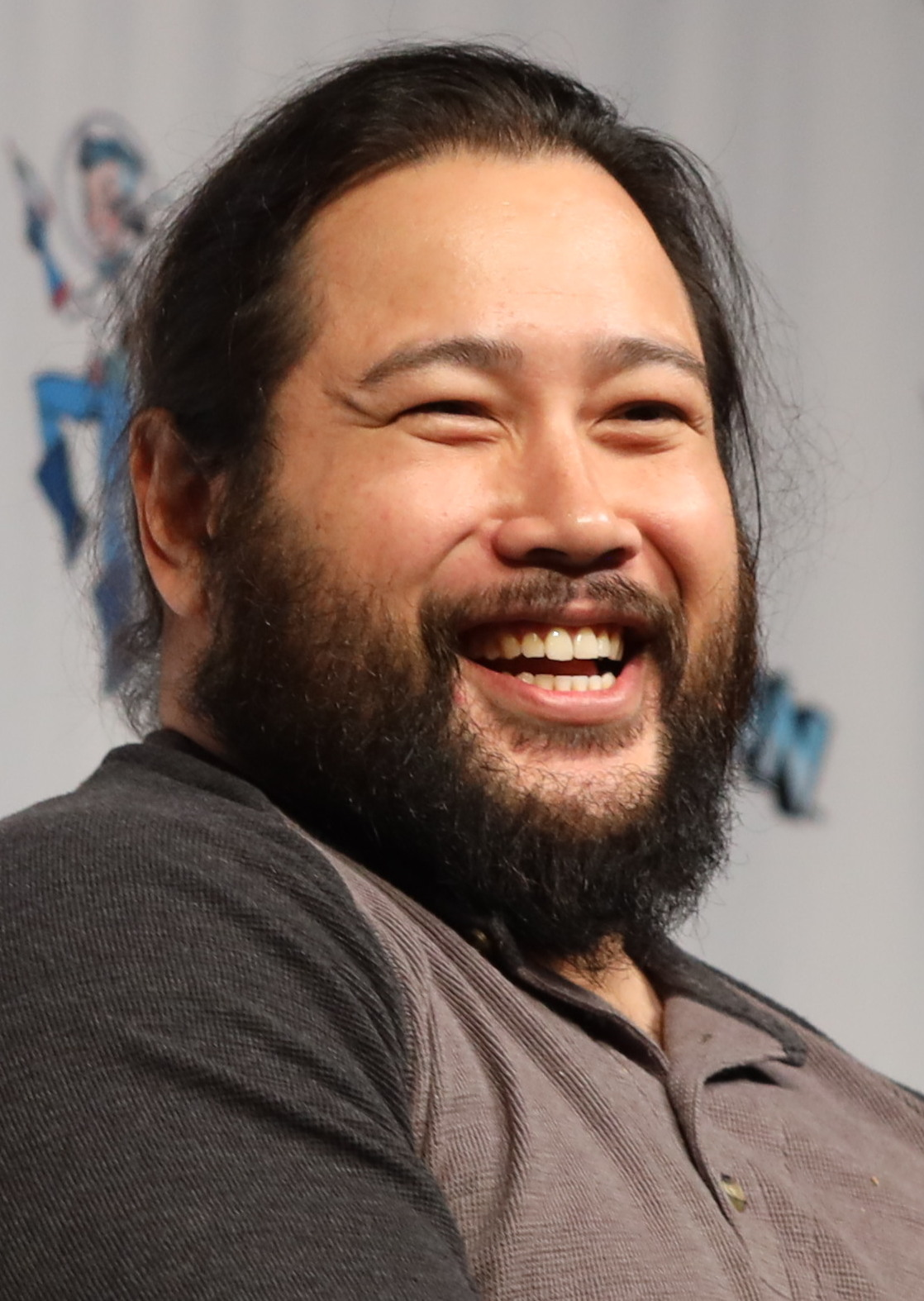
Cooper Andrews

Jerry, portrayed by Cooper Andrews, is a member of the Kingdom and Ezekiel's steward. He is a man of enormous size but is charismatic, cheerful, and kind to people. Jerry is also described as a good, loyal friend, which is demonstrated during the war against Negan. When a Savior is about to execute Ezekiel, Jerry saves him from certain death. Even though Ezekiel asks him to run, Jerry refuses to leave him. At some point during the two timeskips, Jerry has begun a relationship with Nabila and has three children with her.

=== Magna ===
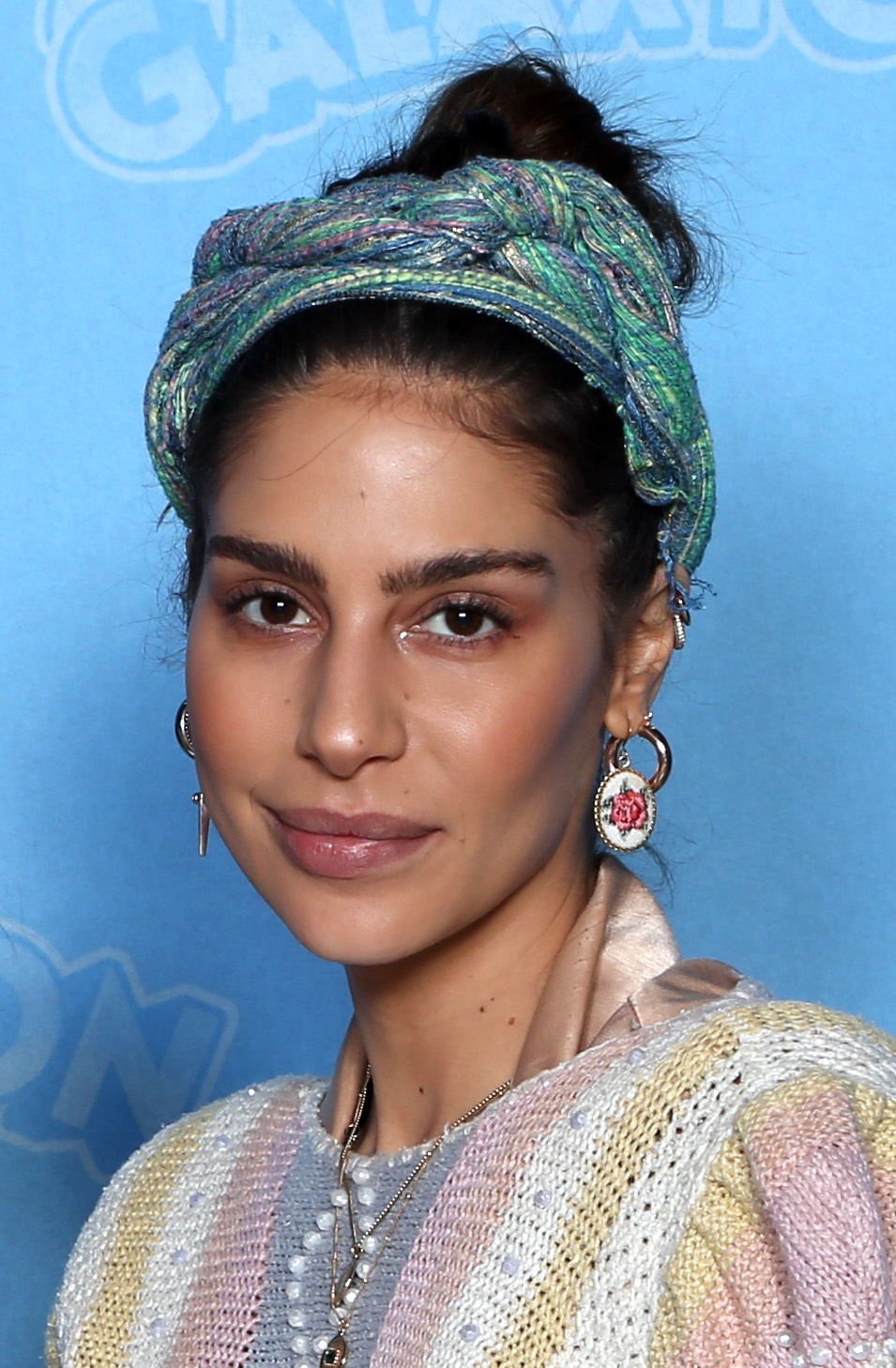
Nadia Hilker

Magna, portrayed by Nadia Hilker, is the leader of a small group of roaming survivors and Yumiko's girlfriend. She and her people first appear in "What Comes After", fighting against a walking horde that is overwhelming them and shortly after rescued by Judith Grimes. Magna and her companions are then brought to the Alexandria Safe-Zone, before eventually moving to reside in the Hilltop Colony. In "Who Are You Now?", she is revealed to carry a series of hidden knives on her person and to have served time in prison. Though she considers attacking Michonne, who is untrusting of her, she relents after seeing Michonne's family and instead turns over her last knife.

In "Squeeze", Magna and Connie become trapped in a walker-filled cave leaving their fates unknown. However, in "Walk with Us", Magna is revealed to have survived and escaped, but Connie's fate remains unknown as Magna got separated from her in the horde.

=== Judith Grimes ===
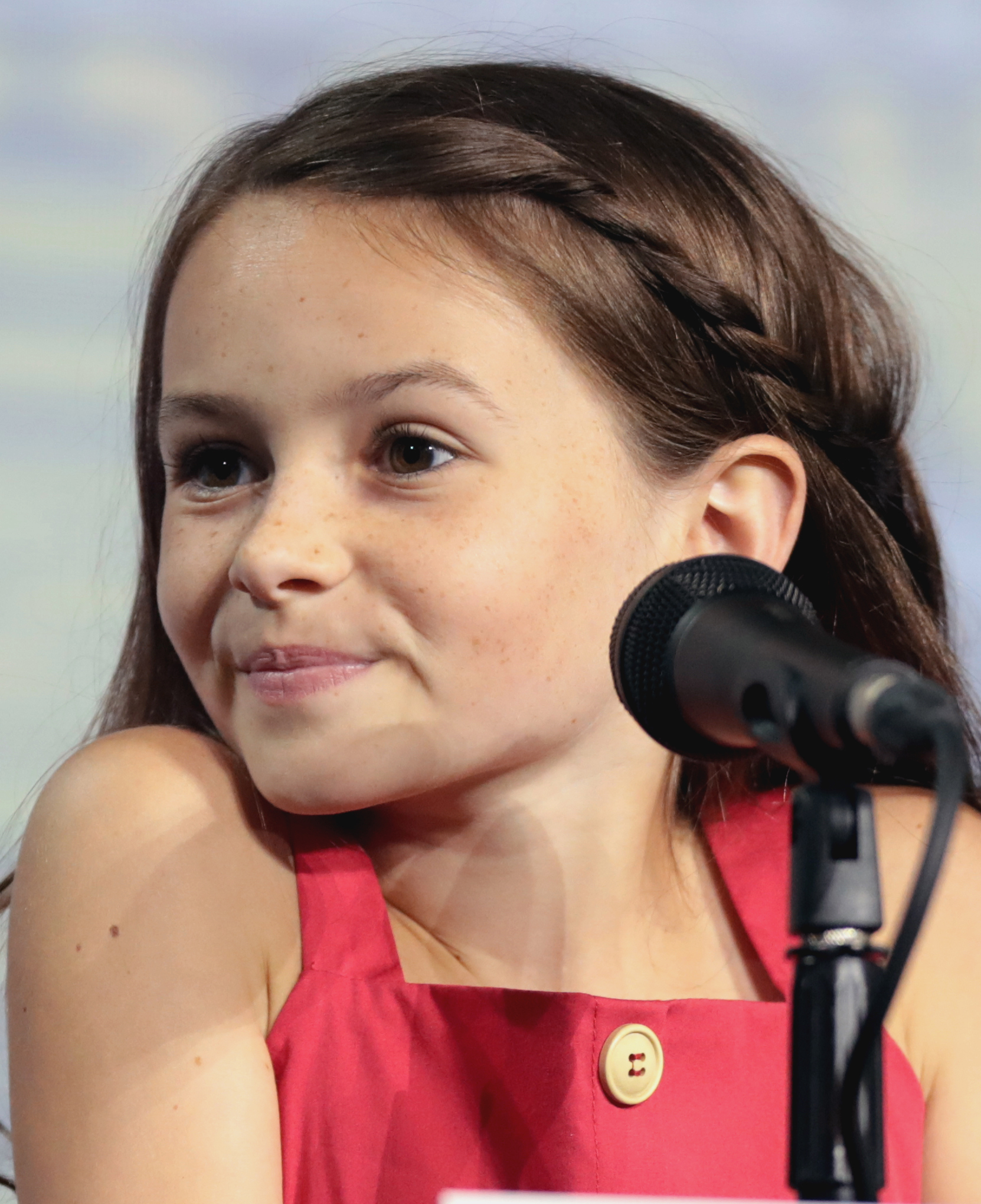
Cailey Fleming

Judith Grimes, portrayed by Cailey Fleming, is Shane and Lori's daughter and Carl's half-sister. She is born in the Season 3 episode "Killer Within". Maggie delivers her via a crude C-section, using Carl's knife. Lori dies during childbirth. Daryl nicknames the baby "Lil' Asskicker", and Rick allows Carl to name her after his third-grade teacher, Judith Mueller. Judith's fate is seemingly unknown following the Governor's final assault on the prison. Rick and Carl find Judith's empty car seat, stained heavily with blood, and presume her to be dead.

It is revealed that Tyreese had rescued Judith before escaping from the prison with Lizzie and Mika—the three are walking through a forest, with Tyreese holding Judith in his arms, before they reunite with Carol. During the year and a half that has passed since the end of the war, Judith has been raised by Rick and Michonne in a rebuilt and thriving Alexandria Safe-Zone. Six years later, Magna's group takes on a herd of walkers. They quickly get overwhelmed but are saved when the walkers around them get shot from the trees. Magna and her group escape into the woods to find an older Judith, around nine years old, armed with Rick's revolver and a katana.

They introduce themselves and ask what her name is. She picks up her hat and introduces herself as Judith Grimes. Judith later argues with Michonne to allow Magna's group to stay and is shown to have befriended Negan out of pity for his situation. When Negan escapes, Judith lets him go and then escorts him back to Alexandria after she finds him on the road. It is Judith who ultimately convinces Michonne to reconnect Alexandria with the other communities. According to Negan, Judith is just as much of a badass as Carl was and can tell when someone is lying to her, leading to Negan treating Judith with a great deal of respect and being honest with her during his stories of her family and friends.

=== Lydia ===
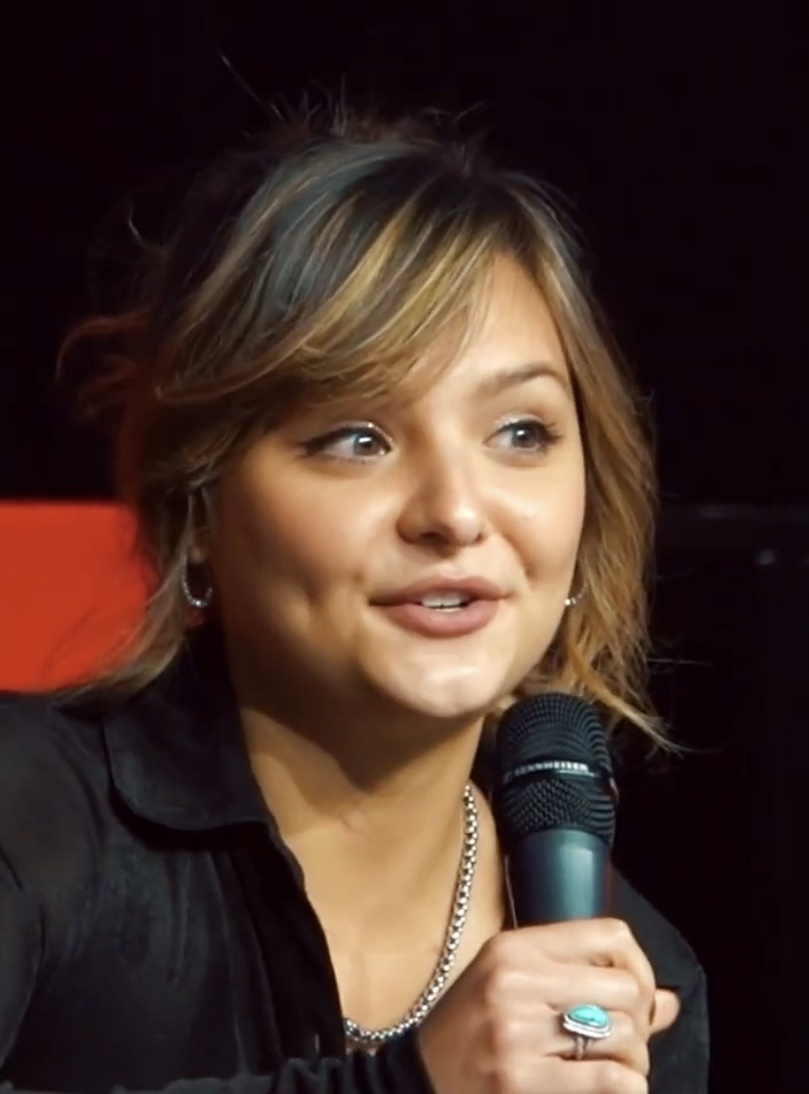
Cassady McClincy

Lydia, portrayed by Cassady McClincy (teenager) and Scarlett & Havana Blum (young), is a survivor who, along with her parents, Alpha and Frank, survived the initial stages of the outbreak. After 23 days of the initial outbreak, Lydia and her parents remained in a moldy basement with a group of survivors. Lydia used to be naive about the state of the world and always spent time with her father, since her mother is a very cold person. After the death of her father, Lydia begins to have a nefarious treatment on the part of her mother.

In "Adaptation", after being captured by Daryl and Michonne, and kept as a prisoner in a cell at the Hilltop Colony, Lydia begins to form a bond with Henry. Eventually, Lydia falls in love with Henry and begins a relationship with him, ultimately rejecting the Whisperers in favor of the other communities, who agree to grant Lydia asylum. In "The Calm Before", Lydia rejects Alpha and The Whisperers completely, and is disowned by her mother. Her relationship with Henry is cut short when he, alongside nine others, is brutally murdered by her mother. She then lives in the Kingdom with Daryl before its fall and moves into the Alexandria Safe-Zone, displaying some suicidal tendencies out of guilt.

Several months after the fair massacre, Lydia continues living with Daryl in Alexandria, but struggles to fit in with many people being angry and untrusting of her. She adopts Henry's staff and chosen form of aikido, which Henry had learned from Morgan. When a small group attempts to attack and kill her, Negan is the only one to step in and save Lydia, though it causes trouble when he accidentally kills one of them in the process. Eventually, when Carol learns that Alpha has lied to her people about killing Lydia, Carol tries to use Lydia to turn them against Alpha. After encountering Gamma and seeing her reaction to Lydia's well-being, Lydia immediately realizes what Carol has done and runs away, refusing to be used by someone again.

In "Stalker", Lydia returns to rescue Daryl, who is succumbing to his wounds inside an abandoned gas station after a one-on-one brutal fight with Alpha. Her mother succumbs to her own wounds as well. Recognizing that while the people in the communities are not perfect, they are Lydia's best chance of living a normal life. She is unable to kill her mother, who requested that Lydia kill her. She departs with Daryl and nurses him back to health. Disowning her mother permanently causes Alpha to press the conflict into a full-scale war.

=== Connie ===
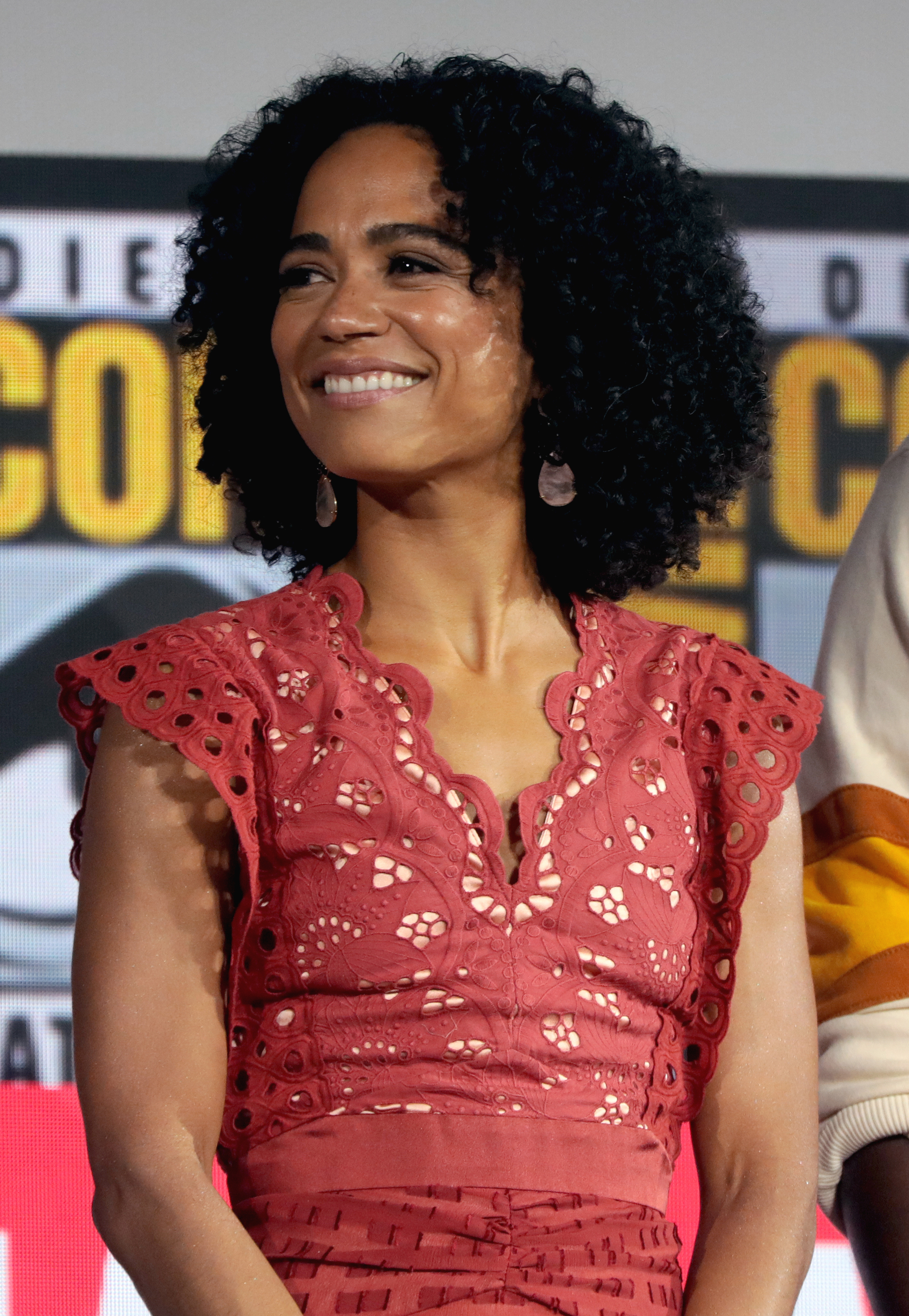
Lauren Ridloff

Connie Cook, portrayed by Lauren Ridloff, is a deaf member of Magna's group. After moving to the Hilltop Colony, she not only saves a baby that the Whisperers had left behind to be eaten by walkers but also helps Daryl in rescuing Henry and Lydia from the Whisperers, traveling with them until they escort the two back to the Kingdom. Months later, these events have bonded Connie and Daryl, who now share a very close friendship with Daryl even finding an American Sign Language book to learn how to better communicate with her.

When Magna and Connie become trapped in a walker-filled cave leaving their fates unknown. However, in "Walk with Us", Magna is revealed to have survived and escaped, but Connie's fate remains unknown as Magna got separated from her in the horde. In "A Certain Doom" It is revealed that she is alive, she is discovered by Virgil who sees her lying weak, dirty and untidy in the forest.

=== Princess ===
Juanita Sanchez, or better known as simply Princess, portrayed by Paola Lázaro, is a quirky and flamboyant survivor. She joins the group of Eugene, Ezekiel, and Yumiko. The former at first had no empathy for her, but eventually managed to befriend Princess. In "A Certain Doom", when they arrive at the rendezvous point to meet Stephanie, the group is surrounded by soldiers in white armor. She is then locked in a boxcar and begins having hallucinations.

=== Leah Shaw ===
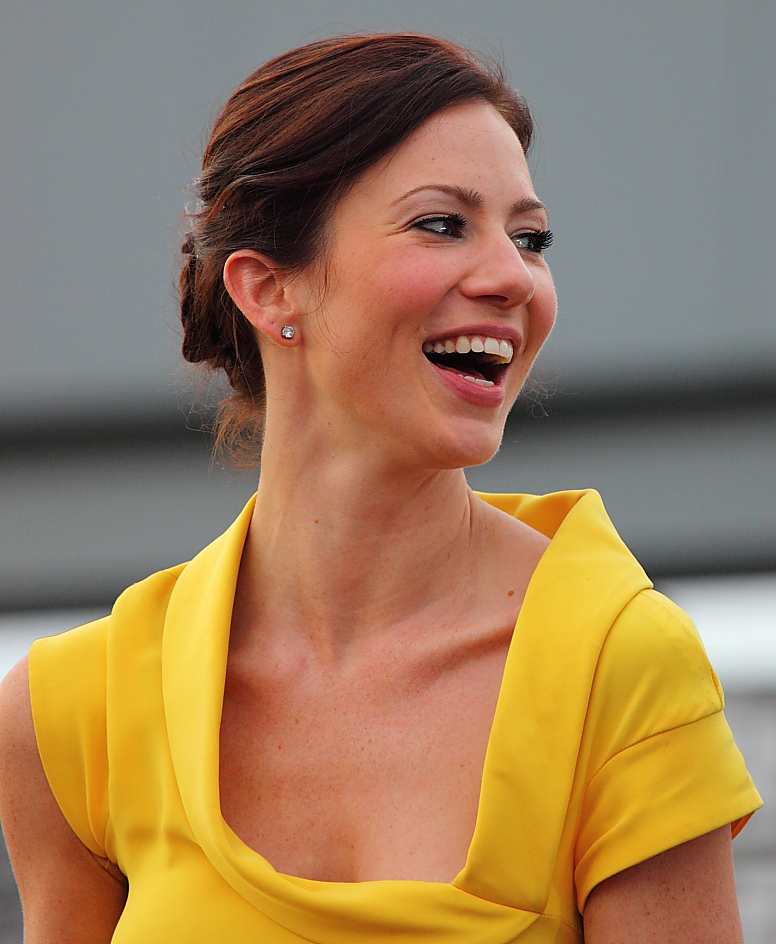
Lynn Collins

- Leah Shaw, portrayed by Lynn Collins, is the former owner of Dog and for a time, during the six-year time jump, formed a love bond with Daryl. She accepted his insistence on searching for Rick, but eventually rejoins the reapers and threatens to kill Maggie, causing Daryl to shoot her in the head.

=== Kelly ===
- Kelly Cook, portrayed by Angel Theory, is a member of Magna's group and Connie's protective sister.

== Supporting characters ==
=== Atlanta Survivor Camp ===
The Atlanta Survivor Camp, first appearing in "Days Gone Bye", is a base camp established in a quarry just outside the city of Atlanta, Georgia, near Interstate 85. It is led by the opaque leadership of Shane until Rick's arrival. Under Rick's more balanced leadership, most of the survivors want to live peacefully away from the walkers except for Ed and Shane who cause problems, but with the course of history the majority of the group dies while others depart the group.

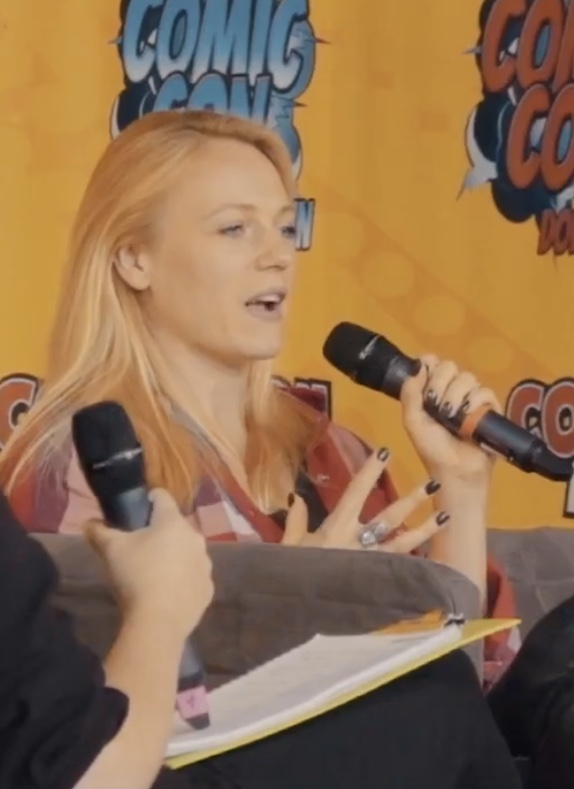
Emma Bell

- Amy, portrayed by Emma Bell, is Andrea's younger sister. When the dead begin to rise, Amy and Andrea joined the survivor group existing on the outer limits of the overrun city of Atlanta. She decided to stay at the camp whilst Andrea was still in Atlanta. She and her sister spent most of the time fishing for the group. In "Vatos", the night before her birthday, Amy is bitten by a walker in the opening stages of a walker swarm's attack on the exposed camp and dies in Andrea's arms. She later reanimates and is put down by her sister. Andrea is distraught after Amy's death and wants to stay in the Centers for Disease Control (CDC) and die, but Dale convinces Andrea not to. Amy's death drives Andrea into a deep depression for the majority of the second season, causing her to be angry at Dale for convincing her to leave the CDC.

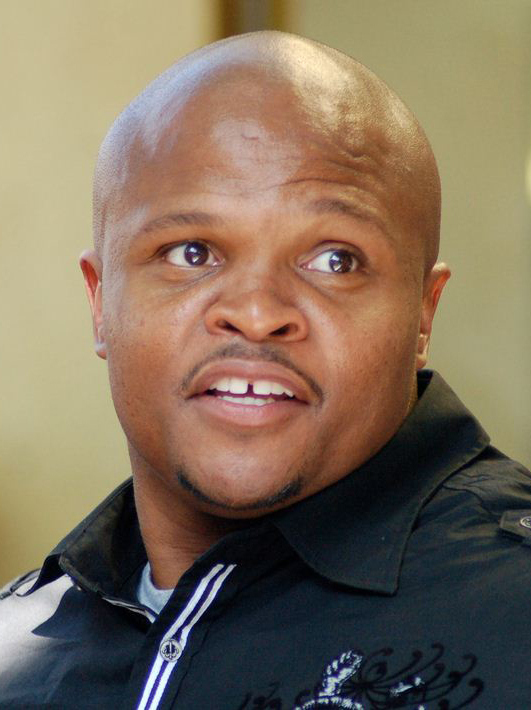
IronE Singleton

- Theodore "T-Dog" Douglas, portrayed by IronE Singleton, is a muscular and well-intentioned man who becomes extremely loyal to Rick. He is part of the group Rick meets in the Atlanta department store, and after Rick subdues Merle he accidentally drops the key to the handcuffs down a drainpipe leaving Merle trapped on the rooftop. T-Dog, Glenn, Rick, and Daryl go back to save Merle, but find that he cut his own hand off to free himself. T-Dog later cuts himself on an abandoned car on the highway and develops blood poisoning. He travels with the group to Hershel's farm and survives its destruction before traveling to the prison. He helps clear the prison, but is bitten while securing the gate. He later sacrifices himself to save Carol during a walker attack.
- Jacqui, portrayed by Jeryl Prescott Sales, is a member of the Atlanta Survivor Camp. She is aware that Carol's husband physically abused her and confronted him about it; she also helped Jim to die peacefully. She accompanies the band to the CDC. At first, she believes the CDC will have a cure and save them, and she despairs with the rest of the group when they learn that there is no cure. She elects to remain behind with Dr. Edwin Jenner when the CDC self-destructs, holding his hand when the building explodes. Jacqui is one of the people that Rick hallucinates as haunting him throughout the third season.
- Jim, portrayed by Andrew Rothenberg, is a member of the Atlanta Survivor Camp. He is the only left survivor of his family and believed that everyone else is going to die as he tried to dig up graves. During a walker attack on the group, Jim is bitten, but says nothing until Jacqui finds out. Jim suffers the effects of the infection for days before asking to be abandoned on the road to the CDC in order to rejoin his family, deciding to become a walker rather than being given a gun to commit suicide or being put down.
- The Morales Family, portrayed by Juan Pareja, Viviana Chavez-Vega, Maddie Lomax and Noah Lomax, consists of the husband (Juan Pareja), who goes by his last name, his wife Miranda (Viviana Chavez-Vega), and their two young children, Eliza (Maddie Lomax) and Louis (Noah Lomax). After the survivors decide to go to the CDC, the Morales' decide to try their luck locating relatives in Birmingham, Alabama. Their fate was unknown for many years until "The Damned", when Rick encounters the husband in a Savior outpost where he has become a Savior. Morales reveals that his family never reached Birmingham, and that he went insane after losing his wife and children before joining the Saviors. During the standoff between Rick and Morales in "Monsters", Morales is killed by Daryl with a crossbow bolt to the head despite Rick's attempts to stop him. The death of Morales and his family leaves Rick, Daryl, and Carol as the only surviving members of the Atlanta Survivor Camp.
- Ed Peletier, portrayed by Adam Minarovich, is Carol's husband and Sophia's father. He is abusive, lazy, mean-spirited, and sexist. After Ed slaps his wife in front of other survivors, Shane beats Ed badly, threatening to kill him the next time he sees Ed lay his hands on his family or anyone else again. Due to his injuries, Ed remains in his tent and becomes the first victim of a subsequent walker attack, when he unknowingly opens the tent to a walker outside ("Vatos"). His body is left severely mutilated and Carol decides to drive a pickaxe through his head herself to prevent his reanimation rather than to have Daryl do it. Carol ends up taking her frustrations out on his body for his abuse at the same time ("Wildfire"). Ed appears one last time in a flashback to shortly after the outbreak began ("Chupacabra").

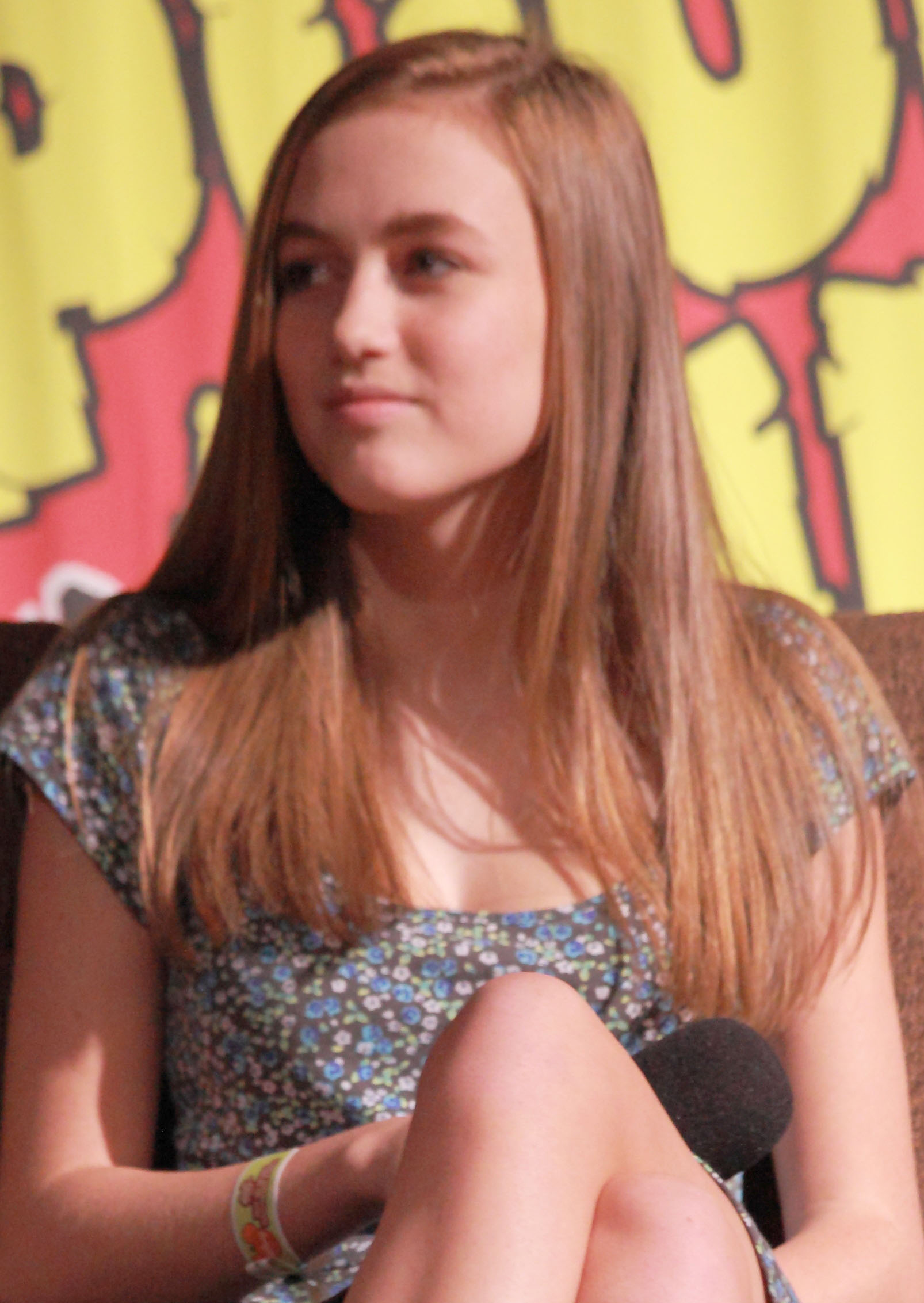
Madison Lintz

- Sophia Peletier, portrayed by Madison Lintz, is Carol and Ed Peletier's twelve-year-old daughter. Sophia and her mother are shown to be closer to the Grimes family after Ed is killed by a walker, and both Sophia and her mother become more outspoken and happy following Ed's demise. In "What Lies Ahead", walkers chase Sophia into the woods, and she becomes detached from the group. The group searches for her, but in "Pretty Much Dead Already", it is revealed that Sophia became a walker and was being kept in Hershel's barn. Rick remorsefully shoots her and she then is buried at the farm.

=== Greene Family Farm ===
The Greene Family Farm, first appearing in "Bloodletting", is led by patriarch Hershel Greene, where he lives with his daughters Maggie and Beth, his foreman Otis, Otis' wife Patricia, and Jimmy, Beth's boyfriend, who is tutored by Hershel. At the beginning, he had many problems with Rick about the walkers and ignored what was happening in the outside world, but eventually Hershel and Rick formed a great friendship by becoming advisors to one another.

- Otis, portrayed by Pruitt Taylor Vince, is Hershel's ranch hand and Patricia's husband. In "What Lies Ahead", he accidentally shoots and wounds Carl while hunting deer, and Otis leads Rick and Shane to Hershel's farm to get help. Guilt-ridden over Carl's wounding, he volunteers to go with Shane to the local high school to get the medical supplies needed to save Carl's life. Both Otis and Shane are injured while fleeing a large herd of walkers. When they run low on ammunition and seem in danger of being overtaken, Shane shoots Otis in the leg, leaving him to be devoured so that Shane can escape. After Sophia Peletier is revealed to be a walker held in the farm's barn, Hershel speculates that Otis found her and put Sophia in the barn before his death. Over the course of the season, the characters slowly come to realize that Shane murdered Otis despite his lies which Shane eventually confesses to when directly confronted by Rick ("18 Miles Out").
- Jimmy, portrayed by James Allen McCune, is Beth's seventeen-year-old boyfriend who resides at the Greene Family Farm. He is shown to be eager to have a gun and attempts to get one from Rick without Hershel's permission. He rescues Rick and Carl from the barn when walkers overrun the farm, but is killed and devoured slowly when walkers overrun the RV ("Beside the Dying Fire").
- Patricia, portrayed by Jane McNeill, is a middle-aged woman who resides at the Greene Family Farm along with her husband Otis. She has some limited medical skills, suggesting she was Hershel's veterinary technician, as she can administer I.V.'s, stitch superficial wounds, and prepare for surgeries, though not perform them herself. She is a quiet, but helpful individual, and shown to be greatly concerned with Otis' well-being. Patricia is deeply distraught over Otis' death. After his funeral, she befriends Lori and Carol, though she exhibits depressed behavior. She is killed by walkers while attempting to escape the farm ("Beside the Dying Fire").

=== The Living ===
The Living, first appearing in "Nebraska", is a hostile group of bandits and manipulators who are heavily armed with automatic weaponry. Few members of the group appeared on screen, except for the scouting members that encountered Rick's group. They are the first antagonistic group encountered in the series and the only one with an unknown status.

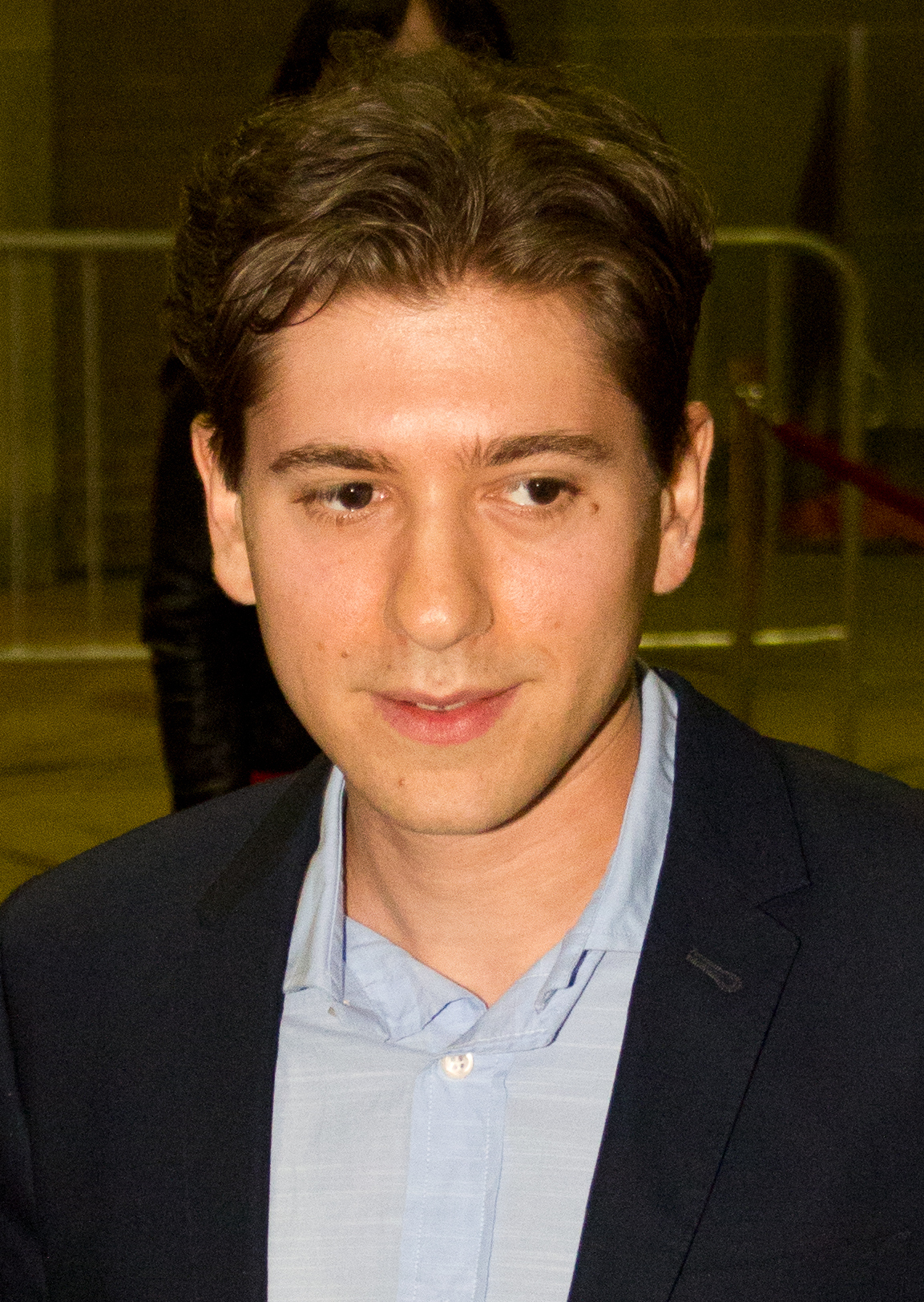
Michael Zegen

- Randall Culver, portrayed by Michael Zegen, is a young member of Dave and Tony's group. He attended the same high school as Maggie and recently lost his mother (presumably when the outbreak broke out). When he impales his leg on a fence, Rick, Glenn, and Hershel rescue him, despite his having shot at them ("Nebraska"). When they realize Randall's group may be dangerous, Rick and Shane disagree about whether to keep him alive or kill him though Randall claims to not be like the rest. At one point, the two men attempt to abandon him around twenty miles away only to learn that Randall knows Maggie and thus where the farm is, and they are then forced to work with Randall to escape. Though Rick later decides to execute Randall, the intervention of Carl and Dale Horvath's subsequent death change his mind. Shane ultimately brings Randall out into the woods and snaps his neck. Glenn and Daryl later discover Randall as a walker, and Glenn impales him through the head with a machete. Randall's reanimation without being bitten alongside Shane's brings to light the fact that everyone is infected and will turn no matter how they die.

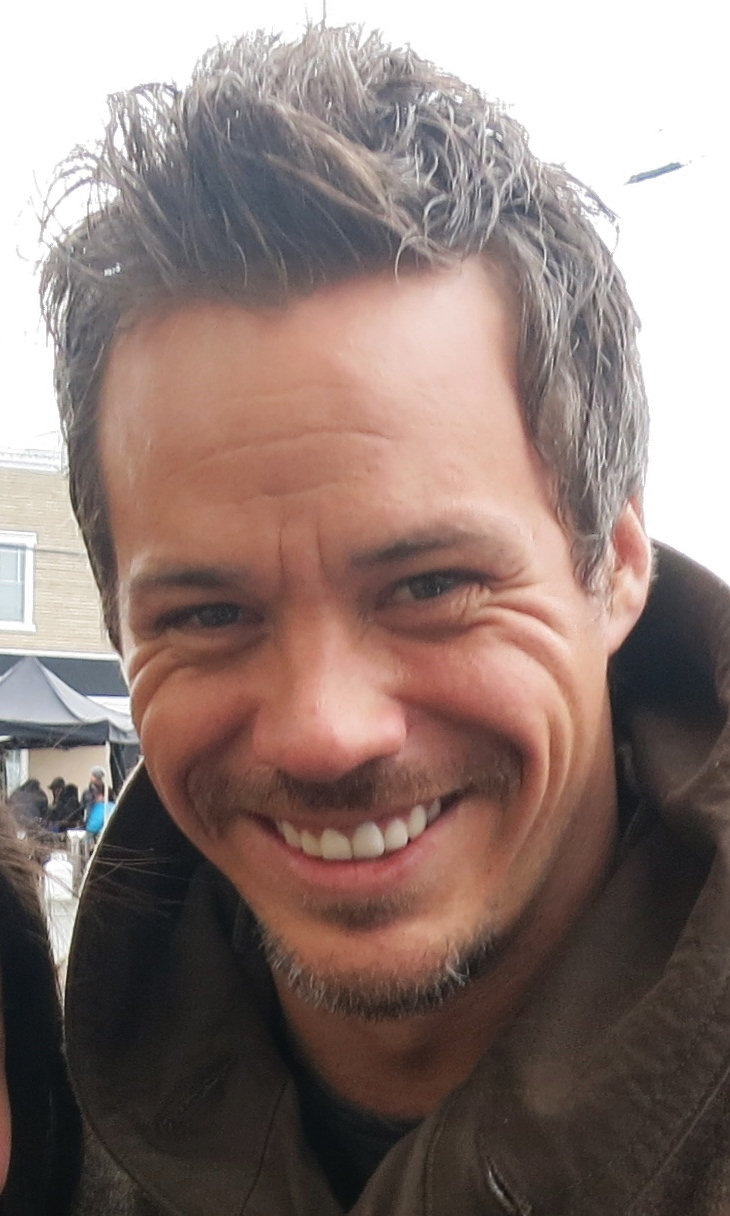
Michael Raymond-James

- Dave and Tony, portrayed by Michael Raymond-James and Aaron Munoz, are from Pennsylvania and are with a group of thirty armed men. They encounter Rick, Hershel, and Glenn in a bar ("Nebraska"). During a conversation, Dave mentions that Tony went "to college" for two years. Tony then walks over to a corner and urinates on the floor. After Rick refuses them safe harbor at the farm, Dave reaches for his handgun, giving away an ambush. After Rick kills Dave in self-defense, he spins around and shoots Tony in the right shoulder and stomach, before Tony can fire the gun he has raised. As Tony slumps against the wall, Rick kills him by shooting him in the head. Rick then takes Tony's gun and some shells from his pocket, while Glenn takes Dave's handgun. Rick, Hershel, and Glenn leave Dave and Tony's corpses in the bar when they flee the town.
- Sean, portrayed by Keedar Whittle, is a survivor from Dave and Tony's group. After the rest of Dave and Tony's gang had heard gunshots, they asked the survivors inside the bar if they have seen their friends ("Nebraska"). Rick answers that they're both dead, which causes a shoot-out to erupt between the two groups. During the shootout, Hershel shoots him in the chest. He survives, After several minutes of moaning in agony and calling for help on the ground, Sean is ultimately devoured by the advancing Walkers attracted by the sounds of gunshots. Hershel attempted to save Sean by shooting the nearest walkers, but more arrived and ultimately overran him. The remains of Sean's reanimation is unknown.
- Nate, portrayed by Phillip DeVona, is a member of Dave and Tony's group who waits outside the bar in his car during the shootout. As walkers approach and Sean is killed, Nate drives off, leaving Randall behind. Nate's status is currently unknown.

=== The Prison ===
Five inmates in the prison survived the outbreak, locked up in the canteen for ten months in the West Georgia Correctional Facility. Until released from the canteen by Rick's group, they were unaware of the walker plague that wiped out a large percentage of the population. Rick tells them they can live in a separate cell block. Although two of them ultimately join Rick's group, they all eventually die.

- Andrew, portrayed by Markice Moore, is a character from the comics, and an inmate-survivor at the prison and Tomas' right-hand man. When Rick kills Tomas, Andrew attacks Rick, after which Andrew flees and ends up in a courtyard, surrounded by walkers, where Rick locks him in. However, in "Killer Within", Andrew is shown to have survived and attempts to sabotage the prison, which leads to the deaths of Lori and T-Dog. Andrew eventually gets into a confrontation with Rick, successfully disarming him. He then orders Oscar to shoot Rick, but Oscar instead shoots Andrew dead.

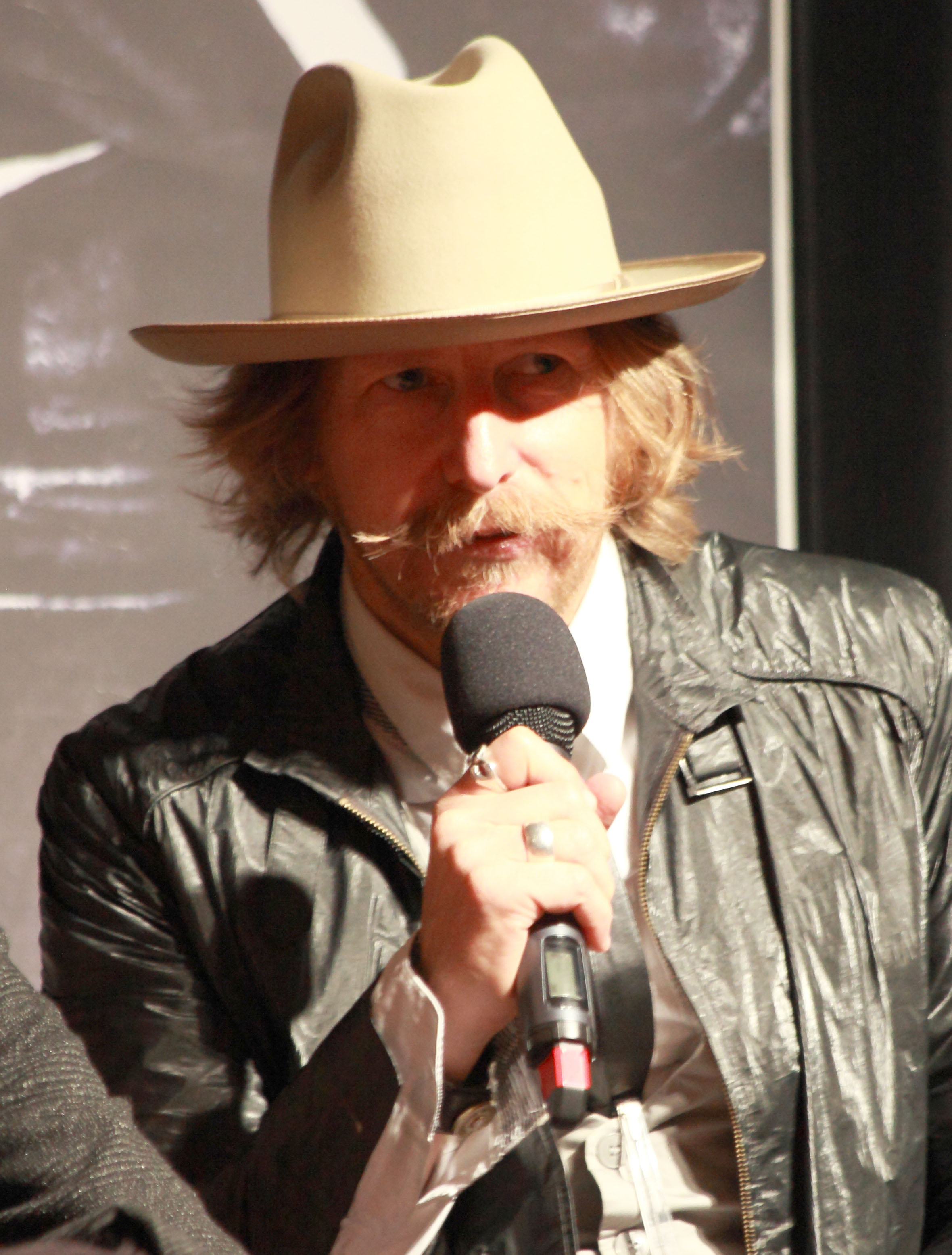
Lew Temple

- Axel, portrayed by Lew Temple, is a character from the comics, and an inmate-survivor at the prison who was jailed for armed robbery. He initially leads others to believe he was in for a narcotics conviction. He appears to be much kinder than his fellow inmates and tends to calm things down. After Tomas' attempt at killing Rick, he and Oscar are accused of collaborating with Tomas and Andrew to kill Rick and his group. After Rick's group dispatches with Tomas and Andrew, Rick's group holds Axel and Oscar at gunpoint. After Axel begs for mercy and pleads that he and Oscar were not in on Tomas' plan, Rick decides to spare him and Oscar and allow them to live in another cell block. Axel later pleads with Rick to let him and Oscar join Rick's group, but his request is denied. After helping the group clear out walkers that Andrew induced to invade the prison, Axel and Oscar are finally accepted into the group. Axel becomes close friends with Carol; as he amuses her with tales about his previous life, he is unexpectedly shot in the head by The Governor, in the opening volley of The Governor's attack on the prison. Carol uses Axel's body as a shield from the assault. In a later episode, Daryl tells Andrea that everybody liked Axel and that he was part of the group. Axel was the last surviving prison inmate.

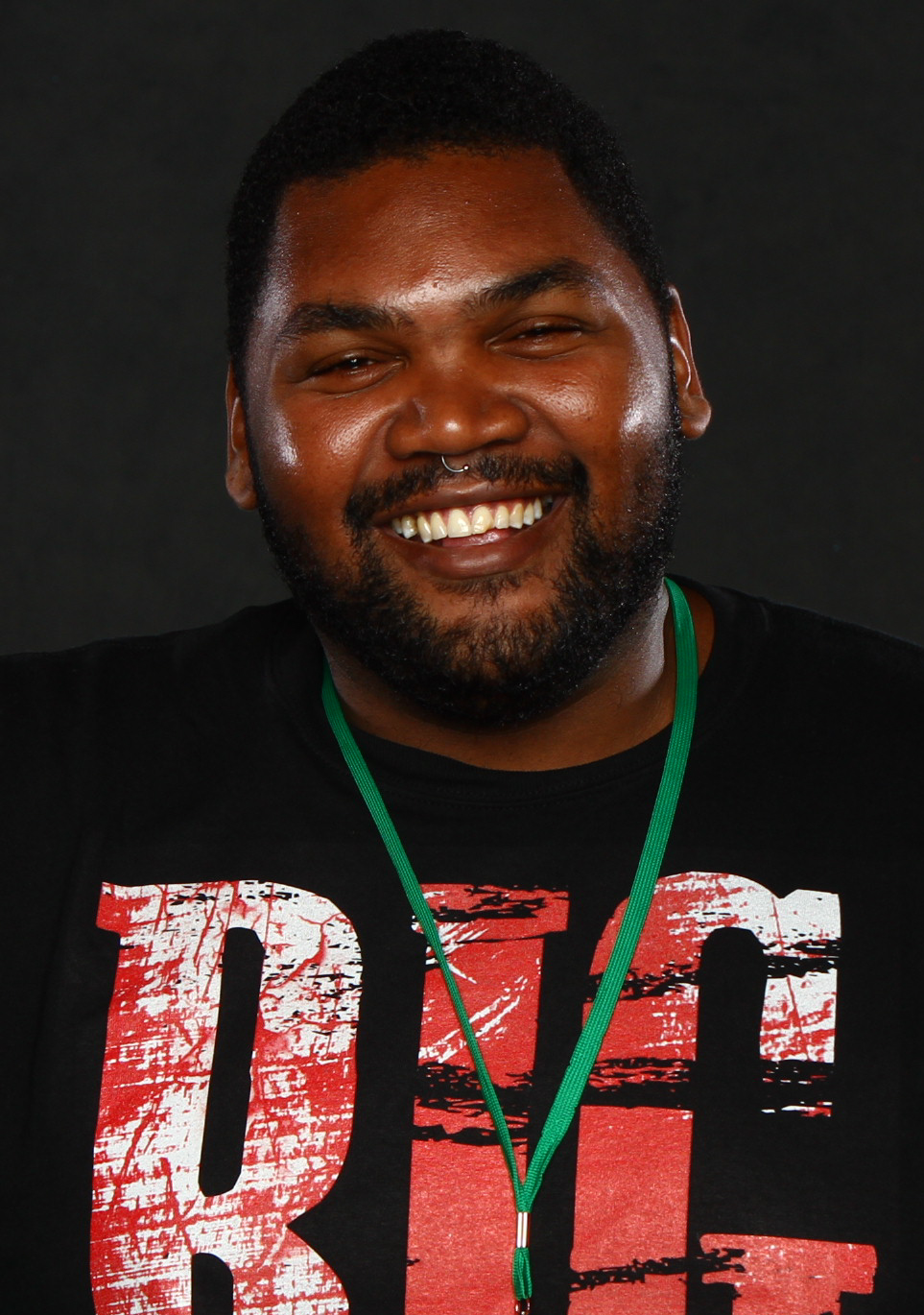
Theodus Crane

- Big Tiny, portrayed by Theodus Crane, is a large inmate-survivor at the prison. He is the muscle of the group, but appears to be gentler and more reasonable than some other group members (such as Tomas and Andrew). While clearing out the cell block, he disobeys Rick's admonition to stick together, and a walker scratches his shoulder blade. While trying to convince the others the scratch has no effect on him, Tomas unexpectedly and brutally smashes his head repeatedly with a blunt instrument, killing him, much to the others' horror.

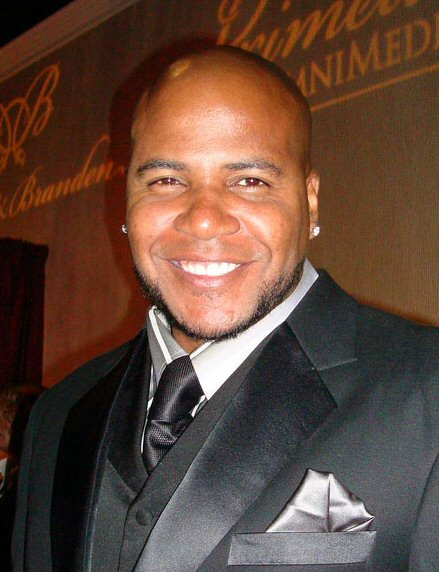
Vincent M. Ward

- Oscar, portrayed by Vincent M. Ward, is an inmate-survivor at the prison who is jailed for breaking and entering. He refuses to beg for his life after being accused of associating with Tomas and tells Rick he can shoot him and Axel if he wants. Rick spares Oscar and allows him and Axel to move to a separate cell block. After being denied entry into Rick's group, and before Andrew induces a walker invasion, Oscar decides to leave the prison. He gains Rick's trust after shooting Andrew, who was trying to kill Rick, and then giving Rick the gun. Oscar soon becomes a vital member of the group and demonstrates proficiency in killing walkers, as well as a fondness for bedroom slippers. During the rescue mission to save Glenn and Maggie, Oscar is shot and killed by a Woodbury soldier, while helping Maggie over the blockade wall.

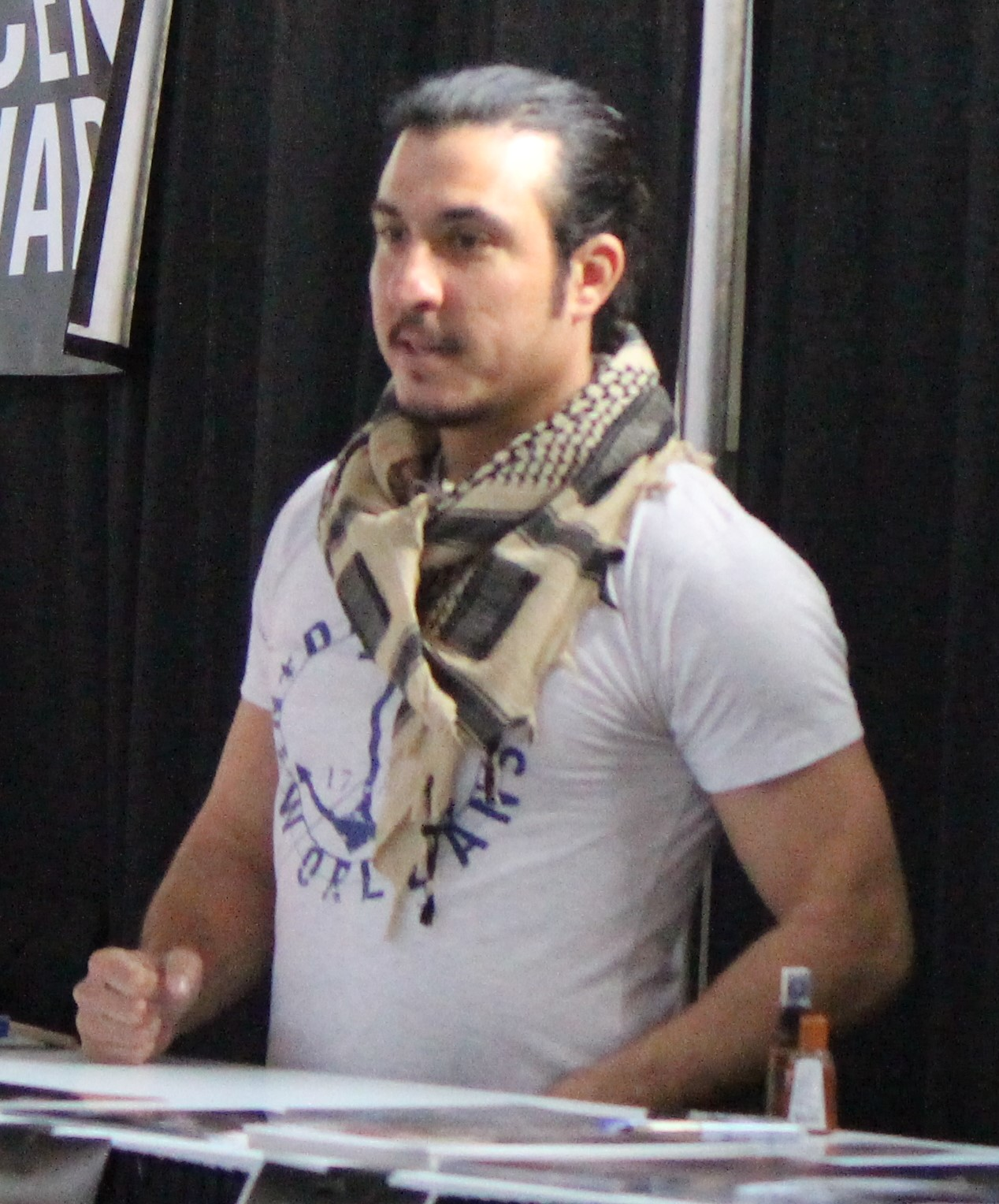
Nick Gomez

- Tomas, portrayed by Nick Gomez, is the leader of the five inmate-survivors at the prison and feared by the others. He is the only prisoner who appears to be violent and hostile towards the new group; he claims the prison belongs to him and orders Rick's group to leave. He and Rick eventually strike an agreement that Rick's group will help them clear another cell block to live in, in exchange for half of the pantry's stores of food. Tomas first proves he is untrustworthy when he later tries, unsuccessfully, to renege on that deal. While clearing out walkers, Tomas violently kills Big Tiny after Tiny is injured by a walker, and Tomas shows no remorse. Tomas then makes two attempts on Rick's life, forcing Rick to kill him.

=== Woodbury ===
Woodbury, first appearing in "Walk with Me", is a town in Georgia of which a few streets have been walled off to keep the town operating. It is led by Philip Blake, who has adopted the nickname "The Governor" from the townspeople. Woodbury had a population of close to eighty people at the time of Andrea and Michonne's arrival, but due to various factors (such as the prison group's attack on the town and The Governor's slaughter of nearly his entire army), the population dwindles dramatically throughout the third season. Robert Kirkman later confirmed that any and all Woodbury characters, who were not brought to the prison are deceased.

The remaining population of Woodbury at the prison community dwindles further throughout the fourth season as a result of the spreading of the flu. As of "Inmates", nearly every resident of Woodbury is confirmed to be deceased, as the bus is apparently overwhelmed and everyone on board becomes zombified (and later put down by Maggie, Bob, and Sasha). It has been confirmed that any other Woodbury resident (except Jeanette) not seen dying either on the bus or at the prison is deceased nonetheless. Thus, the entire population of Woodbury is confirmed to be dead.

==== Soldiers ====
- Crowley, portrayed by Arthur Bridgers, is one of The Governor's enforcers. In "Hounded", after Michonne leaves Woodbury, Merle leads a team to track her down and kill her, however, and Michonne decapitates him. Merle then has Gargulio put Crowley down before he turns.
- Gargulio, portrayed by Dave Davis, is a new soldier to the Woodbury army, tasked with participating with Merle's posse to track down and kill Michonne after she leaves Woodbury. Merle forces Gargulio to shoot Crowley in the head, to prevent him from reanimating. Merle shoots Gargulio dead for disagreeing with Merle's plan to give up on finding Michonne, but to tell The Governor they killed her.
- Haley, portrayed by Alexa Nikolas, is one of The Governor's enforcers tasked with protecting Woodbury's wall. She teaches Andrea how to use a bow and arrows, and tells Andrea she had to kill her father and brother when they turned. She gets angry when Andrea crosses the wall (breaking The Governor's rules) and at Andrea's delight in killing a "biter". Maggie shoots and kills Haley when Maggie and Rick storm Woodbury to save the Dixon brothers.

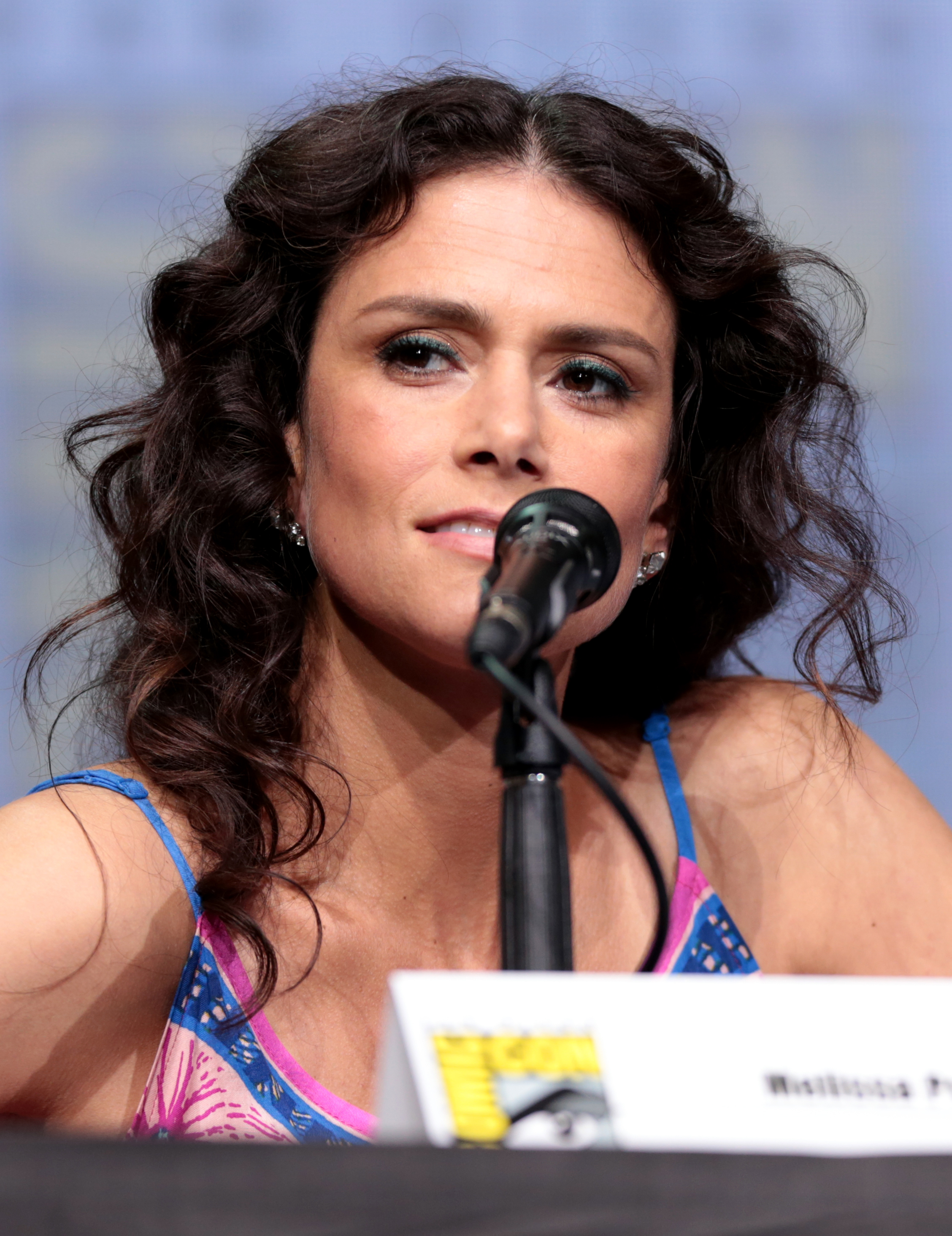
Melissa Ponzio

- Karen, portrayed by Melissa Ponzio, is one of The Governor's enforcers tasked with protecting Woodbury's wall. She is seen trying to leave Woodbury when conditions worsen, and she becomes angry when Noah is forced to join Woodbury's army. She is among The Governor's soldiers, who attack and fail to take over the prison. When the army rebels against returning to the prison, The Governor shoots all of them, except his top henchmen (Martinez and Shumpert), and Karen, who hides under a body and survives. She is found hiding in a truck by Rick, Daryl, and Michonne, and is among the Woodbury citizens, who are taken to the prison. In the beginning of the fourth season, she has started a relationship with Tyreese. When an influenza outbreak spreads throughout the prison, Karen begins to get sick and is quarantined until she gets better. However, Carol kills Karen and burns her body in an attempt to keep the virus from spreading.

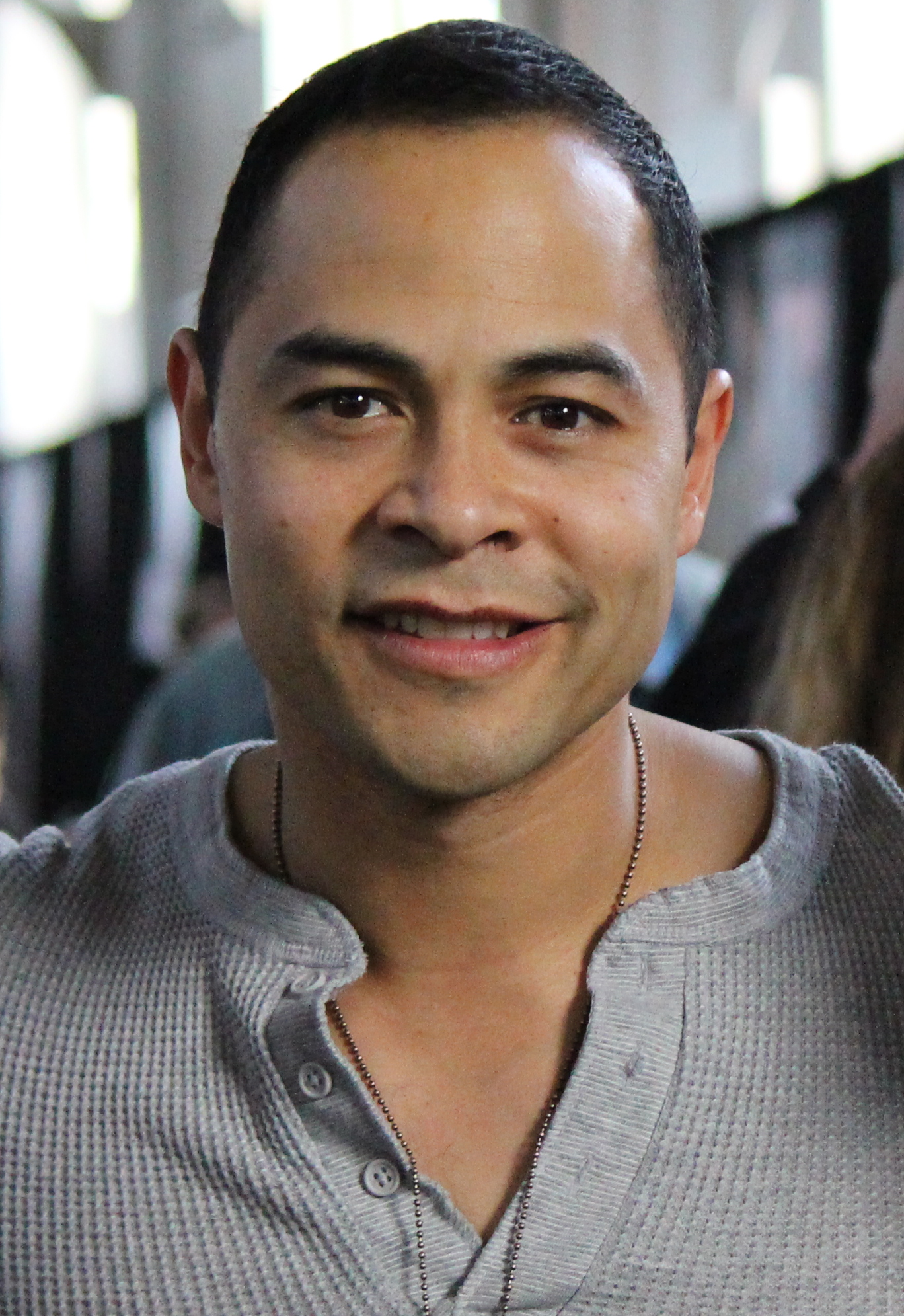
Jose Pablo Cantillo

- Caesar Martinez, portrayed by Jose Pablo Cantillo, is one of The Governor's enforcers. He becomes The Governor's most trusted enforcer after Merle defects. Martinez is a sharpshooter who favors a baseball bat. He is also shown wearing a baseball jersey bearing the number 23. In "Arrow on the Doorpost", he reveals to Daryl that walkers killed his wife and children when the outbreak began. Merle, who acts as Martinez's sparring partner in Woodbury's gladiator-style tournaments, refers to him both as "Brownie" and "Bro" in the same conversation because Merle was a redneck and junkie ("Say the Word"). Martinez assists in all of The Governor's attacks against the prison, although he is shocked when The Governor massacres his own army ("Welcome to the Tombs"). Because Martinez and Shumpert did not disobey him in that episode, The Governor spares them, and together, the three depart. In "Live Bait", which reveals what occurred to the trio after The Governor slaughtered the Woodbury army, Martinez puts down a walker, who approaches The Governor and seems to have fallen into in an indifferent stupor. The next morning, The Governor awakens to find Martinez and Shumpert have abandoned him to fend for himself. Martinez and The Governor reunite when Martinez finds him in the pit trap. As revealed in "Dead Weight", Martinez has established himself as the leader of his group, with seconds-in-command Pete and Mitch Dolgen. Martinez is comforted by The Governor's having apparently changed his ways (evidenced by his having started over with a new family). While playing golf with The Governor, Martinez reveals that Shumpert had died and admits to his worries about keeping the group safe. After Martinez proposes sharing leadership with him, The Governor strikes him down and feeds him to a pit of walkers.
- Noah, portrayed by Parker Wierling, is one of The Governor's enforcers. He is an adolescent who has severe asthma. The Governor enrolls Noah in his army despite his youth and infirmity. Karen and Andrea try to stop this from happening but fail. It is not made clear whether or not Noah is among The Governor's army that attacks the prison. In an interview with MTV, Melissa Ponzio (Karen) confirmed that Noah is not Karen's son (as some viewers believed) and that The Governor killed him off-screen.

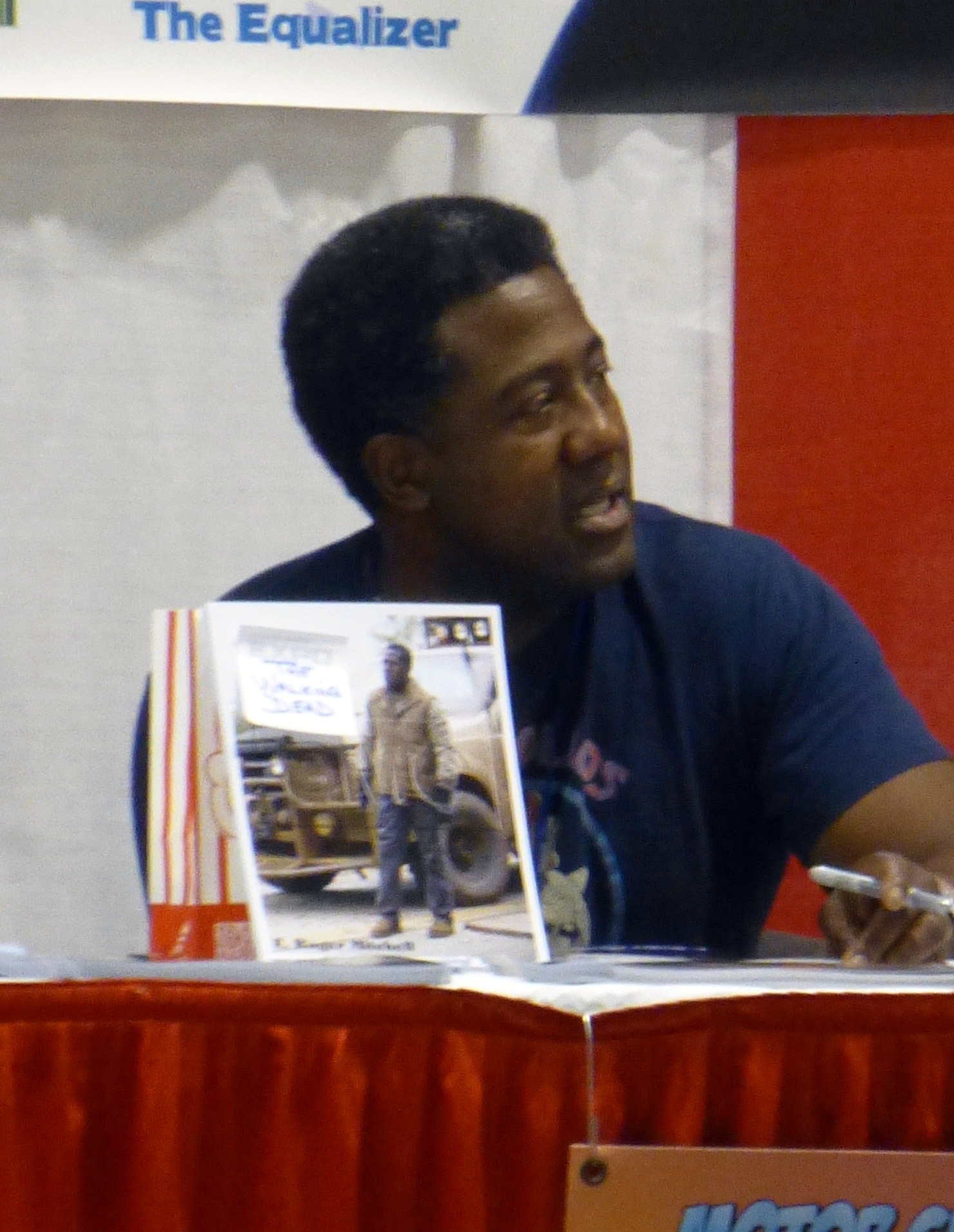
E. Roger Mitchell

- Paul, portrayed by E. Roger Mitchell, is one of The Governor's enforcers tasked with protecting the wall. He tries to break out of Woodbury when conditions worsen. He is among The Governor's men, who attack the prison and retreat when Rick's group overwhelms them. The Governor shoots and kills Paul when Paul protests against returning to attack the prison.
- Shumpert (also known as "The Bowman"), portrayed by Travis Love, is one of The Governor's enforcers. Like Daryl, his weapon of choice is a crossbow (hence, some fans who do not know his name sometimes refer to Shumpert as "The Bowman" or "Bowman"), although (also like Daryl) he is a marksman. Shumpert participates in The Governor's attacks on the prison. When the second attack ends in failure and the army decides not to return to the prison, The Governor guns down the Woodbury soldiers, sparing only his allies Shumpert and Martinez, although the two are visibly stunned by the slaughter. The three then drive off together. Shumpert and Martinez make camp with The Governor, then abandon him and form a group of their own. When The Governor joins Martinez's Camp, Martinez discloses to him that Shumpert had become depressed and reckless following the massacre, and was bitten by a walker, forcing Martinez to put him down.
- Tim, portrayed by Lawrence Kao, is one of The Governor's enforcers. Despite Tim's youth, The Governor had trained him to kill both the undead and living. He also rakes The Governor's lawn and referees Woodbury's gladiator tournament. In "Hounded", after Michonne leaves Woodbury, Merle leads a team to find her. However, she gets the drop on them and fatally stabs Tim in the chest. Merle later prevents Tim from becoming a walker by stabbing him in the brain.
- Jody, portrayed by Tanner Holland, is one of the Woodbury citizens, who participate in the attack on the prison, but are defeated. He, however, is not killed by The Governor in the shootout. Jody gets separated from everyone else and instead finds Carl, Hershel, Beth, and Judith. Carl shoots him dead after Jody moves towards them and tries to hand them his weapon after he was told to drop it.

==== Civilians ====
- Penny Blake, portrayed by Kylie Szymanski, is The Governor's zombified daughter whom he has kept locked in a closet in his house. He feeds her fresh meat and tenderly grooms her. Michonne finds her in a cage and lets her out, but is shocked when pulling the bag off Penny's head reveals she is a walker. The Governor pleads with Michonne not to harm Penny, but Michonne kills her anyway, thus sending The Governor into a rage.
- Eileen, portrayed by Meaghan Caddy, is a Woodbury resident who is pregnant. She has her baby sometime before the events of "Welcome to the Tombs".
- Mr. Jacobson, portrayed by Randy Woods, is a Woodbury resident often seen around the town. Following the disbanding of Woodbury, he and the other remaining Woodbury residents are taken by Rick's group on a bus to the prison. About seven months afterwards, an influenza outbreak sweeps through the prison community, and Mr. Jacobson becomes infected. He loses his battle with the flu and is put down in private by Glenn after reanimating (so as to not dishearten the other sick community residents in quarantine).
- Jeanette, portrayed by Sherry Richards, is a newcomer to the prison community who was brought there along with the other remaining residents of Woodbury. Carol brings her with the other sick residents of the community to Cell Block A to be quarantined. Jeanette insists that she is not sick and her allergies are only acting up, but Carol does not believe her and makes her enter anyway. She is probably treated when Daryl's group returns with medicine. Jeanette is among the prison inhabitants who escape the prison on the bus when The Governor attacks the compound. As of "Too Far Gone", Jeanette is the only named Woodbury character who is confirmed alive. Quite possibly, Jeanette died on the bus after the attack walkers. However, when Maggie, Sasha and Bob come across the bus, Jeanette is not seen as a walker or corpse.

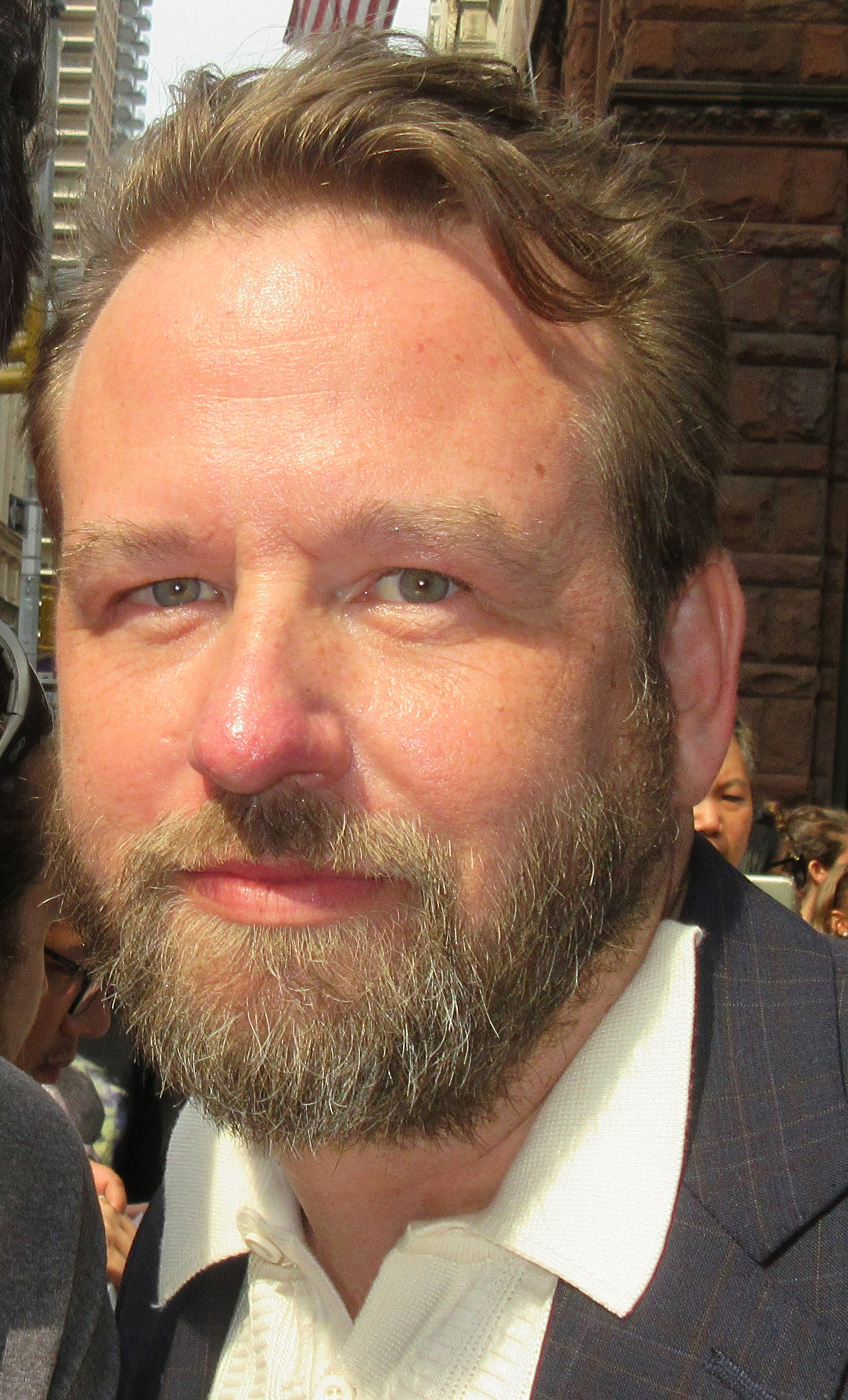
Dallas Roberts

- Milton Mamet, portrayed by Dallas Roberts, is a scientist who serves as one of The Governor's right-hand men. He knew Philip Blake before Philip became "The Governor" and thus had a long-term relationship with him. Although Milton has allied himself with The Governor, he seems to disagree with The Governor's violent and unethical methods. He studies the decapitated bodies of Michonne's pair of walkers and researches the possibility of appealing to Michael Coleman's humanity, after Coleman dies and reanimates. Milton later helps Andrea escape to go try to make peace with Rick, and accompanies The Governor to a peace meeting with Rick ("Arrow on the Doorpost"). He expresses misgivings about The Governor's methods when he learns The Governor plans to kill everyone at the prison except for Michonne. Milton later tells Andrea to escape and, it is implied, he burns the captured walkers The Governor planned to use against the prison group. The Governor realizes that Milton revealed his plan to Andrea, and this causes a rift in Milton and The Governor's relationship. When Milton challenges The Governor to give up the war and forego avenging Michonne's vanquishing of zombified Penny, The Governor restrains and badly beats Milton for his betrayal. He then tasks Milton to kill Andrea, but Milton instead attacks The Governor, who then stabs Milton, mortally wounding him. The Governor locks Milton in the torture chamber with Andrea, deciding to let the reanimated Milton eat her. However, Milton attempts to assist Andrea by planting a pair of pliers within her reach with which to free herself and stab the zombified Milton in the head. Andrea fails to free herself in time, and a zombified Milton bites her before she puts him down. Rick's group later finds his body with a bitten, but alive, Andrea.
- Ms. McLeod, portrayed by Lucie O'Ferrall, is an elderly Woodbury resident who is too arthritic to join The Governor's militia. She is seen getting off the bus at the prison and is not seen after "Welcome to the Tombs". A sick Ms. McLeod is seen running down the stairs in "Infected" and later quarantined in death row. However, she gets killed when the sick people start to reanimate as walkers.
- Rowan, portrayed by Lindsay Abernathy, is a Woodbury resident who guides newcomers Andrea and Michonne around the town after they have recovered from being on the road, and she defends The Governor's enforcers when Andrea complains about seeing a walker "strung up like a Christmas ornament". Rowan is shown to have a sexual relationship with The Governor. She gets killed when Rick and Maggie attack Woodbury at the arena.

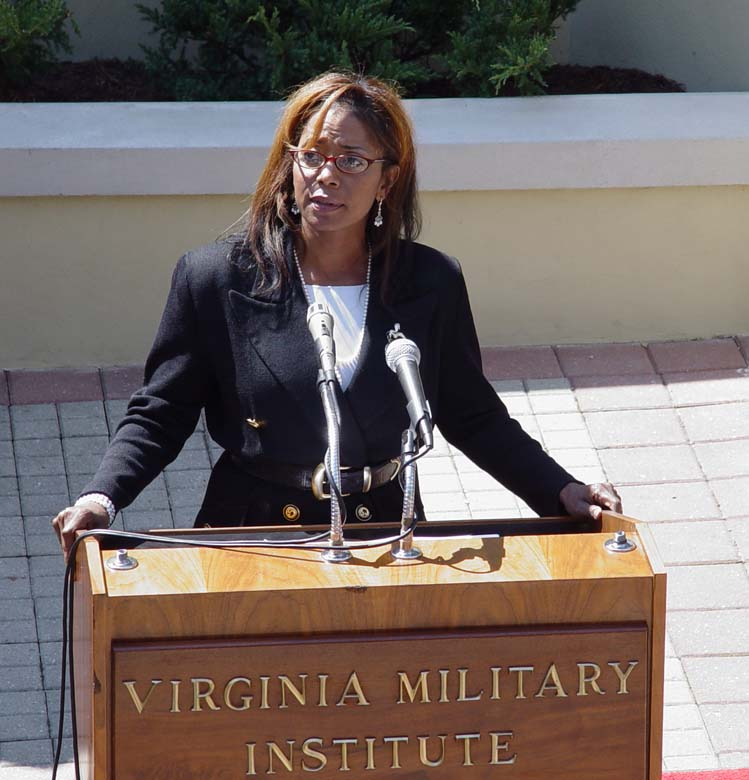
Donzaleigh Abernathy

- Dr. Stevens, portrayed by Donzaleigh Abernathy, is Woodbury's physician. She cares for Andrea, Michonne, and Welles after The Governor has brought them in, for the Woodbury victims injured in the battle with Rick's group, and for The Governor after his fight with Michonne.

=== Prison newcomers ===
After The Governor executes most of the able-bodied Woodbury residents, who had been members of his militia, only the children and elderly townspeople remain at Woodbury, under the watchful eye of Tyreese and Sasha. After Andrea's suicide due to being bitten, Rick and his group return to the prison with the remaining Woodbury survivors (including Tyreese, Sasha, Eryn, Jeanette, Karen, and Ms. McLeod), swelling the prison's population from the original ten to around thirty. Six to seven months afterwards, numerous other survivors have joined the prison community, from various locations and backgrounds. Some of those people include Lizzie Samuels, Mika Samuels, and Ryan Samuels.

The compound is initially peaceful and thriving until an influenza epidemic spreads throughout the community and infects numerous residents, killing many of those stricken. The issue is resolved after a scouting group returns with medicine. Shortly afterwards, The Governor returns with a new militia and executes the captive Hershel, igniting a firefight between the two groups. This battle leads to the fall of the prison community after The Governor tears down the fences.

As a result of the flu and The Governor's assault, the numbers dwindle significantly. The escaping newcomers are found dead on the public transport bus for the prison, while five other newcomers remain alive. Lizzie and Mika are later killed, as well as Bob, and eventually Tyreese. Sasha is the last prison newcomer to hold out, but she eventually dies after taking a suicide pill given to her by Eugene. She eventually becomes a walker, and attacks Negan and his men. Afterwards, Sasha is put down by Maggie.

- David, portrayed by Brandon Carroll, is a newcomer to the prison community who Karen in "Infected" says is from "the Decatur group". In "30 Days Without an Accident", he is seen alongside Karen, killing walkers behind the prison fence. In "Infected", David falls ill during the flu outbreak at the prison and is quarantined along with others (such as Karen) in Cell Block A. The next morning, Tyreese discovers that at some point David and Karen were killed by an unknown individual and their bodies dragged out to the courtyard and burned. It is later revealed that it was Carol, who killed them in order to prevent the disease from spreading further and to put them out of their misery. Tyreese later buries David and Karen next to one another.
- Julio, portrayed by Santiago Cirlio, is a newcomer to the prison community and a mechanic. He falls ill and is placed in quarantine in Cell Block A. Twice he observes the chaos in Cell Block A as Hershel attempts to deal with it. He attempts to escape the prison on the bus, but he is killed right behind Glenn and Maggie, when The Governor's militia attacks the prison.
- Luke, portrayed by Luke Donaldson, is a young resident of the prison community and seen attending Carol's storytime sessions (which are later revealed to be covert self-defense classes for the children). Daryl saves him from an advancing walker during the breach on Cell Block D. When The Governor attacks the prison, he escapes with the children and Tyreese. Beth and Daryl later discover bodies being eaten. They assume it is Luke and Molly's by seeing Luke's shoe next to the pile, though they could be alive.
- Molly, portrayed by Kennedy Brice, is a young survivor who joins the prison community. She attends Carol's storytime session, which is a covert lesson on self-defense for the children. Karen saves Molly during the walker breach in Cell Block D. When The Governor attacks the prison, Molly escapes with the children and Tyreese. Beth and Daryl later discover two bodies being devoured by a group of walkers, assuming it is Luke and Molly's by seeing Luke's shoe, though they could be alive.

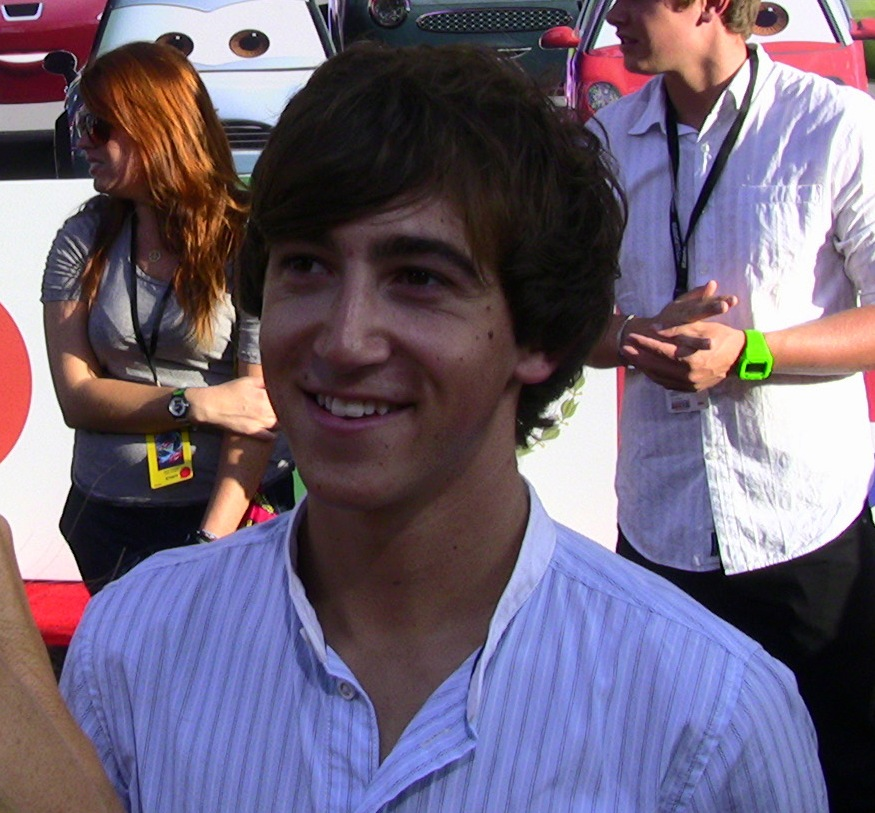
Vincent Martella

- Patrick, portrayed by Vincent Martella, is a new arrival in the prison community. He is around Carl's age and is one of his close friends. Patrick asks to be excused during Carol's storytime session, on the grounds that he is suddenly not feeling well. He dies abruptly later that night and reanimates. A reanimated Patrick bites a sleeping survivor in his cell, which causes the latter to reanimate and ultimately brings about a full-scale attack on Cell Block D. Daryl puts Patrick down once the attack subsides. Patrick is responsible for the deaths of several people before he is put down. Patrick is determined to have died from an aggressive strain of influenza which soon begins to befall the rest of the prison.

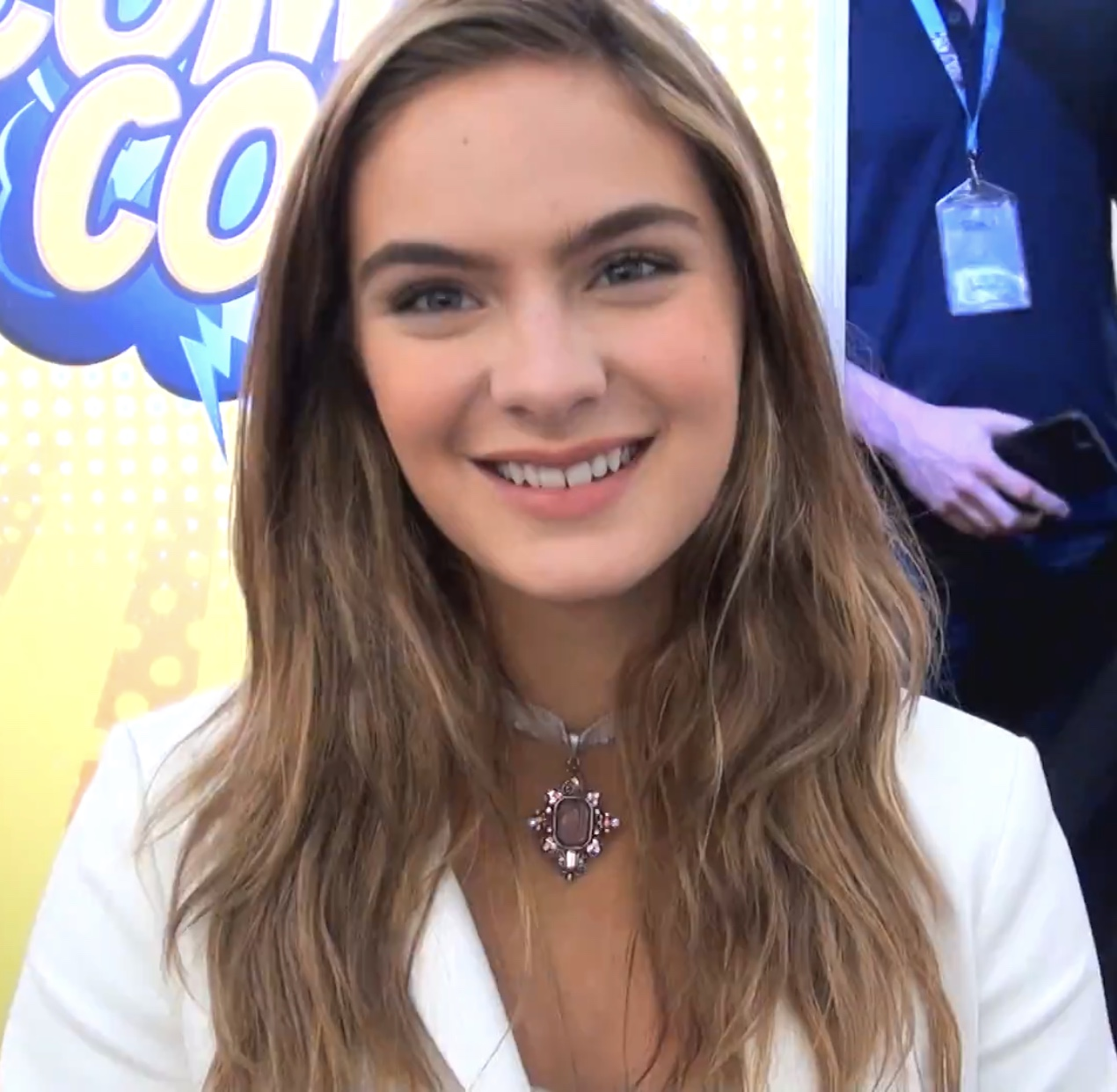
Brighton Sharbino

- Lizzie Samuels, portrayed by Brighton Sharbino, is Ryan's daughter and Mika's sister. She was first seen with other children naming zombies, and later at storytime. During the outbreak her father is bitten, and before dying he asks Carol to look after his daughters. Lizzie expresses intentions to stab his corpse in the head to prevent renanimation, but is emotionally unable to. Carol later tells her she is weak and needs to toughen up. Lizzie later gets the flu and is forced into quarantine. Carol is disturbed by Lizzie's apparently personal connection with walkers. When some infected residents succumb to the virus and reanimate, Lizzie rescues Glenn from a walker by leading it away. After being treated with medicine, she plays with Glenn's blood. When The Governor attacks the prison, she convinces the other children to help in the battle. She and Mika rescue Tyreese from two of The Governor's soldiers, after which she escapes with the children and Tyreese. Lizzie, Mika, Tyreese, and Judith get separated from Molly and Luke. Lizzie also is very sure Sasha is dead. She also shows a disliking towards Tyreese. After Lizzie kills Mika, Carol and Tyreese realize that she is too psychotic to be kept around and has to be executed in order for Judith to be safe, so Carol leads her out to the fields to look at the flowers, and as Lizzie tries to apologize for having threatened Carol and Tyreese, Carol executes her.

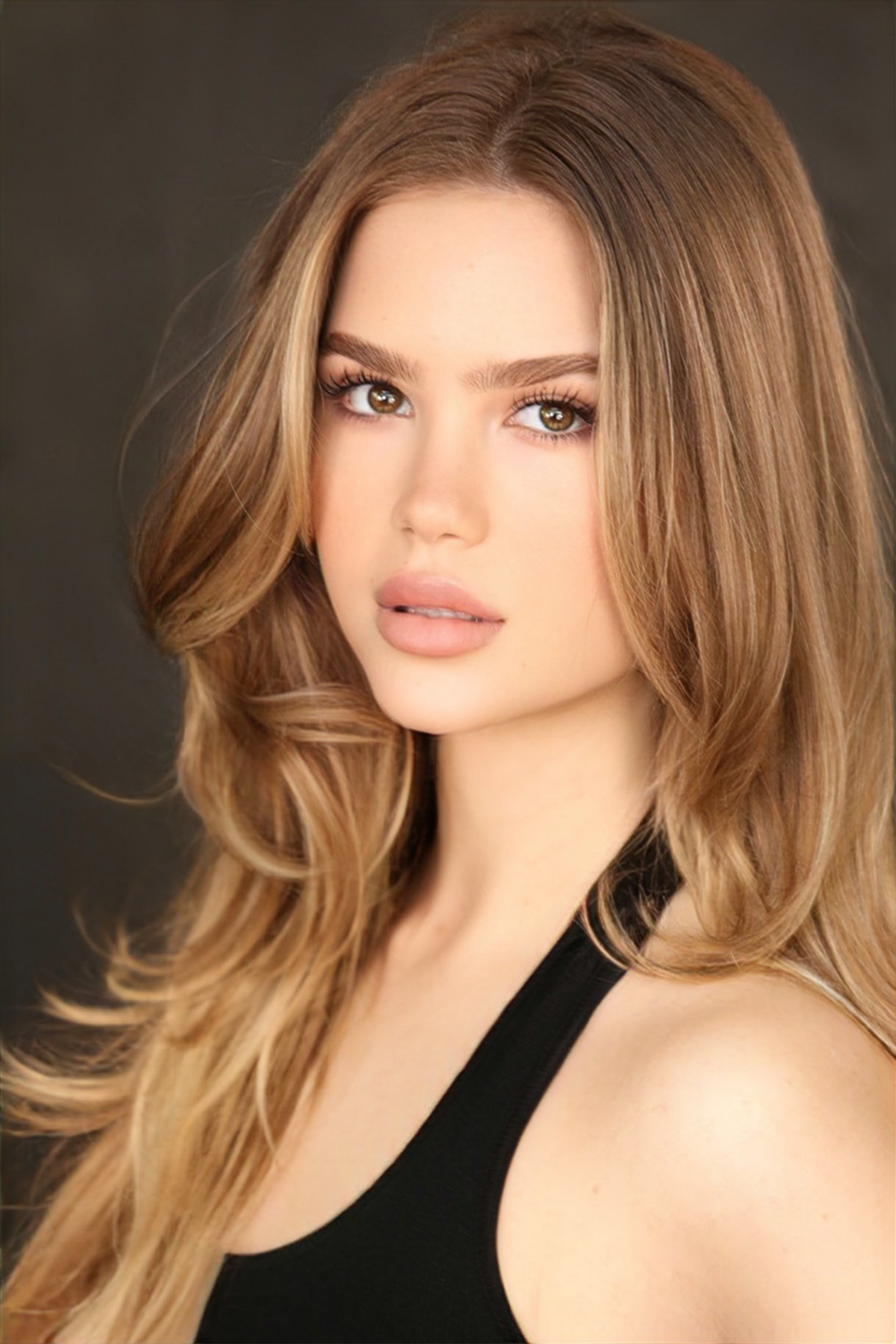
Kyla Kenedy

- Mika Samuels, portrayed by Kyla Kenedy, is Ryan's daughter and Lizzie's sister. She is seen naming the walkers and later at storytime. She loses her father during the outbreak and tries to calm Lizzie when Lizzie panics after being unable to stab her bitten father's corpse in the head to prevent reanimation. She and Lizzie become the adoptive daughters of Carol, as per their father's last wish. When The Governor attacks the prison, Mika and Lizzie rescue Tyreese from two soldiers. She escapes with the children and Tyreese. It is revealed that Mika, Lizzie, Tyreese, and Judith have been separated from Luke and Molly. Mika appears to be saddened by this. Lizzie, believing she will come back, kills Mika and plans to kill Judith until Tyreese and Carol intervene.
- Ryan Samuels, portrayed by Victor McCay, is a newcomer to the prison community. He is present with his daughters Lizzie and Mika, and seen in the library when Carol is conducting storytime with the children. During the outbreak in "Infected", a walker bites him. Carol tries to amputate his arm, but realizes he is bitten in other, inoperable areas, too. Before he dies, Ryan asks Carol to take care of his daughters. When Lizzie is emotionally unable to carry out her desire to be the one to stab Ryan's corpse in the head to prevent reanimation, Carol puts him down.

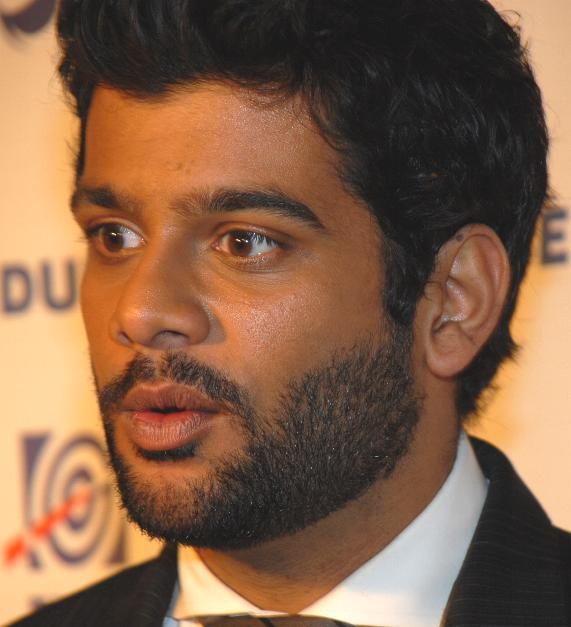
Sunkrish Bala

- Dr. Caleb Subramanian, portrayed by Sunkrish Bala, is a newcomer to the prison community. Not much is known about him, besides the fact that he is a physician, and he and Hershel seem to be friends. After the breach on Cell Block D dies down, Dr. Subramanian assesses what may have caused the outbreak and what steps the group should take to prevent another such disaster. "Dr. S" later comes down with the flu and tells Sasha they have to warn the healthy members of the prison community that the virus is spreading. His condition seriously and quickly deteriorates, although he reveals that he has brought several guns in case of another outbreak. He later succumbs to the sickness after Hershel gives him a checkup. Dr. S later reanimates, and Hershel remorsefully puts him down through Dr. S' locked cell door, after snapping the walker's arm. Hershel later returns to Dr. S' cell and mourns his friend.

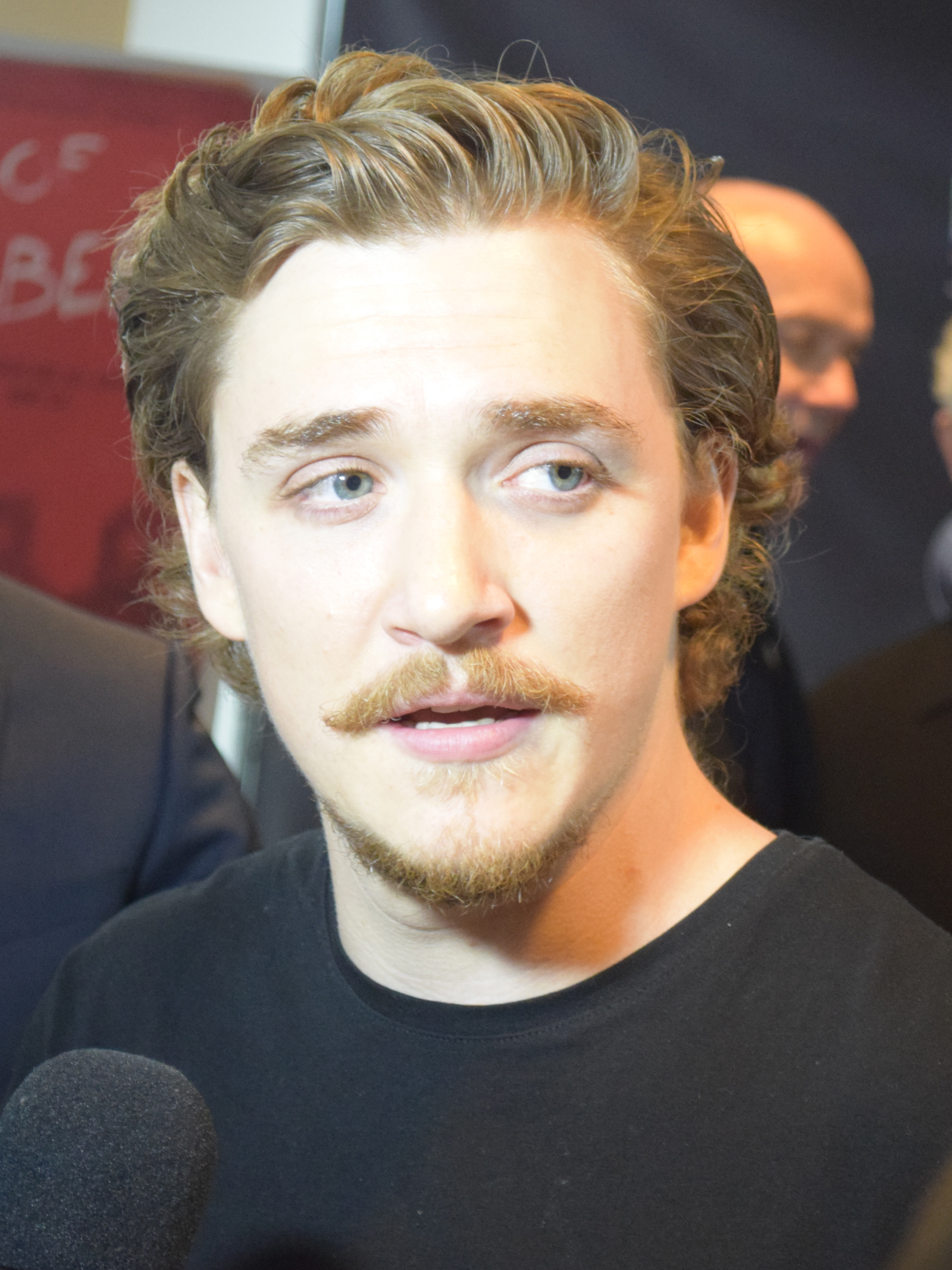
Kyle Gallner

- Zach, portrayed by Kyle Gallner, is a member of a surviving group of college students who join the prison community. He then begins a relationship with Beth. Zach accompanies Daryl, Michonne, Glenn, Tyreese, Sasha, and Bob on a supply run, where he is ultimately killed by a pair of walkers. Beth reacts calmly to the news of Zach's death, much to Daryl's surprise. Later, Daryl uses Zach's high-powered car to take himself, Bob, Michonne, and Tyreese on a run to a veterinary college to get medicine that might save the flu-stricken prison group members.

=== Chambler Family ===
After wandering on his own for six to seven months alone, following the fall of Woodbury and defections of Martinez and Shumpert, The Governor encounters the Chambler Family holed up in their apartment building. The surviving Chamblers later set off with The Governor (who has said his name is "Brian Hariot") to seek shelter elsewhere following the death of David, but The Governor's actions lead to Lilly and Meghan's deaths.

- David Chambler, portrayed by Danny Vinson, is Lilly and Tara's father and Meghan's grandfather. He and Meghan frequently play board games with each other so that Meghan can be preoccupied and distracted from the frightening world around her. David has stage-4 lung cancer and is rapidly approaching his moment of death. Knowing this, Lilly sends The Governor ("Brian Heriot") to a nearby assisted living facility to obtain oxygen tanks to help keep David alive for as long as possible, even if for just a few more hours. Early the next day, David succumbs to his cancer and dies. After he has lain lifeless in bed for several hours, his family and "Brian" enter his bedroom to say goodbye to him. David then suddenly reanimates and grabs Tara. He almost bites her, but "Brian" smashes David's head several times with one of his oxygen tanks, until he finally succumbs. The family is disoriented by this incident, but each of them later recovers. Later, "Brian" and Lilly bury David in a small field behind the apartment complex, and the four of them depart in search of other shelter.

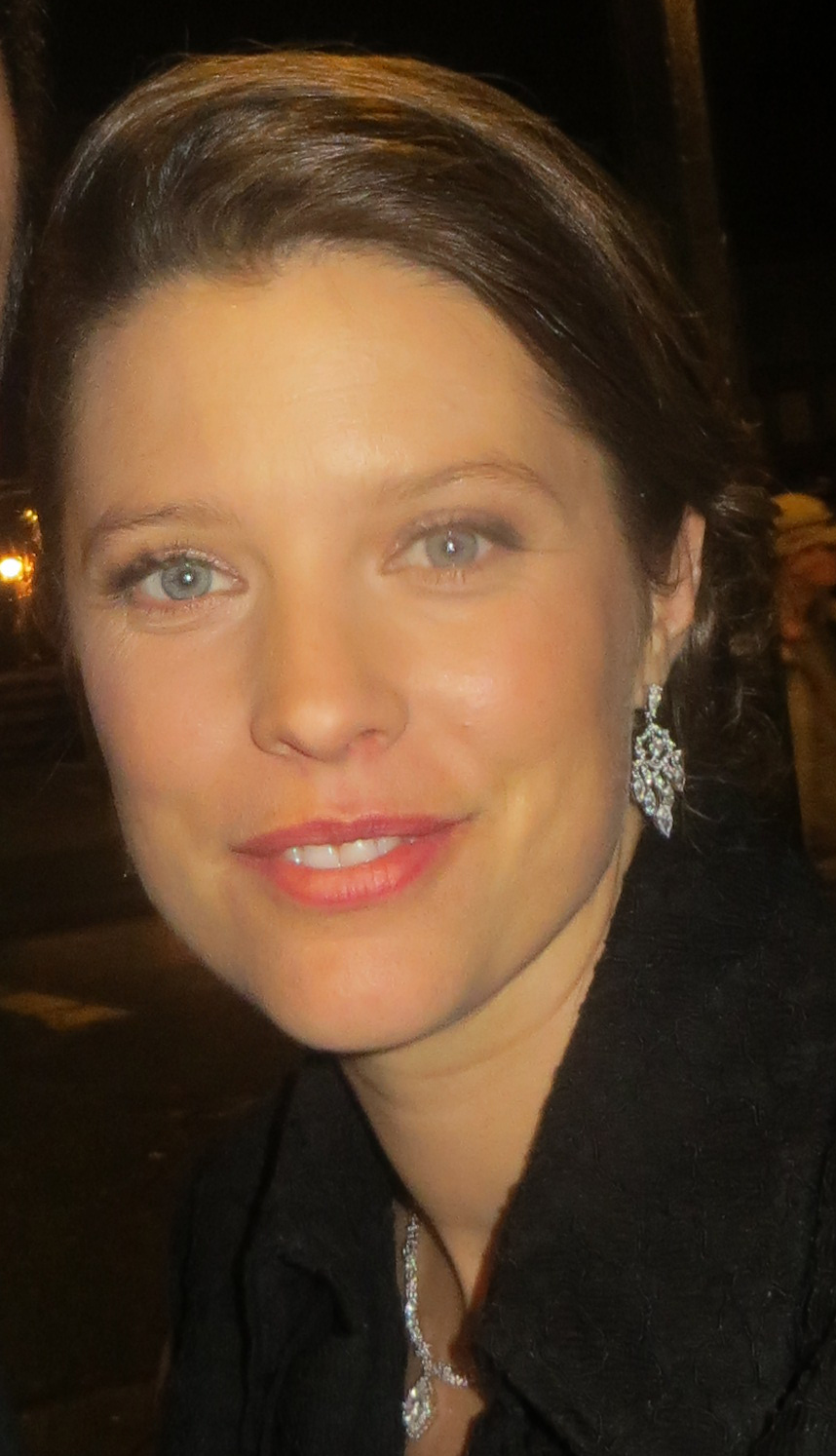
Audrey Marie Anderson

- Lilly Chambler, portrayed by Audrey Marie Anderson, is David's daughter, Meghan's mother, and Tara's sister. She is initially somewhat hostile towards The Governor ("Brian Heriot") and reluctantly allows him to take refuge in her family's building. She slowly comes to trust him, especially after he risks going to a walker-overrun assisted living facility to retrieve oxygen tanks for David, who is suffering from stage-4 lung cancer and will soon die (which she knows will be especially devastating to Meghan). When "Brian" kills the reanimated David, Lilly appears to be upset for a brief while, but soon comes to terms with what happened. After David's burial, the four of them depart in search of other shelter. They spend the night sleeping in a catering truck, and Lilly and "Brian" lay awake talking to each other. Slowly, they then begin to have sex. When the truck fails to start, the group abandons it and wanders on the road, until a swarm of walkers forces them to flee. They arrive at an open field, only to be stopped once again, when "Brian" and Meghan fall into a pitfall trap containing several walkers, all of which "Brian" kills before they can do any harm. Lilly and her family join Martinez's Camp. She is initially against The Governor's attacking the prison, but he assures her that she and Meghan will be safe. She and her daughter are left near a river; however, Meghan is bitten by a walker and dies. Lilly brings Meghan's corpse to the prison, where she witnesses The Governor decapitate Hershel and shoot Meghan in the head. After the battle ends, a bitter Lilly walks up to the dying Governor and shoots him in the head. Tara later mentions to Glenn that she witnessed Lilly become overwhelmed by walkers following the assault on the prison. She was eaten by walkers
- Meghan Chambler, portrayed by Meyrick Murphy, is the young daughter of Lilly, the niece of Tara, and the granddaughter of David. She frequently plays board games with David in order to escape what is happening around her. She and The Governor ("Brian Heriot") bond while playing chess, and she asks about his eyepatch. (Albeit somewhat vaguely) "Brian" tells Meghan the story of how he had tried to protect Penny, but was ultimately unable to save her. The close bond between Meghan and "Brian" is briefly broken after "Brian" kills the undead David, who had died hours before of stage-4 lung cancer. She, Lilly, Tara, and "Brian" leave the apartment after David's burial, and Meghan continues to isolate herself from "Brian". However, her trust in him is regained after he saves her from a swarm of walkers that forces the group to flee. While running with Meghan in his arms, "Brian" falls into a pitfall trap full of walkers. "Brian" successfully kills all of them, while Meghan cowers in a corner, holding her doll, and "Brian" promises Meghan that he will never let anything happen to her. She is bitten by a walker in "Too Far Gone" and dies, after which The Governor shoots her in the head.

=== Martinez's Camp ===
Martinez's Camp, also known as the River Camp, first appearing in "Dead Weight", is a campsite located within rural Georgia on an open field, containing over thirty survivors. It is led by Caesar Martinez until being briefly succeeded by Pete Dolgen and then by a brainwashed Governor, who causes their downfall. The group consists veteran soldiers, former members of the National Guard, and civilians. Overall, they are a self-taught militia who try to survive at all costs. After The Governor secretly kills Caesar and Pete, he gives a speech to the majority of the camp survivors about the prison and its inhabitants, persuading them to force the prison community residents to give up the prison. However, all members (except Tara) of The Governor's newly formed militia are killed by the prison defenders and swarming walkers.

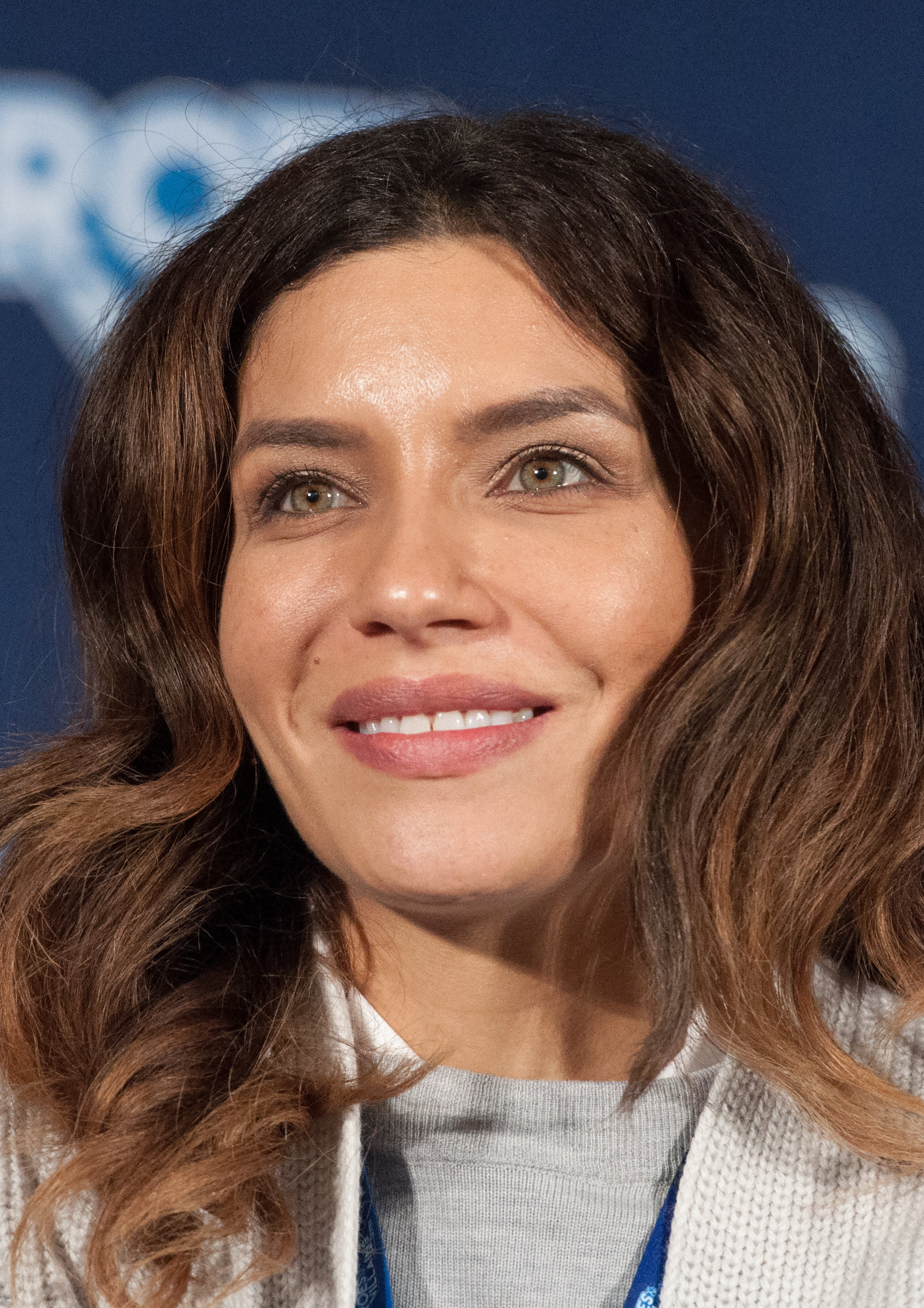
Juliana Harkavy

- Alisha, portrayed by Juliana Harkavy, is a former Army Reserve member who is recruited by Martinez's Camp sometime in the six- to seven-month timespan between seasons three and four. She strikes up a friendship with Tara, which quickly becomes a full-on romantic relationship. The two remain inseparable once they begin dating; Alisha even flees with Tara, her family, and The Governor after The Governor's insistence that he and the Chamblers leave the camp. However, after encountering a roadblock consisting of walkers stuck waist-deep in mud, The Governor returns the group to Martinez's Camp. Alisha participates in the attack on the prison ("Too Far Gone"), but is later shot between the eyes by Lizzie Samuels. Her death, along with Lilly's and Meghan's, sends Tara into a state of depression for a long time.

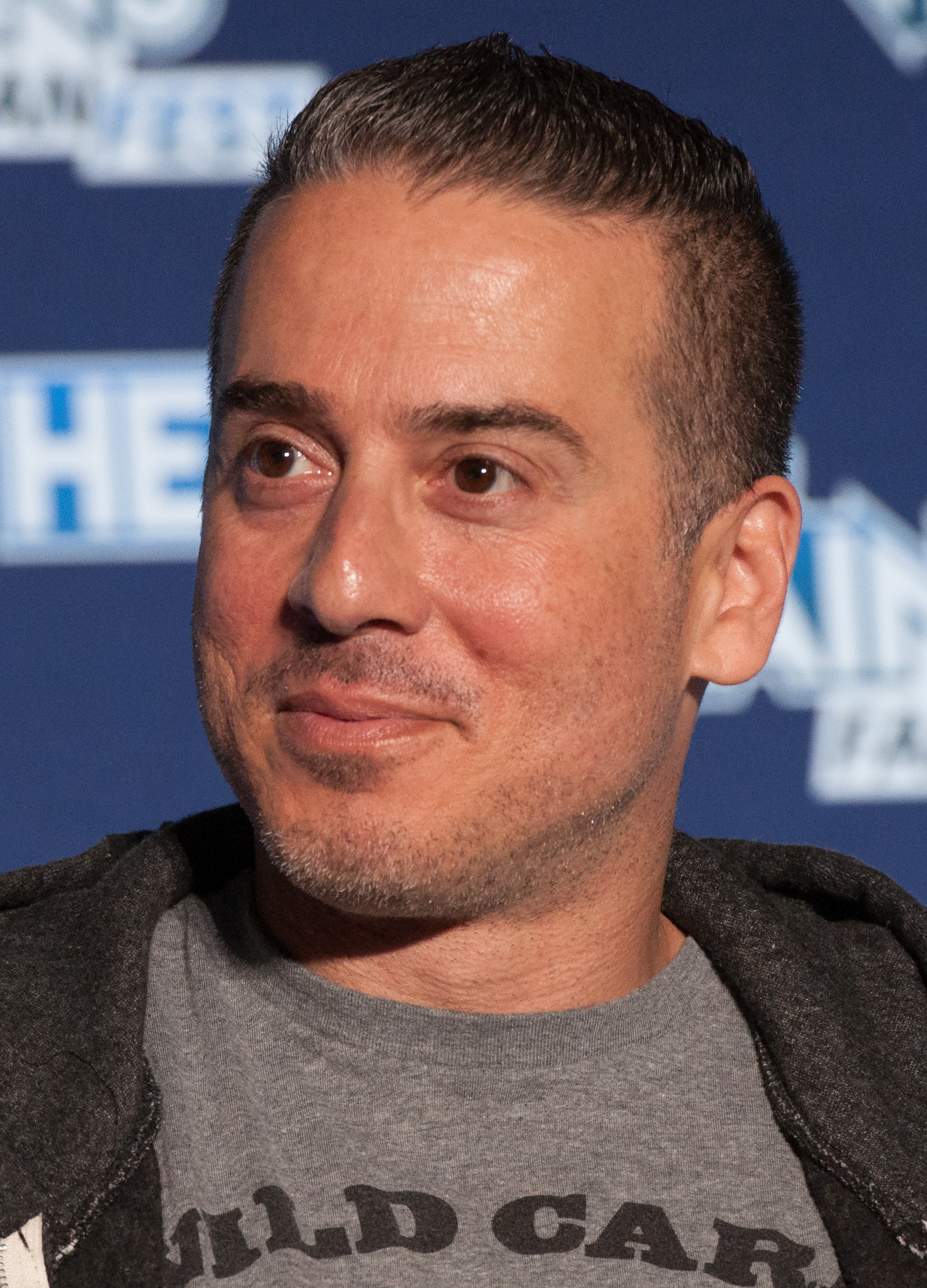
Kirk Acevedo

- Mitch Dolgen, portrayed by Kirk Acevedo, is a member of Martinez's Camp who with his brother Pete is second-in-command after Martinez. Mitch, like his brother, was in the army when the walker outbreak occurred; Mitch was a tank specialist, who said he left the army base in his tank. In "Dead Weight", while on a supply run with Pete and The Governor (then known as "Brian Heriot"), Mitch wants to raid another camp they encounter, but his brother disagrees. After "Brian" kills Martinez and Pete, he enters Mitch's trailer at gunpoint, advises that he killed Pete and explains why, and convinces Mitch to follow his lead which Mitch, though resentful of "Brian" killing his brother, sees his point and accepts. Mitch participates in "Brian's" attack on the prison ("Too Far Gone"), operating a tank and destroying much of the prison. Daryl is able to reach the tank and drops a grenade down the barrel of the tank's main gun, forcing Mitch to escape before the grenade blows up the tank. Mitch turns around, exhausted and defeated, and Daryl shoots and kills him with his crossbow.

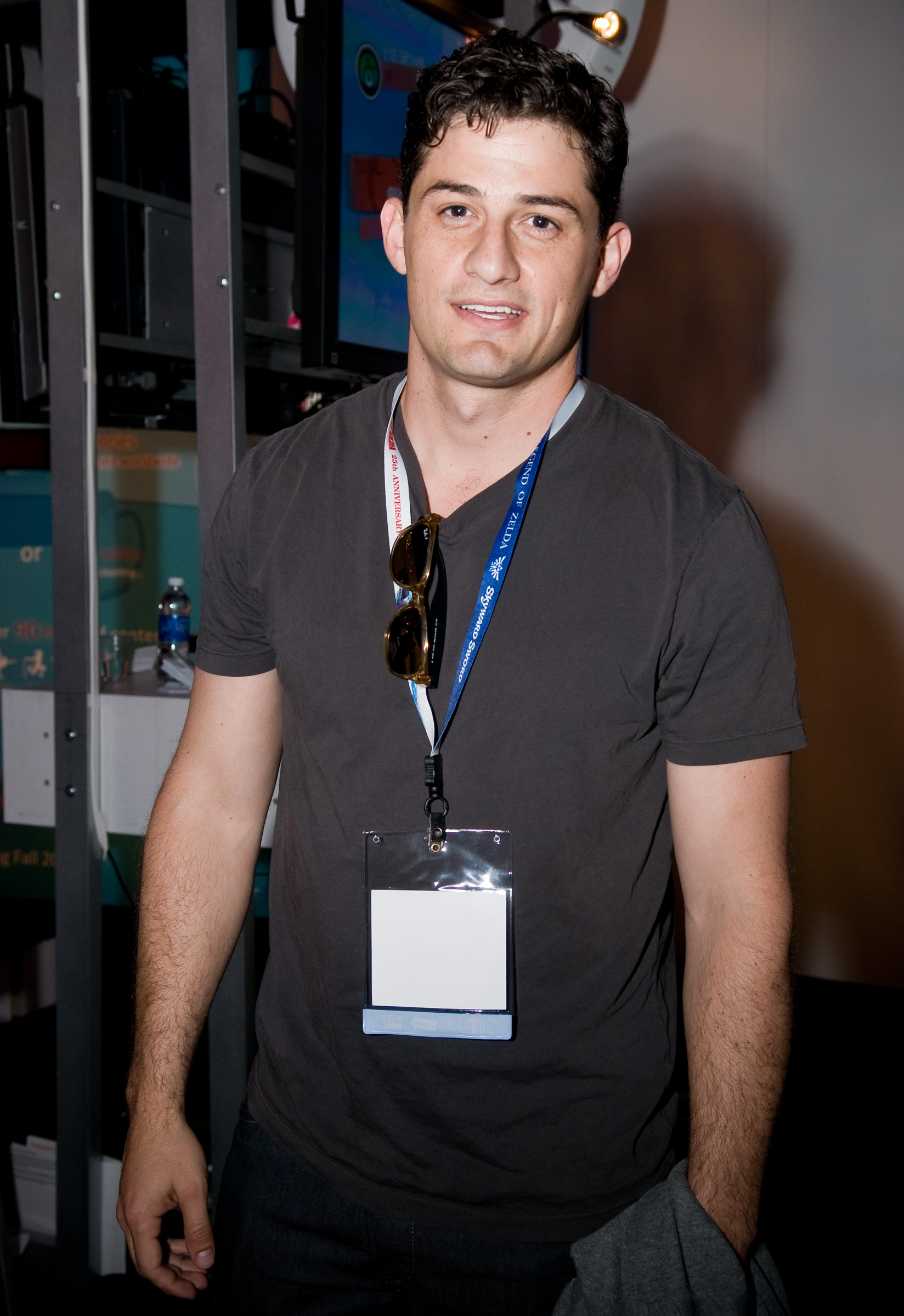
Enver Gjokaj

- Pete Dolgen, portrayed by Enver Gjokaj, is Mitch's brother and a member of Martinez's Camp. After Martinez's death at the hands of The Governor (now known as "Brian"), Pete steps up as the group's de facto leader (which causes unrest amongst many members of the camp). While on a supply run with Mitch and "Brian", Pete thwarts Mitch's desire to raid a camp they encounter in the woods, as Pete is unwilling to rob the group and prefers to find supplies another way. Unwilling to follow a leader, who is unwilling to do whatever's necessary for the group to "survive", "Brian" murders Pete by stabbing him in Pete's trailer. He then dumps the body in the nearby lake. Brian later returns to find Pete's undead body submerged and anchored at the bottom of the lake.

=== The Claimers ===
The Claimers, first appearing in "Claimed", is a dangerous group of heavily armed men who raid homes in order to search for supplies and weapons. Over time, however, the group gradually descends into a sinister lifestyle where they eventually became a group of marauders. They begin to commit numerous horrific actions which include murdering innocent survivors, savagely raping several women, and sadistically hunting their victims.

- Billy, portrayed by Eric Mendenhall, is a member of the Claimers. He is killed by Daryl during their fight with Rick's group.
- Dan, portrayed by Keith Brooks, is a member of the Claimers whom, during the assault on Rick's group, grabs Carl with the intention of raping him. He is the last-surviving Claimer, and following the killing of the rest of the Claimers, he is stabbed to death by Rick in retribution for his attempted rape of Carl.
- Harley, portrayed by J. D. Evermore, is a member of the Claimers who is shot dead by Michonne after the deaths of Joe and Tony.

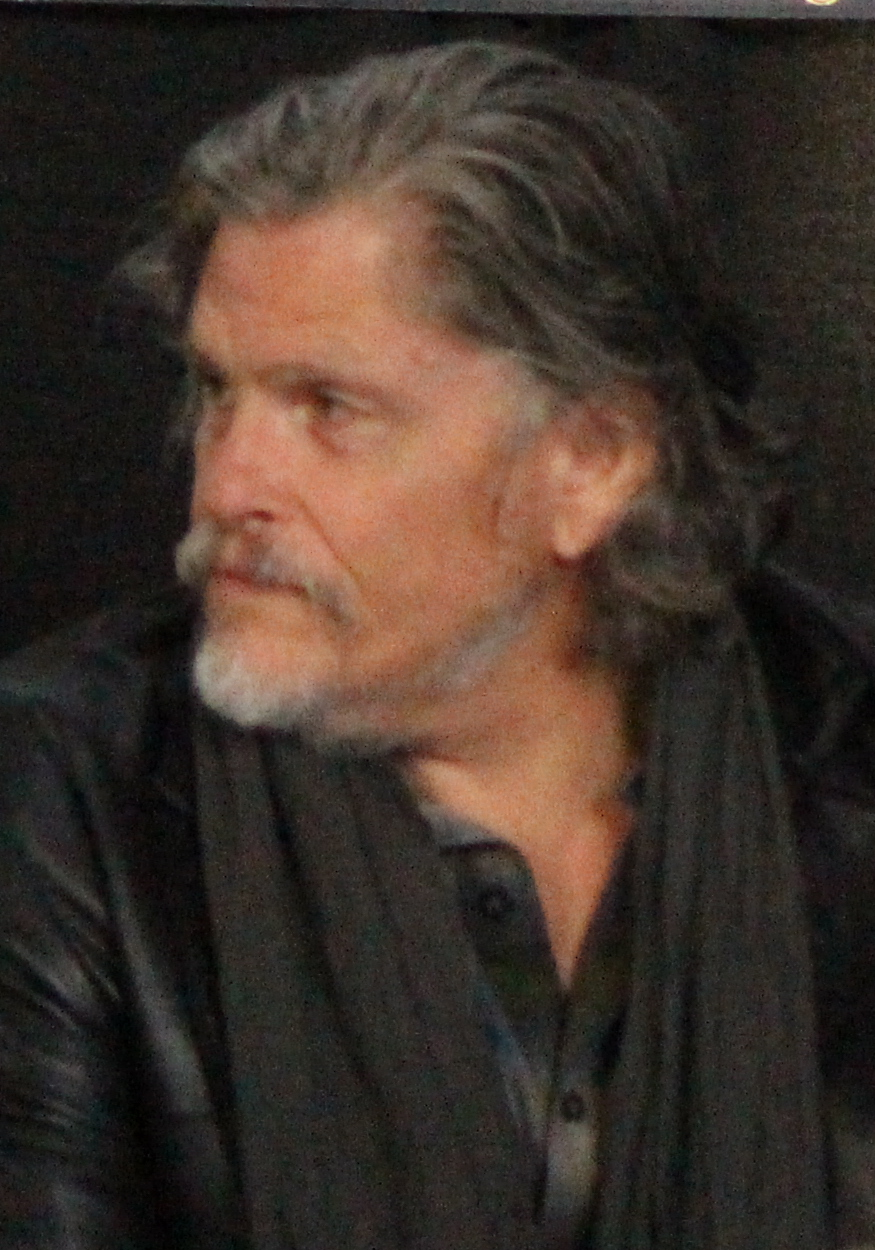
Jeff Kober

- Joe, portrayed by Jeff Kober, is the leader of the Claimers, first seen by Rick on the porch of the house that they were raiding in "Claimed". He later appears in "Alone", when his group finds Daryl exhausted on the road after he is separated from Beth. Despite a close encounter with Daryl punching Joe and almost shooting him, Joe is impressed by Daryl's use of a crossbow and decides to recruit him. Joe's group eventually catches Rick, Michonne and Carl, with the intent to avenge Lou's death. During the ensuing fight, Joe ignores Ricks request and joyfully informs him that he will personally kill him after Daryl is beaten to death, and Michonne and Carl are raped and killed which will put an end to their conflict. As Joe is laughing sadistically, Rick head-butts Joe causing him to shoot his gun in reflex (and missing). Rick then punches Joe in the face. Joe quickly counters Rick's punch and knocks Rick to the ground and proceeds to kick him while he is down. Joe grabs Rick and locks him tightly. Joe taunts Rick, Rick kills Joe by ripping his jugular out with his teeth. Joe's entire group are then killed by Rick, Daryl and Michonne seconds later after being distracted by Joe's death.
- Len, portrayed by Marcus Hester, first appears when the Claimers raid a large house where Rick is hiding. Rick is forced to hide under the bed he was sleeping on. Another member of the group, Tony, chooses to sleep on the bed, leaving Rick trapped. Len enters the room and wakes up Tony. He demands that he be given the bed, but when Tony refuses and says it is claimed, Len knocks him out of the bed and strangles him into unconsciousness before taking the bed for himself. After framing Daryl for stealing his half of a rabbit, leading the group to question his honesty, Len is severely beaten before being killed by an unspecified member of the group. His bloodied corpse, with an arrow in his forehead, is discovered outside by Daryl as they leave the warehouse they had spent the night in.
- Lou, portrayed by Scott Dale, is a slightly overweight member of the Claimers who is discovered in the bathroom by Rick after he escapes from hiding under the bed. In order to stay hidden and undetected by the other members of the group, Rick quickly fights Lou and ultimately begins strangling him to ensure his escape. Although Lou attempts to grab a pair of scissors on the nearby counter to stab Rick with, Rick continues to strangle him to death before escaping out the window. Shortly afterwards, Lou's reanimation provides a distraction for Joe and the other members as Rick escapes and regroups with Carl and Michonne, who were just outside the house. Lou's death is the primary reason that Joe and his group are actively pursuing Rick, tracking him along the train tracks to Terminus.
- Tony, portrayed by Davi Jay, is the member of the Claimers that is responsible for Rick becoming trapped, when he takes a nap on the bed that Rick is hiding under. When Len comes into the room and tries to take the bed, Tony says that it is claimed, prompting Len to knock him to the floor. While he is being strangled into unconsciousness, he sees Rick under the bed, but is unable to warn Len before he passes out. During the fight between Joe's group and Rick's group, Tony is shot dead by Michonne after being distracted by Rick killing Joe.

=== Terminus ===
Terminus is a sanctuary that is first mentioned in the second half of the fourth season over a radio broadcast heard by Daryl, Michonne, Tyreese, and Bob while driving in Zach's car. After the fall of the prison, the small factions of prison residents, who survive the assault find the signs directing survivors towards Terminus, and each group slowly begins to make its way there. The exact location of Terminus is finally revealed in "Us", where it appears to be a relatively vibrant, well-secured settlement, but in actuality hides a dark and brutal secret. It is later confirmed that Terminus is indeed a cannibalistic group, where they kill and then carve up any new arrivals that refuse to join them or prove to be a threat. After Terminus is destroyed by Carol's siege in "No Sanctuary", only six residents survive and escape, becoming known as The Hunters.

- Alex, portrayed by Tate Ellington, is the brother of Gareth and shows Rick's group around Terminus. He is held hostage after Rick becomes suspicious about the clothes the residents are wearing. Alex then tries to reason with Rick and the others to let him go, but is accidentally shot shortly after by Mary as she tried to kill Rick.

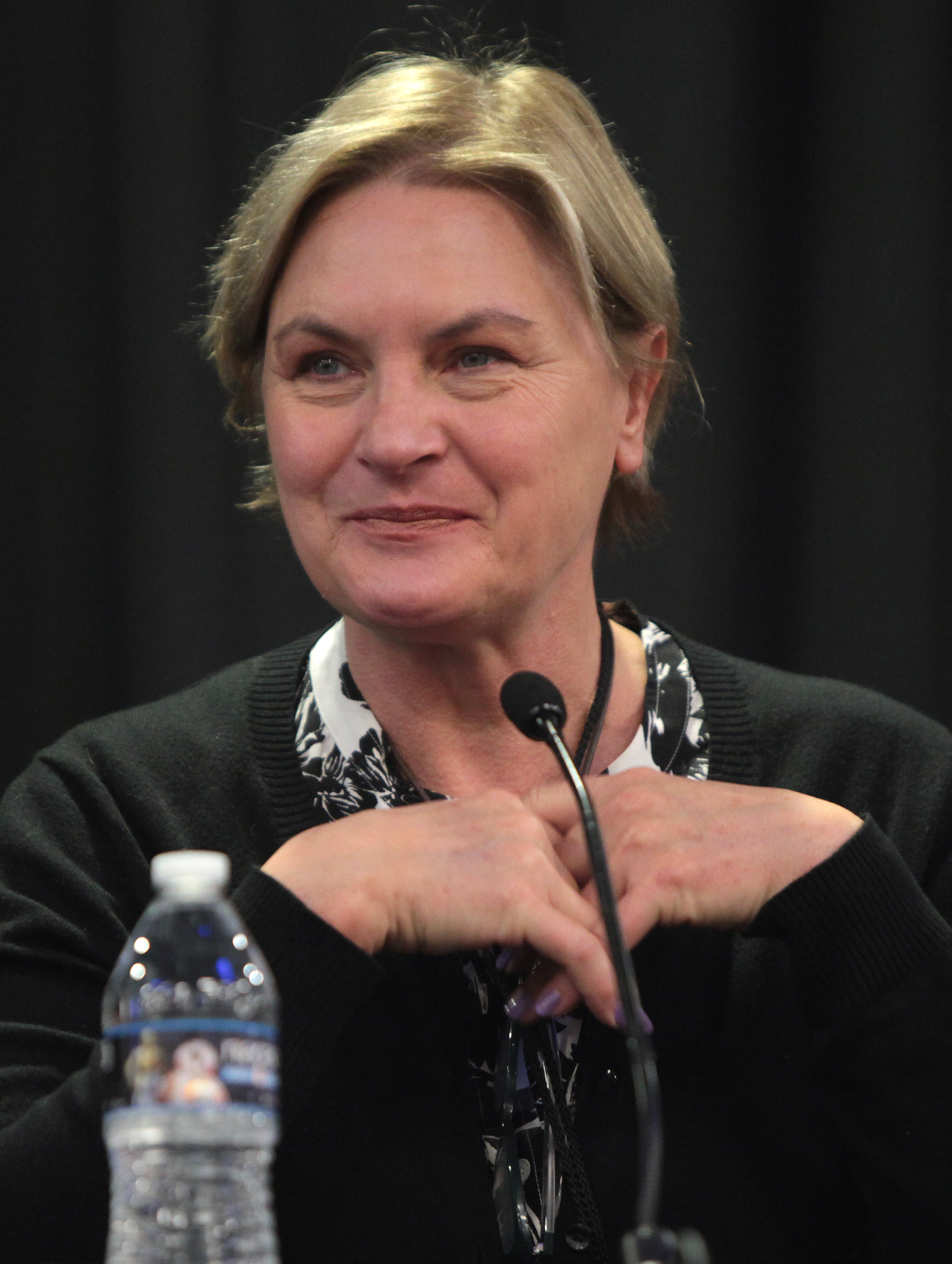
Denise Crosby

- Mary, portrayed by Denise Crosby, is the mother of Gareth and Alex who greets Glenn, Maggie, Sasha, Bob, Tara, Abraham, Eugene and Rosita when they arrive at Terminus. After Carol attacks Terminus to rescue Rick's group, she encounters Mary. Carol holds Mary at gunpoint, demanding to know where the group is holding Rick and the others. Mary explains that Terminus originally was a sanctuary, but it became a place where they would lure people to take their possessions and ultimately, eat them. Carol shoots her in the leg and allows a group of walkers to devour the crippled Mary. In "Coda", Gabriel discovers Mary's bible at the Hunters' campsite outside the elementary school, with the inscription "Mary B". on the first page.

=== The Hunters ===
After Carol destroys Terminus, Gareth and his people begin to hunt for Rick's group in order to take revenge, now known as The Hunters.

- Albert, portrayed by Benjamin Papac, is one of the Hunters who is killed in the church when he and Mike are immediately shot through the head.
- Martin, portrayed by Chris Coy, is one of the few survivors of Terminus after it is destroyed by Carol's siege. He is first discovered by Carol and Tyreese while he is alone on a scouting mission, and they overhear him talking on the radio about the hostages that Terminus has just taken. When they realize that he has kidnapped Michonne and Carl, they take him hostage in a small, abandoned cabin. While Carol leaves to attack Terminus, Tyreese stays with Judith to watch over a restrained Martin. During his captivity, Martin continues to lecture Tyreese about how the idea of "good vs. evil" means nothing in this world, and that if people like Tyreese try to be nice, they will not survive. Later, as the cabin is overrun by walkers and Tyreese is keeping watch, Martin breaks free and grabs Judith, ordering Tyreese outside. However, Tyreese overpowers the walkers, breaks back inside, and knocks Martin unconscious, refusing to kill him. Martin then reappears with Gareth and 4 other Terminus survivors after they kidnap Bob and then sneak into the church to kill the members of Rick's group. When Rick and the others ambush them, Martin is the last to drop his weapon after Gareth orders him to surrender. Martin is then stabbed to death by Sasha when Gareth and the others are slaughtered by Rick's group. Later, when Tyreese is dying of a walker bite, Martin is the first person to appear to Tyreese as a hallucination, where he mockingly tells Tyreese that he will die because he still tried to be a "good guy", and that many of the recent failures were because of his refusal to kill Martin.
- Mike, portrayed by Chris Burns, is one of the Hunters who is killed in the church when he and Albert are immediately shot through the head.
- Theresa, portrayed by April Billingsley, is one of the Hunters who is killed in their attempted siege on the church when Michonne bashes her skull in with the butt of her rifle.
- Greg, portrayed by Travis Young, is one of the Hunters who is killed in the church when Abraham bludgeons him to death with the butt of his rifle.

=== Grady Memorial Hospital ===
Grady Memorial Hospital, first appearing in "Slabtown", is revealed to be the home of a sheltered group of survivors, who believe that military assistance will eventually come to them after a certain period of time. The hospital is run under a strict authoritarian regime by a group of corrupt police officers. The status of this group remains unknown.

- Dr. Steven Edwards, portrayed by Erik Jensen, is the hospital's sole doctor who has a polite but nervous demeanor to him. He noticeably disapproves of the harsh methods by which Officers Lerner and Gorman run the hospital, but despite his objections, his position is valued by the officers as the only medical professional on hand. He initially cares for Beth as she recovers and does his best to protect her from the officers, saying that he refuses to leave because, as ruthless as the officers are, it is still better inside the hospital than out in the real world. However, Beth grows suspicious of him when he tells her to give the drug Clozapine to Gavin Trevitt, a patient, who is also a doctor, as the drug ends up killing him. Although Dr. Edwards insists that he actually said Clonazepam, Beth is certain that he told her the name of the wrong drug on purpose. She accuses him of having the other doctor poisoned in order to retain his valued status as the only doctor, which he denies. He later helps Beth save Carol's life by telling her which medication she will need to give Carol. After the deaths of Beth and Lerner, Edwards offers to let Rick's group stay at the hospital, but Rick refuses.
- Officer Gorman, portrayed by Cullen Moss, is Officer Lerner's second-in-command and one of the officers who saved Beth. Although he appears to have a more polite demeanor during his initial introduction, Beth quickly discovers that his idea of being repaid for his services is sexual relations with the female patients, as he has already apparently raped Joan. He makes similar advances towards Beth, finally catching her alone in Lerner's office where, unbeknownst to him, Joan has committed suicide and is about to turn. There, he finally begins to force himself on Beth, attempting to blackmail her with her attempt to steal a key from Lerner's office, and just as he moves in, Beth hits him in the back of the head with a glass bottle. When he falls to the floor, the reanimated Joan instantly crawls onto him and kills him by biting his neck while Beth escapes.

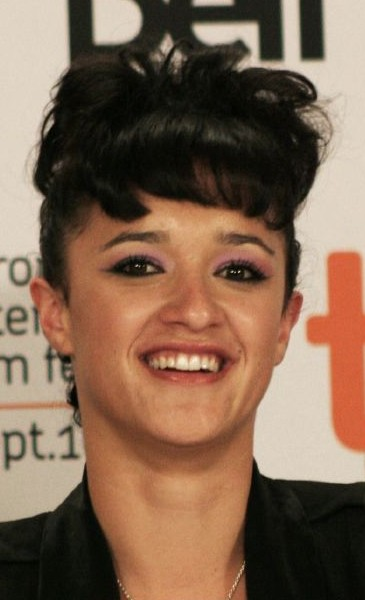
Keisha Castle-Hughes

- Joan, portrayed by Keisha Castle-Hughes, is female patient who attempts to escape the hospital, only to be bitten in the arm by a walker. When she is brought back inside by Officer Lerner, Lerner demands that Dr. Edwards save her by amputating her arm with a metal wire. Joan refuses to be rescued and demands that they let her die, but Lerner, with Beth's reluctant help, manages to restrain her long enough for Dr. Edwards to amputate the arm. Later, while Beth is cleaning Joan's room, Joan tells her more about the dark secrets behind the leadership of the hospital, including Officer Gorman's treatment of female patients. Later, as Beth breaks into Lerner's office to find the key to the elevator shaft, she discovers that Joan has also already broken in and committed suicide by reopening the amputation wound. Beth uses Joan's death to her advantage by allowing the reanimated Joan to kill Officer Gorman.

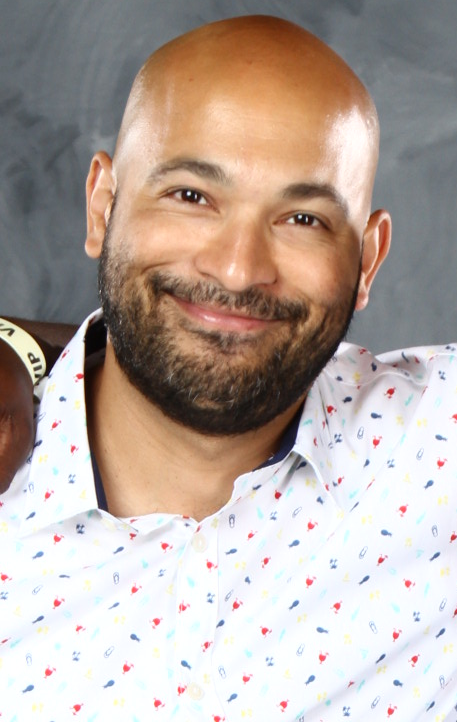
Maximiliano Hernández

- Sgt. Bob Lamson, portrayed by Maximiliano Hernández, is one of the two officers who is captured by Noah's trap, along with Officer Shepherd. He comes forward and tries to convince Rick and the group that he is the best one to talk to Officer Lerner when they make the hostage exchange, saying he has known her for eight years. Later, as they prepare to leave for the exchange, he reveals that his name is Bob, noticeably startling Sasha, who was left to watch him. While alone with her, he explains how he is alive because another officer was sent out to respond to a call that he should have taken, and that officer is now a walker in the parking lot. Sasha offers to put the walker down for him in order to alleviate his guilt, but just as she prepares to take the shot, Lamson knocks her unconscious and flees the building. However, he does not get far before Rick runs him down in a police car and shoots him in the head.
- Officer Dawn Lerner, portrayed by Christine Woods, is the strict leader of the hospital, enforcing the rules with her group of fellow officers (who are the only occupants of the hospital to possess weapons). She believes that everyone must contribute to "the greater good" and keep the hospital operation running long enough for the military to come save them, and often uses this mentality as a form of guilt in order to persuade those that they capture into doing work for the hospital once they recover. Though she is aware of Gorman's treatment of female patients, she does little to stop it. Lerner also treats the patients cruelly herself, repeatedly taking out her anger on Beth by striking her for the slightest mistakes or misunderstandings. Despite Beth's attempts to convince her that help will never come, Lerner refuses to believe it and insists that things will get better eventually, and it is far better to live under her rule than in the wilderness outside. Though she is furious at Beth for (as Lerner believes) killing Gorman and Joan as well as aiding Noah in his escape, she still refuses to kill or exile Beth, as she needs the extra help around the hospital. Though she tries to develop a bond with Beth, Beth is ultimately convinced that Lerner will never change, and her vision of a better future clouds her reasonable judgment. In the prisoner exchange at the end of "Coda", when Beth stabs Lerner in the shoulder with a pair of scissors, Lerner reacts impulsively in a moment of shock and her gun discharges, firing a single bullet directly through Beth's head and killing her instantly. Although Lerner pleads for mercy, Daryl shoots her directly in the forehead immediately afterward.
- Officer Licari, portrayed by Christopher Matthew Cook, is one of the police officers working at the hospital under Officer Lerner. When Officers Lamson and Shepherd are tricked by Rick's group, Licari arrives in his car and saves them, providing cover when Rick's group opens fire. They drive away and seemingly escape, but the car gets stuck on several walker corpses in the street, and the three officers flee. Licari reemerges when Daryl inspects a nearby trailer, and after a brief fist fight, Rick appears and holds him at gunpoint, taking him hostage as well. Licari and Shepherd are eventually returned to the hospital, and continue to live there after Lerner's death.

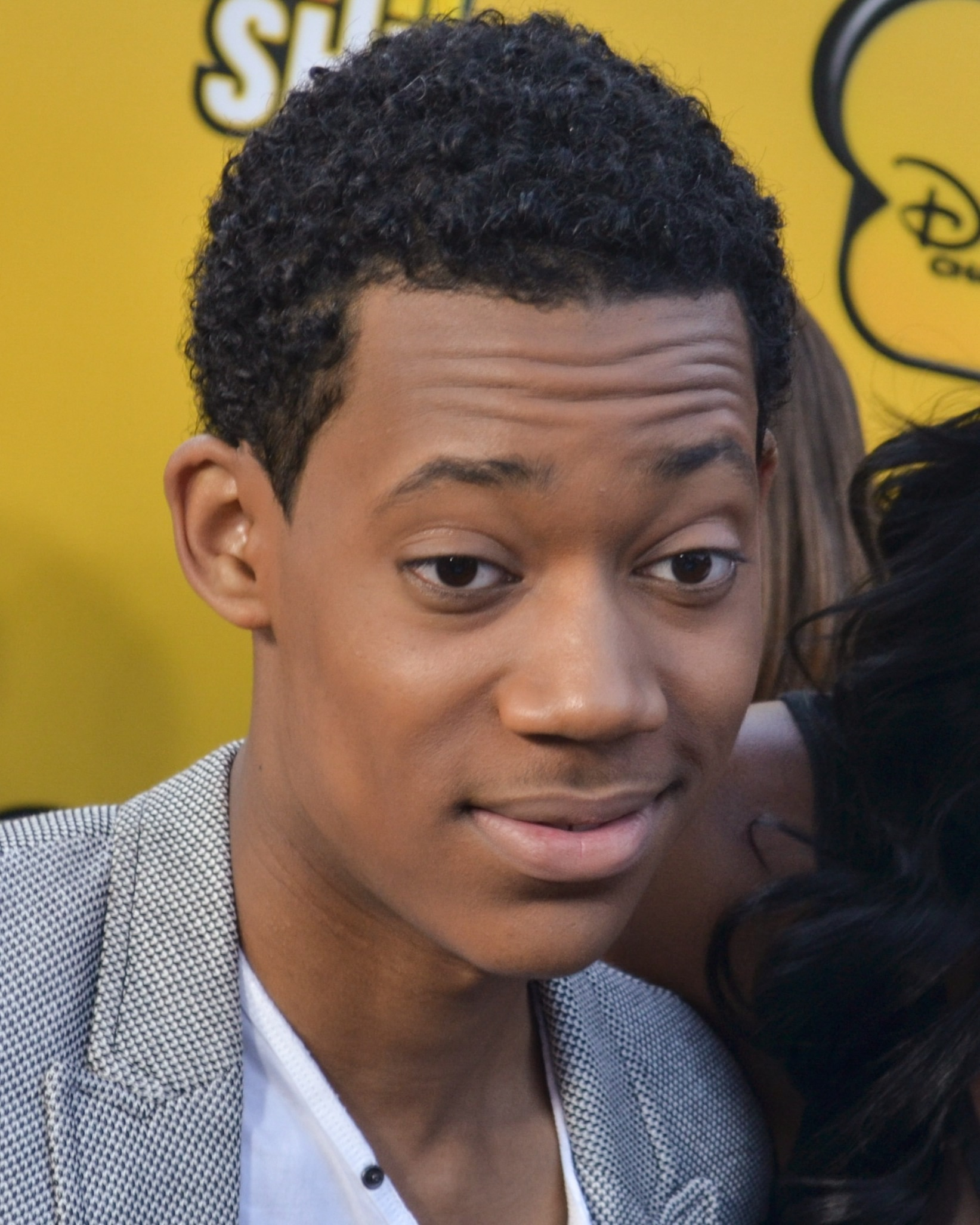
Tyler James Williams

- Noah, portrayed by Tyler James Williams, is a young male patient at the hospital who often works as a janitor. He tells Beth that both he and his father were discovered by the group while the two of them were being surround by walkers, and their rescuers said that they could only save one of them. For this reason alone, Noah displays strong distaste for the officers almost immediately, saying that with their weapons and manpower, they likely could have saved his father as well. When Beth accidentally kills Dr. Gavin Trevitt by giving him the wrong medication, Noah takes the blame by saying that while he was cleaning, he knocked over a ventilation system and caused Trevitt to flatline. For this, Officers Dawn Lerner and Gorman take him out into the hall and beat him. Beth later apologizes, only for Noah to insist that he is fine and has been through worse. Nevertheless, Beth decides to form a plan for her and Noah to escape. They use the elevator shaft, which has served as a body disposal chute, and with a long cord of sheets tied together, they both make it down, although Noah loses his grip and falls, spraining one ankle. They both manage to make it outside, where Beth fends off several walkers with a handgun. Although Beth is stopped and restrained by the officers, Noah manages to make it to the outer gate and slips through, running off after he and Beth exchange a final glance. Noah later encounters Daryl and Carol and learns of their connection to Beth, but Carol is caught and Daryl takes Noah back to the church to take the rest of the group back to Atlanta to get Beth and Carol back. However, Beth is killed by Dawn and Rick allows Noah to stay with the group. In "Spend", Noah is brutally killed by walkers during a botched mission to scavenge parts to repair the Alexandria Safe-Zone solar power system; a horrified Glenn watches but can do nothing as he watches Noah get devoured.
- Officer O'Donnell, portrayed by Ricky Wayne, is an officer working at the hospital under Officer Lerner. He is the one whom Carol and Daryl follow in "Consumed", though they eventually lose his trail when their car runs out of gas. Nevertheless, their tailing him eventually results in them discovering the group of survivors at the hospital, as well as the fact that they have Beth. In "Coda", he stands up to Lerner and accuses her of cracking under the pressure of leadership, claiming that she is no longer fit to run the hospital. Although she pulls her gun on him, he manages to disarm her, and they fight in the hallway before Beth pushes him into the elevator shaft to his death.
- Percy, portrayed by Marc Gowan, is an elderly patient at the hospital. When Beth needs to secretly steal the proper medications to give to Carol, she bribes Percy with a handful of strawberries, and he distracts the nearest officers by faking a breathing problem. Once Beth acquires the medicine and leaves, he suddenly says that he feels fine. In the next episode, he is seen being berated by Officer O'Donnell for apparently failing to properly fix a hole in the officer's shirt, and O'Donnell shoves him to the ground in anger.
- Officer Amanda Shepherd, portrayed by Teri Wyble, is one of the two officers who is captured by Noah's trap, along with Sgt. Lamson. After being taken hostage, she tries to convince Rick and the group that Officer Lerner cannot be negotiated with, and the hostage swap that they are planning will result in all of their deaths. She explains by saying that there has been a feeling of unrest among the other officers at the hospital, and that they desire to overthrow Lerner, and Lerner is aware of these sentiments. Shepherd and Licari are eventually returned to the hospital, and continue to live there after Lerner's death.

=== Alexandria Safe-Zone ===
The Alexandria Safe-Zone, first appearing in "The Distance", is a suburban community protected by large walls, located near Alexandria, Virginia. It is a self-powered community with solar panels to help power the homes and water system. When Rick's group is invited to join Alexandria, they find that the Alexandrians are defenseless, weak, and have sheltered themselves from the real world outside their gates without knowing the brutality that surrounds it, leading to a strife between the two groups. Due to several crises and attacks from multiple hostile groups, many of the original residents of Alexandria eventually die.

- Pete Anderson, portrayed by Corey Brill, is briefly seen smoking on his porch outside during the night Rick passes by. He mentions to him that his wife (Jessie) cut his hair and welcomes him to the Alexandria Safe-Zone. Pete is also the father of Ron and Sam. At the town meeting concerning Rick's fate after he threatened them with a gun, a drunken Pete shows up to confront Rick while wielding a katana stolen from Michonne, accidentally slashing Reg's throat when he attempts to push him away to avoid another conflict. A mourning Deanna gives Rick the go-ahead to execute Pete, whom he shoots while Abraham has him pinned to the ground.

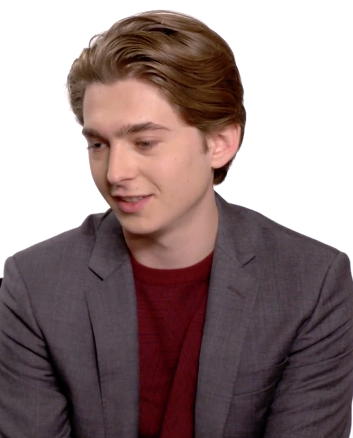
Austin Abrams

- Ron Anderson, portrayed by Austin Abrams, introduces Carl to Mikey and Enid, who are playing video games and explains that he can play with them. He is the brother to Sam and son of Jessie and Pete. He is also Enid's boyfriend. Ron develops a bitter relationship with Rick and Carl, due to Rick executing his father under Deanna's orders and Carl's budding relationship with Enid. After Jessie and Sam are killed during the walker invasion of the Alexandria Safe-Zone, Ron tries to shoot Rick only to be killed by Michonne. However, his gun goes off as he falls, shooting off Carl's right eye.
- Sam Anderson, portrayed by Major Dodson, is very briefly seen playing with his mother (Jessie) and brother (Ron) at a distance while Rick is worrying about Carl and Judith. Sam catches Carol stealing weapons from the pantry and she threatens him to keep it a secret. Despite the threat and Carol's continuing harsh words to keep him at arm's length, Sam forms an attachment to Carol, even doing favors for her, but also asks for a gun leading Carol to learn of his father's abusive relationship with his mother. When Rick and Pete fight in the streets, Sam runs to Carol for protection rather than Jessie, and subsequently Jessie is heartbroken when she learns that Sam wanted a gun to protect her. During the walker invasion of the Alexandria Safe-Zone, he refuses to leave his mother's side, but is traumatized to see a young boy as a walker. While stunned, Sam is devoured by walkers.

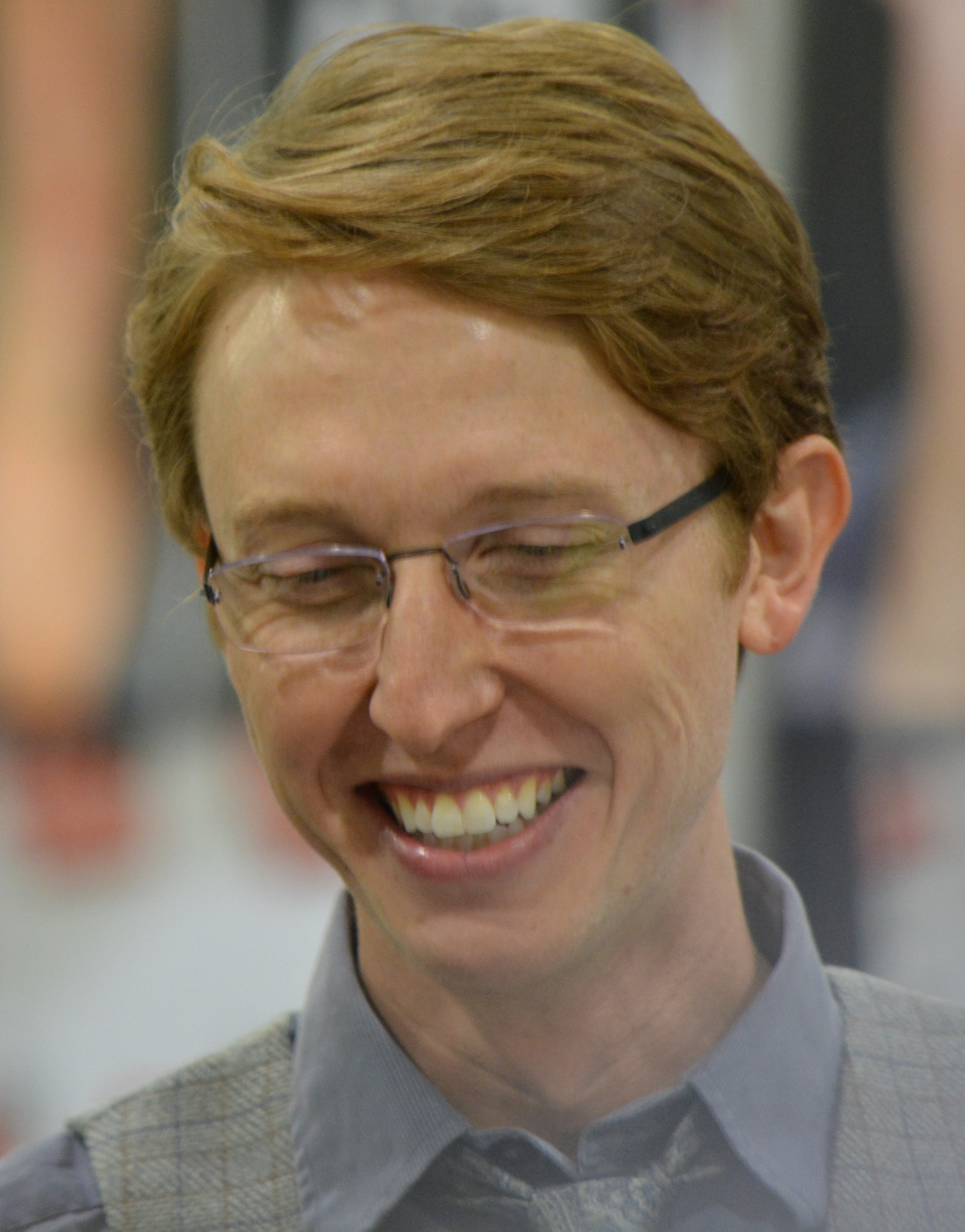
Jordan Woods-Robinson

- Eric Raleigh, portrayed by Jordan Woods-Robinson, is Aaron's boyfriend and recruiter for the Alexandria Safe-Zone. He works as his back-up. During the war against the Saviors, he bleeds to death following a bullet wound from a Savior during an assault on one of their outposts. Eric reanimates and is last seen heading to join a nearby herd of walkers to Aaron's grief.
- Mikey, portrayed by Elijah Marcano, is seen playing video games with Ron and Enid, and offers Carl to join. He is not seen after season 5.
- Aiden Monroe, portrayed by Daniel Bonjour, is the egotistical younger son of Deanna and Reg. He takes Glenn, Tara, and Noah out the safe-zone with Nicholas. Aiden almost gets Tara killed on the run and Glenn punches him afterwards. Deanna thanks Glenn for knocking Aiden "on his ass". He is later killed after being eaten by walkers following an incident which left him impaled in a warehouse.
- Reg Monroe, portrayed by Steve Coulter, is Deanna's husband and the architect who designed the walls that keep the community safe from walkers. At the town meeting concerning Rick's fate after he threatened them with a gun, a drunken Pete shows up to confront Rick while wielding Michonne's katana, accidentally slashing Reg's throat when he attempts to push him away to avoid another conflict. Deanna gets her revenge for Reg's death by giving Rick the go-ahead to execute Pete, who he shoots without any hesitation.

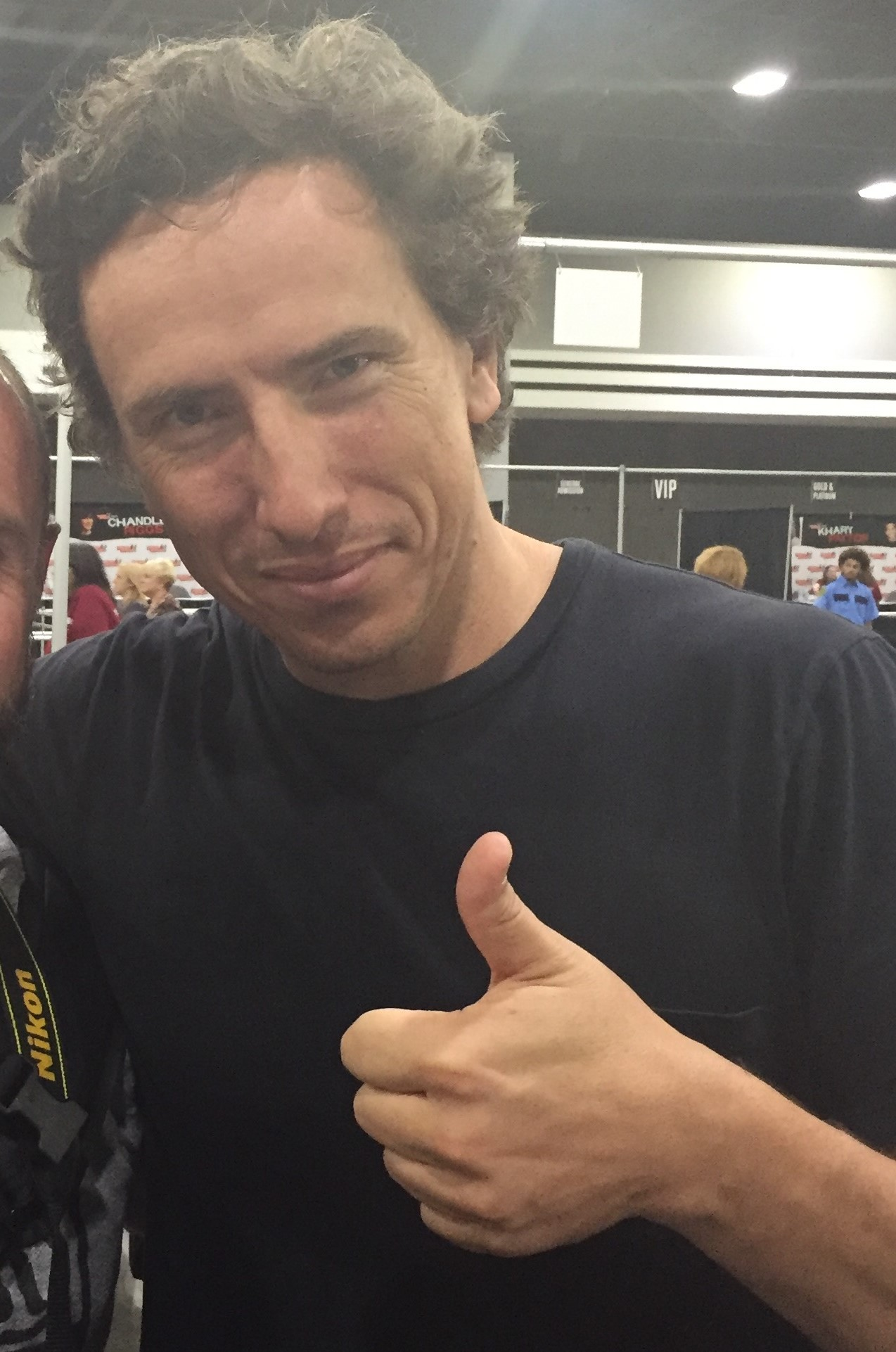
Michael Traynor

- Nicholas, portrayed by Michael Traynor, greets the group as they enter and asks them to hand over their weapons. He joins Aiden when he takes Glenn, Tara and Noah out to attack some walkers. He goes with Rick's group to lure a herd of walkers away from the Alexandria Safe-Zone, which results in his death after Nicholas commits suicide rather than be killed by the walkers. His body is then devoured by the walkers, but shields Glenn long enough for him to take cover.
- Olivia, portrayed by Ann Mahoney, is the inventory manager who takes Rick's group's weapons in a tray to keep watch over them. She often works in the pantry and armory of the Alexandria Safe-Zone. Sometime after, she is one of the first residents of Alexandria to emerge and help fight off the walker invasion, inspired by Rick taking a stand. Later, Olivia is randomly shot in the face and killed by Arat, one of Negan's Savior soldiers, to punish the Alexandrians for Rosita's attempt to shoot and kill Negan for disemboweling and killing Spencer.

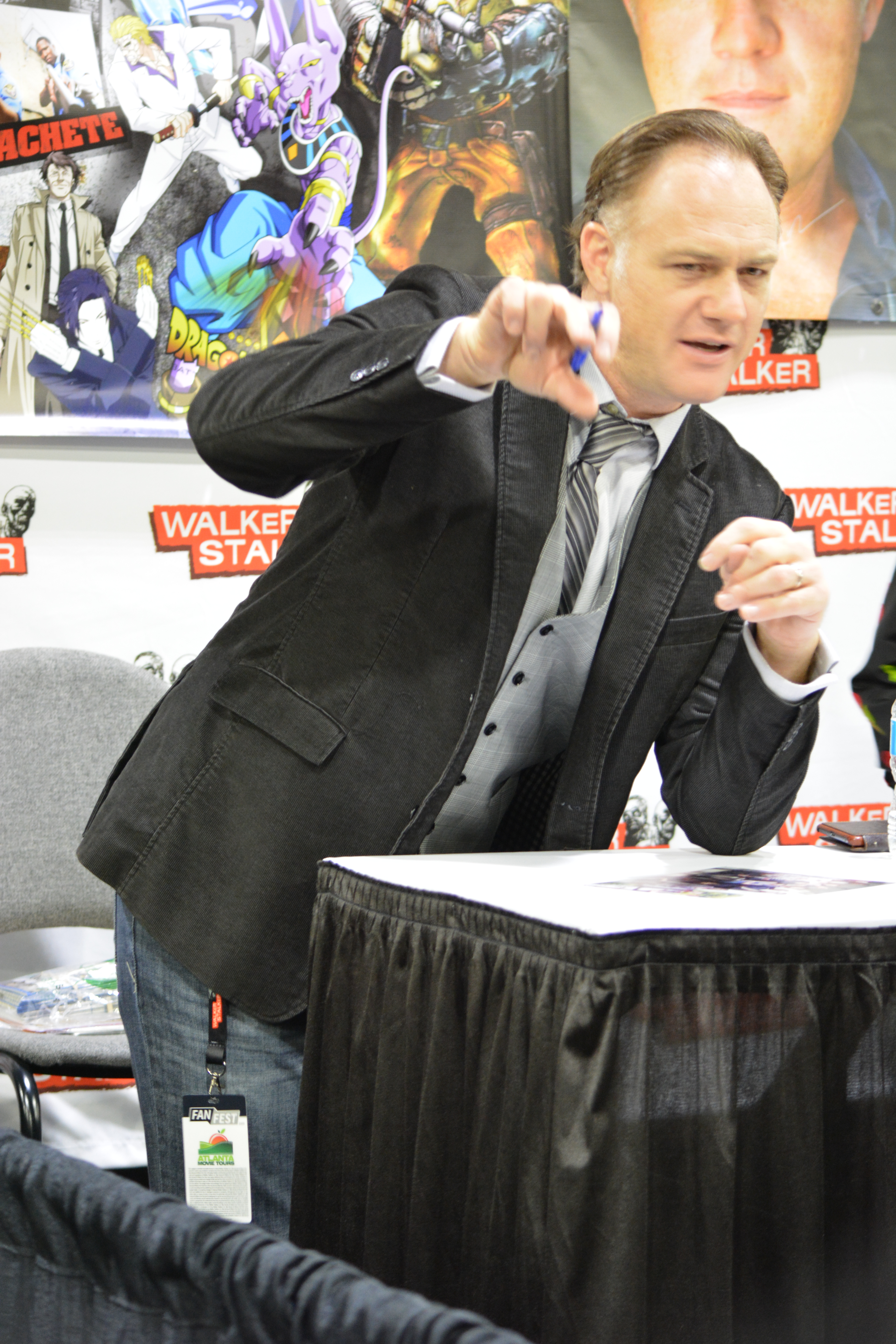
Jason Douglas

- Tobin, portrayed by Jason Douglas, is a resident of the Alexandria Safe-Zone. He works on the construction site alongside Abraham, Francine, and a few other Alexandrians. Tobin later has a brief relationship with Carol. During the Saviors attack on the Hilltop Colony led by Simon, Tobin is injured by Derek, who is then killed by Carol. Though Tobin's wound is not fatal due to Siddiq treating him on the battlefield, the Saviors had coated their weapons in walker guts. As a result, Tobin died the following night and reanimated, attacking and killing several people. After finding the zombified Tobin attacking Bertie, Carol stabbed him in the head.
- Erin, portrayed by Tiffany Morgan, is a resident of the Alexandria Safe-Zone who was killed in the Wolves attack.
- Shelly Neudermeyer, portrayed by Susie Spear Purcell, is a resident of the Alexandria Safe-Zone who desperately wanted a pasta maker. Carol confronted her about smoking in the house and was later killed in the Wolves attack.
- Sturgess, portrayed by Jonathan Kleitman, is a resident of the Alexandria Safe-Zone, when the walkers attack the group, Sturgess tries to fight them off and accidentally shoots Scott in the leg, while a walker grabs him. After being saved, Sturgess panics and runs away from the scene, abandoning the group, Shortly after having abandoned the group, he is found in a nearby town being devoured by several walkers.
- Barbara, portrayed by Mandi Christine Kerr, is a resident of the Alexandria Safe-Zone.
- Kent, portrayed by David Marshall Silverman, is a resident of the Alexandria Safe-Zone.
- Bruce, portrayed by Ted Huckabee, works on the construction site alongside Abraham, Tobin, and a few other Alexandrians. During the Savior attack on the Hilltop Colony led by Simon, Bruce suffers an arm wound from one of the Saviors' tainted weapons. Unlike most of those infected, Bruce does not die and reanimate during the night, but is left near death from the infection. After realizing what is happening to him, Bruce requests that one of the group standing nearby kill him as he cannot do it himself, a wish that is sadly granted by his friends.

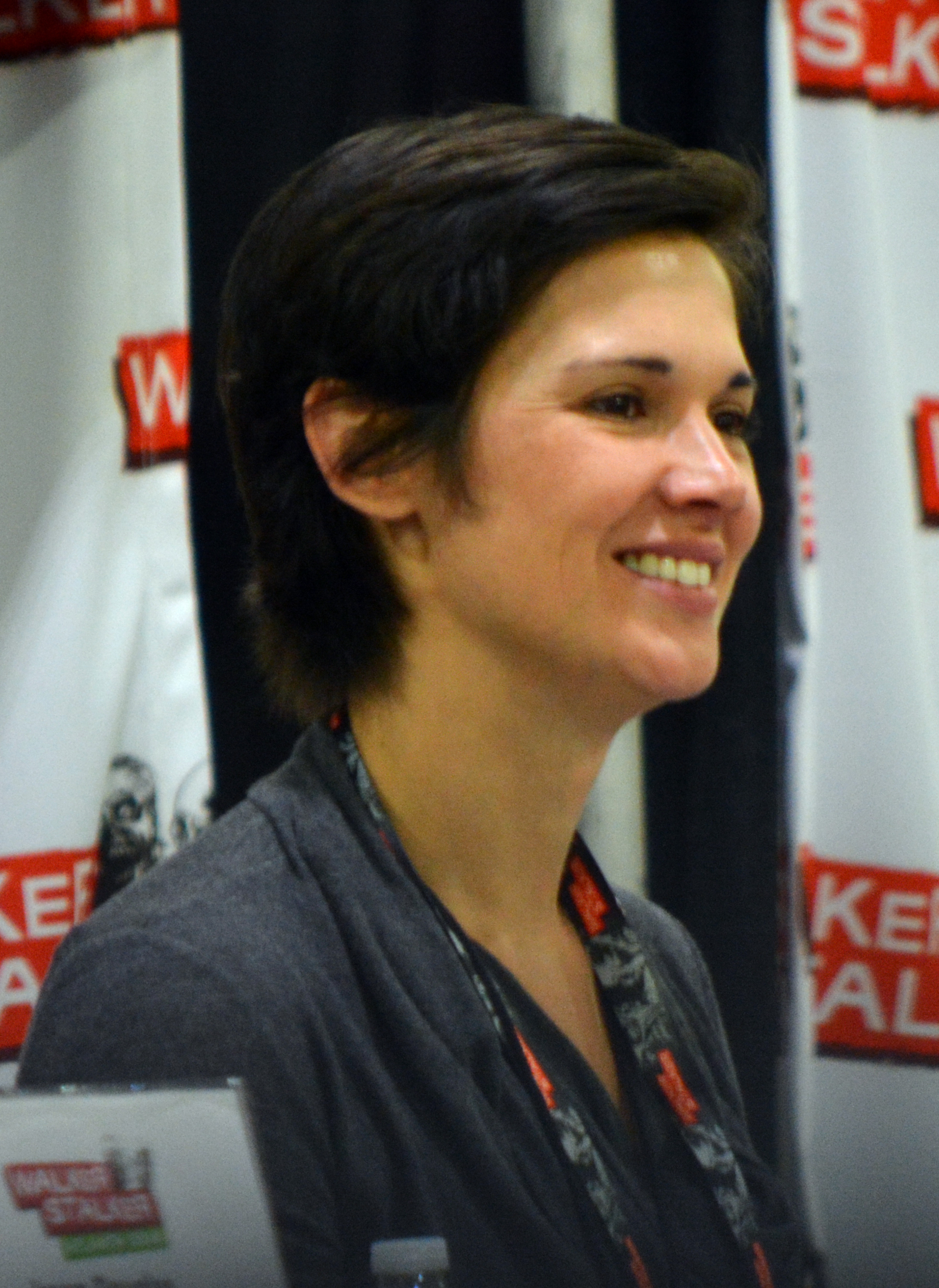
Dahlia Legault

- Francine, portrayed by Dahlia Legault, works on the construction site alongside Abraham, Tobin, and a few other Alexandrians. During the war against Negan, she is killed when she is shot in the chest by an unnamed Savior.

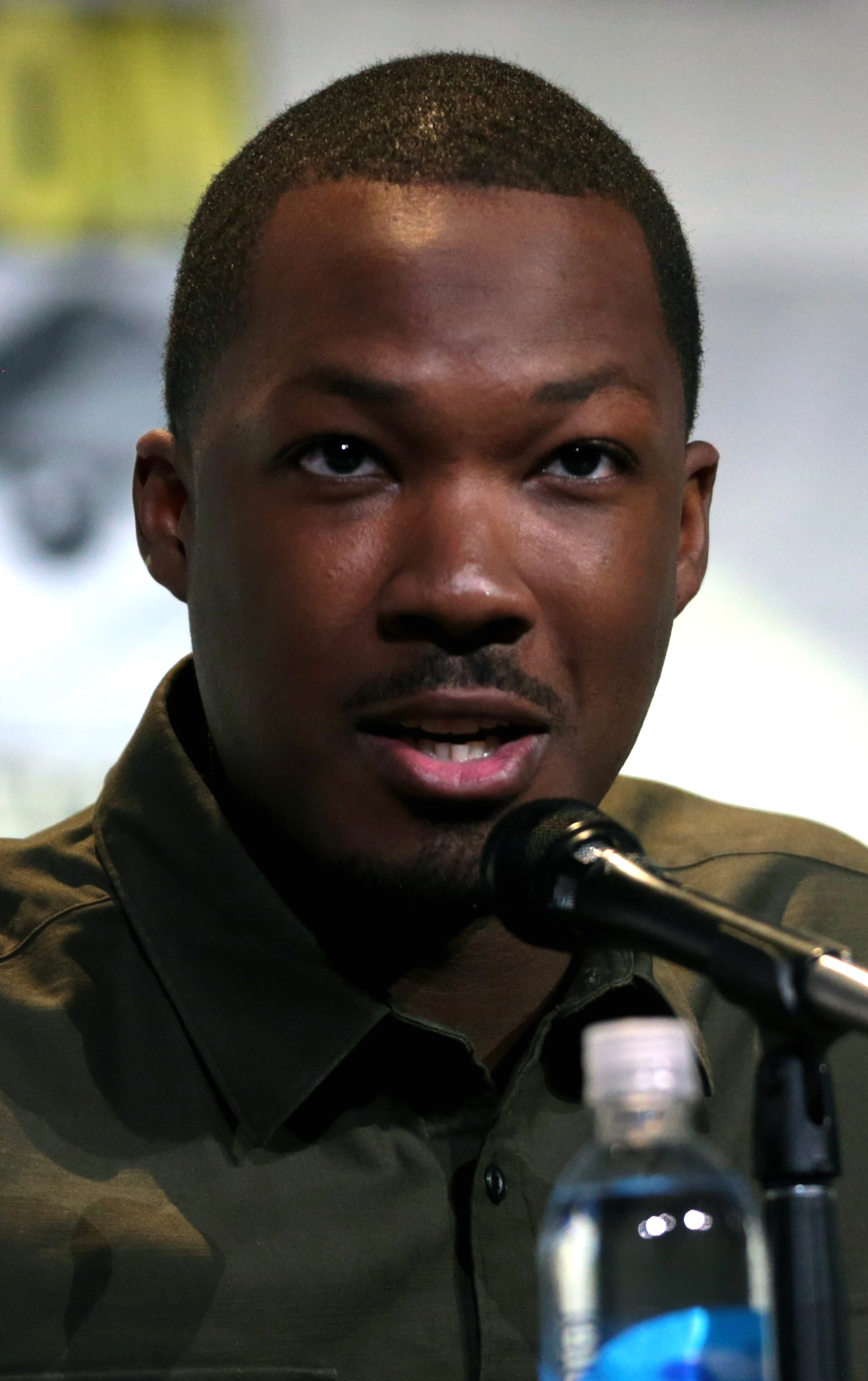
Corey Hawkins

- Heath, portrayed by Corey Hawkins, is a supply runner for the Alexandria Safe-Zone and the leader of his supply group. While on a supply mission with Tara, he disappears and has not been seen since, leaving his ultimate fate unknown.

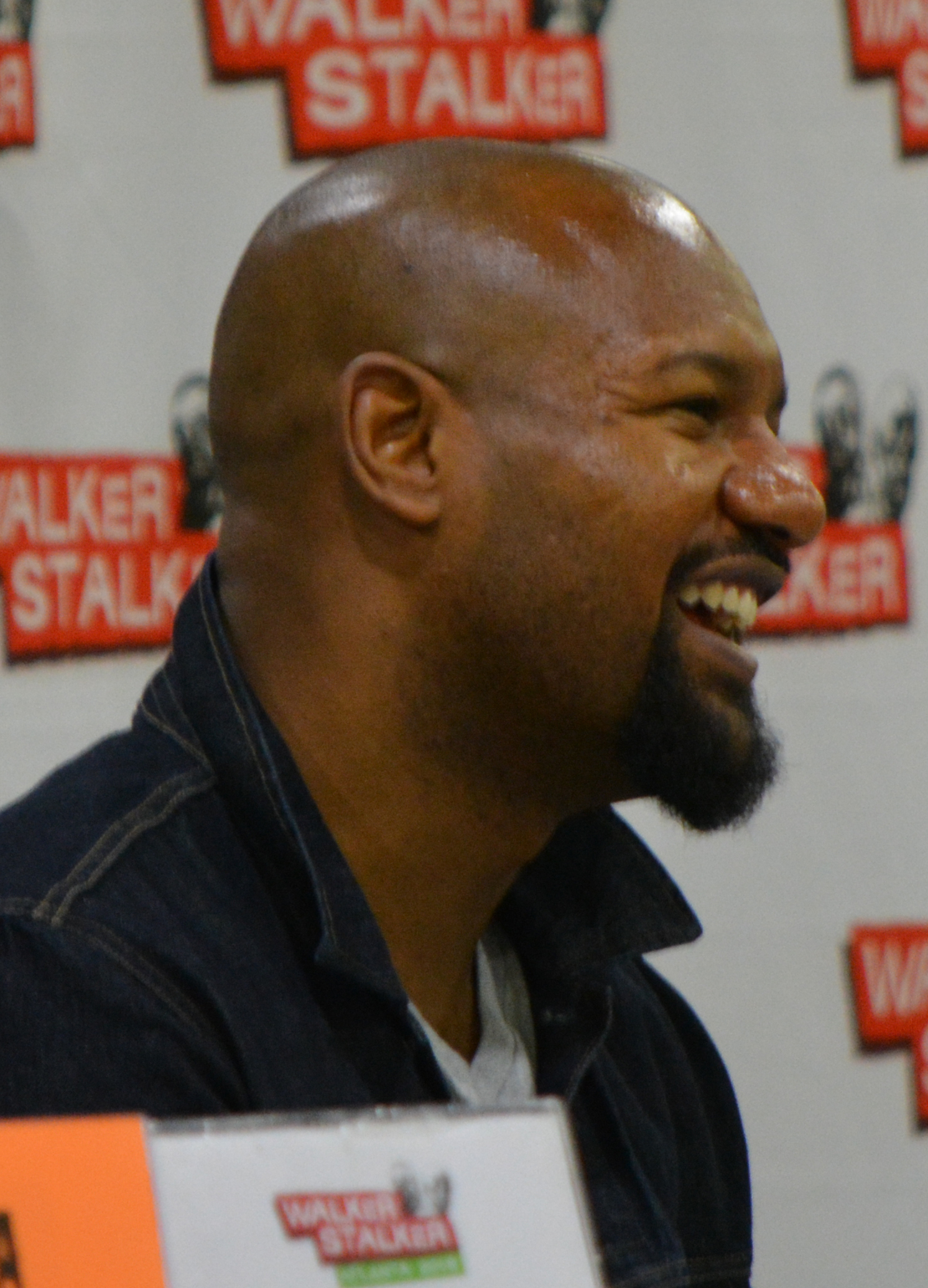
Kenric Green

- Scott, portrayed by Kenric Green, is a supply runner who is part of Heath's team.
- Annie, portrayed by Beth Keener, is a supply runner who is part of Heath's team. While on a supply run, she twists her ankle and falls, yelling to the others to keep going without her. She is then devoured and killed by walkers.
- Holly, portrayed by Laura Beamer, is a resident of the Alexandria Safe-Zone who works as a guardian and Noah's friend. She is killed in the Wolves attack.
- David, portrayed by Jay Huguley, is a supply runner and resident of the Alexandria Safe-Zone. He is with Rick's group, who are still attempting to find the source of a loud horn. He is bitten on the back by a walker, but continues to fight, saying that he wishes to return to the Alexandria Safe-Zone to say goodbye to his wife. He writes her a love letter, which he tries to persuade Michonne to give to her. Michonne refuses and gives it back, writing on her arm: "You're getting home". David is later killed while trying to escape a large herd of walkers, in front of the rest of the horrified remaining survivors. His reanimated corpse is later found by Glenn who puts him down in an act of mercy.

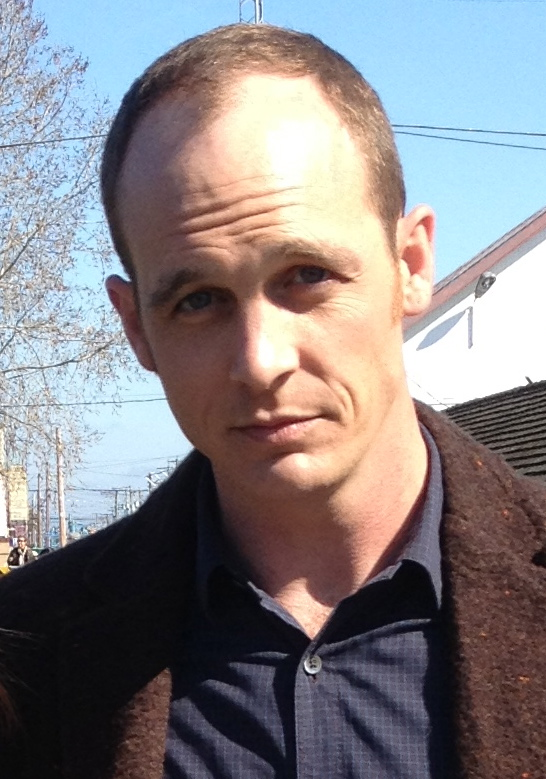
Ethan Embry

- Carter, portrayed by Ethan Embry, is a resident of the Alexandria Safe-Zone. Carter is also a part of the construction crew alongside Abraham Ford, Bruce, Francine, Tommy, and Tobin. Following a brief attempted coup against Rick, he is bitten and killed by a walker and put down by Rick out of mercy.

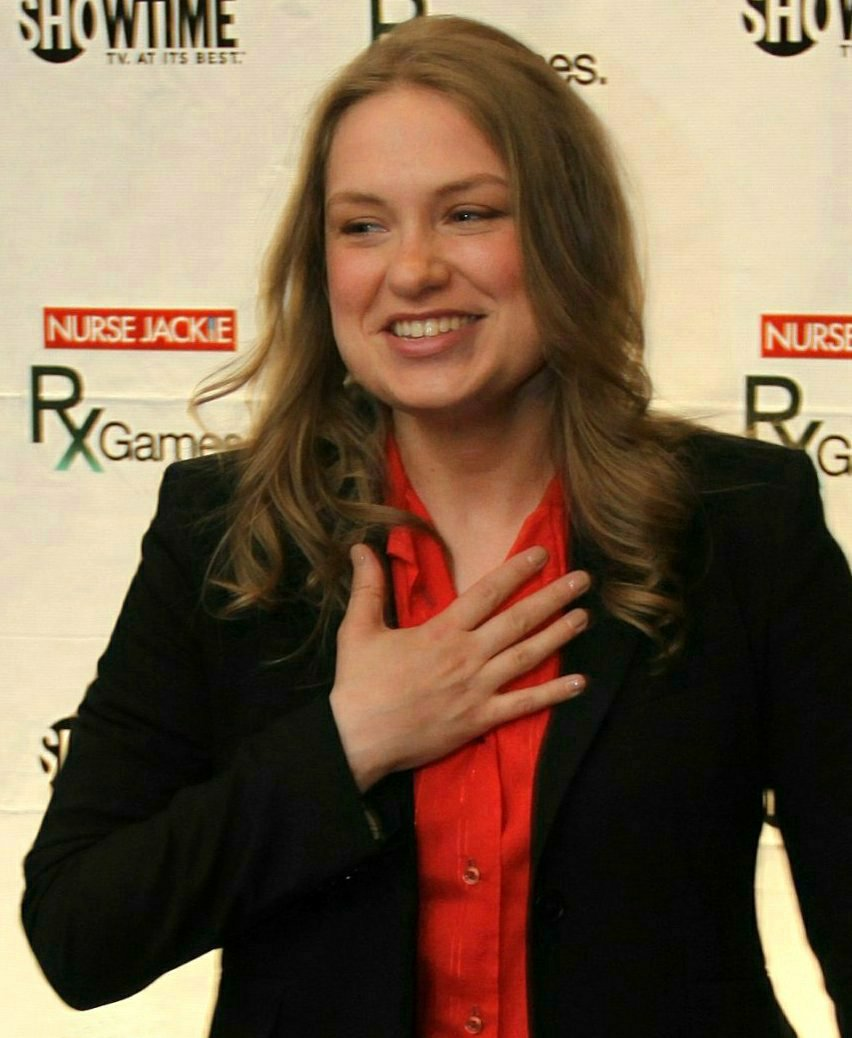
Merritt Wever

- Dr. Denise Cloyd, portrayed by Merritt Wever, is a psychiatrist and Tara's girlfriend who lost her nerve to become a surgeon in medical school. Now that Pete, the group's previous surgeon, is dead, Denise is forced to become the group's doctor and surgeon, at the urging of Eugene, who tells her "You do not want to be a coward. I know". She finally agrees to operate on a dying Holly, but cannot save her. When Scott is put into Denise's care, she tells Tara he will most likely die, but Tara tells her not to be afraid. After Tara leaves, Denise manages to stabilize Scott's infection. Shortly thereafter, she finds Tara and, much to Tara's surprise, kisses her. During the walker herd overrunning the Alexandria Safe-Zone, she is taken hostage at gunpoint by the Alpha Wolf and used so that he can escape his prison cell while Carol and Morgan are both unconscious, leaving Tara, Rosita and Eugene to watch on helplessly. The Alpha Wolf later tells her that he was not always the way he was and had changed into the person he is now. He shows signs of changing for the good, saving Denise's life from a walker attack that left him bitten. Though Denise offered to treat the man as a result, Carol shot him and he was then devoured by walkers, telling Denise to run as he did so. Returning to the infirmary, Denise finds that Carl has been shot through the eye and saves his life at the cost of his eye. When Rick and Daryl are going to leave for a run, Denise asks Daryl to get some orange soda for Tara, who is going on a two-week supply run with Heath, Daryl agrees. Later, Rick and Daryl bring an unconscious Jesus to Denise so she can check him out. After Jesus escapes, Denise notifies Abraham. Before the group head to the Hilltop Colony, Denise bakes Daryl an oak cake, which he is reluctant to take, and he hopes it tastes better than it looks. Denise is seen present at the meeting in the church, listening to Rick's speech about the danger of the Saviors. When Rick asked if anyone objected to the idea of attacking the Saviors, Denise remained silent. Later, when Denise is talking to Tara, Tara tells Denise she loves her. Tara tells Denise she does not have to reply though and Denise says she will after Tara returns from her two-week supply run with Heath. Tara suggests that Denise come along on to the Saviors compound and then she can come on the run immediately after. Denise says she wants to go, but cannot as she is the only doctor Alexandria has. Tara understands and the two kiss. Some time later, Denise convinces Daryl and Rosita to go on a scavenging run to an apothecary, which she believes is stocked up with medication and drugs. After successfully looting the place, they started for home, during which time Denise has a close encounter with a walker to get a can of soda for Tara. After Daryl and Rosita scold her for taking an unnecessary risk, Denise begins to lecture them on how she was trying to confront her fears and become strong as them. As she speaks, she gets shot by an arrow through the right eye by Dwight, killing her. Dwight later reveals she was not the one he was aiming for and shows remorse for killing her. Denise's death leads Tara to seek vengeance upon Dwight, even after he switches sides. After Dwight saves Tara's life twice, she lets go of her hatred for him and stops seeking revenge for Denise.
- Nora, portrayed by Tamara Austin, is a resident of the Alexandria Safe-Zone and Michonne's friend.
- Mrs. Robinson, portrayed by Jennifer Riker, is a resident and gardener of the Alexandria Safe-Zone. Six years after Rick's supposed death at the destruction of the bridge, she has not been seen in Alexandria, suggesting she either left the community or died due to unknown causes. Regardless, her current location and fate remain unknown.
- Cheryl, portrayed by Rebecca Koon, is a resident of the Alexandria Safe-Zone. She is asphyxiated by Dante and put down by him before reanimation.
- Brandon, portrayed by Blaine Kern III, is a resident and guardian of the Alexandria Safe-Zone. He served as the primary antagonist of the episode "What It Always Is". Brandon idolizes Negan and becomes one of his guards. However, when Negan was released from his cell, Brandon begins to follow him in the woods. While traveling together, Brandon reveals to Negan that his father was a Savior who died during the war and that his father told him that Carl was killed by Negan; however, Negan becomes angry and corrects him, saying he would never kill a kid. They later find a mother, Amelia, with her son, Milo, inside a bus. While Amelia takes Milo for a walk after sharing her story, Brandon suggests to Negan that they should rob them, to which Negan stops him and orders him to go back to Alexandria. Brandon says he cannot go back, so Negan tells him that he does not care and to just leave him alone; Brandon departs. However, believing that Negan is actually testing him, Brandon heads back to the bus site and brutally murders Amelia and Milo, who Negan bonded with and became affectionate towards, by beating them with a tire iron in order to prove his devotion while Negan gathers wood for a fire. A while later, Negan returns to the bus site and discovers the grisly scene as Brandon smiles and gloats about his kills believing to have passed the test. Before he can proudly proclaim that he is "Negan", Brandon is hit in the head by a furious Negan with a stone, knocking him out cold and allowing Negan to brutally finish Brandon off by bashing his head in several times.
- Dog is a dog of the Belgian Malinois breed and mascot of Daryl, who helps him in the hunt and tracking of the supposed corpse of Rick. After the storm, Dog goes with Daryl to live in Alexandria Safe-Zone. In real life, he is a trained dog and his name is "Seven".

=== The Wolves ===
The Wolves, first appearing in "Conquer", is a group of deranged people who destroy camps and shelters, killing everyone. They are marked with a "W" with blood on their foreheads—the sign of a wolf. They steal the belongings of their victims, often dismembering their bodies, and cutting the "W" sign onto these victims' foreheads with knives. They usually leave their victims to become walkers.

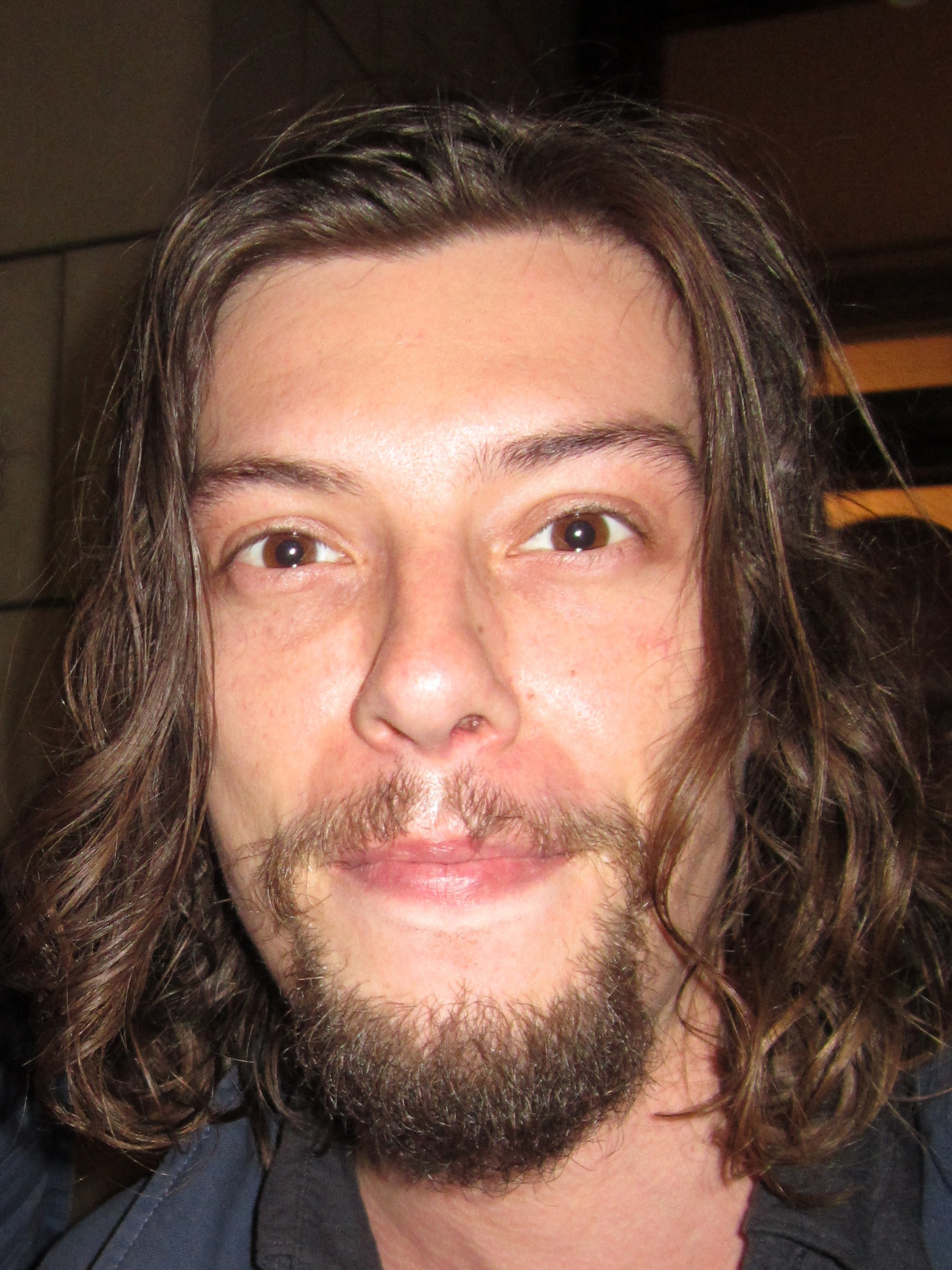
Benedict Samuel

- Owen (also known as "Alpha Wolf" or "W Man"), portrayed by Benedict Samuel, is the leader of The Wolves. He is shown to be a cunning, dangerous, greedy, and violent person. For example, he wanted "every last drop" of Morgan's drink and all of his supplies. Owen also appears to be a remorseless, cold-blooded murderer, slitting a man's throat with no hesitation or emotion. He hides in a home and attacks Morgan in an attempt to kill him when he enters, only to be knocked unconscious and held as a prisoner at the Alexandria Safe-Zone unbeknownst to the other Alexandrians as Morgan wants to change him for the better the way Eastman did for him. Owen later threatens that if he does not die from the deep gash on his side, he will kill Morgan and everyone there. During the walkers overrunning Alexandria, Carol and Morgan feud over what to do with him and get into a physical altercation, with him knocking Morgan unconscious shortly after Morgan knocks Carol out with a slam to the ground. He takes Denise as a hostage to escape at gunpoint as Rosita, Tara, and Eugene watch helplessly. He later admits to Denise that he was not always the man he is and had become what he was over time. He saves Denise's life during the walker attack on Alexandria, but is bitten. Denise says that if he watches her back, she'll get him to the infirmary to amputate his arm and save his life. On the way there, Carol sees him with Denise and shoots him. He tackles a walker and yells for Denise to run as he goes down. During the final battle, the zombified Wolf is encountered by Morgan, who puts him down for good with his staff.
- Edward, portrayed by Jesse C. Boyd, first appears when the leader of his gang gives him a signal to kill Morgan from behind using his blade. He misses Morgan and gets knocked out after the two brawl. He is later put inside of a car. This man and his group attack the Alexandria Safe-Zone. During the attack, he recognizes Morgan and he and four of his companions surround him and attempt to kill him. Morgan manages to fend them off with his quarterstaff and tells them that there are guns in the safe-zone and that they will all be killed if they stay. Morgan also tells them if they choose to continue living this life, they will die. He then tell the Wolves to leave and never come back. This wolf says that he and his group did not choose this life, and he and his companions flee the safe-zone. Before leaving, he steals a gun from a slain survivor. He is later killed along with the remaining four Wolves by Rick when they ambush him while he is parked roadside in an RV.
- Aphid, portrayed by Duke Jackson, is among the Wolves who invade the Alexandria Safe-Zone. He is killed by Carol, who steals his clothing and writes a "W" on her head in blood to use as a disguise.

=== Hilltop Colony ===
The Hilltop Colony, first appearing in "Knots Untie", is a group of survivors that have fortified the area around a large mansion atop a hill near the Alexandria Safe-Zone.

- Dr. Harlan Carson, portrayed by R. Keith Harris, is a doctor at the Hilltop Colony. He was saved by Glenn from walkers, and did an ultrasound for Maggie's baby and provided her with prenatal vitamins. He is taken by Simon to replace Dr. Emmett Carson, his brother, who Negan killed after Dwight framed him. He is later killed by a Savior after he escaped with a captive Gabriel.
- Ethan, portrayed by Justin Kucsulain, stabs Gregory to save his brother from Negan. When Rick tried to stop him, he attacked Rick and Rick ended up killing him.
- Andy, portrayed by Jeremy Palko, is a member of the Hilltop Colony. He was killed in an attack on an outpost of the Saviors.
- Craig, portrayed by Myke Holmes, is a member of the Hilltop Colony.
- Crystal, portrayed by Kimberly Leemans, is a member of the Hilltop Colony.
- Bertie, portrayed by Karen Ceesay, is a member of the Hilltop Colony.
- Kal, portrayed by James Chen, is a guard of the Hilltop Colony.
- Eduardo, portrayed by Peter Zimmerman, is a guard of the Hilltop Colony.
- Wesley, portrayed by Ilan Srulovicz, is a supply runner for the Hilltop Colony. He is killed by a Savior with a tainted weapon and succumbed to walker infection. Shortly after, he revives as a walker; Daryl ends his zombification.
- Freddie, portrayed by Brett Gentile, is a supply runner for the Hilltop Colony. He is killed by being shot multiple times on an outpost of the Saviors.

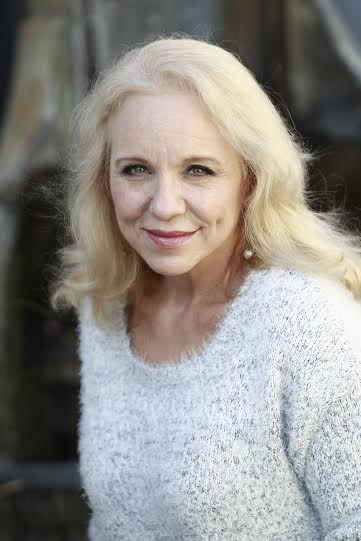
Brett Butler

- Tammy Rose Sutton, portrayed by Brett Butler, is a resident of the Hilltop Colony and wife to Earl who blames Maggie for the death of her son Ken. She and Earl later adopt an abandoned Whisperer baby. In "The Calm Before", Tammy Rose is decapitated by Alpha and her head stuck on a spike. During Siddiq's story of everyone's heroic last stand, Tammy Rose is seen protecting Rodney from attacking Whisperers.
- Earl Sutton, portrayed by John Finn, is a blacksmith of Hilltop Colony and husband to Tammy, who tried to kill Maggie after being manipulated by Gregory in retaliation for the death of his son Ken. However, Maggie forgives him in exchange for revealing that he organized his attempted crime with Gregory and after learning of Earl's alcoholic past, something that resonates with her as Maggie's father was an alcoholic. Earl and his wife subsequently adopt the abandoned Whisperer baby, naming his Adam. However, Tammy Rose is killed by Alpha during the fair massacre. During The Whisperer attack on Hilltop, he is bitten while taking the children to safety. Earl then decides to commit suicide with a railroad spike, but fails at impaling himself. After Earl reanimates, Judith is forced to put him down.
- Oscar, portrayed by Anthony Lopez, is a resident and explorer of the Hilltop Colony.
- Marco, portrayed by Gustavo Gomez, is a supply runner of the Hilltop Colony.
- Kenneth "Ken" Sutton, portrayed by AJ Achinger, is a resident of the Hilltop Colony and the son of Earl and Tammy. While on a supply mission to Washington, D.C., he is bitten by a walker and kicked in the chest by a horse he is trying to help. Despite the efforts of Siddiq and Enid, he quickly dies and a tearful Maggie stabs him in the head to prevent reanimation.
- Adeline, portrayed by Kelley Mack, is a teenage resident of the Hilltop Colony, and friends with Gage and Rodney. When Henry arrives from the Kingdom, she befriends him and develops a crush on him. When Henry escapes with Lydia, Adeline helps Daryl find him. She later helps transport supplies to the Kingdom for the trade fair and fights off several walkers. In "The Calm Before", Adeline is decapitated by Alpha, and her undead head is displayed on a spike along with Henry's, Rodney's, and several others'. In a flashback during Siddiq's story of the group's heroic last stand, Adeline fights a Whisperer together with Frankie.
- Gage, portrayed by Jackson Pace, is a teenage resident of the Hilltop Colony, and friends with Adeline and Rodney. When Henry arrives from the Kingdom, he befriends him but becomes disgusted when Henry interrupts their "fun" by killing a walker they had imprisoned. She later helps transport supplies to the Kingdom for the trade fair and fights off several walkers. In "The Calm Before", Gage and Rodney tell Lydia that Henry and Adeline have mutual crushes on each other, disgusting Henry when he finds out. At the fair, Gage looks for his friends, unaware that they have been murdered by Alpha. He later moves to the Alexandria Safe-Zone and becomes a soldier in the Coalition, but teams up with Margo and Alfred to attack Lydia in revenge for the death of his friends which backfires when Negan protects Lydia and accidentally kills Margo in the process.
- Rodney, portrayed by Joe Ando-Hirsh, is a teenage resident of the Hilltop Colony, and friends with Adeline and Gage. When Henry arrives from the Kingdom, he befriends him but becomes disgusted when Henry kills a walker and interrupts their "fun". He later helps transport supplies to the Kingdom for the trade fair and fights off several walkers. In "The Calm Before", Gage and Rodney tell Lydia that Henry and Adeline have mutual crushes on each other, disgusting Henry when he finds out. Later, Rodney is decapitated by Alpha, and his undead head is displayed on a spike along with Henry's, Adeline's, and several others. In a flashback during Siddiq's story of the group's heroic last stand, a tied-up Rodney is protected from The Whisperers by Tammy Rose Sutton before they lose the fight and are executed.

=== The Sanctuary ===
The Sanctuary, first appearing in "The Cell", is a community of a gargantuan group founded with the goal of restoring civilization to the world. They are ruled by their charismatic authoritarian leader Negan, who is also a merciless and totalitarian dictator. Some residents are civilians that work for the community, but in majority is conformed by strong people called "The Saviors", who have a reputation of being ruthless and uncompromising, and plunder people on the road.

They enact a brutal regime to terrorize and subjugate any and all nearby survivor communities they come across in the area surrounding Washington, D.C. through murder and brutality to coerce survivors to provide a steady stream of food and other goods. The central headquarters for the group is an abandoned factory, after Negan took the place from its apparently incapable leader. After a brief war with the Militia and Negan's eventual defeat, the Saviors and the Militia declare peace.

The community was home to close to 600 members, both soldiers and workers, as well as families and children living in the Sanctuary, though their numbers were greatly diminished during the course of the war. Six years after Rick's supposed death at the destruction of the bridge, the remaining Saviors have disbanded following the Sanctuary going "bust". Most went on to join the communities they once oppressed while a handful joined a group of rough raiders led by Jed before its destruction.

==== Civilians ====
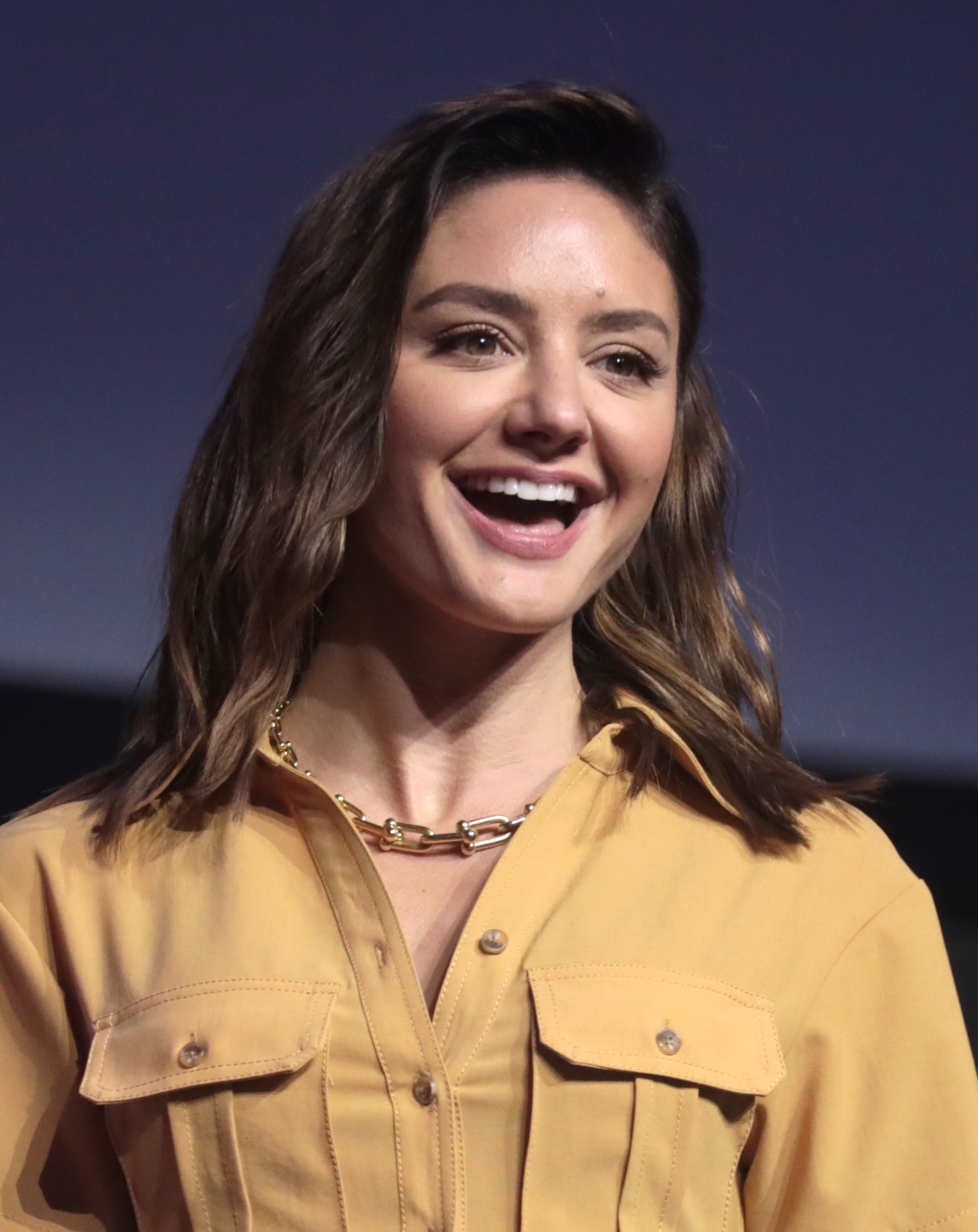
Christine Evangelista

- Sherry, portrayed by Christine Evangelista, is Dwight's wife. She is first encountered by Daryl in the burnt forest with Dwight and her sister Tina in "Always Accountable". They are on the run from the Saviors, after stealing insulin for Tina. Daryl attempts to help them, though after Tina's death, Sherry and Dwight steal Daryl's motorcycle and crossbow, and abandon him. It is later revealed that as punishment for stealing and fleeing from the Sanctuary, Dwight took an iron to the face and Sherry agreed to be one of Negan's wives in order to save Dwight's life. Sherry later encounters Daryl again at the Sanctuary after his capture and is remorseful for stealing from him previously. Offscreen, Sherry frees Daryl from the Sanctuary and also escapes herself. Negan then recruits Dwight to go and bring her back. Dwight obeys and travels to their old home where they planned to meet up if things went bad, and discovers a note from Sherry (along with her wedding rings) in which she admits to freeing Daryl and apologizes for forcing Dwight into Negan's world. Her current whereabouts are unknown, but after the war Dwight set out to find her, discovering a second note from Sherry in their old home, giving him hope.
- Tina, portrayed by Liz E. Morgan, is Sherry's diabetic sister. As Tina stands over the corpses of her two friends killed by the fire Sherry and Dwight had started, her friends suddenly attack her, ripping her throat out, painfully killing her. It is assumed that Tina was then put down by Daryl, Dwight, or Sherry before she could reanimate.
- Amber, portrayed by Autumn Dial, is Mark's ex-girlfriend and one of Negan's wives.
- Tanya, portrayed by Chloe Aktas, is one of Negan's wives.
- Frankie, portrayed by Elyse Dufour, is one of Negan's wives. Following the two timeskips, she is revealed to have moved to the Alexandria Safe-Zone and adopted a daughter. In "The Calm Before", Frankie is one of the people decapitated by Alpha and then had their head stuck on a spike. During Siddiq's story of the group's heroic last stand, she is seen fighting a Whisperer together with Addy before everyone is killed.
- Gordon, portrayed by Michael Scialabba, is an ex-member of the Saviors. He is killed by Dwight with a shot to the back to end his misery. His reanimated corpse is chained to the Sanctuary fence, but is destroyed when the fence is blown up in "Mercy", along with all of the fence walkers.
- Dr. Emmett Carson, portrayed by Tim Parati, is the doctor of the Saviors. Dwight sets Carson up by planting Sherry's letter in his office. Negan later accuses Carson of helping Daryl escape in order to impress Sherry and throws him face-first into the furnace, burning him to death instantly.

==== Saviors ====
- Bud, portrayed by Christopher Berry, is the leader of a motorcycle gang. He tells Daryl, Abraham and Sasha that their truck, weapons, and all other supplies now belong to his leader, Negan. Shortly after, he and his entire group are blown up with a rocket launcher by Daryl.

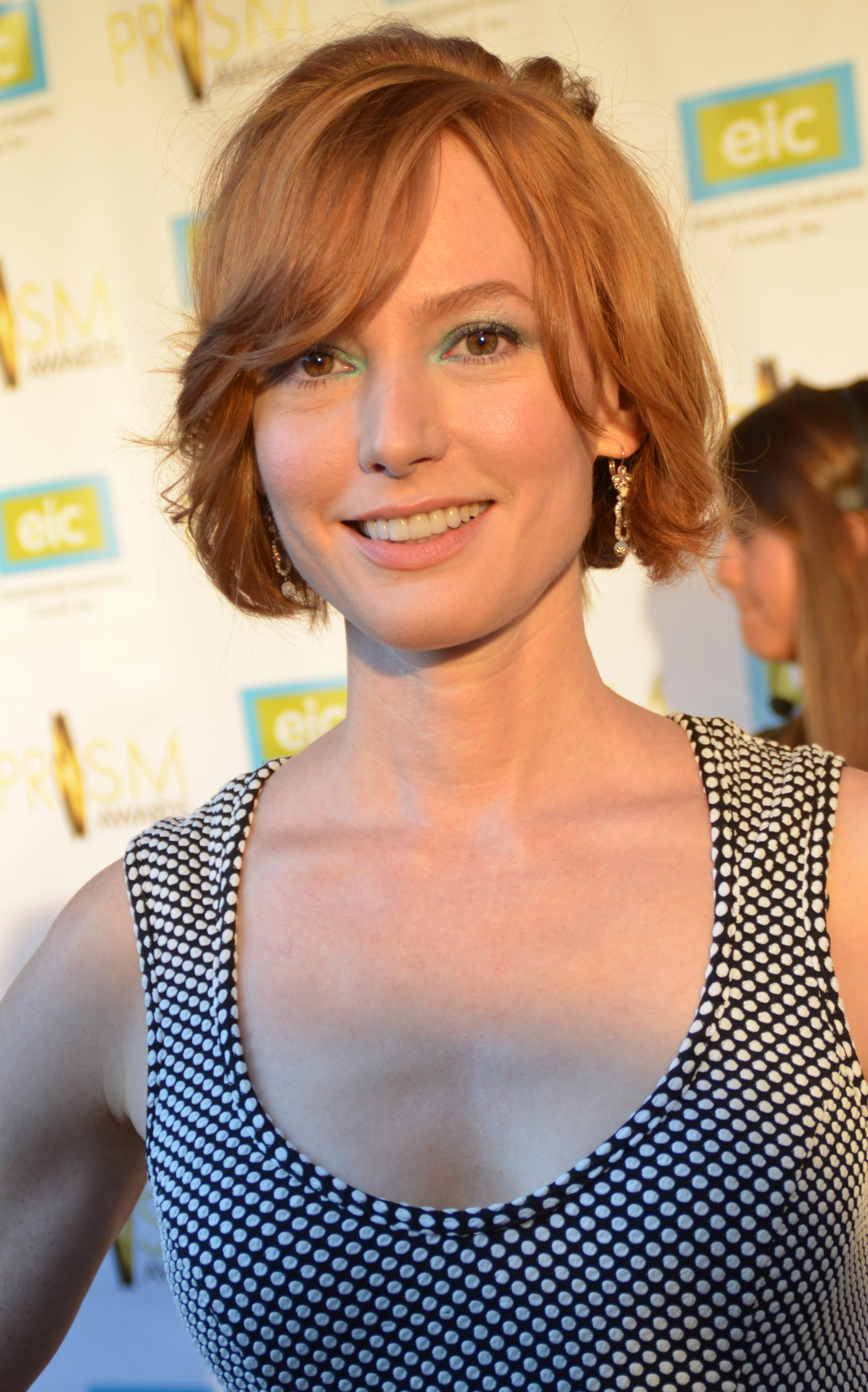
Alicia Witt

- Paula, portrayed by Alicia Witt, is first heard talking to Rick over a walkie-talkie telling him she only wants to talk. When he denies her request, she reveals she has Carol and Maggie held captive. Paula brings them back to their compound where they tie and gag them. Paula is the counterpart to Carol. When Carol and Maggie escape from the compound, Carol threatens to kill Paula, but will not despite Maggie telling her to do so. Instead she shoves her into a pole whereupon she is devoured by a walker and killed by Maggie after she turns.
- Roman, portrayed by Stuart Greer, is with the group of Saviors on the road, who stop Carol in the middle of the road, and try to subjugate her, but she opens fire, killing several, in addition mortally wounding fellow Savior Jiro and himself. When Roman is about to kill Carol, Morgan aims his gun at him, and gives him a chance to leave, but he declines. And when he is about to kill Carol, Morgan does not hesitate to shoot, killing him and saving Carol from certain death.
- Primo, portrayed by Jimmy Gonzales, is a member of Negan's group. He attempts escape with Daryl's renovated motorcycle, which had been stolen from Daryl by Dwight in "Always Accountable". He is shot in the head by Rick after he claims to be Negan.
- Donnie, portrayed by Rus Blackwell, is a member of Negan's group. Donnie ambushes Carol and Maggie, who are guarding the perimeter of the Saviors' compound. Carol shoots him in the arm, but spares his life. His arm is wrapped and is instructed not to remove it. When Maggie removes Donnie's tourniquet to let him bleed out, she realizes he is already dead. He later reanimates and infects Molly, but she stabs him in the head.
- Molly, portrayed by Jill Jane Clements, is an older Savior. She is a chain smoker and has a bad cough which she implies is a terminal illness. When Molly enters the room Carol was held in to check up on her, she is surprised and bitten in the arm by a zombified Donnie, who reanimated after bleeding to death. Maggie then attacks Molly from behind, takes her gun and uses it to bash in Molly's head.
- Jiro, portrayed by Rich Ceraulo, is a member of the Saviors. He speaks for a pick-up truck of Saviors and tries to capture Carol, who begins to fire on them. Carol kills most of them, but Jiro dodges the rain of gunfire. He is discovered by Carol and is shot, and later stabbed in the head by Rick.
- Michelle, portrayed by Jeananne Goossen, is member of the Saviors who take captive Maggie and Carol. She is the counterpart to Maggie. Her boyfriend was blown up by Daryl and she stole gas to go find him, but was caught and her finger got chopped off as a punishment. She reveals she had a baby, but it died. When Michelle begins hearing gunshots coming from inside the compound, she runs out to investigate, but gets shot in the head by Carol.
- Cam, portrayed by Matt Lowe, is a member of the Saviors, he is hunting for Dwight, Honey and Tina. While in hiding, Daryl rustles some branches and distracts Cam, causing him to get bitten on the forearm by a walker pinned against the tree. Wade, the party leader, immediately uses a belt for a tourniquet and hacks off Cam's forearm without hesitation. His ultimate fate is unknown as he is never seen or mentioned again.

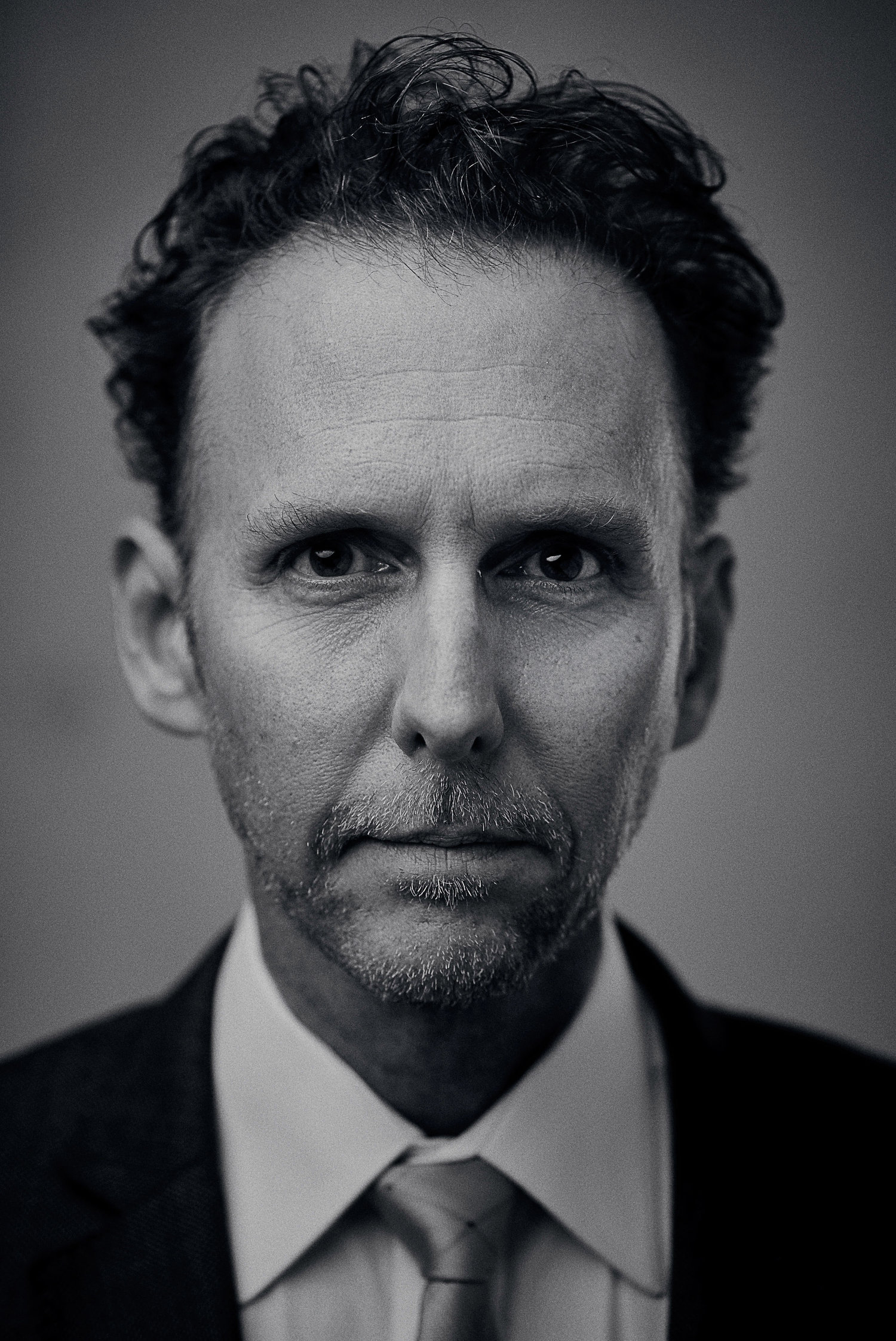
Jayson Warner Smith

- Gavin, portrayed by Jayson Warner Smith, is one of Negan's top lieutenant and the leader of a Savior outpost in charge of collecting weekly offerings from the Kingdom. Unlike most of the Saviors, Gavin does not appear to be overly malicious and is upset by Benjamin's death after he is shot by Jared, and generally employs less violent methods than his other counterparts. When Gavin and the Saviors attack the Kingdom, they take Ezekiel captive, but Morgan and Carol rescue him by trapping Gavin and killing several of his men. As Morgan prepares to kill Gavin, Gavin is stabbed through the throat from behind by Benjamin's vengeful younger brother, Henry, and killed. Carol then stabs him in the head to prevent reanimation. Morgan is later haunted by hallucinations of a dead Gavin.
- Jared, portrayed by Joshua Mikel, is a member of the Saviors and he works for Gavin. Jared causes the death of Benjamin when he shoots Benjamin in the leg and he bleeds out. During the early stages of the war, he is captured by Jesus and taken as a prisoner to the Hilltop Colony against the protests of Morgan. When the Saviors attack the Hilltop and the residents begin to reanimate, he takes the opportunity to escape with several other Saviors, helped by Benjamin's vengeful brother, Henry, opening the gate in search of Benjamin's killer. Later, Jared and his company take Morgan and Rick as hostages, but release them due to the threat of a herd of walkers that invaded their refuge. Rick and Morgan turn on the Saviors and kill them. Though Jared tries to run, he is trapped in a hallway full of walkers by Morgan and brutally devoured. Morgan is later haunted by hallucinations of Jared.
- Arat, portrayed by Elizabeth Ludlow, is a member of the Saviors, commissioned for confiscating supplies, weapons, and furniture of the Alexandria Safe-Zone, under Negan's orders. When the war against Negan ends, Arat surrenders and makes peace with the allied communities. Years later, Cyndie received revenge when she killed Arat, who Cyndie despises, by driving a spear in the back of her head for sadistically murdering her little brother when Simon led an attack on their community.
- Joseph "Fat Joey", portrayed by Joshua Hoover, is a member of the Saviors. He is ordered to watch Daryl by Negan, but is later brutally bludgeoned to death when Daryl escapes his cell at the Sanctuary. Daryl recovers Rick's gun from Joey who had it on him when he died.
- David, portrayed by Martinez, is a member of Negan's group. He is killed by Negan when attempts to rape Sasha. Having stabbed him in the neck, Negan leaves David in Sasha's cell with the choice to let David kill her when he reanimates or to kill David and join the Saviors. After David reanimates, Sasha kills him again with Negan's knife.
- Gary, portrayed by Mike Seal, is a Savior who raids the Alexandria Safe-Zone for supplies, weapons, and furniture. As Negan and Rick walk around, Gary approaches Negan with the video camera that Deanna used to interview Rick and the other new arrivals. He is killed by Arat and D.J. when he was helping Simon in his mutiny against Negan. Negan then bashes his head in with his bat Lucille to prevent Gary from reanimating.
- Mark, portrayed by Griffin Freeman, is a member of the Saviors and Amber's ex-boyfriend. When he tried to escape with Amber, Negan punishes him by burning his face. Mark was originally intended to be killed by Dwight in "Time for After", but after Griffin Freeman's stuntman died shooting the scene, it was not shown.
- Laura, portrayed by Lindsley Register, is a high-ranking member of the Saviors. She was the first to learn of Dwight's duplicity during the assault on the Alexandria Safe-Zone, but is forced to run and disappears. Laura's disappearance protects Dwight's cover amongst the Saviors for a while, but she is eventually found along the side of the road by Negan and exposes Dwight, and then acts as Negan's driver to the ambush point. During the final battle with the Militia, Laura leads the surviving Saviors in surrendering to Rick's army and accepts peace with the other communities following Negan's defeat. Six years after Rick's supposed death at the destruction of the bridge, she has joined Alexandria and is a member of its council. In "Stalker", in an attempt to protect Gamma as she runs to the streets for help, Laura attacks Beta by jumping on his back. However, Beta manages to overpower her, picks her up, and swings her around so her head bounces off each prison cell bar before slamming her to the ground, breaking her neck and killing her. Laura reappears in flashbacks in "Here's Negan" where its revealed that Negan first encountered Laura months after the apocalypse began when he sought out a doctor for more chemotherapy drugs for his cancer-stricken wife Lucille. The doctor was Laura's father Franklin and Laura subsequently gave her baseball bat to Negan after learning that he was unarmed; Laura's baseball bat would become Negan's signature weapon Lucille after he wrapped it in barbed wire. After Franklin and Laura were captured by a biker gang, Negan rescued them and killed all of the bikers.
- Isabelle, portrayed by Aerli Austen, is a member of Negan's group, when she was driving a pick-up truck by herself she notices a line of walker corpses in the road. As she gets out to investigate, she is captured by Michonne. She is later shot in the head by Michonne after leading Michonne to the Sanctuary.
- Roy, portrayed by Brian Stapf, is a member of the Saviors. He is bitten in the face by the zombified Sasha, killing him.

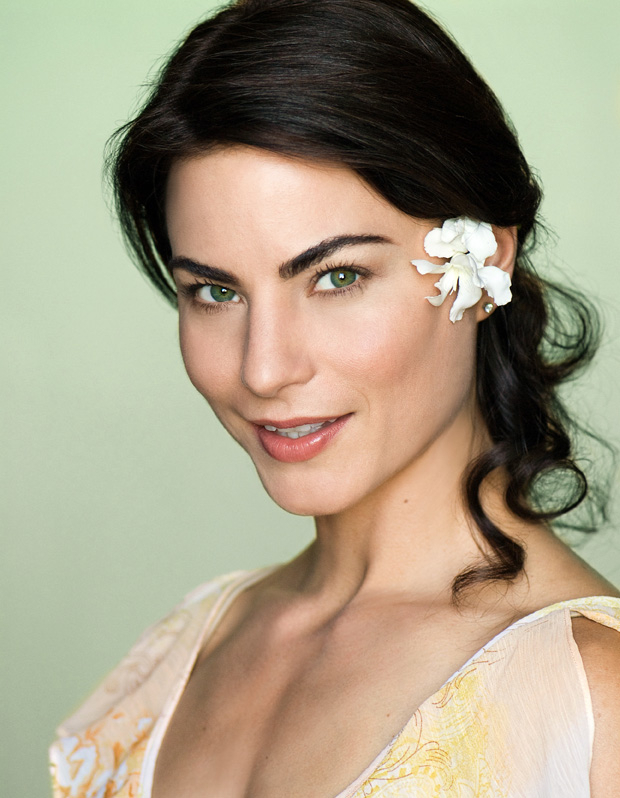
Traci Dinwiddie

- Regina, portrayed by Traci Dinwiddie, is a female member of the Saviors and a high-ranking lieutenant who leads one of the Saviors major outposts. After the war she walks with a cane due to a leg injury from Eugene during the final battle. Years after Rick's apparent death at the destruction of the bridge, she is part of a group of former Saviors that have turned into raiders led by Jed. Following a confrontation with Carol and her adopted son, Henry, Carol burns the former Saviors alive, including Regina.
- Mara, portrayed by Lindsey Garrett, is a Savior lieutenant. She is killed by the Militia when they killed several Saviors and allowed them to reanimate to use as additional troops.
- Morales, portrayed by Juan Pareja (already mentioned above as a member of the "Atlanta Survivor Camp"), is a member of the Saviors, and featured in "The Damned" and "Monsters". He surprises Rick and holds him by gunpoint inside a Savior outpost. Rick recognizes him and reminds him that he knew him from Atlanta, but Morales responds that those events were a long time ago. He informs Rick that he has called more Saviors for backup. However, he is found by Daryl, who immediately shoots him in the head with a crossbow arrow, instantly killing him.

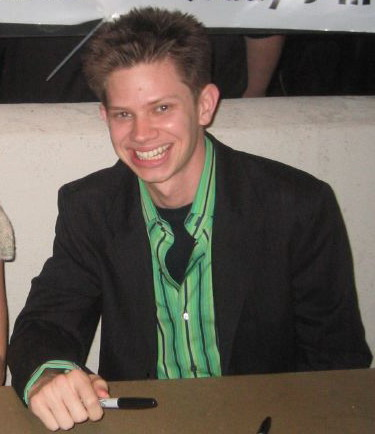
Lee Norris

- Todd, portrayed by Lee Norris, is a member of the Saviors and a worker at Regina's outpost. During the battle with the Militia, Todd survives by hiding, though he suffers a leg wound. Afterwards, he ambushes Rick and Daryl, but is convinced to surrender by Rick. After telling the two men that all of the heavy weapons have been moved to Gavin's outpost, he is shot dead by Daryl to Rick's slight shock.
- Gunther, portrayed by Whitmer Thomas, is a member of the Saviors. Appearing in "Some Guy", he kills Alvaro with a fatal gunshot through the chest and takes Ezekiel hostage. When he is about to stab Ezekiel, Jerry shows up and chops his body in half with his axe, killing him and saving his leader from certain death.
- Yago, portrayed by Charles Halford, is a member of the Saviors who manages Gavin's weapons base. During a chase, his truck is hijacked by Rick, who stabs him in the gut and throws him out of the vehicle, though not killing him. He died shortly thereafter of his wound and is stabbed in the head by Rick to prevent reanimation.
- Katy, portrayed by Katy O'Brian, is a Savior stationed at the Satellite Outpost who is captured by the Militia and held captive at the Hilltop Colony. During the attack on the Hilltop, she is non-fatally hit with a Savior arrow. However, because the arrow is tainted with walker guts, she dies and reanimates that night as Henry confronts the Saviors to find his brother's killer. Katy attacks her comrades, killing at least one and creating a distraction for the others to get away. She is later put down by Siddiq when he goes to check on the prisoners.
- D.J., portrayed by Matt Mangum, is a high-ranking Savior loyal to Negan who fights in the war with the Militia. D.J. helps Negan to put down Simon's rebellion and survives the final battle with the Militia. Eighteen months later, D.J. works on the bridge construction project, but develops an antagonistic attitude once more when Justin turns up murdered. D.J. acts as the second-in-command to Jed's rebel Saviors, though he is more practical than Jed, backing down when threatened at gunpoint by Rick when Jed would not. Despite his initial loyalty to Jed, he abandons Jed's group in the six years following Rick's "death" and instead joins the Alexandria Safe-Zone where he becomes a trusted citizen. He later escorts Michonne and Magna's group to the Hilltop Colony and aids in fighting off a massive walker herd, returning the weapons of Magna and her friends to them so they can help. In "The Calm Before", D.J. works with the Highwaymen to clear the roads around the Kingdom and is decapitated by Alpha and his head displayed on a spike. Siddiq reveals that before the execution, D.J., Ozzy and Alek arrived and gave the prisoners a chance to fight back with D.J. being shown to have killed at least one Whisperer before two more tackled him to the ground, though one was taken out by Tara to help him.
- Norris, portrayed by Aaron Farb, is D.J.'s right-hand man. He is among the Savior rebels to attack the bridge construction camp under Jed's leadership. Norris is killed in the fight and reanimates. His reanimated corpse is later found by Rick who manages to put Norris down with a shot to the head despite his own weakened state.

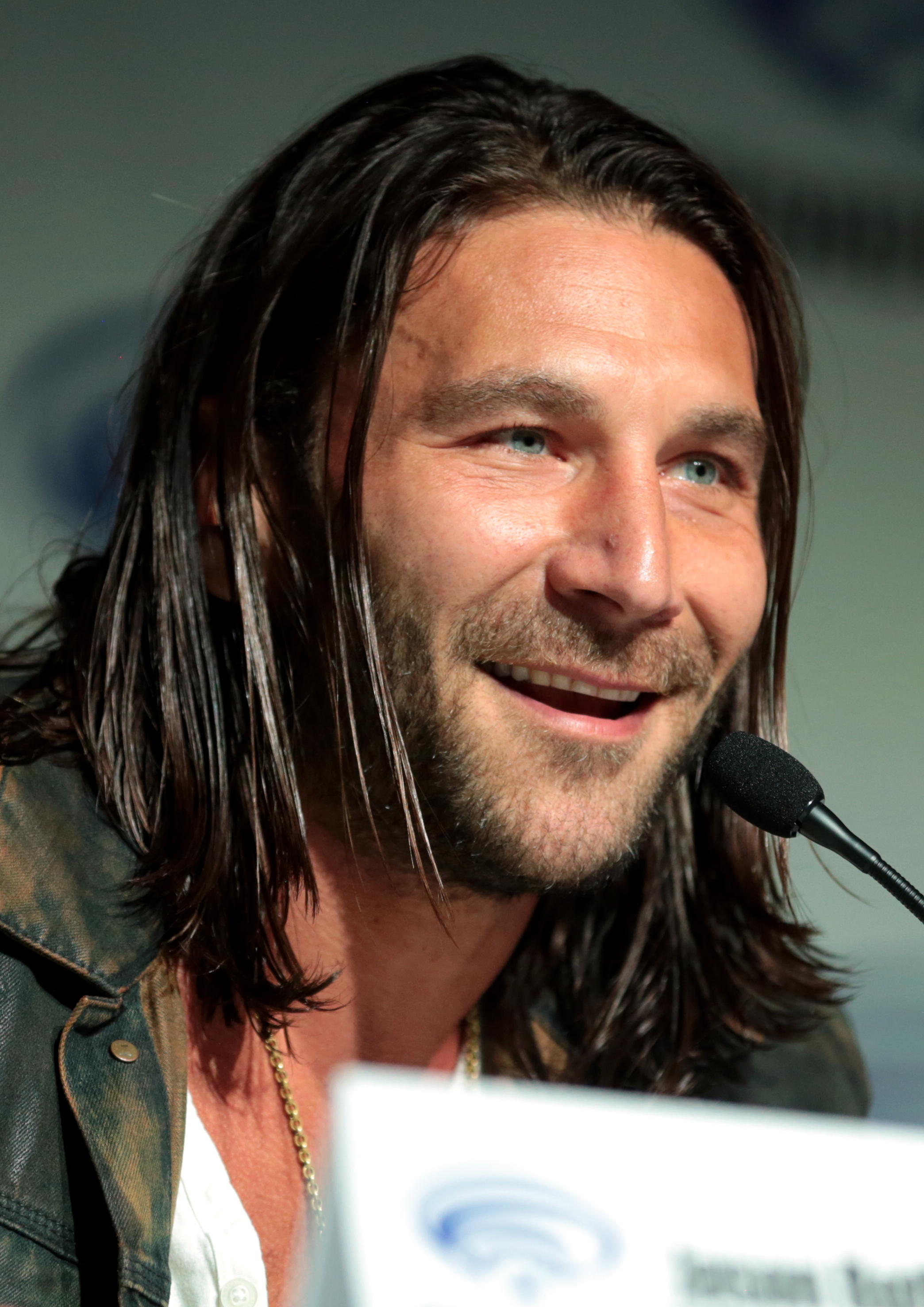
Zach McGowan

- Justin, portrayed by Zach McGowan, is a Savior who has no interest in working with Rick and the other communities, and loyal to Negan's order. He maintains a strong rivalry with Daryl and is indirectly responsible for Aaron losing his forearm. After disappearing, Justin is found reanimated by Maggie and Kal, and put down. Justin is discovered to have been murdered with the subsequent investigation revealing that the women of Oceanside are exacting revenge upon the Saviors, who attacked their community by the order of Simon. He was killed by Beatrice with a speargun in retaliation for murdering her husband.
- Jed, portrayed by Rhys Coiro, is a highly antagonistic Savior following the war between the communities. Jed works on the bridge construction and is furious at the murder of Justin. He attacks Carol alongside D.J. to try to extort guns, but is defeated by Rick and Carol though his life is spared. He leads the Saviors in abandoning the bridge project, but later returns with a gun he stole off of Alden, provoking a fight at the camp near the bridge, killing several people. Six years later, Jed is the leader of a group of several former Saviors who act as raiders following the collapse of the Sanctuary. After he attacks Carol and her adopted son, Henry, Carol burns Jed and his group alive in the dead of night. After the Highwaymen settle into the area, it is suggested that Carol killing Jed and his group allowed the Highwaymen to take over their territory.

=== The Kingdom ===
The Kingdom, first appearing in "The Well", is a protected community like the Hilltop Colony and Alexandria Safe-Zone, led by its charismatic and peaceful leader "King Ezekiel". Over time, the community is subjugated by the Saviors until the arrival of Rick, who manages to convince Ezekiel to fight for their freedom.

- Benjamin, portrayed by Logan Miller, is a young soldier from the Kingdom and Morgan's protégé. During a routine supply drop-off with a group of Saviors, led by Gavin, Jared shoots him in the leg which causes it to bleed out and later dies. Morgan prevents him from reanimating and becomes vengeful toward the Saviors as a result, as does Henry, Benjamin's younger brother. Benjamin's death is eventually avenged when Morgan kills Jared.
- Richard, portrayed by Karl Makinen, is a soldier from the Kingdom. He hates the Saviors and is obsessed to get rid of them, but is strangled and killed by Morgan after he indirectly causes Benjamin's death.
- Diane, portrayed by Kerry Cahill, one of Ezekiel's top soldiers, is an expert in the use of the bow and arrow.
- Daniel, portrayed by Daniel Newman, is one of Ezekiel's top soldiers. He is massacred together with other Kingdom soldiers in a surprise assault by a Savior using a machine gun. He later revives, but Alvaro puts him down.
- Alvaro, portrayed by Carlos Navarro, is one of Ezekiel's top soldiers. He is killed by Gunther, who takes Ezekiel hostage.

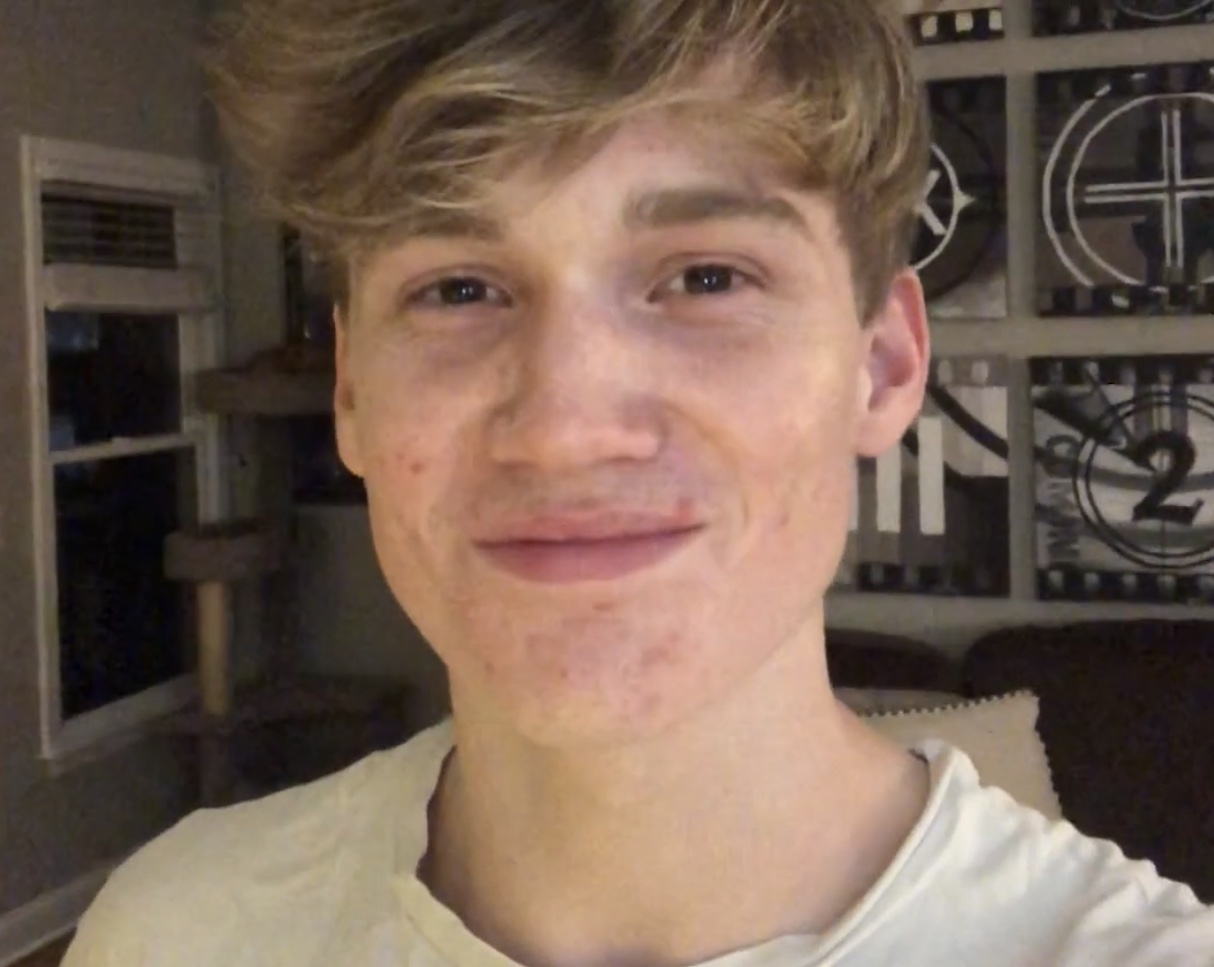
Matt Lintz

- Henry, portrayed by Macsen Lintz (young) and Matt Lintz (teenager), is a resident of the Kingdom and Benjamin's naive younger brother. Following Benjamin's death, Henry is trained in armed and unarmed combat by Carol and Morgan at his request and fights in the war against the Saviors against their wishes. Henry kills the Savior lieutenant Gavin and later attempts to discover the identity of his brother's killer, without success. After the war against Negan and the Saviors, he is adopted by Ezekiel and Carol. Six years after Rick's supposed death at the destruction of the bridge, he works to keep the Kingdom from falling apart; he travels to the Hilltop Colony to apprentice as a blacksmith. He falls in love with Lydia, the daughter of Alpha, the leader of the Whisperers. In "The Calm Before", Henry is murdered by Alpha alongside several others, and his severed head is displayed on a spike.
- Kevin, portrayed by Jason Burkey, is a resident of the Kingdom. During the Savior attack in "Do Not Send Us Astray", he is shot in the arm with a tainted arrow and turns into a walker that night. The reanimated Kevin is put down by Ezekiel.
- Nabila, portrayed by Nadine Marissa, is a gardener of the Kingdom. Following the two timeskips, Nabila has begun a relationship with Jerry and has three children with him.
- Dana, portrayed by Peggy Sheffield, is the Kingdom's doctor who was a surgeon before the outbreak. Before the Saviors attack on the Hilltop Colony, she meets with Siddiq and is initially unimpressed with him, but warms up to Siddiq when he stands up to her. Around 4:00 a.m. the next morning, Dana investigates a disturbance in the infirmary and is attacked by a zombified Tobin who bites her in the neck. Turned into a walker herself, she joined the attack on the main house and was eventually put down by Daryl.
- Kurt, portrayed by Nick Arapoglou, is a medic for the Kingdom. While going to get help for the ill Kevin, he is bitten on the neck and turned by a zombified Tobin and joins the other walkers in attacking the main house of the Hilltop Colony. During the walker attack, he pinned to a wall by Jesus while Michonne puts him down with a katana through the head.
- Shiva is a female Bengal tiger and King Ezekiel's loyal pet and companion. She is trained to viciously attack those hostile to the Kingdom, including Saviors and walkers alike. However, she later sacrifices herself to a horde of walkers in order to let Ezekiel, Jerry, and Carol escape following a bloody conflict with the Saviors. Following the two timeskips, the Kingdom is shown to keep a stuffed tiger on display in Shiva's honor. During production, there is no actual tiger and, in most cases, she is added in as CGI in post-production. Where Shiva is shown interacting with other characters such as pouncing a character, this is done by an actor wearing a full blue body-suit to mimic the tiger's actions and using chroma key effects in post-production to add the tiger's body.

=== Oceanside ===
Oceanside, first appearing in "Swear", is a community in Virginia in a pre-apocalypse campground near a small beach. With the arrival of Tara Chambler, things gradually changed for the community. Sometime after the outbreak, Natania's community encountered Simon and his group, and they were forced to work under their tyranny. Unwilling to be subservient, the community fought back but were defeated in the ensuing skirmish, and many people were killed, including most of Natania's family.

After the battle, Simon and his men rounded up all remaining male survivors over the age of 10 and executed them, as retribution and a terrorizing deterrent to any further resistances. This was done by Simon before his group joined Negan and the Saviors. Faced with a future of being enslaved by Simon or dying, the remaining women and children fled their settlement, found the Oceanside campground, and re-established their community there where Natania led them to cowardice, hidden from Simon and his group.

They adopted a policy to kill anyone on sight who discovers their community, in order to protect themselves. After Enid accidentally shoots and kills Natania, Cyndie becomes the leader of the community and decides to join the Militia in order to defeat Negan and the Saviors. Six years after Rick's supposed death at the destruction of the bridge, Oceanside becomes one of the four joint communities of the Militia and later on the Coalition, along with the Alexandria Safe-Zone, the Hilltop Colony and the Kingdom.

- Natania, portrayed by Deborah May, is the leader of Oceanside. Aaron and Enid set out to Oceanside to recruit their assistance in the upcoming war, but Natania is shot in self-defense by Enid when she attacks Aaron later that night.
- Cyndie, portrayed by Sydney Park, is a member of Oceanside and Natania's maternal granddaughter who forms a friendship with Tara. Following her grandmother's death, Cyndie becomes the new leader of Oceanside. Her younger brother was brutally murdered by Arat in retaliation for an earlier rebellion by Oceanside. Eighteen months after the war, Cyndie gets revenge when she executes Arat with a spear to the head for her actions.
- Rachel Ward, portrayed by Mimi Kirkland (young) and Avianna Mynhier (teenager), is an aggressive young member of Oceanside who does not support Tara. Eight and a half years after the war with the Saviors, a grown up Rachel appears as a leader of Oceanside who signs Michonne's charter on behalf of her community.
- Beatrice, portrayed by Briana Venskus, is a top member of Oceanside, and Cyndie's right-hand. Her husband was murdered by the Savior Justin in retaliation for Oceanside's rebellion against the Saviors. Eighteen months after the war, she gets her revenge by killing Justin with her speargun. In "A Certain Doom", a Whisperer spots Beatrice and Carol and tries to attack them but Carol stabs her in the gut and throws her to the ground. The two try to get away but The Whisperer grabs Beatrice's leg and stabs it, making her scream, and the walkers to grab her. Carol walks away as she gets devoured.
- Kathy, portrayed by Nicole Barré, is a top member of Oceanside. During Jed's rebellion, she is killed and later reanimates. She is found reanimated at the bridge camp by Rick alongside a reanimated Norris and a Kingdom resident. Rick manages to kill all three once more with his Colt Python despite his weakened state.
- Jules, portrayed by Alex Sgambati, is a member of Oceanside, that is flirting with Luke. She's a good archer.

=== The Scavengers ===
The Scavengers, commonly referred to as the "Garbage People", first appearing in "Rock in the Road", is a large group of odd individuals who live in a junkyard. They are led by a cunning woman named Anne, who calls herself "Jadis". On their way to find Gabriel, Rick and a few other members of his group run into the Scavengers, who takes them into the Junkyard. There, Rick strikes a deal with Jadis, with him agreeing to provide the Scavengers with weapons and supplies in exchange for their help fighting the Saviors. At some point after this, however, Jadis and her people secretly make a deal with Negan and the Saviors, and inform Negan of Rick's plan to initiate a war against him.

In "The First Day of the Rest of Your Life", they reveal their betrayal to Rick's group and their service and loyalty to Negan. However, during the war the Scavengers are revealed to be collaborating with Rick in the war by revealing a neutral stance. The entire community except Jadis is annihilated by Simon and a Savior patrol. Afterwards, Jadis lures the zombified Scavengers up a hill to a metal grinder which she activates. One by one, the zombified Scavengers walk into the machine and are completely pulped, leaving Jadis the only survivor.

- Tamiel, portrayed by Sabrina Gennarino, is a member of the Scavengers and the right-hand of Jadis. She is killed by Simon.
- Brion, portrayed by Thomas Francis Murphy, is a lieutenant member of the Scavengers. He is killed by Simon.
- Winslow, portrayed by Gino Crognale, is a zombified member of the Scavengers; nothing is known about Winslow's life prior to the outbreak. At some point in the outbreak, Winslow was living in the Junkyard community; however, he later died of unknown ;causes. The residents of the Junkyard community did not put him down, but instead, covered him in armor and spikes. Winslow is first seen behind Rick, covered in armor and spikes after he is pushed into a pit. Rick is frightened by him. As Winslow comes closer, Rick tries to push him away, having one of his spikes go through his hand in the process. Winslow proceeds to come closer to Rick again, Rick kicks him away, cutting himself again. Rick then uses the wall of garbage to slow Winslow down. Winslow is buried in garbage and Rick decapitates him.
- Farron, portrayed by Anja Asktin, is a member of the Scavengers. When she and Michonne take sniper positions atop a townhouse as they prepare to battle the Saviors. When Michonne realizes the Scavengers betrayed the Alexandria Safe-Zone, she turns around to find Farron pointing her weapon at her. As a gun fight breaks out in the streets below, Farron and Michonne engage in a scuffle. As Farron bashes Michonne's head into the ground, Michonne grabs a piece of a broken flower pot and stabs Farron. However, Farron still manages to overcome Michonne, attempting to throw her over the balcony. With all of her might, Michonne is able to overpower Farron and send her over the balcony to her death. Her mangled body is observed in the streets as Rick and Carl search for Michonne.

=== Magna's Group ===
Magna's group, first appearing in "What Comes After", is a small group of survivors barely getting by before encountering Judith Grimes.

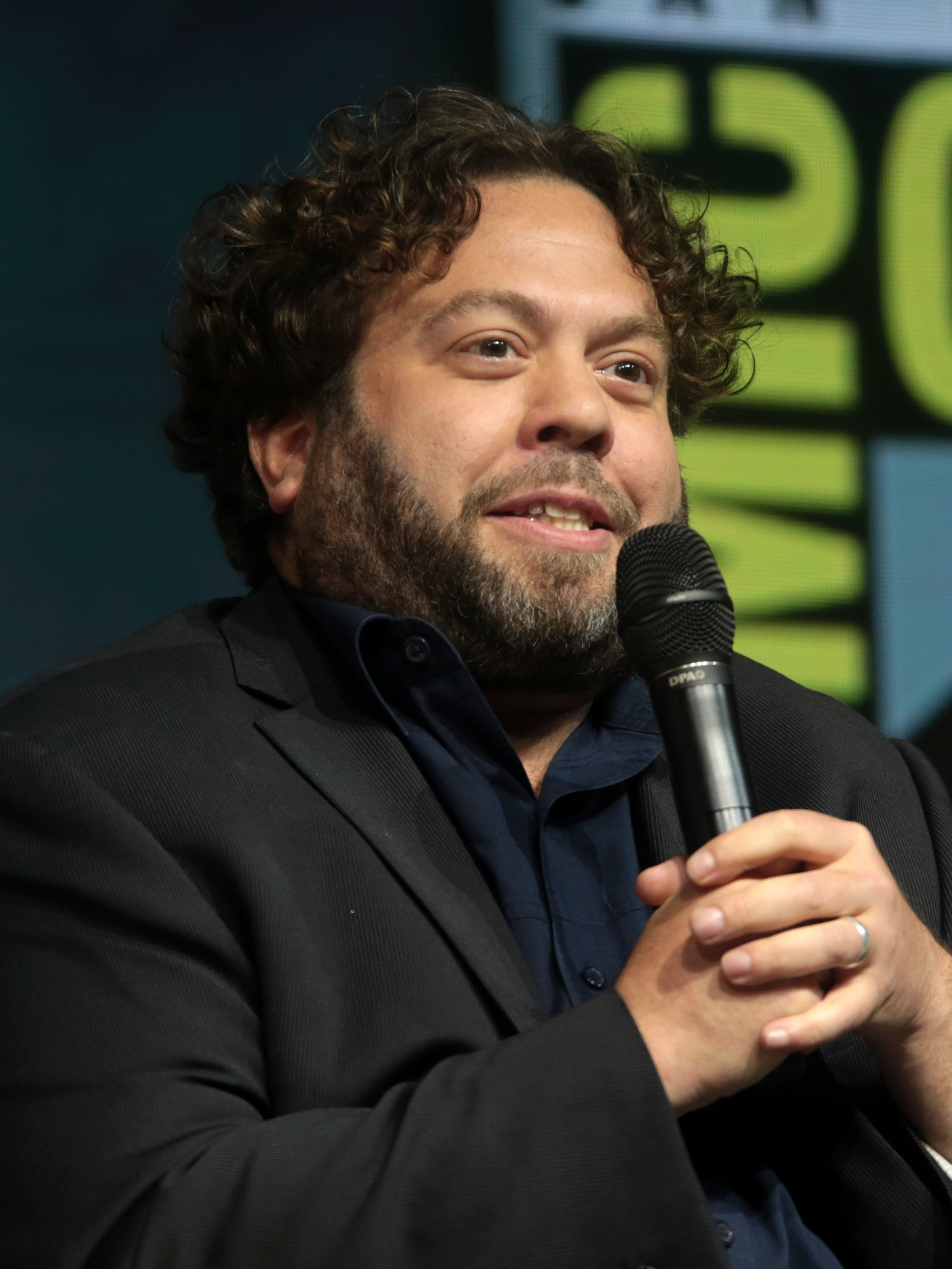
Dan Fogler

- Luke, portrayed by Dan Fogler, is a member of Magna's group who has come to appreciate safety in numbers.

=== The Whisperers ===
The Whisperers, first appearing in "Who Are You Now?", is a group of savage and hostile survivors. This group camouflages with the skins of walkers, aiming to live among them without being attacked. They use the undead as weapons to stun people, and usually attack with sharp weapons and are more bloodthirsty and aggressive than the Saviors. The Whisperers serve as antagonists for the second half of the ninth season and whole of the tenth season.

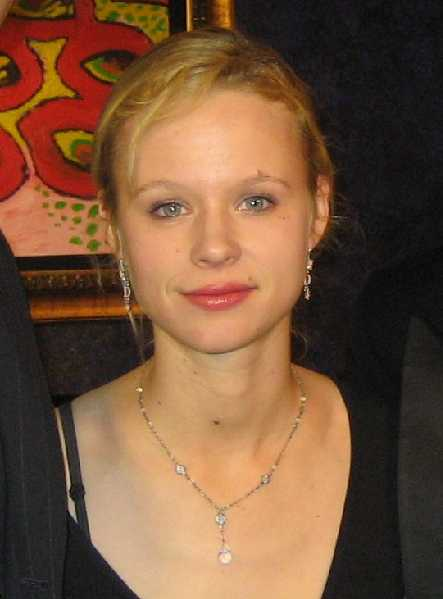
Thora Birch

- Mary (also known as "Gamma"), portrayed by Thora Birch, is a high-ranking member of The Whisperers. She is shown to be very capable of cold-blooded murder as seen when she fed her own sister, Frances, alive to a group of walkers in order to protect Alpha. After saving Alpha's life to prove her loyalty, Mary becomes the third-in-command of The Whisperers and very protective of Alpha. Despite her claimed lack of remorse for her sister's death, Mary appears to show some amount of guilt and anger for her actions. She also seems unnerved by the sight of all the savage murders carried out by The Whisperers and appears to be increasingly fearful of Alpha. Mary is also sent by Alpha to gather information from Aaron after he offers her dressing for a wound. As she got to know Aaron, her guard begins to lower, though she quickly re-enforces her loyalty to Alpha. However, after she learns Lydia was not actually killed by Alpha in The Whisperers' name, Mary becomes distraught, suffering a temporarily mental breakdown and breaks down crying. She then ultimately betrays The Whisperers by giving Aaron information in exchange for details about her nephew, Adam, whom Mary gained a newfound affection for. The information Mary offers to Aaron is the location of Alpha's herd. When the main group went to investigate, the herd was not there and they are led into a trap. Whether or not Mary meant for this to happen is unknown, but she decides to join the ranks of Aaron's group. In "Walk with Us", she is stabbed in the stomach and disemboweled by Beta, killing her. Later, she is put down by Alden after reanimation.
- Dante, portrayed by Juan Javier Cardenas, is a member of The Whisperers who works as a spy in the Alexandria Safe-Zone posing as a doctor. He sows dissent and paranoia for several months before being identified by Siddiq, whom he kills to protect his identity. He is later imprisoned and interrogated, before finally being brutally murdered by Gabriel as vengeance for Siddiq's death.
- Rufus, portrayed by Mark Sivertsen, member of The Whisperers, who was with Beta and another Whisperer when they discovered Alpha's head decapitated in the pikes, after seeing Alpha's head on a pike, Rufus claims that Beta is the new "Alpha" now, enraging him. Beta forces Rufus' head closer to Alpha in order to "hear her", which leads to his ear being ripped off. Later, Rufus' infection causes him to cough, which attracts a nearby walker, as Rufus is about to kill the walker, Beta stabs him through the back with a knife and allows him to be devoured.
- Frances, portrayed by Juliet Brett, a member of The Whisperers and Mary's sister, who abandoned her son under Alpha's orders, killed by her own sister Mary throwing her towards the walkers when she tries to kill Alpha.

=== The Highwaymen ===
The Highwaymen, first appearing in "Chokepoint", is a group of bandit survivors very similar to the Saviors who wanted to extort the Kingdom. When confronted by Ezekiel and Carol, they decide to move to the ranks of the Kingdom.

- Ozzy, portrayed by Angus Sampson, is the leader of the Highwaymen. When he is cornered by Ezekiel and Carol to propose an opportunity for a new change of direction and render loyalty to the Kingdom (in exchange for watching movies and being part of their community), Ozzy accepts. He is eventually killed and beheaded by Alpha.
- Alek, portrayed by Jason Kirkpatrick, is Ozzy's right-hand man. He is also killed and beheaded by Alpha.
- Margo, portrayed by Jerri Tubbs, is the de facto leader of the Highwaymen. When she attacks Lydia, Negan comes to her aid and throws Margo off her into a wall, accidentally slamming her head against it and killing her.
- Alfred, portrayed by David Shae, is a member of the Highwaymen. He is a soldier for the Coalition and Margo's friend who resents Lydia. He is killed by Beta by an accurate stab in the belly opening his stomach, this then allows his reanimation; an Alexandrian later ends his misery.

=== Bloodsworth Island ===
Bloodsworth Island, first appearing in "What We Become", is an island located in Tangier Sound in Chesapeake Bay (Maryland). Prior to the outbreak, the island was used as a naval base, with the U.S. Navy stockpiling large amounts of heavy weaponry on it. The base was presumably abandoned by the Navy either during or sometime after the outbreak. At some point, it was settled by Virgil and his family. However, after his family's death, Virgil began to lose his mind and began imprisoning the other residents. However, several of the prisoners died, leaving only four people left (including Virgil).

- Virgil, portrayed by Kevin Carroll, is a survivor who is desperately trying to get home to his family. He served as the primary antagonist of the episode "What We Become". Virgil first appears in "The World Before", in which he saves Luke from a walker in a library, and then in Oceanside, where he is captured by Judith and Michonne. At the beginning, the group believes that he is a Whisperer spy, but then he reveals to them that he is only raising provisions in order to reunite with his family and also reveals to Michonne about a powerful armament that he has on the island. She decides to release him since he does not seem to be a threat and soon departs with Virgil to collect weapons from the island. Later, as the other island residents pack up, Michonne informs Virgil that the others are willing to let him come along. Virgil is surprised by this and considers it for a moment, but ultimately decides to stay on the island to be with his family.
- Celeste, portrayed by Eve Gordon, is a resident of Bloodsworth Island who worked as a researcher on the island alongside Virgil and Jeremiah.
- Jeremiah, portrayed by Taylor Nichols, is a resident of Bloodsworth Island who worked as a researcher on the island alongside Virgil and Celeste.
- Lucy, portrayed by Olivia Stambouliah, is a resident of Bloodsworth Island who worked as a janitor in the island's research facility.

=== Survivor Caravan ===
The Survivor Caravan, first appearing in "What We Become", is a massive group of nomadic survivors traveling throughout the Northern United States to an unknown destination. Upon her arrival to New Jersey, Michonne and two other survivors make their way towards the convoy.

- Aiden, portrayed by Breeda Wool, is a member of a survivor caravan who was rescued and helped by Michonne.
- Bailey, portrayed by Andrew Bachelor, is Aiden's friend. When Michonne helps them, they go with her to an unknown destination.

=== The Wardens ===
When Georgie's community was destroyed by The Reapers Maggie left with some members to help Alexandria, Hilltop and The Kingdom against the threat of The Whisperers.

- Elijah, portrayed by Okea Eme-Akwari, is a mysterious and masked member of the Wardens. He first appears in "A Certain Doom" saving Alden and Aaron from a group of Whisperers.
- Cole, portrayed by James Devoti, is a trusted member of the Wardens.
- Hershel Rhee, portrayed by Peyton Lockridge, is the son of Maggie and Glenn. He is named in honor of his grandfather, Hershel Greene. He first appears in "A New Beginning" with his mother and resides at the Hilltop Colony.

=== Miscellaneous characters ===
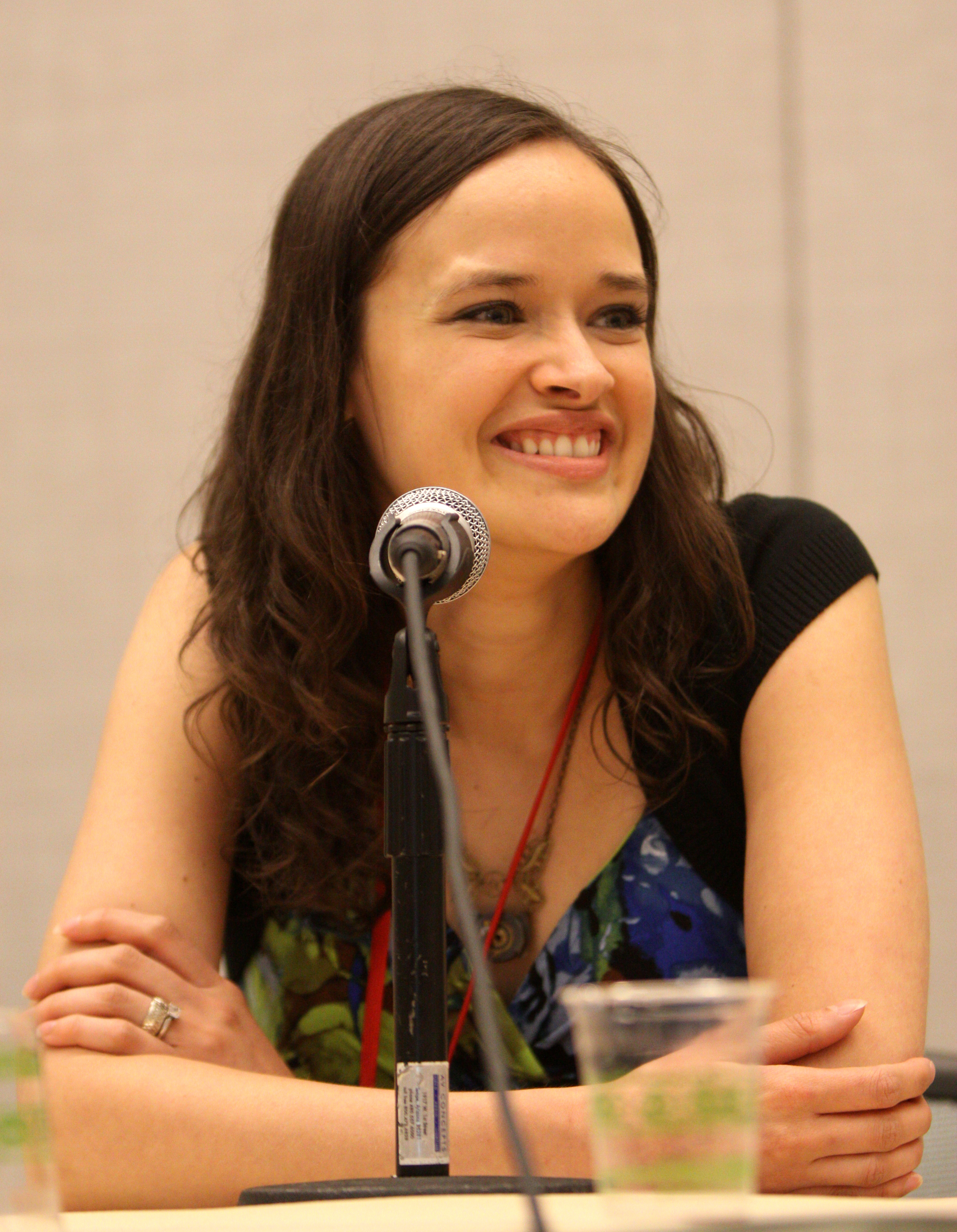
Brina Palencia

- Ana, portrayed by Brina Palencia, is a survivor encountered by Rick and Carol while on a supply run. Ana, who has a limp, is holed up in a house with her boyfriend, Sam. She and Sam were separated from the refugee group they were with and left on their own for days. Rick gets to know them and decides they are worthy of joining the prison community. After Carol tends to Sam's wounds, Sam and Ana volunteer to help forage for supplies. Carol agrees, but Rick is reluctant, noting they seem ill-equipped to protect themselves. However, Rick reluctantly complies with the group consensus, gives them guns, and tells them to meet back at the house in two hours. Rick and Carol later discover Ana's tattooed leg amputated, and then some distance away her deceased body being devoured by walkers, with Sam nowhere to be found.
- Leon Basset, portrayed by Linds Edwards, is a deputy sheriff at the King County Police Department who, along with his partner Lambert Kendell, works with Rick and Shane. During the car chase in the first episode, Leon, along with Rick, Shane, and Lambert, prepare for gunfire. It is shown that Leon is new to firearms, as Rick instructs him how to use one in the field. Post-outbreak, Leon becomes a walker and is put down by Rick outside the station house before Rick leaves for Atlanta.
- Allen, portrayed by Daniel Thomas May, is Donna's husband and Ben's father. The three travel to the prison with Tyreese's group, where Donna dies. After Rick banishes Tyreese's group from the prison, Allen survives with them for several days in the forest and travels with them to Woodbury, where he and his son Ben join The Governor's army. Gradually, Allen is shown to have dark intentions, first made evident in his initial proposal to take over the prison, next in his grudge against Tyreese for making Donna revere him instead of Allen, and ultimately in his willingness to do anything to stay at Woodbury. Allen is among the Woodbury army that attacks the prison; they are defeated by Rick's group, leading them to retreat. When the Woodbury army retreats and abandons their plans for takeover, Allen stands by The Governor's order to return to the prison, wanting to avenge his son's death. An enraged Governor kills the civilian army members, prompting a shocked Allen to draw his gun on The Governor. Allen does not shoot, however, and The Governor shoots Allen in the head, killing him.
- Ben, portrayed by Tyler Chase, is Allen and Donna's son, and a member of Tyreese's group. He supports his father's plot to take over the prison, which Tyreese thwarts. After Rick banishes Tyreese's group from the prison, Ben survives with them for several days in the forest and travels with them to Woodbury where, with his father, he joins The Governor's army. In "This Sorrowful Life", he dies when he steps in front of a bullet meant for The Governor and Merle shoots him in the chest. After Merle is killed, the reanimated Merle eats an arm off of Ben's corpse.
- Donna, portrayed by Cherie Dvorak, is Allen's wife and Ben's mother. She travels with them and Tyreese's group and is bitten right before entering the prison. Sasha proposes putting her down outside of the prison, but Allen and Ben beg Tyreese to spare her. Tyreese complies and is forced to carry her when she proves too heavy for Allen, who sits on the floor when being chased by walkers and gives up. Donna soon dies of her wound, and Tyreese kills her before she reanimates

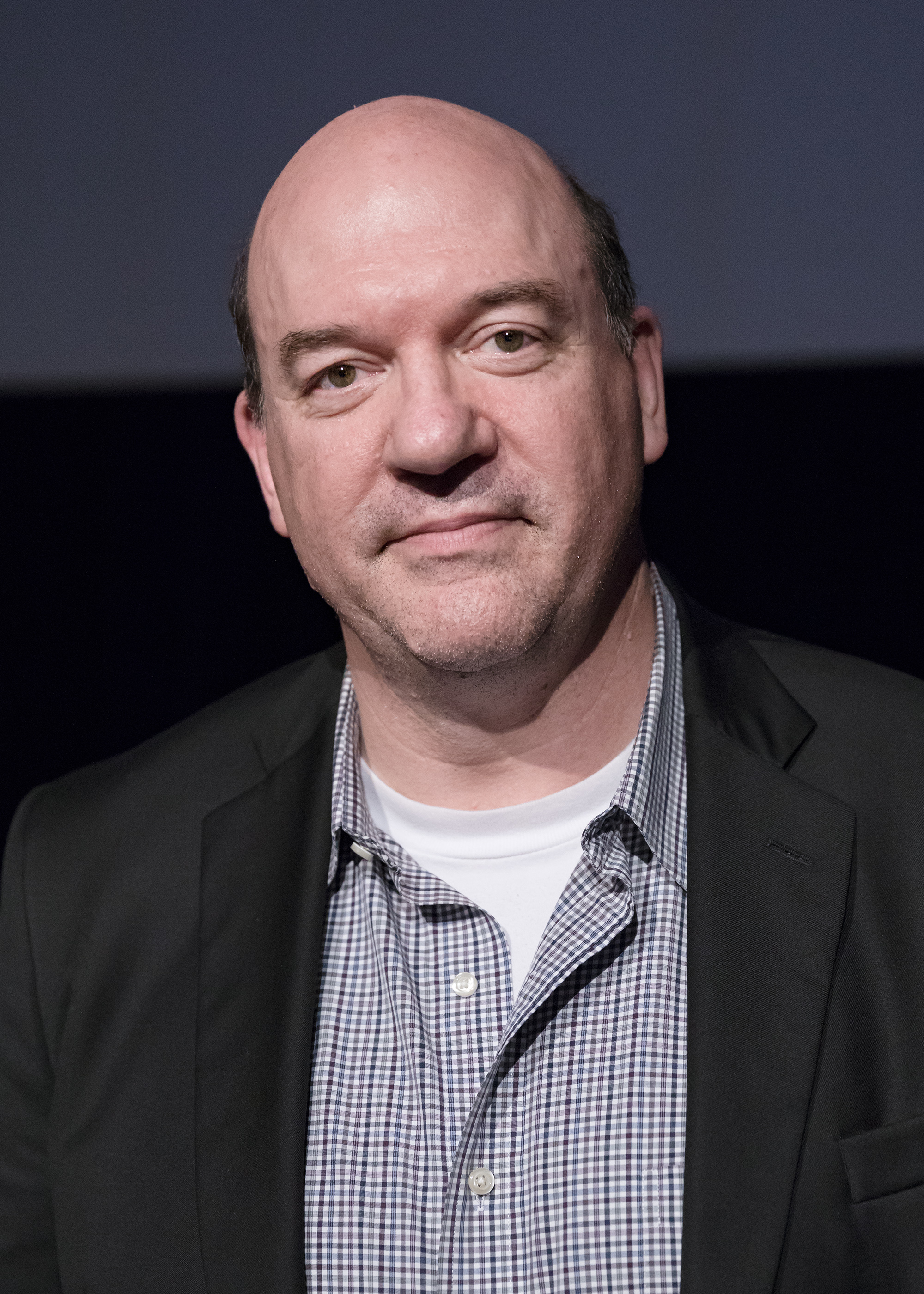
John Carroll Lynch

- Eastman, portrayed by John Carroll Lynch, is encountered when Morgan leaves King County. He is a psychologist who used to analyze prisoners. Eastman eventually rehabilitates Morgan teaching him how life is precious, thus cementing Morgan's return to sanity. The former prison psychologist also helps Morgan find inner peace through the use of aikido. After being bitten, Eastman dies and is prevented from reanimating by Morgan.

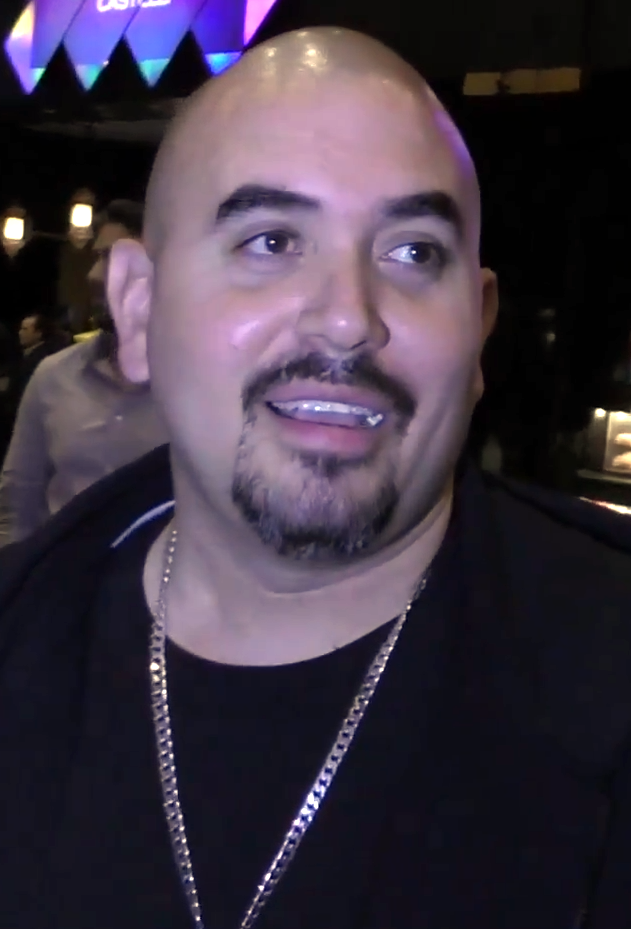
Noel Gugliemi

- Felipe, portrayed by Noel Gugliemi, is a tough guy associate of Guillermo's and the grandson of "Abuela" (portrayed by Gina Morelli). He is actually a nurse practitioner at the retirement home, who decides to stay behind with the rest and help the elderly ("Vatos").

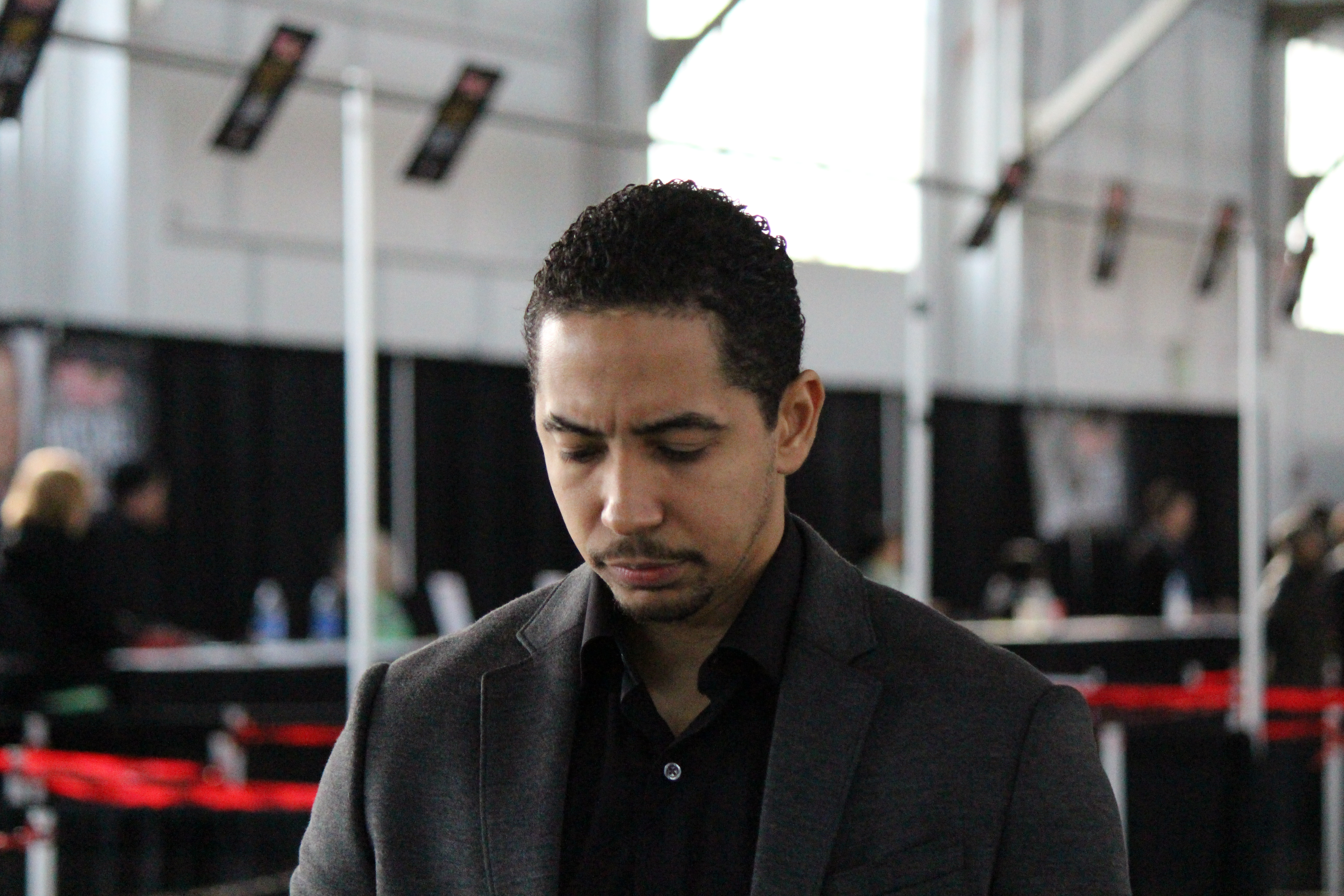
Neil Brown Jr.

- Guillermo, portrayed by Neil Brown Jr., his associate Felipe, and others protect a nursing home full of the elderly after it gets mostly abandoned. They come into conflict with Rick and his group when they fight over the weapons Rick dropped in downtown Atlanta. A deleted scene from "What Lies Ahead" reveals that most, if not all, of the nursing home survivors were killed execution style (hinting at the handiwork of humans) and not by walkers.

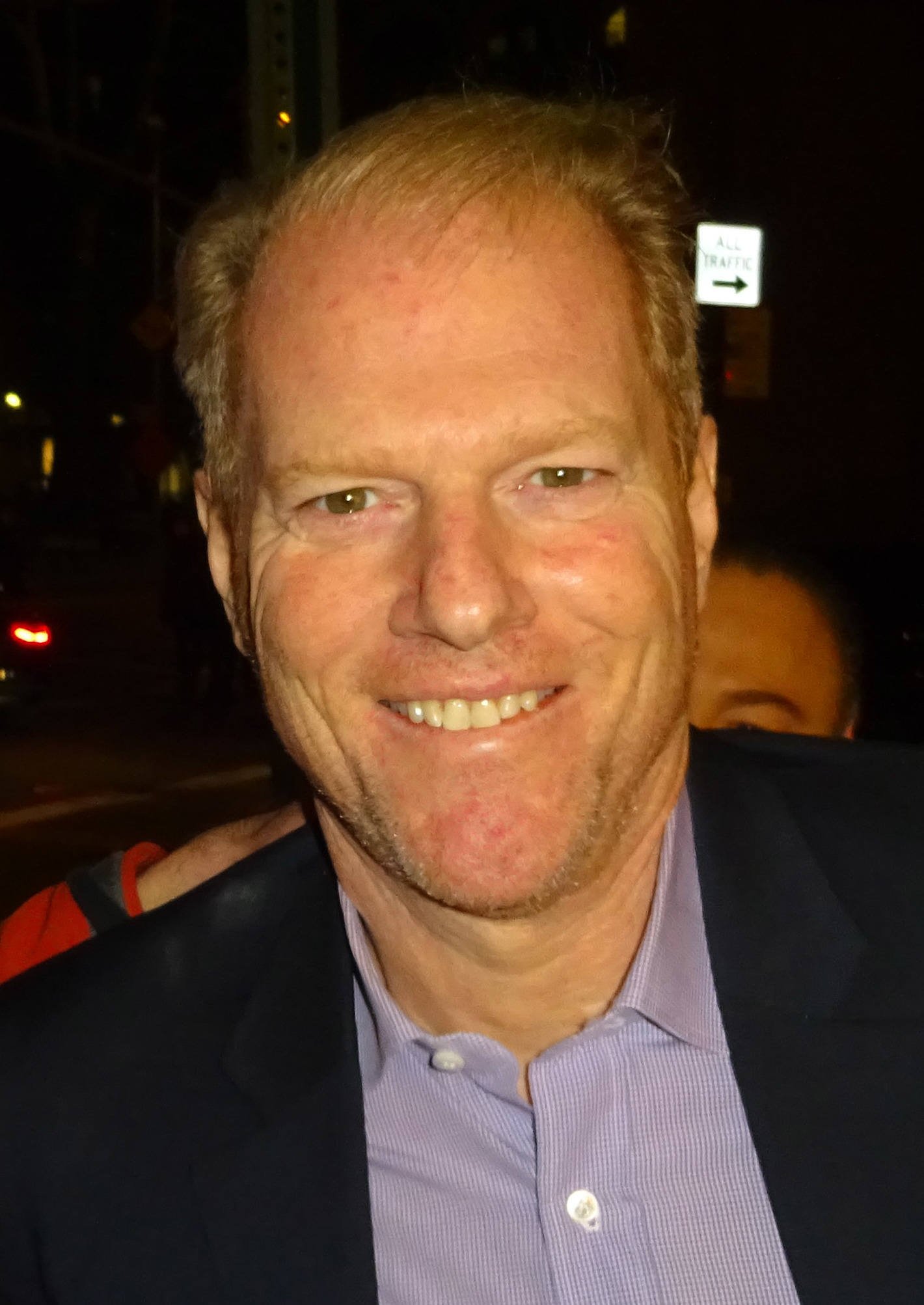
Noah Emmerich

- Dr. Edwin Jenner, portrayed by Noah Emmerich, is the last surviving staff pathologist at the CDC in Atlanta. Working with surviving samples of infected tissue, he attempts to create a possible cure, but repeatedly fails. When the Grimes group arrives at the CDC looking for help or survivors, he hesitates to assist and only allows them in once the walkers have them surrounded. He reveals that his wife succumbed to the disease and provided his few tissue samples; he later accidentally destroys them due to fatigue. Despairing, he attempts to lock the group in the CDC building, which is programmed to self-destruct when its fuel runs out. However, he relents and allows them to flee shortly before the building is destroyed. He and Jacqui elect to die in the explosion. Before parting ways with Rick for the last time, Jenner whispers to him (as shown in "TS-19") that everyone carries the infection and will reanimate after expiring, no matter how they die (as revealed in "Beside the Dying Fire").
- Duane Jones, portrayed by Adrian Kali Turner, is Morgan's son. In the first episode, he finds Rick and knocks him out, mistaking him for a walker. Duane stays with his father when Rick offers to take them to Atlanta. When Rick encounters Morgan again in the third season, Morgan explains that Duane was killed by his undead mother. "Duane Jones" also happens to be the name of the late actor, who starred as the heroic protagonist "Ben" in the original zombie movie Night of the Living Dead (1968). Whether or not Duane was put down by Morgan upon reanimating is unknown; it remains ambiguous whether Morgan put him down or allowed him to "survive" as a walker, like his mother.
- Lambert Kendal, portrayed by Jim Coleman, is a deputy sheriff working at the King County Sheriff's Department, along with his partner Leon Basset and co-workers Rick and Shane. He is seen during the car chase with Rick, Shane, and Leon in the first episode.

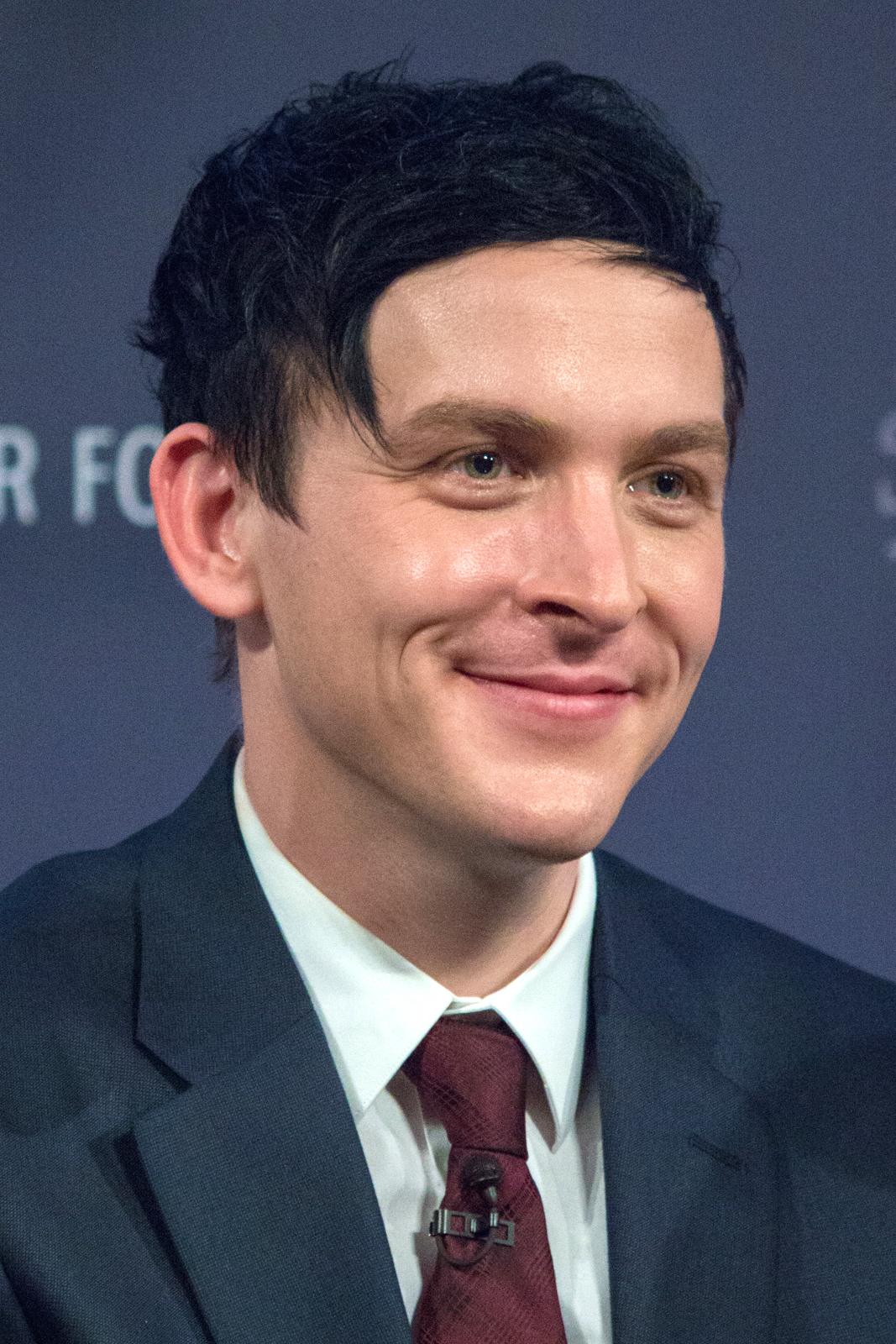
Robin Lord Taylor

- Sam, portrayed by Robin Lord Taylor, is a survivor encountered by Rick and Carol on a supply run, holed up in the bathroom of an abandoned house with his girlfriend Ana. They had come from a refugee center, became separated from their group, and were left out on their own for days. After Carol tends to Sam's dislocated arm and other wounds, Sam and Ana volunteer to help forage for supplies. Carol agrees, but Rick is reluctant, noting the pair seems ill-equipped to protect themselves. However, Rick reluctantly complies with the group consensus; he gives them guns and gives Sam his watch so Sam can know when two hours have passed so they can meet back at the house. Rick and Carol later discover Ana's deceased body being devoured by walkers, with Sam nowhere to be found. It is later revealed that Sam had been captured at Terminus, where he gets hit in the head with a baseball bat and then gets his throat slit to be bled out in a trough along with three other captives.
- Lieutenant Welles, portrayed by Julio Cesar Cedillo, is a National Guard pilot. After his helicopter crashes, he is the only survivor. The Governor finds Welles and brings him to Woodbury, where he has Dr. Stevens care for him. After discovering the whereabouts of Welles' men, The Governor takes his own enforcers and kills the soldiers, appropriating their food, supplies, and equipment. He later puts Welles' severed head in an aquarium, alongside other heads in his collection. It is unclear whether or not Welles' head was among those damaged in The Governor's struggle with Michonne.

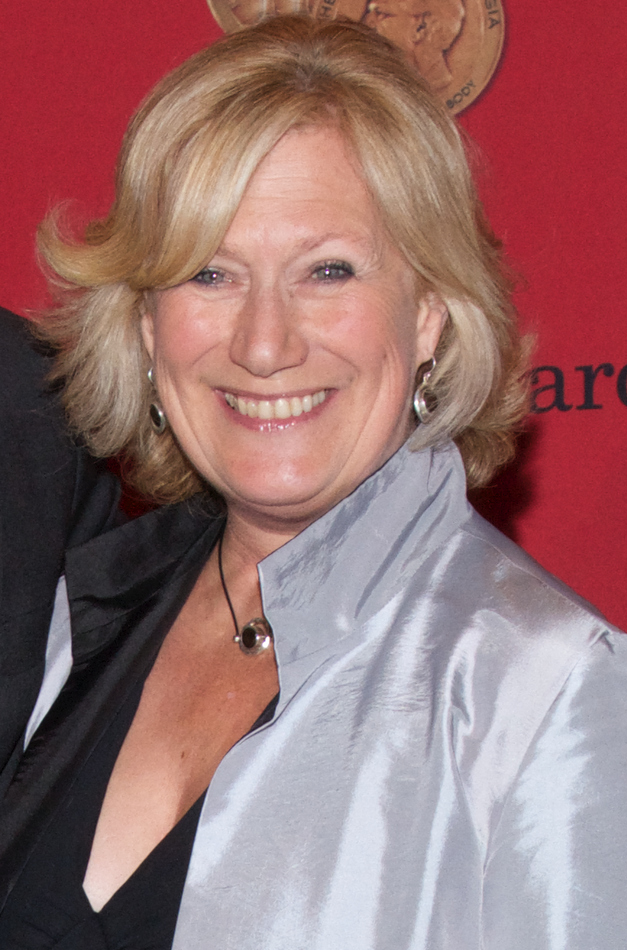
Jayne Atkinson

- Georgie, portrayed by Jayne Atkinson, first appears in "The Key". She is the leader of a mysterious humanitarian group who helps Maggie with supplies and food in exchange for some vinyl records. Georgie also gives Maggie a book that would help her build the new civilization. Eighteen months later, she is mentioned as exchanging letters with Maggie and wanting Maggie to join her group full-time. In "Stradivarius", it is revealed that Maggie has left the Hilltop Colony to join Georgie's group and aid them with a new community somewhere far away.

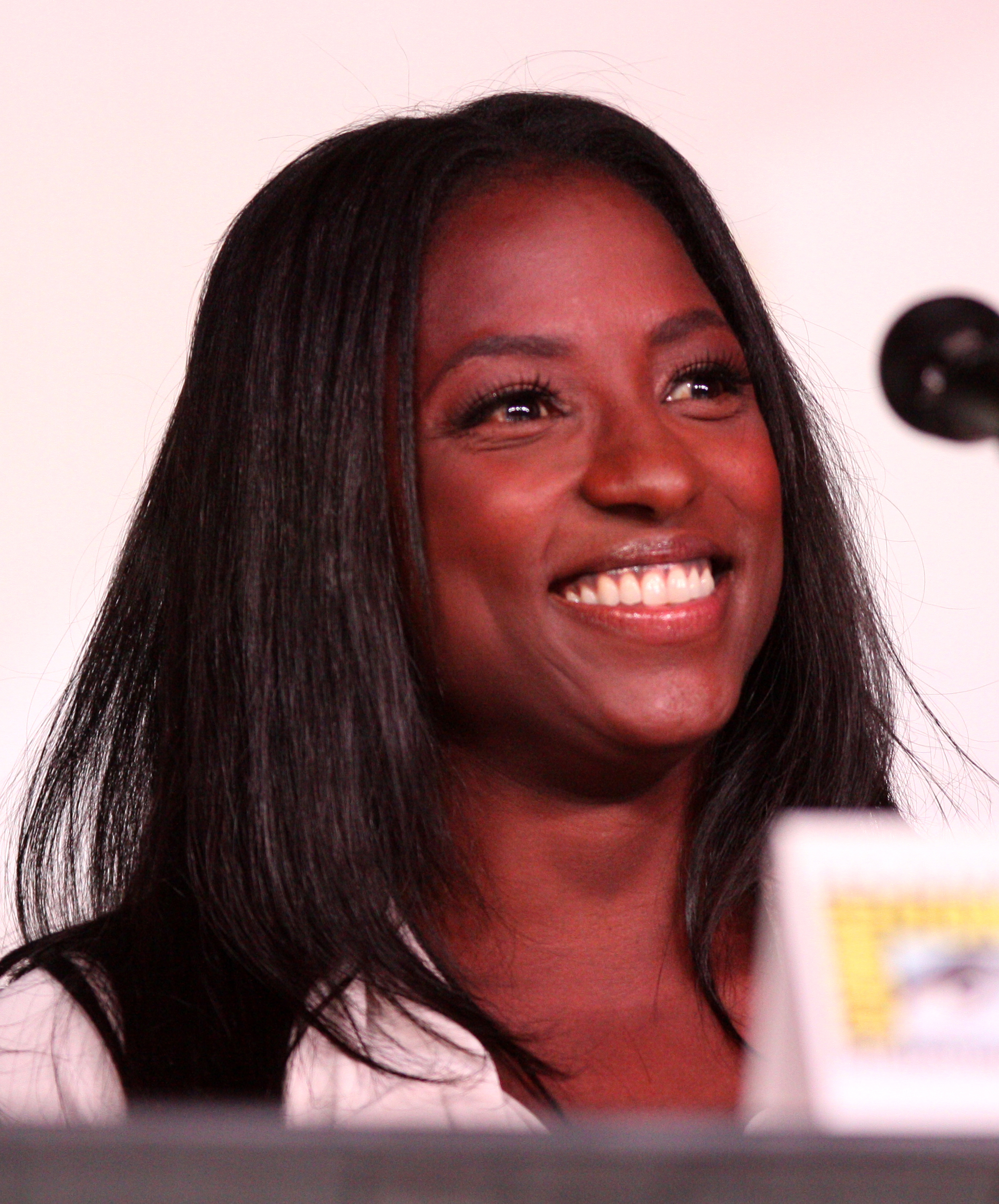
Rutina Wesley

- Jocelyn, portrayed by Rutina Wesley, is an old friend of Michonne and the leader of a cult of orphaned children she trained and manipulated to do her bidding. She served as the primary antagonist of the episode "Scars". Jocelyn is shown to be a cruel, cunning, manipulative, and psychopathic woman who is a determined survivor and effective leader to the children in her group. After Jocelyn's group is found by a group from the Alexandria Safe-Zone in the woods, they are brought to the community where Michonne recognizes her as her friend from college and decides to let her group stay. At night, Michonne tells Jocelyn that she's impressed with the kids' hunting skills and Jocelyn tells Michonne that the kids are capable of anything. In the middle of the night, Jocelyn and her group kidnap Judith and all of the other Alexandria children, kill an innocent resident, and ransack Alexandria's food supply and guns. The next day, Michonne and Daryl search for the children, and eventually spot one of Jocelyn's kids outside of an abandoned school. They chase him until they're met by all of the kids in a hallway where Daryl gets shot in the shoulder with an arrow and Michonne is knocked unconscious. Sometime later, they wake up bloodied and tied to a pipe, and have an iron "X" painfully branded on their backs. When they are left alone, the two manage to get free and escape. Michonne finds an exit and is immediately beaten over and over with a wooden plank by Jocelyn. However, Michonne summons the strength to stab her in her leg and chest, killing her.

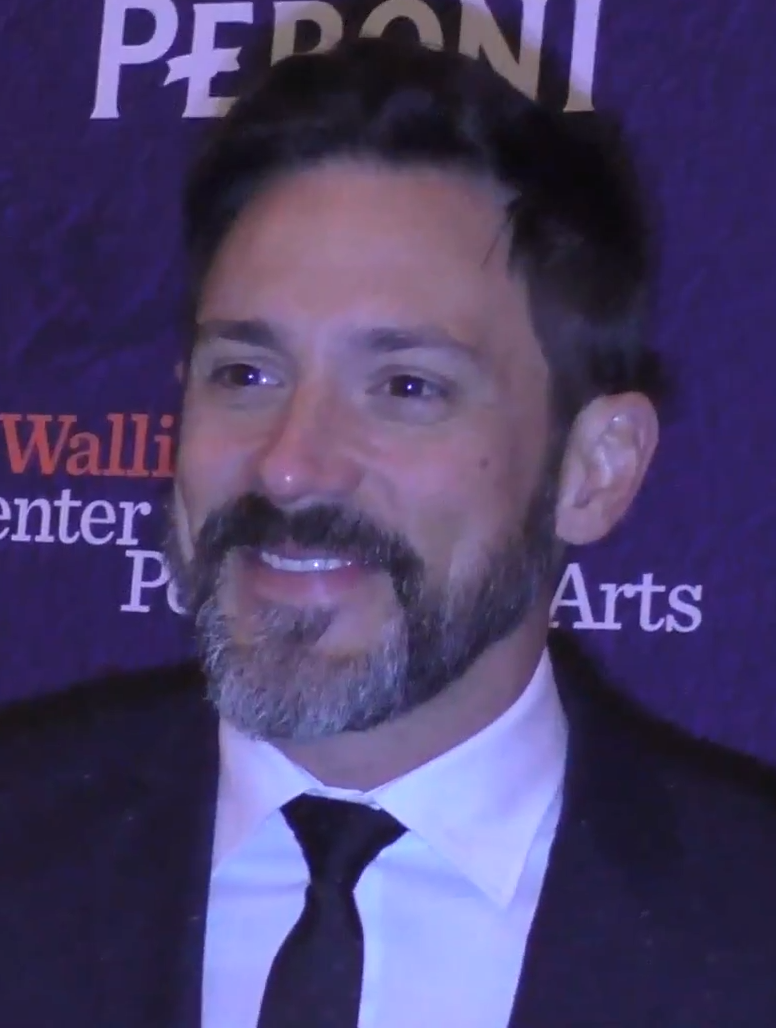
Steve Kazee

- Frank, portrayed by Steve Kazee, is Lydia's father and Alpha's husband who appears in Lydia's flashback ("Omega"). When Frank refuses to leave the shelter with Lydia and Alpha, because he cannot leave his friends behind, Alpha claims him to be weak and stabs him in the neck; she leaves him to bleed to death.

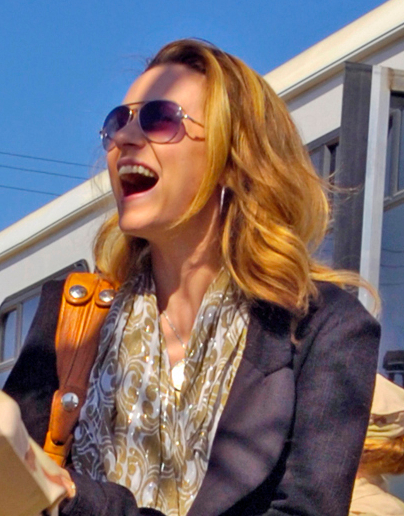
Hilarie Burton

- Lucille, portrayed by Hilarie Burton, is Negan's late wife who died of pancreatic cancer early in the outbreak.

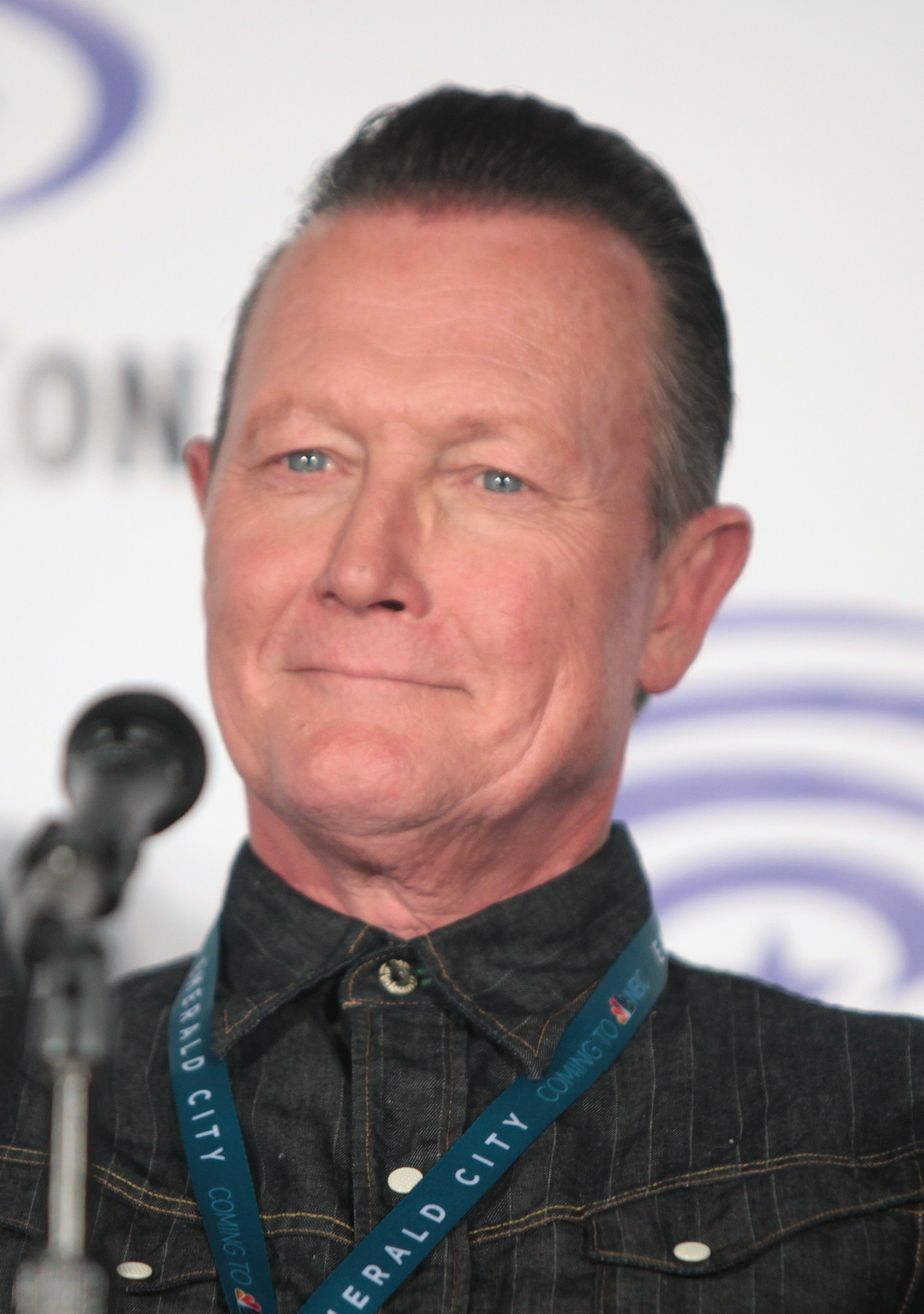
Robert Patrick

- Mays, portrayed by Robert Patrick, is a deranged and renegade survivor. He lost trust in people and lives in an apparently abandoned warehouse. Unaware of his presence, Aaron and Gabriel are subdued by Mays for invading his home. Mays then forces them to play Russian roulette, until Aaron manages to convince him that not all people are bad. Gabriel soon bashes Mays' head with the spiky metal ball attached to Aaron's prosthetic arm, killing him instantly.
- Franklin, portrayed by Miles Mussenden, is an altruistic doctor and Laura's adoptive father who provides medication for Lucille.
- Craven, portrayed by Rodney Rowland, is the antagonistic leader of the motorcycle gang Valak's Vipers. He served as the primary antagonist of the episode "Here's Negan".

== Notes ==
The Walking Dead comic book and television series, based on it, are regarded as separate continuities. Therefore, regardless of any possible similarities between the two media (characters, events, etc.) appearing in one have no effect on the continuity of the other.
